= All-time Paralympic Games medal table =

Below is an all-time medal table for all Paralympic Games from 1960 to 2026. The International Paralympic Committee does not publish all-time tables, and publishes unofficial tables only per single Games. This table was thus compiled by collating single entries from the IPC database. This medal table also includes medals won at the 1992 Summer Paralympics for Intellectually Disabled, held in Madrid, which also organized by the International Coordination Committee (ICC) and same Organizing Committee (COOB'92) that directed the 1992 Summer Paralympics held in Barcelona, however the results are not included in the International Paralympic Committee's (IPC) database.

The results are attributed to the IPC country code as currently displayed by the IPC database. Usually, a single code corresponds to a single National Paralympic Committee (NPC). When different codes are displayed for different years, medal counts are combined in the case of a simple change of IPC code (such as from RHO to ZIM for Zimbabwe) or simple change of country name (such as from Ceylon to Sri Lanka). As the medals are attributed to each NPC, not all totals include medals won by athletes from that country for another NPC, such as before independence of that country (see individual footnotes for special cases such as combined teams). Countries in italic are national entities that no longer exist.

== Medal table ==
The table is pre-sorted by the name of each Paralympic Committee, but can be displayed as sorted by any other column, such as the total number of gold medals or total number of overall medals. To sort by gold, silver, and then bronze (as used unofficially by the IPC and by most broadcasters outside the US) sort first by the bronze column, then the silver, and then the gold. Medal totals in this table are current as of the 2026 Winter Paralympics in Milano Cortina

World map showing nations that have won Summer Paralympic medals, as of completion of the 2024 Summer Paralympics Legend: represents countries that won at least one gold medal. represents countries that won at least one silver medal but no gold medals. represents countries that won at least one bronze medal (no gold or silver). represents participating countries that did not win medals. countries that never participated at the Summer Paralympics

World map showing nations that have won Winter Paralympic medals, as of completion of the 2026 Winter Paralympics Legend: represents countries that won at least one gold medal. represents countries that won at least one silver medal but no gold medals. represents countries that won at least one bronze medal (no gold or silver). represents participating countries that did not win medals. countries that never participated at the Winter Paralympics

	Summer Paralympic Games					Winter Paralympic Games					Combined Total				
Team (IOC code)	№	1st place, gold medalist(s)	2nd place, silver medalist(s)	3rd place, bronze medalist(s)	Total	№	1st place, gold medalist(s)	2nd place, silver medalist(s)	3rd place, bronze medalist(s)	Total	№	1st place, gold medalist(s)	2nd place, silver medalist(s)	3rd place, bronze medalist(s)	Total
Algeria (ALG)	9	33	22	41	96	0	0	0	0	0	9	33	22	41	96
Angola (ANG)	8	4	3	1	8	0	0	0	0	0	8	4	3	1	8
Argentina (ARG)	17	33	69	76	178	5	0	0	0	0	22	33	69	76	178
Australia (AUS)	17	407	439	422	1268	12	12	7	19	38	29	419	447	440	1306
Austria (AUT)	17	113	131	132	376	14	116	122	120	358	31	229	253	252	754
Azerbaijan (AZE)	8	27	21	20	68	1	0	0	0	0	9	27	21	20	68
Bahamas (BAH)	5	0	2	3	5	0	0	0	0	0	5	0	2	3	5
Bahrain (BRN)	11	2	3	5	10	0	0	0	0	0	11	2	3	5	10
Belarus (BLR)	6	41	33	31	105	8	9	12	16	37	15	50	45	47	140
Belgium (BEL)	17	95	97	93	285	10	0	0	2	2	27	95	97	95	287
Bosnia and Herzegovina (BIH)	8	2	5	1	8	5	0	0	0	0	13	2	5	1	8
Botswana (BOT)	5	1	0	0	1	0	0	0	0	0	5	1	0	0	1
Brazil (BRA)	14	135	160	171	466	4	0	1	0	1	18	135	161	171	467
Bulgaria (BUL)	10	6	9	3	18	7	0	0	0	0	17	6	9	3	18
Cape Verde (CPV)	6	0	0	1	1	0	0	0	0	0	6	0	0	1	1
Canada (CAN)	15	410	347	356	1113	14	63	54	86	210	29	473	401	442	1323
Chile (CHI)	9	4	3	6	13	7	0	0	0	0	16	4	3	6	13
China (CHN) (Note: Does not include totals of Chinese Taipei (TPE) or Hong Kong (HKG).)	11	629	476	352	1457	7	34	33	39	106	18	663	509	391	1522
Chinese Taipei (TPE)	9	5	9	16	30	0	0	0	0	0	9	5	9	16	30
Colombia (COL)	12	13	22	40	75	0	0	0	0	0	12	13	22	40	75
Costa Rica (CRC)	8	3	1	0	4	0	0	0	0	0	8	3	1	0	4
Ivory Coast (CIV)	8	3	1	1	5	0	0	0	0	0	8	3	1	1	5
Croatia (CRO)	9	6	9	15	30	7	1	0	1	2	16	7	9	16	32
Cuba (CUB)	9	49	23	30	102	0	0	0	0	0	9	49	23	30	102
Cyprus (CYP)	10	3	4	3	10	0	0	0	0	0	10	3	4	3	10
Czech Republic (CZE) (Note: Totals not combined with those of Czechoslovakia (TCH) Competed 1960–1992.)	8	44	48	53	145	9	6	9	6	21	17	50	57	59	167
Czechoslovakia (TCH) (Note: Competed 1960–1992. Does not include medals won by the Czech Republic (CZE) or Slovakia (SVK) (1994–current).)	4	4	5	8	17	5	3	5	2	10	9	7	10	10	27
Denmark (DEN)	15	104	94	116	314	13	2	1	3	6	28	106	95	119	320
Dominican Republic (DOM)	7	3	6	1	10	0	0	0	0	0	7	3	6	1	10
Ecuador (ECU)	11	3	0	4	7	0	0	0	0	0	11	3	0	4	7
Egypt (EGY)	14	51	71	68	190	0	0	0	0	0	14	51	71	68	190
El Salvador (ESA)	7	0	0	1	1	1	0	0	0	0	7	0	0	1	1
Estonia (EST)	9	4	8	7	19	6	0	0	1	1	14	4	8	8	20
Ethiopia (ETH)	9	3	3	0	6	0	0	0	0	0	9	3	3	0	6
Faroe Islands (FRO)	9	1	7	5	13	0	0	0	0	0	9	1	7	5	13
Fiji (FIJ)	10	1	0	0	1	0	0	0	0	0	10	1	0	0	1
Finland (FIN)	16	76	100	107	283	14	79	52	62	194	30	155	153	169	477
France (FRA)	17	376	390	401	1167	13	72	66	65	203	30	448	456	466	1370
West Germany (FRG) (Note: Recognized as separate NPC from 1960–1988. Totals not combined with those of Germany (GER).)	8	322	260	246	828	4	32	43	38	113	12	354	303	284	941
Georgia (GEO)	5	2	7	4	13	3	0	0	0	0	7	2	7	4	13
Germany (GER) (Note: This does not include West Germany (FRG) or East Germany (GDR).)	9	209	280	278	767	10	100	97	93	302	19	309	377	380	1069
East Germany (GDR) (Note: Recognized as separate NPC from 1968–1988, first entry in 1984. Totals not combined with those of Germany (GER).)	1	0	3	1	4	0	0	0	0	0	1	0	3	1	4
Great Britain (GBR)	17	718	669	661	2048	14	3	15	24	41	31	721	684	685	2090
Greece (GRE)	13	23	43	51	117	7	0	0	0	0	20	23	43	51	117
Guatemala (GUA)	9	1	0	1	2	0	0	0	0	0	9	1	0	1	2
Hong Kong (HKG) (Note: Includes all medals won by athletes representing the Hong Kong National Olympic Committee, designated as Hong Kong from 1960–1996 and Hong Kong, China since 2000.)	14	43	43	53	139	0	0	0	0	0	14	43	43	53	139
Hungary (HUN)	13	43	61	69	173	5	0	0	0	0	18	43	61	69	173
Iceland (ISL)	12	24	16	41	81	6	0	0	0	0	18	24	16	41	81
Independent Paralympic Participants (IPP) (Note: Individual Yugoslav athletes taking part in the 1992 Summer Paralympics because Yugoslavia was under UN sanctions. Totals not combined with those of Yugoslavia (YUG).)	1	4	3	1	8	0	0	0	0	0	1	4	3	1	8
India (IND)	12	16	21	23	60	0	0	0	0	0	12	16	21	23	60
Indonesia (INA)	12	7	15	19	41	0	0	0	0	0	12	7	15	19	41
Iran (IRI)	10	75	58	52	185	7	0	0	0	0	17	75	58	52	185
Iraq (IRQ)	9	4	8	9	21	0	0	0	0	0	9	4	8	9	21
Ireland (IRL)	17	71	71	97	239	0	0	0	0	0	17	71	71	97	239
Israel (ISR)	17	133	127	134	394	2	0	0	0	0	18	133	127	134	394
Italy (ITA)	17	191	217	262	670	14	23	32	34	89	31	211	244	295	760
Jamaica (JAM)	14	21	16	18	54	0	0	0	0	0	14	21	16	18	55
Japan (JPN)	16	141	150	177	468	14	27	37	38	101	29	168	187	215	570
Jordan (JOR)	10	7	7	8	22	0	0	0	0	0	10	7	7	8	22
Kazakhstan (KAZ)	8	4	7	5	16	8	2	1	2	5	16	6	8	7	21
Kenya (KEN)	13	19	17	14	50	0	0	0	0	0	13	19	17	14	50
Kuwait (KUW)	12	13	18	23	54	0	0	0	0	0	12	13	18	23	54
Laos (LAO)	6	0	0	1	1	0	0	0	0	0	6	0	0	1	1
Latvia (LAT)	9	8	8	8	24	4	0	0	1	1	12	8	8	9	25
Lebanon (LBN)	5	0	0	2	2	0	0	0	0	0	5	0	0	2	2
Libya (LBA)	8	0	0	1	1	0	0	0	0	0	8	0	0	1	1
Liechtenstein (LIE)	4	0	0	0	0	3	0	0	1	1	7	0	0	1	1
Lithuania (LTU)	9	6	12	19	37	2	0	0	0	0	11	6	12	19	37
Luxembourg (LUX)	8	1	4	3	8	0	0	0	0	0	8	1	4	3	8
Malaysia (MAS)	11	8	6	7	21	0	0	0	0	0	11	8	6	7	21
Malta (MLT)	11	0	2	5	7	0	0	0	0	0	11	0	2	6	8
Mauritius (MRI)	7	0	0	1	1	0	0	0	0	0	7	0	0	1	1
Mexico (MEX)	14	107	98	123	328	6	0	0	0	0	20	107	98	123	328
Moldova (MDA)	8	0	1	3	4	0	0	0	0	0	8	0	1	3	4
Mongolia (MGL)	7	3	3	2	8	5	0	0	0	0	11	3	3	2	8
Montenegro (MNE)	5	0	0	2	2	1	0	0	0	0	5	0	0	2	2
Morocco (MAR)	10	19	17	17	53	0	0	0	0	0	10	19	17	17	53
Mozambique (MOZ)	4	0	0	1	1	0	0	0	0	0	4	0	0	1	1
Myanmar (MYA)	7	2	3	2	7	0	0	0	0	0	7	2	3	2	7
Namibia (NAM)	7	3	4	5	12	0	0	0	0	0	7	3	4	5	12
Nepal (NEP)	6	0	0	1	1	0	0	0	0	0	6	0	0	1	1
Netherlands (NED)	17	328	279	257	864	11	9	14	7	30	28	337	293	264	894
Neutral Paralympic Athletes (NPA) (Note: Competed in 2018 and 2024. Totals not combined with those of the Russia (RUS) nor Belarus (BLR).)	1	26	22	23	71	1	8	10	6	24	2	34	32	29	95
New Zealand (NZL)	15	81	64	65	210	14	17	8	11	36	27	98	73	76	246
Nigeria (NGR)	9	42	22	23	80	0	0	0	0	0	9	42	22	23	87
North Macedonia (MKD)	8	1	1	0	2	1	0	0	0	0	8	1	1	0	2
Norway (NOR)	16	117	108	99	324	14	142	112	88	338	30	259	220	187	662
Oman (OMA)	10	0	0	1	1	0	0	0	0	0	10	0	0	1	1
Pakistan (PAK)	9	1	1	2	4	0	0	0	0	0	9	1	1	2	4
Palestine (PLE)	7	0	1	2	3	0	0	0	0	0	7	0	1	2	3
Panama (PAN)	9	3	4	1	8	0	0	0	0	0	9	3	4	1	8
Papua New Guinea (PNG)	7	0	1	0	1	0	0	0	0	0	7	0	1	0	1
Peru (PER)	9	5	1	4	10	0	0	0	0	0	9	5	1	4	10
Philippines (PHI)	9	0	0	2	2	0	0	0	0	0	9	0	0	2	2
Poland (POL)	14	277	271	228	776	13	11	7	29	45	26	288	278	259	823
Portugal (POR)	12	27	31	43	101	1	0	0	0	0	12	27	31	43	101
Puerto Rico (PUR)	10	1	2	4	7	2	0	0	0	0	11	1	2	4	7
Qatar (QAT)	8	0	2	1	3	0	0	0	0	0	8	0	2	1	3
Refugee Paralympic Team (RPT)	2	0	0	2	2	0	0	0	0	0	2	0	0	2	2
Rhodesia (RHO) (Note: Competed 1960–1972. Totals not combined with those of the Zimbabwe (ZIM).)	4	21	18	15	54	0	0	0	0	0	4	21	18	15	54
Romania (ROU)	9	12	9	10	31	5	0	0	0	0	13	12	9	10	31
Russia (RUS) (Note: Competed 1994–2014. Totals not combined with those of the Soviet Union (URS).)	5	91	87	90	268	7	92	89	67	233	12	183	176	157	501
RPC (RPC)	1	36	33	49	116	0	0	0	0	0	1	36	33	49	116
Rwanda (RWA)	7	0	0	1	1	0	0	0	0	0	7	0	0	1	1
Saudi Arabia (KSA)	8	2	2	2	6	0	0	0	0	0	8	2	2	2	6
Serbia (SRB)	5	8	13	7	28	5	0	0	0	0	10	8	13	7	28
Serbia and Montenegro (SCG) (Note: Does not include medals won by athletes from the Federal Republic of Yugoslavia (YUG, 1996–2000).)	1	0	0	2	2	0	0	0	0	0	1	0	0	2	2
Singapore (SGP)	10	7	3	4	14	0	0	0	0	0	10	7	3	4	14
Slovakia (SVK)	8	27	23	25	75	9	18	21	26	66	16	45	44	52	141
Slovenia (SLO)	9	5	10	11	26	7	0	0	0	0	16	5	10	11	26
South Africa (RSA)	13	123	95	92	310	6	0	0	0	0	19	123	95	92	310
South Korea (KOR)	15	134	126	135	395	10	3	6	3	12	25	137	132	138	407
Soviet Union (URS) (Note: Competed 1960–1988. Does not include the totals from the Unified Team (EUN, 1992), nor the totals from pre- and post-Soviet republics (RUS, UKR, etc.).)	1	21	19	15	55	1	0	0	2	2	2	21	19	17	57
Spain (ESP)	15	224	247	256	727	12	17	17	13	47	27	241	264	269	774
Sri Lanka (SRI)	8	1	1	3	4	0	0	0	0	0	8	1	1	3	5
Sudan (SUD)	3	1	0	0	1	0	0	0	0	0	3	1	0	0	1
Sweden (SWE)	17	235	234	180	649	14	31	35	49	115	31	265	269	229	764
Switzerland (SUI)	17	101	109	107	317	14	55	58	52	165	31	160	165	159	480
Syria (SYR)	9	0	0	1	1	0	0	0	0	0	9	0	0	1	1
Thailand (THA)	11	30	40	47	117	0	0	0	0	0	11	30	40	47	117
Trinidad and Tobago (TTO)	5	3	2	2	7	0	0	0	0	0	5	3	2	2	7
Tunisia (TUN)	10	48	41	25	114	0	0	0	0	0	10	48	41	25	114
Turkey (TUR)	8	14	20	32	66	3	0	0	0	0	10	14	20	32	66
Uganda (UGA)	10	0	1	1	2	2	0	0	0	0	12	0	1	1	2
Ukraine (UKR)	8	171	190	193	554	8	41	63	62	166	16	212	253	255	720
Unified Team (EUN) (Note: Team of several Commonwealth of Independent States nations that competed together in 1992 after the breakup of the Soviet Union. Totals not combined with those of the Soviet Union (URS).)	1	20	15	16	51	1	10	8	3	21	2	30	23	19	72
United Arab Emirates (UAE)	9	5	11	6	22	0	0	0	0	0	9	5	11	6	22
United States (USA)	17	844	778	766	2388	14	133	135	93	361	31	977	913	859	2749
Uruguay (URU)	9	5	4	6	15	0	0	0	0	0	9	5	4	6	15
Uzbekistan (UZB)	6	26	21	30	77	3	0	0	0	0	9	26	21	30	77
Venezuela (VEN)	10	7	9	14	30	0	0	0	0	0	10	7	9	14	30
Vietnam (VIE)	7	1	2	3	6	0	0	0	0	0	7	1	2	3	6
Yugoslavia (YUG) (Note: Includes medals won by athletes from the Socialist Federal Republic of Yugoslavia (1960–1992 Winter) and the Federal Republic of Yugoslavia (1996–2000), all of which used the name "Yugoslavia" and the country code YUG. Does not include medals won by Serbia and Montenegro (SCG, 2002–2006) or of any other ex-SFRY nation that have won medals since 1992 (CRO, SLO, BIH, MKD). Also does not include medals won by Yugoslav athletes competing as Independent Olympic Participants at the 1992 Summer Olympics (IOP).)	6	18	22	30	70	4	0	0	1	1	10	18	22	31	71
Zimbabwe (ZIM)	10	2	9	6	17	0	0	0	0	0	10	2	9	6	17
Totals	17	8083	7882	7972	23937	14	1173	1157	1143	3473	31	9246	9039	9115	27400

== Countries without medals ==
After the 2024 Summer Paralympics in Paris, 66 of the current 183 National Paralympic Committees have yet to win a Paralympic medal. Two historic National Paralympic Committees are also included in this list.

Team (IPC code)	№ Summer	№ Winter	№ Games
Afghanistan (AFG)	7	0	7
Albania (ALB)	1	0	1
Andorra (AND)	1	6	6
Antigua and Barbuda (ANT)	1	0	1
Armenia (ARM)	8	6	14
Aruba (ARU)	3	0	3
Bangladesh (BAN)	3	0	3
Barbados (BAR)	6	0	6
Benin (BEN)	7	0	7
Bermuda (BER)	8	0	8
Bhutan (BHU)	2	0	2
Brunei (BRU)	1	0	1
Burkina Faso (BUR)	8	0	8
Burundi (BDI)	5	0	5
Cambodia (CAM)	7	0	7
Cameroon (CMR)	4	0	4
Central African Republic (CAF)	6	0	6
Comoros (COM)	2	0	2
Democratic Republic of the Congo (COD)	4	0	4
Djibouti (DJI)	1	0	1
Eritrea (ERI)	1	0	1
Gabon (GAB)	5	0	5
The Gambia (GAM)	4	0	4
Ghana (GHA)	6	0	6
Grenada (GRN)	2	0	2
Guinea (GUI)	5	0	5
Guinea-Bissau (GBS)	4	0	4
Guyana (GUY)	1	0	1
Haiti (HAI)	5	0	5
Honduras (HON)	8	0	8
Kiribati (KIR)	1	0	1
Kosovo (KOS)	1	0	1
Kyrgyzstan (KGZ)	8	0	8
Lesotho (LES)	7	0	7
Liberia (LBR)	3	0	3
Macau (MAC)	9	0	9
Madagascar (MAD)	4	0	4
Malawi (MAW)	4	0	4
Maldives (MDV)	2	0	2
Mali (MLI)	6	0	6
Mauritania (MTN)	3	0	3
Nicaragua (NCA)	5	0	5
Niger (NIG)	6	0	6
North Korea (PRK)	2	1	3
Paraguay (PAR)	2	0	2
Republic of the Congo (CGO)	3	0	3
Saint Vincent and the Grenadines (VIN)	2	0	2
Samoa (SAM)	5	0	5
San Marino (SMR)	1	0	1
São Tomé and Príncipe (STP)	3	0	3
Senegal (SEN)	6	0	6
Seychelles (SEY)	2	0	2
Sierra Leone (SLE)	5	0	5
Solomon Islands (SOL)	3	0	3
Somalia (SOM)	3	0	3
Suriname (SUR)	5	0	5
Tajikistan (TJK)	4	1	5
Tanzania (TAN)	7	0	7
Timor-Leste (TLS)	4	0	4
Togo (TOG)	3	0	3
Tonga (TGA)	6	0	6
Turkmenistan (TKM)	5	0	5
Vanuatu (VAN)	4	0	4
Virgin Islands (ISV)	4	0	4
Yemen (YEM)	3	0	3
Zambia (ZAM)	6	0	6
Individual Paralympic Athletes (IPA)	1	0	1
Independent Paralympic Athletes (API)	1	0	1
Totals	16	12	28

== Complete ranked medals ==
This medal table also includes the medals won at the 1992 Summer Paralympics for Intellectually Disabled, held in Madrid, who also organized by then International Coordenation Committee (ICC) and same Organizing Committee (COOB'92) who made the gestion of the 1992 Summer Paralympics held in Barcelona and also part of same event. But the results are not on the International Paralympic Committee 's (IPC) database.

=== Summer Paralympics (1960–2024) ===
Rank	NOC	Gold	Silver	Bronze	Total
1	United States (USA)	844	778	766	2,388
2	Great Britain (GBR)	718	669	661	2,048
3	China (CHN)	629	476	352	1,457
4	Canada (CAN)	410	349	359	1,118
5	Australia (AUS)	407	439	422	1,268
6	France (FRA)	376	390	401	1,167
7	Netherlands (NED)	328	279	258	865
8	West Germany (FRG)*	322	260	246	828
9	Poland (POL)	277	271	228	776
10	Sweden (SWE)	235	234	180	649
11	Spain (ESP)	224	247	256	727
12	Germany (GER)	209	270	278	757
13	Italy (ITA)	191	217	262	670
14	Ukraine (UKR)	171	190	193	554
15	Japan (JPN)	141	150	177	468
16	Brazil (BRA)	135	160	171	466
17	South Korea (KOR)	134	126	135	395
18	Israel (ISR)	133	127	134	394
19	South Africa (RSA)	123	95	92	310
20	Norway (NOR)	117	108	99	324
21	Austria (AUT)	113	131	132	376
22	Mexico (MEX)	107	98	123	328
23	Denmark (DEN)	104	94	116	314
24	Switzerland (SUI)	101	109	107	317
25	Belgium (BEL)	95	97	93	285
26	Russia (RUS)	91	87	90	268
27	New Zealand (NZL)	81	64	65	210
28	Finland (FIN)	76	100	108	284
29	Iran (IRI)	75	58	52	185
30	Ireland (IRL)	71	71	97	239
31	Egypt (EGY)	51	71	68	190
32	Cuba (CUB)	49	23	29	101
33	Tunisia (TUN)	48	42	25	115
34	Czech Republic (CZE)	44	48	53	145
35	Hungary (HUN)	43	61	69	173
36	Hong Kong (HKG)	43	43	53	139
37	Nigeria (NGR)	42	22	23	87
38	Belarus (BLR)	41	33	31	105
39	RPC (RPC)*	36	33	49	118
40	Argentina (ARG)	33	69	76	178
41	Algeria (ALG)	33	22	41	96
42	Thailand (THA)	30	40	47	117
43	Portugal (POR)	27	34	45	106
44	Slovakia (SVK)	27	23	25	75
45	Azerbaijan (AZE)	27	21	20	68
46	Neutral Paralympic Athletes (NPA)*	26	22	23	71
47	Uzbekistan (UZB)	26	21	30	77
48	Iceland (ISL)	24	16	41	81
49	Greece (GRE)	23	43	51	117
50	Soviet Union (URS)*	21	19	15	55
51	Kenya (KEN)	21	18	16	55
52	Rhodesia (RHO)*	21	18	15	54
53	Jamaica (JAM)	21	16	18	55
54	Unified Team (EUN)*	20	15	16	51
55	Morocco (MAR)	19	17	17	53
56	Yugoslavia (YUG)*	18	22	30	70
57	India (IND)	16	21	23	60
58	Turkey (TUR)	14	20	32	66
59	Colombia (COL)	13	22	40	75
60	Kuwait (KUW)	13	18	23	54
61	Romania (ROU)	12	9	10	31
62	Serbia (SRB)	8	13	7	28
63	Latvia (LAT)	8	8	8	24
64	Malaysia (MAS)	8	6	7	21
65	Indonesia (INA)	7	15	19	41
66	Venezuela (VEN)	7	9	14	30
67	Jordan (JOR)	7	7	8	22
68	Singapore (SGP)	7	3	4	14
69	Lithuania (LTU)	6	12	19	37
70	Croatia (CRO)	6	9	15	30
71	Bulgaria (BUL)	6	9	3	18
72	United Arab Emirates (UAE)	5	11	6	22
73	Slovenia (SLO)	5	10	11	26
74	Chinese Taipei (TPE)	5	9	16	30
75	Uruguay (URU)	5	4	6	15
76	Chile (CHI)	5	3	6	14
77	Peru (PER)	5	1	4	10
78	Iraq (IRQ)	4	8	9	21
79	Estonia (EST)	4	8	7	19
80	Kazakhstan (KAZ)	4	7	5	16
81	Czechoslovakia (TCH)*	4	5	8	17
82	Angola (ANG)	4	3	1	8
82	Independent Paralympic Participants (IPP)*	4	3	1	8
84	Dominican Republic (DOM)	3	6	1	10
85	Namibia (NAM)	3	4	5	12
86	Cyprus (CYP)	3	4	3	10
87	Panama (PAN)	3	4	1	8
88	Mongolia (MGL)	3	3	2	8
89	Ethiopia (ETH)	3	3	0	6
90	Trinidad and Tobago (TTO)	3	2	2	7
91	Ivory Coast (CIV)	3	1	1	5
92	Costa Rica (CRC)	3	1	0	4
93	Ecuador (ECU)	3	0	4	7
94	Zimbabwe (ZIM)	2	9	6	17
95	Georgia (GEO)	2	7	4	13
96	Bosnia and Herzegovina (BIH)	2	5	1	8
97	Bahrain (BRN)	2	3	5	10
98	Myanmar (MYA)	2	3	2	7
99	Saudi Arabia (KSA)	2	2	2	6
100	Faroe Islands (FRO)	1	7	5	13
101	Luxembourg (LUX)	1	4	3	8
102	Puerto Rico (PUR)	1	2	4	7
103	Vietnam (VIE)	1	2	3	6
104	Sri Lanka (SRI)	1	1	3	5
105	Pakistan (PAK)	1	1	2	4
106	North Macedonia (MKD)	1	1	0	2
107	Guatemala (GUA)	1	0	1	2
108	Botswana (BOT)	1	0	0	1
108	Fiji (FIJ)	1	0	0	1
108	Sudan (SUD)	1	0	0	1
111	East Germany (GDR)*	0	3	1	4
112	Malta (MLT)	0	2	5	7
113	Bahamas (BAH)	0	2	3	5
114	Qatar (QAT)	0	2	1	3
115	Moldova (MDA)	0	1	3	4
116	Palestine (PLE)	0	1	2	3
117	Uganda (UGA)	0	1	1	2
118	Papua New Guinea (PNG)	0	1	0	1
119	Lebanon (LBN)	0	0	2	2
119	Montenegro (MNE)	0	0	2	2
119	Philippines (PHI)	0	0	2	2
119	Refugee Paralympic Team (RPT)	0	0	2	2
119	Serbia and Montenegro (SCG)*	0	0	2	2
124	Cape Verde (CPV)	0	0	1	1
124	El Salvador (ESA)	0	0	1	1
124	Laos (LAO)	0	0	1	1
124	Libya (LBA)	0	0	1	1
124	Mauritius (MRI)	0	0	1	1
124	Mozambique (MOZ)	0	0	1	1
124	Nepal (NEP)	0	0	1	1
124	Oman (OMA)	0	0	1	1
124	Rwanda (RWA)	0	0	1	1
124	Syria (SYR)	0	0	1	1
Totals (133 entries)		8,097	7,897	7,987	23,981

=== Winter Paralympics (1976–2026) ===
Rank	NPC	Gold	Silver	Bronze	Total
1	Norway (NOR)	142	112	88	342
2	United States (USA)	130	135	94	359
3	Austria (AUT)	116	122	120	358
4	Germany (GER)	111	93	87	291
5	Russia (RUS)	91	88	63	242
6	Finland (FIN)	80	52	61	193
7	France (FRA)	70	62	63	195
8	Canada (CAN)	62	57	84	203
9	Switzerland (SUI)	55	57	52	164
10	Ukraine (UKR)	42	59	61	162
11	China (CHN)	34	33	39	106
12	West Germany (FRG)*	32	43	35	110
13	Sweden (SWE)	31	35	48	114
14	Japan (JPN)	27	36	38	101
15	Italy (ITA)	23	32	34	89
16	Slovakia (SVK)	18	21	25	64
17	Spain (ESP)	17	17	13	47
18	New Zealand (NZL)	17	8	11	36
19	Australia (AUS)	12	7	18	37
20	Poland (POL)	11	7	29	47
21	Unified Team (EUN)*	10	8	3	21
22	Belarus (BLR)	9	14	14	37
23	Netherlands (NED)	9	13	7	29
24	Neutral Paralympic Athletes (NPA)*	8	10	6	24
25	Czech Republic (CZE)	6	9	6	21
26	Great Britain (GBR)	3	15	23	41
27	South Korea (KOR)	3	6	3	12
28	Czechoslovakia (TCH)*	3	5	2	10
29	Denmark (DEN)	2	1	3	6
30	Kazakhstan (KAZ)	2	1	2	5
31	Croatia (CRO)	1	0	1	2
32	Brazil (BRA)	0	1	0	1
33	Belgium (BEL)	0	0	2	2
33	Soviet Union (URS)*	0	0	2	2
35	Estonia (EST)	0	0	1	1
35	Latvia (LAT)	0	0	1	1
35	Liechtenstein (LIE)	0	0	1	1
35	Yugoslavia (YUG)*	0	0	1	1
Totals (38 entries)		1,177	1,159	1,141	3,477

=== Combined total (1960–2026) ===
Rank	NOC	Gold	Silver	Bronze	Total
1	United States (USA)	974	913	858	2,745
2	Great Britain (GBR)	721	684	684	2,089
3	China (CHN)	663	509	391	1,563
4	Canada (CAN)	472	403	440	1,315
5	France (FRA)	450	456	469	1,375
6	Australia (AUS)	419	446	440	1,305
7	West Germany (FRG)*	354	303	281	938
8	Netherlands (NED)	337	292	265	894
9	Germany (GER)	320	373	365	1,058
10	Poland (POL)	288	278	257	823
11	Sweden (SWE)	266	269	228	763
12	Norway (NOR)	259	220	187	666
13	Spain (ESP)	241	264	261	766
14	Austria (AUT)	229	253	252	734
15	Italy (ITA)	214	249	296	759
16	Ukraine (UKR)	212	249	253	714
17	Russia (RUS)	183	176	154	513
18	Japan (JPN)	168	186	215	569
19	Switzerland (SUI)	156	166	159	481
20	Finland (FIN)	155	153	169	477
21	South Korea (KOR)	137	132	138	407
22	Brazil (BRA)	135	161	171	467
23	Israel (ISR)	133	127	134	394
24	South Africa (RSA)	123	95	92	310
25	Mexico (MEX)	107	98	123	328
26	Denmark (DEN)	106	95	119	320
27	New Zealand (NZL)	98	72	76	246
28	Belgium (BEL)	95	97	95	287
29	Iran (IRI)	75	58	52	185
30	Ireland (IRL)	71	71	97	239
31	Egypt (EGY)	51	71	68	190
32	Czech Republic (CZE)	50	57	59	166
33	Belarus (BLR)	50	45	47	142
34	Cuba (CUB)	49	23	30	102
35	Tunisia (TUN)	48	41	25	114
36	Slovakia (SVK)	45	44	50	139
37	Hungary (HUN)	43	61	69	173
38	Hong Kong (HKG)	43	43	53	139
39	Nigeria (NGR)	42	22	23	87
40	RPC (RPC)*	36	33	49	118
41	Neutral Paralympic Athletes (NPA)*	34	32	29	95
42	Argentina (ARG)	33	69	76	178
43	Algeria (ALG)	33	22	41	96
44	Thailand (THA)	30	40	47	117
45	Unified Team (EUN)*	30	23	19	72
46	Portugal (POR)	27	31	43	101
47	Azerbaijan (AZE)	27	21	20	68
48	Uzbekistan (UZB)	26	21	30	77
49	Iceland (ISL)	24	16	41	81
50	Greece (GRE)	23	43	51	117
51	Soviet Union (URS)*	21	19	17	57
52	Kenya (KEN)	21	18	16	55
53	Rhodesia (RHO)*	21	18	15	54
54	Jamaica (JAM)	21	16	18	55
55	Morocco (MAR)	19	17	17	53
56	Yugoslavia (YUG)*	18	22	31	71
57	India (IND)	16	21	23	60
58	Turkey (TUR)	14	20	32	66
59	Colombia (COL)	13	22	40	75
60	Kuwait (KUW)	13	18	23	54
61	Romania (ROU)	12	9	10	31
62	Serbia (SRB)	8	13	7	28
63	Latvia (LAT)	8	8	10	26
64	Malaysia (MAS)	8	6	7	21
65	Indonesia (INA)	7	15	19	41
66	Czechoslovakia (TCH)*	7	10	10	27
67	Croatia (CRO)	7	9	16	32
68	Venezuela (VEN)	7	9	14	30
69	Jordan (JOR)	7	7	8	22
70	Singapore (SGP)	7	3	4	14
71	Lithuania (LTU)	6	12	19	37
72	Bulgaria (BUL)	6	9	3	18
73	Kazakhstan (KAZ)	6	8	7	21
74	United Arab Emirates (UAE)	5	11	6	22
75	Slovenia (SLO)	5	10	11	26
76	Chinese Taipei (TPE)	5	9	16	30
77	Uruguay (URU)	5	4	6	15
78	Peru (PER)	5	1	4	10
79	Iraq (IRQ)	4	8	9	21
80	Estonia (EST)	4	8	8	20
81	Chile (CHI)	4	3	6	13
82	Angola (ANG)	4	3	1	8
82	Independent Paralympic Participants (IPP)*	4	3	1	8
84	Dominican Republic (DOM)	3	6	1	10
85	Namibia (NAM)	3	4	5	12
86	Cyprus (CYP)	3	4	3	10
87	Panama (PAN)	3	4	1	8
88	Mongolia (MGL)	3	3	2	8
89	Ethiopia (ETH)	3	3	0	6
90	Trinidad and Tobago (TTO)	3	2	2	7
91	Ivory Coast (CIV)	3	1	1	5
92	Costa Rica (CRC)	3	1	0	4
93	Ecuador (ECU)	3	0	5	8
94	Zimbabwe (ZIM)	2	9	6	17
95	Georgia (GEO)	2	7	4	13
96	Bosnia and Herzegovina (BIH)	2	5	1	8
97	Bahrain (BRN)	2	3	5	10
98	Myanmar (MYA)	2	3	2	7
99	Saudi Arabia (KSA)	2	2	2	6
100	Faroe Islands (FRO)	1	7	5	13
101	Luxembourg (LUX)	1	4	3	8
102	Puerto Rico (PUR)	1	2	3	6
102	Vietnam (VIE)	1	2	3	6
104	Sri Lanka (SRI)	1	1	3	5
105	Pakistan (PAK)	1	1	2	4
106	North Macedonia (MKD)	1	1	0	2
107	Guatemala (GUA)	1	0	1	2
108	Botswana (BOT)	1	0	0	1
108	Fiji (FIJ)	1	0	0	1
108	Sudan (SUD)	1	0	0	1
111	East Germany (GDR)*	0	3	1	4
112	Malta (MLT)	0	2	5	7
113	Bahamas (BAH)	0	2	3	5
114	Qatar (QAT)	0	2	1	3
115	Moldova (MDA)	0	1	3	4
116	Palestine (PLE)	0	1	2	3
117	Uganda (UGA)	0	1	1	2
118	Papua New Guinea (PNG)	0	1	0	1
119	Lebanon (LBN)	0	0	2	2
119	Montenegro (MNE)	0	0	2	2
119	Philippines (PHI)	0	0	2	2
119	Refugee Paralympic Team (RPT)	0	0	2	2
119	Serbia and Montenegro (SCG)*	0	0	2	2
124	Cape Verde (CPV)	0	0	1	1
124	El Salvador (ESA)	0	0	1	1
124	Laos (LAO)	0	0	1	1
124	Libya (LBA)	0	0	1	1
124	Liechtenstein (LIE)	0	0	1	1
124	Mauritius (MRI)	0	0	1	1
124	Mozambique (MOZ)	0	0	1	1
124	Nepal (NEP)	0	0	1	1
124	Oman (OMA)	0	0	1	1
124	Rwanda (RWA)	0	0	1	1
124	Syria (SYR)	0	0	1	1
Totals (134 entries)		9,276	9,063	9,122	27,461

== See also ==
- All-time Olympic Games medal table
- All-time Youth Olympic Games medal table
- Lists of Paralympic medalists
- List of multiple Paralympic gold medalists
- List of Paralympic teams by medals won
