= Athletics at the 2024 Summer Paralympics – Men's 100 metres T47 =

Men's 100 metres T47 at the XVII Paralympic Games
- Venue: Stade de France
- Dates: 30 August 2024
- Competitors: 18 from 14 nations
- Winning time: 10.68

Medalists
1st place, gold medalist(s)		Petrúcio Ferreira	Brazil
2nd place, silver medalist(s)		Korban Best	United States
3rd place, bronze medalist(s)		Aymane El Haddaoui	Morocco

100 metres at the 2024 Summer Paralympics
Men · T11 · T12 · T13 · T34 · T35 · T36 · T37 · T38 · T44 · T47 · T51 · T52 · T53 · T54 · T63 · T64
Women · T11 · T12 · T13 · T34 · T35 · T36 · T37 · T38 · T47 · T53 · T54 · T63 · T64

The men's 100 metres T47 event at the 2024 Summer Paralympics in Paris, took place on 30 August 2024.

The T46 category is for athletes who have a single above or below elbow amputation or similar disability, with normal function in both legs. The T47 category is for athletes who have a single below elbow or wrist amputation or similar disability, with normal function in both legs.

== Records ==
Prior to the competition, the existing records were as follows:

T45
World Record	Yohansson Nascimento (BRA)	10.94	(United Kingdom) London	6 September 2012
Paralympic Record	Yohansson Nascimento (BRA)	10.94	(United Kingdom) London	6 September 2012

Area	Time		Athlete	Location	Date
Africa	11.05		(Nigeria) Vitalis Lanshima	(United States) Atlanta	1 July 2006
America	10.94	WR	(Brazil) Yohansson Nascimento	(United Kingdom) London	6 September 2012
Asia	11.05		(Japan) Yuya Sambongi	(Japan) Totori	25 June 2023
Europe	11.46		(United Kingdom) Kyle Powell	(United Kingdom) Aylesbury	7 August 2014
Oceania	11.97		Record mark		

T46/47
World Record	Petrúcio Ferreira (BRA)	10.29	(Brazil) São Paulo	31 March 2022
Paralympic Record	Petrúcio Ferreira (BRA)	10.53	(Japan) Tokyo	27 August 2021

Area	Time		Athlete	Location	Date
Africa	10.72		(Nigeria) Adeoye Ajibola	(Spain) Barcelona	6 September 1992
America	10.29	WR	(Brazil) Petrúcio Ferreira	(Brazil) São Paulo	31 March 2022
Asia	10.74		(China) Wang Hao	(Japan) Tokyo	27 August 2021
Europe	10.61		(Poland) Michał Derus	(Japan) Tokyo	27 August 2021
Oceania	10.96		(Australia) Gabriel Cole	(France) Lyon	24 July 2013

== Results ==
=== Round 1 ===
First 3 in each heat (Q) and the next 2 fastest (q) advance to the Final. 2 heats start on 30 August 2024.

==== Heat 1 ====
Rank	Lane	Athlete	Nation	Class	Time	Notes
1	9	Aymane El Haddaoui	Morocco	T47	10.69	Q, AR
2	1	Raciel González	Cuba	T46	10.74	Q, PB
3	7	Kudakwashe Chigwedere	Zimbabwe	T47	10.78	Q, PB
4	6	Washington Júnior	Brazil	T47	10.83	q
5	4	Lucas Sousa	Brazil	T46	10.84	q
6	3	Phil Grolla	Germany	T47	10.94	
7	5	Luis Vásquez	Dominican Republic	T47	11.09	PB
8	8	Rayven Sample	Brazil	T45	11.56	
9	2	Jutomu Kollie	Liberia	T46	12.81	PB
					Wind: +0.5 m/s	

==== Heat 2 ====
Rank	Lane	Athlete	Nation	Class	Time	Notes
1	7	Korban Best	United States	T47	10.78	Q, =PB
2	6	Petrúcio Ferreira	Brazil	T47	10.90	Q
3	5	Wang Hao	China	T46	10.90	Q
4	4	Michał Derus	Poland	T47	10.92	
5	1	Fayssal Atchiba	Benin	T46	11.24	PB
6	8	Luis Fernando Lara	Colombia	T46	11.32	=PB
7	9	Yamoussa Sylla	Guinea	T47	12.11	
8	2	Davy Moukagni	Gabon	T46	12.90	SB
–	3	Ayoub Sadni	Morocco	T47	DQ	R17.8
					Wind: -0.4 m/s	

=== Final ===
Final starts on 30 August 2024.

Rank	Lane	Athlete	Nation	Class	Time	Notes
1st place, gold medalist(s)	6	Petrúcio Ferreira	Brazil	T47	10.68	SB
2nd place, silver medalist(s)	4	Korban Best	United States	T47	10.75	PB
3rd place, bronze medalist(s)	5	Aymane El Haddaoui	Morocco	T47	10.78	
4	3	Wang Hao	China	T46	10.81	SB
5	9	Washington Júnior	Brazil	T47	10.86	
6	7	Raciel González	Cuba	T46	10.93	
6	2	Lucas Sousa	Brazil	T46	10.93	
8	8	Kudakwashe Chigwedere	Zimbabwe	T47	10.95	
					Wind: +0.2 m/s	
