= São Tomé and Príncipe at the Paralympics =

- IPC code: STP
- Medals: Gold 0 Silver 0 Bronze 0 Total 0

Summer appearances
- 2016; 2020; 2024

São Tomé and Príncipe first competed at the Paralympic Games in 2016, at the Summer Games in Rio de Janeiro, Brazil. One wheelchair athlete was sent to compete in track and field events. São Tomé and Príncipe has never taken part in the Winter Paralympic Games, and no athlete from the country has ever won a Paralympic medal.

== Full results for São Tomé and Príncipe at the Paralympics ==
Name	Games	Sport	Event	Score	Rank
Alex Anjos	2016 Rio	Athletics at the 2016 Summer Paralympics	Men's 100 m T47	DQ	Disqualified in heat 2; did not advance
Alex Anjos	2016 Rio	Athletics at the 2016 Summer Paralympics	Men's 400 m T47	50.94	3rd in heat 3; did not advance
Alex Anjos	2020 Tokyo	Athletics at the 2020 Summer Paralympics	Men's 400 m T47	54.24	7th in heat 1; did not advance
Alex Anjos	2024 Paris	Athletics at the 2024 Summer Paralympics	Men's 400 m T47	56.17	8th in heat 2; did not advance

== See also ==
- São Tomé and Príncipe at the Olympics
