= Athletics at the 2016 Summer Paralympics – Men's 100 metres T47 =

Men's 100 metres T47 at the XV Paralympic Games
- Venue: Estádio Olímpico João Havelange
- Dates: 10–11 September 2016
- Competitors: 16 from 15 nations

Medalists
1st place, gold medalist(s)		Petrucio Ferreira dos Santos	Brazil
2nd place, silver medalist(s)		Michal Derus	Poland
3rd place, bronze medalist(s)		Yohansson Nascimento	Brazil

The T47 category is for athletes who have a single below elbow or wrist amputation or similar disability, with normal function in both legs.

The Athletics at the 2016 Summer Paralympics – Men's 100 metres T47 event at the 2016 Paralympic Games took place on 10–11 September 2016, at the Estádio Olímpico João Havelange.

== Heats ==
=== Heat 1 ===
11:48 10 September 2016:

Rank	Lane	Bib	Name	Nationality	Reaction	Time	Notes
1	5	1145	Petrucio Ferreira dos Santos	Brazil		10.67	Q
2	4	1352	Raciel Gonzalez Isidoria	Cuba		10.93	Q
3	3	2379	Roderick Townsend-Roberts	United States		11.07	Q
4	9	1048	Gabriel Cole	Australia		11.14	q
5	2	1659	Ahmad Ojaghlou	Iran		11.22	q
6	7	1611	Setiyo Budi Hartanto	Indonesia		11.56	
7	6	2243	Romikhudo Dodikhudoev	Tajikistan		12.89	
	8	1530	Cesar Lopes Cardoso	Guinea-Bissau			DSQ

=== Heat 2 ===
11:55 10 September 2016:

Rank	Lane	Bib	Name	Nationality	Reaction	Time	Notes
1	8	1150	Yohansson Nascimento	Brazil		10.75	Q
2	9	2021	Michal Derus	Poland		10.79	Q
3	6	1259	Hao Wang	China		10.95	Q
4	4	1744	Tomoki Tagawa	Japan		11.30	
5	3	1571	Christos Koutoulias	Greece		11.52	
6	7	1948	Ibrahim Dayabou	Niger		11.90	
7	5	1910	Elias Ndimulunde	Namibia		12.68	
	2	2170	Alex Anjos	São Tomé and Príncipe			DSQ

== Final ==
10:45 11 September 2016:

Rank	Lane	Bib	Name	Nationality	Reaction	Time	Notes
1st place, gold medalist(s)	7	1145	Petrucio Ferreira dos Santos	Brazil		10.57	
2nd place, silver medalist(s)	6	2021	Michal Derus	Poland		10.79	
3rd place, bronze medalist(s)	5	1150	Yohansson Nascimento	Brazil		10.79	
4	9	1259	Hao Wang	China		11.03	
5	8	2379	Roderick Townsend-Roberts	United States		11.08	
6	4	1352	Raciel Gonzalez Isidoria	Cuba		11.16	
7	3	1048	Gabriel Cole	Australia		11.17	
8	2	1659	Ahmad Ojaghlou	Iran		11.27	
