= Somalia at the Paralympics =

- IPC code: SOM
- Medals: Gold 0 Silver 0 Bronze 0 Total 0

Summer appearances
- 2016; 2020; 2024

Somalia competed at the Paralympic Games for the first time in 2016, at the Summer Paralympics in Rio de Janeiro, Brazil. It sent one wheelchair athlete to compete in track and field events. Somalia has never taken part in the Winter Paralympic Games, and no athlete from this country has ever won a medal.

== Results ==
Athlete	Games	Sport	Event	Score	Rank
Farhan Hadafo	2016 Rio	Athletics	Men's 100 m T52	18.49	5th in heat 1; did not advance
Mahdi Abshir Omar	2024 Paris	Athletics	Men's shot put F57	4.17 m	12th

== See also ==
- Somalia at the Olympics
