= Athletics at the 2020 Summer Paralympics – Men's 100 metres T47 =

Men's 100 metres T47 at the XVI Paralympic Games
- Venue: Tokyo National Stadium
- Dates: 27 August 2021 (final)
- Competitors: 15 from 12 nations
- Winning time: 10.53

Medalists
| 1st place, gold medalist(s) | | Petrucio Ferreira dos Santos | Brazil |
| 2nd place, silver medalist(s) | | Michał Derus | Poland |
| 3rd place, bronze medalist(s) | | Washington Junior | Brazil |

Men's 100 metres
T11 · T12 · T13 · T33 · T34 · T35 · T36 · T37 · T38 · T47 · T51 · T52 · T53 · T54 · T63 · T64

The men's 100 metres T47 event at the 2020 Summer Paralympics in Tokyo, took place on 27 August 2021.

The T47 category is for athletes who have a single below elbow or wrist amputation or similar disability, with normal function in both legs.

== Records ==
Prior to the competition, the existing records were as follows:

| World Record | Petrúcio Ferreira (BRA) | 10.42 | Dubai, United Arab Emirates | 12 November 2019 |
| Paralympic Record | Petrúcio Ferreira (BRA) | 10.57 | Rio de Janeiro, Brazil | 11 September 2016 |

| Area | Time | Athlete | Nation |
|---|---|---|---|
| Africa | 10.72 | Ajibola Adeoye | Nigeria |
| America | 10.42 WR | Petrúcio Ferreira | Brazil |
| Asia | 10.79 | Wang Hao | China |
| Europe | 10.73 | Michał Derus | Poland |
| Oceania | 10.96 | Gabriel Cole | Australia |

== Results ==
=== Heats ===
Heat 1 took place on 27 August 2021, at 12:29:

| Rank | Lane | Name | Nationality | Class | Time | Notes |
|---|---|---|---|---|---|---|
| 1 | 2 | Washington Junior | Brazil | T47 | 10.64 | Q, SB |
| 2 | 7 | Michał Derus | Poland | T47 | 10.73 | Q, =AR |
| 3 | 3 | Lucas de Sousa Lima | Brazil | T46 | 11.07 | Q |
| 4 | 5 | Suwaibidu Galadima | Nigeria | T47 | 11.14 | q, SB |
| 5 | 9 | Kakeru Ishida | Japan | T46 | 11.15 | q, PB |
| 6 | 6 | Roderick Townsend-Roberts | United States | T46 | 11.22 | |
| 7 | 4 | Thomas Borg | Malta | T47 | 12.01 | PB |
| 8 | 8 | Davy Rendhel Moukagni Moukagni | Gabon | T46 | 12.12 | PB |

Heat 2 took place on 27 August 2021, at 12:36:

| Rank | Lane | Name | Nationality | Class | Time | Notes |
|---|---|---|---|---|---|---|
| 1 | 8 | Petrúcio Ferreira | Brazil | T47 | 10.75 | Q, |
| 2 | 3 | Wang Hao | China | T46 | 10.85 | Q, SB |
| 3 | 2 | Tanner Wright | United States | T46 | 11.14 | Q, SB |
| 4 | 7 | Ola Abidogun | Great Britain | T47 | 11.17 | SB |
| 5 | 6 | Jaydon Page | Australia | T47 | 11.18 | |
| 6 | 5 | Fayssal Atchiba | Benin | T46 | 11.35 | PB |
| 7 | 4 | Ibrahim Dayabou | Niger | T47 | 12.41 | SB |

=== Final ===
The final took place on 27 August 2021, at 19:33:

| Rank | Lane | Name | Nationality | Class | Time | Notes |
|---|---|---|---|---|---|---|
| 1st place, gold medalist(s) | 4 | Petrúcio Ferreira | Brazil | T47 | 10.53 | PR |
| 2nd place, silver medalist(s) | 7 | Michał Derus | Poland | T47 | 10.61 | AR |
| 3rd place, bronze medalist(s) | 6 | Washington Junior | Brazil | T47 | 10.68 | |
| 4 | 5 | Wang Hao | China | T46 | 10.74 | AR |
| 5 | 3 | Kakeru Ishida | Japan | T46 | 11.05 | PB |
| 6 | 8 | Lucas de Sousa Lima | Brazil | T46 | 11.14 | |
| 7 | 9 | Tanner Wright | United States | T46 | 11.21 | |
| 8 | 2 | Suwaibidu Galadima | Nigeria | T47 | 11.29 | |
