= Tajikistan at the Paralympics =

- IPC code: TJK
- NPC: Tajik Paralympic Committee
- Medals: Gold 0 Silver 0 Bronze 0 Total 0

Summer appearances
- 2004; 2008; 2012; 2016; 2020; 2024

Winter appearances
- 2018; 2022

Other related appearances
- Soviet Union (1988); Unified Team (1992)

Tajikistan made its Paralympic Games début at the 2004 Summer Paralympics in Athens, with a single representative (Parviz Odinaev) in powerlifting. Competing in the men's up to 60 kg category, Odinaev lifted 147.5 kg, finishing 9th out of 16. In 2008, Tajikistan was again represented by a single powerlifter, this time a woman: Zaytuna Roziqova, in the up to 48 kg category. She failed to correctly lift any weight and record a mark.

== Full results for Tajikistan at the Paralympics ==
Name	Games	Sport	Event	Score	Rank
Parviz Odinaev	2004 Athens	Powerlifting	Men's Up To 60 kg	147.5 kg	9th (out of 16)
Zaytuna Roziqova	2008 Beijing	Powerlifting	Women's Up To 48 kg	nmr	nmr (unranked)
Parviz Odinaev	2012 London	Powerlifting	Men's 75 kg	NMR	
Romikhudo Dodikhudoev	2016 Rio	Athletics	Men's 100 m T47	12.89	7th in heat 1; did not advance
Romikhudo Dodikhudoev	2016 Rio	Athletics	Men's 400 m T47	56.34	5th in heat 1; did not advance
Akmal Qodirov	2020 Tokyo	Athletics	Men's shot put F63	8.44 m	9th

== See also ==
- Tajikistan at the Olympics
