= Somalia at the 2016 Summer Paralympics =

- IPC code: SOM
- NPC: Somalia Paralympic Committee

in Rio de Janeiro
- Competitors: 1 in 1 sports
- Medals: Gold 0 Silver 0 Bronze 0 Total 0

Summer Paralympics appearances (overview)
- 2016; 2020; 2024

Somalia competed at the 2016 Summer Paralympics in Rio de Janeiro, Brazil from 7 to 18 September 2016. The country's participation in Rio marked its debut appearance in the quadrennial event, although it had competed in the Summer Olympics nine times since the 1972 Games. The delegation consisted of a single middle-distance runner, Farhan Adawe, who qualified for the Games by meeting qualification standards in March 2016. He was chosen as the flag bearer for the opening ceremony and came ninth overall in his event, the men's 100 metres (T52), which led to his elimination from the Paralympics.

== Background ==
Somalia had first competed in the Olympic Games at the 1972 Games in Munich, Germany. They participated on nine occasions prior to the 2016 Summer Paralympics, where they made their Summer Paralympics debut in Rio de Janeiro, Brazil, with the exception of the 1976 Summer Olympics in Montreal and the 1980 Summer Games in the Soviet Union, the former because of a boycott relating to the New Zealand national rugby union team touring South Africa earlier in 1976, and the latter because the country joined the United States-led boycott over the 1979 invasion of Afghanistan during the Soviet–Afghan War. The nation also did not compete in the 1992 Summer Olympics, despite participating in the opening ceremony, because of the ongoing famine affecting the country.

Somalia was one of six countries to make their first appearance in the Paralympic Games; the others were Aruba, Congo, Malawi, São Tomé and Príncipe and Togo. The country participated in the Rio Paralympic Games from 7 to 18 September 2016. The Somalia Paralympic Committee sent a single middle-distance runner, Farhan Adawe, (Note: Adawe's surname is actually Hadafo though the International Paralympic Committee lists it as the latter due to confusion with his father's name.) after the committee's secretary general Ali Ahmed Mohamud held discussions with Adawe about the opportunity to represent his country of which he accepted. A committee-formed goalball team composed of blind athletes failed to qualify for the Games. Two other Somali nationals competed at the 2016 Summer Paralympics, but under the citizenships of other countries; they were Abdi Dini, for Canada and Abdi Jama for Great Britain. Adawe was chosen as the flag bearer for the opening ceremony.

== Disability classifications ==
Every participant at the Paralympics has their disability grouped into one of five disability categories; amputation, the condition may be congenital or sustained through injury or illness; cerebral palsy; wheelchair athletes, there is often overlap between this and other categories; visual impairment, including blindness; Les autres, any physical disability that does not fall strictly under one of the other categories, for example dwarfism or multiple sclerosis. Each Paralympic sport then has its own classifications, dependent upon the specific physical demands of competition. Events are given a code, made of numbers and letters, describing the type of event and classification of the athletes competing. Some sports, such as athletics, divide athletes by both the category and severity of their disabilities, other sports, for example swimming, group competitors from different categories together, the only separation being based on the severity of the disability.

== Athletics ==
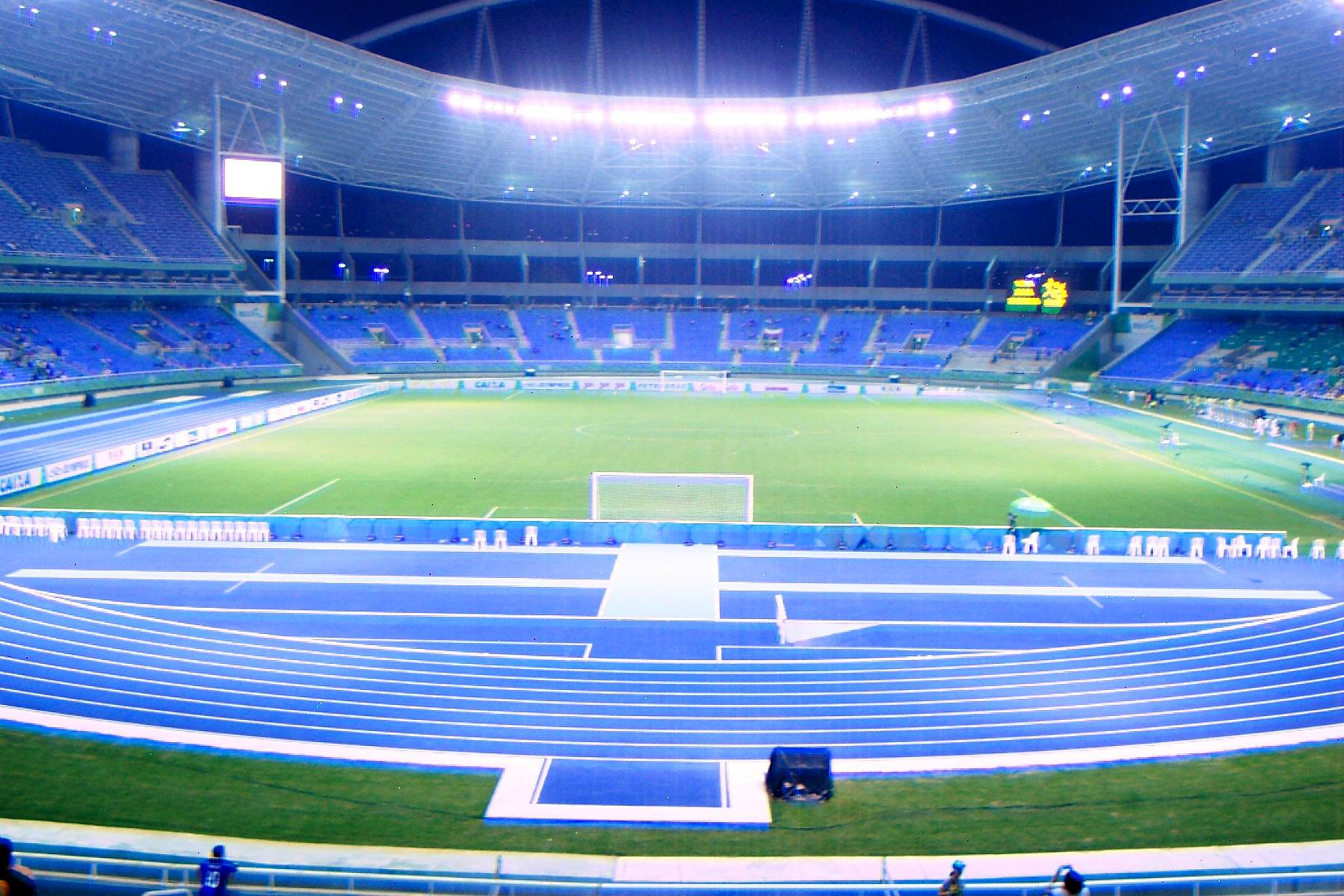
The Estádio Olímpico João Havelange, where Adawe competed in athletics events.

Farhan Adawe was the first Somali Paralympic athlete to compete at the quadrennial event and was 19 years old at the time of the Games. After the International Paralympic Committee granted Somalia's entry into the Paralympics, they requested that the nation make Adawe go through the routine qualifying procedures for all para-athletes. Adawe was placed in the T52 classification because his legs are unable to support him standing in an upright position and consequently used a wheelchair. He qualified for the Games by meeting qualification standards in a tournament held in Italy in March 2016 where he set a national record time of 18.83 seconds which was 1.67 seconds faster the standard qualifying time for the men's 100 metres (T52). Adawe was drawn in the contest's first heat on 9 September, finishing fifth out of eight competitors, with a time of 18.49 seconds. He placed ahead of Japan's Hirokazu Ueyonabaru (19.35 seconds) but behind Cristian Torres of Colombia (18.23) in a heat led by Gianfranco Iannotta of the United States (17.20 seconds). Adawe finished ninth out of fourteen para-athletes overall but did not advance into the final after being 0.08 seconds slower than the slowest competitor who made the last stage. Two months after the Games, he spoke of his desire to compete at the 2020 Summer Paralympics in Tokyo and wanted to promote para-sports in Somalia.

Men's Track

Athlete	Events	Heat		Final	
Athlete	Events	Time	Rank	Time	Rank
Farhan Adawe	100 m T52	18.49	5	did not advance	

== See also ==
- Somalia at the 2016 Summer Olympics
