= São Tomé and Príncipe at the 2024 Summer Paralympics =

- IPC code: STP

in Paris, France August 28, 2024 – September 8, 2024
- Competitors: 1 in 1 sport
- Flag bearer: Alex Anjos
- Medals: Gold 0 Silver 0 Bronze 0 Total 0

Summer Paralympics appearances (overview)
- 2016; 2020; 2024

São Tomé and Príncipe competed at the 2024 Summer Paralympics in Paris, France, from 28 August to 8 September 2024. This was the nation's third time competing at the Summer Paralympic Games after it made its debut at the 2016 Summer Paralympics. The delegation consisted of only one competitor from one sport.

== Competitors ==
The following is the list of number of competitors in the Games.

Sport	Men	Women	Total
Athletics	1	0	1
Total	1	0	1

== Athletics ==
Athlete	Event	Heat		Final	
Athlete	Event	Result	Rank	Result	Rank
Alex Anjos	Men's 400 metres T47	56.17	8	Did not advance	

== See also ==
- São Tomé and Príncipe at the 2024 Summer Olympics
- São Tomé and Príncipe at the Paralympics
