= Tajikistan at the 2008 Summer Paralympics =

- IPC code: TJK
- NPC: Tajik Paralympic Committee

in Beijing
- Competitors: 2 in 1 sport
- Flag bearers: Khayrullo Abdurahimov (opening & closing)
- Medals Ranked -th: Gold 0 Silver 0 Bronze 0 Total 0

Summer Paralympics appearances (overview)
- 2004; 2008; 2012; 2016; 2020; 2024

Other related appearances
- Soviet Union (1988); Unified Team (1992)

Tajikistan sent a delegation to compete at the 2008 Summer Paralympics in Beijing, People's Republic of China. The country was represented by two athletes, both competing in powerlifting. Flagbearer Khayrullo Abdurahimov, however, does not appear on his event's official scoresheet, so he seems to not have been active in the Paralympics.

== Powerlifting ==
Women

Athlete	Event	Result	Rank
Zaytuna Roziqova	-48 kg	No Mark	-

== See also ==
- Tajikistan at the Paralympics
- Tajikistan at the 2008 Summer Olympics
