= Togo at the 2024 Summer Paralympics =

- IPC code: TOG
- NPC: Togolese Federation of Paralympic Sport

in Paris, France August 28, 2024 – September 8, 2024
- Competitors: 1 in 1 sport
- Flag bearer: Séverin Ayao Kansa
- Medals: Gold 0 Silver 0 Bronze 0 Total 0

Summer Paralympics appearances (overview)
- 2016; 2020; 2024

Togo competed at the 2024 Summer Paralympics in Paris, France, from 28 August to 8 September 2024. This was the nation's third time competing at the Summer Paralympic Games after it made its debut at the 2016 Summer Paralympics. The delegation consisted of only one competitor from one sport.

== Competitors ==
The following is the list of number of competitors in the Games.

| Sport | Men | Women | Total |
|---|---|---|---|
| Athletics | 1 | 0 | 1 |
| Total | 1 | 0 | 1 |

== Athletics ==
| Athlete | Event | Final | |
| Athlete | Event | Result | Rank |
|---|---|---|---|
| Séverin Ayao Kansa | Men's high jump T47 | 1.88 | 10 |

== See also ==
- Togo at the 2024 Summer Olympics
- Togo at the Paralympics
