= Tajikistan at the 2020 Summer Paralympics =

- Flag of Tajikistan
- IPC code: TJK
- NPC: Tajik Paralympic Committee

in Tokyo, Japan August 24, 2021 – September 5, 2021
- Competitors: 1 in 1 sport
- Medals: Gold 0 Silver 0 Bronze 0 Total 0

Summer Paralympics appearances (overview)
- 2004; 2008; 2012; 2016; 2020; 2024

Other related appearances
- Soviet Union (1988); Unified Team (1992)

Tajikistan competed at the 2020 Summer Paralympics in Tokyo, Japan, from 24 August to 5 September 2021.

== Athletics ==
Tajikistan's only athlete at the Games, Akmal Qodirov, competed in the final of the men's shot put in the F63 classification on 4 September 2021.

Men's field

Athlete	Event	Final		
Athlete	Event	Result	Points	Rank
Akmal Qodirov	Shot put F63	8.44	—N/a	9

== See also ==
- Tajikistan at the Paralympics
- Tajikistan at the 2020 Summer Olympics
