= Tajikistan at the 2016 Summer Paralympics =

- IPC code: TJK
- NPC: Tajik Paralympic Committee

in Rio de Janeiro
- Competitors: 1 in 1 sports
- Flag bearer: Romikhudo Dodikhudoev
- Medals: Gold 0 Silver 0 Bronze 0 Total 0

Summer Paralympics appearances (overview)
- 2004; 2008; 2012; 2016; 2020; 2024

Other related appearances
- Soviet Union (1988); Unified Team (1992)

Tajikistan sent a delegation to compete at the 2016 Summer Paralympics in Rio de Janeiro, Brazil, from 7–18 September 2016. This was the fourth consecutive appearance of the country at the Paralympic Games after it made its debut twelve years prior at the 2004 Summer Paralympics. Tajikistan was represented by a single athlete in Rio de Janeiro: sprinter Romikhudo Dodikhudoev. He finished 14th overall in both of the men's 400 metres T47 and the men's 100 metres T47 and these performances meant he did not qualify for the final of both competitions.

== Background ==
Tajikistan first competed in Paralympic competition at the 2004 Summer Paralympics in Athens, Greece, and have competed at every Summer Paralympic Games since. This made Rio de Janeiro the country's fourth appearance at a Summer Paralympiad. The 2016 Summer Paralympics were held from 7–18 September 2016 with a total of 4,328 athletes representing 159 National Paralympic Committees (NPC) taking part. Tajikistan sent just one athlete to the Rio de Janeiro Paralympics: sprinter Romikhudo Dodikhudoev. He was accompanied by the chairman of the Tajik Paralympic Committee Safarali Boyev, secretary-general of the committee Abdurauf Olimov and an unnamed translator. The team could not find sponsorship from independent organisations and thus used its own funding to compete in the Games. Dodikhudoev was chosen to be the flag bearer for the parade of nations during the opening ceremony.

== Disability classifications ==
Every participant at the Paralympics has their disability grouped into one of five disability categories; amputation, the condition may be congenital or sustained through injury or illness; cerebral palsy; wheelchair athletes, there is often overlap between this and other categories; visual impairment, including blindness; Les autres, any physical disability that does not fall strictly under one of the other categories, for example dwarfism or multiple sclerosis. Each Paralympic sport then has its own classifications, dependent upon the specific physical demands of competition. Events are given a code, made of numbers and letters, describing the type of event and classification of the athletes competing. Some sports, such as athletics, divide athletes by both the category and severity of their disabilities, other sports, for example swimming, group competitors from different categories together, the only separation being based on the severity of the disability.

== Athletics ==
Romikhudo Dodikhudoev began suffering from the bone infection osteomyelitis at the age of five, and was left disabled because the local medical facilities could not provide him with decent treatment and his left arm consequently became shorter than his right arm. He was 26 years old at the time of the Rio Paralympic Games and he was making his debut in the Summer Paralympics. Dodikhudoev was assigned a quota place from the International Paralympic Committee to qualify for the Games because of his performance at the 2015 IWAS World Games in Sochi. He was coached by his trainer Gairat Negmatov. Before the Games, Dodikhudoev said, "My participation at the Paralympic Games is an indication that I have a strong spirit, that I am capable of achieving high goals, despite my physical disability. I want to show all the handicapped people that their physical disabilities should not stop them from achieving their goals." On 10 September, he competed in the heats of the men's 100 metres T47 event. Assigned to the first heat, Dodikhudoev finished the race in a time of 12.89 seconds, seventh and last of all the finishing athletes. (Note: Two athletes were disqualified in the heat stage.) The top eight runners advanced to the final and he did not as he was 14th overall out of 16 competitors. Six days later, Dodikhudoev participated in the men's 400 metres T47 competition, and was drawn into heat one. He placed fifth out of six sprinters with a time of 56.34 seconds. As with his previous event, only the top eight progressed to the final, and Dodikhudoev's competition came to an end as he ranked 14th overall out of 17 finishers. (Note: Three athletes were disqualified in the heats.)

=== Men's Track ===
Athlete	Events	Heat		Final	
Athlete	Events	Time	Rank	Time	Rank
Romikhudo Dodikhudoev	100 m T45-47	12.89	7	did not advance	
Romikhudo Dodikhudoev	400 m T45-47	56.34	5	did not advance	

== See also ==
- Tajikistan at the 2016 Summer Olympics
