= Benin at the 2008 Summer Paralympics =

- IPC code: BEN
- NPC: Federation Handisport du Benin-Comité National Paralympique

in Beijing
- Competitors: 1 in 1 sport
- Medals: Gold 0 Silver 0 Bronze 0 Total 0

Summer Paralympics appearances (overview)
- 2000; 2004; 2008; 2012; 2016; 2020; 2024

Benin sent a delegation to compete at the 2008 Summer Paralympics in Beijing, China. They were represented by one athlete, powerlifter Blandine Sahenou.

== Team ==
Benin participated in the 2008 Summer Paralympics, their third consecutive Games they participated in since making their debut at the 2000 Games. The country did not earn a medal in Beijing.

== Powerlifting ==
Benin was represented in Beijing by a powerlifter, their second consecutive time that they participated in the sport at the Paralympics. Blandine Sahenou was the country's powerlifter in Beijing.

Women

Athlete	Class	Event	Result	Rank
Blandine Sanehou	-	-67.5 kg	No valid lift	-

== See also ==
- Benin at the Paralympics
- Benin at the 2008 Summer Olympics
