= Tajikistan at the 2012 Summer Paralympics =

- IPC code: TJK
- NPC: Tajik Paralympic Committee

in London
- Competitors: 1 in 1 sport
- Medals: Gold 0 Silver 0 Bronze 0 Total 0

Summer Paralympics appearances (overview)
- 2004; 2008; 2012; 2016; 2020; 2024

Other related appearances
- Soviet Union (1988); Unified Team (1992)

Tajikistan competed at the 2012 Summer Paralympics in London, United Kingdom from August 29 to September 9, 2012.

== Powerlifting ==
Men

| Athlete | Event | Result | Rank |
|---|---|---|---|
| Parviz Odinaev | -75kg | NMR | |

== See also ==
- Tajikistan at the 2012 Summer Olympics
