= Benin at the Paralympics =

- IPC code: BEN
- NPC: Federation Handisport du Benin-Comité National Paralympique
- Medals: Gold 0 Silver 0 Bronze 0 Total 0

Summer appearances
- 2000; 2004; 2008; 2012; 2016; 2020; 2024

Benin made its Paralympic Games début at the 2000 Summer Paralympics in Sydney, sending a single representative (Edouard Agboessi) to compete in athletics. The country has competed at every edition of the Summer Paralympics since then, but has never taken part in the Winter Paralympics. No competitor for Benin has ever won a medal.

== Medal tables ==
=== Medals by Summer Games ===
Games	Athletes	Gold	Silver	Bronze	Total	Rank
2000 Sydney	1	0	0	0	0	-
2004 Athens	2	0	0	0	0	-
2008 Beijing	1	0	0	0	0	-
2012 London	1	0	0	0	0	-
2016 Rio de Janeiro	1	0	0	0	0	-
2020 Tokyo	2	0	0	0	0	-
2024 Paris	2	0	0	0	0	-
2028 Los Angeles	Future Event					
2032 Brisbane	Future Event					
Total		0	0	0	0	-

== Full results for Benin at the Paralympics ==
Name	Games	Sport	Event	Score	Rank
Edouard Agboessi	2000 Sydney	Athletics	Men's 100 m T11	13.42	2nd in heat 1; did not advance
Loukmane Nassirou	2004 Athens	Athletics	Men's 100 m T12	13.30	4th in heat 6; did not advance
Blandine Sahenou	2004 Athens	Powerlifting	Women's Up To 67.5 kg	50 kg	6th (out of 9)
Blandine Sahenou	2008 Beijing	Powerlifting	Women's Up To 67.5 kg	nmr	nmr (unranked)
Constant Kphonhinto	2012 London	Athletics	Men's Shot Put F57/58	8.25m	17th
Cosme Akpovi	2016 Rio	Athletics	Women's Javelin F57	27.37	13th
Fayssal Atchiba	2020 Tokyo	Athletics	Men's 100 m T47	11.35	6th in heat 2; did not advance
Marina Houndalowan	2020 Tokyo	Athletics	Women's Shot Put F57	6.06	13th
Fayssal Atchiba	2024 Paris	Athletics	Men's 100 m T47	11.24	5th in heat 2; did not advance
Marina Houndalowan	2024 Paris	Athletics	Women's Shot Put F57	5.59	12th

== See also ==
- Benin at the Olympics
