= Benin at the 2016 Summer Paralympics =

- IPC code: BEN
- NPC: Federation Handisport du Benin-Comité National Paralympique

in Rio de Janeiro
- Competitors: 1 in 1 sports
- Flag bearer: Cosme Akpovi
- Medals: Gold 0 Silver 0 Bronze 0 Total 0

Summer Paralympics appearances (overview)
- 2000; 2004; 2008; 2012; 2016; 2020; 2024

Benin competed at the 2016 Summer Paralympics in Rio de Janeiro, Brazil, from 7 September to 18 September 2016. The country was represented by one sportsperson, Cosme Akpovi, competing in the men's javelin F57 event where he finished thirteenth. The Games were not broadcast in Benin.

== Delegation ==
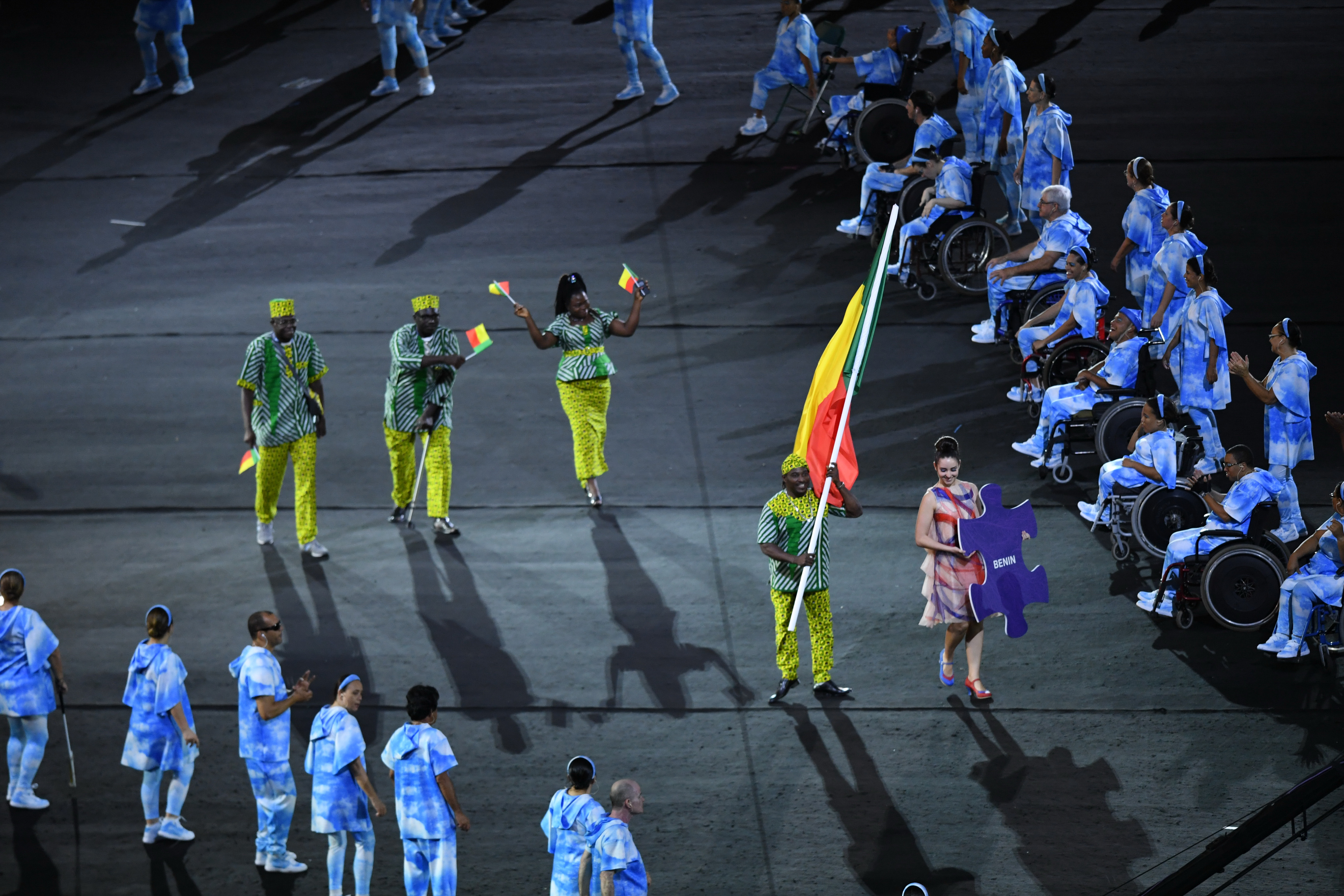
Cerimônia de abertura dos Jogos Paralímpicos Rio1

The country sent one male athlete, Cosme Akpovi, to the 2016 Summer Paralympics. He competed in athletics and served as the country's flag bearer during the opening ceremony.

Benin's delegation in Rio included three other people, the national team coach, the secretary general of the Benin Paralympic Committee and a representative of the Ministry of Sports

== The future ==
Ahead of the 2016 Games, Benin's National Paralympic Committee launched a talent identification program, with the goal of identifying more athletes who could potentially represent the country at the 2020 Games.

== Athletics ==
Akpovi took up athletics in 2003, having had little international experience. He had previously competed at the 2013 IPC Athletics World Championships, finishing fourteenth in the men's Javelin Throw F57/58 with a best throw of 22.60m. In Rio, he finished thirteenth in the men's javelin F57 event with a best throw of 27.37 meters.

Men's Field

Athlete	Events	Result	Rank
Cosme Akpovi	Javelin 57	27.37	13

== Media ==
There were no broadcast rights holders for the 2016 Games in Benin. People who wanted to watch them had to watch them via the live stream provided by the International Paralympic Committee.

== See also ==
- Benin at the 2016 Summer Olympics
