= Benin at the 2000 Summer Paralympics =

- IPC code: BEN
- NPC: Federation Handisport du Benin-Comité National Paralympique

in Sydney
- Competitors: 1 in 1 sport
- Medals: Gold 0 Silver 0 Bronze 0 Total 0

Summer Paralympics appearances (overview)
- 2000; 2004; 2008; 2012; 2016; 2020; 2024

Benin made its Paralympic Games début at the 2000 Summer Paralympics in Sydney. It sent a single athlete, blind runner Edouard Agboessi, to compete in athletics. Agboessi failed to make it out of the heats in the men's 100 m T11 event.

== Team ==
Benin made their Paralympic debut at the 2000 Games. The country sent a single athlete, blind runner Edouard Agboessi, to compete in athletics. Agboessi would later be a member the Benin vision impaired organization, "Réseau des associations des personnes handicapées de l'Atlantique et du Littoral (Raphal)". He was part of 2015 efforts to encourage people with disabilities to vote in upcoming elections.

== Athletics ==
Agboessi ran in the first heat of his event, against Julio Requena of Spain and Aina Onja of Madagascar, with Cuba's Jorge Jay Masso being a non-starter. Agboessi's time of 13.42 was faster than Onja's (13.98), but slower than Requena's (12.50), and too slow to advance to the next round. Requena was the slowest qualifier.

Name	Sport	Event	Time	Rank
Edouard Agboessi	Athletics	Men's 100 m T11	13.42	2nd in heat 1; did not advance

== See also ==
- Benin at the Paralympics
- Benin at the 2000 Summer Olympics
