= Benin at the 2012 Summer Paralympics =

- IPC code: BEN
- NPC: Federation Handisport du Benin-Comité National Paralympique

in London
- Competitors: 1 in 1 sport
- Medals: Gold 0 Silver 0 Bronze 0 Total 0

Summer Paralympics appearances (overview)
- 2000; 2004; 2008; 2012; 2016; 2020; 2024

Benin competed at the 2012 Summer Paralympics in London, United Kingdom from 29 August to 9 September 2012. The athlete delegation consisted of one athlete, Constant Kponhinto, who competed in the men's Shot Put F57-58 event, finishing 17th overall with a best throw of 8.25 meters.

== Team ==
Competing in their fourth Paralympic Games, Benin had a one athlete strong delegation, represented by·Constant Kponhinto. Kponhinto served as the country's flag bearer for the Opening Ceremonies. At the time, he lived in Abomey, Benin, the town where he grew up and first took up sport in as a child. He graduated from National University of Benin. Kponhinto had a disability since he was a one-year-old as a result of complications from having contracted polio.

The delegation stayed at Lucia Heights and Meander House in the Paralympic Village. Benin and Mauritius were officially welcomed to the Paralympic Village ahead of the Games around the same time. They were welcomed by Paralympic Village Mayor Eva Löffler, daughter of Paralympic Games founder Ludwig Guttmann.

Kponhinto arrived in London a week ahead of the Games. While he did some shopping in London, he largely did so within the confines of the Paralympic Village because of self-consciousness about only speaking French.

== Athletics ==
Constant Kponhinto competed in the men's Shot Put F57-58 event, finishing 17th overall with a best throw of 8.25 meters. While he was disappointed with not performing better in London, he left having bettered his personal best at the Games. He qualified for the Games based on a wildcard invitation, designed to increase the number of countries participating at the Paralympics.

Men's field

| Athlete | Event | Mark | Points | Rank |
|---|---|---|---|---|
| Constant Kponhinto | Men's shot put F57-58 | 8.25 m | 268 | 17 |

== See also ==
- Benin at the Paralympics
- Benin at the 2012 Summer Olympics
