= Togo at the 2016 Summer Paralympics =

- IPC code: TOG
- NPC: Togolese Federation of Paralympic Sport

in Rio de Janeiro
- Competitors: 1 in 1 sports
- Flag bearer: Aliou Bawa
- Medals: Gold 0 Silver 0 Bronze 0 Total 0

Summer Paralympics appearances (overview)
- 2016; 2020; 2024

Togo competed at the 2016 Summer Paralympics held in Rio de Janeiro, Brazil from 7 to 18 September 2016. The country's participation in Rio marked its debut appearance in the quadrennial event, although it had competed in the Summer Olympics nine times since the 1972 Games. The delegation consisted of a single lightweight powerlifter, Aliou Bawa, who qualified by being issued a Bipartite Commission Invitation spot by the International Paralympic Committee. Bawa was the flag bearer for the opening ceremony. Bawa failed to record a mark in the men's 49 kg category after being unable to lift 113 kilograms of weight in his three attempts.

== Background ==
Togo first competed at the 1972 Olympic Games in Munich, Germany. They participated in the Olympics on nine prior occasions with the exception of the 1976 Summer Olympics in Montreal and the 1980 Summer Games in the Soviet Union, the former because of a boycott relating to the New Zealand national rugby union team touring South Africa earlier in 1976, and the latter because the country joined the United States-led boycott over the 1979 invasion of Afghanistan during the Soviet–Afghan War. Togo was one of six countries to make their debut at the 2016 Paralympics held in Rio de Janeiro from 7 to 18 September: the others were Aruba, Congo, Malawi, Somalia and São Tomé and Príncipe. The Togolese Federation of Paralympic Sport sent a single lightweight powerlifter to the games, Aliou Bawa. He flew to Brazil on 29 August, and was accompanied by his coach Gneny Tchagbele and committee attache Fidéle Mawuena. Bawa was selected as the flag bearer for the opening ceremony.

== Disability classifications ==
Every participant at the Paralympics has their disability grouped into one of five disability categories; amputation, the condition may be congenital or sustained through injury or illness; cerebral palsy; wheelchair athletes, there is often overlap between this and other categories; visual impairment, including blindness; Les autres, any physical disability that does not fall strictly under one of the other categories, for example dwarfism or multiple sclerosis. Each Paralympic sport then has its own classifications, dependent upon the specific physical demands of competition. Events are given a code, made of numbers and letters, describing the type of event and classification of the athletes competing. Some sports, such as athletics, divide athletes by both the category and severity of their disabilities, other sports, for example swimming, group competitors from different categories together, the only separation being based on the severity of the disability.

== Powerlifting ==
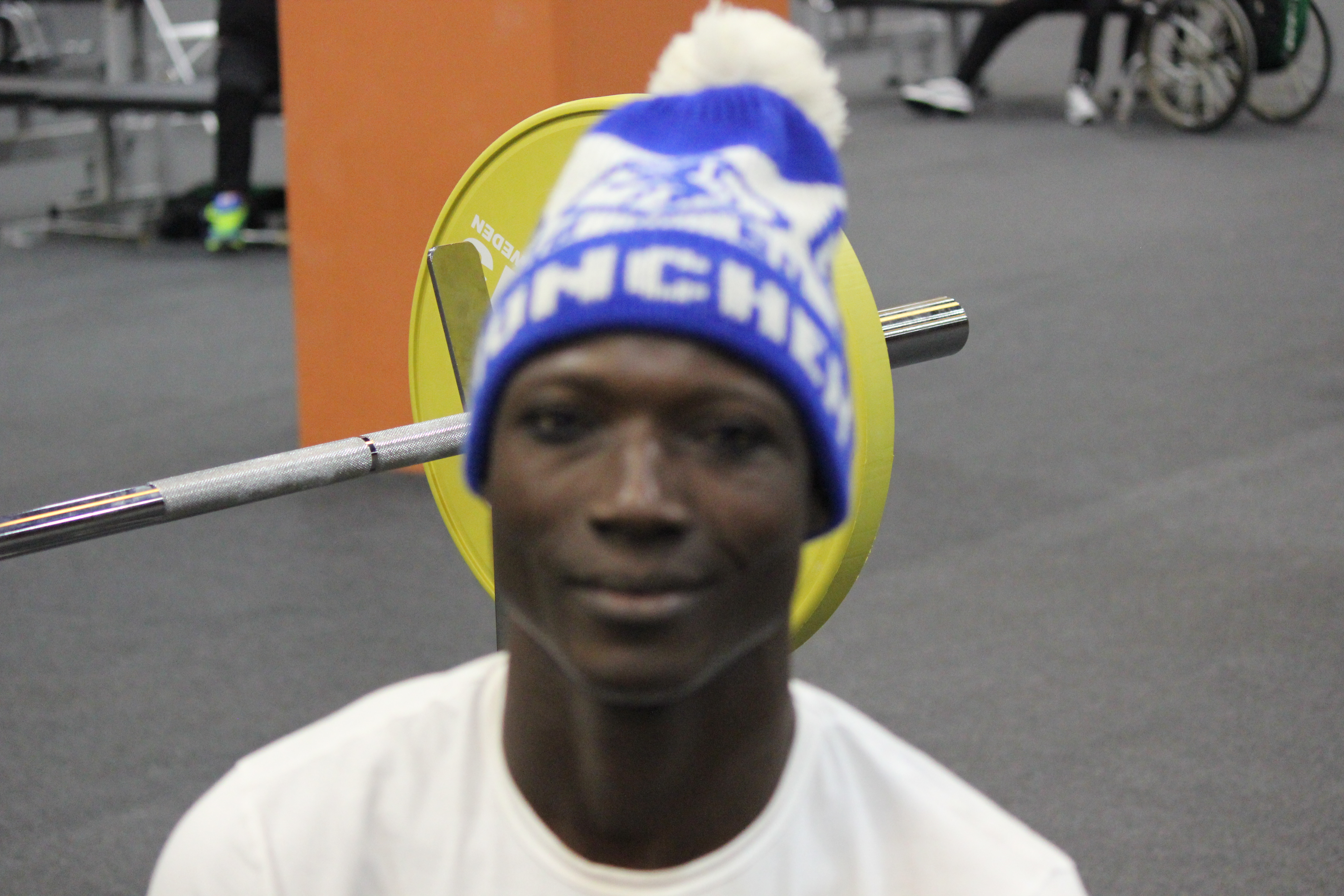
Aliou Bawa, Togo's powerlifter for the Rio Paralympics.

Aliou Bawa, rendered disabled as a consequence of contracting polio as an infant, was the first Togolese Paralympic athlete to compete at the quadrennial event and was 32 years old at the time of the Games. He qualified for the games through the International Paralympic Committee who issued him a Bipartite Commission Invitation spot for the men's 49 kg powerlifting category after bettering his personal record from the 2015 African Games the month prior to the Rio Paralympics. Bawa intensively trained at a fitness centre in the Togolese capital city of Lomé by receiving a grant from the local sporting authorities and later Pavilion 5 at Riocentro to prepare for the Games. He spoke of his belief that he would win a medal at the Rio Paralympics. In Pavillon 2 at Riocentro on 8 September, Bawa performed poorly and was unable to lift 113 kilograms in his three attempts, leaving him without a recorded mark. Despite Bawa's poor result, he stated that he was aware of how difficult it was and spoke of his desire to commence his training for the 2020 Summer Paralympics in Tokyo, while a Togolese sports observer wrote, "It's already our victory, because no one even the biggest and serious predictions had predicted it." Bawa's performance also revived debate over funding for Togolese para-athletes.

Athlete	Event	Result	Rank
Aliou Bawa	Men's −49 kg	No Mark	

== See also ==
- Togo at the 2016 Summer Olympics
