= Benin at the 2024 Summer Paralympics =

- Flag of Benin
- IPC code: BEN
- NPC: Federation Handisport du Benin-Comité National Paralympique

in Paris, France August 28, 2024 – September 8, 2024
- Competitors: 2 (1 man and 1 woman) in 1 sport
- Flag bearer: Marina Houndalowan
- Medals: Gold 0 Silver 0 Bronze 0 Total 0

Summer Paralympics appearances (overview)
- 2000; 2004; 2008; 2012; 2016; 2020; 2024

Benin competed at the 2024 Summer Paralympics in Paris, France, from 28 August to 8 September. It did not win any medals.

== Competitors ==
The following is the list of number of competitors in the Games.

Sport	Men	Women	Total
Athletics	1	1	2
Total	1	1	2

== Athletics ==
Key

- Note–Ranks given for track events are within the athlete's heat only
- Q = Qualified for the next round
- q = Qualified for the next round as a fastest loser or, in field events, by position without achieving the qualifying target
- DQ = Disqualified
- PR = Paralympic Record
- AR = Area (or continental) Record
- NR = National Record
- SB = Season's Best
- N/A = Round not applicable for the event
- Bye = Athlete not required to compete in round

Track & road events
Men

Athlete	Event	Heat		Final	
Athlete	Event	Result	Rank	Result	Rank
Fayssal Atchiba	Men's 100 m T47	11.24	5	Did not advance	

Field events
Women

Athlete	Event	Qualification		Final	
Athlete	Event	Result	Rank	Result	Rank
Marina Houndalowan	Women's shot put F57	6.11	4 q	5.59	12

== See also ==
- Benin at the 2024 Summer Olympics
- Benin at the Paralympics
