= Somalia at the 2024 Summer Paralympics =

- IPC code: SOM
- NPC: Somalia Paralympic Committee

in Paris, France August 28, 2024 – September 8, 2024
- Competitors: 1 in 1 sport
- Flag bearer: Mahdi Abshir Omar
- Medals: Gold 0 Silver 0 Bronze 0 Total 0

Summer Paralympics appearances (overview)
- 2016; 2020; 2024

Somalia competed at the 2024 Summer Paralympics in Paris, France, from 28 August to 8 September 2024. This was the nation's third time competing at the Summer Paralympic Games after it made its debut at the 2016 Summer Paralympics. The delegation consisted of only one Athlete from one sport.

== Competitors ==
The following is the list of number of competitors in the Games.

Sport	Men	Women	Total
Athletics	1	0	1
Total	1	0	1

== Athletics ==
Athlete	Event	Final	
Athlete	Event	Result	Rank
Mahdi Abshir Omar	Men's shot put F57	4.17	12

== See also ==
- Somalia at the 2024 Summer Olympics
- Somalia at the Paralympics
