= Togo at the 2020 Summer Paralympics =

- IPC code: TOG
- NPC: Togolese Federation of Paralympic Sport

in Tokyo
- Competitors: 1 in 1 sports
- Flag bearer: Koumealo Kabissa
- Medals: Gold 0 Silver 0 Bronze 0 Total 0

Summer Paralympics appearances (overview)
- 2016; 2020; 2024

Togo sent a delegation to the 2020 Summer Paralympics held in Tokyo, Japan from 24 August to 5 September 2021. This marks the nation's second appearance at a Paralympic Games.

== Background ==
Togo first participated at the 2016 Summer Paralympics after Aliou Bawa was given a spot for Powerlifting.

The International Paralympic Committee offered free-to-air coverage to Togo during the games.

The flag handing ceremony of the Togo flag was handed at the Prime Minister's office by Victoire Tomegah Dogbé on 13 July 2021.

== Disability classifications ==
Every participant at the Paralympics has their disability grouped into one of five disability categories; amputation, the condition may be congenital or sustained through injury or illness; cerebral palsy; wheelchair athletes, there is often overlap between this and other categories; visual impairment, including blindness; Les autres, any physical disability that does not fall strictly under one of the other categories, for example dwarfism or multiple sclerosis. Each Paralympic sport then has its own classifications, dependent upon the specific physical demands of competition. Events are given a code, made of numbers and letters, describing the type of event and classification of the athletes competing. Some sports, such as athletics, divide athletes by both the category and severity of their disabilities, other sports, for example swimming, group competitors from different categories together, the only separation being based on the severity of the disability.

== Athletics ==
Koumealo Kabissa was the only athlete representing Togo during the Paralympics, she aimed for a medal during the games. She got 14th out of 20th during the Women's Shot Put F57, thus not succeeding her goal of getting a medal. She landed back in Togo at Lomé International Airport on 9 September 2021.

Field

Athlete	Event	Final	
Result	Rank	Result	Rank
Koumealo Kabissa	Women's Shot Put F57	5.92	14

== See also ==
- 2020 Summer Paralympics
- Athletics at the 2020 Summer Paralympics
- Togo at the 2020 Summer Olympics
