= Michał Derus =

Polish Paralympic athlete

Michał Derus 100m record: 10.72 s
Personal information
- Born: Michał Mateusz Derus; 21 September 1990 (age 36) Tarnów, Poland

Sport
- Disability class: T47
- Club: AZS PWSZ Tarnow
Medal record
Event	1st	2nd	3rd
Paralympic Games	0	1	0
World Championships	2	3	1
European Championships	3	0	0
Men's athletics
Representing Poland
Summer Paralympics
Silver medal – second place	2016 Rio	100 m T47
Silver medal – second place	2020 Tokyo	100 m 47
World Championships
Gold medal – first place	2013 Lyon	100 m T46
Gold medal – first place	2015 Doha	100 m T47
Silver medal – second place	2013 Lyon	200 m T46
Silver medal – second place	2015 Doha	200 m T47
Silver medal – second place	2024 Kobe	100 m T47
Bronze medal – third place	2017 London	100 m T47
European Championships
Gold medal – first place	2014 Swansea	100 m T47
Gold medal – first place	2014 Swansea	200 m T47
Gold medal – first place	2016 Grosseto	100 m T47

Michał Derus (born 21 September 1990) is a Polish track and field athlete, competing in the T47 disability classification for athletes with an impairment to a lower arm.

== Personal history ==
Derus was born in Tarnów, Poland in 1990. Derus was born with dysmelia in his left hand which left it underdeveloped.

== Sporting history ==
Derus took up sport whilst in secondary school. He initially chose swimming but switched to athletics stating that he enjoyed the adrenaline rush in the build up to a race. He wanted to compete in Parasport events, but a ruling disqualified him from being classified. In 2008 he was on the verge of quitting athletics but was persuaded to remain by his coach who believed the ruling would be overturned in the future.

In 2013 Derus was finally able to compete in para athletics and was classified as a T47 sprinter. He entered his first major international competition that year, representing Poland at the 2013 IPC Athletics World Championships in Lyon. There he won a gold in the 100 metre sprint and a silver in the 200 metre. He followed this with double gold in both events at the 2014 IPC Athletics European Championships in Swansea. In 2015 he successfully defended his World 100 metre title in Doha, and again won silver in the 200 metres. The 2015 World Championships also saw Derus compete in the long jump, finishing ninth with a distance of 6.24m.

In 2016 he travelled to Rio to compete in the 2016 Summer Paralympics. He competed in the 100 metre sprint and the long jump. Although failing to qualify through the heats of the long jump, finishing 11th overall, he finished second in the heats of the 100m to take him through to the finals. In the finals, he posted a time of 10.79 seconds in a photo finish for the silver medal behind Brazil's Petrúcio Ferreira. 2016 also saw Derus claim a second European medal with victory in the 100 metres in Grosseto.
