= Benin at the 2004 Summer Paralympics =

- IPC code: BEN
- NPC: Federation Handisport du Benin-Comité National Paralympique

in Athens
- Competitors: 2 in 2 sports
- Flag bearer: Akouavi Bladine Sahenou
- Medals: Gold 0 Silver 0 Bronze 0 Total 0

Summer Paralympics appearances (overview)
- 2000; 2004; 2008; 2012; 2016; 2020; 2024

Benin competed at the 2004 Summer Paralympics in Athens, Greece. Their delegation included two sportspeople, neither of whom were medaled.

== Sports ==
The team included two athletes, one man and one woman, of which none won a medal. Benin was one of a number of nations with a small delegation competing in Athens. One of the country's representatives was powerlifter Akouavi Bladine Sahenou, the other athlete Loukmane Nassirou. He acquired vision impairment and was a member of the athletics club, Almighty Wheelchair: Benin. Neither earned a medal.

=== Athletics ===
Athlete	Class	Event	Heats		Semifinal		Final	
Athlete	Class	Event	Result	Rank	Result	Rank	Result	Rank
Loukmane Nassirou	T12	100m	13.30	27	did not advance			

=== Powerlifting ===
Athlete	Event	Result	Rank
Akouavi Bladine Sahenou	Women's 67.5kg	50.0	6

== See also ==
- Benin at the Paralympics
- Benin at the 2004 Summer Olympics
