= Togo at the Paralympics =

- IPC code: TOG
- Medals: Gold 0 Silver 0 Bronze 0 Total 0

Summer appearances
- 2016; 2020; 2024

Togo first competed at the Paralympic Games in 2016, at the Summer Games in Rio de Janeiro, Brazil. Togo sent one athlete to compete in Powerlifting events. This paralympian competed from a wheelchair. Togo has never taken part in the Winter Paralympic Games, and no athlete from the country has ever won a Paralympic medal.

== Full results for Togo at the Paralympics ==
Name	Games	Sport	Event	Score	Rank
	1	Powerlifting	Wheelchair Powerlifting		Not qualified

== See also ==
- Togo at the Olympics
