= Athletics at the 2016 Summer Paralympics – Men's 100 metres T52 =

Men's 100 metres T52 at the XV Paralympic Games
- Venue: Estádio Olímpico João Havelange
- Dates: 9–10 September 2016
- Competitors: 14 from 12 nations

Medalists
1st place, gold medalist(s)		Gianfranco Iannotta	United States
2nd place, silver medalist(s)		Raymond Martin	United States
3rd place, bronze medalist(s)		Salvador Hernandez Mondragon	Mexico

The T52 category is for wheelchair athletes with damage to spinal cord in the higher parts of the back, substantially impaired or no trunk function, and minimal or no leg function. Pushing power comes from elbow extensions, and appears close to normal except for use of modified gloves to compensate for grip.

The Athletics at the 2016 Summer Paralympics – Men's 100 metres T52 event at the 2016 Paralympic Games took place on 9–10 September 2016, at the Estádio Olímpico João Havelange.

== Heats ==
=== Heat 1 ===
10:21 9 September 2016:

Rank	Lane	Bib	Name	Nationality	Reaction	Time	Notes
1	6	2359	Gianfranco Iannotta	United States		17.20	Q
2	2	2053	Mario Trindade	Portugal		17.94	Q
3	8	2176	Beat Boesch	Switzerland		17.94	Q
4	7	1309	Cristian Torres	Colombia		18.23	q
5	3	2135	Farhan Adawe	Somalia		18.49	
6	4	1745	Hirokazu Ueyonabaru	Japan		19.35	
7	5	1827	Kestutis Skucas	Lithuania		21.03	

=== Heat 2 ===
10:27 9 September 2016:

Rank	Lane	Bib	Name	Nationality	Reaction	Time	Notes
1	8	2363	Raymond Martin	United States		17.27	Q
2	4	1876	Salvador Hernandez Mondragon	Mexico		17.80	Q
3	3	1058	Sam McIntosh	Australia		17.92	Q
4	6	2370	Josh Roberts	United States		18.41	q
5	7	2231	Pichaya Kurattanasiri	Thailand		19.18	
6	5	1074	Thomas Geierspichler	Austria		19.82	
7	2	2001	Jerrold Pete Mangliwan	Philippines		20.04	

== Final ==
10:48 10 September 2016:

Rank	Lane	Bib	Name	Nationality	Reaction	Time	Notes
1st place, gold medalist(s)	6	2359	Gianfranco Iannotta	United States		17.17	
2nd place, silver medalist(s)	5	2363	Raymond Martin	United States		17.25	
3rd place, bronze medalist(s)	3	1876	Salvador Hernandez Mondragon	Mexico		17.69	
4	8	1058	Sam McIntosh	Australia		18.13	
5	7	2176	Beat Boesch	Switzerland		18.19	
6	4	2053	Mario Trindade	Portugal		18.19	
7	2	1309	Cristian Torres	Colombia		18.33	
8	1	2370	Josh Roberts	United States		18.39	
