= List of Paralympic teams by medals won =

Tabulated below are the performance of the top-3 finish places on the medal table and overall rankings for this teams on the Summer Paralympics and Winter Paralympics, based on individual Games medals tables.

== Summer Paralympics ==
=== List by games ===
Games	1st place	med	2nd place	med	3rd place	med	Nations with medals
1960 Rome	Italy	29	Great Britain	20	West Germany	15	17
1960 Rome	Italy	28	Great Britain	15	West Germany	6	17
1960 Rome	Italy	23	Great Britain	20	West Germany	9	17
1964 Tokyo	United States	50	Great Britain	18	Italy	14	17
1964 Tokyo	United States	41	Great Britain	23	Italy	15	17
1964 Tokyo	United States	32	Great Britain	20	Italy	16	17
1968 Tel Aviv	United States	33	Great Britain	29	Israel	18	22
1968 Tel Aviv	United States	27	Great Britain	20	Israel	21	22
1968 Tel Aviv	United States	39	Great Britain	20	Israel	23	22
1972 Heidelberg	West Germany	28	United States	17	Great Britain	16	31
1972 Heidelberg	West Germany	17	United States	27	Great Britain	15	31
1972 Heidelberg	West Germany	22	United States	15	Great Britain	21	31
1976 Toronto	United States	66	Netherlands	45	Israel	40	33
1976 Toronto	United States	44	Netherlands	25	Israel	13	33
1976 Toronto	United States	45	Netherlands	14	Israel	16	33
1980 Arnhem	United States	75	Poland	75	West Germany	68	40
1980 Arnhem	United States	66	Poland	50	West Germany	48	40
1980 Arnhem	United States	54	Poland	52	West Germany	46	40
1984 Stoke Mandeville / New York	United States	136	Great Britain	107	Canada	87	43
1984 Stoke Mandeville / New York	United States	131	Great Britain	112	Canada	82	43
1984 Stoke Mandeville / New York	United States	129	Great Britain	112	Canada	69	43
1988 Seoul	United States	92	West Germany	76	Great Britain	64	49
1988 Seoul	United States	90	West Germany	66	Great Britain	66	49
1988 Seoul	United States	91	West Germany	51	Great Britain	53	49
1992 Barcelona / Madrid	United States	75	Germany	61	Great Britain	42	60
1992 Barcelona / Madrid	United States	52	Germany	51	Great Britain	51	60
1992 Barcelona / Madrid	United States	48	Germany	59	Great Britain	46	60
1996 Atlanta	United States	47	Australia	42	Germany	40	60
1996 Atlanta	United States	46	Australia	32	Germany	58	60
1996 Atlanta	United States	66	Australia	27	Germany	51	60
2000 Sydney	Australia	63	Great Britain	41	Canada	38	68
2000 Sydney	Australia	39	Great Britain	43	Canada	33	68
2000 Sydney	Australia	47	Great Britain	27	Canada	25	68
2004 Athens	China	63	Great Britain	35	Canada	28	75
2004 Athens	China	46	Great Britain	30	Canada	19	75
2004 Athens	China	32	Great Britain	29	Canada	25	75
2008 Beijing	China	89	Great Britain	42	United States	36	76
2008 Beijing	China	70	Great Britain	29	United States	35	76
2008 Beijing	China	52	Great Britain	31	United States	28	76
2012 London	China	95	Russia	36	Great Britain	34	75
2012 London	China	71	Russia	38	Great Britain	43	75
2012 London	China	65	Russia	28	Great Britain	43	75
2016 Rio de Janeiro	China	107	Great Britain	64	Ukraine	41	83
2016 Rio de Janeiro	China	81	Great Britain	39	Ukraine	37	83
2016 Rio de Janeiro	China	51	Great Britain	44	Ukraine	39	83
2020 Tokyo	China	96	Great Britain	41	United States	37	86
2020 Tokyo	China	60	Great Britain	38	United States	36	86
2020 Tokyo	China	51	Great Britain	45	United States	31	86
2024 Paris	China	94	Great Britain	49	United States	36	85
2024 Paris	China	76	Great Britain	44	United States	42	85
2024 Paris	China	50	Great Britain	42	United States	27	85

=== List by team ===
Medalists
Rank	Nation	1st place	2nd place	3rd place
1	United States (USA)	8	1	3
2	China (CHN)	6	0	0
3	Germany (GER)	1	2	3
4	Australia (AUS)	1	1	0
5	Italy (ITA)	1	0	1
6	Great Britain (GBR)	0	10	4
7	Netherlands (NED)	0	1	0
7	Poland (POL)	0	1	0
7	Russia (RUS)	0	1	0
10	Canada (CAN)	0	0	3
11	Israel (ISR)	0	0	2
12	Ukraine (UKR)	0	0	1
Total	12 nations	17	17	17

== Winter Paralympics ==
=== List by games ===
Games	1st place	med	2nd place	med	3rd place	med
1976 Örnsköldsvik	West Germany	10	Switzerland	10	Finland	8
1976 Örnsköldsvik	West Germany	12	Switzerland	1	Finland	7
1976 Örnsköldsvik	West Germany	6	Switzerland	1	Finland	7
1980 Geilo	Norway	23	Finland	15	Austria	6
1980 Geilo	Norway	21	Finland	7	Austria	10
1980 Geilo	Norway	10	Finland	12	Austria	6
1984 Innsbruck	Austria	34	Finland	19	Norway	15
1984 Innsbruck	Austria	19	Finland	9	Norway	13
1984 Innsbruck	Austria	17	Finland	6	Norway	13
1988 Innsbruck	Norway	25	Austria	20	West Germany	9
1988 Innsbruck	Norway	21	Austria	10	West Germany	11
1988 Innsbruck	Norway	14	Austria	14	West Germany	10
1992 Tignes-Albertville	United States	20	Germany	12	Unified Team	10
1992 Tignes-Albertville	United States	16	Germany	17	Unified Team	8
1992 Tignes-Albertville	United States	9	Germany	9	Unified Team	3
1994 Lillehammer	Norway	29	Germany	25	United States	24
1994 Lillehammer	Norway	22	Germany	21	United States	12
1994 Lillehammer	Norway	13	Germany	18	United States	7
1998 Nagano	Norway	18	Germany	14	United States	13
1998 Nagano	Norway	9	Germany	17	United States	8
1998 Nagano	Norway	13	Germany	13	United States	13
2002 Salt Lake City	Germany	17	United States	10	Norway	10
2002 Salt Lake City	Germany	1	United States	22	Norway	3
2002 Salt Lake City	Germany	15	United States	11	Norway	6
2006 Turin	Russia	13	Germany	8	Ukraine	7
2006 Turin	Russia	13	Germany	5	Ukraine	9
2006 Turin	Russia	7	Germany	5	Ukraine	9
2010 Vancouver	Germany	13	Russia	12	Canada	10
2010 Vancouver	Germany	5	Russia	16	Canada	5
2010 Vancouver	Germany	6	Russia	10	Canada	4
2014 Sochi	Russia	30	Germany	9	Canada	7
2014 Sochi	Russia	28	Germany	5	Canada	2
2014 Sochi	Russia	22	Germany	1	Canada	7
2018 Pyeongchang	United States	13	Neutral Paralympic Athletes	8	Canada	8
2018 Pyeongchang	United States	15	Neutral Paralympic Athletes	10	Canada	4
2018 Pyeongchang	United States	8	Neutral Paralympic Athletes	6	Canada	16
2022 Beijing	China	18	Ukraine	10	Canada	8
2022 Beijing	China	19	Ukraine	10	Canada	5
2022 Beijing	China	23	Ukraine	8	Canada	11
2026 Milano Cortina	China	15	United States	13	Russia	8
2026 Milano Cortina	China	13	United States	5	Russia	1
2026 Milano Cortina	China	16	United States	6	Russia	3

=== List by team ===
Medalists
Rank	Nation	1st place	2nd place	3rd place
1	Norway (NOR)	4	0	2
2	Germany (GER)	3	5	1
3	United States (USA)	2	2	2
4	Russia (RUS)	2	1	1
5	China (CHN)	2	0	0
6	Austria (AUT)	1	1	1
7	Finland (FIN)	0	2	1
8	Ukraine (UKR)	0	1	1
9	Switzerland (SUI)	0	1	0
9	Neutral Paralympic Athletes (NPA)	0	1	0
11	Canada (CAN)	0	0	4
12	Unified Team (EUN)	0	0	1
Total	14 nations	14	14	14
