= Athletics at the 2016 Summer Paralympics – Men's 400 metres T47 =

Event at the 2016 Summer Paralympics

Men's 400 metres T47 at the XV Paralympic Games
- Venue: Estádio Olímpico João Havelange
- Dates: 16–17 September 2016
- Competitors: 20 from 18 nations
- Winning time: 48.79

Medalists
1st place, gold medalist(s)		Ernesto Blanco	Cuba
2nd place, silver medalist(s)		Petrucio Ferreira dos Santos	Brazil
3rd place, bronze medalist(s)		Gunther Matzinger	Austria

The T47 category is for athletes who have a single below elbow or wrist amputation or similar disability, with normal function in both legs.

The Athletics at the 2016 Summer Paralympics – Men's 400 metres T47 event at the 2016 Paralympic Games took place on 16–17 September 2016, at the Estádio Olímpico João Havelange.

== Heats ==
=== Heat 1 ===
10:30 16 September 2016:

Rank	Lane	Bib	Name	Nationality	Reaction	Time	Notes
1	5	1076	Gunther Matzinger	Austria		49.90	Q
2	2	2098	Hermas Muvunyi	Rwanda		49.99	Q
3	3	1360	Antonis Aresti	Cyprus		50.42	q
4	4	2013	Samuel Nason	Papua New Guinea		53.64	
5	8	2243	Romikhudo Dodikhudoev	Tajikistan		56.34	
6	7	2249	Antonio Mendonca	Timor-Leste		1:06.87	
	6	2357	Jaquvis Hart	United States			DSQ

=== Heat 2 ===
10:37 16 September 2016:

Rank	Lane	Bib	Name	Nationality	Reaction	Time	Notes
1	4	1145	Petrucio Ferreira dos Santos	Brazil		49.96	Q
2	8	1283	Kouame Jean-Luc Noumbo	Ivory Coast		50.14	Q
3	3	2406	Samuel Colmenares	Venezuela		50.22	q
4	6	1724	Bilal Saada	Jordan		50.42	
5	5	1349	Ettiam Calderon	Cuba		51.50	
6	7	1591	Mohamed Sanoussy Camara	Guinea		57.55	

=== Heat 3 ===
10:44 16 September 2016:

Rank	Lane	Bib	Name	Nationality	Reaction	Time	Notes
1	4	1718	Shane Hudson	Jamaica		49.53	Q
2	5	1348	Ernesto Blanco	Cuba		49.68	Q
3	8	2170	Alex Anjos	São Tomé and Príncipe		50.94	
4	2	1259	Hao Wang	China		52.29	
5	7	2316	David Emong	Uganda		58.30	
	6	1150	Yohansson Nascimento	Brazil			DSQ
	3	1910	Elias Ndimulunde	Namibia			DSQ

== Final ==
18:05 17 September 2016:

Rank	Lane	Bib	Name	Nationality	Reaction	Time	Notes
1st place, gold medalist(s)	4	1348	Ernesto Blanco	Cuba		48.79	
2nd place, silver medalist(s)	5	1145	Petrucio Ferreira dos Santos	Brazil		48.87	
3rd place, bronze medalist(s)	6	1076	Gunther Matzinger	Austria		48.95	
4	3	1718	Shane Hudson	Jamaica		49.07	
5	2	2406	Samuel Colmenares	Venezuela		49.55	
6	1	1360	Antonis Aresti	Cyprus		50.07	
	8	2098	Hermas Muvunyi	Rwanda			DSQ
	7	1283	Kouame Jean-Luc Noumbo	Ivory Coast			DSQ
