= Washington Junior =

Brazilian para-athlete

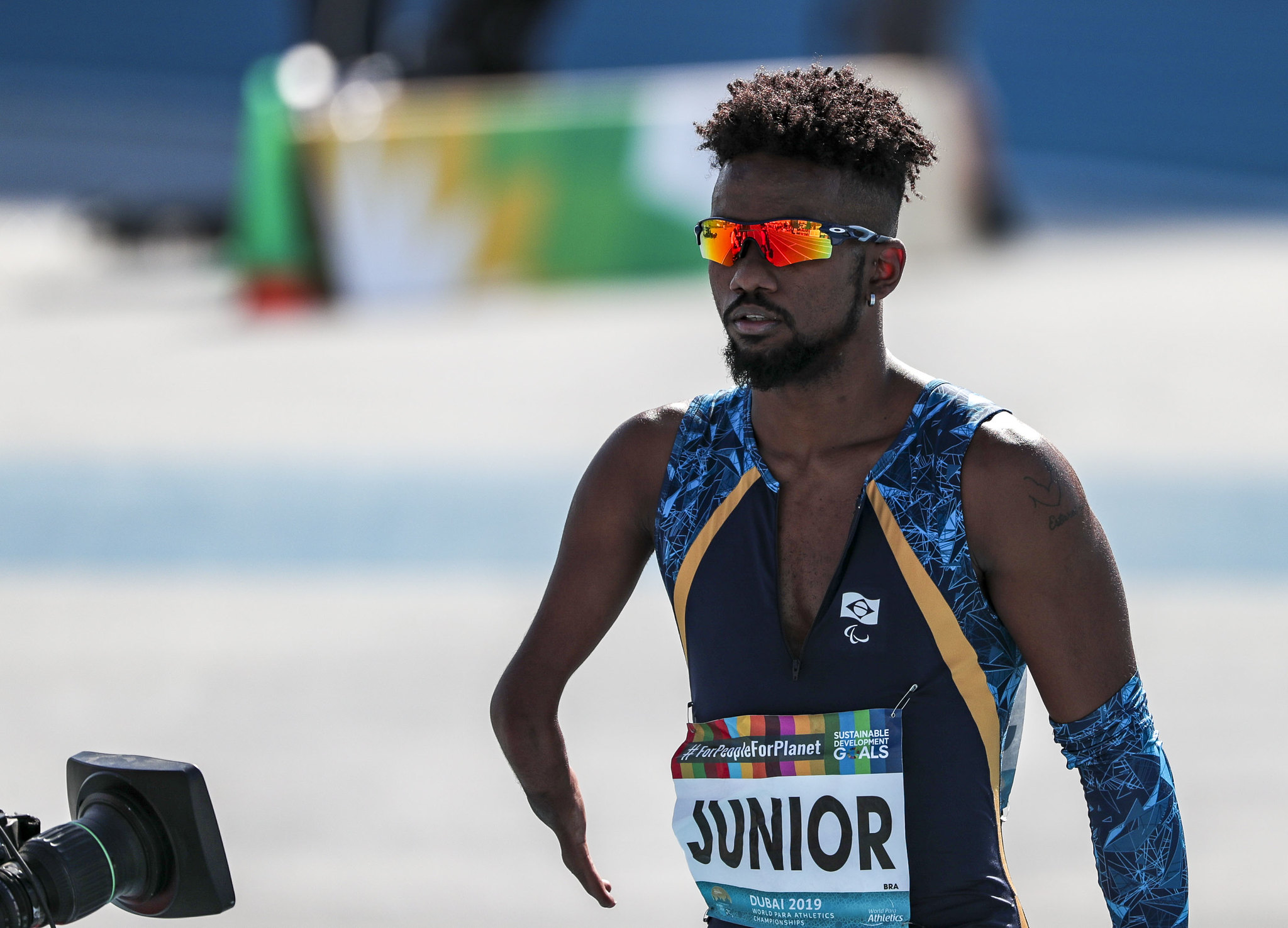
- Junior in 2019

Personal information
- Full name: Washington Assis do Nascimento Junior
- Born: 20 December 1996 (age 29) Rio de Janeiro, Brazil
Medal record
Para-athletics
Representing Brazil
Paralympic Games
Bronze medal – third place	2020 Tokyo	100 m T47
Parapan American Games
Silver medal – second place	2023 Santiago	100 m T47

Washington Assis do Nascimento Junior (born 20 December 1996 in Rio de Janeiro) is a Brazilian Paralympic sprinter. He won bronze in the 100m T47 in 2020.
