= Raciel González =

Cuban Paralympic athlete (born 1991)

Raciel González Isidoría
Personal information
- Born: 31 March 1991 (age 35)
- Height: 185 cm (73 in)

Sport
- Country: Cuba
- Sport: Athletics
- Disability class: T46
- Event: sprint
- Coached by: Miriam Ferrer
Medal record
Track and field
Representing Cuba
Paralympic Games
Silver medal – second place	2012 London	200m - T46
Silver medal – second place	2012 London	200m - T46
IPC World Championships
Bronze medal – third place	2013 Lyon	200m - T46
Parapan American Games
Silver medal – second place	2011 Guadalajara	100m - T46

Raciel González Isidoría (born 31 March 1991) is a Paralympian athlete from Cuba competing mainly in T46 classification sprint events.

== Athletics career ==
González first represented Cuba at a major international competition in 2011 when he travelled to Guadalajara to compete in the Parapan American Games. He competed in the 100 metre sprint, winning a silver medal. The next year Gonzalez Isidoria represented his country at the 2012 Summer Paralympics in London, where he competed at two events, the 100 and 200 metre sprints. He managed to make the finals of both races, finishing in silver medal position in both. As well as the Paralympics, Gonzalez Isidoria has represented his country at two World Championships, at Lyon in 2013 and Doha in 2015. In Lyon he won a bronze medal in the 200 metres sprint. He failed to medal at Doha, but as his classification was not represented in the sprints he was forced to compete at the T47 events, for athlete with a less severe impairment than his own.

== Personal history ==
González was born in Cuba in 1985.
