= Farhan Hadafo =

Somalian-Italian para-athlete (born 1990s)

Personal information
- Born: 1996 or 1997 (age 28–29) Somalia
- Weight: 40 kg (88 lb)

Sport
- Country: Somalia
- Sport: Sprinting
- Disability class: T52
- Event: 100 metres

Farhan Hadafo Adawe (born 1996 or 1997) is a Somali-Italian para-athlete. He competed at the 2016 Summer Paralympics, becoming Somalia's first athlete at the Paralympics.

== Biography ==
Hadafo was born in 1996 or 1997 in Somalia, the son of a mechanic. He was born with arthrogryposis, a condition causing contractures and joint stiffness. He lived in Somalia for six years, but his condition caused him significant pain, paralysis, and restricted him in daily activities. Due to the poor state of the health system in Somalia, he was sent at age six to live with his aunts in Italy and receive operations to improve his condition. After successful surgeries, his pains went away and he became more active, although he still needed to use a wheelchair.

Living in Turin, Hadafo became enthusiastic about sports as he grew up, particularly liking para-athletics. His best events were the 100 and 200 metres; due to his condition, he competes in the disability class T52. In eighth grade, Hadafo won a school tournament in the 80-meter dash. After watching the 2012 Summer Paralympics, he made it his goal to become a Paralympian. A few years later, he set an Italian national record in the T52 100 metres with a time of 18.83 seconds, sufficient to qualify for the 2016 Summer Paralympics in Rio de Janeiro. The month prior to the Olympics, he and friends raised enough money to provide him with a custom-made racing wheelchair for the Paralympics.

At the Paralympics, Hadafo represented Somalia, as he did not yet have Italian citizenship. He became Somalia's first Paralympian. Competing in the T52 100 metres, he recorded a time of 18.49 seconds, which set an African record but was not sufficient to advance from his heat. He was named the recipient of the International Somali Award Sportsman of the Year in 2017 for "his professionalism and talent that inspires many other young Somalis to achieve their goals". However, due to visa issues, he was unable to attend the ceremony for the award in London. In 2018, he won the bronze medal in the 100m at the World Para Athletics European Championships. By 2020, he had become an Italian citizen.
