= São Tomé and Príncipe at the 2020 Summer Paralympics =

- IPC code: STP
- NPC: São Tomé and Príncipe National Paralympic Committee

in Tokyo
- Competitors: 1 in 1 sport
- Medals: Gold - Silver - Bronze - Total

Summer appearances
- 2016 • 2020

São Tomé and Príncipe will be competing at the 2020 Summer Paralympics in Tokyo, Japan, from 24 August to 5 September 2021.

== Athletics ==
Track

Athlete	Event	Heats		Final	
Athlete	Event	Result	Rank	Result	Rank
Alex Anjos	Men's 400 m T47	54.24	7	did not advance	

== See also ==
- São Tomé and Príncipe at the 2020 Summer Olympics
