= Gabriel Cole (athlete) =

Australian Paralympic athlete

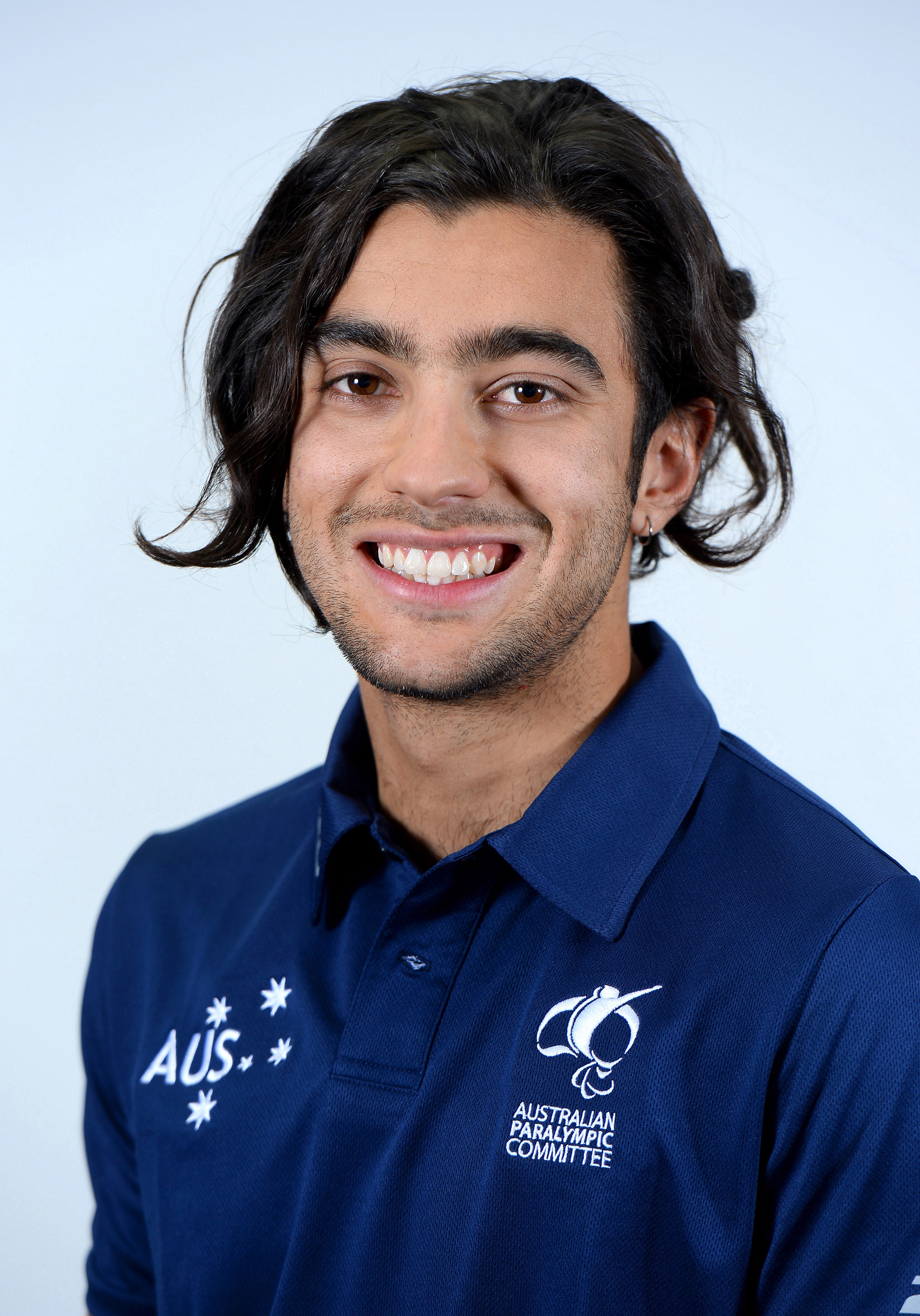
- 2016 Australian Paralympic team portrait of Cole

Personal information
- Nationality: Australian
- Born: 15 January 1992 (age 34) Malvern, South Australia

Sport
- Country: Australia
- Sport: Athletics
- College team: DC
Medal record
Track and field (T46)
Representing Australia
IPC Athletics World Championships
Silver medal – second place	2013 Lyon	Men's 100 m T46

Gabriel Cole (born 15 January 1992) who has a partially formed left arm, is an Australian Paralympic athletics competitor. He competed at the 2010 Commonwealth Games and the 2012 Summer Paralympics in athletics. He represented Australia at the 2016 Rio Paralympics.

== Personal ==
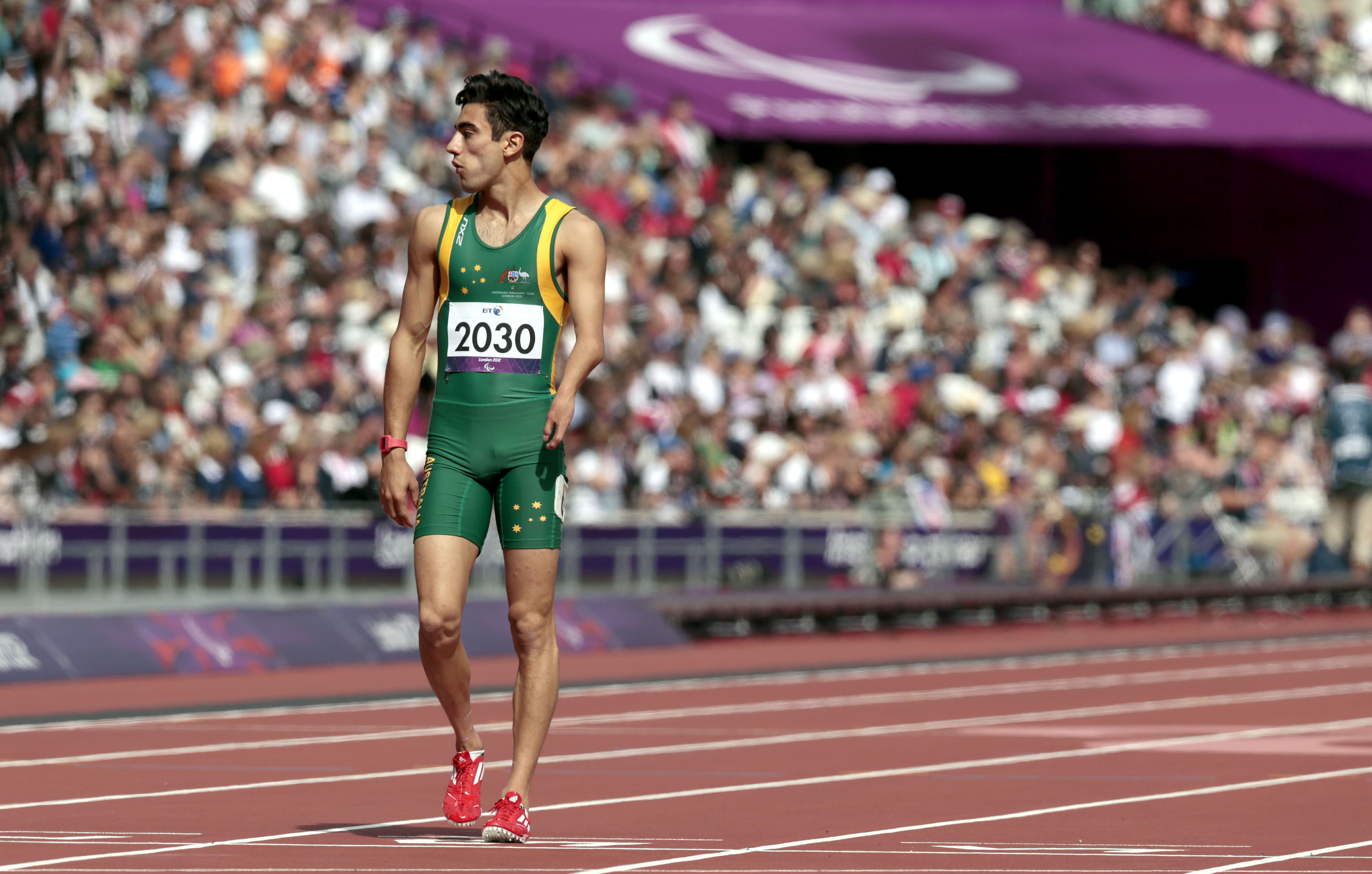
Cole at the 2012 London Paralympics

Cole was born on 15 January 1992 in Malvern, South Australia, "with a partially formed left arm". He attended Mercedes College and was in year 12 in 2010. Sports he played in his youth, before he took up athletics, included cycling, surfing, soccer and skate boarding. As of June 2012, he was attending university and working on a course in architecture.

== Athletics ==
Cole competes in the T46 classification.

In June 2012, his personal best time in the 100 metres was 11.13sec, half a second off world record time. He ran as a hobby, but took up the sport seriously in 2008 after his high school French teacher, Ellen Bailey, helped bring a talent scout to the school to watch him run. In 2009, he had the fastest time in the T46 under-20 for the 100 metres. He was running times in the 12 second range.

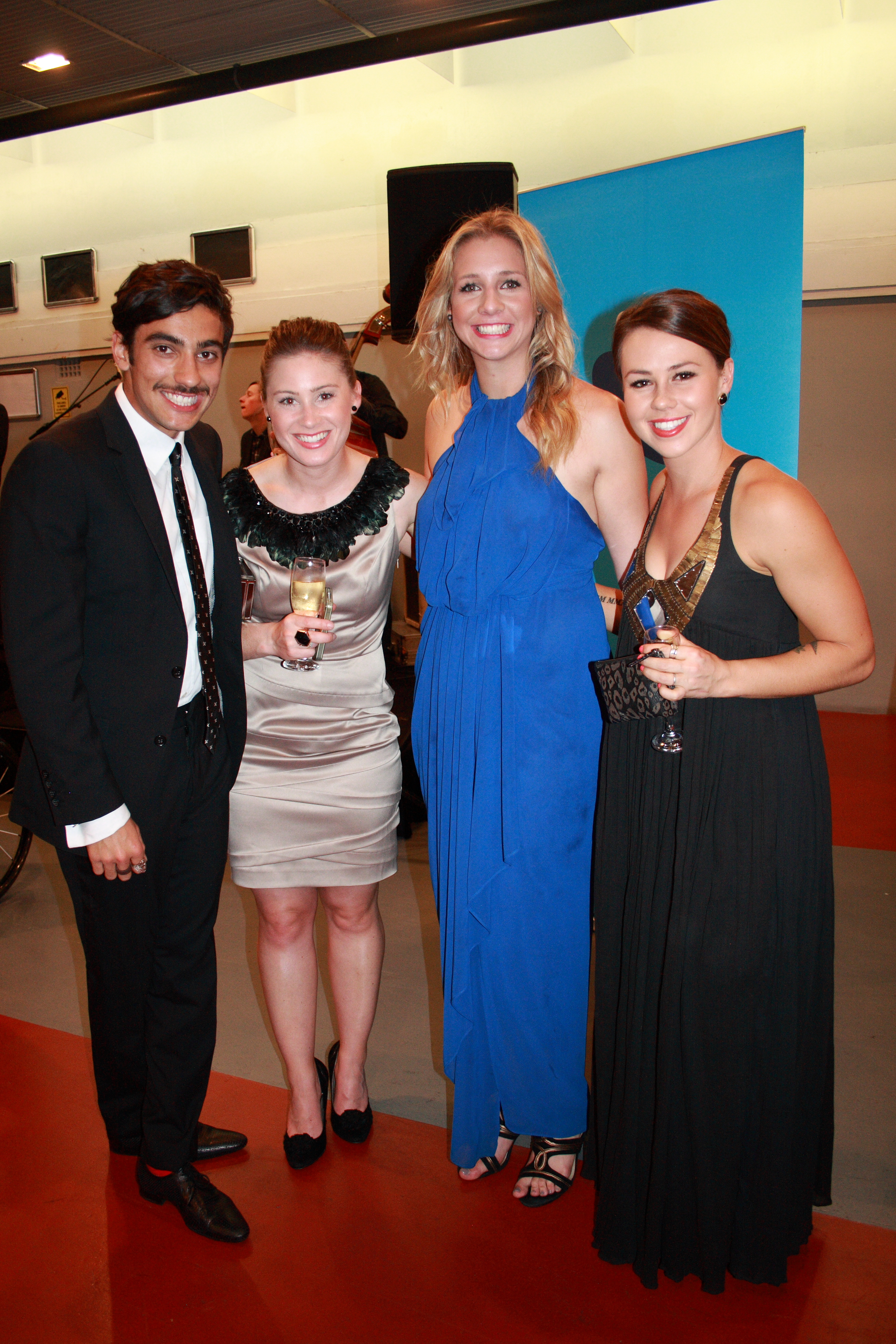
Cole with athletics teammates at the 2012 Australian Paralympian of the Year ceremony

At the 2010 National Championships in March, Cole finished third in the 100 metres event with a time of 11.49 seconds. He competed at the 2010 Commonwealth Games in the 100 metres event, where he was one of only two South Australian competitors with a disability at the Games. He had a torn hamstring but still managed to make the finals for the 100 metres event. Going into the Commonwealth Games, he trained five days a week.

In 2011, he had an athletics scholarship with the South Australian Institute of Sport.

He finished first in his class in the 100 metres event at the 2012 Australian and German national championships. Cole competed at the 2012 Summer Paralympics in athletics in the 100 m T46 event but did not medal.

At the 2013 IPC Athletics World Championships in Lyon, France, he won a silver medal in the Men's 100 m T46 event. He came fifth in the 100m T47 at the 2015 IPC Athletics World Championships in Doha.

At the 2016 Rio Paralympics, he finished seventh in the Men's 100 m T47.
