= Petrúcio Ferreira =

Brazilian Paralympic sprinter

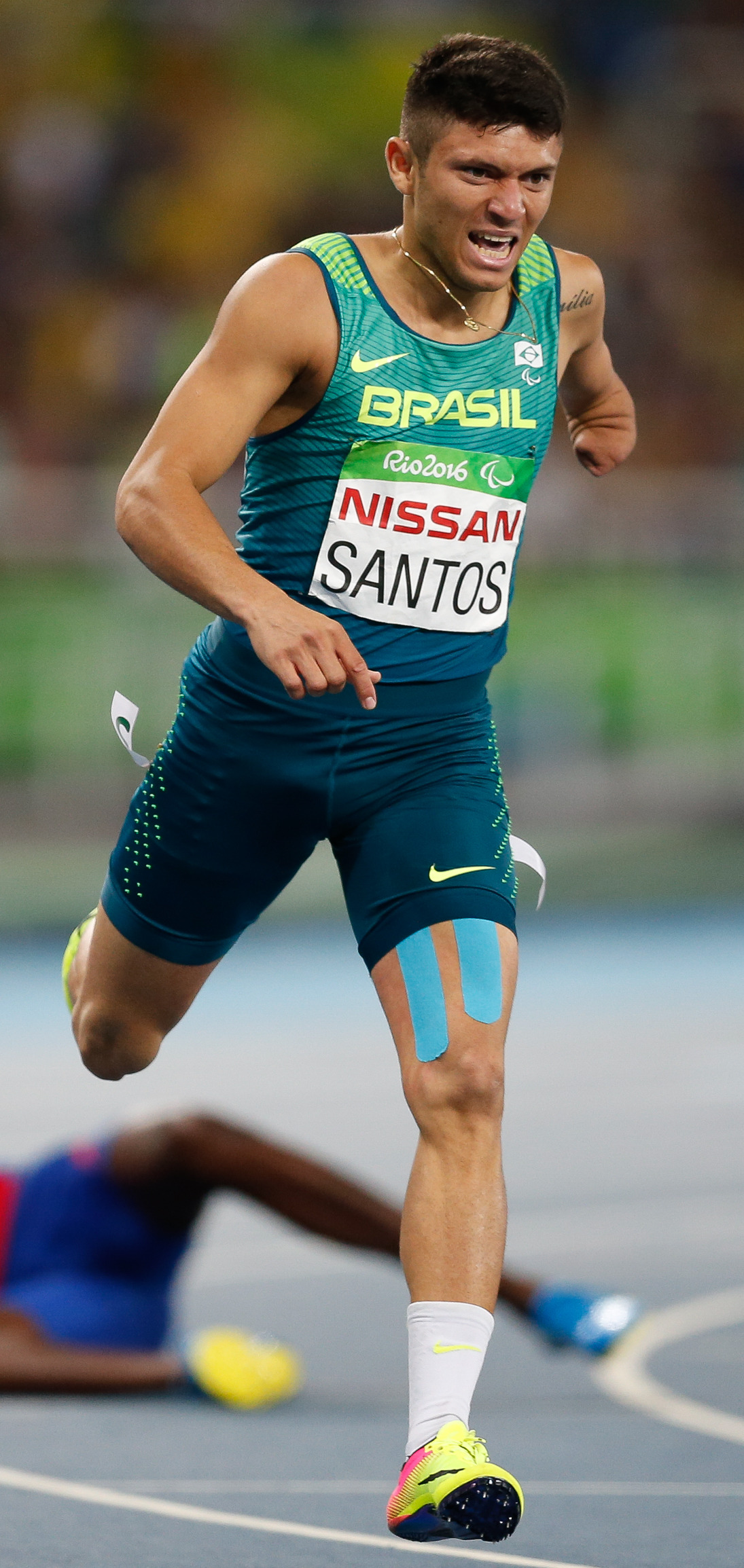
- Ferreira at the 2016 Paralympics

Personal information
- Full name: Petrúcio Ferreira dos Santos
- Born: 18 November 1996 (age 29)
- Height: 1.68 m (5 ft 6 in)

Sport
- Sport: Paralympic athletics
- Disability class: T45/46/47
- Event: Sprint
Medal record
Representing Brazil
Paralympic Games
Gold medal – first place	2016 Rio de Janeiro	100 m T45/46/47
Gold medal – first place	2020 Tokyo	100 m T47
Gold medal – first place	2024 Paris	100 m T47
Silver medal – second place	2016 Rio de Janeiro	400 m T45/46/47
Silver medal – second place	2016 Rio de Janeiro	4×100 m T42-47
World Championships
Gold medal – first place	2017 London	100 m T47
Gold medal – first place	2025 New Delhi	100 m T47
Parapan American Games
Gold medal – first place	2015 Toronto	100m T47
Gold medal – first place	2015 Toronto	200m T47
Gold medal – first place	2019 Lima	100m T47
Gold medal – first place	2019 Lima	400m T47
Gold medal – first place	2023 Santiago	100m T47

Petrúcio Ferreira dos Santos (born 18 November 1996) is a Paralympic sprinter from Brazil. He competed in three events at the 2016 Summer Paralympics and won a gold or a silver medal in each of them. In the individual 100 m sprint he broke the world record both in the preliminaries and in the final.
