= Kiribati at the 2024 Summer Paralympics =

- IPC code: KIR
- NPC: Kiribati National Paralympic Committee

in Paris, France 28 August 2024 – 8 September 2024
- Competitors: 1 (1 man) in 1 sport and 1 event
- Flag bearer: Ongiou Timeon
- Officials: 1
- Medals: Gold 0 Silver 0 Bronze 0 Total 0

Summer appearances
- 2024

Kiribati competed at the 2024 Summer Paralympics in Paris, France, which were held from 28 August to 8 September 2024. The country's participation in Paris marked its first appearance at a Paralympic Games after its withdrawal from the 2020 Summer Paralympics due to travel restrictions caused by the COVID-19 pandemic. The athlete delegation comprised one single athlete, thrower Ongiou Timeon, who competed in the men's shot put F11 event for athletes with near-total visual impairment. Timeon served as the nation's flagbearer during the opening ceremony.

The delegation was supported by a collaboration between the Australian Government and the Australian Olympic Committee, which was made for the development of sport in Pacific nations. Timeon qualified for the games after receiving a universality slot. He competed in his event on 2 September 2024 and placed eighth, not earning a medal.

== Background ==
The games were held from 28 August to 8 September 2024 in Paris, France. This edition of the games marked the nation's first appearance at the Paralympic Games alongside Eritrea and Kosovo. The Kiribati National Paralympic Committee was recognized by the International Paralympic Committee (IPC) in 2019 and initially planned to make their debut at the 2020 Summer Paralympics in Tokyo, Japan. Due to travel restrictions imposed by the COVID-19 pandemic, the I-Kiribati delegation had to stay in a hotel in Australia due to the latter nation requiring international travelers to quarantine for two weeks before further travel. The quarantine left some financial constraints for the delegation, and they eventually announced their withdrawal from the 2020 Summer Games.

In the lead-up to the games, the Australian Government announced a collaboration with the Australian Olympic Committee to assist over 230 athletes from 13 Pacific nations (Note: Among the nations that were supported for the games included Kiribati, Papua New Guinea, Tonga, and Vanuatu.) for the 2024 Summer Olympics and 2024 Summer Paralympics, which included Kiribati. The collaboration was made to create opportunities for said nations to compete in international competition, gain access to coaching, and to develop sports diplomacy.

=== Delegation and opening ceremony ===
The Kiribati delegation composed of three people. Their travel took two days, making a layover at Hong Kong before landing in Paris. The official present at the games was chef de mission Fakaofo Kekeang. A singular athlete qualified for the games, Ongiou Timeon, a thrower who competed in the men's shot put F11. Timeon was coached by Karotu Bakae who was also at the games. The nation's athlete delegation at the games tied with 36 other nations (Note: The nations were Afghanistan, Aruba, Barbados, Bhutan, Burkina Faso, Cambodia, East Timor, Eritrea, Haiti, Honduras, Jamaica, Kosovo, Laos, Lebanon, Macau, Mozambique, Myanmar, Nicaragua, Niger, North Macedonia, Pakistan, Palestine, Paraguay, Saint Vincent and the Grenadines, São Tomé and Príncipe, Sierra Leone, Somalia, Suriname, Syria, Tanzania, Togo, Tonga, Trinidad and Tobago, Turkmenistan, the United States Virgin Islands, and Yemen.) for the fewest athletes of a country at the games. The I-Kiribati delegation came in 81st out of the 169 National Olympic Committees in the 2024 Summer Paralympics Parade of Nations within the opening ceremony. Timeon held the flag for the delegation.

== Competitors ==
List of I-Kiribati competitors at the 2024 Summer Paralympics
Sport	Men	Women	Total
Athletics	1	0	1
Total	1	0	1

== Athletics ==
=== Qualification and lead-up to the games ===
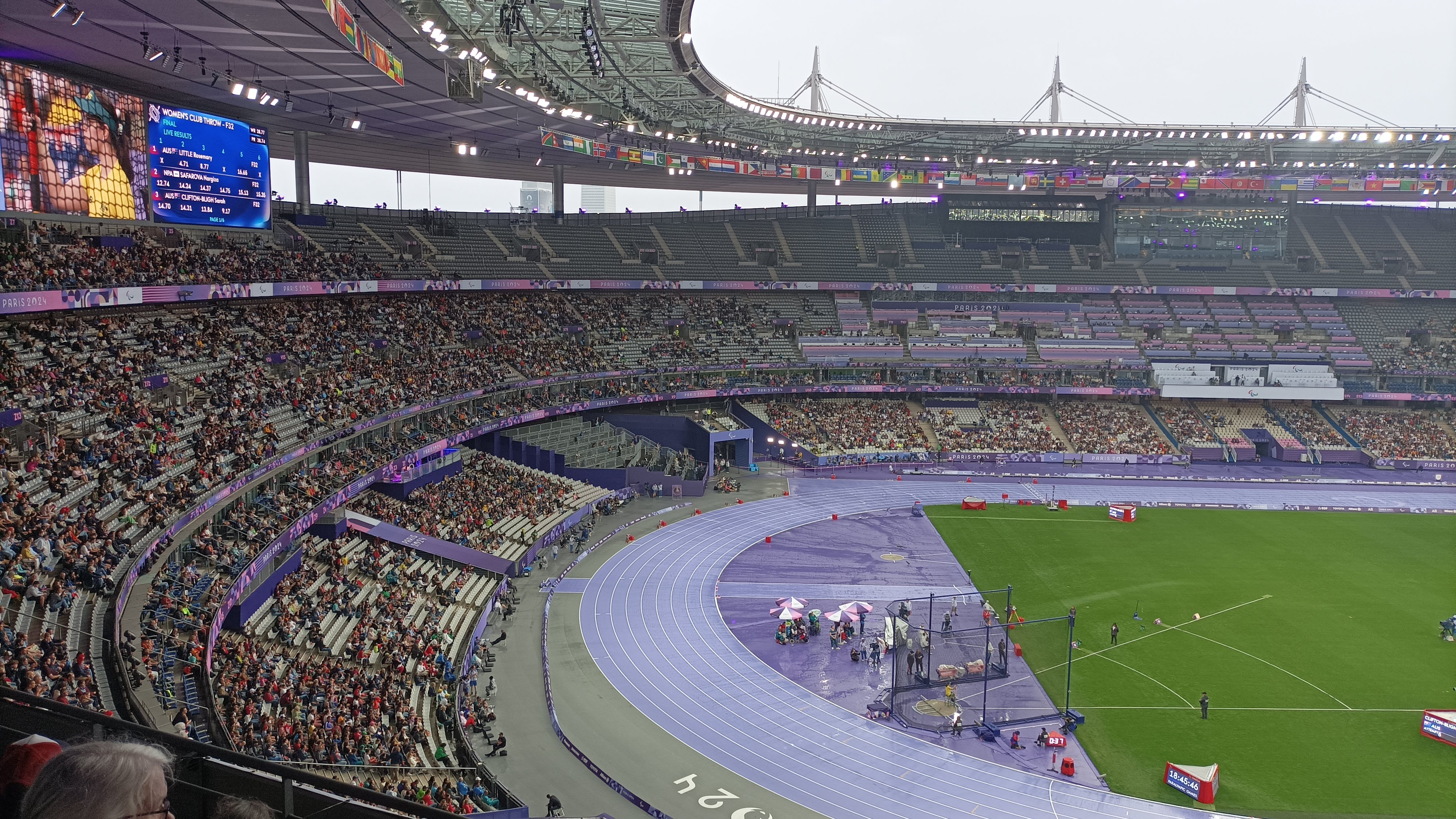
The Stade de France, where Timeon competed in his event

Kiribati was eligible for a universality slot to send an athletics competitor to the games, which allows a National Paralympic Committee to send athletes despite not meeting the standard qualification criteria. Kiribati sent thrower Ongiou Timeon, who would compete in the men's shot put F11 event for athletes with near-total visual impairment.

=== Event ===
The athletics events were held in the Stade de France. Timeon competed in the straight final of the event on 2 September 2024, which started on 8:46 p.m., where he was the second athlete to throw. His first throw was disqualified, whereas his second throw of 6.46 metres would be his best throw at the games. The rest of his throws were recorded as 6.20 metres, 6.17 metres, a disqualified throw, and 5.84 meters, ultimately placing him eighth out of the eight competitors. The eventual winner of the event was Amirhossein Alipour Darbeid of Iran with a throw of 14.78, which was an Asian record. During an interview with the IPC after his event, he commented "I tried my best. I can do better if I keep training well," and once asked if he would try to qualify for a future Olympic Games, he said he would continue to work hard. The eyemask that Timeon wore during the competition was applauded by the IPC, calling it "impressive".

Athlete	Event	Final	
Athlete	Event	Result	Rank
Ongiou Timeon	Men's shot put F11	6.46	8

== See also ==
- Kiribati at the 2024 Summer Olympics
- Kiribati at the Paralympics
