= Membership of Kosovo in international sports federations =

Kosovo was a part of several international sports federations in the 1990s, and has applied to become a member of many more after its 2008 declaration of independence from Serbia.

== Background ==
Kosovo is a full member of the International Olympic Committee (IOC) and the European Olympic Committees (EOC); membership by the former was granted to Kosovo's Olympic Committee on 9 December 2014. The country has participated in both the Winter and Summer Olympics. At the 2016 Summer Olympics in Rio de Janeiro, Brazil, Kosovo won a gold medal, and in the 2020 Summer Olympics in Tokyo, Japan, it won two.

Before IOC and IPC recognition, Kosovar athletes took part in the Special Olympics starting in 2003. A body known as Special Olympics Kosovo was established to provide support for Kosovan Special Olympics athletes. The Paralympic Committee of Kosovo won granted provisional membership status by the International Paralympic Committee on 16 July 2022. Full membership was granted at the following IPC General Assembly in Manama, Bahrain on 28 September 2023. Kosovo made its Paralympic début at 2024 Summer Paralympics.

Kosovo participated in a wide multi-sport event for the first time at the 2015 European Games held in Baku, Azerbaijan. The first participation from athletes from the country were at the fourth 'World Dwarf Games' in Rambouillet, France in 2005, Kosovo also participated at the 2015 World Aquatics Championships in Kazan, Russia, and in 2015 IHF Emerging Nations Championship, among others.

== Membership in sport federations ==
The following sports federations have either admitted or have received an application from Kosovo for membership:

=== International federations and associations membership ===
Entity	Notes	Status	Date
Fédération Aéronautique Internationale (FAI)	FAI admitted Kosovo as a full member.	Member	25 September 2015
Fédération Internationale de Football Association (FIFA)	FIFA admitted the Football Federation of Kosovo as its 210th member at its 66th Congress in Mexico City.	Member	13 May 2016
Fédération Internationale de l'Automobile (FIA)	FIA admitted the Federation of Auto Sport of Kosovo as a member at its annual assembly in 2015.	Member	4 December 2015
Fédération Internationale de Volleyball (FIVB)	The Volleyball Federation of Kosovo is a full member of the FIVB.	Member	10 October 2016
International Archery Federation (FITA)	FITA admitted Kosovo as a full member.	Member	1 July 2011
International Tennis Federation (ITF)	ITF admitted the Tennis Federation of Kosovo as a full member.	Member	25 September 2015
International Association of Athletics Federations (IAAF)	The IAAF admitted the Kosovo Athletic Federation as a provisional member "with full rights and obligations" on 15 April 2015 On 19 August 2015, full membership was granted to Kosovo after a vote, with 187 in favour and 13 against.	Member	19 August 2015
International Basketball Federation (FIBA)	FIBA admitted the Basketball Federation of Kosovo as a full member.	Member	13 March 2015
International Boxing Association (AIBA)	Kosovo became AIBA's 195th federation in July 2012 (provisional). Full membership was granted to Kosovo on 14 November 2014.	Member	14 November 2014
International Chess Federation (FIDE)	The Kosovo Chess Federation became a full member of FIDE in 2016.	Member	2016
International Committee of Mediterranean Games (ICMG)	ICMG admitted the Kosovo Olympic Committee as a full member on 30 October 2015 during its Extraordinary General Assembly in Washington D.C.	Member	30 October 2015
International Committee of Sports for the Deaf	Kosovo became a member in July 2017.	Member	18 July 2017
International Federation of Associated Wrestling Styles (FILA)	FILA admitted Kosovo as an associated federation, but not as a full member.	Associate	9 June 2008
International Federation of Gymnastics (FIG)	The FIG admitted the Kosovo Gymnastics Federation at its 80th Congress held in Uzbekistan on 29–30 October 2014.	Member	30 October 2014
International Handball Federation (IHF)	IHM admitted the Handball Federation of Kosovo as a full member at the IHF Congress held in Sochi, Russia.	Member	7 November 2015
International Judo Federation (IJF)	IJF admitted the Kosovo Judo Federation as a full member.	Member	10 April 2012
International Kickboxing Federation (IKF)	IKF admitted the Kickboxing Federation of Kosovo as a full member.	Member	18 March 2015
International Mixed Martial Arts Federation (IMMAF)	The Kosovo Mixed Martial Federation became a member of the IMMAF in June 2020.	Member	12 June 2020
International Modern Pentathlon Union (UIPM)	The UIPM admitted the Kosovo Pentathlon Union as a full member at its 2013 Annual Congress in Cyprus.	Member	29 November 2013
International Olympic Committee (IOC)	The IOC admitted the Kosovo Olympic Committee as a full member on 9 December 2014 during its 127th IOC session in Monaco.	Member	9 December 2014
International Paralympic Committee (IPC)	The IPC admitted the Paralympic Committee of Kosovo as a provisional member on 16 July 2022 and as a full member on 28 September 2023 allowing athletes from Kosovo to participate in the Paralympic Games.	Member	16 July 2022 (provisional); 28 September 2023 (full)
International Sailing Federation (ISAF)	ISAF admitted Kosovo as a full member.	Member	8 May 2012
International Ski Federation (FIS)	The Kosovo Ski Federation was granted full membership on 7 November 2015.	Member	7 November 2015
International Softball Federation (ISF)	ISF admitted Kosovo as a full member.	Member	12 August 2008
International Swimming Federation (FINA)	FINA admitted the Kosovo Swimming Federation as a full member.	Member	17 February 2015
International Table Tennis Federation (ITTF)	The Table Tennis Federation of Kosovo became a full member in 2003, before it declared independence.	Member	21 May 2003
International University Sports Federation (FISU)	The Kosovo University Sports Federation (FUSK) became a member of FISU in 2017.	Member	2017
Jeux de la Francophonie	As an associate member of the Organisation internationale de la Francophonie, Kosovo has participated in the Jeux de la Francophonie since 2017	Associate	2014
Special Olympics	Special Olympics Kosovo was founded in 2002, and athletes representing Kosovo have participated at the Special Olympics World Games since 2003.	Member	2002
International Weightlifting Federation (IWF)	IWF admitted Kosovo as a full member.	Member	18 June 2008
Union Cycliste Internationale (UCI)	The UCI admitted Kosovo as a full member. Before this, the ICU gave Kosovo temporary membership in February 2015 enabling Kosovo to participate in ICU affiliated competitions.	Member	25 September 2015
United World Wrestling (UWW)	The UWW admitted Kosovo under associate membership on 16 January 2015, with full membership yet to be finalised.	Associate	16 January 2015
World Baseball Softball Confederation (WBSC)	The Kosovo Baseball and Softball Federation became a member of the WBSC in 2016.	Member	August 2016
World Curling Federation (WFC)	The WFC admitted the Kosovo Curling Federation as a provisional member at its 2012 annual general assembly in Scotland.	Provisional	21 October 2012
World Karate Federation (WKF)	The WKF admitted the National Karate Federation of Kosovo to provisional membership on 13 December 2014.	Provisional	13 December 2014
World Taekwondo Federation (WTF)	The WTF admitted the Kosovo Taekwondo Federation (KTF) at its 2013 Annual Congress. From 14 July 2013 to 12 May 2015 the KTF was a provisional member of WTF. The KTF was granted full WTF membership at the WTF assembly on 12 May 2015.	Member	12 May 2015
World Minigolf Sport Federation (WMF)	Kosovo is a full member of WMF.	Member	

=== European federations and associations membership ===
Entity	Notes	Status	Date
European Athletics Association (EAA)	Kosovo became a full member of the EAA on 16 October 2015.	Member	16 October 2015
European Handball Federation (EHF)	Kosovo became a full member of the EHF on 20 September 2014.	Member	20 September 2014
European Minigolf Sport Federation (EMF)	Kosovo became a member of the EMF in April 2012.	Member	20 April 2012
European Olympic Committees (EOC)	The EOI automatically admitted the Kosovo Olympic Committee as a full member after Kosovo received full membership in the International Olympic Committee on 9 December 2014.	Member	9 December 2014
European Paralympic Committee (EPC)	The Paralympic Committee of Kosovo became a member of the EPC when the International Paralympic Committee admitted Kosovo as a provisional member in July 2022 and a full member in September 2023.	Full	28 September 2023
Tennis Europe	Tennis Europe admitted Kosovo as a full member.	Member	28 March 2015
Union of European Football Associations (UEFA)	Kosovo became a full member of UEFA on 3 May 2016.	Member	3 May 2016
European Karate Federation (EFK)	Kosovo is a full member of EFK.	Member	25 October 2016
European Judo Union (EJU)	Kosovo is a full member of EJU.	Member	June 2012
European Pocket Billiard Federation (EPBF)	Kosovo is a provisional member of EPBF.	Provisional	
European Union of Gymnastics (EUG)	Kosovo is a full member of EUG.	Member	24 November 2015
European Volleyball Confederation (CEV)	Kosovo is a full member of CEV.	Member	21 January 2017
European Shooting Confederation (ESC)	Kosovo is a full member of ESC.	Member	
Ligue européenne de natation (LEN)	Kosovo is a full member of LEN.	Member	
European Chess Union (ECU)	Kosovo is a full member of ECU.	Member	
Rugby Europe	The Kosovo Rugby Federation became a member of Rugby Europe on 3 December 2021.	Member	3 December 2021

== See also ==
- List of national sports teams of Kosovo
- International recognition of Kosovo
- Membership of Kosovo in international organizations
- Kosovo precedent
