= Suriname at the Paralympics =

- IPC code: SUR
- NPC: National Paralympic Committee of Suriname
- Medals: Gold 0 Silver 0 Bronze 0 Total 0

Summer appearances
- 2004; 2008; 2012; 2016; 2020; 2024

Suriname made its Paralympic Games début at the 2004 Summer Paralympics in Athens, sending two athletes (a man and a woman) to compete in the shot put. The country had a single representative in 2008 - a male sprinter. Suriname has never taken part in the Winter Paralympics, and has never won a Paralympic medal.

== Full results for Suriname at the Paralympics ==
Name	Games	Sport	Event	Score	Rank
Andre Andrews	2004 Athens	Athletics	Men's Shot Put F58	5.25m	11th (last)
Melaica Tuinforth	2004 Athens	Athletics	Women's Shot Put F56-58	5.29m - 639 pts	17th (last)
Biondi Misasi	2008 Beijing	Athletics	Men's 100 m T13	11.87s	7th (last) in heat 2 did not advance
Biondi Misasi	2012 London	Athletics	Men's 100 m T13	11.92s	14th (out of 15) in heats did not advance
Biondi Misasi	2012 London	Athletics	Men's long jump F13	6.06 m	7th (out of 14)
Biondi Misasi	2016 Rio	Athletics	Men's 100 m T12	11.56s	3rd (out of 4) in heat 3 did not advance
Biondi Misasi	2016 Rio	Athletics	Men's long jump F12	6.25 m	12th (last)
Chivaro Belfort	2024 Paris	Athletics	Men's shot put F46	DNS	

== See also ==
- Suriname at the Olympics
