= Ongiou Timeon =

I-Kiribati shot putter (born 1989)

Personal information
- Nationality: I-Kiribati
- Born: 8 July 1989 (age 36)

Sport
- Country: Kiribati
- Sport: Athletics
- Disability class: F11
- Event: Shot put
- Coached by: Karotu Bakae

Achievements and titles
- Personal bests: Shot put: 6.90 m; Discus throw: 21.58 m

Ongiou Timeon (born 8 July 1989) is an I-Kiribati para athlete who competes in the F11 category for the shot put and discus throw. He is the first athlete to represent Kiribati at the Paralympics, after the nation made its debut at the 2024 Summer Paralympics and was named Kiribati's flagbearer for the games. Outside of competition, he delivers workshops about human rights.

== Biography ==
Ongiou Timeon was born on 8 July 1989. He is blind. Timeon started training for shot put at 27 years old, (Note: A feature article made by the International Paralympic Committee states that he started the sport at 27 years of age, whilst an article made by PacificAus Sports says 30 years of age.) where he initially struggled at training. Shot puts at the right weight or the shot puts themselves were also not readily available in the nation.

In 2020, Timeon, his teammate Karea Tioti, and his coach Karotu Bakae traveled to Queensland between February and March to determine his disability sport classification. They tried to secure berths to represent the nation at the then-upcoming 2020 Summer Paralympics in Tokyo, Japan, with the nation just being recognized by the International Paralympic Committee (IPC) a year prior. Both teammates competed in the 2020 Queensland Athletics Championships to represent Kiribati in both the discus and shot put on March 8. In the shot put open ambulant event, Timeon set a personal best of 6.90 metres on his first throw, placing 13th overall. He set another personal best after setting a mark of 21.58 metres in the discus throw open ambulant event at his third attempt, winning the silver medal in his category. These marks made him rank 15th and 13th in the world in the F11 classification (for athletes with near-total visual impairment) in 2020 for the respective events.

After the championships, the three planned to go back to Kiribati via Fiji Airways though the Kiribati Government announced a requirement for travelers returning to the nation from Australia to quarantine for two weeks because of restrictions imposed by the COVID-19 pandemic. They left Australia on March 6 and traveled to Fiji, where they were helped by the Oceania Paralympic Committee and provided accommodation in one room by the Fiji Association of Sports and National Olympic Committee in Suva for their quarantine. After the two weeks, Fiji Airways suddenly announced that international flights would be shut down until further notice on March 23, thus making their stay longer in the city. Support by the Oceania Paralympic Committee was halted in April after the Kiribati Government, through its embassy located in Fiji, announced that they would assist the three instead. After nine months in Suva, they were finally allowed to return to Kiribati.

The 2020 Summer Paralympics were then rescheduled the following year, where both Timeon and Tioti were set to compete for the nation, which would be the first iteration of the Paralympics where Kiribati would be competing. Due to travel restrictions imposed by the COVID-19 pandemic, the I-Kiribati delegation had to stay in a hotel in Australia due to the latter nation requiring international travelers to quarantine for two weeks before further travel. The quarantine left some financial constraints for the delegation, with them eventually announcing their withdrawal from the 2020 Summer Games.

On 3 March 2024, Timeon competed in the shot put at the Joanna Stone Shield which was part of the 2023–2024 Queensland Athletics Shield Series. He placed ninth overall with a distance of 5.10 metres. The same year, the nation was set to compete at the 2024 Summer Paralympics to make their Paralympic debut. They were assisted by a collaboration between the Australian Government and Australian Olympic Committee, which was made for the development of sport in Pacific nations. Timeon was part of the delegation, with his coach and chef de mission Fakaofo Kekeang accompanying him to Paris. During the Parade of Nations within the opening ceremony, Timeon held the flag for the nation. He competed in the men's shot put F11 event on 2 September, threw his farthest throw of 6.46 metres on his first attempt and placed eighth overall. After he competed, he became the first athlete to represent Kiribati at the Paralympics after its withdrawal from the preceding games. During an interview with the IPC after his event, he commented "I tried my best. I can do better if I keep training well," additionally hinting his participation at a future Paralympics if he worked harder.

Outside of sport, he travels around Kiribati to host workshops on human rights and works with Te Toa Matoa, an advocacy group for the welfare of disabled persons within the nation.
