= Disability in the Solomon Islands =

Disability in the Solomon Islands refers to the people with disability in the Solomon Islands.

== History ==
On 17 November 2022, the Government of the Solomon Islands officially approved the National Disability Inclusive Development Policy. It went into effect on 2 December 2022.

== Statistics ==
Currently there are around 14% of Solomon Islands' population with various degrees of disability.

== See also ==
- Solomon Islands at the Paralympics
