= Yemen at the Paralympics =

- IPC code: YEM
- Medals: Gold 0 Silver 0 Bronze 0 Total 0

Summer appearances
- 1992; 1996–2016; 2020; 2024

Yemen made its Paralympic Games debut at the 1992 Summer Paralympics in Barcelona, with a three-man delegation. A.M. Al-Hamdany competed in the marathon (TW3-4 category), along with Said Al-Huribi, who also competed in the 50m freestyle (S6). Shaif Al-Kawlany was scheduled to enter two events in table tennis, but was a non-starter in both. None of the three men won a medal.

Torn by conflict, Yemen had not returned to the Paralympics after 1992 until 2020.

In Tokyo, Yemen was represented by two shot putters, Naseb Fateh Mohammed Alraoad and Belqes Ahmed Hezam Taresh, with Taresh being the only female athlete to represent Yemen at the Paralympics. Alraoad would go on to compete for Yemen again in 2024.

== Medals ==
=== Medals by Summer Games ===
Games	Athletes	Gold	Silver	Bronze	Total	Rank
(Spain) Barcelona 1992	2	0	0	0	0	-
(United States) Atlanta 1996	did not participate					
(Australia) Sydney 2000	did not participate					
(Greece) Athens 2004	did not participate					
(China) Beijing 2008	did not participate					
(United Kingdom) London 2012	did not participate					
(Brazil) Rio de Janeiro 2016	did not participate					
(Japan) Tokyo 2020	2	0	0	0	0	-
(France) Paris 2024	1	0	0	0	0	-
Total		0	0	0	0	-

== Full results for Yemen at the Paralympics ==
Name	Games	Sport	Event	Score	Rank
A.M. Al-Hamdany	1992 Barcelona	Athletics	Men's Marathon TW3-4	DNF	unranked
Said Al-Huribi	1992 Barcelona	Athletics	Men's Marathon TW3-4	DNF	unranked
Said Al-Huribi	1992 Barcelona	Swimming	Men's 50m freestyle S6	57.08	6th in heat 2 (out of 7) did not advance
Shaif Al-Kawlany	1992 Barcelona	Table tennis	Men's Open 1-5	DNS	unranked
Shaif Al-Kawlany	1992 Barcelona	Table tennis	Men's Singles 1	DNS	unknown
Naseb Fateh Mohammed Al-raoad	2020 Tokyo	Athletics	Men's Shot put F57	6.88m	14th place
Belqes Ahmed Hezam Taresh	2020 Tokyo	Athletics	Women's Shot put F57	4.84m	18th place
Naseb Fateh Mohammed Al-raoad	2024 Paris	Athletics	Men's Shot put F57	7.02m	10th place

== See also ==
- Yemen at the Olympics
- Yemen at the Asian Para Games
