= Grenada at the Paralympics =

- IPC code: GRN
- NPC: Grenada Paralympic Committee
- Medals: Gold 0 Silver 0 Bronze 0 Total 0

Summer appearances
- 1960; 1964; 1968; 1972; 1976; 1980; 1984; 1988; 1992; 1996; 2000; 2004; 2008; 2012; 2016; 2020; 2024

Grenada made its Paralympic Games début at the 2020 Summer Paralympics in Tokyo, Japan, from 24 August to 5 September 2021. The country had two female athletes in 2020.

For the 2024 Summer Paralympics, Grenada sent 2 competitors once again, one male and one female athletes.

== See also ==
- Grenada at the Olympics
