= Sophie Sorschag =

Austrian ski jumper competing for Kosovo (born 1998)

Personal information
- Nationality: Austria (until 2022); Kosovo (since 2023)
- Born: 14 November 1998 (age 27) Villach, Austria
- Height: 1.71 m (5 ft 7 in)

Sport
- Sport: Skiing
- Club: SV Villach

World Cup career
- Seasons: 2020–present
- Indiv. starts: 11
Medal record
World Championships
| Gold medal – first place | 2021 Oberstdorf | Team NH |
- Updated on 19 January 2023

Sophie Sorschag (born 14 November 1998) is an Austrian-born naturalized Kosovan ski jumper.

== Career ==
Sorschag played football in her youth and was a midfielder for SK Grafendorf/Obergailtal, before she switched to the ski jumpers. On 7 and 8 August 2016, she started for the first time in two competitions in Klingenthal in the Alpen Cup, where she finished 33rd and 29th. As a result, she started more times at Alpen Cups in Germany, Austria and Slovenia. On 24 and 25 February 2018, she also competed in the FIS Cup for the first time in Villach, where she finished 29th and 28th. On 19 and 20 January 2019, Sorschag made her debut in the Continental Cup in Planica, where she achieved a podium finish and Continental Cup points with a third and seventh place. In the end, she finished the season in eleventh place overall and sixth in the winter rankings.

In 2021, together with Daniela Iraschko-Stolz, Chiara Hölzl and Marita Kramer, she won the gold medal in the team race on the normal hill at the World Championships in Oberstdorf.

On 8 November 2022, Sorschag announced that she would no longer represent Austria because she had been excluded from the Austrian Ski Association in the summer. The Austrian Ski Association contradicted this saying Sorschag herself had submitted an application for a change of nation. On 19 January 2023, The Kosovo Ski Federation announced that Sorschag had decided to represent their country. Six days later, she signed the contract enabling her to represent Kosovo. On 3 April 2023, The Kosovo Olympic Committee announced that she had received Kosovo citizenship and is ready for the 2026 Winter Olympics.
