= Haiti at the 2008 Summer Paralympics =

- IPC code: HAI
- NPC: Comité National Paralympique d'Haïti

in Beijing
- Competitors: 1 in 1 sport
- Flag bearer: Nephtalie Jean-Louis
- Medals: Gold 0 Silver 0 Bronze 0 Total 0

Summer Paralympics appearances (overview)
- 2008; 2012; 2016; 2020; 2024

Haiti sent a delegation to compete at the 2008 Summer Paralympics in Beijing, China. It was Haiti's first participation in the Paralympic Games. The country was represented by a single athlete, Nephtalie Jean-Louis, who competed in powerlifting. Jean-Louis was her country's flagbearer at the Games' Opening Ceremony.

Due to unspecified "problems with her weight", Jean-Louis was ultimately unable to compete, and was thus listed as a non-starter in her event.

== Powerlifting ==
Women

Athlete	Class	Event	Result	Rank
Nephtalie Jean-Louis	-	-44 kg	Did not start	

== See also ==
- Haiti at the Paralympics
- Haiti at the 2008 Summer Olympics
