= Solomon Islands at the 2012 Summer Paralympics =

- Flag of the Solomon Islands
- IPC code: SOL
- NPC: Solomon Islands Paralympics Committee

in London
- Competitors: 1 in 1 sport
- Flag bearer: Hellen Saohaga
- Officials: 3
- Medals: Gold 0 Silver 0 Bronze 0 Total 0

Summer Paralympics appearances (overview)
- 2012; 2016; 2020; 2024

An interview with Hellen Saohaga and her coach in London

The Solomon Islands made their Paralympic Games début at the 2012 Summer Paralympics in London, United Kingdom, from August 29 to September 9, 2012. The country sent one athlete, shot putter Hellen Saohaga. She finished 15th out of 19 competitors, and did not medal at these Games.

== Background ==
The Solomon Islands Paralympics Federation was recognised as a full member of the International Paralympic Committee in 2011, granting the country the right to send a delegation to the London Games. The Solomons initially planned to send athletes to compete in track and field and powerlifting events. Among the country's hopefuls were Benjamin Vae in the shot put, who was internationally classified, which was a requirement to compete at the Paralympics.

Ultimately, the country's delegation was composed of a single athlete, Hellen Saohaga (also known as Hellen Tasaunga). She was accompanied by Chef de Mission Casper Pule, team manager Falai Katalake Bare, and coach Fa'amoana Topue. She competed in Brisbane in an international competition during the Queensland Athletic Championships. She was given a universality spot in the Games. She was the country's flag-bearer during the Games' opening ceremony.

== Athletics ==
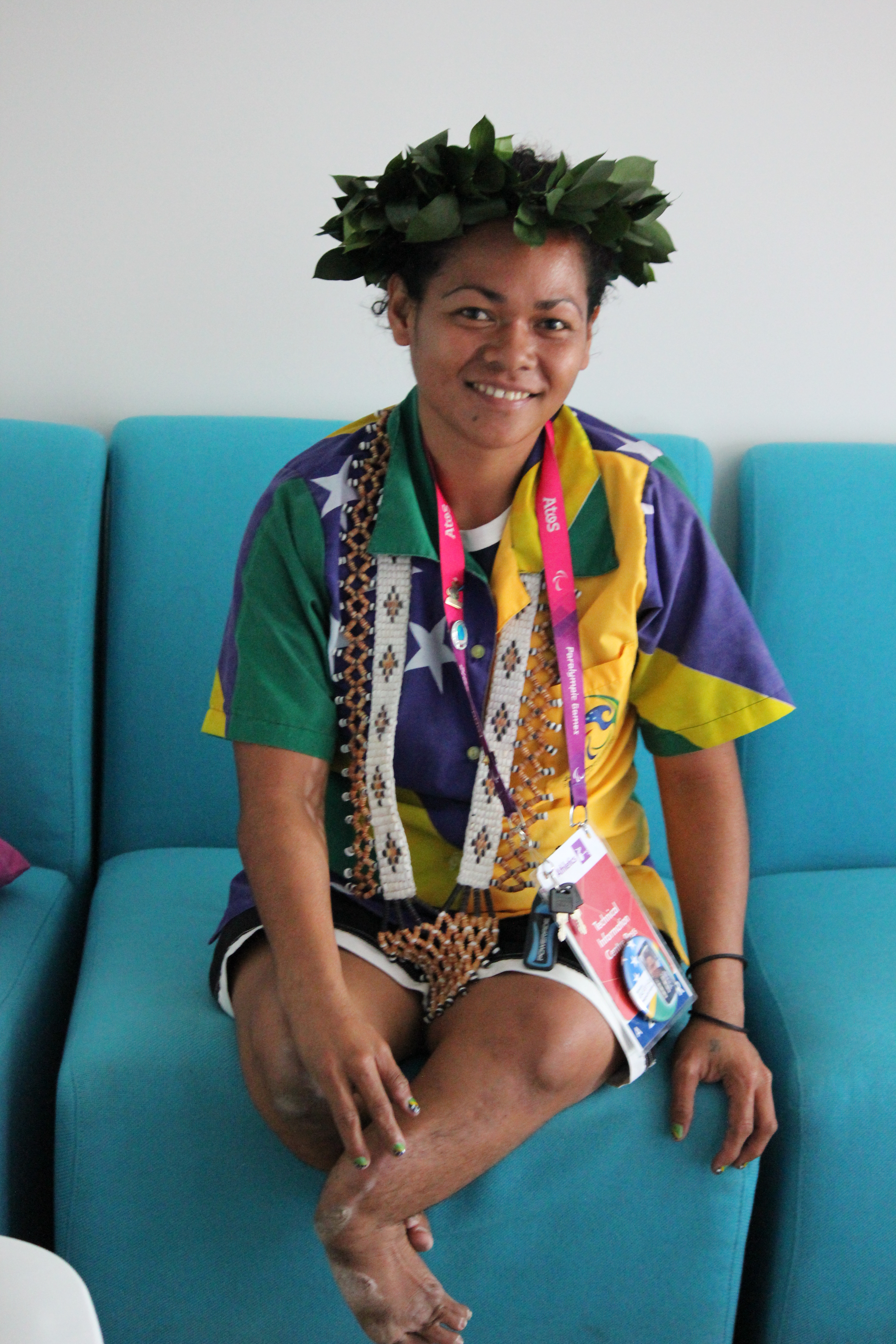
Hellen Saohaga

Hellen Saohaga, born with malformed legs, competed in the women's shot put, F57 category (for wheelchair athletes). Saohaga had never owned a seated throwing frame, and arrived at the Games without one, assuming the organizers would provide one. Once the Australian Paralympic Committee became aware of the situation, they had one specifically made for her before her event. Of the 19 competitors, Saohaga placed 15th with 298 points.

Athlete	Events	Result	Points	Rank
Hellen Saohaga	Shot put F57–58	5.23	298	15

== See also ==
- Summer Paralympic disability classification
- Solomon Islands at the Paralympics
- Solomon Islands at the 2012 Summer Olympics
