= Kiribati National Paralympic Committee =

National Paralympic Committee of Kiribati

National Paralympic Committee
- Country: Kiribati
- Code: KIR
- Continental association: OPC
- Headquarters: South Tarawa, Kiribati
- President: Tekoaua Tamaroa

The Kiribati National Paralympic Committee is the National Paralympic Committee representing Kiribati. The organization became full members of the International Paralympic Committee in October 2019. Kiribati intended to make their debut at the Summer Paralympics in the 2020 edition in Tokyo, but withdrew due to travel restrictions caused by the COVID-19 pandemic. Kiribati debuted at the 2024 Summer Paralympics in Paris.

== See also ==
- Kiribati at the Paralympics
- Kiribati National Olympic Committee
