= Haiti at the Paralympics =

- IPC code: HAI
- NPC: Comité National Paralympique d'Haïti
- Medals: Gold 0 Silver 0 Bronze 0 Total 0

Summer appearances
- 2008; 2012; 2016; 2020; 2024

Haiti first participated in the Paralympic Games in 2008, sending a single athlete, Nephtalie Jean-Louis, to compete in powerlifting. Due to unspecified "problems with her weight", however, Jean-Louis was ultimately unable to compete and was listed as a non-starter in her event.

Thus, it was only at the 2012 Summer Paralympics in London that Haitian athletes competed for the first time. The country was represented by two athletes: Nephtalie Jean-Louis, in the shot put and javelin rather than in powerlifting; and Josue Cajuste, also in the shot put and javelin.

Haiti will make its Winter Paralympic debut at the 2026 games in Milan and Cortina, Italy, with para alpine skiing athlete Ralf Etienne qualifying for the Men's Giant Slalom Standing competition.

Haiti's participation in the Paralympics is overseen by the Comité National Paralympique d'Haïti.

== Full results for Haiti at the Paralympics ==
Name	Games	Sport	Event	Score	Rank
Nephtalie Jean-Louis	2008 Beijing	Powerlifting	Women's -44kg	Did not start	-
Josué Cajuste	2012 London	Athletics	Men's shot put F42-44	7.63m (238 pts)	11
Josue Cajuste	2012 London	Athletics	Men's javelin F42		
Nephtalie Jean-Louis	2012 London	Athletics	Shot Put F57-58		
Nephtalie Jean-Louis	2012 London	Athletics	Women's javelin F57-58		

== See also ==
- Haiti at the Olympics
