= Hellen Saohaga =

Solomon Islander athlete (born 1987)

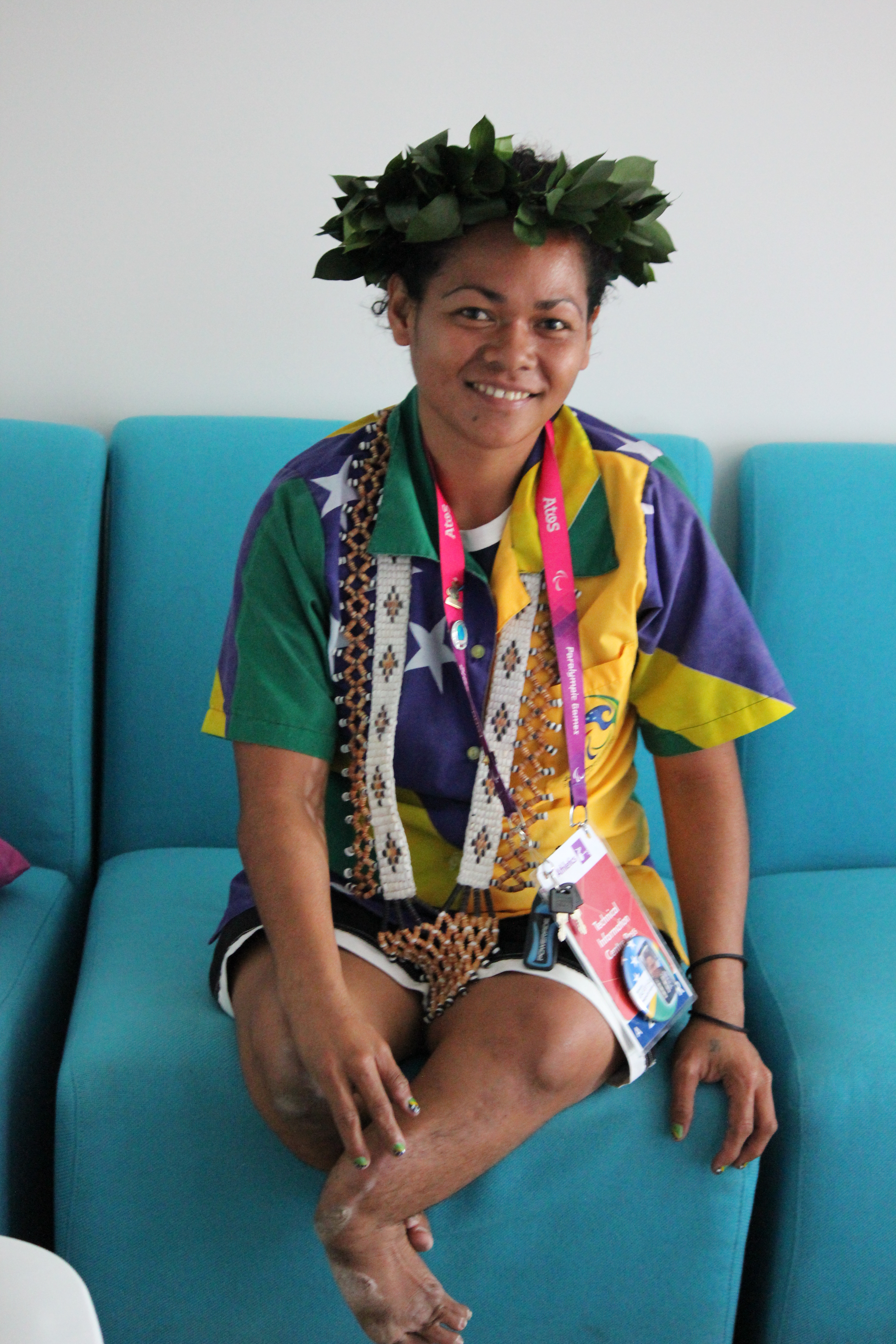
- Hellen Saohaga at the 2012 Paralympics

Personal information
- Full name: Hellen Glenda Saohaga
- Nationality: Solomon Islander
- Born: December 12, 1987 (age 37)

Sport
- Country: Solomon Islands
- Sport: Shot put
- Disability class: F57/58
- Updated on November 4, 2017

Hellen Saohaga (born 12 December 1987) is a Solomon Islander athlete, who competes in the F57/58 shot put. She became her nation's first Paralympic athlete when she competed at the 2012 Summer Paralympics in London, England.

== Career ==
Hellen Saohaga was born on 12 December 1987 in Solomon Islands. She has had deformed legs from birth, necessitating her use of a wheelchair. Following her entry in the shot put at a competition in Brisbane, Australia, in March 2012, she was offered a wildcard entry to that year's Summer Paralympics.

She was the first Paralympian for Solomon Islands, when she competed in the F57/58 women's shot put at the 2012 Games in London. It was only after qualifying that it was discovered that she did not have a throwing frame to use at the Games, and so the Australian Paralympic Committee had one custom made for her.

Prior to the Paralympics, she joined the Australian team at a team building event at Cardiff Castle, and used the same training facilities nearby. This was alongside the athletes of several other Pacific Island nations. At the 2012 Summer Paralympics opening ceremony, she carried her nation's flag in the Parade of Nations. She competed on 8 September, as one of the 17 athletes in her class of the shot put who finished the event. She finished in 15th place, ahead of Nephtalie Jean Louis of Haiti and Zambia's Rodah Mutale.

She was then one of the first five Paralympic athletes to a Solomon Islands team at a Pacific Games in 2015. In addition to athletics, she also competed in the seated table tennis. She lost in straight sets to Roden Merewalesi of Fiji in her first game, and then Papua New Guinea's Vero Paul Nime by three games to two in her second match. As a result, she finished third overall out of the three competitors in the class, winning the bronze medal.
