= Yemen at the 1992 Summer Paralympics =

- IPC code: YEM

in Barcelona
- Competitors: 2 in 2 sports
- Medals: Gold 0 Silver 0 Bronze 0 Total 0

Summer Paralympics appearances (overview)
- 1992; 1996–2016; 2020; 2024

Yemen competed at the 1992 Summer Paralympics in Barcelona, Spain. The delegation consisted of two competitors: A. M. Al-Hamdany in track and field athletics, and Said Al-Huribi in both track and field athletics and swimming. A third man, table tennis player Shaif Al-Kawlany, was registered for the games but did not compete.

== Athletics ==
Athlete	Event	Time	Rank
A. M. Al-Hamdany	Men's marathon TW3-4	did not finish	
Said Al-Huribi	Men's marathon TW3-4	did not finish	

== Swimming ==
Athlete	Event	Heats		Final	
Athlete	Event	Time	Rank	Time	Rank
Said Al-Huribi	Men's 50 m freestyle S6	57.08	19	did not advance	

== See also ==
- Yemen at the 1992 Summer Olympics
