= Saint Vincent and the Grenadines at the 2020 Summer Paralympics =

- IPC code: VIN
- NPC: National Paralympic Committee St Vincent and the Grenadines

in Tokyo
- Competitors: 1 in 1 sport
- Flag bearer: Dexroy Creese
- Medals: Gold 0 Silver 0 Bronze 0 Total 0

Summer Paralympics appearances (overview)
- 1960; 1964; 1968; 1972; 1976; 1980; 1984; 1988; 1992; 1996; 2000; 2004; 2008; 2012; 2016; 2020; 2024

Saint Vincent and the Grenadines competed at the 2020 Summer Paralympics in Tokyo, Japan, from 24 August to 5 September 2021. This was the country's debut appearance at the Paralympics.

== Swimming ==
Athlete	Event	Heats		Final	
Athlete	Event	Result	Rank	Result	Rank
Dexroy Creese	Men's 50 m freestyle S9	41.44	3	DNA	25

== See also ==
- Saint Vincent and the Grenadines at the Paralympics
- Saint Vincent and the Grenadines at the 2020 Summer Olympics
