= Haiti at the 2020 Summer Paralympics =

- Flag of Haiti
- IPC code: HAI

in Tokyo, Japan August 24, 2021 – September 5, 2021
- Competitors: 1 (1 man and 0 women) in 1 sport and 1 event
- Flag bearer: Ywenson Registre
- Medals: Gold 0 Silver 0 Bronze 0 Total 0

Summer Paralympics appearances (overview)
- 2008; 2012; 2016; 2020; 2024

Haiti competed at the 2020 Summer Paralympics in Tokyo, Japan, from 24 August to 5 September 2021. This was their fourth consecutive appearance at the Summer Paralympics since 2008.

== Competitors ==
The following is the list of number of competitors participating in the Games:

Sport	Men	Women	Total
Athletics	1	0	1
Total	1	0	1

== Athletics ==
Men's field

Athlete	Event	Final	
Athlete	Event	Result	Rank
Ywenson Registre	Shot put F57	7.13 PB	13

== See also ==
- Haiti at the Paralympics
- Haiti at the 2020 Summer Olympics
