= Kiribati at the Paralympics =

Kiribati at the Paralympic Games
- Flag of Kiribati
- IPC code: KIR
- NPC: Kiribati National Paralympic Committee

Summer appearances
- 2024

Kiribati made its Paralympic Games debut at the 2024 Games in Paris. The island nation had originally planned to debut at the 2020 Games in Tokyo but withdrew due to COVID-19 concerns.

Kiribati was granted membership to the International Paralympic Committee in October 2019. The nation's Paralympic debut in 2024 was supported by the Australian Government and Australian Olympic Committee. During the Parade of Nations at the 2024 Summer Paralympics opening ceremony, the flag of Kiribati was carried by Ongiou Timeon, who represented the nation in the men's shot put event.

== See also ==
- Kiribati at the Olympics
- Kiribati at the Commonwealth Games
