= Grenada at the 2024 Summer Paralympics =

- IPC code: GRN
- NPC: Grenada Paralympic Committee

in Paris, France August 28, 2024 – September 8, 2024
- Competitors: 2 (1 man and 1 woman) in 1 sport
- Flag bearers: Ishona Charles; Tyler Smith
- Medals: Gold 0 Silver 0 Bronze 0 Total 0

Summer Paralympics appearances (overview)
- 1960; 1964; 1968; 1972; 1976; 1980; 1984; 1988; 1992; 1996; 2000; 2004; 2008; 2012; 2016; 2020; 2024

Grenada competed at the 2024 Summer Paralympics in Paris, France, from 28 August to 8 September 2024. The delegation consisted of two competitors from one sport.

== Competitors ==
The following is the list of number of competitors in the Games.

Sport	Men	Women	Total
Athletics	1	1	2
Total	1	1	2

== Athletics ==
Athlete	Event	Final	
Athlete	Event	Result	Rank
Ishona Charles	Women's shot put F46	9.30 PB	13
Ishona Charles	Women's javelin throw F46	30.66 PB	11
Tyler Smith	Men's shot put F63	8.07 PB	9

== See also ==
- Grenada at the Paralympics
- Grenada at the 2024 Summer Olympics
