= Maldives at the 2024 Summer Paralympics =

- IPC code: MDV

in Paris, France August 28, 2024 – September 8, 2024
- Competitors: 2 (1 man and 1 woman) in 1 sport
- Flag bearers: Abdul Razzag Abdul Samad; Fathimath Ibrahim
- Medals: Gold 0 Silver 0 Bronze 0 Total 0

Summer Paralympics appearances
- 1960; 1964; 1968; 1972; 1976; 1980; 1984; 1988; 1992; 1996; 2000; 2004; 2008; 2012; 2016; 2020; 2024

Maldives competed at the 2024 Summer Paralympics in Paris, France, from 28 August to 8 September 2024. This was the nation's second time competing at the Summer Paralympic Games after it made its debut at the 2020 Summer Paralympics. The delegation consisted of two competitors from one sport.

== Competitors ==
The following is the list of number of competitors in the Games.

Sport	Men	Women	Total
Athletics	1	1	2
Total	1	1	2

== Athletics ==
Athlete	Event	Heat		Final	
Athlete	Event	Result	Rank	Result	Rank
Fathimath Ibrahim	Women's 100 metres T11	17.10	3	Did not advance	
Abdul Razzag Abdul Samad	Men's 100 metres T12	14.46	3	Did not advance	

== See also ==
- Maldives at the 2024 Summer Olympics
- Maldives at the Paralympics
