= Grenada at the 2020 Summer Paralympics =

- IPC code: GRN
- NPC: Grenada Paralympic Committee

in Tokyo
- Competitors: 2 in 2 sports
- Flag bearer: Nye Cruickshank
- Medals: Gold 0 Silver 0 Bronze 0 Total 0

Summer Paralympics appearances (overview)
- 1960; 1964; 1968; 1972; 1976; 1980; 1984; 1988; 1992; 1996; 2000; 2004; 2008; 2012; 2016; 2020; 2024

Grenada competed at the 2020 Summer Paralympics in Tokyo, Japan, from 24 August to 5 September 2021. This was the country's debut appearance at the Paralympics. Grenada was represented by 2 female athletes.

== Athletics ==
Field

| Athlete | Event | Final | |
| Athlete | Event | Result | Rank |
|---|---|---|---|
| Ishona Charles | Women's javelin throw F46 | 28.75 | 9 |

== Swimming ==
DNA: Did not advance

| Athlete | Event | Heats | | Final | |
| Athlete | Event | Result | Rank | Result | Rank |
|---|---|---|---|---|---|
| Nye Cruickshank | Women's 100 m breaststroke SB8 | 2:22.12 | 7 | DNA | 14 |

== See also ==
- Grenada at the Paralympics
- Grenada at the 2020 Summer Olympics
