= Kosovo at the 2024 Summer Paralympics =

- IPC code: KOS
- NPC: Paralympic Committee of Kosovo

in Paris, France August 28, 2024 – September 8, 2024
- Competitors: 1 in 1 sport
- Flag bearer: Grevist Bytyci
- Medals: Gold 0 Silver 0 Bronze 0 Total 0

Summer Paralympics appearances (overview)
- 2024

Kosovo competed at the 2024 Summer Paralympics in Paris, France, from 28 August to 8 September 2024. This was the nation's first time competing at the Summer Paralympic Games. The delegation consisted of one competitor from one sport.

== Background ==
The Paralympic Committee of Kosovo was granted provisional membership of the International Paralympic Committee in July 2022 and was subsequently granted full membership by the IPC General Assembly in September 2023. Grevist Bytyci represented Kosovo at the 2024 Paralympic Games.

== Competitors ==
The following is the list of number of competitors in the Games.

Sport	Men	Women	Total
Athletics	1	0	1
Total	1	0	1

== Athletics ==
Athlete	Event	Heat		Final	
Athlete	Event	Result	Rank	Result	Rank
Grevist Bytyci	Men's 1500 metres T46	—		4:32.88	15

== See also ==
- Kosovo at the 2024 Summer Olympics
- Kosovo at the Paralympics
