= Suriname at the 2004 Summer Paralympics =

- IPC code: SUR
- NPC: National Paralympic Committee of Suriname

in Athens
- Competitors: 2 in 1 sport
- Flag bearer: Andre Andrews
- Medals: Gold 0 Silver 0 Bronze 0 Total 0

Summer Paralympics appearances (overview)
- 2004; 2008; 2012; 2016; 2020; 2024

Suriname competed at the 2004 Summer Paralympics in Athens, Greece. The team included two athletes, one man and one woman, neither of whom won a medal.

== Sports ==
=== Athletics ===
==== Men's field ====
Athlete	Class	Event	Final		
Athlete	Class	Event	Result	Points	Rank
Andre Andrews	F58	Shot put	5.25	-	11

==== Women's field ====
Athlete	Class	Event	Final		
Athlete	Class	Event	Result	Points	Rank
Melaica S. Tuinfort	F58	Shot put	5.29	639	17

== See also ==
- Suriname at the Paralympics
- Suriname at the 2004 Summer Olympics
