= Paralympic Committee of Kosovo =

National Paralympic Committee of Kosovo

National Paralympic Committee
- Country: Kosovo
- Code: KOS
- Recognized: 2022 (provisional); 2023 (full)
- Headquarters: Pristina, Kosovo
- President: Njomëza Emini

The Paralympic Committee of Kosovo, (Albanian: Komiteti Paralimpik i Kosovës, Serbian: Параолимпијски комитет Косова / Paraolimpijski komitet Kosova), is the governing body for parasports in Kosovo. It is a full member of the International Paralympic Committee, granting para-athletes from Kosovo the right to patriciate in the Paralympic Games.

== History ==
The Paralympic Committee of Kosovo was granted provisional membership of the International Paralympic Committee by its Governing Board on 16 July 2022. Provisional membership granted all the privileges of full membership except the ability to vote, propose motions or nominate candidates at meetings of the General Assembly. Provisional membership gave athletes from Kosovo the right to participate in the Paralympic Games. The Kosovo Paralympic Committee was granted full membership of the International Paralympic Committee by its General Assembly on 28 September 2023. Kosovo made its Paralympic debut at the Paris 2024 Games.

== See also ==
- Kosovo at the Paralympics
- Olympic Committee of Kosovo
- Membership of Kosovo in international sports federations
