= Solomon Islands at the 2024 Summer Paralympics =

- Flag of Solomon Islands
- IPC code: SOL
- NPC: Solomon Islands Paralympics Committee

in Paris
- Competitors: 4 in 2 sports
- Flag bearers: James Ingram Gegeu; Junita Tonowane
- Medals: Gold 0 Silver 0 Bronze 0 Total 0

Summer Paralympics appearances (overview)
- 2012; 2016; 2020; 2024

Solomon Islands competed at the 2024 Summer Paralympics in Paris, France, from 28 August to 8 September 2024. This is the country's second appearance, following their withdrawal from the previous edition.

== Competitors ==
The following is the list of number of competitors participating in the Games.

Sport	Men	Women	Total
Athletics	1	0	1
Taekwondo	2	1	3
Total	3	1	4

== Athletics ==
Key

- Note–Ranks given for track events are within the athlete's heat only
- Q = Qualified for the next round
- q = Qualified for the next round as a fastest loser or, in field events, by position without achieving the qualifying target
- DQ = Disqualified
- PR = Paralympic Record
- AR = Area (or continental) Record
- NR = National Record
- SB = Season's Best
- N/A = Round not applicable for the event
- Bye = Athlete not required to compete in round

Field events

Athlete	Event	Final	
Athlete	Event	Distance	Position
Cosmol Maefolia	Men's javelin throw F38	25.62	9

== Taekwondo ==
Solomon Islands qualified four athletes to compete at the Paralympics competition, all of which had achieved the qualification standards at the 2024 Oceanian Qualification Tournament in Honiara, Solomon Islands, in April 2024.

Athlete	Event	First round	Quarterfinals	Semifinals	Final	
Athlete	Event	Opposition Result	Opposition Result	Opposition Result	Opposition Result	Rank
Solomon Jagiri	Men's −63 kg	Sadeghianpour (IRI); L 2–28	Did not advance			
James Ingram Gegeu	Men's +80 kg	Ramazanov (NPA); L 0–16	Did not advance			
Junita Tonowane	Women's −65 kg	Gjessing (DEN); L 0–25	Did not advance			

== See also ==
- Solomon Islands at the 2024 Summer Olympics
- Solomon Islands at the Paralympics
