= Yemen at the 2020 Summer Paralympics =

- IPC code: YEM
- NPC: Yemen Paralympic Committee

in Tokyo, Japan 24 August 2021 – 5 September 2021
- Competitors: 2 (1 man and 1 woman) in 1 sport
- Officials: Amal Haza Ali Munassar
- Medals: Gold 0 Silver 0 Bronze 0 Total 0

Summer Paralympics appearances (overview)
- 1992; 1996–2016; 2020; 2024

Yemen competed at the 2020 Summer Paralympics in Tokyo, Japan, from 24 August to 5 September 2021. This was the second time Yemen competed at the Paralympics, after previously competing in the 1992 Summer Paralympics 29 years prior.

== Competitors ==
Two athletes from Yemen competed at the Paralympics.

Sport	Men	Women	Total
Athletics	1	1	2
Total	1	1	2

== Athletics ==
Both of Yemen's athletes competed in athletics.

Athlete	Event	Final	
Athlete	Event	Result	Rank
Naseb Fateh Mohammed Alraoad	Men's shot put F57	6.88 PB	14
Belqes Ahmed Hezam Taresh	Women's shot put F57	4.84 PB	18
