= Kosovo at the Paralympics =

- IOC code: KOS
- NOC: Paralympic Committee of Kosovo
- Website: Paralympic Committee of Kosovo
- Medals: Gold 0 Silver 0 Bronze 0 Total 0

Summer appearances
- 2024

Other related appearances
- Yugoslavia (1920–1992W); Independent Paralympic Participants (1992S); Serbia and Montenegro (1996–2006); Serbia (2008–2012)

The Paralympic Committee of Kosovo became a member of the International Paralympic Committee on 16 July 2022. Kosovo made its Paralympic debut at the 2024 Summer Paralympics in Paris, France.

== Medal tables ==
=== Medals by Summer Games ===
Games	Athletes	Gold	Silver	Bronze	Total	Rank
(France) 2024 Paris	1	0	0	0	0	—
(United States) 2028 Los Angeles	Future event					
(Australia) 2032 Brisbane	Future event					
Total		0	0	0	0	n/a

=== Medals by Winter Games ===
Games	Athletes	Gold	Silver	Bronze	Total	Rank
(Italy) 2026 Milan Cortina	–	–	–	–	–	–
(France) 2030 French Alps	Future event					
(United States) 2034 Salt Lake City	Future event					
Total		0	0	0	0	n/a

== See also ==
- Kosovo at the Olympics
- Special Olympics Kosovo
