= Suriname at the 2008 Summer Paralympics =

- IPC code: SUR
- NPC: National Paralympic Committee of Suriname

in Beijing
- Competitors: 1 in 1 sport
- Flag bearers: Biondi Misasi (opening & closing)
- Medals Ranked -th: Gold 0 Silver 0 Bronze 0 Total 0

Summer Paralympics appearances (overview)
- 2004; 2008; 2012; 2016; 2020; 2024

Suriname sent a delegation to compete at the 2008 Summer Paralympics in Beijing, People's Republic of China. According to official records, the country's only athlete competed in athletics. Suriname did not win a medal at these Games.

== Athletics ==
Men

| Athlete | Class | Event | Heats | | Semifinal | | Final | | |
| Athlete | Class | Event | Result | Rank | Result | Rank | Result | Points | Rank |
|---|---|---|---|---|---|---|---|---|---|
| Biondi Misasi | T13 | 100 m | 11.87 | 7 | did not advance | | | | |

== See also ==
- Suriname at the Paralympics
- Suriname at the 2008 Summer Olympics
