= Solomon Islands at the 2020 Summer Paralympics =

- Flag of the Solomon Islands
- IPC code: SOL
- NPC: Solomon Islands Paralympics Committee

in Tokyo
- Competitors: 2 in 1 sport

Summer Paralympics appearances (overview)
- 2012; 2016; 2020; 2024

Solomon Islands was to compete at the 2020 Summer Paralympics in Tokyo, Japan, from 24 August to 5 September 2021, but ultimately the team withdrew from competition. The delegation was still represented by a volunteer at the 2020 Summer Paralympics Parade of Nations.

== Taekwondo ==
Solomon Islands qualified two athletes to compete at the Paralympics competition. Solomon Jagiri & Jeminah Otoa qualified by winning the gold medal at the 2020 Oceanian Qualification Tournament in Gold Coast, Australia.

Athlete	Event	First round	Quarterfinals	Semifinals	Final	
Athlete	Event	Opposition Result	Opposition Result	Opposition Result	Opposition Result	Rank
Solomon Jagiri	Men's –61 kg					
Jeminah Otoa	Women's –58 kg					
