= Haiti at the 2016 Summer Paralympics =

- IPC code: HAI
- NPC: Comité National Paralympique d'Haïti

in Rio de Janeiro
- Competitors: 1 in 1 sports
- Flag bearer: Jean Indris Santerre
- Medals: Gold 0 Silver 0 Bronze 0 Total 0

Summer Paralympics appearances (overview)
- 2008; 2012; 2016; 2020; 2024

Haiti sent a delegation to compete at the 2016 Summer Paralympics in Rio de Janeiro, Brazil from 7 to 18 September 2016. The country's participation in Rio marked its third appearance at the quadrennial event and its delegation consisted of one shot put thrower Jean Indris Santerre, who qualified for the games by being issued a wild card from the International Paralympic Committee after being unable to qualify on merit. He was chosen as the flag bearer for the opening ceremony. Santerre did not start the final of the men's F57 shot put competition held at the Maracanã Stadium on 17 September for unknown reasons.

== Background ==
Haiti participated in three Summer Paralympic Games between its début at the 2008 Summer Paralympics in Beijing and the 2016 Summer Paralympics in Rio de Janeiro. Entering the 2016 competition, the highest number of para-athletes sent by Haiti to a Summer Paralympics is three to the 2012 Games in London. No Haitian para-athlete has ever won a medal at the Summer Paralympics. Haiti participated in the Rio Summer Paralympics from 7 to 18 September 2016. The Comité National Paralympique d'Haïti (CNPH) sent a single shot put thrower to the Games, Jean Indris Santerre, and was accompanied by chef de mission Tony Régis, Samuel Charles and Fabiola Sénord and two other officials; all six departed for Rio de Janeiro on 31 August. Only one para-athlete was sent because Haiti did not have the required funding for more than one competitor in the Paralympics and not taking part in Rio de Janeiro would have meant the CNPH would have risked its accreditation and license being revoked by the International Paralympic Committee (IPC). Santerre was the selected as the flag bearer for the opening ceremony.

== Disability classifications ==
Every participant at the Paralympics has their disability grouped into one of five disability categories; amputation, the condition may be congenital or sustained through injury or illness; cerebral palsy; wheelchair athletes, there is often overlap between this and other categories; visual impairment, including blindness; Les autres, any physical disability that does not fall strictly under one of the other categories, for example dwarfism or multiple sclerosis. Each Paralympic sport then has its own classifications, dependent upon the specific physical demands of competition. Events are given a code, made of numbers and letters, describing the type of event and classification of the athletes competing. Some sports, such as athletics, divide athletes by both the category and severity of their disabilities, other sports, for example swimming, group competitors from different categories together, the only separation being based on the severity of the disability.

== Athletics ==
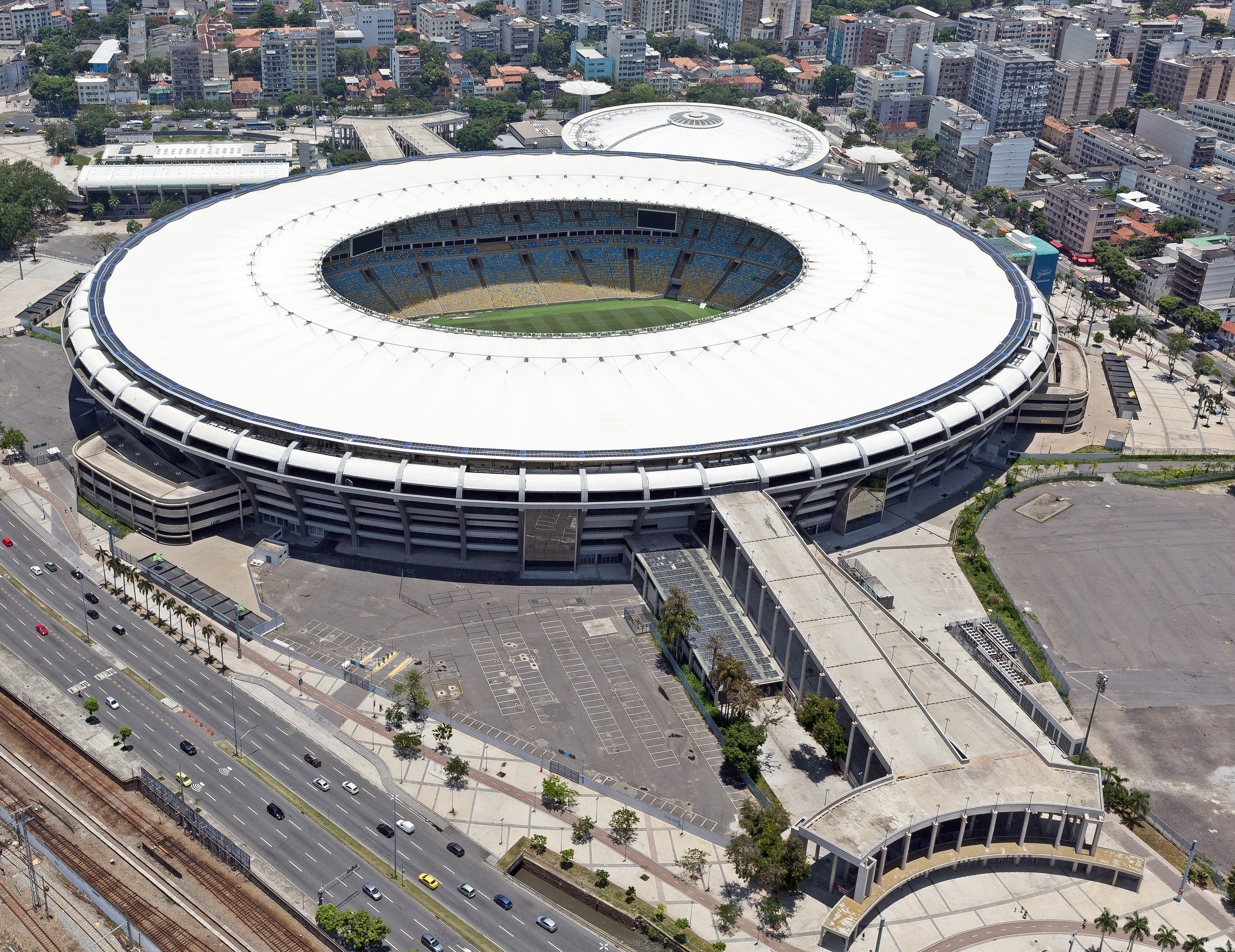
The Maracanã Stadium, where Santerre competed in shot put competitions.

Jean Indris Santerre, a computer technician whose left leg was amputated three days after the 2010 Haiti earthquake and has had to use a prosthetic leg since, was the sole para-athlete to represent Haiti at the Rio Summer Paralympics and was 46 years old at the time of the Games. He qualified for the Paralympics by the IPC issuing him a wild card as his personal best of six metres did not merit him automatic qualification and trained for four hours per day for three mornings per week with an $8,000 budget in the run-up to the Games. Santerre is a F58 classified athletes competing in a wheelchair as those with one leg are considered suitable for the category. He spoke of his hope that he would improve on his personal best, and vowed to perform to the best of his ability. Santerre was scheduled to compete in the men's F57 shot put competition held at the Maracanã Stadium on 17 September but was unable to start the event for unknown reasons.

=== Men's Field ===
Athlete	Events	Result	Rank
Jean Indris Santerre	Shot Put F56-57	DNS	

== See also ==
- Haiti at the 2016 Summer Olympics
