= Suriname at the 2016 Summer Paralympics =

- IPC code: SUR
- NPC: National Paralympic Committee of Suriname

in Rio de Janeiro
- Competitors: 1 in 1 sport
- Flag bearer: Biondi Misasi
- Medals: Gold 0 Silver 0 Bronze 0 Total 0

Summer Paralympics appearances (overview)
- 2004; 2008; 2012; 2016; 2020; 2024

Suriname sent a delegation to compete at the 2016 Summer Paralympics in Rio de Janeiro, Brazil, held from 7 to 18 September 2016. This was its fourth appearance at a Summer Paralympic Games since it debuted at the 2004 Summer Paralympics. Suriname was represented by one athlete, sprinter and long jumper Biondi Misasi, who was making his third appearance in the Paralympics. He took part in two athletics event and his best performance at these Paralympics was seventh overall in the men's 100 metres T12 event. Misasi did not progress to the final since only the top four in all heats advanced to that stage.

== Background ==
Suriname made its debut in Paralympic competition at the 2004 Summer Paralympics. The nation has participated in every Summer Paralympics since, making Rio de Janeiro its fourth appearance at a Summer Paralympic Games. At the close of the Rio Summer Games, Suriname has not won their first medal and the country has not debuted in the Winter Paralympic Games. The 2016 Summer Paralympics were held from 7–18 September 2016 with a total of 4,328 athletes representing 159 National Paralympic Committees taking part. The country sent one athlete to the Rio Paralympic Games, short-distance sprinter and long jumper Biondi Misasi. He was accompanied by Edward Gessel, a member of the National Paralympic Committee of Suriname, and the Ministry of Sports and Youth Affairs gave the team a financial contribution to compete in Rio de Janeiro. Misasi was selected as the flag bearer for the parade of nations during the opening ceremony.

== Disability classification ==
Every participant at the Paralympics has their disability grouped into one of five disability categories; amputation, the condition may be congenital or sustained through injury or illness; cerebral palsy; wheelchair athletes, there is often overlap between this and other categories; visual impairment, including blindness; Les autres, any physical disability that does not fall strictly under one of the other categories, for example dwarfism or multiple sclerosis. Each Paralympic sport then has its own classifications, dependent upon the specific physical demands of competition. Events are given a code, made of numbers and letters, describing the type of event and classification of the athletes competing. Some sports, such as athletics, divide athletes by both the category and severity of their disabilities, other sports, for example swimming, group competitors from different categories together, the only separation being based on the severity of the disability.

== Athletics ==
Suriname qualified one athlete in athletics, Biondi Misasi. His best time of 11.50 seconds in the men's 100 metres T12 meet the "B" qualifying standard for that event and his mark in the men's long jump F12 was 0.22 metres farther than that competition's "A" qualifying standard. Misasi was 25 years old at the time of the Rio Summer Paralympics. He was competing for the third time in the Paralympics, having previously competed on Suriname's behalf at the 2008 Summer Paralympics and the 2012 Summer Paralympics. Misasi is classified as T12/F12 because of a visual impairment. Before the Games, he said, “I truly believe I can win a bronze medal in the long jump event. The truth is that I am still too far behind the best athletes, thus winning a gold or silver medal is impossible for me. But I am working hard to pick up the bronze.” On September 10, Misasi competed in the men's long jump F12, ranking 12th and last out of all athletes, with a best mark of 6.25 metres, and attributed the result on nyctalopia. Four days later, he participated in the first round of the men's 100 metres T12 and was drawn to heat three. Misasi finished with a time of 11.56 seconds, third and last of all the finishing runners in his heat. Since only the top four from all heats were permitted to advance to the final, Misasi did not because he was seventh overall. (Note: Two athletes, Mansur Abdirashidov and Diogo Ualisson Jeronimo da Silva were disqualified.)

Men’s Track and Road Events

Athlete	Events	Heat		Final	
Athlete	Events	Time	Rank	Time	Rank
Biondi Misasi	100 m T12	11.56	3	did not advance	

Field

Athlete	Events	Result	Rank
Biondi Misasi	Long Jump F12	6.25	12

== See also ==
- Suriname at the 2016 Summer Olympics
