= Saint Vincent and the Grenadines at the 2024 Summer Paralympics =

- IPC code: VIN
- NPC: National Paralympic Committee St Vincent and the Grenadines

in Paris, France August 28, 2024 – September 8, 2024
- Competitors: 1 in 1 sport
- Flag bearer: Kentreal Timothy Kydd
- Medals: Gold 0 Silver 0 Bronze 0 Total 0

Summer Paralympics appearances (overview)
- 1960; 1964; 1968; 1972; 1976; 1980; 1984; 1988; 1992; 1996; 2000; 2004; 2008; 2012; 2016; 2020; 2024

Saint Vincent and the Grenadines competed at the 2024 Summer Paralympics in Paris, France, from 28 August to 8 September 2024. This was the nation's second time competing at the Summer Paralympic Games after it made its debut at the 2020 Summer Paralympics. The delegation consisted of only one competitor from one sport.

== Competitors ==
The following is the list of number of competitors in the Games.

Sport	Men	Women	Total
Swimming	1	0	1
Total	1	0	1

== Swimming ==
Athlete	Event	Final	
Athlete	Event	Result	Rank
Kentreal Timothy Kydd	Men's 50 metre freestyle S9	31.45	17

== See also ==
- Saint Vincent and the Grenadines at the Paralympics
- Saint Vincent and the Grenadines at the 2024 Summer Olympics
