= Solomon Islands at the Paralympics =

- Flag of Solomon Islands
- IPC code: SOL
- NPC: Solomon Islands Paralympics Committee
- Medals: Gold 0 Silver 0 Bronze 0 Total 0

Summer appearances
- 2012; 2016; 2020; 2024

Solomon Islands made its Paralympic Games début at the 2012 Summer Paralympics in London, sending a single wheelchair athlete (Hellen Saohaga) to compete in the shot put.

== Full results for Solomon Islands at the Paralympics ==
Name	Games	Sport	Event	Score	Rank
Hellen Glenda Saohaga	2012 London	Athletics	Women's Shot put F57-58	5.23 m 298 points	15

== See also ==
- Solomon Islands at the Olympics
