= Suriname at the 2024 Summer Paralympics =

2024 sporting event delegation in Paris

- Flag of Suriname
- IPC code: SUR
- NPC: National Paralympic Committee of Suriname

in Paris, France August 28, 2024 – September 8, 2024
- Competitors: 1 (1 man) in 1 sport
- Flag bearer: Volunteer
- Medals: Gold 0 Silver 0 Bronze 0 Total 0

Summer Paralympics appearances (overview)
- 2004; 2008; 2012; 2016; 2020; 2024

Suriname competed at the 2024 Summer Paralympics in Paris, France, from 28 August to 8 September 2024.

== Competitors ==
The following is the list of number of competitors in the Games, including game-eligible alternates in team sports.

Sport	Men	Women	Total
Athletics	1	0	1
Total	1	0	1

== Athletics ==
Key

- Note–Ranks given for track events are within the athlete's heat only
- Q = Qualified for the next round
- q = Qualified for the next round as a fastest loser or, in field events, by position without achieving the qualifying target
- DQ = Disqualified
- PR = Paralympic Record
- AR = Area (or continental) Record
- NR = National Record
- N/A = Round not applicable for the event
- Bye = Athlete not required to compete in round

Field events

Athlete	Event	Final	
Athlete	Event	Result	Rank
Chivaro Belfort	Men's shot put F46	DNS	–

== See also ==
- Suriname at the 2024 Summer Olympics
- Suriname at the Paralympics
