= Haiti at the 2024 Summer Paralympics =

- IPC code: HAI

in Paris, France August 28, 2024 – September 8, 2024
- Competitors: 1 in 1 sport
- Flag bearer: Ywenson Registre
- Medals: Gold 0 Silver 0 Bronze 0 Total 0

Summer Paralympics appearances (overview)
- 2008; 2012; 2016; 2020; 2024

Haiti competed at the 2024 Summer Paralympics in Paris, France, from 28 August to 8 September 2024. This was the nation's fifth time competing at the Summer Paralympic Games after it made its debut sixteen years prior at the 2008 Summer Paralympics. The delegation consisted of only one Athlete from one sport.

== Competitors ==
The following is the list of number of competitors in the Games.

Sport	Men	Women	Total
Athletics	1	0	1
Total	1	0	1

== Athletics ==
Athlete	Event	Final	
Athlete	Event	Result	Rank
Ywenson Registre	Men's shot put F57	6.95 SB	11

== See also ==
- Haiti at the 2024 Summer Olympics
- Haiti at the Paralympics
