= European Minigolf Sport Federation =

Sports governing body in Europe

European Minigolf Sport Federation - EMF is the umbrella organisation of minigolf players throughout Europe. Its members are national minigolf federations.

== Members ==
Nation	Federation	Notes
Albania	Shoqata Shqiptare e Minigolfit	
Armenia	National Golf Association of Armenia	
Austria	Österreichischer Bahnengolf-Verband	
Belarus	Belarus Golf Association	
Belgium	Union Belge de Golfe Miniature	
Croatia	Croatian Minigolf Federation	
Cyprus	Cyprus City Mini Golf	
Czech Republic	Ceský Minigolfový Svaz	
Denmark	Dansk Minigolf Union	
Estonia	Estonian Minigolf Association	
Finland	Suomen Ratagolfliitto	
France	Fédération Francaise de Golf sur Pistes	
Georgia	Georgian National Golf Federation	
Germany	Deutscher Minigolfsport Verband	
United Kingdom	British Mini Golf Association	
Hungary	Magyar Minigolf Országos Szakszövetség	
Israel	Israeli Minigolf Association (R.A.)	
Italy	Federazione Italiana Golf su Pista	
Kosovo	Federata e Minigolfit e Kosovës	
Latvia	Latvian Minigolf Clubs Association	
Liechtenstein	Liechtensteiner Minigolf-Sport-Verband	
Luxembourg	Fédération Luxombourgeoise de Golf sur Pistes	
Moldova	National Golf Federation of Moldova	
Netherlands	Nederlandse Minigolf Bond (NMB)	
Norway	Norges Minigolf Forbund	
Poland	Polish Minigolf Association	
Portugal	Federação Portuguesa de Minigolfe	
Romania	Romania Club Sportiv Minigolf Riviera	
Russia	Russian Minigolf Association	
Serbia	Serbia Minigolf Association	
Slovakia	Slovensky Zvàz Dràhovèho Golfu	
Slovenia	Mini Golf Zveza Slovenije	
Spain	Spanish Minigolf Association, Agrupación Madrileña de Minigolf	
Sweden	Svenska Bangolfförbundet	
Switzerland	Switzerland Swiss Minigolf	

== See also ==
- Minigolf
