= Athletics at the 2016 Summer Paralympics – Men's 100 metres T12 =

Men's 100 metres T12 at the XV Paralympic Games
- Venue: Estádio Olímpico João Havelange
- Dates: 14–15 September 2016
- Competitors: 10 from 10 nations

Medalists
1st place, gold medalist(s)		Leinier Savon Pineda	Cuba
2nd place, silver medalist(s)		Ndodomzi Jonathan Ntutu	South Africa
3rd place, bronze medalist(s)		Thomas Ulbricht	Germany

The T12 category is for athletes with visual impairment. Athletes in this category will generally have some residual sight, the ability to recognise the shape of a hand at a distance of 2 metres and the ability to perceive clearly will be no more than 2/60. T12 athletes commonly run with guides.

The Men's 100 metres T12 event at the 2016 Paralympic Games took place 14–15 September 2016, at the Estádio Olímpico João Havelange.

== Heats ==
=== Heat 1 ===
12:13 14 September 2016:

Rank	Lane	Bib	Name	Nationality	Reaction	Time	Notes
1	3	1354	Leinier Savon Pineda	Cuba	0.172	10.89	Q
2	7	1084	Elmir Jabrayilov	Azerbaijan	0.148	11.27	q
3	5	2203	Tobias Jonsson	Sweden	0.137	11.57	

=== Heat 2 ===
12:20 14 September 2016:

Rank	Lane	Bib	Name	Nationality	Reaction	Time	Notes
1	5	1553	Thomas Ulbricht	Germany	0.212	11.40	Q
2	7	1237	Mingyu Chen	China	0.119	11.42	
	3	2393	Mansur Abdirashidov	Uzbekistan			DSQ

=== Heat 3 ===
12:27 14 September 2016:

Rank	Lane	Bib	Name	Nationality	Reaction	Time	Notes
1	1	2087	Ndodomzi Jonathan Ntutu	South Africa	0.166	11.10	Q
2	7	1877	Jesus Manuel Martinez Valles	Mexico	0.173	11.48	
3	3	2188	Biondi Misasi	Suriname	0.163	11.56	
	5	1148	Diogo Ualisson Jeronimo da Silva	Brazil			DSQ

== Final ==
18:10 15 September 2016:

Rank	Lane	Bib	Name	Nationality	Reaction	Time	Notes
1st place, gold medalist(s)	3	1354	Leinier Savon Pineda	Cuba	0.166	10.97	
2nd place, silver medalist(s)	5	2087	Ndodomzi Jonathan Ntutu	South Africa	0.138	11.09	
3rd place, bronze medalist(s)	7	1553	Thomas Ulbricht	Germany	0.156	11.39	
4	1	1084	Elmir Jabrayilov	Azerbaijan	0.154	11.51	
