= Haiti at the 2012 Summer Paralympics =

- IPC code: HAI
- NPC: Comité National Paralympique d'Haïti

in London
- Competitors: 3 in 2 sports
- Medals: Gold 0 Silver 0 Bronze 0 Total 0

Summer Paralympics appearances (overview)
- 2008; 2012; 2016; 2020; 2024

Haiti competed at the 2012 Summer Paralympics in London, United Kingdom from August 29 to September 9, 2012.

Technically, it was Haiti's second participation in the Paralaympics. In 2008, however, the country's sole representative, powerlifter Nephtalie Jean-Louis, was a non-starter in her event due to unspecified "problems with her weight". For the London Games, Haiti was represented by three athletes: wheelchair athlete Nephtalie Jean-Louis, this time in the women's javelin and the shot put; Josué Cajuste (who has "one leg much shorter than the other"), in the men's shot put and javelin; and Gaysli Leon, who "was paralysed in the 2010 earthquake", in road cycling in a handbike.

== Athletics ==
Men’s Field Events

Athlete	Event	Distance	Points	Rank
Josue Cajuste	Shot Put F42-44	7.63	238	11
Josue Cajuste	Javelin Throw F42	31.38	—	11

Women’s Field Events

Athlete	Event	Distance	Points	Rank
Nephtalie Jean-Louis	Shot Put F57-58	4.75	228	16
Nephtalie Jean-Louis	Javelin Throw F57-58	10.69	207	17

== Cycling ==
=== Road ===
Men

Athlete	Event	Time	Rank
Gaysli Leon	Road Race H3	LAP	
Gaysli Leon	Time Trial H3	45:03.66	10

== See also ==
- Haiti at the Paralympics
- Haiti at the 2012 Summer Olympics
