= Nephtalie Jean-Louis =

Haitian Paralympic athlete

Personal information
- National team: Haiti

Sport
- Country: Haiti
- Sport: Powerlifting, javelin and shot put

Nephtalie Jean-Louis is a Haitian Paralympic athlete, who was the sole competitor in Haiti's first Summer Paralympics team in 2008 in Beijing, China. She competed again at the 2012 Summer Paralympics in London, England, in javelin and shot put.

== Career ==
At the age of 8 months, her leg became injured after she caught polio. She since continued to live in Haiti where she has suffered discrimination because of her disability, including the inability to use public transport because of prejudice. Jean-Louis turned to sport, initially competing in powerlifting.

After competing at the 2007 Parapan American Games in Rio de Janeiro, Brazil, in powerlifting, she qualified for the 2008 Summer Paralympics in Beijing, China. Her entry at the Paralympics was announced by Jean Chevalier Sanon, the President of the National Paralympic Committee of Haiti, on 28 August 2008. This marked the first occasions Haiti took part in the Paralympic Games. Jean-Louis was the flag bearer for Haiti during the Parade of Nations within the opening ceremony. However, she was unable to participate in her weight class of the powerlifting after being unable to meet the weight limit.

Following the Games, Jean-Louis switched to athletics to compete in javelin, discus and shot put. She was selected once again for the Haitian Paralympic team for the 2012 Summer Paralympics, alongside Josue Cajuste, with both competing in javelin and shot put. The team was aided in going to London through a campaign called "The Dream", funded by the Hogan Lovells law firm. Jean-Louis finished in 17th position in the women's javelin throw in the F57/58 class. Her longest throw was 10.69 metres (35.1 ft). In the same class of the shot put, Jean-Louis threw a distance of 4.75 metres (15.6 ft), finishing in 16th place.
