= Yemen at the 2024 Summer Paralympics =

- Flag of Yemen
- IPC code: YEM
- NPC: Yemen Paralympic Committee

in Paris, France August 28, 2024 – September 8, 2024
- Competitors: 1 (1 man) in 1 sport
- Flag bearer: Naseb Fateh Mohammed Alraoad
- Medals: Gold 0 Silver 0 Bronze 0 Total 0

Summer Paralympics appearances (overview)
- 1992; 1996–2016; 2020; 2024

Yemen competed at the 2024 Summer Paralympics in Paris, France, from 28 August to 8 September 2024. This was the nation's third time competing at the Summer Paralympic Games after it made its debut at the 1992 Summer Paralympics. The delegation consisted of only one Athlete from one sport.

== Competitors ==
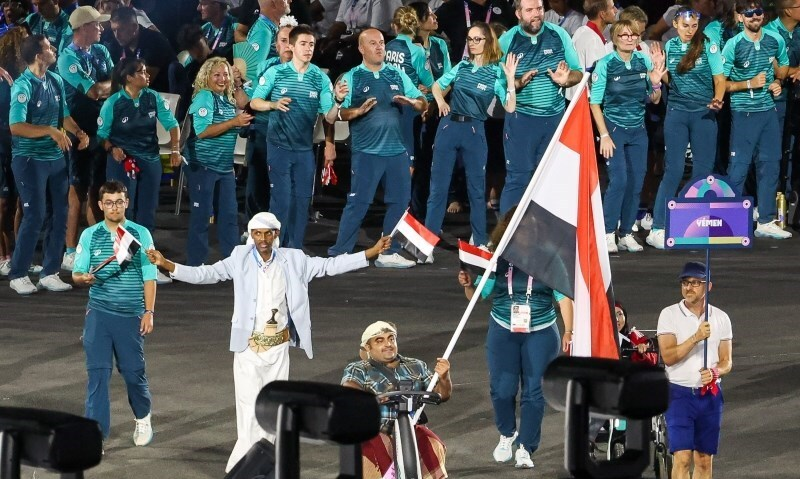
Yemen at the opening ceremony

The following is the list of number of competitors in the Games.

Sport	Men	Women	Total
Athletics	1	0	1
Total	1	0	1

== Athletics ==
Athlete	Event	Final	
Athlete	Event	Result	Rank
Naseb Fateh Mohammed Alraoad	Men's shot put F57	7.02	10

== See also ==
- Yemen at the 2024 Summer Olympics
- Yemen at the Paralympics
