= Oceania Paralympic Committee =

International regional committee representing Oceania

- Formation: 2006
- Type: Sports federation
- Headquarters: Suva, Fiji
- Members: 9 National Paralympic Committees
- Official language: English
- President: (Australia) Paul Bird
- Website: OceaniaParalympic.org

Oceania Paralympic Committee (acronym: OPC) is an organisation based in Sydney, Australia. It is an international organization that congregates the National Paralympic Committees (NPCs) of Oceania whose number, as of July 2025, is 9.

== History ==
old logo

The Oceania Paralympic Committee was formed in 2006 when the FESPIC Federation was divided into two separate bodies, the Oceania Paralympic Committee and the Asian Paralympic Committee (APC).

== Member countries ==
In the following table, the year in which the NPC was recognised by the International Paralympic Committee (IPC) is also given if it is different from the year in which the NPC was created.

Nation	Code	National Paralympic Committee	Created	Ref.
Australia	AUS	Paralympics Australia	1990	
Fiji	FIJ	Fiji Paralympic Association	1990	
Kiribati	KIR	Kiribati National Paralympic Committee		
New Zealand	NZL	Paralympics New Zealand	1968	
Papua New Guinea	PNG	Papua New Guinea Paralympic Committee		
Samoa	SAM	Samoa Paralympic Committee		
Solomon Islands	SOL	Solomon Islands Paralympic Committee		
Tonga	TGA	Tonga National Paralympic Committee		
Vanuatu	VAN	Vanuatu Paralympic Committee		

== See also ==
- Oceania National Olympic Committees
