= Eritrea at the 2024 Summer Paralympics =

- IPC code: ERI
- NPC: Eritrean National Paralympic Committee

in Paris, France 28 August 2024 – 8 September 2024
- Competitors: 1 (1 man) in 1 sport and 2 events
- Flag bearer: Sibhatu Kesete Weldemariam
- Medals: Gold 0 Silver 0 Bronze 0 Total 0

Summer appearances
- 2024

Eritrea competed at the 2024 Summer Paralympics in Paris, France, from 28 August to 8 September 2024. This was the nation's first time competing at the Summer Paralympic Games. The delegation consists of one competitor from one sport.

== Competitors ==
The following is the list of number of competitors in the Games.

| Sport | Men | Women | Total |
|---|---|---|---|
| Athletics | 1 | 0 | 1 |
| Total | 1 | 0 | 1 |

== Athletics ==
| Athlete | Event | Heats | | Final | |
| Athlete | Event | Result | Rank | Result | Rank |
|---|---|---|---|---|---|
| Sibhatu Kesete Weldemariam | Men's 100 metres T54 | 19.81 | 7 | Did not advance | |
| Sibhatu Kesete Weldemariam | Men's 400 metres T54 | DSQ | | Did not advance | |

== See also ==
- Eritrea at the 2024 Summer Olympics
