= Josué Cajuste =

Haitian Paralympic athlete

Josué Cajuste (born 16 May 1984) is a Paralympic athlete of Haiti. His disability is congenital. He began playing football, but on a 2011 tour of the US he "discovered" shot-put and javelin. He stated that competing for Haiti at the 2012 Summer Paralympics was going to be "one of the proudest moments of my life." The earthquake in Haiti impacted his life, and so to train for the London Paralympics he had to train "amongst the rubble; wherever we can."
