= Kosovo Ski Federation =

Governing body for skiing in Kosovo

- Sport: Skiing
- Jurisdiction: Kosovo
- Affiliation: International Ski and Snowboard Federation (FIS)
- Affiliation date: 2011

Official website
- fs-kos.com
- (Kosovo)

The Kosovo Ski Federation (Albanian: Federata Skitare e Kosovës or FSK) is the official governing body for the sport of skiing in Kosovo. Since 1991, members earned 25 medals in international competitions, at first under the flags of various countries where they resided, including France, Italy, Austria, the Czech Republic, Slovakia, Hungary, Turkey, and Slovenia. FSK delegates first attended the International Ski and Snowboard Federation (FIS) conference in Portugal in 2006, and on 7 November 2011, the FSK became a full FIS member.

== History of skiing in Kosovo ==
The Rugova region is known as the cradle of skiing in the Balkans. In 1928, Profs. Bardhyl Zajmi and Hajrullah Gruda brought the first skis to Kosovo, and local competitions soon began in the Zatra neighborhood of Peć. The first local seminars for ski instructors were held in the Rugovan village of Bogë from 24 December 1950 to March 1951, concurrent with the first nationwide competition.

Until 1974, the sport was handled by the local federation for mountaineering. The original club, named KS Rusolia, has been joined by three others, KS Peja, KS Alpi, and KS Rugova. Rusolia assisted with the 1984 Winter Olympics held in Sarajevo.
