= 2024 Summer Paralympics =

Multi-parasport event in Paris, France

XVII Paralympic Games
- Location: Paris, France
- Motto: Games Wide Open (French: Ouvrons Grand les Jeux)
- Nations: 170 (including the NPA and RPT teams)
- Athletes: 4,433
- Events: 549 in 22 sports
- Opening: 28 August 2024
- Closing: 8 September 2024
- Opened by: Emmanuel Macron; President of France
- Closed by: Andrew Parsons; President of the International Paralympic Committee
- Cauldron: Alexis Hanquinquant; Nantenin Keïta; Charles-Antoine Kouakou; Fabien Lamirault; Élodie Lorandi
- Stadium: Place de la Concorde (Opening ceremony); Stade de France (Closing ceremony)

The 2024 Summer Paralympics (French: Jeux paralympiques d'été de 2024), also known as the Paris 2024 Paralympic Games (French: Jeux paralympiques d'été de Paris 2024), and branded as Paris 2024, were the 17th Summer Paralympic Games, an international multi-sport parasports event governed by the International Paralympic Committee. The Games were held in Paris, France, from 28 August to 8 September 2024, and featured 549 medal events across 22 sports. These games marked the first time Paris hosted the Summer Paralympics and the second time France hosted the Paralympic Games, following the 1992 Winter Paralympics in Tignes and Albertville. France also hosted the 2024 Summer Olympics. The Paralympics return to its usual 4-year cycle following the 2020 Summer Paralympics in Tokyo, Japan postponed until 2021 due to the COVID-19 pandemic.

China topped the medal table for the sixth consecutive Paralympics, winning 94 golds and 221 total medals. Great Britain finished second for the tenth time, with 49 golds and 124 total medals. The United States finished third, with 36 golds, and 105 total medals. Additionally, Mauritius, Nepal, and the Refugee Paralympic Team won their first-ever Paralympic medals. The host nation, France, finished eighth with 19 gold and 75 total medals.

== Bidding process ==
As part of a formal agreement between the International Paralympic Committee and the International Olympic Committee first established in 2001, the winner of the bid for the 2024 Summer Olympics must also host the 2024 Summer Paralympics.

Due to concerns over a number of cities withdrawing in the bid process of the 2022 Winter Olympics and 2024 Summer Olympics, a process to award the 2024 and 2028 Games simultaneously to the final two cities in the running to host the 2024 Summer Olympics – Los Angeles and Paris – was approved at an Extraordinary IOC Session on 11 July 2017 in Lausanne. Paris was understood to be the preferred host for the 2024 Games. On 31 July 2017, the IOC announced Los Angeles as the sole candidate for the 2028 Games, opening Paris up to be confirmed as host for the 2024 Games. Both decisions were ratified at the 131st IOC Session on 13 September 2017.

== Development and preparations ==
=== Venues ===
Facilities in the Paris area. Navigate the map for other facilities.

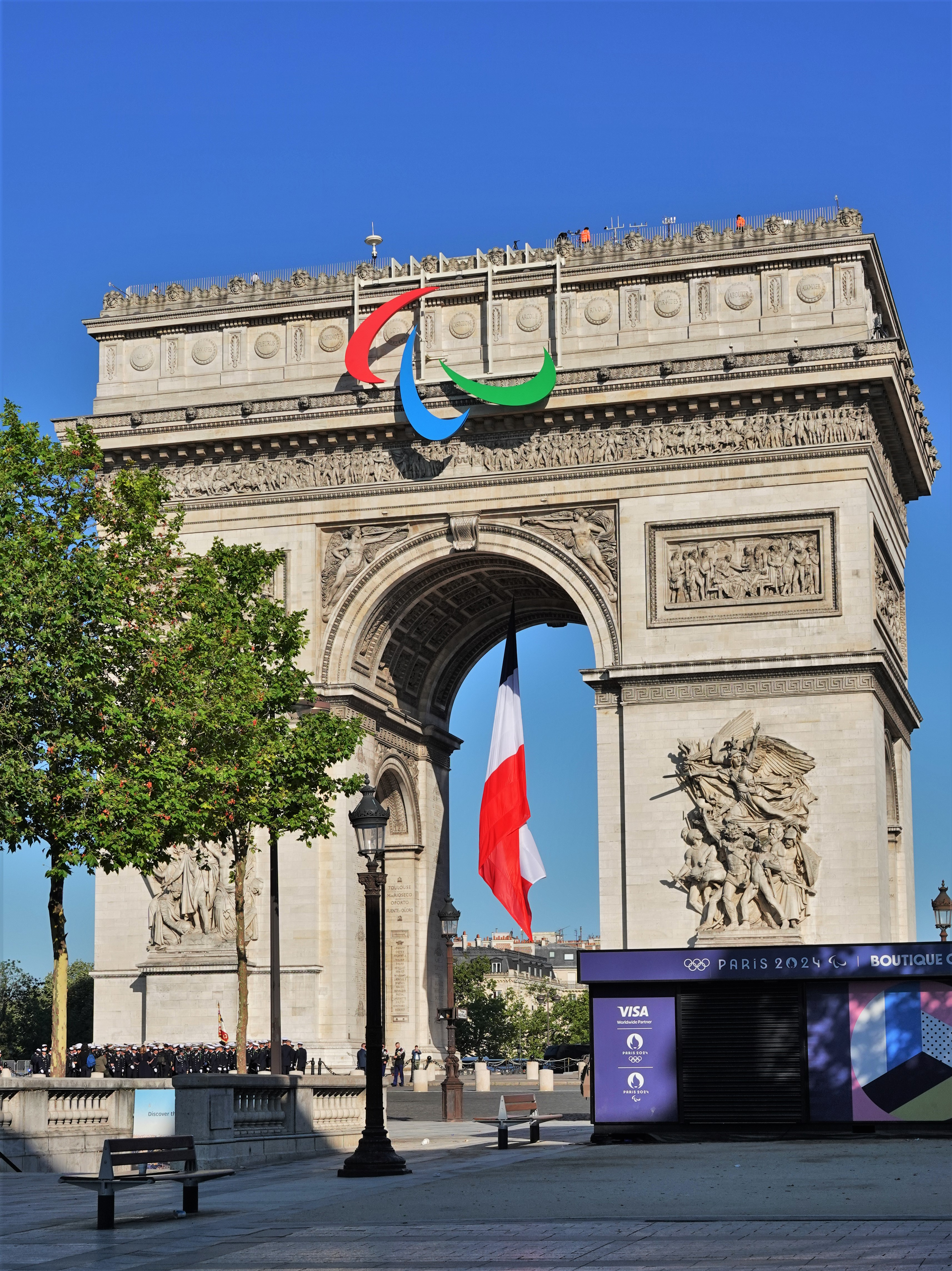
The Arc de Triomphe with the Agitos

All the Paralympic events were held in and around Paris, including the suburbs of Saint-Denis and Versailles, and Vaires-sur-Marne which is just outside the city environs.

==== Grand Paris zone ====
Venue	Events	Capacity	Status
Stade de France	Closing Ceremony	77,083	Existing
Stade de France	Athletics (Track and Field)	77,083	Existing
Paris La Défense Arena	Swimming	15,220	Existing
Porte de La Chapelle Arena	Badminton	6,700	Additional
Porte de La Chapelle Arena	Powerlifting	7,000	Additional
Clichy-sous-Bois	Cycling (Road)	–	Temporary
North Paris Arena	Sitting volleyball	6,000	Existing
Parc Georges Valbon – La Courneuve	Marathon (start)	–	Temporary

==== Paris Centre zone ====
Venue	Events	Capacity	Status
Bercy Arena	Wheelchair Basketball	15,000	Existing
Grand Palais Éphémère	Judo	8,356	Existing
Grand Palais Éphémère	Wheelchair Rugby	8,356	Existing
Eiffel Tower Stadium (Champ de Mars)	Blind football	12,860	Temporary
Les Invalides	Archery, Marathon (finish)	8,000	Temporary
Grand Palais	Taekwondo	6,500	Existing
Grand Palais	Wheelchair Fencing	6,500	Existing
Pont Alexandre III	Triathlon	1,000	Temporary
Stade Roland Garros	Wheelchair Tennis	12,000	Existing
South Paris Arena	Boccia	9,000	Existing
South Paris Arena	Table tennis	6,650	Existing
South Paris Arena	Goalball	7,300	Existing

==== Versailles zone ====
Venue	Events	Capacity	Status
Gardens of the Palace of Versailles	Equestrian	80,000 (22,000 + 58,000)	Temporary

==== Outlying venues ====
Venue	Events	Capacity	Status
Vaires-sur-Marne Nautical Stadium (Île de loisirs de Vaires-Torcy)	Canoe	12,000	Existing
Vaires-sur-Marne Nautical Stadium (Île de loisirs de Vaires-Torcy)	Rowing	14,000	Existing
Vélodrome de Saint-Quentin-en-Yvelines	Cycling (Track)	5,000	Existing
National Shooting Centre (Châteauroux)	Shooting	3,000	Existing

==== Non-competitive venues ====
Venue	Use	Capacity	Status
Place de la Concorde	Opening Ceremony	65,000	Temporary
Olympic Village, L'Île-Saint-Denis	Paralympic Village	17,000	Additional
Parc de l'Aire des Vents, Dugny	Media Village	–	Temporary
Le Bourget Exhibition Centre and Media Village, Le Bourget	International Broadcast Centre	–	Existing
Paris Congress Centre	Main Press Centre	–	Existing

=== Medals ===
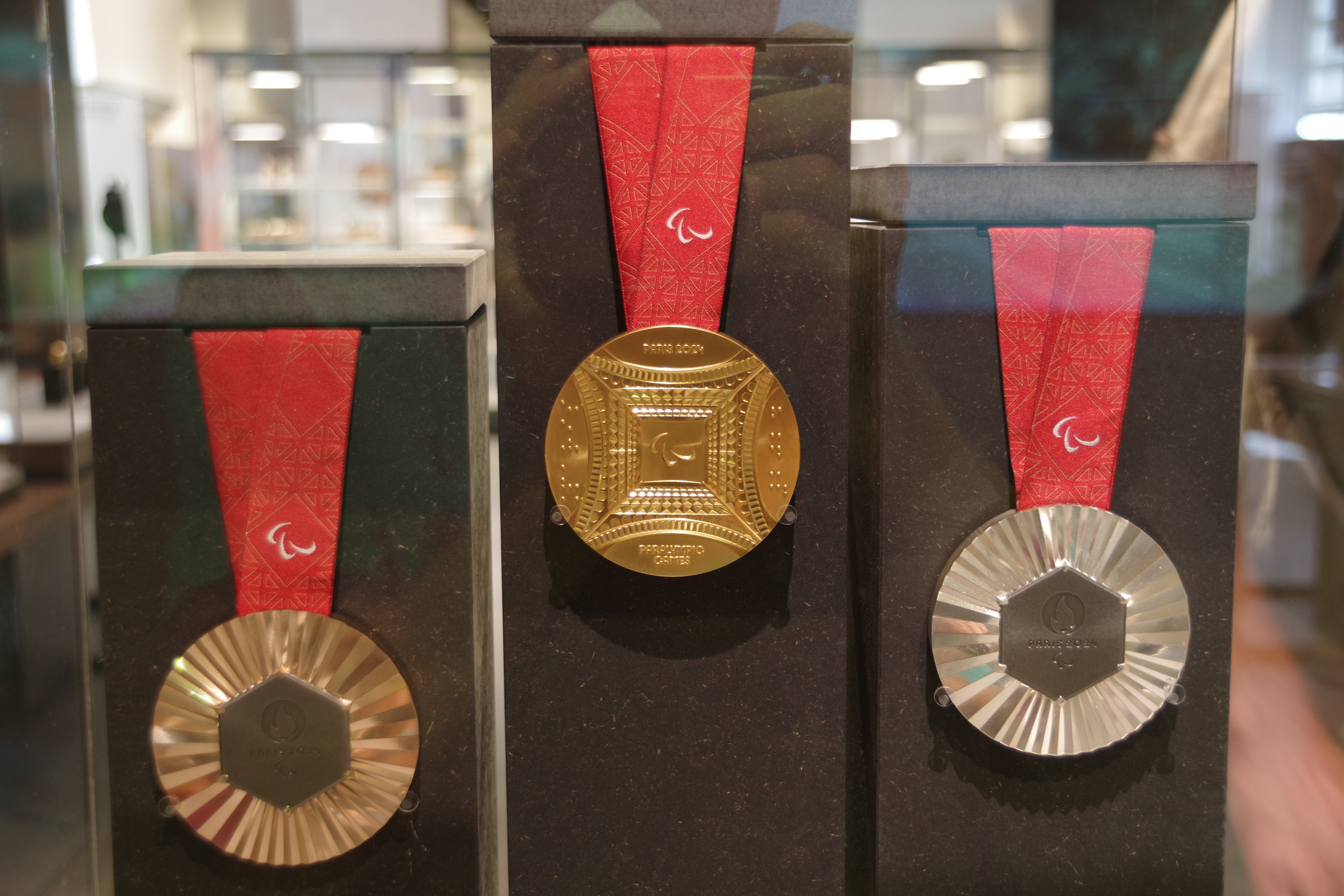
The Paralympics medals

The designs of medals for the 2024 Summer Olympics and Paralympics were unveiled on 8 February 2024; as with the Olympic medals, the front of the Paralympic medals features an embedded original piece of scrap iron from the Eiffel Tower in the shape of a hexagon, engraved with the Paris 2024 emblem. The obverse contains a design of the Eiffel Tower viewed from below, inscriptions in braille (a writing system whose development has been credited to French educator and inventor Louis Braille), and line patterns that can be used to identify the medals by touch.

=== Volunteers ===
In March 2023, applications to be volunteers at the Olympic and Paralympic Games were released. By May 2023, 300,000 applications had been received. Applicants were made aware of the status of their application in late 2023, of which 45,000 were expected to be assigned a volunteering position.

=== Transportation ===
Accessibility in the transportation network for riders with disabilities was a concern during the lead-up to the Games. Due to its age, less than 10% of the Paris Métro system is wheelchair-accessible, with only one of its sixteen lines (Line 14) being fully accessible. These shortcomings faced criticism from disability advocates and IPC president Andrew Parsons. Ahead of the Olympics and Paralympics, Paris invested €1.5 billion towards improving the accessibility of local businesses and other forms of transport, including €125 million to upgrade its bus fleet to accommodate passengers with wheelchairs, and subsidizing the purchase of wheelchair-accessible taxicabs by 1,000 operators.

=== Tickets ===
2.8 million tickets were offered in total. By the closing ceremony, 2.5 million tickets had been sold, surpassing London 2012 as both the most tickets ever sold at a single Paralympic Games, and the most tickets sold in total across the Summer Olympics and Paralympics. Several sports reported record attendance.

=== Torch relay ===
The torch relay began with the lighting of the Paralympic Heritage flame in Stoke Mandeville, United Kingdom, on 24 August. The next day, the torch arrived in France via the Channel Tunnel, thus beginning the torch relay. The torch was split into 12 parts and visited 12 different cities across France. The relay ended with the lighting of the Paralympic cauldron on 28 August.

== The Games ==
=== Opening ceremony ===
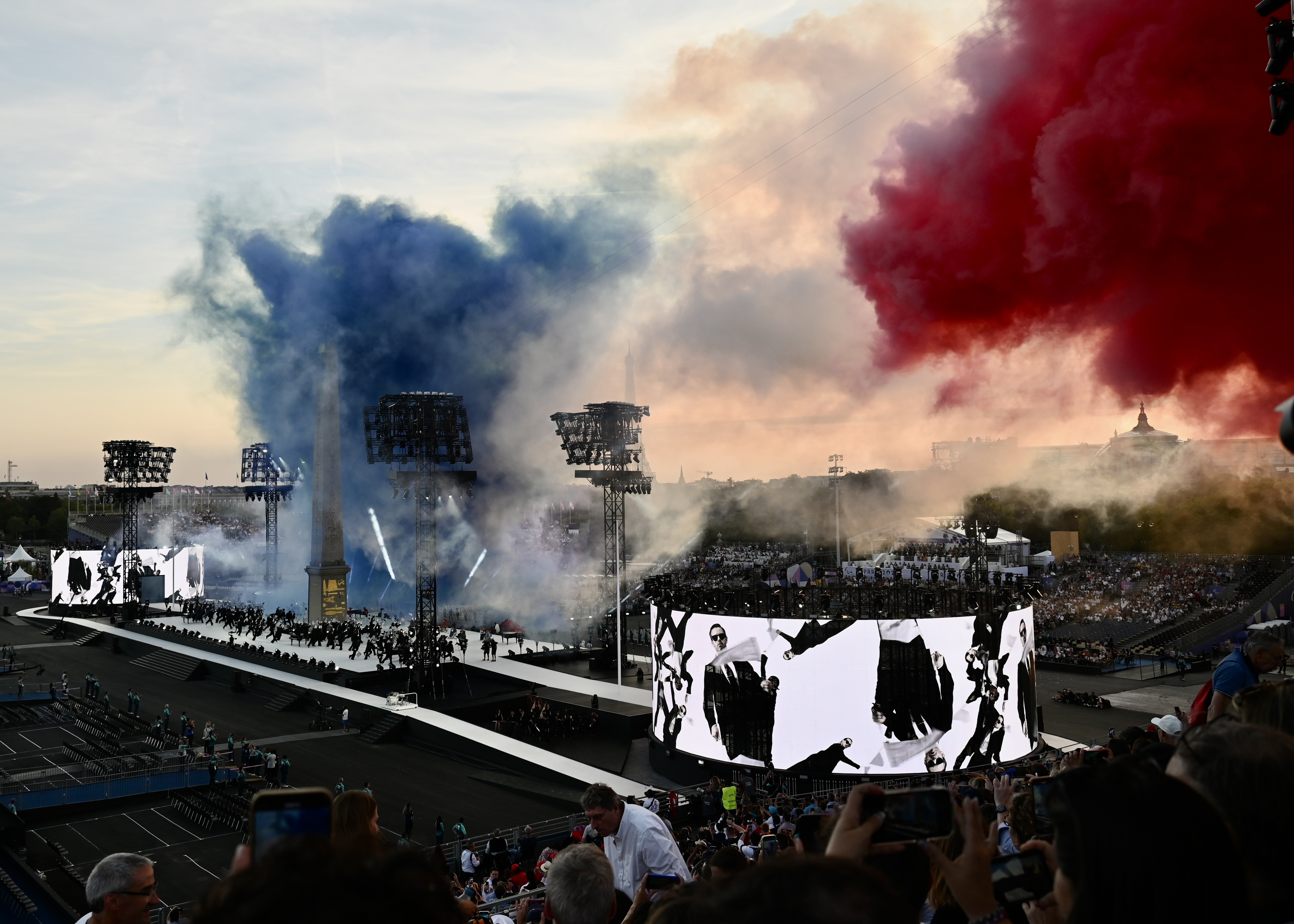
The opening ceremony at the Place de la Concorde

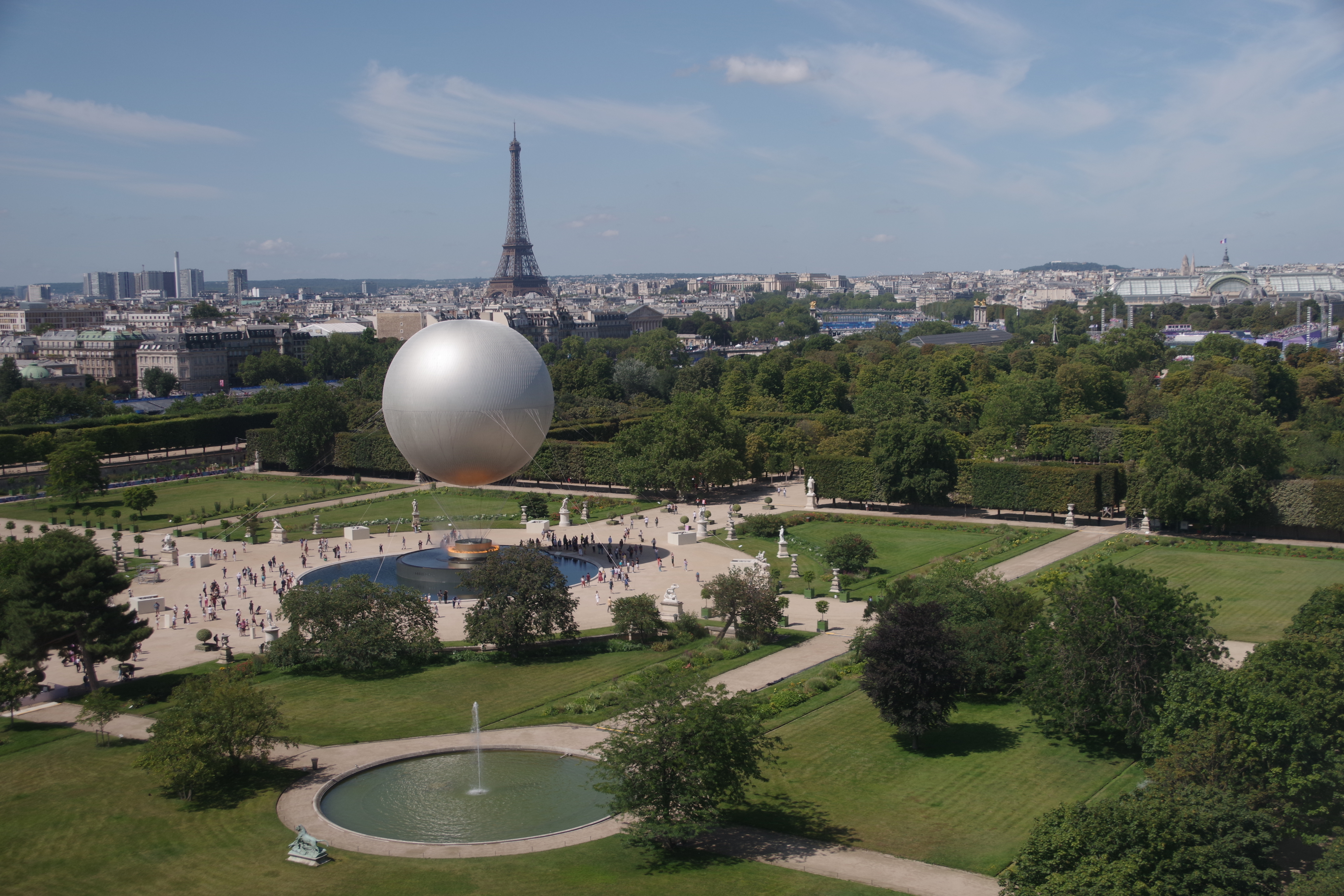
The Paralympic cauldron in the Tuileries Garden

The opening ceremony was held on 28 August 2024 at Place de la Concorde, the first Paralympic opening ceremony to take place outside of a stadium. Directed by Thomas Jolly and with choreography by Alexander Ekman, the ceremony was themed around the "human body and its paradoxes". The Parade of Nations took place on the Champs-Élysées starting at the Arc de Triomphe (where the Paralympic Agitos were erected), and ending at a temporary venue on the plaza.

The final leg culminated with multiple torchbearers coming together, who then lit the Paralympic cauldron, a ring of 40 computerised LEDs and 200 high-pressure water aerosol spray dispensers which was topped by a 30-metre-tall helium sphere resembling a hot air balloon, rising in the air, reminiscent of the Montgolfier brothers' experiments leading to the first hot air balloon flight in 1783. Performers included French singer Christine and the Queens. Dignitaries who attended the ceremony included British Prime Minister Keir Starmer, IOC President Thomas Bach, IPC President Andrew Parsons, and French President Emmanuel Macron, who opened the games.

=== Closing ceremony ===
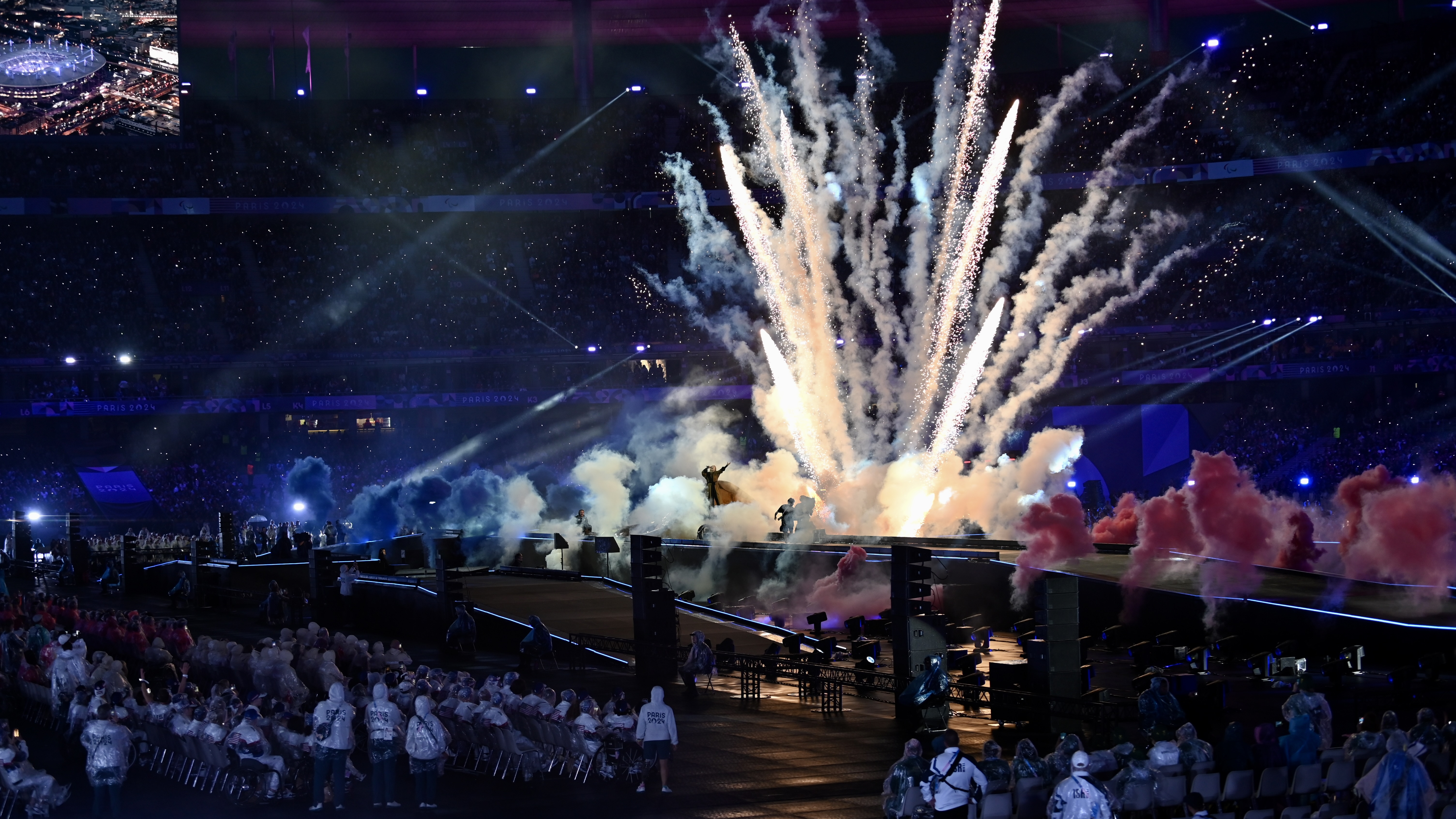
The closing ceremony of the Paralympics at the Stade de France

The closing ceremony took place at the Stade de France on 8 September 2024.

French composer Jean-Michel Jarre opened the festivities. A total of twenty-three other DJs performed, including Étienne de Crécy, Cassius, DJ Falcon and Alan Braxe.

Dignitaries included Paris mayor Anne Hidalgo, French president Emmanuel Macron, International Paralympic Committee president Andrew Parsons, and Los Angeles mayor Karen Bass.

Pandit Iman Das's raag Swarnadesi performed by visually impaired musicians at the closing ceremony.

=== Sports ===
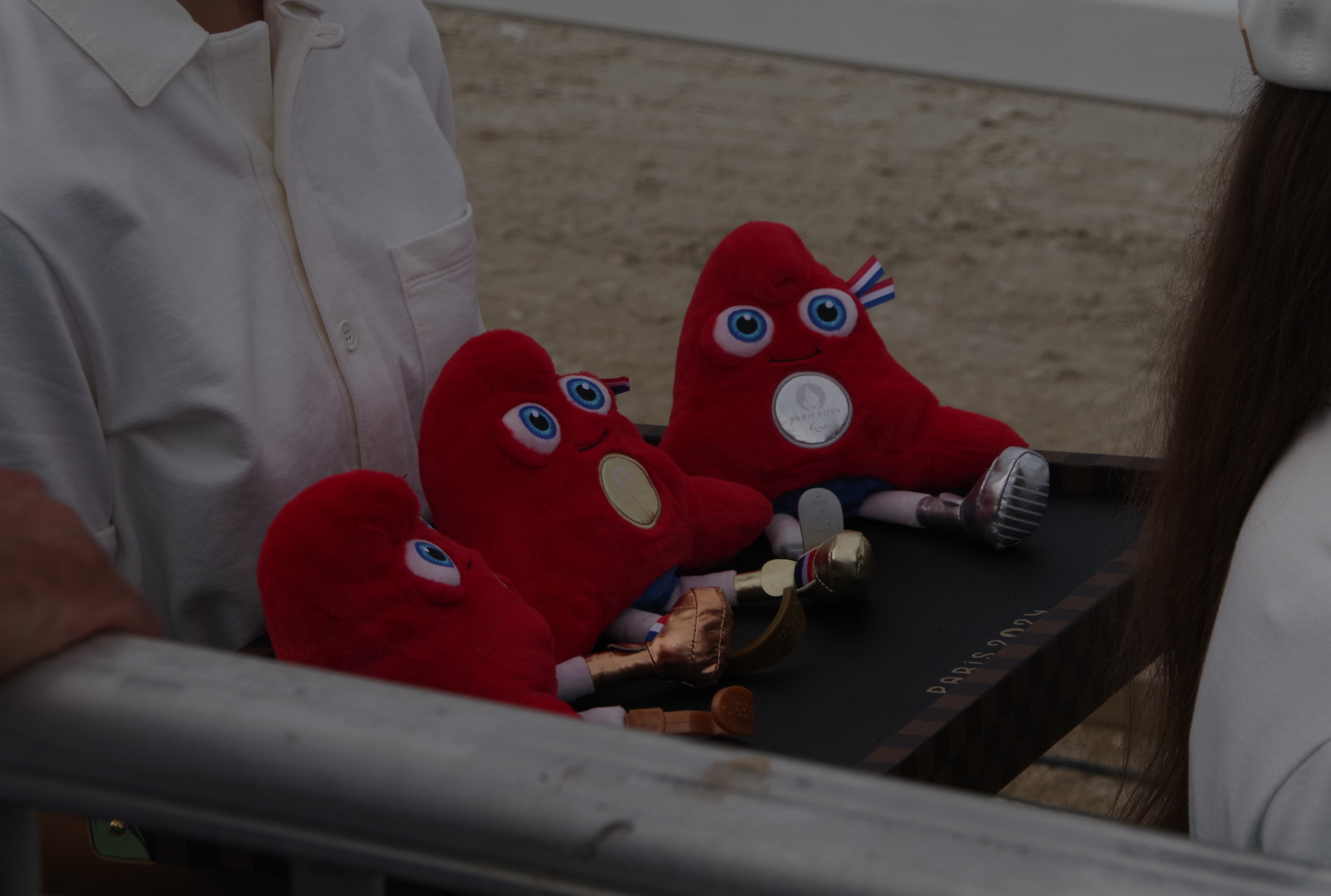
The Phryge plush given to medal winners

The programme for the 2024 Summer Paralympics was announced in January 2019, with no changes to the 22 sports from the 2020 Summer Paralympics. The first draft of the event schedule was released on 8 July 2022, with 549 events in 22 sports. A record 235 medal events will be women's events, an increase of eight over 2020; factoring these events and mixed/open events, the number of female participants in the Paralympics was projected to be at least double of that of Sydney 2000.

The IPC considered bids for golf, karate, para dance sport, and powerchair football to be added to the Paralympic programme as new sports. Bids were also made for CP football (football 7-a-side) and sailing—the two sports that had been dropped for 2020—to be reinstated. While CP football was selected for consideration by the IPC, it was rejected due to a lack of reach in women's participation.

In January 2021, the International Wheelchair Basketball Federation (IWBF) was declared non-competent by the IPC for violations of its Athlete Classification Code, and the sport was dropped from the Paris 2024 programme. On 22 September 2021, the IPC conditionally reinstated wheelchair basketball following reforms made by the IWBF, subject to compliance measures.

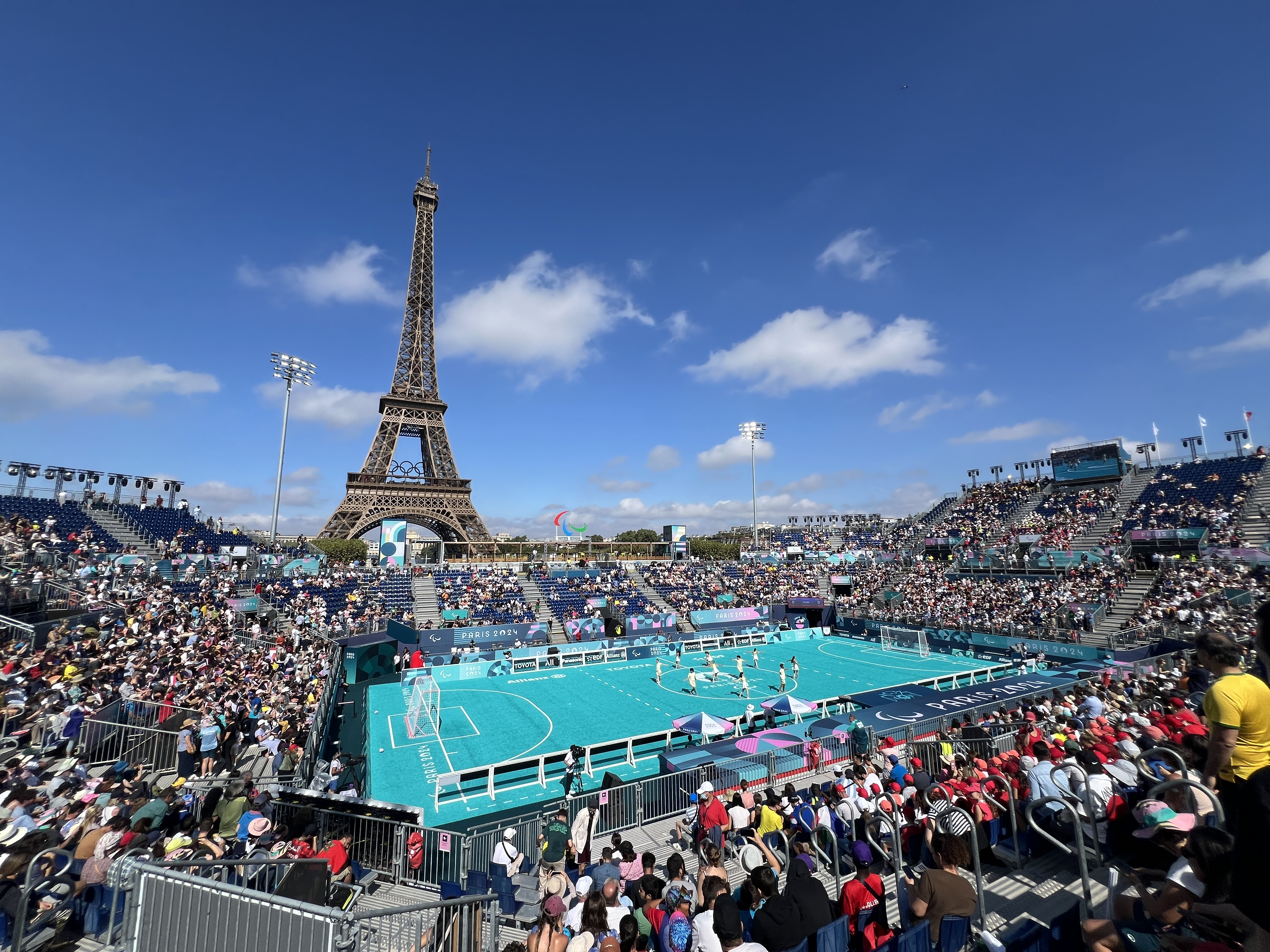
The Eiffel Tower Stadium, installed on the Champ-de-Mars during the Paralympics

- Archery (9)
- Athletics (164)
- Badminton (16)
- Blind football (1)
- Boccia (11)
- Canoe (10)
- Cycling (51)
  - Road (34)
  - Track (17)
- Equestrian (11)
- Goalball (2)
- Judo (16)
- Powerlifting (20)
- Rowing (5)
- Shooting (13)
- Sitting volleyball (2)
- Swimming (141)
- Table tennis (31)
- Taekwondo (10)
- Triathlon (11)
- Wheelchair basketball (2)
- Wheelchair fencing (16)
- Wheelchair rugby (1)
- Wheelchair tennis (6)

== Calendar ==
The International Paralympic Committee approved the final schedule, and dates for the Summer Paralympic Games were released on 2 February 2023.

All times and dates use Central European Summer Time (UTC+2)

OC	Opening ceremony	●	Event competitions	1	Gold medal events	CC	Closing ceremony

August/September 2024		August				September								Events
August/September 2024		28th Wed	29th Thu	30th Fri	31st Sat	1st Sun	2nd Mon	3rd Tue	4th Wed	5th Thu	6th Fri	7th Sat	8th Sun	Events
Ceremonies		OC											CC	—
Boccia			●	●	●	2	6	●	●	3				11
Blind football						●	●	●		●		1		1
Goalball			●	●	●	●	●	●	●	2				2
Para archery			●	●	2	2	2	1	1	1				9
Para athletics				14	18	19	13	24	15	19	16	22	4	164
Para badminton			●	●	●	2	14							16
Para canoe											●	5	5	10
Para cycling	Road								19	6	4	5		34
Para cycling	Track		4	5	4	4								17
Para equestrian								3	2		1	5		11
Para judo										5	5	6		16
Para powerlifting									4	4	4	4	4	20
Para rowing				●	●	5								5
Para swimming			15	14	15	14	13	15	12	13	15	15		141
Para table tennis			●	2	5	3	●	1	3	5	5	7		31
Para taekwondo			3	4	3									10
Para triathlon							11							11
Shooting para sport				3	2	2	1	2	2	1				13
Sitting volleyball			●	●	●	●	●	●	●	●	1	1		2
Wheelchair basketball			●	●	●	●	●	●	●	●	●	1	1	2
Wheelchair fencing								4	4	2	4	2		16
Wheelchair rugby			●	●	●	●	1							1
Wheelchair tennis				●	●	●	●	●	1	2	2	1		6
Daily medal events		0	22	42	49	53	61	50	63	63	57	75	14	549
Cumulative total		0	22	64	113	166	227	277	340	403	460	535	549	549
August/September 2024		August				September								Events
August/September 2024		28th Wed	29th Thu	30th Fri	31st Sat	1st Sun	2nd Mon	3rd Tue	4th Wed	5th Thu	6th Fri	7th Sat	8th Sun	Events

== Medal summary ==
* Host nation (France)

2024 Summer Paralympics medal table (Note: Although the IPC does not include Neutral Paralympic Athletes in the official medal tables, they are listed here for comparison purposes only.)
Rank	NPC	Gold	Silver	Bronze	Total
1	China	94	76	50	220
2	Great Britain	49	44	31	124
3	United States	36	42	27	105
4	Netherlands	27	17	12	56
–	Neutral Paralympic Athletes	26	22	23	71
5	Brazil	25	25	38	88
6	Italy	24	15	33	72
7	Ukraine	22	28	32	82
8	France*	19	28	28	75
9	Australia	18	17	27	62
10	Japan	14	10	17	41
11–85	Remaining NPCs	195	227	289	711
Totals (85 entries)		549	551	607	1,707

=== Podium Sweeps ===
Date	Sport	Event	Team	Gold	Silver	Bronze	Ref
3 September	Swimming	Men's 50 metre backstroke S5	China	Yuan Weiyi	Guo Jincheng	Wang Lichao	
3 September	Swimming	Women's 50 metre backstroke S5	China	Lu Dong	He Shenggao	Liu Yu	
5 September	Swimming	Men's 50 metre freestyle S5	China	Guo Jincheng	Yuan Weiyi	Wang Lichao	
6 September	Swimming	Men's 50 metre butterfly S5	China	Guo Jincheng	Yuan Weiyi	Wang Lichao	
6 September	Athletics	Women's 100m - T64	Netherlands	Fleur Jong	Kimberly Alkemade	Marlene van Gansewinkel	
7 September	Swimming	Women's 200m Individual Medley - SM5	China	He Shenggao	Lu Dong	Cheng Jiao	

== Participating National Paralympic Committees ==
Of the 183 existing National Paralympic Committees (NPC), 168 classified at least one athlete for the Summer Paralympic Games, which was a historic participation record. Three NPCs, Eritrea, Kiribati and Kosovo, made their Paralympic debuts at these Games. Nine NPCs returned to the Paralympics after a time of absence: Bangladesh (2008); the Solomon Islands and Vanuatu (2012); and East Timor, Macau, Myanmar, Suriname, Tonga, Trinidad and Tobago and Turkmenistan (2016). Of the 162 Paralympic Committees that sent their delegations to Tokyo in 2021, the Faroe Islands, Guyana, Madagascar and Tajikistan were not present.

Participating National Paralympic Committees
- Afghanistan (1)
- Algeria (26)
- Angola (2)
- Argentina (68)
- Armenia (3)
- Aruba (1)
- Australia (159)
- Austria (24)
- Azerbaijan (18)
- Bahrain (2)
- Bangladesh (2)
- Barbados (1)
- Belgium (29)
- Benin (2)
- Bermuda (2)
- Bhutan (1)
- Bosnia and Herzegovina (14)
- Botswana (2)
- Brazil (256)
- Bulgaria (3)
- Burkina Faso (1)
- Burundi (2)
- Cambodia (1)
- Cameroon (5)
- Canada (124)
- Cape Verde (2)
- Central African Republic (2)
- Chile (28)
- China (284)
- Colombia (74)
- Costa Rica (8)
- Croatia (22)
- Cuba (21)
- Cyprus (3)
- Czech Republic (32)
- Democratic Republic of the Congo (2)
- Denmark (32)
- Dominican Republic (11)
- Timor-Leste (1)
- Ecuador (14)
- Egypt (54)
- El Salvador (3)
- Eritrea (1)
- Estonia (5)
- Ethiopia (4)
- Fiji (3)
- Finland (16)
- France (239) (host)
- Gabon (2)
- The Gambia (2)
- Georgia (14)
- Germany (143)
- Ghana (4)
- Great Britain (201)
- Greece (37)
- Grenada (2)
- Guatemala (2)
- Guinea (2)
- Guinea-Bissau (2)
- Haiti (1)
- Honduras (1)
- Hong Kong (23)
- Hungary (39)
- Iceland (5)
- India (84)
- Indonesia (35)
- Iran (65)
- Iraq (20)
- Ireland (29)
- Israel (27)
- Italy (141)
- Ivory Coast (3)
- Jamaica (1)
- Japan (177)
- Jordan (8)
- Kazakhstan (44)
- Kenya (13)
- Kiribati (1)
- Kosovo (1)
- Kuwait (3)
- Kyrgyzstan (4)
- Laos (1)
- Latvia (8)
- Lebanon (1)
- Lesotho (2)
- Liberia (2)
- Libya (3)
- Lithuania (9)
- Luxembourg (2)
- Macau (1)
- Malawi (2)
- Malaysia (28)
- Maldives (2)
- Mali (2)
- Malta (2)
- Mauritius (6)
- Mexico (67)
- Moldova (5)
- Mongolia (12)
- Montenegro (4)
- Morocco (38)
- Mozambique (1)
- Myanmar (1)
- Namibia (5)
- Nepal (3)
- Netherlands (84)
- Neutral Paralympic Athletes (98)
- New Zealand (24)
- Nicaragua (1)
- Niger (1)
- Nigeria (23)
- North Macedonia (1)
- Norway (18)
- Oman (2)
- Pakistan (1)
- Palestine (1)
- Panama (3)
- Papua New Guinea (2)
- Paraguay (1)
- Peru (13)
- Philippines (6)
- Poland (84)
- Portugal (27)
- Puerto Rico (2)
- Qatar (2)
- Refugee Paralympic Team (8)
- Republic of the Congo (2)
- Romania (6)
- Rwanda (12)
- Saint Vincent and the Grenadines (1)
- São Tomé and Príncipe (1)
- Saudi Arabia (9)
- Senegal (4)
- Serbia (23)
- Sierra Leone (1)
- Singapore (10)
- Slovakia (26)
- Slovenia (14)
- Solomon Islands (4)
- Somalia (1)
- South Africa (32)
- South Korea (83)
- Spain (139)
- Sri Lanka (8)
- Suriname (1)
- Sweden (20)
- Switzerland (27)
- Syria (1)
- Chinese Taipei (13)
- Tanzania (1)
- Thailand (78)
- Togo (1)
- Tonga (1)
- Trinidad and Tobago (1)
- Tunisia (30)
- Turkey (93)
- Turkmenistan (1)
- Uganda (4)
- Ukraine (74)
- United Arab Emirates (13)
- United States (220)
- Uruguay (2)
- Uzbekistan (65)
- Vanuatu (2)
- Venezuela (25)
- Vietnam (7)
- Virgin Islands (1)
- Yemen (1)
- Zambia (2)
- Zimbabwe (2)

Number of athletes by National Paralympic Committee

As of 27 August 2024

Ranking	NPC	Athletes
1	China	284
2	Brazil	256
3	France	239
4	United States	220
5	Great Britain	201
6	Japan	177
7	Australia	159
8	Germany	143
9	Italy	141
10	Spain	139
11	Canada	125
12	Neutral Paralympic Athletes	98
13	Turkey	93
14	India	84
14	Netherlands	84
14	Poland	84
17	South Korea	83
18	Thailand	78
19	Colombia	74
19	Ukraine	74
21	Argentina	68
22	Mexico	67
23	Iran	65
23	Uzbekistan	65
25	Egypt	54
26	Kazakhstan	44
27	Hungary	39
28	Morocco	38
29	Greece	37
30	Indonesia	35
31	Czech Republic	32
31	Denmark	32
31	South Africa	32
34	Tunisia	30
35	Belgium	29
35	Ireland	29
37	Chile	28
37	Malaysia	28
39	Israel	27
39	Portugal	27
39	Switzerland	27
42	Algeria	26
42	Slovakia	26
44	New Zealand	25
44	Venezuela	25
46	Austria	24
47	Hong Kong	23
47	Nigeria	23
47	Serbia	23
50	Croatia	22
51	Cuba	21
52	Iraq	20
52	Sweden	20
54	Azerbaijan	18
54	Norway	18
56	Finland	16
57	Bosnia and Herzegovina	14
57	Ecuador	14
57	Georgia	14
57	Slovenia	14
61	Kenya	13
61	Peru	13
61	Rwanda	13
61	Chinese Taipei	13
61	United Arab Emirates	13
66	Mongolia	12
67	Dominican Republic	11
68	Singapore	10
69	Lithuania	9
69	Saudi Arabia	9
71	Costa Rica	8
71	Jordan	8
71	Latvia	8
71	Refugee Paralympic Team	8
71	Sri Lanka	8
76	Vietnam	7
77	Mauritius	6
77	Philippines	6
77	Romania	6
80	Cameroon	5
80	Estonia	5
80	Iceland	5
80	Moldova	5
80	Namibia	5
85	Ethiopia	4
85	Ghana	4
85	Kyrgyzstan	4
85	Montenegro	4
85	Senegal	4
85	Solomon Islands	4
85	Uganda	4
92	Armenia	3
92	Bulgaria	3
92	Cape Verde	3
92	Cyprus	3
92	El Salvador	3
92	Fiji	3
92	Ivory Coast	3
92	Kuwait	3
92	Libya	3
92	Nepal	3
92	Panama	3
103	Angola	2
103	Bahrain	2
103	Bangladesh	2
103	Benin	2
103	Bermuda	2
103	Botswana	2
103	Burundi	2
103	Central African Republic	2
103	Democratic Republic of the Congo	2
103	Gabon	2
103	The Gambia	2
103	Grenada	2
103	Guatemala	2
103	Guinea	2
103	Guinea-Bissau	2
103	Lesotho	2
103	Liberia	2
103	Luxembourg	2
103	Malawi	2
103	Maldives	2
103	Mali	2
103	Malta	2
103	Oman	2
103	Papua New Guinea	2
103	Puerto Rico	2
103	Qatar	2
103	Republic of the Congo	2
103	Uruguay	2
103	Vanuatu	2
103	Zambia	2
103	Zimbabwe	2
134	Afghanistan	1
134	Aruba	1
134	Barbados	1
134	Bhutan	1
134	Burkina Faso	1
134	Cambodia	1
134	Timor-Leste	1
134	Eritrea	1
134	Haiti	1
134	Honduras	1
134	Jamaica	1
134	Kiribati	1
134	Kosovo	1
134	Laos	1
134	Lebanon	1
134	Macau	1
134	Mozambique	1
134	Myanmar	1
134	Nicaragua	1
134	Niger	1
134	North Macedonia	1
134	Pakistan	1
134	Palestine	1
134	Paraguay	1
134	Saint Vincent and the Grenadines	1
134	São Tomé and Príncipe	1
134	Sierra Leone	1
134	Somalia	1
134	Suriname	1
134	Syria	1
134	Tanzania	1
134	Togo	1
134	Tonga	1
134	Trinidad and Tobago	1
134	Turkmenistan	1
134	Virgin Islands	1
134	Yemen	1

== Marketing ==
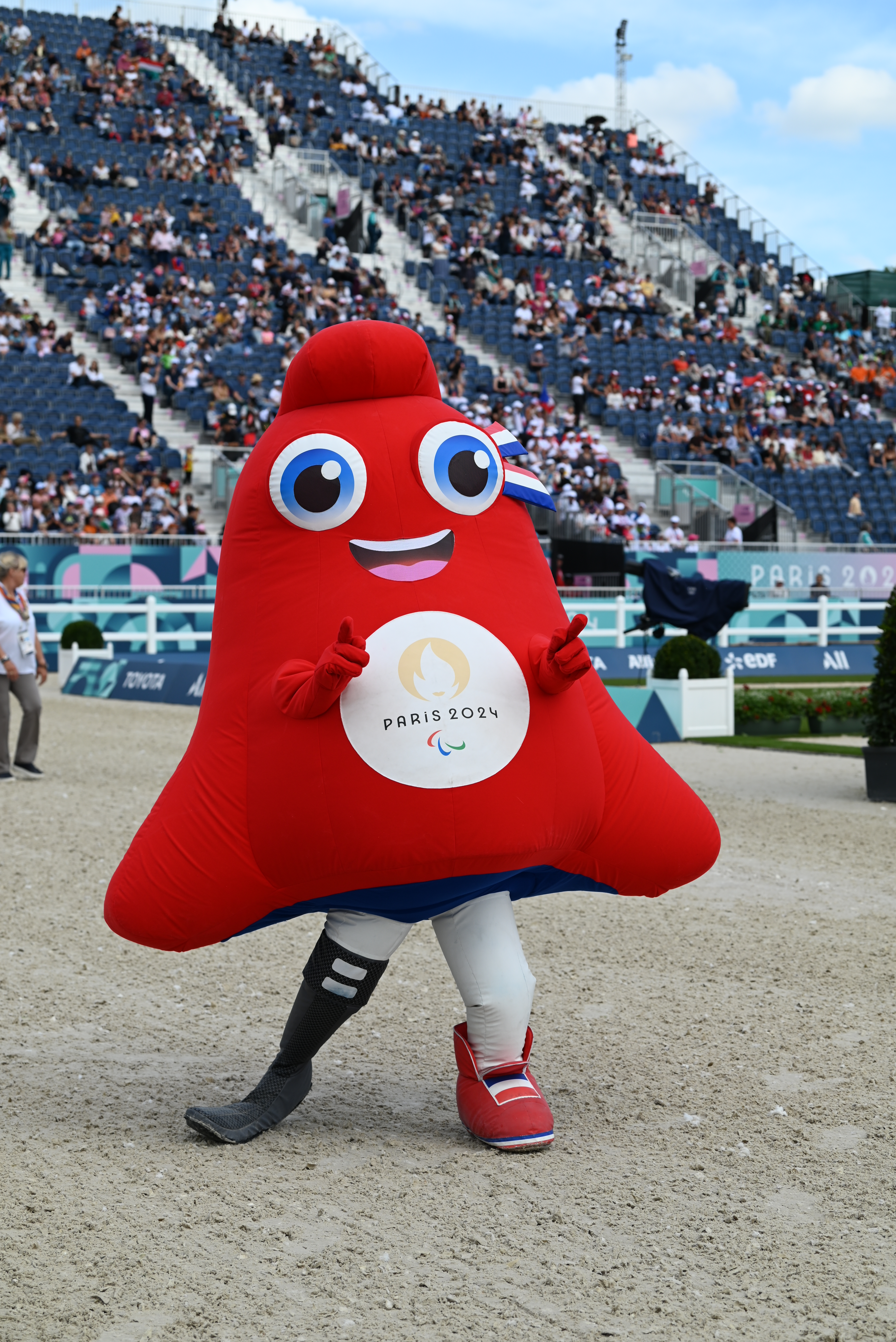
The Paralympic Phryge

=== Emblem and branding ===
The emblem for the 2024 Summer Olympics and Paralympics (a stylized rendition of Marianne) was unveiled on 21 October 2019 at the Grand Rex. For the first time, the Paralympic Games shared the same emblem as their corresponding Olympics, with no difference or variation. Paris 2024 president Tony Estanguet stated that the decision was intended to reflect the two events sharing a single "ambition", explaining that "in terms of legacy we believe that in this country we need to strengthen the place of sport in the daily life of the people, and whatever the age, whatever the disability or not, you have a place and a role to play in the success of Paris 2024".

The official posters for these Olympics and Paralympics by Ugo Gattoni (which features a stylized Paris landscape with themed depictions of its landmarks and venues) were also designed as a single piece, split in halves representing each event.

=== Mascots ===
The mascots of Paris 2024, The Phryges, were unveiled on 14 November 2022. They are a pair of anthrophomorphic Phrygian caps, which have been regarded as a historical symbol of liberty and freedom in France. The Phryge representing the Paralympics wears a running blade on one of its legs, marking the first time since 1994 that a Paralympic mascot has been depicted with a visible disability.

== Broadcasting rights ==
For the first time, host broadcaster Olympic Broadcasting Services (OBS) provided live telecasts for all 22 Paralympic sports—an increase from 19 in Tokyo. The French national public television broadcaster France Télévisions acquired rights to the 2024 Summer Paralympics, airing mainly on France 2, France 3, and France.tv. On 28 August 2020, Channel 4 renewed its rights to the Paralympics in the United Kingdom through 2024; coverage was broadcast on Channel 4 television, streaming, and Channel 4 Sport channels on YouTube. Channel 4 notably hired actress Rose Ayling-Ellis as a presenter, with the broadcaster stating that she would be the first deaf person to serve as a correspondent on a live sports broadcast.

CBC Sports renewed its Canadian rights to the Paralympics for 2024 and 2026, in partnership with the Canadian Paralympic Committee. Long-time CBC Sports presenter Scott Russell retired from broadcasting after the conclusion of the Games; Russell had covered 16 Olympic Games and hosted six during his 40-year career. In the United States, NBC Sports planned a major expansion of its coverage, including extending digital features from the Olympics on Peacock such as the "Gold Zone" whiparound show, and multi-view, to the Paralympics.

Infront Sports & Media sub-licensed rights to free-to-air, pay television, and digital broadcasters across 46 European territories, including several (Bosnia and Herzegovina, Georgia, Lithuania, and Malta) where the Paralympics had not been televised. In Spain, alongside RTVE, coverage was also streamed on Twitch via Siro López. In the over 175 countries where broadcast rights had not been sold, the Games were streamed on YouTube via a partnership with the IPC, including event coverage, highlights and YouTube Shorts content, as well as multi-view support.

== See also ==
- 2024 Summer Olympics
- Other Paralympics celebrated in France:
  - 1992 Winter Paralympics
  - 2030 Winter Paralympics

== Notes ==
Preceded by Tokyo 2020	Summer Paralympics; Paris; XVII Paralympic Summer Games (2024)	Succeeded by Los Angeles 2028
