= 2024 Summer Paralympics torch relay =

XVII Paralympic Games
- Host city: Paris, France
- Countries visited: Great Britain, France
- Torchbearers: 1000
- Start date: 24 August 2024
- End date: 28 August 2024

The 2024 Summer Paralympics torch relay was held from 24 to 28 August 2024. The torch relay began with the lighting of the Paralympic Heritage flame in Stoke Mandeville, United Kingdom, on 24 August. The next day, the torch arrived in France via the Channel Tunnel, thus beginning the torch relay. The torch was split into 12 parts and visited 12 different cities across France. The French leg ended during the opening ceremony when it was used to light the Paralympic cauldron. The cauldron was erected at the Tuileries Garden's central fountain. In total, the relay visited 50 cities and had 1000 torch bearers.

== Route ==
- 24 August: Great Britain
  - The flame was lit in Stoke Mandeville, United Kingdom

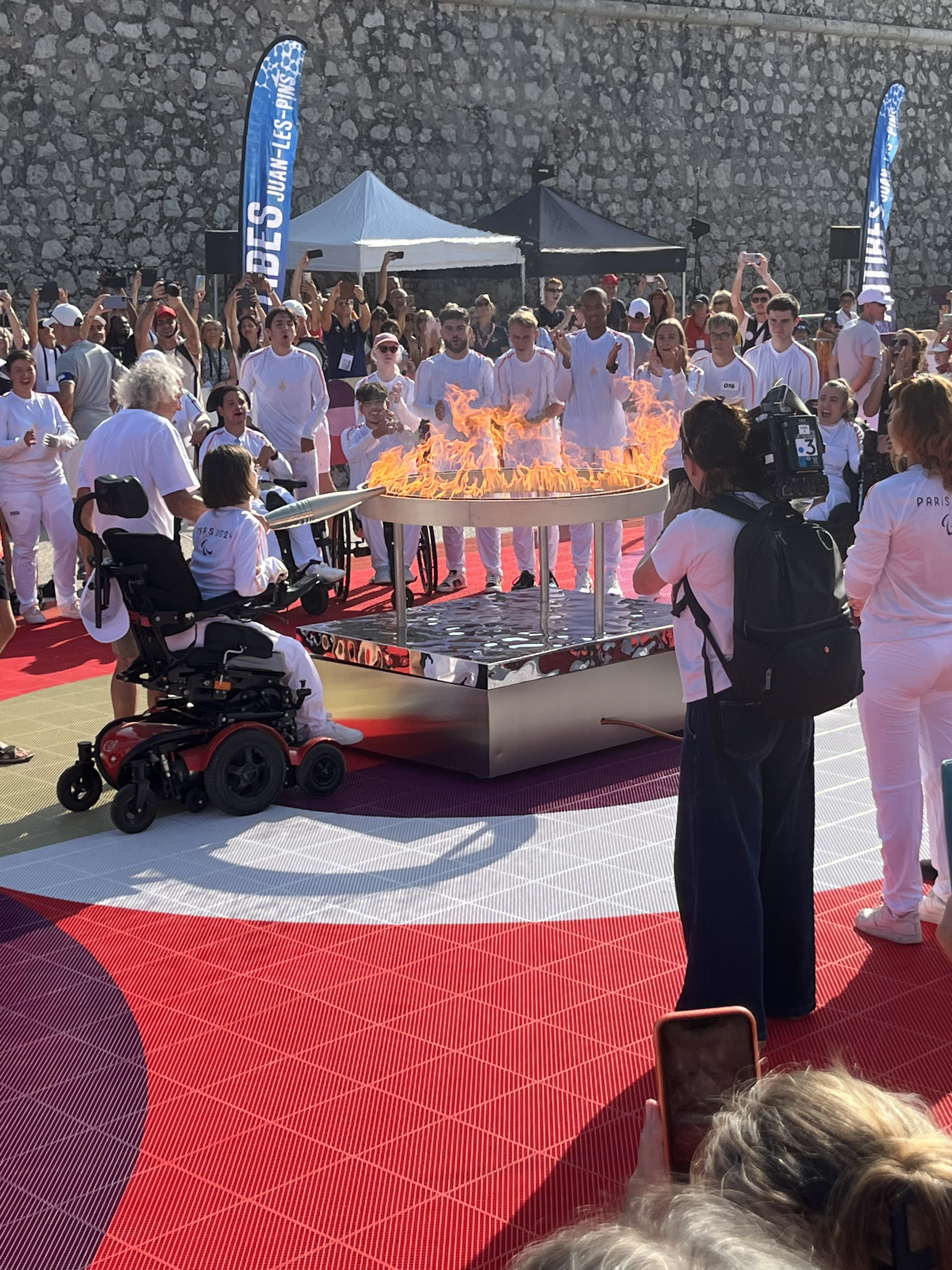
Antibes Juan-les-Pins

- 25 August: Across France
  - Channel Tunnel
  - Calais, Pas-de-Calais
  - Valenciennes, Nord department
  - Amnéville, Moselle
  - Strasbourg, European Collectivity of Alsace
  - Thonon-les-Bains, Haute-Savoie
  - Antibes Juan-les-Pins, Alpes-Maritimes region of France
  - Montpellier
  - Lourdes, in the Hautes-Pyrénées region of France
  - La Roche-sur-Yon, Vendée
  - Lorient, Morbihan
  - Saint-Malo, Ille-et-Vilaine
  - Rouen, Seine-Maritime

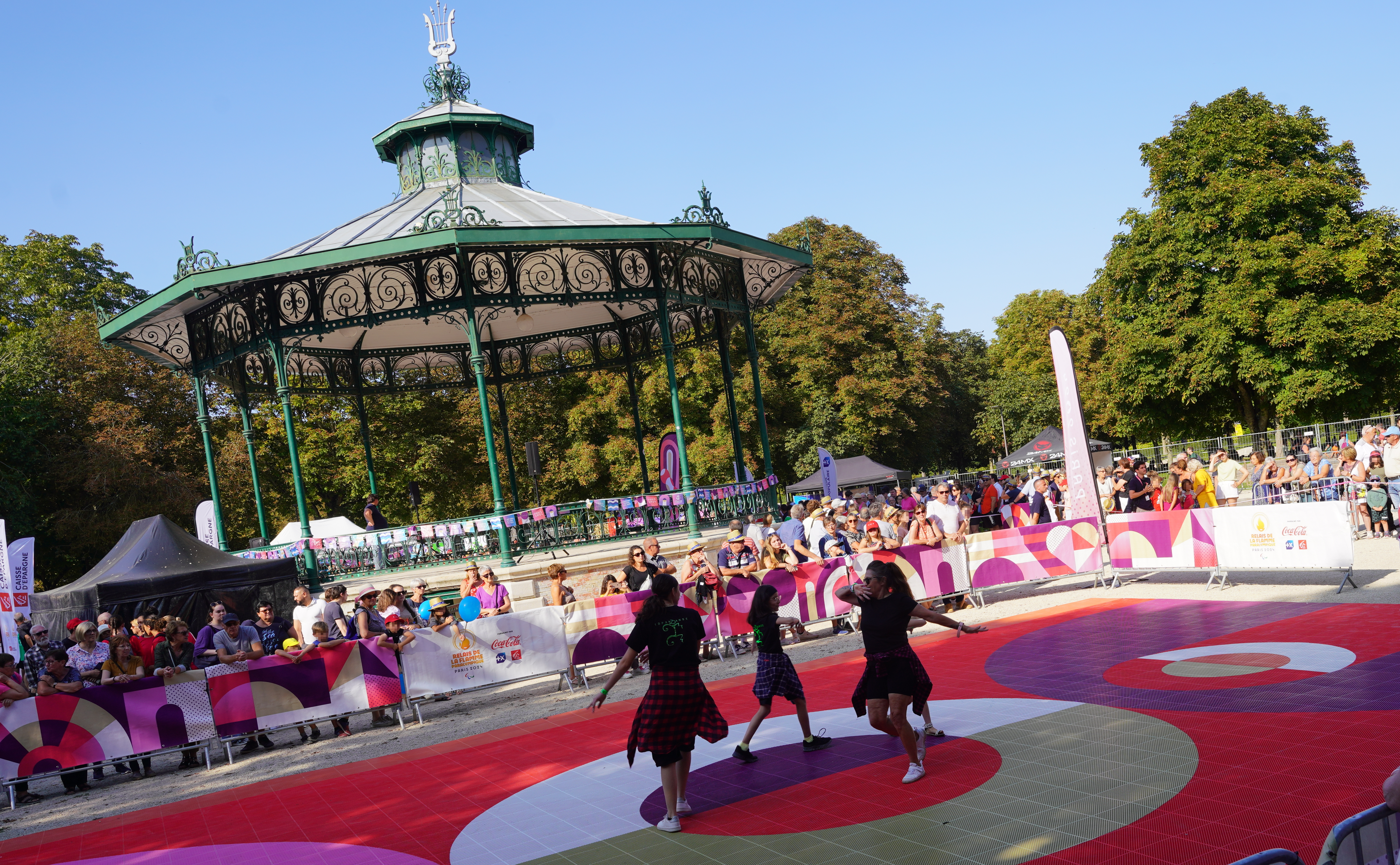
Châlons-en-Champagne

- 26 August: Across France
  - Arras (Pas-de-Calais)
  - Amiens (Somme)
  - Chambly (Oise)
  - Laon (Aisne)
  - Châlons-en-Champagne (Marne)
  - Troyes (Aube)
  - Châtillon-sur-Seine (Côte d’Or)
  - Lyon
  - Vichy
  - Limoges
  - Blois (Loir-et-Cher)
  - Chartres
  - Deauville (Calvados)
  - Louviers (Eure)
- 27 August: Across Île-de-France
  - Montfermeil
  - Clichy-sous-Bois
  - Livry-Gargan
  - Sevran (Seine-Saint-Denis)
  - Épinay-sur-Seine
  - Villetaneuse (Hauts-de-Seine)
  - Louvres (Val d’Oise)
  - Trilport (Seine-et-Marne)
  - Sucy-en-Brie (Val-de-Marne)
  - Valenton (Val-de-Marne)
  - CNSD de Fontainebleau (Seine-et-Marne)
  - Garches Vaucresson (Hauts-de-Seine)
  - Cergy (Val d’Oise)
  - Saint-Quentin-en-Yvelines (Yvelines) and Grigny (Essonne)
  - Domaine national de Saint-Cloud (Hauts-de-Seine)
  - La Roche-Guyon (Val d’Oise)
  - Houdan (Yvelines)
- 28 August: Across Paris
  - Insep
  - La Cipale
  - Passerelle Simone de Beauvoir
  - Murs des Fédérés
  - Place de la Réunion
  - Club France
  - Place des Fêtes
  - Place Pigalle
  - Grange aux Belles
  - Parc Montsouris
  - Manufacture Nationale des Gobelins
  - Arènes de Lutèce
  - Place Saint-Sulpice
  - Cité des Périchaux
  - Mairie du 15e arrondissement
  - UNESCO rue Masseran
  - Lac Inférieur du Bois de Boulogne
  - Avenue de la Grande Armée
  - Parc Moneceau
  - Parc de Clichy Batignolles Martin Luther King
  - Square Léon
  - Nation
  - République
  - Bastille
  - Hôtel de Ville
  - Carreau du Temple
  - Place du Châtelet
  - Place de la Concorde (Part of opening ceremony)
  - Tuileries Garden's central garden (Part of opening ceremony)

== Relay torch design ==
The French Olympic Committee commissioned Mathieu Lehanneur (fr) (born 1974), to design the cauldron, torch, and ceremonial cauldrons along the torch relay route: Lehanneur developed a concept of having these three items symbolise France's national motto, "Liberté, égalité, fraternité" ("Liberty, equality, fraternity"), and gold, silver, and bronze medals respectively. Lehanneur described them as "three chapters in the same story", with the cauldron representing liberty, medals, and serving as "the epilogue and the ultimate symbol of that story. Light, magical and unifying." The torch relay cauldrons – 2000 of them – don a wave and ripple design that represents water texture of the River Seine that runs through Paris. They were made of XCarb by ArcelorMittal, a Paris 2024 Olympics Official Partner.

== Bibliography ==
=== References ===
- Castañeda, Kissa (29 July 2024). "Paris Olympic Torch And Cauldron: The Story Behind The Unique Design". Forbes. Retrieved 3 September 2024. ISSN 0015-6914; OCLC 6465733 (all editions).
- Coady-Stemp, Emily (25 August 2024). "Paralympic Games Torch Relay Goes via Channel Tunnel at Folkestone". Archived from the original on 29 August 2024.
- Katsikopoulou, Myrto (29 August 2024). "Mathieu Lehanneur's Balloon-Shaped Cauldron Rises to Celebrate the Paralympics' Opening". Designboom. Retrieved 3 September 2024.
- Lee, Eleanor (28 July 2024). "Innovative Flying Olympic Flame Takes Centre Stage". Paris 2024.
- Nedelcheva, Kalina (26 July 2024). "Slick Steel Torches: Mathieu Lehanneur Unveils the 2024 Olympic and Paralympic Torches". TrendHunter.com. Toronto: Trend Hunter Inc., founded by Jeremy Gutsche.
- Pagliacolo, Elizabeth (8 August 2024). "Q&A: Mathieu Lehanneur and the Power of Olympic Symbols". Azure.
- Paris 2024 (n.d.). "Paralympic Torch Relay Route". COJOP (Paris 2024 Comité d'Organisation des Jeux Olympiques et Paralympiques). Archived from the original on 17 August 2024.
- Paris 2024 (24 August 2024). "Paris 2024: Paralympic Flame Created at Stoke Mandeville". COJOP (Paris 2024 Comité d'Organisation des Jeux Olympiques et Paralympiques). Archived from the original on 29 August 2024.
- Surprenant, Alexandra (29 July 2024). "Liberté, éGalité, Fraternité: French Designer Mathieu Lehanneur Designs the Cauldron and Torch at the Paris Olympics Opening Ceremony". The Architect's Newspaper.
  Surprenant, as of the date of this article, was a rising senior (class of 2025) at Dartmouth College where she also writes for The Dartmouth.
