= 2024 Summer Paralympics opening ceremony =

Opening ceremony of the 2024 Summer Paralympics

- Part of 2024 Summer Paralympics
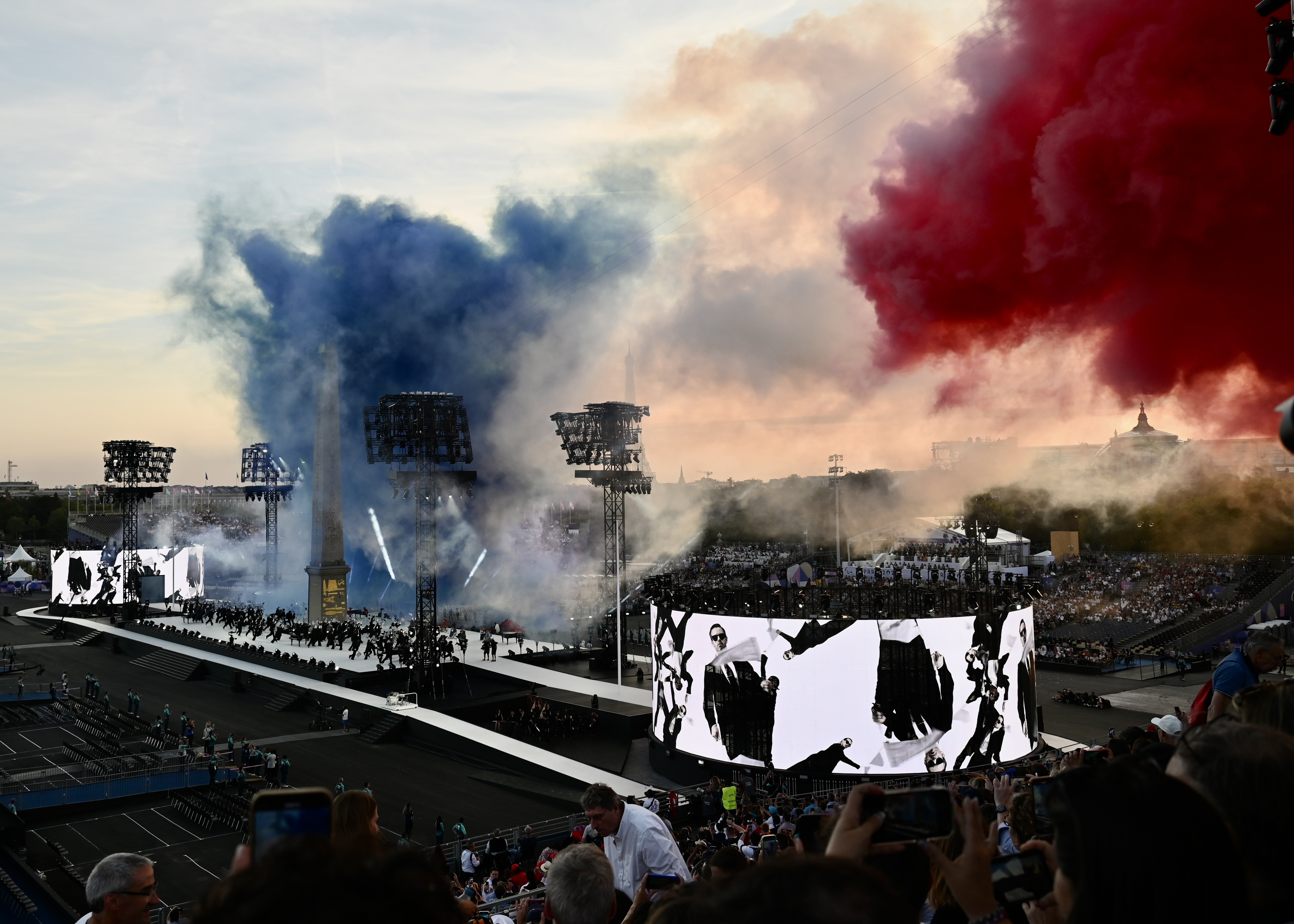
- Coloured smoke in the colours of the French flag during the Paralympics opening ceremony at Place de la Concorde.
- Date: 28 August 2024
- Time: 20:00 – 23:00 CEST (UTC+2)
- Venue: Place de la Concorde
- Location: Paris, France
- Also known as: Paradox: From Discord to Concord
- Filmed by: Olympic Broadcasting Services (OBS)
- Footage: The ceremony on the IPC YouTube channel on YouTube

The opening ceremony of the 2024 Summer Paralympics took place on the evening of 28 August 2024 at the Place de la Concorde in Paris. It was the first time that a Summer Paralympic Games opening ceremony was held outside of a stadium. Like the 2024 Summer Olympics opening ceremony, this event was directed by Alexander Ekman and Thomas Jolly. The ceremony was themed around the human body and "history and its paradoxes", and featured more than 500 dancers and performers. Unlike the Olympics opening ceremony, which took place mostly under rain, the weather was clear and sunny with a view of sunset during the ceremony.

The Parade of Nations took place on the Champs-Élysées starting at the Rond-point des Champs-Élysées, and ending at Place de la Concorde. The final leg culminated with multiple torch bearers coming together, who then lit the Paralympic cauldron, a ring of 40 computerised LEDs and 200 high-pressure water aerosol spray dispensers which was topped by a 30-metre-tall helium sphere resembling a hot air balloon, rising in the air, reminiscent of the Montgolfier brothers' experiments leading to the first hot air balloon flight in 1783. Performers included French singer Christine and the Queens.

== Preparations ==
The opening ceremony of the 2024 Summer Paralympics took place on the evening of 28 August 2024 at the Place de la Concorde in Paris. It was the first time that a Paralympic Games opening ceremony had been held outside of a stadium. The venue was already equipped with temporary stands installed a few weeks earlier for the Olympic skateboarding, breakdancing, BMX freestyle and 3X3 basketball events. Seating was provided for 35,000 paying and accredited spectators. Another 30,000 spectators could view the parade to the Place de la Concorde for free from along the Champs-Elysées. This was the first time in the Paralympics since the 2018 Winter Paralympics to allow international spectators following the end of the COVID-19 pandemic, after the last two Paralympics were held behind closed doors due to the pandemic.

Unlike the Olympic opening ceremony, which took place in cold weather and mostly in the rain, the skies were clear, with a view of a colourful sunset during the ceremony. It was warm, at 30°C, and somewhat humid. The stage consisted of two runways flanking the Luxor Obelisk. At the end of each were huge cylindrical video screens. The ceremony involved 500 performers. There were 1,100 accredited media present, and the event was viewed by an estimated television audience of 300 million. Security was provided by 15,000 personnel. The ceremony was themed around the human body and "history and its paradoxes", and was titled "Paradox: Form Discord to Concord". Each artistic sequence was built around the theme of working together to create a better and more inclusive society.

== Producers ==
- Artistic director: Thomas Jolly
- Music director: Victor Le Masne
- Choreographer and Artistic Director:
  - Alexander Ekman
- Scenography: Bruno Delavenère
- Costume designer: Louis-Gabriel Nouchi
- Lighting creation: Thomas Dechandon

== Proceedings ==
=== Welcome to Paris ===
The ceremony opened with a video featuring Théo Curin, a French Paralympic swimmer and a member of the Athletes' Commission of the Paris Organising Committee for the 2024 Olympic and Paralympic Games. Curin was the host of a show called "Théo Le Taxi" on France Télévisions, the official broadcaster of the 2024 Paralympic Games. For the opening ceremony, he arrived in a taxi provided by Toyota, one of the Games' sponsors, and decorated with hundreds of toy Phryges, the Games' ubiquitous mascot.

=== Official Introduction ===
The President of France, Emmanuel Macron, and the President of the International Paralympic Committee, Andrew Parsons, were introduced.

=== Discord ===
The Canadian pianist Chilly Gonzales opened the sequence with a piano performance. He was joined by 140 dancers in suits representing the "Strict Society", whose costumes symbolized rigidity, and 16 performers with disabilities representing the "Creative Gang", whose costumes symbolized freedom. The Creative Gang included Chelsie Hill, a founder of the Rollettes wheelchair dance team, and Israeli Para dancing champion Tomer Margalit and her dance partner Orel Chalaf.

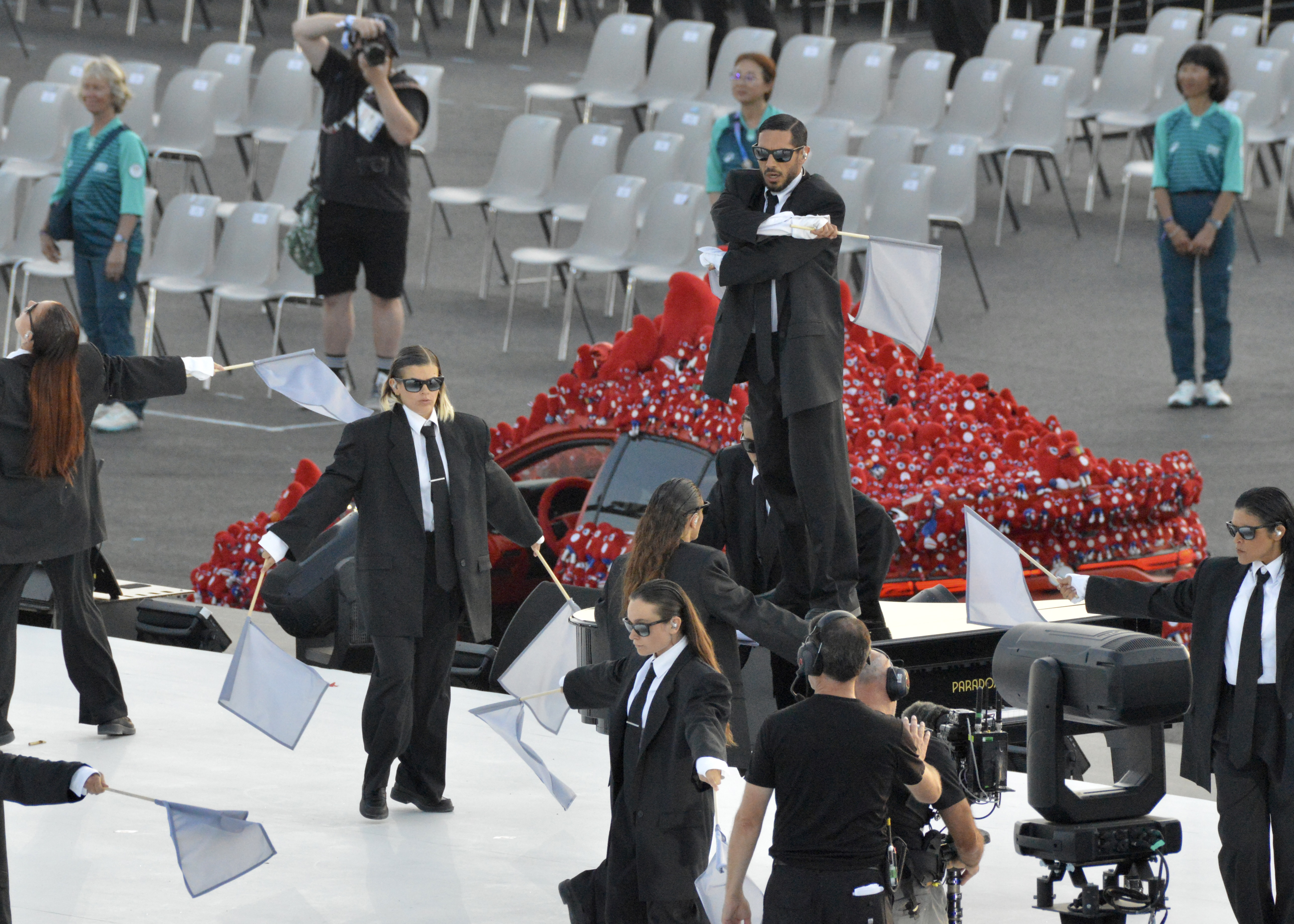
"Strict Society" dancers perform before a Toyota taxi decorated with toy Phryges

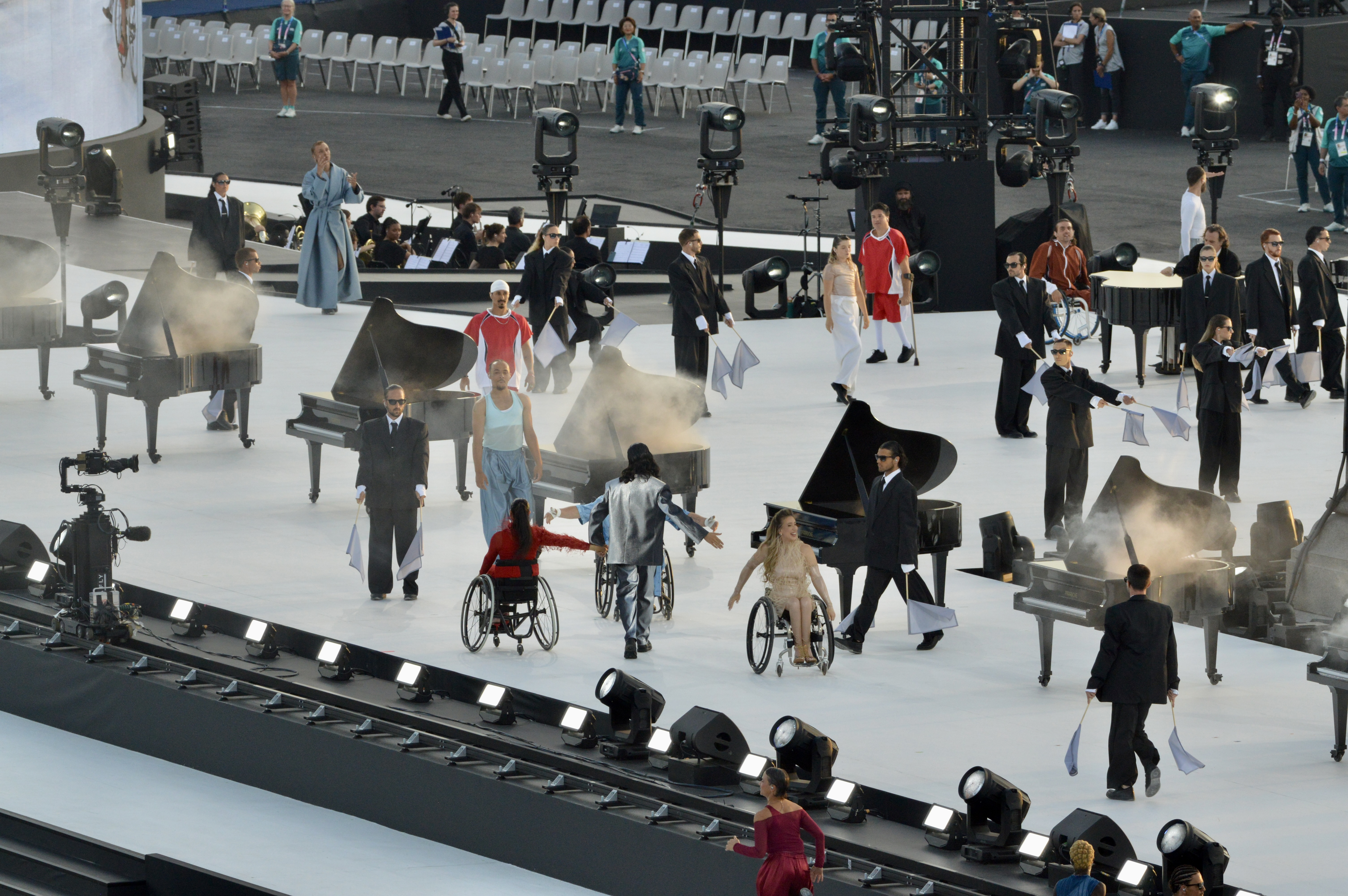
"Strict Society" and "Creative Gang" dancers with Chelsie Hill (in wheelchair)

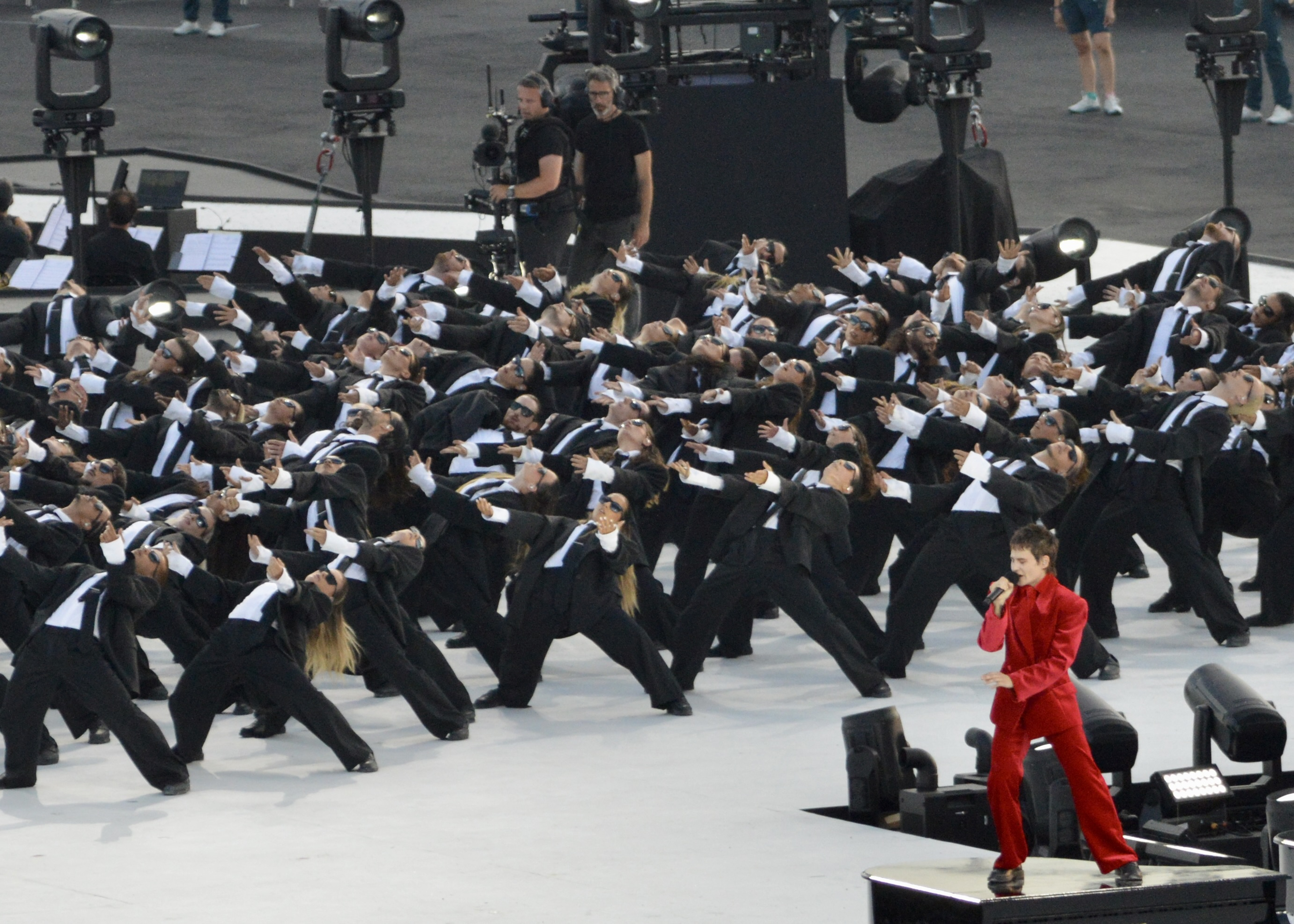
"Strict Society" dancers

The interactions between both groups on stage was meant as a representation of the paradoxical relationship between persons with disabilities and wider society, with the choreography depicting inappropriate gestures, acts of exclusion, and the objectification of the Creative Gang by the Strict Society.

At the end of the segment, the two groups came together as French singer Christine and the Queens performed Edith Piaf's Non, je ne regrette rien.

=== The Parade of Athletes ===
Olympic and Paralympic Phryges danced and play acted on stage while the 168 delegations of athletes entered the Place de Concorde in French alphabetical order, except for Australia, the United States and France, which brought up the rear in that order as the host nations of the 2032, 2028 and 2024 Summer Paralympics respectively. As the French contingent entered, Joe Dassin's "Les Champs-Élysées" as well as Yann Tiersen's theme from the film Amélie were played, and the crowd chanted "Allez Les Bleus".

==== Countries and flag bearers ====
The following is a list of all parading countries with their respective flag bearer, sorted in the order they appeared in the parade. This is sortable by country name under which they entered, the flag bearer's name, or the flag bearer's sport.

| Order | Country | French | Flag bearer | Sport | Ref. |
|---|---|---|---|---|---|
| 1 | Afghanistan (AFG) | Afghanistan | Ebrahim Danishi | Taekwondo | |
| 2 | South Africa (RSA) | Afrique du Sud | Mpumelelo Mhlongo | Athletics | |
| 2 | South Africa (RSA) | Afrique du Sud | Kat Swanepoel | Swimming | |
| 3 | Algeria (ALG) | Algérie | Mohamed Berrahal | Athletics | |
| 3 | Algeria (ALG) | Algérie | Safia Djelal | Athletics | |
| 4 | Germany (GER) | Allemagne | Edina Müller | Paracanoeing | |
| 4 | Germany (GER) | Allemagne | Martin Schulz | Paratriathlon | |
| 5 | Angola (ANG) | Angola | Juliana Moko | Athletics | |
| 5 | Angola (ANG) | Angola | Abraao Sapalo | Athletics | |
| 6 | Saudi Arabia (KSA) | Arabie saoudite | Ghaliah Al-Anazi | Table tennis | |
| 6 | Saudi Arabia (KSA) | Arabie saoudite | Abdulrahman Al-Qurashi | Athletics | |
| 7 | Argentina (ARG) | Argentine | Hernan Barreto | Athletics | |
| 7 | Argentina (ARG) | Argentine | Coty Garrone | Table tennis | |
| 8 | Armenia (ARM) | Arménie | Smbat Karapetyan | Athletics | |
| 8 | Armenia (ARM) | Arménie | Greta Vardanyan | Powerlifting | |
| 9 | Aruba (ARU) | Aruba | Elliott André Loonstra | Taekwondo | |
| 10 | Austria (AUT) | Autriche | Henriett Koosz | Badminton | |
| 10 | Austria (AUT) | Autriche | Pepo Puch | Equestrian | |
| 11 | Azerbaijan (AZE) | Azerbaïdjan | Imamaddin Khalilov | Taekwondo | |
| 11 | Azerbaijan (AZE) | Azerbaïdjan | Lamiya Valiyeva | Athletics | |
| 12 | Bahrain (BRN) | Bahreïn | Rooba Al-Omari | Athletics | |
| 12 | Bahrain (BRN) | Bahreïn | Husain Mohamed | Athletics | |
| 13 | Bangladesh (BAN) | Bangladesh | Joma Akter | Archery | |
| 13 | Bangladesh (BAN) | Bangladesh | Al Amin Hossain | Archery | |
| 14 | Barbados (BAR) | Barbade | Antwahn Boyce-Vaughan | Swimming | |
| 15 | Belgium (BEL) | Belgique | Manon Claeys | Equestrian | |
| 15 | Belgium (BEL) | Belgique | Joachim Gérard | Wheelchair tennis | |
| 16 | Benin (BEN) | Bénin | Marina Houndalowan | Athletics | |
| 17 | Bermuda (BER) | Bermudes | Jessica Cooper Lewis | Athletics | |
| 18 | Bhutan (BHU) | Bhoutan | Kinley Dem | Shooting | |
| 19 | Bosnia and Herzegovina (BIH) | Bosnie-Herzégovine | Safet Alibašić | Sitting volleyball | |
| 20 | Botswana (BOT) | Botswana | Gloria Mujaga | Athletics | |
| 20 | Botswana (BOT) | Botswana | Edwin Masuge | Athletics | |
| 21 | Brazil (BRA) | Brésil | Elizabeth Rodrigues Gomes | Athletics | |
| 21 | Brazil (BRA) | Brésil | Gabriel Araújo | Swimming | |
| 22 | Bulgaria (BUL) | Bulgarie | Stela Eneva | Athletics | |
| 23 | Burkina Faso (BUR) | Burkina Faso | Rahinatou Moné | Athletics | |
| 24 | Burundi (BDI) | Burundi | Adéline Mushiranzigo | Athletics | |
| 24 | Burundi (BDI) | Burundi | Rémy Nikobimeze | Athletics | |
| 25 | Cape Verde (CPV) | Cabo Verde | Marilson Fernandes | Athletics | |
| 25 | Cape Verde (CPV) | Cabo Verde | Heidilene Oliveira | Athletics | |
| 26 | Cambodia (CAM) | Cambodge | Vun Van | Athletics | |
| 27 | Cameroon (CMR) | Cameroun | Yves Batifi | Athletics | |
| 27 | Cameroon (CMR) | Cameroun | Marie Antoinnette Dassi | Taekwondo | |
| 28 | Canada (CAN) | Canada | Katarina Roxon | Swimming | |
| 28 | Canada (CAN) | Canada | Patrick Anderson | Wheelchair basketball | |
| 29 | Central African Republic (CAF) | République centrafricaine | Veronica Ndakara | Athletics | |
| 30 | Chile (CHI) | Chili | Camila Campos | Powerlifting | |
| 30 | Chile (CHI) | Chili | Francisco Cayulef | Wheelchair tennis | |
| 31 | China (CHN) | République populaire de Chine | Gu Haiyan | Wheelchair fencing | |
| 31 | China (CHN) | République populaire de Chine | Qi Yongkai | Powerlifting | |
| 32 | Cyprus (CYP) | Chypre | Karolina Pelendritou | Swimming | |
| 33 | Colombia (COL) | Colombie | Paula Ossa | Cycling | |
| 33 | Colombia (COL) | Colombie | Carlos Serrano Zárate | Swimming | |
| 34 | Republic of the Congo (CGO) | Congo | Emmanuel Mouambako | Athletics | |
| 34 | Republic of the Congo (CGO) | Congo | Mireille Nganga | Athletics | |
| 35 | Democratic Republic of the Congo (COD) | République démocratique du Congo | Paulin Mayombo | Athletics | |
| 35 | Democratic Republic of the Congo (COD) | République démocratique du Congo | Nancy Nsenga | Athletics | |
| 36 | South Korea (KOR) | République de Corée | Choi Yong-beom | Paracanoeing | |
| 37 | Costa Rica (CRC) | Costa Rica | Andres Molina | Taekwondo | |
| 37 | Costa Rica (CRC) | Costa Rica | Maria Riveros | Archery | |
| 38 | Ivory Coast (CIV) | Côte d'Ivoire | Adou Ano | Powerlifting | |
| 39 | Croatia (CRO) | Croatie | Anđela Muzinić Vincetić | Table tennis | |
| 39 | Croatia (CRO) | Croatie | Dino Sinovčić | Swimming | |
| 40 | Cuba (CUB) | Cuba | Omara Durand | Athletics | |
| 40 | Cuba (CUB) | Cuba | Robiel Yankiel Sol Cervantes | Athletics | |
| 41 | Denmark (DEN) | Danemark | Tobias Thorning Jørgensen | Equestrian | |
| 41 | Denmark (DEN) | Danemark | Katrine Kristensen | Equestrian | |
| 42 | Dominican Republic (DOM) | République dominicaine | Darlenys de la Cruz | Athletics | |
| 42 | Dominican Republic (DOM) | République dominicaine | Jesús Manuel Rodríguez | Powerlifting | |
| 43 | Egypt (EGY) | Egypte | Rehab Ahmed | Powerlifting | |
| 43 | Egypt (EGY) | Egypte | Ali El-Zieny | Rowing | |
| 44 | El Salvador (ESA) | El Salvador | Herbert Aceituno | Powerlifting | |
| 44 | El Salvador (ESA) | El Salvador | Rebeca Duarte | Boccia | |
| 45 | United Arab Emirates (UAE) | Émirats arabes unis | Ahmed El-Bedwawi | Cycling | |
| 45 | United Arab Emirates (UAE) | Émirats arabes unis | Maryam Al-Zeyoudi | Athletics | |
| 46 | Ecuador (ECU) | Équateur | Kiara Rodríguez | Athletics | |
| 46 | Ecuador (ECU) | Équateur | Jimmy Caicedo | Athletics | |
| 47 | Eritrea (ERI) | Érythrée | Sibhatu Weldemariam | Athletics | |
| 48 | Spain (ESP) | Espagne | Marta Arce | Judo | |
| 48 | Spain (ESP) | Espagne | Álvaro Valera | Table tennis | |
| 49 | Estonia (EST) | Estonie | Laura-Liis Juursalu | Paratriathlon | |
| 49 | Estonia (EST) | Estonie | Robin Liksor | Swimming | |
| 50 | Ethiopia (ETH) | Ethiopie | Yayesh Tesfaw | Athletics | |
| 50 | Ethiopia (ETH) | Ethiopie | Yitayal Yigzaw | Athletics | |
| 51 | Fiji (FIJ) | Fidji | Irene Mar | Taekwondo | |
| 52 | Finland (FIN) | Finlande | Laura Kangasniemi | Equestrian | |
| 52 | Finland (FIN) | Finlande | Leo-Pekka Tähti | Athletics | |
| 53 | Gabon (GAB) | Gabon | Audrey Mengue | Athletics | |
| 53 | Gabon (GAB) | Gabon | Davy Moukagni | Athletics | |
| 54 | The Gambia (GAM) | Gambie | Fatou Sanneh | Athletics | |
| 54 | The Gambia (GAM) | Gambie | Malang Tamba | Athletics | |
| 55 | Georgia (GEO) | Géorgie | Akaki Jintcharadze | Powerlifting | |
| 56 | Ghana (GHA) | Ghana | Tahiru Haruna | Powerlifting | |
| 56 | Ghana (GHA) | Ghana | Zinabu Issah | Athletics | |
| 57 | Great Britain (GBR) | Grande-Bretagne | Terry Bywater | Wheelchair basketball | |
| 57 | Great Britain (GBR) | Grande-Bretagne | Lucy Shuker | Wheelchair tennis | |
| 58 | Greece (GRE) | Grèce | Manolis Stefanoudakis | Athletics | |
| 58 | Greece (GRE) | Grèce | Theodora Paschalidou | Judo | |
| 59 | Grenada (GRN) | Grenade | Ishona Charles | Athletics | |
| 59 | Grenada (GRN) | Grenade | Tyler Smith | Athletics | |
| 60 | Guatemala (GUA) | Guatemala | Juan Blas | Archery | |
| 60 | Guatemala (GUA) | Guatemala | Ericka Violeta Esteban Villatoro | Athletics | |
| 61 | Guinea (GUI) | Guinée | Kadiatou Bangoura | Athletics | |
| 61 | Guinea (GUI) | Guinée | Yamoussa Sylla | Athletics | |
| 62 | Guinea-Bissau (GBS) | Guinée-Bissau | Volunteer | | |
| 63 | Haiti (HAI) | Haïti | Ywenson Registre | Athletics | |
| 64 | Honduras (HON) | Honduras | Olvin Cruz | Swimming | |
| 65 | Hong Kong (HKG) | Hong Kong, Chine | Daniel Chan Ho Yuen | Badminton | |
| 65 | Hong Kong (HKG) | Hong Kong, Chine | Wong Ting Ting | Table tennis | |
| 66 | Hungary (HUN) | Hongrie | Bence Mocsári | Paratriathlon | |
| 66 | Hungary (HUN) | Hongrie | Fanni Illés | Swimming | |
| 67 | India (IND) | Inde | Bhagyashree Jadhav | Athletics | |
| 67 | India (IND) | Inde | Sumit Antil | Athletics | |
| 68 | Indonesia (INA) | Indonésie | Fadli Immammuddin | Cycling | |
| 68 | Indonesia (INA) | Indonésie | Leli Marlina | Table tennis | |
| 69 | Iran (IRI) | République islamique d'Iran | Mohammadreza Mirshafiei | Shooting | |
| 69 | Iran (IRI) | République islamique d'Iran | Hajar Safarzadeh | Athletics | |
| 70 | Iraq (IRQ) | Iraq | Faris Abed | Powerlifting | |
| 70 | Iraq (IRQ) | Iraq | Fatimah Suwaed | Athletics | |
| 71 | Ireland (IRL) | Irlande | Orla Comerford | Athletics | |
| 71 | Ireland (IRL) | Irlande | Colin Judge | Table tennis | |
| 72 | Iceland (ISL) | Islande | Mar Gunnarsson | Swimming | |
| 72 | Iceland (ISL) | Islande | Sonja Sigurðardóttir | Swimming | |
| 73 | Israel (ISR) | Israël | Lihi Ben-David | Goalball | |
| 73 | Israel (ISR) | Israël | Adam Berdichevsky | Wheelchair tennis | |
| 74 | Italy (ITA) | Italie | Ambra Sabatini | Athletics | |
| 74 | Italy (ITA) | Italie | Luca Mazzone | Cycling | |
| 75 | Jamaica (JAM) | Jamaïque | Theodor Rahjane Thomas | Athletics | |
| 76 | Japan (JPN) | Japon | Nishiyama Daiki | Athletics | |
| 76 | Japan (JPN) | Japon | Nishida An | Swimming | |
| 77 | Jordan (JOR) | Joradnie | Asma Issa | Powerlifting | |
| 77 | Jordan (JOR) | Joradnie | Abdelkareem Mohmmad Ahmad Khattab | Powerlifting | |
| 78 | Kazakhstan (KAZ) | Kazakhstan | Sevda Aliyeva | Shooting | |
| 78 | Kazakhstan (KAZ) | Kazakhstan | Berik Izmaganbetov | Sitting volleyball | |
| 79 | Kenya (KEN) | Kenya | Samwel Mushai Kimani | Athletics | |
| 79 | Kenya (KEN) | Kenya | Asiya Muhammed Sururu | Rowing | |
| 80 | Kyrgyzstan (KGZ) | Kirghizistan | Mamatibraim Suranov | Judo | |
| 81 | Kiribati (KIR) | Kiribati | Ongio Timeon | Athletics | |
| 82 | Kosovo (KOS) | Kosovo | Grevist Bytyci | Athletics | |
| 83 | Kuwait (KUW) | Koweit | Faisal Sorour | Athletics | |
| 84 | Laos (LAO) | République démocratique populaire lao | Ken Thepthida | Athletics | |
| 85 | Lesotho (LES) | Lesotho | Zimesele Khamoqane | Athletics | |
| 85 | Lesotho (LES) | Lesotho | Litsitso Khotlele | Athletics | |
| 86 | Latvia (LAT) | Lettonie | Diana Krumina | Athletics | |
| 86 | Latvia (LAT) | Lettonie | Rihards Snikus | Equestrian | |
| 87 | Lebanon (LBN) | Liban | Arz Zahreddine | Athletics | |
| 88 | Liberia (LBR) | Libéria | Jutomu Kollie | Athletics | |
| 88 | Liberia (LBR) | Libéria | Angie Myers | Athletics | |
| 89 | Libya (LBA) | Libye | Ghazalah Alaqouri | Powerlifting | |
| 89 | Libya (LBA) | Libye | Waleed Ashteebah | Athletics | |
| 90 | Lithuania (LTU) | Lituanie | Gabriele Cepaviciute | Swimming | |
| 90 | Lithuania (LTU) | Lituanie | Donatas Dundzys | Athletics | |
| 91 | Luxembourg (LUX) | Luxembourg | Tom Habscheid | Athletics | |
| 91 | Luxembourg (LUX) | Luxembourg | Katrin Kohl | Athletics | |
| 92 | Macau (MAC) | Macao, Chine | Hao Lei Chio | Athletics | |
| 93 | North Macedonia (MKD) | Macédoine du Nord | Volunteer | | |
| 94 | Malaysia (MAS) | Malaisie | Bonnie Bunyau Gustin | Powerlifting | |
| 94 | Malaysia (MAS) | Malaisie | Nur Suraiya Muhamad Zamri | Cycling | |
| 95 | Malawi (MAW) | Malawi | Moses Misoya | Athletics | |
| 95 | Malawi (MAW) | Malawi | Estere Nagoli | Athletics | |
| 96 | Maldives (MDV) | Maldives | Abdul Razzag Abdul Samad | Athletics | |
| 96 | Maldives (MDV) | Maldives | Fathimath Ibrahim | Athletics | |
| 97 | Mali (MLI) | Mali | Samba Coulibaly | Athletics | |
| 97 | Mali (MLI) | Mali | Korotoumou Coulibaly | Athletics | |
| 98 | Malta (MLT) | Malte | Antonio Flores | Athletics | |
| 98 | Malta (MLT) | Malte | Maja Theuma | Swimming | |
| 99 | Morocco (MAR) | Maroc | Najwa Awane | Wheelchair tennis | |
| 99 | Morocco (MAR) | Maroc | Hicham Lamlas | Blind football | |
| 100 | Mauritius (MRI) | Maurice | Noemi Alphonse | Athletics | |
| 100 | Mauritius (MRI) | Maurice | Roberto Michel | Athletics | |
| 101 | Mexico (MEX) | Mexique | Salvador Hernández | Athletics | |
| 101 | Mexico (MEX) | Mexique | Fabiola Ramírez | Swimming | |
| 102 | Moldova (MDA) | République de Moldavie | Larisa Marinenkova | Powerlifting | |
| 102 | Moldova (MDA) | République de Moldavie | Gheorghe Spinu | Athletics | |
| 103 | Mongolia (MGL) | Mongolia | Oyun-Erdene Batgerel | Archery | |
| 103 | Mongolia (MGL) | Mongolia | Enkhbayaryn Sodnompiljee | Powerlifting | |
| 104 | Montenegro (MNE) | Monténégro | Luka Bakić | Table tennis | |
| 104 | Montenegro (MNE) | Monténégro | Maja Rajković | Athletics | |
| 105 | Mozambique (MOZ) | Mozambique | Edmilsa Governo | Athletics | |
| 106 | Myanmar (MYA) | Myanmar | Soe Pea | Athletics | |
| 107 | Namibia (NAM) | Namibie | | | |
| 108 | Nepal (NEP) | Népal | | | |
| 109 | Nicaragua (NCA) | Nicaragua | | | |
| 110 | Niger (NIG) | Niger | | | |
| 111 | Nigeria (NGR) | Nigéria | Lauritta Onye | Athletics | |
| 112 | Norway (NOR) | Norvège | Salum Ageze Kashafali | Athletics | |
| 112 | Norway (NOR) | Norvège | Ida Yessica Nesse | Athletics | |
| 113 | New Zealand (NZL) | Nouvelle-Zélande | Anna Grimaldi | Athletics | |
| 113 | New Zealand (NZL) | Nouvelle-Zélande | Cameron Leslie | Swimming | |
| 114 | Oman (OMA) | Oman | Sara Al Anburi | Athletics | |
| 114 | Oman (OMA) | Oman | Mohammed Al Mashaykhi | Athletics | |
| 115 | Uganda (UGA) | Ouganda | Dennis Mbaziira | Powerlifting | |
| 115 | Uganda (UGA) | Ouganda | Peace Oroma | Athletics | |
| 116 | Uzbekistan (UZB) | Ouzbékistan | Mokhigul Khamdamova | Athletics | |
| 116 | Uzbekistan (UZB) | Ouzbékistan | Khusniddin Norbekov | Athletics | |
| 117 | Pakistan (PAK) | Pakistan | | | |
| 118 | Palestine (PLE) | Palestine | | | |
| 119 | Panama (PAN) | Panama | | | |
| 120 | Papua New Guinea (PNG) | Papouasie-Nouvelle-Guinée | | | |
| 121 | Paraguay (PAR) | Paraguay | Melissa Tillner | Athletics | |
| 122 | Netherlands (NED) | Pays-Bas | Carina de Rooij | Wheelchair basketball | |
| 122 | Netherlands (NED) | Pays-Bas | Daniel Abraham | Cycling | |
| 123 | Peru (PER) | Pérou | | | |
| 124 | Philippines (PHI) | Philippines | Agustina Bantiloc | Archery | |
| 124 | Philippines (PHI) | Philippines | Ernie Gawilan | Swimming | |
| 125 | Poland (POL) | Pologne | | | |
| 126 | Puerto Rico (PUR) | Porto Rico | | | |
| 127 | Portugal (POR) | Portugal | Diogo Cancela | Swimming | |
| 127 | Portugal (POR) | Portugal | Margarida Lapa | Shooting | |
| 128 | Qatar (QAT) | Qatar | | | |
| 129 | Refugee Paralympic Team (RPT) | Équipe paralympique des réfugiés | Guillaume Junior Atangana | Athletics | |
| 130 | Romania (ROU) | Roumanie | | | |
| 131 | Rwanda (RWA) | Rwanda | | | |
| 132 | Saint Vincent and the Grenadines (VIN) | Saint-Vincent-et-les-Grenadines | | | |
| 133 | Solomon Islands (SOL) | Îles Salomon | | | |
| 134 | São Tomé and Príncipe (STP) | Sao Tomé-et-Principe | | | |
| 135 | Senegal (SEN) | Sénégal | | | |
| 136 | Serbia (SRB) | Serbia | | | |
| 137 | Sierra Leone (SLE) | Sierra Leone | | | |
| 138 | Singapore (SGP) | Singapour | | | |
| 139 | Slovakia (SVK) | Slovaquie | | | |
| 140 | Slovenia (SLO) | Slovénie | | | |
| 141 | Somalia (SOM) | Somalie | | | |
| 142 | Sri Lanka (SRI) | Sri Lanka | | | |
| 143 | Sweden (SWE) | Suède | | | |
| 144 | Switzerland (SUI) | Suisse | | | |
| 145 | Suriname (SUR) | Suriname | | | |
| 146 | Syria (SYR) | République arabe syrienne | | | |
| 147 | Chinese Taipei (TPE) | Chinese Taipei | | | |
| 148 | Tanzania (TAN) | République-Unie de Tanzanie | | | |
| 149 | Czech Republic (CZE) | Tchéquie | | | |
| 150 | Thailand (THA) | Thaïlande | | | |
| 151 | Timor-Leste (TLS) | République démocratique du Timor-Leste | | | |
| 152 | Togo (TOG) | Togo | | | |
| 153 | Tonga (TGA) | Tonga | | | |
| 154 | Trinidad and Tobago (TTO) | Trinité-et-Tobago | | | |
| 155 | Tunisia (TUN) | Tunisie | | | |
| 156 | Turkey (TUR) | Türkiye | | | |
| 157 | Turkmenistan (TKM) | Turkménistan | | | |
| 158 | Ukraine (UKR) | Ukraine | Olena Fedota-Isaieva | Wheelchair fencing | |
| 159 | Uruguay (URU) | Uruguay | | | |
| 160 | Vanuatu (VAN) | Vanuatu | Elie Enock | Athletics | |
| 161 | Venezuela (VEN) | Venezuela | | | |
| 162 | Virgin Islands (ISV) | Îles Vierges américaines | | | |
| 163 | Vietnam (VIE) | Vietnam | Lê Văn Công | Powerlifting | |
| 163 | Vietnam (VIE) | Vietnam | Châu Hoàng Tuyết Loan | Powerlifting | |
| 164 | Yemen (YEM) | Yémen | | | |
| 165 | Zambia (ZAM) | Zambie | Volunteer | | |
| 166 | Zimbabwe (ZIM) | Zimbabwe | Tinotenda Nicole Bango | Athletics | |
| 166 | Zimbabwe (ZIM) | Zimbabwe | Kudakwashe Paidamoyo Chigwedere | Athletics | |
| 167 | Australia (AUS) | Australie | Madison de Rozario | Athletics | |
| 167 | Australia (AUS) | Australie | Brenden Hall | Swimming | |
| 168 | United States (USA) | États-Unis d'Amérique | Steve Serio | Wheelchair basketball | |
| 168 | United States (USA) | États-Unis d'Amérique | Nicky Nieves | Sitting volleyball | |
| 169 | France (FRA) | France | Nantenin Keïta | Athletics | |
| 169 | France (FRA) | France | Alexis Hanquinquant | Paratriathlon | |

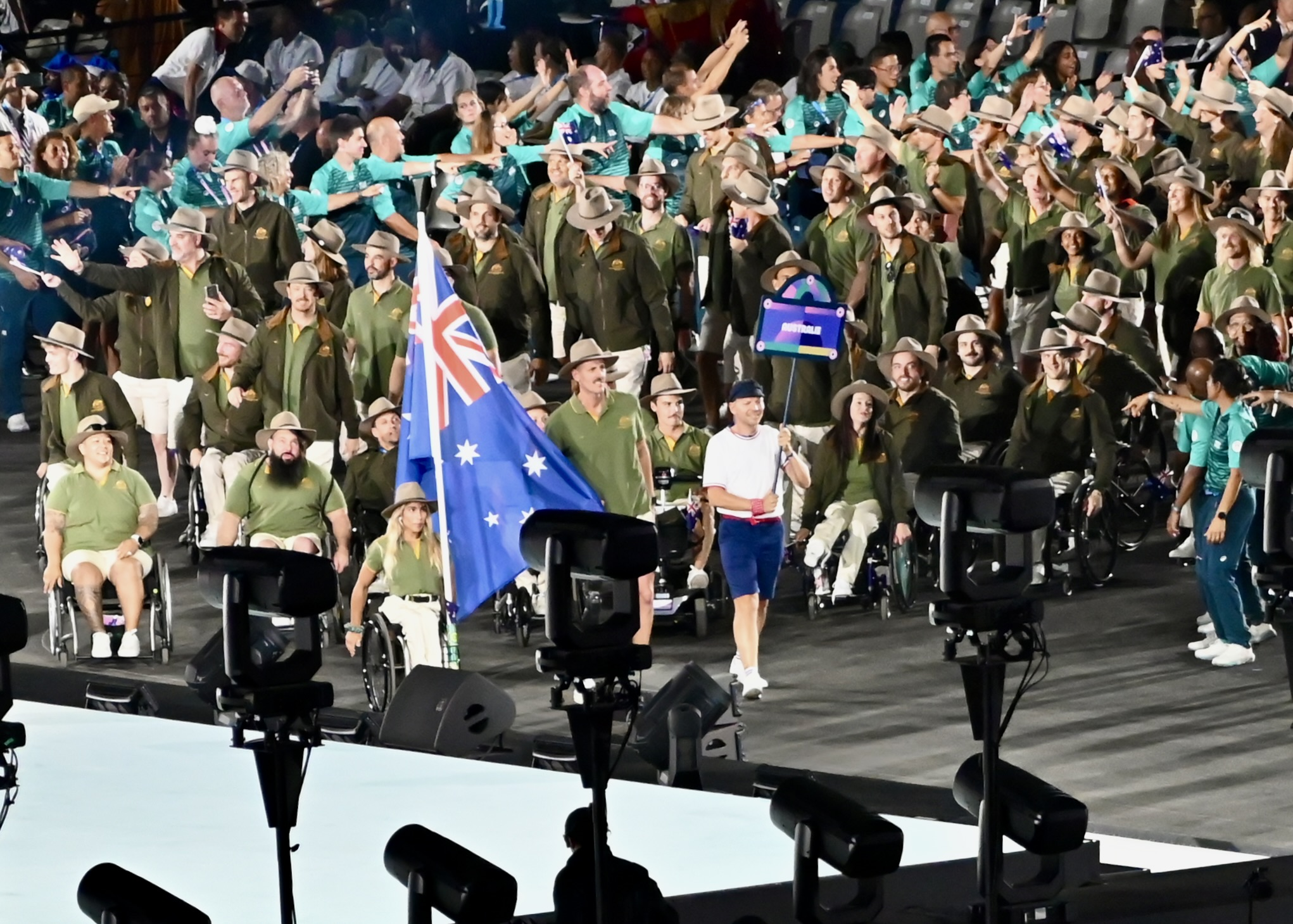
Australian contingent enters with the flag carried by Madison de Rozario and Brenden Hall

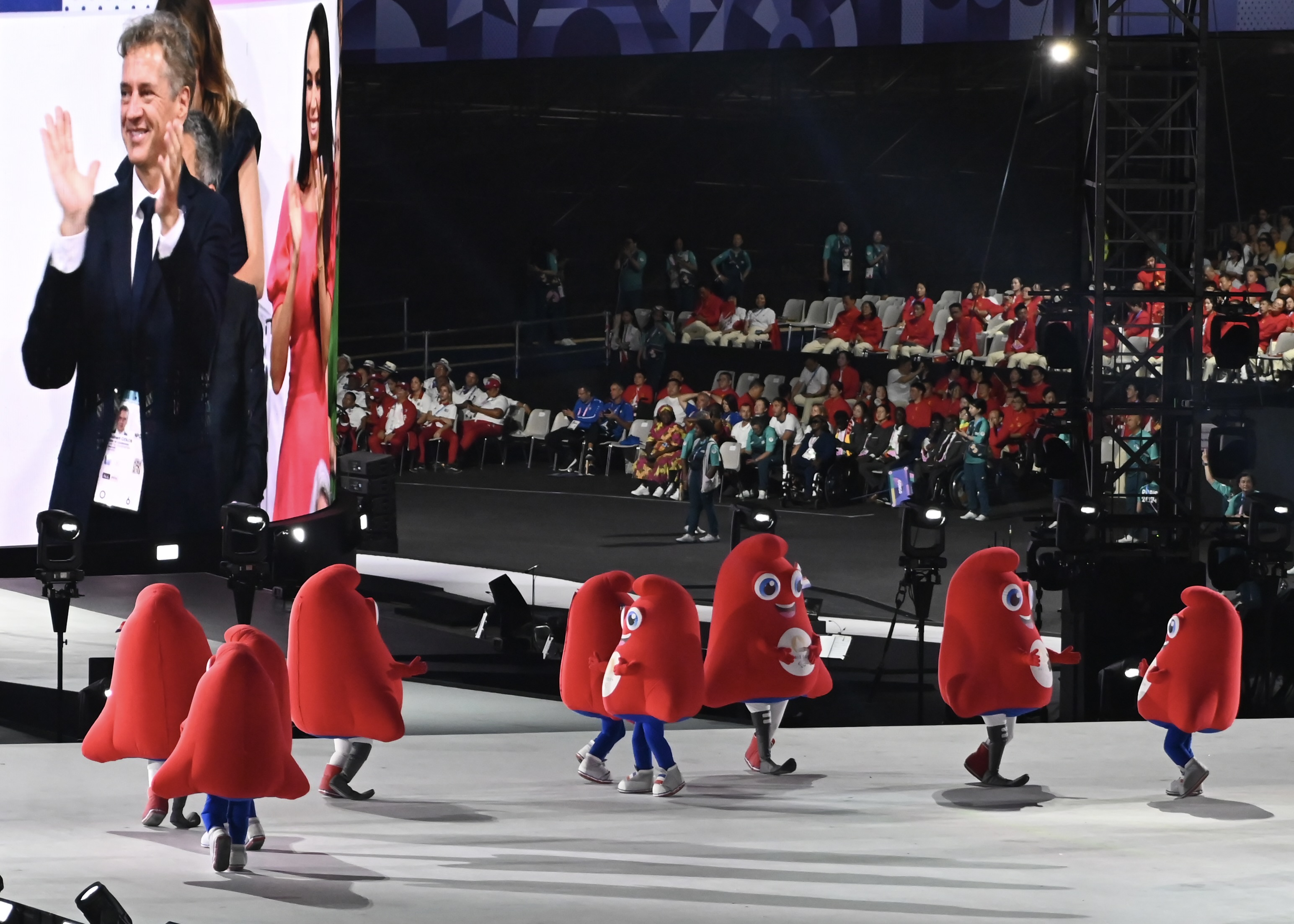
Dancing Phryges mascots

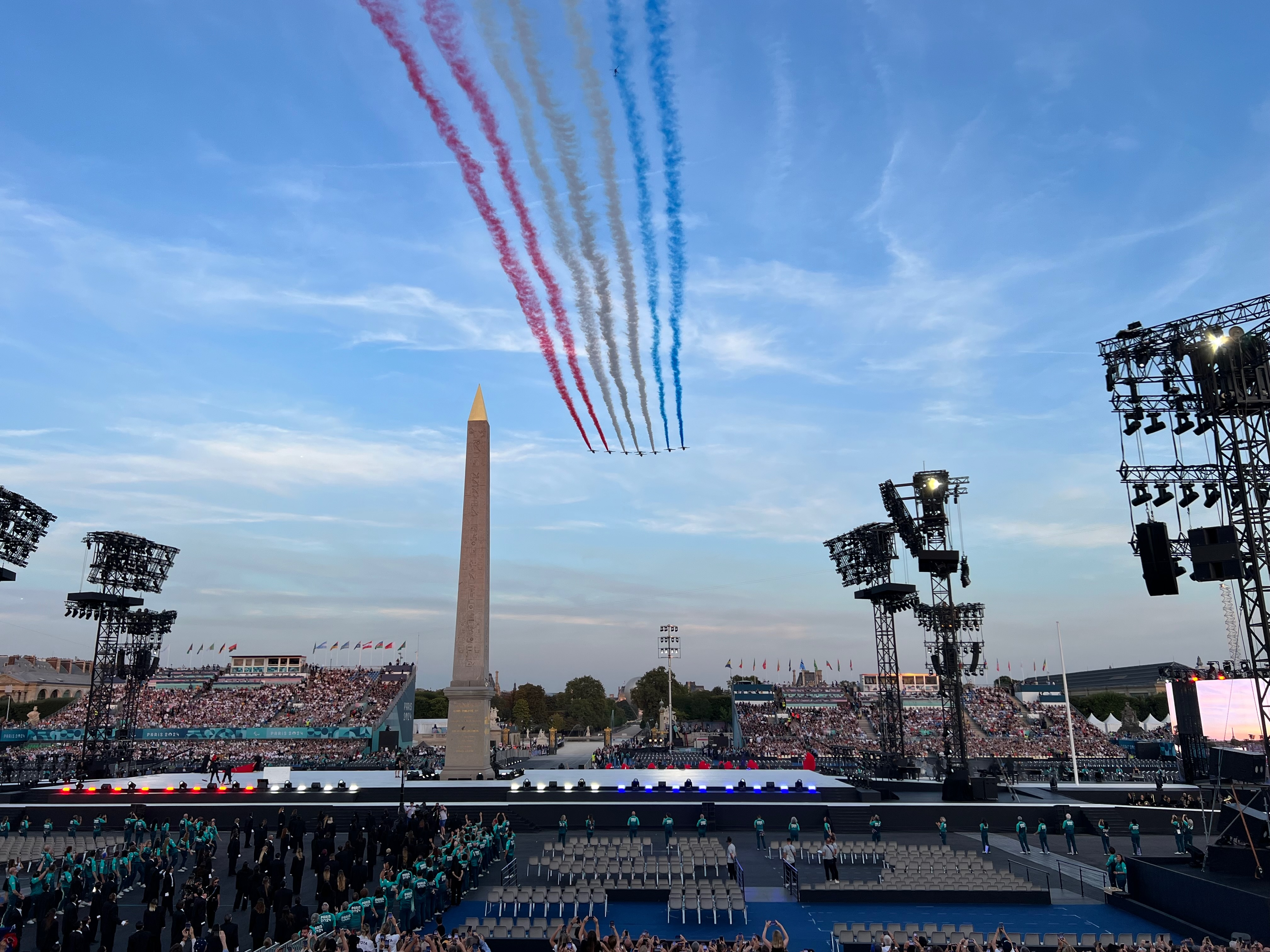
The Patrouille de France flies over the Place de la Concorde to start the parade

=== My Ability ===
The segment opened with a film depicting various persons with disabilities narrating their journeys to self-acceptance over their disabilities.

Afterwards, the one-armed French singer Lucky Love sang "My Ability", with the Strict Society joining him. This sequence represented the Strict Society's realization of their internalized prejudices, leading to self reflections and their awakening.

=== Protocol ===
A video was shown depicting the origins of the Paralympic movement under Sir Ludwig Guttmann at the spinal injuries hospital in Stoke Mandeville in the UK.

French Armed Forces personnel raised the French flag while the French National Anthem, La Marseillaise was performed by music director Victor Le Masne. Brief speeches were given by Tony Estanguet, the President of the Games of Paris 2024, and Andrew Parsons, the President of the International Paralympic Committee. Emmanuel Macron, the President of France, then officially declared the Paris 2024 Paralympic Games open.

=== New Ways ===
A video was shown in which blind Canadian YouTube personality Molly Burke, quadriplegic comedian Martin Petit, and the amputee Lucie Retail spoke frankly about their respective disabilities, the way they affect their lives and the way they are perceived and treated by others.

=== Sportography ===
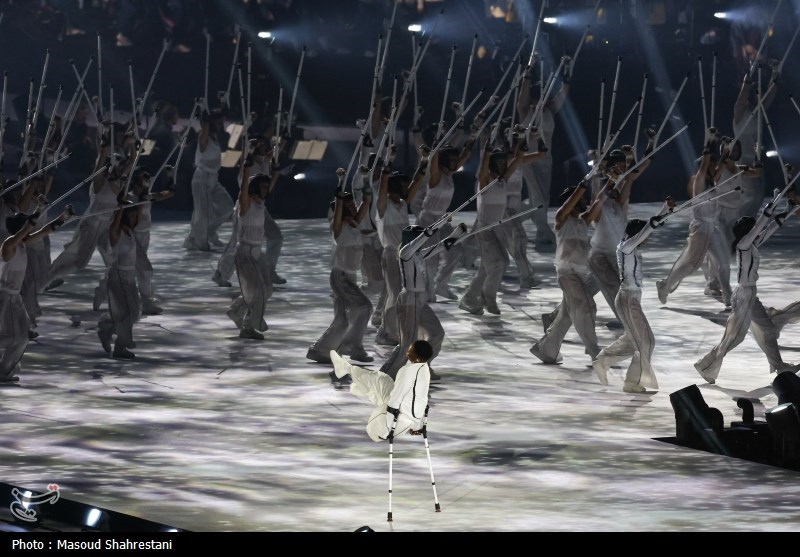
Sportography choreographed performance

The video was followed by another choreographed performance with the Strict Society and the Creative Gang, featuring one-armed hip-hop dancer Angelina Bruno, wheelchair dancer Piotr Iwanicki and Musa Motha, a finalist on Britain's Got Talent in 2023 and America's Got Talent: Fantasy League.

The segment depicted both groups coming together, blending dance, sport, and art into a fictional game that highlighted teamwork and adaptive sport, as well as the overcoming of physical differences.

=== Paralympic Flag, Anthem and Oaths ===
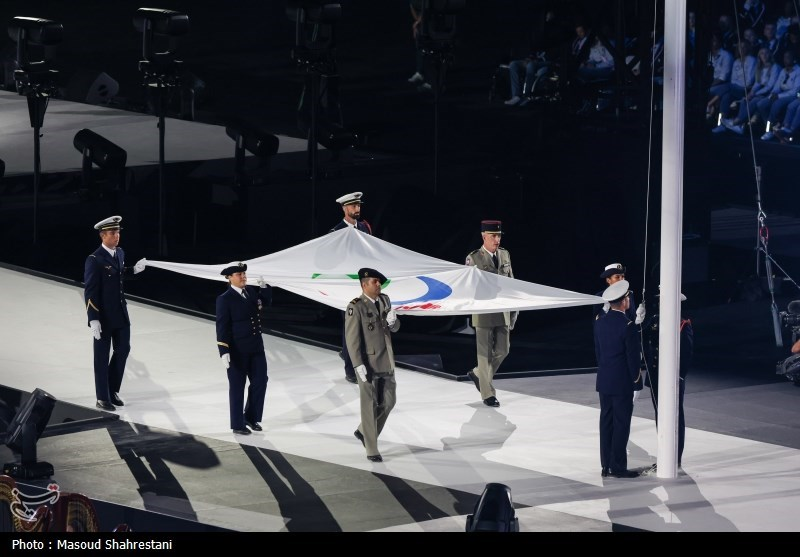
The Paralympic Flag is carried across the stage

The Paralympic flag was brought on stage by British Paralympic sprinter and astronaut John McFall and French sailor Damien Seguin, while visually impaired musician Luan Pommier, played the Paralympic Anthem on the piano. French athletes Sandrine Martinet and Arnaud Assoumani took the Paralympic Oath, along with a coach and an official.

=== Arrival of the Flame ===
The 2024 Summer Paralympics torch relay saw the Paralympic flame lit in Stoke Mandeville on 24 August and carried through the Channel Tunnel by 24 British and 24 French torch bearers. The flame was divided into twelve flames, which were carried through France by 1,000 torch bearers. As the flame entered the arena, it was greeted by 150 dancers and performers carrying torches. To symbolise the connection between the Olympics and Paralympics, the flame was brought into the Place de la Concorde by Florent Manaudou, the flag bearer of the French Olympic team, and handed to Paralympian Michael Jeremiasz, the French Paralympic chef de mission.

=== Concord ===
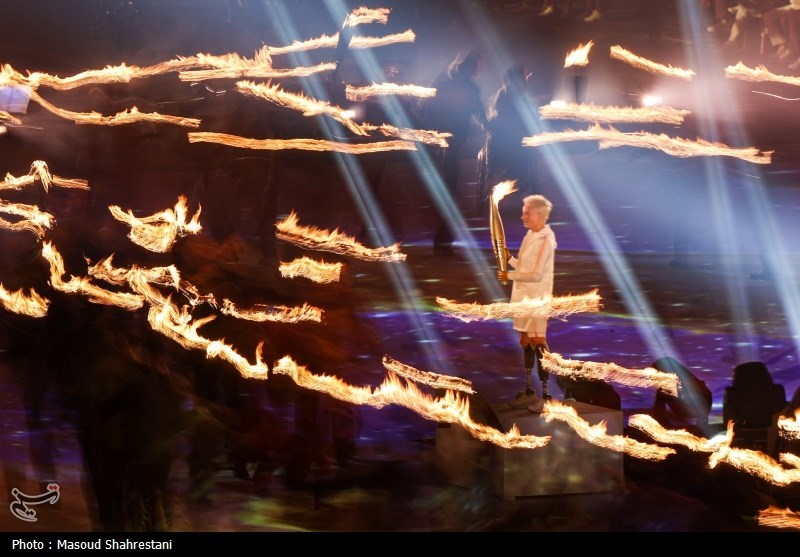
150 dancers with torches surround the Paralympic flame during the Concord segment

The flame was then carried in turn by three international Paralympic champions: Italian wheelchair fencer Bebe Vio, American multi paralympic sportperson Oksana Masters and the German long jumper Markus Rehm.

As the flame was handed over between the torchbearers, the 150 dancers carrying torches performed a choreography set to Maurice Ravel's Bolero. This represented the achieving of concord, a contrast to the previous segment Discord which opened the ceremony. The segment culminated with the formation of the Paralympic agitos, and the flame's departure from the Place de la Concorde.

=== Lighting of the Cauldron ===
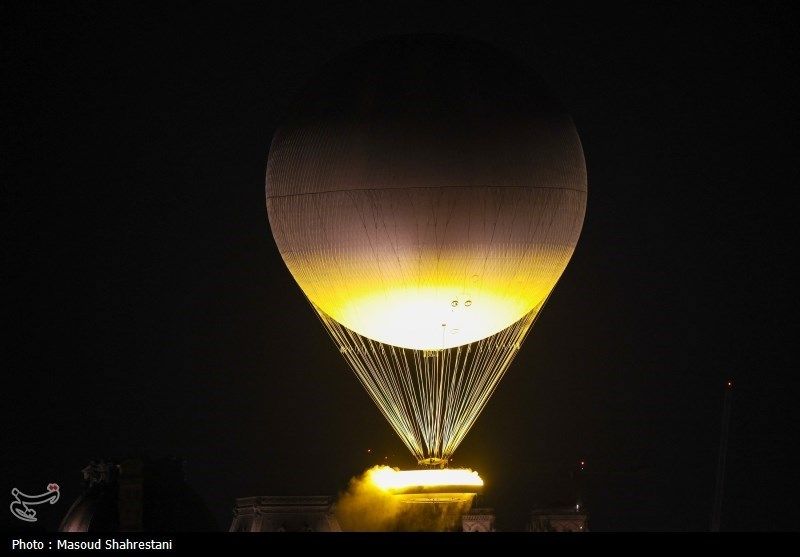
The Paralympic cauldron after being lit

The torch was then carried to the Jardin des Tuileries by three French champions: Assia El Hannouni, Christian Lachaud and Béatrice Hess. French athletes Charles-Antoine Kouakou, Nantenin Keïta, Fabien Lamirault, Alexis Hanquinquant and Élodie Lorandi lit the cauldron. The cauldron took the form of a 7-metre diameter ring of fire with 40 computerised LEDs and 200 high-pressure water aerosol spray dispensers which was topped by a 30-metre-tall helium sphere resembling a hot air balloon 22 metres in diameter, that rose in the air, reminiscent of the first flight in a hydrogen balloon by Jacques Charles and the Robert brothers in Paris in 1783.

=== Celebration ===
The ceremony concluded with a laser light and fireworks display. Dancers performed on stage, which was flooded with colour in tribute to British artist Sue Austin, who used a wheelchair to paint, while Christine and the Queens sang Patrick Hernandez's "Born to Be Alive".

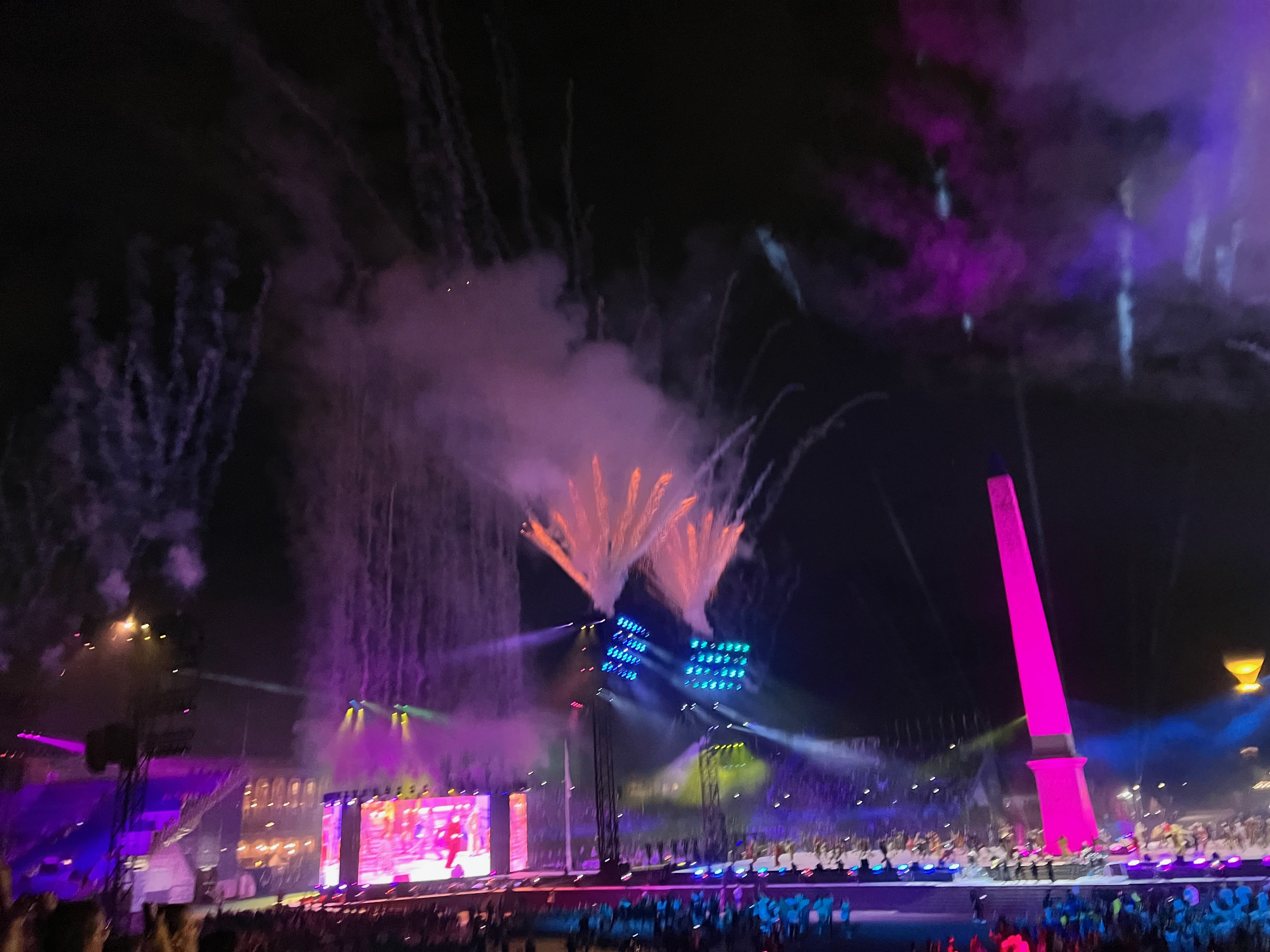
Laser light display

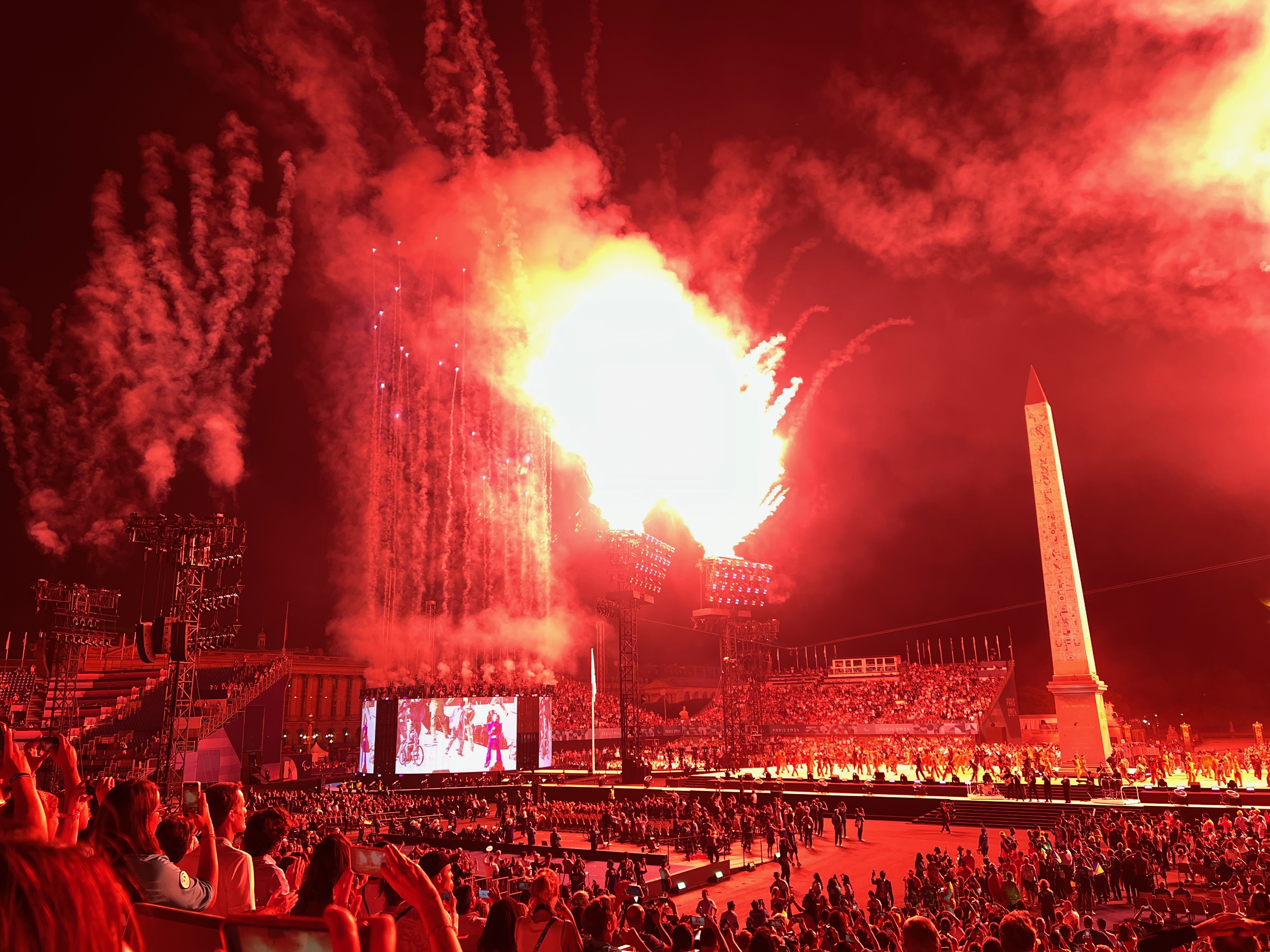
Fireworks

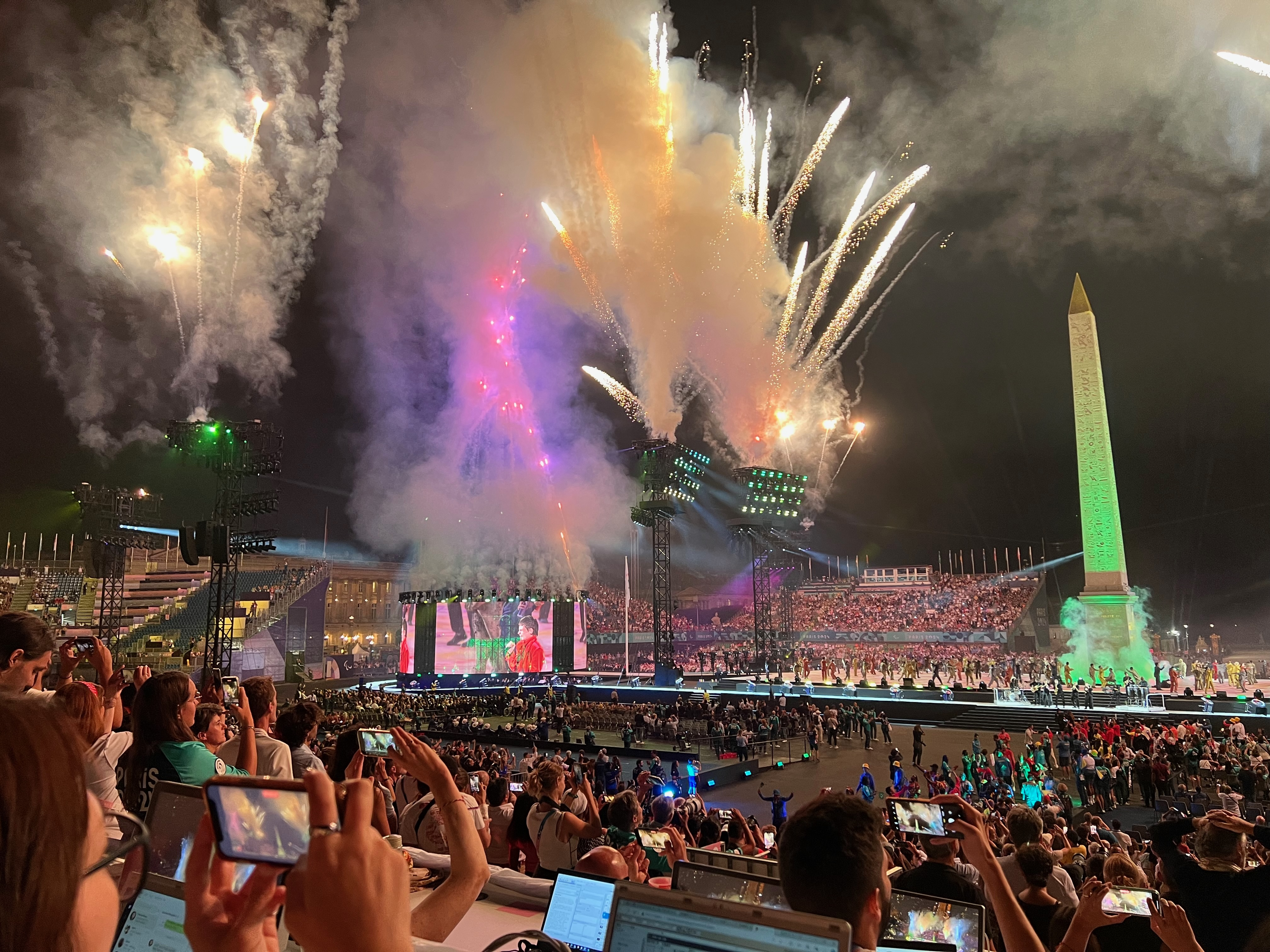
Fireworks

== Dignitaries ==
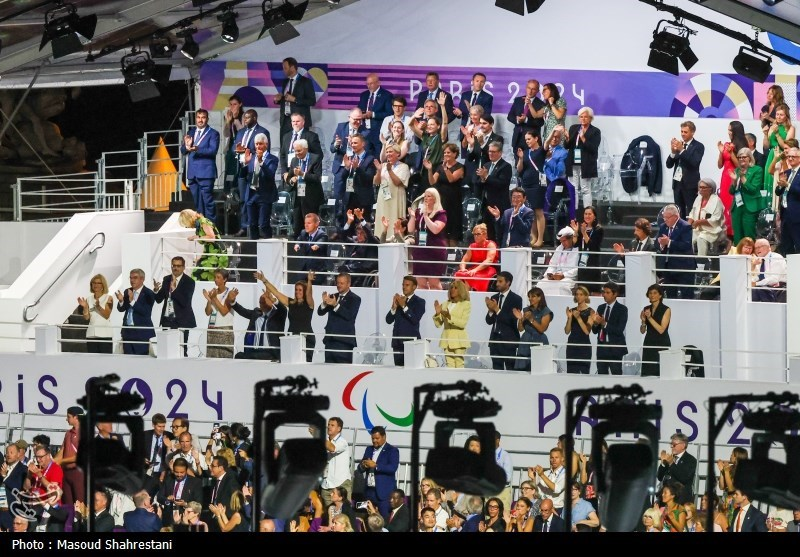
Dignitaries including Andrew Parsons, Emmanuel Macron, Brigitte Macron, Tony Estanguet and Anne Hidalgo

Dignitaries who attended the ceremony included the following:

| Nation | Name | Title |
|---|---|---|
| Germany | Frank-Walter Steinmeier; Elke Büdenbender | President |
| Australia | Sam Mostyn | Governor-General |
| Belgium | Astrid of Belgium; Lorenz | Prince and Princess |
| Canada | Mary Simon | Governor-General |
| France | Emmanuel Macron; Brigitte Macron; Gabriel Attal; Amélie Oudéa-Castéra; Anne Hidalgo; Tony Estanguet; Marie-Amélie Le Fur | President; Wife of the President; Prime Minister; Minister of Sports and Olympic and Paralympic Games; Mayor of Paris; President of Paris 2024 Olympic Organizing Committee; President of the French Paralympic and Sports Committee |
| Iceland | Halla Tómasdóttir | President |
| Italy | Sergio Mattarella | President |
| Lithuania | Gitanas Nausėda | President |
| Luxembourg | Henri; María Teresa | Grand Duke |
| Monaco | Albert II of Monaco | Prince |
| United Kingdom | Keir Starmer | Prime Minister |
| United States | Tammy Duckworth | Vice Chair of the Democratic National Committee |
| Slovenia | Robert Golob | Prime Minister |
| Czech Republic | Petr Pavel | President |

=== International organisations ===
| Organisation | Name | Title |
|---|---|---|
| IPC | Andrew Parsons | President |
| IOC | Thomas Bach | President |
