= 2024 Summer Olympics and Paralympics cauldron =

Artwork in Paris by Mathieu Lehanneur

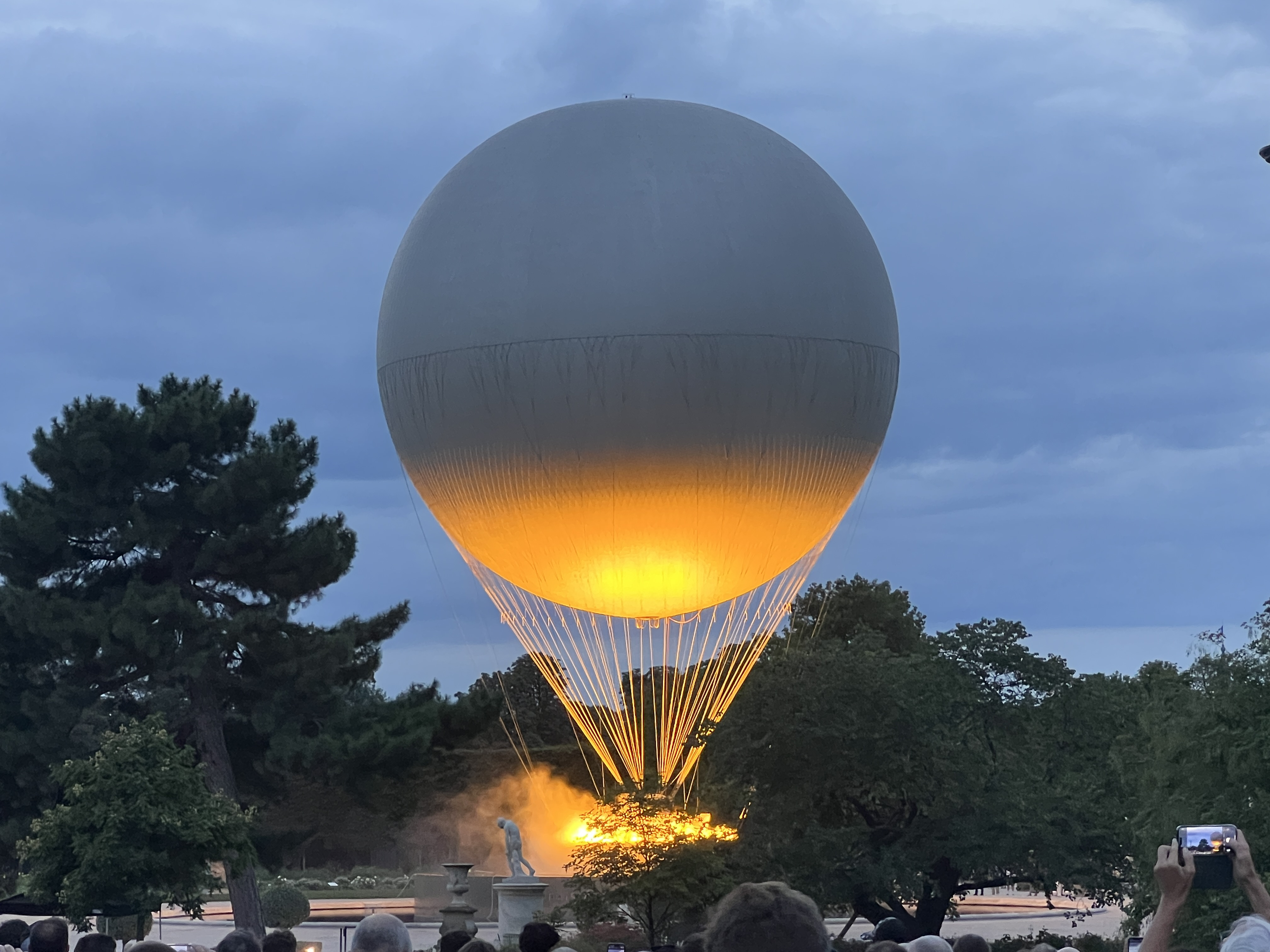
- The cauldron at the Tuileries Garden
- Artist: Mathieu Lehanneur
- Year: 2024 - 2028
- Location: Paris, France; 48°51′46″N 2°19′46″E

The 2024 Summer Olympics and Paralympics cauldron (French: La vasque des Jeux olympiques et paralympiques d'été de 2024) was made for the 2024 Summer Olympics and Paralympics in Paris. It is located at the Tuileries Garden.

== Design ==
The French Olympic Committee commissioned Mathieu Lehanneur (born 1974), to design the cauldron, torch, and ceremonial cauldrons along the torch relay route: Lehanneur developed a concept of having these three items symbolise France's national motto, "Liberté, égalité, fraternité" ("Liberty, equality, fraternity"), and gold, silver, and bronze medals respectively. Lehanneur described them as "three chapters in the same story", with the cauldron representing liberty, gold medals, and serving as "the epilogue and the ultimate symbol of that story. Light, magical and unifying."

The cauldron consisted of a 7-metre (23 ft) diameter ring suspended from a 30-meter-tall (98-foot) helium-filled balloon. Its design was designed to pay homage to the Scientific Revolution and the Age of Enlightenment of the 17th and 18th centuries–and, in particular, France's historical contributions to balloon flight; in 1783, the Montgolfier brothers conducted the first human flight using a hot air balloon.

For the first time, as part of goals to reduce carbon emissions, the cauldron did not contain an actual flame generated via combustion. Instead, the presence of the Olympic flame was simulated via an LED lighting system, consisting of 40 lamps illuminating a cloud of mist generated by 200 water jets. The system was developed in partnership with Électricité de France (EDF), France's state-owned energy company. During the Olympic Games, the Olympic flame was kept in the same lantern in which it traveled from Greece to French territory through the Mediterranean Sea in May 2024 and was protected by armored glass on display to the side in a small podium at the garden.

The cauldron was tethered to a wire-like conduit anchored to a platform installed in the center of the Grand Bassin Rond—a large, circular ornamental pond at the Tuileries Garden; each night during the Games, the balloon ascended into the night sky, floating aloft 60 metres (200 feet) over the Garden, illuminated against the twilight. The setting was in line with landmarks such as the Louvre Pyramid, the Obelisk at Place de la Concorde, the Arc de Triomphe, and, in the distance, the Eiffel Tower. It was operated by French balloon manufacturer Aerophile.

== Use ==
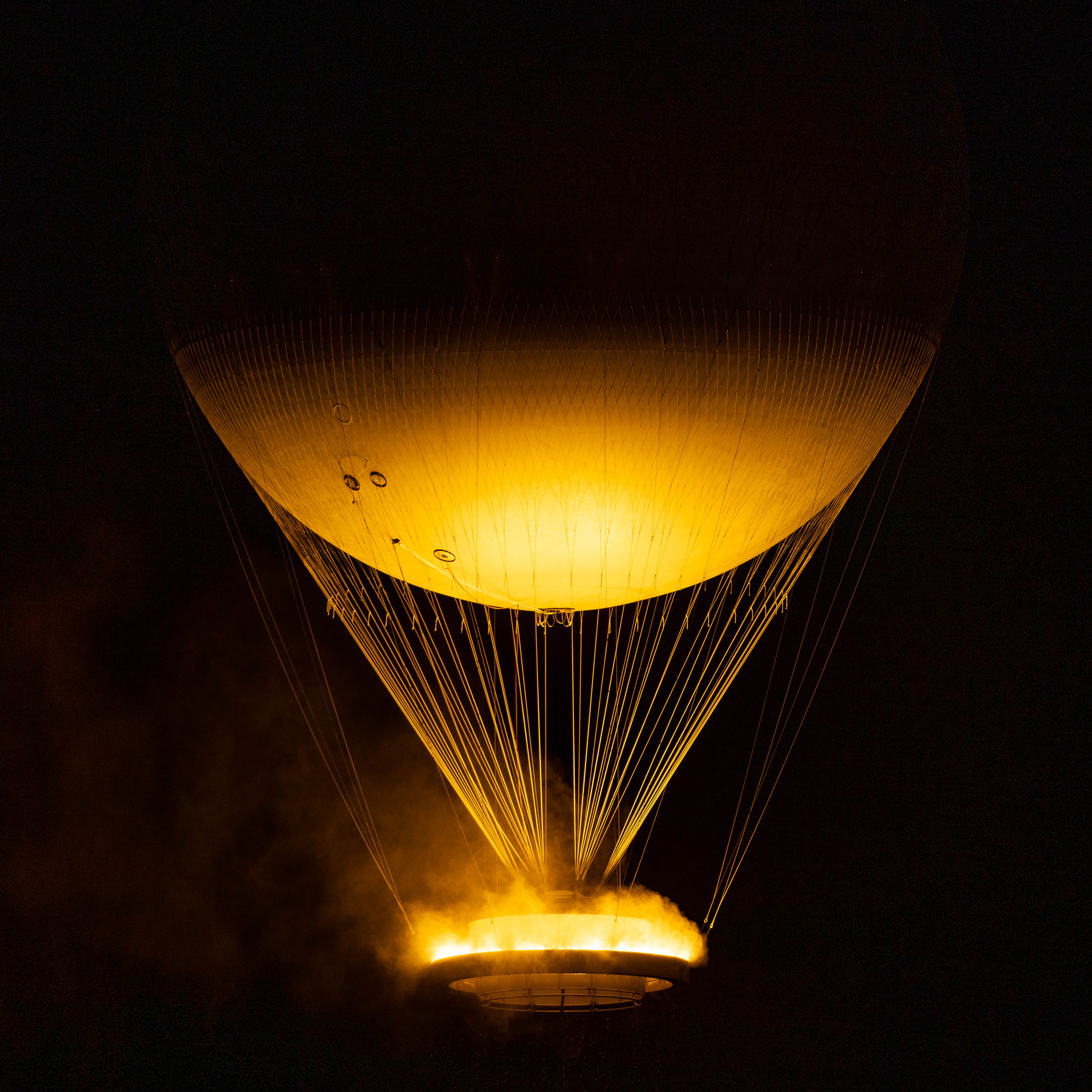
A view of the cauldron at night, with water nebulizers dissipating a small cloud of microscopic water droplets (aerosol) illuminated by LED lamps simulating artificial flames below the bottom of the tethered helium balloon.

During the Olympic opening ceremony, the ring was lit by judoka Teddy Riner and sprinter Marie-José Pérec. During the Paralympic opening ceremony, French Paralympians Alexis Hanquinquant, Nantenin Keïta, Charles-Antoine Kouakou, Fabien Lamirault, and Élodie Lorandi lit the cauldron. During the Olympics closing ceremony, the "flame" on the cauldron was turned off during an opening segment. The flame's lantern was taken from the garden to Stade de France by the swimmer Léon Marchand to the closing ceremony at Stade de France, where it was blown out at the ending of the ceremonies.

The balloon is due to be reinstated every summer up to the start of the 2028 Summer Olympics. Its first ascension after its reinstating was during a concert at Tuileries Garden as part of the 2025 Fête de la Musique.

== Reception ==
The cauldron has been acclaimed for its poetic symbolism, modern environmental consciousness, and the way it integrates French history into the global spirit of the Olympics. Parisians have lauded it as a popular landmark and have petitioned to have it institutionalized as a permanent fixture.

== Gallery ==
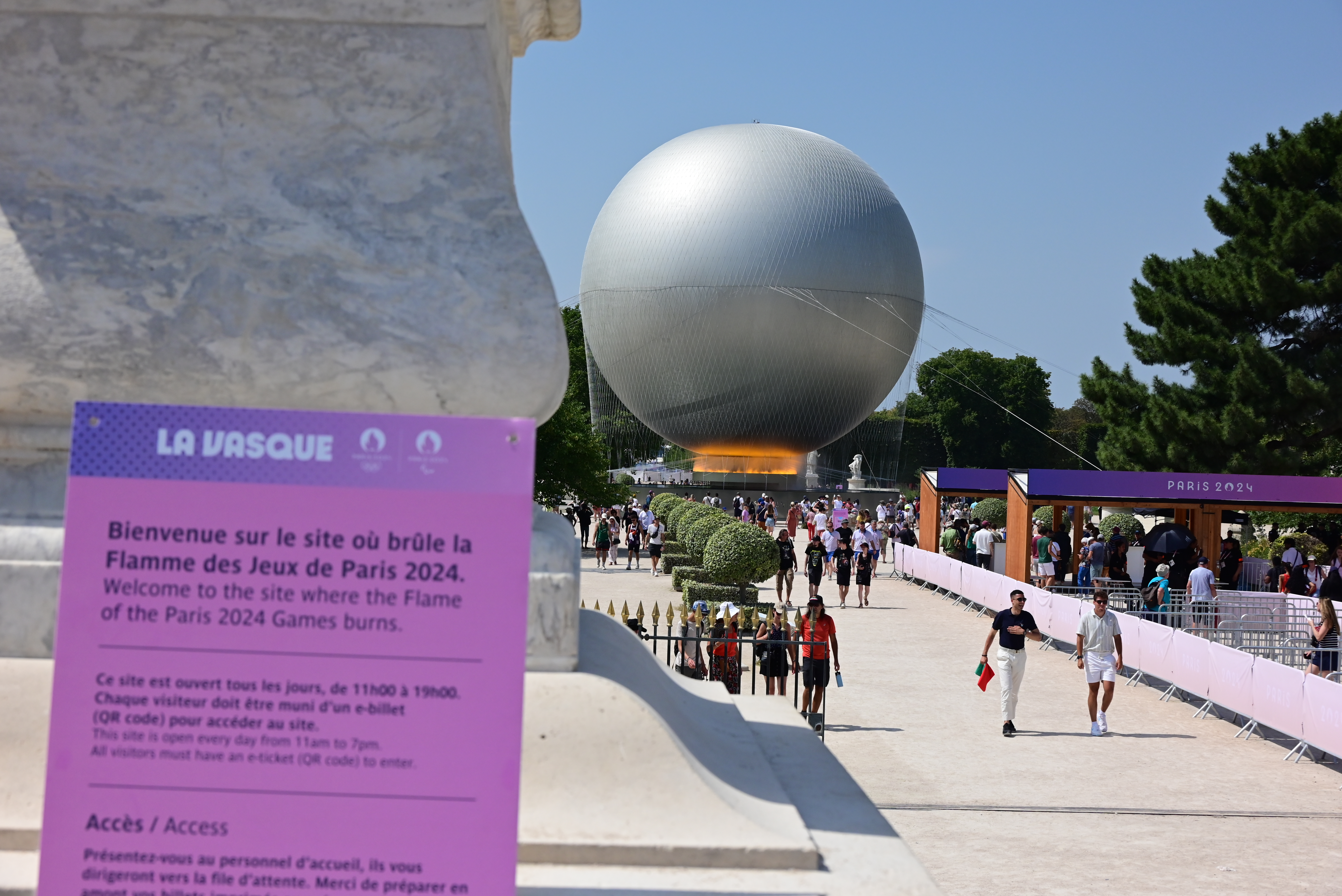

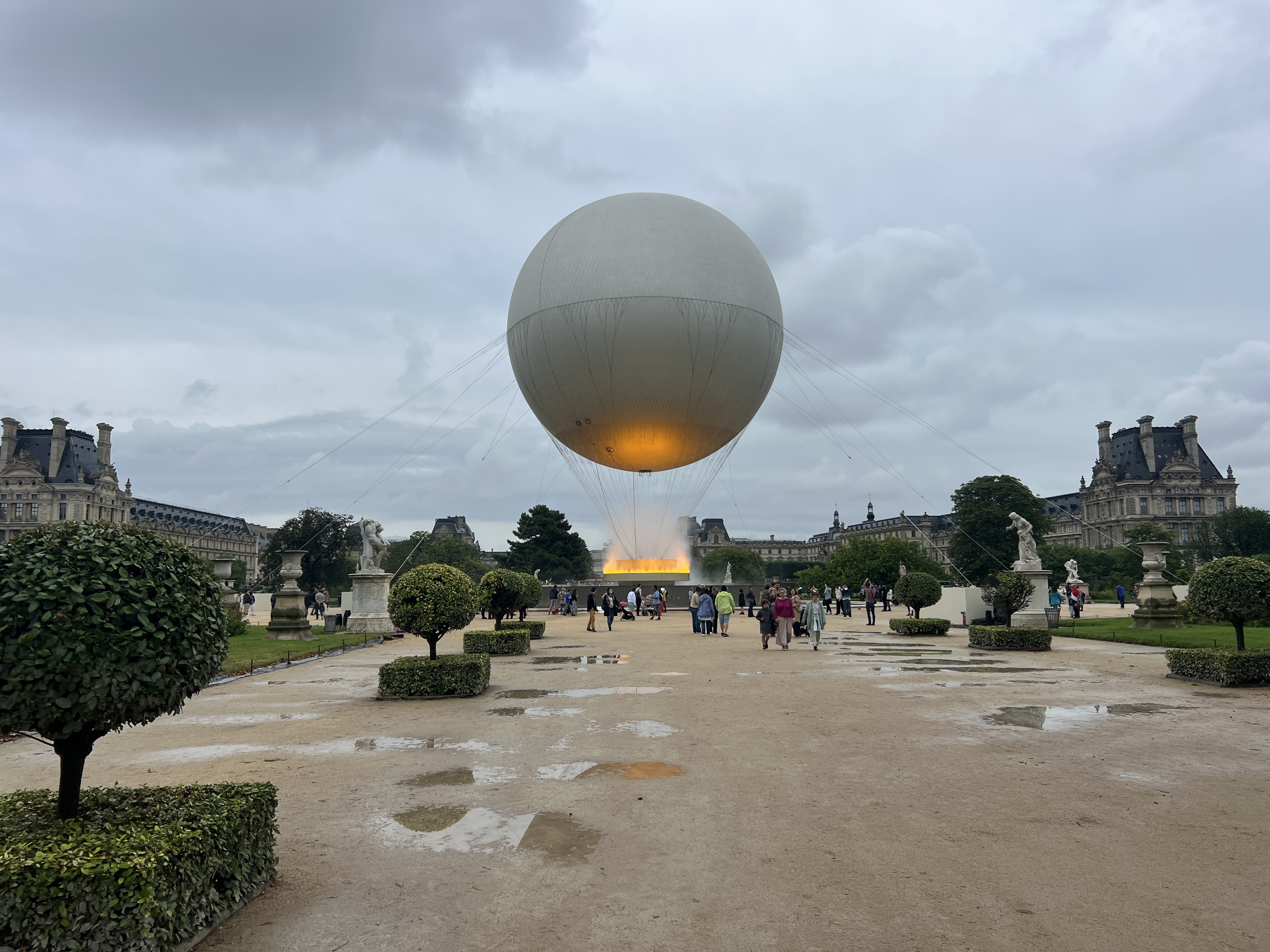

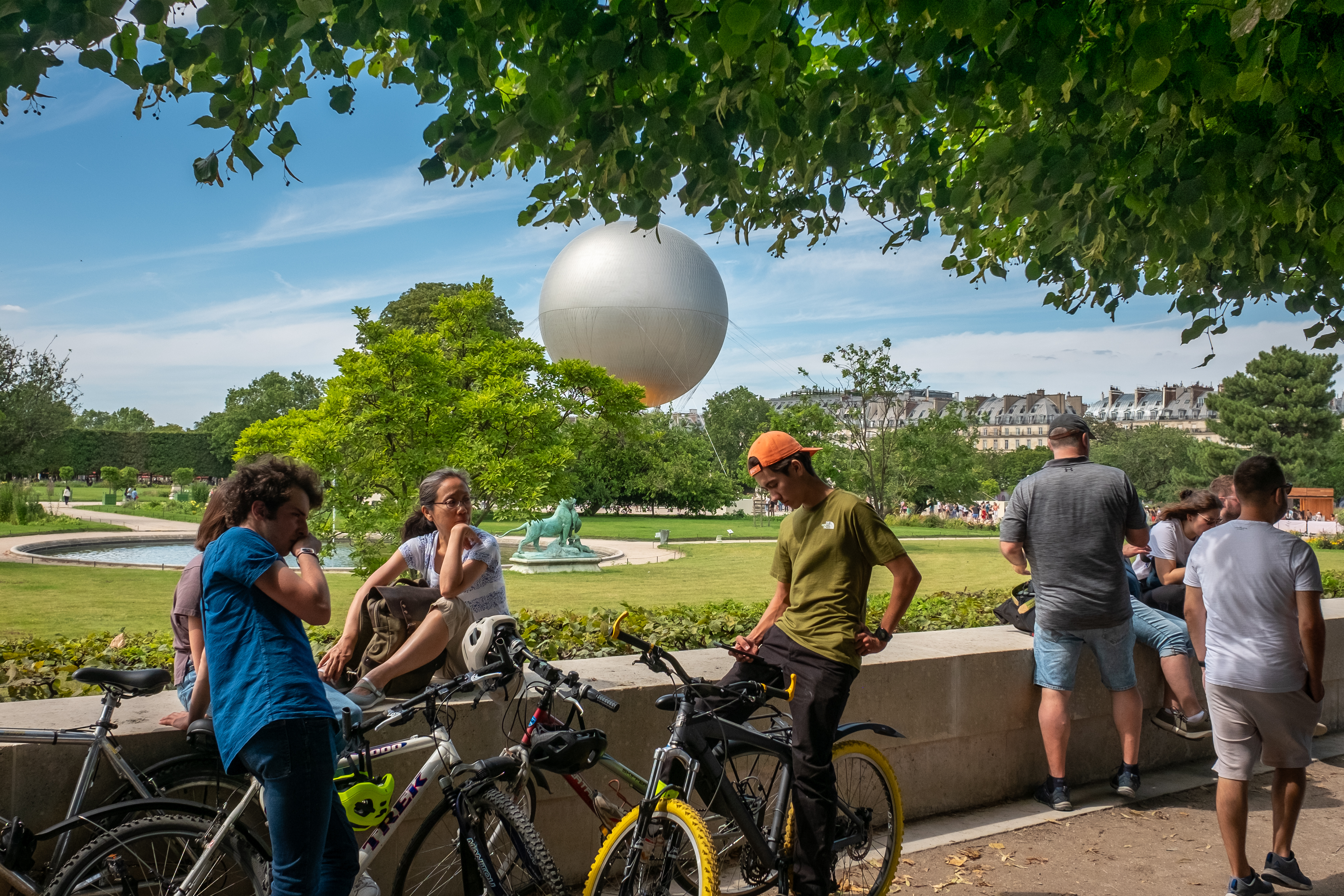

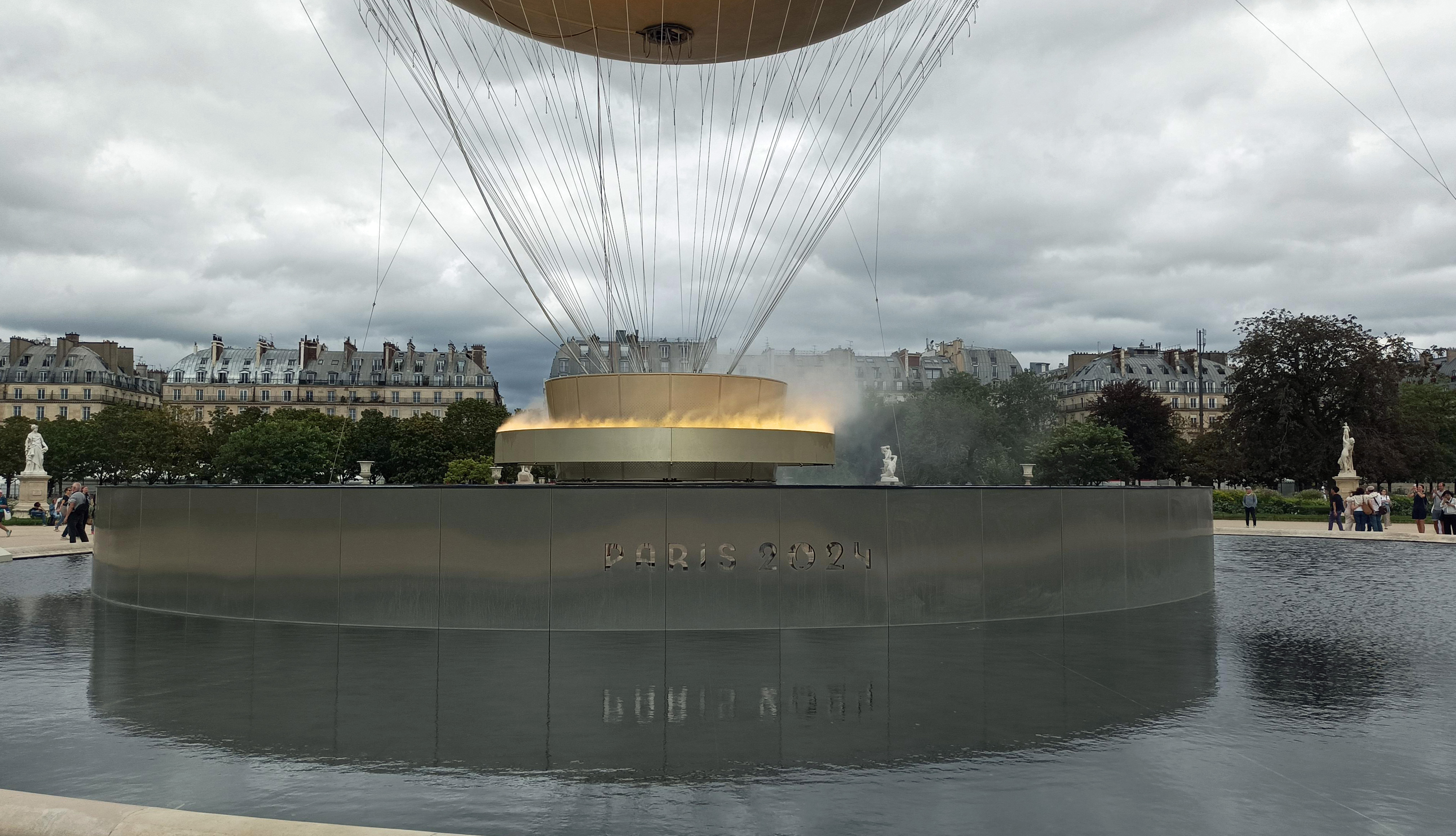

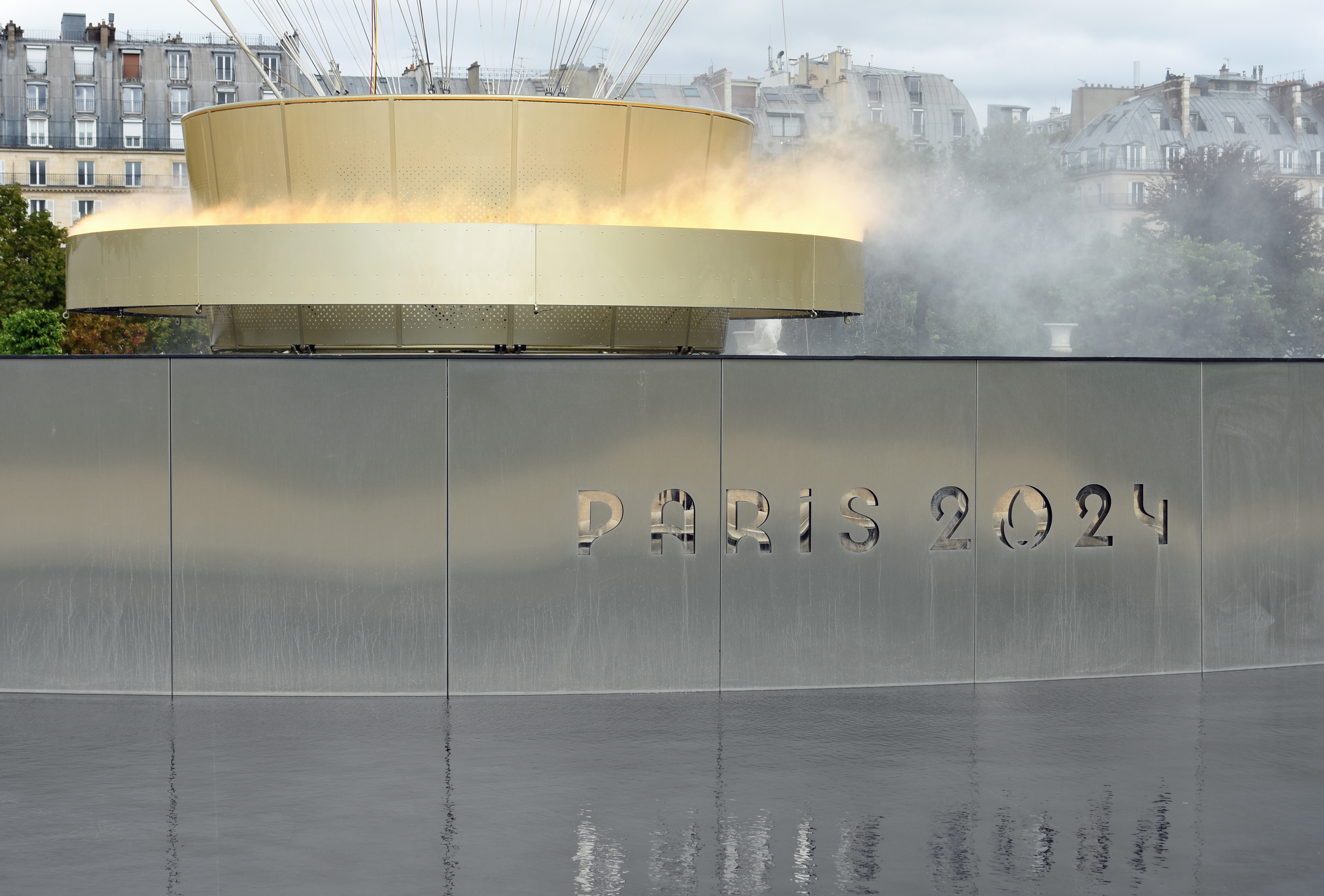

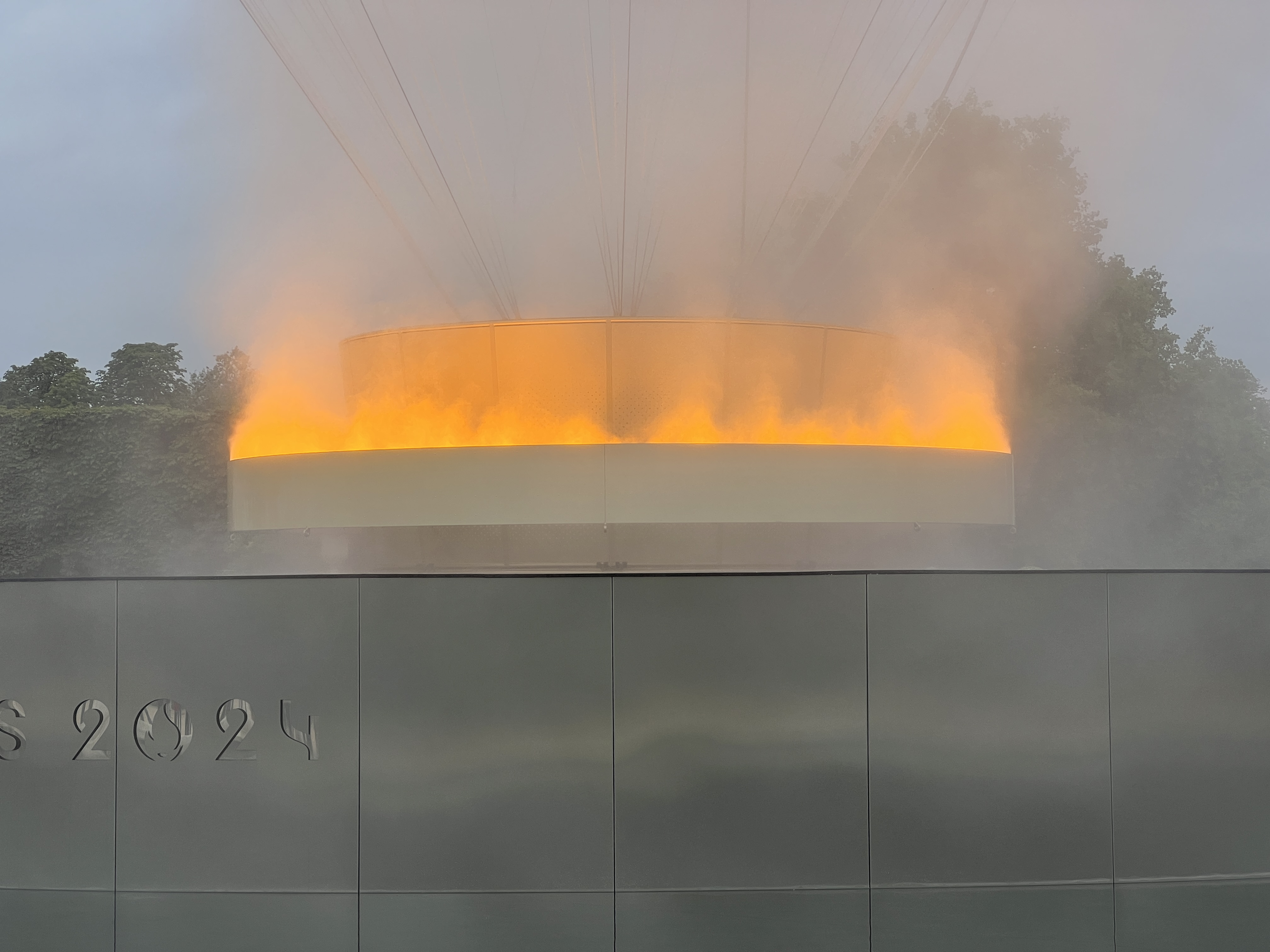

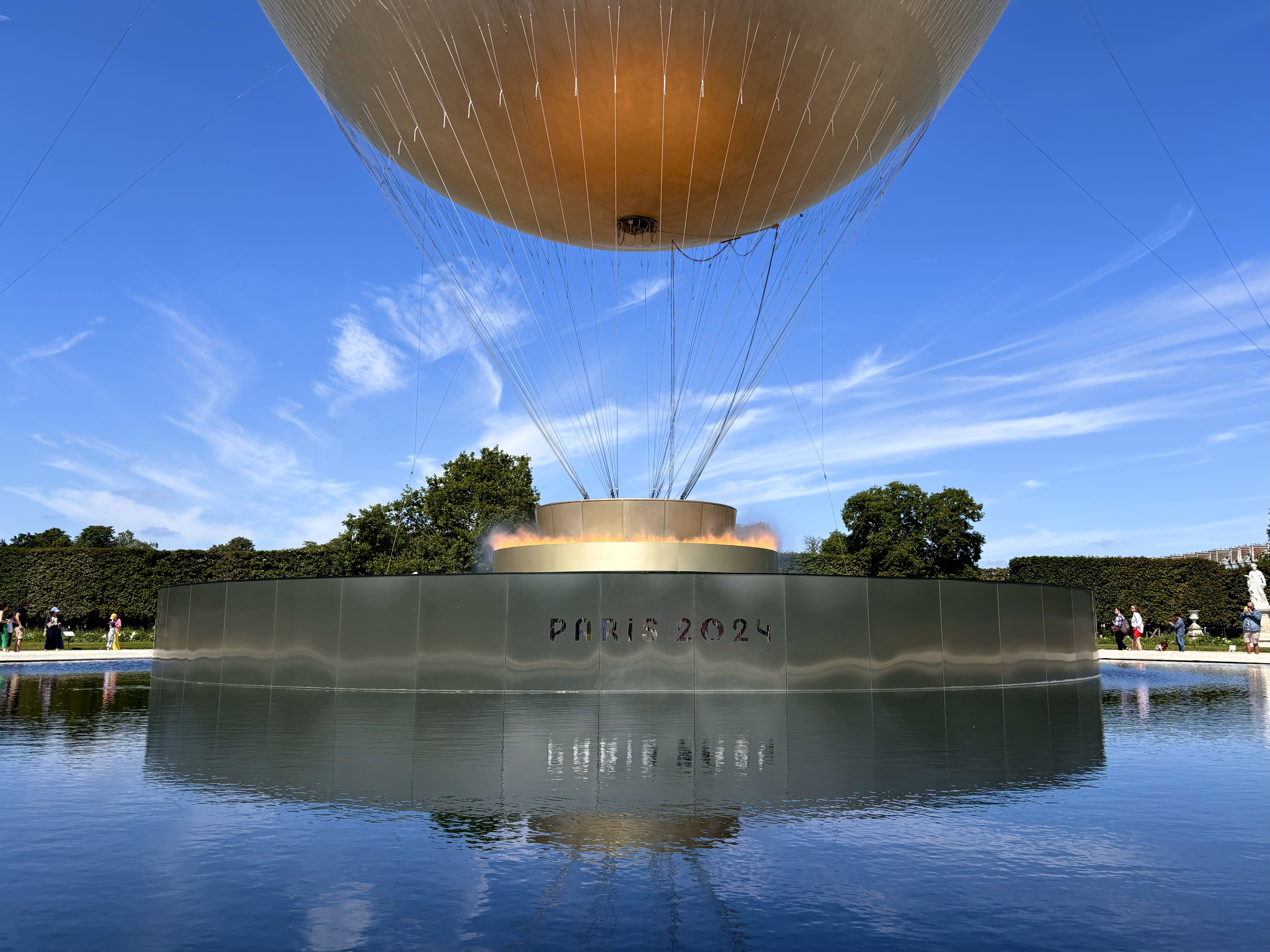

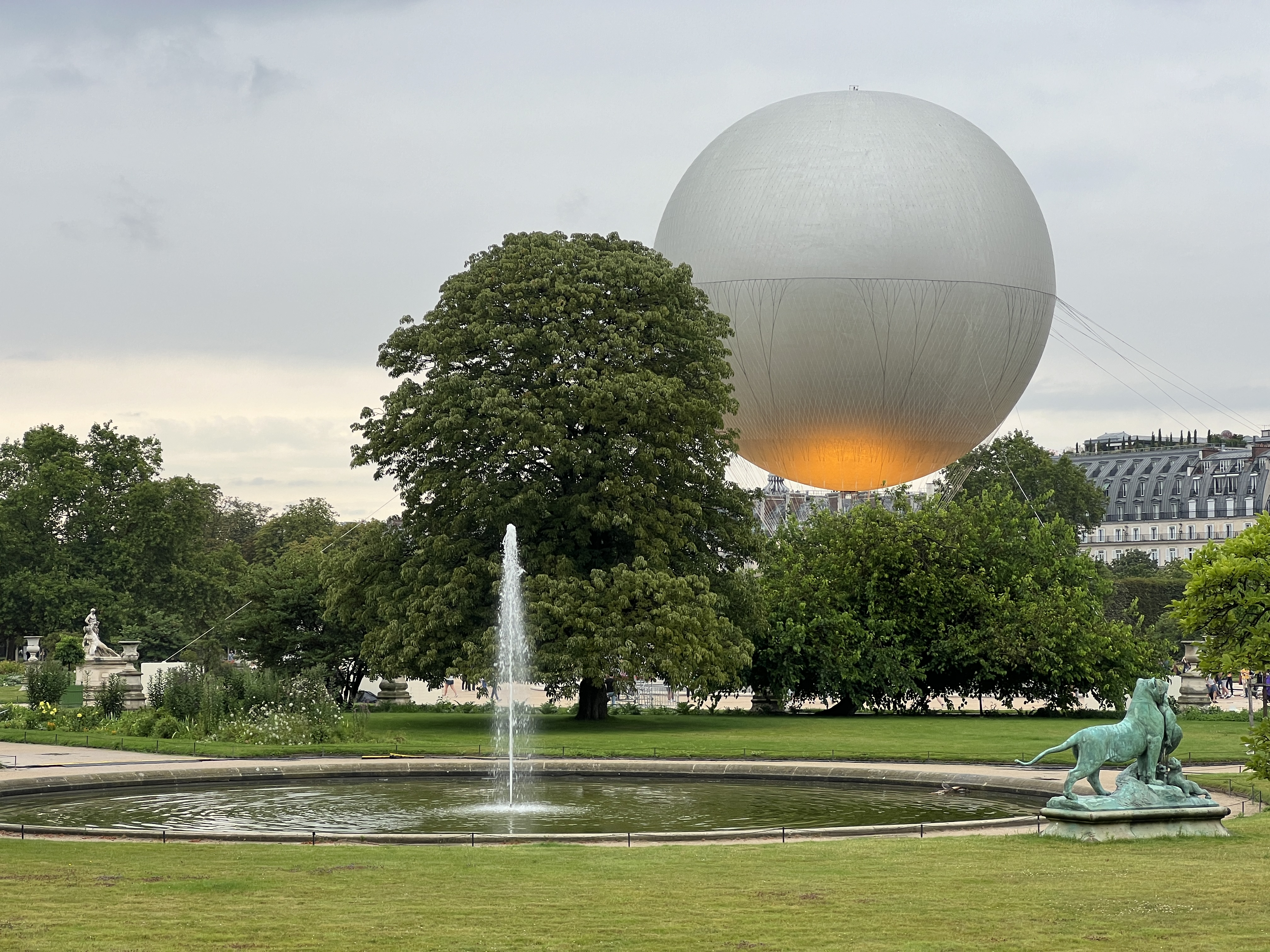
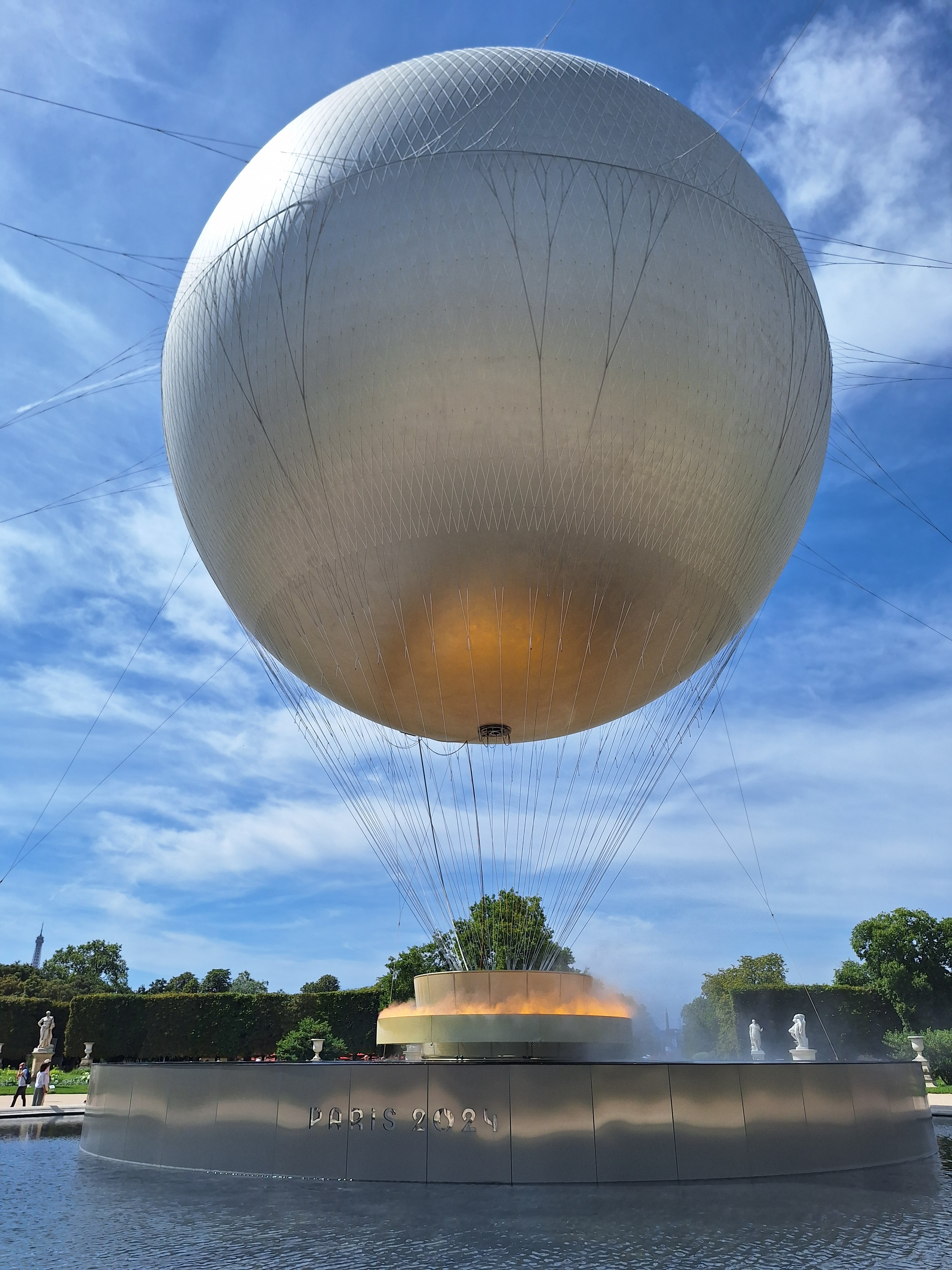

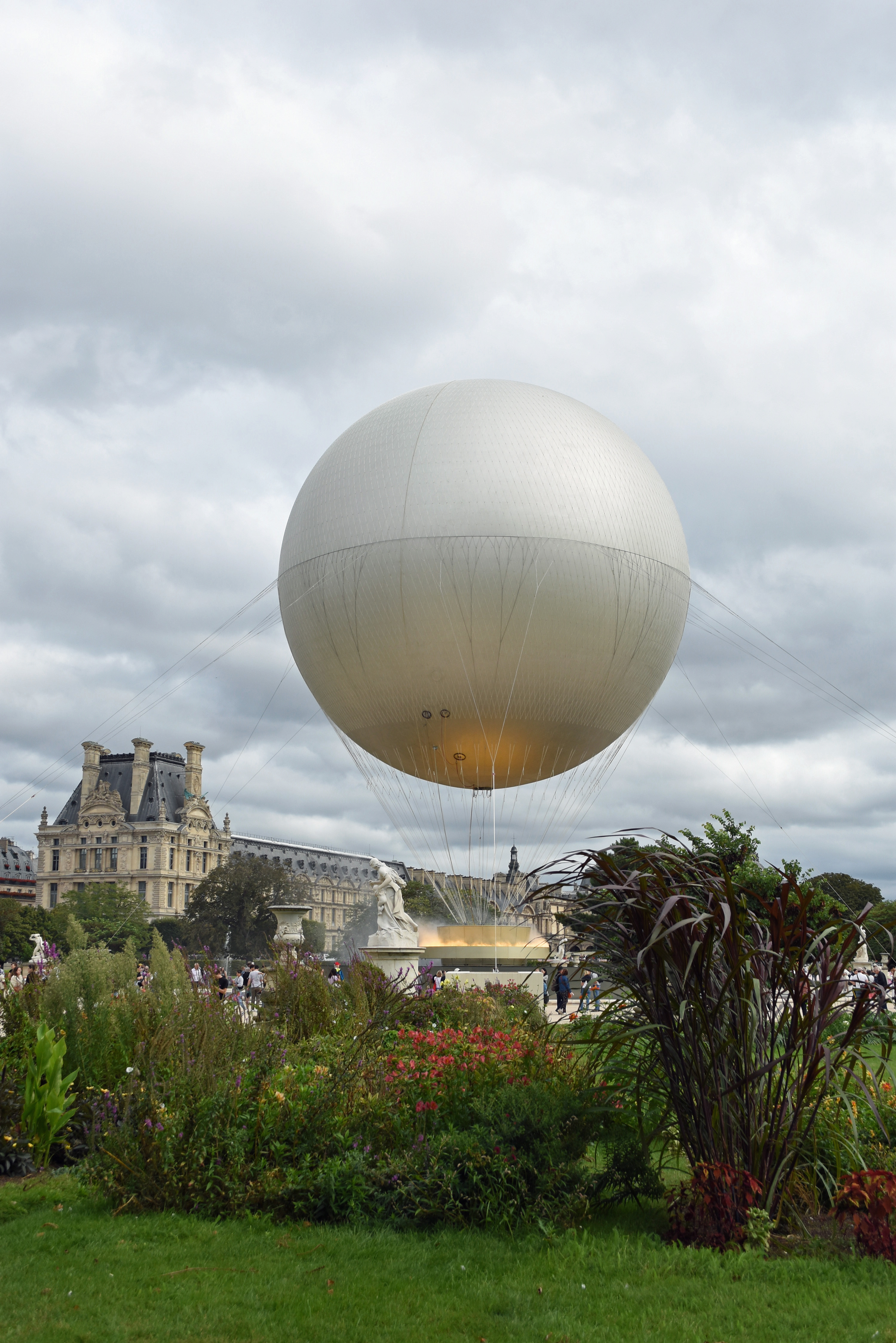

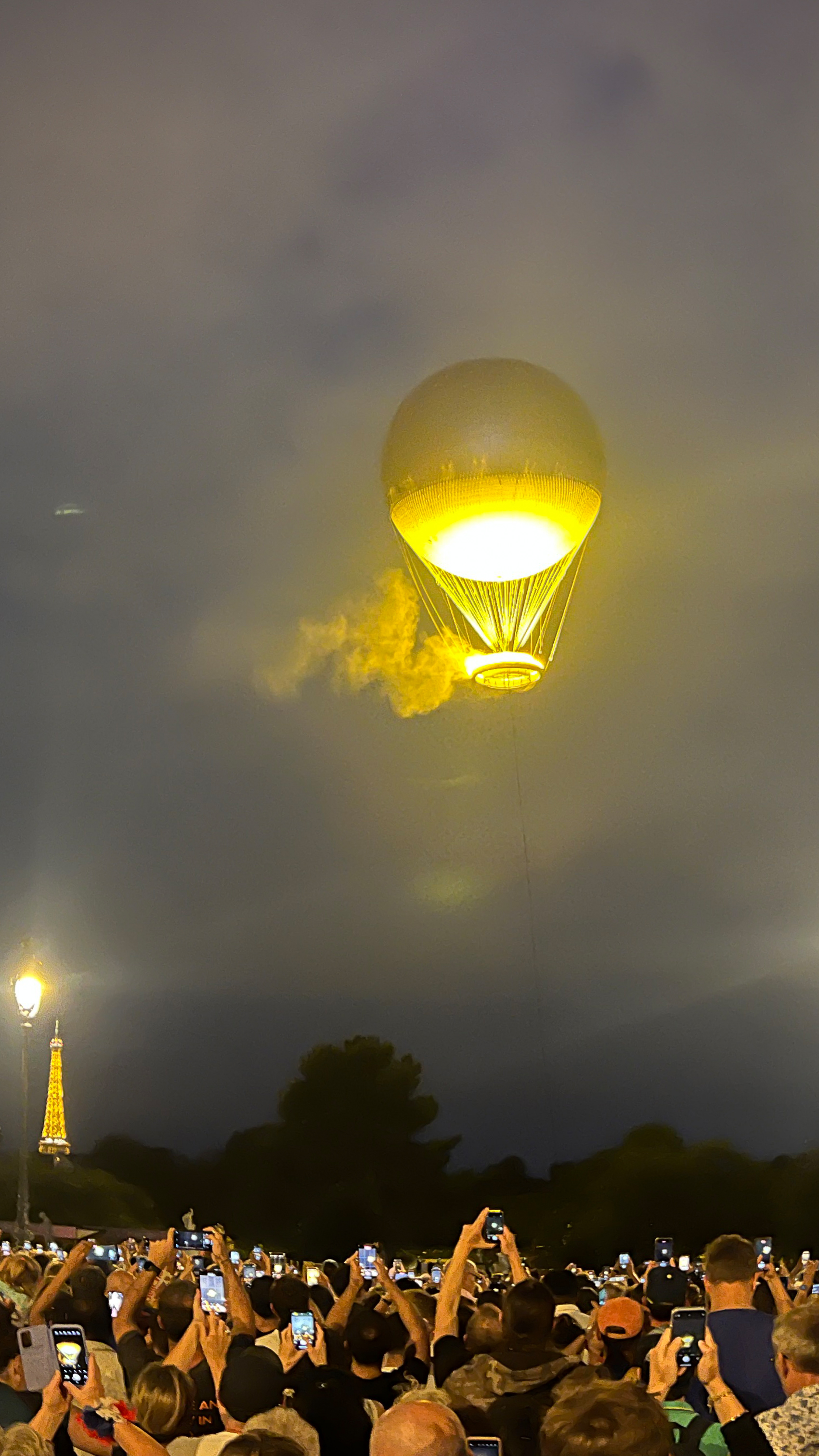

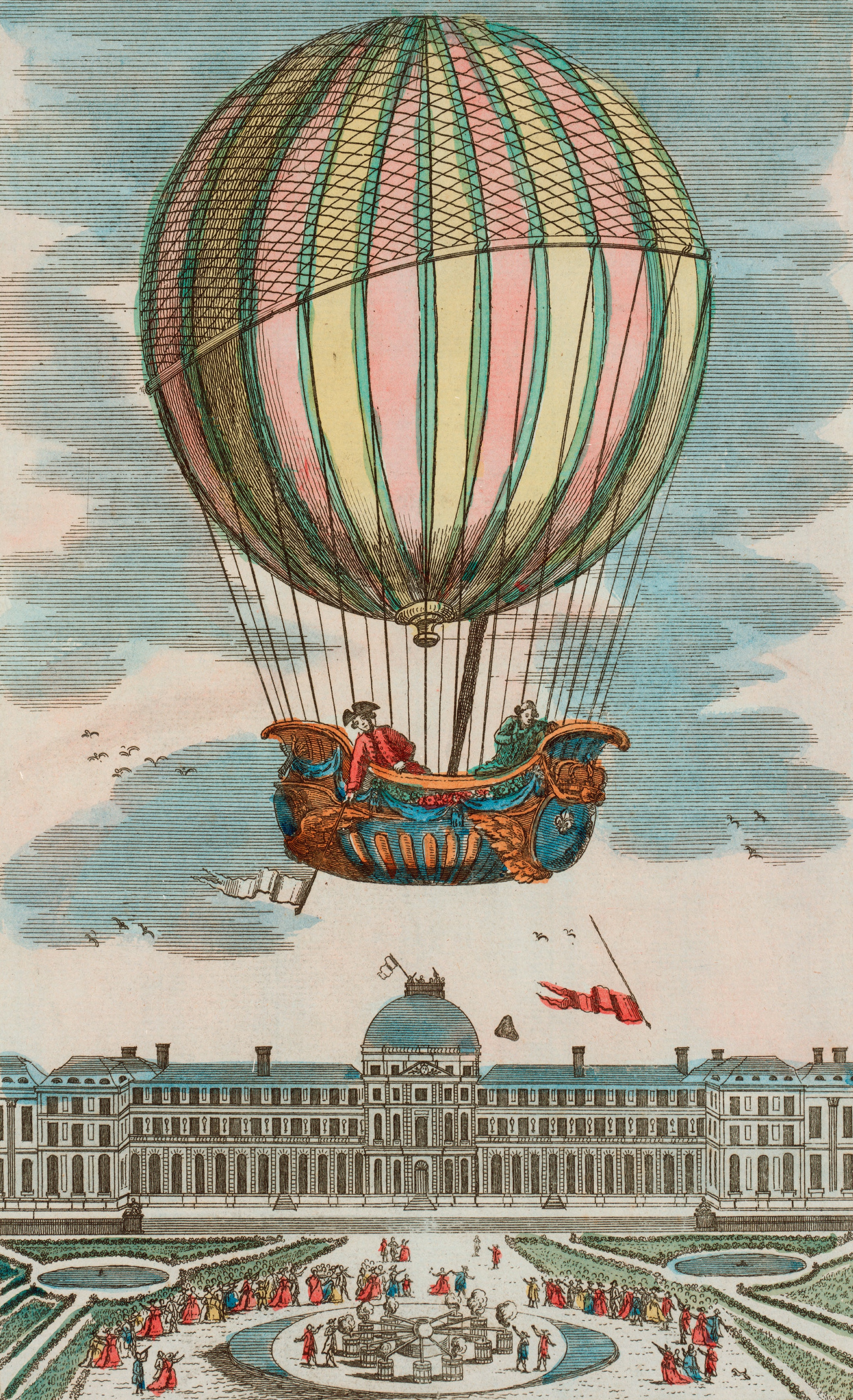
Jacques Alexandre César Charles and Marie-Noël Robert piloting in the gondola of a balloon ascending from the Tuileries Garden, Paris, France, December 1, 1783, in the first hydrogen balloon flight

== See also ==
- 2024 Summer Olympics
- 2024 Summer Paralympics
- 2024 Summer Olympics opening ceremony
- 2024 Summer Paralympics opening ceremony
- 2024 Summer Olympics torch relay
- 2024 Summer Paralympics torch relay
