= Cambodia at the Paralympics =

- IPC code: CAM
- NPC: National Centre of Disabled Persons Cambodia
- Medals: Gold 0 Silver 0 Bronze 0 Total 0

Summer appearances
- 2000; 2004; 2008; 2012; 2016; 2020; 2024

Cambodia made its Paralympic Games début at the 2000 Summer Paralympics in Sydney (sending only a men's volleyball team), and has competed in every edition of the Summer Paralympics since then. Cambodia has never taken part in the Winter Paralympics, and has never won a Paralympic medal.

== Full results for Cambodia at the Paralympics ==
Name	Games	Sport	Event	Score	Rank
Team	2000 Sydney	Volleyball	Men's standing	0–3 loss to USA; 0–3 loss to Slovakia; 1–3 loss to Israel; 0–3 loss to Germany; 1–3 loss to Poland; 3–2 win over Australia	7
Kimhor Nhork	2004 Athens	Athletics	Men's 100m T44	12.93	4th in heat 1; did not advance
Kimhor Nhork	2004 Athens	Athletics	Men's 200m T44	26.55	6th in heat 1; did not advance
Botum Pov	2004 Athens	Athletics	Women's 400m T46	1:29.37	5th in heat 1; did not advance
Vanna Kim	2008 Beijing	Athletics	Men's 100m T44	13.45	6th in heat 2; did not advance
Vanna Kim	2008 Beijing	Athletics	Men's 200m T44	28.32	5th in heat 1; did not advance
Thin Seng Hong	2012 London	Athletics	Women's 100m T44	17.35	6th in heat 2; did not advance
Thin Seng Hong	2012 London	Athletics	Women's 200m T44	DSQ	
Vun Van	2016 Rio	Athletics	Men's 100m T54	15.44	6th in heat 3; did not advance
Vun Van	2020 Tokyo	Athletics	Men's 100m T54	Heats: 14.39; Final: 14.21	2nd in heat 1; 7th in final
Vun Van	2024 Paris	Athletics	Men's 100m T54	14.58	5th in heat 1; did not advance

== See also ==
- Cambodia at the Olympics
