= The Gambia at the Paralympics =

- IPC code: GAM
- NPC: Gambia National Paralympic Committee
- Medals: Gold 0 Silver 0 Bronze 0 Total 0

Summer appearances
- 2012; 2016; 2020; 2024

The Gambia made its Paralympic Games début at the 2012 Summer Paralympics in London, sending two wheelchair athletes to compete in track events. The country was initially due to send two athletes to the 2008 Summer Games, but withdrew before the Games began.

The Gambia has never taken part in the Winter Paralympic Games, and no Gambian athlete has ever won a Paralympic medal.

== Full results for the Gambia at the Paralympics ==
Name	Games	Sport	Event	Score	Rank
Demba Jarju	2012 London	Athletics	Men's 100 m T54	18.84	7th in heat 3; did not advance
Demba Jarju	2012 London	Athletics	Men's 800 m T54	2:27.88	8th in heat 2; did not advance
Isatou Nyang	2012 London	Athletics	Women's 100 m T54	20.32	6th in heat 1; did not advance
Isatou Nyang	2012 London	Athletics	Women's 100 m T54	DQ	dq in heat 1; did not advance
Demba Jarju	2016 Rio	Athletics	Men's 100 m T54	18.82	7th in heat 1; did not advance
Malang Tamba	2024 Paris	Athletics	Men's 100 m T54	18.13	7th in heat 1; did not advance
Fatou Sanneh	2024 Paris	Athletics	Women's 100 m T54	DNS	

== See also ==
- The Gambia at the Olympics
