= Gabon at the Paralympics =

- IPC code: GAB
- NPC: Federation Gabonaise Omnisports pour Paralympique pour Handicapées
- Medals: Gold 0 Silver 0 Bronze 0 Total 0

Summer appearances
- 2008; 2012; 2016; 2020; 2024

Gabon made its Paralympic Games début at the 2008 Summer Paralympics in Beijing, sending a single athlete (wheelchair athlete Thierry Mabicka) to compete in track and field. Mabicka entered two events: the 800m race (T54 category), and the javelin (F57/58). In the former, he was disqualified, apparently "for attempting to race others with a non-racing wheelchair". In the latter, he finished last of fourteen, his throw of 11.72m earning him 302 points.

== Full results for Gabon at the Paralympics ==
Name	Games	Sport	Event	Score	Rank
Thierry Mabicka	2008 Beijing	Athletics	Men's 800m T54	DSQ	DSQ in heat 4; did not advance
Thierry Mabicka	2008 Beijing	Athletics	Men's Javelin F57/58	11.72m => 302pts	14th (out of 14)
Thierry Mabicka	2012 London	Athletics	Men's 100m T54	21.42	8th in heat 3; did not advance
Thierry Mabicka	2012 London	Athletics	Men's Javelin F57/58	DNS	
Edmond Ngombi	2016 Rio	Athletics	Men's 100m T54	18.79	6th in heat 1; did not advance
Davy Rendhel Moukagni Moukagni	2020 Tokyo	Athletics	Men's 100m T47	12.12	8th in heat 1; did not advance
Audrey Fabiola Mengue Pambo	2020 Tokyo	Athletics	Women's Shot put F57	4.18m	17th (out of 20)
Davy Rendhel Moukagni Moukagni	2024 Paris	Athletics	Men's 100m T47	12.90	8th in heat 2; did not advance
Audrey Fabiola Mengue Pambo	2024 Paris	Athletics	Women's Shot put F57	4.91m	17th (out of 20)

== See also ==
- Gabon at the Olympics
