= Tanzania at the 1992 Summer Paralympics =

- IPC code: TAN
- NPC: Tanzania Paralympic Committee external link

in Barcelona
- Competitors: 1 in 1 sport
- Medals: Gold 0 Silver 0 Bronze 0 Total 0

Summer Paralympics appearances (overview)
- 1992; 1996–2000; 2004; 2008; 2012; 2016; 2020; 2024

Tanzania competed at the 1992 Summer Paralympics in Barcelona, Spain from September 3 to September 14, 1992.

== Team ==
Tanzania sent one sportsperson to the Barcelona Games, table tennis player Noorel Sharriff.

== Table tennis ==
Sharriff competed in the Men's Open 6-10 event. He lost to Spain's Javier Mosteirin 0 - 2 and was eliminated from the Games.

== See also ==
- Tanzania at the 1992 Summer Olympics
