= Disability in Cambodia =

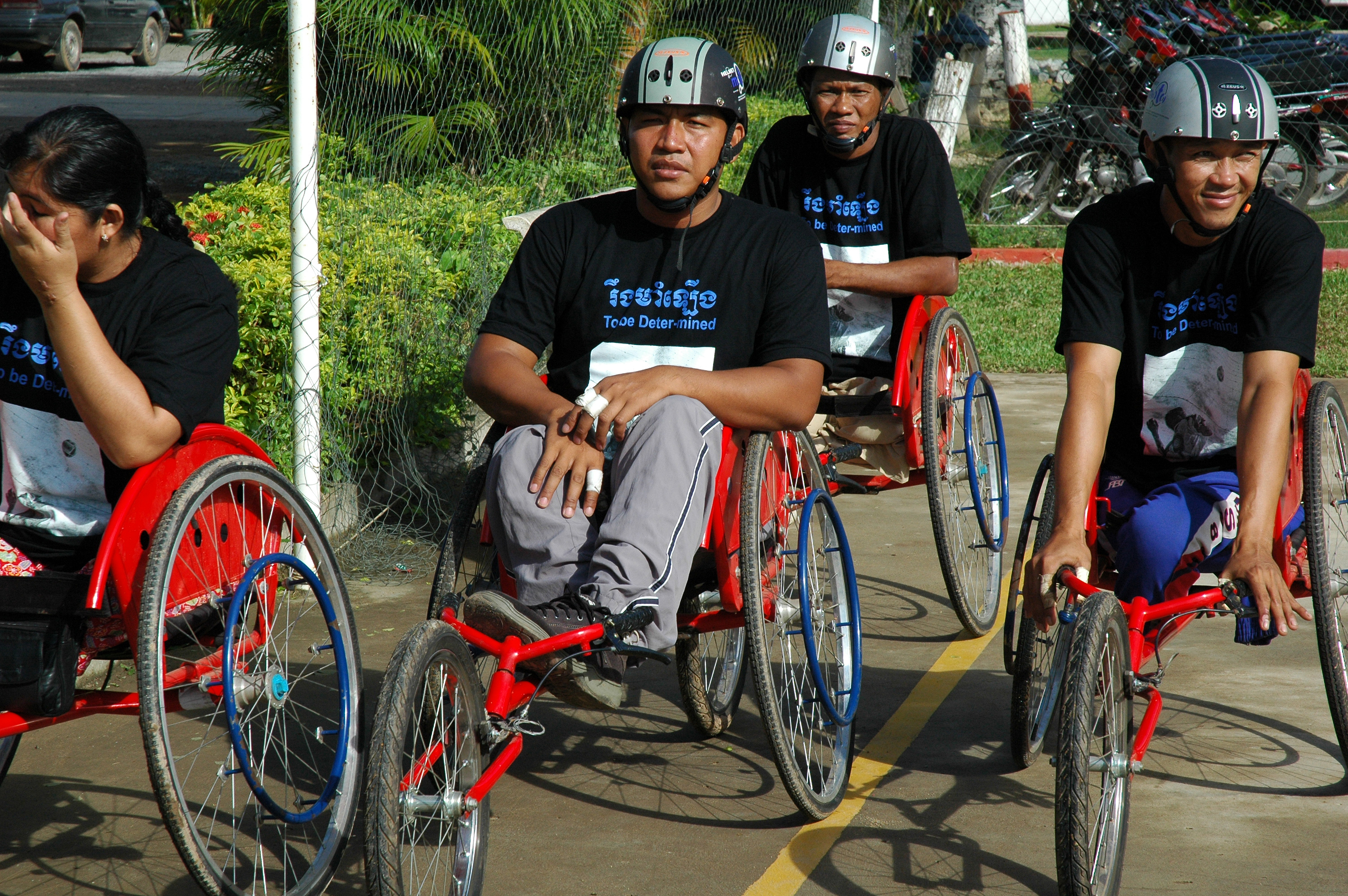
Disabled volleyball team of Cambodia

As of 2019, there were 4.9% people of Cambodia aged 5 years and above with varying degrees of disability.

== History ==
Cambodia has ratified the United Nations Convention on the Rights of Persons with Disabilities and Marrakesh VIP Treaty.

== Economy ==
In 2019, there were 2,860 people with disabilities employed by the government of Cambodia.

== See also ==
- Cambodia at the Paralympics
