= Disability in Gabon =

About 27,100 people live with disabilities in Gabon

Disability in Gabon refers to the people with disability in Gabon.

== History ==
In 1995, Gabon introduced a law that requires all buildings and public roads be accessible to those with disabilities. The country ratified the Convention on the Rights of Persons with Disabilities in 2007. It 2014, it ratified the convention's Optional Protocol.

== Statistics ==
As of 2015, 2% of Gabon's population had a varying degrees of disability, which accounted for 27,100 people.

== See also ==
- Gabon at the Paralympics
