= Gabon at the 2008 Summer Paralympics =

- IPC code: GAB
- NPC: Federation Gabonaise Omnisports pour Paralympique pour Handicapées

in Beijing
- Competitors: 1 in 1 sport
- Medals: Gold 0 Silver 0 Bronze 0 Total 0

Summer Paralympics appearances (overview)
- 2008; 2012; 2016; 2020; 2024

Gabon sent a delegation to compete at the 2008 Summer Paralympics in Beijing, People's Republic of China. It was Gabon's first participation in the Paralympic Games.

The country was represented solely by wheelchair athlete Thierry Mabicka, in track and field. Mabicka entered two events: the 800m race (T54 category), and the javelin (F57/58). In the former, he was disqualified, apparently "for attempting to race others with a non-racing wheelchair". In the latter, he finished last of fourteen, his throw of 11.72m earning him 302 points.

== Results ==
Name	Sport	Event	Score	Rank
Thierry Mabicka	Athletics	Men's 800m T54	DSQ	DSQ in heat 4; did not advance
Thierry Mabicka	Athletics	Men's Javelin F57/58	11.72m => 302pts	14th (out of 14)

== See also ==
- Gabon at the Paralympics
- Gabon at the 2008 Summer Olympics
