= Juan Pablo Cervantes García =

Mexican Paralympic athlete (born 1992)

Juan Pablo Cervantes
Personal information
- Full name: Juan Pablo Cervantes García
- Born: 23 June 1992 (age 34) Mexico City, Mexico

Sport
- Country: Mexico
- Sport: Paralympic athletics
- Disability class: T54
Medal record
Men's parathletism
Representing Mexico
Summer Paralympics
Gold medal – first place	2024 Paris	100 m T54
Bronze medal – third place	2020 Tokyo	100m T54
World Championships
Bronze medal – third place	2019 Dubai	100m T54
Bronze medal – third place	2024 Kobe	100m T54
Parapan American Games
Gold medal – first place	2019 Lima	100m T54
Gold medal – first place	2019 Lima	400m T54

Juan Pablo Cervantes García (born 23 June 1992) is a Mexican Paralympic athlete.

== Career ==
He represented Mexico at the 2020 Summer Paralympics, where he won a bronze medal in the 100 meters T54 event. Formerly a wheelchair basketballer, Cervantes García changed to parathletism after his coach suggested him to do it. He first represented the country at the Paralympics in London 2012, where he competed in the 100 m T54, 400 m T54 and 4 × 400 m T53–T54 events, but did not classify in any.
