= The Gambia at the 2016 Summer Paralympics =

- IPC code: GAM
- NPC: Gambia National Paralympic Committee

in Rio de Janeiro
- Competitors: 1 in 1 sports
- Flag bearer: Demba Jarju
- Medals: Gold 0 Silver 0 Bronze 0 Total 0

Summer Paralympics appearances (overview)
- 2012; 2016; 2020; 2024

The Gambia sent a delegation to compete at the 2016 Summer Paralympics in Rio de Janeiro, Brazil, from 7–18 September 2016. This was the nation's second appearance at the Paralympics, following their first participation in the 2012 London Paralympics. The Gambia sent one athlete, Demba Jarju, who failed to advance from his heat in the men's 100 meters T54 event.

== Background ==
The Gambia had debuted in the 2012 Summer Paralympics competition, but have never won a Paralympic medal. The Gambia has participated in every Summer Olympic Games since the 1984 Los Angeles Games. The 2016 Summer Paralympics were held from 7–18 September 2016, and 4,328 athletes representing 159 National Paralympic Committees participated. The only athlete sent by the Gambia to Rio was Demba Jarju. He was chosen as the flag bearer for the opening ceremony.

== Disability classifications ==
Every participant at the Paralympics has their disability grouped into one of five disability categories: amputation, which may be congenital or sustained through injury or illness; cerebral palsy; wheelchair athletes, though there is often overlap between this and other categories; visual impairment, including blindness; and Les Autres, which is any physical disability that does not fall strictly under one of the other categories, like dwarfism or multiple sclerosis. Each Paralympic sport then has its classifications, dependent upon the specific physical demands of competition. Events are given a code made of numbers and letters describing the type of event and classification of the athletes competing. Some sports, such as athletics, divide athletes by the category and severity of their disabilities. Other sports, for example, swimming, group competitors from different categories together, the only separation being based on the severity of the disability.

== Athletics ==
Demba Jarju was 27 years old at the time of the Rio Paralympics. He made his second Paralympic, having first represented The Gambia at the 2012 Summer Paralympics. He lost the use of both legs from contracting polio at the age of ten and races in a wheelchair. He qualified for these Paralympics at an event in Morocco. On 16 September, he competed in the men's 100 meters T54 heats. Drawn into the first heat, he completed the race with a time of 18.82 seconds, which put him seventh and last in his heat, and therefore unable to advance to the final eight. Leo-Pekka Tähti of Finland ultimately won the gold medal, the silver medal by China's Liu Yang, and the bronze medal was taken by Kenny van Weeghel of the Netherlands.

| Athlete | Events | Heat | | Final | |
| Athlete | Events | Time | Rank | Time | Rank |
|---|---|---|---|---|---|
| Demba Jarju | 100 m T54 | 18.82 | 7 | did not advance | |

== See also ==
- The Gambia at the 2016 Summer Olympics
