= Gabon at the 2016 Summer Paralympics =

- IPC code: GAB
- NPC: Federation Gabonaise Omnisports pour Paralympique pour Handicapées

in Rio de Janeiro
- Competitors: 1 in 1 sport
- Flag bearer: Edmond Ngombi
- Medals: Gold 0 Silver 0 Bronze 0 Total 0

Summer Paralympics appearances (overview)
- 2008; 2012; 2016; 2020; 2024

Gabon sent a delegation to compete at the 2016 Summer Paralympics in Rio de Janeiro, Brazil, from 7–18 September 2016. This was the nation's third appearance at a Summer Paralympic Games, following their two previous participations at the 2008 Summer Paralympics and the 2012 Summer Paralympics. Gabon sent a sole athlete to represent them at Rio de Janeiro, wheelchair racer Edmond Ngombi. He did not advance from his heat in the men's 100 metres T54 event as he came sixth out of seven competitors and attributed the result to a handlebar problem.

== Background ==
Gabon first entered Paralympic competition at the 2008 Summer Paralympics and have appeared in every Summer Paralympic Games since. Thus, Rio de Janeiro was the country's third time competing at a Summer Paralympiad. The nation has never won a medal at the Paralympic Games. The 2016 Summer Paralympics were held from 7–18 September 2016 with a total of 4,328 athletes representing 159 National Paralympic Committees taking part. Gabon was represented by a sole athlete, Edmond Ngombi, a short-distance wheelchair racer. He was accompanied by his coach Guy Gaétan Ntoutoume Endenda and international classifier Astride Koumba. Ngombi was selected to be the flag bearer for the parade of nations during the opening ceremony.

== Disability classifications ==
Every participant at the Paralympics has their disability grouped into one of five disability categories; amputation, the condition may be congenital or sustained through injury or illness; cerebral palsy; wheelchair athletes, there is often overlap between this and other categories; visual impairment, including blindness; Les autres, any physical disability that does not fall strictly under one of the other categories, for example dwarfism or multiple sclerosis. Each Paralympic sport then has its own classifications, dependent upon the specific physical demands of competition. Events are given a code, made of numbers and letters, describing the type of event and classification of the athletes competing. Some sports, such as athletics, divide athletes by both the category and severity of their disabilities, other sports, for example swimming, group competitors from different categories together, the only separation being based on the severity of the disability.

== Athletics ==
Edmond Ngombi contracted polio at an early age, and lost the use of both his legs, resulting in him using a wheelchair in competition. He is classified T54 by the International Paralympic Committee. The Rio Summer Paralympics were his second significant international competition, after the 2015 African Games, and he was 39 years old at the time of the Games. To compete at the Games, he received an invitation from the Bipartite Commission because his fastest time of 18.34 at the 2015 African Games was 3.19 seconds slower than the "B" qualifying standard for his event, the men's 100 metres T54. On 16 September, Ngombi competed in the heats of the men's 100 meters T54. Assigned to compete against seven other athletes in heat one, he completed the race in 18.79 seconds, which put him sixth. Nogmbi failed to qualify for the final since he was 19th overall and only the top eight advanced to that stage of the competition. After the Paralympics, he said his performance was hindered by a handlebar problem on his wheelchair and revealed that he exceeded his expectations.

Men's Track

Athlete	Events	Heat		Final	
Athlete	Events	Time	Rank	Time	Rank
Edmond Ngombi	100 m T54	18.79	6	did not advance	

== See also ==
- Gabon at the 2016 Summer Olympics
