= Gabon at the 2012 Summer Paralympics =

- IPC code: GAB
- NPC: Federation Gabonaise Omnisports pour Paralympique pour Handicapées

in London
- Competitors: 1 in 1 sport
- Medals: Gold 0 Silver 0 Bronze 0 Total 0

Summer Paralympics appearances (overview)
- 2008; 2012; 2016; 2020; 2024

Gabon competed at the 2012 Summer Paralympics in London, United Kingdom from August 29 to September 9, 2012.

== Athletics ==
Men’s track

Athlete	Event	Heat		Final	
Athlete	Event	Result	Rank	Result	Rank
Thierry Mabicka	100m T54	21.42	8	Did not advance	

Men’s field

Athlete	Event	Final	
Athlete	Event	Distance	Rank
Thierry Mabicka	Javelin throw F57-58	DNS	

== See also ==
- Gabon at the Paralympics
- Gabon at the 2012 Summer Olympics
