= Tanzania at the Paralympics =

- IPC code: TAN
- NPC: Tanzania Paralympic Committee external link
- Medals: Gold 0 Silver 0 Bronze 0 Total 0

Summer appearances
- 1992; 1996–2000; 2004; 2008; 2012; 2016; 2020; 2024

Tanzania made its Paralympic Games début at the 1992 Summer Paralympics in Barcelona. It was represented by a single competitor, male tennis player Noorelain sharrif. The country was then absent from the Paralympics until 2004, when it sent two runners: Willbert Costantino in the men's 800m race, and Mwanaidi Ng Itu in the women's 100m and 200m sprints. In 2008, Tanzania's sole competitor was Justine Ernest, in the men's shot put.

No Tanzanian has ever won a Paralympic medal, and Tanzania has never participated in the Winter Paralympics.

== See also ==
- Tanzania at the Olympics
- Disability in Tanzania
