= The Gambia at the 2024 Summer Paralympics =

- IPC code: GAM
- NPC: Gambia National Paralympic Committee

in Paris, France August 28, 2024 – September 8, 2024
- Competitors: 2 (1 man and 1 woman) in 1 sport
- Flag bearers: Fatou Sanneh; Malang Tamba
- Medals: Gold 0 Silver 0 Bronze 0 Total 0

Summer Paralympics appearances (overview)
- 2012; 2016; 2020; 2024

The Gambia competed at the 2024 Summer Paralympics in Paris, France, from 28 August to 8 September 2024. This was the nation's fourth time competing at the Summer Paralympic Games after it made its debut at the 2012 Summer Paralympics. The delegation consisted of two competitors from one sport.

== Competitors ==
The following is the list of number of competitors in the Games.

Sport	Men	Women	Total
Athletics	1	1	2
Total	1	1	2

== Athletics ==
Athlete	Event	Heat		Final	
Athlete	Event	Result	Rank	Result	Rank
Fatou Sanneh	Women's 100 metres T54	DNS			
Malang Tamba	Men's 100 metres T54	18.13	7	Did not advance	

== See also ==
- The Gambia at the 2024 Summer Olympics
- The Gambia at the Paralympics
