= Tanzania at the 2020 Summer Paralympics =

- IPC code: TAN
- NPC: Tanzania Paralympic Committee external link

in Tokyo
- Competitors: 2 in 1 sports
- Medals: Gold 0 Silver 0 Bronze 0 Total 0

Summer Paralympics appearances (overview)
- 1992; 1996–2000; 2004; 2008; 2012; 2016; 2020; 2024

Tanzania competed at the 2020 Summer Paralympics in Tokyo, Japan, from 23 July to 8 August 2021. This was the country's sixth appearance in the Summer Paralympics since debuting at the 1992 Summer Paralympics.

== Disability classifications ==
Every participant at the Paralympics has their disability grouped into one of five disability categories; amputation, the condition may be congenital or sustained through injury or illness; cerebral palsy; wheelchair athletes, there is often overlap between this and other categories; visual impairment, including blindness; Les autres, any physical disability that does not fall strictly under one of the other categories, for example dwarfism or multiple sclerosis. Each Paralympic sport then has its own classifications, dependent upon the specific physical demands of competition. Events are given a code, made of numbers and letters, describing the type of event and classification of the athletes competing. Some sports, such as athletics, divide athletes by both the category and severity of their disabilities, other sports, for example swimming, group competitors from different categories together, the only separation being based on the severity of the disability.

== Competitors ==
Sport	Men	Women	Total
Athletics	1	1	2
Total	1	1	2

== Athletics ==
Men's Field

Athlete	Events	Result	Rank
Ignas Madumla Mtweve	Shot Put F56	22.88	8 SB

== See also ==
- Tanzania at the 2016 Summer Olympics
