= Tanzania at the 2024 Summer Paralympics =

- IPC code: TAN
- NPC: Tanzania Paralympic Committee

in Paris, France August 28, 2024 – September 8, 2024
- Competitors: 1 in 1 sport
- Flag bearer: Hilmy Shawwal
- Medals: Gold 0 Silver 0 Bronze 0 Total 0

Summer Paralympics appearances (overview)
- 1992; 1996–2000; 2004; 2008; 2012; 2016; 2020; 2024

Tanzania competed at the 2024 Summer Paralympics in Paris, France, from 28 August to 8 September 2024. This was the nation's seventh time competing at the Summer Paralympic Games after it made its debut at the 1992 Summer Paralympics. The delegation consisted of only one competitor from one sport.

== Competitors ==
The following is the list of number of competitors in the Games.

Sport	Men	Women	Total
Athletics	1	0	1
Total	1	0	1

== Athletics ==
Athlete	Event	Heat		Final	
Athlete	Event	Result	Rank	Result	Rank
Hilmy Shawwal	Men's 100 metres T54	16.08	6	Did not advance	

== See also ==
- Tanzania at the 2024 Summer Olympics
- Tanzania at the Paralympics
