= Cambodia at the 2016 Summer Paralympics =

- IPC code: CAM
- NPC: National Centre of Disabled Persons Cambodia

in Rio de Janeiro
- Competitors: 1 in 1 sports
- Flag bearer: Vun Van
- Medals: Gold 0 Silver 0 Bronze 0 Total 0

Summer Paralympics appearances (overview)
- 2000; 2004; 2008; 2012; 2016; 2020; 2024

Cambodia competed at the 2016 Summer Paralympics in Rio de Janeiro, Brazil, from 7 September to 18 September 2016. This was the nation's fifth time competing at the Summer Paralympic Games after it made its debut at the 2000 Summer Paralympics. The delegation consisted of Vun Van competing in the Men's 100 metres T54.

== Athletes ==
Sport	Men	Women	Total
Athletics	1	0	1
Total	1	0	1

== Athletics ==
Vun Van was the country's athletics competitor in Rio, competing in the Men's 100m - T54 event.

Men's Track

Athlete	Events	Heat		Final	
Athlete	Events	Time	Rank	Time	Rank
Vun Van	100 m T54	15.44	6	did not advance	

== See also ==
- Cambodia at the 2016 Summer Olympics
