= Andorra at the 2012 Summer Paralympics =

- IPC code: AND
- NPC: Federació Andorrana d'esports adaptats

in London
- Competitors: 1 in 1 sport
- Flag bearer: Jordi Casellas Albioc
- Medals: Gold 0 Silver 0 Bronze 0 Total 0

Summer Paralympics appearances (overview)
- 2012; 2016–2024

Andorra competed at the 2012 Summer Paralympics in London, United Kingdom from August 29 to September 9, 2012. Andorra was represented by one athlete, swimmer Antonio Sanchez Francisco, who did make it to the finals.

== Swimming ==
Athlete	Event	Heat		Final	
Athlete	Event	Time	Rank	Time	Rank
Antonio Sanchez Francisco	50m freestyle S7	1:00.84	14	did not advance	
Antonio Sanchez Francisco	100m breaststroke SB7	DSQ		did not advance	

== See also ==
- Andorra at the 2012 Summer Olympics
