= Cambodia at the 2024 Summer Paralympics =

- Flag of Cambodia
- IPC code: CAM
- NPC: National Centre of Disabled Persons Cambodia
- Website: www.paralympic.org.au

in Paris, France August 28, 2024 – September 8, 2024
- Competitors: 1 in 1 sport
- Flag bearer: Vun Van
- Medals: Gold 0 Silver 0 Bronze 0 Total 0

Summer Paralympics appearances (overview)
- 2000; 2004; 2008; 2012; 2016; 2020; 2024

Cambodia competed at the 2024 Summer Paralympics in Paris, France, from 28 August to 8 September 2024. This was the nation's seventh time competing at the Summer Paralympic Games after it made its debut at the 2000 Summer Paralympics. The delegation consisted of Vun Van competing in the Men's 100 metres T54.

== Competitors ==
The following is the list of number of competitors in the Games.

Sport	Men	Women	Total
Athletics	1	0	1
Total	1	0	1

== Athletics ==
Athlete	Event	Heats		Final	
Athlete	Event	Result	Rank	Result	Rank
Vun Van	Men's 100 metres T54	14.58	5	Did not advance	

== See also ==
- Cambodia at the 2024 Summer Olympics
- Cambodia at the Paralympics
