= The Gambia at the 2012 Summer Paralympics =

- IPC code: GAM
- NPC: Gambia National Paralympic Committee

in London
- Competitors: 2 in 1 sport
- Medals: Gold 0 Silver 0 Bronze 0 Total 0

Summer Paralympics appearances (overview)
- 2012; 2016; 2020; 2024

The Gambia made its Paralympic Games début at the 2012 Summer Paralympics in London, United Kingdom, from August 29 to September 9.

The Gambia National Paralympic Committee selected two athletes. Isatou Nyang (female) and Demba Jarju (male) both competed in track and field events, training for the 100, 200, and 800 metres races. Both are wheelchair athletes, and competed in wheelchairs donated by the Swiss Paralympic Committee. Jarju qualified for the Games by meeting the qualification targets, while Nyang received a wild card invitation to take part.

== Athletics ==
Athlete	Event	Heat		Final	
Athlete	Event	Result	Rank	Result	Rank
Demba Jarju	Men's 100m T54	18.84	7	Did not advance	
Demba Jarju	Men's 800m T54	2:27.88	8	Did not advance	
Isatou Nyang	Men's 100m T54	20.32	6	Did not advance	
Isatou Nyang	Men's 800m T54	DSQ		Did not advance	

== See also ==
- The Gambia at the Paralympics
- The Gambia at the 2012 Summer Olympics
