= Djibouti at the 2012 Summer Paralympics =

- IPC code: DJI

in London
- Competitors: 1 in 1 sport
- Medals: Gold 0 Silver 0 Bronze 0 Total 0

Summer Paralympics appearances (overview)
- 2012; 2016–2024

Djibouti made its Paralympic Games début at the 2012 Summer Paralympics in London, United Kingdom, from August 29 to September 9. The country was represented by a single athlete in middle distance running, their first Paralympian. Houssein Omar Hassan did poorly in his heat due to an ankle injury, and did not win a medal. Despite not winning a medal, he was cheered on by the crowd as he ran alone on the track for two laps.

== Background ==
Djibouti débuted in the Paralympics during these 2012 Games. The event was held from August 29 to September 9. The country had one athlete compete, in the men's 1500 meters T46.

== Athletics ==
Houssein Omar Hassan, a right arm amputee, competed in the men's 1,500 metres T46 (a category for athletes with disabilities affecting the upper limbs or torso). Since he was the only Djiboutian athlete, he was the flagbearer during the opening ceremonies.

Hassan suffered an ankle injury early in the race, but was determined to finish. He was cheered home by the London crowd as he finished seven minutes behind every other athlete; he ran more than two laps alone on the track after every other athlete had crossed the finish line. Hassan finished with a season best time of 11:23.50. Hassan said, "I thought of stopping, but I kept going because I wanted to finish."

Athlete	Event	Heat		Final	
Athlete	Event	Result	Rank	Result	Rank
Houssein Omar Hassan	Men's 1500m T46	11:23.50	8	Did not advance	

== See also ==
- Djibouti at the Paralympics
- Djibouti at the 2012 Summer Olympics
