= Tanzania at the 2008 Summer Paralympics =

- IPC code: TAN
- NPC: Tanzania Paralympic Committee external link

in Beijing
- Competitors: 1 in 1 sport
- Flag bearer: Ernest Nyabalale
- Medals: Gold 0 Silver 0 Bronze 0 Total 0

Summer Paralympics appearances (overview)
- 1992; 1996–2000; 2004; 2008; 2012; 2016; 2020; 2024

Tanzania competed in the 2008 Summer Paralympics in Beijing, China. The country's delegation consisted of a single athlete, Ernest Nyabalale. He trained in a Salvation Army facility in Tanzania under Kenyan Solomoni Maswai until a month before the games, on August 14, when he left for Nairobi to train with Kenyan athletes.

== Sports ==
=== Athletics ===
Athlete	Class	Event	Final		
Athlete	Class	Event	Result	Points	Rank
Ernest Nyabalale	F55-56	Men's shot put	6.88	593	17

== See also ==
- Tanzania at the Paralympics
- Tanzania at the 2008 Summer Olympics
