= Tanzania at the 2004 Summer Paralympics =

- IPC code: TAN
- NPC: Tanzania Paralympic Committee external link

in Athens
- Competitors: 2 in 1 sport
- Flag bearer: Mwanaidi Ng Itu
- Medals: Gold 0 Silver 0 Bronze 0 Total 0

Summer Paralympics appearances (overview)
- 1992; 1996–2000; 2004; 2008; 2012; 2016; 2020; 2024

Tanzania competed at the 2004 Summer Paralympics in Athens, Greece. The team included two athletes, one man and one woman, neither of whom won a medal.

== Sports ==
=== Athletics ===
==== Men's track ====
Athlete	Class	Event	Heats		Semifinal		Final	
Athlete	Class	Event	Result	Rank	Result	Rank	Result	Rank
Willbert Constantino	T46	800m	2:09.41	10	did not advance			

==== Women's track ====
Athlete	Class	Event	Heats		Semifinal		Final	
Athlete	Class	Event	Result	Rank	Result	Rank	Result	Rank
Mwanaidi Ng Itu	T46	100m	15.72	14	did not advance			
Mwanaidi Ng Itu	T46	200m	32.34	13	did not advance			

== See also ==
- Tanzania at the Paralympics
- Tanzania at the 2004 Summer Olympics
