= Cambodia at the 2020 Summer Paralympics =

- IPC code: CAM
- NPC: National Centre of Disabled Persons Cambodia

in Tokyo
- Competitors: 1 in 1 sports
- Flag bearer: Vun Van
- Medals: Gold 0 Silver 0 Bronze 0 Total 0

Summer Paralympics appearances (overview)
- 2000; 2004; 2008; 2012; 2016; 2020; 2024

Cambodia competed at the 2020 Summer Paralympics in Tokyo, Japan, from 24 August to 5 September 2021. This was the nation's sixth time competing at the Summer Paralympic Games after it made its debut at the 2000 Summer Paralympics. The delegation consisted of Vun Van competing in the Men's 100 metres T54.

== Competitors ==
The following is the list of number of competitors in the Games.

Sport	Men	Women	Total
Athletics	1	0	1
Total	1	0	1

== Athletics ==
Track events

Athlete	Event	Heats		Final	
Athlete	Event	Result	Rank	Result	Rank
Vun Van	100m T54	14.39	2 Q	14.21	7

== See also ==
- Cambodia at the 2020 Summer Olympics
