= Gabon at the 2020 Summer Paralympics =

- Flag of Gabon
- IPC code: GAB

in Tokyo, Japan August 24, 2021 – September 5, 2021
- Competitors: 2 (1 man and 1 woman) in 1 sport
- Medals: Gold 0 Silver 0 Bronze 0 Total 0

Summer Paralympics appearances (overview)
- 2008; 2012; 2016; 2020; 2024

Gabon competed at the 2020 Summer Paralympics in Tokyo, Japan, from 24 August to 5 September 2021. This was their fourth consecutive appearance at the Summer Paralympics since 2008.

== Competitors ==
The following is the list of number of competitors participating in the Games:

Sport	Men	Women	Total
Athletics	1	1	2
Total	1	1	2

== Athletics ==
Men's track

Athlete	Event	Heats		Final	
Athlete	Event	Result	Rank	Result	Rank
Davy Rendhel Moukagni Moukagni	100 m T47	12.12	8	Did not advance	

Women's field

Athlete	Event	Final	
Athlete	Event	Result	Rank
Audrey Fabiola Mengue Pambo	Shot put F57		

== See also ==
- Gabon at the Paralympics
- Gabon at the 2020 Summer Olympics
