= Cambodia at the 2008 Summer Paralympics =

- IPC code: CAM
- NPC: National Centre of Disabled Persons Cambodia

in Beijing
- Competitors: 1 in 1 sport
- Flag bearer: Vanna Kim
- Medals: Gold 0 Silver 0 Bronze 0 Total 0

Summer Paralympics appearances (overview)
- 2000; 2004; 2008; 2012; 2016; 2020; 2024

Cambodia competed at the 2008 Summer Paralympics in Beijing.

== Athletics ==
Athlete	Class	Event	Heats		Final	
Athlete	Class	Event	Result	Rank	Result	Rank
Vanna Kim	T44	Men's 100m	13.45	12	did not advance	
Vanna Kim	T44	Men's 200m	28.32	10	did not advance	

== See also ==
- Cambodia at the Paralympics
- Cambodia at the 2008 Summer Olympics
