= Thin Seng Hon =

Cambodian athlete (born 1986)

Personal information
- National team: Cambodia
- Born: April 25, 1986 (age 40) Kampong Cham Province, Cambodia

Sport
- Country: Cambodia
- Sport: Track and field
- Coached by: Phay Sok
Medal record
Women's athletics
Representing Cambodia
ASEAN Para Games
Silver medal – second place	2015 Singapore	200 m T43/44
- Updated on 21 November 2017

Thin Seng Hon (born 25 April 1986) is a Cambodian athlete, who was the only member of her nation's 2012 Summer Paralympics team. She won a silver medal in the T43/44 200 metres at the 2015 ASEAN Para Games.

== Career ==
Thin Seng Hon was born on 25 April 1986. She was born with a right leg defect, with it ending below the knee, and deformities to some of her fingers. To attend school in Kampong Cham Province, Cambodia, Hon needed to walk 4 kilometres (2.5 mi) on crutches. She stood out in her village as she was the only person with a disability, and was bullied at school because she was different. She was bought her first prosthetic at the age of eight.

She began learning English at 18, and afterwards moved to Phnom Penh away from her village and family. She took up sports in 2005 after seeing an advert asking for disabled athletes. She was the fastest in the 100 metres, and was drafted into the national team. After taking part without proper equipment at the 2005 ASEAN Para Games, she gave up the sport. Her friends purchased her a running blade, which meant she started running again, competing at the 2010 Asian Para Games.

Hon was the only member of Cambodian team for the 2012 Summer Paralympics, leading to criticism in the media as Cambodia has one of the highest proportions of disabled people worldwide at 8.9%. In previous years, the International Paralympic Committee had granted two wildcard places at the Paralympics to Cambodia, but for 2012 this was reduced to a place for a single woman. Hon's trainer, Phay Sok was frustrated at the level of equipment available to other nations.

At the 2015 ASEAN Para Games in Singapore, Hon took part in both the T43/44 100 metres and the 200 metres. Although she took the lead initially in the 200 metres, she finished in fourth position. In the 100 metres, she took second place and the silver medal. She was running on blades designed for long-distance running rather than sprinting.

== Personal life ==
In 2011, Hon moved to Melbourne, Australia, where she has permanent residency. She works at an orchid nursery.
