= Gabon at the 2024 Summer Paralympics =

- IPC code: GAB

in Paris, France August 28, 2024 – September 8, 2024
- Competitors: 2 (1 man and 1 woman) in 1 sport
- Flag bearers: Audrey Fabiola Mengue Pambo; Davy Rendhel Moukagni Moukagni
- Medals: Gold 0 Silver 0 Bronze 0 Total 0

Summer Paralympics appearances (overview)
- 2008; 2012; 2016; 2020; 2024

Gabon competed at the 2024 Summer Paralympics in Paris, France, from 28 August to 8 September 2024. This was the nation's fifth time competing at the Summer Paralympic Games after it made its debut at the 2008 Summer Paralympics. The delegation consisted of two competitors from one sport.

== Competitors ==
The following is the list of number of competitors in the Games.

Sport	Men	Women	Total
Athletics	1	1	2
Total	1	1	2

== Athletics ==
Athlete	Event	Heat		Final	
Athlete	Event	Result	Rank	Result	Rank
Davy Rendhel Moukagni Moukagni	Men's 100 metres T47	12.90	8	Did not advance	
Audrey Fabiola Mengue Pambo	Women's discus throw F57	12.37	6	Did not advance	

== See also ==
- Gabon at the 2024 Summer Olympics
- Gabon at the Paralympics
