= Tanzania at the 2012 Summer Paralympics =

- IPC code: TAN
- NPC: Tanzania Paralympic Committee external link

in London
- Competitors: 1 in 1 sport
- Medals: Gold 0 Silver 0 Bronze 0 Total 0

Summer Paralympics appearances (overview)
- 1992; 1996–2000; 2004; 2008; 2012; 2016; 2020; 2024

Tanzania competed at the 2012 Summer Paralympics in London, United Kingdom from August 29 to September 9, 2012.

== Athletics ==
Men's field

Athlete	Event	Distance	Points	Rank
Zaharani Mwenemti	Shot put F57-58	9.52 m	403	16
Zaharani Mwenemti	Discus throw F57-58	39.41 m	605	15

== See also ==
- Tanzania at the Paralympics
- Tanzania at the 2012 Summer Olympics
