= Cambodia at the 2004 Summer Paralympics =

- IPC code: CAM
- NPC: National Centre of Disabled Persons Cambodia

in Athens
- Competitors: 2 in 1 sport
- Flag bearer: Botum Pov
- Medals: Gold 0 Silver 0 Bronze 0 Total 0

Summer Paralympics appearances (overview)
- 2000; 2004; 2008; 2012; 2016; 2020; 2024

Cambodia competed at the 2004 Summer Paralympics in Athens, Greece. The team included two athletes, one man and one woman, neither of whom won a medal.

== Sports ==
=== Athletics ===
==== Men's track ====
Athlete	Class	Event	Heats		Semifinal		Final	
Athlete	Class	Event	Result	Rank	Result	Rank	Result	Rank
Kimhor Nhork	T44	100m	12.93	11	did not advance			
Kimhor Nhork	T44	200m	26.55	12	did not advance			

==== Women's track ====
Athlete	Class	Event	Heats		Semifinal		Final	
Athlete	Class	Event	Result	Rank	Result	Rank	Result	Rank
Botum Pov	T46	400m	1:29.37	9	did not advance			

== See also ==
- Cambodia at the Paralympics
- Cambodia at the 2004 Summer Olympics
