= Athletics at the 2024 Summer Paralympics – Men's 100 metres T54 =

Men's 100 metres T54 at the XVII Paralympic Games
- Venue: Stade de France, Paris, France
- Dates: 4 September 2024
- Competitors: 14 from 12 nations
- Winning time: 13.74

Medalists
1st place, gold medalist(s)		Juan Pablo Cervantes Garcia	Mexico
2nd place, silver medalist(s)		Athiwat Paeng-Nuea	Thailand
3rd place, bronze medalist(s)		Leo-Pekka Tähti	Finland

100 metres at the 2024 Summer Paralympics
Men · T11 · T12 · T13 · T34 · T35 · T36 · T37 · T38 · T44 · T47 · T51 · T52 · T53 · T54 · T63 · T64
Women · T11 · T12 · T13 · T34 · T35 · T36 · T37 · T38 · T47 · T53 · T54 · T63 · T64

The Men's 100 metres T54 at the 2024 Summer Paralympics took place on 4 September at the Stade de France in Paris.

== Records ==
Prior to the competition, the existing records were as follows:

World Record	Athiwat Paeng-Nuea (THA)	13.63	(Germany) Hechingen	9 May 2024
Paralympic Record	Leo-Pekka Tähti (FIN)	13.63	(United Kingdom) London	1 September 2012

Area	Time		Athlete	Location	Date
Africa	14.22		(Ghana) Nkegbe Botsyo	(United States) Tempe	24 May 2019
America	13.80		(Mexico) Juan Pablo Cervantes García	(Chile) Santiago	24 November 2023
Asia	13.63	WR	(Thailand) Athiwat Paeng-Nuea	(France) Paris	15 July 2023
Europe	13.63	PR	(Finland) Leo-Pekka Tähti	(United Kingdom) London	1 September 2012
Oceania	13.94		(Australia) Sam Carter	(United Arab Emirates) Dubai	7 November 2019

== Classification ==
The T54 classification is for wheelchair athletes with strong arm and torso movement, who have an impairment in their legs. Athletes have fast acceleration, can maintain top speed and maintain their pushing speed while steering.

== Results ==
=== Round 1 ===
The Heats took place on 4 September, starting at 11:22 (UTC+2) in the morning session. First 3 in each heat (Q) and the next 2 fastest (q) advance to the final

=== Heat 1 ===
Rank	Lane	Athlete	Nation	Time	Notes
1	8	Athiwat Paeng-Nuea	Thailand	13.71	Q
2	2	Juan Pablo Cervantes Garcia	Mexico	13.84	Q, SB
3	4	Hu Yang	China	14.24	Q
4	5	Luke Bailey	Australia	14.39	q
5	3	Vun Van	Cambodia	14.58	SB
6	7	Smbat Karapetyan	Armenia	16.98	
7	6	Malang Tamba	The Gambia	18.13	SB
Source:				Wind: 0.0 m/s	

=== Heat 2 ===
Rank	Lane	Athlete	Nation	Time	Notes
1	7	Mamudo Balde	Portugal	13.75	Q PB
2	4	Leo-Pekka Tähti	Finland	13.84	Q
3	8	Zhang Ying	China	14.10	Q, SB
4	6	Phiphatphong Sianglam	Thailand	14.52	q, SB
5	5	Tomoki Ikoma	Japan	14.73	
6	2	Hilmy Shawwal	Tanzania	16.08	
7	3	Kesete Sibhatu Weldemariam	Eritrea	19.18	PB
Source:				Wind: +1.4 m/s	

=== Final ===
The final took place on 4 September, starting at 19:24 (UTC+2) in the evening.

Rank	Lane	Athlete	Nation	Time	Notes
1st place, gold medalist(s)	7	Juan Pablo Cervantes Garcia	Mexico	13.74	AR
2nd place, silver medalist(s)	4	Athiwat Paeng-Nuea	Thailand	13.79	
3rd place, bronze medalist(s)	6	Leo-Pekka Tähti	Finland	13.86	
4	8	Hu Yang	China	14.14	
5	5	Mamudo Balde	Portugal	14.19	
6	3	Zhang Ying	China	14.28	
7	9	Luke Bailey	Australia	14.39	
8	2	Phiphatphong Sianglam	Thailand	14.84	
Source:				Wind: -0.2 m/s	
