= Cambodia at the 2012 Summer Paralympics =

- IPC code: CAM
- NPC: National Centre of Disabled Persons Cambodia

in London
- Competitors: 1 in 1 sport
- Flag bearer: Thin Senghon
- Medals: Gold 0 Silver 0 Bronze 0 Total 0

Summer Paralympics appearances (overview)
- 2000; 2004; 2008; 2012; 2016; 2020; 2024

Cambodia competed at the 2012 Summer Paralympics in London, United Kingdom, from August 29 to September 9.

The country is fielding its smallest delegation to date: a single athlete, female sprinter Thin Seng Hon. As no Cambodian athlete qualified for the Games, the country received a wildcard invitation to send one competitor in track and field events.

Thin "was born without a fully formed right leg", and uses a "$2 500 J-shaped running blade" prosthetic. Her coach, pointing out that her prosthetic is "not custom-built for sprinting and is less comfortable and shock absorbent than those owned by her first world rivals", has argued she is likely to be disadvantaged by a "technology gap", as well as by poverty; Thin "trains on a dirt track and balances running with a full-time job at a souvenir shop".

== Athletics ==
Thin Seng Hon competed in the women's 100m and women's 200m T44 (a category for lower limb amputees running with a prosthetic).

Athlete	Events	Heat		Final	
Athlete	Events	Time	Rank	Time	Rank
Thin Seng Hon	Women's 100m T44	17.35	6	did not advance	
Thin Seng Hon	Women's 200m T44	DSQ		did not advance	

== See also ==
- Summer Paralympic disability classification
- Cambodia at the Paralympics
- Cambodia at the 2012 Summer Olympics
