= Sam Carter (athlete) =

Australian Paralympic athlete

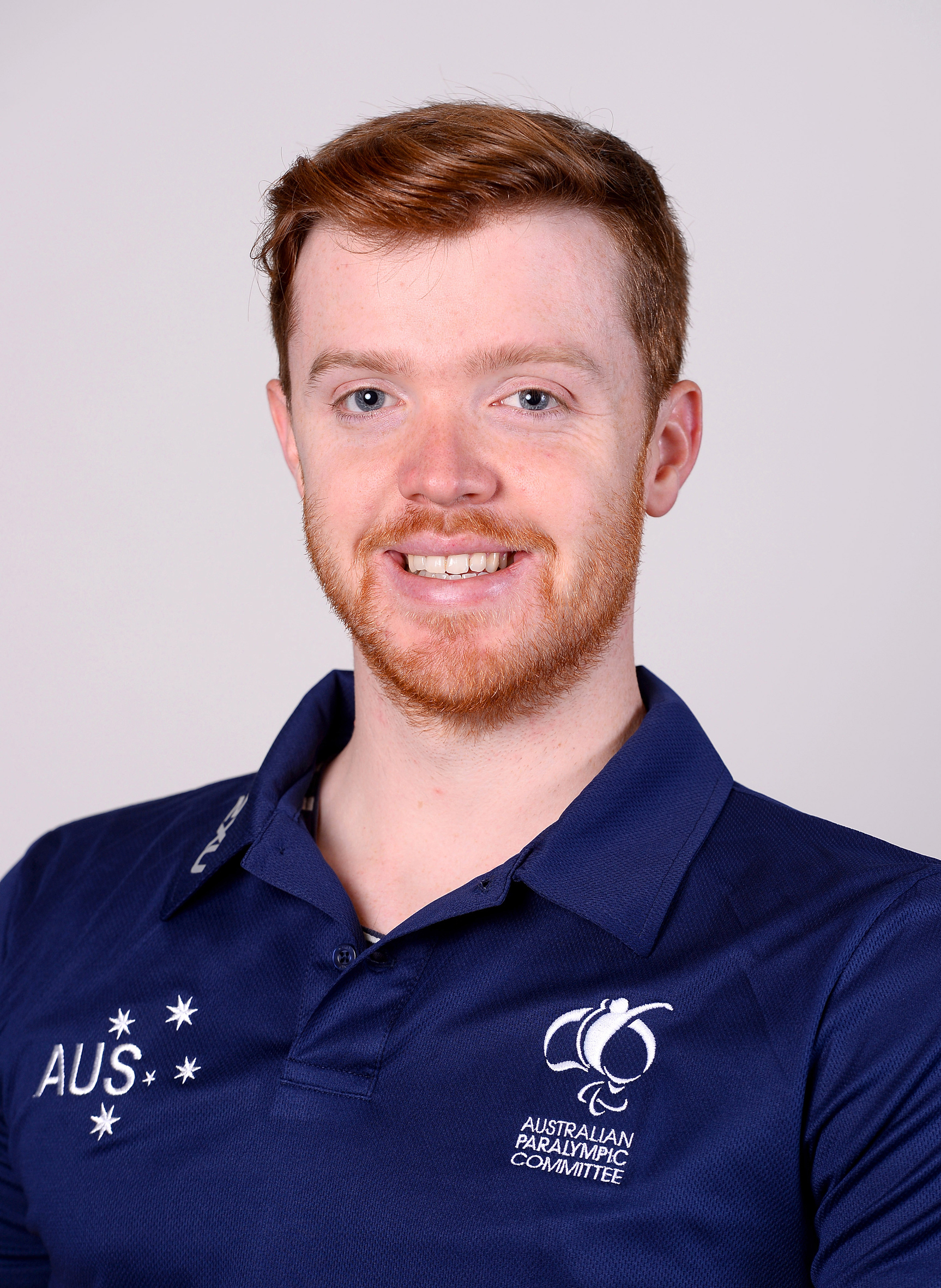
- 2016 Australian Paralympic team portrait

Personal information
- Nationality: Australia
- Born: 6 August 1991 (age 34) Toowoomba, Queensland
- Other interests: ACT Greens candidate

Sport
- Disability: Spina bifida
- Disability class: T54
Medal record
Representing Australia
Men's Athletics
Commonwealth Games
Bronze medal – third place	2022 Birmingham	Men's 1500 T54
IPC Grand Prix -
Gold medal – first place	2015 Brisbane	Men's 100m Wheelchair
Silver medal – second place	2015 Brisbane	Men's 400m Wheelchair

Samuel Harrison Carter (born 6 August 1991) is an Australian Paralympic athlete, who competes in 100m, 200m, 400m and 1500m T54 events. He has represented Australia at the 2016 Rio Paralympics and 2020 Tokyo Paralympics, as well as at the 2022 Birmingham Commonwealth Games.

== Early life ==
Carter was born on 6 August 1991 in Toowoomba, Queensland with spina bifida. He attended Harristown State High School in Queensland.

Before becoming a wheelchair racer, he was actively engaged in sport, in particular swimming and wheelchair basketball.

In 2001, Carter attended a sports day held by Queensland Sporting Wheelies aimed at increasing the participation of disabled kids in sport, where he met Paralympian Geoff Trappett, who had won gold in the Men's T54 100m at the 2000 Sydney Paralympic Games and encouraged Carter to become involved in wheelchair racing.

== Sporting career ==
Carter began competing in 2003 as a junior athlete. Throughout his career, Carter has trained under a number of coaches including Geoff Darragh, Glen Baker, Brett Jones, Paul Angel, and currently trains under Fred Periac at the Australian Institute of Sport in Canberra.

In 2008, he broke national age records for the 100m, 200m and 400m in wheelchair racing. He went on to become the 100m junior world champion, winning gold in the 100m at the 2009 Junior Athletics World Championships.

In 2011, Carter made the transition into adult competitions, where he has competed against wheelchair racers such as David Weir and Marcel Hug. Carter represented Australia at the 2011 IPC Athletics World Championships in Christchurch in the T54 100m, 200m and 400m. He also competed in the 2011 Gold Coast Wheelchair Half Marathon, which he won. In 2013 Carter was selected to represent Australia, in the T54 100m, 200m and 400m at the 2013 IPC Athletics World Championships in Lyon.] He placed 6th and 5th in the T54 100m and 200m respectively. He won gold and silver at the 2015 Brisbane IPC Grand Prix in the T54 100m and 400m respectively.

At the 2015 IPC Athletics World Championships in Doha, Carter finished sixth in the Men's 100m T54, fifth in the Men's 200m and sixteenth in the Men's 400m T54.

At the 2016 Rio Paralympics, Carter finished sixth in the Men's 100m T54 and was ranked 15th in the Men's 400m T54.

At the 2019 World Para Athletics Championships in London, Carter finished fourth both the Men's 100m T54 and Men's 400m T54.

At the 2020 Tokyo Paralympics, Carter finished seventh in the heat and therefore qualified for the final. He came fifth in the Men's 100m T54 final and failed to win a medal. In the Men's 400m T54 Carter came ninth and did not advance to the final.

At the 2022 Commonwealth Games, Birmingham, he won the bronze medal in the Men's 1500m T54.

At the 2023 World Para Athletics Championships in Paris, he finished fourth in the Men's 100m T54 and fifth in the heat of the Men's 400m T54.

== Political career ==
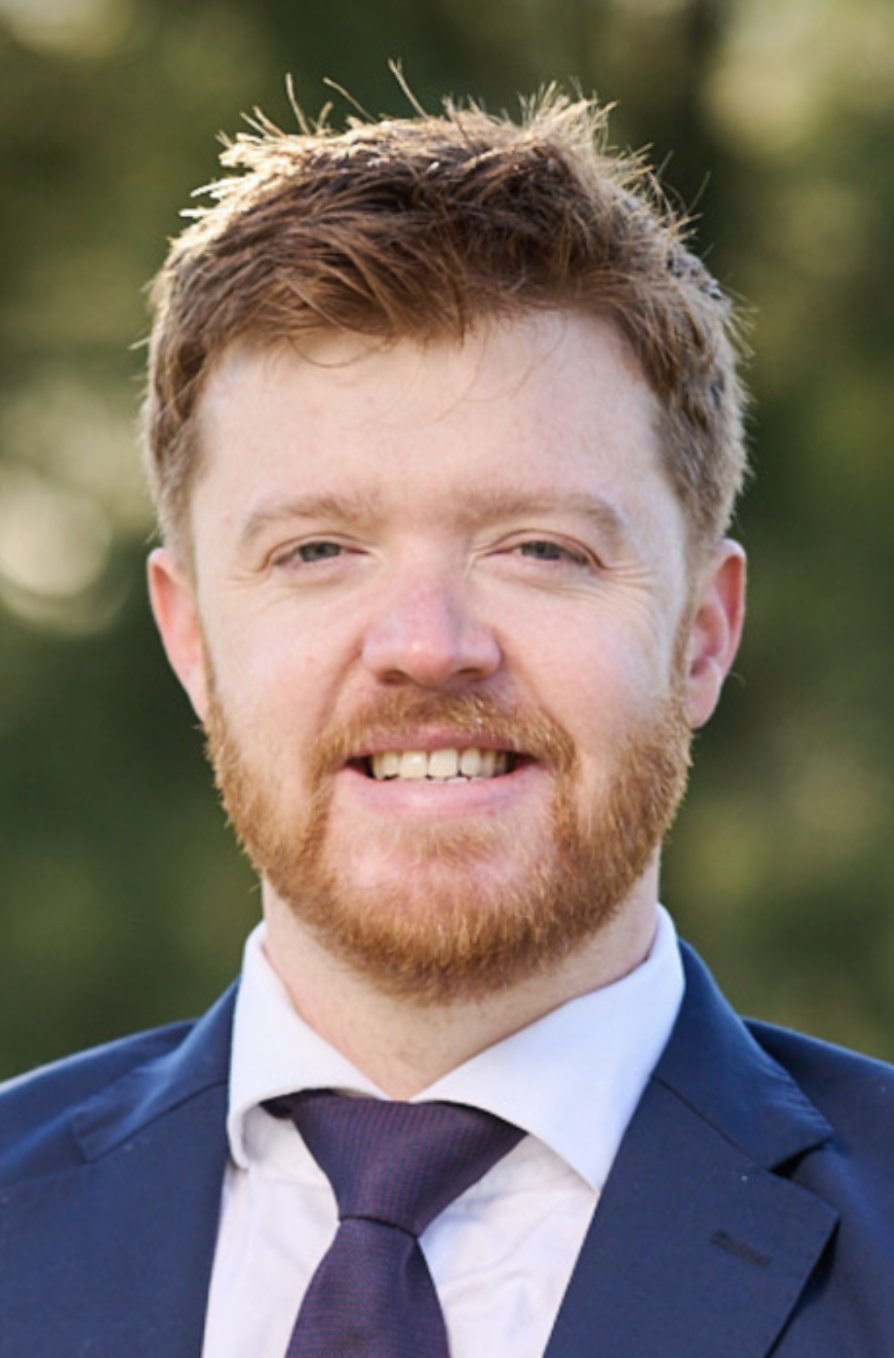
Carter as a Greens candidate in 2025

In the 2024 Australian Capital Territory election, Carter ran as a Greens candidate to represent the Murrumbidgee electorate, but was unsuccessful.

He ran as the Greens candidate for the Division of Bean in south Canberra in the 2025 Australian federal election, achieving 9.5% of the vote.

== Personal life ==
Carter has been an ethical vegan since 2017. He moved to Canberra in 2017 to make use of the training facilities at the Australian Institute of Sport.

== Recognition ==
In 2009, Carter won the Sports Darling Downs senior rookie of the year.
