= Athletics at the 2020 Summer Paralympics – Men's 100 metres T54 =

Men's 100 metres T54 at the XVI Paralympic Games
- Venue: Tokyo National Stadium
- Dates: 1 September 2021 (final)
- Competitors: 18 from 13 nations
- Winning time: 13.76

Medalists
1st place, gold medalist(s)		Athiwat Paeng-nuea	Thailand
2nd place, silver medalist(s)		Leo-Pekka Tähti	Finland
3rd place, bronze medalist(s)		Juan Pablo Cervantes García	Mexico

Men's 100 metres
T11 · T12 · T13 · T33 · T34 · T35 · T36 · T37 · T38 · T47 · T51 · T52 · T53 · T54 · T63 · T64

The men's 100 metres T54 event at the 2020 Summer Paralympics in Tokyo, took place on 1 September 2021.

The T54 category is for wheelchair athletes with no leg function, but near full arm function and reasonable to normal trunk function. Typically this may be caused by a lower spinal cord injury or spinal cord birth defect.

== Records ==
Prior to the competition, the existing records were as follows:

World Record	Leo-Pekka Tähti (FIN)	13.63	London, United Kingdom	1 September 2012
Paralympic Record	Leo-Pekka Tähti (FIN)	13.63	London, United Kingdom	1 September 2012

Area	Time	Athlete	Nation
Africa	14.22	Raphael Botsyo Nkegbe	Ghana
America	13.99	Juan Pablo Cervantes Garcia	Mexico
Asia	13.77	Liu Yang	China
Europe	13.63 WR	Leo-Pekka Tähti	Finland
Oceania	13.94	Sam Carter	Australia

== Results ==
=== Heats ===
Heat 1 took place on 1 September 2021, at 11:43:

Rank	Lane	Name	Nationality	Time	Notes
1	7	Athiwat Paeng-nuea	Thailand	14.00	Q
2	5	Vun van	Cambodia	14.39	Q, PB
3	6	Liu Yang	China	14.47	SB
4	4	Jaenal Aripin	Indonesia	14.53	SB
5	3	Luke Bailey	Australia	14.55	
6	8	Esa-Pekka Mattila	Finland	14.71	

Heat 2 took place on 1 September 2021, at 11:50:

Rank	Lane	Name	Nationality	Time	Notes
1	5	Juan Pablo Cervantes García	Mexico	13.85	Q, AR
2	7	Hu Yang	China	13.96	Q, PB
3	8	Sam Carter	Australia	14.19	q, SB
4	6	Erik Hightower	United States	14.33	
5	4	Saichon Konjen	Thailand	14.39	SB
6	3	Tomoki Ikoma	Japan	14.50	

Heat 3 took place on 1 September 2021, at 11:57:

Rank	Lane	Name	Nationality	Time	Notes
1	3	Leo-Pekka Tähti	Finland	13.81	Q
2	7	Zhang Ying	China	13.95	Q, PB
3	4	Kenny van Weeghel	Netherlands	14.17	q, SB
4	6	Gabriel Emmanuel Sosa	Argentina	15.08	
5	8	Malang Tamba	The Gambia	18.26	
6	5	Stas Nazaryan	Armenia	18.76	PB

=== Final ===
The final took place on 1 September 2021, at 19:30:

Rank	Lane	Name	Nationality	Time	Notes
1st place, gold medalist(s)	4	Athiwat Paeng-nuea	Thailand	13.76	AR
2nd place, silver medalist(s)	5	Leo-Pekka Tähti	Finland	13.85	
3rd place, bronze medalist(s)	7	Juan Pablo Cervantes García	Mexico	13.87	
4	6	Zhang Ying	China	14.04	
5	2	Sam Carter	Australia	14.08	SB
6	9	Hu Yang	China	14.09	
7	8	Vun van	Cambodia	14.21	PB
8	3	Kenny van Weeghel	Netherlands	14.53	
