= TVE HD =

- Country: Spain

Programming
- Picture format: 720p (HDTV)

Ownership
- Owner: Televisión Española
- Sister channels: La 1, La 2, Clan, 24h, Teledeporte

History
- Launched: 6 August 2008; 17 years ago 15 June 2009; 16 years ago (relaunch)
- Closed: 31 December 2013; 12 years ago

Links
- Website: www.rtve.es

Availability

Terrestrial
- Available in selected areas: -

TVE HD was a Spanish high-definition test television channel owned and operated by Televisión Española (TVE), the television division of state-owned public broadcaster Radiotelevisión Española (RTVE). It was available via pay television platforms Digital+ and Movistar TV, but not on DTT nor free-to-air as originally planned.

It was launched on 6 August 2008 broadcasting the 2008 Olympic Games in high-definition. The channel was available until its closure on 31 December 2013 when TVE launched the high-definition versions of La 1 and Teledeporte.
