= Athletics at the 2016 Summer Paralympics – Men's 100 metres T54 =

Men's 100 metres T54 at the XV Paralympic Games
- Venue: Estádio Olímpico João Havelange
- Dates: 16–17 September 2016
- Competitors: 21 from 17 nations

Medalists
1st place, gold medalist(s)		Leo-Pekka Tähti	Finland
2nd place, silver medalist(s)		Yang Liu	China
3rd place, bronze medalist(s)		Kenny van Weeghel	Netherlands

The T54 category is for wheelchair athletes with no leg function, but near full arm function and reasonable to normal trunk function. Typically this may be caused by a lower spinal cord injury or spinal cord birth defect.

The Athletics at the 2016 Summer Paralympics – Men's 100 metres T54 event at the 2016 Paralympic Games took place on 16–17 September 2016, at the Estádio Olímpico João Havelange.

== Heats ==
The heats were held consecutively on the evening of 16 September. 21 athletes were divided into three heats of seven athletes each. Qualification to the final was automatic for the top two athletes in each heat, and the fastest two losers also qualified for the final.

=== Heat 1 ===
19:27 16 September 2016:

Rank	Lane	Bib	Name	Nationality	Reaction	Time	Notes
1	9	2358	Erik Hightower	United States		14.56	Q
2	8	1736	Yoshifumi Nagao	Japan		14.76	Q
3	7	1502	Richard Chiassaro	Great Britain		14.83	
4	3	2298	Rashed Aldhaheri	United Arab Emirates		15.41	
5	5	2339	Eduardo Dutra	Uruguay		16.76	
6	6	1484	Edmond Ngombi	Gabon		18.79	
7	4	1490	Demba Jarju	The Gambia		18.82	

=== Heat 2 ===
19:34 16 September 2016:

Rank	Lane	Bib	Name	Nationality	Reaction	Time	Notes
1	6	1254	Yang Liu	China		14.11	Q
2	5	1930	Kenny van Weeghel	Netherlands		14.28	Q
3	9	2229	Saichon Konjen	Thailand		14.44	q
4	8	1045	Samuel Carter	Australia		14.59	q
5	7	1457	Esa-Pekka Mattila	Finland		15.07	
6	3	2372	Daniel Romanchuk	United States		15.61	
7	4	1185	Jacques Ouedraogo	Burkina Faso		19.32	

=== Heat 3 ===
19:41 16 September 2016:

Rank	Lane	Bib	Name	Nationality	Reaction	Time	Notes
1	6	1459	Leo-Pekka Tähti	Finland		14.00	Q
2	7	1240	Yanfeng Cui	China		14.39	Q
3	3	2282	Fethi Zouinkhi	Tunisia		14.70	
4	5	1549	Marc Schuh	Germany		15.26	
5	4	2228	Ekkachai Janthon	Thailand		15.29	
6	9	1197	Vun Van	Cambodia		15.44	
7	8	1296	Jhon Mwengani Mabonze	Democratic Republic of the Congo		17.46	

== Final ==
19:37 17 September 2016:

Rank	Lane	Bib	Name	Nationality	Reaction	Time	Notes
1st place, gold medalist(s)	3	1459	Leo-Pekka Tähti	Finland		13.90	
2nd place, silver medalist(s)	6	1254	Yang Liu	China		14.10	
3rd place, bronze medalist(s)	5	1930	Kenny van Weeghel	Netherlands		14.23	
4	2	2229	Saichon Konjen	Thailand		14.28	
5	8	1240	Yanfeng Cui	China		14.32	
6	1	1045	Samuel Carter	Australia		14.46	
7	4	2358	Erik Hightower	United States		14.49	
8	7	1736	Yoshifumi Nagao	Japan		14.71	
