= Thierry Mabicka =

Gabonese athlete

Thierry Mabicka (born 14 October 1973) is a wheelchair track and field athlete from Gabon.

He participated in the 2008 Summer Paralympics in Beijing and was the flag bearer of the Gabon team at the opening ceremony. He participated in the men's 800m T54 athletics, but he could not buy a wheelchair for competition because he was poor, and only one person participated in the competition with a wheelchair for basketball. However, he was disqualified because he was unable to match the wheelchair for competition and was separated greatly, but unlike the wheelchair for competition, it was difficult to turn gently, so he invaded another lane and was disqualified. While he was still on the course after disqualification, he collided with Zhang Ritsushin of China and Kenji Kotani of Japan in the second week.

A few days later, he took part in the javelin throw competition instead, but ended up with a record of 11.72m as other players put out the 30m range.

Mabicka also competed in the 2012 Summer Paralympics in 100 m T54 athletics and javelin.
