= Noorel Shariff =

Noorelain Shariff was a table tennis player for Tanzania at the 1992 Paralympic Games in Barcelona. Prior to this Tanzania had never participated in the Paralympic Games, and Shariff was the sole athlete to represent Tanzania during that year.
