= Vun Van =

Cambodian Paralympic athlete (born 1986)

Van Vun
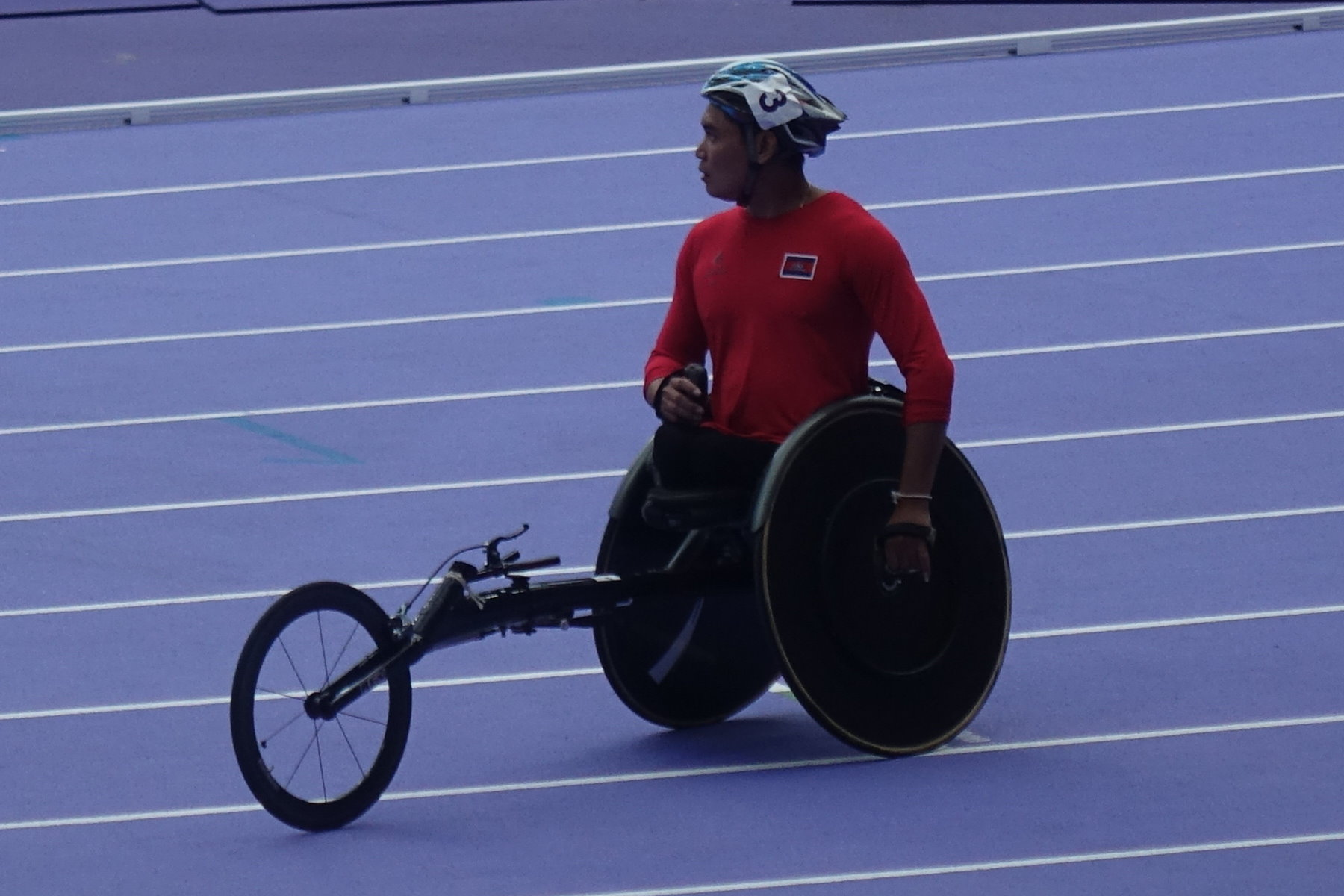
- Van at the 2024 Summer Paralympics

Personal information
- Nationality: Cambodian
- Born: 7 February 1986 (age 40)

Sport
- Sport: Para-athletics
- Disability class: T54
- Event: 100 metres
Medal record
Para-athletics
Representing Cambodia
Asian Para Games
Bronze medal – third place	2026 Aichi–Nagoya	T54 100 metres
ASEAN Para Games
Silver medal – second place	2011 Surakarta	T53 100 metres
Silver medal – second place	2011 Surakarta	T53 200 metres
Bronze medal – third place	2015 Singapore	T53 100 metres

Van Vun (born 7 February 1986) is a Cambodian para-athlete specializing in the 100 metres. He represented Cambodia at three Summer Paralympics in 2016, 2020 and 2024.

== Early life ==
Van became paralysed in both legs at age 3 after contracting Polio due to a lack of vaccination in rural Cambodia. Born into a farming family, they were unable to afford a wheelchair for him and he was forced to drop out of school in Year 5. He was often discriminated against because of his disability. He only began wheelchair racing in 2006 at 20 after being introduced to the sport by an Australian organisation. In 2010, he was invited to train in Australia and was gifted a racing chair after which he took up the sport seriously.

== Career ==
At this first international event, would win silver at the 2011 ASEAN Para Games in the 100 and 200 metres. He would continue his form, winning Gold in the 100, 200 and 400 metres at the 2013 Myanmar Games, being awarded $30,000 by the Cambodian Government for his achievements.

He won Bronze at 2015 ASEAN Para Games, before being selected as Cambodia's sole representative at the 2016, acting as the flag bearer and finishing 15th in the 100 m T54.

Van was again the sole representative and flag bearer at the 2020 and 2024 Summer Paralympics, making the final of the 100 m T54 and finishing 7th in 2020.
