= 2012 Summer Paralympics =

Multi-parasport event in London, England

XIV Paralympic Games
- Location: London, United Kingdom
- Motto: Inspire a Generation
- Nations: 164
- Athletes: 4,237
- Events: 503 in 20 sports
- Opening: 29 August 2012
- Closing: 9 September 2012
- Opened by: Queen Elizabeth II
- Closed by: IPC President Philip Craven
- Cauldron: Margaret Maughan
- Stadium: Olympic Stadium

The 2012 Summer Paralympics, branded as the London 2012 Paralympic Games, were an international multi-sport parasports event held from 29 August to 9 September 2012 in London, England, United Kingdom. They were the 14th Summer Paralympic Games as organised by the International Paralympic Committee (IPC).

These Games were the first Summer Paralympics to be hosted by London and the first to be hosted solely by Great Britain. The English village of Stoke Mandeville had previously co-hosted the 1984 Games with Long Island, New York, after the original host—the University of Illinois at Urbana–Champaign—withdrew due to financial difficulties. In 1948, the village hosted the Stoke Mandeville Games—the first organised sporting event for athletes with disabilities, and a precursor to the modern Paralympic Games—to coincide with the opening of the 1948 Olympics in London.

LOCOG expected London 2012 to be the first Paralympics to achieve mass-market appeal, fuelled by continued enthusiasm over Great Britain's performance during the Olympics, awareness of England's role in the history of the Paralympics, increasing media coverage and promotion of the Games (including attention surrounding South African sprinter Oscar Pistorius—who had recently the first double amputee to compete in sprinting at the Olympics, as well as a major advertising campaign by the Games' local rightsholder). The Games ultimately met these expectations, breaking records for ticket sales, heightening the profile of the Paralympics in relation to the Olympics, and prompting IPC president Philip Craven to declare them the "greatest Paralympic Games ever."

A total of 503 events in 20 sports were held during the Games; events for athletes with intellectual disabilities (ID) returned to the Paralympic programme after being suspended following the 2000 Summer Paralympics, The Games were contested by a record 4,243 athletes representing 164 National Paralympic Committees, with 14 countries making their Paralympic debut. For the third Summer Paralympics in a row, China won the most medals overall, with a total of 231 (95 of them being gold), followed by Russia and Great Britain.

== Bidding process ==
As part of a formal agreement between the International Paralympic Committee and the International Olympic Committee established in 2001, the winner of the bid for the 2012 Summer Olympics was also to host the 2012 Summer Paralympics. At the 117th IOC Session in Singapore, the rights to host the 2012 Summer Olympics and Paralympics were awarded to London.

2012 Summer Olympics bidding results
City	NOC/NPC	Round 1	Round 2	Round 3	Round 4
London	Great Britain	22	27	39	54
Paris	France	21	25	33	50
Madrid	Spain	20	32	31	—
New York City	United States	19	16	—	—
Moscow	Russia	15	—	—	—

== Development and preparation ==
As with the Olympics, the 2012 Summer Paralympics were overseen by the London Organising Committee of the Olympic and Paralympic Games (LOCOG) and the Olympic Delivery Authority (ODA). LOCOG was responsible for overseeing the staging of the games, while the ODA dealt with infrastructure and venues.

The Government Olympic Executive (GOE) within the Department for Culture, Media and Sport (DCMS) was the lead Government body for co-ordinating the London 2012 Olympics and Paralympics. The GOE reported through the DCMS Permanent Secretary to the Minister for Sports and the Olympics Hugh Robertson. It focused on oversight of the Games, cross-programme management and the London 2012 Olympic Legacy.

England's role in the history of the Paralympics was emphasised as part of the Games: an event known as the Stoke Mandeville Games were hosted by the village of Stoke Mandeville—site of the National Spinal Injuries Centre—to coincide with the opening of the 1948 Summer Olympics in London. Contested between British veterans of the Second World War, it was the first organised sporting event for athletes with disabilities, and served as a precursor to the modern Paralympic Games.

=== Venues and infrastructure ===
Facilities of the 2012 Summer Paralympics in the Greater London area. Navigate the map for other facilities.

The 2012 Summer Paralympics used many of the same venues as the 2012 Summer Olympics, along with two exclusive venues (Eton Manor for wheelchair tennis and Brands Hatch circuit for road cycling. All the London's purpose-built Olympic venues and facilities, including the Olympic Village, were designed with accessibility in mind so that they could accommodate the Paralympics. Some older venues also contained additional accessible seating areas during the Paralympics.

=== Public transport ===
Transport for London (TfL) operated the Paralympic Route Network (a downsized version of the Olympic Route Network operated during the Summer Olympics) to facilitate road traffic between venues and facilities. The network provided 8.7 miles (14.0 kilometres) of lanes specifically reserved for Paralympic athletes and officials. TfL continued to operate its Get Ahead of the Games website during the Paralympics, which provided updates and advice for commuters during the Games. Prior to the Games, concerns were raised by TfL commissioner Peter Hendy that London's transportation system might not be able to handle the Paralympics adequately. He feared that the end of the school summer holiday (which fell during the Games) would result in increased traffic, and that commuters might not heed traffic warnings or change their travel behaviour as they had during the Olympics.

Sevenoaks railway station was designated as the preferred station for spectators travelling to watch the cycling at Brands Hatch. Organisers chose Sevenoaks over the closer Swanley railway station because of its "existing step-free access and excellent transport links", and because Swanley did not yet have a wheelchair lift. Whilst organisers did not believe that Swanley would be able to have wheelchair lifts installed by the start of the Paralympics, the station finished their installation by early August 2012.

=== Lead-up and promotion ===
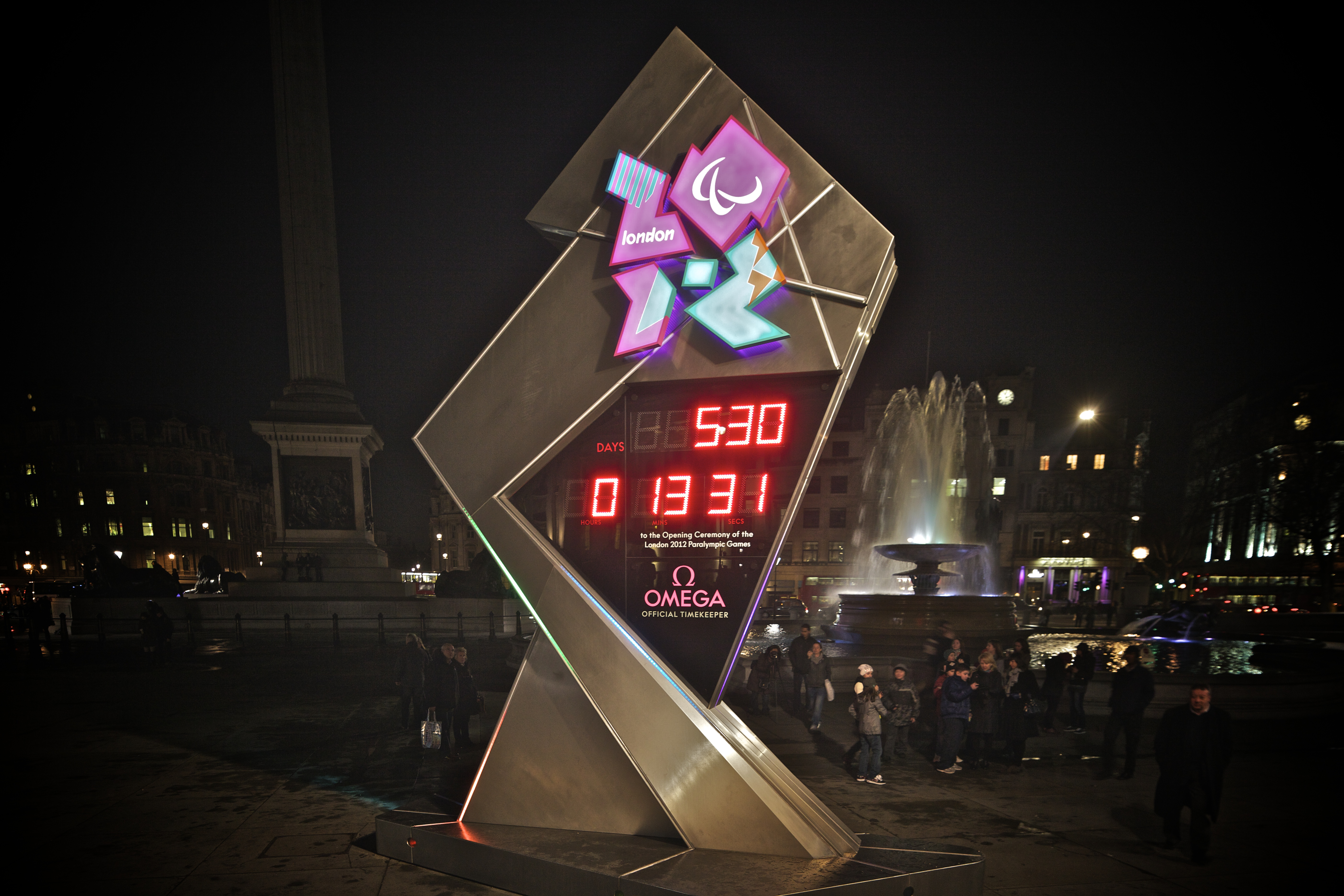
A digital clock in Trafalgar Square, counting down to the opening ceremony of the 2012 Summer Paralympics

==== Handover ceremony ====
The formal handover occurred during the closing ceremony of the 2008 Summer Paralympics in Beijing, when Mayor of London Boris Johnson received the Paralympic Flag from Mayor of Beijing Guo Jinlong. This was followed by a cultural presentation by Britain, which was a which was a sequel to the presentation during the Antwerp Ceremony during the Olympics closing ceremonies. It featured urban dance group ZooNation, the Royal Ballet, and Candoco, a physically integrated dance group, all dressed as London commuters and waiting for a bus by a zebra crossing. A double-decker bus drove around the stadium, guided by Ade Adepitan, to music composed by Philip Sheppard. The top of the bus was open and folded down to show a privet hedge featuring London landmarks such as Tower Bridge, The Gherkin and the London Eye. Cherisse Osei, drummer for Mika, and Sam Hegedus then performed, before the top of the bus folded up into its original form, sporting multi-coloured Paralympic livery. Both the Paralympic and Olympic flags were formally raised outside of London's City Hall on 26 September 2008. British Paralympians Helene Raynsford and Chris Holmes raised the Paralympic flag.

==== Paralympic Day and Super Saturday ====
On 8 September 2011, Trafalgar Square staged International Paralympic Day to coincide with a visit to London by representatives of the IPC. Hosted by Rick Edwards, Ade Adepitan and Iwan Thomas, the event featured showcases and demonstrations of the 20 sports that would feature during the Games, with some sessions also made inclusive to people with hearing disabilities. It also included appearances by Paralympic athletes Oscar Pistorius, Ellie Simmonds and Sascha Kindred, and the unveiling of a bronze statue of Pistorius by Ben Dearnley. Prime Minister David Cameron and Mayor of London Boris Johnson also appeared.

Two days later on 10 September, supermarket chain Sainsbury's and Channel 4 presented Sainsbury's Super Saturday, a family event at Clapham Common. The event featured showcases of Paralympic sports, and a concert featuring pop music acts including Nicola Roberts, Olly Murs, The Wanted, Will Young, Pixie Lott, Dappy, Sugababes, The Saturdays, Chipmunk and Taio Cruz.

==== Channel 4 promotional campaign ====
Channel 4—the new broadcaster of the Paralympics in Great Britain—developed a multi-platform advertising campaign to promote its coverage. The broadcaster sought to change the public perception of the Paralympics, encouraging viewers to see them as an "event in its own right", rather than as an afterthought to the Olympics. The campaign included television adverts, online content, and billboard advertising, some of which carrying the slogan "Thanks for the warm-up".

As part of the campaign, Channel 4 produced a two-minute-long trailer for its coverage entitled Meet the Superhumans, which was directed by Tom Tagholm with input from Deborah Poulton, 2012 Paralympic Project Leader and Alison Walsh, Editorial Manager of Disability, both at Channel 4. The trailer, set to Public Enemy's song "Harder Than You Think", focused on the competitive and "superhuman" aspects of Paralympic sport, while acknowledging the personal events and struggles that reflected every athlete's participation in the Games. Meet the Superhumans premiered on 17 July 2012, airing simultaneously on 78 different commercial television channels in the UK (which included rival commercial channels ITV and Sky1).

The advert was met with critical acclaim: Adweek's Tim Nudd declared it "the summer's most stunning sports commercial", while Simon Usborne of The Independent felt it was "an act of branding genius" and "a clear bid to bring the Paralympics from the sporting wings to centre stage." The advert was seen by an estimated audience of 10 million viewers; Channel 4's marketing and communications chief Dan Brooke estimated that reaction to the advert through social media was double that of the première of the BBC's trailer for its Olympics coverage.

Meet the Superhumans won a Golden Lion award at the Cannes Lions Festival in June 2013, losing the overall award to the railway safety PSA Dumb Ways to Die. Sir John Hegarty, the jury president said of it: "When you've got some really outstanding work it is tragic in some ways it can't get a bigger award, but there can only be one grand prix", while jury member Carlo Cavallone added "[Meet the Superhumans] is an amazing campaign, one of the golds that went through [the judging process] immediately ... Everyone felt it had the highest level of craft. It puts an issue that was really important before London 2012 to raise awareness of the Paralympics [and] they were hyper successful ... Dumb Ways to Die was a tough contender."

==== Royal Mail stamps and gold post boxes ====
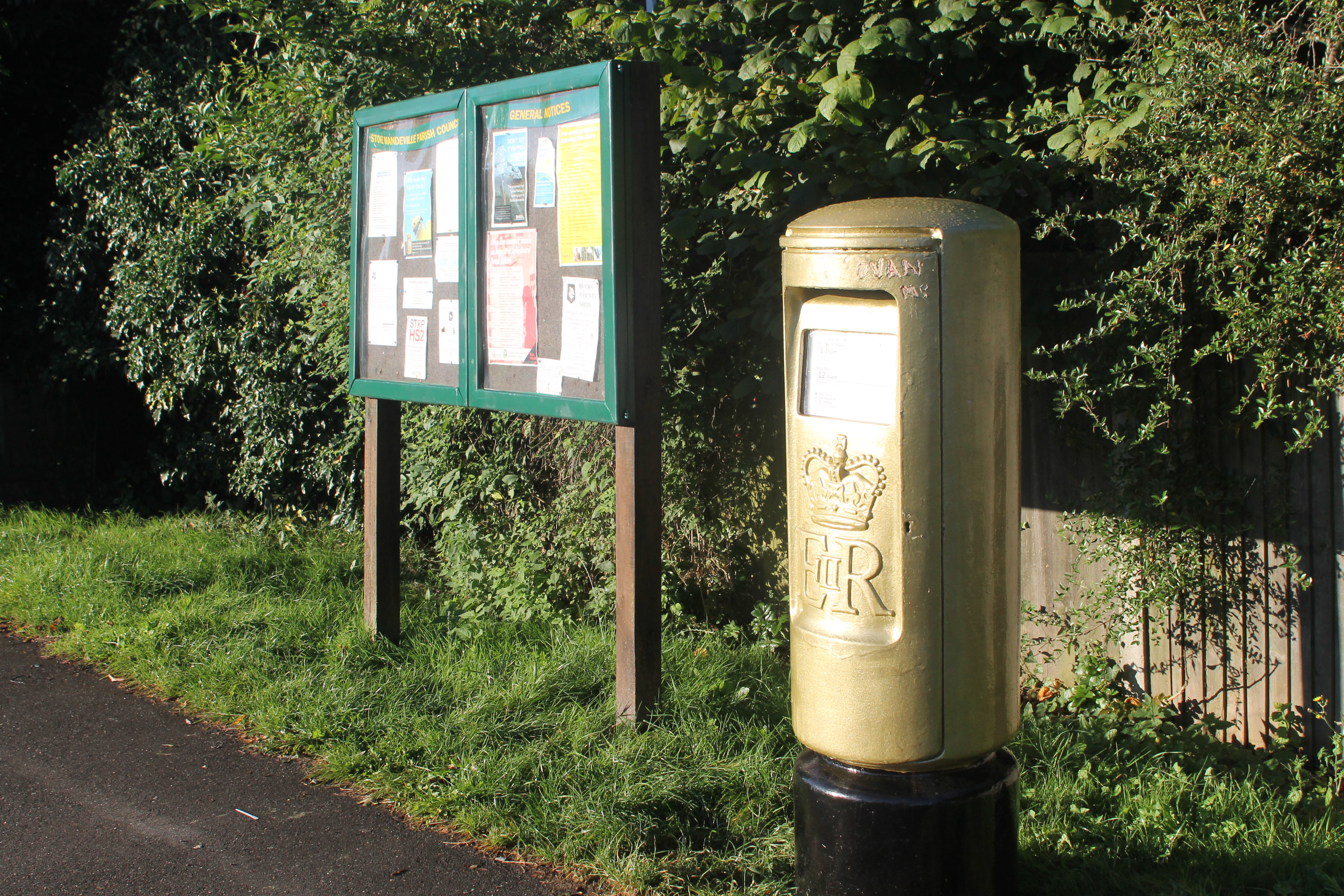
A post box outside the National Spinal Injuries Centre in Stoke Mandeville was painted gold in honour of the village's role in the history of the Paralympic movement.

In August 2009, Royal Mail unveiled a series of 30 stamps (reflecting the 30th Olympiad) in honour of the 2012 Olympic and Paralympic Games, released in batches of ten between 2009 and July 2011. Each stamp featured an Olympic or Paralympic sport and the London 2012 logo.

As it had done during the Olympics, Royal Mail honoured Britain's Paralympic gold medallists by painting a post box gold in each of their home towns (along with an additional post box outside the National Spinal Injuries Centre in Stoke Mandeville, in honour of its role in the Games' history), and featured them on commemorative stamps released throughout the Games. Royal Mail originally planned only to release a series of six stamps with group portraits of Britain's medallists; however, the decision was met with backlash from critics, who argued that the organisation was discriminating against Paralympians by not granting them the same individual recognition as their Olympian counterparts. Olympic shadow minister Tessa Jowell was also critical of Royal Mail's plan, saying that the stamps were a symbolic aspect of Britain's celebration of the Olympics and that "it would be a shame if this important symbol was not offered to our Paralympian heroes as well."

Royal Mail initially defended its decision, arguing that it would have been "logistically and practically impossible" to issue individual stamps for each gold medallist, since it expected the British team to meet or exceed its performance at Beijing of 42 gold medals. As a result of the criticism, Royal Mail announced on 15 August 2012 that it would release individual stamps for each British gold medallist during the Paralympics.

==== Test events ====
Several Paralympics-specific events were held during the London Prepares series of test events for the Olympic and Paralympic Games; these included the London International Goalball Tournament, and the London Disability Grand Prix—which was also the first Paralympic event to be held at London's Olympic Stadium.

=== Torch relay ===
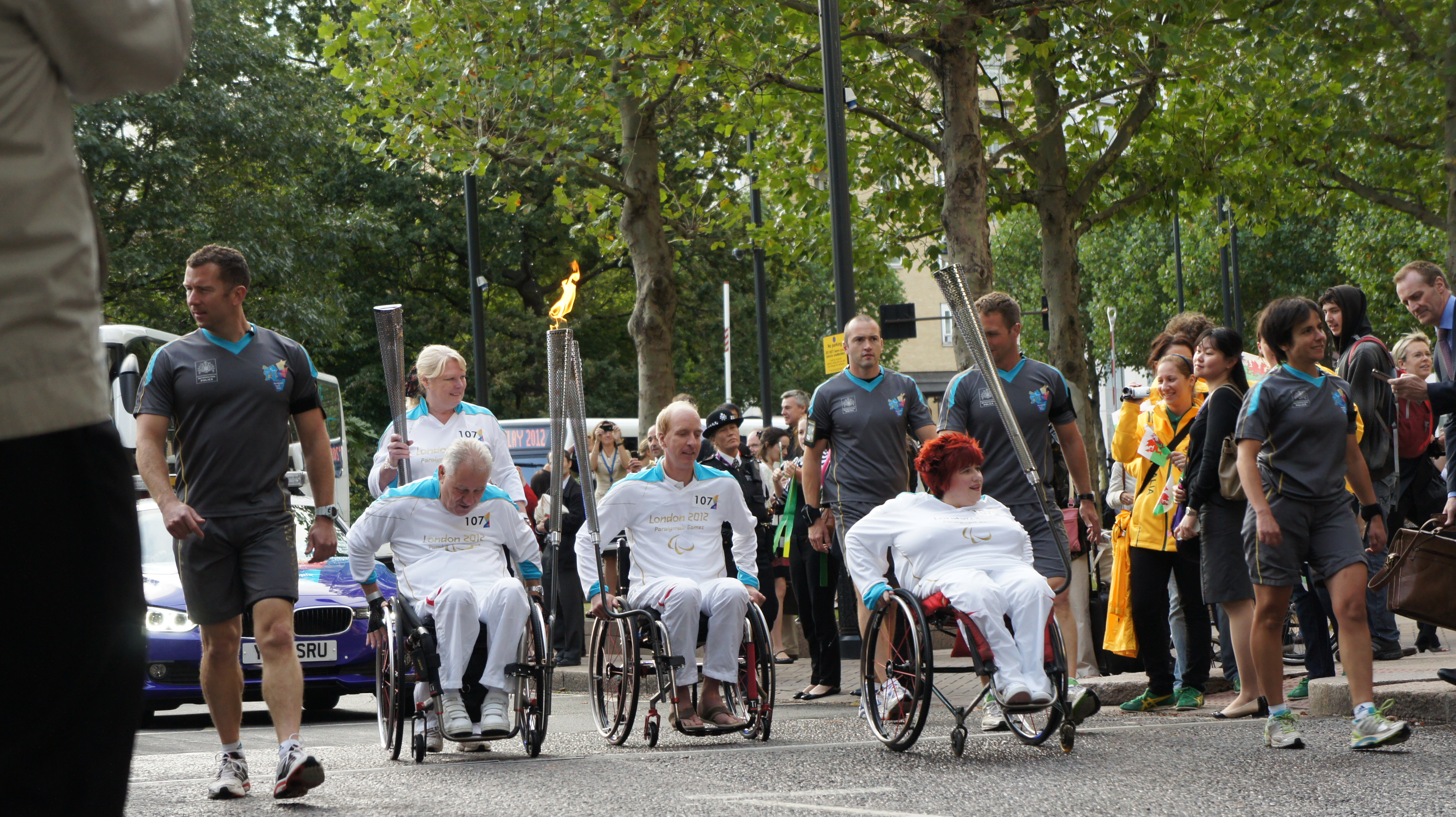
A group of torchbearers in wheelchairs bringing the Paralympic flame through Canary Wharf

The Paralympic torch relay began on 22 August, when groups of integrated scouts kindled four Paralympic flames on the highest peaks of each Home Nation: Scafell Pike in England, Ben Nevis in Scotland, Slieve Donard in Northern Ireland, and Snowdon in Wales. On 24 August the four flames were used to light ceremonial cauldrons in London, Edinburgh, Belfast and Cardiff during special "Flame Festival" events; smaller "Flame Celebration" events were also held in various communities over the bank holiday weekend.

On 28 August the four flames were united during a ceremony at Stoke Mandeville Stadium. The flame then travelled a 92-mile (148-kilometre) route to Olympic Stadium in a 24-hour relay, with 580 torchbearers working in teams of five. After a two-hour weather delay, a backup flame was taken straight to the stadium as a contingency, and the relay route was modified. However, as the opening ceremony's parade of nations took longer than expected, the flame was able to reach the external area of Olympic Stadium in time.

=== Ticketing ===
2.7 million tickets were offered in total, including event-specific tickets and those granting access solely to the Olympic Park, along with multi-event passes offered for ExCeL London and Olympic Park that were intended to allow spectators to discover a variety of Paralympic events. Unlike previous Paralympics, tickets were in extremely high demand, and the ticket allocation was increased from the originally planned 2.5 million. Whilst the period during the Olympics has historically been the busiest for Paralympic sales, 1.4 million tickets were already sold before the start of the Summer Olympics, already surpassing the total number sold in Sydney. The high demand resulted in the Ticketmaster-operated website crashing under the load.

Organisers expected the first ever sell-out in the history of the Paralympics; LOCOG's chief executive Paul Deighton remarked that "the interest in attending the Paralympics has been extraordinary from the start." This success was attributed to the enthusiasm surrounding Great Britain's performance during the Olympics, fan interest in South African sprinter Oscar Pistorius—who had become the first ever double amputee to compete in the Olympics alongside non-disabled athletes, and affordable prices.

On 8 August, LOCOG announced that 2.1 million tickets had been sold (600,000 in the previous month alone), breaking the record of 1.8 million set in Beijing (1.6 million tickets were also distributed by the Chinese government). IPC president Philip Craven congratulated London for this achievement, crediting it to "the insatiable appetite the public has for top class elite sport", and noted it would be fitting for a Paralympics held in its spiritual birthplace to have filled venues. By the opening ceremony, 2.4 million had been sold, with the remaining 100,000 sold during the Games; 10,000 were offered each day. The last 800 tickets to the opening ceremony were distributed to police and the military, while Mayor Boris Johnson arranged for the distribution of 1,100 to members of London's youth athletics clubs. Due to popular demand, a further 100,000 contingency tickets were released on 6 September (which included multi-event passes, and event tickets given up by sponsors and partners), along with 100,000 giving access solely to the Olympic Park.

=== Emblem ===
The emblems for the 2012 Summer Olympics and Paralympics were unveiled on 4 June 2007; designed by Wolff Olins, it is a stylized representation of the number "2012". For the first time, the Paralympic emblem shared a common design with the corresponding Olympics; the British Paralympic Association's chief executive Phil Lane stated that "as the founding nation for the Paralympic movement, it is fitting that Britain should lead the way in integrating the two Games."

=== Mascots ===
The official mascot of the 2012 Summer Paralympic Games, Mandeville, was unveiled alongside its Olympic counterpart Wenlock on 19 May 2010. As characters, they are portrayed as drops of steel from a steelworks in Bolton, and feature singular camera eyes —representing "focus"— with the cameras capturing aspects of the Games. Mandeville is named in honour of Stoke Mandeville due to its significance in the origins of the Paralympics. Mandeville also wears a helmet emblazoned in the red, green, and blue colours of the Paralympic emblem.

=== Opening ceremony ===
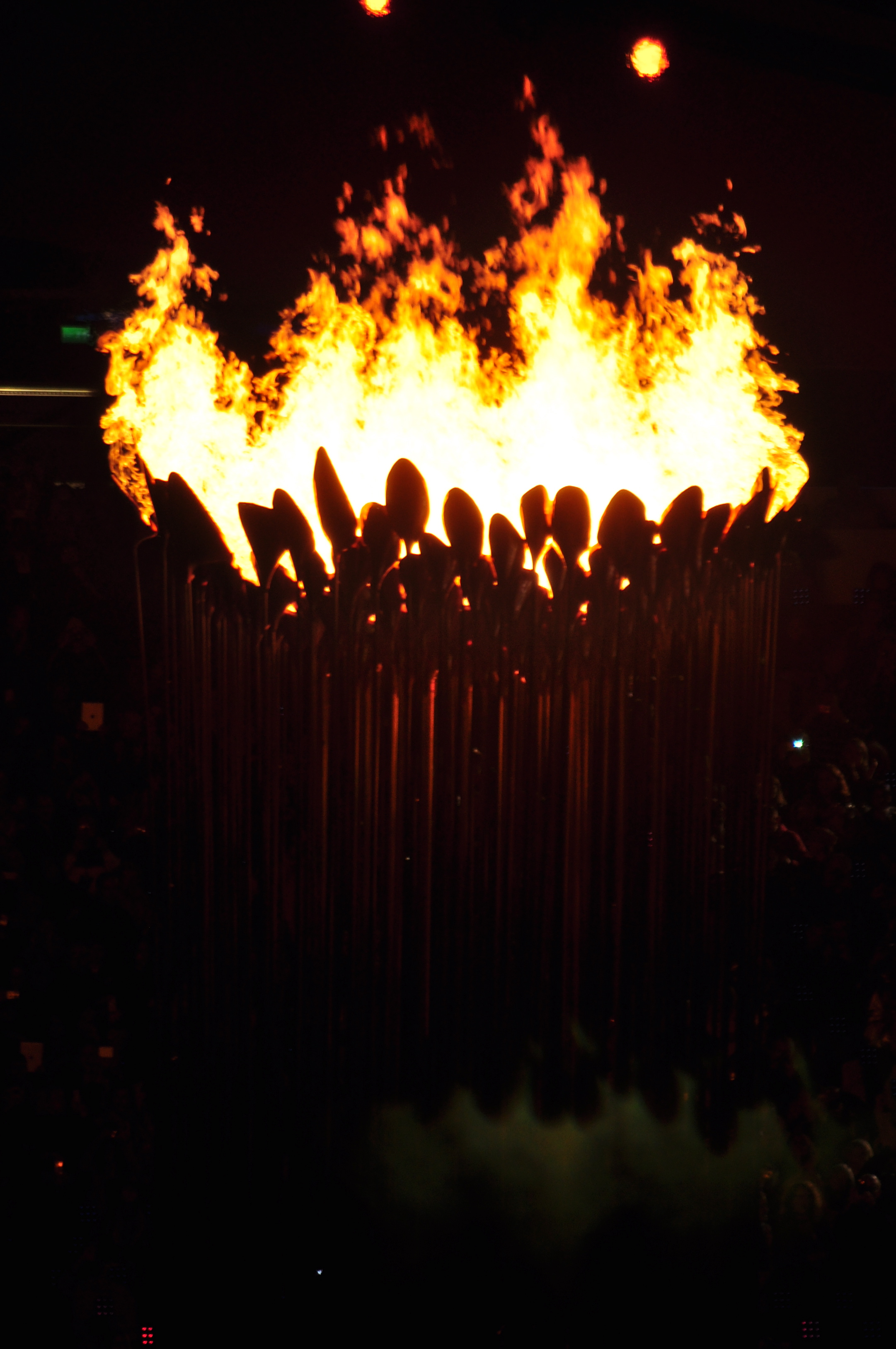
The Paralympic cauldron

The opening ceremony was held on 29 August at the Olympic Stadium. It was inspired by William Shakespeare's play The Tempest and themed around the concept of "Enlightenment", with actors Ian McKellen and Nicola Miles-Wildin playing the roles of Prospero and Miranda. It featured appearances by theoretical physicist Stephen Hawking, and performances by British electronic music group Orbital, and the Graeae Theatre Company, who performed Ian Dury's 1981 protest song "Spasticus Autisticus".

The final bearers of the Paralympic flame represented several generations of Paralympic athletes. "Future" Paralympic athlete Joe Townsend, a Royal Marine who lost both of his legs after stepping on a land mine on duty in Afghanistan, delivered the flame to Olympic Stadium via a zipline from the ArcelorMittal Orbit tower. He passed the flame to long-time British Five-a-side football captain David Clarke, who then passed it to the lighter of the Paralympic cauldron, Margaret Maughan, who was the winner of Britain's first gold medal at the first official Paralympics, in Rome.

=== Closing ceremony ===
The closing ceremony was held on 9 September at the Olympic Stadium. Entitled "The Festival of the Flame", the ceremony was themed around the gathering of people in celebration, and was directed by Kim Gavin, who also directed the closing ceremony of the Summer Olympics just a few weeks prior. The artistic programme of the ceremony was set to live performances by the British rock band Coldplay. They were accompanied by guest performers such as the British Paraorchestra (who accompanied the band on "Strawberry Swing", and also performed the Paralympic anthem), Barbadian singer Rihanna (who performed "We Found Love", and her collaboration with Coldplay, "Princess of China") and American rapper Jay-Z (who performed "Run This Town" with Rihanna and Coldplay, and joined in a reprise of "Paradise").

During their closing remarks, LOCOG chief Sebastian Coe and IPC president Philip Craven both congratulated London for its successful hosting of the Paralympics; Coe was proud that both the Olympics and Paralympics in London could be labelled "Made in Britain", while Sir Phillip felt that the Games were the "greatest Paralympic Games ever." The Paralympic flag was handed over from Boris Johnson, Mayor of London to Eduardo Paes, Mayor of Rio de Janeiro, host of the 2016 Summer Paralympics. Ellie Simmonds and Jonnie Peacock shared the honour of extinguishing the Paralympic cauldron, sharing its last flame on torches to others throughout the stadium to represent its eternal spirit.

== The Games ==
=== Participating National Paralympic Committees ===
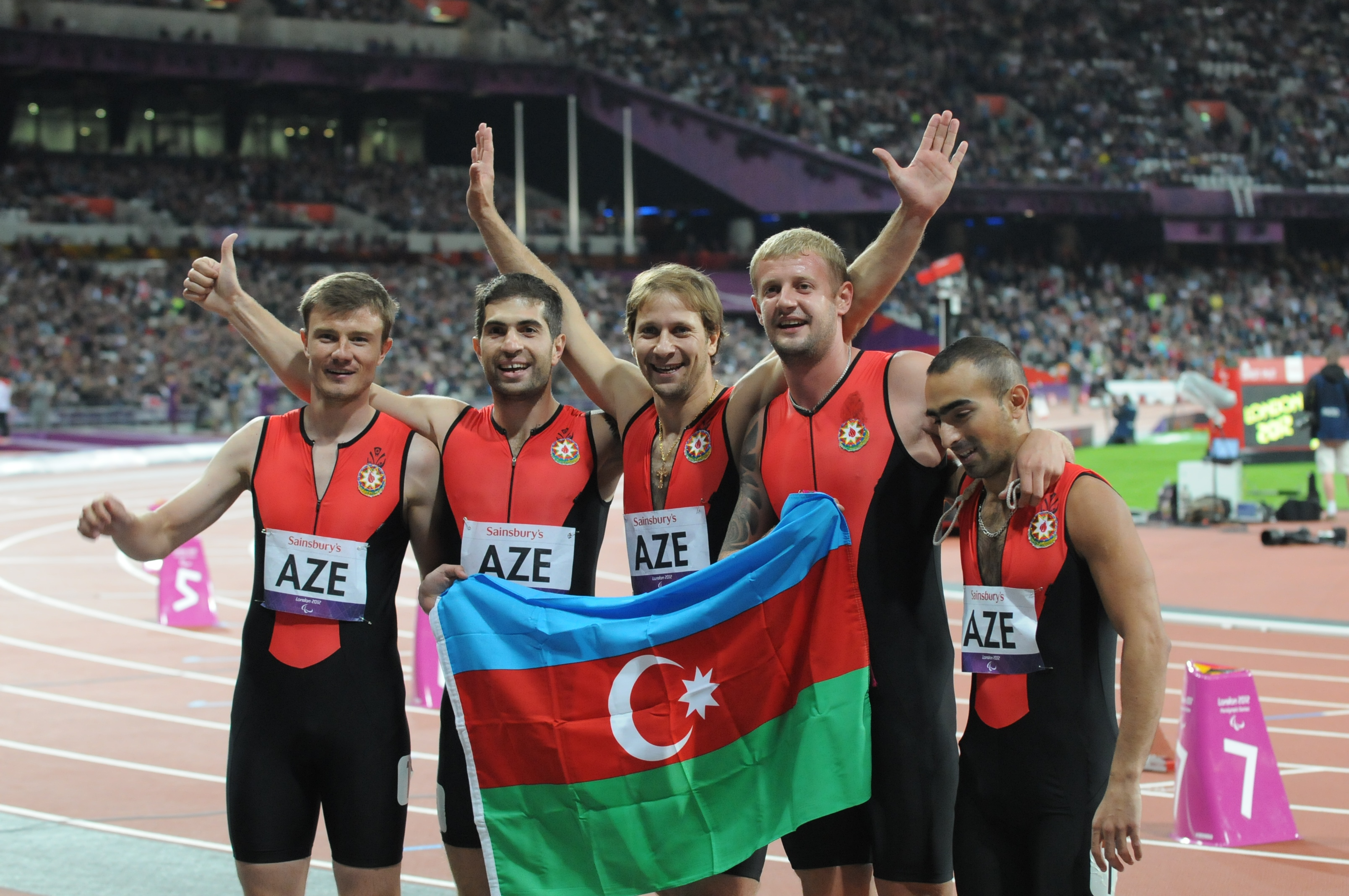
Azerbaijani athletics team at the 2012 Summer Paralympics

London 2012 had the largest number of athletes and participating nations of any Paralympic Games before. A total of 4,243 athletes from 164 countries competed in the Games. This represented an increase of 291 athletes and 18 countries from the 2008 Games, which had 3,952 athletes from 146 countries.

Fourteen countries made their Paralympic debut: Antigua and Barbuda, Brunei, Cameroon, Comoros, the Democratic Republic of the Congo, Djibouti, the Gambia, Guinea-Bissau, Liberia, Mozambique, North Korea, San Marino, the Solomon Islands and the US Virgin Islands. Trinidad and Tobago returned to the Games for the first time since 1988.

Andorra made its debut in the Summer Paralympics, having already made three appearances at the Winter Paralympics. Malawi, which would have been making its debut at the Games, and Botswana, were both due to send delegations but withdrew hours before the opening ceremony citing a lack of government funds.

The following National Paralympic Committees sent delegations to compete:

Participating National Paralympic Committees
- Afghanistan (1)
- Albania (1)
- Algeria (31)
- Andorra (1)
- Angola (4)
- Antigua and Barbuda (1)
- Argentina (60)
- Armenia (2)
- Australia (160)
- Austria (32)
- Azerbaijan (21)
- Bahrain (2)
- Barbados (1)
- Belarus (31)
- Belgium (40)
- Benin (1)
- Bermuda (1)
- Bosnia and Herzegovina (12)
- Brazil (181)
- Brunei (1)
- Bulgaria (8)
- Burkina Faso (2)
- Burundi (1)
- Cambodia (1)
- Cameroon (1)
- Canada (147)
- Cape Verde (1)
- Central African Republic (1)
- Chile (7)
- China (284)
- Colombia (37)
- Comoros (1)
- Democratic Republic of the Congo (2)
- Costa Rica (2)
- Croatia (25)
- Cuba (22)
- Cyprus (3)
- Czech Republic (46)
- Denmark (28)
- Djibouti (1)
- Dominican Republic (2)
- Ecuador (2)
- Egypt (40)
- El Salvador (1)
- Estonia (3)
- Ethiopia (4)
- Faroe Islands (1)
- Fiji (1)
- Finland (35)
- France (158)
- Gabon (1)
- The Gambia (2)
- Georgia (2)
- Germany (152)
- Ghana (4)
- Great Britain (294) (host)
- Greece (62)
- Guatemala (1)
- Guinea-Bissau (2)
- Haiti (3)
- Honduras (1)
- Hong Kong (28)
- Hungary (33)
- Iceland (4)
- India (10)
- Indonesia (4)
- Iran (79)
- Iraq (19)
- Ireland (49)
- Israel (25)
- Italy (98)
- Ivory Coast (4)
- Jamaica (3)
- Japan (135)
- Jordan (8)
- Kazakhstan (7)
- Kenya (13)
- North Korea (1)
- South Korea (88)
- Kuwait (6)
- Kyrgyzstan (1)
- Laos (1)
- Latvia (8)
- Lebanon (1)
- Lesotho (1)
- Liberia (1)
- Libya (2)
- Lithuania (11)
- Macau (2)
- Macedonia (2)
- Madagascar (1)
- Malaysia (23)
- Mali (1)
- Malta (1)
- Mauritania (2)
- Mauritius (2)
- Mexico (81)
- Moldova (2)
- Mongolia (6)
- Montenegro (1)
- Morocco (30)
- Mozambique (2)
- Myanmar (2)
- Namibia (5)
- Nepal (2)
- Netherlands (91)
- New Zealand (24)
- Nicaragua (2)
- Niger (2)
- Nigeria (27)
- Norway (22)
- Oman (2)
- Pakistan (2)
- Palestine (2)
- Panama (2)
- Papua New Guinea (2)
- Peru (1)
- Philippines (9)
- Poland (100)
- Portugal (30)
- Puerto Rico (2)
- Qatar (1)
- Romania (5)
- Russia (181)
- Rwanda (14)
- Samoa (2)
- San Marino (1)
- Saudi Arabia (4)
- Senegal (1)
- Serbia (14)
- Sierra Leone (1)
- Singapore (8)
- Slovakia (34)
- Slovenia (22)
- Solomon Islands (1)
- South Africa (62)
- Spain (133)
- Sri Lanka (7)
- Suriname (1)
- Sweden (59)
- Switzerland (25)
- Syria (5)
- Chinese Taipei (18)
- Tajikistan (1)
- Tanzania (1)
- Thailand (49)
- Timor-Leste (1)
- Tonga (1)
- Trinidad and Tobago (2)
- Tunisia (31)
- Turkey (69)
- Turkmenistan (5)
- Uganda (2)
- Ukraine (150)
- United Arab Emirates (15)
- United States (223)
- Uruguay (1)
- Uzbekistan (10)
- Vanuatu (1)
- Venezuela (27)
- Vietnam (11)
- Virgin Islands (1)
- Zambia (2)
- Zimbabwe (2)

==== Number of athletes by National Paralympic Committees (by alphabetical order) ====
IPC	Country	Athletes
AFG	Afghanistan	1
ALB	Albania	1
ALG	Algeria	31
AND	Andorra	1
ANG	Angola	4
ANT	Antigua and Barbuda	1
ARG	Argentina	60
ARM	Armenia	2
AUS	Australia	160
AUT	Austria	32
AZE	Azerbaijan	21
BRN	Bahrain	2
BAR	Barbados	1
BLR	Belarus	31
BEL	Belgium	40
BEN	Benin	1
BER	Bermuda	1
BIH	Bosnia and Herzegovina	12
BRA	Brazil	181
BRU	Brunei	1
BUL	Bulgaria	8
BUR	Burkina Faso	2
BDI	Burundi	1
CAM	Cambodia	1
CMR	Cameroon	1
CAN	Canada	147
CPV	Cape Verde	1
CAF	Central African Republic	1
CHI	Chile	7
CHN	China	284
COL	Colombia	37
COM	Comoros	1
COD	Democratic Republic of the Congo	2
CRC	Costa Rica	2
CRO	Croatia	25
CUB	Cuba	22
CYP	Cyprus	3
CZE	Czech Republic	46
DEN	Denmark	28
DJI	Djibouti	1
DOM	Dominican Republic	2
ECU	Ecuador	2
EGY	Egypt	40
ESA	El Salvador	1
EST	Estonia	3
ETH	Ethiopia	4
FRO	Faroe Islands	1
FIJ	Fiji	1
FIN	Finland	35
FRA	France	158
GAB	Gabon	1
GAM	The Gambia	2
GEO	Georgia	2
GER	Germany	152
GHA	Ghana	4
GBR	Great Britain	294
GRE	Greece	62
GUA	Guatemala	1
GBS	Guinea-Bissau	2
HAI	Haiti	3
HON	Honduras	1
HKG	Hong Kong	28
HUN	Hungary	33
ISL	Iceland	4
IND	India	10
INA	Indonesia	4
IRI	Iran	79
IRQ	Iraq	19
IRL	Ireland	49
ISR	Israel	25
ITA	Italy	98
CIV	Ivory Coast	4
JAM	Jamaica	3
JPN	Japan	135
JOR	Jordan	8
KAZ	Kazakhstan	7
KEN	Kenya	13
PRK	North Korea	1
KOR	South Korea	88
KUW	Kuwait	6
KGZ	Kyrgyzstan	1
LAO	Laos	1
LAT	Latvia	8
LIB	Lebanon	1
LES	Lesotho	1
LBR	Liberia	1
LBA	Libya	2
LTU	Lithuania	11
MAC	Macau	2
MKD	Macedonia	2
MAD	Madagascar	1
MAS	Malaysia	23
MLI	Mali	1
MLT	Malta	1
MTN	Mauritania	2
MRI	Mauritius	2
MEX	Mexico	81
MDA	Moldova	2
MGL	Mongolia	6
MNE	Montenegro	1
MAR	Morocco	30
MOZ	Mozambique	2
MYA	Myanmar	2
NAM	Namibia	5
NEP	Nepal	2
NED	Netherlands	91
NZL	New Zealand	24
NCA	Nicaragua	2
NIG	Niger	2
NGR	Nigeria	27
NOR	Norway	22
OMA	Oman	2
PAK	Pakistan	2
PLE	Palestine	2
PAN	Panama	2
PNG	Papua New Guinea	2
PER	Peru	1
PHI	Philippines	9
POL	Poland	100
POR	Portugal	30
PUR	Puerto Rico	2
QAT	Qatar	1
ROU	Romania	5
RUS	Russia	181
RWA	Rwanda	14
SAM	Samoa	2
SMR	San Marino	1
KSA	Saudi Arabia	4
SEN	Senegal	1
SRB	Serbia	14
SLE	Sierra Leone	1
SIN	Singapore	8
SVK	Slovakia	34
SLO	Slovenia	22
SOL	Solomon Islands	1
RSA	South Africa	62
ESP	Spain	133
SRI	Sri Lanka	7
SUR	Suriname	1
SWE	Sweden	59
SUI	Switzerland	25
SYR	Syria	5
TPE	Chinese Taipei	18
TJK	Tajikistan	1
TAN	Tanzania	1
THA	Thailand	49
TLS	Timor-Leste	1
TGA	Tonga	1
TRI	Trinidad and Tobago	2
TUN	Tunisia	31
TUR	Turkey	69
TKM	Turkmenistan	5
UGA	Uganda	2
UKR	Ukraine	150
UAE	United Arab Emirates	15
USA	United States	223
URU	Uruguay	1
UZB	Uzbekistan	10
VAN	Vanuatu	1
VEN	Venezuela	27
VIE	Vietnam	11
ISV	Virgin Islands	1
ZAM	Zambia	2
ZIM	Zimbabwe	2
Total		4,302

=== Sports ===
The programme of the 2012 Summer Paralympics featured events in 20 sports. The number of events in each sport is noted in parentheses.

- Archery (9)
- Athletics (170)
- Boccia (7)
- Cycling
  - Road (30)
  - Track (20)
- Equestrian (11)
- Football 5-a-side (1)
- Football 7-a-side (1)
- Goalball (2)
- Judo (13)
- Powerlifting (20)
- Rowing (4)
- Sailing (3)
- Shooting (12)
- Swimming (148)
- Table tennis (29)
- Volleyball (2)
- Wheelchair basketball (2)
- Wheelchair fencing (12)
- Wheelchair rugby (1)
- Wheelchair tennis (6)

Events for athletes with intellectual disabilities (ID class) returned to the Paralympics in athletics, swimming, and table tennis for the first time since 2000. ID events had been suspended following the 2000 Summer Paralympics, after the Spanish basketball team was stripped of their gold medals when it was found that only 2 of their 12 team members actually had an intellectual disability. The IPC introduced a new procedure involving "sports intelligence" testing to better determine eligibility for the ID class.

Also beginning in 2012, sighted guides became eligible to receive medals in certain events; sighted goalkeepers in 5-a-side football, along with guides and pilots in athletics and cycling and boccia assistants were now able to receive medals for their contributions. Previously in the case of tandem cycling, where a visually-impaired rider takes the rear of the bike with a sighted pilot in front, only the visually-impaired rider actually received a medal.

=== Calendar ===
The official schedule was published on 25 August 2011.

All dates are British Summer Time (UTC+1)

OC	Opening ceremony	●	Event competitions	1	Gold medal events	CC	Closing ceremony

August/September 2012		August			September									Events
August/September 2012		29th Wed	30th Thu	31st Fri	1st Sat	2nd Sun	3rd Mon	4th Tue	5th Wed	6th Thu	7th Fri	8th Sat	9th Sun	Events
Ceremonies		OC											CC	—N/a
Archery			●	●	●	●	4	3	2					9
Athletics				11	17	20	17	21	20	21	16	23	4	170
Boccia						●	●	3	●	●	●	4		7
Cycling	Road cycling								18	4	6	4		50
Cycling	Track cycling		5	5	5	3								50
Equestrian			●	●	2	3	2	4						11
Football	5-a-side			●	●	●	●	●	●	●	●	1		2
Football	7-a-side				●	●	●	●	●	●	●		1	2
Goalball			●	●	●	●	●	●	●	●	2			2
Judo			4	4	5									13
Powerlifting			2	3	3	3	3	3	3					20
Rowing				●	●	4								4
Sailing					●	●	●	●	●	3				3
Shooting			2	2	2	1	1	1	1	2				12
Swimming			15	15	15	14	14	15	15	15	15	15		148
Table tennis			●	●	●	11	10	●	●	●	4	4		29
Volleyball			●	●	●	●	●	●	●	●	1	1		2
Wheelchair basketball			●	●	●	●	●	●	●	●	1	1		2
Wheelchair fencing								4	4	2	1	1		12
Wheelchair rugby									●	●	●	●	1	1
Wheelchair tennis					●	●	●	●	1	●	2	3		6
Daily medal events			28	40	49	59	51	54	64	47	48	57	6	503
Cumulative total			28	68	117	176	227	281	345	392	440	497	503	503
August/September 2012		29th Wed	30th Thu	31st Fri	1st Sat	2nd Sun	3rd Mon	4th Tue	5th Wed	6th Thu	7th Fri	8th Sat	9th Sun	Total events
August/September 2012		August			September									Total events

=== Medal count ===
This table is based on the medal count of the International Paralympic Committee (IPC).

The ranking is sorted primarily by the number of gold medals earned by a National Paralympic Committee (NPC). The number of silver medals is taken into consideration next and then the number of bronze medals. If countries are still tied, equal ranking is given and they are listed alphabetically by IPC Country Code.

* Host nation (Host nation (Great Britain))

2012 Summer Paralympics medal table
Rank	NPC	Gold	Silver	Bronze	Total
1	China (CHN)	95	71	65	231
2	Russia (RUS)	36	38	28	102
3	Great Britain (GBR)*	34	43	43	120
4	Ukraine (UKR)	32	24	28	84
5	Australia (AUS)	32	23	30	85
6	United States (USA)	31	29	38	98
7	Brazil (BRA)	21	14	8	43
8	Germany (GER)	18	26	22	66
9	Poland (POL)	14	13	9	36
10	Netherlands (NED)	10	10	19	39
11–75	Remaining NPCs	180	212	226	618
Totals (75 entries)		503	503	516	1,522

=== Multiple medallists ===
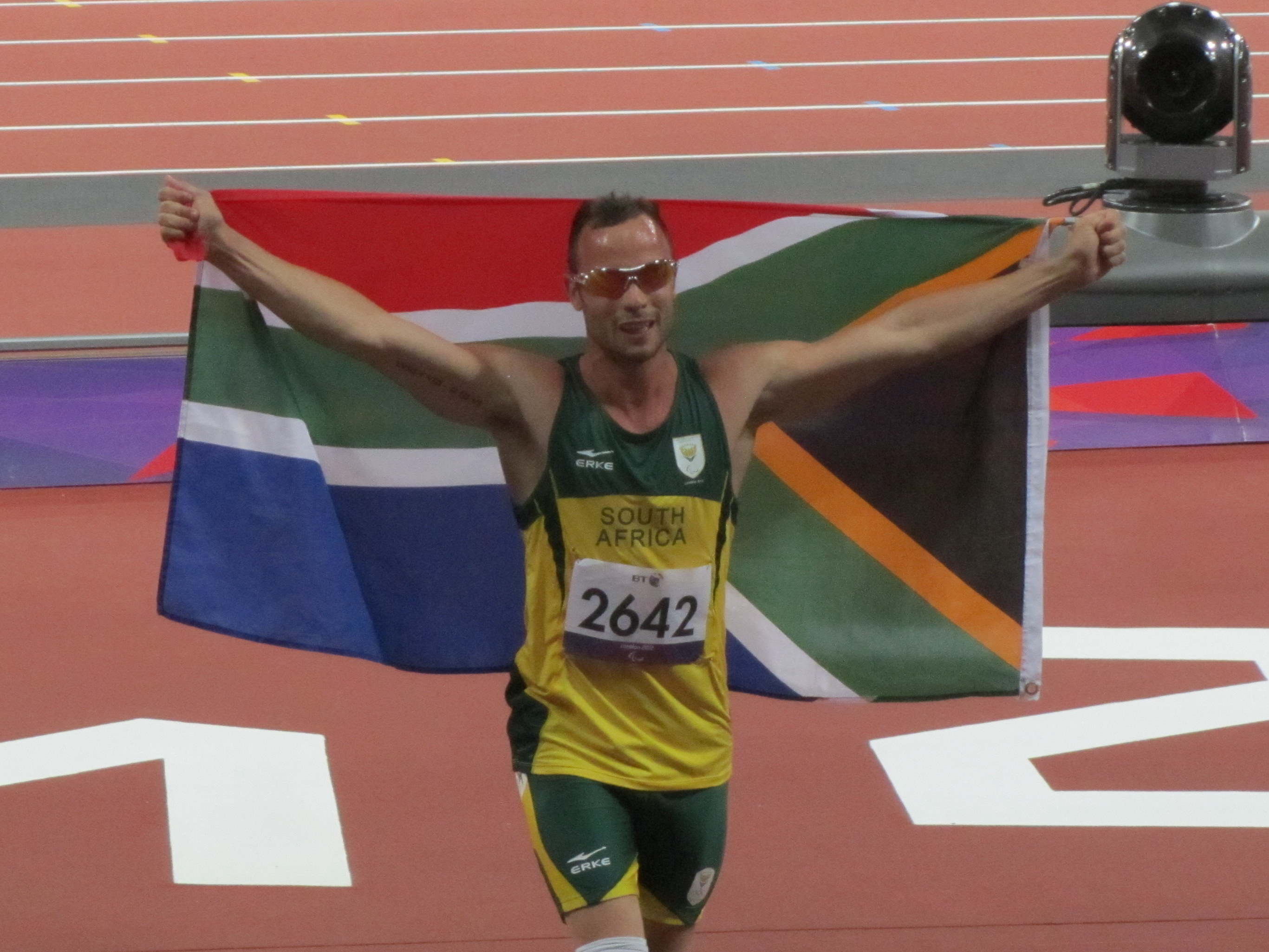
Oscar Pistorius wins the 400m T44 final

#	Athlete	Sport	Gold medal	Silver medal	Bronze medal
1	(Australia) Jacqueline Freney	Swimming	8	0	0
2	(Brazil) Daniel Dias	Swimming	6	0	0
3	(Australia) Matthew Cowdrey	Swimming	5	2	1
3	(United States) Jessica Long	Swimming	5	2	1
5	(Belarus) Ihar Boki	Swimming	5	1	0
6	(Russia) Oxana Savchenko	Swimming	5	0	0
7	(Australia) Ellie Cole	Swimming	4	0	2
8	(United States) Raymond Martin	Athletics	4	0	0
8	(China) Xu Qing	Swimming	4	0	0
8	(United Kingdom) Sarah Storey	Cycling	4	0	0
8	(United Kingdom) Dave Weir	Athletics	4	0	0
8	(China) Yang Yang	Swimming	4	0	0
13	(New Zealand) Sophie Pascoe	Swimming	3	3	0
14	(China) Yang Bozun	Swimming	3	2	1
15	(Brazil) André Brasil	Swimming	3	2	0
16	(China) Wang Yinan	Swimming	3	1	1
17	(South Africa) Natalie Du Toit	Swimming	3	1	0
17	(Ukraine) Nataliia Prologaieva	Swimming	3	1	0
19	(United States) Tatyana McFadden	Athletics	3	0	1
19	(Ukraine) Maksym Veraksa	Swimming	3	0	1
21	(United States) Marianna Davis	Cycling	3	0	0
22	(Ukraine) Yevheniy Bohodayko	Swimming	2	2	0
22	(Norway) Sarah Louise Rung	Swimming	2	2	0
22	(China) Pan Shiyun	Swimming	2	2	0
25	(Canada) Summer Ashley Mortimer	Swimming	2	1	1
25	(United Kingdom) Eleanor Simmonds	Swimming	2	1	1
27	(South Africa) Oscar Pistorius	Athletics	2	1	0
27	(United States) Bradley Snyder	Swimming	2	1	0
27	(Italy) Alex Zanardi	Cycling	2	1	0
29	(United States) Kelley Becherer	Swimming	2	0	2
29	(Italy) Cecilia Camellini	Swimming	2	0	2
31	(China) Du Jianping	Swimming	2	0	1
32	(China) Zhang Bian	Table tennis	2	0	0
32	(Australia) Blake Cochrane	Swimming	2	0	0
32	(United Kingdom) Hannah Cockroft	Athletics	2	0	0
32	(Ukraine) Yegor Dementyev	Cycling	2	0	0
32	(Australia) Katherine Downie	Swimming	2	0	0
32	(China) Xia Jiangbo	Swimming	2	0	0
32	(China) Liu Jing	Table tennis	2	0	0
32	(China) Ma Lin	Table tennis	2	0	0
32	(China) Lei Lina	Table tennis	2	0	0
32	(China) Feng Panfeng	Table tennis	2	0	0
32	(Republic of Ireland) Mark Rohan	Cycling	2	0	0
32	(Republic of Ireland) Jason Smyth	Athletics	2	0	0
32	(Russia) Timur Tuchinov	Archery	2	0	0
32	(Netherlands) Esther Vergeer	Wheelchair tennis	2	0	0
32	(China) Zhou Ying	Table tennis	2	0	0

== Broadcasting ==
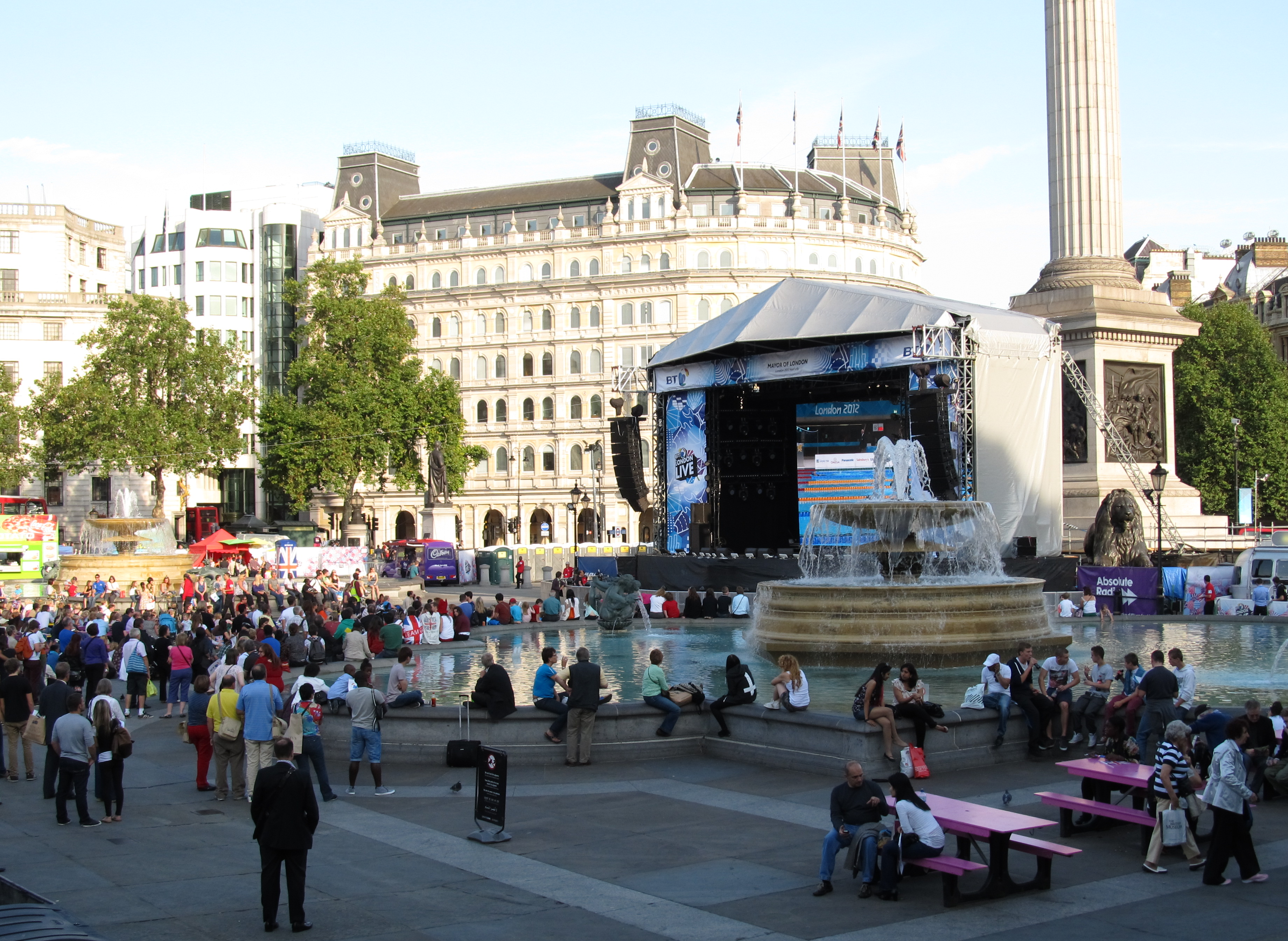
A public viewing event on the BT London Live stage at Trafalgar Square

Broadcast rights to the 2012 Summer Paralympics were sold to local broadcasters by LOCOG, with production of the world feeds sub-contracted to Olympic Broadcasting Services (OBS). The Games saw a significant growth in media coverage for the Paralympics; LOCOG reached deals with over 36 broadcasters to televise the Games in over 100 countries. LOCOG chief Sebastian Coe stated that "beyond how the commercial value of this package has raised the bar financially for the Paralympic movement, the fantastic broadcast coverage we have agreed will help us take advantage of this opportunity to inspire disabled people of all ages to take up sport and be a catalyst for continued change in public attitudes towards disability." LOCOG reached deals with broadcasters such as China Central Television, the Korean Broadcasting System, NHK, Rede Globo and SporTV in Brazil, the Television Pool of Thailand, and the Australian Broadcasting Corporation to air coverage. The games were to be broadcast on television in the United Kingdom by Channel 4, replacing the BBC in a £9 million deal; the BBC still held radio rights, with coverage on BBC Radio 5 Live and 5 Live Sports Extra. The IPC webcast approximately 780 hours of its coverage through its YouTube channel, with four streams of coverage in English and one in Spanish.

Channel 4's coverage of the Games was billed as the most extensive Paralympic coverage ever broadcast in the United Kingdom; it promised over 150 hours of live coverage throughout the Games on Channel 4 and sister channel More4, and additional coverage online and through special pop-up channels carried by Freesat, Sky and Virgin TV. The broadcaster invested around £600,000 towards training new on-air personalities with expertise in parasports, with many of them also having disabilities themselves. They would be joined by Channel 4 News anchor Jon Snow, and BBC Sport personality Clare Balding. Channel 4 also broadcast supplemental programming to lead towards the Games, such as Paralympic-focused documentaries, other IPC championships, and the weekly magazine programme That Paralympic Show. During the Games, comedian Adam Hills (who himself was born without a right leg, and hosted the Australian Broadcasting Corporation's coverage of the Beijing Paralympics) would host The Last Leg, a comedic aftershow that followed the conclusion of each night's coverage. Channel 4's coverage of the Games drew relatively high viewership; its coverage of the opening ceremony was seen by an average of 7.6 million viewers, a 40% share, and peaked at 11.2 million viewers—making it one of Channel 4's most-watched programmes in network history. Prime time coverage saw an average of 3.3 million viewers nightly, while viewership peaked at 4.5 million viewers during the men's T44 200m final where Alan Oliveira beat Oscar Pistorius for the gold medal. Its coverage of the closing ceremony peaked at 7.7 million viewers.

Similarly extensive coverage was televised by RTVE in Spain, with approximately 150 hours of live coverage on Teledeporte and TVE HD. The Australian Broadcasting Corporation aired over 100 hours of coverage across its networks during the Paralympics, with coverage on both ABC1 and ABC2. Coverage of the Games set viewership records for ABC, peaking at 1.6 million viewers on average (in comparison to 1.3 million in Beijing), while ABC2 peaked at a 4.7% viewership share, beating competing digital networks. ABC's coverage was also nominated for a Logie Award for "Most Popular Sports Program".

In the United States, NBC Sports provided five-and-a-half hours of coverage in total, and no live coverage. NBCSN aired one-hour highlight shows, and NBC broadcast a special recapping the Games on 16 September. The United States Olympic & Paralympic Committee provided extensive coverage through its own digital outlets. Critics and American athletes expressed disappointment at NBC for its decision not to broadcast any live coverage of the Games. In Canada, rights were held by Canada's Olympic Broadcast Media Consortium; TSN (English) and RDS (French) produced daily hour-long highlight programs (some of which were aired by CTV Television), while tape-delayed airings of the opening ceremony were carried by Sportsnet One, TSN2, RDS, and RDS2. The coverage was simulcast with open audio descriptions by AMI-tv, a network which broadcasts programming with accommodations for those who are visually or hearing impaired. AMI-tv also broadcast supplemental programming, such as a daily news program from London and a documentary series focusing on Canadian athletes at the Paralympics.

=== Paralympic Media Awards ===
The Telegraph Media Group won the Best Written (print and online) award and Channel 4 won the best broadcast award. The best radio award went to BBC World Service and Larry Wong working for Edmonton Journal won the best photo prize for his image of Benoit Huot.

== Controversies ==
=== Atos involvement ===
The role of IT company Atos as a technology provider and official sponsor of the Paralympic Games was criticised by disability-rights groups, due to its contract with Britain's Department for Work and Pensions to carry out capability assessments that determine eligibility for disability benefits. They argued that Atos's programme had lacked integrity and was intended to help cut government spending, since the assessments have resulted in many workers with disabilities being incorrectly judged as "fit for work" and denied benefits. Therefore, the groups considered it hypocritical for Atos to sponsor the Games, whilst simultaneously operating a programme that has negatively affected the lives of residents with disabilities. UK Uncut, a political group opposed to public-service budget cuts, held a series of protests dubbed "The Atos Games" to coincide with the start of the Paralympics, culminating with joint demonstrations with Disabled People Against Cuts outside the London headquarters of both Atos and the Department for Work and Pensions on 31 August 2012. Speaking at the protests, comedian Jeremy Hardy said that the programme's intent to "victimise people with disabilities" was "blatant and shameless".

During the opening ceremony some British athletes reportedly obscured the Atos logo on their accreditation passes in protest of their involvement. However, an official from the British Paralympic Association denied that this had been the case. LOCOG defended Atos's involvement, stating that the company was "a critical and valued member of [the companies] delivering these Games", due to the technologies it has provided, which included information systems for managing volunteers and distributing event results.

=== Ticketing ===
Controversy arose about seating rules for wheelchair users, after two mothers with disabilities accused LOCOG of having discriminatory policies. One claimed she had been told by a LOCOG staff member that spectators in a wheelchair area at the Velodrome could only be accompanied by one adult, and children could not attend without being accompanied by another non-disabled adult, while another was told that her ability to sit in a wheelchair area with her children at ExCeL London was "not guaranteed". A petition for improved access for families with disabilities, started by one of the mothers on Change.org, quickly collected over 30,000 signatures. LOCOG denied having discriminatory policies, stating that parents with disabilities could steward their children in wheelchair seating areas at events with unreserved seats, but may not all be able to sit together at events with reserved seating.

LOCOG faced further criticism for how it handled the sale of tickets for the wheelchair areas within venues. In May 2012 the online sale of tickets for wheelchair areas was replaced by a dedicated telephone hotline. Organisers were criticised for their use of an 0844 revenue share number for this hotline, and for neglecting to mention on its ticketing website that calls would be charged by the minute. Former sports minister Gerry Sutcliffe viewed this as discrimination against wheelchair users, and called upon LOCOG to compensate those who had used the hotline. LOCOG denied that it was receiving additional profits from the phone line, and claimed that a dedicated line was being used to allow customers to receive a service tailored to their individual accessibility needs.

A minor incident occurred involving blind Member of Parliament David Blunkett, who was attending the opening ceremony alongside a Channel 4 director. Blunkett was denied access to his seat at Olympic Stadium because there was no room for his guide dog, and had to watch the ceremony from seats in the stadium's gantry instead. However, Blunkett noted that this was an isolated incident and chose not to make an issue of it, simply advising organisers to "seek to find a solution rather than impose a preconceived notion of what is or is not possible".

=== British television coverage ===
British official broadcaster Channel 4 received some criticism for its coverage of the Paralympics. Users of Twitter complained that its coverage of the opening ceremony contained too many commercial breaks, drawing comparisons to similar complaints faced by NBC during the Olympics' opening ceremony; unlike the BBC, who televised the Olympics in the United Kingdom, both NBC and Channel 4 are supported by advertising. Complaints noted that Channel 4 had shown five ad breaks within the first hour of the ceremony, and that ironically, it had recently broadcast a six-hour long late-night dance music special with no adverts at all. Channel 4 defended the criticism by stating that it had broadcast "significantly fewer" commercials than normal for prime time programming during the ceremony, and that the ad breaks were needed in order to help the channel invest in broadcasting programming such as the Paralympics. Criticism was also made towards comments made by Jon Snow and Krishnan Guru-Murthy during the telecast; Snow was criticized for making comments about war-torn countries during the parade of nations, while Guru-Murthy received similar criticism for quipping that "looking at the ages of these athletes, which have been helpfully provided to us, they're really quite old."

Channel 4 was also accused of showing too many studio segments during the first few days of the Games rather than live events, and for missing several notable events involving British athletes, including a swimming heat where Eleanor Simmonds set a new personal best and almost beat the world record, Sarah Storey winning her eleventh Paralympic medal, and Great Britain's opening wheelchair basketball game against Germany. Channel 4 noted that time was needed during the first few days to explain Paralympic events and the classification system to viewers, and that it was operating three additional channels' worth of live coverage throughout the Games. The broadcaster also stated that it had to make editorial decisions on which events to air during periods where a large number of events were in progress. The amount of live coverage was also affected by Olympic Broadcasting Services, who did not send cameras or provide official television coverage for sports such as cycling, the marathon, and shooting. Channel 4's news department did send its own cameramen to film the affected events for highlights, but was unable to broadcast them live.

=== American television coverage ===
In the United States, NBC Sports held the broadcast rights to both the Olympics and Paralympics in 2012. NBC had been frequently criticised in past years by American athletes and IPC officials for its minimal coverage of past Paralympics, and it was speculated by critics that NBC's history of inadequate coverage may have impacted New York City's bid for the 2012 Summer Olympics and Paralympics. In 2008, it did not air any coverage while the Games were in progress (neither live or delayed), choosing to air a recap documentary on NBC in November 2008, followed by a week of highlights on Universal Sports. While relatively larger than its Beijing coverage, NBC produced only five-and-a-half hours of specials featuring tape delayed highlights of the Games; most of them aired on pay-TV channel NBCSN, while the last aired on NBC a week following the conclusion of the Games. No coverage of the opening and closing ceremonies, nor any live coverage, was provided. By contrast, some broadcasters (such as the host broadcasters, and broadcasters in Australia and Spain) planned to air at least 100 hours or more of coverage from London, and NBC itself had provided extensive coverage of the London Olympics, which was heavily viewed.

NBC's lack of coverage drew the ire of American disability rights groups and IPC president Philip Craven, who expressed his disappointment for American athletes and viewers who were unable to fully experience the games on television. Craven remarked that "some people think that North America always [leads] on everything, and on this they don't. It's about time they caught up." Following the closing ceremonies, Craven hinted that the IPC might exercise greater scrutiny on broadcasters at future Paralympics by stating that "if we find our values don't fit, we'll have to go somewhere else." NBC acquired the rights to the 2014 and 2016 Paralympic Games in September 2013; the broadcaster vowed to air a relatively larger amount of Paralympic coverage from Sochi and Rio de Janeiro respectively—in particular, NBC and NBCSN were to air at least 66 hours from Rio. Craven praised NBC's decision to devote a relatively larger amount of airtime to future Paralympics, sharing his hope that U.S. audiences would be "as captivated and emotionally enthralled as the billions around the world who tuned in to London 2012 last summer."

=== Women's discus medals ===
During the women's class F35/36 discus competition, an error in scoring caused the wrong medals to be presented. In this combined class event, final standings were determined based on a points calculation. The calculation converted distances thrown into points, to account for the different functional impairments of the participating athletes. Due to an error in the scoring system, the gold medal in the event was originally awarded to Ukrainian athlete Mariia Pomazan. When the mistake was discovered, the recalculated points showed that Chinese athlete Wu Qing had finished first, with Pomazan in second place. A second medal ceremony was held, which Pomazan did not attend in protest. She was eventually required to return her gold medal.

== See also ==
- Queen Elizabeth Olympic Park
- 2017 World Para Athletics Championships, para-athletics event also held at the London Stadium

Preceded by Beijing	Summer Paralympics; London; XIV Paralympic Summer Games (2012)	Succeeded by Rio de Janeiro
