= Athletics at the 2012 Summer Paralympics – Men's shot put =

The men's shot put athletics events for the 2012 Summer Paralympics took place at the London Olympic Stadium from 31 August to 8 September 2012. A total of 11 events were contested incorporating 19 different classifications.

== Schedule ==
Event↓/Date →	Fri 31	Sat 1	Sun 2	Mon 3	Tue 4	Wed 5	Thr 6	Fri 7
F11–12				F				
F20								F
F32–33						F		
F34				F				
F37–38				F				
F40							F	
F42–44	F							
F46							F	
F52–53	F							
F54–56		F						
F57–58					F			

== Results ==
=== F11–12 ===
Rank	Athlete	Nationality	Class	1	2	3	4	5	6	Best	Score	Notes
1st place, gold medalist(s)	Andrii Holivets	Ukraine	F12	x	15.00	15.16	15.54	16.25	16.03	16.25	991	RR
2nd place, silver medalist(s)	Vladimir Andryushchenko	Russia	F12	14.39	14.05	14.23	14.55	15.21	x	15.21	966	SB
3rd place, bronze medalist(s)	Russell Short	Australia	F12	14.45	14.33	14.17	14.23	14.73	14.26	14.73	950	SB
4	Vasyl Lishchynskyi	Ukraine	F11	12.58	11.72	11.84	12.52	13.09	12.80	13.09	945	
5	David Casino	Spain	F11	12.57	12.56	13.01	x	x	13.01	13.01	942	
6	Siarhei Hrybanau	Belarus	F12	13.43	13.48	13.63	13.32	13.65	x	13.65	906	
7	Sergei Shatalov	Russia	F12	13.02	12.36	13.04	x	13.02	13.63	13.63	905	
8	Bil Marinkovic	Austria	F11	11.79	11.91	11.98	12.21	x	x	12.21	903	SB
9	Edwin Rodriguez Gonzales	Colombia	F11	10.13	10.46	11.33	-	-	-	11.33	845	
10	Rolandas Urbonas	Lithuania	F12	12.13	11.79	12.14	-	-	-	12.14	810	
11	Ronald Carlos Greene	Trinidad and Tobago	F11	9.59	10.87	10.20	-	-	-	10.87	807	PB
12	Anibal Bello	Venezuela	F11	10.00	10.83	x	-	-	-	10.83	804	
13	Mahdi Al-Saadi	Iraq	F12	10.99	10.80	11.12	-	-	-	11.12	719	
14	Sebastian Baldassarri	Argentina	F11	9.39	9.87	9.16	-	-	-	9.87	705	
15	Isaac Leiva	Guatemala	F11	9.59	9.83	8.65	-	-	-	9.83	700	
16	Hameed Hassain	Iraq	F11	9.41	9.14	9.81	-	-	-	9.81	698	
17	Alfonso Olivero Encarnacion	Dominican Republic	F11	9.54	9.80	x	-	-	-	9.80	697	PB
18	Nelson Gonçalves	Portugal	F11	9.51	9.52	9.74	-	-	-	9.74	689	
19	Sergio Paz	Argentina	F11	9.12	9.13	9.43	-	-	-	9.43	650	
20	Luciano dos Santos Pereira	Brazil	F11	8.63	9.29	9.26	-	-	-	9.29	632	
-	Osamah Masaud Al Shanqiti	Saudi Arabia	F12	x	x	x	-	-	-	NM	0	

=== F20 ===
Rank	Athlete	Nationality	1	2	3	4	5	6	Best	Notes
1st place, gold medalist(s)	Todd Hodgetts	Australia	15.62	15.42	16.24	16.29	15.86	15.36	16.29	WR
2nd place, silver medalist(s)	Jeffrey Ige	Sweden	13.84	14.61	15.50	14.56	14.80	13.64	15.50	RR
3rd place, bronze medalist(s)	Muhammad Ziyad Zolkefli	Malaysia	13.79	15.21	x	14.35	14.13	14.36	15.21	PB
4	Efstratios Nikolaidis	Greece	13.43	13.89	14.29	13.41	x	14.51	14.51	PB
5	Danyelo Hernandez	Venezuela	12.95	11.39	13.10	13.03	13.34	13.18	13.34	PB
6	Lindsay Sutton	Australia	13.04	12.02	12.28	12.87	13.03	12.68	13.04	
7	Ronny Valdes	Venezuela	12.53	12.33	12.68	x	12.79	x	12.79	PB
8	Kostas Dibidis	Greece	12.67	x	12.79	x	x	12.55	12.79	
9	Jüri Bergmann	Estonia	11.86	12.09	11.93	–	–	–	12.09	PB
10	Dali Fatnassi	Tunisia	x	11.35	11.99	–	–	–	11.99	
11	Damien Rumeau	France	11.36	11.02	x	–	–	–	11.36	
12	Ricardo Marques	Portugal	10.97	10.86	x	–	–	–	10.97	
13	Jose Benitez Sanchez	Puerto Rico	x	9.88	x	–	–	–	9.88	

=== F32–33 ===
Rank	Athlete	Nationality	Class	1	2	3	4	5	6	Best	Score	Notes
1st place, gold medalist(s)	Kamel Kardjena	Algeria	F33	11.73	12.14	10.65	8.59	10.57	10.20	12.14	997	PR
2nd place, silver medalist(s)	Karim Betina	Algeria	F32	10.37	x	x	10.14	x	x	10.37	976	
3rd place, bronze medalist(s)	Mounir Bakiri	Algeria	F32	9.49	8.12	x	8.26	8.96	8.65	9.49	929	
4	Maciej Sochal	Poland	F32	9.18	8.91	x	8.50	8.63	x	9.18	908	RR
5	Youssef Ouaddali	Morocco	F32	7.93	7.41	7.18	8.39	8.32	7.64	8.39	844	PB
6	Mohammad Naser	Kuwait	F32	7.61	7.71	7.95	6.89	7.20	7.42	7.95	800	RR
7	Ahmed Alhousani	United Arab Emirates	F33	7.76	x	8.89	8.45	8.27	8.33	8.89	800	SB
8	Dimitrios Zisidis	Greece	F32	7.08	7.24	7.48	7.17	7.21	7.27	7.48	747	SB
9	Hani Alnakhli	Saudi Arabia	F33	7.94	8.16	7.90	-	-	-	8.16	724	
10	Mourad Idoudi	Tunisia	F33	x	7.65	x	-	-	-	7.65	664	
11	Naser M S Saleh	Kuwait	F33	7.46	x	x	-	-	-	7.46	639	
-	Abdulaziz Alshekaili	United Arab Emirates	F33	x	x	x	-	-	-	NM	0	

=== F34 ===
Rank	Athlete	Nationality	1	2	3	4	5	6	Best	Notes
1st place, gold medalist(s)	Azeddine Nouiri	Morocco	12.20	13.10	12.69	11.76	12.05	12.09	13.10	WR
2nd place, silver medalist(s)	Mohsen Kaedi	Iran	11.64	12.51	12.52	12.94	12.31	12.72	12.94	RR
3rd place, bronze medalist(s)	Thierry Cibone	France	12.23	x	11.94	11.50	11.34	12.86	12.86	RR
4	Alexander El'min	Russia	12.76	12.11	11.82	11.76	12.23	11.32	12.76	PB
5	Mauricio Valencia	Colombia	11.62	11.18	11.82	x	x	x	11.82	RR
6	Kyle Pettey	Canada	11.41	x	11.41	x	11.15	10.99	11.41	SB
7	Daniel West	Great Britain	11.37	10.63	10.63	10.67	11.00	11.20	11.37	=PB
8	Wang Yanzhang	China	11.00	10.79	10.86	10.12	10.67	10.65	11.00	PB
9	Abdulrahman Abdulqadir Abdulrahman	Qatar	9.27	9.45	10.86	–	–	–	10.86	PB
10	Mohamed Ali Krid	Tunisia	10.55	10.21	9.81	–	–	–	10.55	SB
11	Hamish MacDonald	Australia	10.11	10.34	10.31	–	–	–	10.34	PB
12	Damien Bowen	Australia	10.21	10.19	x	–	–	–	10.21	
13	Jean Pierre Talatini	France	x	10.18	10.08	–	–	–	10.18	
14	Jonathan Adams	Great Britain	8.53	9.23	9.84	–	–	–	9.84	
15	Raymond O'Dwyer	Ireland	8.27	8.66	8.86	–	–	–	8.86	
	Salman Abbariki	Iran	x	x	x	–	–	–	NM	

=== F37–38 ===
Rank	Athlete	Nationality	Class	1	2	3	4	5	6	Best	Notes
1st place, gold medalist(s)	Xia Dong	China	F37	17.26	17.52	x	16.33	x	16.86	17.52	WR
2nd place, silver medalist(s)	Ibrahim Ahmed Abdelwareth	Egypt	F38	14.71	15.15	15.53	14.99	15.17	15.44	15.53	PR
3rd place, bronze medalist(s)	Javad Hardani	Iran	F38	15.27	14.47	15.34	x	14.41	15.43	15.43	RR
4	Oleksandr Doroshenko	Ukraine	F38	15.02	14.26	14.69	x	14.22	14.93	15.02	
5	Tomasz Blatkiewicz	Poland	F37	14.86	15.18	14.80	x	x	14.67	15.18	PB
6	Mindaugas Bilius	Lithuania	F37	14.38	x	15.16	14.07	14.36	14.73	15.16	PB
7	Hamdi Ouerfelli	Tunisia	F38	13.24	x	x	x	12.68	13.74	13.74	
8	Dušan Grézl	Czech Republic	F38	12.88	12.67	12.99	x	13.40	12.65	13.40	PB
9	Ahmed Meshaima	Bahrain	F37	13.52	13.39	13.33	-	-	-	13.52	PB
10	Mykola Zhabnyak	Ukraine	F37	12.59	13.08	12.99	-	-	-	13.08	
11	Khusniddin Norbekov	Uzbekistan	F37	11.92	12.79	13.03	-	-	-	13.03	
12	Ivan Panafidin	Uzbekistan	F38	9.69	9.76	x	-	-	-	9.76	SB

=== F40 ===
Rank	Athlete	Nationality	1	2	3	4	5	6	Best	Notes
1st place, gold medalist(s)	Wang Zhiming	China	14.46	13.28	12.61	12.67	12.40	12.43	14.46	WR
2nd place, silver medalist(s)	Hocine Gherzouli	Algeria	12.29	12.51	12.57	x	12.26	12.91	12.91	RR
3rd place, bronze medalist(s)	Paschalis Stathelakos	Greece	x	12.34	12.78	x	x	x	12.78	
4	Bartosz Tyszkowski	Poland	11.92	11.37	x	11.98	x	11.81	11.98	
5	Kyron Duke	Great Britain	10.28	10.56	10.34	9.89	10.84	11.24	11.24	PB
6	Sofyane Mejri	Tunisia	10.07	10.71	10.64	10.81	x	11.07	11.07	
7	Jonathan De Souza Santos	Brazil	10.88	x	x	x	10.40	10.37	10.88	
8	Kovan Abdulraheem	Iraq	10.14	10.60	10.40	x	9.88	9.69	10.60	PB
9	Wildan Nukhailawi	Iraq	9.93	9.34	10.46	-	-	-	10.46	SB
10	Alexandros Michail Konstantinidis	Greece	10.38	x	9.93	-	-	-	10.38	
11	Mohamed Amara	Tunisia	9.99	9.84	9.98	-	-	-	9.99	
12	Clemarot Christian Nikoua-Rosel	Central African Republic	9.52	9.24	9.68	-	-	-	9.68	PB

=== F42–44 ===
Rank	Athlete	Nationality	Class	1	2	3	4	5	6	Best	Score	Notes
1st place, gold medalist(s)	Jackie Christiansen	Denmark	F44	17.29	17.87	x	17.62	x	18.16	18.16	1012	
2nd place, silver medalist(s)	Darko Kralj	Croatia	F42	14.21	13.34	13.87	14.05	13.80	x	14.21	987	
3rd place, bronze medalist(s)	Aled Davies	Great Britain	F42	12.86	12.83	13.63	13.59	13.19	13.78	13.78	961	
4	Kang Guofeng	China	F42	12.34	12.68	x	13.29	x	13.41	13.41	935	
5	Mladen Tomic	Croatia	F42	10.94	12.19	12.64	13.00	11.73	12.37	13.00	903	
6	Shaquille Vance	United States	F42	12.25	11.11	11.63	12.06	12.02	x	12.25	837	
7	Josip Slivar	Croatia	F44	14.13	15.07	14.36	x	14.46	x	15.07	828	
8	Adrian Matusik	Slovakia	F44	13.84	15.03	14.67	x	14.48	14.03	15.03	825	
9	Alexander Filatov	Russia	F44	14.58	14.41	x	–	–	–	14.58	788	
10	Frank Tinnemeier	Germany	F42	10.95	x	11.14	–	–	–	11.14	718	
11	Josue Cajuste	Haiti	F42	7.19	7.03	7.63	–	–	–	7.63	238	

=== F46 ===
Rank	Athlete	Nationality	1	2	3	4	5	6	Best	Notes
1st place, gold medalist(s)	Nikita Prokhorov	Russia	13.46	14.61	15.68	14.92	14.73	14.86	15.68	WR
2nd place, silver medalist(s)	Hou Zhanbiao	China	14.64	15.57	14.80	15.19	15.22	14.84	15.57	RR
3rd place, bronze medalist(s)	Tomasz Rebisz	Poland	13.93	14.32	15.01	x	14.69	14.61	15.01	SB
4	Dmytro Ibragimov	Ukraine	14.97	x	14.38	14.91	x	14.33	14.97	
5	Matthias Uwe Schulze	Germany	x	12.73	14.04	13.20	x	x	14.04	
6	Soselito Sekeme	France	13.18	13.91	13.69	x	13.76	13.85	13.91	
7	Andis Ozolnieks	Latvia	13.45	13.21	12.88	12.79	12.77	13.19	13.45	PB
8	Abdullah S A S A Alsaleh	Kuwait	13.10	12.76	13.09	12.94	x	12.79	13.10	PB
9	Ravil Diganshin	Uzbekistan	12.31	x	12.44	-	-	-	12.44	

=== F52–53 ===
Rank	Athlete	Nationality	Class	1	2	3	4	5	6	Best	Score	Notes
1st place, gold medalist(s)	Aigars Apinis	Latvia	F52	9.60	10.23	8.80	x	x	x	10.23	1039	WR
2nd place, silver medalist(s)	Mauro Maximo de Jesus	Mexico	F53	8.53	8.08	8.68	8.15	8.39	8.36	8.68	977	SB
3rd place, bronze medalist(s)	Scot Severn	United States	F53	8.07	8.14	8.26	8.26	8.16	8.18	8.26	884	
4	Ales Kisy	Czech Republic	F53	8.07	8.23	7.95	7.83	8.00	8.19	8.23	878	SB
5	Peter Martin	New Zealand	F52	8.22	8.62	8.36	7.70	8.10	8.07	8.62	726	PB
6	Che Jon Fernandes	Greece	F53	7.36	7.35	6.99	4.53	7.20	7.10	7.36	681	
7	Henrik Plank	Slovenia	F52	6.58	6.65	6.47	6.28	6.46	6.57	6.65	357	
	Georgios Karaminas	Greece	F52	x	x	x	–	–	–	–	NM	
	Gerasimos Vryonis	Greece	F53	x	x	x	–	–	–	–	NM	

=== F54–56 ===
Rank	Athlete	Nationality	Class	1	2	3	4	5	6	Best	Score	Notes
1st place, gold medalist(s)	Jalil Bagheri Jeddi	Iran	F55	10.81	11.09	10.93	11.27	11.57	11.63	11.63	988	PR
2nd place, silver medalist(s)	Karol Kozun	Poland	F55	10.85	10.58	11.36	x	10.67	11.22	11.36	973	SB
3rd place, bronze medalist(s)	Robin Womack	Great Britain	F55	9.19	11.02	11.34	10.88	10.53	10.64	11.34	972	PB
4	Khamis Zaqout	Palestine	F55	9.39	9.49	11.30	x	11.05	x	11.30	969	
5	Ulrich Iser	Germany	F55	10.75	10.61	10.68	10.07	10.78	11.01	11.01	951	SB
6	Ilias Nalmpantis	Greece	F55	10.58	10.72	10.49	10.15	10.66	10.47	10.72	931	SB
7	Krzysztof Smorszczewski	Poland	F56	12.02	12.16	12.16	11.92	12.16	12.14	12.16	929	PB
8	Draženko Mitrović	Serbia	F54	8.72	8.65	9.15	8.13	8.90	8.58	9.15	917	SB
9	Olokhan Musayev	Azerbaijan	F56	11.32	11.42	11.93	-	-	-	11.93	913	RR
10	Martin Němec	Czech Republic	F55	9.72	10.08	10.49	-	-	-	10.49	913	SB
11	Aleksi Kirjonen	Finland	F56	11.80	11.28	11.89	-	-	-	11.89	911	
12	Jacob Dahl	Denmark	F54	8.61	8.78	9.00	-	-	-	9.00	903	PB
13	Scott Winkler	United States	F55	10.12	9.54	10.35	-	-	-	10.35	902	
14	Georg Tischler	Austria	F54	8.66	8.59	8.69	-	-	-	8.69	871	
15	Ruzhdi Ruzhdi	Bulgaria	F55	9.67	9.68	9.78	-	-	-	9.78	849	
16	Mustafa Yuseinov	Bulgaria	F55	9.00	9.57	8.80	-	-	-	9.57	827	
17	Manolis Stefanoudakis	Greece	F54	7.51	7.71	7.91	-	-	-	7.91	772	
18	Leonardo Diaz	Cuba	F56	9.81	8.95	9.85	-	-	-	9.85	713	SB
19	Christian Bernardi	San Marino	F55	4.40	4.54	4.42	-	-	-	4.54	68	SB

=== F57–58 ===
Rank	Athlete	Nationality	Class	1	2	3	4	5	6	Best	Score	Notes
1st place, gold medalist(s)	Alexey Ashapatov	Russia	F58	14.98	15.61	15.95	16.17	15.81	16.20	18.16	989	PR
2nd place, silver medalist(s)	Janusz Rokicki	Poland	F58	15.19	15.53	15.68	14.10	14.96	15.06	15.68	960	SB
3rd place, bronze medalist(s)	Michael Louwrens	South Africa	F57	x	13.26	13.64	13.23	x	12.86	13.64	958	SB
4	Jamil Saleh Elshebli	Jordan	F57	13.58	x	13.51	x	12.15	12.89	13.58	954	
5	Guoshan Wu	China	F58	13.82	15.32	14.68	15.02	15.40	x	15.40	944	RR
6	Mohamad Mohamad	Syria	F57	12.54	13.12	13.11	11.66	12.44	12.54	13.12	922	
7	Claudiney Santos	Brazil	F57	12.68	12.32	12.87	12.72	12.64	12.61	12.87	902	RR
8	Anastasios Tsiou	Greece	F57	x	x	12.64	x	x	x	12.64	884	
9	Angim Dimitrios Ntomgkioni	Greece	F57	x	x	12.25	–	–	–	12.25	851	
10	Boro Radenovic	Croatia	F57	11.51	11.46	11.67	–	–	–	11.67	797	
11	Amer Ali Mustafa Al Abbadi	Jordan	F58	12.49	12.93	12.93	–	–	–	12.93	758	
12	Dennis Ogbe	United States	F58	12.84	12.36	12.81	–	–	–	12.84	750	
13	James McCarthy	Ireland	F57	10.36	10.57	10.70	–	–	–	10.70	696	
14	Fernando Mina Cortes	Colombia	F58	11.37	11.99	12.21	–	–	–	12.21	690	PB
15	Vanderson Alves da Silva	Brazil	F57	9.73	9.36	9.94	–	–	–	9.94	608	
16	Zaharani Selemani Mwenemti	Tanzania	F58	x	9.52	x	–	–	–	9.52	403	SB
17	Constant Kponhinto	Benin	F58	8.25	8.12	7.68	–	–	–	8.25	268	SB
18	Sidi Mohamed Bilal	Mauritania	F57	5.63	5.09	5.37	–	–	–	5.63	115	
