= 2014 IPC Athletics European Championships – Men's discus throw =

The men's discus throw at the 2014 IPC Athletics European Championships was held at the Swansea University Stadium from 18 to 23 August.

In the F56 event several F54 and F55 athletes entered as no competition in their classification was available. Although he finished fourth in the F56 event, Serbia's Drazenko Mitrovic (F54) recorded a distance of 33.68m with his final throw, beating his own world record set in London during the 2012 Summer Paralympics.

== Medalists ==
Event	Gold		Silver		Bronze	
F11	David Casinos; Spain	38.70	Miroslaw Madzia; Poland	35.79	Vasyl Lishchynskyi; Ukraine	35.22
F12	Kim Lopez Gonzalez; Spain	48.75	Marek Wietecki; Poland	45.69	Vladimir Andriushchenko; Russia	44.31
F34	Daniel Scheil; Germany	25.30	Kieran Tscherniawsky; Great Britain	24.28	Evgenii Malykh; Russia	21.43
F37/38	Mykola Zhabnyak (F37); Ukraine	54.89; 1015pts	Mindaugas Bilius (F37); Lithuania	49.59; 925pts	Tomasz Blatkiewicz (F37); Bulgaria	45.61; 835pts
F42	Aled Davies; Great Britain	46.46	Tom Habscheid; Luxembourg	40.42	Dechko Ovcharov; Bulgaria	38.22
F44	Dan Greaves; Great Britain	62.34 ER	Adrian Matusik; Slovakia	58.56	Ivan Katanušić; Croatia	47.39
F46	Dmytro Ibragimov; Ukraine	49.46	Nikita Prokhorov; Russia	48.56	Matthias Uwe Schulze; Germany	46.38
F52	Aigars Apinis; Latvia	19.68	Robert Jachimowicz; Poland	16.77	Henrik Plank; Slovenia	14.29
F56	Olokhan Musayev (F56); Azerbaijan	41.63	Slobodan Miletic (F55); Serbia	36.86	Mustafa Yuseinov (F55); Bulgaria	21.43
F57	Alexey Ashapatov; Russia	42.11	Janusz Rokicki; Poland	41.11	Jaroslav Petrous; Czech Republic	34.72

== Results ==
=== F11 ===
Rank	Athlete	Result	Notes
1st place, gold medalist(s)	David Casinos; Spain	38.70	
2nd place, silver medalist(s)	Miroslaw Madzia; Poland	35.79	
3rd place, bronze medalist(s)	Vasyl Lishchynskyi; Ukraine	35.22	
4	Bil Marinkovic; Austria	35.11	
5	Roman Mesyk; Ukraine	33.77	
6	Sergei Mikhalev; Russia	32.38	
7	Dusko Sretenovic; Serbia	31.86	
8	Nelson Goncalves; Portugal	28.42	
9	Vitalii Telesh; Russia	27.82	

=== F12 ===
Rank	Athlete	Result	Notes
1st place, gold medalist(s)	Kim Lopez Gonzalez; Spain	48.75	
2nd place, silver medalist(s)	Marek Wietecki; Poland	45.69	
3rd place, bronze medalist(s)	Vladimir Andriushchenko; Russia	44.31	
4	Rolandas Urbonas; Lithuania	37.28	
5	Héctor Cabrera Llácer; Spain	35.17	
6	Miljenko Vucic; Croatia	35.13	
7	Eduardo Sanca; Portugal	34.49	
8	Stefan Dimitrijevic; Serbia	33.68	
9	Albert van der Mee; Netherlands	32.69	
10	Sergei Shatalov; Russia	32.36	
11	Petteri Peitso; Finland	32.31	
—	Branimir Budetic; Croatia	DNS	

=== F34 ===
Rank	Athlete	Result	Notes
1st place, gold medalist(s)	Daniel Scheil; Germany	25.30	
2nd place, silver medalist(s)	Kieran Tscherniawsky; Great Britain	24.28	
3rd place, bronze medalist(s)	Evgenii Malykh; Russia	21.43	
4	Oleksandr Aliekseienko; Ukraine	20.01	
5	Martin Dvorak; Czech Republic	19.77	
6	Mateusz Wojnicki; Poland	17.48	

=== F37/38 ===
Rank	Athlete	Class	Result	Notes
1st place, gold medalist(s)	Mykola Zhabnyak; Ukraine	F37	54.89	
2nd place, silver medalist(s)	Mindaugas Bilius; Lithuania	F37	49.59	
3rd place, bronze medalist(s)	Tomasz Blatkiewicz; Poland	F37	45.61	
4	Oleksandr Doroshenko; Ukraine	F38	42.34	
5	Ronni Jensen; Denmark	F37	43.83	
6	Joshua Bain; Great Britain	F37	43.71	
7	Victor Svanesohn; Sweden	F38	38.35	
8	Lazaro Stefanidis; Greece	F37	39.29	
9	Donatas Dundzys; Lithuania	F37	39.06	

=== F42 ===
Rank	Athlete	Result	Notes
1st place, gold medalist(s)	Aled Davies; Great Britain	46.46	
2nd place, silver medalist(s)	Tom Habscheid; Luxembourg	40.98	
3rd place, bronze medalist(s)	Dechko Ovcharov; Bulgaria	38.22	
4	Marinos Fylachtoas; Greece	37.91	
5	Mohammad Al-Joburi; Sweden	36.09	
6	Gino de Keersmaeker; Belgium	35.84	

=== F44 ===
Rank	Athlete	Result	Notes
1st place, gold medalist(s)	Dan Greaves; Great Britain	62.34	
2nd place, silver medalist(s)	Adrian Matusik; Slovakia	58.56	
3rd place, bronze medalist(s)	Ivan Katanušić; Croatia	47.39	
4	Josip Slivar; Croatia	45.59	
5	Alexander Filatov; Russia	45.34	
6	Egert Jõesaar; Estonia	43.68	
7	Miltadis Kyriakidis; Greece	40.29	

=== F46 ===
Rank	Athlete	Result	Notes
1st place, gold medalist(s)	Dmytro Ibragimov; Ukraine	49.46	
2nd place, silver medalist(s)	Nikita Prokhorov; Russia	48.56	
3rd place, bronze medalist(s)	Matthias Schulze; Germany	46.38	
4	Alexandros Bermperis; Greece	35.08	

=== F52 ===
Rank	Athlete	Result	Notes
1st place, gold medalist(s)	Aigars Apinis; Latvia	19.68	
2nd place, silver medalist(s)	Robert Jachimowicz; Poland	16.77	
3rd place, bronze medalist(s)	Henrik Plank; Slovenia	14.29	
4	Adrian Imianowski; Poland	13.55	
5	Georgios Karaminas; Greece	11.21	
6	Miroslav Matic; Croatia	9.71	

=== F56 ===
Rank	Athlete	Class	Result	Notes
1st place, gold medalist(s)	Olokhan Musayev; Azerbaijan	F56	41.63	
2nd place, silver medalist(s)	Slobodan Miletic; Serbia	F55	36.86	
3rd place, bronze medalist(s)	Mustafa Yuseinov; Bulgaria	F55	35.70	
4	Drazenko Mitrovic; Serbia	F54	33.68	WR
5	Ruzhdi Ruzhdi; Bulgaria	F55	32.72	
6	Ilias Nalmpantis; Greece	F55	31.91	
7	Robin Womack; Great Britain	F55	30.42	
8	Milos Zaric; Serbia	F55	29.66	
9	Krzysztof Smorszczewski; Poland	F56	28.91	
10	Jovica Brkic; Serbia	F54	25.67	
11	Alexey Kuznetsov; Russia	F54	25.01	

=== F57 ===
Rank	Athlete	Result	Notes
1st place, gold medalist(s)	Alexey Ashapatov; Russia	42.11	
2nd place, silver medalist(s)	Janusz Rokicki; Poland	41.11	
3rd place, bronze medalist(s)	Jaroslav Petrous; Czech Republic	34.72	
4	Nathan Stephens; Great Britain	32.26	

== See also ==
- List of IPC world records in athletics
