= 2012 IPC Athletics European Championships – Men's shot put =

The men's shot put at the 2012 IPC Athletics European Championships was held at Stadskanaal Stadium from 24–29 July.

== Medalists ==
Results given by IPC Athletics.

Class	Gold	Silver	Bronze
F11	Vasyl Lishchynskyi; Ukraine	Bil Marinkovic; Austria	Mirosław Madzia; Poland
F12	Andrii Holivets; Ukraine	Vladimir Andryushchenko; Russia	Kim Lopez Gonzalez; Spain
F20	Jeffrey Ige; Sweden	Efstratios Nikolaidis; Greece	Kostas Dibidis; Greece
F32/33/34	Alexander El'Min; Russia	Darko Majdandzic; Croatia	Maciej Sochal; Poland
F37	Mindaugas Bilius; Lithuania	Mykola Zhabnyak; Ukraine	Aleksei Lesnykh; Russia
F38	Oleksandr Doroshenko; Ukraine	Thomas Loosch; Germany	Dusan Grezl; Czech Republic
F40	Paschalis Stathelakos; Greece	Alexandros Michail Konstantinidis; Greece	N/A
F42	Frank Tinnemeier; Germany	Mladen Tomic; Croatia	David Jonsson; Iceland
F44	Jackie Christiansen; Denmark	Adrian Matusil; Slovakia	Alexander Filatov; Russia
F46	Dmytro Ibragimov; Ukraine	Tomasz Rebisz; Poland	Nikita Prokhorov; Russia
F52/53	Che Jon Fernandes; Greece	Dmytro Balashev; Ukraine	Adrián Matušík; Slovakia
F54	Drazenko Mitrovic; Serbia	Georg Tischler; Austria	Manolis Stefanoudakis; Greece
F55	Ruzhdi Ruzhdi; Bulgaria	Ulrich Iser; Germany	Karol Kozum; Poland
F56/57/58	Alexey Ashapatov; Russia	Janusz Rokicki; Poland	Krzysztof Smorszczewski; Poland

== Results ==
=== F11 ===
Rank	Class	Athlete	1	2	3	4	5	6	Best	Notes
1st place, gold medalist(s)	F11	Vasyl Lishchynskyi; Ukraine	X	X	X	X	13.49	X	13.49	SB
2nd place, silver medalist(s)	F11	Bil Marinkovic; Austria	11.19	11.95	11.46	11.35	12.01	12.01	12.01	
3rd place, bronze medalist(s)	F11	Mirosław Madzia; Poland	10.23	9.88	10.62	10.66	10.06	11.81	11.81	SB
4	F11	Nelson Goncalves; Portugal	10.13	9.84	9.96	9.86	9.99	9.61	10.13	SB
5	F11	Dusko Sretentovic; Serbia	9.23	9.66	9.87	X	X	9.21	9.87	
6	F11	Denis Gulin; Russia	9.32	X	X	9.45	X	9.37	9.45	

=== F12 ===
Rank	Class	Athlete	1	2	3	4	5	6	Best	Notes
1st place, gold medalist(s)	F12	Andrii Holivets; Ukraine	14.91	14.33	15.72	15.04	X	15.26	15.72	
2nd place, silver medalist(s)	F12	Vladimir Andryushchenko; Russia	X	14.38	X	14.75	X	14.37	14.75	
3rd place, bronze medalist(s)	F12	Kim Lopez Gonzalez; Spain	13.90	X	13.65	13.51	X	X	13.90	SB
4	F12	Siarhei Hrybanau; Belarus	13.60	X	X	X	13.81	X	13.81	
5	F12	Sergei Shatalov; Russia	13.48	13.12	12.16	13.49	X	X	13.49	
6	F12	Rolandas Urbonas; Lithuania	13.16	12.85	13.09	X	13.05	X	13.16	SB
7	F12	Miljenko Vučić; Croatia	11.70	X	X	X	12.04	11.79	12.04	
8	F12	Héctor Cabrera; Spain	11.57	11.51	X	10.90	X	X	11.57	
9	F12	Albert van der Mee; Netherlands	10.01	9.73	11.22				11.22	
10	F12	Eduardo Sanca; Portugal	10.39	10.49	11.17				11.17	SB
11	F12	Mustafa Cakmak; Turkey	9.00	9.61	X				9.61	

=== F20 ===
Rank	Class	Athlete	1	2	3	4	5	6	Best	Notes
1st place, gold medalist(s)	F20	Jeffrey Ige; Sweden	13.02	X	13.02	13.41	13.35	13.50	13.50	
2nd place, silver medalist(s)	F20	Efstratios Nikolaidis; Greece	12.44	12.73	X	12.53	13.01	X	13.01	
3rd place, bronze medalist(s)	F20	Kostas Dibidis; Greece	X	12.17	11.21	12.50	12.53	X	12.53	
4	F20	Krzysztof Kaczmarek; Poland	11.82	11.97	X	11.62	12.44	12.32	12.44	
5	F20	Jüri Bergmann; Estonia	10.94	10.90	11.46	10.74	11.02	8.94	11.46	
6	F20	Daniel Storch; Germany	9.92	10.95	10.85	10.87	10.38	10.62	11.02	
7	F20	Oleg Shaydetskiy; Russia	10.97	10.34	10.40	10.38	10.38	10.62	10.97	SB
8	F20	Ricardo Marques; Portugal	10.77	X	X	10.81	X	X	10.81	
9	F20	Deniss Sedelnikov; Estonia	10.56	X	10.69				10.69	
10	F20	Damien Rumeau; France	10.33	X	X				10.33	
11	F20	Christos Trapezanidis; Greece	9.49	X	10.03				10.03	

=== F32/33/34 ===
Rank	Class	Athlete	1	2	3	4	5	6	Best	Points	Notes
1st place, gold medalist(s)	F34	Alexander El'Min; Russia	10.47	X	9.85	X	10.64	10.87	10.87	979	
2nd place, silver medalist(s)	F34	Darko Majdandzic; Croatia	9.58	X	9.20	9.24	X	9.40	9.58	782	
3rd place, bronze medalist(s)	F32	Maciej Sochal; Poland	7.25	X	6.52	7.23	X	X	7.25	719	
4	F32	Dimitrios Zisidis; Greece	X	6.61	7.22	X	X	X	7.22	715	
5	F32	Frantisek Serbus; Czech Republic	5.69	6.11	6.75	6.66	6.60	6.49	6.75	651	
6	F34	Raymond O'Dwyer; Ireland	8.37	8.63	8.11	8.34	8.14	8.37	8.63	628	
7	F32	Eoin Cleare; Ireland	6.23	X	X	6.20	X	X	6.23	573	
8	F33	David Lopez Belvis; Spain	X	6.86	X	6.40	X	X	6.86	558	

=== F37 ===
Rank	Class	Athlete	1	2	3	4	5	6	Best	Notes
1st place, gold medalist(s)	F37	Mindaugas Bilius; Lithuania	13.04	X	13.46	13.45	X	14.24	14.24	
2nd place, silver medalist(s)	F37	Mykola Zhabnyak; Ukraine	13.59	13.00	11.56	13.89	12.73	13.51	13.89	SB
3rd place, bronze medalist(s)	F37	Aleksei Lesnykh; Russia	13.37	13.43	13.58	13.75	X	X	13.75	
4	F37	Robert Chyra; Poland	11.42	X	10.79	12.02	X	X	12.02	SB
5	F37	Donatas Dundzys; Lithuania	11.20	10.82	X	11.80	10.30	X	11.80	SB
6	F37	Baldur Baldursson; Iceland	10.72	X	X	X	X	X	10.72	

=== F38 ===
Rank	Class	Athlete	1	2	3	4	5	6	Best	Notes
1st place, gold medalist(s)	F38	Oleksandr Doroshenko; Ukraine	14.76	X	13.40	14.38	14.68	15.12	15.12	
2nd place, silver medalist(s)	F38	Thomas Loosch; Germany	11.45	12.69	13.02	12.60	12.53	12.14	13.02	
3rd place, bronze medalist(s)	F38	Dusan Grezl; Czech Republic	12.42	13.00	12.83	12.14	X	X	13.00	
4	F38	Moussa Tambadou; France	12.70	X	12.54	12.92	12.11	X	12.92	SB
5	F38	Petr Vratil; Czech Republic	X	10.87	X	X	10.84	10.54	10.87	

=== F40 ===
Rank	Class	Athlete	1	2	3	4	5	6	Best	Notes
1st place, gold medalist(s)	F40	Paschalis Stathelakos; Greece	X	X	X	12.24	13.01	X	13.01	WR
2nd place, silver medalist(s)	F40	Alexandros Konstantinidis; Greece	10.96	11.01	11.51	10.29	11.09	11.48	11.51	SB
3	F40	Kyron Duke; United Kingdom	10.66	10.67	10.73	10.63	10.29	X	10.73	SB

=== F42 ===
Rank	Class	Athlete	1	2	3	4	5	6	Best	Notes
1st place, gold medalist(s)	F42	Frank Tinnemeier; Germany	13.13	12.85	11.92	13.26	13.11	12.65	13.26	
2nd place, silver medalist(s)	F42	Mladen Tomic; Croatia	11.91	11.68	12.40	12.57	12.65	12.52	12.65	SB
3rd place, bronze medalist(s)	F42	David Jonsson; Iceland	11.92	10.91	11.21	11.11	10.89	11.11	11.21	
4	F42	Dechko Ovcharov; Bulgaria	X	10.52	10.52	8.54	10.33	X	10.52	
5	F42	Marinos Fylachtos; Greece	7.95	8.00					8.00	

=== F44 ===
Rank	Class	Athlete	1	2	3	4	5	6	Best	Notes
1st place, gold medalist(s)	F44	Jackie Christiansen; Denmark	17.05	17.83	16.78	16.93	16.46	17.25	17.38	
2nd place, silver medalist(s)	F44	Adrian Matusik; Slovakia	13.82	X	14.79	14.84	15.77	15.96	15.96	SB
3rd place, bronze medalist(s)	F44	Alexander Filatov; Russia	13.99	X	14.85	15.02	14.71	14.77	15.02	SB
4	F44	Josip Slivar; Croatia	X	X	14.50	X	14.23	14.32	14.50	
5	F44	Zulkaid Skomorac; Bosnia and Herzegovina	12.93	12.86	13.35	12.94	12.91	12.81	13.35	

=== F46 ===
Rank	Class	Athlete	1	2	3	4	5	6	Best	Notes
1st place, gold medalist(s)	F46	Dmytro Ibragimov; Ukraine	X	14.23	15.46	15.07	14.85	15.20	15.46	WR
2nd place, silver medalist(s)	F46	Tomasz Rebisz; Poland	X	14.04	14.13	X	13.90	14.42	14.42	
3rd place, bronze medalist(s)	F46	Nikita Prokhorov; Russia	13.33	12.97	12.91	13.88	14.06	14.27	14.27	SB
4	F46	Mathias Schulze; Germany	13.70	13.06	13.48	14.14	X	X	14.14	SB

=== F52/53 ===
Rank	Class	Athlete	1	2	3	4	5	6	Best	Points	Notes
1st place, gold medalist(s)	F53	Che Jon Fernandes; Greece	X	7.70	7.74	7.82	X	7.53	7.82	785	SB
2nd place, silver medalist(s)	F53	Dmytro Balashev; Ukraine	7.80	X	7.42	7.45	7.72	X	7.80	781	SB
3rd place, bronze medalist(s)	F53	Gerasimos Vryonis; Greece	6.69	X	6.60	7.02	X	X	7.02	605	
4	F53	Ales Kisy; Czech Republic	6.96	6.91	6.90	X	6.78	6.89	6.96	591	
5	F53	Georgios Karaminas; Greece	X	X	6.99	X	X	X	6.99	415	

=== F54 ===
Rank	Class	Athlete	1	2	3	4	5	6	Best	Notes
1st place, gold medalist(s)	F54	Drazenko Mitrovic; Serbia	8.43	8.59	8.72	8.68	8.81	8.90	8.90	
2nd place, silver medalist(s)	F54	Georg Tischler; Austria	8.63	8.66	8.78	8.72	8.79	8.89	8.89	
3rd place, bronze medalist(s)	F54	Manolis Stefanoudakis; Greece	7.70	8.05	8.11	8.37	7.72	8.01	8.37	
4	F54	Jacob Dahl; Denmark	7.68	8.17	8.19	8.13	8.20	8.21	8.21	
5	F54	Milan Blaha; Czech Republic	8.02	7.94	7.91	7.65	7.95	7.98	8.02	
6	F54	Andreas Gratt; Austria	6.37	6.44	6.28	4.68	7.06	6.41	7.06	
—	F54	Germano Bernardi; Italy							DNS	

=== F55 ===
Rank	Class	Athlete	1	2	3	4	5	6	Best	Notes
1st place, gold medalist(s)	F55	Ruzhdi Ruzhdi; Bulgaria	10.02	10.97	9.23	9.93	8.61	10.07	10.97	SB
2nd place, silver medalist(s)	F55	Ulrich Iser; Germany	10.48	10.78	X	10.68	10.56	10.78	10.78	
3rd place, bronze medalist(s)	F55	Karol Kozun; Poland	10.36	10.41	10.21	10.70	10.49	10.39	10.70	
4	F55	Illias Nalmpantis; Greece	9.60	X	X	9.68	9.65	9.45	9.68	
5	F55	Mustafa Yuseinov; Bulgaria	9.43	X	9.59	9.47	9.56	9.59	9.59	SB
6	F55	Petar Milenkovic; Serbia	9.10	X	8.76	8.84	X	9.03	9.10	
7	F55	Georgi Kiryakov; Bulgaria	8.93	X	X	8.78	X	9.02	9.02	
8	F55	Slobodan Miletic; Serbia	8.83	X	8.95	X	8.99	X	8.99	
9	F55	Viktor Uridil; Czech Republic	8.22	8.10	7.75	7.83	8.03	8.03	8.22	
10	F55	Dusan Scambura; Czech Republic	7.63	7.88	7.75	8.07	X	X	8.07	
11	F55	Christian Benardi; San Marino	4.18	4.20	X	3.90	X	X	4.20	

=== F56/57/58 ===
Rank	Class	Athlete	1	2	3	4	5	6	Best	Points	Notes
1st place, gold medalist(s)	F58	Alexey Ashapatov; Russia	15.66	15.70	15.87	15.65	15.76	15.48	15.87	971	
2nd place, silver medalist(s)	F58	Janusz Rokicki; Poland	13.97	13.85	14.90	14.78	15.17	15.03	15.17	929	
3rd place, bronze medalist(s)	F56	Krzysztof Smorszczewski; Poland	11.45	11.77	11.91	11.81	11.95	12.11	12.11	926	SB
4	F56	Aleksi Kirjonen; Finland	X	10.78	11.23	11.60	X	12.00	12.00	918	SB
5	F57	Anastasios Tsiou; Greece	12.54	12.68	12.66	X	11.26	X	12.68	887	
6	F57	Angim Dimitrios Ntomgkioni; Greece	X	X	X	11.84	12.31	X	12.31	856	
7	F57	Boro Radenovic; Croatia	11.09	11.57	11.82	11.14	11.30	11.10	11.82	812	
8	F56	Adrian Vasko; Slovakia	9.73	9.89	9.84	9.53	10.05	X	10.05	738	SB
9	F57	James McCarthy; Ireland	X	10.91	X	9.88	X	9.84	10.01	616	

== See also ==
- List of IPC world records in athletics
