= 2014 IPC Athletics European Championships – Men's shot put =

The men's shot put at the 2014 IPC Athletics European Championships was held at the Swansea University Stadium from 18–23 August.

== Medalists ==
Event	Gold		Silver		Bronze	
F12	Kim Lopez Gonzalez; Spain	15.55	Vladimir Andriushchenko; Russia	15.18	Andrii Holivets; Ukraine	14.48
F20	Jeffrey Ige; Sweden	15.49	Alexander Alexandrov; Russia	14.00	Efstratios Nikolaidis; Greece	13.69
F32	Vladislav Frolov; Russia	9.02	Dimitrios Zisidis; Greece	7.61	Maciej Sochal; Poland	7.53
F33	Evgenii Malykh; Russia	11.88	Aleksandr Khrupin; Russia	11.15	Daniel Scheil; Germany	10.42
F34	Oleksandr Aliekseienko; Ukraine	7.67	Mateusz Wojnicki; Poland	7.56	Martin Dvorak; Czech Republic	7.05
F35	Alexander El'min; Russia	12.45	Tomasz Paulinski; Poland	12.42	Tymofii Kholodov; Ukraine	12.36
F36	Vladimir Sviridov; Russia	14.62	Sebastian Dietz; Germany	13.29	Pawel Piotrowski; Poland	13.16
F37	Mindaugas Bilius; Lithuania	15.15	Tomasz Blatkiewicz; Poland	13.58	Mykola Zhabnyak; Ukraine	13.45
F38	Oleksandr Doroshenko; Ukraine	14.43	Dusan Grezl; Czech Republic	12.38	Petr Vratil; Czech Republic	10.49
F41	Bartosz Tyszkowski (F41); Poland	12.83	Kyron Duke (F41); Great Britain	11.96	Dmitry Dushkin (F40); Russia	10.30
F42	Aled Davies; Great Britain	13.66	Frank Tinnemeier; Germany	12.51	Mladen Tomic; Croatia	12.20
F44	Adrian Matusik; Slovakia	16.19	Ivan Katanušić; Croatia	14.61	Josip Slivar; Croatia	14.57
F46	Dmytro Ibragimov; Ukraine	14.97	Nikita Prokhorov; Russia	14.95	Matthias Uwe Schulze; Germany	13.66
F53/54/55	Ruzhdi Ruzhdi (F55); Bulgaria	11.48; 974 pts	Drazenko Mitrovic (F54); Serbia	9.88; 962 pts	Karol Kozun (F55); Poland	11.03; 930 pts
F57	Alexey Ashapatov; Russia	13.81	Janusz Rokicki; Poland	13.37	Aleksi Kirjonen; Finland	12.57

== Results ==
=== F12 ===
Rank	Sport Class	Name	Nationality	Result	Notes
1st place, gold medalist(s)	F12	Kim Lopez Gonzalez	Spain	15.55	PB
2nd place, silver medalist(s)	F12	Vladimir Adriushchenko	Russia	15.18	
3rd place, bronze medalist(s)	F12	Andrii Holivets	Ukraine	14.48	
4	F12	Miljenko Vucic	Croatia	14.19	PB
5	F12	Sergei Shatalov	Russia	13.65	
6	F12	Eduardo Sanca	Portugal	12.09	
7	F11	Sergei Mikhalev	Russia	11.88	
8	F12	Rolandas Urbonas	Lithuania	11.72	SB
9	F11	Miroslaw Madzia	Poland	10.88	SB
10	F12	Petteri Peitso	Finland	10.67	SB
11	F12	Albert van der Mee	Netherlands	10.47	
12	F11	Vasyl Lishchynskyi	Ukraine	10.43	
13	F12	Marek Wietecki	Poland	10.24	
14	F11	Dusko Sretenovic	Serbia	9.98	
15	F11	Nelson Goncalves	Portugal	9.84	SB

=== F20 ===
Rank	Sport Class	Name	Nationality	Result	Notes
1st place, gold medalist(s)	F20	Jeffrey Ige	Sweden	15.49	
2nd place, silver medalist(s)	F20	Alexander Alexandrov	Russia	14.00	
3rd place, bronze medalist(s)	F20	Efstratios Nikolaidis	Greece	13.69	
4	F20	Ricardo Marques	Portugal	12.20	
5	F20	Jüri Bergmann	Estonia	11.18	
6	F20	Istvan Szollosi	Hungary	10.85	

=== F32 ===
Rank	Sport Class	Name	Nationality	Result	Notes
1st place, gold medalist(s)	F32	Vladislav Frolov	Russia	9.02	
2nd place, silver medalist(s)	F32	Dimitrios Zisidis	Greece	7.61	
3rd place, bronze medalist(s)	F32	Maciej Sochal	Poland	7.53	
—	F32	Antonino Puglisi	Italy	NM	

=== F33 ===
Rank	Sport Class	Name	Nationality	Result	Notes
1st place, gold medalist(s)	F33	Evgenii Malykh	Russia	11.88	
2nd place, silver medalist(s)	F33	Aleksandr Khrupin	Russia	11.15	
3rd place, bronze medalist(s)	F33	Daniel Scheil	Germany	10.42	PB
4	F33	Kieran Tscherniawsky	Great Britain	8.47	
5	F33	Ioannis Katranas	Greece	7.36	

=== F34 ===
Rank	Sport Class	Name	Nationality	Time	Notes
1st place, gold medalist(s)	F34	Oleksandr Aliekseienko	Ukraine	7.67	
2nd place, silver medalist(s)	F34	Mateusz Wojnicki	Poland	7.56	
3rd place, bronze medalist(s)	F34	Martin Dvorak	Czech Republic	7.05	SB
—	F34	Pavlos Tsiatas	Greece	NM	

=== F35 ===
Rank	Sport Class	Name	Nationality	Time	Notes
1st place, gold medalist(s)	F35	Alexander El'Min	Russia	12.45	
2nd place, silver medalist(s)	F35	Tomasz Paulinski	Poland	12.42	PB
3rd place, bronze medalist(s)	F35	Tymofii Kholodov	Ukraine	12.36	
4	F35	Jonathan Adams	Great Britain	11.71	
5	F35	Sam Ruddock	Great Britain	11.50	
6	F35	Edgards Bergs	Latvia	10.93	
7	F35	Michal Glab	Poland	9.95	
8	F35	Andreas Momtsos	Greece	9.77	

== See also ==
- List of IPC world records in athletics
