= 2014 IPC Athletics European Championships – Men's javelin throw =

The men's javelin throw at the 2014 IPC Athletics European Championships was held at the Swansea University Stadium from 18–23 August.

== Medalists ==
Event	Gold		Silver		Bronze	
F12	Hector Cabrera Llacer; Spain	56.20	Milos Grlica; Serbia	54.19	Marek Wietecki; Poland	51.39
F34	Daniel Scheil; Germany	26.75	Aleksandr Khrupin; Russia	21.66	Oleksandr Aliekseienko; Ukraine	20.64
F37/38	Dmitrijs Silovs (F37); Latvia	47.32; 938 pts	Oleksandr Doroshenko (F38); Ukraine	41.61; 861 pts	Petr Vratil (F38); Czech Republic	40.25; 824 pts
F41	Mathias Mester; Germany	38.69	Kyron Duke; Great Britain	36.70	Bartosz Tyszkowski; Poland	34.77
F42	Helgi Sveinsson; Iceland	50.74	Runar Steinstad; Norway	47.18	Dechko Ovcharov; Bulgaria	43.44
F44	Jonas Spudis; Lithuania	50.81	Maksym Solyankin; Ukraine	50.63	Patrick Stoll; Switzerland	44.82
F46	Nikita Prokhorov; Russia	45.24	Daniel Lisowski; Poland	42.98	Mathias Uwe Schulze; Germany	32.99
F54	Alexey Kuznetsov; Russia	27.03	Manolis Stefanoudakis; Greece	26.88	Drazenko Mitrovic; Serbia	25.57
F56	Aleksi Kirjonen (F56); Finland	31.12	Miloš Zarić (F55); Serbia	29.77	Mustafa Yuseinov (F55); Bulgaria	27.17
F57	Alexey Ashapatov; Russia	34.19	Allahverdi Allahverdiyev; Azerbaijan	32.49	Angim Dimitrios Ntomgkioni; Greece	31.87

== Results ==
=== F12 ===
Rank	Athlete	Best	Notes
1st place, gold medalist(s)	Hector Cabrera Llacer; Spain	56.20	
2nd place, silver medalist(s)	Milos Grlica; Serbia	54.19	
3rd place, bronze medalist(s)	Marek Wietecki; Poland	51.39	
4	Vitalii Telesh; Russia	44.31	
5	Roman Mesyk; Ukraine	43.43	
6	Salvador Cano Garcia; Spain	42.61	
7	Bil Marinkovic; Austria	41.66	
8	Nelson Goncalves; Portugal	31.91	
—	Milos Ranitovic; Montenegro	DNF	

=== F34 ===
Rank	Athlete	Best	Notes
1st place, gold medalist(s)	Daniel Scheil; Germany	26.75	
2nd place, silver medalist(s)	Aleksandr Khrupin; Russia	21.66	
3rd place, bronze medalist(s)	Oleksandr Aliekseienko; Ukraine	20.64	
4	Evgenii Malykh; Russia	19.65	
5	Mateusz Wojnicki; Poland	19.14	
6	Konstantinos Passas; Greece	16.69	
7	Ioannis Katranas; Greece	15.93	

=== F37/38 ===
Rank	Athlete	Best	Notes
1st place, gold medalist(s)	Dmitrijs Silovs; Latvia	47.32	
2nd place, silver medalist(s)	Oleksandr Doroshenko; Ukraine	41.61	
3rd place, bronze medalist(s)	Petr Vratil; Czech Republic	40.25	
4	Mykola Zhabnyak; Ukraine	41.94	
5	Joshua Bain; Great Britain	41.38	
6	Alexandr Lyashchenko; Russia	38.66	
7	Dusan Grezl; Czech Republic	36.13	
8	Martin Kukla; Czech Republic	35.76	
9	Lazaros Stefanidis; Greece	30.42	
10	Jiri Kohout; Czech Republic	29.39	

=== F41 ===
Rank	Athlete	Best	Notes
1st place, gold medalist(s)	Mathias Mester; Germany	38.69	
2nd place, silver medalist(s)	Kyron Duke; Great Britain	36.70	
3rd place, bronze medalist(s)	Bartosz Tyszkowski; Poland	34.77	
4	Marek Margoc; Slovakia	31.96	
5	Yan Shkulka; Russia	30.32	
6	Dmitry Dushkin; Russia	27.65	
7	Hakan Ayyildiz; Turkey	26.54	

=== F42 ===
Rank	Athlete	Best	Notes
1st place, gold medalist(s)	Helgi Sveinsson; Iceland	50.74	
2nd place, silver medalist(s)	Runar Steinstad; Norway	47.18	
3rd place, bronze medalist(s)	Dechko Ovcharoc; Bulgaria	43.44	
4	Mladen Tomic; Croatia	37.35	
5	Kenneth Hartmeyer; Denmark	28.03	

=== F44 ===
Rank	Athlete	Best	Notes
1st place, gold medalist(s)	Jonas Spudis; Lithuania	50.81	
2nd place, silver medalist(s)	Maksym Solyankin; Ukraine	50.63	
3rd place, bronze medalist(s)	Patrick Stoll; Switzerland	44.82	
4	Giacomo Poli; Italy	41.85	
5	Stephan Hem; Norway	38.26	
6	Egert Jõesaar; Estonia	35.02	

=== F46 ===
Rank	Athlete	Best	Notes
1st place, gold medalist(s)	Nikita Prokhorov; Russia	45.24	
2nd place, silver medalist(s)	Daniel Lisowski; Poland	42.98	
3rd place, bronze medalist(s)	Mathias Uwe Schulze; Germany	39.14	
4	Ciprian Baraian; Romania	38.40	
5	Hamza Dogan; Turkey	35.15	
6	Yogev Kenzi; Israel	24.90	

=== F54 ===
Rank	Athlete	Best	Notes
1st place, gold medalist(s)	Alexey Kuznetsov; Russia	27.03	
2nd place, silver medalist(s)	Manolis Stefanoudakis; Greece	26.88	
3rd place, bronze medalist(s)	Drazenko Mitrovic; Serbia	25.57	
4	Georg Tischler; Austria	22.04	
5	Danny Nobbs; Great Britain	21.24	
6	Athanasios Tsivilis; Greece	19.77	

=== F56 ===
Rank	Athlete	Best	Notes
1st place, gold medalist(s)	Aleksi Kirjonen; Finland	31.12	
2nd place, silver medalist(s)	Milos Zaric; Serbia	29.77	
3rd place, bronze medalist(s)	Mustafa Yuseinov; Bulgaria	27.17	
4	Ramunas Verbavicius; Lithuania	25.77	
5	Ruzhdi Ruzhdi; Bulgaria	24.77	
6	Zsolt Kanyo; Hungary	24.47	
7	Georgi Kiryakov; Bulgaria	24.44	
8	Karol Kozun; Poland	22.28	
—	Krzysztof Smorszczewski; Poland	DNS	

=== F57 ===
Rank	Athlete	Best	Notes
1st place, gold medalist(s)	Alexey Ashapatov; Russia	34.19	
2nd place, silver medalist(s)	Allahverdi Allahverdiyev; Azerbaijan	32.49	
3rd place, bronze medalist(s)	Angim Dimitrios Ntomgkioni; Greece	31.87	
4	Nathan Stephens; Great Britain	30.73	
5	Julius Hutka; Slovakia	28.06	
6	Musa Davulvu; Turkey	26.92	
7	Jaroslav Petrous; Czech Republic	26.88	

== See also ==
- List of IPC world records in athletics
