= 2012 IPC Athletics European Championships – Men's discus throw =

The men's shot put at the 2012 IPC Athletics European Championships was held at Stadskanaal Stadium from 24–29 July.

== Medalists ==
Results given by IPC Athletics.

Class	Gold	Silver	Bronze
F11	Vasyl Lishchynskyi; Ukraine	Bil Marinkovic; Austria	Miroslaw Madzia; Poland
F32/33/34	František Serbus; Czech Republic	Alexander El'min; Russia	Slaven Hudina; Croatia
F35/36	Pawel Piotrowski; Poland	Sebastian Dietz; Germany	Albin Vidović; Croatia
F37/38	Mindaugas Bilius; Lithuania	Mykola Zhabnyak; Ukraine	Oleksandr Doroshenko; Ukraine
F40/44	Alexandros Michail Konstantinidis; Greece	Paschalis Stathelakos; Greece	Adrian Matusik; Slovakia
F42	Dechko Ovcharov; Bulgaria	Marinos Fylachtos; Greece	Mohammad Al-Joburi; Sweden
F51/52/53	Miroslav Matic; Croatia	Joze Flere; Slovenia	Ales Kisy; Czech Republic
F54	Drazenko Mitrovic; Serbia	Alexey Kuznetsov; Russia	Jovica Brkic; Serbia
F55	Mustafa Yuseinov; Bulgaria	Slobodan Miletic; Serbia	Ruzhdi Ruzhdi; Bulgaria
F57/58	Derek Derenalagi; United Kingdom	Alexey Ashapatov; Russia	Jaroslav Petrous; Czech Republic

== Results ==
=== F11 ===
Rank	Class	Athlete	1	2	3	4	5	6	Best	Notes
1st place, gold medalist(s)	F11	Vasyl Lishchynskyi; Ukraine	37.36	X	34.50	34.01	X	X	37.36	
2nd place, silver medalist(s)	F11	Bil Marinkovic; Austria	X	30.97	33.03	X	32.90	X	33.03	
3rd place, bronze medalist(s)	F11	Miroslaw Madzia; Poland	30.70	29.91	X	30.08	X	X	30.70	
4	F11	Dusko Sretenovic; Serbia	28.73	X	X	X	27.11	X	28.73	
5	F11	Nelson Goncalves; Portugal	25.70	X	25.40	X	26.44	26.03	26.03	

=== F32/33/34 ===
Rank	Class	Athlete	1	2	3	4	5	6	Best	Points	Notes
1st place, gold medalist(s)	F32	František Serbus; Czech Republic	19.10	18.85	19.95	19.67	X	20.41	20.41	987	WR
2nd place, silver medalist(s)	F34	Alexander El'Min; Russia	34.30	36.00	31.72	38.24	X	25.58	38.24	906	ER
3rd place, bronze medalist(s)	F32	Slaven Hudina; Croatia	15.12	X	15.65	16.30	18.05	X	18.05	851	SB
4	F34	Raymond O'Dwyer; Ireland	X	28.12	26.19	28.01	29.34	X	29.34	619	
5	F33	David Lopez Belvis; Spain	X	9.29	X	10.80	X	8.43	10.80	159	

=== F35/36 ===
Rank	Class	Athlete	1	2	3	4	5	6	Best	Points	Notes
1st place, gold medalist(s)	F36	Pawel Piotrowski; Poland	X	X	38.13	37.02	X	36.62	38.13	991	
2nd place, silver medalist(s)	F36	Sebastian Dietz; Germany	37.32	37.21	X	33.06	35.48	35.47	37.32	970	
3rd place, bronze medalist(s)	F36	Albin Vidović; Croatia	32.35	X	30.03	X	32.77	35.87	35.87	931	
4	F36	Volodymyr Zhaivoronok; Ukraine	31.81	33.68	31.28	33.46	33.08	X	33.68	866	
5	F36	Oleksii Pashkov; Ukraine	26.78	X	X	X	32.60	X	32.60	831	SB
6	F35	Edgars Bergs; Latvia	41.44	43.03	X	X	44.30	X	44.30	793	SB
7	F35	Tomasz Pauliński; Poland	39.61	42.97	41.19	38.84	43.20	40.36	43.20	765	SB
8	F35	Michał Gląb; Poland	X	31.65	30.61	31.52	X	X	31.65	446	

=== F37/38 ===
Rank	Class	Athlete	1	2	3	4	5	6	Best	Points	Notes
1st place, gold medalist(s)	F37	Mindaugas Bilius; Lithuania	X	40.74	46.05	45.63	X	X	46.05	944	SB
2nd place, silver medalist(s)	F37	Mykola Zhabnyak; Ukraine	44.59	X	X	44.15	X	41.82	44.59	927	
3rd place, bronze medalist(s)	F38	Oleksandr Doroshenko; Ukraine	38.78	39.31	40.57	40.39	36.58	40.50	40.57	919	
4	F37	Ronni Jensen; Denmark	41.72	41.07	42.56	41.65	38.60	41.98	42.56	898	
5	F37	Robert Chyra; Poland	31.19	35.79	X	37.16	39.68	40.69	40.69	868	
6	F37	Timo Mustikkamaa; Finland	X	34.04	36.34	X	33.53	X	36.34	777	
7	F38	Dusan Grezl; Czech Republic	33.04	X	32.17	32.41	31.91	X	33.04	765	
8	F38	Petr Vratil; Czech Republic	32.08	X	X	X	X	31.29	32.08	738	

=== F40/44 ===
Rank	Class	Athlete	1	2	3	4	5	6	Best	Points	Notes
1st place, gold medalist(s)	F40	Alexandros Konstantinidis; Greece	33.25	33.95	34.23	34.19	X	36.08	36.08	897	
2nd place, silver medalist(s)	F40	Paschalis Stathelakos; Greece	34.96	X	X	X	35.89	X	35.89	891	
3rd place, bronze medalist(s)	F44	Adrian Matusik; Slovakia	47.66	51.52	X	X	X	50.67	51.52	849	
4	F44	Josip Slivar; Croatia	42.76	X	45.27	43.99	45.96	44.40	45.96	692	SB
5	F44	Alexander Filatov; Russia	44.53	41.61	44.23	43.09	44.86	45.12	45.12	663	

=== F42 ===
Rank	Class	Athlete	1	2	3	4	5	6	Best	Notes
1st place, gold medalist(s)	F42	Dechko Ovcharov; Bulgaria	X	35.50	38.11	X	40.08	35.79	40.08	
2nd place, silver medalist(s)	F42	Marinos Fylachtos; Greece	39.32	39.77	39.21	39.41	37.86	38.01	39.77	
3rd place, bronze medalist(s)	F42	Mohammad Al-Joburi; Sweden	38.60	37.42	38.83	35.50	38.44	X	38.83	
4	F42	Algirdas Tatulis; Lithuania	37.31	37.63	38.73	38.52	X	37.32	38.73	

=== F51/52/53 ===
Rank	Class	Athlete	1	2	3	4	5	6	Best	Points	Notes
1st place, gold medalist(s)	F51	Miroslav Matic; Croatia	X	7.63	X	9.33	X	7.70	9.93	585	
2nd place, silver medalist(s)	F51	Joze Flere; Slovenia	X	X	X	7.84	X	X	7.84	373	
3rd place, bronze medalist(s)	F53	Ales Kisy; Czech Republic	15.25	16.08	15.84	15.90	15.64	16.06	16.08	281	
4	F53	Dmytro Balashev; Ukraine	14.11	14.39	15.31	13.56	X	13.51	15.31	245	

=== F54 ===
Rank	Class	Athlete	1	2	3	4	5	6	Best	Notes
1st place, gold medalist(s)	F54	Drazenko Mitrovic; Serbia	25.23	29.69	30.95				30.95	
2nd place, silver medalist(s)	F54	Alexey Kuznetsov; Russia	24.53	X	X	27.09	29.45	X	29.45	
3rd place, bronze medalist(s)	F54	Jovica Brkic; Serbia	25.40	25.20	26.01	27.08	26.12	26.38	27.08	SB
4	F54	Germano Bernardi; Italy	23.57	X	23.60	24.10	X	22.31	24.10	SB
5	F54	Andreas Gratt; Austria	X	19.64	19.89	18.85	18.66	20.20	20.20	
6	F54	Deni Cerni; Croatia	X	18.06	18.22	X	17.90	19.52	19.52	

=== F55 ===
Rank	Class	Athlete	1	2	3	4	5	6	Best	Notes
1st place, gold medalist(s)	F55	Mustafa Yuseinov; Bulgaria	33.97	36.00	34.43	X	X	34.87	36.00	
2nd place, silver medalist(s)	F55	Slobodan Miletic; Serbia	26.94	28.71	30.57	31.89	31.78	30.47	31.89	SB
3rd place, bronze medalist(s)	F55	Ruzhdi Ruzhdi; Bulgaria	17.50	29.67	25.58	26.56	27.90	30.28	30.28	SB
4	F55	Ilias Nalmpantis; Greece	27.92	26.89	28.32	29.78	27.08	X	29.78	
5	F55	Viktor Uridil; Czech Republic	28.05	28.79	26.40	27.89	29.07	27.77	29.07	SB

=== F57/58 ===
Rank	Class	Athlete	1	2	3	4	5	6	Best	Points	Notes
1st place, gold medalist(s)	F57	Derek Derenalagi; United Kingdom	X	X	X	35.39	X	41.41	41.41	826	
2nd place, silver medalist(s)	F58	Alexey Ashapatov; Russia	33.02	35.42	37.61	41.36	33.72	46.85	46.85	795	
3rd place, bronze medalist(s)	F58	Jaroslav Petrous; Czech Republic	X	45.94	X	39.00	42.27	X	45.94	773	
4	F57	Ali Ghardooni; Germany	35.00	35.45	37.71	37.76	36.39	37.71	37.76	725	
5	F58	Janusz Rokicki; Poland	X	37.84	38.55	43.09	X	X	43.09	703	
6	F57	Boro Radenovic; Croatia	X	X	28.65	X	27.61	30.99	30.99	511	

== See also ==
- List of IPC world records in athletics
