= 2013 IPC Athletics World Championships – Men's shot put =

The men's shot put at the 2013 IPC Athletics World Championships was held at the Stade du Rhône from 20 to 29 July.

== Medalists ==
Class	Gold	Silver	Bronze
F11	David Casinos; Spain	Vasyl Lishchynskyi; Ukraine	Sergei Mikhalev; Russia
F12	Andrii Holivets; Ukraine	Vladimir Andryushchenko; Russia	Sergei Shatalov; Russia
F20	Muhammad Ziyad Zolkefli; Malaysia	Jeffrey Ige; Sweden	Todd Hodgetts; Australia
F32/33	Kamel Kardjena; Algeria	Karim Betina; Algeria	Mounir Bakiri; Algeria
F34	Scott Jones; United Kingdom	Alexander El'min; Russia	Mohsen Kaedi; Iran
F35	Tomasz Paulinski; Poland	Alexis Jose Paez; Venezuela	Michal Glab; Poland
F36	Vladimir Sviridov; Russia	Sebastian Dietz; Germany	Pawel Piotrowski; Poland
F37	Xia Dong; China	Mindaugas Bilius; Lithuania	Mykola Zhabnyak; Ukraine
F38	Oleksandr Doroshenko; Ukraine	Moussa Tambadou; France	Dusan Grezl; Czech Republic
F41	Bartosz Tyszkowski; Poland	Jonathan de Souza Santos; Brazil	Kyron Duke; United Kingdom
F42	Aled Davies; United Kingdom	Frank Tinnemeier; Germany	Darko Kralj; Croatia
F44	Jackie Christiansen; Denmark	Adrian Matusik; Slovakia	Josip Slivar; Croatia
F46	Nikita Prokhorov; Russia	Dmytro Ibragimov; Ukraine	Matthias Schulze; Germany
F52/53	Aigars Apinis; Latvia	Scot Severn; United States	Che Jon Fernandes; Greece
F54/55	Karol Kozun; Poland	Georg Tischler; Austria	Scott Winkler; United States
F56/57	Mohamad Mohamad; Syria	Jamil Elshebli; Jordan	Aleksi Kirjonen; Finland
F58	Alexey Ashapatov; Russia	Janusz Rokicki; Poland	Leonardo Amancio; Brazil

== See also ==
- List of IPC world records in athletics
