= Athletics at the 2008 Summer Paralympics – Men's shot put F55–56 =

Men's Shot Put F55/56 at the XIII Paralympic Games
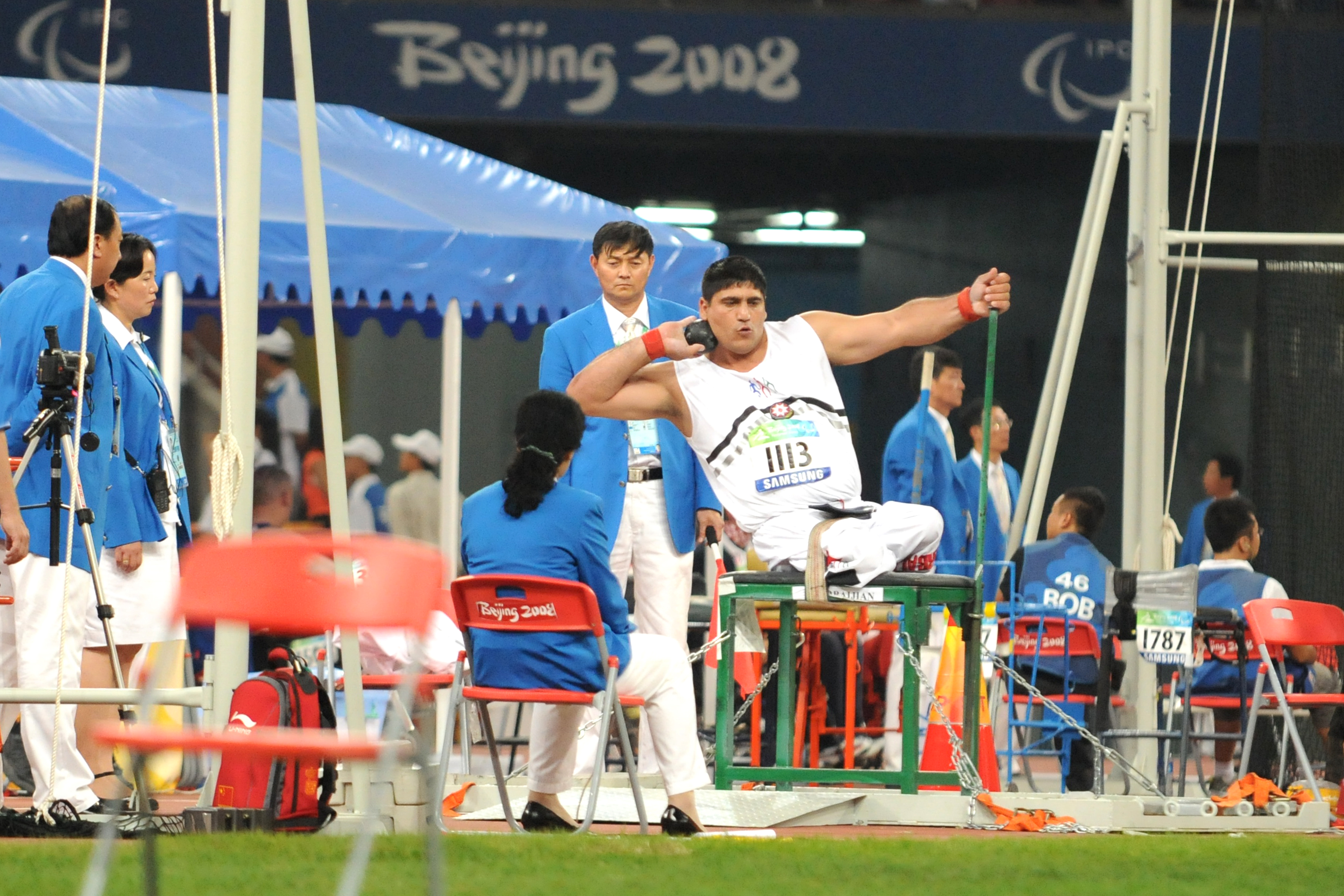
- Olokhan Musayev from Azerbaijan, gold medalist
- Venue: Beijing National Stadium
- Dates: 15 September
- Competitors: 17 from 15 nations
- Winning distance: 13.49

Medalists
1st place, gold medalist(s)		Olokhan Musayev	Azerbaijan
2nd place, silver medalist(s)		Krzysztof Smorszczewski	Poland
3rd place, bronze medalist(s)		Martin Němec	Czech Republic

The men's shot put F55/56 event at the 2008 Summer Paralympics took place at the Beijing National Stadium at 17:00 on 15 September. There was a single round of competition; after the first three throws, only the top eight had 3 further throws. The competition was won by Olokhan Musayev, representing Azerbaijan.

== Results ==
Rank	Athlete	Nationality	Cl.	1	2	3	4	5	6	Best	Pts.	Notes
1st place, gold medalist(s)	Olokhan Musayev	Azerbaijan	F56	13.32	13.49	11.04	12.82	12.11	12.08	13.49	1162	WR
2nd place, silver medalist(s)	Krzysztof Smorszczewski	Poland	F56	11.95	11.75	11.74	11.31	11.62	11.82	11.95	1030	
3rd place, bronze medalist(s)	Martin Němec	Czech Republic	F55	10.71	10.99	11.38	10.91	11.07	11.55	11.55	1020	PR
4	Alexey Ivanov	Russia	F56	11.68	11.49	11.75	11.48	11.70	11.52	11.75	1012	SB
5	Scott Winkler	United States	F55	11.27	11.11	11.05	10.69	10.72	x	11.27	995	SB
6	Mohamed Roshdy Beshta	Egypt	F56	11.35	10.45	11.32	11.07	x	x	11.35	978	SB
7	Pieter Gruijters	Netherlands	F56	10.97	11.20	11.27	10.85	11.33	10.97	11.33	976	
8	Ilias Nalmpantis	Greece	F55	10.74	10.82	10.99	10.93	x	10.81	10.99	971	SB
9	Ulrich Iser	Germany	F55	10.64	10.81	10.77	-	-	-	10.81	955	
10	Adrian Vasko	Slovakia	F56	10.35	10.85	10.88	-	-	-	10.88	938	SB
11	Enrique Sanchez	Mexico	F56	x	10.57	10.43	-	-	-	10.57	911	SB
12	Jalil Bagherijedi	Iran	F55	9.99	5.64	9.75	-	-	-	9.99	882	
13	Karol Kozun	Poland	F55	9.15	9.89	9.79	-	-	-	9.89	873	
14	Leonardo Diaz	Cuba	F56	10.10	10.04	9.90	-	-	-	10.10	870	SB
15	Dzevad Pandzic	Bosnia and Herzegovina	F55	8.59	8.82	9.02	-	-	-	9.02	797	
16	Erick Figueredo	Cuba	F55	8.11	8.07	7.92	-	-	-	8.11	716	
17	Justine Ernest	Tanzania	F56	6.57	6.82	6.88	-	-	-	6.88	593	

WR = World Record. PR = Paralympic Record. SB = Seasonal Best.
