= 2013 IPC Athletics World Championships – Men's discus throw =

The men's discus throw at the 2013 IPC Athletics World Championships was held at the Stade du Rhône from 20 to 29 July.

== Medalists ==
Class	Gold	Silver	Bronze
F11	David Casinos Sierra; Spain	Sergio Paz; Argentina	Vasyl Lishchynskyi; Ukraine
F12	Kim Lopez Gonzalez; Spain	Vladimir Andryushchenko; Russia	Branimir Budetić; Croatia
F32/33/34	Lahouari Bahlaz; Algeria	Wang Yanzhang; China	Hani Alnakhli; Saudi Arabia
F35/36	Sebastian Dietz; Germany	Georgios Vagiannopoulos; Greece	Volodymyr Zhaivoronok; Ukraine
F37/38	Mykola Zhabnyak; Ukraine	Xia Dong; China	Guy Henly; Australia
F41	Jonathan de Souza Santos; Brazil	N/A	N/A
F42	Aled Davies; United Kingdom	Marinos Fylachtos; Greece	Dechko Ovcharov; Bulgaria
F44	Jeremy Campbell; United States	Dan Greaves; United Kingdom	Adrián Matušik; Slovakia
F46	Nikita Prokhorov; Russia	Dmytro Ibragimov; Ukraine	Tomasz Rebisz; Poland
F51/52/53	Mohamed Berrahal; Algeria	Mohamed Zemzemi; Tunisia	Aigars Apinis; Latvia
F54/55/56	Leonardo Diaz; Cuba	Drazenko Mitrovic; Serbia	Mustafa Yuseinov; Bulgaria
F57/58	Alexey Ashapatov; Russia	Samir Nabiyev; Azerbaijan	Claudiney Santos; Brazil

== See also ==
- List of IPC world records in athletics
