= Christian Bernardi =

Christian Bernardi is the name of two people:

- Christian Bernardi (athlete) (born 1970), Sammarinese athlete
- Christian Bernardi (footballer) (born 1990), Argentine footballer
