= Andrii Holivets =

Paralympic athlete of Ukraine

Personal information
- Nationality: Ukrainian
- Born: 22 February 1972 (age 54)

Sport
- Country: Ukraine
- Sport: Paralympic athletics
- Disability class: F12
- Event: Throwing events
Medal record
Event	1st	2nd	3rd
Paralympic Games	1	0	0
World Championships	1	0	0
European Championships	1	0	1
Paralympic athletics
Representing Ukraine
Paralympic Games
Gold medal – first place	2012 London	Shot put – F11/12
IPC Athletics World Championships
Gold medal – first place	2013 Lyon	Shot put F12
IPC European Championships
Gold medal – first place	2012 Stadskanaal	Shot put - F12
Bronze medal – third place	2014 Swansea	Shot put - F12

Andrii Holivets (born 22 February 1972) is a Paralympian athlete from Ukraine competing mainly in category F11/12 throwing events.

In 2012, Holivets entered the European Championships in Stadskanaal in the Netherlands. There he competed in the F12 shot put, recording a distance of 15.52m which gave him his first major gold medal. Holivets competed in his first Paralympic Games at London in 2012. He competed in the shot put, in the joint F11/F12 event. He threw a distance of 16.25m, converting to 991 points, enough to beat his nearest rival, Russia's Vladimir Andryushchenko into second place.

At the 2013 IPC Athletics World Championships, Holivets again took the gold medal, and for the third time in last three major competitions he left Andryushchenko in silver medal position.
