= Athletics at the 2008 Summer Paralympics – Men's shot put F11–12 =

The Men's Shot Put F11-12 had its Final held on September 16 at 17:15.

== Medalists ==
| Gold | David Casinos; Spain |
| Silver | Vladimir Andryushchenko; Russia |
| Bronze | Vasyl Lishchynskyi; Ukraine |

== Results ==
| Place | Athlete | Class | 1 | 2 | 3 | 4 | 5 | 6 | Best | Points |
|---|---|---|---|---|---|---|---|---|---|---|
| 1 | David Casino (ESP) | F11 | 13.83 | 14.50 | 14.05 | x | x | 14.02 | 14.50 | 1050 |
| 2 | Vladimir Andryushchenko (RUS) | F12 | x | 15.48 | 14.55 | 16.46 | 15.96 | 15.27 | 16.46 | 1015 |
| 3 | Vasyl Lishchynskyi (UKR) | F11 | x | 11.00 | 13.59 | 13.41 | 12.94 | 13.04 | 13.59 | 984 |
| 4 | Siarhei Hrybanau (BLR) | F12 | 14.28 | 13.98 | 14.21 | 15.35 | 14.84 | 14.14 | 15.35 | 947 |
| 5 | Yury Buchkou (BLR) | F12 | 14.82 | 14.98 | 14.07 | 13.61 | x | 13.60 | 14.98 | 924 |
| 6 | Russell Short (AUS) | F12 | 14.09 | 14.27 | 14.79 | 14.12 | 14.21 | x | 14.79 | 912 |
| 7 | Rolandas Urbonas (LTU) | F12 | 14.72 | 14.30 | x | x | 13.09 | 14.30 | 14.72 | 908 |
| 8 | Sebastian Baldassarri (ARG) | F11 | 10.93 | 10.44 | 10.47 | 11.11 | 10.85 | 9.79 | 11.11 | 804 |
