= Paschalis Stathelakos =

Greek Paralympic athlete (born 1991)

Personal information
- Nationality: Greek
- Born: 24 February 1991 (age 35)

Sport
- Country: Greece
- Sport: Paralympic athletics
- Disability class: F40
- Event: Throwing events
Medal record
Event	1st	2nd	3rd
Paralympic Games	1	1	1
World Championships	0	1	0
European Championships	0	2	0
Paralympic athletics
Representing Greece
Paralympic Games
Gold medal – first place	2008 Beijing	Shot Put – F40
Silver medal – second place	2012 London	Discus throw – F40
Bronze medal – third place	2012 London	Shot put – F40
IPC Athletics World Championships
Silver medal – second place	2011 Christchurch	Shot put F40
IPC European Championships
Silver medal – second place	2012 Stadskanaal	Shot put – F40/44
Silver medal – second place	2012 Stadskanaal	Discus – F40/44

Paschalis Stathelakos, (Greek: Πασχάλης Σταθελάκος) (born 24 February 1991) is a Paralympian athlete from Greece competing mainly in category F40 shot put events.

He competed in the 2008 Summer Paralympics in Beijing, China. There he won a gold medal in the men's F40 shot put event.

He was awarded as the Best Greek male athlete with a disability for 2011.
