= Athletics at the 2016 Summer Paralympics – Men's shot put F11–12 =

In the 2016 Summer Paralympics in Rio, the men's shotput F12 competition took place on 8 September. Kim Lopez Gonzalez of Spain took the gold medal with a throw of 16.44 meters.
