= Efstratios Nikolaidis =

Greek Paralympic athlete (born 1985)

Personal information
- Nationality: Greek
- Born: 19 September 1985 (age 40) Thessaloniki, Greece

Sport
- Sport: Paralympic athletics
- Disability class: F20
- Event: shot put
Medal record
Men's para-athletics
Representing Greece
Paralympic Games
Bronze medal – third place	2020 Tokyo	shot put F20
World Championships
Silver medal – second place	2011 Christchurch	shot put F20
Bronze medal – third place	2019 Dubai	shot put F20
European Championships
Silver medal – second place	2012 Stadskanaal	shot put F20
Silver medal – second place	2016 Grosseto	shot put F20
Bronze medal – third place	2014 Swansea	shot put F20
Bronze medal – third place	2018 Berlin	shot put F20
Bronze medal – third place	2021 Bydgoszcz	shot put F20

Efstratios Nikolaidis (born 19 September 1985) is a Greek Paralympic athlete who specializes in shot put. He represented Greece at the Paralympic Games.

== Career ==
Nikolaidis represented Greece at the 2012 Summer Paralympics where he finished in fourth place in the men's shot put F20 event with a personal best of 14.51 metres. He again competed at the 2016 Summer Paralympics where he finished in fourth place in the men's shot put F20 event with a personal best of 15.69 metres. He competed in the shot put F20 event at the 2020 Summer Paralympics and won a bronze medal with a distance of 15.93 metres.
