= San Marino at the Paralympics =

- Flag of San Marino
- IPC code: SMR
- NPC: Comitato Paralimpico Sammarinese
- Medals: Gold 0 Silver 0 Bronze 0 Total 0

Summer appearances
- 2012; 2016–2024

San Marino has participated in one edition of the Paralympic Games, debuting at the 2012 Games in London.

== See also ==
- San Marino at the Olympics
- San Marino at the European Games
- San Marino at the Mediterranean Games
