= San Marino at the 2012 Summer Paralympics =

- IPC code: SMR
- NPC: San Marino Paralympic Committee

in London
- Competitors: 1 in 1 sport
- Medals: Gold 0 Silver 0 Bronze 0 Total 0

Summer Paralympics appearances (overview)
- 2012; 2016–2024

San Marino made its Paralympic Games début at the 2012 Summer Paralympics in London, United Kingdom, from 29 August to 9 September.

The country was represented by a single athlete, Christian Bernardi, in the shot put, F55 disability category (wheelchair athlete). Bernardi did not qualify for the Games, but received a wildcard invitation so that San Marino could be represented. He did not win a medal.

== Athletics ==
In his single event, the shot put, Bernardi finished 19th and last, with a throw of 4.54 metres, significantly behind the other competitors.

Men's Field Events

Athlete	Event	Distance	Points	Rank
Christian Bernardi	Shot Put F54-56	4.54 m	68	19

== See also ==
- Summer Paralympic disability classification
- San Marino at the Paralympics
- San Marino at the 2012 Summer Olympics
