= Bartosz Tyszkowski =

Polish Paralympic athlete

Personal information
- Born: 25 January 1994 (age 32)

Sport
- Country: Poland
- Sport: Para-athletics
- Disability: Short stature
- Disability class: F41
- Events: Javelin throw; Shot put
Medal record
Paralympic Games
Silver medal – second place	2016 Rio de Janeiro	Shot put F41
World Championships
Gold medal – first place	2013 Lyon	Shot put F41
Gold medal – first place	2015 Doha	Shot put F41
European Championships
Gold medal – first place	2014 Swansea	Shot put F41
Bronze medal – third place	2014 Swansea	Javelin throw F41
Gold medal – first place	2016 Grosseto	Shot put F40/F41
Bronze medal – third place	2016 Grosseto	Javelin throw F40/F41
Gold medal – first place	2018 Berlin	Shot put F41

Bartosz Tyszkowski (born 25 January 1994) is a Polish Paralympic athlete and he competes in F41-classification javelin throw and shot put events. He represented Poland at the 2012 Summer Paralympics in London, United Kingdom and at the 2016 Summer Paralympics in Rio de Janeiro, Brazil. At the 2016 Summer Paralympics, he won the silver medal in the men's shot put F41 event.

He won the gold medal in the men's shot put F41 event at the IPC Athletics World Championships both in 2013 and in 2015.

At the 2018 World Para Athletics European Championships in Berlin, Germany, he won the gold medal in the men's shot put F41 event and he also set a new world record of 14.04m.
