= Sebastian Dietz =

German Paralympic athlete (born 1985)

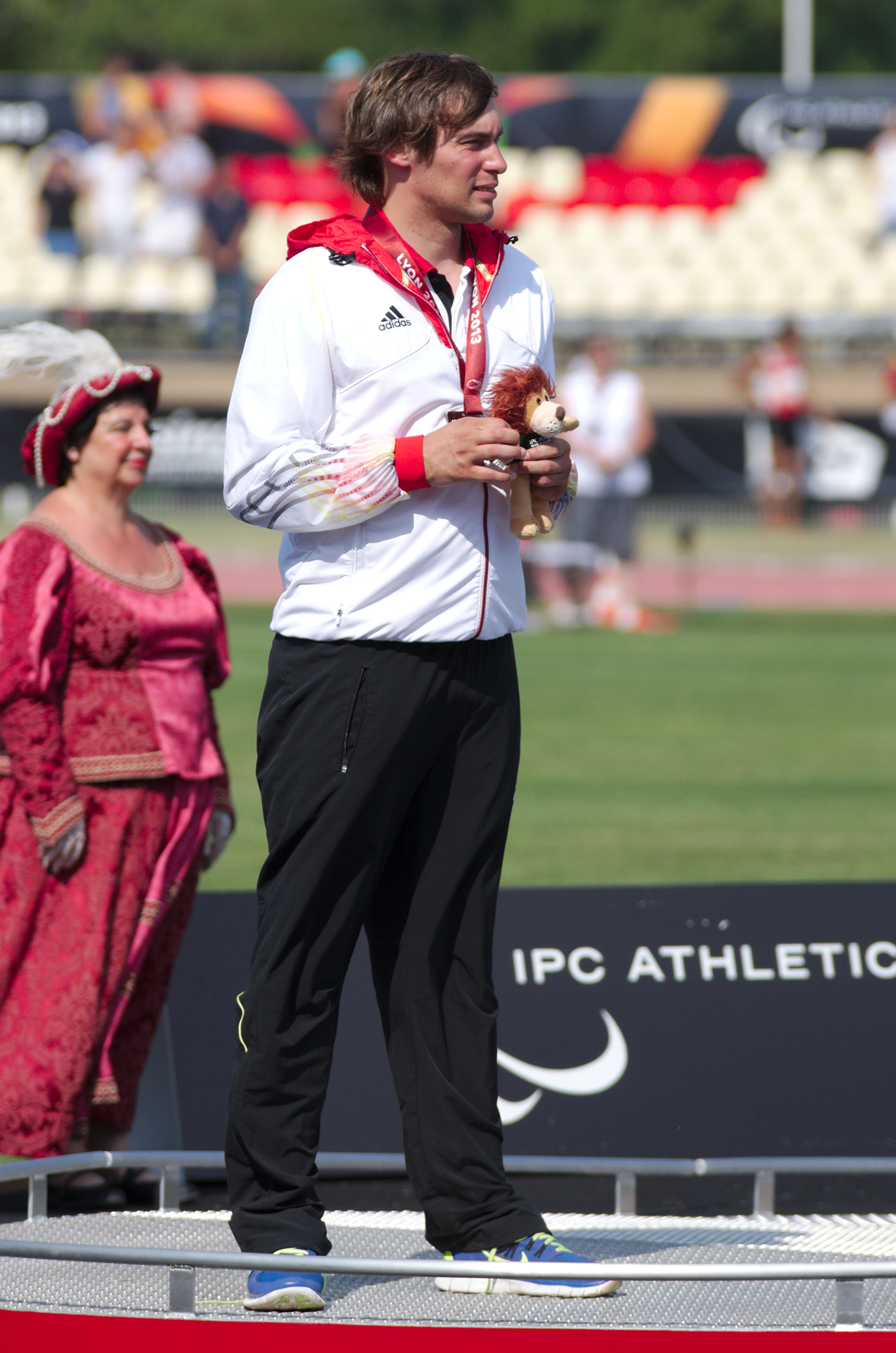
- Dietz receiving his silver medal at the 2013 World Championships in Lyon.

Personal information
- Full name: Sebastian Ernst Klaus Dietz
- Nationality: German
- Born: 25 February 1985 (age 41) Worms, Germany
- Height: 184 cm (72 in)

Sport
- Country: Germany
- Sport: Athletics
- Disability: Acquired
- Disability class: F36
- Club: BSG Bad Oeynhausen
- Coached by: Willi Gernemann (national); Alexander Holstein (personal)
Medal record
Men's para-athletics
Representing Germany
Paralympic Games
Gold medal – first place	2012 London	Discus – F35/36
Bronze medal – third place	2020 Tokyo	Shot put – F36
IPC World Championships
Gold medal – first place	2013 Lyon	Discus – F35/36
Gold medal – first place	2015 Doha	Shot put – F36
Silver medal – second place	2013 Lyon	Shot put – F36
IPC European Championships
Silver medal – second place	2014 Swansea	Shot put – F36
Silver medal – second place	2016 Grosseto	Shot put – F36

Sebastian Ernst Klaus Dietz (born 25 February 1985) is a German track and field athlete who competes in disability athletics in the F36 category. Dietz specializes in both the discus and shot put, winning a gold medal in the former at the 2012 Summer Paralympics in London. As well as achieving Paralympic success Dietz has also won gold in his classification in both discus and shot put at the IPC World Championships.
