= Lindsay Sutton =

Australian Paralympic athlete

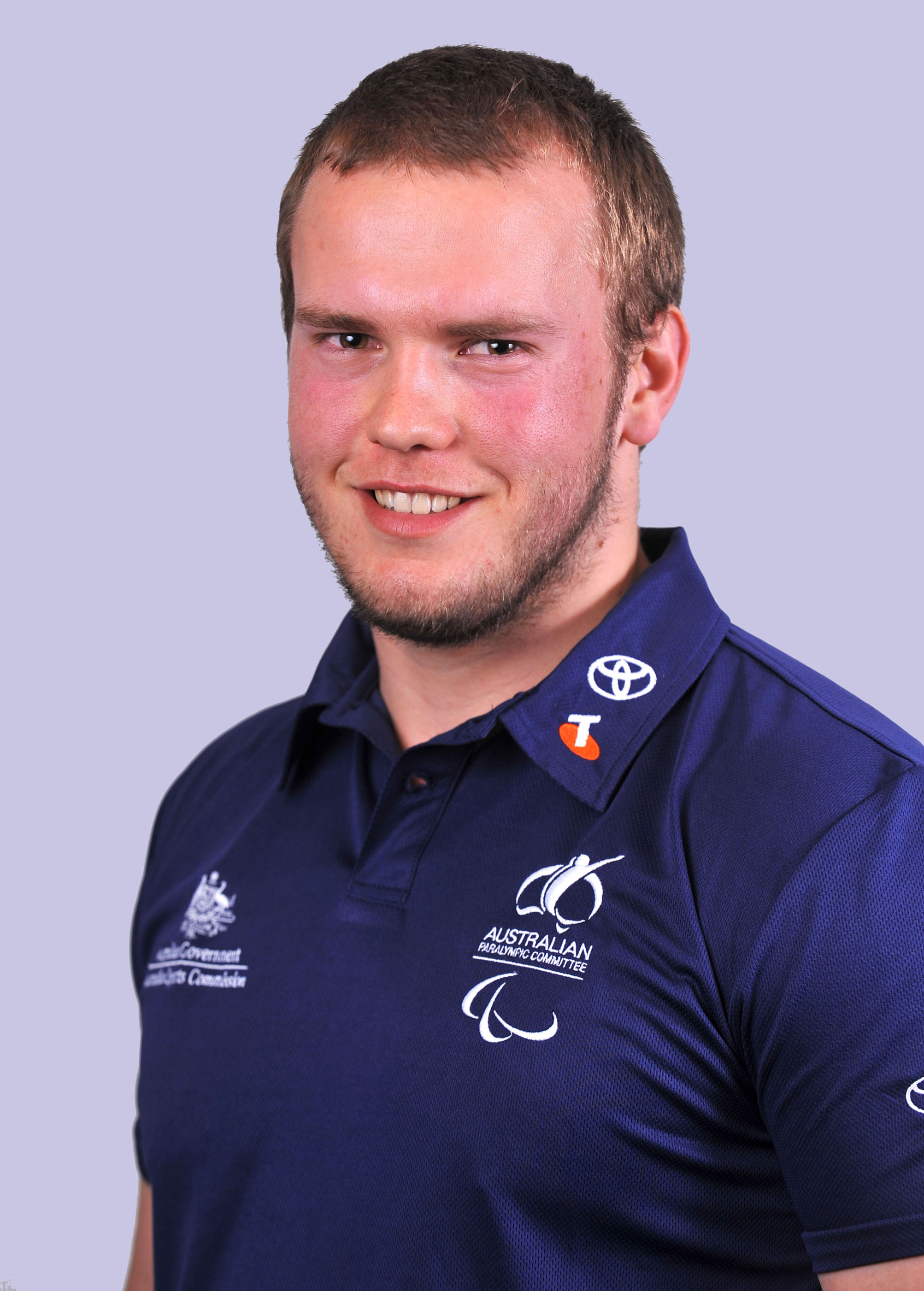
- 2012 Australian Paralympic team portrait of Sutton

Personal information
- Nationality: Australian
- Born: 23 October 1989 (age 37)

Sport
- Country: Australia
- Sport: Athletics
- Events: Shot put Discus; Hammer throw

Lindsay Sutton (born 23 October 1989) is an Australian track and field athlete who represented Australia at the 2012 Summer Paralympics in athletics.

== Personal ==
Sutton is from the Sunshine Coast region of Queensland. He attended Beerwah State High School. He was awarded the 2004 Caloundra City Australia Day Junior Sports Award. In 2007 and 2012, he lived in Mount Mellum. In 2009, he had a part-time job working at Suncoast Fitness. He was also working on earning a certificate three in fitness.

== Athletics ==
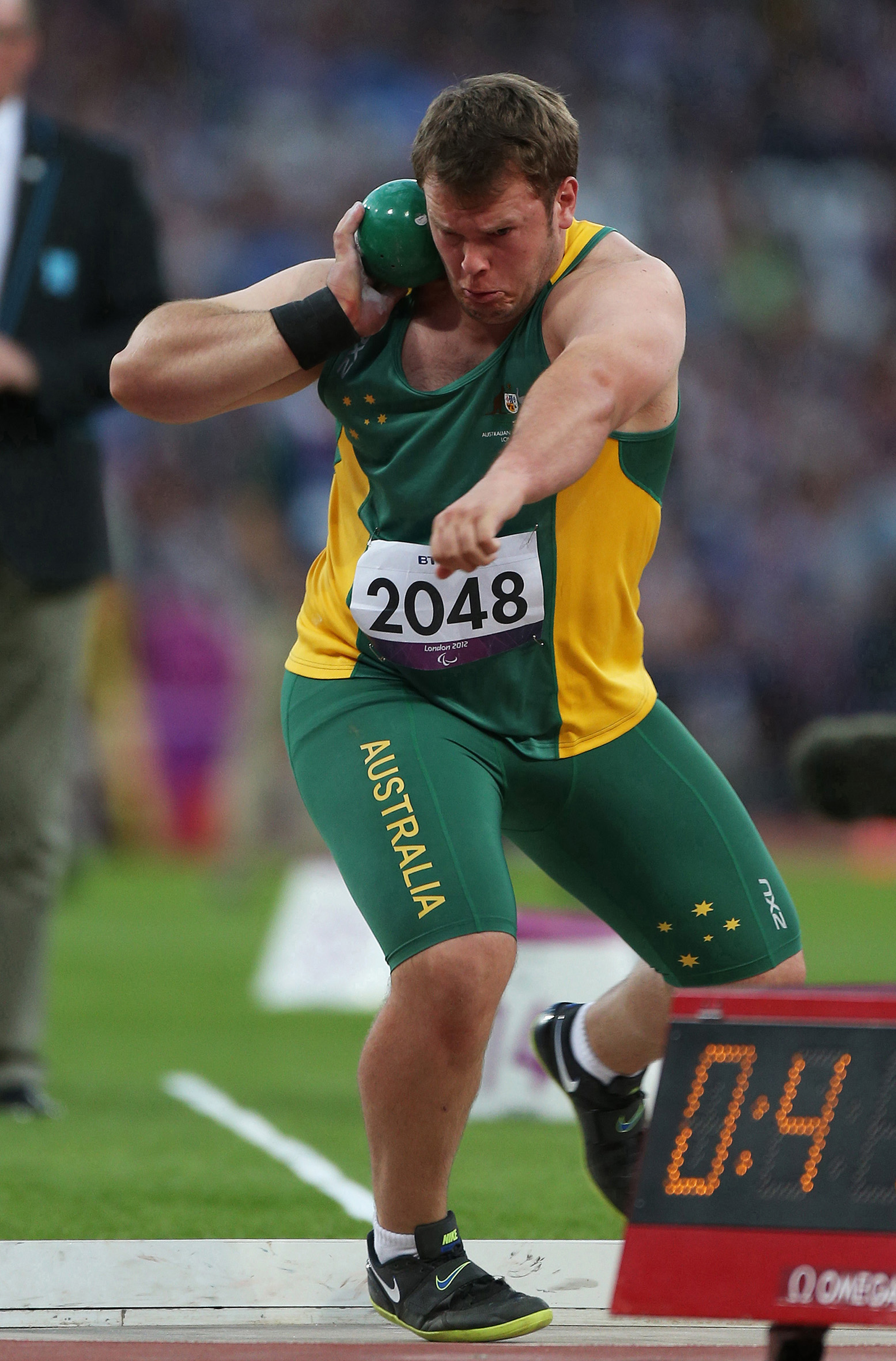
Sutton at the 2012 London Paralympics

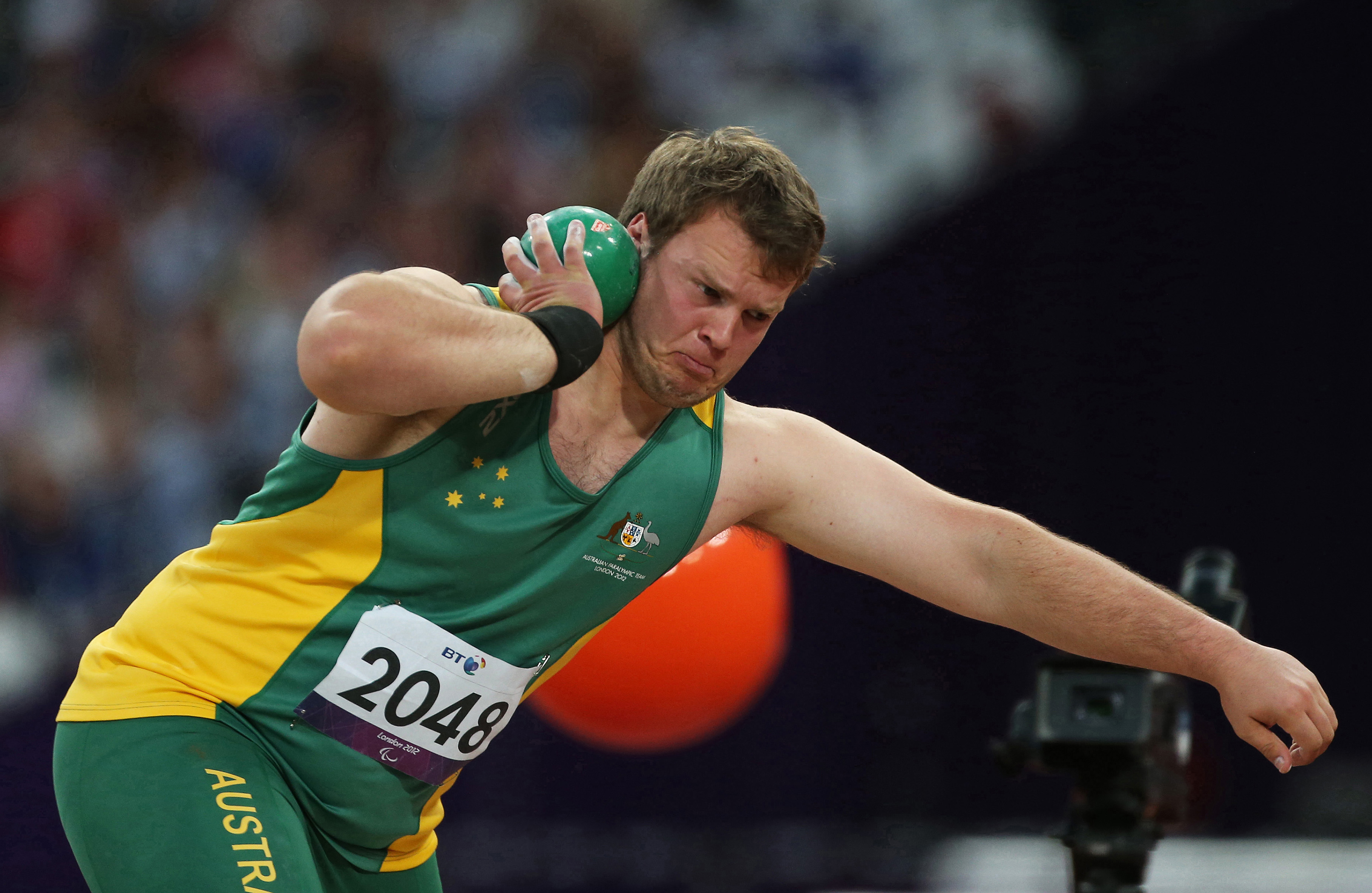
Sutton at the 2012 London Paralympics

Sutton has an intellectual disability, competing in the F20 class. He is coached by Ian Fenwick. and has held an athletics scholarship with the Queensland Academy of Sport. He set Queensland intellectual disability records in under-14 shot put, under-16 discus and under-16 javelin.

In 2005, Sutton participated in the Australian national championships. In 2006, he participated in the University of Queensland Winter Invitation Meet. In March 2007, he participated in the Australian athletics championships, where he set a world record with a throw of 38.40m. In early 2007 in Gold Coast, Queensland, he threw the hammer 43 plus metres at a practice that did not allow the distance to be counted for the world record. In October 2007, at the 6th INAS-FID World Athletics Championships in Fortaleza, Brazil, he set a world record in the hammer throw of 42.39 metres on his second throw. At the same competition, he set a personal best distance of 10.37 metres in the shot put event to finish ninth in the event. He was supposed to participate in the javelin throw, but following a 41.65 metre first throw, he withdrew from the event because of an injury to his right elbow. Despite the injury, he competed in the discus the day after the javelin event where he threw a personal best of 32.61 metres. In 2009, he finished first in the men's discus at the AWD Australia Athletics Championships. At the 2009 Global Games, he won a gold medal in the hammer throw. In the process, he set two world records in the event. He finished third in the discus event and fourth in the shot put.

At the 2011 Global Games, he won a pair of gold medals, including one in the hammer throw where he set a world record with a throw of 47.44 metres. He was selected to represent Australia at the 2012 Summer Paralympics in athletics.

At the 2012 London Paralympics, he finished sixth in the Men's Shot Put F20 with a best throw of 13.04m. Competing at the 2013 IPC Athletics World Championships in Lyon, he finished ninth in the Men's Shot Put with 12.28m. At the 2015 IPC Athletics World Championships in Doha he finished eighth with 13.10m. The event was won by fellow Australian Todd Hodgetts.
