= Mindaugas Bilius =

Lithuanian Paralympic athlete (born 1982)

Personal information
- Born: 13 February 1982 (age 44)

Sport
- Country: Lithuania
- Sport: Para-athletics
- Disability: Cerebral palsy
- Disability class: F37
- Events: Discus throw; Shot put
Medal record
Paralympic Games
Gold medal – first place	2016 Rio de Janeiro	Shot put F37
Silver medal – second place	2016 Rio de Janeiro	Discus throw F37
World Championships
Gold medal – first place	2017 London	Shot put F37
Silver medal – second place	2015 Doha	Shot put F37
Silver medal – second place	2013 Lyon	Shot put F37
European Championships
Gold medal – first place	2016 Grosseto	Discus throw F37
Gold medal – first place	2016 Grosseto	Shot put F37
Gold medal – first place	2014 Swansea	Shot put F37
Gold medal – first place	2012 Stadskanaal	Discus throw F37/F38
Gold medal – first place	2012 Stadskanaal	Shot put F37
Silver medal – second place	2014 Swansea	Discus throw F37/F38

Mindaugas Bilius (born 13 February 1982) is a Lithuanian Paralympic athlete with cerebral palsy.

== Career ==
He represented Lithuania at the 2012 Summer Paralympics and at the 2016 Summer Paralympics and he won two medals, both in 2016: the gold medal in the men's shot put F37 event and the silver medal in the men's discus throw F37 event.

At the 2017 World Championships he won the gold medal in the men's shot put F37 event.
