= Jeffrey Ige =

Swedish Paralympic athlete

Personal information
- Nationality: Swedish
- Born: 29 November 1983 (age 42) Stockholm, Sweden
- Height: 199 cm (6 ft 6 in)

Sport
- Country: Sweden
- Sport: Para athletics
- Disability class: T20
- Event: Shot put
- Club: Huddinge AIS
- Coached by: Hans Almstrom (club); Magnus Olsson (national)
Medal record
Para athletics
Representing Sweden
Paralympic Games
Silver medal – second place	2012 London	Shot put - T20
IPC World Championships
Gold medal – first place	2011 Christchurch	Shot put - T20
Silver medal – second place	2013 Lyon	Shot put - T20
IPC European Championships
Gold medal – first place	2014 Swansea	Shot put - T20
Bronze medal – third place	2016 Grosseto	Shot put - T20

Jeffrey Ige (born 29 November 1983) is a Paralympic athlete from Sweden who competes in T20 classification shot put events. Ige represented Sweden at the 2012 Summer Paralympics in London, where he won the silver medal in the shot put. As well as Paralympic success, Ige has won both the World and European Championship titles in his sport, in 2011 and 2014 respectively.
