= Jonathan de Souza Santos =

Brazilian Paralympic athlete

Personal information
- Nickname: Romarinho
- Born: 19 March 1990 (age 36) Maceió, Brazil
- Height: 141 cm (4 ft 8 in)

Sport
- Country: Brazil
- Sport: Para athletics
- Disability class: F41, F40
- Event(s): Shot put Discus throw
- Club: Associacao Atletica Rosinha Santos
- Coached by: Walquiria da Silva Campelo
Medal record
Men's para athletics
Representing Brazil
Paralympic Games
Bronze medal – third place	2012 London	Discus – F40
World Championships
Silver medal – second place	2011 Christchurch	Discus – F40
Gold medal – first place	2013 Lyon	Discus – F41
Silver medal – second place	2013 Lyon	Shot put – F41
Bronze medal – third place	2015 Doha	Shot put – F41

Jonathan de Souza Santos (born 19 May 1990) is a Paralympian athlete from Brazil competing mainly in F41 classification throwing events.

== Athletics career ==
De Souza Santos first represented his country at a Paralympic Games in 2008 in Beijing, entering the F40 shot put event. His best throw of 10.53 saw him finish outside the medals in fifth place. Success was to follow at the 2012 Summer Paralympics in London, where he won his first Paralympic medal; a bronze in the F40 discus throw, recording a distance of 40.49 metres. As well as his Paralympic success, de Souza Santos won a silver in the discus at the 2011 IPC Athletics World Championships in Christchurch. After the London Games the International Paralympic Committee redefined the F40 classification, splitting it into two categories for athletes of short stature, and de Souza Santos was reclassified as a F41 athlete. As an F41 competitor he has achieved further success winning gold at the 2013 World Championships in Lyon, along with a silver in the shot put. He added a further shot put bronze medal two years later in Doha.

== Personal history ==
De Souza Santos was born in Maceió, Brazil in 1990.
