= Tomasz Rebisz =

Polish Paralympic athlete

Personal information
- Born: 2 February 1974 (age 52) Koszalin, Poland
- Height: 185 cm (73 in)

Sport
- Country: Poland
- Sport: Athletics
- Disability class: F46
- Event(s): shot put discus throw javelin throw
- Club: START Koszalin
- Coached by: Alexander Poplawski (club); Zbigniew Lewkowicz (national)
Medal record
Track and field
Representing Poland
Paralympic Games
Silver medal – second place	1996 Atlanta	Shot put – F46
Silver medal – second place	1996 Atlanta	Discus – F46
Bronze medal – third place	1996 Atlanta	Javelin – F46
Bronze medal – third place	2012 London	Shot put – F46
IPC World Championships
Gold medal – first place	1998 Birmingham	Shot put – F46
Gold medal – first place	2011 Christchurch	Discus – F46
Bronze medal – third place	2013 Lyon	Discus – F46
Silver medal – second place	1998 Birmingham	Discus – F46
Bronze medal – third place	1998 Birmingham	Javelin – F46

Tomasz Rebisz (born 2 February 1974) is a Paralympian athlete from Poland competing mainly in F46 classification throwing events. The decision by the International Paralympic Committee to remove his classification form the Paralympic programme between 1998 and 2010 meant Rebisz had a gap of 16 years between winning medals at the 1996 Summer Paralympics in Atlanta and the 2012 Summer Paralympics in London.

== Athletics history ==
Rebisz was always interested in sport but took up athletics seriously in 1992. He was selected for the Poland national team at the 1996 Summer Paralympics in Atlanta, entering the shot put, javelin and discus throw events in the F46 classification. He won medals in all three, silver in the discus and shot put and bronze in the javelin. He followed this with three more medals at the 1998 IPC Athletics World Championships in Birmingham, including gold in the shot put. The International Paralympic Committee then decided to remove all F46 throwing event from their Paralympic schedule, leaving Rebisz unable to compete at the highest level of his sport.

In the run-up to the 2012 Summer Paralympics in London the IPC chose to reinstate the F46 classification to their programme. Rebisz felt cheated by the original decision to remove the T46 category and when discussing the reintroduction he stated that "I felt like someone had done it to annoy me,". He entered the 2011 IPC Athletics World Championships in Christchurch, competing in the shot and discus. He came sixth in the shot put, but won gold in the discus. At London, he entered the only event available to him, the shot put, as his favoured discus event was not contested in the F46. He recorded a season's best of 15.01 metres, which was enough to win Rebisz a bronze, his first Paralympic medal in 16 years.

== Personal history ==
Rebisz was born in Koszalin, Poland in 1974. He has a daughter.
