= Oleksandr Doroshenko =

Ukrainian Paralympic athlete (born 1981)

Personal information
- Nationality: Ukrainian
- Born: 1 September 1981 (age 44) Voroshylovhrad, Voroshylovhrad Oblast, Ukrainian SSR (now Ukraine)

Sport
- Country: Ukraine
- Sport: Paralympic athletics
- Disability class: F38
- Event: Throwing events
Medal record
| Event | 1st | 2nd | 3rd |
|---|---|---|---|
| Paralympic Games | 2 | 0 | 1 |
| World Championships | 3 | 2 | 0 |
| European Championships | 2 | 1 | 1 |
Paralympic athletics
Representing Ukraine
Paralympic Games
| Gold medal – first place | 2004 Athens | Shot put - F38 |
| Gold medal – first place | 2004 Athens | Discus - F38 |
| Bronze medal – third place | 2004 Athens | Javelin - F36/38 |
IPC Athletics World Championships
| Gold medal – first place | 2002 Lille | Shot put F38 |
| Silver medal – second place | 2011 Christchurch | Shot put F38 |
| Gold medal – first place | 2013 Lyon | Shot put F38 |
| Gold medal – first place | 2015 Doha | Shot put F38 |
| Silver medal – second place | 2015 Doha | Javelin F38 |
IPC European Championships
| Gold medal – first place | 2012 Stadskanaal | Shot put - F38 |
| Gold medal – first place | 2014 Swansea | Shot put - F38 |
| Silver medal – second place | 2014 Swansea | Javelin - F37/38 |
| Bronze medal – third place | 2012 Stadskanaal | Discus - F37/38 |

Oleksandr Volodymyrovych Doroshenko (Ukrainian: Олександр Володимирович Дорошенко; born 1 September 1981) is a Paralympian athlete from Ukraine competing mainly in category F38 throwing events.

Olexandr competed in the 2004 Summer Paralympics winning gold in both the F38 shot put and discus and a bronze in the combined F36/38 javelin.

Two-time Paralympic champion Oleksandr Doroshenko (javelin thrower) took fourth place of the 2024 Summer Paralympics with a result of 51.85 meters.
