= Alexandros Konstantinidis =

Greek footballer

Personal information
- Date of birth: 3 November 1988 (age 38)
- Place of birth: Dortmund, West Germany
- Height: 1.78 m (5 ft 10 in)
- Position: Midfielder

Youth career
- 2000–2004: Borussia Dortmund
- 2004–2007: Panathinaikos

Senior career*
| Years | Team | Apps | (Gls) |
| 2007–2008 | Panathinaikos | 1 | (0) |
| 2007–2008 | → Koropi (loan) | 21 | (0) |
| 2008–2009 | Apollon Smyrnis | 19 | (1) |
| 2009–2010 | Panserraikos | | |
| 2010–2011 | Agios Dimitrios | | |
| 2011–2012 | Iraklis | | |

International career
| 2008–2009 | Greece U21 | 11 | (2) |
- * Club domestic league appearances and goals

Alexandros Konstantinidis (Greek: Αλέξανδρος Κωνσταντινίδης; born 3 November 1988) is a Greek former professional footballer who played as a midfielder.

== Club career ==
Konstantinidis began his career with Panathinaikos and played in season 2007/2008 on loan for Koropi F.C. He turned back in July 2008 to Panathinaikos and played for the team until June 2008, before signed in August for Apollon Smyrnis After one year with Apollon Smyrnis was in summer 2009 released and signed after a difficult trial with Ruch Chorzow, for Panserraikos who scored his first goal for his new team on 15 November 2009.

== International career ==
Konstantinidis is former member of the Greece national under-21 football team.
