= Ulrich Iser =

German Paralympic athlete

Personal information
- Nationality: German
- Born: 14 April 1957 (age 69)

Sport
- Country: Germany
- Sport: Paralympic athletics
- Disability class: F55
- Event: Throwing events
Medal record
Event	1st	2nd	3rd
Paralympic Games	0	0	1
World Championships	0	0	0
European Championships	0	1	0
Paralympic athletics
Representing Germany
Paralympic Games
Bronze medal – third place	2000 Sydney	Shot put - F55
IPC European Championships
Silver medal – second place	2012 Stadskanaal	Shot put - F55

Ulrich Iser (born 14 April 1957) is a paralympic athlete from Germany competing mainly in category F55 throws events.

Iser has competed at three Paralympics. In 2000 and 2004 he competed in all three throws winning the bronze medal in the shot put in 2000. He also competed in the shot put in Beijing in the 2008 Summer Paralympics.
