= Xia Dong =

Chinese Paralympic athlete

Personal information
- Born: 6 June 1984 (age 42)

Sport
- Sport: Paralympic athletics
Medal record
Paralympic athletics
Representing China
Paralympic Games
Gold medal – first place	2008 Beijing	Shot put F37/38
Gold medal – first place	2008 Beijing	Discus throw F37/38
Gold medal – first place	2012 London	Shot put F37/38
Silver medal – second place	2008 Beijing	Javelin throw F37/38
Silver medal – second place	2012 London	Discus throw F37/38
Silver medal – second place	2016 Rio de Janeiro	Shot put F37
Bronze medal – third place	2016 Rio de Janeiro	Discus throw F37
World Championships
Gold medal – first place	2006 Assen	Javelin throw F37
Gold medal – first place	2013 Lyon	Shot put F37
Gold medal – first place	2015 Doha	Shot put F37
Silver medal – second place	2006 Assen	Shot put F37
Silver medal – second place	2013 Lyon	Discus F37/38
Bronze medal – third place	2015 Doha	Javelin F37
Asian Para Games
Gold medal – first place	2014 Incheon	Shot put F37
Silver medal – second place	2014 Incheon	Discus throw F37

Xia Dong (Chinese: 夏东; pinyin: Xià Dōng; born June 6, 1984) is a Paralympic athlete from China. He competes in throwing events in the F37 classification.

He competed at the 2008 Summer Paralympics in Beijing winning the gold medals in the F37/38 class javelin and shot put and the bronze medal in the class F37/38 discus throw. At the 2012 Summer Paralympics in London, he won a silver medal in the F37/38 discus event. In the F37/38 shot put, he won a gold medal with a world record breaking throw.
