= Jonathan Adams (athlete) =

British Paralympic shot putter

Personal information
- Nationality: British
- Born: 11 September 1992 (age 33) Bury St Edmunds, Suffolk

Sport
- Country: United Kingdom
- Sport: Athletics
- Disability: Cerebral palsy
- Disability class: F35
- Event: Shot put
- Club: Ipswich Harriers

Achievements and titles
- Paralympic finals: London 2012
- Personal best: 12.79m

Jonathan Robert Adams (born 11 September 1992) is a Track and field athlete competing in the Shot Put in the F35 classification for athletes with cerebral palsy. Adams qualified to represent the Great Britain team at the 2012 Summer Paralympics, competing in the F34 shot put placing 14th in the final.

Jonathan despite reaching qualification standards was not selected to compete at 2016 Summer Paralympics in the F35 Shot Put.

== Life history ==
Adams was born in Bury St Edmunds, Suffolk, England in 1992, to Robert and Sharon Adams. He is the younger sibling to sister Ayesha. Adams was born 9 1/2 weeks premature and spent his early life requiring medical support before being diagnosed with Quadriplegic cerebral palsy.

Adams who also has a visual impairment attended a mainstream school. During his early years Adams had several operations at West Suffolk Hospital in Bury St Edmunds to help improve his disability both with his cerebral palsy and Visual Impairments. Due to the severity of his conditions much of his life was spent in a wheelchair or with walking orthotics. From 2006 to 2009 Adams underwent life changing surgical reconstruction of his left leg in London at the Royal London Hospital in Whitechapel.

== Athletics career ==
He became involved in sport while in primary school after he took part in the Norfolk Youth Games. A student at Loughborough College, by 2009 Adams was entering youth competitions in the shot put and discus, recording a personal best in the shot of 9.84m in September. In 2010 Adams improved on both his shot put and discus records 10.59m and 36.27m respectively.

In April 2011, Adams was selected for the IWAS World Junior Championships, held in Dubai. Adams underwent reclassification following multiple surgeries from 2006 to 2009 which meant the athlete had to compete seated.

Following reclassification to an F34 from his previous F35 classification, he won silver in both the discus and shot put in his inaugural competition as an F34 athlete That year he also entered competed on the IWAS European Series winning titles in Germany in 2011 and medals in the Netherlands.

In 2012 he was selected to represent the Great Britain team in the 2012 Summer Paralympics in the F34 shot put event, following his success at the BT Paralympic World Cup and Paralympic test event. Before the start of the Paralympics, Adams confessed that he did not expect to win a medal, but would use the London 2012 games as a spring board to achieving success in the 2016 Games in Rio.

Adams was reclassified in May 2014 following advice from the sports governing body and was classified in Nottwill (Switzerland) at the IPC Grand Prix. During this event competing as an F35 Jonathan set a new British record of 12.62m and placed third in his first international meeting since the 2012 London Paralympic Games. In August 2014 Adams was selected to compete in the 2014 IPC Athletics European Championships in Swansea (Wales). Adams finished 4th in the Men's F35 Shot Put and achieved a career high World Ranking of third.

In 2015 Adams suffered a severe injury to his right patella tendon following the failure of a carbon fibre walking orthotic. Due to subsequent issues Adams was removed from the governing body infrastructure and has been competing without any financial or sponsorship since the 2014 season.
