= Nikita Prokhorov =

Russian Paralympic athlete

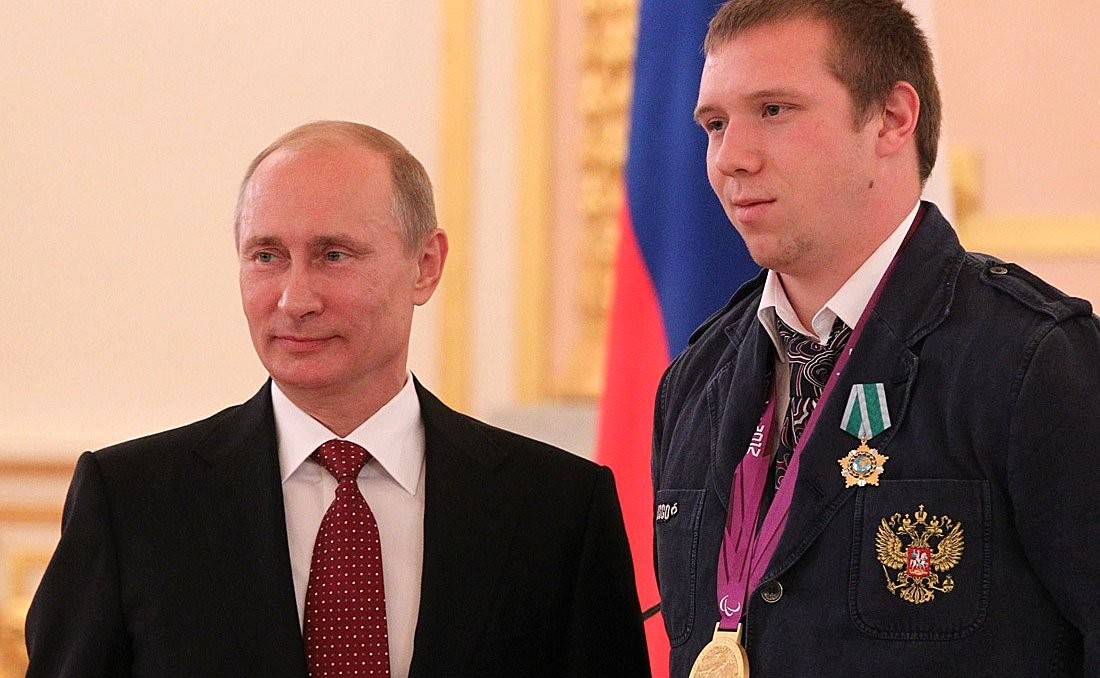
- Vladimir Putin and Nikita Prokhorov in 2012

Personal information
- Nationality: Russian
- Born: Nikita Prokhorov; 10 January 1991 (age 35)

Sport
- Country: Russia
- Sport: Athletics
- Disability class: F46
- Club: Avangard

Achievements and titles
- Paralympic finals: London 2012
Medal record
Paralympic Games
Gold medal – first place	2012 London	Shot put F46
IPC Athletics World Championships
Gold medal – first place	2013 Lyon	Shot put F46
Gold medal – first place	2013 Lyon	Discus F46
Gold medal – first place	2015 Doha	Shot put F46
IPC Athletics European Championships
Gold medal – first place	2014 Swansea	Javelin F46
Silver medal – second place	2014 Swansea	Discus F46
Silver medal – second place	2014 Swansea	Shot put F46
Bronze medal – third place	2012 Stadskanaal	Shot put F46
- Updated on 20 August 2014

Nikita Prokhorov (born 10 January 1991) is a Russian athlete who competes in disability athletics in the F46 category. He won the gold medal for the shot put at the 2012 Paralympic Games for his category with a new World Record. At the 2013 World Championships Prokhorov broke his own World record in the shot put as he won gold in the F46 class. In the discus throw, Prokhorov set a new championship record when winning gold in the F46 class.
