= Vasyl Lishchynskyi =

Ukrainian Paralympic athlete (1964–2015)

Vasyl Lischynskyi
Personal information
- Nationality: Ukrainian
- Born: 18 March 1964
- Died: 29 November 2015 (aged 51)

Sport
- Country: Ukraine
- Sport: Paralympic athletics
- Disability class: F11/12
- Event: Throwing events
Medal record
Event	1st	2nd	3rd
Paralympic Games	2	2	1
World Championships	0	1	1
European Championships	2	0	1
Paralympic athletics
Representing Ukraine
Paralympic Games
Gold medal – first place	1996 Atlanta	Shot put – F11
Gold medal – first place	2008 Beijing	Discus throw – F11/12
Silver medal – second place	1996 Atlanta	Discus throw – F11
Silver medal – second place	2012 London	Discus throw – F11
Bronze medal – third place	2008 Beijing	Shot put – F11/12
IPC Athletics World Championships
Gold medal – first place	2002 Villeneuve d'Ascq	Discus – F11
Silver medal – second place	2011 Christchurch	Shot put F11
Silver medal – second place	2011 Christchurch	Discus – F11
Silver medal – second place	2013 Lyon	Shot put F11
Bronze medal – third place	2006 Assen	Discus – F11
Bronze medal – third place	2013 Lyon	Discus F11
IPC European Championships
Gold medal – first place	2012 Stadskanaal	Shot put – F11
Gold medal – first place	2012 Stadskanaal	Discus – F11
Bronze medal – third place	2014 Swansea	Discus – F11

Vasyl Lischynskyi (Ukrainian: Василь Вікторович Ліщинський; 18 March 1964 – 29 November 2015) was a Paralympian athlete from Ukraine competing mainly in category F11/12 throwing events.

== Biography ==
Vasyl competed in four Paralympics, always competing in the shot and discus. His first games were in 1996 where he won gold in the shot and silver in the discus. 2000 and 2004 proved barren games but in the 2008 Summer Paralympics in Beijing, China he won a gold medal in the F11/12 discus and a bronze in the F11/12 shot put.
