= Moussa Tambadou =

French Paralympic athlete

Personal information
- Born: 25 August 1992 (age 33) Paris, France
- Height: 1.84 m (6 ft 0 in)

Sport
- Country: France
- Sport: Paralympic athletics
- Disability: Hemiplegia
- Disability class: T38
- Event: Long jump
Medal record
Paralympic athletics
Representing France
World Championships
Silver medal – second place	2013 Lyon	Men's shot put F38
European Championships
Silver medal – second place	2016 Grosseto	Men's long jump T38
Bronze medal – third place	2014 Swansea	Men's long jump T38
Bronze medal – third place	2018 Berlin	Men's long jump T37

Moussa Tambadou (born 25 August 1992) is a French Paralympic athlete who competes in long jump at international elite events, he is also a former shot putter. He is a World silver medalist in shot put and a three-time European medalist in long jump.
