= Christian Bernardi (athlete) =

Sammarinese athlete (born 1970)

Christian Bernardi (born 15 August 1970 in San Marino) is a Sammarinese athlete.

He is a wheelchair athlete, who has competed as an amateur in handbike marathons in Venice, Rome, Berlin and New York, and who also practices wheelchair tennis and the shot put. He was selected, through a wild card invitation, to be San Marino's sole representative for the country's first ever participation at the Paralympic Games. At the 2012 Summer Paralympics in London, he competed in the shot put, in the men's F54-56 disability category (for wheelchair athletes). He finished in 19th place.
