= Georg Tischler =

Austrian Paralympic athlete

Personal information
- Nationality: Austrian
- Born: 11 September 1961 (age 64)

Sport
- Country: Austria
- Sport: Paralympic athletics
- Disability class: F54
- Event: Throwing events
Medal record
| Event | 1st | 2nd | 3rd |
|---|---|---|---|
| Paralympic Games | 1 | 0 | 0 |
| World Championships | 0 | 1 | 0 |
| European Championships | 0 | 1 | 0 |
Paralympic athletics
Representing Austria
Paralympic Games
| Gold medal – first place | 2004 Athens | Shot Put – F54 |
IPC Athletics World Championships
| Silver medal – second place | 2013 Lyon | Shot put F54/55 |
IPC Athletics European Championships
| Silver medal – second place | 2012 Stadskanaal | Shot put – F54 |

Georg Tischler (born 11 September 1961) is a Paralympic athlete from Austria competing in seated throwing events. He is classified F54.

Tischler set the F54 World Record for shot put in 2009.

He has competed at four consecutive Paralympics starting in 2000 and has always competed in the shot put and discus as well as the javelin in 2000. His only medal so far came in Athens in 2004 where he won gold in the F54 shot put. He reached the finals but did not medal at the 2012 Summer Paralympics in London.
