= Alexey Ashapatov =

Russian Paralympic athlete

- Aleksey Ashspatov in 2012

Personal information
- Nationality: Russian
- Born: 30 October 1973 (age 52) Saratov, Russia
- Height: 2.02 m (6 ft 8 in)
- Weight: 117 kg (258 lb)

Sport
- Country: Russia
- Sport: Paralympic athletics
- Disability class: F57
- Event: Throwing events
Medal record
Event	1st	2nd	3rd
Paralympic Games	4	0	0
World Championships	4	1	0
European Championships	3	2	1
Paralympic athletics
Representing Russia
Paralympic Games
Gold medal – first place	2008 Beijing	Shot put F57–58
Gold medal – first place	2008 Beijing	Discus F57–58
Gold medal – first place	2012 London	Discus F57–58
Gold medal – first place	2012 London	Shot put F57–58
IPC Athletics World Championships
Gold medal – first place	2011 Christchurch	Shot put F57/58
Gold medal – first place	2011 Christchurch	Discus F57/58
Gold medal – first place	2013 Lyon	Shot put F57/58
Gold medal – first place	2013 Lyon	Discus F57/58
Silver medal – second place	2015 Doha	Shot put F57/58
IPC Athletics European Championships
Gold medal – first place	2012 Stadskanaal	Shot put – F57/58
Gold medal – first place	2014 Swansea	shot put – F57
Gold medal – first place	2014 Swansea	javelin – F57
Silver medal – second place	2012 Stadskanaal	discus – F57/58
Silver medal – second place	2016 Grosseto	Shot put – F57
Bronze medal – third place	2016 Grosseto	Discus – F57

Alexey Vitalyevich Ashapatov (Алексей Витальевич Ашапатов; born 30 October 1973) is a Russian para-athlete competing mainly in category F57–58 throwing events.

He competed in the 2008 Summer Paralympics in Beijing, China. There he won two gold medals, one in the men's F57–58 shot put and the other in the men's F57–58 discus throw. He won the same events four years later, at the 2012 Summer Paralympics in London, United Kingdom.
