= Draženko Mitrović =

Serbian Paralympic athlete

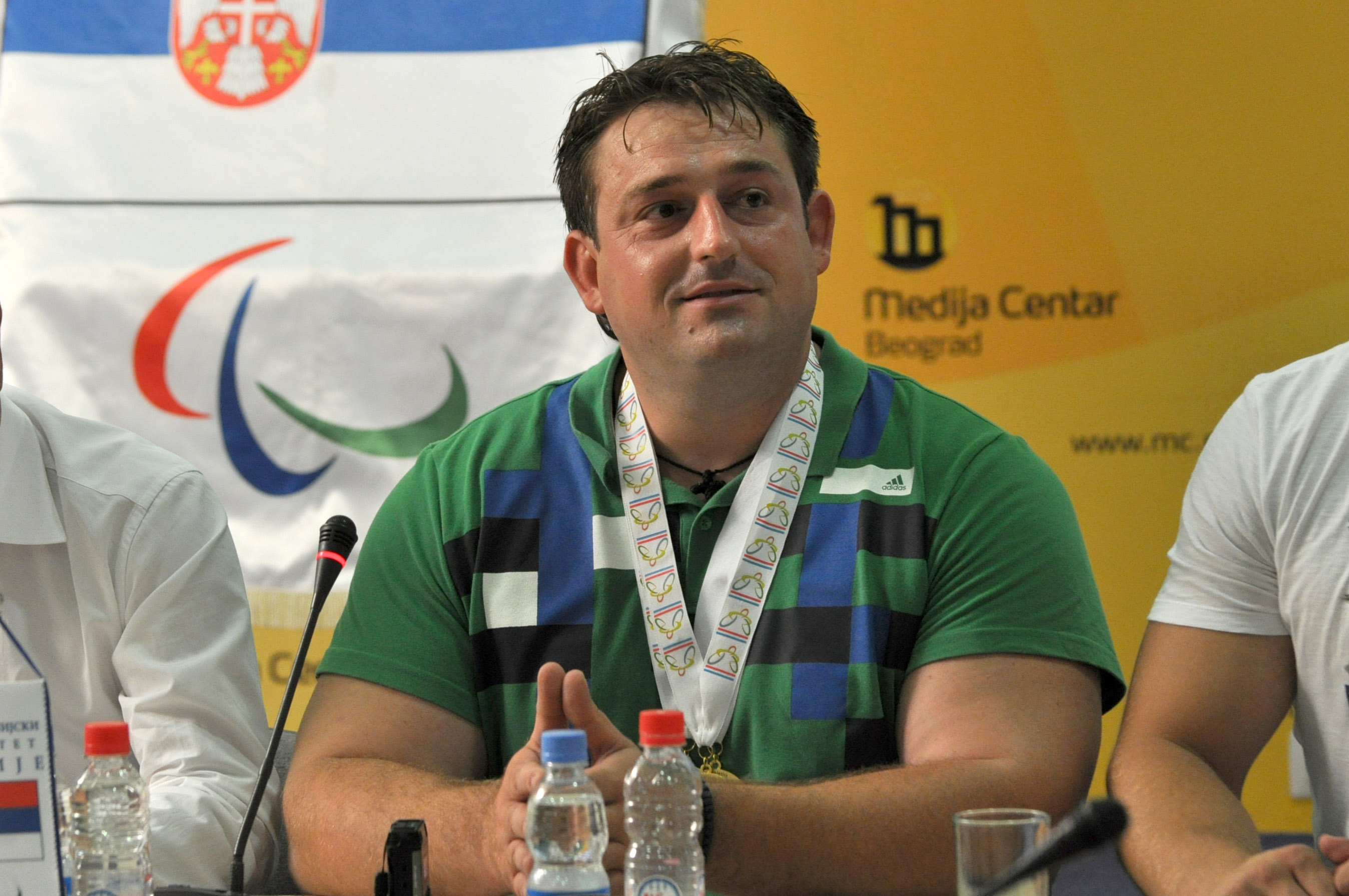
- Draženko Mitrović

Personal information
- Nationality: Serbian
- Born: 9 August 1979 (age 46) Banja Luka, Bosnia and Herzegovina, Yugoslavia

Sport
- Sport: Athletics
- Event(s): Discus throw Javelin throw Shot put
Medal record
Representing Serbia
Event	1st	2nd	3rd
Paralympic Games	0	2	0
World Championships	0	5	0
European Championships	2	0	2
Men's Athletics
Paralympic Games
Silver medal – second place	2008 Beijing	Discus throw – F53/54
Silver medal – second place	2012 London	Discus throw – F54–56
IPC Athletics World Championships
Silver medal – second place	2006 Assen	Discus throw – F54–56
Silver medal – second place	2011 Christchurch	Javelin throw – F54–56
Silver medal – second place	2011 Christchurch	Discus throw – F54–56
Silver medal – second place	2011 Christchurch	Shot put – F54–56
Silver medal – second place	2013 Lyon	Discus throw – F54–56
IPC Athletics European Championships
Gold medal – first place	2012 Stadskanaal	Shot put – F54
Gold medal – first place	2012 Stadskanaal	Discus – F54
Silver medal – second place	2014 Swansea	Shot put – F53/54/55
Bronze medal – third place	2012 Stadskanaal	Javelin – F54
Bronze medal – third place	2014 Swansea	Javelin – F54

Draženko Mitrović (Serbian Cyrillic: Драженко Митровић, born 9 August 1979 in Banja Luka, Bosnia and Herzegovina, Yugoslavia) is a Paralympian athlete from Serbia competing mainly in category F53/54 discus events.

== Biography ==
He was wounded by gunfire in 1989 and then became a paraplegic. Draženko competed in the 2008 Summer Paralympics where he finished second in the F53/54 discus and also competed in the javelin.
