= Tomasz Blatkiewicz =

Polish Paralympic athlete

Medal record

Paralympic athletics

Representing Poland

Paralympic Games
Gold medal – first place	2004 Athens	Discus Throw – F37
Gold medal – first place	2004 Athens	Shot Put – F37
Silver medal – second place	2008 Beijing	Shot Put - F37/38

Tomasz Blatiewicz is a Paralympian athlete from Poland competing mainly in category F37 throws events.

Tomasz won two golds in the 2004 Summer Paralympics in Athens, Greece in the F37 discus and the F37 shot put. On returning four years later in 2008 in Beijing he could not manage to defend his titles only manage a silver in the F37/38 shot put and was outside the medals in the F37/38 discus
