= Janusz Rokicki =

Polish Paralympic athlete (born 1974)

Personal information
- Nationality: Polish
- Born: 16 August 1974 (age 51)

Sport
- Country: Poland
- Sport: Paralympic athletics
- Disability class: F57
- Event: Throwing events
Medal record
| Event | 1st | 2nd | 3rd |
|---|---|---|---|
| Paralympic Games | 0 | 3 | 0 |
| World Championships | 1 | 1 | 1 |
| European Championships | 1 | 3 | 0 |
Paralympic athletics
Representing Poland
Paralympic Games
| Silver medal – second place | 2004 Athens | Shot put – F58 |
| Silver medal – second place | 2012 London | Shot put – F57–58 |
| Silver medal – second place | 2016 Rio de Janeiro | Shot put – F57 |
IPC Athletics World Championships
| Gold medal – first place | 2015 Doha | Shot put F57/58 |
| Silver medal – second place | 2013 Lyon | Shot put F57/58 |
| Bronze medal – third place | 2017 London | Shot put F57 |
IPC European Championships
| Gold medal – first place | 2016 Grosseto | Shot put – F57 |
| Silver medal – second place | 2012 Stadskanaal | Shot put – F56/57/58 |
| Silver medal – second place | 2014 Swansea | Shot put – F57 |
| Silver medal – second place | 2016 Grosseto | Discus – F57 |

Janusz Rokicki (born 16 August 1974 in Wisła) is a paralympic athlete from Poland competing mainly in category F57 shot put and discus events.

Janusz competed in the 2004 Summer Paralympics he competed in the discus and won a silver in the F58 shot put. In 2008 in the shot put but failed to win a second medal.
