= Dušan Grézl =

Czech Paralympic athlete

Personal information
- Born: 4 May 1979 (age 47)

Sport
- Country: Czech Republic
- Sport: Paralympic athletics
- Disability class: F38
- Event: Throwing events
Medal record
Event	1st	2nd	3rd
Paralympic Games	0	0	1
World Championships	0	0	2
European Championships	1	1	1
Paralympic athletics
Representing Czech Republic
Paralympic Games
Bronze medal – third place	2004 Athens	Shot put - F38
IPC Athletics World Championships
Bronze medal – third place	2013 Lyon	Shot put F38
Bronze medal – third place	2015 Doha	Shot put F38
IPC European Championships
Gold medal – first place	2016 Grosseto	Shot put - F38
Silver medal – second place	2014 Swansea	Shot put - F38
Bronze medal – third place	2012 Stadskanaal	Shot put - F38

Dušan Grézl (born 4 May 1979) is a Paralympic athlete from the Czech Republic competing mainly in category F38 shot put events.

Dušan competed in all three throws in the 2004 Summer Paralympics at the F38 class, winning the bronze medal in the shot put. The shot put was the only event he competed at in Beijing in 2008 finishing 9th in the combined F37/38 event.
