= Mykola Zhabnyak =

Ukrainian Paralympic athlete

Personal information
- Nationality: Ukrainian
- Born: 30 September 1979 (age 46)

Sport
- Country: Ukraine
- Sport: Paralympic athletics
- Disability class: F37
- Event: Throwing events
Medal record
Event	1st	2nd	3rd
Paralympic Games	0	2	0
World Championships	2	1	1
European Championships	0	2	1
Paralympic athletics
Representing Ukraine
Paralympic Games
Silver medal – second place	2008 Beijing	Discus – F37/38
Silver medal – second place	2020 Tokyo	Discus – F37
World Championships
Gold medal – first place	2013 Lyon	Discus – F37/38
Gold medal – first place	2023 Paris	Discus – F37
Silver medal – second place	2011 Christchurch	Discus – F37/38
Bronze medal – third place	2013 Lyon	Shot put – F37
Bronze medal – third place	2015 Doha	Shot put – F37
Bronze medal – third place	2025 New Delhi	Discus – F37
European Championships
Silver medal – second place	2012 Stadskanaal	Shot put – F37
Silver medal – second place	2012 Stadskanaal	Discus – F37/38
Bronze medal – third place	2014 Swansea	Shot put – F37

Mykola Zhabnyak (born 30 September 1979) is a Paralympian athlete from Ukraine competing mainly in F37/38-classified throwing events.

== Career ==
Mykola competed at the 2008 Summer Paralympics in Beijing in all three throws for the F37/38 combined class, winning a silver medal in the discus.
