= Bil Marinkovic =

Austrian Paralympic athlete

Personal information
- Nationality: Austrian
- Born: 16 August 1973 (age 52)

Sport
- Country: Austria
- Sport: Paralympic athletics
- Disability class: F11
- Event: Throwing events
Medal record
Paralympic athletics
Representing Austria
Paralympic Games
Gold medal – first place	2004 Athens	Javelin throw – F11
Bronze medal – third place	2012 London	Discus throw – F11
World Championships
Silver medal – second place	2015 Doha	Discus throw – F11
Silver medal – second place	2017 London	Discus – F11
Bronze medal – third place	2013 Lyon	Javelin throw – F11
Bronze medal – third place	2024 Kobe	Discus throw – F11
European Championships
Silver medal – second place	2012 Stadskanaal	Shot put – F11
Silver medal – second place	2012 Stadskanaal	Discus – F11

Bil Marinkovic (born 16 August 1973) is a blind Paralympic athlete from Austria who competes mostly in throwing events.

== Career ==
Bil has competed in four consecutive Paralympics. In his first appearance in 2000 he competed in the F12 discus, javelin, pentathlon and 100m, failing to win a medal in any of the disciplines. At the 2004 Summer Paralympics he competed in the more severe F11 classification, for athletes with no usable vision. He won the gold medal in the javelin, breaking the then world record with his throw. He won a bronze medal in the F11 discus event at the 2012 Summer Paralympics. He has won multiple IPC Athletics World Championships medals.

Marinkovic is the current F11 world record holder in javelin.

Currently, Marinkovic is trained by the former Olympic athlete and Gerhard Mayer.
