= Vladimir Andryushchenko =

Russian Paralympic athlete (born 1982)

Personal information
- Nationality: Russian
- Born: 8 April 1982 (age 44)

Sport
- Country: Russia
- Sport: Paralympic athletics
- Disability: Visual impairment
- Disability class: F12
- Event: Throwing events
Medal record
Men's para athletics
Representing Russia
Event	1st	2nd	3rd
Paralympic Games	0	3	0
World Championships	1	3	0
European Championships	0	1	0
Paralympic Games
Silver medal – second place	2004 Athens	Shot Put – F13
Silver medal – second place	2008 Beijing	Shot p0ut – F11/12
Silver medal – second place	2012 London	Shot put – F11/12
World Championships
Gold medal – first place	2011 Christchurch	Shot put F12
Silver medal – second place	2011 Christchurch	Discus F12
Silver medal – second place	2013 Lyon	Discus F12
Silver medal – second place	2013 Lyon	Shot put F12
European Championships
Silver medal – second place	2012 Stadskanaal	Shot put – F12

Vladimir Andryushchenko (Russian: Владимир Васильевич Андрющенко, born 8 April 1982) is a Paralympian athlete from Russia competing mainly in category F12 throwing events.

Andryushchenko has competed at two summer Paralympics. In 2004 he competed in the F12 javelin, F13 shot put and won a silver medal in the F12 discus. In 2008 he competed in the F11/12 discus and won a second silver in the F11/12 shot put.

== Honours and awards ==
Andryushchenko has been recognised several times by his country for his achievements in sport. In 2012 he was made Merited Master of Sports of the USSR.
