= Frank Tinnemeier =

German Paralympic athlete (born 1972)

Personal information
- Born: 25 August 1972 (age 53) Lemgo, Germany
- Height: 1.80 m (5 ft 11 in)

Sport
- Country: Germany
- Sport: Paralympic athletics
- Disability class: T63
Medal record
Paralympic athletics
Representing Germany
World Championships
Silver medal – second place	2013 Lyon	Shot put F42
Bronze medal – third place	2015 Doha	Shot put F42
Bronze medal – third place	2017 London	Shot put F42
European Championships
Gold medal – first place	2012 Stadskanaal	Shot put F42
Silver medal – second place	2014 Swansea	Shot put F42

Frank Tinnemeier (born 25 August 1972) is a German Paralympic athlete who competes in shot put at international elite events. He is a three-time world medalist and a European champion, who has also competed at the Paralympic Games three times.
