= Kim López =

Spanish Paralympic athlete

Kim López González
Personal information
- Born: 4 January 1989 (age 37) Valencia, Spain

Sport
- Country: Spain
- Disability: Myopia
- Disability class: T12
Medal record
Paralympic athletics
Representing Spain
Paralympic Games
Gold medal – first place	2016 Rio de Janeiro	Shot put F12
Gold medal – first place	2020 Tokyo	Shot put F12
World Championships
Gold medal – first place	2013 Lyon	Discus throw F12
Gold medal – first place	2024 Kobe	Shot put F12
Silver medal – second place	2015 Doha	Discus throw F12
Silver medal – second place	2019 Dubai	Shot put F12
Bronze medal – third place	2011 Christchurch	Discus throw F12
Bronze medal – third place	2015 Doha	Shot put F12
Bronze medal – third place	2017 London	Discus throw F12
Bronze medal – third place	2017 London	Shot put F12
European Championships
Gold medal – first place	2014 Swansea	Discus throw F12
Gold medal – first place	2014 Swansea	Shot put F12
Gold medal – first place	2016 Grosseto	Discus throw F12
Gold medal – first place	2016 Grosseto	Shot put F12
Gold medal – first place	2021 Bydgoszcz	Shot put F12
Silver medal – second place	2018 Berlin	Shot put F12
Silver medal – second place	2018 Berlin	Discus throw F12

Kim López González (born 4 January 1989) is a Spanish para-track and field athlete who competed at the 2016 Summer Paralympics in the T12/F12 shot put. He won a gold medal in the shot put with a personal best distance of 16.44 metres. He won a gold medal in the 2020 Summer Paralympics in the F12 shot put, establishing a new world record.
