= Karol Kozuń =

Polish Paralympic athlete (born 1982)

Personal information
- Full name: Karol Wojciech Kozuń
- Nickname: Koza
- Born: 23 March 1982 (age 44) Sieradz, Poland
- Height: 190 cm (6 ft 3 in)

Sport
- Country: Poland
- Sport: Athletics
- Disability class: F55
- Event(s): Shot put Javelin throw
- Club: BWAA
- Coached by: Wojciech Kikowski (club); Zbigniew Lewkowicz (national)

Achievements and titles
- Paralympic finals: 2008 Beijing; 2012 London
Medal record
Representing Poland
Athletics
Paralympic Games
Bronze medal – third place	2012 London	Men's shot put F54–56
IPC World Championships
Gold medal – first place	2011 Christchurch	Men's shot put F54–56
Gold medal – first place	2013 Lyon	Men's shot put F54/55
Bronze medal – third place	2015 Doha	Men's shot put F55

Karol Wojciech Kozuń (born 23 March 1982) is a Paralympian track and field athlete from Poland competing mainly in category F55 throwing events. He competed in two Summer Paralympics winning a silver medal in the discus at the 2012 Summer Paralympics in London.

== Personal career ==
Kozuń was born in Sieradz, Poland in 1982. In 2005 he suffered a broken spine after a traffic accident.
