= Mirosław Madzia =

Polish Paralympic athlete

Personal information
- Nickname: Mirek
- Born: 25 October 1979 (age 46) Skoczow, Poland
- Height: 1.98 m (6 ft 6 in)

Sport
- Country: Poland
- Sport: Paralympic athletics
- Disability class: T11
- Club: IKS Cieszyn
Medal record
Paralympic athletics
Representing Poland
European Championships
Silver medal – second place	2014 Swansea	Men's discus throw F11
Bronze medal – third place	2012 Stadskanaal	Men's discus throw F11
Bronze medal – third place	2012 Stadskanaal	Men's shot put F11
Bronze medal – third place	2018 Berlin	Men's shot put F11

Mirosław Madzia (born 25 October 1979) is a Polish Paralympic athlete who competes in international elite events. He competes in discus throw and shot put and has won four medals in the World Para Athletics European Championships. He competed at the 2016 Summer Paralympics in the discus throw but did not medal.
