= Krzysztof Smorszczewski =

Polish shot putter (born 1963)

Personal information
- Nationality: Polish
- Born: 26 May 1963 (age 63)

Sport
- Country: Poland
- Sport: Paralympic athletics
- Disability class: F56
- Event: Throwing events
Medal record
Event	1st	2nd	3rd
Paralympic Games	2	1	0
World Championships	0	0	0
European Championships	0	0	1
Paralympic athletics
Representing Poland
Paralympic Games
Gold medal – first place	2000 Sydney	Shot put – F56
Gold medal – first place	2004 Athens	Shot put – F56
Silver medal – second place	2008 Beijing	Shot put – F55/56
IPC European Championships
Bronze medal – third place	2012 Stadskanaal	Shot put – F56/57/58

Krzysztof Smorszczewski (born 26 May 1963) is a Paralympian athlete from Poland competing mainly in category F56 shot put events.

Krzysztof is a two time Paralympic gold medalist in the shot put having won the F56 class in 2000 and 2004 and won a silver in the 2008 Summer Paralympics. He also competed in the javelin in the 2000 and 2004 Paralympics.
