= Adrián Matušík =

Slovak Paralympic athlete

Personal information
- Born: 13 April 1980 (age 46) Bratislava, Czechoslovakia
- Height: 1.98 m (6 ft 6 in)

Sport
- Country: Slovakia
- Sport: Paralympic athletics
- Disability class: F44
- Event(s): Discus throw Shot put
- Club: AK Nové Zámky
Medal record
Paralympic athletics
Representing Slovakia
World Championships
Gold medal – first place	2015 Doha	Men's shot put F44
Silver medal – second place	2013 Lyon	Men's shot put F44
Silver medal – second place	2017 London	Men's shot put F44
Bronze medal – third place	2013 Lyon	Men's discus throw F44
European Championships
Gold medal – first place	2014 Swansea	Men's shot put F44
Silver medal – second place	2014 Swansea	Men's discus throw F44
Silver medal – second place	2016 Grosseto	Men's shot put F44
Bronze medal – third place	2016 Grosseto	Men's discus throw F44/46
Bronze medal – third place	2018 Berlin	Men's discus throw F64

Adrián Matušík (born 13 June 1980) is a Slovak Paralympic athlete who competes in discus throw and shot put events at international elite events. He is a former world and European champion in F44 shot put.

Matušík took part in the 2012 Summer Paralympics, finishing fourth in the discus throw. He also participated in the shot put, placing eighth.

In 2014 he was the European champion in shot put, throwing more than 1.5 metres more than his closest rival in the final. He became World champion in shot put at the 2015 IPC Athletics World Championships, where he threw a personal best 17.19 metres. Matušík was one of two selected to represent his country in athletics at the 2016 Summer Paralympics.

Matušík had his left leg severely injured in 2001 after an accident while digging a well which resulted in his leg amputated below the knee.
