= Mathias Schulze =

German Paralympic athlete (born 1986)

Personal information
- Born: 8 October 1986 (age 39) Magdeburg, East Germany
- Height: 2.00 m (6 ft 7 in)

Sport
- Country: Germany
- Sport: Paralympic athletics
- Disability: Dysmelia
- Disability class: F46
- Event(s): Discus throw Shot put Javelin throw
- Club: BPRSV Cottbus
Medal record
Paralympic athletics
Representing Germany
World Championships
Silver medal – second place	2017 London	Shot put F46
Bronze medal – third place	2013 Lyon	Shot put F46
European Championships
Gold medal – first place	2018 Berlin	Shot put F46
Silver medal – second place	2016 Grosseto	Shot put F46
Silver medal – second place	2016 Grosseto	Javelin throw F46
Bronze medal – third place	2014 Swansea	Discus throw F46
Bronze medal – third place	2014 Swansea	Javelin throw F46
Bronze medal – third place	2014 Swansea	Shot put F46

Mathias Uwe Schulze (born 8 October 1986) is a German Paralympic athlete who competes in discus throw, javelin throw and shot put at international elite events. He is a two-time World medalist and a European champion in shot put. He was born without his left hand.
