= Athletics at the 2024 Summer Paralympics – Men's shot put =

Event at the 2024 Summer Paralympics

Athletics – Men's shot put at the XVII Paralympic Games
- Venue: Stade de France
- Dates: 30 August – 7 September 2024
- No. of events: 16

The Men's shot put athletics events for the 2024 Summer Paralympics took place at the Stade de France, Paris from August 30 to September 7, 2024. A total of 16 events were contested in this discipline, all of which consisted of straight finals.

== Schedule ==
R	Round 1	½	Semifinals	F	Final

Date	Fri 30		Sat 31		Sun 1		Mon 2		Tue 3		Wed 4		Thu 5		Fri 6		Sat 7	
Event	M	E	M	E	M	E	M	E	M	E	M	E	M	E	M	E	M	E
F11								F										
F12			F															
F20										F								
F32										F								
F33																		F
F34																	F	
F35														F				
F36									F									
F37		F																
F40					F													
F41							F											
F46											F							
F53					F													
F55		F																
F57																F		
F63																		F

== Medal summary ==
The following is a summary of the medals awarded across all shot put events.

Classification	Gold		Silver		Bronze	
F11	Amirhossein Darbeid; Iran	14.78 AR	Mahdi Olad; Iran	13.89	Alvaro del Amo Cano; Spain	13.38
F12	Elbek Sultonov; Uzbekistan	16.45	Volodymyr Ponomarenko; Ukraine	16.12	Roman Danyliuk; Ukraine	16.11
F20	Oleksandr Yarovyi; Ukraine	17.61	Muhammad Ziyad Zolkefli; Malaysia	17.18	Maksym Koval; Ukraine	16.99
F32	Athanasios Konstantinidis; Greece	11.93	Aleksei Churkin; Neutral Paralympic Athletes	11.39	Lazaros Stefanidis; Greece	9.84
F33	Cai Bingchen; China	12.77 WR	Deni Cerni; Croatia	12.18	Zakariae Derhem; Morocco	11.26
F34	Mauricio Valencia; Colombia	11.71	Azeddine Nouiri; Morocco	11.70	Ahmad Hindi; Jordan	11.66
F35	Khusniddin Norbekov; Uzbekistan	16.82	Hernan Emanuel Urra; Argentina	16.11	Seyed Aliasghar Javanmardi; Iran	15.84
F36	Vladimir Sviridov; Neutral Paralympic Athletes	17.18 WR	Alan Kokoity; Neutral Paralympic Athletes	16.27	Dastan Mukashbekov; Kazakhstan	16.00
F37	Kudratillokhon Marufkhujaev; Uzbekistan	16.37	Ahmed Ben Moslah; Tunisia	15.40	Tolibboy Yuldashev; Uzbekistan	15.24
F40	Miguel Monteiro; Portugal	11.21	Battulga Tsegmid; Mongolia	11.09	Garrah Tnaiash; Iraq	11.03
F41	Bobirjon Omonov; Uzbekistan	14.32 PR	Niko Kappel; Germany	13.74	Jun Huang; China	11.66
F46	Greg Stewart; Canada	16.38	Sachin Sarjerao Khilari; India	16.32	Luka Bakovic; Croatia	16.27
F53	Giga Ochkhikidze; Georgia	9.66	Abdelillah Gani; Morocco	9.22	Hemami Alireza Mokhtari; Iran	8.69
F55	Ruzhdi Ruzhdi; Bulgaria	12.40	Nebojsa Duric; Serbia	11.98	Lech Stoltman; Poland	11.81
F55	Ruzhdi Ruzhdi; Bulgaria	12.40	Zafar Zaker; Iran	11.88	Lech Stoltman; Poland	11.81
F57	Yasin Khosravi; Iran	15.96	Thiago Paulino dos Santos; Brazil	15.06	Hokato Hotozhe Sema; India	14.65
F63	Faisal Sorour; Kuwait	15.31	Aled Davies; Great Britain	15.10	Tom Habscheid; Luxembourg	14.97

== Results ==
=== F11 ===
Men's shot put F11 at the XVII Paralympic Games
- Venue: Stade de France, Paris
- Dates: 2 September 2024
- Competitors: 8 from 7 nations
- Winning distance: 14.78 AR

Medalists
1st place, gold medalist(s)		Amirhossein Darbeid	Iran
2nd place, silver medalist(s)		Mahdi Olad	Iran
3rd place, bronze medalist(s)		Alvaro del Amo Cano	Spain

Records

Prior to this competition, the existing world, Paralympic, and area records were as follows:

World record	David Casinos Sierra (ESP)	15.26	(Australia) Sydney	20 October 2000
Paralympic record	David Casinos Sierra (ESP)	15.26	(Australia) Sydney	20 October 2000

Area	Time		Athlete	Location	Date
Africa	11.30		(Tunisia) Amir Soltane	(Tunisia) Tunis	30 June 2019
America	14.16		(Brazil) Alessandro R Da Silva	(Brazil) São Paulo	2 April 2022
Asia	14.61		(Iran) Amirhossein A Darbeid	(Japan) Kobe	20 May 2024
Europe	15.26	WR	(Spain) David Casinos Sierra	(Australia) Sydney	20 October 2000
Oceania	8.98		(Fiji) Semeti Matanitobua	(Japan) Kobe	20 May 2024

Results

The final in this classification took place on 2 September 2024, at 19:46: Eight athletes took part in a straight final.

Reigning Paralympic Games champion, Mahdi Olad of Iran returned to defend his title, but in the end had to settle for silver behind his countryman, Amirhossein Darbeid, as the Islamic Republic went one-two in the F11 classification and Darbeid took the Asian record with a throw of 14.78 metres. Every one of Darbeid's throws would have been good enough for gold, his five throws over 14 metres the only efforts over that measure in the competition.

Álvaro del Amo Cano of Spain narrowly held off the Neutral Paralympic Athlete, Igor Baskakov, for bronze.

Rank	Athlete	Nationality	1	2	3	4	5	6	Best	Notes
1st place, gold medalist(s)	Amirhossein Darbeid	Iran	13.94	14.71	14.46	14.46	14.78	14.72	14.78	AR
2nd place, silver medalist(s)	Mahdi Olad	Iran	13.52	13.89	13.51	12.02	13.59	13.83	13.89	
3rd place, bronze medalist(s)	Alvaro del Amo Cano	Spain	x	12.00	x	13.33	13.38	x	13.38	
4	Igor Baskakov	Neutral Paralympic Athletes	12.36	13.12	12.72	13.19	13.29	13.03	13.29	
5	Alessandro Rodrigo da Silva	Brazil	12.07	12.86	x	x	x	11.63	12.86	
6	Miljenko Vučić	Croatia	x	12.09	12.33	11.93	12.27	11.46	12.33	
7	Oney Tapia	Italy	x	11.64	x	x	x	12.12	12.12	
8	Ongiou Timeon	Kiribati	x	6.46	6.29	6.17	x	5.84	6.46	

=== F12 ===
Men's shot put F12 at the XVII Paralympic Games
- Venue: Stade de France, Paris
- Dates: 31 August 2024
- Competitors: 8 from 6 nations
- Winning distance: 16.45 AR

Medalists
1st place, gold medalist(s)		Elbek Sultonov	Uzbekistan
2nd place, silver medalist(s)		Volodymyr Ponomarenko	Ukraine
3rd place, bronze medalist(s)		Roman Danyliuk	Ukraine

Records

Prior to this competition, the existing world, Paralympic, and area records were as follows:

World record	Kim Lopez Gonzalez (ESP)	17.04	(Japan) Tokyo	28 August 2021
Paralympic record	Kim Lopez Gonzalez (ESP)	17.04	(Japan) Tokyo	28 August 2021

Area	Time		Athlete	Location	Date
Africa	12.98		(South Africa) Hermanus Blom	(United Kingdom) London	22 July 2017
America	16.35		(Brazil) Caio Vinicius	(United States) Tempe	25 May 2019
Asia	16.62		(China) Haitao Sun	(Greece) Athens	21 Sept 2004
Europe	17.04	WR PR	(Spain) Kim López González	(Japan) Tokyo	28 August 2021
Oceania	15.57		(Australia) Russell Short	(Netherlands) Assen	9 September 2006

Results

The final in this classification took place on 31 August 2024, at 19:46: Eight athletes took part in a straight final. Reigning champion and world record holder Kim Lopez Gonzales of Spain returned, but was not in his record breaking form and had to settle for fourth. Instead Elbek Sultonov, from Uzbekistan seized his opportunity, thowing a new Asian record of 16.45 metres to win gold and hold off the two Ukrainians, Volodymyr Ponomarenko and Roman Danyliuk, the pair winning silver and bronze respectively, separated a single centimetre.

Rank	Athlete	Nationality	1	2	3	4	5	6	Best	Notes
1st place, gold medalist(s)	Elbek Sultonov	Uzbekistan	15.19	x	15.88	16.45	16.02	x	16.45	AR
2nd place, silver medalist(s)	Volodymyr Ponomarenko	Ukraine	x	x	12.70	16.12	16.01	x	16.12	
3rd place, bronze medalist(s)	Roman Danyliuk	Ukraine	14.41	15.17	15.18	16.11	15.54	15.56	16.11	
4	Kim Lopez-Gonzalez	Spain	14.93	x	15.6	15.51	x	15.15	15.60	
5	Emils Dzilna	Latvia	14.76	15.00	15.18	15.60	15.37	15.13	15.60	
6	Stefan Dimitrijevic	Serbia	13.64	13.48	14.15	14.60	13.51	13.04	14.60	
7	Hermanus Blom	South Africa	x	x	11.6	x	13.16	x	13.16	
8	Hector Cabrera Llacer	Spain	11.96	12.92	11.64	12.18	11.22	11.91	12.92	

=== F20 ===
Men's shot put F20 at the XVII Paralympic Games
- Venue: Stade de France, Paris
- Dates: 3 September 2024
- Competitors: 8 from 7 nations
- Winning distance: 17.61 WR

Medalists
1st place, gold medalist(s)		Oleksandr Yarovyi	Ukraine
2nd place, silver medalist(s)		Muhammad Ziyad Zolkefli	Malaysia
3rd place, bronze medalist(s)		Maksym Koval	Ukraine

Records

Prior to this competition, the existing world, Paralympic, and area records were as follows:

World record	Maksym Koval (UKR)	17.57	(France) Paris	13 July 2023
Paralympic record	Maksym Koval (UKR)	17.34	(Japan) Tokyo	31 August 2021

Area	Time		Athlete	Location	Date
Africa	11.99		(Tunisia) Mohamed Ali Fatnasi	(United Kingdom) London	7 September 2012
America	16.72		(Ecuador) David Mosquera	(United Kingdom) London	15 July 2017
Asia	17.43		(Malaysia) Muhammad Ziyad Zolkefli	(Japan) Kobe	21 May 2024
Europe	17.57	WR	(Ukraine) Maksym Koval	(France) Paris	13 July 2023
Oceania	16.29		(Australia) Todd Hodgetts	(United Kingdom) London	7 September 2012

Results

The final in this classification took place on 3 September 2024, at 19:46: Eight athletes took part in a straight final.

The 2020 champion, Maksym Koval was obliged to watch both his title and his world, European and Paralympic Games records usurped by country man Oleksandr Yarovyi. Muhammad Ziyad Zolkefli of Malaysia separates the Ukrainians.

Rank	Athlete	Nationality	1	2	3	4	5	6	Best	Notes
1st place, gold medalist(s)	Oleksandr Yarovyi	Ukraine	16.86	17.11	17.6	17.61	16.89	17.56	17.61	WR
2nd place, silver medalist(s)	Muhammad Ziyad Zolkefli	Malaysia	16.75	16.66	17.18	16.79	17	16.86	17.18	
3rd place, bronze medalist(s)	Maksym Koval	Ukraine	x	16.99	16.77	x	x	x	16.99	
4	Luka Meissonnier Soane	France	15.23	15.64	16.42	16.06	15.94	15.5	16.42	
5	Muhammet Atici	Turkey	x	15.56	16.04	15.33	15.48	16.09	16.09	
6	Jordi Congo Villalba	Ecuador	14.57	15.61	16.01	15.63	x	15.14	16.01	
7	Efstratios Nikolaidis	Greece	x	15.27	15.66	15.13	x	15.3	15.66	
8	Istvan Szollosi	Hungary	13.91	13.91	14.05	x	x	13.79	14.05	

=== F32 ===
Men's shot put F32 at the XVII Paralympic Games
- Venue: Stade de France, Paris
- Dates: 3 September 2024
- Competitors: 8 from 4 nations
- Winning distance: 11.93

Medalists
1st place, gold medalist(s)		Athanasios Konstantinidis	Greece
2nd place, silver medalist(s)		Aleksei Churkin	Neutral Paralympic Athletes
3rd place, bronze medalist(s)		Lazaros Stefanidis	Greece

Records

Prior to this competition, the existing world, Paralympic, and area records were as follows:

World record	Liu Li (CHN)	13.01	(France) Paris	13 July 2023
Paralympic record	Liu Li (CHN)	12.97	(Japan) Tokyo	31 August 2021

Area	Time	Athlete	Location	Date
Africa	12.11	(Algeria) Walid Ferhah	(United Arab Emirates) Sharjah	15 March 2022
America	8.19	(Brazil) Robson Daniel dos Santos	(Brazil) São Paulo	16 March 2024
Asia	13.01	(China) Li Liu	(France) Paris	13 August 2023
Europe	11.65	(Russia) Aleksei Churkin	(Russia) Cheboksary	15 August 2023
Oceania	vacant			

Results

The final in this classification took place on 3 September 2024, at 19:46: Eight athletes took part in a straight final.

With the late reclassification of reigning champion and world record holder Liu Li to the F33 class, the F32 event was opened up for a new winner, with the honours going to the 54-years old Greek veteran Athanasios Konstantinidis. Neutral athlete Aleksei Churkin won silver, and a second older Greek athlete, Lazaros Stefanidis, won the bronze medal at the age of 67. The silver and bronze medalists enjoyed an age-gap of 41 years - Stefanidis won his first Paralympic Games medal in Paris, having made his debut in the 2000 Games - at which point Churkin had been aged 2.

Rank	Athlete	Nationality	1	2	3	4	5	6	Best	Notes
1st place, gold medalist(s)	Athanasios Konstantinidis	Greece	11.17	11.57	11.20	10.94	11.92	11.93	11.93	
2nd place, silver medalist(s)	Aleksei Churkin	Neutral Paralympic Athletes	11.39	x	11.35	11.33	x	10.91	11.39	
3rd place, bronze medalist(s)	Lazaros Stefanidis	Greece	9.84	x	x	8.03	8.86	9.63	9.84	
4	Lahouari Bahlaz	Algeria	x	8.58	x	x	x	9.70	9.70	
5	Walid Ferhah	Algeria	9.20	x	x	x	8.72	x	9.20	
6	Dimitrios Zisidis	Greece	8.64	8.62	x	8.88	x	x	8.88	
7	Mohammed Al Mashaykhi	Oman	7.96	8.57	8.18	8.09	8.26	8.46	8.57	
8	Ahmed Mehideb	Algeria	8.56	8.39	8.30	8.35	x	x	8.56	

=== F33 ===
Men's shot put F33 at the XVII Paralympic Games
- Venue: Stade de France, Paris
- Dates: 7 September 2024
- Competitors: 7 from 6 nations
- Winning distance: 12.77 WR

Medalists
1st place, gold medalist(s)		Cai Bingchen	China
2nd place, silver medalist(s)		Deni Cerni	Croatia
3rd place, bronze medalist(s)		Zakariae Derhem	Morocco

Records

Prior to this competition, the existing world, Paralympic, and area records were as follows:

World record	Evgenii Malykh (RUS)	12.36	(Qatar) Doha	25 October 2015
Paralympic record	Zakariae Derhem (MAR)	11.37	(Japan) Tokyo	4 September 2021

Area	Time		Athlete	Location	Date
Africa	12.03		(Morocco) Zakariae Derhem	(Morocco) Marrakesh	26 April 2024
America	8.74		(Panama) Gertrudis Ortega Campos	(France) Paris	17 July 2023
Asia	12.03		(China) Cai Bingchen	(China) Hangzhou	27 October 2023
Europe	12.36	WR	(Russia) Evgenii Malykh	(Qatar) Doha	25 October 2021
Oceania	9.84		(Australia) Jessee Wyatt	(Australia) Sydney	13 March 2021

Results

The final in this classification took place on 7 September 2024, at 19:46: Seven athletes took part.

Liu Li, the F32 record holder had been reclassified shortly before the Games, but entered the F33 class with a best that would be a world record even in his new class. He failed to figure, however, as countryman Cai Bingchan threw a new world record for gold. The 2020 champion, Zakariae Derhem of Morocco, could only win bronze.

Rank	Athlete	Nationality	1	2	3	4	5	6	Best	Notes
1st place, gold medalist(s)	Cai Bingchen	China	10.38	12.08	12.16	12.22	12.77	11.1	12.77	WR
2nd place, silver medalist(s)	Deni Cerni	Croatia	11.13	10.74	11.66	11.93	12.18	11.59	12.18	
3rd place, bronze medalist(s)	Zakariae Derhem	Morocco	11.13	11.26	10.58	11.02	10.64	10.99	11.26	
4	Kamel Kardjena	Algeria	10.81	10.84	10.68	10.88	10.89	11.16	11.16	
5	Aleksandr Khrupin	Neutral Paralympic Athletes	10.87	8.59	10.06	10.6	10.96	11.03	11.03	
6	Liu Li	China	9.94	10.72	10.87	10.57	10.7	10.56	10.87	
7	Oussama Sassi	Tunisia	9.88	10.25	10.1	9.72	9.43	10.43	10.43	

=== F34 ===
Men's shot put F34 at the XVII Paralympic Games
- Venue: Stade de France, Paris
- Dates: 7 September 2024
- Competitors: 9 from 8 nations
- Winning distance: 11.71

Medalists
1st place, gold medalist(s)		Mauricio Valencia	Colombia
2nd place, silver medalist(s)		Azeddine Nouiri	Morocco
3rd place, bronze medalist(s)		Ahmad Hindi	Jordan

Records

Prior to this competition, the existing world, Paralympic, and area records were as follows:

World record	(Jordan) Ahmad Hindi	12.25	(Japan) Tokyo	4 September 2021
Paralympic record	(Jordan) Ahmad Hindi	12.25	(Japan) Tokyo	4 September 2021

Area	Time		Athlete	Location	Date
Africa	11.55		(Morocco) Azeddine Nouiri	(Japan) Tokyo	4 September 2021
America	11.83		(Brazil) Eduardo dos Santos	(Brazil) São Paulo	19 April 2024
Asia	12.25	WR PR	(Jordan) Ahmad Hindi	(Japan) Tokyo	4 September 2021
Europe	11.14		(Poland) Tomasz Paulinski	(Poland) Kraków	14 June 2024
Oceania	6.93		(Australia) Tim Ryan	(Australia) Brisbane	6 March 2015

Results

The final in this classification took place on 7 September 2024, at 19:46: In a final that contained the world and Paralympic Games record holder, and three separate continental records holders. Colombian Mauricio Valencia was the somewhat unexpected winner as his challengers failed to reach their best distances. Azeddine Nouiri extended his own African record in second place while defending champion, world and Asian record holder Ahmad Hindi held off Nikita Dubenchuk for bronze.

Rank	Athlete	Nationality	1	2	3	4	5	6	Best	Notes
1st place, gold medalist(s)	Mauricio Valencia	Colombia	11.50	x	11.08	10.96	10.59	11.71	11.71	SB
2nd place, silver medalist(s)	Azeddine Nouiri	Morocco	11.04	x	10.87	11.70	11.16	11.49	11.70	AR
3rd place, bronze medalist(s)	Ahmad Hindi	Jordan	11.54	11.66	10.9	11.51	11.55	11.48	11.66	
4	Nikita Dubenchuk	Neutral Paralympic Athletes	10.9	11.40	11.02	11.37	11.34	x	11.40	AR
5	Lin Wenbang	China	10.51	10.18	10.69	11	10.99	11.22	11.22	
6	Eduardo dos Santos Pereira	Brazil	10.79	10.86	11.03	10.83	10.95	10.81	11.03	
7	Diego Meneses	Colombia	10.63	x	10.33	9.37	x	10.35	10.63	
8	Tomasz Paulinski	Poland	8.81	10.12	10.34	10.15	10.28	8.91	10.34	
9	Salman Abbariki	Refugee Paralympic Team	8.7	8.67	8.11	8.65	8.92	8.79	8.92	

=== F35 ===
Men's shot put F35 at the XVII Paralympic Games
- Venue: Stade de France, Paris
- Dates: 5 September 2024
- Competitors: 8 from 8 nations
- Winning distance: 16.82 PR

Medalists
1st place, gold medalist(s)		Khusniddin Norbekov	Uzbekistan
2nd place, silver medalist(s)		Hernan Emanuel Urra	Argentina
3rd place, bronze medalist(s)		Seyed Aliasghar Javanmardi	Iran

Records

Prior to this competition, the existing world, Paralympic, and area records were as follows:

World record	Khusniddin Norbekov (UZB)	17.32	(United Arab Emirates) Dubai	11 November 2019
Paralympic record	Guo Wei (CHN)	16.22	(China) Beijing	14 September 2008

Area	Time		Athlete	Location	Date
Africa	11.40		(Algeria) Youssouf Bensedira	(Tunisia) Tunis	18 March 2021
America	15.90		(Argentina) Hernan Emanuel Urra	(Japan) Tokyo	2 September 2021
Asia	17.32	WR	(Uzbekistan) Khusniddin Norbekov	(United Arab Emirates) Dubai	11 November 2019
Europe	14.70		(Latvia) Edgars Bergs	(Japan) Tokyo	2 September 2021
Oceania	10.65		(Australia) Daniel Jennings	Australia	17 April 2021

Results

The final in this classification took place on 5 September 2024, at 19:46: Uzbek thrower Khusniddin Norbekov was a clear winner, with four of his throws further than any others in the competition.

Rank	Athlete	Nationality	1	2	3	4	5	6	Best	Notes
1st place, gold medalist(s)	Khusniddin Norbekov	Uzbekistan	16.01	16.82	16.14	16.32	15.63	15.72	16.82	PR
2nd place, silver medalist(s)	Hernan Emanuel Urra	Argentina	14.62	16.11	x	14.56	x	x	16.11	AR
3rd place, bronze medalist(s)	Seyed Aliasghar Javanmardi	Iran	15.84	15.6	x	x	15.73	x	15.84	
4	Fu Xinhan	China	15.64	15.75	15.47	15.52	x	15.4	15.75	
5	Taimuraz Khabalov	Neutral Paralympic Athletes	14.77	15.09	15.19	14.36	x	x	15.19	AR
6	Arvind	India	11.79	12.34	13.01	12.85	12.71	x	13.01	
7	Zholaman Yelaman	Kazakhstan	11.52	x	10.66	11.39	11.56	11.13	11.56	
8	Gheorghe Spinu	Moldova	8.88	8.64	8.41	9.62	8.56	8.99	9.62	

=== F36 ===
Men's shot put F36 at the XVII Paralympic Games
- Venue: Stade de France, Paris
- Dates: 4 September 2024
- Competitors: 7 from 6 nations
- Winning distance: 17.18 WR

Medalists
1st place, gold medalist(s)		Vladimir Sviridov	Neutral Paralympic Athletes
2nd place, silver medalist(s)		Alan Kokoity	Neutral Paralympic Athletes
3rd place, bronze medalist(s)		Dastan Mukashbekov	Kazakhstan

Records

Prior to this competition, the existing world, Paralympic, and area records were as follows:

World record	Yassine Guenichi (TUN)	16.86	(France) Paris	13 JUL 2023
Paralympic record	Vladimir Sviridov (RPC)	16.67	(Japan) Tokyo	31 AUG 2021

Area	Time		Athlete	Location	Date
Africa	16.86	WR	(Tunisia) Yassine Guenichi	(France) Paris	13 July 2023
America	15.82		(Mexico) Jose Roman Ruiz Castro	(France) Paris	13 July 2023
Asia	15.74		(Kazakhstan) Dastan Mukashbekov	(China) Hangzhou	26 October 2023
Europe	16.79		(Russia) Vladimir Sviridov	(Russia) Cheboksary	12 August 2023
Oceania	11.24		(Australia) Nicholas Larionow	(Australia) Townsville	27 Sept 2003

Results

The final in this classification took place on 4 September 2024, at 19:46: Neutral athlete, Vladimir Sviridov, made history, defending his title and becoming the first F36 athlete to breach the 17-metre barrier, his best of 17.18 exploding in the second round to put the event beyond the reach of all his rivals. Dastan Mukashbekov became the first Asian F36 athlete to breach the 16-metre line, winning a bronze medal for his efforts behind a second Neutral athlete, Alan Kokoity. Existing world record holder Yassine Guenichi of Tunisia could only finish fourth

Rank	Athlete	Nationality	1	2	3	4	5	6	Best	Notes
1st place, gold medalist(s)	Vladimir Sviridov	Neutral Paralympic Athletes	16.24	17.18	x	16.01	16.43	16.29	17.18	WR
2nd place, silver medalist(s)	Alan Kokoity	Neutral Paralympic Athletes	15.18	15.56	14.66	16.27	15.82	15.34	16.27	
3rd place, bronze medalist(s)	Dastan Mukashbekov	Kazakhstan	15.68	16.00	14.84	15.30	x	x	16.00	AR
4	Yassine Guenichi	Tunisia	15.84	15.53	15.03	15.70	x	x	15.84	
5	Jose Roman Ruiz Castro	Mexico	x	x	15.13	13.91	x	15.23	15.23	
6	Rufat Rafiyev	Azerbaijan	13.18	13.38	x	x	12.92	13.01	13.38	
7	Mohammed al Kaabi	United Arab Emirates							12.24	

=== F37 ===
Men's shot put F37 at the XVII Paralympic Games
- Venue: Stade de France, Paris
- Dates: 31 August 2024
- Competitors: 10 from 9 nations
- Winning distance: 16.37

Medalists
1st place, gold medalist(s)		Kudratillokhon Marufkhujaev	Uzbekistan
2nd place, silver medalist(s)		Ahmed Ben Moslah	Tunisia
3rd place, bronze medalist(s)		Tolibboy Yuldashev	Uzbekistan

Records

Prior to this competition, the existing world, Paralympic, and area records were as follows:

Area	Time	Athlete	Location	Date
Africa	15.59	(Tunisia) Ahmed Ben Moslah	(France) Paris	8 September 2023
America	14.56	(Mexico) Luis Carlos López Valenzuela	(Japan) Kobe	17 May 2024
Asia	17.52	(China) Dong Xia	(United Kingdom) London	
Europe	16.80	(Lithuania) Mindaugas Bilius	(Brazil) Rio de Janeiro	14 Sept 2016
Oceania	13.31	(New Zealand) Ben Tuimaseve	(Japan) Tokyo	2021-08-27

Results

The final in this classification took place on 2 September 2024, at 19:46: Kudratillokhon Marufkhujaev won by almost a metre, again giving Uzbekistan a comfortable victory.

Rank	Athlete	Nationality	1	2	3	4	5	6	Best	Notes
1st place, gold medalist(s)	Kudratillokhon Marufkhujaev	Uzbekistan	14.06	15.31	15.65	15.17	16.37	x	16.37	
2nd place, silver medalist(s)	Ahmed ben Moslah	Tunisia	14.63	x	15	15.4	14.9	x	15.40	
3rd place, bronze medalist(s)	Tolibboy Yuldashev	Uzbekistan	14.63	15.24	15.16	x	15.2	14.73	15.24	
4	De Oliveira Souza	Brazil	14.52	14.03	14.38	14.27	13.64	x	14.52	
5	Luis Carlos López Valenzuela	Mexico	x	13.57	14.31	x	13.49	13.27	14.31	
6	Manu	India	x	12.71	13.28	13.86	13.07	x	13.86	
7	Donatas Dundzys	Lithuania	12.91	13.63	13.38	13.59	13.42	13.3	13.63	
8	Mykola Zhabnyak	Ukraine	12.93	12.7	13.14	13.35	13.01	12.91	13.35	
9	Jakub Miroslaw	Poland	12.82	13.12	x				13.12	
10	Dhari Buti	Kuwait	12.66	12.38	12.31				12.66	

=== F40 ===
Men's shot put F40 at the XVII Paralympic Games
- Venue: Stade de France, Paris
- Dates: 1 September 2024
- Competitors: 9 from 9 nations
- Winning distance: 11.21 PR

Medalists
1st place, gold medalist(s)		Miguel Monteiro	Portugal
2nd place, silver medalist(s)		Battulga Tsegmid	Mongolia
3rd place, bronze medalist(s)		Garrah Tnaiash	Iraq

Records

Prior to this competition, the existing world, Paralympic, and area records were as follows:

World record	Miguel Monteiro (POR)	11.60	(Portugal) Pombal	27 February 2022
Paralympic record	Denis Gnezdilov (RPC)	11.16	(Japan) Tokyo	29 August 2021

Area	Time		Athlete	Location	Date
Africa	9.99		(Morocco) Redouane Thabit	(Tunisia) Tunis	28 June 2022
America	9.03		(Mexico) Ruben Sanchez	(Mexico) Xalapa	6 April 2024
Asia	11.28		(Iraq) Garrah Tnaiash	(France) Paris	11 July 2023
Europe	11.60	WR	(Portugal) Miguel Monteiro	(Portugal) Pombal	27 February 2022
Oceania	5.11		(New Zealand) Josh Chisholm	(Australia) Canberra	26 January 2024

Results

The final in this classification took place on 1 September 2024, at 19:46:

Rank	Athlete	Nationality	1	2	3	4	5	6	Best	Notes
1st place, gold medalist(s)	Miguel Monteiro	Portugal	x	11.02	11.21	11	11.17	r	11.21	PR
2nd place, silver medalist(s)	Battulga Tsegmid	Mongolia	9.61	9.72	10.3	10.48	11.09	x	11.09	
3rd place, bronze medalist(s)	Garrah Tnaiash	Iraq	10.44	10.7	x	10.62	11.03	10.86	11.03	
4	Denis Gnezdilov	Neutral Paralympic Athletes	10.80	10.37	10.53	10.65	10.77	10.63	10.80	
5	Ravi Rongali	India	10.44	10.49	10.63	x	9.83	10	10.63	
6	Yannis Fischer	Germany	9.93	10.24	10.56	10.21	10.18	10.23	10.56	
7	Matija Sloup	Croatia	10.07	x	10.25	10.23	x	10.19	10.25	
8	Wei Wang	China	9.83	9.90	x	x	x	x	9.90	
9	Muhammad Diroy Noordin	Singapore	8.68	x	8.66				8.68	

=== F41 ===
Men's shot put F41 at the XVII Paralympic Games
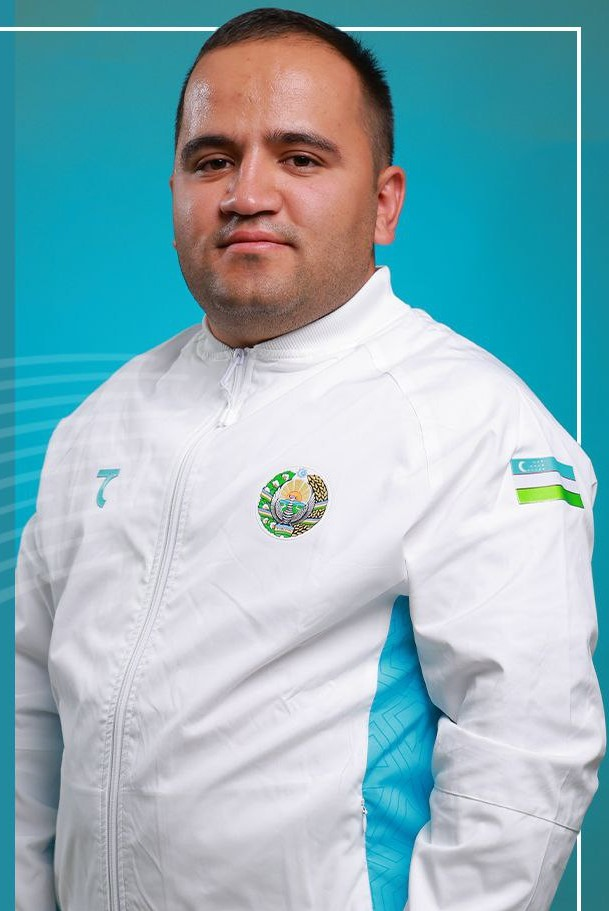
- Venue: Stade de France, Paris
- Dates: 2 September 2024
- Competitors: 7 from 5 nations
- Winning distance: 14.32 PR

Medalists
1st place, gold medalist(s)		Bobirjon Omonov	Uzbekistan
2nd place, silver medalist(s)		Niko Kappel	Germany
3rd place, bronze medalist(s)		Huang Jun	China

Records

Prior to this competition, the existing world, Paralympic, and area records were as follows:

World record	Niko Kappel (GER)	15.07	(Germany) Hechingen	9 May 2024
Paralympic record	Bobirjon Omonov (UZB)	14.06	(Japan) Tokyo	30 August 2021

Area	Time		Athlete	Location	Date
Africa	10.74		(Tunisia) Mohamed Amara	(Brazil) Rio de Janeiro	8 September 2016
America	13.88		(United States) Hagan Landry	(Japan) Tokyo	30 August 2021
Asia	14.73		(Uzbekistan) Bobirjon Omonov	(France) Paris	12 July 2023
Europe	15.07	WR	(Germany) Niko Kappel	(Germany) Hechingen	9 May 2024
Oceania	vacant				

Results

The final in this classification took place on 2 September 2024, at 19:46:

Rank	Athlete	Nationality	1	2	3	4	5	6	Best	Notes
1st place, gold medalist(s)	Bobirjon Omonov	Uzbekistan	13.55	14.32	13.33	13.23	13.99	x	14.32	PR
2nd place, silver medalist(s)	Niko Kappel	Germany	13.74	13.29	13.58	x	x	x	13.74	
3rd place, bronze medalist(s)	Huang Jun	China	11.20	11.27	x	x	11.54	11.66	11.66	
4	Xia Zhiwei	China	11.55	11.4	11.46	11.09	11.52	11.57	11.57	
5	Jung Jisong	South Korea	10.72	x	10.08	10.07	9.55	10.46	10.72	
6	Kah Michel Ye	Ivory Coast	10.42	10.3	9.88	10.34	10.39	10.46	10.46	
7	Sun Pengxiang	China	10.37	10.11	9.94	10.14	x	x	10.37	

=== F46 ===
Men's shot put F46 at the XVII Paralympic Games
- Venue: Stade de France, Paris
- Dates: 4 September 2024
- Competitors: 10 from 7 nations
- Winning distance: 16.38

Medalists
1st place, gold medalist(s)		Greg Stewart	Canada
2nd place, silver medalist(s)		Sachin Sarjerao Khilari	India
3rd place, bronze medalist(s)		Luka Baković	Croatia

Records

Prior to this competition, the existing world, Paralympic, and area records were as follows:

World record	Joshua Cinnamo (USA)	16.80	(United Arab Emirates) Dubai	15 November 2019
Paralympic record	Greg Stewart (CAN)	16.75	(Japan) Tokyo	1 September 2021

Area	Time		Athlete	Location	Date
Africa	16.13		(South Africa) Kerwin Noemdo	(Portugal) Vila Real	26 November 2022
America	16.80	WR	(United States) Joshua Cinnamo	(United Arab Emirates) Dubai	15 November 2019
Asia	16.30		(India) Sachin Sarjerao Khilari	(Japan) Kobe	22 May 2024
Europe	16.29		Nikita Prokhorov	(Japan) Tokyo	1 September 2021
Oceania	11.40		(Australia) Eric Mellor	(South Korea) Busan	3 October 2002

Results

The final in this classification took place on 4 September 2024, at 19:46:

Rank	Athlete	Nationality	1	2	3	4	5	6	Best	Notes
1st place, gold medalist(s)	Greg Stewart	Canada	15.63	16.01	16.34	x	16.38	16.02	16.38	SB
2nd place, silver medalist(s)	Sachin Sarjerao Khilari	India	14.72	16.32	16.15	16.31	16.03	15.95	16.32	AR
3rd place, bronze medalist(s)	Luka Baković	Croatia	15.03	15.6	15.85	15.75	16.27	15.77	16.27	PB
4	Joshua Cinnamo	United States	15.29	15.66	x	x	15.33	x	15.66	
5	Kerwin Noemdo	South Africa	15.63	15.53	x	15.58	x	15.41	15.63	
6	Andrius Skuja	Lithuania	14.01	14.6	14.95	x	14.76	14.66	14.95	SB
7	Erik Fabian Kaurin	Croatia	14.76	14.5	x	14.94	14.72	x	14.94	
8	Yasser Mohd	India	13.53	14.21	x	13.96	14.01	x	14.21	
9	Rohit Kumar	India	x	13.44	14.1				14.10	
10	Raivo Maksims	Latvia	11.63	11.15	11.63				11.63	
—	Chivaro Belfort	Suriname							DNS	

=== F53 ===
Men's shot put F53 at the XVII Paralympic Games
- Venue: Stade de France, Paris
- Dates: 2 September 2024
- Competitors: 7 from 7 nations
- Winning distance: 9.66

Medalists
1st place, gold medalist(s)		Giga Ochkhikidze	Georgia
2nd place, silver medalist(s)		Abdelillah Gani	Morocco
3rd place, bronze medalist(s)		Hemami Alireza Mokhtari	Iran

Records

Prior to this competition, the existing world, Paralympic, and area records were as follows:

World record	Abdelillah Gani (MAR)	8.84	(Morocco) Marrakesh	28 April 2024
Paralympic record	Elvin Astanov (AZE)	8.77	(Japan) Tokyo	29 August 2021

Area	Time		Athlete	Location	Date
Africa	8.84	WR	(Morocco) Abdelillah Gani	(Morocco) Marrakesh	28 April 2024
America	8.83		(Brazil) André Rocha	(Germany) Berlin	30 June 2018
Asia	8.73		(Iran) Alireza Mokhtari Hemami	(Indonesia) Jakarta	10 October 2018
Asia	8.73		(Iran) Rashid Masjedi	(China) Hangzhou	25 October 2023
Europe	8.79		(Georgia (country)) Giga Ochkhikidze	(Japan) Kobe	19 May 2024
Oceania	vacant				

Results

The final in this classification took place on 2 September 2024, at 19:46:

Rank	Athlete	Nationality	1	2	3	4	5	6	Best	Notes
1st place, gold medalist(s)	Giga Ochkhikidze	Georgia	x	x	x	9.66	x	x	9.66	WR
2nd place, silver medalist(s)	Abdelillah Gani	Morocco	8.98	9.1	9.06	x	9.22	9.17	9.22	AR
3rd place, bronze medalist(s)	Hemami Alireza Mokhtari	Iran	7.94	8.35	8.54	8.69	x	8.58	8.69	
4	Bartosz Gorczak	Poland	8.3	8.25	8.41	x	x	x	8.41	
5	Alaa Abdulsalam	Syria	x	8.05	8.18	7.89	8.11	x	8.18	
6	Ales Kisy	Czech Republic	7.64	x	7.8	7.85	7.98	8.12	8.12	
7	Marijan Presečan	Croatia	6.44	6.78	7.05	6.55	6.99	6.98	7.05	

=== F55 ===
Men's shot put F55 at the XVII Paralympic Games
- Venue: Stade de France, Paris
- Dates: 31 August 2024
- Competitors: 11 from 9 nations
- Winning distance: 12.4

Medalists
1st place, gold medalist(s)		Ruzhdi Ruzhdi	Bulgaria
2nd place, silver medalist(s)		Nebojsa Duric	Serbia
2nd place, silver medalist(s)		Zafar Zaker	Iran
3rd place, bronze medalist(s)		Lech Stoltman	Poland

Records

This event was also open to F54 athletes.

Prior to this competition, the existing world, Paralympic, and area records were as follows:

F54
World record	Sergei Sokulskii (RPC)	12.06	(Japan) Tokyo	27 August 2021
Paralympic record	Sergei Sokulskii (RPC)	12.06	(Japan) Tokyo	27 August 2021

Area	Time		Athlete	Location	Date
Africa	8.01		(South Africa) Ivan du Preez	(South Africa) Germiston	22 March 2003
America	10.56		(Mexico) Johnatan Salinas	(Mexico) Xalapa	28 April 2023
Asia	11.40		(Iran) Hamed Amiri	(Brazil) Rio de Janeiro	16 Sept 2023
Europe	12.06	WR PR	Sergei Sokulskii	(Japan) Tokyo	27 August 2021
Oceania	9.28		(Australia) Bruce Wallrodt	(Australia) Canberra	22 February 2003

F55
World record	Ruzhdi Ruzhdi (BUL)	12.68	(France) Paris	9 July 2023
Paralympic record	Wallace Santos (BRA)	12.63	(Japan) Tokyo	27 August 2021

Area	Time		Athlete	Location	Date
Africa	11.46		(Algeria) Mourad Bachir	(Tunisia) Tunis	28 June 2019
America	12.63	PR	(Brazil) Wallace Santos	(Japan) Tokyo	27 August 2021
Asia	12.43		(Iran) Hamed Amiri	(United Arab Emirates) Dubai	15 February 2024
Europe	12.68	WR	(Bulgaria) Ruzhdi Ruzhdi	(France) Paris	9 September 2023
Oceania	9.60		(Australia) Terry Giddy	(Australia) Canberra	22 February 2003

Results

The final in this classification took place on 2 September 2024, at 19:46: Following an appeal, a second silver medal was awarded to Nebojsa Duric, but remaining medalist retained their original medals.

Rank	Athlete	Nationality	1	2	3	4	5	6	Best	Notes
1st place, gold medalist(s)	Ruzhdi Ruzhdi	Bulgaria	12.36	11.96	12.4	12.34	12.02	12.27	12.40	SB
2nd place, silver medalist(s)	Nebojsa Duric	Serbia	11.69	11.98	11.47	11.93	11.77	11.95	11.98	SB
2nd place, silver medalist(s)	Zafar Zaker	Iran	11.56	11.88	11.73	11.55	11.77	11.83	11.88	
3rd place, bronze medalist(s)	Lech Stoltman	Poland	11.81	x	11.72	11.68	11.59	11.52	11.81	
4	Wallace Santos	Brazil	11.1	11.1	11.41	11.68	11.43	11.41	11.68	
5	Olokhan Musayev	Azerbaijan	11.13	11.22	x	11.44	11.41	11.35	11.44	SB
6	Hamed Amiri	Iran	10.6	x	10.83	10.96	11.08	11.36	11.36	
7	Damian Ligeza	Poland	11.18	11.01	10.78	10.68	10.84	10.71	11.18	
8	Sargis Stepanyan	Armenia	10.06	10.2	9.87	9.96	10.41	10.19	10.41	
9	Ivan Revenko	Neutral Paralympic Athletes	8.58	8.45	9.18	7.95	9.17	9.16	9.18	
10	Fadi Aldeeb	Palestine	8.59	8.63	8.81	8.47	8.63	8.3	8.81	SB

=== F57 ===
Men's shot put F57 at the XVII Paralympic Games
- Venue: Stade de France, Paris
- Dates: 6 September 2024
- Competitors: 12 from 11 nations
- Winning distance: 15.96 PR

Medalists
1st place, gold medalist(s)		Yasin Khosravi	Iran
2nd place, silver medalist(s)		Thiago Paulino dos Santos	Brazil
3rd place, bronze medalist(s)		Hokato Hotozhe Sema	India

Records

Prior to this competition, the existing world, Paralympic, and area records were as follows:

World record	Yasin Khosravi (IRI)	16.01	(France) Paris	16 July 2023
Paralympic record	Guoshan Wu (CHN)	15.00	(Japan) Tokyo	3 September 2021

Area	Time		Athlete	Location	Date
Africa	13.30		(Senegal) Talla Diop	(Morocco) Marrakesh	28 April 2024
America	15.26		(Brazil) Thiago Paulino dos Santos	(Peru) Lima	24 August 2019
Asia	16.01	WR	(Iran) Yasin Khosravi	(France) Paris	16 July 2023
Europe	14.92		(Poland) Janusz Rokicki	(Qatar) Doha	27 October 2023
Oceania	vacant				

Results

The final in this classification took place on 6 September 2024, at 19:46:

Rank	Athlete	Nationality	1	2	3	4	5	6	Best	Notes
1st place, gold medalist(s)	Yasin Khosravi	Iran	15.26	15.87	15.94	15.96	15.57	15.94	15.96	PR
2nd place, silver medalist(s)	Thiago Paulino	Brazil	13.87	14.63	15.06	14.89	14.87	14.76	15.06	
3rd place, bronze medalist(s)	Hokato Hotozhe Sema	India	13.88	14	14.4	14.65	14.15	13.8	14.65	
4	Teijo Kööpikkä	Finland	14.18	14.14	13.77	14.17	14.13	13.96	14.18	
5	Soman Rana	India	13.32	14.07	13.83	13.79	13.8	13.86	14.07	
6	Pablo Damián Gimenez Reinoso	Argentina	12.13	12.98	12.95	12.99	12.67	12.41	12.99	
7	Vitolio Kavakava	France	12.68	12.6	12.99	11.95	11.6	x	12.99	
8	Yorkinbek Odilov	Uzbekistan	12.3	12.09	12.95	12.41	11.73	11.74	12.95	
9	Paulin Mayombo Mukendi	Democratic Republic of the Congo	8.93	9.58	9.28	9.85	9.92	9.32	9.92	
10	Nfm Alraoad	Yemen	7.02	6.93	6.52	6.87	6.99	6.9	7.02	
11	Ywenson Registre	Haiti	6.82	6.77	6.78	6.95	6.39	6.89	6.95	
12	Omar Mahdi Abshir	Somalia	4.17	4.04	x	x	x	2.23	4.17	

=== F63 ===
Men's shot put F42/63 at the XVII Paralympic Games
- Venue: Stade de France, Paris
- Dates: 6 September 2024
- Competitors: 9 from 9 nations
- Winning distance: 15.31

Medalists
1st place, gold medalist(s)		Faisal Sorour	Kuwait
2nd place, silver medalist(s)		Aled Davies	Great Britain
3rd place, bronze medalist(s)		Tom Habscheid	Luxembourg

This event was also open to the F42 classification

Records

Prior to this competition, the existing world, Paralympic, and area records were as follows:

F42
World record	Aled Davies (GBR)	17.42	(United Kingdom) London	22 July 2017
Paralympic record	Aled Davies (GBR)	15.97	(Brazil) Rio de Janeiro	12 September 2016

Area	Time		Athlete	Location	Date
Africa	12.58		(Cameroon) William Tchuisseu Tchapo	(Italy) Jesolo	8 May 2022
America	14.40		(Brazil) Edenilson Floriani	(Brazil) São Paulo	7 May 2023
Asia	15.73		(Kuwait) Faisal Sorour	(United Arab Emirates) Sharjah	16 March 2022
Europe	17.42	WR	(United Kingdom) Aled Davies	(United Kingdom) London	22 Sept 2017
Oceania	vacant				

F63
World record	Tom Habscheid (LUX)	15.10	(United Arab Emirates) Dubai	10 November 2019
Paralympic record	Tom Habscheid (LUX)	13.92	(Japan) Tokyo	4 September 2021

Area	Time		Athlete	Location	Date
Africa	13.36		(South Africa) Tyrone Pillay	(United Arab Emirates) Dubai	10 November 2029
America	10.97		(Peru) Carlos Felipa	(Peru) Lima	7 October 2022
Asia	13.79		(China) Baolong Pang	(United Arab Emirates) Dubai	10 November 2021
Europe	15.10	WR	(Luxembourg) Tom Habscheid	(United Arab Emirates) Dubai	10 November 2019
Oceania	11.17		(New Zealand) Joe Flavell	(New Zealand) Christchurch	25 January 2011

Results

The final in this classification took place on 6 September 2024, at 19:46:

Rank	Athlete	Nationality	1	2	3	4	5	6	Best	Notes
1st place, gold medalist(s)	Faisal Sorour	Kuwait	14.7	15.01	14.92	15.31	14.88	-	15.31	
2nd place, silver medalist(s)	Aled Davies	Great Britain	14.32	14.32	15.10	x	x	x	15.10	
3rd place, bronze medalist(s)	Tom Habscheid	Luxembourg	14.09	14.97	14.87	14.5	14.45	14.77	14.97	PR^{F63}
4	Edenilson Floriani	Brazil	14.1	x	13.84	14.38	14.57	14.12	14.57	
5	Palitha Halgahawela	Sri Lanka	14.45	14.51	14.31	14.24	13.91	14.14	14.51	AR
6	Mukhammad Rikhsimov	Uzbekistan	x	x	13.31	x	13.69	x	13.69	
7	Badr Touzi	France	12.15	13.33	13.11	13	12.7	13.17	13.33	
8	Georg Schober	Austria	12.27	12.16	x	12.56	12.4	12.22	12.56	
9	Tyler Smith	Grenada	8.07	x	7.54				8.07	
—	Waleed Ashteebah	Libya							DNS	
