= 2024 World Para Athletics Championships – Men's shot put =

The men's shot put events at the 2024 World Para Athletics Championships were held in Kobe.

== Medalists ==
Event	Gold	Silver	Bronze
F11	Amirhossein Alipour Darbeid; Iran	Igor Baskakov; Neutral Paralympic Athletes (NPA)	Mahdi Olad; Iran
F12	Kim López González; Spain	Emils Dzilna; Latvia	Saman Pakbaz; Iran
F20	Muhammad Ziyad Zolkefli; Malaysia	Soane Luka Meissonnier; France	Jordi Patricio Congo Villalba; Ecuador
F32	Aleksei Churkin; Neutral Paralympic Athletes (NPA)	Athanasios Konstantinidis; Greece	Dimitrios Zisidis; Greece
F33	Cai Bingchen; China	Liu Li; China	Zakariae Derhem; Morocco
F34	Ahmad Hindi; Jordan	Azeddine Nouiri; Morocco	Nikita Dubenchuk; Neutral Paralympic Athletes (NPA)
F35	Khusniddin Norbekov; Uzbekistan	Seyed Aliasghar Javanmardi; Iran	Fu Xinhan; China
F36	Yassine Guenichi; Tunisia	Alan Kokoity; Neutral Paralympic Athletes (NPA)	Vladimir Sviridov; Neutral Paralympic Athletes (NPA)
F37	Kudratillokhon Marufkhujaev; Uzbekistan	Albert Khinchagov; Neutral Paralympic Athletes (NPA)	Ahmed Ben Moslah; Tunisia
F38	José Lemos; Colombia	Lazhar Ziamni; Algeria	not awarded
F40	Denis Gnezdilov; Neutral Paralympic Athletes (NPA)	Miguel Monteiro; Portugal	Garrah Tnaiash; Iraq
F41	Niko Kappel; Germany	Bobirjon Omonov; Uzbekistan	Huang Jun; China
F46	Sachin Sarjerao Khilari; India	Greg Stewart; Canada	Luka Baković; Croatia
F53	Giga Ochkhikidze; Georgia	Abdelillah Gani; Morocco	Alireza Mokhtari; Iran
F55	Ruzhdi Ruzhdi; Bulgaria	Nebojša Đurić; Serbia	Zamir Shkakhov; Neutral Paralympic Athletes (NPA)
F57	Yasin Khosravi; Iran	Thiago Paulino dos Santos; Brazil	Teijo Kööpikkä; Finland
F63	Aled Davies; Great Britain	Faisal Sorour; Kuwait	Palitha Halgahawela; Sri Lanka
