= 2023 World Para Athletics Championships – Men's shot put =

The men's shot put events at the 2023 World Para Athletics Championships were held at Charlety Stadium, Paris, France, from 10 to 17 July.

== Medalists ==
Event	Gold	Silver	Bronze
F11	Mahdi Olad; Iran	Alessandro Da Silva; Brazil	Álvaro del Amo Cano; Spain
F12	Roman Danyliuk; Ukraine	Volodymyr Ponomarenko; Ukraine	Elbek Sultonov; Uzbekistan
F20	Maksym Koval; Ukraine	Muhammad Ziyad Zolkefli; Malaysia	Oleksandr Yarovyi; Ukraine
F32	Liu Li; China	Bo Qing; China	Athanasios Konstantinidis; Greece
F33	Zakariae Derhem; Morocco	Giuseppe Campoccio; Italy	Deni Černi; Croatia
F34	Ahmad Hindi; Jordan	Mauricio Valencia; Colombia	Hadi Kaeidi; Iran
F35	Khusniddin Norbekov; Uzbekistan	Hernán Emanuel Urra; Argentina	Fu Xinhan; China
F36	Yassine Guenichi; Tunisia	José Román Ruiz; Mexico	Dastan Mukashbekov; Kazakhstan
F37	Ahmed Ben Moslah; Tunisia	Kudratillokhon Marufkhujaev; Uzbekistan	Tolibboy Yuldashev; Uzbekistan
F38	José Lemos; Colombia	Michael Jenkins; Great Britain	Faisal Sorour; Kuwait
F40	Yannis Fischer; Germany	Garrah Tnaiash; Iraq	Miguel Monteiro; Portugal
F41	Bobirjon Omonov; Uzbekistan	Niko Kappel; Germany	Hagan Landry; United States
F46	Sachin Sarjerao Khilari; India	Josh Cinnamo; United States	Kerwin Noemdo; South Africa
F53	Rashid Masjedi; Iran	Viktor Lehkodukh; Ukraine	Aleš Kisý; Czech Republic
F55	Ruzhdi Ruzhdi; Bulgaria	Lech Stoltman; Poland	Wallace Santos; Brazil
F57	Yasin Khosravi; Iran	Thiago Paulino dos Santos; Brazil	Teijo Kööpikkä; Finland
F63	Aled Davies; Great Britain	Sajad Mohammadian; Iran	Edenilson Roberto Floriani; Brazil

== Results ==
=== F11 ===
The event took place at 18:42 on 12 Jul 2023.

Rank	Athlete	Nation	Result	Notes
1st place, gold medalist(s)	Mahdi Olad	Iran	13.79	
2nd place, silver medalist(s)	Alessandro da Silva	Brazil	13.43	SB
3rd place, bronze medalist(s)	Alvaro del Amo Cano	Spain	12.81	PB
4	Miljenko Vucic	Croatia	12.58	SB
5	Maharram Gasimov	Azerbaijan	11.63	PB
6	Monu Ghangas	India	11.57	SB
7	Bil Marinkovic	Austria	11.47	
8	Miroslaw Madzia	Poland	11.41	
9	Milos Spaic	Montenegro	10.77	
10	Roger Saavedra	Panama	10.22	
11	Juan Carlos Caballero	Panama	9.93	
12	Petteri Peitso	Finland	9.78	
13	Luc Yomby Kifie	Cameroon	8.99	
14	Yuh Ndim Clement	Cameroon	8.94	
15	Evgheni Iagudin	Moldova	8.1	SB
	Rajab Chetty	Kenya	DNS	

=== F12 ===
The event took place on 10 July.

Rank	Athlete	Result	Notes
1st place, gold medalist(s)	Roman Danyliuk (UKR)	16.73	CR
2nd place, silver medalist(s)	Volodymyr Ponomarenko (UKR)	15.92	PB
3rd place, bronze medalist(s)	Elbek Sultonov (UZB)	15.42	SB
4	Stefan Dimitrijevic (SRB)	13.88	
5	Kim Lopez Gonzalez (ESP)	13.58	SB
6	Devin Huhta (USA)	13.42	
7	Emils Dzilna (LAT)	13.40	
8	Petre Prundaru (ROU)	12.46	
9	Vladimir Butucea (MDA)	10.36	
—	Marek Wietecki (POL)	DNF	

=== F20 ===
The event took place at 18:34 on 13 Jul 2023.

Rank	Athlete	Nation	Result	Notes
1st place, gold medalist(s)	Maksym Koval	Ukraine	17.57	WR
2nd place, silver medalist(s)	Muhammad Ziyad Zolkefli	Malaysia	17.21	SB
3rd place, bronze medalist(s)	Oleksandr Yarovyi	Ukraine	16.99	SB
4	Efstratios Nikolaidis	Greece	16.01	SB
5	Soane Luka Meissonnier	France	15.68	PB
6	Jordi Congo	Ecuador	15.54	
7	Stalin Mosquera	Ecuador	14.36	
8	Leontios Stefanidis	Greece	14.3	SB
9	Istvan Szollosi	Hungary	13.6	
10	Roger Saavedra	Panama	10.22	

=== F32 ===
The event took place at 18:30 on 13 Jul 2023.

Rank	Athlete	Nation	Result	Notes
1st place, gold medalist(s)	Liu Li	China	13.01	WR
2nd place, silver medalist(s)	Qing Bo	China	12.17	PB
3rd place, bronze medalist(s)	Athanasios Konstantinidis	Greece	10.26	
4	Lahouari Bahlaz	Algeria	10.07	SB
5	Mohamed Amchi	Algeria	9.42	
6	Walid Ferhah	Algeria	8.93	
7	Dimitrios Zisidis	Greece	8.9	
8	Maciej Sochal	Poland	8.51	
9	Mohammed Al Mashaykhi	Oman	7.89	SB
10	Genadij Zametaskin	Lithuania	6.06	

=== F33 ===
The event took place at 17:30 on 17 Jul 2023.

Rank	Athlete	Nation	Result	Notes
1st place, gold medalist(s)	Zakariae Derhem	Morocco	11.91	AR
2nd place, silver medalist(s)	Giuseppe Campoccio	Italy	11.42	SB
3rd place, bronze medalist(s)	Deni Cerni	Croatia	11.08	SB
4	Kamel Kardjena	Algeria	10.55	
5	Hani Alnakhli	Saudi Arabia	10.35	
6	Michal Glab	Poland	9.65	
7	Ahmed Alhosani	United Arab Emirates	9.31	
8	Lazaros Stefanidis	Greece	9.27	
9	Gertrudis Ortega Campos	Panama	8.74	AR
10	Ambrus Nagy	Hungary	7.22	
11	Devershee Sachan	India	6.69	SB

=== F34 ===
The event took place at 9:04 on 17 Jul 2023.

Rank	Athlete	Nation	Result	Notes
1st place, gold medalist(s)	Ahmad Hindi	Jordan	11.69	SB
2nd place, silver medalist(s)	Mauricio Valencia	Colombia	11.68	AR
3rd place, bronze medalist(s)	Hadi Kaeidi	Iran	11.35	
4	Azeddine Nouiri	Morocco	10.94	SB
5	Diego Meneses	Colombia	10.66	
6	Saeid Afrooz	Iran	10.65	SB
7	Abdulrahman Fiqi	Qatar	10.44	SB
8	Tomasz Paulinski	Poland	10.22	SB
9	Muhsin Kaedi	Turkey	10.18	
10	Mohammed Hendi	Iraq	10.02	PB
11	Oleksandr Aliekseienko	Israel	9.88	
12	Louis Gervais Baha	Cameroon	8.95	
13	Yair Mordechai Nizar	Israel	8.64	

=== F35 ===
The event took place at 19:12 on 15 Jul 2023.

Rank	Athlete	Nation	Result	Notes
1st place, gold medalist(s)	Khusniddin Norbekov	Uzbekistan	16.78	SB
2nd place, silver medalist(s)	Emanuel Urra Hernan	Argentina	15.55	SB
3rd place, bronze medalist(s)	Xinhan Fu	China	15.33	
4	Aliasghar Javanmardi Seyed	Iran	15.09	
5	Edgars Bergs	Latvia	14.09	SB
6	Arvind	India	13.43	
7	Naser Faraj	Kuwait	10.08	PB
8	Andrei Valentir	Moldova	7.89	SB

=== F36 ===
The event took place at 9:42 on 13 Jul 2023.

Rank	Athlete	Nation	Result	Notes
1st place, gold medalist(s)	Yassine Guenichi	Tunisia	16.86	WR
2nd place, silver medalist(s)	Jose Roman Ruiz	Mexico	15.82	AR
3rd place, bronze medalist(s)	Dastan Mukashbekov	Kazakhstan	15.74	AR
4	Sebastian Dietz	Germany	14.44	
5	Rufat Rafiyev	Azerbaijan	14.12	PB
6	Mykola Dibrova	Ukraine	14.03	SB
7	Mohammed Al Kaabi	United Arab Emirates	12.61	
8	Shakhboz Rajabov	Uzbekistan	12.33	PB
9	Simonas Strelkauskis	Lithuania	11.47	PB

=== F37 ===
The event took place on 10 July.

Rank	Athlete	Result	Notes
1st place, gold medalist(s)	Ahmed Ben Moslah (TUN)	15.59	AR
2nd place, silver medalist(s)	Kudratillokhon Marufkhujaev (UZB)	14.69	PB
3rd place, bronze medalist(s)	Tolibboy Yuldashev (UZB)	14.62	PB
4	Jakub Miroslaw (POL)	14.19	
5	Bryan Leonel Enriquez (MEX)	14.10	
6	Mykola Zhabnyak (UKR)	13.88	
7	Donatas Dundzys (LTU)	13.63	SB
8	Emanoel Souza (BRA)	13.45	
9	Tomasz Sciubak (POL)	13.17	SB
10	Joao Teixeira (BRA)	12.55	
11	Dmitrijs Silovs (LAT)	11.33	SB
12	David Bambrick (CAN)	10.32	

=== F38 ===
The event took place at 19:30 on 16 Jul 2023.

Rank	Athlete	Result	Notes
1st place, gold medalist(s)	José Lemos (COL)	18.26	WR
2nd place, silver medalist(s)	Michael Jenkins (GBR)	17.14	AR
3rd place, bronze medalist(s)	Faisal Sorour (KUW)	17.01	AR
4	Cameron Crombie (AUS)	15.89	SB
5	Oleksandr Doroshenko (UKR)	15.27	=PB
6	Vladyslav Bilyi (UKR)	14.99	PB
7	Marty Jackson (AUS)	14.74	SB

=== F40 ===
The event took place at 9:30 on 11 Jul 2023.

Rank	Athlete	Result	Notes
1st place, gold medalist(s)	Yannis Fischer (GER)	11.43	CR
2nd place, silver medalist(s)	Garrah Tnaiash (IRQ)	11.28	AR
3rd place, bronze medalist(s)	Miguel Monteiro (POR)	11.14	
4	Matija Sloup (CRO)	10.25	
5	Ravi Rongali (IND)	8.9	PB
6	Muhammad Diroy Noordin (SGP)	8.84	
7	Redouane Thabit (MAR)	8.72	
8	Andres Pinillo Pinto (ARG)	7.73	
9	Mert Kilic (TUR)	7.69	
10	Sergiu Bors (MDA)	5.21	SB

=== F41 ===
The event took place at 10:13 on 12 Jul 2023.

Rank	Athlete	Result	Notes
1	Bobirjon Omonov (UZB)	14.73	CR
2	Niko Kappel (GER)	14.49	SB
3	Hagan Landry (USA)	13.48	
4	Bartosz Tyszkowski (POL)	12.28	
5	Pengxiang Sun (CHN)	10.93	PB
6	Jisong Jung (KOR)	9.93	
7	Kamil Dobiecki (POL)	9.8	
8	Iosefo Rakesa (FIJ)	9.38	SB
—	Gurkan Uncuoglu (TUR)	DNS	

=== F46 ===
The event took place at 9:08 on 14 Jul 2023.

Rank	Athlete	Result	Notes
1	Sachin Sarjerao Khilari (IND)	16.21	AR
2	Joshua Cinnamo (USA)	16	SB
3	Kerwin Noemdo (RSA)	15.3	
4	Luka Bakovic (CRO)	15.2	=PB
5	Mathias Uwe Schulze (GER)	14.81	
6	Raivo Maksims (LAT)	13.47	PB
7	Andrius Skuja (LTU)	13.09	SB
8	Abdullah Alsaleh (KUW)	12.89	
9	Rasim Yakhin (AZE)	12.13	PB

=== F53 ===
The event took place on 11 July.

Rank	Athlete	Result	Notes
1st place, gold medalist(s)	Rashid Masjedi (IRN)	8.49	CR
2nd place, silver medalist(s)	Viktor Lehkodukh (UKR)	8.36	PB
3rd place, bronze medalist(s)	Aleš Kisý (CZE)	8.27	PB
4	Alireza Mokhtari (IRN)	8.26	
5	Bartosz Gorczak (POL)	8.14	
6	Abdelillah Gani (MAR)	7.67	AR
7	Marijan Presečan (CRO)	6.92	SB
8	Yaser Almosalem (KUW)	6.37	
	Erick Ortiz Monroy (MEX)	NM	

=== F55 ===
The event took place on 9 July.

Rank	Athlete	Result	Notes
1st place, gold medalist(s)	Ruzhdi Ruzhdi (BUL)	12.68	WR
2nd place, silver medalist(s)	Lech Stoltman (POL)	12.27	PB
3rd place, bronze medalist(s)	Wallace Santos (BRA)	11.87	
4	Olokhan Musayev (AZE)	11.74	SB
5	Nebojša Đurić (SRB)	11.62	SB
6	Damian Ligeza (POL)	11.23	SB
7	Hamed Amiri (IRI)	10.96	SB
8	Ramunas Verbavicius (LTU)	10.82	SB
9	Francisco Leonardo Cedeno Almengor (PAN)	10.14	
10	Ilias Nalmpantis (GRE)	10.07	
11	Sargis Stepanyan (ARM)	9.78	SB
12	Neeraj Yadav (IND)	9.29	

=== F57 ===
The event took place at 18:30 on 16 Jul 2023.

Rank	Athlete	Result	Notes
1	Yasin Khosravi (IRI)	16.01	WR
2	Thiago Paulino (BRA)	15.09	SB
3	Teijo Kööpikkä (FIN)	14.8	PB
4	Soman Rana (IND)	14.76	PB
5	Muhammet Khalvandi (TUR)	14.27	PB
6	Samir Nabiyev (AZE)	13.59	SB
7	Hotozhe Sema Hokato (IND)	13.4	
8	Vitolio Kavakava (FRA)	13.32	PB
9	Talla Diop (SEN)	13.06	AR
10	Reinoso Pablo Gimenez (ARG)	12.79	
11	Christian Escobar (COL)	12.79	
12	David Fernandez (ESP)	11.99	

=== F63 ===
The event took place at 18:00 on 17 Jul 2023.

Rank	Athlete	Result	Notes
1	Aled Davies (GBR)	16.16	
2	Sajad Mohammadian (IRI)	14.38	SB
3	Edenilson Roberto (BRA)	14.06	
4	Badr Touzi (FRA)	12.99	
5	Tyrone Pillay (RSA)	12.76	
6	Georg Schober (AUT)	12.56	PB
7	William Tchuisseu Tchapo (CMR)	11.92	SB
8	Fotios Ntimeris (GRE)	11.87	
