= 2021 World Para Athletics European Championships – Men's shot put =

The men's shot put events were held on each day of the 2021 World Para Athletics European Championships in Bydgoszcz, Poland.

== Medalists ==
Event	Gold		Silver		Bronze	
F11	Miljenko Vucic (CRO)	13.25	Igor Baskakov (RUS)	13.22 PB	Sergei Shatalov (RUS)	13.18
F12	Kim Lopez Gonzalez (ESP)	17.02 WR	Roman Danyliuk (UKR)	16.24 SB	Stefan Dimitrijevic (SRB)	12.91 PB
F20	Oleksandr Yarovyi (UKR)	16.77 CR	Maksym Koval (UKR)	16.62 SB	Efstratios Nikolaidis (GRE)	16.60
F32	Aleksei Churkin (RUS)	11.16 ER	Athanasios Konstantinidis (GRE)	9.82	Maciej Sochal (POL)	8.86
F33	Aleksandr Khrupin (RUS)	11.30 SB	Michal Glab (POL)	10.46 SB	Deni Černi (CRO)	10.42
F34	Evgenii Malykh (RUS)	11.00 =CR	Tomasz Paulinski (POL)	10.88 SB	Muhsin Kaedi (TUR)	10.86
F35	Edgars Bergs (LAT)	14.00	Alexander Elmin (RUS)	13.95	Nicki Russo (ITA)	13.12 PB
F36	Alan Kokoity (RUS)	15.92 CR	Vladimir Sviridov (RUS)	15.71	Sebastian Dietz (GER)	14.50 SB
F37	Mykola Zhabnyak (UKR)	16.02 PB	Albert Khinchagov (RUS)	15.19	Donatas Dundzys (LTU)	14.85 PB
F40	Miguel Monteiro (POR)	10.92 CR	Dmitry Dushkin (RUS)	10.68	Yannis Fischer (GER)	9.77 SB
F41	Bartosz Tyszkowski (POL)	13.51 SB	Kyron Duke (GBR)	13.39	Niko Kappel (GER)	13.36
F46	Nikita Prokhorov (RUS)	15.18	Andrius Skuja (LTU)	15.01 PB	Mathias Schulze (GER)	14.79
F53	Elvin Astanov (AZE)	8.23 PB	Bartosz Gorczak (POL)	7.77 PB	Ales Kisy (CZE)	7.58
F55	Ruzhdi Ruzhdi (BUL)	12.27 CR	Lech Stoltman (POL)	12.07 SB	Nebojša Đurić (SRB)	11.80 SB
F57	Janusz Rokicki (POL)	13.90 SB	Alexey Ashapatov (RUS)	13.79 SB	Piotr Kakol (POL)	12.95 PB
F63	Aled Davies (GBR)	15.17	Tom Habscheid (LUX)	14.53 CR	Badr Touzi (FRA)	13.53 PB
WR world record | ER European record | CR championship record | NR national record | WL world leading | EL European leading | PB personal best | SB seasonal best

== See also ==
- List of IPC world records in athletics
