= Miguel Monteiro (athlete) =

Portuguese Paralympic athlete

Personal information
- Nationality: Portuguese
- Born: 23 December 2000 (age 25) Viseu, Portugal

Sport
- Country: Portugal
- Sport: Para-athletics
- Disability: Achondroplasia
- Disability class: F40
- Event: Shot put
- Club: Casa do Povo de Mangualde
- Turned pro: 2016
- Coached by: Joao Amaral Mendes
Medal record
Representing Portugal
Para-athletics
Paralympic Games
Gold medal – first place	2024 Paris	Shot put F40
Bronze medal – third place	2020 Tokyo	Shot put F40
World Championships
Silver medal – second place	2017 London	Shot put F40
Silver medal – second place	2024 Kobe	Shot put F40
Silver medal – second place	2025 New Delhi	Shot put F40
Bronze medal – third place	2023 Paris	Shot put F40
European Championships
Gold medal – first place	2021 Bydgoszcz	Shot put F40

Miguel Monteiro (born 23 December 2000) is a Portuguese Para-athlete specializing in shot put. He represented Portugal at the Paralympic Games.

== Career ==
Monteiro represented Portugal in the shot put F40 event at the 2020 Summer Paralympics and won a bronze medal.

He qualified for the 2024 Summer Paralympics by winning a bronze medal in the shot put F40 event. At the 2024 Summer Paralympics, he won a gold medal in the shot put F40 event.
