= Maksym Koval =

Maksym Koval may refer:

- Maksym Koval (footballer), Ukrainian football goalkeeper
- Maksym Koval (athlete), Ukrainian Paralympic athlete

== See also ==
- Maksym Kowal, Canadian soccer player
