= Teijo Kööpikkä =

Finnish para athlete (born 1980)

Personal information
- Nationality: Finnish
- Born: 7 October 1980 (age 45)

Sport
- Sport: Para-athletics
- Disability: Spinal muscular atrophy
- Disability class: F57
- Event: shot put
Medal record
Men's para athletics
Representing Finland
World Championships
Bronze medal – third place	2023 Paris	Shot put F57
Bronze medal – third place	2024 Kobe	Shot put F57
Bronze medal – third place	2025 New Delhi	Shot put F57

Teijo Kööpikkä (born 7 October 1980) is a Finnish para athlete specializing in shot put. He represented Finland at the 2024 Summer Paralympics.

== Career ==
Kööpikkä made his World Championships debut at the 2023 World Para Athletics Championships and won a bronze medal in the shot put F57 event with a personal best throw of 14.8 metres.

In May 2024, he competed at the 2024 World Para Athletics Championships and won a bronze medal in the shot put F57 event. In September 2024, he represented Finland at the 2024 Summer Paralympics and finished in fourth place in the shot put F57 event with a throw of 14.18 metres.

Kööpikkä competed at the 2025 World Para Athletics Championships and won a bronze medal in the shot put F57 event. He was originally in fourth place, but protests were made about the competition. The three longest throws of Brazil's Thiago Paulino dos Santos, who was second on the results list, were disallowed, which dropped him to fifth place, and as a result promoted Kööpikkä to third.

== Personal life ==
Kööpikkä was diagnosed with spinal muscular atrophy in 2005. He is married and has two sons.
