= Kokoity =

Kokoity is a surname. Notable people with the surname include:

- Alan Kokoity (born 1988), Russian para-athlete
- Eduard Kokoity (born 1964), Ossetian politician
