= Athletics at the 2024 Summer Paralympics – Men's shot put F41 =

Men's shot put F41 at the XVII Paralympic Games
- Venue: Stade de France, Paris
- Date: 2 September 2024
- Competitors: 7 from 5 nations

Medalists
1st place, gold medalist(s)		Bobirjon Omonov	Uzbekistan
2nd place, silver medalist(s)		Niko Kappel	Germany
3rd place, bronze medalist(s)		Huang Jun	China

The Athletics at the 2024 Summer Paralympics – Men's shot put F41 event at the 2024 Summer Paralympics in Paris, took place on 2 September 2024.

== Classification ==
The F41 classification is for athletes of short stature.

== Records ==
Prior to the competition, the existing records were as follows:

World Record	Niko Kappel (GER)	15.07m	(Germany) Hechingen	9 May 2024
Paralympic Record	Bobirjon Omonov (UZB)	14.06m	(Japan) Tokyo	30 August 2021

== Results ==
=== Final ===
The final in this classification took place on 2 September 2024:

Rank	Athlete	Nationality	Class	1	2	3	4	5	6	Best	Notes
1st place, gold medalist(s)	Bobirjon Omonov	Uzbekistan	F41	13.55	14.32	13.33	13.23	13.99	x	14.32	PR
2nd place, silver medalist(s)	Niko Kappel	Germany	F41	13.74	13.29	13.58	x	x	x	13.74	
3rd place, bronze medalist(s)	Huang Jun	China	F41	11.20	11.27	x	x	11.54	11.66	11.66	PB
4	Xia Zhiwei	China	F41	11.55	11.40	11.46	11.09	11.52	11.57	11.57	SB
5	Jung Jisong	South Korea	F41	10.72	x	10.08	10.07	9.55	10.46	10.72	
6	Kah Michel Ye	Ivory Coast	F41	10.42	10.30	9.88	10.34	10.39	10.46	10.46	PB
7	Sun Pengxiang	China	F41	10.37	10.11	9.94	10.14	x	x	10.37	
