= Elbek =

Elbek is an Uzbek masculine given name. Notable people with the name include:

- Elbek Sultonov (born 1995), Uzbek Paralympic athlete
- Elbek Tazhyieu (born 1986), Belarusian Greco-Roman wrestler

Elbek Mashrapov(born 2011), Uzbek student
