= Kudratillokhon Marufkhujaev =

Uzbekistani Paralympic athlete (born 1999)

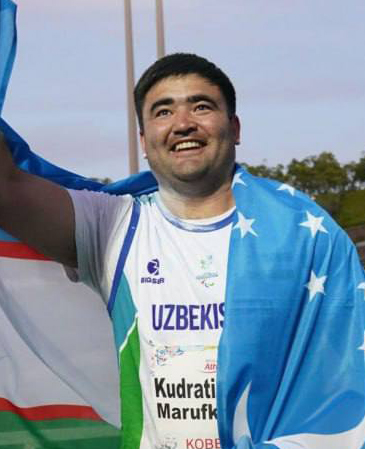

Personal information
- Nationality: Uzbekistani
- Born: 22 December 1999 (age 26) Uzbekistan

Sport
- Sport: Para-athletics
- Disability class: F37
- Event(s): shot put discus throw
Medal record
Para-athletics
Representing Uzbekistan
Paralympic Games
Gold medal – first place	2024 Paris	Shot put
World Championships
Gold medal – first place	2024 Kobe	Discus throw
Gold medal – first place	2024 Kobe	Shot put
Silver medal – second place	2023 Paris	Shot put
Asian Para Games
Gold medal – first place	2022 Hangzhou	Shot put

Kudratillokhon Marufkhujaev (born 22 December 1999) is an Uzbekistani para-athlete, competing in F37 throwing events: shot put and discus throw. He represented Uzbekistan at the 2024 Summer Paralympics, winning a gold medal.

== Career ==
Marufkhujaev represented Uzbekistan 2023 World Para Athletics Championships and won a silver medal in the shot put event. Three months later, at the rescheduled 2022 Asian Games, he won the gold medal in shot put. He again represented Uzbekistan at the 2024 World Para Athletics Championships and won a gold medal in the shot put and discus throw events.

Marufkhujaev represented Uzbekistan at the 2024 Summer Paralympics and won a gold medal in the shot put event.
