= Cai Bingchen =

Chinese Paralympic athlete (born 2001)

Personal information
- Nationality: Chinese
- Born: 5 February 2001 (age 25) Nanjing, China

Sport
- Sport: Para-athletics
- Disability class: F33
- Events: shot put javelin throw
Medal record
Men's para-athletics
Representing China
Paralympic Games
Gold medal – first place	2024 Paris	Shot put F33
World Championships
Gold medal – first place	2024 Kobe	Shot put F33
Asian Para Games
Gold medal – first place	2022 Hangzhou	Shot put F33
Bronze medal – third place	2022 Hangzhou	Javelin throw F33/34

Cai Bingchen (born 5 February 2001) is a Chinese para-athlete specializing in throwing events: shot put and javelin throw. He represented China at the 2024 Summer Paralympics.

== Career ==
Cai competed at the 2022 Asian Para Games and won a gold medal in the shot put F33 event and a bronze medal in the javelin throw F33/34 event.

In May 2024, Cai competed at the 2024 World Para Athletics Championships and won a gold medal in the shot put F33 event. He then represented China at the 2024 Summer Paralympics and won a gold medal in the shot put F33 event.
