= Volodymyr Ponomarenko (athlete) =

Ukrainian Paralympic athlete (born 1992)

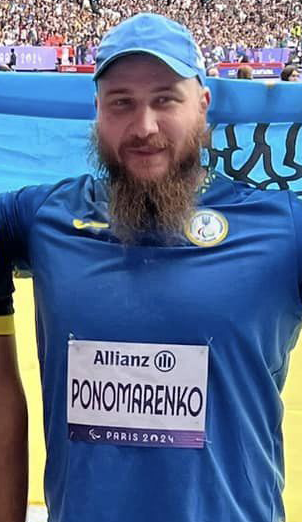
- Ponomarenko at the 2024 Summer Paralympics

Personal information
- Nationality: Ukrainian
- Born: 22 October 1992 (age 33) Poltava, Ukraine

Sport
- Sport: Para-athletics
- Disability class: F12
- Event: shot put
Medal record
Para-athletics
Representing Ukraine
Paralympic Games
Silver medal – second place	2024 Paris	Shot put F12
World Championships
Gold medal – first place	2025 New Delhi	Shot put F12
Silver medal – second place	2023 Paris	Shot put F12

Volodymyr Ponomarenko (born 22 October 1992) is a Ukrainian para-athlete, specializing in shot put.

== Career ==
Ponomarenko represented Ukraine at the 2023 World Para Athletics Championships and won a silver medal in the shot put F12 event.

Ponomarenko represented Ukraine at the 2024 Summer Paralympics and won a silver medal in the shot put F12 event.
