= Kuwait at the 2024 Summer Paralympics =

- IPC code: KUW
- NPC: Kuwait Paralympic Committee

in Paris, France August 28, 2024 – September 8, 2024
- Competitors: 2 in 1 sport
- Flag bearer: Faisal Sorour
- Medals Ranked 61st: Gold 1 Silver 0 Bronze 1 Total 2

Summer Paralympics appearances (overview)
- 1980; 1984; 1988; 1992; 1996; 2000; 2004; 2008; 2012; 2016; 2020; 2024

Kuwait competed at the 2024 Summer Paralympics in Paris, France, from 28 August to 8 September.

== Medalists ==
The following Kuwaiti competitors won medals at the games. In the discipline sections below, the medalists' names are bolded.

Medal	Name	Sport	Event	Date
Gold	Faisal Sorour	Athletics	Men's shot put F63	3 September
Bronze	Faisal Al-Rajehi	Athletics	Men's 5000 metres T54	31 August

Medals by sport
Sport	1st place, gold medalist(s)	2nd place, silver medalist(s)	3rd place, bronze medalist(s)	Total
Athletics	1	0	1	**2**
Total	1	0	1	2

Medals by day
Day	Date	1st place, gold medalist(s)	2nd place, silver medalist(s)	3rd place, bronze medalist(s)	Total
3	31 August	0	0	1	**1**
6	3 September	1	0	0	**1**
Total		1	0	1	2

Medals by gender
Gender	1st place, gold medalist(s)	2nd place, silver medalist(s)	3rd place, bronze medalist(s)	Total	Percentage
Male	1	0	1	**2**	100.0%
Total	1	0	1	2	100%

== Competitors ==
The following is the list of number of competitors in the Games.

Sport	Men	Women	Total
Athletics	2	0	2
Total	2	0	2

== Athletics ==
Kuwaiti track and field athletes achieved quota places for the following events based on their results at the 2023 World Championships, 2024 World Championships, or through high performance allocation, as long as they meet the minimum entry standard (MES).

Key

- Note–Ranks given for track events are within the athlete's heat only
- **Q** = Qualified for the next round
- **q** = Qualified for the next round as a fastest loser or, in field events, by position without achieving the qualifying target
- **DQ** = Disqualified
- **PR** = Paralympic Record
- **AR** = Area (or continental) Record
- **NR** = National Record
- **SB** = Season's Best
- N/A = Round not applicable for the event
- Bye = Athlete not required to compete in round

Track & road events

Athlete	Event	Heat		Final	
Athlete	Event	Result	Rank	Result	Rank
Faisal Al-Rajehi	Men's 5000 metres T54	11:18.74	5 **Q**		

Field events

Athlete	Event	Final	
Athlete	Event	Distance	Position
Dhari Buti	Men's shot put F37	12.66	10
Faisal Sorour	Men's shot put F63		Gold

== See also ==
- Kuwait at the 2024 Summer Olympics
- Kuwait at the Paralympics
