= Greg Stewart (athlete) =

Canadian para athletics competitor and former sitting volleyball player

Personal information
- Full name: Gregory Stewart
- Nationality: Canadian
- Born: July 13, 1986 (age 39) Victoria, British Columbia, Canada
- Height: 7 ft 2 in (218 cm)
- Weight: 350 lb (159 kg)

Sport
- Sport: Para athletics
- Disability class: F46
- Event: Shot put
- Club: Kamloops Track and Field Club
- Coached by: Dylan Armstrong
Medal record
Men's para athletics
Representing Canada
Paralympic Games
Gold medal – first place	2020 Tokyo	Shot put F46
Gold medal – first place	2024 Paris	Shot put F46
World Championships
Gold medal – first place	2025 New Delhi	Shot put F46
Silver medal – second place	2019 Dubai	Shot put F46
Silver medal – second place	2024 Kobe	Shot put F46
Parapan American Games
Silver medal – second place	2019 Lima	Shot put F46
Sitting volleyball
Parapan American Games
Bronze medal – third place	2007 Rio de Janeiro	Sitting volleyball
Bronze medal – third place	2011 Guadalajara	Sitting volleyball

Gregory Stewart (born July 13, 1986) is a Canadian para athlete who specializes in shot put. He represented Canada at the 2020 and 2024 Summer Paralympics.

== Career ==
Stewart had a successful career in sitting volleyball before starting to train for shot put. In 2007 and 2011 Stewart received a bronze medal in the Parapan American Games for sitting volleyball. In 2017 he began his shot put career. Soon after, he won an able-bodied shot put event in the Harry Jerome Classic in 2018. In this same year, he also came first in shot put for the Canadian Championships, World Para Athletics Challenge, and the Desert Challenge Games.

Stewart represented Canada at the 2019 Parapan American Games where he overcame a back injury and won a silver medal in the shot put F46 event with a Canadian record of 16.30-metres. He also represented Canada at the 2019 World Para Athletics Championships and won a silver medal in the shot put F46 event.

He represented Canada at the 2020 Summer Paralympics in the shot put F46 event and won a gold medal with a Paralympic Games record of 16.75-metres. He represented Canada at the 2024 Summer Paralympics in the shot put F46 and again won a gold medal, with a season best throw of 16.38 metres.

He competed at the 2025 World Para Athletics Championships and won a gold medal in the shot put F46 event, with a throw of 16.68 metres.

== Personal life and education ==
In 1986, Stewart was born in Victoria, British Columbia, without the lower part of his left arm. He spent most of his life in his hometown Kamloops, British Columbia. In 2012 he obtained his Bachelor of Business Administration (BBA) degree from Thompson Rivers University (TRU). While attending TRU, he played for varsity basketball playing five seasons, where in his final season he won CIS defensive player of the year.

Stewart is also an empowerment coach and motivational speaker, using his experiences to give others advice.

Stewart is currently retired from competitive sport but is still an advocate for Canadian high-performance athletes. He is a representative on the board of directors for Athletics Canada as well as AthletesCAN. Stewart works for and owns a company in the automotive recycling business.
