= Muhammad Ziyad Zolkefli =

Malaysian Paralympic athlete

Muhammad Ziyad Zolkefli KMN SIS
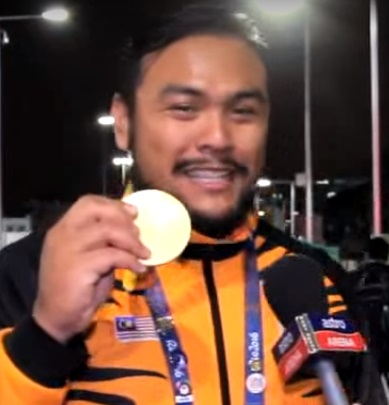
- Muhammad Ziyad in 2016

Personal information
- Nickname: Ziyad
- Nationality: Malaysian
- Born: Muhammad Ziyad bin Zolkefli; 15 March 1990 (age 36) Gombak, Selangor
- Height: 184 cm (6 ft 0 in)

Sport
- Country: Malaysia
- Sport: Track and field
- Disability class: (F20)
- Event: Shot put
- Club: Paralympic Club Kuala Lumpur
- Coached by: Mohd Faizol Harun (club)
Medal record
Men's athletics
Representing Malaysia
Southeast Asian Games
Silver medal – second place	2019 Philippines	Shot put
Bronze medal – third place	2017 Kuala Lumpur	Shot put
Bronze medal – third place	2021 Hanoi	Shot put
Bronze medal – third place	2023 Phnom Penh	Shot put
Men's para-athletics
Representing Malaysia
Paralympic Games
Gold medal – first place	2016 Rio de Janeiro	Shot put – F20
Silver medal – second place	2024 Paris	Shot put – F20
Bronze medal – third place	2012 London	Shot put – F20
World Championships
Gold medal – first place	2013 Lyon	Shot put – F20
Gold medal – first place	2017 London	Shot put – F20
Gold medal – first place	2024 Kobe	Shot put – F20
Silver medal – second place	2019 Dubai	Shot put – F20
Silver medal – second place	2023 Paris	Shot put – F20
Bronze medal – third place	2015 Doha	Shot put – F20
Bronze medal – third place	2025 New Delhi	Shot put – F20
Asian Para Games
Gold medal – first place	2014 Incheon	Shot put – F20
Gold medal – first place	2018 Jakarta	Shot put – F20
Gold medal – first place	2022 Hangzhou	Shot put – F20
ASEAN Para Games
Gold medal – first place	2014 Naypyidaw	Shot put – F20
Gold medal – first place	2015 Singapore	Shot put – F20
Gold medal – first place	2017 Kuala Lumpur	Shot put – F20
Gold medal – first place	2022 Surakarta	Shot put – F20

Muhammad Ziyad bin Zolkefli KMN (born 15 March 1990) is a Malaysian Paralympic athlete who competes in T20 classification shot put events. He has represented Malaysia in multiple Paralympics, World Championships and regional games, previously holding the world record in his division.

== Early life ==
Born in Selangor, Muhammad Ziyad was diagnosed with an intellectual impairment in preschool. He attended Sekolah Menengah Teknik Tanah Merah in Kelantan, and was involved in school sports. Before joining the Malaysian National Sports Council, he sold kueh teow on Jalan Tunku Abdul Rahman in Kuala Lumpur. He is the eldest of four siblings.

== Athletics career ==
Muhammad Ziyad first came to prominence at the 2012 London Paralympic Games, winning the bronze medal with a throw of 15.21m in the men's F20 shot put event. He won Malaysia's only gold medal at the 2013 World Para Athletics Championships in Lyon, and was recognised for his achievements as the National Paralympian Sportsman of the Year at the Anugerah Sukan Negara.

At the 2016 Rio Paralympic Games, Muhammad Ziyad again represented Malaysia and won the gold medal in the shot put event, setting a new world record of 16.84m. At the world championships in London the following year, he surpassed himself to again set the world record, throwing a distance of 17.29m.

He won silver at the 2024 Paralympic held in Paris with a record of 17.18m.

=== 2020 Tokyo Summer Paralympic Games ===
At the 2020 Tokyo Paralympic Games, Muhammad Ziyad represented Malaysia and won the gold medal in the shot put event, again breaking the world record with a 17.94 m throw during his third round in the final. He had initially arrived at the call room three minutes past his allocated time, but was allowed to compete. However, following an appeal from the Ukrainian team, both he and two other competitors were disqualified, invalidating the record. The ruling was upheld despite the athletes arguing that they did not recognise the relevant announcement as it was in a language they did not understand. Following his disqualification, Ukraine's Maksym Koval was awarded the gold medal and the world record. The decision was met with outcry, particularly from Malaysians. The hashtag #Ziyad trended on Twitter, with anger directed towards Koval and the IPC.

== Honours ==
=== Honours of Malaysia ===
- Malaysia
  - Officer of the Order of the Defender of the Realm (KMN) (2017)
- Selangor
  - Companion of the Order of Sultan Sharafuddin Idris Shah (SIS) (2012)

== See also ==
- List of IPC world records in athletics
