= Amirhossein Alipour Darbeid =

Iranian Paralympic athlete (born 2002)

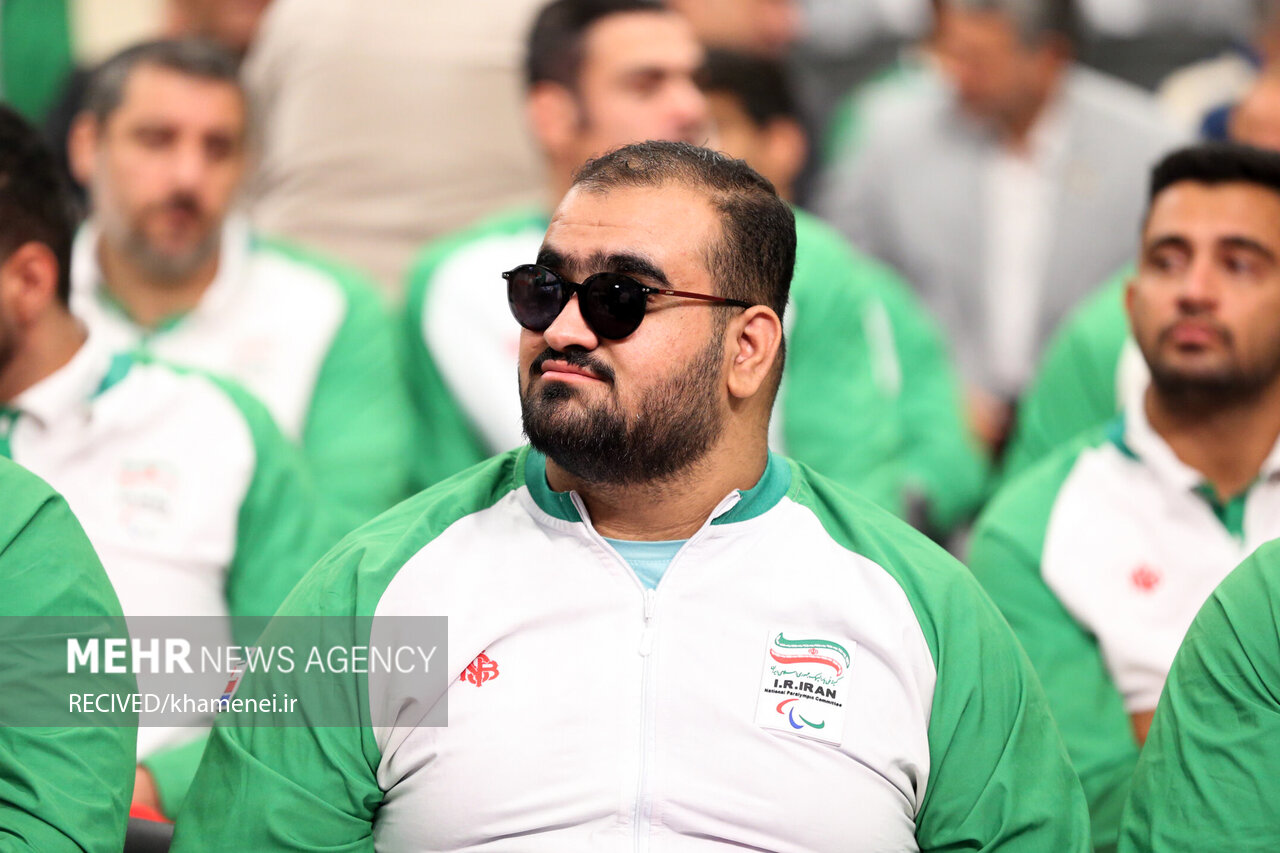
- Darbeid in 2024

Personal information
- Nationality: Iranian
- Born: 2 March 2002 (age 24)

Sport
- Sport: Para-athletics
- Disability class: F11
- Event: shot put
Medal record
Men's para-athletics
Representing Iran
Paralympic Games
Gold medal – first place	2024 Paris	Shot put F11
World Championships
Gold medal – first place	2024 Kobe	Shot put F11
Gold medal – first place	2025 New Delhi	Shot put F11

Amirhossein Alipour Darbeid (born 2 March 2002) is an Iranian para-athlete specializing in shot put.

== Career ==
In May 2024, Alipour Darbeid represented Iran at the 2024 World Para Athletics Championships and won a gold medal in the shot put F11 event. He then represented Iran at the 2024 Summer Paralympics and won a gold medal in the shot put F11 event.
