= Zafar Zaker =

Iranian Paralympic athlete (born 1990)

Personal information
- Nationality: Iranian
- Born: 6 February 1990 (age 36)

Sport
- Sport: Para-athletics
- Disability class: F55
- Event(s): shot put javelin throw
Medal record
Para-athletics
Representing Iran
Paralympic Games
Silver medal – second place	2024 Paris	Shot put F55
Asian Para Games
Silver medal – second place	2022 Hangzhou	Shot put F55
Silver medal – second place	2022 Hangzhou	Javelin throw F55

Zafar Zaker (born 6 February 1990) is an Iranian para-athlete competing in throwing events: shot put and javelin throw. He represented Iran at the 2024 Summer Paralympics.

== Career ==
Zaker represented Iran at the 2022 Asian Para Games and won silver medals in the shot put and javelin throw F32 events.

He represented Iran at the 2024 Summer Paralympics and won a silver medal in the shot put F55 event.
