= Tsegmidiin Battulga =

Mongolian Paralympic athlete

Personal information
- Nationality: Mongolia
- Born: Цэгмидийн Баттулга; 22 April 1991 (age 35) Bulgan, Mongolia

Sport
- Country: Mongolia
- Sport: Para-athletics
- Disability: short stature (achondroplasia)
- Disability class: F40
- Event: Shot put
Medal record
Men's Shot put
Representing Mongolia
Paralympic Games
Silver medal – second place	2024 Paris	Shot put F40
Asian Para Games
Bronze medal – third place	2022 Hangzhou	Shot put F40

Tsegmidiin Battulga (Mongolian: Цэгмидийн Баттулга; born 22 April 1991) is a Mongolian Paralympic athlete specializing in shot put. He represented Mongolia at the 2024 Paralympic Games, becoming the first ever Mongolian para-athlete to win a medal.

Battulga works as a dentist at Bulgan Aimag Central Hospital in Bulgan, Mongolia. His father Tsegmid was a notable Mongolian wrestler who twice became the Bulgan Province champion.

== Career ==
In October 2023, at the rescheduled 2022 Asian Games, Battulga won the bronze medal in shot put.

He represented Mongolia at the 2024 Summer Paralympics and won a silver medal in the shot put event.
