= Yasin Khosravi =

Iranian Paralympic athlete (born 1992)

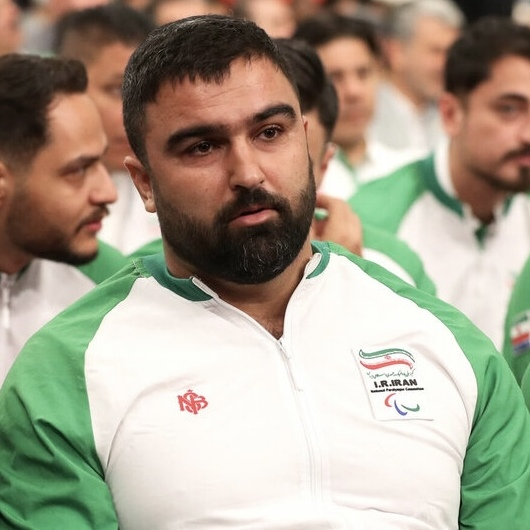
- Khosravi in 2024

Personal information
- Nationality: Iranian
- Born: 23 September 1992 (age 34)

Sport
- Sport: Para-athletics
- Disability class: F57
- Event: shot put
Medal record
Men's para-athletics
Representing Iran
Paralympic Games
Gold medal – first place	2024 Paris	Shot put F57
World Championships
Gold medal – first place	2023 Paris	Shot put F57
Gold medal – first place	2024 Kobe	Shot put F57
Gold medal – first place	2025 New Delhi	Shot put F57
Asian Para Games
Gold medal – first place	2022 Hangzhou	Shot put F57
Gold medal – first place	2026 Aichi–Nagoya	Shot put F57
Islamic Solidarity Games
Gold medal – first place	2025 Riyadh	Shot put F57

Yasin Khosravi (born 23 September 1992) is an Iranian para-athlete specializing in shot put. He represented Iran at the 2024 Summer Paralympics. He is a gold medalist at the Paralympic Games, Asian Para Games and Islamic Solidarity Games, and a three-time World Champion.

== Career ==
Khosravi made his World Para Athletics Championships at the 2023 World Para Athletics Championships and won a gold medal in the shot put F57 event with a world record throw of 16.01 metres. In October 2023, he competed at the 2022 Asian Para Games, which was postponed due to the COVID-19 pandemic, and won a gold medal in the shot put F57 event with an Asian Para Games record throw of 16.00 metres.

In May 2024, he competed at the 2024 World Para Athletics Championships and won a gold medal in the shot put F57 event. He then represented Iran at the 2024 Summer Paralympics and won a gold medal in the shot put F57 event, with a Paralympic record throw of 15.96 metres.

In October 2025, he competed at the 2025 World Para Athletics Championships and won a gold medal in the shot put F57 event with a new world record throw of 16.60 metres. The next month he competed at the 2025 Islamic Solidarity Games and won a gold medal in the shot put F57 event with a throw of 15.65 metres.

In October 2026, he competed at the 2026 Asian Para Games and won a gold medal in the shot put F57 event with an Asian Para Games record throw of 15.25 metres.
