= Tolibboy Yuldashev =

Uzbekistani Paralympic athlete (born 2003)

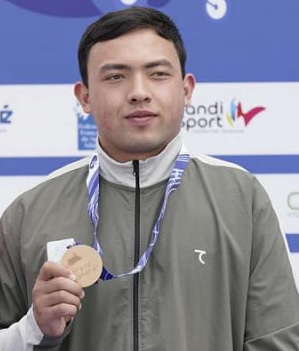

Personal information
- Nationality: Uzbekistani
- Born: 4 September 2003 (age 22)

Sport
- Sport: Para-athletics
- Disability class: F37
- Event: shot put
Medal record
Para-athletics
Representing Uzbekistan
Paralympic Games
Gold medal – first place	2024 Paris	Discus throw F37
Bronze medal – third place	2024 Paris	Shot put F37
World Championships
Bronze medal – third place	2023 Paris	Shot put F37
Bronze medal – third place	2025 New Delhi	Shot put F37
Asian Para Games
Silver medal – second place	2022 Hangzhou	Shot put F37

Tolibboy Yuldashev (born 4 September 2003) is an Uzbekistani para-athlete who specializes in shot put. He represented Uzbekistan at the 2024 Summer Paralympics.

== Career ==
Yuldashev represented Uzbekistan at the 2023 World Para Athletics Championships and won a bronze medal in the shot put F37 event.

He represented Uzbekistan at the 2024 Summer Paralympics and won a bronze medal in the shot put F37 event.
