= Deni Černi =

Croatian Paralympic athlete

Personal information
- Born: 3 May 1993 (age 33) Virovitica, Croatia

Sport
- Country: Croatia
- Sport: Para-athletics
- Disability class: F33
- Event: Shot put
Medal record
Paralympic Games
Silver medal – second place	2024 Paris	Shot put F33
Bronze medal – third place	2020 Tokyo	Shot put F33
World Championships
Gold medal – first place	2025 New Delhi	Shot put F33
Bronze medal – third place	2023 Paris	Shot put F33
European Championships
Silver medal – second place	2018 Berlin	Shot put F33
Bronze medal – third place	2021 Bydgoszcz	Shot put F33

Deni Černi (born 3 May 1993) is a Croatian Paralympic athlete.

== Career ==
He won the bronze medal in the men's shot put F33 event at the 2020 Summer Paralympics held in Tokyo, Japan.
