= Oleksandr Yarovyi =

Ukrainian Paralympic athlete (born 1999)

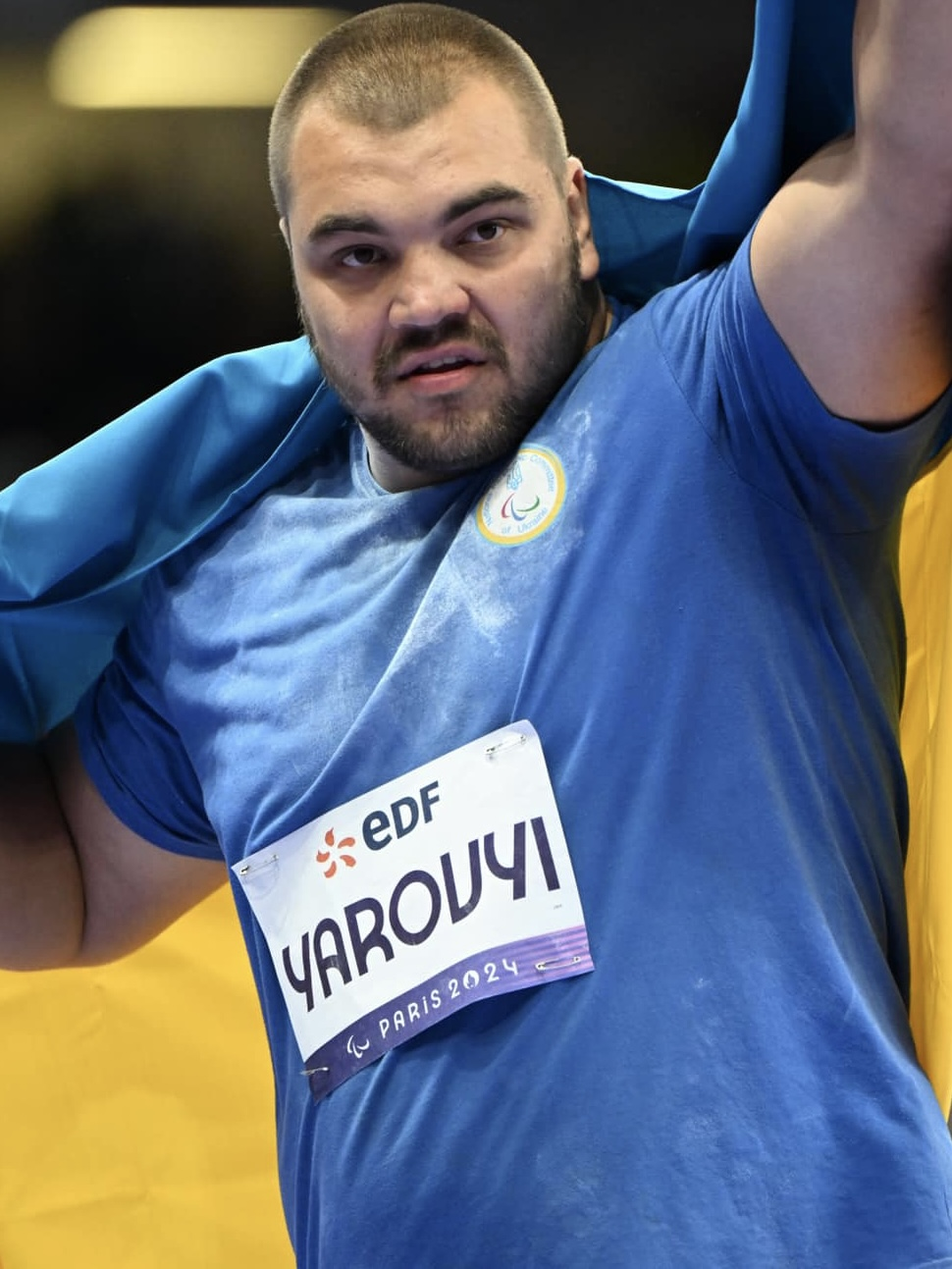
- Yarovyi at the 2024 Summer Paralympics

Personal information
- Nationality: Ukrainian
- Born: 27 June 1999 (age 27) Kremenchuk, Ukraine

Sport
- Sport: Para athletics
- Disability class: F20
- Event: shot put
- Club: Avanhard Complex Youth Sports School
- Coached by: Yury Shchypets
Medal record
Men's para-athletics
Representing Ukraine
Paralympic Games
Gold medal – first place	2024 Paris	Shot put F20
Silver medal – second place	2020 Tokyo	Shot put F20
World Championships
Gold medal – first place	2025 New Delhi	Shot put F20
Bronze medal – third place	2023 Paris	Shot put F20
European Championships
Gold medal – first place	2021 Bydgoszcz	Shot put F20

Oleksandr Yarovyi (born 27 June 1999) is a Ukrainian para athlete who specializes in shot put. He represented Ukraine at the 2020 Summer Paralympics.

== Career ==
Yarovyi represented Ukraine in the shot put F20 event at the 2020 Summer Paralympics and won a silver medal.
