= Erik Fabian Kaurin =

Croatian para-athlete (born 2000)

Personal information
- Born: 2 October 2000 (age 25) Kutina, Croatia

Sport
- Sport: Paralympic athletics

Erik Fabian Kaurin (born 2 October 2000) is a Croatian para-athlete, competing in shot put and discus throw. He is current holder of the F46 discus throw world record.

He competed at the F46 shot put event at the 2024 Summer Paralympics, finishing 7th (14.94 m).

Kaurin was born in Kutina, with oligodactyly of his right hand. He started practicing shot put at the persuasion of his friend Matija Sloup, also a para-athlete.

At the 2024 Cro Open in Pula, he set a new European record in the discus throw in his discipline (51.99 m). At the Dubai Grand Prix in February 2025, he set national record in the shot put (15.49 m), that qualified him for the World Championship in Kobe.
