= Yassine Guenichi =

Tunisian para athlete (born 1995)

Personal information
- Nationality: Tunisian
- Born: 3 April 1995 (age 31)

Sport
- Sport: Para athletics
- Disability class: F36
- Event: shot put
Medal record
Men's para-athletics
Representing Tunisia
Paralympic Games
Silver medal – second place	2020 Tokyo	Shot put F36
World Championships
Gold medal – first place	2023 Paris	Shot put F36
Gold medal – first place	2024 Kobe	Shot put F36
Silver medal – second place	2019 Dubai	Shot put F36
Silver medal – second place	2025 New Delhi	Shot put F36

Yassine Guenichi (born 3 April 1995) is a Tunisian para-athlete who specializes in shot put. He represented Tunisia at the 2020 Summer Paralympics.

== Career ==
Guenichi represented Tunisia in the men's shot put F36 event at the 2020 Summer Paralympics and won a silver medal.
