= Huang Jun (athlete) =

Chinese Paralympic athlete

Personal information
- Nationality: Chinese
- Born: 6 January 2002 (age 24)

Sport
- Sport: Para-athletics
- Disability class: F41
- Event: shot put
Medal record
Para-athletics
Representing China
Paralympic Games
Bronze medal – third place	2024 Paris	Shot put F41
World Championships
Bronze medal – third place	2024 Kobe	Shot put F41

Huang Jun (born 6 January 2002) is a Chinese para-athlete specializing in shot put. He represented China at the 2024 Summer Paralympics.

== Career ==
Huang represented China at the 2024 World Para Athletics Championships and won a bronze medal in the shot put F41 event. As a result, he qualified for the 2024 Summer Paralympics. A the 2024 Summer Paralympics he won a bronze medal in the shot put F41 event.
