= Lazaros Stefanidis =

Greek Paralympic athlete (born 1957)

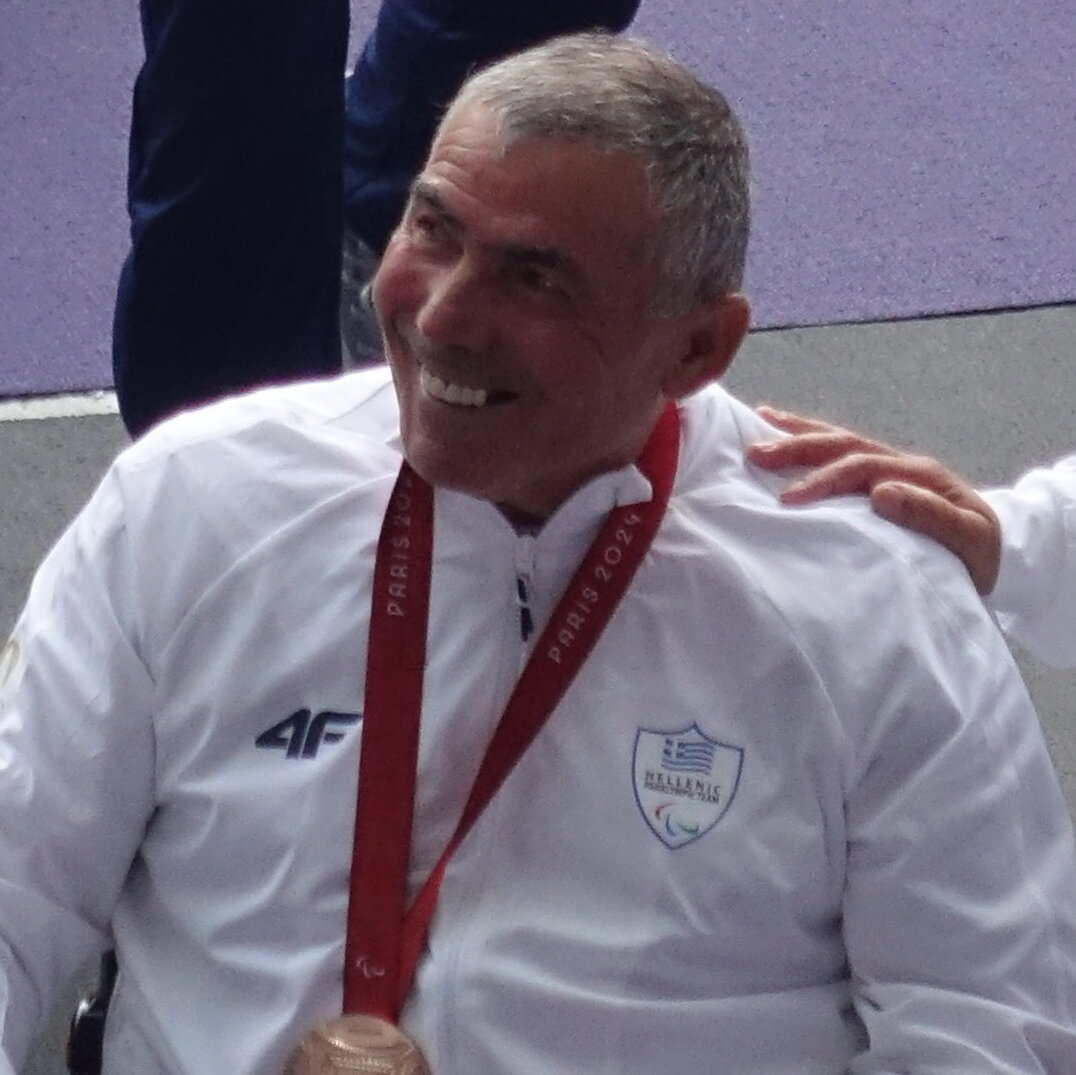
- Stefanidis at the 2024 Summer Paralympics

Personal information
- Nationality: Greek
- Born: 1 February 1957 (age 69)
- Home town: Thessaloniki, Greece

Sport
- Country: Greece
- Sport: Para-athletics
- Disability class: F32
- Event: Shot put
Medal record
Men's para-athletics
Representing Greece
Paralympic Games
Bronze medal – third place	2024 Paris	Shot put F32

Lazaros Stefanidis (born 1 February 1957) is a Greek para-athlete specializing in shot put.

== Career ==
Stefanidis represented Greece at the 2020 Summer Paralympics, along with his son Leontios. He again represented Greece at the 2024 Summer Paralympics and won a bronze medal in the shot put F32 event.
