= Emils Dzilna =

Latvian para athlete (born 2000)

Emīls Dzilna
Personal information
- Nationality: Latvian
- Born: 14 June 2000 (age 26)

Sport
- Sport: Para-athletics
- Disability class: F12
- Event: shot put
Medal record
Men's para-athletics
Representing Latvia
World Championships
| Silver medal – second place | 2024 Kobe | Shot put F12 |
| Silver medal – second place | 2025 New Delhi | Shot put F12 |

Emils Dzilna (born 14 June 2000) is a Latvian para-athlete specializing in shot put. He represented Latvia at the 2024 Summer Paralympics.

== Career ==
In May 2024, Dzilna competed at the 2024 World Para Athletics Championships and won a silver medal in the shot put F12 event. He then represented Latvia at the 2024 Summer Paralympics and finished in fifth place in the shot put F12 event. He competed at the 2025 World Para Athletics Championships and won a silver medal in the shot put F12 event.
