= Elbek Sultonov =

Uzbek Paralympic athlete (born 1995)

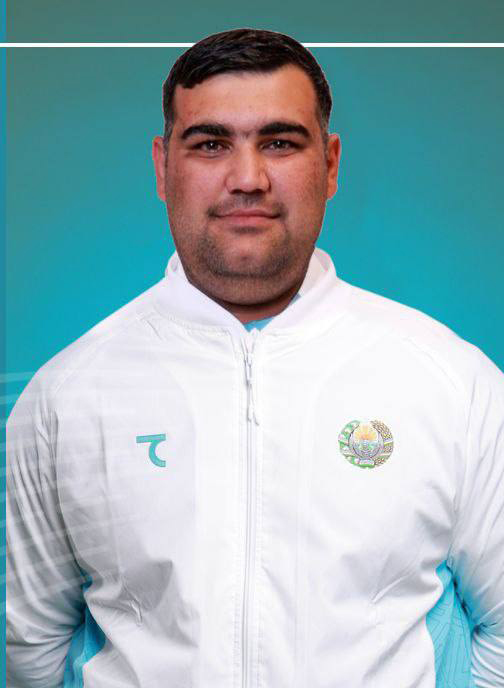

Personal information
- Nationality: Uzbekistani
- Born: 31 December 1995 (age 30) Navoiy, Uzbekistan

Sport
- Sport: Paralympic athletics
- Disability class: F12
- Events: shot put discus throw
- Coached by: Sardor Abdukholikov
Medal record
Men's para-athletics
Representing Uzbekistan
Paralympic Games
| Gold medal – first place | 2024 Paris | Shot put F12 |
| Bronze medal – third place | 2020 Tokyo | Shot put F12 |
World Championships
| Bronze medal – third place | 2019 Dubai | Shot put F12 |
| Bronze medal – third place | 2023 Paris | Shot put F12 |
Asian Para Games
| Gold medal – first place | 2018 Jakarta | Shot put F12 |
| Gold medal – first place | 2022 Hangzhou | Shot put F12 |
| Bronze medal – third place | 2018 Jakarta | Discus throw F12 |

Elbek Sultonov (born 31 December 1995) is a visually impaired Uzbekistani Paralympic track and field athlete, competing in throwing events: shot put and discus throw. He represented Uzbekistan at the 2020 Summer Paralympics.

== Career ==
Sultonov represented Uzbekistan in the men's shot put F12 event at the 2020 Summer Paralympics and won a bronze medal.
