= Aleš Kisý =

Czech Paralympic athlete

Personal information
- Nationality: Czech
- Born: 30 September 1980 (age 45) Trutnov

Sport
- Sport: Paralympic athletics
- Disability class: F53
- Event(s): shot put, discus throw, javelin throw, wheelchair rugby
Medal record
Men's para athletics
Representing Czech Republic
Paralympic Games
Bronze medal – third place	2020 Tokyo	Shot put F53
World Championships
Silver medal – second place	2025 New Delhi	Shot put F53
Bronze medal – third place	2023 Paris	Shot put F53
European Championships
Bronze medal – third place	2021 Bydgoszcz	Shot put F53

Aleš Kisý (born 30 September 1980) is a Czech Paralympic athlete. He has represented Czech Republic at the Paralympics on five occasions in 2004, 2008, 2012, 2016 and 2020.

== Biography ==
In August 1999, he met with a tragic incident as he slipped accidentally when he attempted to jump into a swimming pool and it ultimately resulted in quadriplegia. He also damaged his cervical spine.

== Career ==
Ales took up the sport of shot put in 2003. He was selected as one of the athletes to represent Czech Republic at the 2004 Summer Paralympics, just one year after taking the sport. During the 2004 Summer Paralympics, he competed in both discus throw and shot put events. He also competed in javelin throw event at the 2012 Summer Paralympics

He has also played wheelchair rugby at club level. He was named as the Czech Para athlete of the Year in 2018.

He clinched bronze medal at the age of 40 in the men's F53 shot put event during the 2020 Summer Paralympics. It was also his first Paralympic medal in five Paralympic attempts.
