= Ahmed Ben Moslah =

Tunisian para-athlete

Medal record

Para-athletics

Representing Tunisia

Paralympic Games
Silver medal – second place	2020 Tokyo	Shot put F37

World Championships
Gold medal – first place	2023 Paris	Shot put F37
Bronze medal – third place	2024 Kobe	Shot put F37

Ahmed Ben Moslah (born 6 January 1995) is a Tunisian para-athlete, who won silver in the shot put F37 event at the 2020 Summer Paralympics.
