= Dastan Mukashbekov =

Kazakhstani Paralympic athlete (born 1990)

Personal information
- Nationality: Kazakhstani
- Born: 31 May 1990 (age 36) Karaganda, Kazakhstan

Sport
- Sport: Para-athletics
- Disability class: F36
- Event: shot put
Medal record
Men's para-athletics
Representing Kazakhstan
Paralympic Games
| Bronze medal – third place | 2024 Paris | Shot put F36 |
World Championships
| Bronze medal – third place | 2023 Paris | Shot put F36 |
Asian Para Games
| Gold medal – first place | 2022 Hangzhou | Shot put F36 |

Dastan Mukashbekov (born 31 May 1990) is a Kazakhstani para-athlete specializing in shot put.

== Career ==
Mukashbekov competed at the 2022 Asian Para Games and won a gold medal in the shot put F36 event.

Mukashbekov represented Kazakhstan at the 2024 Summer Paralympics and won a bronze medal in the shot put F36 event.
