= Bobirjon Omonov =

Uzbekistani Paralympic athlete

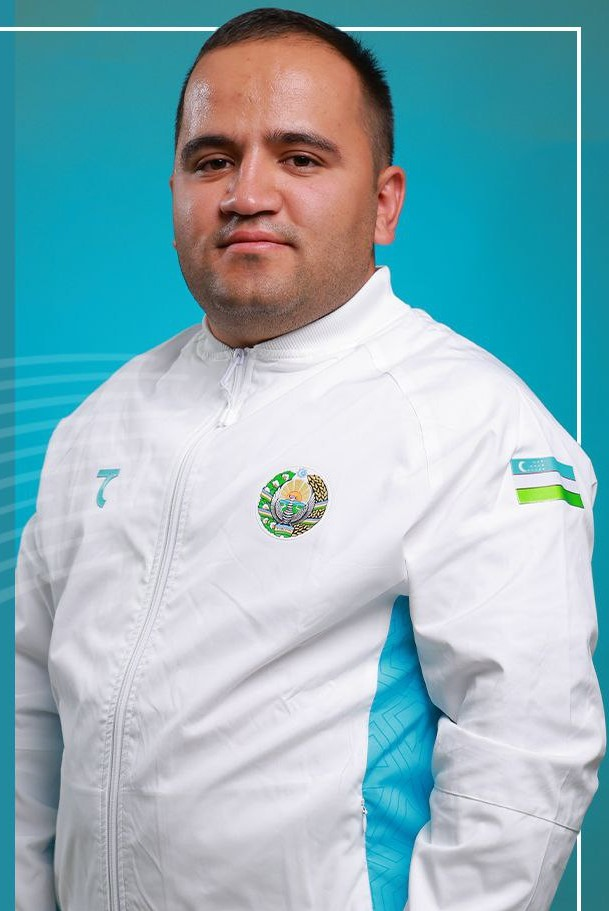
- Bobirjon Omonov

Personal information
- Nickname: Bobur
- Nationality: Uzbekistani
- Born: 11 October 2000 (age 25) Andijan, Uzbekistan

Sport
- Sport: Para athletics
- Disability class: F41
- Event: shot put
- Coached by: Mavlon Khaydarov
Medal record
Men's para-athletics
Representing Uzbekistan
Paralympic Games
Gold medal – first place	2020 Tokyo	Shot put F41
Gold medal – first place	2024 Paris	Shot put F41
World Championships
Gold medal – first place	2019 Dubai	Shot put F41
Gold medal – first place	2023 Paris	Shot put F41
Silver medal – second place	2024 Kobe	Shot put F41
Silver medal – second place	2025 New Delhi	Shot put F41
Asian Para Games
Gold medal – first place	2018 Jakarta	Shot put F41
Gold medal – first place	2022 Hangzhou	Shot put F41

Bobirjon Omonov (born 11 October 2000) is an Uzbekistani para athlete specializing in shot put in the F41 category. He is a gold medalist at the Asian Para Games, World Para Athletics Championships, and the Paralympic Games.

== Career ==
In 2016, he began training in Paralympic athletics under the guidance of coach Mavlon Khaidarov. Starting in 2017, he began participating in international competitions.

At the 2018 Asian Para Games, he won a gold medal in the shot put F41 event with a distance of 12.31.

At the 2019 World Para Athletics Championships, he won a gold medal in the shot put F41 event with a distance of 14.03 meters and secured a spot for the 2020 Summer Paralympics.

Omonov represented Uzbekistan in the shot put F41 event at the 2020 Summer Paralympics in Tokyo and won a gold medal with a distance of 14.06 meters, setting a new Paralympic record. In 2021, the President of Uzbekistan, Shavkat Mirziyoyev, awarded Omonov the honorary title of "Uzbekiston iftixori" ("Pride of Uzbekistan").

At the 2023 World Para Athletics Championships, he won a gold medal in the shot put F41 event with a distance of 14.73 meters.

At the 2024 Paris Paralympic Games, he won a gold medal in the men's shot put F41 event, breaking his previous paralympic record with a distance of 14.32 meters.
