= Wallace Santos =

Brazilian para-athlete

Personal information
- Full name: Wallace Antonio de Oliveira dos Santos
- Born: 22 July 1984 (age 41) Rio de Janeiro, Brazil

Sport
- Country: Brazil
- Sport: Para athletics
- Disability class: F55
- Event: Shot put
Medal record
Para athletics
Representing Brazil
Paralympic Games
| Gold medal – first place | 2020 Tokyo | Shot put F55 |
World Championships
| Bronze medal – third place | 2023 Paris | Shot put F55 |
Parapan American Games
| Gold medal – first place | 2023 Santiago | Shot put F55 |

Wallace Antonio de Oliveira dos Santos (born 22 July 1984) is a Brazilian para-athlete, who won gold in the shot put F55 event at the 2020 Summer Paralympics.
