= Seyed Aliasghar Javanmardi =

Iranian Paralympic athlete (born 1990)

Personal information
- Nationality: Iranian
- Born: 28 May 1990 (age 36)
- Home town: Shiraz, Iran

Sport
- Sport: Para-athletics
- Disability class: F35
- Event: shot put
Medal record
Men's para-athletics
Representing Iran
Paralympic Games
Bronze medal – third place	2024 Paris	Shot put F35
World Championships
Gold medal – first place	2025 New Delhi	Shot put F35
Silver medal – second place	2024 Kobe	Shot put F35
Bronze medal – third place	2017 London	Shot put F35

Seyed Aliasghar Javanmardi (born 28 May 1990) is an Iranian para-athlete specializing in shot put. He represented Iran at the 2024 Summer Paralympics.

== Career ==
In May 2024, Javanmardi competed at the 2024 World Para Athletics Championships and won a silver medal in the shot put F35 event. He then represented Iran at the 2024 Summer Paralympics and won a bronze medal in the shot put F35 event.

In September 2026, Javanmardi was issued with a three-year ban backdated to October 2025 for an anti-doping rule violation after testing positive for oxandrolone.
