= Ahmad Hindi (athlete) =

Jordanian Paralympic athlete (born 1995)

Personal information
- Born: 29 November 1995 (age 30) Amman, Jordan

Sport
- Country: Jordan
- Sport: Para-athletics
- Disability: Cerebral palsy
- Disability class: F34
- Event: Shot put
Medal record
Men's para-athletics
Representing Jordan
Paralympic Games
Gold medal – first place	2020 Tokyo	Shot put F34
Bronze medal – third place	2024 Paris	Shot put F34
World Championships
Gold medal – first place	2019 Dubai	Shot put F34
Gold medal – first place	2023 Paris	Shot put F34
Asian Para Games
Gold medal – first place	2018 Jakarta	Shot put F34
Gold medal – first place	2022 Hangzhou	Shot put F34
Islamic Solidarity Games
Silver medal – second place	2025 Riyadh	Discus Throw F33/F34

Ahmad Samer Hindi (born 29 November 1995) is a Jordanian Paralympic athlete. He is a two-time medalist, including gold, in the men's shot put F34 event at the Paralympic Games. He is also a two-time gold medalist in this event at the World Para Athletics Championships.

== Career ==
He won the gold medal in the men's shot put F34 event at the 2020 Summer Paralympics held in Tokyo, Japan. He also won the gold medal in the men's shot put F34 event at the 2019 World Para Athletics Championships held in Dubai, United Arab Emirates.

In 2023, he won the gold medal in the men's shot put F34 event at the World Para Athletics Championships held in Paris, France.
