= Vladimir Sviridov =

Russian Paralympic athlete (born 1990)

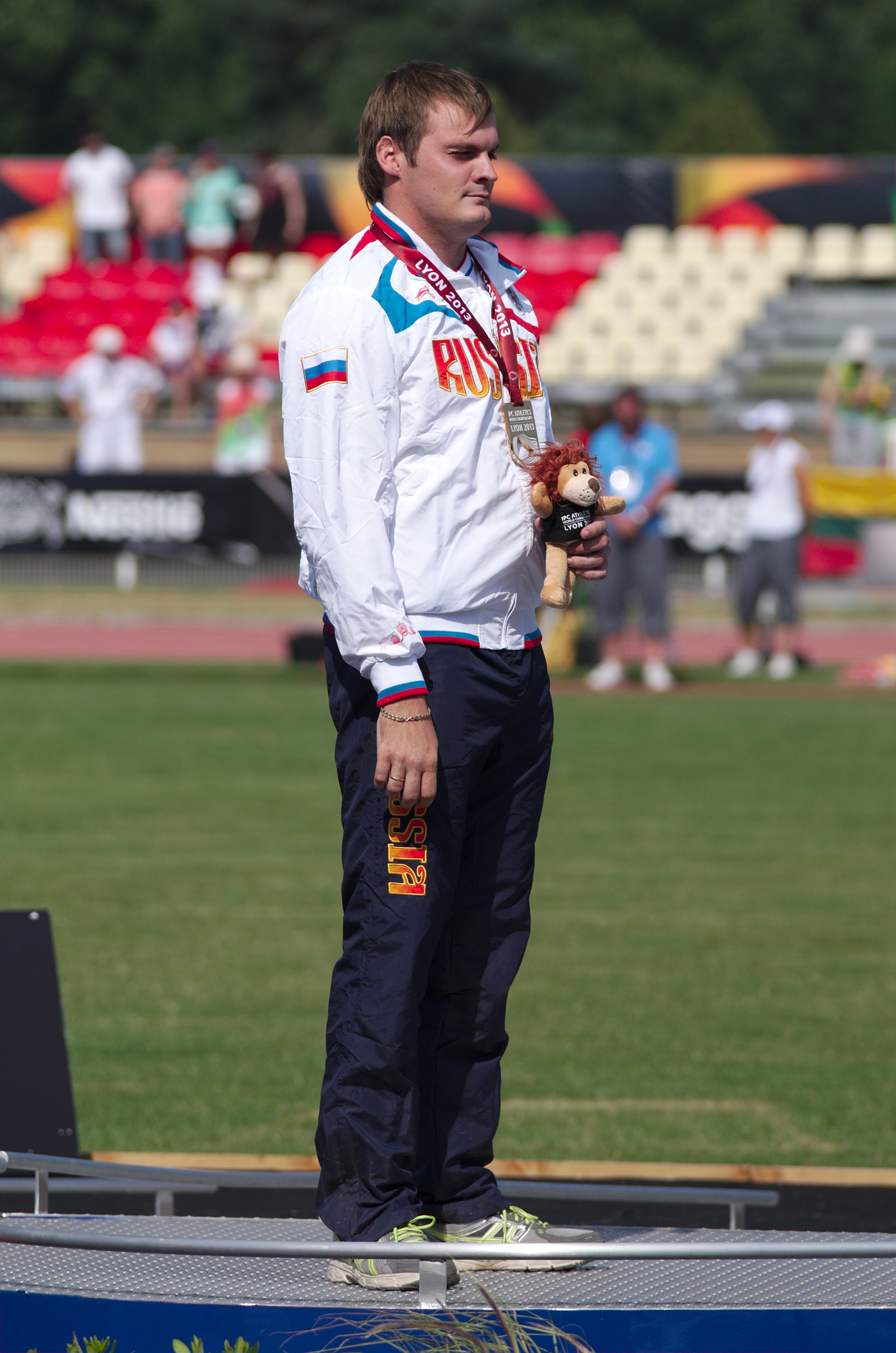
- Sviridov receiving his shot put gold at the 2013 IPC World Championships

Personal information
- Full name: Vladimir Sergeyevich Sviridov
- Nationality: Russian
- Born: 10 May 1990 (age 36) Novocherkassk, Soviet Union

Sport
- Country: Russia
- Sport: Paralympic athletics
- Disability: Cerebral Palsy
- Disability class: T36/F36
- Event(s): Shot put Long jump
- Club: Rostov-na-Donu
- Coached by: Olga Isupova
Medal record
Men's para athletics
Representing Russia
Paralympic Games
| Gold medal – first place | 2020 Tokyo | Shot put – F36 |
| Bronze medal – third place | 2012 London | Long jump – F36 |
World Championships
| Gold medal – first place | 2011 Christchurch | Long jump F12 |
| Gold medal – first place | 2013 Lyon | Shot put F36 |
| Silver medal – second place | 2011 Christchurch | Shot put F35–36 |
| Silver medal – second place | 2015 Doha | Shot put – F36 |
European Championships
| Gold medal – first place | 2014 Swansea | Shot put – F36 |
| Gold medal – first place | 2016 Grosseto | Shot put – F36 |
Representing Neutral Paralympic Athletes (NPA)
Paralympic Games
| Gold medal – first place | 2024 Paris | Shot put F36 |
World Championships
| Gold medal – first place | 2025 New Delhi | Shot put – F36 |
| Bronze medal – third place | 2024 Kobe | Shot put – F36 |

Vladimir Sergeyevich Sviridov (Владимир Сергеевич Свиридов; born 10 May 1990) is a Russian para-athlete competing mainly in category F36 long jump and shot put. In 2013 he took the gold in the shot put at the IPC Athletics World Championships equaling his own world record which he set two months earlier in Emmeloord.

== Personal history ==
Sviridov was born in Novocherkassk, Soviet Union in 1990. He was born with cerebral palsy. He is married to fellow Russian para-athlete Elena Ivanova.

== Career history ==
Sviridov's first major international competition was the 2011 IPC Athletics World Championships held in Christchurch, New Zealand. There he took two medals, gold in the F36 long jump with a distance of 5.29m, and silver in the F35–36 shot put. His gold winning performance in the long jump set a new Championship record in the F36 category, just 4 cm behind Roman Pavlyk's world record. Sviridov represented Russia at the 2012 Summer Paralympics in London where he competed in the F36 long jump, his favoured F36 shot put was not a featured event of the games. He posted a distance of 5.08m in the long jump taking the bronze medal.

The next year he again represented Russia at the IWAS Dutch Open in Emmeloord, setting a new world record in the shot put with a distance of 14.70m. Two months later he travelled to Lyon to take part in the 2013 IPC Athletics World Championships. At the games he won gold in the shot put, equaling his world record throw of 14.70m set at Emmeloord.
