= Roman Danyliuk =

Ukrainian Paralympic athlete (born 1993)

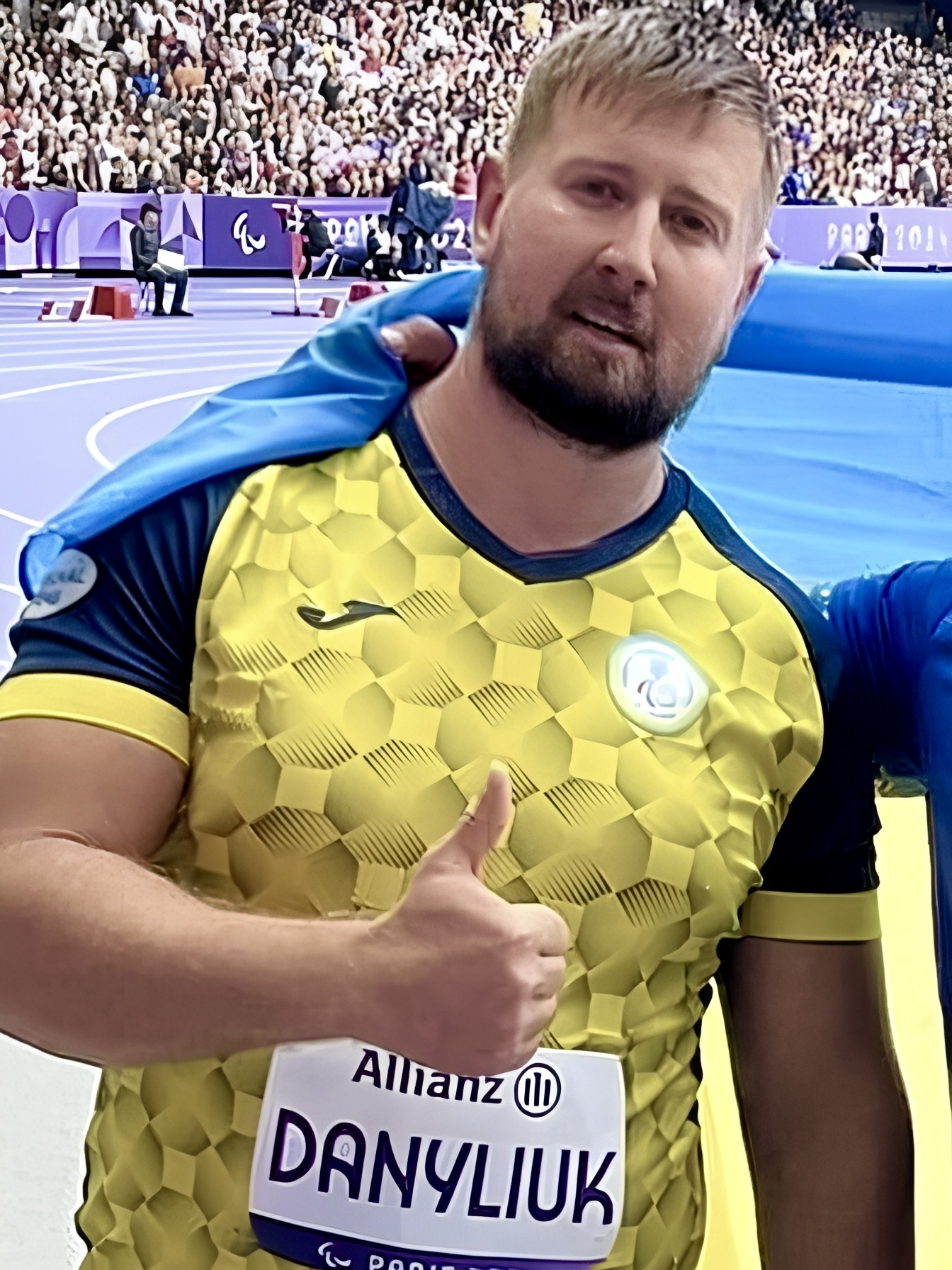

Personal information
- Born: 7 March 1993 (age 33)

Sport
- Country: Ukraine
- Sport: Para-athletics
- Event: Shot put
Medal record
Paralympic Games
Silver medal – second place	2020 Tokyo	Shot put F12
Bronze medal – third place	2016 Rio de Janeiro	Shot put F12
Bronze medal – third place	2024 Paris	Shot put F12
World Championships
Gold medal – first place	2023 Paris	Shot put F12

Roman Danyliuk (Ukrainian: Роман Тарасович Данилюк; born 7 March 1993) is a Ukrainian para-track and field athlete who competed at the 2016 Summer Paralympics in the T12/F12 shot put. He won a bronze medal in the shot put with a season's best distance of 15.94 metres.
