= Maksym Koval (athlete) =

Ukrainian Paralympic athlete (born 1996)

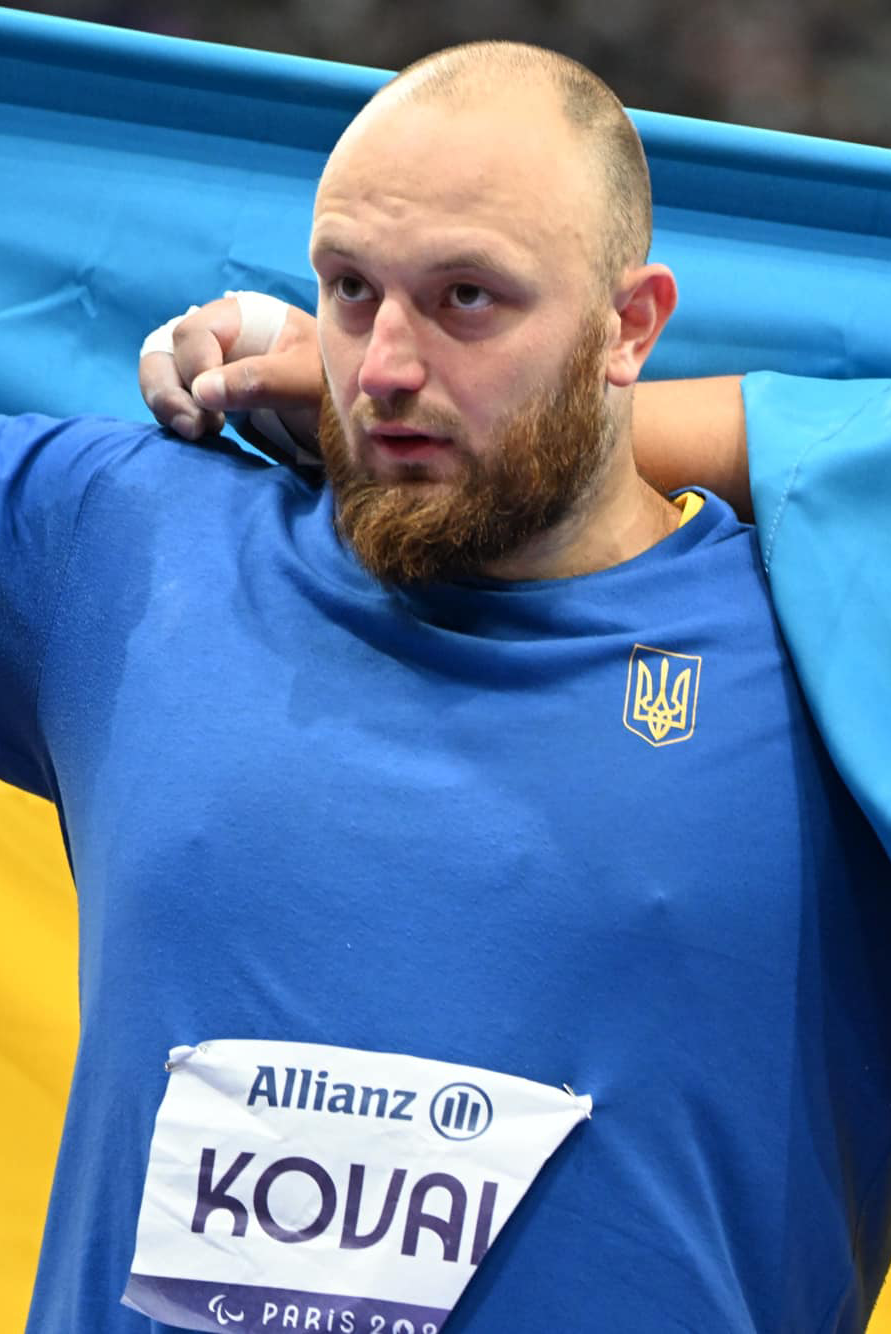
- Koval at the 2024 Summer Paralympics

Personal information
- Nationality: Ukrainian
- Born: 26 December 1996 (age 29)

Sport
- Sport: Paralympic athletics
- Disability class: F20
- Event: shot put
Medal record
Men's para athletics
Representing Ukraine
Paralympic Games
| Gold medal – first place | 2020 Tokyo | Shot put F20 |
| Bronze medal – third place | 2024 Paris | Shot put F20 |
World Championships
| Gold medal – first place | 2019 Dubai | Shot put F20 |
| Gold medal – first place | 2023 Paris | Shot put F20 |
| Silver medal – second place | 2025 New Delhi | Shot put F20 |

Maksym Koval (born 12 December 1996) is a Ukrainian Paralympic athlete. He made his first Paralympic appearance representing Ukraine at the 2020 Summer Paralympics held in Tokyo, Japan.

== Career ==
He clinched gold medal in the men's F20 shot put event during the 2020 Summer Paralympics.

Initially the gold medal in the shot put event was awarded to Malaysia's Muhammad Ziyad Zolkefli who also set a new world record twice, and broke the national record with a 17.94m throw during his 3rd throw at the final. However, he was later disqualified for not showing up on the court on time and a Ukrainian official had also shown his dissent over the gold medal being initially awarded to Zolkefli. Koval was awarded the gold medal.

The incident sparked public outcry in Malaysia, and Koval was subjected to social media abuse.
