= Liu Li (parathlete) =

Chinese Paralympic athlete

Personal information
- Nationality: Chinese
- Born: 6 August 1986 (age 39) Tangshan, Hebei, China

Sport
- Country: China
- Sport: Athletics
- Disability class: F32
- Events: Club throw, shot put
Medal record
Men's Paralympic athletics
Representing China
Paralympic Games
Gold medal – first place	2020 Tokyo	Club throw F32
Gold medal – first place	2020 Tokyo	Shot put F32
World Championships
Gold medal – first place	2023 Paris	Shot put F32
Silver medal – second place	2019 Dubai	Shot put F32
Asian Para Games
Gold medal – first place	2022 Hangzhou	Club throw F32

Liu Li (born 6 August 1986) is a Chinese Paralympic athlete who competes in the F32 category.

== Career ==
Liu won a gold medal at the 2020 Summer Paralympics in the club throw with a world record of 45.39. He also won a gold medal in the shot put with a WR of 12.97. He won a gold medal at the 2019 World Para Athletics Championships in the shot put.
