= Bartosz Górczak =

Polish Paralympic athlete (born 1988)

Personal information
- Nationality: Polish
- Born: 8 January 1988 (age 38)

Sport
- Country: Poland
- Sport: Para athletics
- Disability class: F53
- Event: Shot put
Medal record
Para athletics
Representing Poland
World Championships
Gold medal – first place	2025 New Delhi	Shot put F53
European Championships
Silver medal – second place	2021 Bydgoszcz	Shot put F53

Bartosz Górczak (born 8 January 1988) is a Polish para-athlete specializing in shot put. He represented Poland at the 2024 Summer Paralympics.

== Career ==
Gorczak represented Poland at the 2024 Summer Paralympics and finished in fourth place in the shot put F53 event with a throw of 8.41 metres. An appeal of the national delegation against a false attempt led to Giga Ochkhikidze's gold medal being revoked, and awarding Gorczak a bronze medal. However, Ochkhikidze's gold medal was later reinstated following another appeal.
