= Zakariae Derhem =

Moroccan Paralympic athlete (born 1990)

Personal information
- Born: 9 October 1990 (age 36) Fez, Morocco

Sport
- Country: Morocco
- Sport: Para-athletics
- Event: Shot put
Medal record
Paralympic Games
Gold medal – first place	2020 Tokyo	Shot put F33
World Championships
Gold medal – first place	2023 Paris	Shot put F33

Zakariae Derhem (born 9 October 1990) is a Moroccan Paralympic athlete.

== Career ==
He won the gold medal in the men's shot put F33 event at the 2020 Summer Paralympics held in Tokyo, Japan.
