= Nebojša Đurić =

Serbian disabled athlete

Personal information
- Nationality: Serbian
- Born: 17 October 1987 (age 38) Titovo Užice, SR Serbia, Yugoslavia
- Home town: Užice

Sport
- Sport: Athletics
- Disability class: F55, F56
- Events: Shot Put, Discus Throw
- Club: AK Pora Užice
Medal record
Men's Athletics
Representing Serbia
Paralympic Games
Silver medal – second place	2024 Paris	Shot put F55
World Championships
Silver medal – second place	2024 Kobe	Shot put F55
Silver medal – second place	2025 New Delhi	Shot put F55
Bronze medal – third place	2019 Dubai	Shot put F55
World European Championships
Silver medal – second place	2018 Berlin	Shot put F55
Gold medal – first place	2018 Berlin	Discus throw F56

Nebojša Đurić (Serbian Cyrillic: Небојша Ђурић; born 17 October 1987) is a disabled athlete from Serbia. He competes in discus throws in the F56 classification and in shot put in the F55 classification.

== Career ==
He won a gold medal in the F56 discus throws at the 2018 European Championships and bronze medal in the F55 shot put at the 2019 World Championships in Dubai. in November 2010 he was involved in a traffic accident that resulted in paralysis below the waist.
