= Thiago Paulino dos Santos =

Brazilian Paralympic athlete

Thiago Paulino
Personal information
- Full name: Thiago Paulino dos Santos
- Born: 29 December 1985 (age 40) Orlândia, São Paulo, Brazil

Sport
- Country: Brazil
- Sport: Para athletics
- Disability class: F57
- Events: Discus throw; Shot put
Medal record
Men's para athletics
Representing Brazil
Paralympic Games
Silver medal – second place	2024 Paris	Shot put F57
Bronze medal – third place	2020 Tokyo	Shot put F57
World Championships
Gold medal – first place	2017 London	Discus throw F57
Gold medal – first place	2017 London	Shot put F57
Gold medal – first place	2019 Dubai	Shot put F57
Silver medal – second place	2023 Paris	Shot put F57
Parapan American Games
Gold medal – first place	2015 Toronto	Shot put F57
Gold medal – first place	2019 Lima	Shot put F57
Gold medal – first place	2023 Santiago	Shot put F57
Bronze medal – third place	2015 Toronto	Discus throw F51/52/53/57

Thiago Paulino dos Santos (born 29 December 1985) is a Brazilian Paralympic athlete. He is a two-time medalist at the Paralympic Games.

== Career ==
He won the bronze medal in the men's shot put F57 event at the 2020 Summer Paralympics in Tokyo, Japan. At the time, he won the gold medal with a throw of 15.10 metres but after some of his throws were ruled invalid, he dropped to third place.

He earned Parapan American Games gold medals in the shot put F57 events at Toronto 2015, Lima 2019, and Santiago 2023.
