= Alan Kokoity =

Russian Paralympic athlete (born 1988)

Personal information
- Nationality: The Ossetian
- Born: 2 July 1988 (age 37) Vladikavkaz, Russia

Sport
- Sport: Para-athletics
- Disability class: F36
- Event: shot put
Medal record
Men's para-athletics
Representing Neutral Paralympic Athletes
Paralympic Games
Silver medal – second place	2024 Paris	Shot put F36
World Championships
Silver medal – second place	2024 Kobe	Shot put F36
Bronze medal – third place	2025 New Delhi	Shot put F36
Representing Russia
World Championships
Bronze medal – third place	2019 Dubai	Shot put F36
European Championships
Gold medal – first place	2021 Bydgoszcz	Shot put F36

Alan Kokoity (born 2 July 1988) is a Russian para-athlete specializing in shot put.

== Career ==
In May 2024, Kokoity competed at the 2024 World Para Athletics Championships and won a silver medal in the shot put F36 event. He then represented Neutral Paralympic Athletes at the 2024 Summer Paralympics and won a silver medal in the shot put F36 event.
