= Luka Baković =

Croatian Paralympic athlete (born 1997)

Personal information
- Nationality: Croatian
- Born: 3 December 1997 (age 28)
- Home town: Split, Croatia

Sport
- Country: Croatia
- Sport: Para-athletics
- Disability class: F46
- Events: javelin throw shot put
Medal record
Men's para-athletics
Representing Croatia
Paralympic Games
| Bronze medal – third place | 2024 Paris | Shot put F46 |
World Championships
| Bronze medal – third place | 2024 Kobe | Shot put F46 |
| Bronze medal – third place | 2025 New Delhi | Shot put F46 |
European Championships
| Bronze medal – third place | 2021 Bydgoszcz | Javelin throw F46 |

Luka Baković (born 3 December 1997) is a Croatian para-athlete specializing in throwing events: javelin throw and shot put. He represented Croatia at the 2024 Summer Paralympics, winning bronze medal in shot put event. He also won two bronze medals in shot put at the 2024 and 2025 World Para Athletics Championships, as well as bronze in javelin throw at the 2021 European Para Athletics Championship.

== Career ==
In May 2024, Baković competed at the 2024 World Para Athletics Championships and won a bronze medal in the shot put F46 event. He then represented Croatia at the 2024 Summer Paralympics and won a bronze medal in the shot put F46 event.
