= Faisal Sorour =

Kuwaiti Paralympic athlete (born 1996)

Personal information
- Born: 29 September 1996 (age 29)

Sport
- Country: Kuwait
- Sport: Para-athletics
- Disability class: F63
- Event: shot put
Medal record
Men's para-athletics
Representing Kuwait
Paralympic Games
Gold medal – first place	2024 Paris	Shot put F63
Bronze medal – third place	2020 Tokyo	Shot put F63
World Championships
Silver medal – second place	2025 New Delhi	Shot put F63
Bronze medal – third place	2023 Paris	Shot put F38

Faisal Sorour (born 29 September 1996) is a Kuwaiti Paralympic athlete. He won the bronze medal in the men's shot put F63 event at the 2020 Summer Paralympics in Tokyo, Japan.
