= Abdelillah Gani =

Moroccan Paralympic athlete (born 1987)

Personal information
- Nationality: Moroccan
- Born: 18 September 1987 (age 39)

Sport
- Sport: Para-athletics
- Disability class: F53
- Event: shot put
Medal record
Para-athletics
Representing Morocco
Paralympic Games
Silver medal – second place	2024 Paris	Shot put F53
World Championships
Silver medal – second place	2024 Kobe	Shot put F53

Abdelillah Gani (born 18 September 1987) is a Moroccan para-athlete specializing in shot put. He represented Morocco at the 2024 Summer Paralympics.

== Career ==
Gani represented Morocco at the 2018 Wheelchair Basketball World Championship. This was the first time Morocco qualified for the Wheelchair Basketball World Championship.

Gani represented Morocco at the 2024 World Para Athletics Championships and won a silver medal in the shot put F53 event, with a throw of 8.79 metres.

At the 2024 Summer Paralympics, he won a silver medal in the shot put F53 event with a throw of 9.22 metres. Giga Ochkhikidze originally won gold, however, after an appeal of the national delegation against a false attempt, Gani was upgraded to gold. Ochkhikidze's gold medal was later reinstated following another appeal.
