= 2019 World Para Athletics Championships – Men's shot put =

The men's shot put at the 2019 World Para Athletics Championships was held in Dubai in November 2019.

== Medalists ==
Event	Gold		Silver		Bronze	
F11	Mahdi Olad; Iran	14.44 AR	Miljenko Vucic; Croatia	14.42 PB	Alessandro Rodrigo da Silva; Brazil	13.99 AR
F12	Roman Danyliuk; Ukraine	16.69 WR	Kim Lopez Gonzalez; Spain	15.69 SB	Elbek Sultonov; Uzbekistan	15.39
F20	Maksym Koval; Ukraine	17.11 AR	Muhammad Ziyad Zolkefli; Malaysia	17.03	Efstratios Nikolaidis; Greece	16.61 PB
F32	Liu Li; China	12.05 WR	Lahouari Bahlaz; Algeria	9.96	Mohamed Nadjib Amchi; Algeria	9.72
F33	Aleksandr Khrupin; Russia	11.21	Kamel Kardjena; Algeria	11.14 AR	Mohammadreza Ahmadi; Iran	11.09 AR
F34	Ahmad Hindi; Jordan	12.17 WR	Mehran Nikkeimajd; Iran	11.41 PB	Mauricio Valencia; Colombia	11.35 AR
F35	Khusniddin Norbekov; Uzbekistan	17.32 WR	Fu Xinhan; China	16.53 PB	Hernán Emanuel Urra; Argentina	15.87 AR
F36	Vladimir Sviridov; Russia	16.32 WR	Yassine Guenichi; Tunisia	14.74 AR	Alan Kokoity; Russia	14.73
F37	Albert Khinchagov; Russia	15.25 PB	Ahmed Ben Moslah; Tunisia	14.40 AR	João Victor Teixeira de Souza Silva; Brazil	13.76
F38	Cameron Crombie; Australia	15.73 SB	Oleksandr Doroshenko; Ukraine	15.27 AR	Marty Jackson; Australia	15.14 PB
F40	Denis Gnezdilov; Russia	10.88 =WR	Garrah Tnaiash; Iraq	10.77 SB	Matija Sloup; Croatia	10.30 PB
F41	Bobirjon Omonov; Uzbekistan	14.03 CR	Niko Kappel; Germany	13.87	Kyron Duke; United Kingdom	13.82
F46	Joshua Cinnamo; United States	16.80 WR	Greg Stewart; Canada	16.30 PB	Nikita Prokhorov; Russia	15.54 SB
F53	Ales Kisy; Czech Republic	7.93 SB	Scot Severn; United States	7.77	Alireza Mokhtari Hemami; Iran	7.64
F55	Ruzhdi Ruzhdi; Bulgaria	12.25	Lech Stoltman; Poland	12.22 PB	Nebojša Đurić; Serbia	12.15 PB
F57	Thiago Paulino dos Santos; Brazil	14.68	Mohamad Mohamad; Syria	14.29 PB	Wu Guoshan; China	14.21 SB
F63	Aled Davies; United Kingdom	15.32	Tom Habscheid; Luxembourg	15.10 WR	Sajad Mohammadian; Iran	14.39
WR world record | AR area record | CR championship record | GR games record | NR national record | OR Olympic record | PB personal best | SB season best | WL world leading (in a given season)

== Detailed results ==
=== F11 ===
Rank	Athlete	1	2	3	4	5	6	Best	Notes
1st place, gold medalist(s)	Mahdi Olad; Iran	14.06	X	13.57	14.42	14.44	12.67	14.44	AR
2nd place, silver medalist(s)	Miljenko Vucic; Croatia	13.76	14.42	14.30	14.20	X	14.37	14.42	PB
3rd place, bronze medalist(s)	Alessandro Rodrigo Da Silva; Brazil	13.18	13.38	X	13.99	13.03	X	13.99	AR
4	Mourmohammad Arekhi; Iran	13.21	12.42	13.18	X	X	X	13.21	
5	Sergei Shatalov; Russia	12.58	12.72	12.77	X	12.89	13.03	13.03	
6	Igor Baskakov; Russia	11.86	11.73	12.34	12.32	12.55	12.67	12.67	
7	Alvaro dal Amo Cano; Spain	11.84	12.34	11.85	11.76	X	11.78	12.34	
8	Ali Asaad; Syria	X	10.61	11.55	X	11.29	10.84	11.55	
9	Farrukhjon Saidkhodjaev; Uzbekistan	11.21	11.46	11.20				11.46	PB
10	Mirolsaw Madzia; Poland	10.20	11.09	9.66				11.09	
11	Petteri Peitso; Finland	X	X	10.44				10.44	
12	Abdallah Alshafeey; Jordan	9.26	9.99	9.36				9.99	
13	Evgheni Iagudin; Moldova	9.18	9.52	9.43				9.52	
14	Juan Carlos Caballero; Panama	X	X	8.88				8.88	
15	Charles Atangana Ntsama; Cameroon	X	8.56	X				8.56	
16	Roger Saavedra; Panama	8.29	X	X				8.29	

=== F12 ===
Rank	Athlete	1	2	3	4	5	6	Best	Notes
1st place, gold medalist(s)	Roman Danyliuk; Ukraine	X	15.60	16.14	15.87	16.48	16.69	16.69	WR
2nd place, silver medalist(s)	Kim Lopez Gonzalez; Spain	14.90	15.69	15.62	15.36	15.27	X	15.69	SB
3rd place, bronze medalist(s)	Elbek Sultonov; Uzbekistan	15.04	X	15.27	X	15.39	X	15.39	
4	Volodymyr Ponomarenko; Ukraine	X	X	14.19	14.49	15.09	X	15.09	PB
5	Josiah Jamison; United States	11.62	X	13.35	13.35	13.28	13.18	13.35	PB
6	Héctor Cabrera Llácer; Spain	12.65	13.01	13.04	X	13.14	12.12	13.14	SB
7	Marek Wietecki; Poland	X	12.43	12.67	12.45	12.40	12.68	12.68	
8	Vladimir Butucea; Moldova	11.35	X	X	X	10.28	10.23	11.35	

=== F20 ===
Rank	Athlete	1	2	3	4	5	6	Best	Notes
1st place, gold medalist(s)	Maksym Koval; Ukraine	14.35	16.46	16.10	16.59	16.88	17.11	17.11	AR
2nd place, silver medalist(s)	Muhammad Ziyad Zolkefli; Malaysia	15.67	16.81	16.75	16.08	17.03	16.48	17.03	
3rd place, bronze medalist(s)	Efstratios Nikolaidis; Greece	15.60	16.00	15.46	16.06	16.61	16.32	16.61	PB
4	Dimitrios Senikidis; Greece	15.05	14.88	15.73	16.18	15.72	15.31	16.18	PB
5	Oleksandr Yarovyi; Ukraine	14.39	X	15.02	14.65	15.35	15.68	15.68	PB
6	Stalin David Mosquera; Ecuador	14.20	15.01	X	15.61	X	15.09	15.61	SB
7	Jeffrey Ige; Sweden	14.21	15.43	15.01	X	X	15.15	15.43	SB
8	Jordi Patricio Congo Villalba; Ecuador	13.85	14.97	X	14.63	14.69	14.56	14.97	
9	Todd Hodgetts; Australia	14.88	13.67	14.43				14.88	
10	Alexander Alexandrov; Russia	14.09	14.24	X				14.24	SB
11	Istvan Szollosi; Hungary	12.06	13.66	X				13.66	PB
12	Mohamad Aliff Mohamad Awi; Malaysia	11.80	11.98	13.40				13.40	PB
13	Boonkond Sanepoot; Thailand	12.04	12.30	12.57				12.57	
14	Charalampos Georgiadis; Greece	X	12.15	12.45				12.45	
15	Jack Lewer; New Zealand	10.49	10.47	11.15				11.15	
16	Mohammed Ali H M Al-Abd; Qatar	9.64	10.30	10.28				10.30	

=== F32 ===
Rank	Athlete	1	2	3	4	5	6	Best	Notes
1st place, gold medalist(s)	Liu Li; China	8.65	10.51	X	10.99	12.05	11.11	12.05	WR
2nd place, silver medalist(s)	Lahouari Bahlaz; Algeria	9.45	9.96	X	X	9.22	X	9.96	
3rd place, bronze medalist(s)	Mohamed Nadjib Amchi; Algeria	9.72	X	X	8.60	X	9.34	9.72	
4	Aleksei Churkin; Russia	X	X	X	8.64	9.20	9.72	9.72	
5	Athanasios Konstantinidis; Greece	7.67	7.69	6.51	X	8.17	8.94	8.94	
6	Ahmed Mehideb; Algeria	8.23	X	X	8.46	X	8.39	8.46	
7	Maciej Sochal; Poland	7.02	8.38	8.34	8.25	8.22	X	8.38	
8	Abdulazizkhon Abdukhakimov; Uzbekistan	X	X	6.92	6.88	6.28	6.29	6.92	
9	Dimitrios Zisidis; Greece	X	X	X	6.55	X	X	6.55	

=== F33 ===
Rank	Athlete	1	2	3	4	5	6	Best	Notes
1st place, gold medalist(s)	Aleksandr Khrupin; Russia	11.00	10.96	11.11	10.74	X	11.21	11.21	
2nd place, silver medalist(s)	Kamel Kardjena; Algeria	10.04	10.12	10.71	10.46	11.14	X	11.14	AR
3rd place, bronze medalist(s)	Mohammadreza Ahmadi; Iran	10.50	11.09	10.79	10.87	10.02	10.67	11.09	AR
4	Giuseppe Campoccio; Italy	X	10.50	10.60	9.92	X	10.66	10.66	
5	Deni Černi; Croatia	9.50	10.43	X	X	10.01	9.45	10.43	PB
6	Hani Alnakhli; Saudi Arabia	9.66	X	X	X	X	X	9.66	PB
7	Michal Glab; Poland	X	X	8.36	X	9.03	9.36	9.36	
8	Ahmed Alhosani; United Arab Emirates	8.59	8.26	X	8.01	8.45	X	8.59	
9	Gertrudis Ortega Campos; Panama	X	8.19	8.50	8.07	8.48	8.41	8.50	AR
10	Lazaros Stefanidis; Greece	8.28	X	8.29	7.70	X	8.40	8.40	
11	Abdulaziz Alshekaili; United Arab Emirates	4.57	7.89	6.48	7.98	2.88	8.13	8.13	
12	Janis Juhnevics; Latvia	7.03	6.89	7.51	X	X	6.96	7.51	PB

=== F34 ===
Rank	Athlete	1	2	3	4	5	6	Best	Notes
1st place, gold medalist(s)	Ahmad Hindi; Jordan	11.55	X	X	11.94	11.94	12.17	12.17	WR
2nd place, silver medalist(s)	Mehran Nikoeimajd; Iran	11.00	11.38	11.41	11.23	X	X	11.41	PB
3rd place, bronze medalist(s)	Mauricio Valencia; Colombia	11.28	11.15	11.05	10.78	11.35	11.08	11.35	AR
4	Abdulrahman Fiqi; Qatar	11.23	X	10.73	10.99	X	X	11.23	SB
5	Tomasz Paulinski; Poland	10.62	11.11	10.96	11.03	10.48	11.05	11.11	AR
6	Hadi Kaeidi; Iran	10.70	X	10.75	10.70	10.41	X	10.75	
7	Thierry Cibone; France	9.57	10.16	9.98	10.02	X	10.06	10.16	
8	Wang Yanzhang; China	9.86	9.99	10.14	9.83	X	10.06	10.14	
9	Zhang Zhongqiang; China	9.86	9.67	9.91	9.98	X	9.84	9.98	
10	Louis Gervais Baha; Cameroon	8.05	X	8.21	8.50	8.08	8.04	8.50	
11	Olesandr Aliekseienko; Israel	8.19	X	8.21	8.47	8.25	8.22	8.47	
12	Tuomas Manni; Finland	6.84	8.24	8.46	X	8.03	7.89	8.46	PB

=== F35 ===
Rank	Athlete	1	2	3	4	5	6	Best	Notes
1st place, gold medalist(s)	Khusniddin Norbekov; Uzbekistan	16.39	17.32	16.94	X	15.88	X	17.32	WR
2nd place, silver medalist(s)	Fu Xinhan; China	16.03	16.53	15.70	X	X	15.74	16.53	PB
3rd place, bronze medalist(s)	Hernán Emanuel Urra; Argentina	15.87	15.14	15.75	X	15.28	15.65	15.87	AR
4	Seyed Javanmardi; Iran	15.36	15.04	13.94	15.01	14.43	14.37	15.36	
5	Alexander Elmin; Russia	12.73	13.45	13.25	12.95	13.24	12.77	13.45	SB
6	Arvind Arvind; India	X	11.48	13.02	12.37	13.06	11.98	13.06	PB
7	Quentin Desclefs; Belgium	X	7.17	7.40	X	X	7.37	7.40	
8	Andrei Valentir; Moldova	7.00	7.38	7.04	7.03	6.79	7.03	7.38	

=== F36 ===
Rank	Athlete	1	2	3	4	5	6	Best	Notes
1st place, gold medalist(s)	Vladimir Sviridov; Russia	X	15.31	X	X	15.68	16.32	16.32	WR
2nd place, silver medalist(s)	Yassine Guenichi; Tunisia	14.74	X	X	13.82	13.40	X	14.74	AR
3rd place, bronze medalist(s)	Alan Kokoity; Russia	14.18	14.73	14.53	14.65	X	13.34	14.73	
4	Sebastian Dietz; Germany	13.56	X	13.98	14.12	14.52	14.01	14.52	
5	Mykola Dibrova; Ukraine	13.16	14.01	13.80	13.01	13.38	12.64	14.01	
6	Rufat Rafiyev; Azerbaijan	13.49	13.63	12.90	X	12.55	12.40	13.63	SB
7	Mohammed Al Kaabi; United Arab Emirates	12.10	12.38	11.96	12.49	12.66	12.38	12.66	PB
8	Pawel Piotrowski; Poland	11.44	11.66	12.50	11.84	12.50	12.40	12.50	SB
9	Dastan Mukashbekov; Kazakhstan	11.59	12.20	12.09				12.20	PB
10	Georgios Vagiannopoulos; Greece	11.54	11.47	11.74				11.74	
11	Ivan Zaleznyak; Kazakhstan	11.24	10.99	10.95				11.24	
12	Reginald Benade; Namibia	10.36	10.33	10.98				10.98	SB
13	Saeed Mubarak; United Arab Emirates	8.99	8.77	X				8.99	

=== F37 ===
Rank	Athlete	1	2	3	4	5	6	Best	Notes
1st place, gold medalist(s)	Albert Khinchagov; Russia	14.78	15.06	14.70	15.04	15.25	14.78	15.25	PB
2nd place, silver medalist(s)	Ahmed Ben Moslah; Tunisia	X	13.56	12.81	13.91	14.40	14.35	14.40	AR
3rd place, bronze medalist(s)	João Victor Teixeira de Souza Silva; Brazil	13.76	13.64	13.31	13.55	X	X	13.76	
4	Tomasz Sciubak; Poland	13.54	13.00	13.03	13.06	13.11	13.54	13.54	PB
5	Li Cuiqing; China	13.04	13.34	13.45	13.46	13.33	13.26	13.46	PB
6	Emanoel Victor Souza de Oliveira; Brazil	13.30	12.94	13.40	X	13.19	13.43	13.43	
7	Donatas Dundzys; Lithuania	X	13.29	13.42	13.27	X	X	13.42	
8	Jakub Miroslaw; Poland	13.33	13.16	13.13				13.33	PB
9	Mykola Zhabnyak; Ukraine	12.22	12.37	13.05				13.05	
10	Dhari Buti; Kuwait	12.06	12.40	12.21				12.40	SB
11	Ben Tuimaseve; New Zealand	11.68	12.08	X				12.08	AR
12	Mohamed Mohamed Ramadan; Egypt	11.42	11.70	11.81				11.81	
13	Ahmad Fauzi; Indonesia	11.10	11.32	10.22				11.32	PB
14	Michal Pallag; Czech Republic	11.27	10.96	10.51				11.27	
—	Shahrad Nasajpour; Refugee Paralympic Team	X	X	X				NM	

=== F38 ===
Rank	Athlete	1	2	3	4	5	6	Best	Notes
1st place, gold medalist(s)	Cameron Crombie; Australia	15.73	X	X	15.36	15.49	15.10	15.73	SB
2nd place, silver medalist(s)	Oleksandr Doroshenko; Ukraine	14.88	15.14	15.00	14.45	15.15	15.27	15.27	AR
3rd place, bronze medalist(s)	Marty Jackson; Australia	13.91	14.36	13.57	15.14	14.58	14.73	15.14	PB
4	Apostolos Charitonidis; Greece	14.09	X	14.96	X	13.53	X	14.96	
5	Hamdi Ouerfelli; Tunisia	13.21	13.37	13.61	13.52	12.98	X	13.61	
6	Petr Vratil; Czech Republic	11.11	11.16	11.62	X	12.40	12.42	12.42	PB
7	Dmitrijs Silovs; Latvia	11.89	12.38	11.84	X	X	11.80	12.38	PB
8	Ahmed Meishaimaa; Bahrain	X	11.28	11.52	X	11.72	11.72	11.72	
9	Sam Walker; Australia	10.41	X	X				10.41	

=== F40 ===
Rank	Athlete	1	2	3	4	5	6	Best	Notes
1st place, gold medalist(s)	Denis Gnezdilov; Russia	10.25	10.52	10.69	10.88	10.71	10.54	10.88	=WR
2nd place, silver medalist(s)	Garrah Tnaiash; Iraq	10.32	10.76	10.77	X	10.40	9.90	10.77	SB
3rd place, bronze medalist(s)	Matija Sloup; Croatia	10.30	9.70	10.27	10.17	7.97	9.85	10.30	PB
4	Dmitry Dushkin; Russia	9.85	10.05	10.08	10.22	X	X	10.22	
5	Miguel Monteiro; Portugal	10.18	9.91	10.10	9.74	9.77	10.06	10.18	
6	Muhammad Diroy Noordin; Singapore	8.35	8.30	8.95	9.17	9.32	9.08	9.32	
7	Chen Zhenyu; China	X	8.66	9.24	8.81	9.10	X	9.24	
8	Wang Wei; China	8.69	8.82	8.86	8.41	9.02	X	9.02	PB
9	Tran Van Nguyen; Vietnam	7.91	8.21	8.18				8.21	
10	Benian Richard Duffi; Ivory Coast	X	8.07	X				8.07	
11	Lin Keli; China	X	X	7.79				7.79	
12	Gyeltshen Gyeltshen; Bhutan	6.29	6.06	X				6.29	PB

=== F41 ===
Rank	Athlete	1	2	3	4	5	6	Best	Notes
1st place, gold medalist(s)	Bobirjon Omonov; Uzbekistan	13.76	14.03	12.25	12.05	13.35	13.41	14.03	CR
2nd place, silver medalist(s)	Niko Kappel; Germany	13.00	13.87	13.11	13.59	X	13.31	13.87	
3rd place, bronze medalist(s)	Kyron Duke; United Kingdom	12.08	13.82	X	13.12	13.36	13.55	13.82	
4	Hagan Landry; United States	12.88	X	12.68	13.05	13.62	13.47	13.62	AR
5	Xia Zhiwei; China	11.11	11.54	11.29	11.43	X	11.38	11.54	
6	Sun Pengxiang; China	X	10.00	9.78	9.68	9.58	-	10.00	
7	Iosefo Rakesa; Fiji	7.64	X	9.63	9.62	9.82	9.18	9.82	
8	Egidijus Valciukas; Lithuania	9.50	9.35	X	9.51	9.60	X	9.60	

=== F46 ===
Rank	Athlete	1	2	3	4	5	6	Best	Notes
1st place, gold medalist(s)	Joshua Cinnamo; United States	16.80	16.18	X	15.73	15.63	X	16.80	WR
2nd place, silver medalist(s)	Greg Stewart; Canada	15.13	15.84	15.87	15.29	15.55	16.30	16.30	PB
3rd place, bronze medalist(s)	Nikita Prokhorov; Russia	15.01	15.48	X	X	15.54	X	15.54	SB
4	Wei Enlong; China	14.97	15.18	15.20	15.41	15.28	15.43	15.43	
5	Mathias Uwe Schulze; Germany	13.18	14.26	14.83	14.81	14.50	15.26	15.26	SB
6	Andrius Skuja; Lithuania	14.56	X	X	14.04	14.74	14.06	14.74	PB
7	Ravil Mansurbayev; Kazakhstan	13.76	13.77	14.49	14.11	14.50	14.53	14.53	SB
8	Hou Zhanbiao; China	13.71	X	14.44	X	13.94	14.34	14.44	
9	AJ Ortega Abello; Venezuela	X	14.24	13.92				14.24	
10	Mohd Yasser Mohd Yasser; India	13.73	13.76	14.04				14.04	
11	Abdullah Alsaleh; Kuwait	13.44	13.58	13.08				13.58	
12	Kerwin Noemdo; South Africa	13.17	12.58	X				13.17	
13	Hamza Dogan; Turkey	X	12.12	11.89				12.12	
14	Evangelos Martos; Cyprus	11.81	11.50	11.92				11.92	
	Dmytro Ibragimov; Ukraine	X	X	-					NM

=== F53 ===
Rank	Athlete	1	2	3	4	5	6	Best	Notes
1st place, gold medalist(s)	Ales Kisy; Czech Republic	X	6.97	7.42	X	7.63	7.93	7.93	SB
2nd place, silver medalist(s)	Scot Severn; United States	7.77	6.65	7.35	7.44	7.69	6.27	7.77	
3rd place, bronze medalist(s)	Alireza Mokhtari Hemami; Iran	7.62	X	X	7.64	X	X	7.64	
4	Che Jon Fernandes; Greece	7.25	X	X	X	6.85	6.14	7.25	
5	Toshie Oi; Japan	X	X	X	6.60	X	X	6.60	
6	Huang Kai-Lun; Chinese Taipei	5.22	5.23	X	X	5.19	5.31	5.31	
-	Alaa Abdulsalam; Syria	X	X	X	X	X	X	NM	
-	Marijan Presecan; Croatia	X	X	X	X	X	X	NM	

=== F55 ===
Rank	Athlete	1	2	3	4	5	6	Best	Notes
1st place, gold medalist(s)	Ruzhdi Ruzhdi; Bulgaria	11.68	11.83	12.13	11.96	12.25	12.00	12.25	
2nd place, silver medalist(s)	Lech Stoltman; Poland	12.03	12.22	12.01	12.16	12.09	12.07	12.22	PB
3rd place, bronze medalist(s)	Nebojša Đurić; Serbia	11.97	11.99	12.08	11.90	11.97	12.15	12.15	PB
4	Sergei Sokulskii; Russia	10.45	10.60	10.74	10.66	10.88	11.11	11.11	AR
5	Karol Kozun; Poland	10.31	10.75	10.59	X	10.80	10.95	10.95	PB
6	Mourad Bachir; Algeria	10.79	X	10.80	X	X	X	10.80	
7	Damian Ligeza; Poland	10.17	10.31	10.47	10.33	10.52	10.80	10.80	PB
8	Dzevad Pandzic; Bosnia and Herzegovina	9.90	10.39	10.27	9.77	9.95	10.41	10.41	PB
9	Ramunas Verbavicius; Lithuania	10.12	9.79	9.59	10.13	9.90	10.14	10.14	
10	Francisco Leonardo Cedeno Almengor; Panama	9.54	9.63	9.06	X	9.94	X	9.94	
11	Georgi Kiryakov; Bulgaria	X	9.20	X	9.45	X	X	9.45	
12	Christian Cobe; Cameroon	8.90	9.26	9.27	9.17	9.27	8.87	9.27	

=== F57 ===
Rank	Athlete	1	2	3	4	5	6	Best	Notes
1st place, gold medalist(s)	Thiago Paulino dos Santos; Brazil	13.46	14.47	14.68	14.50	14.59	14.51	14.68	
2nd place, silver medalist(s)	Mohamad Mohamad; Syria	14.29	X	14.17	X	13.91	13.60	14.29	PB
3rd place, bronze medalist(s)	Wu Guoshan; China	12.70	X	13.50	13.96	13.60	14.21	14.21	SB
4	Samir Nabiyev; Azerbaijan	14.06	13.13	13.75	X	13.23	13.94	14.06	PB
5	Janusz Rokicki; Poland	12.65	13.35	13.35	12.49	13.31	13.61	13.61	
6	Sujith Kuniya Puyil; India	11.86	13.03	X	12.54	12.93	X	13.03	
7	Soman Rana; India	12.79	X	12.48	12.79	12.66	12.33	12.79	
8	Michael Wishnia; United States	12.74	X	12.35	12.38	12.46	12.72	12.74	
9	David Fernandez Fernandez; Spain	11.83	11.65	12.21	X	X	11.73	12.21	
10	Amer Ali Mustafa Abdelaziz; Jordan	11.15	11.80	11.90	11.78	11.72	11.78	11.90	
11	Bhagat Singh; India	X	11.17	11.24	X	11.13	11.16	11.24	
12	Jaroslav Petrous; Poland	10.08	X	9.75	9.75	9.92	X	10.08	

=== F63 ===
Rank	Athlete	1	2	3	4	5	6	Best	Notes
1st place, gold medalist(s)	Aled Davies; United Kingdom	X	14.66	15.10	15.32	14.93	14.91	15.32	
2nd place, silver medalist(s)	Tom Habscheid; Luxembourg	14.85	14.20	15.10	14.73	14.77	14.70	15.10	WR
3rd place, bronze medalist(s)	Sajad Mohammadian; Iran	13.48	14.13	13.37	X	14.39	13.46	14.39	
4	Pang Baolong; China	12.90	13.27	13.79	13.55	13.56	X	13.79	AR
5	Mukhammad Rikhsimov; Uzbekistan	X	12.97	13.31	12.88	X	13.49	13.49	PB
6	Badr Touzi; France	X	13.19	13.40	13.43	12.76	12.92	13.43	PB
7	Tyrone Pillay; South Africa	12.50	13.36	X	12.85	13.27	X	13.36	AR
8	Palitha Halgahawela; Sri Lanka	11.78	12.30	12.30	12.37	X	11.93	12.37	
9	Dechko Ovcharov; Bulgaria	10.80	10.39	X				10.80	

== See also ==
- List of IPC world records in athletics
