= 2017 World Para Athletics Championships – Men's shot put =

The men's shot put at the 2017 World Para Athletics Championships was held at the Olympic Stadium in London from 14 to 23 July.

== Medalists ==
Event	Gold		Silver		Bronze	
F12	Saman Pakbaz; Iran	15.82 SB	Roman Danyliuk; Ukraine	15.61	Kim Lopez Gonzalez; Spain	15.44 SB
F20	Muhammad Ziyad Zolkefli; Malaysia	17.29 WR	Stalin David Mosquera; Ecuador	16.72 AR	Todd Hodgetts; Australia	15.96
F32	Lahouari Bahlaz; Algeria	11.08 WR	Mohammed Al Mashaykhi; Oman	10.49 AR	Dimitrios Zisidis; Greece	9.57 PB
F33	Kamel Kardjena; Algeria	10.33	Daniel Scheil; Germany	10.36	Giuseppe Campoccio; Italy	9.60
F34	Abdulrahman Abdulqadir; Qatar	11.38 SB	Mohsen Kaedi; Iran	10.93	Mauricio Valencia; Colombia	10.89 SB
F35	Fu Xinhan; China	15.30 CR	Mehran Nikoee Majd; Iran	15.15 PB	Seyed Aliasghar Javanmardi; Iran	15.13 PB
F36	Sebastian Dietz; Germany	15.28 CR	Li Cuiqing; China	14.93 AR	Mykola Dibrova; Ukraine	13.59
F37	Mindaugas Bilius; Lithuania	16.26 CR	Khusniddin Norbekov; Uzbekistan	14.87	Donatas Dundzys; Lithuania	13.13 PB
F38	Cameron Crombie; Australia	15.95 WR	Javad Hardani; Iran	14.13	Victor Svanesohn; Sweden	13.63 PB
F40	Garrah Tnaiash; Iraq	10.49 SB	Miguel Monteiro; Portugal	9.86 PB	Chen Zhenyu; China	9.82 SB
F41	Niko Kappel; Germany	13.81 WR	Kyron Duke; Great Britain	12.28 SB	Xia Zhiwei; China	11.86 SB
F42	Aled Davies; Great Britain	17.52 WR	Sajad Mohammadian; Iran	14.44 SB	Frank Tinnemeier; Germany	13.87
F44	Akeem Stewart; Trinidad and Tobago	19.08 WR	Adrian Matusik; Slovakia	15.99	Ibrahim Ahmed Abdelwareth; Egypt	15.65 AR
F46	Wei Enlong; China	15.28	Matthias Uwe Schulze; Germany	14.93 PB	Hou Zhanbiao; China	13.59 SB
F53	Alireza Mokhtari; Iran	8.35 AR	Scot Severn; United States	8.13 SB	Asadollah Azimi; Iran	7.96
F55	Ruzhdi Ruzhdi; Bulgaria	12.47 WR	Lech Stoltman; Poland	11.37 SB	Hamed Amiri (F54); Iran	11.17 CR
F57	Thiago Paulino dos Santos; Brazil	14.31 SB	Wu Guoshan; China	13.91 SB	Janusz Rokicki; Poland	13.76
WR world record | AR area record | CR championship record | GR games record | NR national record | OR Olympic record | PB personal best | SB season best | WL world leading (in a given season)

Events listed in pink were contested but no medals were awarded.

== See also ==
- List of IPC world records in athletics
