= Athletics at the 2016 Summer Paralympics – Men's shot put =

The Men's Shot Put athletics events for the 2016 Summer Paralympics took place at the Rio Olympic Stadium from September 8 to September 17, 2016. A total of 14 events are contested incorporating 17 different classifications.

== Schedule ==
Event↓/Date →	Thu 8	Fri 9	Sat 10	Sun 11	Mon 12	Tue 13	Wed 14	Thu 15	Fri 16	Sat 17
F12 Shot Put	F									
F20 Shot Put			F							
F32 Shot Put	F									
F33 Shot Put			F							
F34 Shot Put				F						
F35 Shot Put					F					
F36 Shot Put									F	
F37 Shot Put							F			
F40 Shot Put									F	
F41 Shot Put	F									
F42 Shot Put					F					
F53 Shot Put							F			
F55 Shot Put									F	
F57 Shot Put										F

== Medal summary ==
Classification	Gold		Silver		Bronze	
F12 (inc F11)	Kim Lopez Gonzalez; Spain	16.44 PB	Saman Pakbaz; Iran	15.98 PB	Roman Danyliuk; Ukraine	15.94 SB
F20	Muhammad Ziyad Zolkefli; Malaysia	16.84 WR	Dimitrios Senikidis; Greece	16.17	Todd Hodgetts; Australia	15.82
F32	Athanasios Konstantinidis; Greece	10.39 WR	Lahouari Bahlaz; Algeria	9.40	Dimitrios Zisidis; Greece	9.24
F33	Daniel Scheil; Germany	11.03	Kamel Kardjena; Algeria	10.94	Hani Alnakhli; Saudi Arabia	8.99
F34	Azeddine Nouiri; Morocco	11.28 RR	Abdulrahman Abdulqadir Fiqi; Qatar	11.15 SB	Mauricio Valencia; Colombia	11.10 RR
F35	Fu Xinhan; China	15.19 PB	Hernan Emanuel Urra; Argentina	14.91 RR	Edgars Bergs; Latvia	14.55 RR
F36	Sebastian Dietz; Germany	14.84 PR	Mykola Dibrova; Ukraine	14.26 PB	Li Cuiqing; China	14.02
F37	Mindaugas Bilius; Lithuania	16.80 RR	Xia Dong; China	16.06 SB	Khusniddin Norbekov; Uzbekistan	15.17 PB
F40	Garrah Tnaiash; Iraq	10.76 RR	Chen Zhenyu; China	10.10 PB	Smaali Bouaabid; Tunisia	9.44 RR
F41	Niko Kappel; Germany	13.57 PB	Bartosz Tyszkowski; Poland	13.56	Zhiwei Xia; China	12.33
F42	Aled Davies; Great Britain	15.97 PR	Sajad Mohammadian; Iran	14.31 SB	Tyrone Pillay; South Africa	13.91 RR
F53	Che Jon Fernandes; Greece	8.44 RR	Scot Severn; United States	8.41 SB	Asadollah Azimi; Iran	8.14 RR
F55 (inc. F54)	Ruzhdi Ruzhdi; Bulgaria	12.33 WR	Hamed Amiri; Iran	11.40 WR	Lech Stoltman; Poland	11.39
F57 (inc. F56)	Wu Guoshan; China	14.42 SB	Janusz Rokicki; Poland	14.26	Javid Ehsani Shakib; Iran	14.13 PB

== Results ==
=== F12 ===
Incorporating F11.

Rank	Athlete	Nationality	Classification	1	2	3	4	5	6	Best	Notes
1st place, gold medalist(s)	Kim Lopez Gonzalez	Spain	F12	15.24	16.44	x	16.32	16.17	15.79	16.44	PB
2nd place, silver medalist(s)	Saman Pakbaz	Iran	F12	14.55	x	14.94	14.48	15.28	15.98	15.98	PB
3rd place, bronze medalist(s)	Roman Danyliuk	Ukraine	F12	15.47	x	15.94	15.87	15.21	15.27	15.94	SB
4	Mavlonbek Haydarov	Uzbekistan	F12	x	13.59	14.90	14.34	15.61	15.55	15.61	PB
5	Caio Vinicius da Silva Pereira	Brazil	F12	14.56	14.48	15.23	14.91	15.17	14.92	15.23	
6	Miljenko Vucic	Croatia	F12	14.40	14.89	14.69	14.55	14.67	15.07	15.07	PB
7	Russell Short	Australia	F12	14.02	13.63	15.01	14.14	x	14.66	15.01	
8	Hector Cabrera Llacer	Spain	F12	13.59	x	x	x	13.75	13.52	13.75	PB
9	Oney Tapia	Italy	F11	11.88	12.72	12.59	-	-	-	12.72	
10	Alessandro Rodrigo Silva	Brazil	F11	12.23	12.07	12.43	-	-	-	12.43	

=== F20 ===
Rank	Athlete	Nationality	1	2	3	4	5	6	Best	Notes
1st place, gold medalist(s)	Muhammad Ziyad Zolkefli	Malaysia	16.40	15.94	15.82	16.29	16.84	-	16.84	WR
2nd place, silver medalist(s)	Dimitrios Senikidis	Greece	15.51	16.06	16.17	16.12	15.78	16.01	16.17	
3rd place, bronze medalist(s)	Todd Hodgetts	Australia	14.54	15.42	14.84	15.10	15.28	15.82	15.82	
4	Efstratios Nikolaidis	Greece	x	15.64	15.69	15.26	14.76	x	15.69	PB
5	Jeffrey Ige	Sweden	14.24	14.25	14.94	15.30	x	15.08	15.30	
6	Stalin David Mosquera	Ecuador	x	13.59	13.43	14.23	14.30	14.79	14.79	
7	Damien Rumeau	France	11.17	12.29	13.46	x	12.68	11.32	13.46	PB

=== F32 ===
The Men's shot put F32 was contested as a straight final on September 8, 2016. 12 athletes, representing 8 nations, took part in the final

Rank	Athlete	Nationality	1	2	3	4	5	6	Best	Notes
1st place, gold medalist(s)	Athanasios Konstantinidis	Greece	9.83	10.09	x	9.40	10.15	10.39	10.39	WR PR ER
2nd place, silver medalist(s)	Lahouari Bahlaz	Algeria	x	x	8.81	9.40	x	x	9.40	
3rd place, bronze medalist(s)	Dimitrios Zisidis	Greece	8.66	8.80	9.24	x	x	7.67	9.24	PB
4	Maciej Sochal	Poland	7.64	x	7.59	7.42	8.60	7.47	8.60	
5	Younes Seifipour	Iran	x	8.18	8.40	7.56	7.33	x	8.40	
6	Abderrahim Missouni	Algeria	8.17	7.61	8.06	7.80	8.02	7.35	8.17	
7	Mohammad Nasser	Kuwait	7.17	7.23	7.67	x	7.13	x	7.67	
8	Youssef Ouaddali	Morocco	x	'7.56	x	x	x	6.99	7.56	
9	Karim Betina	Algeria	x	7.27	x	-	-	-	7.27	
10	Nikolaos Gonios	Greece	x	7.00	x	-	-	-	7.00	
-	Mohammed Al Mashaykhi	Oman	x	x	x	-	-	-	NM	
-	Abdennacer Feidi	Tunisia	x	x	x	-	-	-	NM	

=== F33 ===
Rank	Athlete	Nationality	1	2	3	4	5	6	Best	Notes
1st place, gold medalist(s)	Daniel Scheil	Germany	11.03	10.96	10.65	10.29	10.26	10.62	11.03	SB
2nd place, silver medalist(s)	Kamel Kardjena	Algeria	10.94	7.56	10.46	10.43	10.53	10.94	10.94	AR
3rd place, bronze medalist(s)	Hani Alnakhli	Saudi Arabia	8.78	8.70	8.78	8.99	8.69	x	8.99	SB
4	Jessee Wyatt	Australia	8.37	8.55	8.59	8.51	8.71	8.31	8.71	AR
5	Kieran Tscherniawsky	Great Britain	8.49	x	8.42	8.18	8.28	8.32	8.49	
6	Abdulaziz Alshkeili	United Arab Emirates	x	x	x	8.08	8.02	8.01	8.08	SB
7	Ahmed Alhosani	United Arab Emirates	7.55	6.30	x	6.83	x	7.49	7.55	SB

=== F34 ===
Rank	Athlete	1	2	3	4	5	6	Best	Notes
1st place, gold medalist(s)	Azeddine Nouiri (MAR)	10.97	10.74	11.01	11.25	11.28	11.16	11.28	RR
2nd place, silver medalist(s)	Abdulrahman Abdulqadir Fiqi (QAT)	x	11.15	11.01	10.75	10.55	10.94	11.15	SB
3rd place, bronze medalist(s)	Mauricio Valencia (COL)	10.48	10.12	10.33	10.83	10.55	11.10	11.10	RR
4	Wang Yanzhang (CHN)	10.57	10.86	10.35	10.35	10.57	10.70	10.86	
5	Mohsen Kaedi (IRI)	x	10.42	10.59	x	x	10.70	10.70	SB
6	Siamak Saleh-Farajzadeh (IRI)	10.36	10.65	x	10.23	10.17	10.39	10.65	SB
7	Abdullah Hayayei (UAE)	x	x	9.74	x	x	x	9.74	
8	Diego Meneses (COL)	8.66	8.68	8.63	8.63	8.49	8.81	8.81	
9	Arystanbek Bazarkulov (KGZ)							7.39	SB

=== F35 ===
This event took place on Sunday 11 September 2016 at 10:04, local time

Rank	Athlete	Nationality	1	2	3	4	5	6	Best	Notes
1st place, gold medalist(s)	Fu Xinhan	China	14.76	15.19	14.70	15.18	14.76	-	15.19	PB
2nd place, silver medalist(s)	Hernán Emanuel Urra	Argentina	14.62	14.46	14.65	14.34	14.91	14.56	14.91	RR
3rd place, bronze medalist(s)	Edgars Bergs	Latvia	13.52	13.88	14.55	14.20	14.04	14.35	14.55	RR
4	Mehran Nikoee Majd	Iran	13.38	13.54	14.32	14.02	13.39	14.54	14.54	PB
5	S Hosseinipanah	Iran	...13.14	12.64	x	13.00	13.12	x	13.14	
6	Sam Ruddock	Great Britain	12.32	x	12.69	12.70	12.39	12.6	12.70	

=== F36 ===
Rank	Athlete	Nationality	1	2	3	4	5	6	Best	Notes
1st place, gold medalist(s)	Sebastian Dietz	Germany	12.28	14.32	14.80	14.69	14.84	14.63	14.84	PR
2nd place, silver medalist(s)	Mykola Dibrova	Ukraine	14.26	13.97	13.25	12.56	13.96	13.46	14.26	PB
3rd place, bronze medalist(s)	Li Cuiqing	China	13.69	13.82	14.02	11.20	13.50	13.64	14.02	
4	Rufat Rafiyev	Azerbaijan	13.56	13.22	13.66	13.18	12.62	13.72	13.72	PB
5	Paweł Piotrowski	Poland	13.34	x	x	13.12	x	12.93	13.34	
6	Jihed Zaabi	Tunisia	12.83	12.83	12.18	12.10	x	12.47	12.83	AR
7	Saeed Mubarak	United Arab Emirates	9.86	11.46	10.36	11.87	11.25	11.01	11.87	PB

=== F37 ===
Rank	Athlete	Nationality	1	2	3	4	5	6	Best	Notes
1st place, gold medalist(s)	Mindaugas Bilius	Lithuania	15.64	15.86	14.68	16.23	16.80	16.53	16.80	AR
2nd place, silver medalist(s)	Xia Dong	China	15.70	15.57	15.97	16.00	16.06	x	16.06	SB
3rd place, bronze medalist(s)	Khusniddin Norbekov	Uzbekistan	13.14	15.01	15.17	15.10	14.58	x	15.17	PB
4	Mykola Zhabnyak	Ukraine	13.45	13.97	13.98	14.05	14.23	x	14.23	PB
5	João Victor Teixeira de Souza Silva	Brazil	12.81	13.54	x	12.99	12.74	12.42	13.54	AR
6	Tomasz Blatkiewicz	Poland	12.25	x	12.42	x	x	12.61	12.61	

=== F40 ===
Rank	Athlete	Nationality	1	2	3	4	5	6	Best	Notes
1st place, gold medalist(s)	Garrah Tnaiash	Iraq	10.36	10.33	10.02	10.76	10.12	10.53	10.76	AR
2nd place, silver medalist(s)	Chen Zhenyu	China	9.64	9.99	10.09	9.92	10.10	9.91	10.10	PB
3rd place, bronze medalist(s)	Smaali Bouaabid	Tunisia	9.01	8.43	8.69	8.85	9.44	8.71	9.44	AR
4	Lin Keli	China	8.48	8.62	9.16	8.66	8.87	8.83	9.16	
5	Miguel Marques Monteiro	Portugal	8.54	8.30	8.62	8.52	8.50	8.89	8.89	PB
6	Benian Richard Duffi	Ivory Coast	8.31	8.44	8.39	8.77	8.80	x	8.80	PB
7	Wang Wei	China	8.44	8.50	8.35	7.83	x	8.26	8.50	
8	Matija Sloup	Croatia	x	8.27	8.25	7.77	x	7.97	8.27	
9	Muhammad Diroy Noordin	Singapore	7.10	7.25	7.29				7.29	
10	Abdullah Alsaif	Kuwait	6.75	x	6.44				6.75	

=== F41 ===
Rank	Athlete	Nationality	1	2	3	4	5	6	Best	Notes
1st place, gold medalist(s)	Niko Kappel	Germany	12.37	13.15	13.38	13.13	13.57	13.53	13.57	PB
2nd place, silver medalist(s)	Bartosz Tyszkowski	Poland	13.34	13.31	13.56	13.43	13.09	13.27	13.56	
3rd place, bronze medalist(s)	Zhiwei Xia	China	12.11	12.31	12.20	x	12.33	x	12.33	AR
4	Jonathan De Souza Santos	Brazil	11.37	11.71	11.63	x	x	11.58	11.71	
5	Kyron Duke	Great Britain	10.80	11.41	x	10.65	x	11.40	11.41	
6	Sun Pengxiang	China	10.52	10.45	10.33	10.55	10.54	10.85	10.85	PB
7	Mohamed Amara	Tunisia	10.55	10.74	9.72	10.65	10.10	9.73	10.74	AR

=== F42 ===
Rank	Athlete	Nationality	1	2	3	4	5	6	Best	Notes
1st place, gold medalist(s)	Aled Davies	Great Britain	14.85	15.31	15.97	15.89	15.63	x	15.97	PR
2nd place, silver medalist(s)	Sajad Mohammadian	Iran	13.26	14.31	13.71	13.92	x	x	14.31	SB
3rd place, bronze medalist(s)	Tyrone Pillay	South Africa	12.75	12.56	13.66	x	x	13.91	13.91	AR
4	Mauro Evaristo de Sousa	Brazil	13.24	13.12	12.84	x	12.83	13.59	13.59	AR
5	Frank Tinnemeier	Germany	12.90	12.09	12.47	12.84	x	13.44	13.44	
6	Mladen Tomić	Croatia	12.07	11.96	12.85	12.48	13.04	13.29	13.29	PB
7	Tom Habscheid	Luxembourg	12.96	12.98	13.19	x	x	13.28	13.28	PB
8	Badr Touzi	France	11.26	13.09	13.25	12.81	12.68	13.09	13.25	
9	Kang Guofeng	China	x	x	12.84				12.84	
	Waleed Ashteebah	Libya							DNS	

=== F53 ===
Rank	Athlete	Nationality	1	2	3	4	5	6	Best	Notes
1st place, gold medalist(s)	Che Jon Fernandes	Greece	8.44	8.39	8.22	6.59	8.22	8.13	8.44	AR
2nd place, silver medalist(s)	Scot Severn	United States	8.27	8.37	8.15	8.05	7.99	8.41	8.41	SB
3rd place, bronze medalist(s)	Asadollah Azimi	Iran	7.47	8.06	8.14	7.49	7.55	x	8.14	AR
4	Alireza Mokhtari Hemami	Iran	7.56	7.00	7.69	7.83	7.87	x	7.87	SB
5	Aleš Kisý	Czech Republic	7.53	7.30	7.81	7.16	7.53	7.59	7.81	SB
6	Erick Ortiz Monroy	Mexico	6.45	6.58	6.55	6.60	6.66	6.70	6.70	
7	Toshie Oi	Japan	6.33	6.42	x	6.26	6.48	x	6.48	SB
8	Husam Azzam	Palestine	x	x	6.34	5.63	x	x	6.34	SB
9	Marijan Presečan	Croatia	6.25	x	5.92				6.25	
10	Alphanso Cunningham	Jamaica	x	5.84	5.58				5.84	SB

=== F55 (incorporating F54) ===
Rank	Athlete	Nationality	Class	1	2	3	4	5	6	Best	Notes
1st place, gold medalist(s)	Ruzhdi Ruzhdi	Bulgaria	F55	12.33	12.22	12.19	11.54	11.84	12.12	12.33	WR
2nd place, silver medalist(s)	Hamed Amiri	Iran	F54	11.26	x	x	10.62	11.40	11.11	11.40	WR
3rd place, bronze medalist(s)	Lech Stoltman	Poland	F55	11.01	11.09	11.27	11.39	11.33	10.91	11.39	
4	Karol Kozuń	Poland	F55	10.99	11.22	11.33	10.97	11.10	11.17	11.33	
5	Nebojša Đurić	Serbia	F55	11.28	11.07	11.29	10.61	10.15	10.96	11.29	
6	Jalil Bagheri Jeddi	Iran	F55	11.02	11.00	10.34	10.89	10.82	11.16	11.16	SB
7	Miloš Zarić	Serbia	F55	10.73	10.70	11.05	10.67	10.69	10.25	11.05	
8	Christian Gobé	Cameroon	F55	10.28	x	10.13	9.75	9.97	9.93	10.28	
9	Dževad Pandžić	Bosnia and Herzegovina	F55	x	9.87	10.09				10.09	
10	Wallace Santos	Brazil	F55	8.95	9.07	9.19				9.19	
11	Francisco Leonardo Cedeño Almengor	Panama	F55	9.16	x	8.73				9.16	
12	Ignas Madumla Mtweve	Tanzania	F55	5.01	x	4.63				5.01	SB
	Ricardo Nunes	Brazil	F55							DNS	

=== F57 ===
Rank	Athlete	Nationality	1	2	3	4	5	6	Best	Notes
1st place, gold medalist(s)	Wu Guoshan	China	14.00	14.42	x	x	x	–	14.42	SB
2nd place, silver medalist(s)	Janusz Rokicki	Poland	13.89	14.21	14.26	14.17	14.17	14.20	14.26	
3rd place, bronze medalist(s)	Javid Ehsani Shakib	Iran	13.53	x	x	13.26	13.51	14.13	14.13	=PB
4	Michael Wishnia	United States	13.92	12.88	13.69	13.02	14.03	13.18	14.03	
5	Thiago Paulino Santos	Brazil	13.23	13.92	x	12.21	13.33	13.29	13.92	
6	Mohamad Mohamad	Syria	13.91	12.87	x	13.02	x	13.12	13.91	SB
7	Samir Nabiyev	Azerbaijan	13.67	13.26	13.47	13.05	11.80	13.30	13.67	
8	Virender	India	x	11.02	11.39	10.88	11.62	x	11.62	
9	Roddy-Michaël Stéphane Mokolongo	Central African Republic	x	7.17	6.83				7.17	SB
	Jean Indris Santerre	Haiti							DNS	
