= 2015 IPC Athletics World Championships – Men's shot put =

The men's shot put at the 2015 IPC Athletics World Championships was held at the Suheim Bin Hamad Stadium in Doha from 22–31 October.

== Medalists ==
Event	Gold		Silver		Bronze	
F12	Roman Danyliuk; Ukraine	16.64 WR	Saman Pakbaz; Iran	15.19 PB	Kim Lopez Gonzalez; Spain	15.03SB
F20	Todd Hodgetts; Australia	15.83 CR	Dimitrios Senikidis; Greece	15.45 PB	Muhammad Ziyad Zolkefli; Malaysia	15.37
F32	Vladislav Frolov; Russia	9.70 SB	Karim Betina; Algeria	7.83 SB	Dimitrios Zisidis; Greece	7.79
F33	Evgenii Malykh; Russia	12.36 PB	Aleksandr Khrupin; Russia	11.52 SB	Daniel Scheil; Germany	10.93
F34	Siamak Saleh Farajzadeh; Iran	11.52 WR	Mohsen Kaedi; Iran	11.12	Mauricio Valencia; Colombia	10.93 SB
F35	Seyedmohsen Hosseinipanah; Iran	14.02 PB	Edgars Bergs; Latvia	14.00 SB	Alexander El'Min; Russia	13.87
F36	Sebastian Dietz; Germany	14.87 CR	Vladimir Sviridov; Russia	14.79	Li Cuiqing; China	14.52 AR
F37	Xia Dong; China	15.94	Mindaugas Bilius; Lithuania	15.35 SB	Khusniddin Norbekov; Uzbekistan	14.57 PB
F38	Oleksandr Doroshenko; Ukraine	14.71	Reinhardt Hamman; South Africa	13.37	Dusan Grezl; Czech Republic	12.05
F40	Garrah Tnaiash; Iraq	10.66 AR	Dmitry Dushkin; Russia	10.61 PB	Chen Zhenyu; China	9.83 PB
F41	Bartosz Tyszkowski; Poland	13.43 PB	Niko Kappel; Germany	12.85 PB	Jonathan de Souza Santos; Brazil	12.32 PB
F42	Aled Davies; Great Britain	14.95 CR	Sajad Mohammadian; Iran	14.54 AR	Frank Tinnemeier; Germany	14.33 PB
F44	Adrian Matusik; Slovakia	17.19 PB	Jackie Christiansen; Denmark	17.18	David Blair; United States	15.49 AR
F46	Nikita Prokhorov; Russia	15.67 SB	Wei Enlong; China	15.52	Dmytro Ibragimov; Ukraine	15.05
F53	Che Jon Fernandes; Greece	8.35 AR	Scot Severn; Russia	8.14	Ales Kisy; Czech Republic	7.69 SB
F55	Ruzhdi Ruzhdi; Bulgaria	11.81 CR	Miloš Zarić; Serbia	11.49 PB	Karol Kozun; Poland	11.47 SB
F57	Janusz Rokicki; Poland	14.92 SB	Alexey Ashapatov; Russia	14.56 SB	Wu Guoshan; China	14.53 AR
WR world record | AR area record | CR championship record | GR games record | NR national record | OR Olympic record | PB personal best | SB season best | WL world leading (in a given season)

== See also ==
- List of IPC world records in athletics
