= 2016 IPC Athletics European Championships – Men's shot put =

The men's shot put at the 2016 IPC Athletics European Championships was held at the Stadio Olimpico Carlo Zecchini in Grosseto from 11–16 June.

== Medalists ==
Event	Gold		Silver		Bronze	
F12	Kim Lopez Gonzalez; Spain	15.62	Miljenko Vucic; Croatia	14.43	Yury Buchkou; Belarus	13.42
F20	Dimitrios Senikidis; Greece	15.46 PB	Efstratios Nikolaidis; Greece	15.04 PB	Jeffrey Ige; Sweden	15.01 SB
F32	Vladislav Frolov; Russia	9.77 CR	Maciej Sochal; Poland	8.37 SB	Dimitrios Zisidis; Greece	8.34
F33	Aleksandr Khrupin; Russia	10.06	Daniel Scheil; Germany	9.94	—	
F34	Nikita Oblepov; Russia	9.21 CR	Radmilo Baranin; Montenegro	8.72 PB	Sergei Diorditca; Russia	8.28
F35	Alexander Elmin; Russia	14.06 CR	Sam Ruddock; Great Britain	13.65 SB	Tomasz Paulinski; Poland	12.94 SB
F36	Vladimir Sviridov; Russia	15.34 WR	Sebastian Dietz; Germany	14.63	Pawel Piotrowski; Poland	13.42 SB
F37	Mindaugas Bilius; Lithuania	16.07 ER	Dmitrijs Silovs; Latvia	13.17 PB	Donatas Dundzys; Lithuania	13.12 PB
F38	Dušan Grézl; Czech Republic	12.14	Victor Svanesohn; Sweden	12.03	—	
F40/F41	Bartosz Tyszkowski (F41); Poland	13.64 WR; 1042 pts	Niko Kappel (F41); Germany	13.23 PB; 1016 pts	Dmitry Dushkin (F40); Russia	10.83 WR; 980 pts
F42	Aled Davies; Great Britain	16.11 CR	Badr Touzi; France	13.35 PB	Tom Habscheid; Luxembourg	12.98
F44	Ivan Katanušić; Croatia	15.69 PB	Adrian Matusik; Slovakia	15.59 SB	—	
F46	Andrius Skuja; Lithuania	13.84 PB	Matthias Uwe Schulze; Germany	13.37	—	
F53	Che Jon Fernandes; Greece	7.93	Ales Kisy; Czech Republic	7.64	—	
F55	Ruzhdi Ruzhdi; Bulgaria	12.04 WR	Nebojša Đurić; Serbia	11.05	Lech Stoltman; Poland	10.75
F57	Janusz Rokicki; Poland	14.72 CR	Alexey Ashapatov; Russia	13.90	Aleksi Kirjonen (F56); Finland	12.18
WR world record | AR area record | CR championship record | GR games record | NR national record | OR Olympic record | PB personal best | SB season best | WL world leading (in a given season)

== See also ==
- List of IPC world records in athletics
