= 2018 World Para Athletics European Championships – Men's shot put =

The men's shot put at the 2018 World Para Athletics European Championships was held at the Friedrich-Ludwig-Jahn-Sportpark in Berlin from 20 to 26 August. 17 classification finals are held in all over this event.

== Medalists ==
Event	Gold		Silver		Bronze	
F11	Oney Tapia (ITA)	12.48	Bil Marinkovic (AUT)	11.09	Miroslaw Madzia (POL)	10.82
F12	Roman Danyliuk (UKR)	15.34	Kim Lopez Gonzalez (ESP)	14.80	Miljenko Vucic (CRO)	14.20
F20	Maksym Koval (UKR)	15.44	Jeffrey Ige (SWE)	14.59	Efstratios Nikolaidis (GRE)	14.41
F32	Maciej Sochal (POL)	8.22	no medal awarded			
F33	Giuseppe Campoccia (ITA)	11.17	Deni Černi (CRO)	10.10	Michal Glab (POL)	9.57
F34	Tomasz Paulinski (POL)	11.00 ER	Thierry Cibone (FRA)	9.75	Oleksandr Aliekseienko (ISR)	8.56
F35	Edgars Bergs (LAT)	14.03 CR	Quentin Desclefs (BEL)	8.09	no medal awarded	
F36	Sebastian Dietz (GER)	15.28 CR	Mykola Dibrova (UKR)	13.26	Pawel Piotrowski (BLR)	12.75
F37	Apostolos Charitonidis (GRE)	15.28 CR	Mykola Zhabnyak (UKR)	13.78	Donatas Dundzys (LTU)	13.38
F40	Matija Sloup (CRO)	9.87	Miguel Monteiro (POR)	9.69	Take Zonneveld (NED)	8.64
F41	Bartosz Tyszkowski (POL)	14.04 WR	Niko Kappel (GER)	12.60	Egidijus Valciukas (LTU)	8.73
F46	Mathias Uwe Schulze (GER)	14.94	Dmytro Ibragimov (UKR)	14.63	Andrius Skuja (LTU)	14.20
F54	Jean-Francois Maitre (FRA)	9.65	Ales Kisy (CZE)	9.17	Drazenko Mitrovic (SRB)	9.17
F55	Ruzhdi Ruzhdi (BUL)	12.14 CR	Nebojša Đurić (SRB)	11.67	Karol Kozun (POL)	10.36
F57	Janusz Rokicki (POL)	13.90 CR	Samir Nabiyev (AZE)	13.54	Damian Kulig (POL)	11.63
F63	Aled Davies (GBR)	15.49 CR	Tom Habscheid (LUX)	14.03	Badr Touzi (FRA)	12.88
WR world record | AR area record | CR championship record | GR games record | NR national record | OR Olympic record | PB personal best | SB season best | WL world leading (in a given season)

== See also ==
- List of IPC world records in athletics

== See also ==
- List of IPC world records in athletics
