= Lech Stoltman =

Polish Paralympic athlete

Personal information
- Born: 2 February 1985 (age 41) Bytów, Poland

Sport
- Country: Poland
- Sport: Para-athletics
- Disability: Spinal cord injuries
- Disability class: F55
- Event: Shot put
Medal record
Paralympic Games
Bronze medal – third place	2016 Rio de Janeiro	Shot put F55
Bronze medal – third place	2020 Tokyo	Shot put F55
Bronze medal – third place	2024 Paris	Shot put F55
World Championships
Silver medal – second place	2017 London	Shot put F55
Silver medal – second place	2019 Dubai	Shot put F55
Silver medal – second place	2023 Paris	Shot put F55
Bronze medal – third place	2025 New Delhi	Shot put F55
European Championships
Silver medal – second place	2021 Bydgoszcz	Shot put F55
Bronze medal – third place	2016 Grosseto	Shot put F55

Lech Stoltman (born 2 February 1985) is a Polish Paralympic athlete competing in F55-classification shot put events. He represented Poland at the 2016 Summer Paralympics held in Rio de Janeiro, Brazil, and he won the bronze medal in the men's shot put F55 event. Stoltman also won the bronze medal in this event at the 2020 Summer Paralympics held in Tokyo, Japan, and the 2024 Summer Paralympics held in Paris, France.

== Career ==
At the 2016 IPC Athletics European Championships held in Grosseto, Italy, Stoltman won the bronze medal in the men's shot put F55 event.

At the 2017 World Para Athletics Championships held in London, United Kingdom, he won the silver medal in the men's shot put F55 event. At the 2019 World Para Athletics Championships held in Dubai, United Arab Emirates, he also won the silver medal in this event. As a result, he qualified to represent Poland at the 2020 Summer Paralympics in Tokyo, Japan, in the men's shot put F55 event.

== Achievements ==
Year	Competition	Venue	Position	Event	Notes
Representing Poland
2016	European Championships	Grosseto, Italy	3rd	Shot put	10.75 m
2016	Summer Paralympics	Rio de Janeiro, Brazil	3rd	Shot put	11.39 m
2017	World Championships	London, United Kingdom	2nd	Shot put	11.37 m
2019	World Championships	Dubai, United Arab Emirates	2nd	Shot put	12.22 m
2021	European Championships	Bydgoszcz, Poland	2nd	Shot put	12.07 m
2021	Summer Paralympics	Tokyo, Japan	3rd	Shot put	12.15 m
2023	World Championships	Paris, France	2nd	Shot put	12.27 m
2024	Summer Paralympics	Paris, France	3rd	Shot put	11.90 m
