= Mohamed Nadjib Amchi =

Algerian Paralympic athlete (born 1991)

Personal information
- Nationality: Algerian
- Born: 3 August 1991 (age 34)

Sport
- Country: Algeria
- Sport: Para athletics
- Disability class: F32
- Event: Shot put
Medal record
Men's para-athletics
Representing Algeria
World Championships
Bronze medal – third place	2019 Dubai	Shot put F32
Bronze medal – third place	2025 New Delhi	Shot put F32

Mohamed Nadjib Amchi (born 3 August 1991) is an Algerian para-athlete who specializes in shot put.

== Career ==
At the 2019 World Para Athletics Championships, held in Dubai, Amchi won the bronze medal in the shot put F32 event. He competed in the 2020 Summer Paralympics in the shot put F32, where he finished in fifth place.

In June 2025, Amchi competed in the World Para Athletics Grand Prix held in Cali, where he won the gold medal in the shot put F32 event. He competed in the 2025 World Para Athletics Championships held in New Delhi, where he won the bronze medal in the shot put F32 event.
