= Aleksandr Khrupin =

Russian para-athlete (born 1994)

Personal information
- Native name: Александр Хрупин
- Nationality: Russian
- Born: 13 June 1994 (age 32)

Sport
- Sport: Para-athletics
- Disability class: F33
- Event: shot put
Medal record
Men's para-athletics
Representing Neutral Paralympic Athletes
World Championships
Silver medal – second place	2025 New Delhi	Shot put F33
Representing Russia
World Championships
Gold medal – first place	2019 Dubai	Shot put F33
Silver medal – second place	2015 Doha	Shot put F33
European Championships
Gold medal – first place	2016 Grosseto	Shot put F33
Gold medal – first place	2021 Bydgoszcz	Shot put F33
Silver medal – second place	2014 Swansea	Shot put F33
Silver medal – second place	2014 Swansea	Javelin throw F34

Aleksandr Khrupin (Russian: Александр Хрупин; born 13 June 1994) is a Russian para-athlete specializing in shot put. He competed at the 2020 and 2024 Summer Paralympics. He is a World Champion and two-time European Champion.

== Career ==
Khrupin represented Russian Paralympic Committee athletes at the 2020 Summer Paralympics and finished in fourth place in the shot put F33 event with a throw of 11.21 metres. He then represented Neutral Paralympic Athletes at the 2024 Summer Paralympics and finished in fifth place in the shot put F33 event with a throw of 11.03 metres.

He competed at the 2019 World Para Athletics Championships and won a gold medal in the shot put F33 event with a throw of 11.21 metres. He competed at the 2025 World Para Athletics Championships and won a silver medal in the shot put F33 event.
