= Mehran Nikoee Majd =

Iranian para-athlete (born 1982)

Personal information
- Nationality: Iranian
- Born: 8 August 1982 (age 44)

Sport
- Sport: Para-athletics
- Disability class: F34
- Event: shot put
Medal record
Men's para-athletics
Representing Iran
World Championships
Gold medal – first place	2025 New Delhi	Shot put F34
Silver medal – second place	2017 London	Shot put F35
Silver medal – second place	2019 Dubai	Shot put F34
Asian Para Games
Gold medal – first place	2026 Aichi–Nagoya	Shot put F34

Mehran Nikoee Majd (born 8 August 1982) is an Iranian para-athlete specializing in shot put. He represented Iran at the 2016 Summer Paralympics.

== Career ==
Nikoee Majd represented Iran at the 2016 Summer Paralympics and finished in fourth place in the shot put F35 event with a personal best throw of 14.54 metres. He competed at the 2017 and 2019 World Para Athletics Championships, and won silver medals. In November 2021, it was announced he was suspended four years for anti-doping rule violation. The sample was collected out-of-competition from the athlete prior to the 2019 World Championships. He became eligible for competition in September 2024.

He returned to competition at the 2025 World Para Athletics Championships, and won a gold medal in shot put F34 event with a world record throw of 12.27 metres. In October 2026, he competed at the 2026 Asian Para Games and won a gold medal in the shot put F34 event with a throw of 11.90 metres.
