= Mykola Dibrova =

Ukrainian Paralympic athlete

Sport
- Country: Ukraine
- Sport: Para-athletics
- Disability: Cerebral palsy
- Disability class: F36
- Event: Shot put
Medal record
Paralympic Games
Silver medal – second place	2016 Rio de Janeiro	Shot put F36
World Championships
Bronze medal – third place	2017 London	Shot put F36
European Championships
Silver medal – second place	2018 Berlin	Shot put F36

Mykola Dibrova (Ukrainian: Микола Олегович Діброва; born 22 May 1996) is a Ukrainian Paralympic athlete with cerebral palsy. He represented Ukraine at the 2016 Summer Paralympics in Rio de Janeiro, Brazil and he won the silver medal in the men's shot put F36 event.

At the 2017 World Para Athletics Championships held in London, United Kingdom, he won the bronze medal in the men's shot put F36 event. At the 2018 European Championships held in Berlin, Germany, he won the silver medal in the men's shot put F36 event.

In 2019, he competed in the men's shot put F36 event at the 2019 World Para Athletics Championships held in Dubai, United Arab Emirates.

== Achievements ==
Year	Competition	Venue	Position	Event	Notes
Representing Ukraine
2016	Summer Paralympics	Rio de Janeiro, Brazil	2nd	Shot put	14.26 m
2017	World Championships	London, United Kingdom	3rd	Shot put	13.59 m
2018	European Championships	Berlin, Germany	2nd	Shot put	13.26 m
