= Niko Kappel =

German Paralympic athlete (born 1995)

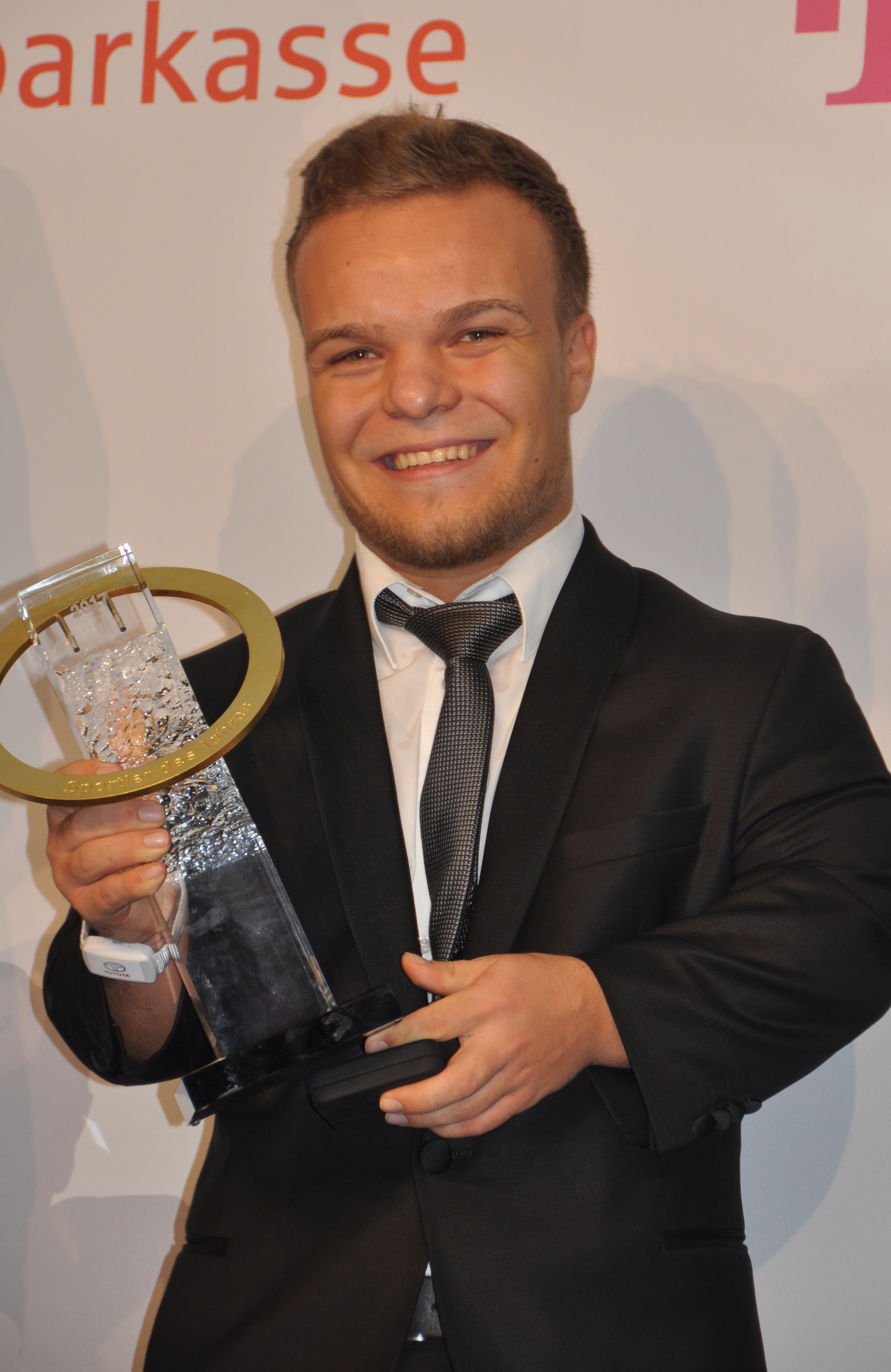

Personal information
- Born: 1 March 1995 (age 31) Schwäbisch Gmünd

Sport
- Country: Germany
- Sport: Para-athletics
- Disability: Short stature
- Disability class: F41
- Event: Shot put
Medal record
Paralympic Games
Gold medal – first place	2016 Rio de Janeiro	Shot put F41
Silver medal – second place	2024 Paris	Shot put F41
Bronze medal – third place	2020 Tokyo	Shot put F41
World Championships
Gold medal – first place	2017 London	Shot put F41
Gold medal – first place	2024 Kobe	Shot put F41
Gold medal – first place	2025 New Delhi	Shot put F41
Silver medal – second place	2015 Doha	Shot put F41
Silver medal – second place	2019 Dubai	Shot put F41
Silver medal – second place	2023 Paris	Shot put F41
European Championships
Silver medal – second place	2016 Grosseto	Shot put F40/F41
Silver medal – second place	2018 Berlin	Shot put F41
Bronze medal – third place	2021 Bydgoszcz	Shot put F41

Niko Kappel (born 1 March 1995) is a German Paralympic athlete of short stature. He represented Germany at the 2016 Summer Paralympics in Rio de Janeiro, Brazil and he won the gold medal in the men's shot put F41 event. He also represented Germany at the 2020 Summer Paralympics in Tokyo, Japan and he won the bronze medal in the men's shot put F41 event.

== Career ==
At the 2015 World Championships held in Doha, Qatar, he won the silver medal in the men's shot put F41 event. He also won the silver medal in the men's shot put F40/F41 event at the 2016 European Championships. At the 2017 World Championships he won the gold medal in the men's shot put F41 event and he won the silver medal in the men's shot put F41 event at the 2018 European Championships.

In 2016 and 2017, Kappel won the German Sportspersonality of the Year award in his category (male athletes with a disability).

He won the bronze medal in his event at the 2021 European Championships held in Bydgoszcz, Poland.

At the "Jump & Fly"-Meeting in Hechingen in May 2024, Kappel set the world record for shot put F41 with a distance of 15.07 meters, also making him the first shot put F41 athlete to surpass the 15.00 meter mark.

Kappel competed in the 2024 Paris Paralympic Games and won the silver medal in the men's shot put F41 event.
