= Wu Guoshan =

Chinese Paralympic athlete

Personal information
- Born: 8 January 1983 (age 43)

Sport
- Country: China
- Sport: Paralympic athletics
- Disability class: F57
- Event(s): Discus throw Shot put
Medal record
Paralympic Games
Gold medal – first place	2016 Rio de Janeiro	Shot put F57
Gold medal – first place	2020 Tokyo	Shot put F57
World Championships
Gold medal – first place	2015 Doha	Discus throw F57
Silver medal – second place	2017 London	Shot put F57
Bronze medal – third place	2015 Doha	Shot put F57
Bronze medal – third place	2017 London	Discus throw F57
Bronze medal – third place	2019 Dubai	Shot put F57
Asian Para Games
Gold medal – first place	2018 Jakarta	Discus throw F57
Gold medal – first place	2018 Jakarta	Shot put F57

Wu Guoshan (born 8 January 1983) is a Chinese Paralympic athlete. He represented China at the Summer Paralympics in 2012, 2016 and 2021. He won the gold medal in the men's shot put F57 event at both the 2016 Summer Paralympics and the 2020 Summer Paralympics.

He won two medals at the 2015 World Championships: the gold medal in the men's discus throw F57 event and the bronze medal in the men's shot put F57 event. Two years later, at the 2017 World Championships he also won two medals: the silver medal in the men's shot put F57 event and the bronze medal in the men's discus throw F57 event. In 2019, he won a bronze medal in the men's shot put F57 event at the 2019 World Championships held in Dubai, United Arab Emirates.
