= Javid Ehsani Shakib =

Iranian Paralympic athlete

Personal information
- Born: September 11, 1984 (age 41)

Sport
- Country: Iran
- Sport: Para-athletics
- Events: Discus throw; Shot put
Medal record
Paralympic Games
Bronze medal – third place	2016 Rio de Janeiro	Shot put F57
Asian Para Games
Gold medal – first place	2010 Guangzhou	Discus throw F57–58
Silver medal – second place	2014 Incheon	Shot put F57
Silver medal – second place	2018 Jakarta	Discus throw F57
Islamic Solidarity Games
Silver medal – second place	2017 Baku	Shot put F57

Javid Ehsani Shakib (born 11 September 1984) is an Iranian Paralympic athlete competing in discus throw and shot put events. He represented Iran at the 2016 Summer Paralympics held in Rio de Janeiro, Brazil and he won the bronze medal in the men's shot put F57 event.

== Career ==
He won the silver medal in the men's shot put F57 event at the 2017 Islamic Solidarity Games held in Baku, Azerbaijan.

He competed at the Asian Para Games on three occasions, winning a total of one gold medal and two silver medals. In 2010, he won the gold medal in the men's discus throw F57 event. In 2014, he won the silver medal in the men's shot put F57 event and in 2018, he won the silver medal in the men's discus throw F57 event.

== Achievements ==
Year	Competition	Venue	Position	Event	Notes
Representing Iran
2010	Asian Para Games	Guangzhou, China	1st	Discus throw	
2014	Asian Para Games	Incheon, South Korea	2nd	Shot put	
2016	Summer Paralympics	Rio de Janeiro, Brazil	3rd	Shot put	14.13 m
2017	Islamic Solidarity Games	Baku, Azerbaijan	2nd	Shot put	13.74 m
2018	Asian Para Games	Jakarta, Indonesia	2nd	Discus throw	44.10 m
