= Garrah Tnaiash =

Iraqi Paralympic athlete (born 1991)

Personal information
- Born: 1 January 1991 (age 35)

Sport
- Country: Iraq
- Sport: Para-athletics
- Disability: Short stature
- Disability class: F40
- Event: Shot put
Medal record
Men's para-athletics
Representing Iraq
Event	1st	2nd	3rd
Paralympic Games	1	1	1
World Championships	2	2	2
Asian Para Games	2	0	0
Total	5	3	3
Paralympic Games
Gold medal – first place	2016 Rio de Janeiro	Shot put F40
Silver medal – second place	2020 Tokyo	Shot put F40
Bronze medal – third place	2024 Paris	Shot put F40
World Championships
Gold medal – first place	2015 Doha	Shot put F40
Gold medal – first place	2017 London	Shot put F40
Silver medal – second place	2019 Dubai	Shot put F40
Silver medal – second place	2023 Paris	Shot put F40
Bronze medal – third place	2024 Kobe	Shot put F40
Bronze medal – third place	2025 New Delhi	Shot put F40
Asian Para Games
Gold medal – first place	2018 Jakarta	Shot put F40
Gold medal – first place	2022 Hangzhou	Shot put F40

Garrah Nassar Tnaiash (born 1 January 1991) is an Iraqi Paralympic athlete of short stature. He represented Iraq at the 2016 Summer Paralympics held in Rio de Janeiro, Brazil and he won the gold medal in the men's shot put F40. In 2021, he won the silver medal in the same event at the 2020 Summer Paralympics held in Tokyo, Japan.

== Career ==
At the 2015 World Championships held in Doha, Qatar, he won the gold medal in the men's shot put F40 event. Two years later, he also won the gold medal in the same event at the 2017 World Championships held in London, United Kingdom.

At the 2018 Asian Para Games held in Jakarta, Indonesia, he set a new world record of 10.88m in the shot put F40 event.

At the 2019 World Championships held in Dubai, United Arab Emirates, he won the silver medal in the shot put F40 event. At this event Denis Gnezdilov of Russia threw a distance of 10.88m, the same as Tnaiash's world record.

== Achievements ==
Year	Competition	Venue	Position	Event	Notes
Representing Iraq
2015	World Championships	Doha, Qatar	1st	Shot put	10.66 m
2016	Summer Paralympics	Rio de Janeiro, Brazil	1st	Shot put	10.76 m
2017	World Championships	London, United Kingdom	1st	Shot put	10.49 m
2018	Asian Para Games	Jakarta, Indonesia	1st	Shot put	10.88 m
2019	World Championships	Dubai, United Arab Emirates	2nd	Shot put	10.77 m
2021	Summer Paralympics	Tokyo, Japan	2nd	Shot put	11.15 m
