= Saman Pakbaz =

Iranian Paralympic athlete (born 1995)

Personal information
- Born: 19 July 1995 (age 31)

Sport
- Sport: Paralympic athletics
Medal record
Paralympic athletics
Representing Iran
Paralympic Games
Silver medal – second place	2016 Rio de Janeiro	Shot put F11-12
World Championships
Gold medal – first place	2015 Doha	Discus throw F12
Gold medal – first place	2017 London	Shot put F12
Silver medal – second place	2015 Doha	Shot put F12
Silver medal – second place	2017 London	Discus throw F12
Bronze medal – third place	2024 Kobe	Shot put F12
Asian Para Games
Gold medal – first place	2022 Hangzhou	Shot put F12
Gold medal – first place	2026 Aichi–Nagoya	Shot put F12
Silver medal – second place	2018 Jakarta	Shot put F12

Saman Pakbaz (Persian: سامان پاکباز, born 19 July 1995) is a paralympic athlete from Iran competing in category F11-12 shot put event.

== Career ==
In 2015 he earned his place in the 2016 Summer Paralympics in Rio de Janeiro at the 2015 International Paralympic Committee (IPC) Athletics World Championships in Qatar, earning a silver medal for Iran with a throw of 15.19 meters (16.61 yd).

Pakbaz competed in the 2016 Summer Paralympics shot put and won the silver medal in the F11-12 shot put.
