= Hernán Emanuel Urra =

Argentine Paralympic athlete (born 1996)

Hernán Urra
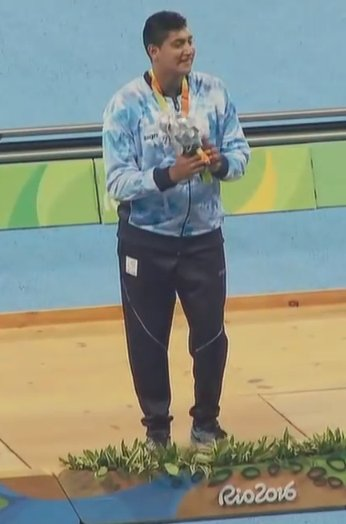
- Hernán Urra at Rio 2016 Paralympics

Personal information
- Full name: Hernán Emanuel Urra
- Born: 31 October 1996 (age 29) Cinco Saltos, Argentina

Sport
- Country: Argentina
- Sport: Para-athletics
- Disability: Cerebral palsy
- Disability class: F35
- Event: Shot put
Medal record
Men's para-athletics
Representing Argentina
Paralympic Games
Silver medal – second place	2016 Rio de Janeiro	Shot put F35
Silver medal – second place	2020 Tokyo	Shot put F35
Silver medal – second place	2024 Paris	Shot put F35
World Championships
Silver medal – second place	2023 Paris	Shot put F35
Silver medal – second place	2025 New Delhi	Shot put F35
Bronze medal – third place	2019 Dubai	Shot put F35
Parapan American Games
Gold medal – first place	2019 Lima	Shot put F35/36/37
Silver medal – second place	2023 Santiago	Shot put F35/36/37

Hernán Emanuel Urra (born 31 October 1996) is an Argentine Paralympic athlete with cerebral palsy competing in F35-classification shot put events. He is a three-time silver medalist at the Summer Paralympics.

== Career ==
He represented Argentina at the 2016 Summer Paralympics held in Rio de Janeiro, Brazil and he won the silver medal in the men's shot put F35 event. He also won the silver medal in the men's shot put F35 event at the 2020 Summer Paralympics held in Tokyo, Japan.

In 2019, he qualified to represent Argentina at the 2020 Summer Paralympics in Tokyo, Japan after winning the bronze medal in the men's shot put F35 event at the 2019 World Para Athletics Championships held in Dubai, United Arab Emirates.

He won the silver medal in his event at the 2023 Parapan American Games held in Santiago, Chile.

== Achievements ==
Year	Competition	Venue	Position	Event	Notes
Representing Argentina
2016	Summer Paralympics	Rio de Janeiro, Brazil	2nd	Shot put	14.91 m
2019	World Championships	Dubai, United Arab Emirates	3rd	Shot put	15.87 m
2019	Parapan American Games	Lima, Peru	1st	Shot put	
2021	Summer Paralympics	Tokyo, Japan	2nd	Shot put	15.90 m
2023	World Championships	Paris, France	2nd	Shot put	15.55 m
2023	Parapan American Games	Santiago, Chile	2nd	Shot put	
2024	Summer Paralympics	Paris, France	2nd	Shot put	
