= Daniel Scheil =

German Paralympic athlete

Personal information
- Born: 13 January 1973 (age 53)

Sport
- Country: Germany
- Sport: Para-athletics
- Disability: Quadriplegia
- Disability class: F33
- Events: Discus throw; Javelin throw; Shot put
Medal record
Paralympic Games
Gold medal – first place	2016 Rio de Janeiro	Shot put F33
World Championships
Bronze medal – third place	2015 Doha	Shot put F33
Silver medal – second place	2017 London	Shot put F33
European Championships
Gold medal – first place	2014 Swansea	Javelin throw F34
Gold medal – first place	2014 Swansea	Discus throw F34
Silver medal – second place	2016 Grosseto	Shot put F33
Silver medal – second place	2016 Grosseto	Discus throw F34

Daniel Scheil (born 13 January 1973) is a German Paralympic athlete competing in F33-classification discus throw and shot put events. He represented Germany at the 2016 Summer Paralympics held in Rio de Janeiro, Brazil and he won the gold medal in the men's shot put F33 event.

At the 2014 European Championships held in Swansea, United Kingdom, he won the gold medals in the men's discus throw F34 and in the men's javelin throw F34 events. Two years later he won two silver medals: both in the men's shot put F33 event and in the men's discus throw F34 event.

At the World Championships he won the bronze medal in 2015 in the men's shot put F33 event and in 2017 he won the silver medal in the men's shot put F33 event.
