= Smaali Bouaabid =

Tunisian Paralympic athlete

Sport
- Country: Tunisia
- Sport: Para-athletics
- Disability: Short stature
- Disability class: F40
- Event: Shot put
Medal record
Paralympic Games
Bronze medal – third place	2016 Rio de Janeiro	Shot put F40

Smaali Bouaabid is a Tunisian Paralympic athlete of short stature. He represented Tunisia at the 2016 Summer Paralympics in Rio de Janeiro, Brazil and he won the bronze medal in the men's shot put F40 event.

== Achievements ==
Year	Competition	Venue	Position	Event	Notes
Representing Tunisia
2016	Summer Paralympics	Rio de Janeiro, Brazil	3rd	Shot put	9.44 m
