= Tyrone Pillay =

South African Paralympic athlete

Personal information
- Born: May 1, 1980 (age 46)

Sport
- Country: South Africa
- Sport: Para-athletics
- Disability: Left leg amputation
- Event: Shot put
Medal record
Men's para-athletics
Representing South Africa
Paralympic Games
Bronze medal – third place	2016 Rio de Janeiro	Shot put F42
African Games
Gold medal – first place	2015 Brazzaville	Shot put F42

Tyrone Pillay (born 1 May 1980) is a South African Paralympic athlete. He represented South Africa at the 2016 Summer Paralympics in Rio de Janeiro, Brazil and he won the bronze medal in the men's shot put F42 event.

== Career ==
At the 2015 African Games held in Brazzaville, Republic of the Congo, he won the gold medal in the men's shot put F42 event.

At the 2019 World Para Athletics Championships held in Dubai, United Arab Emirates, he competed in the men's shot put F63 event where he finished in 7th place.

He competed in the men's shot put F63 event at the 2020 Summer Paralympics held in Tokyo, Japan. He also competed in this event at the 2023 World Para Athletics Championships held in Paris, France.

== Achievements ==
Year	Competition	Venue	Position	Event	Notes
Representing South Africa
2015	African Games	Brazzaville, Republic of the Congo	1st	Shot put	11.28 m
2016	Summer Paralympics	Rio de Janeiro, Brazil	3rd	Shot put	13.91 m
