= Ruzhdi Ruzhdi =

Bulgarian Paralympic athlete (born 1991)

Personal information
- Native name: Ружди Ружди
- Born: 14 April 1991 (age 35) Glodzhevo, Bulgaria

Sport
- Country: Bulgaria
- Sport: Athletics
- Disability class: F55
- Events: javelin; shot put; discus

Achievements and titles
- Paralympic finals: 2012 London; 2016 Rio de Janeiro; 2020 Tokyo; 2024 Paris
Medal record
Men's athletics
Representing Bulgaria
Paralympic Games
Gold medal – first place	2016 Rio de Janeiro	Shot put F55
Gold medal – first place	2024 Paris	Shot put F55
Silver medal – second place	2020 Tokyo	Shot put F55
World Championships
Gold medal – first place	2015 Doha	Shot put F55
Gold medal – first place	2017 London	Shot put F55
Gold medal – first place	2019 Dubai	Shot put F55
Gold medal – first place	2023 Paris	Shot put F55
Gold medal – first place	2024 Kobe	Shot put F55
Gold medal – first place	2025 New Delhi	Shot put F55
European Championships
Gold medal – first place	2014 Swansea	Shot put F53/54/55
Gold medal – first place	2016 Grosseto	Shot put F55
Gold medal – first place	2016 Grosseto	Discus F56

Ruzhdi Ruzhdi (Bulgarian: Ружди Ружди; born 14 April 1991) is a Bulgarian Paralympian track and field athlete, competing in throwing events: javelin throw, shot put, and discus throw. He is a two-time Olympic Champion and six-time World Champion, and world record holder in Shot Put F55.

== Personal history ==
Ruzhdi was born on 14 April 1991 in the small northeastern town of Glodzhevo, Bulgaria. When he was 17, he survived a car crash, but was left paralysed from the waist down.

== Athletics career ==
During balneotherapy rehabilitation in Pavel Banya, he met Daniela Todorova and her brother and trainer Radoslav Todorov, who recognised his sports talent.

Ruzhdi first represented Bulgaria on the world stage in London during the 2012 Summer Paralympics. He entered the shot put, javelin and discus throw, but did not medal in any of his events. The following year he travelled to Lyon to compete at the 2015 IPC Athletics World Championships. He entered the same three throwing events as in Beijing and again failed to reach the podium. Ruzhdi first major international success came at the 2014 IPC Athletics European Championships where he won the shot put in the F53/54/55 category with a throw of 11.48 metres.

In October 2015, Ruzhdi won the golden medal in shot put, category F55, at the 2015 IPC Athletics World Championships. His result was 11.81 metres (38.7 ft), which was a new championship record.

In June 2016, at the IPC Athletics European Championships in Grosseto, Italy, Ruzhdi won golden medal in the discus throwing discipline, category F56, with the result of 39.33 metres (129.0 ft), which was 9 centimetres (3.5 in) short of the world record that belonged to another Bulgarian Paralympic athlete Mustafa Yuseinov, who won the bronze in the same event with result of 37.24 metres (122.2 ft). At the same championship, Ruzhdi won his third European golden medal with his result in shot put, 12.04 metres (39.5 ft), which improved the previous world record held by Martin Němec (11.85 metres (38.9 ft)).

At the Paralympic games in Rio in 2016, Ruzhdi won the golden medal in shot put, category F55, improving his world record from Grosseto to 12.33 metres (40.5 ft). Ruzhdi achieved this result with his first throw, and in three other attempts his results were better than the previous world record, namely: 12.22 metres (40.1 ft), 12.19 metres (40.0 ft), and 12.12 metres (39.8 ft). In the discus throwing event, Ruzhdi ranked sixth with best result of 38.04 metres (124.8 ft).
