= Li Cuiqing =

Chinese Paralympic athlete

Personal information
- Born: 9 March 1997 (age 29)

Sport
- Country: China
- Sport: Para-athletics
- Disability: Cerebral palsy
- Event: Shot put
Medal record
Men's para-athletics
Representing China
Paralympic Games
Bronze medal – third place	2016 Rio de Janeiro	Shot put F36
World Championships
Silver medal – second place	2017 London	Shot put F36
Bronze medal – third place	2015 Doha	Shot put F36
Asian Para Games
Gold medal – first place	2018 Jakarta	Shot put F37
Silver medal – second place	2018 Jakarta	Discus throw F37

Li Cuiqing (born 9 March 1997) is a Chinese Paralympic athlete with cerebral palsy. He represented China at the 2016 Summer Paralympics in Rio de Janeiro, Brazil and he won the bronze medal in the men's shot put F36 event.

At the 2015 World Championships in Doha, Qatar, he won the bronze medal in the men's shot put F36 event. In 2017, at the World Championships in London, United Kingdom, he won the silver medal in the men's shot put F36 event.

== Achievements ==
Year	Competition	Venue	Position	Event	Notes
Representing China
2015	World Championships	Doha, Qatar	3rd	Shot put	14.52 m
2016	Summer Paralympics	Rio de Janeiro, Brazil	3rd	Shot put	14.02 m
2017	World Championships	London, United Kingdom	2nd	Shot put	14.93 m
