= Alireza Mokhtari =

Iranian Paralympic athlete (born 1977)

Personal information
- Full name: Alireza Mokhtari Hemami
- Nationality: Iranian
- Born: 24 October 1977 (age 48) Esfahan

Sport
- Sport: Paralympic athletics
Medal record
Men's para-athletics
Representing Iran
Paralympic Games
Silver medal – second place	2020 Tokyo	Shot put F53
Bronze medal – third place	2024 Paris	Shot put F53
World Championships
Gold medal – first place	2017 London	Shot put F53
Bronze medal – third place	2019 Dubai	Shot put F53
Bronze medal – third place	2024 Kobe	Shot put F53
Asian Para Games
Gold medal – first place	2014 Incheon	Discus throw F51/52/53
Gold medal – first place	2018 Jakarta	Shot put F53
Gold medal – first place	2022 Hangzhou	Discus throw F51/52/53
Silver medal – second place	2022 Hangzhou	Shot put F53
Bronze medal – third place	2018 Jakarta	Discus throw F51/52/53

Alireza Mokhtari Hemami (Persian: علیرضا مختاری همامی, born 24 October 1977) is an Iranian Paralympic athlete.

== Career ==
He represented Iran at the 2020 Summer Paralympics in Tokyo, Japan and won the silver medal in the Men's shot put F53 event.

At the 2024 Summer Paralympics, he claimed Silver with a throw of 8.69m in the Shot put F53.
