= Sajad Mohammadian =

Iranian Paralympic athlete (born 1983)

Personal information
- Born: 15 November 1983 (age 42)

Sport
- Country: Iran
- Sport: Para-athletics
- Disability class: F42
- Event: Shot put
Medal record
Men's para-athletics
Representing Iran
Paralympic Games
Silver medal – second place	2016 Rio de Janeiro	Shot put F42
Silver medal – second place	2020 Tokyo	Shot put F63
World Championships
Silver medal – second place	2017 London	Shot put F42
Silver medal – second place	2023 Paris	Shot put F63
Bronze medal – third place	2019 Dubai	Shot put F63
Asian Para Games
Gold medal – first place	2018 Jakarta	Shot put F42/61/63

Sajad Mohammadian (born 15 November 1983) is an Iranian Paralympic athlete. He is a two-time silver medalist at the Summer Paralympics.

== Career ==
He represented Iran at the 2016 Summer Paralympics held in Rio de Janeiro, Brazil and he won the silver medal in the men's shot put F42 event. At the 2020 Summer Paralympics in Tokyo, Japan, he won the silver medal in the men's shot put F63 event.

At the 2017 World Championships he won the silver medal in the men's shot put F42 event and at the 2019 World Championships he won the bronze medal in the men's shot put F63 event. He also won the silver medal in this event at the 2023 World Para Athletics Championships held in Paris, France.
