= Dimitrios Senikidis =

Greek Paralympic athlete

Sport
- Country: Greece
- Sport: Para-athletics
- Disability: Intellectual disability
- Disability class: F20
- Event: Shot put
Medal record
Men's para-athletics
Representing Greece
Paralympic Games
Silver medal – second place	2016 Rio de Janeiro	Shot put F20
World Championships
Silver medal – second place	2015 Doha	Shot put F20
European Championships
Gold medal – first place	2016 Grosseto	Shot put F20

Dimitrios Senikidis is a Greek Paralympic athlete with an intellectual disability competing in shot put events. He represented Greece at the 2016 Summer Paralympics held in Rio de Janeiro, Brazil and he won the silver medal in the men's shot put F20 event.

== Career ==
He represented Greece at the 2010 Summer Youth Olympics held in Singapore. He competed in the boys' shot put event. At the 2015 IPC Athletics World Championships held in Doha, Qatar, he won the silver medal in the men's shot put F20 event. The following year, he won the gold medal in the men's shot put F20 event at the 2016 IPC Athletics European Championships held in Grosseto, Italy.

== Achievements ==
Year	Competition	Venue	Position	Event	Notes
Representing Greece
2015	World Championships	Doha, Qatar	2nd	Shot put	15.45
2016	European Championships	Grosseto, Italy	1st	Shot put	15.46
2016	Summer Paralympics	Rio de Janeiro, Brazil	2nd	Shot put	16.17
