= Asadollah Azimi =

Iranian Paralympic athlete

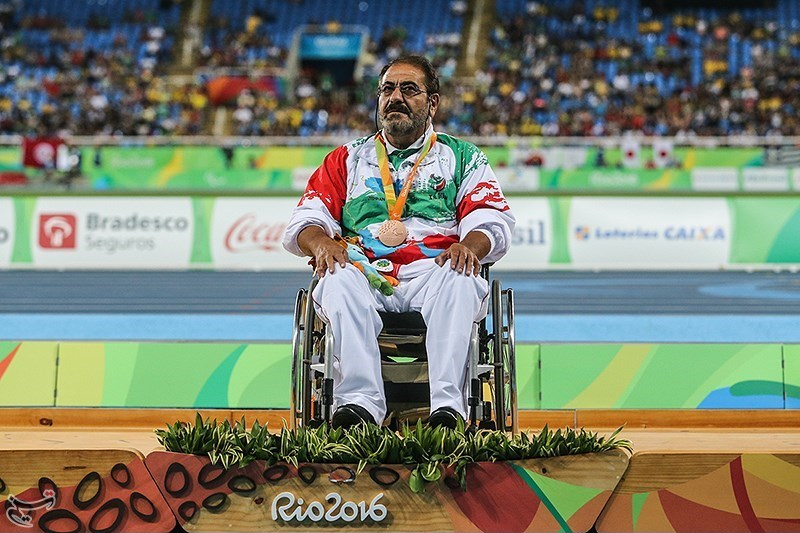

Personal information
- Born: 25 September 1959 (age 67) Mianeh, East Azerbaijan
Medal record
Men's para-athletics
Representing Iran
Paralympic Games
Bronze medal – third place	2016 Rio de Janeiro	Shot Put - F53
IPC World Championships
Bronze medal – third place	2017 London	Shot put– F53
Asian Para Games
Silver medal – second place	2018 Jakarta	Shot put F53
Silver medal – second place	2018 Jakarta	Discus throw F51/52/53
Silver medal – second place	2022 Hangzhou	Discus throw F51/52/53

Asadollah Azimi (born 25 September 1959 in Mianeh, East Azerbaijan) is a Paralympian athlete from Iran competing mainly in category F53 throwing events.
