= Scot Severn =

American Paralympic athlete (born 1968)

Personal information
- Born: July 20, 1968 (age 57) Unionville, Michigan, USA
- Height: 188 cm (74 in)

Sport
- Country: United States
- Sport: Athletics
- Disability class: F53
- Event(s): Javelin throw, Discus throw, Shot put
Medal record
Track and field
Representing United States
Paralympic Games
Silver medal – second place	2016 Rio de Janeiro	Shot put F53
Bronze medal – third place	2012 London	Shot put F53
IPC World Championships
Silver medal – second place	2013 Lyon	Shot put F53
Silver medal – second place	2015 Doha	Shot put F53
Parapan American Games
Silver medal – second place	2011 Guadalajara	Shot put F52/53
Silver medal – second place	2011 Guadalajara	Discus throw F51/52/53

Scot Severn (born July 20, 1968) is a Paralympian athlete from the United States competing mainly in F53 classification throwing events.

== Athletics history ==
Severn first represented the United States at the 2008 Summer Paralympics in Beijing, entering the shot put and discus throw events. Four years later he experienced Paralympic success at the 2012 Games in London, where he threw a distance of 8.26 to claim the bronze medal in the shot put.

As well as his Paralympic appearances, Severn has also been part of three U.S. teams to compete at the IPC Athletics World Championships, beginning in Christchurch, New Zealand at the 2011 IPC Athletics World Championships. Severn has won two World title medals, both in the shot put and both silver, in Lyon in 2013 and Doha in 2015.

== Personal history ==
Severn was born in Cass City, Michigan in the United States in 1968. Whilst serving as a United States Army Reserve he was struck by lightning and thrown over thirty meters. The resulting trauma left him with quadriplegia. Severn is married to his wife Brenda and has three children named Nicole, Kyle, and Colton.
