= Todd Hodgetts =

Australian Paralympic athlete

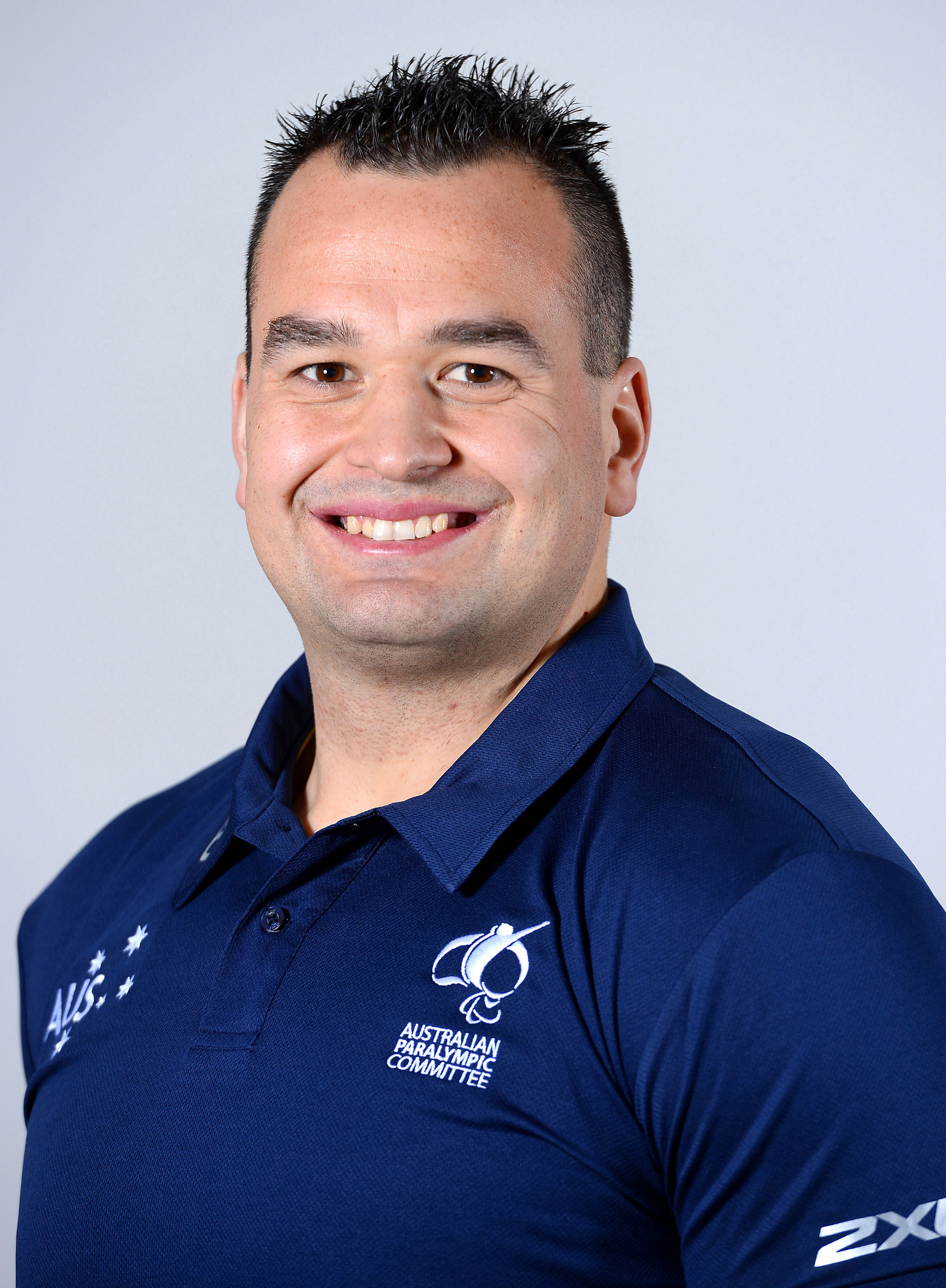
- 2016 Australian Paralympic team portrait of Hodgetts

Personal information
- Full name: Todd Hodgetts
- Nickname: The Hulk
- Nationality: Australian
- Born: 23 March 1988 (age 38) Launceston, Tasmania, Australia

Sport
- Country: Australia
- Sport: Athletics
- Event: Shot Put
- Club: Scott Martin
Medal record
Track and field
Paralympic Games
Gold medal – first place	2012 London	Men's Shot Put F20
Bronze medal – third place	2016 Rio	Men's Shot Put F20
IPC Athletics World Championships
Gold medal – first place	2015 Doha	Men's Shot Put F20
Bronze medal – third place	2013 Lyon	Men's Shot Put F20
Bronze medal – third place	2017 London	Shot put F20

Todd Hodgetts, OAM (born 23 March 1988) is an Australian athlete on the autism spectrum who won a gold medal at the 2012 London Paralympics and a bronze medal at the 2016 Rio Paralympics, and also competed at the 2020 Summer Paralympics.

== Personal ==
Todd Hodgetts was born on 23 March 1988 in Launceston, Tasmania, and grew up in the suburb of Newstead. He lived in Tasmania until 2011, when he moved to Canberra to improve his chances of making the 2012 Summer Paralympics. After the London Games, he relocated to Melbourne. He is studying for a certificate IV in fitness as of 2012.

He has an autism spectrum disorder. Other sports in which he participates include weightlifting.

== Athletics ==
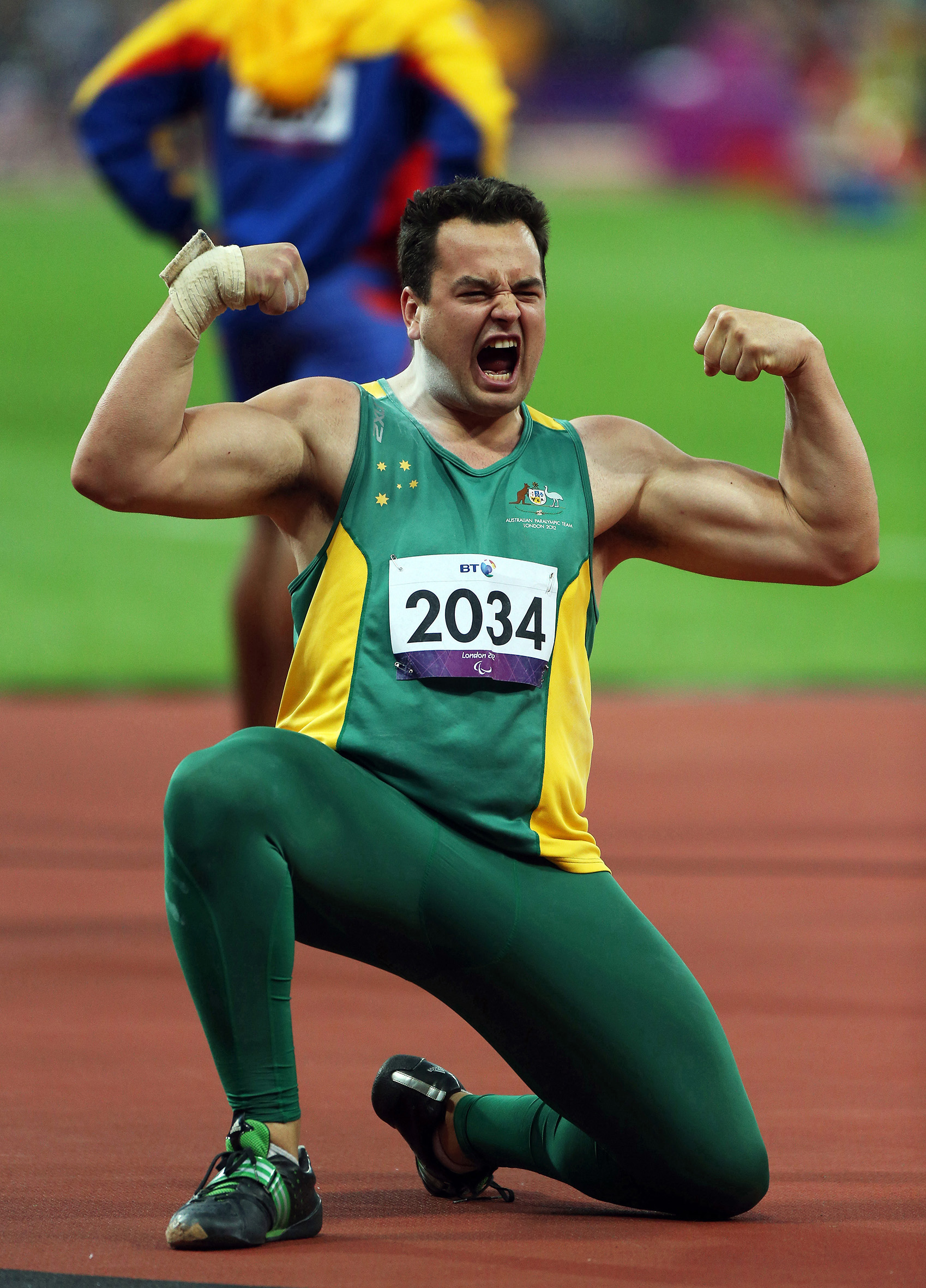
Hodgetts at the 2012 London Paralympics

Nicknamed "The Hulk", Hodgetts specialises in the shot put. He competes in the F20 classification. He is coached by Gus Puopolo. He works with a gymnastics coach to help with his balance and conditioning. He is a member of the Newstead Athletics Club.

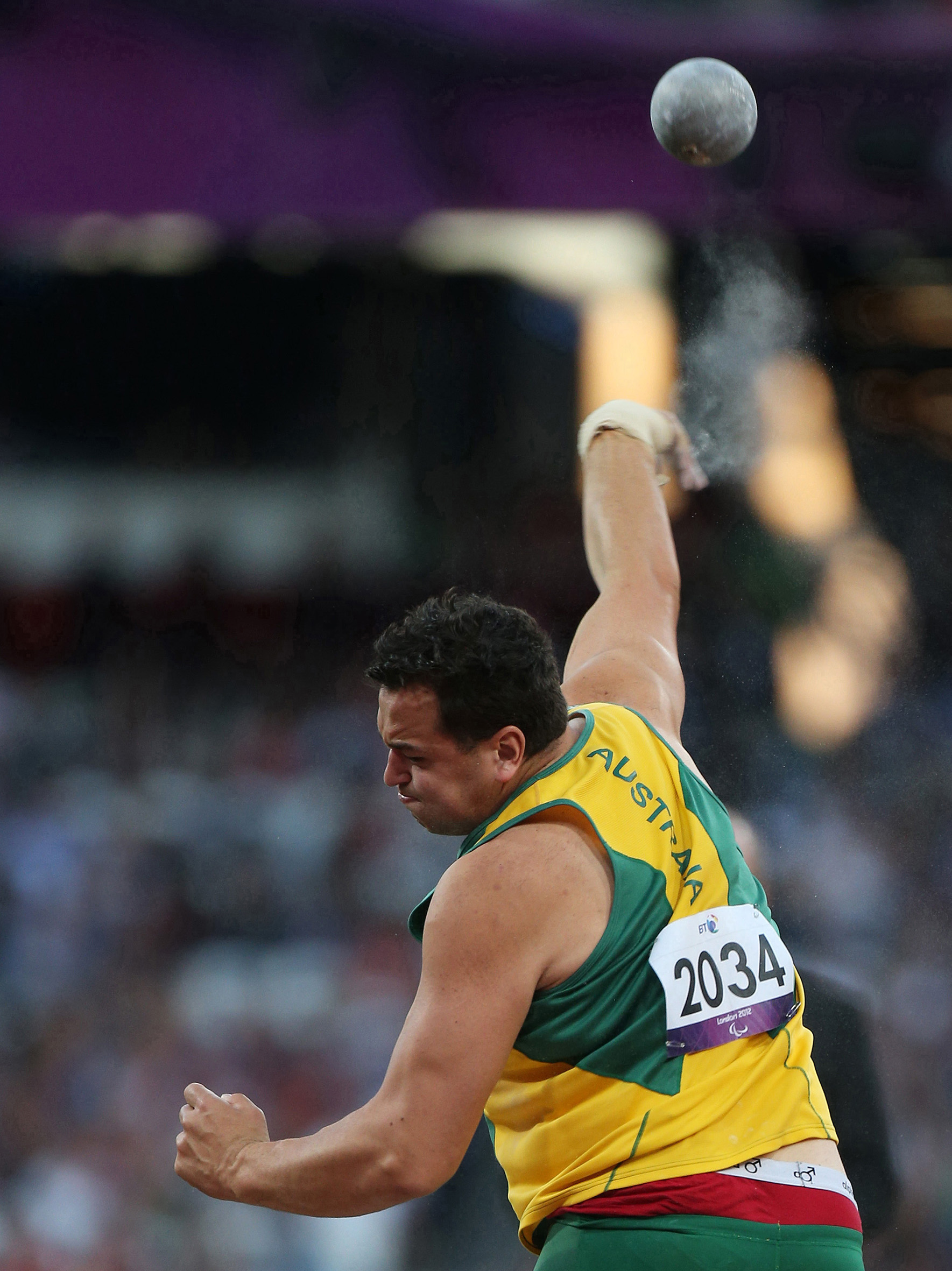
Hodgetts at the 2012 London Paralympics

Hodgetts started competing in athletics in shot put in 1998 after his brother brought home a shot put from high school and encouraged him to try it as kind of a joke. At the 2004 Tasmanian Athletics Championships, he competed in the under-18 shot put event where he scored a state record with one of his throws.

Hodgetts made his national team debut in 2005. In 2008, he was the Australian champion in the shot put. He competed at the 2009 Australian national athletics championships in Adelaide. In 2009, at an Athletics South flagship interclub competition, he won the shot put with a distance of 15.43 m. At the 2012 Tasmanian Track and Field Championships, he had a season's best throw of 16.04 m to win the event. At the 2012 Australian Athletics Championships, he set a world record in the shot put. At the 2012 London Paralympics, he won a gold medal in the Men's Shot Put F20 event. After the Games, he underwent elbow surgery.

In 2013, Hodgetts relocated to Melbourne to train under throws coach Gus Puoplo. Competing at the 2013 IPC Athletics World Championships in Lyon, France, he won a bronze medal in the Men's Shot Put F20. He was awarded an Order of Australia Medal in the 2014 Australia Day Honours "for service to sport as a Gold Medallist at the London 2012 Paralympic Games."

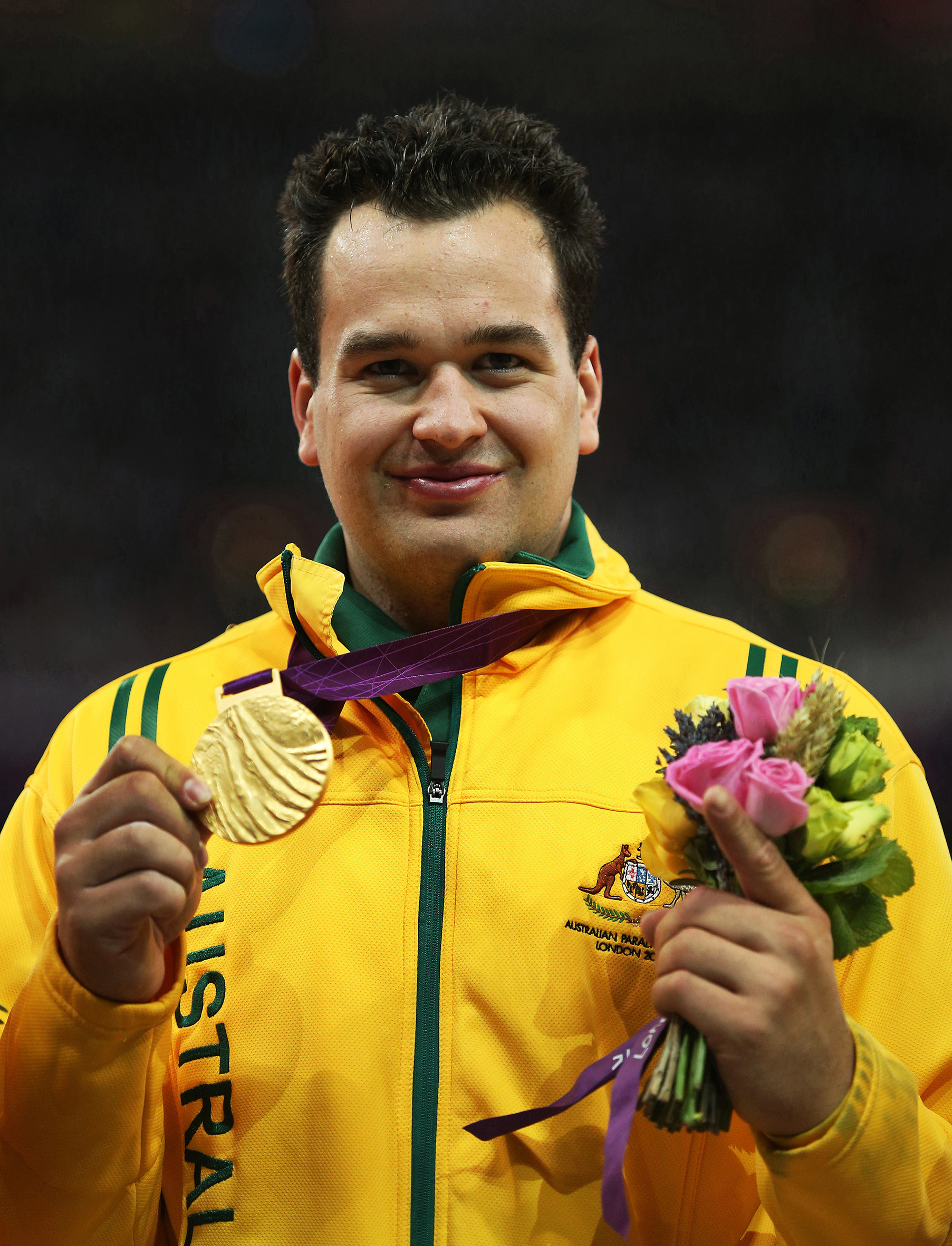
Gold medallist Hodgetts at the 2012 London Paralympics

At the 2015 IPC Athletics World Championships in Doha, Hodgetts won the gold men in the Men's Shot Put F20 with a championship record of 15.83 m. After winning the gold medal, Hodgetts said: "People wrote me off after London. I had two surgeries and people were saying that I couldn’t come back, it’s amazing that I have. The faith that my coach, and Athletics Australia, and the team at the VIS had in me made me confident that I could and it’s awesome."

At the 2015 Australian University Games, he would claim Gold in the Men's Shot Put, with a throw of 15.64m, competing for Victoria University.

On 13 February 2016 at the Briggs Athletics Classic in Hobart, Tasmania, he threw the shot put 16.33 m to break the world record of 16.24 m for the Men's F20 that he set at the 2012 Paralympic Games.

At the 2016 Rio Paralympics, he won a bronze medal in the Men's Shot Put F20 with a throw of 15.82 m.

Hodgetts won bronze medal in the Men's Shot Put F20 with a throw of 15.96 m at the 2017 World Para Athletics Championships in London, England. At the 2019 World Para Athletics Championships in Dubai, he finished ninth in the Men's Shot Put F20. England

At the 2020 Tokyo Paralympics, technical officials flagged that Hodgetts and Ecuador's Jordi Congo-Villalba and Malaysian Muhammad Ziyad Zolkefli were late to the pre-event call-room. They were allowed to compete, but were marked as DNS (Did Not Start). His passionate interview after the event had some in the press calling him an "instant legend", and Australian Prime Minister Scott Morrison called the interview "inspiring".

== Recognition ==
- 2015 – Athletics Australia Male Para-athlete of the Year.
- 2015 – Tasmanian Athlete of the Year finalist.
- 2016 - Victorian Institute of Sport William Angliss Personal Excellence Award
