= Xia Zhiwei =

Chinese paralympic athlete

Zhiwei Xia
Sport
- Country: China
- Sport: Para-athletics
Medal record
Representing China
Paralympic Games
Para-athletics
Bronze medal – third place	2016 Rio de Janeiro	Men's shot put F41

Zhiwei Xia is a Chinese paralympic athlete. He competed at the 2016 Summer Paralympics in the athletics competition, winning the bronze medal in the men's shot put event on F41 class.
