= Dimitrios Zisidis =

Greek Paralympic athlete

Personal information
- Born: 26 March 1975 (age 51) Thessaloniki, Greece

Sport
- Country: Greece
- Sport: Paralympic athletics
- Disability: Cerebral palsy
- Disability class: F32
Medal record
Paralympic athletics
Representing Greece
Paralympic Games
Bronze medal – third place	2016 Rio de Janeiro	Shot put F32
World Championships
Bronze medal – third place	2015 Doha	Shot put F32
Bronze medal – third place	2024 Kobe	Shot put F32

Dimitrios Zisidis (born 26 March 1975) is a Greek para-track and field athlete.

== Career ==
He competed at the 2016 Summer Paralympics in the F32 shot put and club throw. He won a bronze medal in the shot put with a personal best distance of 9.24 metres.

== See also ==
- Greece at the 2016 Summer Paralympics
