= F55 (classification) =

Paralympic athletics classification

F55 is a disability sport classification for disability athletics for people who compete in field events from a seated position. Sportspeople in this class have full arm function, partial trunk function and no lower limb function. Different disability groups compete in this class, including people with spinal cord injuries. The classification was previously known as lower 3, upper 4.

== Sport ==
International Paralympic Committee defined this classification on their website in July 2016, "Athletes have full function of the arms and partial to full trunk muscle power. There is no movement in the lower limbs. Athletes with bilateral hip disarticulations are appropriately placed in this class." The Spectator Guide for the Rio Paralympics defines the class as, "wheelchair athletes (effects of polio, spinal cord injuries and amputations)" People competing in the seated position in this class generally have good balance, good trunk rotations and can move their upper body backwards and forwards.

== Disability groups ==
=== Amputees ===
People who are amputees compete in this class, including ISOD A9. In general, track athletes with amputations in should be considerate of the surface they are running on, and avoid asphalt and cinder tracks.

==== Upper and lower limb amputees ====
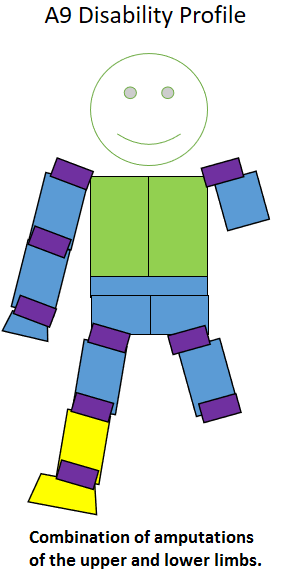
Type of amputation for an A9 classified sportsperson.

Members of the ISOD A9 class compete in T42, T43, T44, F42, F43, F44, F56, F57, and F58. The shank length of people in this class can differ dramatically, and is not uniform across the class. A study of was done comparing the performance of athletics competitors at the 1984 Summer Paralympics. It found there was no significant difference in performance in times between men in the A3, A4, A5, A6, A7, A8 and A9 in the discus, men in A1, A2, A3, A4, A5, A6, A7, A8 and A9 in the javelin, and men in A8 and A9 in the shot put.

The nature of an A9 athlete's amputations can effect their physiology and sports performance. Because of the potential for balance issues related to having an amputation, during weight training, amputees are encouraged to use a spotter when lifting more than 15 pounds (6.8 kg). Lower limb amputations effect a person's energy cost for being mobile. To keep their oxygen consumption rate similar to people without lower limb amputations, they need to walk slower. Because they are missing a limb, amputees are more prone to overuse injuries in their remaining limbs. Common problems with intact upper limbs for people in this class include rotator cuffs tearing, shoulder impingement, epicondylitis and peripheral nerve entrapment.

=== Les Autres ===
People who are Les Autres compete in this class. This includes LAF3 classified athletes. In general, Les Autres classes cover sportspeople with locomotor disabilities regardless of their diagnosis.

==== LAF3 ====
In athletics, LAF3 competitors compete in F54, F55, F56, F57 and F58 events. These are wheelchair athletics classes. Athletes in this class have normal functioning in their throwing arm. While throwing, they can generally maintain good balance. Competitors in this class may also compete in T44. This is a standing class for people with weakness in one leg muscle or who have joint restrictions. At the 1984 Summer Paralympics, LAF1, LAF2 and LAF3 track athletes had the 60 meters and 400 meter distances on the program. There was a large range of sportspeople with different disabilities in this class at the 1984 Summer Paralympics.

LAF3 is an Les Autres sports classification. Sportspeople in this class use wheelchairs on a regular basis as a result of reduced muscle function. They have normal trunk functionality, balance and use of their upper limbs. Medically, this class includes people with hemiparesis, and hip and knee stiffness with deformation in one arm. It means they have limited function in at least two limbs. In terms of functional classification, this means the sportsperson uses a wheelchair, has good sitting balance and has good arm function. For the 1984 Summer Paralympics, LAF3 was defined by the Games organizers as, "Wheelchair bound with normal arm function and good sitting balance."

=== Spinal cord injuries ===
People with spinal cord injuries compete in this class, including F5 sportspeople.

==== F5 ====
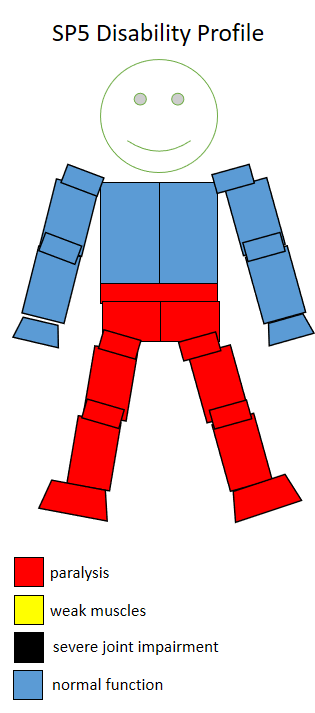
Functional profile of a wheelchair sportsperson in the F5 class.

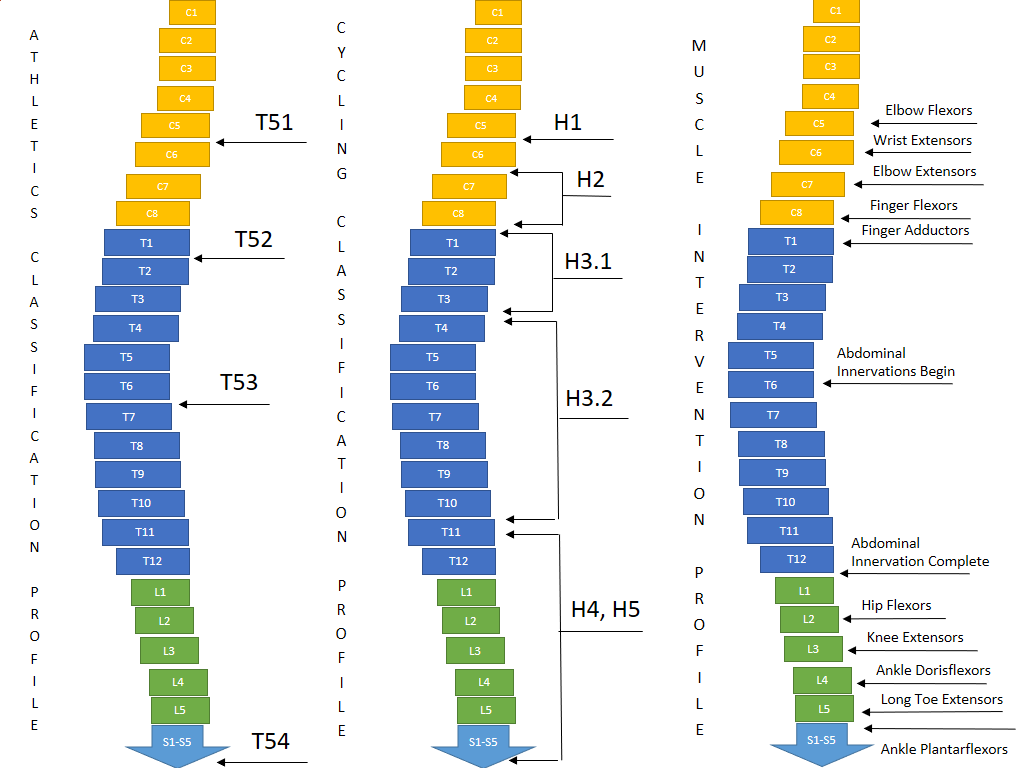
Comparing key muscle innervations for spinal cord levels compared to cycling and athletics classifications.

This is wheelchair sport classification that corresponds to the neurological level T8 - L1. In the past, this class was known as Lower 3, or Upper 4. Disabled Sports USA defined the anatomical definition of this class in 2003 as, "Normal upper limb function. Have abdominal muscles and spinal extensors (upper or more commonly upper and lower). May have non-functional hip flexors (grade 1). Have no abductor function."

People in this class have good sitting balance. People with lesions located between T9 and T12 have some loss of abdominal muscle control. Disabled Sports USA defined the functional definition of this class in 2003 as, "Three trunk movements may be seen in this class: 1) Off the back of a chair (in an upwards direction). 2) Movement in the backwards and forwards plane. 3) Some trunk rotation. They have fair to good sitting balance. They cannot have functional hip flexors, i.e. ability to lift the thigh upwards in the sitting position. They may have stiffness of the spine that improves balance but reduces the ability to rotate the spine."

Field events open to this class have included shot put, discus and javelin. In pentathlon, the events for this class have included Shot, Javelin, 200m, Discus, 1500m. F5 athletes throw from a seated position, and use a javelin that weighs .6 kilograms (1.3 lb). The shot put used by women in this class weighs less than the traditional one at 3 kilograms (6.6 lb). Athletes in this class who good trunk control and mobility have an advantage over athletes in the same class who have less functional trunk control and mobility. This functional difference can cause different performance results within the same class, with discus throwers with more control in a class able to throw the discus further.

There are performance differences and similarities between this class and other wheelchair classes. A study of javelin throwers in 2003 found that F5 throwers have angular speeds of the shoulder girdle similar to that of F3 to F9 throwers. A 1999 study of discus throwers found that for F5 to F8 discus throwers, the upper arm tends to be near horizontal at the moment of release of the discus. F5 to F7 discus throwers have greater angular speed of the shoulder girdle during release of the discus than the lower number classes of F2 to F4. F5 and F8 discus throwers have less average angular forearm speed than F2 and F4 throwers. F2 and F4 speed is caused by use of the elbow flexion to compensate for the shoulder flexion advantage of F5 to F8 throwers.

A study of was done comparing the performance of athletics competitors at the 1984 Summer Paralympics. It found there was little significant difference in performance in distance between women in 1C (SP3, SP4), 2 (SP4) and 3 (SP4, SP5) in the javelin. It found there was little significant difference in performance in time between women in 1C (SP3, SP4), 2 (SP4) and 3 in the 60 meters. It found there was little significant difference in performance in distance between women in 2 (SP4) and 3 in the discus. It found there was little significant difference in performance in distance between women in 2 (SP4) and 3 in the shot put. It found there was little significant difference in performance in time between women in 2 (SP4) and 3 in the 60 meters. It found there was little significant difference in performance in time between women in 2 (SP4) and 3 in the 200 meters. It found there was little significant difference in performance in time between women in 2 (SP4) and 3 in the 400 meters. It found there was little significant difference in performance in time between women in 2 (SP4) and 3 in the slalom. It found there was little significant difference in performance in distance between men in 2 (SP4) and 3 in the discus. It found there was little significant difference in performance in distance between men in 2 (SP4) and 3 in the javelin. It found there was little significant difference in performance in distance between men in 2 (SP4) and 3 in the shot put. It found there was little significant difference in performance in time between men in 2 (SP4) and 3 in the 100 meters. It found there was little significant difference in performance in time between men in 2 (SP4) and 3 in the 200 meters. It found there was little significant difference in performance in time between men in 2 (SP4) and 3 in the 400 meters. It found there was little significant difference in performance in distance between women in 2 (SP4), 3 and 4 in the discus. It found there was little significant difference in performance in time between men in 2 (SP4), 3 and 4 in the 100 meters. It found there was little significant difference in performance in distance between women in 2 (SP4), 3, 4,5 and 6 in the discus. It found there was little significant difference in performance in time between men in 3, 4,5 and 6 in the 200 meters. It found there was little significant difference in performance in time between women in 3, 4 and 5 in the 60 meters. It found there was little significant difference in performance in distance between men in 3 and 4 in the javelin. It found there was little significant difference in performance in distance between men in 3 and 4 in the shot put. It found there was little significant difference in performance in distance between women in 4, 5 and 6 in the discus. It found there was little significant difference in performance in distance between women in 4, 5 and 6 in the javelin. It found there was little significant difference in performance in distance between women in 4, 5 and 6 in the shot put. It found there was little significant difference in performance in distance between women in 4, 5 and 6 in the discus. It found there was little significant difference in performance in time between women in 4, 5 and 6 in the 60 meters. It found there was little significant difference in performance in time between women in 4, 5 and 6 in the 800 meters. It found there was little significant difference in performance in time between women in 4, 5 and 6 in the 1,500 meters. It found there was little significant difference in performance in time between women in 4, 5 and 6 in the slalom. It found there was little significant difference in performance in distance between men in 4, 5 and 6 in the discus. It found there was little significant difference in performance in distance between men in 4, 5 and 6 in the shot put. It found there was little significant difference in performance in time between men in 4, 5 and 6 in the 100 meters. It found there was little significant difference in performance in time between men in 4, 5 and 6 in the 800 meters. It found there was little significant difference in performance in time between men in 4, 5 and 6 in the 1,500 meters. It found there was little significant difference in performance in time between men in 4, 5 and 6 in the slalom.

== Performance and rules ==
Athletes in this class used secure frames for throwing events. The frame can be only one of two shapes: A rectangle or square. The sides must be at least 30 centimetres (12 in) long. The seat needs to be lower at the back or level, and it cannot be taller than 75 centimetres (30 in). This height includes any cushioning or padding. Throwers can have footplates on their frames, but the footplate can only be used for stability. It cannot be used to push off from. Rests can be used on the frame but they need to be present only for safety reasons and to aide in athlete stability. They need to be manufactured from rigid materials that do not move. These materials may include steel or aluminum. The backrest can have cushioning but it cannot be thicker than 5 centimetres (2.0 in). It cannot have any movable parts. The frame can also have a holding bar. The holding bar needs to be round or square, and needs to be a single straight piece. Athletes are not required to use a holding bar during their throw, and they can hold on to any part of the frame during their throw. Throwing frames should be inspected prior to the event. This should be done either in the call room or in the competition area. In general, people in this class should be allocated around 2 minutes to set up their chair.

Athletes need to throw from a seated position. They cannot throw from an inclined or other position. Doing so could increase the contribution of their legs and benefit their performance. Their legs must be in contact with the seat during the throw. If an athlete throws from a non-seated position, this is counted as a foul. People in this class cannot put tape on their hands. All straps used to hold the athlete to the frame must be non-elastic. While in the process of throwing, an athlete cannot touch a tie-down for the frame. Because of visibility issues for officials, athletes cannot wear lose clothing and they can ask athletes to tuck in clothing if they feel there is any issue with visibility. In throwing events at the Paralympic Games and World Championships, athletes get three trial throws. After that, the top 8 throwers get an additional three throws. For other events, organizers generally have the option to use that formula to give all throwers six consecutive throws. The total number of warm-up throws is at the discretion of the meet director.

== Events ==
Competitors in this class participate in javelin, shot put and discus. Because of functionality issues, in the shot put, athletes tend to use rotary movements. In the javelin and discus, they tend to use backwards and forwards movement.

== History ==
In older classification systems that predated the current system, F56 competitors were classified as lower 3, upper 4.

For the 2016 Summer Paralympics in Rio, the International Paralympic Committee had a zero classification at the Games policy. This policy was put into place in 2014, with the goal of avoiding last minute changes in classes that would negatively impact athlete training preparations. All competitors needed to be internationally classified with their classification status confirmed prior to the Games, with exceptions to this policy being dealt with on a case-by-case basis. In case there was a need for classification or reclassification at the Games despite best efforts otherwise, athletics classification was scheduled for September 4 and September 5 at Olympic Stadium. For sportspeople with physical or intellectual disabilities going through classification or reclassification in Rio, their in competition observation event is their first appearance in competition at the Games.

== Becoming classified ==
For this class, classification generally has four phase. The first stage of classification is a health examination. For amputees in this class, this is often done on site at a sports training facility or competition. The second stage is observation in practice, the third stage is observation in competition and the last stage is assigning the sportsperson to a relevant class. Sometimes the health examination may not be done on site because the nature of the amputation could cause not physically visible alterations to the body. This is especially true for lower limb amputees as it relates to how their limbs align with their hips and the impact this has on their spine and how their skull sits on their spine. During the observation phase involving training or practice, all athletes in this class may be asked to demonstrate their skills in athletics, such as running, jumping or throwing. A determination is then made as to what classification an athlete should compete in. Classifications may be Confirmed or Review status. For athletes who do not have access to a full classification panel, Provisional classification is available; this is a temporary Review classification, considered an indication of class only, and generally used only in lower levels of competition.

While some people in this class may be ambulatory, they generally go through the classification process while using a wheelchair. This is because they often compete from a seated position. Failure to do so could result in them being classified as an ambulatory class competitor. For people in this class with amputations, classification is often based on the anatomical nature of the amputation. The classification system takes several things into account when putting people into this class. These include which limbs are effected, how many limbs are effected, and how much of a limb is missing.

== Competitors ==
Sportspeople competing in this class include Bulgaria's Ruzhdi Ruzhdi, and Poland's Karol Kozun.
