= Athletics at the 2020 Summer Paralympics – Qualification =

Athletics at the 2020 Summer Paralympics were to be held at the Tokyo National Stadium between 25 August and 6 September. Following the COVID-19 pandemic they have been rescheduled to between 24 August and 5 September 2021.

== Timeline ==
As of March 2021.

Means of qualification	Date	Venue	Berths
2019 World Para Athletics Marathon Championships	28 April 2019	(United Kingdom) London	20
2019 World Para Athletics Championships	7–15 November 2019	(United Arab Emirates) Dubai	648
2020 World Para Athletics Grand Prix; Most events were cancelled due to the COVID-19 pandemic	14 – 17 March 2020	(United Arab Emirates) ~~Dubai~~	—N/a
2020 World Para Athletics Grand Prix; Most events were cancelled due to the COVID-19 pandemic	26–28 March 2020	(Brazil) ~~São Paulo~~	—N/a
2020 World Para Athletics Grand Prix; Most events were cancelled due to the COVID-19 pandemic	2–5 April 2020	(United States) ~~Mesa~~	—N/a
2020 World Para Athletics Grand Prix; Most events were cancelled due to the COVID-19 pandemic	6–8 May 2020	(France) ~~Paris~~	—N/a
2020 World Para Athletics Grand Prix; Most events were cancelled due to the COVID-19 pandemic	22–24 May 2020	(Italy) ~~Jesolo~~	—N/a
2020 World Para Athletics Grand Prix; Most events were cancelled due to the COVID-19 pandemic	28–30 May 2020	(Switzerland) ~~Nottwil~~	—N/a
2020 World Para Athletics Grand Prix; Most events were cancelled due to the COVID-19 pandemic	26–28 June 2020	(Tunisia) ~~Tunis~~	—N/a
2021 World Para Athletics Grand Prix	10–13 February 2021	(United Arab Emirates) Dubai	—N/a
2021 World Para Athletics Grand Prix	18–20 March 2021	(Tunisia) Tunis	—N/a
2021 World Para Athletics Grand Prix	16–18 April 2021	(Italy) Jesolo	—N/a
2021 World Para Athletics Grand Prix	23–25 April 2021	(China) Beijing	—N/a
2021 World Para Athletics Grand Prix	5–7 May 2021	(France) Paris	—N/a
2021 World Para Athletics Grand Prix	14–16 May 2021	(Switzerland) Nottwil	—N/a
2021 European Championships	1–5 June 2021	(Poland) Bydgoszcz	—N/a
Qualification Ranking Allocation	1 April 2019 – 1 April 2021	—	408
Representation Allocation	—	—	TBD
Marathon Qualification Ranking Allocation	—	—	10
High Performance Allocation	29 November 2019 – 6 June 2021	—	TBD
Bipartite Commission Invitation Allocation	May – June 2020	—	14
Total			1100

== Qualification ==
Allocations of qualification slots are awarded to the individual athlete, not to the NPC.

- Maximum number of slots awarded to an NPC is 45 male qualification slots and 35 female qualification slots (80 total slots). However, exception may be granted through the Bipartite Commission Invitation Allocation method which starts in early May 2021.
- An NPC can enter a maximum of three eligible athletes per medal event.
- An NPC can enter one team (four athletes per team) in a relay event.
- An NPC can enter a maximum of six eligible athletes in each marathon event - only three athletes can enter in one medal event as their only event.
- During the 2019 World Championships, the top four ranked athletes in each individual medal event (excluding marathon events) will achieve one qualification slot.

=== Athlete eligibility ===
- Athletes have to achieve one minimum entry standard (MES) performance at any World Para Athletics recognised competitions between 1 October 2018 to 1 August 2021 as shown in the qualified slots.
- During the 2019 World Championships, if an athlete is ranked first to fourth in more than one medal event, they can only obtain one qualification slots for their NPC.
- In the Qualification Ranking Allocation, the top six athletes will obtain a qualification slot in each individual medal event.

=== Event removal ===
In December 2019, the IPC removed the women's 100m T52 due to the event not meeting the minimum required eligible criteria and lack of competitors: there were only five athletes from four countries who competed at the 2019 World Para Athletics Championships one month earlier. As well as this sprint event, the NPCs were also informed about the men's high jump T64, women's javelin F13 and the universal 4 × 100 m relay because of the issues regarding the minimum eligible criteria, they would removed without replacement events being added to the medal event programme for the Games. The medal events will have 93 male, 73 female and 1 mixed however the athlete quota allocation remains unaffected at 1100 athletes.

== Qualified slots ==
=== Men's track ===
==== 100 metres ====
Event	Class(es)	Minimum Entry Standard (MES)	No. of athletes	NPC	Qualified athletes
100m T11	T11	11.90	3	Brazil (BRA)	Felipe Gomes; Daniel Mendes da Silva; Lucas Prado
100m T11	T11	11.90	1	Cameroon (CMR)	Guillaume Junior Atangana
100m T11	T11	11.90	1	China (CHN)	Di Dongdong
100m T11	T11	11.90	1	Republic of the Congo (CGO)	Emmanuel Mouambako
100m T11	T11	11.90	1	France (FRA)	Timothée Adolphe
100m T11	T11	11.90	1	Greece (GRE)	Athanasios Gavelas
100m T11	T11	11.90	1	Guinea-Bissau (GBS)	Mama Saliu Bari
100m T11	T11	11.90	1	Maldives (MDV)	Mohamed Mazin
100m T11	T11	11.90	1	Namibia (NAM)	Ananias Shikongo
100m T11	T11	11.90	1	Spain (ESP)	Gerard Descarrega Puigdevall
100m T11	T11	11.90	1	United States (USA)	David Brown
100m T11	T11	11.90	1	Venezuela (VEN)	Enderson Santos Gonzalez
Total			14		
100m T12	T12	11.50	3	Brazil (BRA)	Fabricio Junior Barros Ferreira; Joeferson Marinho de Oliveira; Kesley Teodoro
100m T12	T12	11.50	2	Morocco (MAR)	Mahdi Afri; Abdeslam Hili
100m T12	T12	11.50	1	Colombia (COL)	Yamil Acosta
100m T12	T12	11.50	1	Cuba (CUB)	Leinier Savon Pineda
100m T12	T12	11.50	1	Germany (GER)	Marcel Böttger
100m T12	T12	11.50	1	Norway (NOR)	Salum Ageze Kashafali
100m T12	T12	11.50	1	RPC (RPC)	Roman Tarasov
100m T12	T12	11.50	1	South Africa (RSA)	Ndodomzi Ntutu
100m T12	T12	11.50	1	United States (USA)	Noah Malone
Total			12		
100m T13	T13	11.50	2	Algeria (ALG)	Skander Djamil Athmani; Salah Khelaifia
100m T13	T13	11.50	2	Colombia (COL)	Buinder Bermúdez; Jean Carlos Mina Aponzá
100m T13	T13	11.50	1	Australia (AUS)	Chad Perris
100m T13	T13	11.50	1	Azerbaijan (AZE)	Elmir Jabrayilov
100m T13	T13	11.50	1	Burkina Faso (BUR)	Ferdinand Compaore
100m T13	T13	11.50	1	Canada (CAN)	Austin Ingram
100m T13	T13	11.50	1	Great Britain (GBR)	Zak Skinner
100m T13	T13	11.50	1	Guinea (GUI)	Bacou Dambakate
100m T13	T13	11.50	1	Iran (IRI)	Vahid Alinajimi
100m T13	T13	11.50	1	Ireland (IRL)	Jason Smyth
100m T13	T13	11.50	1	Laos (LAO)	Ken Thepthida
100m T13	T13	11.50	1	Mali (MLI)	Youssouf Coulibaly
100m T13	T13	11.50	1	Namibia (NAM)	Johannes Nambala
100m T13	T13	11.50	1	Switzerland (SUI)	Philipp Handler
100m T13	T13	11.50	1	United States (USA)	Isaac Jean-Paul
Total			17		
100m T33	T33	24.00	3	Great Britain (GBR)	James Freeman; Harri Jenkins; Andrew Small
100m T33	T33	24.00	1	Japan (JPN)	Yuhei Yasuno
100m T33	T33	24.00	1	Kuwait (KUW)	Ahmad Almutairi
Total			5		
100m T34	T34	17.30	2	United Arab Emirates (UAE)	Mohamed Alhammadi; Ahmed Nawad
100m T34	T34	17.30	1	Australia (AUS)	Rheed McCracken
100m T34	T34	17.30	1	Canada (CAN)	Austin Smeenk
100m T34	T34	17.30	1	China (CHN)	Wang Yang
100m T34	T34	17.30	1	Finland (FIN)	Henry Manni
100m T34	T34	17.30	1	Great Britain (GBR)	Ben Rowlings
100m T34	T34	17.30	1	Thailand (THA)	Chaiwat Rattana
100m T34	T34	17.30	1	Tunisia (TUN)	Walid Ktila
Total			9		
100m T35	T35	15.60	3	RPC (RPC)	David Dzhatiev; Artem Kalashian; Dmitrii Safronov
100m T35	T35	15.60	1	Argentina (ARG)	Hernan Barreto
100m T35	T35	15.60	1	Brazil (BRA)	Fabio Bordignon
100m T35	T35	15.60	1	Ukraine (UKR)	Ihor Tsvietov
100m T35	T35	15.60	1	United States (USA)	Marshall Zackery
Total			7		
100m T36	T36	13.70	2	Brazil (BRA)	Aser Mateus Almeida Ramos; Rodrigo Parreira da Silva
100m T36	T36	13.70	2	China (CHN)	Deng Peicheng; Yang Yifei
100m T36	T36	13.70	2	RPC (RPC)	Evgenii Shvetsov; Evgenii Torsunov
100m T36	T36	13.70	2	Ukraine (UKR)	Oleksandr Lytvynenko; Roman Pavlyk
100m T36	T36	13.70	1	Argentina (ARG)	Alexis Sebastian Chavez
100m T36	T36	13.70	1	Australia (AUS)	James Turner
100m T36	T36	13.70	1	Greece (GRE)	Loukas Ioanni Protonotarios
100m T36	T36	13.70	1	Japan (JPN)	Takeru Matsumoto
100m T36	T36	13.70	1	Malaysia (MAS)	Mohamad Ridzuan Mohamad Puzi
100m T36	T36	13.70	1	Oman (OMA)	Taha Al-Harrasi
100m T36	T36	13.70	1	Poland (POL)	Krzysztof Ciuksza
Total			15		
100m T37	T37	12.80	3	Brazil (BRA)	Mateus Evangelista Cardoso; Ricardo Gomes de Mendonca; Christian Gabriel Luiz da Costa
100m T37	T37	12.80	2	RPC (RUS)	Chermen Kobesov; Andrei Vdovin
100m T37	T37	12.80	1	Argentina (ARG)	Brian Lionel Impellizzeri
100m T37	T37	12.80	1	El Salvador (ESA)	David Pleitez
100m T37	T37	12.80	1	Indonesia (INA)	Saptoyoga Purnomo
100m T37	T37	12.80	1	Saudi Arabia (KSA)	Ali Alnakhli
100m T37	T37	12.80	1	South Africa (RSA)	Charl du Toit
100m T37	T37	12.80	1	Ukraine (UKR)	Vladyslav Zahrebelnyi
100m T37	T37	12.80	1	United States (USA)	Nicholas Mayhugh
Total			12		
100m T38	T38	12.50	3	China (CHN)	Zhong Huanghao; Zhou Peng; Zhu Dening
100m T38	T38	12.50	2	Australia (AUS)	Ari Gesini; Evan O'Hanlon
100m T38	T38	12.50	2	Colombia (COL)	Juan Gómez Coa; José Lemos
100m T38	T38	12.50	1	Brazil (BRA)	Edson Pinheiro
100m T38	T38	12.50	1	France (FRA)	Dimitri Jozwicki
100m T38	T38	12.50	1	Great Britain (GBR)	Thomas Young
100m T38	T38	12.50	1	Honduras (HON)	Carlos Velasquez
100m T38	T38	12.50	1	Mexico (MEX)	Jose Rodolfo Chessani Garcia
100m T38	T38	12.50	1	RPC (RPC)	Khetag Khinchagov
100m T38	T38	12.50	1	South Africa (RSA)	Dyan Buis
100m T38	T38	12.50	1	Tunisia (TUN)	Mohamed Farhat Chida
Total			15		
100m T47	T45; T46; T47	11.60	3	Brazil (BRA)	Lucas de Sousa Lima; Petrucio Ferreira dos Santos; Washington Junior
100m T47	T45; T46; T47	11.60	2	United States (USA)	Roderick Townsend; Tanner Wright
100m T47	T45; T46; T47	11.60	1	Australia (AUS)	Jaydon Page
100m T47	T45; T46; T47	11.60	1	Benin (BEN)	Fayssal Atchiba
100m T47	T45; T46; T47	11.60	1	China (CHN)	Wang Hao
100m T47	T45; T46; T47	11.60	1	Gabon (GAB)	Davy Moukagni
100m T47	T45; T46; T47	11.60	1	Great Britain (GBR)	Ola Abidogun
100m T47	T45; T46; T47	11.60	1	Japan (JPN)	Kakeru Ishida
100m T47	T45; T46; T47	11.60	1	Malta (MLT)	Thomas Borg
100m T47	T45; T46; T47	11.60	1	Niger (NIG)	Ibrahim Dayabou
100m T47	T45; T46; T47	11.60	1	Nigeria (NGR)	Suwaibidu Galadima
100m T47	T45; T46; T47	11.60	1	Poland (POL)	Michal Derus
Total			15		
100m T51	T51	28.00	2	Belgium (BEL)	Peter Genyn; Roger Habsch
100m T51	T51	28.00	2	Portugal (POR)	João Correia; Helder Mestre
100m T51	T51	28.00	1	Algeria (ALG)	Mohamed Berrahal
100m T51	T51	28.00	1	Costa Rica (CRC)	Ernesto Fonseca
100m T51	T51	28.00	1	Finland (FIN)	Toni Piispanen
100m T51	T51	28.00	1	Mexico (MEX)	Edgar Cesareo Navarro Sanchez
Total			8		
100m T52	T52	20.00	3	United States (USA)	Gianfranco Iannotta; Raymond Martin; Isaiah Rigo
100m T52	T52	20.00	1	Australia (AUS)	Sam McIntosh
100m T52	T52	20.00	1	Japan (JPN)	Yuki Oya
100m T52	T52	20.00	1	Mexico (MEX)	Leonardo de Jesus Perez Juarez
100m T52	T52	20.00	1	Philippines (PHI)	Jerrold Mangliwan
100m T52	T52	20.00	1	Switzerland (SUI)	Beat Bosch
Total			8		
100m T53	T53	16.20	2	France (FRA)	Nicolas Brignone; Pierre Fairbank
100m T53	T53	16.20	2	Saudi Arabia (KSA)	Fahad Alganaidl; Abdulrahmen Alqurashi
100m T53	T53	16.20	2	Thailand (THA)	Pichet Krungget; Pongsakorn Paeyo
100m T53	T53	16.20	1	Brazil (BRA)	Ariosvaldo Fernandes da Silva
100m T53	T53	16.20	1	Canada (CAN)	Brent Lakatos
100m T53	T53	16.20	1	China (CHN)	Yang Shaoqiao
100m T53	T53	16.20	1	Mongolia (MGL)	Enkhmanlai Purevtsog
100m T53	T53	16.20	1	RPC (RPC)	Vitalii Gritsenko
100m T53	T53	16.20	1	South Korea (KOR)	Yoo Byunghoon
100m T53	T53	16.20	1	United States (USA)	Brian Siemann
Total			13		
100m T54	T54	14.70	3	China (CHN)	Hu Yang; Liu Yang; Zhang Ying
100m T54	T54	14.70	2	Australia (AUS)	Luke Bailey; Sam Carter
100m T54	T54	14.70	2	Finland (FIN)	Esa-Pekka Mattila; Leo Pekka Tahti
100m T54	T54	14.70	2	Thailand (THA)	Saichon Konjen; Athiwat Paeng-Nuea
100m T54	T54	14.70	2	United States (USA)	Erik Hightower; Daniel Romanchuk
100m T54	T54	14.70	1	Argentina (ARG)	Gabriel Emmanuel Sosa
100m T54	T54	14.70	1	Armenia (ARM)	Stas Nazaryan
100m T54	T54	14.70	1	Cambodia (CAM)	Van Vun
100m T54	T54	14.70	1	The Gambia (GAM)	Malang Tamba
100m T54	T54	14.70	1	Indonesia (INA)	Jaenal Aripin
100m T54	T54	14.70	1	Japan (JPN)	Tomoki Ikoma
100m T54	T54	14.70	1	Mexico (MEX)	Juan Pablo Cervantes Garcia
100m T54	T54	14.70	1	Netherlands (NED)	Kenny van Weeghel
Total			19		
100m T63	T42; T63	15.60	2	Japan (JPN)	Junta Kosuda; Atsushi Yamamoto
100m T63	T42; T63	15.60	1	Australia (AUS)	Scott Reardon
100m T63	T42; T63	15.60	1	Brazil (BRA)	Vinicius Goncalves Rodrigues
100m T63	T42; T63	15.60	1	Denmark (DEN)	Daniel Jørgensen
100m T63	T42; T63	15.60	1	Germany (GER)	Leon Schaefer
100m T63	T42; T63	15.60	1	Italy (ITA)	Alessandro Ossola
100m T63	T42; T63	15.60	1	Netherlands (NED)	Joël de Jong
100m T63	T42; T63	15.60	1	RPC (RPC)	Anton Prokhorov
100m T63	T42; T63	15.60	1	South Africa (RSA)	Puseletso Michael Mabote
Total			10		
100m T64	T44; T62/64	12.00	3	Germany (GER)	David Behre; Johannes Floors; Felix Streng
100m T64	T44; T62/64	12.00	3	South Africa (RSA)	Daniel du Plessis; Mpumelelo Mhlongo; Tebogo Mofokeng
100m T64	T44; T62/64	12.00	3	United States (USA)	Jonathan Gore; Jarryd Wallace; Hunter Woodhall
100m T64	T44; T62/64	12.00	1	Brazil (BRA)	Alan Fonteles Cardoso Oliveira
100m T64	T44; T62/64	12.00	1	Costa Rica (CRC)	Sherman Isidro Guity Guity
100m T64	T44; T62/64	12.00	1	Great Britain (GBR)	Jonnie Peacock
100m T64	T44; T62/64	12.00	1	Greece (GRE)	Michail Seitis
100m T64	T44; T62/64	12.00	1	Japan (JPN)	Kengo Oshima
100m T64	T44; T62/64	12.00	1	Netherlands (NED)	Olivier Hendriks
Total			15		

==== 200 metres ====
Event	Class(es)	Minimum Entry Standard (MES)	No. of athletes	NPC	Qualified athletes
200m T35	T35	32.00	3	RPC (RPC)	David Dzhatiev; Artem Kalashian; Dmitrii Safronov
200m T35	T35	32.00	1	Argentina (ARG)	Hernan Barreto
200m T35	T35	32.00	1	Brazil (BRA)	Fabio Bordignon
200m T35	T35	32.00	1	Ukraine (UKR)	Ihor Tsvietov
200m T35	T35	32.00	1	United States (USA)	Marshall Zackery
Total			7		
200m T37	T37	26.00	3	Brazil (BRA)	Vitor Antonio de Jesus; Ricardo Gomes de Mendonca; Christian Gabriel Luiz da Costa
200m T37	T37	26.00	2	RPC (RPC)	Chermen Kobesov; Andrei Vdovin
200m T37	T37	26.00	1	Argentina (ARG)	Brian Lionel Impellizzeri
200m T37	T37	26.00	1	El Salvador (ESA)	David Pleitez
200m T37	T37	26.00	1	Indonesia (INA)	Saptoyoga Purnomo
200m T37	T37	26.00	1	Poland (POL)	Michal Kotkowski
200m T37	T37	26.00	1	Saudi Arabia (KSA)	Ali Alnakhli
200m T37	T37	26.00	1	South Africa (RSA)	Charl du Toit
200m T37	T37	26.00	1	Ukraine (UKR)	Yaroslav Okapinskyi
200m T37	T37	26.00	1	United States (USA)	Nicholas Mayhugh
Total			13		
200m T51	T51	51.00	2	Belgium (BEL)	Peter Genyn; Roger Habsch
200m T51	T51	51.00	1	Algeria (ALG)	Mohamed Berrahal
200m T51	T51	51.00	1	Costa Rica (CRC)	Ernesto Fonseca
200m T51	T51	51.00	1	Finland (FIN)	Toni Piispanen
200m T51	T51	51.00	1	Mexico (MEX)	Edgar Cesareo Navarro Sanchez
200m T51	T51	51.00	1	Portugal (POR)	Helder Mestre
Total			7		
200m T61	T61	28.50	2	United States (USA)	Luis Puertas; Regas Woods Sr
200m T61	T61	28.50	1	Germany (GER)	Ali Lacin
200m T61	T61	28.50	1	Great Britain (GBR)	Richard Whitehead
200m T61	T61	28.50	1	South Africa (RSA)	Ntando Mahlangu
Total			5		
200m T64	T44; T64	25.10	3	United States (USA)	Jonathan Gore; Trenten Merrill; Jarryd Wallace
200m T64	T44; T64	25.10	1	Costa Rica (CRC)	Sherman Isidro Guity Guity
200m T64	T44; T64	25.10	1	Germany (GER)	David Behre
200m T64	T44; T64	25.10	1	Greece (GRE)	Michail Seitis
200m T64	T44; T64	25.10	1	Japan (JPN)	Kengo Oshima
200m T64	T44; T64	25.10	1	Lebanon (LBN)	Arz Zahreddine
200m T64	T44; T64	25.10	1	Netherlands (NED)	Levi Vloet
200m T64	T44; T64	25.10	1	South Africa (RSA)	Mpumelelo Mhlongo
Total			10		

==== 400 metres ====
Event	Class(es)	Minimum Entry Standard (MES)	No. of athletes	NPC	Qualified athletes
400m T11	T11	57.00	2	Brazil (BRA)	Daniel Mendes Da Silva; Felipe Gomes
400m T11	T11	57.00	2	Cameroon (CMR)	Guillaume Junior Atangana; Charles Atangana Ntsama
400m T11	T11	57.00	2	France (FRA)	Timothée Adolphe; Gauthier Makunda
400m T11	T11	57.00	2	Spain (ESP)	Gerard Descarrega Puigdevall; Eduardo Uceda Novas
400m T11	T11	57.00	1	Iceland (ISL)	Patrekur Axelsson
400m T11	T11	57.00	1	Namibia (NAM)	Ananias Shikongo
400m T11	T11	57.00	1	Venezuela (VEN)	Enderson Santos Gonzalez
Total			11		
400m T12	T12	54.00	2	Morocco (MAR)	Mahdi Afri; Abdeslam Hili
400m T12	T12	54.00	2	Tunisia (TUN)	Rouay Jebabli; Achraf Lahouel
400m T12	T12	54.00	1	Brazil (BRA)	Fabricio Junior Barros Ferreira
400m T12	T12	54.00	1	Colombia (COL)	Yamil Acosta
400m T12	T12	54.00	1	Turkey (TUR)	Oguz Akbulut
400m T12	T12	54.00	1	United States (USA)	Noah Malone
Total			8		
400m T13	T13	54.00	2	Algeria (ALG)	Skander Djamil Athmani; Abdellatif Baka
400m T13	T13	54.00	2	Morocco (MAR)	Mohamed Amguoun; Mouncef Bouja
400m T13	T13	54.00	2	RPC (RPC)	Egor Sharov; Aleksandr Shirin
400m T13	T13	54.00	1	Azerbaijan (AZE)	Elmir Jabrayilov
400m T13	T13	54.00	1	Botswana (BOT)	Edwin Masuge
400m T13	T13	54.00	1	Colombia (COL)	Buinder Bermúdez
400m T13	T13	54.00	1	Iran (IRI)	Vahid Alinajimi
400m T13	T13	54.00	1	Mexico (MEX)	Jorge Benjamin Gonzalez Sauceda
400m T13	T13	54.00	1	Mozambique (MOZ)	Hilario Chavela
400m T13	T13	54.00	1	Namibia (NAM)	Johannes Nambala
400m T13	T13	54.00	1	Turkey (TUR)	Hakan Cira
400m T13	T13	54.00	1	United States (USA)	Joel Gomez
Total			15		
400m T20	T20	52.60	2	Brazil (BRA)	Gustavo Henrique de Oliveira Dias; Daniel Tavares Martins
400m T20	T20	52.60	2	Ecuador (ECU)	Damian Josue Carcelen Delgado; Anderson Alexander Colorado Mina
400m T20	T20	52.60	2	Venezuela (VEN)	Edixon Eduardo Pirela Yepez; Luis Felipe Rodriguez Bolivar
400m T20	T20	52.60	1	France (FRA)	Charles-Antoine Kouakou
400m T20	T20	52.60	1	Great Britain (GBR)	Columba Blango
400m T20	T20	52.60	1	Italy (ITA)	Ndiaga Dieng
400m T20	T20	52.60	1	Jamaica (JAM)	Alberto Campbell
400m T20	T20	52.60	1	Panama (PAN)	Jhan Carlos Wisdom Lungrin
400m T20	T20	52.60	1	Portugal (POR)	Sandro Patricio Correia Baessa
400m T20	T20	52.60	1	Spain (ESP)	Deliber Rodriguez Ramirez
Total			13		
400m T36	T36	1:04.00	1	Algeria (ALG)	Sid Ali Bouzourine
400m T36	T36	1:04.00	1	Argentina (ARG)	Alexis Sebastian Chavez
400m T36	T36	1:04.00	1	Australia (AUS)	James Turner
400m T36	T36	1:04.00	1	Japan (JPN)	Takeru Matsumoto
400m T36	T36	1:04.00	1	New Zealand (NZL)	William Stedman
400m T36	T36	1:04.00	1	Poland (POL)	Krzysztof Ciuksza
400m T36	T36	1:04.00	1	RPC (RUS)	Evgenii Shvetsov
Total			7		
400m T37	T37	1:00.00	2	RPC (RUS)	Chermen Kobesov; Andrei Vdovin
400m T37	T37	1:00.00	1	Poland (POL)	Michal Kotkowski
400m T37	T37	1:00.00	1	South Africa (RSA)	Charl du Toit
400m T37	T37	1:00.00	1	Ukraine (UKR)	Yaroslav Okapinskyi
400m T37	T37	1:00.00	1	United States (USA)	Nicholas Mayhugh
Total			6		
400m T38	T38	1:00.00	1	Brazil (BRA)	Edson Cavalcante Pinheiro
400m T38	T38	1:00.00	1	Canada (CAN)	Zachary Gingras
400m T38	T38	1:00.00	1	Colombia (COL)	Dixon Hooker
400m T38	T38	1:00.00	1	Great Britain (GBR)	Shaun Burrows
400m T38	T38	1:00.00	1	Honduras (HON)	Carlos Velasquez
400m T38	T38	1:00.00	1	Iraq (IRQ)	Ali Al-Rikabi
400m T38	T38	1:00.00	1	Mexico (MEX)	Jose Rodolfo Chessani Garcia
400m T38	T38	1:00.00	1	Nicaragua (NCA)	Carlos Alberto Castillo
400m T38	T38	1:00.00	1	RPC (RPC)	Anton Feoktistov
400m T38	T38	1:00.00	1	South Africa (RSA)	Dyan Buis
400m T38	T38	1:00.00	1	Tunisia (TUN)	Mohamed Farhat Chida
Total			11		
400m T47	T45; T46; T47	53.50	3	Brazil (BRA)	Thomaz Ruan de Moraes; Lucas de Sousa Lima; Petrucio Ferreira dos Santos
400m T47	T45; T46; T47	53.50	2	United States (USA)	Rayven Sample; Tanner Wright
400m T47	T45; T46; T47	53.50	1	Canada (CAN)	Thomas Normandeau
400m T47	T45; T46; T47	53.50	1	China (CHN)	Wang Hao
400m T47	T45; T46; T47	53.50	1	Cyprus (CYP)	Andonis Aresti
400m T47	T45; T46; T47	53.50	1	Dominican Republic (DOM)	Luis Andres Vasquez Segura
400m T47	T45; T46; T47	53.50	1	Japan (JPN)	Kakeru Ishida
400m T47	T45; T46; T47	53.50	1	Malta (MLT)	Thomas Borg
400m T47	T45; T46; T47	53.50	1	Morocco (MAR)	Ayoub Sadni
400m T47	T45; T46; T47	53.50	1	São Tomé and Príncipe (STP)	Alex Anjos
400m T47	T45; T46; T47	53.50	1	Sri Lanka (SRI)	Saman Subasinghe
Total			14		
400m T52	T51; T52	1.30.00	3	United States (USA)	Gianfranco Iannotta; Raymond Martin; Isaiah Rigo
400m T52	T51; T52	1.30.00	2	Japan (JPN)	Tomoki Sato; Hirokazu Ueyonabaru
400m T52	T51; T52	1.30.00	2	Mexico (MEX)	Edgar Cesareo Navarro Sanchez; Leonardo de Jesus Perez Juarez
400m T52	T51; T52	1.30.00	1	Australia (AUS)	Sam McIntosh
400m T52	T51; T52	1.30.00	1	Austria (AUT)	Thomas Geierspichler
400m T52	T51; T52	1.30.00	1	Philippines (PHI)	Jerrold Mangliwan
Total			10		
400m T53	T53	54.00	3	Thailand (THA)	Masaberee Arsae; Pongsakorn Paeyo; Pichet Krungget
400m T53	T53	54.00	2	France (FRA)	Nicolas Brignone; Pierre Fairbank
400m T53	T53	54.00	2	United States (USA)	Joshua George; Brian Siemann
400m T53	T53	54.00	1	Brazil (BRA)	Ariosvaldo Fernandes da Silva
400m T53	T53	54.00	1	Canada (CAN)	Brent Lakatos
400m T53	T53	54.00	1	China (CHN)	Yang Shaoqiao
400m T53	T53	54.00	1	Japan (JPN)	Tomoya Ito
400m T53	T53	54.00	1	RPC (RPC)	Vitalii Gritsenko
400m T53	T53	54.00	1	Saudi Arabia (KSA)	Adbulrahman Alqurashi
400m T53	T53	54.00	1	South Korea (KOR)	Yoo Byung-hoon
Total			14		
400m T54	T54	48.50	3	China (CHN)	Dai Yunqiang; Liu Yang; Zhang Yong
400m T54	T54	48.50	3	Great Britain (GBR)	Richard Chiassaro; Nathan Maguire; Daniel Sidbury
400m T54	T54	48.50	3	Thailand (THA)	Putharet Khongrak; Saichon Konjen; Athiwat Paeng-Nuea
400m T54	T54	48.50	1	Australia (AUS)	Sam Carter
400m T54	T54	48.50	1	Finland (FIN)	Leo Pekka Tahti
400m T54	T54	48.50	1	France (FRA)	Julien Casoli
400m T54	T54	48.50	1	The Gambia (GAM)	Malang Tamba
400m T54	T54	48.50	1	Indonesia (INA)	Jaenal Aripin
400m T54	T54	48.50	1	Mexico (MEX)	Juan Pablo Cervantes Garcia
400m T54	T54	48.50	1	Netherlands (NED)	Kenny van Weeghel
400m T54	T54	48.50	1	RPC (RPC)	Aleksei Bychenok
400m T54	T54	48.50	1	United States (USA)	Daniel Romanchuk
Total			18		
400m T62	T62	1:10.00	2	United States (USA)	Nick Rogers; Hunter Woodhall
400m T62	T62	1:10.00	2	Greece (GRE)	Stylianos Malakopoulos; Ioannis Sevdikalis
400m T62	T62	1:10.00	2	South Africa (RSA)	Daniel Du Plessis; Tebogo Mofokeng
400m T62	T62	1:10.00	1	Germany (GER)	Johannes Floors
400m T62	T62	1:10.00	1	Netherlands (NED)	Olivier Hendriks
Total			8		

==== 800 metres ====
Event	Class(es)	Minimum Entry Standard (MES)	No. of athletes	NPC	Qualified athletes
800m T34	T33; T34	2:03.00	2	Great Britain (GBR)	Ben Rowlings; Isaac Towers
800m T34	T33; T34	2:03.00	2	United Arab Emirates (UAE)	Mohamed Alhammadi; Ahmed Nawad
800m T34	T33; T34	2:03.00	1	Australia (AUS)	Rheed McCracken
800m T34	T33; T34	2:03.00	1	Canada (CAN)	Austin Smeenk
800m T34	T33; T34	2:03.00	1	China (CHN)	Wang Yang
800m T34	T33; T34	2:03.00	1	Finland (FIN)	Henry Manni
800m T34	T33; T34	2:03.00	1	Thailand (THA)	Chaiwat Rattana
800m T34	T33; T34	2:03.00	1	Tunisia (TUN)	Walid Ktila
Total			10		
800m T53	T53	1:51.00	3	Thailand (THA)	Masaberee Arsae; Pongsakorn Paeyo; Pichet Krungget
800m T53	T53	1:51.00	2	France (FRA)	Nicolas Brignone; Pierre Fairbank
800m T53	T53	1:51.00	2	United States (USA)	Joshua George; Brian Siemann
800m T53	T53	1:51.00	1	Canada (CAN)	Brent Lakatos
800m T53	T53	1:51.00	1	China (CHN)	Yang Shaoqiao
800m T53	T53	1:51.00	1	RPC (RPC)	Vitalii Gritsenko
800m T53	T53	1:51.00	1	South Korea (KOR)	Yoo Byung-hoon
Total			11		
800m T54	T54	1:37.00	3	China (CHN)	Dai Yunqiang; Song Lei; Zhang Yong
800m T54	T54	1:37.00	3	Great Britain (GBR)	Richard Chiassaro; Nathan Maguire; Daniel Sidbury
800m T54	T54	1:37.00	3	Thailand (THA)	Putharet Khongrak; Saichon Konjen; Prawat Wahoram
800m T54	T54	1:37.00	2	United States (USA)	Aaron Pike; Daniel Romanchuk
800m T54	T54	1:37.00	1	France (FRA)	Julien Casoli
800m T54	T54	1:37.00	1	Germany (GER)	Alhassane Baldé
800m T54	T54	1:37.00	1	Japan (JPN)	Tomoki Suzuki
800m T54	T54	1:37.00	1	Netherlands (NED)	Kenny van Weeghel
800m T54	T54	1:37.00	1	RPC (RPC)	Aleksei Bychenok
800m T54	T54	1:37.00	1	Switzerland (SUI)	Marcel Hug
800m T54	T54	1:37.00	1	Tunisia (TUN)	Yassine Gharbi
Total			18		

==== 1500 metres ====
Event	Class(es)	Minimum Entry Standard (MES)	No. of athletes	NPC	Qualified athletes
1500m T11	T11	4:32.00	2	Brazil (BRA)	Julio Cesar Agripino dos Santos; Yeltsin Jacques
1500m T11	T11	4:32.00	2	Japan (JPN)	Kenya Karasawa; Shinya Wada
1500m T11	T11	4:32.00	2	Kenya (KEN)	Erick Kiptoo Sang; Wilson Bii
1500m T11	T11	4:32.00	1	Chile (CHI)	Cristian Valenzuela
1500m T11	T11	4:32.00	1	Ecuador (ECU)	Darwin Gustavo Castro Reyes
1500m T11	T11	4:32.00	1	Peru (PER)	Guillen Rosbil
1500m T11	T11	4:32.00	1	Poland (POL)	Aleksander Kossakowski
1500m T11	T11	4:32.00	1	RPC (RPC)	Fedor Rudakov
Total			11		
1500m T13	T12; T13	4:08.00	3	RPC (RPC)	Aleksandr Kostin; Anton Kuliatin; Egor Sharov
1500m T13	T12; T13	4:08.00	2	Australia (AUS)	Jaryd Clifford; Sam Harding
1500m T13	T12; T13	4:08.00	2	Tunisia (TUN)	Rouay Jebabli; Achraf Lahouel
1500m T13	T12; T13	4:08.00	1	Algeria (ALG)	Abdellatif Baka
1500m T13	T12; T13	4:08.00	1	Ethiopia (ETH)	Tamiru Demisse
1500m T13	T12; T13	4:08.00	1	Spain (ESP)	Yassine Ouhdadi El Ataby
1500m T13	T12; T13	4:08.00	1	United States (USA)	Joel Gomez
Total			11		
1500m T20	T20	4:12.00	3	Japan (JPN)	Daiki Akai; Yuki Iwata; Yuji Togawa
1500m T20	T20	4:12.00	2	Portugal (POR)	Sandro Patricio Correia Baessa; Cristiano Pereira
1500m T20	T20	4:12.00	2	RPC (RPC)	Alexander Rabotnitskiy; Pavel Sarkeev
1500m T20	T20	4:12.00	1	France (FRA)	Gael Geffroy
1500m T20	T20	4:12.00	1	Great Britain (GBR)	Owen Miller
1500m T20	T20	4:12.00	1	Italy (ITA)	Ndiaga Dieng
1500m T20	T20	4:12.00	1	Poland (POL)	Daniel Pek
1500m T20	T20	4:12.00	1	Puerto Rico (PUR)	Carmelo Rivera Fuentes
1500m T20	T20	4:12.00	1	Ukraine (UKR)	Pavlo Voluikevych
1500m T20	T20	4:12.00	1	United States (USA)	Mikey Brannigan
Total			14		
1500m T38	T37; T38	4:45.00	2	Australia (AUS)	Daniel Bounty; Deon Kenzie
1500m T38	T37; T38	4:45.00	2	Canada (CAN)	Nathan Riech; Liam Stanley
1500m T38	T37; T38	4:45.00	2	France (FRA)	Redouane Hennouni- Bouzidi; Louis Radius
1500m T38	T37; T38	4:45.00	1	Algeria (ALG)	Abdelkrim Krai
1500m T38	T37; T38	4:45.00	1	Ireland (IRL)	Michael McKillop
1500m T38	T37; T38	4:45.00	1	Nicaragua (NCA)	Carlos Alberto Castillo
Total			9		
1500m T46	T45; T46	4:26.00	1	Algeria (ALG)	Samir Nouioua
1500m T46	T45; T46	4:26.00	1	Angola (ANG)	Manuel Ernestro Jaime
1500m T46	T45; T46	4:26.00	1	Bulgaria (BUL)	Hristiyan Stoyanov
1500m T46	T45; T46	4:26.00	1	Burundi (BDI)	Remy Nikobimeze
1500m T46	T45; T46	4:26.00	1	China (CHN)	Li Chaoyan
1500m T46	T45; T46	4:26.00	1	Denmark (DEN)	Christian Lykkeby Olsen
1500m T46	T45; T46	4:26.00	1	Ethiopia (ETH)	Gemuchu Amenu Dinsa
1500m T46	T45; T46	4:26.00	1	Great Britain (GBR)	Luke Nuttall
1500m T46	T45; T46	4:26.00	1	Kenya (KEN)	Felix Kipruto
1500m T46	T45; T46	4:26.00	1	RPC (RPC)	Aleksandr Iaremchuk
1500m T46	T45; T46	4:26.00	1	Rwanda (RWA)	Hermas Muvunyi
1500m T46	T45; T46	4:26.00	1	Uganda (UGA)	David Emong
Total			12		
1500m T52	T51; T52	5:20.00	2	Japan (JPN)	Tomoki Sato; Hirokazu Ueyonabaru
1500m T52	T51; T52	5:20.00	2	United States (USA)	Raymond Martin; Isaiah Rigo
1500m T52	T51; T52	5:20.00	1	Austria (AUT)	Thomas Geierspichler
1500m T52	T51; T52	5:20.00	1	Mexico (MEX)	Leonardo De Jesus Perez Juarez
1500m T52	T51; T52	5:20.00	1	Philippines (PHI)	Jerrold Mangliwan
Total			7		
1500m T54	T53; T54	3:07.00	3	China (CHN)	Dai Yunqiang; Zhang Ying; Zhang Yong
1500m T54	T53; T54	3:07.00	3	Great Britain (GBR)	Richard Chiassaro; Daniel Sidbury; David Weir
1500m T54	T53; T54	3:07.00	3	United States (USA)	Aaron Pike; Daniel Romanchuk; Brian Siemann
1500m T54	T53; T54	3:07.00	2	Japan (JPN)	Masayuki Higuchi; Tomoki Suzuki
1500m T54	T53; T54	3:07.00	2	RPC (RPC)	Aleksei Bychenok; Vitalii Gritsenko
1500m T54	T53; T54	3:07.00	2	Thailand (THA)	Putharet Khongrak; Prawat Wahoram
1500m T54	T53; T54	3:07.00	1	Canada (CAN)	Brent Lakatos
1500m T54	T53; T54	3:07.00	1	France (FRA)	Julien Casoli
1500m T54	T53; T54	3:07.00	1	Germany (GER)	Alhassane Baldé
1500m T54	T53; T54	3:07.00	1	Switzerland (SUI)	Marcel Hug
Total			19		

==== 5000 metres ====
Event	Class(es)	Minimum Entry Standard (MES)	No. of athletes	NPC	Qualified athletes
5000m T11	T11	16:55.00	2	Brazil (BRA)	Julio Cesar Agripino dos Santos; Yeltsin Jacques
5000m T11	T11	16:55.00	2	Japan (JPN)	Kenya Karasawa; Shinya Wada
5000m T11	T11	16:55.00	2	Kenya (KEN)	Rodgers Kirop; Wilson Bii
5000m T11	T11	16:55.00	1	Chile (CHI)	Cristian Valenzuela
5000m T11	T11	16:55.00	1	Ecuador (ECU)	Darwin Gustavo Castro Reyes
5000m T11	T11	16:55.00	1	Peru (PER)	Guillen Rosbil
5000m T11	T11	16:55.00	1	RPC (RPC)	Fedor Rudakov
Total			10		
5000m T13	T12; T13	15:57.00	3	Morocco (MAR)	El Amin Chentouf; Hicham Hanyn; Mohamed Fouad Yazami
5000m T13	T12; T13	15:57.00	2	Tunisia (TUN)	Wajdi Boukhili; Hatem Nasrallah
5000m T13	T12; T13	15:57.00	1	Australia (AUS)	Jaryd Clifford
5000m T13	T12; T13	15:57.00	1	Canada (CAN)	Guillaume Ouellet
5000m T13	T12; T13	15:57.00	1	Great Britain (GBR)	David Devine
5000m T13	T12; T13	15:57.00	1	RPC (RUS)	Aleksandr Kostin
5000m T13	T12; T13	15:57.00	1	Spain (ESP)	Yassine Ouhdadi El Ataby
Total			10		
5000m T54	T53; T54	10:50.00	3	China (CHN)	Dai Yunqiang; Hu Yang; Zhang Yong
5000m T54	T53; T54	10:50.00	3	United States (USA)	Aaron Pike; Daniel Romanchuk; Brian Siemann
5000m T54	T53; T54	10:50.00	2	Great Britain (GBR)	Daniel Sidbury; David Weir
5000m T54	T53; T54	10:50.00	2	Japan (JPN)	Masayuki Higuchi; Kozo Kubo
5000m T54	T53; T54	10:50.00	2	Thailand (THA)	Putharet Khongrak; Prawat Wahoram
5000m T54	T53; T54	10:50.00	1	Canada (CAN)	Brent Lakatos
5000m T54	T53; T54	10:50.00	1	France (FRA)	Julien Casoli
5000m T54	T53; T54	10:50.00	1	Germany (GER)	Alhassane Baldé
5000m T54	T53; T54	10:50.00	1	RPC (RPC)	Aleksei Bychenok
5000m T54	T53; T54	10:50.00	1	Switzerland (SUI)	Marcel Hug
Total			17		

==== Marathon ====
Event	Class(es)	Minimum Entry Standard (MES)	No. of athletes	NPC	Qualified athletes
Marathon T12	T11; T12	3:00:00	3	Japan (JPN)	Tadashi Horikoshi; Yutaka Kumagai; Shinya Wada
Marathon T12	T11; T12	3:00:00	2	Morocco (MAR)	El Amin Chentouf; Hicham Hanyn
Marathon T12	T11; T12	3:00:00	2	Spain (ESP)	Alberto Suarez Laso; Gustavo Nieves
Marathon T12	T11; T12	3:00:00	2	Tunisia (TUN)	Wajdi Boukhili; Hatem Nasrallah
Marathon T12	T11; T12	3:00:00	1	Algeria (ALG)	Nacer-Eddine Karfas
Marathon T12	T11; T12	3:00:00	1	Australia (AUS)	Jaryd Clifford
Marathon T12	T11; T12	3:00:00	1	Brazil (BRA)	Yeltsin Jacques
Marathon T12	T11; T12	3:00:00	1	RPC (RPC)	Denis Gavrilov
Total			13		
Marathon T46	T45; T46	3:00:00	2	China (CHN)	Li Chaoyan; Zhao Guocun
Marathon T46	T45; T46	3:00:00	2	Peru (PER)	Carlos Ivan Sangama; Efrain Sotacuro
Marathon T46	T45; T46	3:00:00	1	Australia (AUS)	Michael Roeger
Marathon T46	T45; T46	3:00:00	1	Brazil (BRA)	Alex Pires Da Silva
Marathon T46	T45; T46	3:00:00	1	Faroe Islands (FAR)	Havard Vatnhamar
Marathon T46	T45; T46	3:00:00	1	Great Britain (GBR)	Derek Rae
Marathon T46	T45; T46	3:00:00	1	Japan (JPN)	Tsutomu Nagata
Marathon T46	T45; T46	3:00:00	1	Morocco (MAR)	Abdelhadi El Harti
Marathon T46	T45; T46	3:00:00	1	Portugal (POR)	Manuel Mendes
Marathon T46	T45; T46	3:00:00	1	RPC (RPC)	Aleksandr Iaremchuk
Total			12		
Marathon T54	T52; T53; T54	1:35:00	4	China (CHN)	Dai Yunqiang; Yang Shaoqiao; Zhang Ying; Zhang Yong
Marathon T54	T52; T53; T54	1:35:00	3	United States (USA)	Aaron Pike; Daniel Romanchuk; Brian Siemann
Marathon T54	T52; T53; T54	1:35:00	2	Great Britain (GBR)	JohnBoy Smith; David Weir
Marathon T54	T52; T53; T54	1:35:00	1	Canada (CAN)	Brent Lakatos
Marathon T54	T52; T53; T54	1:35:00	1	China (CHN)	Dai Yunqiang
Marathon T54	T52; T53; T54	1:35:00	1	Ireland (IRL)	Patrick Monahan
Marathon T54	T52; T53; T54	1:35:00	1	Japan (JPN)	Tomoki Suzuki
Marathon T54	T52; T53; T54	1:35:00	1	RPC (RPC)	Vitalii Gritsenko
Marathon T54	T52; T53; T54	1:35:00	1	South Korea (KOR)	Yoo Byunghoon
Marathon T54	T52; T53; T54	1:35:00	1	Switzerland (SUI)	Marcel Hug
Total			16		

=== Men's field ===
==== Long jump ====
Event	Class(es)	Minimum Entry Standard (MES)	No. of athletes	NPC	Qualified athletes
Long jump T11	T11	5.30m	1	Brazil (BRA)	Ricardo Costa de Oliveira
Long jump T11	T11	5.30m	1	China (CHN)	Di Dongdong
Long jump T11	T11	5.30m	1	Chinese Taipei (TPE)	Yang Chuan-Hui
Long jump T11	T11	5.30m	1	France (FRA)	Ronan Pallier
Long jump T11	T11	5.30m	1	Spain (ESP)	Xavier Porras
Long jump T11	T11	5.30m	1	United States (USA)	Lex Gillette
Total			6		
Long jump T12	T12	6.00m	2	Azerbaijan (AZE)	Kamil Aliyev; Said Najafzade
Long jump T12	T12	6.00m	2	Cuba (CUB)	Angel Jimenez Cabeza; Leinier Savon Pineda
Long jump T12	T12	6.00m	2	Sweden (SWE)	Tobias Jonsson; Olof Ryberg
Long jump T12	T12	6.00m	1	Belarus (BLR)	Siarhei Burdukou
Long jump T12	T12	6.00m	1	Germany (GER)	Marcel Böttger
Long jump T12	T12	6.00m	1	Iran (IRI)	Amir Khosravani
Long jump T12	T12	6.00m	1	Uzbekistan (UZB)	Doniyor Saliev
Total			10		
Long jump T13	T13	5.50m	1	Azerbaijan (AZE)	Orkhan Aslanov
Long jump T13	T13	5.50m	1	Burkina Faso (BUR)	Ferdinand Compaore
Long jump T13	T13	5.50m	1	Great Britain (GBR)	Zak Skinner
Long jump T13	T13	5.50m	1	Malaysia (MAS)	Wong Kar Gee
Long jump T13	T13	5.50m	1	Mexico (MEX)	Jorge Benjamin Gonzalez Sauceda
Long jump T13	T13	5.50m	1	Mozambique (MOZ)	Hilario Chavela
Long jump T13	T13	5.50m	1	Spain (ESP)	Iván José Cano Blanco
Long jump T13	T13	5.50m	1	United States (USA)	Isaac Jean-Paul
Total			8		
Long jump T20	T20	6.00m	2	Ecuador (ECU)	Damian Josue Carcelen Delgado; Roberto Carlos Chala Espinoza
Long jump T20	T20	6.00m	1	Australia (AUS)	Nicholas Hum
Long jump T20	T20	6.00m	1	Brazil (BRA)	Gustavo Henrique de Oliveira Dias
Long jump T20	T20	6.00m	1	Croatia (CRO)	Zoran Talic
Long jump T20	T20	6.00m	1	Greece (GRE)	Athanasios Prodromou
Long jump T20	T20	6.00m	1	Hong Kong (HKG)	Nikki Tang
Long jump T20	T20	6.00m	1	Japan (JPN)	Kanta Kokubo
Long jump T20	T20	6.00m	1	Malaysia (MAS)	Abdul Latif Romly
Long jump T20	T20	6.00m	1	Mauritius (MRI)	Eddy Capdor
Long jump T20	T20	6.00m	1	Netherlands (NED)	Ranki Oberoi
Long jump T20	T20	6.00m	1	Saudi Arabia (KSA)	Hassan Dawshi
Total			12		
Long jump T36	T36	4.00m	2	Brazil (BRA)	Aser Mateus Almeida Ramos; Rodrigo Parreira da Silva
Long jump T36	T36	4.00m	2	Ukraine (UKR)	Oleksandr Lytvynenko; Roman Pavlyk
Long jump T36	T36	4.00m	1	China (CHN)	Yang Yifei
Long jump T36	T36	4.00m	1	Colombia (COL)	Omar Acosta
Long jump T36	T36	4.00m	1	New Zealand (NZL)	William Stedman
Long jump T36	T36	4.00m	1	Oman (OMA)	Taha Al-Harrasi
Long jump T36	T36	4.00m	1	RPC (RPC)	Evgenii Torsunov
Long jump T36	T36	4.00m	1	Uzbekistan (UZB)	Izzat Turgunov
Total			10		
Long jump T37	T37	5.00m	2	RPC (RUS)	Sergei Biriukov; Chermen Kobesov
Long jump T37	T37	5.00m	1	Argentina (ARG)	Brian Lionel Impellizzeri
Long jump T37	T37	5.00m	1	Brazil (BRA)	Mateus Evangelista Cardoso
Long jump T37	T37	5.00m	1	France (FRA)	Valentin Bertrand
Long jump T37	T37	5.00m	1	Greece (GRE)	Konstantinos Kamaras
Long jump T37	T37	5.00m	1	Poland (POL)	Mateusz Owczarek
Long jump T37	T37	5.00m	1	Ukraine (UKR)	Vladyslav Zahrebelnyi
Total			8		
Long jump T38	T38	4.70m	3	China (CHN)	Zhong Huanghao; Zhou Peng; Zhu Dening
Long jump T38	T38	4.70m	2	Colombia (COL)	Juan Gómez Coa; José Lemos
Long jump T38	T38	4.70m	2	RPC (RPC)	David Budoian; Khetag Khinchagov
Long jump T38	T38	4.70m	1	Australia (AUS)	Ari Gesini
Long jump T38	T38	4.70m	1	Georgia (GEO)	Davit Kavtaradze
Long jump T38	T38	4.70m	1	South Africa (RSA)	Dyan Buis
Long jump T38	T38	4.70m	1	Tunisia (TUN)	Mohamed Farhat Chida
Long jump T38	T38	4.70m	1	Ukraine (UKR)	Mykyta Senyk
Total			12		
Long jump T47	T45; T46; T47	6.10m	3	United States (USA)	Tobi Fawehinmi; Roderick Townsend-Roberts; Dallas Wise
Long jump T47	T45; T46; T47	6.10m	2	China (CHN)	Chen Hongjie; Wang Hao
Long jump T47	T45; T46; T47	6.10m	1	Brazil (BRA)	Michel Gustavo Abraham de Deus
Long jump T47	T45; T46; T47	6.10m	1	Cuba (CUB)	Robiel Yankiel Sol Cervantes
Long jump T47	T45; T46; T47	6.10m	1	France (FRA)	Arnaud Assoumani
Long jump T47	T45; T46; T47	6.10m	1	Indonesia (INA)	Setiyo Budihartanto
Long jump T47	T45; T46; T47	6.10m	1	RPC (RPC)	Nikita Kotukov
Long jump T47	T45; T46; T47	6.10m	1	Serbia (SRB)	Nemanja Matijasevic
Long jump T47	T45; T46; T47	6.10m	1	Sierra Leone (SLE)	Sorie Karbgo
Total			12		
Long jump T63	T42; T61; T63	4.40m	2	Germany (GER)	Ali Lacin; Leon Schaefer
Long jump T63	T42; T61; T63	4.40m	2	Japan (JPN)	Junta Kosuda; Atsushi Yamamoto
Long jump T63	T42; T61; T63	4.40m	2	South Africa (RSA)	Puseletso Michael Mabote; Ntando Mahlangu
Long jump T63	T42; T61; T63	4.40m	2	United States (USA)	Ezra Frech; Regas Woods Sr
Long jump T63	T42; T61; T63	4.40m	1	Denmark (DEN)	Daniel Wagner
Long jump T63	T42; T61; T63	4.40m	1	Netherlands (NED)	Joël de Jong
Total			10		
Long jump T64	T44; T62; T64	5.50m	1	France (FRA)	Dimitri Pavadé
Long jump T64	T44; T62; T64	5.50m	1	Germany (GER)	Markus Rehm
Long jump T64	T44; T62; T64	5.50m	1	Greece (GRE)	Stylianos Malakopoulos
Long jump T64	T44; T62; T64	5.50m	1	Italy (ITA)	Marco Cicchetti
Long jump T64	T44; T62; T64	5.50m	1	South Africa (RSA)	Mpumelelo Mhlongo
Long jump T64	T44; T62; T64	5.50m	1	United States (USA)	Trenten Merrill
Total			6		

==== High jump ====
Event	Class(es)	Minimum Entry Standard (MES)	No. of athletes	NPC	Qualified athletes
High jump T47	T45; T46; T47	1.50m	2	India (IND)	Nishad Kumar; Ram Pal
High jump T47	T45; T46; T47	1.50m	2	United States (USA)	Roderick Townsend-Roberts; Dallas Wise
High jump T47	T45; T46; T47	1.50m	1	Brazil (BRA)	Paulo Guerra
High jump T47	T45; T46; T47	1.50m	1	China (CHN)	Chen Hongjie
High jump T47	T45; T46; T47	1.50m	1	Ireland (IRL)	Jordan Lee
High jump T47	T45; T46; T47	1.50m	1	RPC (RPC)	Georgii Margiev
High jump T47	T45; T46; T47	1.50m	1	Thailand (THA)	Angkarn Chanaboon
Total			9		
High jump T63	T42; T64	1.50m	3	India (IND)	Varun Singh Bhati; Sharad Kumar; Mariyappan Thangavelu
High jump T63	T42; T64	1.50m	2	United States (USA)	Ezra Frech; Sam Grewe
High jump T63	T42; T64	1.50m	1	Brazil (BRA)	Flavio Reitz
High jump T63	T42; T64	1.50m	1	Egypt (EGY)	Hamada Hassan
High jump T63	T42; T64	1.50m	1	Ghana (GHA)	Yusif Amadu
High jump T63	T42; T64	1.50m	1	Poland (POL)	Łukasz Mamczarz
Total			9		
High jump T64	T44; T64	1.40m	1	Brazil (BRA)	Jeohsah Beserra dos Santos
High jump T64	T44; T64	1.40m	1	Great Britain (GBR)	Jonathan Broom-Edwards
High jump T64	T44; T64	1.40m	1	India (IND)	Praveen Kumar
High jump T64	T44; T64	1.40m	1	Japan (JPN)	Toru Suzuki
High jump T64	T44; T64	1.40m	1	Poland (POL)	Maciej Lepiato
High jump T64	T44; T64	1.40m	1	Uzbekistan (UZB)	Temurbek Giyazov
High jump T64	T44; T64	1.40m	1	Venezuela (VEN)	Rafael Augusto Uribe Pimentel
Total			7		

==== Club throw ====
Event	Class(es)	Minimum Entry Standard (MES)	No. of athletes	NPC	Qualified athletes
Club throw F32	F31; F32	22.00m	3	Algeria (ALG)	Lahouari Bahlaz; Walid Ferhah; Ahmed Mehideb
Club throw F32	F31; F32	22.00m	1	China (CHN)	Liu Li
Club throw F32	F31; F32	22.00m	1	Czech Republic (CZE)	Frantisek Serbus
Club throw F32	F31; F32	22.00m	1	Greece (GRE)	Athanasios Konstantinidis
Club throw F32	F31; F32	22.00m	1	Oman (OMA)	Mohammed Al Mashaykhi
Club throw F32	F31; F32	22.00m	1	Poland (POL)	Maciej Sochal
Club throw F32	F31; F32	22.00m	1	RPC (RPC)	Aleksei Churkin
Club throw F32	F31; F32	22.00m	1	Tunisia (TUN)	Abdennacer Feidi
Total			10		
Club throw F51	F51	17.00m	2	India (IND)	Amit Kumar Saroha; Dharambir Nain
Club throw F51	F51	17.00m	1	Belarus (BLR)	Uladzislau Hryb
Club throw F51	F51	17.00m	1	Czech Republic (CZE)	Michal Enge
Club throw F51	F51	17.00m	1	Mexico (MEX)	Mario Santana Ramos Hernandez
Club throw F51	F51	17.00m	1	RPC (RPC)	Musa Taimazov
Club throw F51	F51	17.00m	1	Serbia (SRB)	Zeljko Dimitrijevic
Club throw F51	F51	17.00m	1	Slovakia (SVK)	Marian Kureja
Total			8		

==== Discus throw ====
Event	Class(es)	Minimum Entry Standard (MES)	No. of athletes	NPC	Qualified athletes
Discus throw F11	F11	29.00m	2	Iran (IRI)	Nourmohammad Arekhi; Mahdi Olad
Discus throw F11	F11	29.00m	2	RPC (RPC)	Igor Baskakov; Sergei Shatalov
Discus throw F11	F11	29.00m	1	Austria (AUT)	Bil Marinkovic
Discus throw F11	F11	29.00m	1	Brazil (BRA)	Alessandro Rodrigo Da Silva
Discus throw F11	F11	29.00m	1	Italy (ITA)	Oney Tapia
Discus throw F11	F11	29.00m	1	Poland (POL)	Mirosław Madzia
Discus throw F11	F11	29.00m	1	Spain (ESP)	Alvaro del Amo Cano
Total			9		
Discus throw F37	F37	39.00m	1	Australia (AUS)	Guy Henly
Discus throw F37	F37	39.00m	1	Brazil (BRA)	Joao Victor Teixeira de Souza Silva
Discus throw F37	F37	39.00m	1	Egypt (EGY)	Mohamed Ramadan
Discus throw F37	F37	39.00m	1	Lithuania (LTU)	Donatas Dundzys
Discus throw F37	F37	39.00m	1	Pakistan (PAK)	Haider Ali
Discus throw F37	F37	39.00m	1	Refugee Paralympic Team (RPT)	Shahrad Nasajpour
Discus throw F37	F37	39.00m	1	Ukraine (UKR)	Mykola Zhabnyak
Discus throw F37	F37	39.00m	1	Venezuela (VEN)	Edwars Alexander Varela Mesa
Total			8		
Discus throw F52	F51; F52	10.00m	3	Poland (POL)	Robert Jachimowicz; Piotr Kosewicz; Rafal Rocki
Discus throw F52	F51; F52	10.00m	1	Algeria (ALG)	Mohamed Berrahal
Discus throw F52	F51; F52	10.00m	1	Croatia (CRO)	Velimir Sandor
Discus throw F52	F51; F52	10.00m	1	India (IND)	Vinod Kumar
Discus throw F52	F51; F52	10.00m	1	Latvia (LAT)	Aigars Apinis
Discus throw F52	F51; F52	10.00m	1	Slovenia (SLO)	Henrik Plank
Total			8		
Discus throw F56	F54; F55; F56	33.00m	1	Azerbaijan (AZE)	Olokhan Musayev
Discus throw F56	F54; F55; F56	33.00m	1	Brazil (BRA)	Claudiney Batista dos Santos
Discus throw F56	F54; F55; F56	33.00m	1	Cuba (CUB)	Leonardo Diaz Aldana
Discus throw F56	F54; F55; F56	33.00m	1	Greece (GRE)	Konstantinos Tzounis
Discus throw F56	F54; F55; F56	33.00m	1	India (IND)	Yogesh Kathuniya
Discus throw F56	F54; F55; F56	33.00m	1	Serbia (SRB)	Nebojsa Duric
Discus throw F56	F54; F55; F56	33.00m	1	Slovakia (SVK)	Dušan Laczkó
Discus throw F56	F54; F55; F56	33.00m	1	Tanzania (TAN)	Ignas Madumla Mtweve
Total			8		
Discus throw F64	F43; F44; F62; F64	40.00m	2	Great Britain (GBR)	Dan Greaves; Harrison Walsh
Discus throw F64	F43; F44; F62; F64	40.00m	2	United States (USA)	David Blair; Jeremy Campbell
Discus throw F64	F43; F44; F62; F64	40.00m	1	Croatia (CRO)	Ivan Katanušić
Discus throw F64	F43; F44; F62; F64	40.00m	1	Estonia (EST)	Egert Joẽsaar
Discus throw F64	F43; F44; F62; F64	40.00m	1	Slovakia (SVK)	Adrian Matusik
Total			7		

==== Javelin throw ====
Event	Class(es)	Minimum Entry Standard (MES)	No. of athletes	NPC	Qualified athletes
Javelin throw F13	F12; F13	43.00m	1	Azerbaijan (AZE)	Orkhan Gasimov
Javelin throw F13	F12; F13	43.00m	1	Cuba (CUB)	Uliser Aguilera Cruz
Javelin throw F13	F12; F13	43.00m	1	Great Britain (GBR)	Dan Pembroke
Javelin throw F13	F12; F13	43.00m	1	Iran (IRI)	Ali Pirouj
Javelin throw F13	F12; F13	43.00m	1	Poland (POL)	Marek Wietecki
Javelin throw F13	F12; F13	43.00m	1	Romania (ROU)	Octavian Vasile Tucaliuc
Javelin throw F13	F12; F13	43.00m	1	Spain (ESP)	Hector Cabrera Llacer
Total			7		
Javelin throw F34	F33; F34	19.00m	2	China (CHN)	Wang Yanzhang; Zhang Zhongqiang
Javelin throw F34	F33; F34	19.00m	2	Colombia (COL)	Diego Meneses; Mauricio Valencia
Javelin throw F34	F33; F34	19.00m	1	France (FRA)	Thierry Cibone
Javelin throw F34	F33; F34	19.00m	1	Iran (IRI)	Saeid Afrooz
Javelin throw F34	F33; F34	19.00m	1	Iraq (IRQ)	Hussein Khafaji
Javelin throw F34	F33; F34	19.00m	1	Morocco (MAR)	Azeddine Nouiri
Javelin throw F34	F33; F34	19.00m	1	Papua New Guinea (PNG)	Morea Mararos
Javelin throw F34	F33; F34	19.00m	1	Tunisia (TUN)	Faouzi Rzig
Total			10		
Javelin throw F38	F38	30.00m	2	Australia (AUS)	Corey Anderson; Jayden Sawyer
Javelin throw F38	F38	30.00m	2	Colombia (COL)	José Lemos; Luis Fernando Lucumí Villegas
Javelin throw F38	F38	30.00m	2	Ukraine (UKR)	Vladyslav Bilyi; Oleksandr Doroshenko
Javelin throw F38	F38	30.00m	1	Bahrain (BRN)	Ahmed Meshaima
Javelin throw F38	F38	30.00m	1	South Africa (RSA)	Reinhardt Hamman
Total			8		
Javelin throw F41	F40; F41	27.00m	3	Iraq (IRQ)	Kovan Abdulraheem; Ahmed Naas; Wildan Nukhailawi
Javelin throw F41	F40; F41	27.00m	1	China (CHN)	Sun Pengxiang
Javelin throw F41	F40; F41	27.00m	1	Croatia (CRO)	Vladimir Gaspar
Javelin throw F41	F40; F41	27.00m	1	Fiji (FIJ)	Iosefo Rakesa
Javelin throw F41	F40; F41	27.00m	1	India (IND)	Navdeep Singh
Javelin throw F41	F40; F41	27.00m	1	Iran (IRI)	Sadegh Beit Sayah
Javelin throw F41	F40; F41	27.00m	1	Ivory Coast (CIV)	Kah Michel Ye
Total			9		
Javelin throw F46	F45; F46	39.00m	3	India (IND)	Sundar Singh Gurjar; Ajeet Singh; Devendra Jhajharia
Javelin throw F46	F45; F46	39.00m	2	Japan (JPN)	Takuya Shiramasa; Akihiro Yamazaki
Javelin throw F46	F45; F46	39.00m	1	Cuba (CUB)	Guillermo Varona Gonzalez
Javelin throw F46	F45; F46	39.00m	1	Lithuania (LTU)	Andrius Skuja
Javelin throw F46	F45; F46	39.00m	1	Mexico (MEX)	Eliezer Gabriel Buenaventura
Javelin throw F46	F45; F46	39.00m	1	Sri Lanka (SRI)	Dinesh P. Herath Mudiyanselage
Total			9		
Javelin throw F54	F53; F54	19.70m	1	Greece (GRE)	Manolis Stefanoudakis
Javelin throw F54	F53; F54	19.70m	1	Iran (IRI)	Hamed Amiri
Javelin throw F54	F53; F54	19.70m	1	Mexico (MEX)	Edgar Ulises Fuentes Yanez
Javelin throw F54	F53; F54	19.70m	1	RPC (RUS)	Aleksei Kuznetsov
Javelin throw F54	F53; F54	19.70m	1	Slovakia (SVK)	Ladislav Cuchran
Javelin throw F54	F53; F54	19.70m	1	United States (USA)	Justin Phongsavanh
Total			6		
Javelin throw F57	F56; F57	31.00m	1	Argentina (ARG)	Pablo Damian Gimenez Reinoso
Javelin throw F57	F56; F57	31.00m	1	Azerbaijan (AZE)	Hamed Heidari
Javelin throw F57	F56; F57	31.00m	1	Brazil (BRA)	Cicero Valdiran Lins Nobre
Javelin throw F57	F56; F57	31.00m	1	Cape Verde (CPV)	Marilson Fernandes Semedo
Javelin throw F57	F56; F57	31.00m	1	Iran (IRI)	Amanolah Papi
Javelin throw F57	F56; F57	31.00m	1	India (IND)	Ranjeet Bhati
Javelin throw F57	F56; F57	31.00m	1	Liberia (LBR)	Thomas Mulbah
Javelin throw F57	F56; F57	31.00m	1	Mexico (MEX)	Edgar Ismael Barajas
Javelin throw F57	F56; F57	31.00m	1	Senegal (SEN)	Youssoupha Diouf
Javelin throw F57	F56; F57	31.00m	1	Syria (SYR)	Mohamad Mohamad
Javelin throw F57	F56; F57	31.00m	1	Uzbekistan (UZB)	Yorkinbek Odilov
Javelin throw F57	F56; F57	31.00m	1	Vietnam (VIE)	Cao Ngoc Hung
Total			12		
Javelin throw F64	F42; F43; F44; F61; F62; F63; F64	44.00m	2	Brazil (BRA)	Francisco Jefferson de Lima; Edenilson Roberto Floriani
Javelin throw F64	F42; F43; F44; F61; F62; F63; F64	44.00m	2	India (IND)	Sandeep Chaudhary; Sumit Antil
Javelin throw F64	F42; F43; F44; F61; F62; F63; F64	44.00m	2	Sri Lanka (SRI)	Chaminda Sampath Hetti Arachchige; Dulan Kodithuwakku
Javelin throw F64	F42; F43; F44; F61; F62; F63; F64	44.00m	1	Australia (AUS)	Michal Burian
Javelin throw F64	F42; F43; F44; F61; F62; F63; F64	44.00m	1	Fiji (FIJ)	Inosi Matea Bulimairewa
Javelin throw F64	F42; F43; F44; F61; F62; F63; F64	44.00m	1	Ukraine (UKR)	Roman Novak
Javelin throw F64	F42; F43; F44; F61; F62; F63; F64	44.00m	1	United States (USA)	Mike Gallardo
Total			10		

==== Shot put ====
Event	Class(es)	Minimum Entry Standard (MES)	No. of athletes	NPC	Qualified athletes
Shot put F11	F11	7.50m	2	Iran (IRI)	Nourmohammad Arekhi; Mahdi Olad
Shot put F11	F11	7.50m	2	RPC (RPC)	Igor Baskakov; Sergei Shatalov
Shot put F11	F11	7.50m	1	Brazil (BRA)	Alessandro Rodrigo Da Silva
Shot put F11	F11	7.50m	1	Croatia (CRO)	Miljenko Vucic
Shot put F11	F11	7.50m	1	Guatemala (GUA)	Isaac Leiva Avila
Shot put F11	F11	7.50m	1	Italy (ITA)	Oney Tapia
Shot put F11	F11	7.50m	1	Montenegro (MNE)	Milos Spaic
Shot put F11	F11	7.50m	1	Poland (POL)	Mirosław Madzia
Shot put F11	F11	7.50m	1	Spain (ESP)	Alvaro del Amo Cano
Total			11		
Shot put F12	F12	11.50m	2	Spain (ESP)	Hector Cabrera Llacer; Kim Lopez Gonzalez
Shot put F12	F12	11.50m	2	Ukraine (UKR)	Roman Danyliuk; Volodymyr Ponomerenko
Shot put F12	F12	11.50m	1	Iran (IRI)	Saman Pakbaz
Shot put F12	F12	11.50m	1	Moldova (MDA)	Vladimir Butcea
Shot put F12	F12	11.50m	1	Poland (POL)	Marek Wietecki
Shot put F12	F12	11.50m	1	Uzbekistan (UZB)	Elbek Sultonov
Total			8		
Shot put F20	F20	11.00m	2	Greece (GRE)	Efstratios Nikolaidis; Leontis Stefanidis
Shot put F20	F20	11.00m	2	Ukraine (UKR)	Maksym Koval; Oleksandr Yarovyi
Shot put F20	F20	11.00m	1	Australia (AUS)	Todd Hodgetts
Shot put F20	F20	11.00m	1	Ecuador (ECU)	Jordi Patricio Congo Villalba
Shot put F20	F20	11.00m	1	Hungary (HUN)	Istvan Szollosi
Shot put F20	F20	11.00m	1	Malaysia (MAS)	Muhammad Ziyad Zolkefli
Shot put F20	F20	11.00m	1	RPC (RUS)	Alexander Alexandrov
Total			9		
Shot put F32	F32	6.50m	3	Algeria (ALG)	Mohamed Nadjib Amchi; Lahouari Bahlaz; Ahmed Mehideb
Shot put F32	F32	6.50m	1	China (CHN)	Liu Li
Shot put F32	F32	6.50m	1	Greece (GRE)	Athanasios Konstantinidis
Shot put F32	F32	6.50m	1	Oman (OMA)	Mohammed Al-Mashaykhi
Shot put F32	F32	6.50m	1	Poland (POL)	Maciej Sochal
Shot put F32	F32	6.50m	1	RPC (RPC)	Aleksei Churkin
Shot put F32	F32	6.50m	1	Tunisia (TUN)	Abdennacer Feidi
Total			9		
Shot put F33	F33	6.50m	1	Algeria (ALG)	Kamel Kardjena
Shot put F33	F33	6.50m	1	Croatia (CRO)	Deni Černi
Shot put F33	F33	6.50m	1	Germany (GER)	Daniel Scheil
Shot put F33	F33	6.50m	1	Greece (GRE)	Lazaros Stefanidis
Shot put F33	F33	6.50m	1	Morocco (MAR)	Zakariae Derhem
Shot put F33	F33	6.50m	1	Poland (POL)	Michal Glab
Shot put F33	F33	6.50m	1	RPC (RPC)	Aleksandr Khrupin
Total			7		
Shot put F34	F34	7.70m	1	China (CHN)	Wang Yanzhang
Shot put F34	F34	7.70m	1	Colombia (COL)	Mauricio Valencia
Shot put F34	F34	7.70m	1	France (FRA)	Thierry Cibone
Shot put F34	F34	7.70m	1	Iran (IRI)	Siamak Saleh Farajzadeh
Shot put F34	F34	7.70m	1	Israel (ISR)	Oleksandr Aliekseienko
Shot put F34	F34	7.70m	1	Jordan (JOR)	Ahmad Hindi
Shot put F34	F34	7.70m	1	Kyrgyzstan (KGZ)	Arystanbek Bazarkulov
Shot put F34	F34	7.70m	1	Morocco (MAR)	Azeddine Nouiri
Shot put F34	F34	7.70m	1	Poland (POL)	Tomasz Paulinski
Shot put F34	F34	7.70m	1	Qatar (QAT)	Abdulrahman Fiqi
Total			10		
Shot put F35	F35	9.00m	1	Argentina (ARG)	Hernan Emanuel Urra
Shot put F35	F35	9.00m	1	China (CHN)	Fu Xinhan
Shot put F35	F35	9.00m	1	India (IND)	Arvind Malik
Shot put F35	F35	9.00m	1	Iran (IRI)	Seyed Javanmardi
Shot put F35	F35	9.00m	1	Italy (ITA)	Nicky Russo
Shot put F35	F35	9.00m	1	Latvia (LAT)	Edgars Bergs
Shot put F35	F35	9.00m	1	RPC (RPC)	Alexander Elmin
Shot put F35	F35	9.00m	1	Uzbekistan (UZB)	Khusniddin Norbekov
Total			8		
Shot put F36	F36	9.00m	2	RPC (RPC)	Alan Kokoity; Vladimir Sviridov
Shot put F36	F36	9.00m	1	Germany (GER)	Sebastian Dietz
Shot put F36	F36	9.00m	1	Kazakhstan (KAZ)	Dastan Mukashbekov
Shot put F36	F36	9.00m	1	Mexico (MEX)	Jose Roman Ruiz Castro
Shot put F36	F36	9.00m	1	Tunisia (TUN)	Yassine Guenichi
Total			6		
Shot put F37	F37	11.00m	2	Brazil (BRA)	Emanoel Victor Souza de Oliveira; Joao Victor Teixeira de Sousa Silva
Shot put F37	F37	11.00m	1	Lithuania (LTU)	Donatas Dundzys
Shot put F37	F37	11.00m	1	Mexico (MEX)	Bryan Leonel Enrique Gonzalez
Shot put F37	F37	11.00m	1	New Zealand (NZL)	Ben Tuimaseve
Shot put F37	F37	11.00m	1	Poland (POL)	Tomasz Sciubak
Shot put F37	F37	11.00m	1	RPC (RPC)	Albert Khinchagov
Shot put F37	F37	11.00m	1	Refugee Paralympic Team (RPT)	Shahrad Nasajpour
Shot put F37	F37	11.00m	1	Tunisia (TUN)	Ahmed Ben Moslah
Shot put F37	F37	11.00m	1	Ukraine (UKR)	Mykola Zhabnyak
Total			10		
Shot put F40	F40	6.00m	2	RPC (RPC)	Dmitry Dushkin; Denis Gnezdilov
Shot put F40	F40	6.00m	1	Bhutan (BHU)	Gyeltshen Gyeltshen
Shot put F40	F40	6.00m	1	Croatia (CRO)	Matija Sloup
Shot put F40	F40	6.00m	1	Germany (GER)	Yannis Fischer
Shot put F40	F40	6.00m	1	Iraq (IRQ)	Garrah Tnaiash
Shot put F40	F40	6.00m	1	Netherlands (NED)	Take Zonneveld
Shot put F40	F40	6.00m	1	Portugal (POR)	Miguel Monteiro
Shot put F40	F40	6.00m	1	Singapore (SGP)	Muhammad Diroy Noordin
Total			9		
Shot put F41	F41	8.70m	1	China (CHN)	Sun Pengxiang
Shot put F41	F41	8.70m	1	Fiji (FIJ)	Iosefo Rakesa
Shot put F41	F41	8.70m	1	Germany (GER)	Niko Kappel
Shot put F41	F41	8.70m	1	Great Britain (GBR)	Kyron Duke
Shot put F41	F41	8.70m	1	Ivory Coast (CIV)	Kah Michel Ye
Shot put F41	F41	8.70m	1	Poland (POL)	Bartosz Tyszkowski
Shot put F41	F41	8.70m	1	United States (USA)	Hagan Landry
Shot put F41	F41	8.70m	1	Uzbekistan (UZB)	Bobirjon Omonov
Total			4		
Shot put F46	F45; F46	11.00m	1	Canada (CAN)	Greg Stewart
Shot put F46	F45; F46	11.00m	1	China (CHN)	Wei Enlong
Shot put F46	F45; F46	11.00m	1	Germany (GER)	Matthias Uwe Schulze
Shot put F46	F45; F46	11.00m	1	Lithuania (LTU)	Andrius Skuja
Shot put F46	F45; F46	11.00m	1	RPC (RPC)	Nikita Prokhorov
Shot put F46	F45; F46	11.00m	1	South Africa (RSA)	Kerwin Noemdo
Shot put F46	F45; F46	11.00m	1	United States (USA)	Joshua Cinnamo
Shot put F46	F45; F46	11.00m	1	Venezuela (VEN)	Abrahan Jesus Ortega Abello
Total			8		
Shot put F53	F53	5.00m	1	Azerbaijan (AZE)	Elvin Astanov
Shot put F53	F53	5.00m	1	Croatia (CRO)	Marijan Presecan
Shot put F53	F53	5.00m	1	Czech Republic (CZE)	Ales Kisy
Shot put F53	F53	5.00m	1	Greece (GRE)	Che Jon Fernandes
Shot put F53	F53	5.00m	1	Iran (IRI)	Alireza Mokhtari
Shot put F53	F53	5.00m	1	Mexico (MEX)	Erick Ortiz Monroy
Shot put F53	F53	5.00m	1	Palestine (PLE)	Husam Azzam
Shot put F53	F53	5.00m	1	Poland (POL)	Bartosz Gorczak
Shot put F53	F53	5.00m	1	United States (USA)	Scot Severn
Total			9		
Shot put F55	F54; F55	9.50m	1	Azerbaijan (AZE)	Olokhan Musayev
Shot put F55	F54; F55	9.50m	1	Bosnia and Herzegovina (BIH)	Dzevad Pandzic
Shot put F55	F54; F55	9.50m	1	Brazil (BRA)	Wallace Santos
Shot put F55	F54; F55	9.50m	1	Bulgaria (BUL)	Ruzhdi Ruzhdi
Shot put F55	F54; F55	9.50m	1	India (IND)	Tek Chand
Shot put F55	F54; F55	9.50m	1	Poland (POL)	Lech Stoltman
Shot put F55	F54; F55	9.50m	1	RPC (RPC)	Sergei Sokulskii
Shot put F55	F54; F55	9.50m	1	Serbia (SRB)	Nebojsa Duric
Total			8		
Shot put F57	F56; F57	11.00m	2	Brazil (BRA)	Marco Aurélio Borges; Thiago Paulino dos Santos
Shot put F57	F56; F57	11.00m	1	Argentina (ARG)	Pablo Damian Gimenez Reinoso
Shot put F57	F56; F57	11.00m	1	Azerbaijan (AZE)	Samir Nabiyev
Shot put F57	F56; F57	11.00m	1	China (CHN)	Wu Guoshan
Shot put F57	F56; F57	11.00m	1	Democratic Republic of the Congo (COD)	Paulin Mayombo Mukendi
Shot put F57	F56; F57	11.00m	1	Haiti (HAI)	Ywenson Registre
Shot put F57	F56; F57	11.00m	1	India (IND)	Soman Rana
Shot put F57	F56; F57	11.00m	1	Libya (LBA)	Mahmoud Rajab
Shot put F57	F56; F57	11.00m	1	Mexico (MEX)	Edgar Ismael Barajas
Shot put F57	F56; F57	11.00m	1	Poland (POL)	Janusz Rokicki
Shot put F57	F56; F57	11.00m	1	Somalia (SOM)	Mahdi Abshir Omar
Shot put F57	F56; F57	11.00m	1	Syria (SYR)	Mohamad Mohamad
Shot put F57	F56; F57	11.00m	1	Uzbekistan (UZB)	Yorkinbek Odilov
Shot put F57	F56; F57	11.00m	1	Yemen (YEM)	Naseb Fateh Mohammed Alraoad
Total			15		
Shot put F63	F42; F61; F63	11.20m	1	Brazil (BRA)	Edenilson Roberto Floriani
Shot put F63	F42; F61; F63	11.20m	1	Great Britain (GBR)	Aled Davies
Shot put F63	F42; F61; F63	11.20m	1	Iran (IRI)	Sajad Mohammadian
Shot put F63	F42; F61; F63	11.20m	1	Kuwait (KUW)	Faisal Sorour
Shot put F63	F42; F61; F63	11.20m	1	Luxembourg (LUX)	Tom Habscheid
Shot put F63	F42; F61; F63	11.20m	1	South Africa (RSA)	Tyrone Pillay
Shot put F63	F42; F61; F63	11.20m	1	Sri Lanka (SRI)	Palitha Halgahawela
Shot put F63	F42; F61; F63	11.20m	1	Tajikistan (TJK)	Akmal Qodirov
Shot put F63	F42; F61; F63	11.20m	1	Uzbekistan (UZB)	Mukhammad Rikhsimov
Total			9		

=== Women's track ===
==== 100 metres ====
Event	Class(es)	Minimum Entry Standard (MES)	No. of athletes	NPC	Qualified athletes
100m T11	T11	14.50	2	Brazil (BRA)	Jerusa Geber dos Santos; Lorena Salvatini Spoladore
100m T11	T11	14.50	2	China (CHN)	Liu Cuiqing; Zhou Guohua
100m T11	T11	14.50	1	Cameroon (CMR)	Judith Mariette Lebog
Total			5		
100m T12	T12	14.30	1	Algeria (ALG)	Lynda Hamri
100m T12	T12	14.30	1	Brazil (BRA)	Viviane Ferreira Soares
100m T12	T12	14.30	1	Cuba (CUB)	Omara Durand
100m T12	T12	14.30	1	Germany (GER)	Katrin Mueller-Rottgardt
100m T12	T12	14.30	1	Paraguay (PAR)	Melissa Nair Tillner Galeano
100m T12	T12	14.30	1	Spain (ESP)	Adiaratou Iglesias Forneiro
Total			6		
100m T13	T13	15.00	2	United States (USA)	Kym Crosby; Taylor Talbot
100m T13	T13	15.00	1	Brazil (BRA)	Rayane Soares Da Silva
100m T13	T13	15.00	1	Germany (GER)	Janne Sophie Engeleiter
100m T13	T13	15.00	1	India (IND)	Simran Yadav
100m T13	T13	15.00	1	South Africa (RSA)	Johanna Pretorius
100m T13	T13	15.00	1	Ukraine (UKR)	Leilia Adzhametova
Total			7		
100m T34	T33; T34	25.00	3	Great Britain (GBR)	Kare Adenegan; Fabienne André; Hannah Cockroft
100m T34	T33; T34	25.00	2	United States (USA)	Alexa Halko; Eva Houston
100m T34	T33; T34	25.00	1	Netherlands (NED)	Amy Siemons
Total			6		
100m T35	T35	20.50	1	Great Britain (GBR)	Maria Lyle
100m T35	T35	20.50	1	Iraq (IRQ)	Fatimah Suwaed
100m T35	T35	20.50	1	Italy (ITA)	Oxana Corso
100m T35	T35	20.50	1	Netherlands (NED)	Nienke Timmer
100m T35	T35	20.50	1	Poland (POL)	Jagoda Kibil
Total			5		
100m T36	T36	17.30	1	Argentina (ARG)	Yanina Andrea Martinez
100m T36	T36	17.30	1	Brazil (BRA)	Tascitha Oliveira Cruz
100m T36	T36	17.30	1	China (CHN)	Shi Yiting
100m T36	T36	17.30	1	Germany (GER)	Nicole Nicoleitzik
100m T36	T36	17.30	1	New Zealand (NZL)	Danielle Aitchison
Total			4		
100m T37	T37	15.40	2	China (CHN)	Jiang Fenfen; Wen Xiaoyan
100m T37	T37	15.40	1	France (FRA)	Mandy Francois-Elie
100m T37	T37	15.40	1	Germany (GER)	Isabelle Foerder
100m T37	T37	15.40	1	United States (USA)	Jaleen Roberts
Total			5		
100m T38	T38	15.20	3	Great Britain (GBR)	Olivia Breen; Sophie Hahn; Ali Smith
100m T38	T38	15.20	2	Germany (GER)	Lindy Ave; Nele Moos
100m T38	T38	15.20	1	Australia (AUS)	Rhiannon Clarke
100m T38	T38	15.20	1	Hungary (HUN)	Luca Ekler
Total			7		
100m T47	T45; T46; T47	13.60	2	United States (USA)	Brittni Mason; Deja Young
100m T47	T45; T46; T47	13.60	1	Germany (GER)	Lise Petersen
100m T47	T45; T46; T47	13.60	1	South Africa (RSA)	Anrune Weyers
100m T47	T45; T46; T47	13.60	1	Venezuela (VEN)	Lisbeli Marina Vera Andrade
Total			5		
100m T53	T53	20.00	2	China (CHN)	Gao Fang; Zhou Hongzhuan
100m T53	T53	20.00	1	Bermuda (BER)	Jessica Cooper Lewis
100m T53	T53	20.00	1	Great Britain (GBR)	Samantha Kinghorn
100m T53	T53	20.00	1	United States (USA)	Kelsey Le Fevour
Total			5		
100m T54	T54	18.25	2	China (CHN)	Zhou Zhaoqian; Zou Lihong
100m T54	T54	18.25	2	United States (USA)	Jenna Fesemyer; Cheri Madsen
100m T54	T54	18.25	1	Finland (FIN)	Amanda Kotaja
100m T54	T54	18.25	1	Germany (GER)	Merle Menje
Total			6		
100m T63	T42; T63	20.00	1	Belgium (BEL)	Gitte Haenen
100m T63	T42; T63	20.00	1	Indonesia (INA)	Karisma Evi Tiarani
100m T63	T42; T63	20.00	1	Italy (ITA)	Monica Graziana Contrafatto
100m T63	T42; T63	20.00	1	United States (USA)	Noelle Lambert
Total			4		
100m T64	T44; T62; T64	16.00	3	United States (USA)	Femita Ayanbeku; Beatriz Hatz; Noelle Lambert
100m T64	T44; T62; T64	16.00	2	Germany (GER)	Irmgard Bensusan; Maria Tietze
100m T64	T44; T62; T64	16.00	2	Netherlands (NED)	Kimberly Alkemade; Marlene van Gansewinkel
100m T64	T44; T62; T64	16.00	1	Great Britain (GBR)	Sophie Kamlish
Total			7		

==== 200 metres ====
Event	Class(es)	Minimum Entry Standard (MES)	No. of athletes	NPC	Qualified athletes
200m T11	T11	31.00	3	Brazil (BRA)	Jerusa Geber dos Santos; Lorena Salvatini Spoladore; Thalita Vitoria Simplicio Da Silva
200m T11	T11	31.00	1	China (CHN)	Liu Cuiqing
Total			4		
200m T12	T12	30.00	1	Cuba (CUB)	Omara Durand
200m T12	T12	30.00	1	Paraguay (PAR)	Melissa Nair Tillner Galeano
200m T12	T12	30.00	1	RPC (RUS)	Anna Kulinich-Sorolina
200m T12	T12	30.00	1	Spain (ESP)	Adiaratou Iglesias Forneiro
200m T12	T12	30.00	1	Ukraine (UKR)	Oksana Boturchuk
Total			5		
200m T35	T35	42.00	1	Great Britain (GBR)	Maria Lyle
200m T35	T35	42.00	1	Iraq (IRQ)	Fatimah Suwaed
200m T35	T35	42.00	1	Italy (ITA)	Oxana Corso
200m T35	T35	42.00	1	Netherlands (NED)	Nienke Timmer
200m T35	T35	42.00	1	Poland (POL)	Jagoda Kibil
Total			5		
200m T36	T36	37.00	1	Argentina (ARG)	Yanina Andrea Martinez
200m T36	T36	37.00	1	China (CHN)	Shi Yiting
200m T36	T36	37.00	1	Germany (GER)	Nicole Nicoleitzik
200m T36	T36	37.00	1	New Zealand (NZL)	Danielle Aitchison
200m T36	T36	37.00	1	South Korea (KOR)	Jeon Min-jae
Total			4		
200m T37	T37	33.20	2	China (CHN)	Jiang Fenfen; Wen Xiaoyan
200m T37	T37	33.20	1	France (FRA)	Mandy Francois-Elie
200m T37	T37	33.20	1	Germany (GER)	Isabelle Foerder
200m T37	T37	33.20	1	Ukraine (UKR)	Nataliia Kobzar
Total			4		
200m T47	T45; T46; T47	29.00	2	United States (USA)	Brittni Mason; Deja Young
200m T47	T45; T46; T47	29.00	1	South Africa (RSA)	Anrune Weyers
200m T47	T45; T46; T47	29.00	1	Venezuela (VEN)	Lisbeli Marina Vera Andrade
Total			4		
200m T64	T44; T64	33.00	3	United States (USA)	Femita Ayanbeku; Sydney Barta; Beatriz Hatz
200m T64	T44; T64	33.00	2	Germany (GER)	Irmgard Bensusan; Maria Tietze
200m T64	T44; T64	33.00	1	Netherlands (NED)	Kimberly Alkemade
Total			5		

==== 400 metres ====
Event	Class(es)	Minimum Entry Standard (MES)	No. of athletes	NPC	Qualified athletes
400m T11	T11	1:12.00	2	Brazil (BRA)	Jhulia Karol dos Santos; Thalita Vitoria Simplicio Da Silva
400m T11	T11	1:12.00	1	China (CHN)	Liu Cuiqing
400m T11	T11	1:12.00	1	Thailand (THA)	Suneeporn Tanomwong
Total			4		
400m T12	T12	1:12.00	1	Cuba (CUB)	Omara Durand
400m T12	T12	1:12.00	1	Paraguay (PAR)	Melissa Nair Tillner Galeano
400m T12	T12	1:12.00	1	Spain (ESP)	Melani Berges Gamez
400m T12	T12	1:12.00	1	Ukraine (UKR)	Oksana Boturchuk
400m T12	T12	1:12.00	1	Venezuela (VEN)	Greilyz G. Villarroel Hernandez
Total			5		
400m T13	T13	1:16.00	1	Brazil (BRA)	Rayane Soares da Silva
400m T13	T13	1:16.00	1	Japan (JPN)	Mana Sasaki
400m T13	T13	1:16.00	1	Portugal (POR)	Carolina Duarte
400m T13	T13	1:16.00	1	Ukraine (UKR)	Leilia Adzhametova
400m T13	T13	1:16.00	1	United States (USA)	Taylor Talbot
Total			5		
400m T20	T20	1:06.00	1	Portugal (POR)	Carina Paim
400m T20	T20	1:06.00	1	Thailand (THA)	Orawan Kaising
400m T20	T20	1:06.00	1	Ukraine (UKR)	Yuliia Shuliar
400m T20	T20	1:06.00	1	United States (USA)	Breanna Clark
Total			4		
400m T37	T37	1:20.00	1	China (CHN)	Jiang Fenfen
400m T37	T37	1:20.00	1	Germany (GER)	Isabelle Foerder
400m T37	T37	1:20.00	1	RPC (RUS)	Elena Tretiakova
400m T37	T37	1:20.00	1	South Africa (RSA)	Sheryl James
400m T37	T37	1:20.00	1	Ukraine (UKR)	Nataliia Kobzar
Total			5		
400m T38	T38	1:17.00	2	Great Britain (GBR)	Kadeena Cox; Ali Smith
400m T38	T38	1:17.00	1	RPC (RUS)	Margarita Goncharova
400m T38	T38	1:17.00	1	Tunisia (TUN)	Sonia Mansour
Total			4		
400m T47	T45; T46; T47	1:14.00	1	China (CHN)	Li Lu
400m T47	T45; T46; T47	1:14.00	1	RPC (RUS)	Anastasiia Soloveva
400m T47	T45; T46; T47	1:14.00	1	South Africa (RSA)	Anrune Weyers
400m T47	T45; T46; T47	1:14.00	1	Venezuela (VEN)	Lisbeli Marina Vera Andrade
400m T47	T45; T46; T47	1:14.00	1	United States (USA)	Danielle Aravich
Total			4		
400m T53	T53	1:10.00	2	China (CHN)	Gao Fang; Zhou Hongzhuan
400m T53	T53	1:10.00	1	Great Britain (GBR)	Samantha Kinghorn
400m T53	T53	1:10.00	1	Switzerland (SUI)	Catherine Debrunner
400m T53	T53	1:10.00	1	Turkey (TUR)	Hamide Dogangun
400m T53	T53	1:10.00	1	United States (USA)	Kelsey LeFevour
Total			5		
400m T54	T54	1:01.00	3	United States (USA)	Hannah Dederick; Jenna Fesemyer; Amanda McGrory
400m T54	T54	1:01.00	2	China (CHN)	Zhou Zhaoqian; Zou Lihong
400m T54	T54	1:01.00	1	Australia (AUS)	Eliza Ault-Connell
400m T54	T54	1:01.00	1	Germany (GER)	Merle Menje
400m T54	T54	1:01.00	1	Great Britain (GBR)	Melanie Woods
Total			6		

==== 800 metres ====
Event	Class(es)	Minimum Entry Standard (MES)	No. of athletes	NPC	Qualified athletes
800m T34	T33; T34	2:50.00	2	Great Britain (GBR)	Kare Adenegan; Hannah Cockroft
800m T34	T33; T34	2:50.00	2	United States (USA)	Alexa Halko; Eva Houston
800m T34	T33; T34	2:50.00	1	RPC (RUS)	Veronika Doronina
Total			4		
800m T53	T53	2:22.00	2	Turkey (TUR)	Hamide Dogangun; Zeynep Acet
800m T53	T53	2:22.00	1	Australia (AUS)	Madison de Rozario
800m T53	T53	2:22.00	1	China (CHN)	Zhou Hongzhuan
800m T53	T53	2:22.00	1	Great Britain (GBR)	Samantha Kinghorn
800m T53	T53	2:22.00	1	Switzerland (SUI)	Catherine Debrunner
800m T53	T53	2:22.00	1	United States (USA)	Kelsey LeFevour
Total			7		
800m T54	T54	2:05.00	4	United States (USA)	Hannah Dederick; Jenna Fesemyer; Amanda McGrory; Susannah Scaroni
800m T54	T54	2:05.00	1	Australia (AUS)	Eliza Ault-Connell
800m T54	T54	2:05.00	1	China (CHN)	Zou Lihong
800m T54	T54	2:05.00	1	Germany (GER)	Merle Menje
800m T54	T54	2:05.00	1	Great Britain (GBR)	Melanie Woods
Total			6		

==== 1500 metres ====
Event	Class(es)	Minimum Entry Standard (MES)	No. of athletes	NPC	Qualified athletes
1500m T11	T11	6:20.00	2	Kenya (KEN)	Nancy Chelangat Koech; Mary Waithera Njoroge
1500m T11	T11	6:20.00	1	China (CHN)	He Shanshan
1500m T11	T11	6:20.00	1	India (IND)	Rakshitha Raju
1500m T11	T11	6:20.00	1	Mexico (MEX)	Mónica Olivia Rodríguez
1500m T11	T11	6:20.00	1	Spain (ESP)	Susana Rodriguez Gacio
1500m T11	T11	6:20.00	1	Turkey (TUR)	Oznur Akbulut
Total			7		
1500m T13	T12; T13	5:35.00	2	Kenya (KEN)	Hanah Ngendo Mwangi; Nelly Nasimiyu Munialo
1500m T13	T12; T13	5:35.00	2	RPC (RUS)	Elena Pautova; Veronika Zotova
1500m T13	T12; T13	5:35.00	1	Colombia (COL)	Francy Osorio
1500m T13	T12; T13	5:35.00	1	India (IND)	Radha Venkatesh
1500m T13	T12; T13	5:35.00	1	Morocco (MAR)	Fatima Ezzahra El Idrissi
1500m T13	T12; T13	5:35.00	1	Turkey (TUR)	Sevda Kilinc Cirakoglu
Total			8		
1500m T20	T20	5:20.00	2	Hungary (HUN)	Bernadett Biacsi; Ilona Biacsi
1500m T20	T20	5:20.00	1	Great Britain (GBR)	Hannah Taunton
1500m T20	T20	5:20.00	1	Poland (POL)	Barbara Bieganowska
1500m T20	T20	5:20.00	1	Ukraine (UKR)	Liudmyla Danylina
Total			4		
1500m T54	T53; T54	3:50.00	4	United States (USA)	Hannah Dederick; Jenna Fesemyer; Amanda McGrory; Susannah Scaroni
1500m T54	T53; T54	3:50.00	1	Australia (AUS)	Madison de Rozario
1500m T54	T53; T54	3:50.00	1	China (CHN)	Zou Lihong
1500m T54	T53; T54	3:50.00	1	Germany (GER)	Merle Menje
Total			7		

==== 5000 metres ====
Event	Class(es)	Minimum Entry Standard (MES)	No. of athletes	NPC	Qualified athletes
5000m T54	T53; T54	13:30.00	1	Australia (AUS)	Madison de Rozario
5000m T54	T53; T54	13:30.00	1	China (CHN)	Zou Lihong
5000m T54	T53; T54	13:30.00	1	Germany (GER)	Merle Menje
5000m T54	T53; T54	13:30.00	1	Netherlands (NED)	Nikita den Boer
5000m T54	T53; T54	13:30.00	1	United States (USA)	Susannah Scaroni
Total			4		

==== Marathon ====
Event	Class(es)	Minimum Entry Standard (MES)	No. of athletes	NPC	Qualified athletes
Marathon T12	T11; T12	3:35:00	1	Brazil (BRA)	Edneusa de Jesus Santos Dorta
Marathon T12	T11; T12	3:35:00	1	Japan (JPN)	Misato Michishita
Marathon T12	T11; T12	3:35:00	1	Lithuania (LTU)	Aušra Garunkšnytė
Marathon T12	T11; T12	3:35:00	1	Morocco (MAR)	Meryem An-Nourhi
Marathon T12	T11; T12	3:35:00	1	RPC (RUS)	Elena Pautova
Marathon T12	T11; T12	3:35:00	1	Spain (ESP)	Maria Del Carmen Paredes Rodriguez
Total			6		
Marathon T54	T53; T54	1:58:00	2	Australia (AUS)	Eliza Ault-Connell; Madison de Rozario
Marathon T54	T53; T54	1:58:00	2	United States (USA)	Tatyana McFadden; Susannah Scaroni
Marathon T54	T53; T54	1:58:00	1	Japan (JPN)	Tsubasa Kina
Marathon T54	T53; T54	1:58:00	1	Netherlands (NED)	Nikita den Boer
Marathon T54	T53; T54	1:58:00	1	Switzerland (SUI)	Manuela Schaer
Total			7		

=== Women's field ===
==== Long jump ====
Event	Class(es)	Minimum Entry Standard (MES)	No. of athletes	NPC	Qualified athletes
Long jump T11	T11	3.40m	1	China (CHN)	Zhou Guohua
Long jump T11	T11	3.40m	1	Japan (JPN)	Chiaki Takada
Long jump T11	T11	3.40m	1	Spain (ESP)	Meritxell Playa Faus
Long jump T11	T11	3.40m	1	Ukraine (UKR)	Yuliia Pavlenko
Total			4		
Long jump T12	T12	3.70m	1	Algeria (ALG)	Lynda Hamri
Long jump T12	T12	3.70m	1	Brazil (BRA)	Gabriela Mendonca Ferreira
Long jump T12	T12	3.70m	1	Spain (ESP)	Sara Martinez
Long jump T12	T12	3.70m	1	Ukraine (UKR)	Oksana Zubkovska
Total			4		
Long jump T20	T20	4.30m	1	Croatia (CRO)	Mikela Ristoski
Long jump T20	T20	4.30m	1	Poland (POL)	Karolina Kucharczyk
Long jump T20	T20	4.30m	1	Portugal (POR)	Erica Gomes
Long jump T20	T20	4.30m	1	RPC (RUS)	Aleksandra Ruchkina
Total			4		
Long jump T37	T37	3.50m	1	China (CHN)	Wen Xiaoyan
Long jump T37	T37	3.50m	1	France (FRA)	Manon Genest
Long jump T37	T37	3.50m	1	Poland (POL)	Marta Piotrowska
Long jump T37	T37	3.50m	1	Thailand (THA)	Aorawan Chimpaen
Long jump T37	T37	3.50m	1	United States (USA)	Jaleen Roberts
Long jump T37	T37	3.50m	1	Uzbekistan (UZB)	Sabina Sukhanova
Total			6		
Long jump T38	T38	3.75m	2	Poland (POL)	Róża Kozakowska; Anna Trener-Wierciak
Long jump T38	T38	3.75m	1	Germany (GER)	Nele Moos
Long jump T38	T38	3.75m	1	Great Britain (GBR)	Olivia Breen
Long jump T38	T38	3.75m	1	Hungary (HUN)	Luca Ekler
Long jump T38	T38	3.75m	1	RPC (RUS)	Margarita Goncharova
Total			6		
Long jump T47	T45; T46; T47	4.00m	2	RPC (RUS)	Aleksandra Moguchaia; Nikol Rodomakina
Long jump T47	T45; T46; T47	4.00m	2	Sri Lanka (SRI)	Dissanayake Mudiyansela; Amara Lallwala Palliyagurun
Long jump T47	T45; T46; T47	4.00m	1	Ecuador (ECU)	Kiara Rodriguez
Long jump T47	T45; T46; T47	4.00m	1	France (FRA)	Angelina Lanza
Long jump T47	T45; T46; T47	4.00m	1	Germany (GER)	Lise Petersen
Long jump T47	T45; T46; T47	4.00m	1	Great Britain (GBR)	Polly Maton
Long jump T47	T45; T46; T47	4.00m	1	India (IND)	Chakkungalparambil Sure
Long jump T47	T45; T46; T47	4.00m	1	New Zealand (NZL)	Anna Grimaldi
Long jump T47	T45; T46; T47	4.00m	1	United States (USA)	Taleah Williams
Total			11		
Long jump T63	T42; T61; T63	3.00m	2	Japan (JPN)	Kaede Maegawa; Tomomi Tozawa
Long jump T63	T42; T61; T63	3.00m	1	Australia (AUS)	Vanessa Low
Long jump T63	T42; T61; T63	3.00m	1	Belgium (BEL)	Gitte Haenen
Total			4		
Long jump T64	T44; T62; T64	3.80m	2	Netherlands (NED)	Fleur Jong; Marlene van Gansewinkel
Long jump T64	T44; T62; T64	3.80m	1	Australia (AUS)	Sarah Walsh
Long jump T64	T44; T62; T64	3.80m	1	Germany (GER)	Maria Tietze
Long jump T64	T44; T62; T64	3.80m	1	Great Britain (GBR)	Stefanie Reid
Long jump T64	T44; T62; T64	3.80m	1	Japan (JPN)	Maya Nakanishi
Total			6		

==== Club throw ====
Event	Class(es)	Minimum Entry Standard (MES)	No. of athletes	NPC	Qualified athletes
Club throw F32	F31; F32	13.00m	1	Algeria (ALG)	Mounia Gasmi
Club throw F32	F31; F32	13.00m	1	Great Britain (GBR)	Gemma Prescott
Club throw F32	F31; F32	13.00m	1	Tunisia (TUN)	Maroua Ibrahmi
Club throw F32	F31; F32	13.00m	1	Ukraine (UKR)	Anastasiia Moskalenko
Club throw F32	F31; F32	13.00m	1	United Arab Emirates (UAE)	Noura Alktebi
Total			4		
Club throw F51	F51	10.00m	2	India (IND)	Ekta Bhyan; Kashish Lakra
Club throw F51	F51	10.00m	1	Great Britain (GBR)	Joanna Butterfield
Club throw F51	F51	10.00m	1	RPC (RUS)	Elena Gorlova
Club throw F51	F51	10.00m	1	Ukraine (UKR)	Zoia Ovsii
Club throw F51	F51	10.00m	1	United States (USA)	Cassie Mitchell
Total			5		

==== Discus throw ====
Event	Class(es)	Minimum Entry Standard (MES)	No. of athletes	NPC	Qualified athletes
Discus throw F11	F11	18.00m	2	China (CHN)	Tang Hongxia; Zhang Liangmin
Discus throw F11	F11	18.00m	1	Brazil (BRA)	Izabela Campos
Discus throw F11	F11	18.00m	1	Italy (ITA)	Assunta Legnante
Total			4		
Discus throw F38	F37; F38	22.00m	2	China (CHN)	Li Yingli; Mi Na
Discus throw F38	F37; F38	22.00m	1	Canada (CAN)	Renee Danielle Foessel
Discus throw F38	F37; F38	22.00m	1	South Africa (RSA)	Simone Kruger
Total			4		
Discus throw F41	F40; F41	17.00m	2	Morocco (MAR)	Hayat El Garaa; Youssra Karim
Discus throw F41	F40; F41	17.00m	1	Ireland (IRL)	Niamh McCarthy
Discus throw F41	F40; F41	17.00m	1	Tunisia (TUN)	Raoua Tlili
Total			4		
Discus throw F53	F51; F52; F53	6.00m	2	Ukraine (UKR)	Iana Lebiedieva; Zoia Ovsii
Discus throw F53	F51; F52; F53	6.00m	1	Brazil (BRA)	Elizabeth Rodrigues Gomes
Discus throw F53	F51; F52; F53	6.00m	1	RPC (RUS)	Elena Gorlova
Discus throw F53	F51; F52; F53	6.00m	1	United States (USA)	Cassie Mitchell
Total			5		
Discus throw F55	F54; F55	14.50m	1	China (CHN)	Dong Feixia
Discus throw F55	F54; F55	14.50m	1	Colombia (COL)	Érica Castaño
Discus throw F55	F54; F55	14.50m	1	Latvia (LAT)	Diana Dadzite
Discus throw F55	F54; F55	14.50m	1	Mexico (MEX)	Rosa Maria Guerrero Cazares
Total			4		
Discus throw F57	F56; F57	19.00m	2	Algeria (ALG)	Safia Djelal; Nassima Saifi
Discus throw F57	F56; F57	19.00m	1	China (CHN)	Xu Mian
Discus throw F57	F56; F57	19.00m	1	Germany (GER)	Martina Willing
Discus throw F57	F56; F57	19.00m	1	Mexico (MEX)	Floralia Estrada Bernal
Total			5		
Discus throw F64	F43; F44; F62; F64	18.00m	1	Australia (AUS)	Sarah Edmiston
Discus throw F64	F43; F44; F62; F64	18.00m	1	China (CHN)	Yao Juan
Discus throw F64	F43; F44; F62; F64	18.00m	1	Denmark (DEN)	Kristel Walther
Discus throw F64	F43; F44; F62; F64	18.00m	1	Poland (POL)	Faustyna Kotlowska
Total			4		

==== Javelin throw ====
Event	Class(es)	Minimum Entry Standard (MES)	No. of athletes	NPC	Qualified athletes
Javelin throw F13	F12; F13	19.00m	1	Austria (AUT)	Natalija Eder
Javelin throw F13	F12; F13	19.00m	1	Belarus (BLR)	Lizaveta Piatrenka
Javelin throw F13	F12; F13	19.00m	1	China (CHN)	Zhao Yuping
Javelin throw F13	F12; F13	19.00m	1	Chinese Taipei (TPE)	Liu Ya-ting
Javelin throw F13	F12; F13	19.00m	1	Kazakhstan (KAZ)	Gulbakhyt Kaiyrzhanova
Javelin throw F13	F12; F13	19.00m	1	RPC (RUS)	Anna Kulinich-Sorokina
Javelin throw F13	F12; F13	19.00m	1	Uzbekistan (UZB)	Nozimakhon Kayumova
Total			7		
Javelin throw F34	F33; F34	11.50m	1	Germany (GER)	Marie Brämer-Skowronek; Frances Herrmann
Javelin throw F34	F33; F34	11.50m	1	China (CHN)	Zou Lijuan
Javelin throw F34	F33; F34	11.50m	1	Finland (FIN)	Marjaana Heikkinen
Javelin throw F34	F33; F34	11.50m	1	Poland (POL)	Lucyna Kornobys
Total			5		
Javelin throw F46	F45; F46	18.00m	1	Algeria (ALG)	Achoura Boukoufa
Javelin throw F46	F45; F46	18.00m	1	China (CHN)	Huang Yezi
Javelin throw F46	F45; F46	18.00m	1	Germany (GER)	Lise Petersen
Javelin throw F46	F45; F46	18.00m	1	Great Britain (GBR)	Hollie Arnold
Javelin throw F46	F45; F46	18.00m	1	New Zealand (NZL)	Holly Robinson
Javelin throw F46	F45; F46	18.00m	1	United Arab Emirates (UAE)	Mariam Almatrooshi
Javelin throw F46	F45; F46	18.00m	1	Uzbekistan (UZB)	Roziyakhon Ergasheva
Javelin throw F46	F45; F46	18.00m	1	Venezuela (VEN)	Naibys Daniela Morillo Gil
Total			8		
Javelin throw F54	F53; F54	9.00m	1	Colombia (COL)	Yanive Torres Martinez
Javelin throw F54	F53; F54	9.00m	1	China (CHN)	Yang Liwan
Javelin throw F54	F53; F54	9.00m	1	Nigeria (NGR)	Flora Ugwunwa
Javelin throw F54	F53; F54	9.00m	1	Tunisia (TUN)	Hania Aidi
Total			4		
Javelin throw F56	F55; F56	13.00m	1	Algeria (ALG)	Nadia Medjmedj
Javelin throw F56	F55; F56	13.00m	1	Brazil (BRA)	Raissa Rocha Machado
Javelin throw F56	F55; F56	13.00m	1	Germany (GER)	Martina Willing
Javelin throw F56	F55; F56	13.00m	1	Iran (IRI)	Hashemiyeh Motahian Moavi
Javelin throw F56	F55; F56	13.00m	1	Latvia (LAT)	Diana Dadzite
Total			5		

==== Shot put ====
Event	Class(es)	Minimum Entry Standard (MES)	No. of athletes	NPC	Qualified athletes
Shot put F12	F11; F12	9.00m	1	China (CHN)	Zhao Yuping
Shot put F12	F11; F12	9.00m	1	Great Britain (GBR)	Lydia Church
Shot put F12	F11; F12	9.00m	1	Italy (ITA)	Assunta Legnante
Shot put F12	F11; F12	9.00m	1	Mexico (MEX)	Rebeca Valenzuela Alvarez
Shot put F12	F11; F12	9.00m	1	Uzbekistan (UZB)	Safiya Burkhanova
Total			4		
Shot put F20	F20	10.00m	2	Ukraine (UKR)	Anastasiia Mysnyk; Viktoriia Shpachynska
Shot put F20	F20	10.00m	1	France (FRA)	Gloria Agblemagnon
Shot put F20	F20	10.00m	1	Great Britain (GBR)	Sabrina Fortune
Total			4		
Shot put F32	F32	3.00m	2	United Arab Emirates (UAE)	Noura Alktebi; Thekra Alkaabi
Shot put F32	F32	3.00m	1	Algeria (ALG)	Mounia Gasmi
Shot put F32	F32	3.00m	1	RPC (RUS)	Evgeniia Galaktionova
Shot put F32	F32	3.00m	1	Ukraine (UKR)	Anastasiia Moskalenko
Total			5		
Shot put F33	F33	3.50m	2	Poland (POL)	Lucyna Kornobys; Joanna Oleksiuk
Shot put F33	F33	3.50m	1	Morocco (MAR)	Fouzia El Kassioui
Shot put F33	F33	3.50m	1	RPC (RUS)	Svetlana Krivenok
Total			4		
Shot put F34	F34	5.20m	1	China (CHN)	Zou Lijuan
Shot put F34	F34	5.20m	1	Germany (GER)	Marie Brämer-Skowronek
Shot put F34	F34	5.20m	1	Great Britain (GBR)	Vanessa Wallace
Shot put F34	F34	5.20m	1	India (IND)	Bhagyashri Madavrai Jadhav
Shot put F34	F34	5.20m	1	Morocco (MAR)	Saida Amoudi
Shot put F34	F34	5.20m	1	New Zealand (NZL)	Jessica Gillan
Total			6		
Shot put F35	F35	6.00m	1	Brazil (BRA)	Marivana Oliveira
Shot put F35	F35	6.00m	1	China (CHN)	Wang Jun
Shot put F35	F35	6.00m	1	Great Britain (GBR)	Anna Nicholson
Shot put F35	F35	6.00m	1	Ukraine (UKR)	Mariia Pomazan
Total			4		
Shot put F36	F36	6.00m	2	Germany (GER)	Birgit Kober; Juliane Mogge
Shot put F36	F36	6.00m	1	China (CHN)	Wu Qing
Shot put F36	F36	6.00m	1	RPC (RUS)	Galina Lipatnikova
Total			4		
Shot put F37	F37	7.50m	2	China (CHN)	Li Yingli; Mi Na
Shot put F37	F37	7.50m	1	New Zealand (NZL)	Lisa Adams
Shot put F37	F37	7.50m	1	RPC (RUS)	Irina Vertinskaya
Total			4		
Shot put F40	F40	4.00m	2	Tunisia (TUN)	Rima Abdelli; Raja Jebali
Shot put F40	F40	4.00m	1	Bhutan (BHU)	Chimi Dema
Shot put F40	F40	4.00m	1	Nigeria (NGR)	Lauritta Onye
Shot put F40	F40	4.00m	1	Poland (POL)	Renata Śliwińska
Total			5		
Shot put F41	F41	5.50m	1	Argentina (ARG)	Antonella Ruiz Diaz
Shot put F41	F41	5.50m	1	Australia (AUS)	Claire Keefer
Shot put F41	F41	5.50m	1	Morocco (MAR)	Youssra Karim
Shot put F41	F41	5.50m	1	Tunisia (TUN)	Raoua Tlili
Total			4		
Shot put F54	F54	4.30m	1	Chile (CHI)	Francisca Mardones Sepulveda
Shot put F54	F54	4.30m	1	China (CHN)	Yang Liwan
Shot put F54	F54	4.30m	1	Mexico (MEX)	Gloria Zarza Guadarrama
Shot put F54	F54	4.30m	1	RPC (RUS)	Mariia Bogacheva
Total			4		
Shot put F57	F56; F57	7.00m	2	Algeria (ALG)	Safia Djelal; Nassima Saifi
Shot put F57	F56; F57	7.00m	1	China (CHN)	Xu Mian
Shot put F57	F56; F57	7.00m	1	Germany (GER)	Martina Willing
Shot put F57	F56; F57	7.00m	1	Mexico (MEX)	María de los Ángeles Ortiz
Total			4		

=== Mixed events ===
Universal relay
Event	Class(es)	Minimum Entry Standard (MES)	Slots	Qualified NPCs
2019 World Para Athletics Championships	T11-13; T33-34/T51-54; T35-38; T42-47/T61-64	—N/a	3	United States (USA); China (CHN); RPC (RPC)
Universal Relay Qualification Ranking	T11-13; T33-34/T51-54; T35-38; T42-47/T61-64	—N/a	7	Brazil (BRA); Canada (CAN); France (FRA); Germany (GER); Great Britain (GBR); Indonesia (INA); Japan (JPN)
Total			10	

== See also ==
- Athletics at the 2020 Summer Olympics – Qualification
