= Paraguay at the 2020 Summer Paralympics =

- IPC code: PAR
- NPC: Paraguayan Paralympic Committee

in Tokyo
- Competitors: 2 in 2 sports
- Flag bearers: Melissa Nair Tillner and Rodrigo Hermosa
- Medals: Gold 0 Silver 0 Bronze 0 Total 0

Summer Paralympics appearances (overview)
- 2020; 2024

Paraguay competed at the 2020 Summer Paralympics in Tokyo, Japan, from 24 August to 5 September 2021. It was the first time that Paraguay had participated in the Paralympic Games. They sent two competitors: T12 runner Melissa Tillner and S9 swimmer Rodrigo Hermosa. Tillner came last in all three of the races she competed in, but achieved her personal best in all of them. Hermosa came 22nd out of the 25 competitors with a time just under 30 seconds.

== Background ==
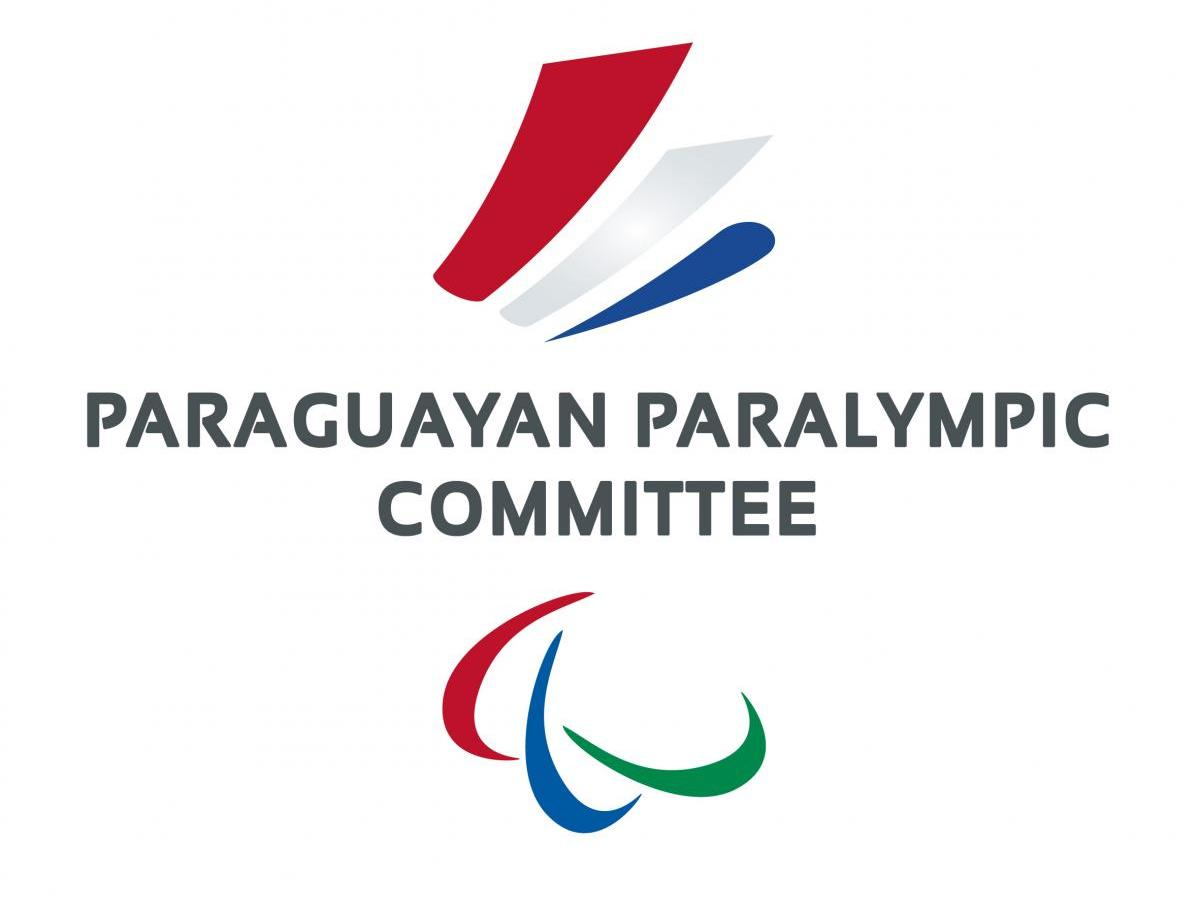
Paraguayan Paralympic Committee logo

Paraguay's Sports National Secretariat had been working for five years to develop and promote the Paralympics before the country was approved as a provisional member of the International Paralympic Committee in 2018. It was then granted full membership at the 2019 General Assembly. Hignia Giosa became the first president of the newly established Paraguayan Paralympic Committee (Spanish: Comité Paralímpico Paraguayo). Paraguay was one of five countries to make their first appearance in the 2020 Summer Paralympic Games; the others were Bhutan, Grenada, Maldives and Saint Vincent and the Grenadines. President of Paraguay Mario Abdo Benítez met with the athletes at the start of August where he handed over the national flag. Paraguay's flag bearers were Melissa Nair Tillner and Rodrigo Hermosa who were Paraguay's only competitors and qualified after getting wild cards.

== Athletics ==
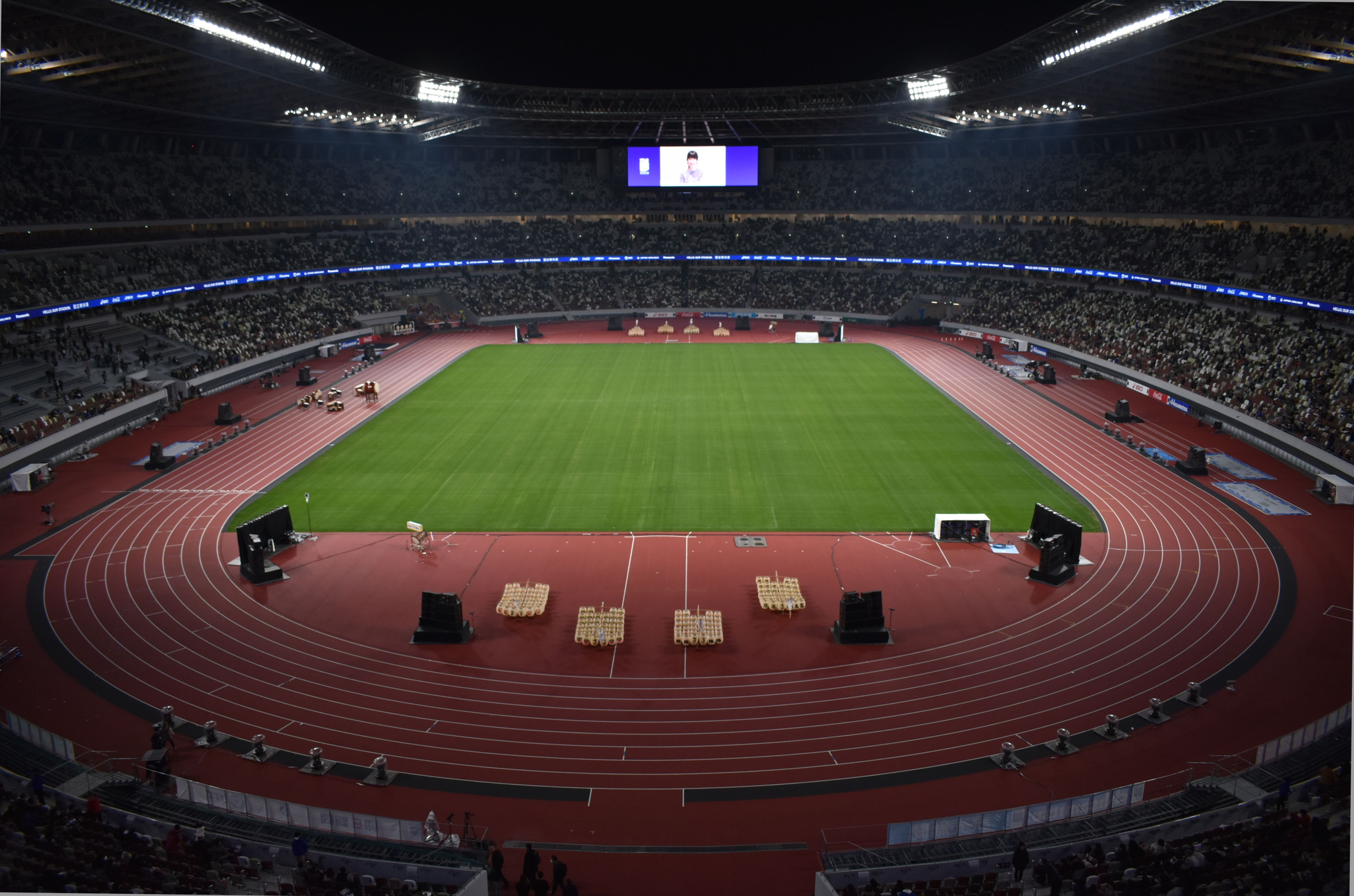
The Japan National Stadium where the track and field events took place.

Melissa Nair Tillner Galeano (Note: In this Spanish name, the first or paternal surname is Tillner and the second or maternal family name is Galeano.), aged 21 became the first Paraguayan athlete to compete at the Paralympics. Tillner is visually impaired and competes in T12 races with her guide Victor Duarte Adorno. On 24 August, Tillner came last in her heat in the 200 meters T12 race with a time of 34.91 seconds which was 10.85 seconds slower than the winner of the heat Omara Durand. She then came last in the 100 meters T12 race on 26 August 2021 and 400 meters T12 race on 27 August 2021.

Women's track

Athlete	Events	Heats		Final	
Athlete	Events	Time	Rank	Time	Rank
Melissa Nair Tillner Guide: Victor Duarte	100 m T12	14.77 PB	3	Did not advance	10

== Swimming ==
Rodrigo Fabián Hermosa Ayala (Note: In this Spanish name, the first or paternal surname is Hermosa and the second or maternal family name is Ayala.), aged 18 became the second Paraguayan athlete to compete at the Paralympics. Hermosa was born without his right arm and competes in S9 races. He had previously reached the final in both the S9 50m freestyle and the S9 100m freestyle at the 2019 Parapan American Games in Lima. In the heats of the 50 metre freestyle S9 race on 29 August 2021, he beat both his opponents but did not qualify for the final as he was not in the top eight overall.

Men

Athlete	Event	Heats		Final	
Athlete	Event	Result	Rank	Result	Rank
Rodrigo Hermosa	50m freestyle S9	29.72	1	Did not advance	22

== See also ==
- Paraguay at the 2020 Summer Olympics
