= Maldives at the 2020 Summer Paralympics =

- IPC code: MDV

in Tokyo
- Competitors: 2 in 1 sport
- Medals: Gold 0 Silver 0 Bronze 0 Total 0

Summer appearances
- 2020

Maldives competed at the 2020 Summer Paralympics in Tokyo, Japan, from 24 August to 5 September 2021. This was the country's debut appearance at the Paralympics.

== Athletics ==
Track

Athlete	Event	Heats		Final	
Athlete	Event	Result	Rank	Result	Rank
Mohamed Mazin	Men's 100 m T11	-	DQ	Did not advance	
Fathimath Ibrahim	Women's 100 m T11	18.08	4 PB	Did not advance	

== See also ==
- Maldives at the 2020 Summer Olympics
