= Melissa Tillner =

Paraguayan Paralympic athlete

Personal information
- Full name: Melissa Nair Tillner Galeano
- Nickname: Meli
- Nationality: Paraguayan
- Born: 16 June 2000 (age 26) Asunción, Paraguay
- Height: 171 cm (5 ft 7 in)

Sport
- Sport: Paralympic athletics
- Disability class: T12
- Event: Sprint
- Coached by: Edgar Galeano

Melissa Nair Tillner Galeano (born 26 June 2000) is a Para athlete from Paraguay competing mainly in category T12 sprint events. She has been visually impaired since she was eleven years old.

== Career ==
Along with Rodrigo Hermosa, she became the first Paraguayan athlete at the Paralympic Games in the country's debut in Tokyo 2020. There she competed in the 100 metres T12 event, finishing third in her heat and making her personal best with 14.77'.

She has participated in two editions of the Parapan American Games: in Lima 2019 and Santiago 2023, she was the country's flagbearers during both editions opening ceremony, in Santiago with cyclist Iván Cáceres. In 2023 she competed in three events: the 100 m, the 200 m and the 400 m, finishing in fifth place for the later.

She is competed at the 2024 Summer Paralympics in Paris in the 100 m T12 and 200 m T12 events.

Paralympics
Preceded by -	Flagbearer for Paraguay (with Rodrigo Hermosa); Tokyo 2020	Succeeded by Melissa Tillner
Preceded by Melissa Tillner and Rodrigo Hermosa	Flagbearer for Paraguay; Paris 2024	Succeeded by Incumbent
