= 2023 World Para Athletics Championships – Men's javelin throw =

Paris, France

The men's javelin throw events at the 2023 World Para Athletics Championships were held at Charlety Stadium, Paris, France, from 9 to 17 July.

== Medalists ==
Event	Gold	Silver	Bronze
F13	Dan Pembroke; Great Britain	Ali Pirouj; Iran	Ulicer Aguilera Cruz; Cuba
F34	Saeid Afrooz; Iran	Mauricio Valencia; Colombia	Diego Meneses; Colombia
F38	José Lemos; Colombia	Luis Fernando Lucumí Villegas; Colombia	Vladyslav Bilyi; Ukraine
F41	Sun Pengxiang; China	Sadegh Beit Sayah; Iran	Wildan Nukhailawi; Iraq
F46	Ajeet Singh; India	Rinku; India	Dinesh Priyantha; Sri Lanka
F54	Manolis Stefanoudakis; Greece	Ladislav Cuchran; Slovakia	Abhishek Chamoli; India
F57	Mohammad Khalvandi; Turkey	Yorkinbek Odilov; Uzbekistan	Cícero Valdiran Lins Nobre; Brazil
F64	Sumit Antil; India	Michal Burian; Australia	Dulan Kodithuwakku; Sri Lanka

== Results ==
=== F13 ===
The final of the Men's Javelin Throw F13 took place at on 15 Jul 2023.

Rank	Athlete	Attempt						Result	Notes
Rank	Athlete	1	2	3	4	5	6	Result	Notes
1st place, gold medalist(s)	Daniel Pembroke (GBR)	65.97	70.5	66.85	66.27	-	63.54	70.50	AR
2nd place, silver medalist(s)	Ali Pirouj (IRI)	56.89	57.43	60.96	62.72	63.7	63.01	63.70	
3rd place, bronze medalist(s)	Ulicer Aguilera Cruz (CUB)	59.79	59.51	X	X	56.74	54.34	59.79	SB
4	Sajad Nikparast (IRI)	59.61	59.69	X	55.54	58.21	57.36	59.69	
5	Hector Cabrera (ESP)	57.59	58.06	X	59.04	58.64	58.68	59.04	SB
6	Marek Wietecki (POL)	52.79	54.6	56.3	58.52	56.88	56.46	58.52	SB
7	Jackson Hamilton (AUS)	X	53.8	56.75	57.53	58.41	56.68	58.41	AR
8	Yuta Wakoh (JPN)	55.41	54.98	50.48	56.2	52.28	50.51	56.20	
9	Manjeet (IND)	53.86	54.56	50.33				54.56	PB
10	Orkhan Gasimov (AZE)	50.2	48.59	50.1				50.20	SB
11	Osvaldas Kucavicius (LTU)	46.39	40.76	48.12				48.12	
12	Octavian Vasile Tucaliuc (ROU)	45.06	44.28	42.19				45.06	
13	Ion Cernei (MDA)	31.54	35.34	35.27				35.34	SB

=== F34 ===
The final of Men's Javelin Throw F34 took place at 9:00 on 14 Jul 2023.

Rank	Athlete	Attempt						Result	Notes
Rank	Athlete	1	2	3	4	5	6	Result	Notes
1st place, gold medalist(s)	Saeid Afrooz (IRI)	39.57	38.67	40.27	39.94	38.51	38.31	40.27	WR
2nd place, silver medalist(s)	Mauricio Valencia (COL)	36.68	36.23	34.7	37.82	38.01	35.78	38.01	
3rd place, bronze medalist(s)	Diego Meneses (COL)	X	37.84	37.84	37.47	33.65	36.32	37.84	PB
4	Zhang Zhongqiang (CHN)	X	34.48	X	34.58	34.82	35.74	35.74	SB
5	Faouzi Rzig (TUN)	30.21	31.24	X	32.06	X	30.97	32.06	
6	Muhsin Kaedi (TUR)	X	30.77	29.54	30.75	30.56	29.44	30.77	
7	Azeddine Nouiri (MAR)	X	25.6	28.71	27.7	29.5	29.2	29.5	SB
8	Louis Gervais Baha (CMR)	25.75	23.73	22.26	22.8	24.15	X	25.75	PB
9	Karolis Virkutis (LTU)	21.86	X	X	22.92	22.34	18.13	22.92	
10	Giuseppe Campoccio (ITA)	X	21.21	22.13	X	22.12	19.88	22.13	

=== F38 ===
The final of the Men's Javelin Throw F38 took place at 10:20 on 9 Jul 2023.

Rank	Athlete	Attempt						Result	Notes
Rank	Athlete	1	2	3	4	5	6	Result	Notes
1st place, gold medalist(s)	José Lemos (COL)	55.45	58.14		-	-	57.9	58.14	CR
2nd place, silver medalist(s)	Luis Fernando Lucumí Villegas (COL)	44.48	51.41	53.28	51.87	53.11	49.94	53.28	SB
3rd place, bronze medalist(s)	Vladyslav Bilyi (UKR)	49.08	47.52	47.78	44.38	46.81	36.01	49.08	SB
4	Oleksandr Doroshenko (UKR)	42.52	43.61	44.31	46.89	X	45.67	46.89	
5	Corey Anderson (AUS)	42.97	41.92	44.89	X	41.77	44.27	44.89	
6	Cody Jones (USA)	40.25	38.04	39.43	39.08	33.96	41.54	41.54	
7	Davit Kavtaradze (GEO)		X 33.33	35.14	30.77	37.51	32.32	37.51	PB

=== F41 ===
The final of the Men's Javelin Throw F41 took place at 17:38 on 17 Jul 2023.

Rank	Athlete	Attempt						Result	Notes
Rank	Athlete	1	2	3	4	5	6	Result	Notes
1st place, gold medalist(s)	Sun Pengxiang (CHN)	44.63	45.73	43.4	45.37	46.24	47.55	47.55	WR
2nd place, silver medalist(s)	Sadegh Beit Sayah (IRI)	45.46	44.39	44.43	42.5	40.72	42.39	45.46	
3rd place, bronze medalist(s)	Wildan Nukhailawi (IRQ)	37.41	41.27	37.63	40.18	37.15	42.09	42.09	SB
4	Navdeep (IND)	38.33	37.13	39.29	X	40.05	X	40.05	
5	Omer Faruk Ilkin (TUR)	37.29		X 38.47	33.62	X	X	38.47	PB
6	Hagan Landry (USA)	38.31	36.85	x	X	35.26	36.87	38.31	AR
7	Fan Chengcheng (CHN)	36.3	34.78	35.57	36.92	35.04	X	36.92	
8	Ever Castro (CUB)	35.29	36.63	35.68	34.99	35.85	35.78	36.63	PB
9	Vladimir Gaspar (CRO)	34.06	35.88	33.4				35.88	
10	Iosefo Rakesa (FIJ)	x	X	30.94				30.94	SB
11	Ravi Rongali (IND)	x	25.48	x				25.48	

=== F46 ===
The final of the Men's Javelin Throw F46 took place at 18:38 on 16 Jul 2023.

Rank	Athlete	Attempt						Result	Notes
Rank	Athlete	1	2	3	4	5	6	Result	Notes
1st place, gold medalist(s)	Ajeet Singh (IND)	X	63.36	65.41	64.99	64.71	X	65.41	CR
2nd place, silver medalist(s)	Rinku (IND)	62.95	61.41	63.39	64.79	63.33	65.38	65.38	SB
3rd place, bronze medalist(s)	Dinesh Priyantha Herath (SRI)	58.76	58.4	58.83	65.38	63.24	63.42	65.38	SB
4	Sundar Singh Gurjar (IND)	X	59.38	57.73	61.81	X	61.1	61.81	
5	Akihiro Yamazaki (JPN)	55.89	59.6	57.63	58.24	57.44	61.24	61.24	PB
6	Guillermo Varona (CUB)	60.12	58.26	58.81	58.63	58.03	60.96	60.96	SB
7	Gabriel Buenaventes (MEX)	55.58	56.5	55.86	55.42	56.19	X	56.50	
8	Shunya Takahashi (JPN)	54.25	52.32	53.37	53.94	55.65	55.76	55.76	
9	Nam Kiwon (KOR)	46.81	41.96	45.58				46.81	SB
10	Raivo Maksims (LAT)	37.54	44.56	44.81				44.81	PB

=== F54 ===
The final of the Men's Javelin Throw F54 took place at 9:00 on 16 Jul 2023.

Rank	Athlete	Attempt						Result	Notes
Rank	Athlete	1	2	3	4	5	6	Result	Notes
1st place, gold medalist(s)	Manolis Stefanoudakis (GRE)	25.46	28.61	28.62	28.8	28.7	29.17	29.17	SB
2nd place, silver medalist(s)	Ladislav Cuchran (SVK)	28.5	28.87	28.81	28.48	27.83	28.94	28.94	SB
3rd place, bronze medalist(s)	Abhishek Chamoli (IND)	22.97	22.04	X	X	24.16	X	24.16	SB

=== F57 ===
The final of the Men's Javelin Throw F57 took place at 18:34 on 10 Jul 2023.

Rank	Athlete	Attempt						Result	Notes
Rank	Athlete	1	2	3	4	5	6	Result	Notes
1st place, gold medalist(s)	Mohammad Khalvandi (TUR)	47.42	49.31	48.76	49.98	48.34	X	49.98	CR
2nd place, silver medalist(s)	Yorkinbek Odilov (UZB)	49.39	X	X	X	X	47.07	49.39	PB
3rd place, bronze medalist(s)	Cicero Valdiran Lins Nobre (BRA)	48.13	46.57	43.24	46.50	47.98	48.31	48.31	
4	Amanolah Papi (IRI)	x	48.18	X	X	X	X	48.18	
5	Vitolio Kavakava (FRA)	40.53	40.48	42.68	43.06	42.91	43.56	43.56	PB
6	Youssoupha Diouf (SEN)	43.14	X	41.31	42.75	42.78	40.57	43.14	
7	Fauzi Purwolaksono (INA)	40.87	42.01	36.65	X	40.16	38.45	42.01	
8	Fonseca Gerdan (CUB)	40.83	38.72	X	38.77	38.71	39.64	40.83	PB
9	Sakchai Yimbanchang (THA)	37.94	40.73	40.75	39.18	40.65	40.19	40.75	SB
10	Marilson Fernandes (CPV)	X	X	33.49	38.20	35.32	X	38.20	PB
11	James Mangerere (KEN)	X	36.93	35.41	34.65	35.13	37.55	37.55	SB
12	Ramunas Rojus (LTU)	34.42	31.40	33.31	34.17	32.60	34.18	34.42	

=== F64 ===
The final of the Men's Javelin Throw F64 took place at 9:38 on 13 Jul 2023.

Rank	Athlete	Attempt						Result	Notes
Rank	Athlete	1	2	3	4	5	6	Result	Notes
1st place, gold medalist(s)	Sumit Antil (IND)	70.83	X	67.11	69.67	70.44	67.41	70.83	WR
2nd place, silver medalist(s)	Michal Burian (AUS)	61.93	63.09	61.39	61.03	61.63	65.21	65.21	SB
3rd place, bronze medalist(s)	Dulan Kodithuwakku (SRI)	58.89	64.05	57.7	63.73	57.53	64.06	64.06	SB
4	Zakariae Ez Zouhri (MAR)	61.14	61.37	62.03	60.81	58.34	62.5	62.5	AR
5	Pushpendra Singh (IND)	58.94	61.44	X	62.09	61.42	60.72	62.09	WR
6	Sandeep Chaudhary (IND)	61.3	59.32	61.33	X	59.37	X	61.33	
7	Edenilson Roberto (BRA)	57.93	58.63	55.94	X	X	55.49	58.63	
8	Roman Novak (UKR)	57.87	58.42	X	56.35	54.54	55.96	58.42	AR
9	Jonas Spudis (LTU)	45.02	52.85	X				52.85	SB
10	William Tchuisseu Tchapo (CMR)	35.66	40.27	X				40.27	SB
