= Athletics at the 2024 Summer Paralympics – Men's javelin throw =

Men's javelin throw at the XVII Paralympic Games
- Venue: Stade de France
- Dates: 30 August – 7 September 2024
- Competitors: 68 from 35 nations

The men's javelin throw events at the 2024 Summer Paralympics in Paris took place between 30 August and 7 September 2024. Eight events were held, all by way of direct final, and 68 athletes took part across all eight events.

== Schedule ==
F	Final

Date	Fri 30		Sat 31		Sun 1		Mon 2		Tue 3		Wed 4		Thu 5		Fri 6		Sat 7	
Event	M	E	M	E	M	E	M	E	M	E	M	E	M	E	M	E	M	E
Javelin throw F13														F				
Javelin throw F34											F							
Javelin throw F38	F																	
Javelin throw F41																		F
Javelin throw F46										F								
Javelin throw F54															F			
Javelin throw F57				F														
Javelin throw F64								F										

== Medal summary ==
=== Medal table ===
* Host nation (France)

Rank	NPC	Gold	Silver	Bronze	Total
1	India	2	1	1	4
2	Colombia	1	1	1	3
3	Iran	1	1	0	2
4	Cuba	1	0	1	2
5	Great Britain	1	0	0	1
5	Uzbekistan	1	0	0	1
–	Neutral Paralympic Athletes	1	0	0	1
7	China	0	1	1	2
8	Mexico	0	1	0	1
8	Sri Lanka	0	1	0	1
8	Turkey	0	1	0	1
8	Ukraine	0	1	0	1
12	Australia	0	0	1	1
12	Brazil	0	0	1	1
12	Greece	0	0	1	1
12	Iraq	0	0	1	1
Totals (15 entries)		8	8	8	24

=== Medalists ===
The following is a summary of the medals awarded across all javelin throw events.

Classification	Gold		Silver		Bronze	
F13	Dan Pembroke; Great Britain	74.49 WR	Ali Pirouj; Iran	69.74 PB	Ulicer Aguilera; Cuba	62.51 AR
F34	Saeid Afrooz; Iran	41.16 WR	Mauricio Valencia; Colombia	39.04 AR	Diego Meneses; Colombia	37.17 SB
F38	José Lemos; Colombia	63.81 WR	Vladyslav Bilyi; Ukraine	52.86	An Dongquan; China	51.97
F41	Navdeep Singh; India	47.32	Sun Pengxiang; China	44.72	Wildan Nukhailawi; Iraq	40.46
F46	Guillermo Varona; Cuba	66.14 AR	Ajeet Singh Yadav; India	65.62 PB	Sundar Singh Gurjar; India	49.46 SB
F54	Ivan Revenko; Neutral Paralympic Athletes	30.77 PB	Edgar Fuentes; Mexico	30.53 SB	Manolis Stefanoudakis; Greece	30.13
F57	Yorkinbek Odilov; Uzbekistan	50.32 AR	Muhammet Khalvandi; Turkey	49.97 SB	Cicero Valdiran Lins Nobre; Brazil	49.46
F64	Sumit Antil; India	70.59 PR	Dulan Kodithuwakku; Sri Lanka	67.03 SB	Michal Burian; Australia	64.89 SB

== Results ==
=== F13 ===
incorporating F12 athletes

==== Records ====
Prior to the competition, the existing records were as follows:

F12
World Record	Héctor Cabrera (ESP)	64.89	(United Arab Emirates) Dubai	13 November 2019
Paralympic Record	Zhu Pengkai (CHN)	64.38	(United Kingdom) London	5 September 2012

Area	Record		Athlete	Location	Date
Africa	54.30		(Algeria) Samir Belhouchat	(Netherlands) Assen	8 September 2006
America	50.39		(Brazil) Brendow Christian	(Brazil) São Paulo	8 June 2024
Asia	64.38	PR	(China) Zhu Pengkai	(United Kingdom) London	5 September 2012
Europe	64.89	WR	(Spain) Héctor Cabrera	(United Arab Emirates) Dubai	13 November 2019
Oceania	38.39		(Australia) Stuart McLay	(Canada) Quebec	11 August 2003

F13
World Record	Aleksandr Svechnikov (UZB)	71.01	(United Kingdom) London	19 July 2017
Paralympic Record	Dan Pembroke (GBR)	69.52	(Japan) Tokyo	2 September 2021

Area	Record		Athlete	Location	Date
Africa	57.64		(Algeria) Samir Belhouchat	(New Zealand) Christchurch	29 January 2011
America	61.11		(Cuba) Ulicer Aguilera	(Chile) Santiago	21 November 2023
Asia	71.01	WR	(Uzbekistan) Aleksandr Svechnikov	(United Kingdom) London	19 July 2017
Europe	70.50		(United Kingdom) Dan Pembroke	(France) Paris	15 July 2023
Oceania	58.72		(Australia) Jackson Hamilton	(Japan) Kobe	23 May 2024

==== Results ====
In 2012, an elbow injury cost up and coming British javelin thrower Dan Pembroke, then only 21, the opportunity to compete at his home Olympic Games. At the time he competed as a standard able-bodied athlete, although he had suffered from progressively more serious vision impairment from the age of six. Disheartened, Pembroke left the sport, but returned seven years later at the invitation of the British Paralympic Association as his eyesight had now degenerated to the extent that he qualified in the F13 paralympic classification. In Tokyo, he won gold in an empty stadium with a throw of 69 metres.

Now 33, Pembroke came to Paris with two goals; to win his second Paralympic gold in front of a full house in Stade de France, and to make a throw approaching his best efforts from his younger able-bodied athletics days.

In round 4 of the Paris event, he achieved both goals, obliterating the world, European and Paralympic Games records, not to mention the field, with an enormous throw of 74.49 metres, three and a half metres beyond the previous world mark, almost five metres further than the third round throw of the silver medal, Ali Pirouj of Iran, and more than 10 metres beyond anyone else in the field. An Americas record of 62.51 metres was enough to bring Ulicer Aguilera of Cuba the bronze medal.

Rank	Name	Nationality	Class	1	2	3	4	5	6	Best	Notes
1st place, gold medalist(s)	Dan Pembroke	Great Britain	F13	68.39	66.85	71.15	74.49	–	x	74.49	WR
2nd place, silver medalist(s)	Ali Pirouj	Iran	F13	x	60.41	69.74	60.62	67.83	62.87	69.74	PB
3rd place, bronze medalist(s)	Ulicer Aguilera	Cuba	F13	61.29	61.09	62.51	x	60.38	r	62.51	AR
4	Héctor Cabrera	Spain	F12	57.17	57.06	62.04	55.72	61.11	56.44	62.04	SB
5	Sajad Nikparast	Iran	F13	60.44	56.87	54.56	59.02	56.92	55.55	60.44	
6	Jackson Hamilton	Australia	F13	59.20	45.40	54.49	47.21	r		59.20	AR
7	Yuta Wakoh	Japan	F12	53.56	55.43	58.49	53.44	55.06	52.98	58.49	SB
8	Marek Wietecki	Poland	F12	55.30	54.33	56.02	53.61	54.10	57.04	57.04	

=== F34 ===
==== Records ====
Prior to the competition, the existing records were as follows:

World Record	Saeid Afrooz (IRI)	40.27	(France) Paris	14 July 2023
Paralympic Record	Saeid Afrooz (IRI)	40.05	(Japan) Tokyo	1 September 2021

Area	Record		Athlete	Location	Date
Africa	34.26		(Tunisia) Faouzi Rzig	(Tunisia) Tunis	29 June 2019
America	38.23		(Colombia) Mauricio Valencia	(Switzerland) Nottwil	27 May 2023
Asia	40.27	WR	(Iran) Saeid Afrooz	(France) Paris	29 August 2021
Europe	31.90		(Turkey) Muhsin Kaedi	(United Arab Emirates) Dubai	13 February 2024
Oceania	21.11		(Papua New Guinea) Morea Mararos	(Japan) Tokyo	1 September 2021

==== Results ====
A South American record from Mauricio Valencia of Colombia was not enough to threaten the dominant Iranian, Saeid Afrooz, who bettered his own world record on three occasions in the final.

Rank	Name	Nationality	Class	1	2	3	4	5	6	Best	Notes
1st place, gold medalist(s)	Saeid Afrooz	Iran	F34	40.18	40.67	41.16	39.87	x	40.86	41.16	WR
2nd place, silver medalist(s)	Mauricio Valencia	Colombia	F34	33.00	37.70	x	32.27	39.04	x	39.04	AR
3rd place, bronze medalist(s)	Diego Meneses	Colombia	F34	35.90	35.23	36.72	36.80	37.17	x	37.17	SB
4	Zhang Zhongqiang	China	F34	35.68	x	35.56	35.64	x	x	35.68	
5	Hussein Khafaji	Iraq	F34	34.53	34.09	33.87	x	33.84	33.50	34.53	
6	Lin Wenbang	China	F34	31.73	31.33	32.27	x	32.67	33.33	33.33	
7	Azeddine Nouiri	Morocco	F34	28.87	29.64	x	30.15	30.30	29.88	30.30	SB
8	Eduardo dos Santos	Brazil	F34	x	x	25.12	x	23.78	–	25.12	

=== F38 ===
==== Records ====
Prior to the competition, the existing records were as follows:

World Record	José Lemos (COL)	61.76	(Chile) Santiago	24 November 2023
Paralympic Record	José Lemos (COL)	60.31	(Japan) Tokyo	27 August 2021

Area	Record		Athlete	Location	Date
Africa	54.63		(South Africa) Reinhardt Hamman	(United Arab Emirates) Dubai	9 November 2019
America	61.76	WR	(Colombia) José Lemos	(Chile) Santiago	24 November 2023
Asia	52.52		(China) An Dongquan	(China) Hangzhou	25 October 2023
Europe	55.34		(Ukraine) Vladyslav Bilyi	(Japan) Tokyo	27 August 2021
Oceania	58.18		(Australia) Corey Anderson	(Australia) Brisbane	8 March 2020

==== Results ====
The final played on 30 August 2024, at 12:09:

Rank	Name	Nationality	Class	1	2	3	4	5	6	Best	Notes
1st place, gold medalist(s)	José Lemos	Colombia	F38	55.50	58.45	58.84	63.81	–	r	63.81	WR
2nd place, silver medalist(s)	Vladyslav Bilyi	Ukraine	F38	51.93	x	52.86	52.18	x	x	52.86	SB
3rd place, bronze medalist(s)	An Dongquan	China	F38	47.04	51.97	49.96	x	x	48.91	51.97	SB
4	Oleksandr Doroshenko	Ukraine	F38	51.85	51.14	x	49.26	50.16	x	51.85	SB
5	Luis Fernando Lucumí Villegas	Colombia	F38	45.60	46.62	47.26	50.32	47.18	46.78	50.32	
6	Corey Anderson	Australia	F38	49.34	48.43	47.51	48.83	48.60	47.00	49.34	
7	Petr Vrátil	Czech Republic	F38	35.83	37.96	x	35.93	x	x	37.96	
8	Davit Kavtaradze	Georgia	F38	x	33.09	35.71	33.99	x	r	35.71	
9	Cosmol Maefolia	Solomon Islands	F38	x	x	25.62	Did not advance			25.62	

=== F41 ===
==== Records ====
Prior to the competition, the existing records were as follows:

World Record	Sun Pengxiang (CHN)	48.94	(Japan) Kobe	25 May 2024
Paralympic Record	Sun Pengxiang (CHN)	47.13	(Japan) Tokyo	4 September 2021

Area	Record		Athlete	Location	Date
Africa	37.51		(Tunisia) Mohamed Amara	(Tunisia) Tunis	23 March 2015
America	38.31		(United States) Hagan Landry	(France) Paris	17 July 2023
Asia	48.94	WR	(China) Sun Pengxiang	(Japan) Kobe	25 May 2024
Europe	40.54		(United Kingdom) Mathias Mester	(United Kingdom) London	17 July 2017
Oceania	36.95	Record mark			

==== Results ====
Rank	Name	Nationality	Class	1	2	3	4	5	6	Best	Notes
1st place, gold medalist(s)	Navdeep Singh	India	F41	X	46.39	47.32	X	46.05	X	47.32	PB
2nd place, silver medalist(s)	Sun Pengxiang	China	F41	41.75	X	44.56	43.88	44.72	41.98	44.72	
3rd place, bronze medalist(s)	Wildan Nukhailawi	Iraq	F41	38.62	40.46	39.85	X	37.77	38.97	40.46	
4	Kah Michel Ye	Ivory Coast	F41	32.88	32.96	30.39	37.42	34.87	37.69	37.69	AR
5	Ever Castro	Cuba	F41	34.34	32.42	32.88	30.73	30.45	32.29	34.34	
	Sadegh Beit Sayah	Iran	F41							DQ	R8.1

=== F46 ===
==== Records ====
Prior to the competition, the existing records were as follows:

World Record	Joshua Cinnamo (USA)	16.80	(United Arab Emirates) Dubai	15 November 2019
Paralympic Record	Greg Stewart (CAN)	16.75	(Japan) Tokyo	1 September 2021

Area	Record		Athlete	Location	Date
Africa	16.13		(South Africa) Kerwin Noemdo	(South Africa) Bloemfontein	23 March 2024
America	16.80	WR	(United States) Joshua Cinnamo	(United Arab Emirates) Dubai	15 November 2019
Asia	16.30		(India) Sachin Sarjerao Khilari	(Japan) Kobe	22 May 2024
Europe	16.29		Nikita Prokhorov	(Japan) Tokyo	1 September 2021
Oceania	11.40		(Australia) Eric Mellor	(South Korea) Busan	30 October 2002

==== Results ====
Rank	Name	Nationality	Class	1	2	3	4	5	6	Best	Notes
1st place, gold medalist(s)	Guillermo Varona	Cuba	F46	63.63	66.14	64.47	62.48	x	r	66.14	AR
2nd place, silver medalist(s)	Ajeet Singh Yadav	India	F46	59.80	60.53	62.33	60.47	65.62	x	65.62	PB
3rd place, bronze medalist(s)	Sundar Singh Gurjar	India	F46	62.92	61.75	x	64.96	x	x	64.96	SB
4	Eliezer Gabriel	Mexico	F46	57.63	55.55	59.12	58.68	61.65	x	61.65	
5	Rinku Hooda	India	F46	57.34	x	60.58	x	x	61.58	61.58	SB
6	Shunya Takahashi	Japan	F46	59.28	x	59.76	x	58.31	x	59.76	
7	Akihiro Yamazaki	Japan	F46	57.57	53.87	55.48	51.35	54.85	56.89	57.57	
8	Raivo Maksims	Latvia	F46	47.34	46.45	x	44.88	47.54	45.77	47.54	
9	Jutomu Kollie	Liberia	F46	x	32.31	r				32.31	

=== F54 ===
==== Records ====
Prior to the competition, the existing records were as follows:

World Record	Justin Phongsavanh (USA)	33.29	(United States) Minneapolis	19 June 2021
Paralympic Record	Hamed Amiri (IRI)	31.35	(Japan) Tokyo	3 September 2021

Area	Record		Athlete	Location	Date
Africa	22.94		(Morocco) Abdellah Bouajaj	(Tunisia) Tunis	26 March 2016
America	33.29	WR	(United States) Justin Phongsavanh	(United States) Minneapolis	19 June 2021
Asia	31.35	PR	(Iran) Hamed Amiri	(Japan) Tokyo	3 September 2021
Europe	31.50		(Greece) Manolis Stefanoudakis	(Thailand) Nakhon Ratchasima	5 December 2023
Oceania	24.47		(Australia) Bruce Wallrodt	(Australia) Canberra	22 February 2003

==== Results ====
Rank	Name	Nationality	Class	1	2	3	4	5	6	Best	Notes
1st place, gold medalist(s)	Ivan Revenko	Neutral Paralympic Athletes	F54	30.57	30.77	30.54	30.18	x	29.77	30.77	PB
2nd place, silver medalist(s)	Edgar Fuentes	Mexico	F54	x	x	x	30.53	30.17	x	30.53	SB
3rd place, bronze medalist(s)	Manolis Stefanoudakis	Greece	F54	28.38	30.13	29.36	28.54	28.30	x	30.13	
4	Justin Phongsavanh	United States	F54	28.70	29.27	27.91	x	28.41	29.31	29.31	
5	Erfan Bondori Deraznoei	Iran	F54	25.90	26.84	29.12	26.48	26.93	26.30	29.12	
6	Ladislav Čuchran	Slovakia	F54	27.33	26.62	26.47	x	26.80	x	27.33	
7	Dipesh Kumar	India	F54	26.11	25.59	x	x	25.90	x	26.11	

=== F57 ===
==== Records ====
Prior to the competition, the existing records were as follows:

World Record	Hamed Heidari (AZE)	51.42	(Japan) Tokyo	28 August 2021
Paralympic Record	Hamed Heidari (AZE)	51.42	(Japan) Tokyo	28 August 2021

Area	Record		Athlete	Location	Date
Africa	45.42		(Senegal) Youssoupha Diouf	(Morocco) Marrakesh	26 April 2024
America	50.18		(Brazil) Cicero Valdiran Lins Nobre	(Japan) Kobe	18 May 2024
Asia	50.18		(Iran) Amanolah Papi	(Japan) Tokyo	28 August 2021
Europe	51.42	WR	(Azerbaijan) Hamed Heidari	(Japan) Tokyo	28 August 2021
Oceania	27.03	Record mark			

==== Results ====
Rank	Name	Nationality	Class	1	2	3	4	5	6	Best	Notes
1st place, gold medalist(s)	Yorkinbek Odilov	Uzbekistan	F57	48.59	50.18	50.32	48.97	46.26	46.99	50.32	AR
2nd place, silver medalist(s)	Muhammet Khalvandi	Turkey	F57	49.96	x	48.64	48.95	48.73	49.97	49.97	SB
3rd place, bronze medalist(s)	Cicero Valdiran Lins Nobre	Brazil	F57	x	x	x	47.70	49.46	x	49.46	
4	Amanolah Papi	Iran	F57	46.04	46.96	45.96	47.10	46.97	47.63	47.63	SB
5	Youssoupha Diouf	Senegal	F57	46.11	47.39	45.22	45.75	44.77	43.31	47.39	AR
6	Fauzi Purwolaksono	Indonesia	F57	44.44	43.62	42.28	44.89	45.66	x	45.66	
7	Vitolio Kavakava	France	F57	43.16	43.11	42.99	42.30	x	x	43.16	
8	Parveen Kumar	India	F57	40.21	41.91	41.23	42.12	40.35	40.42	42.12	
9	Marilson Fernandes	Cape Verde	F57	39.97	x	38.04	x	38.29	37.42	39.97	PB
10	Pablo Gimenez	Argentina	F57	33.63	34.63	35.84	33.67	x	x	35.84	
11	George Wyndham	Sierra Leone	F57	x	12.90	15.07	14.22	14.67	x	15.07	PB

=== F64 ===
==== Records ====
Prior to the competition, the existing records were as follows:

T42
World Record	Edenilson Floriani (BRA)	59.19	(Brazil) São Paulo	18 June 2022
Paralympic Record	Edenilson Floriani (BRA)	55.54	(Japan) Tokyo	30 August 2021

Area	Record		Athlete	Location	Date
Africa	48.12		(South Africa) Casper Schutte	(United Kingdom) London	7 September 2012
America	59.19	WR	(Brazil) Edenilson Floriani	(Brazil) São Paulo	18 June 2022
Asia	52.79		(China) Fu Yanlong	(United Kingdom) London	7 September 2012
Europe	37.54	Record mark			
Oceania	29.02		(Vanuatu) Kalmet Tetetom	(South Korea) Busan	30 October 2002

T44
World Record	Dulan Kodithuwakku (SRI)	66.49	(Japan) Kobe	21 May 2024
Paralympic Record	Michal Burian (AUS)	66.29	(Japan) Tokyo	30 August 2021

Area	Record		Athlete	Location	Date
Africa	62.50		(Morocco) Zakariae Ez-zouhri	(France) Paris	13 July 2023
America	59.24		(Brazil) Francisco Jefferson	(Brazil) São Paulo	18 June 2022
Asia	66.49	WR	(Sri Lanka) Dulan Kodithuwakku	(Japan) Kobe	21 May 2024
Europe	58.42		(Ukraine) Roman Novak	(France) Paris	13 July 2023
Oceania	66.29	PR	(Australia) Michal Burian	(Japan) Tokyo	30 August 2021

T64
World Record	Sumit Antil (IND)	73.29	(China) Hangzhou	25 October 2023
Paralympic Record	Sumit Antil (IND)	70.59	(France) Paris	02 September 2024

Area	Record		Athlete	Location	Date
Africa	56.24		(Cape Verde) Márcio Fernandes	(Qatar) Doha	30 October 2015
America	60.79		(Brazil) Edenilson Floriani	(Chile) Santiago	25 November 2023
Asia	73.29	WR	(India) Sumit Antil	(China) Hangzhou	25 October 2023
Europe	42.52		(Switzerland) Patrick Stoll	(Switzerland) Nottwil	16 May 2021
Oceania	55.80		(New Zealand) Rory McSweeney	(Qatar) Doha	30 October 2015

==== Results ====
The competition in this classification took place on 2 September 2024, at 18:59:

Rank	Name	Nationality	Class	1	2	3	4	5	6	Best	Notes
1st place, gold medalist(s)	Sumit Antil	India	F64	69.11	70.59	66.66	x	69.04	66.57	70.59	PR, SB
2nd place, silver medalist(s)	Dulan Kodithuwakku	Sri Lanka	F44	63.14	63.61	55.01	63.73	67.03	64.38	67.03	WR
3rd place, bronze medalist(s)	Michal Burian	Australia	F44	63.78	64.89	58.89	60.34	62.39	60.80	64.89	SB
4	Sandeep Chaudhary	India	F44	60.00	59.30	62.80	60.34	x	62.55	62.80	SB
5	Roman Novak	Ukraine	F44	52.61	x	55.02	61.04	58.85	58.53	61.04	AR
6	Zakariae Ez-zouhri	Morocco	F44	58.58	x	57.86	57.40	55.61	54.63	58.58	
7	Sandip Sanjay Sargar	India	F44	54.86	57.04	58.03	55.45	57.96	56.30	58.03	
8	Edenilson Floriani	Brazil	F42	57.99	55.74	55.99	x	54.39	x	57.99	PR, SB
9	Ken Kahu	Vanuatu	F44	x	52.01	50.04	–	–	–	52.01	PB
10	Derek Loccident	United States	F64	47.58	46.33	44.97	–	–	–	47.58	PB
