= Athletics at the 2020 Summer Paralympics – Men's javelin throw =

The Men's javelin throw athletics events for the 2020 Summer Paralympics took place at the Tokyo National Stadium from August 27 to September 4, 2021. A total of 8 events were contested in this discipline.

== Schedule ==
| R | Round 1 | ½ | Semifinals | F | Final |

| Date | Fri 27 | | Sat 28 | | Sun 29 | | Mon 30 | | Tue 31 | | Wed 1 | | Thu 2 | | Fri 3 | | Sat 4 | |
| Event | M | E | M | E | M | E | M | E | M | E | M | E | M | E | M | E | M | E |
|---|---|---|---|---|---|---|---|---|---|---|---|---|---|---|---|---|---|---|
| F13 | | | | | | | | | | | | | | F | | | | |
| F34 | | | | | | | | | | | F | | | | | | | |
| F38 | F | | | | | | | | | | | | | | | | | |
| F41 | | | | | | | | | | | | | | | | | | F |
| F46 | | | | | | | F | | | | | | | | | | | |
| F54 | | | | | | | | | | | | | | | F | | | |
| F57 | | | | F | | | | | | | | | | | | | | |
| F64 | | | | | | | | F | | | | | | | | | | |

== Medal summary ==
The following is a summary of the medals awarded across all javelin throw events.

| Classification | Gold | | Silver | | Bronze | |
|---|---|---|---|---|---|---|
| F13 | Daniel Pembroke; Great Britain | 69.52 GR | Ali Pirouj; Iran | 64.30 | Héctor Cabrera; Spain | 61.13 |
| F34 | Saeid Afrooz; Iran | 40.05 WR | Mauricio Valencia; Colombia | 37.84 | Diego Meneses; Colombia | 37.11 |
| F38 | José Lemos; Colombia | 60.31 WR | Vladyslav Bilyi; Ukraine | 55.34 AR | Luis Fernando Lucumí Villegas; Colombia | 54.63 |
| F41 | Sun Pengxiang; China | 47.13 WR | Sadegh Beit Sayah; Iran | 43.35 | Wildan Nukhailawi; Iraq | 41.39 |
| F46 | Dinesh Priyantha; Sri Lanka | 67.79 WR | Devendra Jhajharia; India | 64.35 | Sundar Singh Gurjar; India | 64.01 |
| F54 | Hamed Amiri; Iran | 31.35 GR | Alexey Kuznetsov; RPC | 31.19 AR | Justin Phongsavanh; United States | 31.09 |
| F57 | Hamed Heidari; Azerbaijan | 51.42 WR | Amanolah Papi; Iran | 49.56 AR | Cícero Valdiran Lins Nobre; Brazil | 48.93 |
| F64 | Sumit Antil; India | 68.55 WR | Michal Burian; Australia | 66.29 WR | Dulan Kodithuwakku; Sri Lanka | 65.61 |

== Results ==
=== F13 ===
Records

Prior to this competition, the existing world, Paralympic, and area records were as follows:

| World record | Aleksandr Svechnikov (UZB) | 71.01 | London, United Kingdom | 19 July 2017 |
| Paralympic record | Aleksandr Svechnikov (UZB) | 65.69 | Rio de Janeiro, Brazil | 14 September 2016 |

| Area | Distance (m) | Athlete | Nation |
|---|---|---|---|
| Africa | 57.64 | Samir Belhouchat | Algeria |
| America | 59.12 | Ulicer Aguilera Cruz | Cuba |
| Asia | 71.01 WR | Aleksandr Svechnikov | Uzbekistan |
| Europe | 66.75 | Daniel Pembroke | Great Britain |
| Oceania | 56.04 | Jackson Hamilton | Australia |

Results

The final in this classification took place on 2 September 2021, at 20:26:

| Rank | Athlete | Nationality | Class | 1 | 2 | 3 | 4 | 5 | 6 | Best | Notes |
|---|---|---|---|---|---|---|---|---|---|---|---|
| 1st place, gold medalist(s) | Daniel Pembroke | Great Britain | F13 | 59.12 | 63.65 | 69.52 | 62.38 | 63.19 | r | 69.52 | PR |
| 2nd place, silver medalist(s) | Ali Pirouj | Iran | F13 | 60.16 | 60.47 | 55.68 | 59.14 | 63.41 | 64.30 | 64.30 | PB |
| 3rd place, bronze medalist(s) | Héctor Cabrera Llácer | Spain | F12 | 61.13 | 59.95 | x | 60.77 | 51.90 | 54.11 | 61.13 | SB |
| 4 | Ulicer Aguilera Cruz | Cuba | F13 | 59.83 | 53.47 | 56.10 | 53.46 | 59.89 | 52.90 | 59.89 | AR |
| 5 | Orkhan Gasimov | Azerbaijan | F13 | 53.17 | 57.82 | 58.94 | 57.47 | 55.31 | 58.96 | 58.96 | |
| 6 | Marek Wietecki | Poland | F12 | 58.60 | 57.06 | 57.79 | 55.74 | 57.49 | 58.89 | 58.89 | SB |
| 7 | Octavian Vasile Tucaliuc | Romania | F13 | 39.32 | 43.09 | 44.41 | 43.02 | 45.51 | 40.97 | 45.51 | |

=== F34 ===
Records

Prior to this competition, the existing world, Paralympic, and area records were as follows:

| World record | Mauricio Valencia (COL) | 38.23 | Cali, Colombia | 8 April 2018 |
| Paralympic record | Mauricio Valencia (COL) | 36.65 | Rio de Janeiro, Brazil | 15 September 2016 |

| Area | Distance (m) | Athlete | Nation |
|---|---|---|---|
| Africa | 34.26 | Faouzi Rzig | Tunisia |
| America | 38.23 WR | Mauricio Valencia | Colombia |
| Asia | 38.05 | Wang Yanzhang | China |
| Europe | 31.69 | Mohsen Kaedi | Turkey |
| Oceania | 21.03 | Record Mark | |

Results

The final in this classification took place on 1 September 2021, at 9:30:

| Rank | Athlete | Nationality | 1 | 2 | 3 | 4 | 5 | 6 | Best | Notes |
|---|---|---|---|---|---|---|---|---|---|---|
| 1st place, gold medalist(s) | Saeid Afrooz | Iran | 39.48 | 39.40 | 40.05 | 39.67 | – | – | 40.05 | WR |
| 2nd place, silver medalist(s) | Mauricio Valencia | Colombia | 34.34 | 32.66 | 35.12 | 36.37 | 34.57 | 37.84 | 37.84 | SB |
| 3rd place, bronze medalist(s) | Diego Meneses | Colombia | 36.96 | 37.02 | 36.36 | 35.84 | 37.02 | 37.11 | 37.11 | PB |
| 4 | Wang Yanzhang | China | 35.53 | 36.49 | 35.26 | 31.75 | 36.19 | 35.54 | 36.49 | SB |
| 5 | Zhang Zhongqiang | China | x | 29.02 | 31.54 | 32.47 | 31.82 | 30.72 | 32.47 | SB |
| 6 | Hussein Khafaji | Iraq | x | x | 32.06 | 32.12 | 30.84 | 32.32 | 32.32 | SB |
| 7 | Azeddine Nouiri | Morocco | 30.86 | 31.17 | 27.81 | 30.34 | 29.62 | 26.35 | 31.17 | SB |
| 8 | Faouzi Rzig | Tunisia | 28.58 | 30.91 | 30.77 | 30.28 | 31.12 | 30.46 | 31.12 | SB |
| 9 | Thierry Cibone | France | 25.36 | 25.18 | 24.73 | 25.04 | 25.68 | 24.77 | 25.68 | |
| 10 | Morea Mararos | Papua New Guinea | x | 19.63 | x | x | 21.11 | 19.94 | 21.11 | AR |

=== F38 ===
Records

Prior to this competition, the existing world, Paralympic, and area records were as follows:

| World record | Corey Anderson (AUS) | 58.18 | Brisbane, Australia | 8 March 2020 |
| Paralympic record | Oleksandr Doroshenko (UKR) | 51.37 | Athens, Greece | 23 September 2004 |

| Area | Distance (m) | Athlete | Nation |
|---|---|---|---|
| Africa | 54.63 | Reinhardt Hamman | South Africa |
| America | 54.95 | Luis Fernando Lucumí Villegas | Colombia |
| Asia | 52.38 | Mohammad Naeiminia | Iran |
| Europe | 54.87 | Oleksandr Doroshenko | Ukraine |
| Oceania | 58.18 WR | Corey Anderson | Australia |

Results

The final in this classification took place on 27 August 2021, at 11:06:

| Rank | Athlete | Nationality | 1 | 2 | 3 | 4 | 5 | 6 | Notes |
|---|---|---|---|---|---|---|---|---|---|
| 1st place, gold medalist(s) | José Lemos | Colombia | 60.31 | - | - | - | - | 57.00 | WR |
| 2nd place, silver medalist(s) | Vladyslav Bilyi | Ukraine | x | 53.72 | x | 52.21 | 54.27 | 55.34 | AR |
| 3rd place, bronze medalist(s) | Luis Fernando Lucumí Villegas | Colombia | 54.63 | 53.59 | x | x | x | 54.61 | |
| 4 | Corey Anderson | Australia | 52.98 | 52.85 | 54.44 | 54.48 | 51.77 | 53.30 | SB |
| 5 | Oleksandr Doroshenko | Ukraine | 47.45 | 50.84 | x | 54.07 | x | 50.31 | SB |
| 6 | Reinhardt Hamman | South Africa | 51.13 | 51.48 | 50.24 | 52.24 | 52.49 | 50.78 | SB |
| 7 | Jayden Sawyer | Australia | 45.57 | 44.28 | 43.69 | 44.31 | 44.74 | 44.84 | |
| 8 | Ahmed Meshaima | Bahrain | 36.07 | 34.72 | x | 39.37 | 39.25 | 38.42 | SB |

=== F41 ===
Records

Prior to this competition, the existing world, Paralympic, and area records were as follows:

| World record | Sun Pengxiang (CHN) | 48.94 | Kobe, Japan | 25 May 2024 |
| Paralympic record | Sun Pengxiang (CHN) | 42.85 | Tokyo, Japan | 4 September 2021 |

| Area | Distance (m) | Athlete | Nation |
|---|---|---|---|
| Africa | 37.51 | Mohamed Amara | Tunisia |
| America | 35.27 | Hagan Landry | United States |
| Asia | 48.94 WR | Sun Pengxiang | China |
| Europe | 40.54 | Mathias Mester | Germany |
| Oceania | 36.95 | Record Mark | |

Results

The final in this classification took place on 4 September 2021, at 19:10:

| Rank | Athlete | Nationality | Class | 1 | 2 | 3 | 4 | 5 | 6 | Best | Notes |
|---|---|---|---|---|---|---|---|---|---|---|---|
| 1st place, gold medalist(s) | Sun Pengxiang | China | F41 | 45.82 | 44.58 | 43.50 | 43.96 | 47.13 | – | 47.13 | WR |
| 2nd place, silver medalist(s) | Sadegh Beit Sayah | Iran | F41 | 41.98 | 43.01 | x | 43.35 | 42.30 | 41.80 | 43.35 | PB |
| 3rd place, bronze medalist(s) | Wildan Nukhailawi | Iraq | F41 | 41.39 | 39.26 | x | 38.11 | 38.70 | 40.04 | 41.39 | SB |
| 4 | Navdeep Singh | India | F41 | 38.59 | 38.33 | 39.97 | 40.80 | x | x | 40.80 | |
| 5 | Ahmed Naas | Iraq | F40 | 33.41 | 35.70 | 35.87 | 35.57 | 37.51 | 35.36 | 37.51 | GR (F40) |
| 6 | Kovan Abdulraheem | Iraq | F41 | 36.90 | 37.19 | 36.33 | 36.34 | 33.91 | 34.28 | 37.19 | SB |
| 7 | Vladimír Gašpar | Croatia | F41 | 36.21 | x | 32.74 | 34.89 | 33.37 | 36.54 | 36.54 | SB |
| 8 | Kah Michel Ye | Ivory Coast | F41 | 31.75 | 33.87 | x | 32.20 | 33.45 | 34.41 | 34.41 | SB |

=== F46 ===
Records

Prior to this competition, the existing world, Paralympic, and area records were as follows:

| World record | Devendra Jhajharia (IND) | 63.97 | Rio de Janeiro, Brazil | 13 September 2016 |
| Paralympic record | Devendra Jhajharia (IND) | 63.97 | Rio de Janeiro, Brazil | 13 September 2016 |

| Area | Distance (m) | Athlete | Nation |
|---|---|---|---|
| Africa | 52.94 | Jan van Staden | South Africa |
| America | 61.63 | Eliezer Gabriel Buenaventura | Mexico |
| Asia | 63.97 WR | Devendra Jhajaria | India |
| Europe | 53.58 | Joerg Schiedek | Germany |
| Oceania | 39.38 | Eric Mellor | Australia |

Results

The final in this classification took place on 30 August 2021, at 11:03:

| Rank | Athlete | Nationality | 1 | 2 | 3 | 4 | 5 | 6 | Best | Notes |
|---|---|---|---|---|---|---|---|---|---|---|
| 1st place, gold medalist(s) | Dinesh Priyantha Herath Mudiyanselage | Sri Lanka | 62.58 | 62.19 | 67.79 | 62.06 | x | – | 67.79 | WR |
| 2nd place, silver medalist(s) | Devendra Jhajharia | India | 60.28 | 60.62 | 64.35 | x | x | 61.23 | 64.35 | PB |
| 3rd place, bronze medalist(s) | Sundar Singh Gurjar | India | 62.26 | 60.20 | x | x | 64.01 | x | 64.01 | SB |
| 4 | Guillermo Varona Gonzalez | Cuba | 60.96 | x | 63.30 | 62.60 | 60.10 | 61.86 | 63.30 | AR |
| 5 | Eliezer Gabriel Buenaventura | Mexico | 55.16 | 60.28 | 53.74 | 56.98 | 55.62 | 54.27 | 60.28 | SB |
| 6 | Takuya Shiramasa | Japan | 58.15 | 56.55 | 55.66 | 58.35 | 57.10 | 51.99 | 58.35 | |
| 7 | Akihiro Yamazaki | Japan | 57.32 | 57.69 | 55.20 | 50.48 | 53.59 | 48.38 | 57.69 | |
| 8 | Ajeet Singh | India | 56.15 | x | x | x | x | 52.36 | 56.15 | |
| 9 | Andrius Skuja | Lithuania | 45.09 | 42.08 | x | Did not advance | | | 45.09 | |

=== F54 ===
Records

Prior to this competition, the existing world, Paralympic, and area records were as follows:

| World record | Justin Phongsavanh (USA) | 33.29 | Minneapolis, United States | 19 June 2021 |
| Paralympic record | Manolis Stefanoudakis (GRE) | 29.45 | Rio de Janeiro, Brazil | 9 September 2016 |

| Area | Distance (m) | Athlete | Nation |
|---|---|---|---|
| Africa | 22.94 | Abdellah Bouajaj | Morocco |
| America | 33.29 WR | Justin Phongsavanh | United States |
| Asia | 30.96 | Hamed Amiri | Iran |
| Europe | 31.10 | Aliaksandr Tryputs | Belarus |
| Oceania | 24.47 | Bruce Wallrodt | Australia |

Results

The final in this classification took place on 3 September 2021, at 10:08:

| Rank | Athlete | Nationality | 1 | 2 | 3 | 4 | 5 | 6 | Best | Notes |
|---|---|---|---|---|---|---|---|---|---|---|
| 1st place, gold medalist(s) | Hamed Amiri | Iran | 31.27 | 29.49 | 29.99 | 31.35 | 28.16 | x | 31.35 | GR |
| 2nd place, silver medalist(s) | Alexey Kuznetsov | RPC | 30.26 | 31.19 | 29.90 | 30.11 | 29.39 | 29.94 | 31.19 | AR |
| 3rd place, bronze medalist(s) | Justin Phongsavanh | United States | 30.41 | x | 31.09 | 30.85 | 30.20 | 30.64 | 31.09 | |
| 4 | Manolis Stefanoudakis | Greece | 29.47 | 29.10 | 30.45 | 29.50 | 29.33 | 29.52 | 30.45 | |
| 5 | Ladislav Čuchran | Slovakia | 24.25 | 28.66 | 25.90 | 29.02 | 26.73 | 27.07 | 29.02 | |
| 6 | Edgar Ulises Fuentes Yanez | Mexico | 26.55 | 27.77 | 28.87 | x | x | 28.87 | 28.87 | SB |

=== F57 ===
Records

Prior to this competition, the existing world, Paralympic, and area records were as follows:

| World record | Cícero Valdiran Lins Nobre (BRA) | 49.26 | Dubai, United Arab Emirates | 14 November 2019 |
| Paralympic record | Mohammad Khalvandi (IRI) | 46.12 | Rio de Janeiro, Brazil | 12 September 2016 |

| Area | Distance (m) | Athlete | Nation |
|---|---|---|---|
| Africa | 43.84 | Youssoupha Diouf | Senegal |
| America | 49.26 WR | Cícero Valdiran Lins Nobre | Brazil |
| Asia | 48.60 | Amanollah Papi | Iran |
| Europe | 45.72 | Mohammad Khalvandi | Turkey |
| Oceania | 27.03 | Record Mark | |

Results

The final in this classification took place on 28 August 2021, at 19:00:

| Rank | Athlete | Nationality | Class | 1 | 2 | 3 | 4 | 5 | 6 | Best | Notes |
|---|---|---|---|---|---|---|---|---|---|---|---|
| 1st place, gold medalist(s) | Hamed Heidari | Azerbaijan | F57 | 45.68 | 47.78 | 47.00 | 49.04 | 51.42 | - | 51.42 | WR |
| 2nd place, silver medalist(s) | Amanollah Papi | Iran | F57 | 47.74 | 49.50 | 49.26 | 49.56 | 49.55 | 47.83 | 49.56 | AR |
| 3rd place, bronze medalist(s) | Cícero Valdiran Lins Nobre | Brazil | F57 | 46.21 | 46.82 | 48.93 | 48.52 | 46.62 | 48.70 | 48.93 | SB |
| 4 | Yorkinbek Odilov | Uzbekistan | F57 | 45.48 | 46.94 | 47.52 | 45.41 | 43.38 | 40.83 | 47.52 | PB |
| 5 | Mohamad Mohamad | Syria | F57 | 43.58 | 42.88 | 44.36 | 44.47 | 43.78 | 44.60 | 44.60 | SB |
| 6 | Cao Ngọc Hùng | Vietnam | F57 | 42.78 | x | 42.08 | 40.61 | 42.69 | 43.91 | 43.91 | SB |
| 7 | Youssoupha Diouf | Senegal | F57 | 40.14 | 37.42 | 40.03 | 41.74 | x | 36.34 | 41.74 | SB |
| 8 | Edgar Ismael Barajas Barajas | Mexico | F57 | x | x | 40.25 | 36.42 | 39.73 | 36.43 | 40.25 | |
| 9 | Pablo Damian Gimenez Reinoso | Argentina | F57 | 33.07 | 33.04 | 33.26 | 34.17 | 33.27 | 34.25 | 34.25 | |
| 10 | Marilson Fernandes Semedo | Cape Verde | F57 | 33.07 | 28.38 | 32.86 | x | 32.14 | 32.11 | 33.07 | PB |
| 11 | Thomas Mulbah | Liberia | F56 | x | x | x | 13.54 | x | x | 13.54 | PB |
| | Ranjeet Bhati | India | F57 | x | x | x | x | x | x | NM | |

=== F64 ===
Records

Prior to this competition, the existing world, Paralympic, and area records were as follows:

| World record | Sumit Antil (IND) | 62.88 | Dubai, United Arab Emirates | 8 Nov 2019 |
| Paralympic record | new event | – | | |

| Area | Distance (m) | Athlete | Nation |
|---|---|---|---|
| Africa | 56.24 | Márcio Fernandes | Cape Verde |
| America | 55.88 | Gerdán Fonseca | Cuba |
| Asia | 62.88 WR | Sumit Antil | India |
| Europe | 42.52 | Patrick Stoll | Switzerland |
| Oceania | 55.80 | Rory McSweeney | New Zealand |

Results

The final in this classification took place on 30 August 2021, at 19:00:

| Rank | Athlete | Nationality | Class | 1 | 2 | 3 | 4 | 5 | 6 | Best | Notes |
|---|---|---|---|---|---|---|---|---|---|---|---|
| 1st place, gold medalist(s) | Sumit Antil | India | F64 | 66.95 | 68.08 | 65.27 | 66.71 | 68.55 | x | 68.55 | WR |
| 2nd place, silver medalist(s) | Michal Burian | Australia | F44 | 60.11 | 62.86 | 61.22 | 63.15 | 61.43 | 66.29 | 66.29 | PB |
| 3rd place, bronze medalist(s) | Dulan Kodithuwakku | Sri Lanka | F44 | 62.11 | 59.81 | 63.49 | 65.61 | 61.64 | 65.05 | 65.61 | PB |
| 4 | Sandeep Chaudhary | India | F44 | 61.13 | x | 62.20 | x | x | 62.03 | 62.20 | SB |
| 5 | Francisco Jefferson de Lima | Brazil | F44 | 53.16 | 55.47 | 55.30 | 56.33 | 53.52 | 52.07 | 56.33 | |
| 6 | Edenilson Roberto Floriani | Brazil | F42 | 54.12 | 50.13 | 55.54 | x | 51.90 | x | 55.54 | SB |
| 7 | Michael Gallardo | United States | F64 | 54.72 | 51.67 | x | x | 53.32 | x | 54.72 | |
| 8 | Roman Novak | Ukraine | F44 | 52.66 | x | 53.73 | 53.00 | 54.30 | 52.73 | 54.30 | SB |
| 9 | Chaminda Sampath Hetti Arachchige | Sri Lanka | F64 | 49.94 | 48.34 | 49.21 | Did not advance | | | 49.94 | |
| 10 | Inosi Matea Bulimairewa | Fiji | F63 | x | 42.52 | 42.55 | Did not advance | | | 42.55 | SB |
