= 2021 World Para Athletics European Championships – Men's javelin throw =

The men's javelin throw events were held at the 2021 World Para Athletics European Championships in Bydgoszcz, Poland.

== Medalists ==
Event	Gold		Silver		Bronze	
F13	Daniel Pembroke (GBR)	66.75 ER	Marek Wietecki (POL)	58.76 SB	Orkhan Gasimov (AZE)	56.46
F34	Mohsen Kaedi (TUR)	31.69 ER	Thierry Cibone (FRA)	27.42 SB	Mateusz Wojnicki (POL)	25.11 PB
F37/F38	Vladyslav Bilyi (UKR)	52.29 CR	Lukasz Czarnecki (POL)	46.86	Oleksandr Doroshenko (UKR)	48.96
F41	Mathias Mester (GER)	36.31 SB	Vladimir Gaspar (CRO)	36.02 SB	Omer Faruk Ilkin (TUR)	34.34
F46	Andrius Skuja (LTU)	47.84 CR	Dzmitry Vasilevich (BLR)	43.93	Luka Baković (CRO)	43.82
F54	Manolis Stefanoudakis (GRE)	30.74 CR	Ladislav Cuchran (SVK)	29.64 PB	Ivan Revenko (RUS)	29.18 PB
F57	Mohammad Khalvandi (TUR)	45.72 ER	Hamed Heidari (AZE)	43.49	Marcelin Walico (FRA)	37.49
F64	Roman Novak (UKR)	52.33	Jonas Spudis (LTU)	51.04	Felicien Siapo (FRA)	50.65
WR world record | ER European record | CR championship record | NR national record | WL world leading | EL European leading | PB personal best | SB seasonal best

== See also ==
- List of IPC world records in athletics
