= Athletics at the 2024 Summer Paralympics – Men's javelin throw F41 =

Men's javelin throw F41 at the XVII Paralympic Games
- Venue: Stade de France, Paris
- Date: 7 September 2024
- Competitors: 6 from 6 nations
- Winning Distance: 47.32m

Medalists
1st place, gold medalist(s)		Navdeep	India
2nd place, silver medalist(s)		Sun Pengxiang	China
3rd place, bronze medalist(s)		Wildan Nukhailawi	Iraq

The Athletics at the 2024 Summer Paralympics – Men's javelin throw F41 event at the 2024 Summer Paralympics in Paris, took place on 7 September 2024.

== Classification ==
The event is open to F40 and F41 athletes who are of short stature. F40 athletes are a maximum of 130cm tall, with a maximum arm length of 59cm. F41 athletes are a maximum of 145cm tall, with a maximum arm length of 66cm.

== Records ==
Prior to the competition, the existing records were as follows:

F40 Records

World Record	Ahmed Naas (IRQ)	39.08m	(United Arab Emirates) Dubai	22 March 2022
Paralympic Record	Ahmed Naas (IRQ)	37.51m	(Japan) Tokyo	4 September 2021

F41 Records

World Record	Sun Pengxiang (CHN)	48.94m	(Japan) Kobe	25 May 2004
Paralympic Record	Sun Pengxiang (CHN)	47.13m	(Japan) Tokyo	4 September 2021

== Results ==
=== Final ===
The final in this classification took place on 7 September 2024:

Rank	Athlete	Nationality	Class	1	2	3	4	5	6	Best	Notes
1st place, gold medalist(s)	Navdeep	India	F41	x	46.39	47.32	x	46.05	x	47.32	PB
2nd place, silver medalist(s)	Sun Pengxiang	China	F41	41.75	x	44.56	43.88	44.72	41.98	44.72	
3rd place, bronze medalist(s)	Wildan Nukhailawi	Iraq	F41	38.62	40.46	39.85	x	37.77	38.97	40.46	
4	Kah Michel Ye	Ivory Coast	F55	32.88	32.96	30.39	37.42	34.87	37.69	37.69	AR
5	Ever Rene Castro Martinez	Cuba	F41	34.34	32.42	32.88	30.73	30.45	32.29	34.34	
DQ	Sadegh Beit Sayah	Iran	F41	—	—	—	—	—	—	DQ	R8.1

Notes: Sadegh Beit Sayah initially placed first, but was disqualified under Rule 8.1 (Unsporting or improper conduct). An appeal by the Iranian delegation was dismissed the following day. Iranian authorities confirmed that Sayah had displayed a religious flag during the competition, which is against World Para Athletics regulations.
