= 2019 World Para Athletics Championships – Men's javelin throw =

The men's javelin throw at the 2019 World Para Athletics Championships was held in Dubai in November 2019.

== Medalists ==
| Event | Gold | | Silver | | Bronze | |
|---|---|---|---|---|---|---|
| F13 | Behzad Azizi; Iran | 65.04 | Héctor Cabrera; Spain | 64.89 WR | Zhu Pengkai; China | 59.31 SB |
| F34 | Mauricio Valencia; Colombia | 35.25 CR | Wang Yanzhang; China | 34.34 | Hussein Khafaji; Iraq | 34.17 PB |
| F38 | Corey Anderson; Australia | 56.28 WR | Oleksandr Doroshenko; Ukraine | 54.87 AR | Reinhardt Hamman; South Africa | 54.63 AR |
| F41 | Sun Pengxiang; China | 44.35 WR | Wildan Nukhailawi; Iraq | 43.96 PB | Kovan Abdulraheem; Iraq | 42.24 SB |
| F46 | Sundar Singh Gurjar; India | 61.22 SB | Dinesh P. Herath Mudiyanselage; Sri Lanka | 60.59 | Ajeet Singh Yadav; India | 59.46 |
| F54 | Hamed Amiri; Iran | 29.77 CR | Manolis Stefanoudakis; Greece | 29.76 PB | Alexey Kuznetsov; Russia | 29.68 SB |
| F57 | Cicero Valdiran Lins Nobre; Brazil | 49.26 WR | Amanollah Papi; Iran | 47.80 | Mohamad Mohamad; Syria | 46.01 PB |
| F64 | Sandeep Chaudhary; India | 66.18 WR | Sumit Sumit; India | 62.88 WR | Roman Novak; Ukraine | 57.36 PB |
WR world record | AR area record | CR championship record | GR games record | NR national record | OR Olympic record | PB personal best | SB season best | WL world leading (in a given season)

== Detailed results ==
=== F13 ===
| Rank | Athlete | 1 | 2 | 3 | 4 | 5 | 6 | Best | Notes |
|---|---|---|---|---|---|---|---|---|---|
| 1st place, gold medalist(s) | Behzad Azizi; Iran | 62.00 | 65.04 | 64.42 | 64.72 | 64.52 | 64.30 | 65.04 | |
| 2nd place, silver medalist(s) | Héctor Cabrera; Spain | 64.89 | 63.06 | 54.15 | 58.52 | 64.29 | 60.09 | 64.89 | WR |
| 3rd place, bronze medalist(s) | Zhu Pengkai; China | 56.52 | 55.22 | 59.31 | 57.10 | 54.39 | x | 59.31 | SB |
| 4 | Uliser Aguilera Cruz; Cuba | 58.61 | 52.09 | x | 53.33 | 57.87 | 58.91 | 58.91 | |
| 5 | Marek Wietecki; Poland | 55.39 | 55.13 | 55.83 | 50.69 | 55.08 | 53.46 | 55.83 | |
| 6 | Andrei Mukha; Belarus | 50.24 | 50.15 | 47.39 | 48.61 | 45.44 | 49.68 | 50.24 | |
| 7 | Iurii Liashchuk; Russia | 49.63 | 42.89 | 42.10 | 36.37 | - | - | 49.63 | |
| 8 | Thomas Ulbricht; Germany | 45.70 | 44.02 | 41.58 | 44.62 | 43.32 | 49.60 | 49.60 | |
| 9 | Salvador Cano Garcia; Spain | 45.43 | 41.08 | 42.12 | | | | 45.43 | |
| 10 | Vladimir Butucea; Moldova | 36.58 | 34.25 | 33.90 | | | | 36.58 | |
| 11 | Octavian Vasile Tucaliuc; Romania | 34.19 | x | x | | | | 34.19 | |
| | Hermanus Blom; South Africa | | | | | | | | DNS |

== See also ==
- List of IPC world records in athletics
