= Phongsavanh =

Phongsavanh is a surname. Notable people with the surname include:

- Justin Phongsavanh (born 1997), American Paralympic athlete
- Vongdeuane Phongsavanh (born 1957), Laotian middle-distance runner
