= Sumit Antil =

Indian javelin thrower

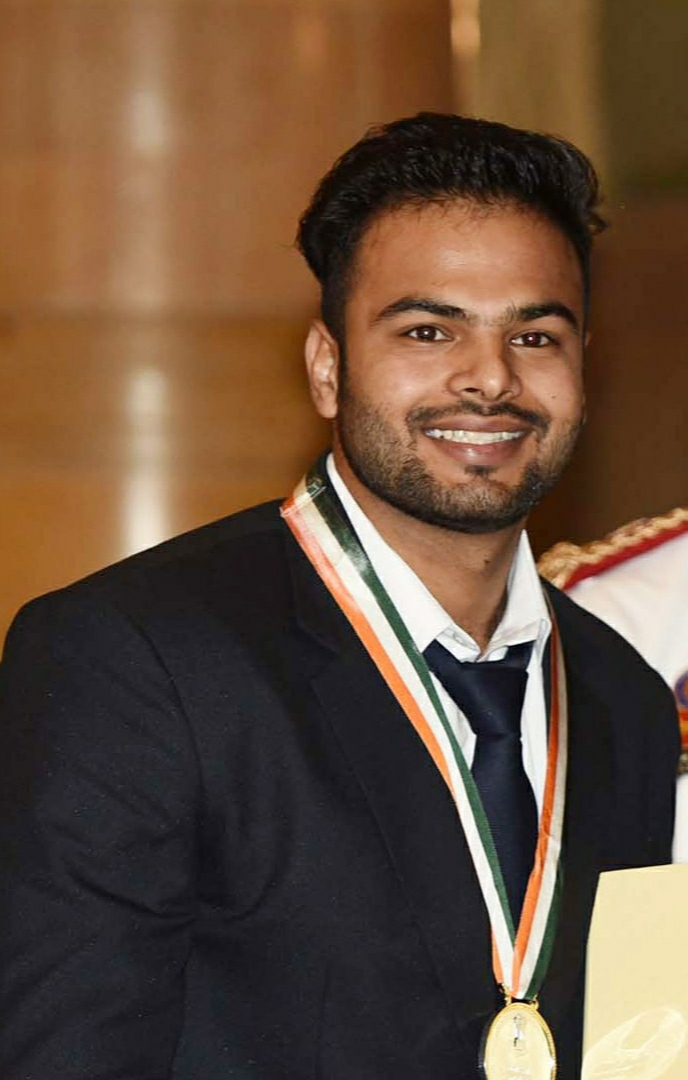
- Antil in 2021

Personal information
- Born: 7 June 1998 (age 28) Sonipat, Haryana, India
- Education: Ramjas College

Sport
- Sport: Para-athletics
- Disability class: F64
- Event: Javelin throw
- Coached by: Arun Kumar; Naval Singh

Achievements and titles
- Paralympic finals: (gold) (2020, 2024)
- World finals: (gold) (2023, 2024, 2025); (silver) (2019)
- Regional finals: (gold) (2022)
- Personal bests: 74.82 m WR (2026); 73.29 m AR (2023); 71.37 m CR (2025); 70.59 m PR (2024)
Medal record
Men's para-athletics
Representing India
Paralympic Games
Gold medal – first place	2020 Tokyo	Javelin throw F64
Gold medal – first place	2024 Paris	Javelin throw F64
World Championships
Gold medal – first place	2023 Paris	Javelin throw F64
Gold medal – first place	2024 Kobe	Javelin throw F64
Gold medal – first place	2025 New Delhi	Javelin throw F64
Silver medal – second place	2019 Dubai	Javelin throw F64
Asian Para Games
Gold medal – first place	2022 Hangzhou	Javelin throw F64
Gold medal – first place	2026 Aichi-Nagoya	Javelin throw F64

Sumit Antil (born 7 June 1998) is Indian para javelin thrower. He is the reigning Paralympic, World and Asian champion in the men's javelin throw F64 category. He won gold medals at the 2020 and 2024 Paralympics. He is a three-time gold medalist at the World Championships and also has won the gold medal at the 2022 Asian Para Games. He is also a seven-time world record holder.

== Early life ==
=== Family ===
Antil was born in Khewra, Sonipat, Haryana, to Niramala Devi and Ram Kumar Antil. His father, who was employed in the Indian Air Force, died when he was seven. His mother motivated him to take up sports after his accident. He has three sisters, Kiran, Sushila & Renu.

=== Accident ===
He wanted to pursue a career in wrestling and join the Indian Army. In 2015, when he was 17, his motorbike was hit by a speeding truck while he was returning home from a tuition class. As a result, his left leg was amputated and he had to abandon his dream of becoming a wrestler.

=== Education and athletics ===
After completing his secondary education at Dev Rishi Senior Secondary School, Sonipat, he was introduced to para-athletics by another para-athlete, Rajkumar, while he was pursuing his B.Com. from Ramjas College of Delhi University.

== Career ==
In 2017, Antil started training under Nitin Jaiswal in Delhi, and competed in various National and International platforms. He began competing at javelin on the National circuit and GoSports inducted him into the Para Champions Programme in 2019.

In 2019, at the World Para Athletics Grand Prix in Italy, he broke the world record in the F64 category en route to winning the silver medal in the Combined Event. He then won the silver medal at World Para Athletics Championships, Dubai, 2019 and in the process broke his own world record in the F64 category.

On 30 August 2021, Antil won a gold medal with a World Record throw of 68.55m in javelin throw F64 at 2020 Summer Paralympics. Competing in the Indian Open National Para Athletics Championships, Antil rewrote the world record for the fourth time in a year with a throw of 68.62 meters, breaking his own mark of 68.55 meters. Three of these marks were astonishingly set during the final of the Tokyo Paralympics en route to winning gold. On 2 September 2024, Antil won the gold medal again with the new Paralympic Record throw of 70.59m in Javelin throw F64 at 2024 Summer Paralympics.

In 2025, Antil participated in the 2025 World Para Athletics Championships hosted in New Delhi, where he broke the Championship record (also set by him) with a throw of 71.37 meters.

In January 2026, Antil clinched the gold medal in the F64 category at the World Para Athletics Grand Prix in New Delhi. Later, in May 2026, he broke his own world record with a throw of 74.82 meters at the Indian Open National Para Athletics Championships.

== Awards ==
- 2021 – Khel Ratna Award, highest sporting honour of India.
- 2022 – Padma Shri Award, fourth-highest civilian award of the Republic of India.
- 2024 - Sportstar Aces Awards 2024: Sportsman of the Year (parasports).
- 2024 - Forbes India 30 Under 30 2024.
- 2024: Para Athlete of the Year Male Indian Sports Honours

== See also ==
- India at the 2020 Summer Paralympics
- Athletics in India
