= 2024 World Para Athletics Championships – Men's javelin throw =

The men's javelin throw events at the 2024 World Para Athletics Championships were held in Kobe, Japan.

== Medalists ==
Event	Gold	Silver	Bronze
F13	Dan Pembroke; Great Britain	Ali Pirouj; Iran	Sajad Nikparast; Iran
F34	Saeid Afrooz; Iran	Mauricio Valencia; Colombia	Diego Meneses; Colombia
F38	José Lemos; Colombia	Luis Fernando Lucumí Villegas; Colombia	An Dongquan; China
F41	Sun Pengxiang; China	Sadegh Beit Sayah; Iran	Navdeep Singh; India
F46	Guillermo Varona; Cuba	Rinku Hooda; India	Ajeet Singh; India
F54	Edgar Ulises Fuentes Yanez; Mexico	Manolis Stefanoudakis; Greece	Sergei Makhov; Neutral Paralympic Athletes (NPA)
F57	Cícero Valdiran Lins Nobre; Brazil	Mohammad Khalvandi; Turkey	Fauzi Purwolaksono; Indonesia
F64	Sumit Antil; India	Dulan Kodithuwakku; Sri Lanka	Sandeep Chaudhary; India
