= Yorkinbek Odilov =

Uzbekistani Paralympic athlete (born 2000)

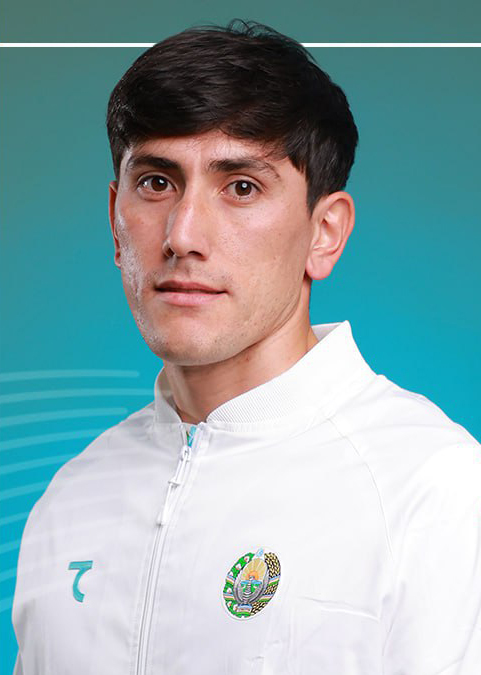

Personal information
- Nationality: Uzbekistani
- Born: 28 June 2000 (age 26) Fergana, Uzbekistan

Sport
- Sport: Para-athletics
- Disability class: F57
- Event(s): Discus throw shot put javelin throw
Medal record
Men's para-athletics
Representing Uzbekistan
Paralympic Games
Gold medal – first place	2024 Paris	Javelin throw F57
World Championships
Silver medal – second place	2023 Paris	Javelin throw F57
Silver medal – second place	2025 New Delhi	Javelin throw F57
Asian Para Games
Silver medal – second place	2022 Hangzhou	Javelin throw F57
Islamic Solidarity Games
Gold medal – first place	2025 Riyadh	Discus Throw F57

Yorkinbek Odilov (born 28 June 2000) is an Uzbekistani para-athlete, competing in F57 throwing events. He represented Uzbekistan at the 2024 Summer Paralympics and won a gold medal in javelin throw.

== Career ==
Odilov competed in the 2020 Summer Paralympics, where he competed in the men's javelin throw and men's shot put events.

Odilov represented Uzbekistan at the 2023 World Para Athletics Championships and won a silver medal in the javelin throw event. Three months later, at the rescheduled 2022 Asian Games, he won the silver medal in javelin throw.

Odilov again represented Uzbekistan at the 2024 World Para Athletics Championships and finished in seventh and fourth in the shot put and javelin throw events respectively. He then represented Uzbekistan at the 2024 Summer Paralympics and won a gold medal in the javelin throw event.

Odilov competed at the 2025 World Para Athletics Championships, where he won the silver medal in the javelin throw. He also competed in the 2025 Islamic Solidarity Games, where he won the gold medal in the discus throw F57 event.
