= José Lemos (athlete) =

Colombian athlete (born 1991)

José Gregorio Lemos
Personal information
- Full name: José Gregorio Lemos Rivas
- Born: 1 June 1991 (age 35) Pradera, Valle del Cauca, Colombia

Sport
- Country: Colombia
- Sport: Para-athletics; Athletics
- Disability: Cerebral palsy
- Disability class: F37; T38/F38
- Events: 100 metres; Long jump; Shot put; Javelin throw; Decathlon
Medal record
Representing Colombia
Men's para-athletics
Event	1st	2nd	3rd
Paralympic Games	2	0	2
World Championships	5	1	1
Parapan American Games	1	0	0
Total	8	1	3
Paralympic Games
Gold medal – first place	2020 Tokyo	Javelin throw F38
Gold medal – first place	2024 Paris	Javelin throw F38
Bronze medal – third place	2020 Tokyo	Long jump T38
Bronze medal – third place	2024 Paris	Long jump T38
World Championships
Gold medal – first place	2023 Paris	Shot put F38
Gold medal – first place	2023 Paris	Javelin throw F38
Gold medal – first place	2024 Kobe	Shot put F38
Gold medal – first place	2024 Kobe	Javelin throw F38
Gold medal – first place	2025 New Delhi	Javelin throw F38
Silver medal – second place	2025 New Delhi	Shot put F38
Bronze medal – third place	2023 Paris	Long jump T38
Parapan American Games
Gold medal – first place	2023 Santiago	Javelin throw F37/38
Men's athletics
Event	1st	2nd	3rd
CAC Games	0	1	0
South American Games	0	1	0
South American Championships	0	0	1
Bolivarian Games	1	0	1
South American U20 Championships	0	1	0
South American U18 Championships	0	1	0
Total	1	4	2
Central American and Caribbean Games
Silver medal – second place	2018 Barranquilla	Decathlon
South American Games
Silver medal – second place	2018 Cochabamba	Decathlon
South American Championships
Bronze medal – third place	2017 Asunción	Decathlon
Bolivarian Games
Gold medal – first place	2017 Santa Marta	Decathlon
Bronze medal – third place	2013 Trujillo	Decathlon
South American U20 Championships
Silver medal – second place	2009 São Paulo/Port of Spain	Decathlon
South American U18 Championships
Silver medal – second place	2008 Lima	Javelin throw
- Updated on 1 October 2025

José Gregorio Lemos Rivas (born 4 June 1991) is a Colombian athlete with cerebral palsy.

== Career ==
He represented Colombia at the 2020 Summer Paralympics in Tokyo, Japan and won a gold medal in the men's javelin throw F38 event.

== Personal life ==
He is the younger brother of Sandra Lemos.
