= Luis Fernando Lucumí Villegas =

Colombian Paralympic athlete (born 1998)

Personal information
- Born: 2 February 1998 (age 28)

Sport
- Country: Colombia
- Sport: Para-athletics
- Disability: Cerebral palsy
- Disability class: T38/F38
- Events: 100 metres; Javelin throw; Shot put
Medal record
Representing Colombia
Men's para-athletics
Event	1st	2nd	3rd
Paralympic Games	0	1	1
World Championships	0	3	0
Parapan American Games	1	0	1
Total	1	4	2
Paralympic Games
Silver medal – second place	2016 Rio de Janeiro	Javelin throw F38
Bronze medal – third place	2020 Tokyo	Javelin throw F38
World Championships
Silver medal – second place	2023 Paris	Javelin throw F38
Silver medal – second place	2024 Kobe	Javelin throw F38
Silver medal – second place	2025 New Delhi	Javelin throw F38
Parapan American Games
Gold medal – first place	2019 Lima	Javelin throw F37/38
Bronze medal – third place	2023 Santiago	Javelin throw F37/38

Luis Fernando Lucumí Villegas (born 2 February 1998) is a Colombian Paralympic athlete with cerebral palsy. He represented Colombia at the 2016 Summer Paralympics in Rio de Janeiro, Brazil and he won the silver medal in the men's javelin throw F38 event. He won the bronze medal in the men's javelin throw F38 event at the 2020 Summer Paralympics in Tokyo, Japan.

== Career ==
At the 2016 Summer Paralympics in Rio de Janeiro, Brazil, he also competed in the men's 100 metres T38 event without winning a medal.

In 2019, he qualified to represent Colombia at the 2020 Summer Paralympics after finishing in 4th place in the men's javelin throw F38 event at the 2019 World Para Athletics Championships held in Dubai, United Arab Emirates.

== Achievements ==
Year	Competition	Venue	Position	Event	Notes
Representing Colombia
2016	Summer Paralympics	Rio de Janeiro, Brazil	2nd	Javelin throw	49.19 m
2019	Parapan American Games	Lima, Peru	1st	Javelin throw	
2020	Summer Paralympics	Tokyo, Japan	3rd	Javelin throw	54.63 m
2023	World Para Athletics Championships	Paris, France	2nd	Javelin throw	53.28 m
2023	Parapan American Games	Santiago, Chile	3rd	Javelin throw	
