= Saeid Afrooz =

Iranian Paralympic athlete (born 1990)

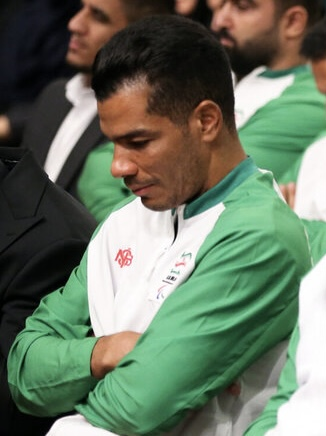

Personal information
- Nationality: Iranian
- Born: 30 December 1990 (age 35) Jiroft, Iran

Sport
- Sport: Paralympic athletics
Medal record
Men's para-athletics
Representing Iran
Paralympic Games
Gold medal – first place	2020 Tokyo	Javelin throw F34
Gold medal – first place	2024 Paris	Javelin throw F34
World Championships
Gold medal – first place	2023 Paris	Javelin throw F34
Gold medal – first place	2024 Kobe	Javelin throw F34
Gold medal – first place	2025 New Delhi	Javelin throw F34
Asian Para Games
Gold medal – first place	2022 Hangzhou	Javelin throw F33/34
Gold medal – first place	2026 Aichi–Nagoya	Javelin throw F33/34

Saeid Afrooz (Persian: سعید افروز, born 13 December 1990) is an Iranian para-athlete. He represented Iran at the 2020 and 2024 Summer Paralympics.

== Career ==
He represented Iran at the 2020 Summer Paralympics and won a gold medal in the javelin throw F34 event. He again won a gold medal at the 2024 Summer Paralympics in the javelin throw F34 event with a Paralympic record throw of 41.16 metres.

In October 2026, he competed at the 2026 Asian Para Games and won a gold medal in the javelin throw F33/34 event with a world record throw of 42.58 metres.
