= Guillermo Varona =

Cuban para javelin thrower

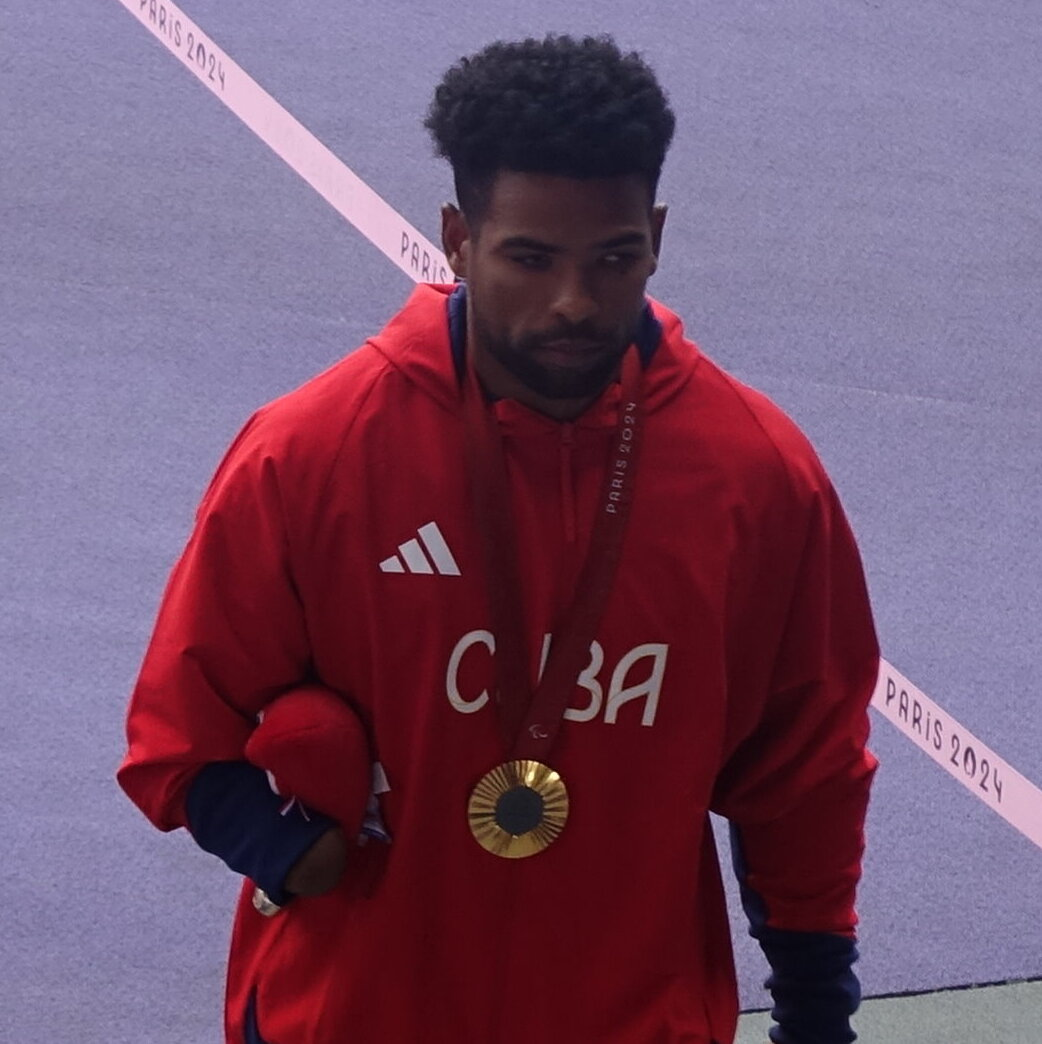
- Varona at the 2024 Summer Paralympics

Personal information
- Nationality: Cuban
- Born: Guillermo Varona González; 1 August 1995 (age 30)

Sport
- Country: Cuba
- Sport: Para-athletics
- Event(s): Javelin throw shot put

Achievements and titles
- Paralympic finals: 2024 Paris: 1st
Medal record
Men's para-athletics
Representing Cuba
Paralympic Games
Gold medal – first place	2024 Paris	Javelin throw F46
World Championships
Gold medal – first place	2024 Kobe	Javelin throw F46
Bronze medal – third place	2025 New Delhi	Javelin throw F46
Parapan American Games
Gold medal – first place	2019 Lima	Javelin throw F46
Gold medal – first place	2023 Santiago	Javelin throw F46

Guillermo Varona González (Note: In this Spanish name, the first or paternal surname is Varona and the second or maternal family name is González.) (born 1 August 1995) is a Cuban para-athlete javelin thrower who competes in the F46 category. He is a gold medalist at the 2023 Parapan American Games, 2024 World Para Athletics Championships, and 2024 Summer Paralympics. He has also competed in the shot put.

== Career ==
At the 2019 Parapan American Games, Varona won the gold medal in the F48 category and also competed in the shot put. He then competed in the 2020 Summer Paralympics, where he finished in fourth place in the javelin throw. Varela returned to the Parapan American Games in 2023 Parapan, in the F48 category, winning a gold medal setting a record in the games in the process. In May 2024, he won a gold medal in the men's F46 javelin throw event at the World Para Athletics Championship in Kobe, Japan. At the 2024 Summer Paralympics, he won the gold medal in the javelin throw F46 event.

== Personal life ==
Varona is in a relationship with para taekwondo practitioner Lilisbet Rodriguez and the two have a son.
