= Ali Pirouj =

Iranian Paralympic athlete (born 1998)

Personal information
- Nationality: Iranian
- Born: 22 January 1998 (age 28)

Sport
- Sport: Paralympic athletics
- Event: Javelin throw
Medal record
Men's para-athletics
Representing Iran
Paralympic Games
Silver medal – second place	2020 Tokyo	Javelin throw F13
Silver medal – second place	2024 Paris	Javelin throw F13
World Championships
Silver medal – second place	2023 Paris	Javelin throw F13
Silver medal – second place	2024 Kobe	Javelin throw F13

Ali Pirouj (Persian: علی پیروج, born 22 January 1998) is an Iranian Paralympic athlete who specializes in javelin throw.

== Career ==
Pirouj represented Iran at the 2020 Summer Paralympics in Tokyo, Japan and won the silver medal in the men's javelin throw F13 event.
