= Dulan Kodithuwakku =

Paralympian track and field athlete from Sri Lanka

Personal information
- Full name: Samitha Dulan Kodithuwakku
- Born: 10 July 1990 (age 35) Deniyaya, Southern Province, Sri Lanka

Sport
- Country: Sri Lanka
- Sport: Paralympic athletics
- Disability class: F64

Achievements and titles
- Paralympic finals: 2020 Tokyo
Medal record
Men's para-athletics
Representing Sri Lanka
Paralympic Games
Silver medal – second place	2024 Paris	Javelin throw F64
Bronze medal – third place	2020 Tokyo	Javelin throw F64
World Championships
Silver medal – second place	2024 Kobe	Javelin throw F64
Bronze medal – third place	2023 Paris	Javelin throw F64

Samitha Dulan Kodithuwakku (born 10 July 1990), also known as Samitha Dulan, is a Sri Lankan Paralympic track and field athlete. He made his first Paralympic appearance representing Sri Lanka at the 2020 Summer Paralympics.

== Personal life ==
Samitha Dulan was born and raised up in Deniyaya, Southern Province. He pursued his primary and secondary education at the Deniyaya Central College and Rahula College.

Dulan suffered an impairment in his right leg after a tragic motorbike accident and took up para sports in 2017. He serves as a corporal of Sri Lanka Military Police and represents Military Police Sports Club. He joined the Sri Lanka Army on 5 December 2009.

== Career ==
Dulan's fourth-place finish in the men's F44 category of the javelin throw event at the 2019 World Para Athletics Championships in Dubai secured his berth in order to obtain direct slot to compete at the 2020 Summer Paralympics.

Dulan claimed bronze medal in the men's javelin throw F64 category at the 2020 Tokyo Paralympics. He won Sri Lanka's second medal at the 2020 Summer Paralympics and noticeably his medal achievement was Sri Lanka's second medal in a single day on 30 August 2021.

In May 2024, he set a new world record in men's F44 classification javelin throw event during the 2024 World Para Athletics Championships after clearing a record distance of 66.49 meters in his first attempt in the final. He went onto claim a silver medal during his world record performance at the 2024 World Para Athletics Championships as he emulated his first attempt with further impressive clearing of 63.96m, 53.91m, 59.81m, 56.51m and 65.01m in the next five attempts.

He made his second Paralympic appearance representing Sri Lanka at the 2024 Summer Paralympics. In September 2024, he claimed silver medal in the men's F64 category of men's javelin throw event, where he also coincidentally shattered his own world record in men's F44 classification after clearing a distance of 67.03 meters. He cleared distances during the men's F64 javelin throw final with throws of 63.14m, 63.61m, 55.01m, 63.73m and his last throw was measured to be 67.03 meters, which eventually sealed him a silver medal and as well as the coveted world record holder title.
