= An Dongquan =

Chinese para-athlete (born 1987)

Personal information
- Born: 18 February 1987 (age 39) Tangshan, China

Sport
- Sport: Para-athletics
- Disability class: F38
- Event: javelin throw
Medal record
Para-athletics
Representing China
Paralympic Games
Bronze medal – third place	2024 Paris	Javelin throw F38
World Championships
Bronze medal – third place	2024 Kobe	Javelin throw F38
Asian Para Games
Bronze medal – third place	2022 Hangzhou	Javelin throw F37/38

An Dongquan (born 18 February 1987) is a Chinese para-athlete who specializes in javelin throw.

== Career ==
An represented China at the 2016 Summer Paralympics in javelin throw and finished in fourth place. He again represented China at the 2024 Summer Paralympics and won a bronze medal in the javelin throw F38 event.
