= Diego Meneses =

Colombian Paralympic athlete (born 1998)

Personal information
- Full name: Diego Fernando Meneses Medina
- Nationality: Colombian
- Born: 7 July 1998 (age 27) Yumbo, Colombia

Sport
- Sport: Para-athletics
- Disability class: F32; F33; F34
- Events: Javelin throw; Shot put
Medal record
Representing Colombia
Men's para-athletics
Event	1st	2nd	3rd
Paralympic Games	0	0	2
World Championships	0	1	2
Parapan American Games	0	3	0
Total	0	4	4
Paralympic Games
Bronze medal – third place	2020 Tokyo	Javelin throw F34
Bronze medal – third place	2024 Paris	Javelin throw F34
World Championships
Silver medal – second place	2025 New Delhi	Javelin throw F34
Bronze medal – third place	2023 Paris	Javelin throw F34
Bronze medal – third place	2024 Kobe	Javelin throw F34
Parapan American Games
Silver medal – second place	2019 Lima	Shot put F32/33/34
Silver medal – second place	2019 Lima	Javelin throw F34
Silver medal – second place	2023 Santiago	Shot put F32/33/34

Diego Fernando Meneses Medina (born 7 July 1998) is a Colombian para-athlete specializing in throwing events: javelin throw and shot put.

== Career ==
In May 2024, he competed at the 2024 World Para Athletics Championships and won a bronze medal in the javelin throw F34 event. He then represented Colombia at the 2024 Summer Paralympics and won a bronze medal in the javelin throw F34 event.
