= Vladyslav Bilyi =

Ukrainian Paralympic athlete (born 1997)

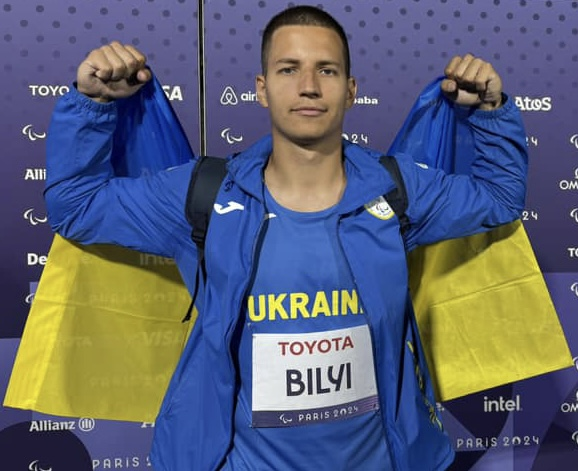
- Bilyi at the 2024 Summer Paralympics

Personal information
- Nickname: Vlad
- Nationality: Ukrainian
- Born: 26 November 1997 (age 28) Ukraine

Sport
- Sport: Paralympic athletics
- Disability class: F38
- Event: javelin throw
- Coached by: Iryna Kulykova; Tetiana Zakharovska
Medal record
Men's para-athletics
Representing Ukraine
Paralympic Games
Silver medal – second place	2020 Tokyo	Javelin throw F38
Silver medal – second place	2024 Paris	Javelin throw F38
World Championships
Bronze medal – third place	2023 Paris	Javelin throw F38
Bronze medal – third place	2025 New Delhi	Javelin throw F38 {{MedalCompetition European Championships}}
Gold medal – first place	2021 Bydgoszcz	Javelin throw F37/F38

Vladyslav Bilyi (born 26 November 1997) is a Ukrainian Paralympic athlete specializing in javelin throw. He represented Ukraine at the 2020 and 2024 Summer Paralympics.

== Career ==
Bilyi represented Ukraine in the javelin throw F38 event at the 2020 Summer Paralympics and won a silver medal.
