= Michal Burian =

Australian paralympic javelin thrower

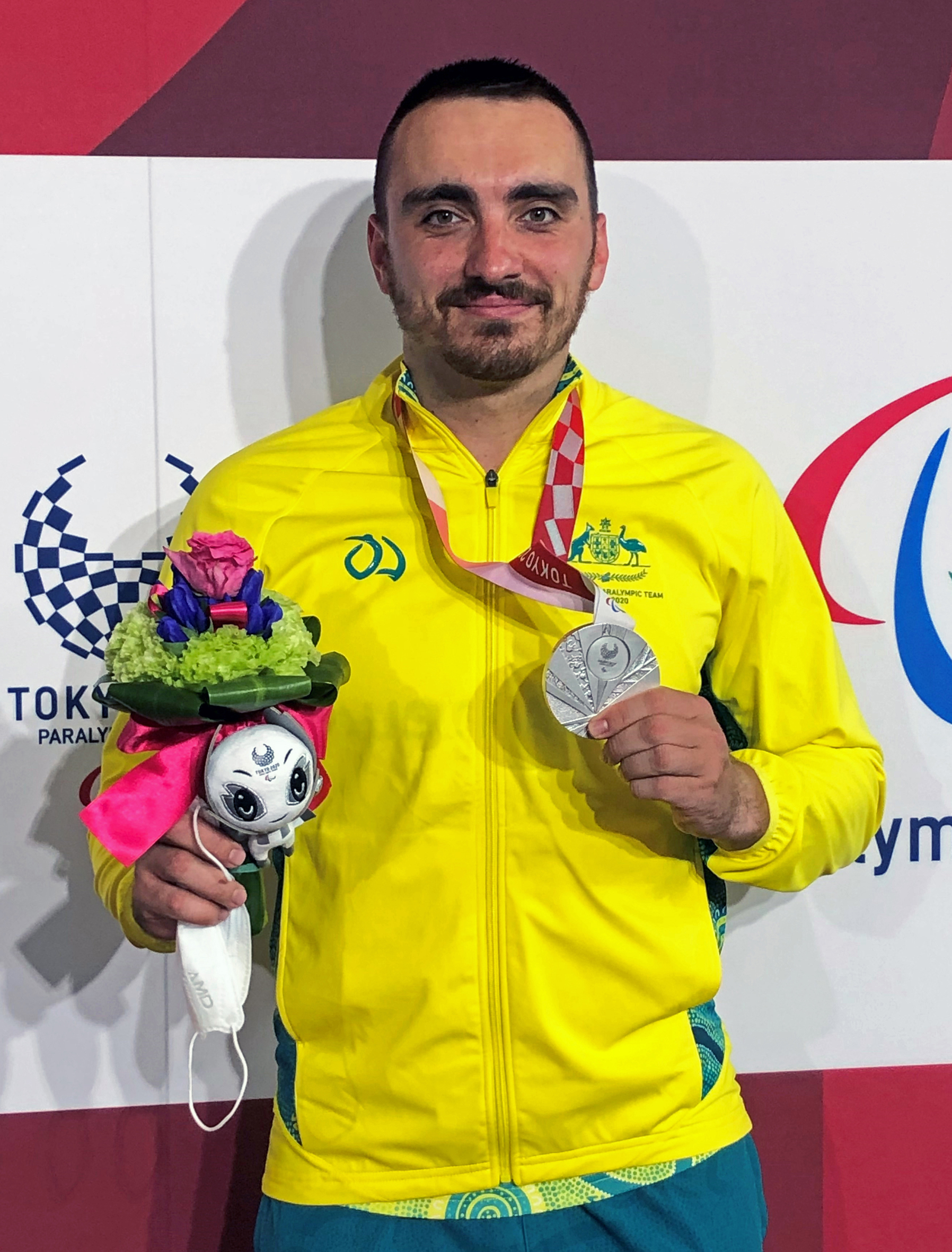

Personal information
- Nationality: Czech | Australian
- Born: 27 June 1992 (age 34) Czech Republic
- Height: 179 cm (5 ft 10 in)
- Weight: 92 kg (203 lb; 14 st 7 lb)

Sport
- Country: Australia
- Sport: Para-athletics
- Position: javelin thrower
- Disability: Club foot
- Disability class: F44
- Event: Javelin throw
- League: Athletics Australia
- Club: Sandringham Athletics Club
- Coached by: Dale Stevenson

Achievements and titles
- Paralympic finals: Tokyo 2020
- World finals: Paris 2023
- National finals: Australian championship 2022,2021,2020,2019
- Personal best: 66.29m
Medal record
Men's para-athletics
Representing Australia
Paralympic Games
Silver medal – second place	2020 Tokyo	Javelin throw F64
Bronze medal – third place	2024 Paris	Javelin throw F64
World Championships
Silver medal – second place	2023 Paris	Javelin throw F64

Michal Burian (born 27 June 1992) is a Czech-born Australian Paralympic javelin thrower. He won a silver medal at the 2020 Summer Paralympics. Two years later, he secured another silver medal at the 2023 World Para Athletics Championships. In both competitions, his achievements were clinched during the final round with a clutch throw, proving Burian's ability to perform under pressure.

== Personal ==
Burian was born with club foot and grew up in the Czech Republic. He arrived in Australia in 2012, on a six-month visa and speaking little English. He soon decided to settle in Australia permanently, and has since become an Australian citizen. He has completed a Diploma in Sport and Recreation Management. As of 2021, he lives in Melbourne and works as a project coordinator.

== Athletics ==
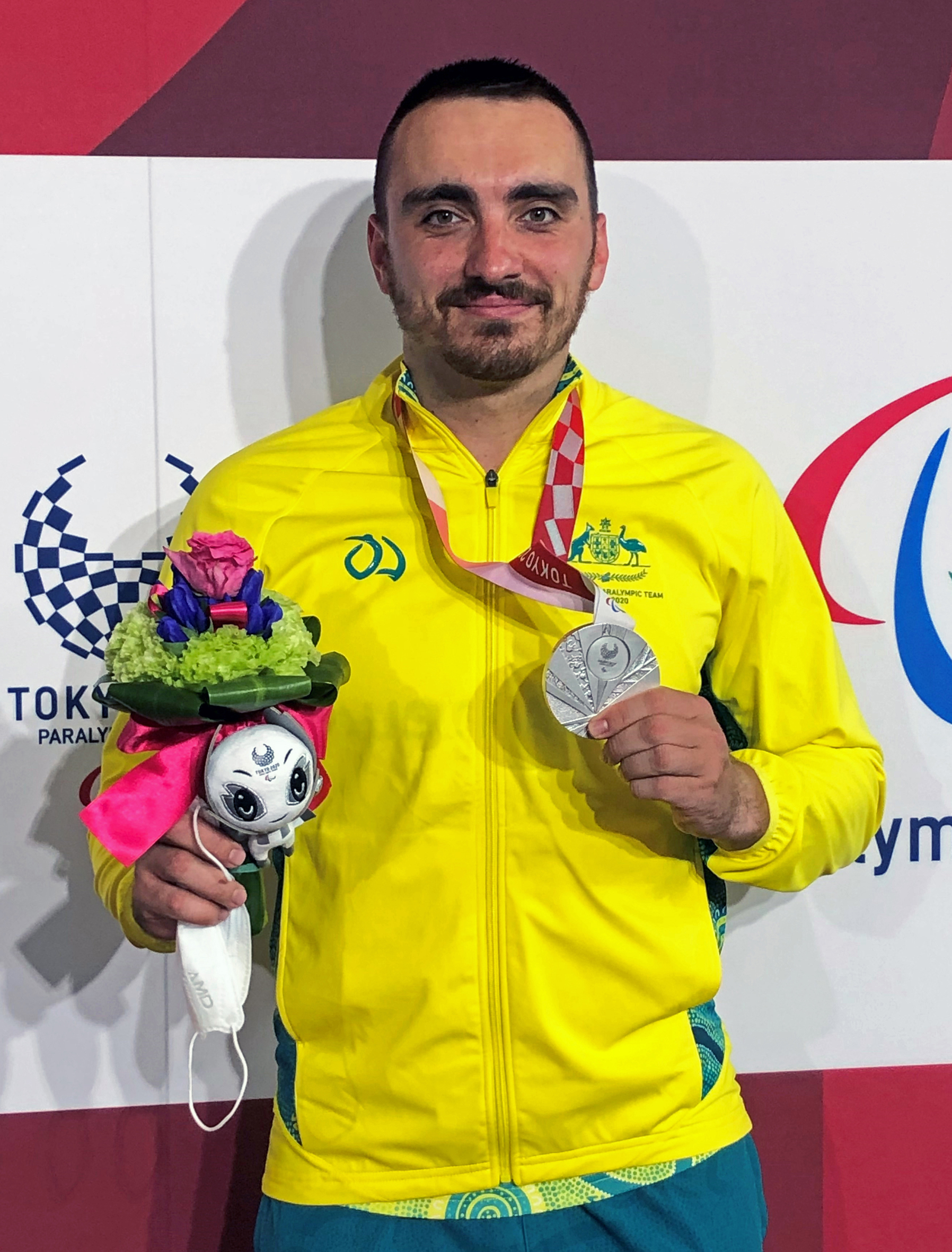
Burian with silver medal at the 2020 Tokyo Paralympics

As a teen in the Czech Republic, Burian watched Olympic javelin champion and world record holder Jan Železný throwing at his local club. By the age of 18, he was a member of the (able-bodied) Czech junior national team. He was then told he should not continue in sport due to his impairment.

Following his arrival in Australia, Burian joined Sandringham Athletics Club. He was classified as an F44 para-athlete in 2020. As of 1 July 2021, Burian holds the Australian record for Men's javelin F44, with a distance of 61.24m.

At the 2020 Tokyo Paralympics, he won the silver medal in the Men's Javelin F64 with a personal best throw of 66.29m and holds the new world record in the F44 category.

Burian won the silver medal at the Men's Javelin F64 at the 2023 World Para Athletics Championships in Paris with a throw of 65.21m in sixth round.

He competed at the 2024 Summer Paralympics, Paris, France - his second Games where he won the bronze medal in Men's Javelin F64. At the 2025 World Para Athletics Championships in New Delhi, he finished sixth in the Men's Javelin F64 after battling a calf injury.

In 2024, he was awarded a Victorian Institute of Sport Coach Award.
