= Cícero Nobre =

Brazilian Paralympic athlete (born 1992)

Personal information
- Born: Cícero Valdiran Lins Nobre; 23 June 1992 (age 34) Aguiar, Paraíba, Brazil

Sport
- Country: Brazil
- Sport: Para athletics
- Disability class: F57
- Event: Javelin throw
Medal record
Men's para athletics
Representing Brazil
Paralympic Games
Bronze medal – third place	2020 Tokyo	Javelin throw F57
Bronze medal – third place	2024 Paris	Javelin throw F57
World Championships
Gold medal – first place	2019 Dubai	Javelin throw F57
Gold medal – first place	2024 Kobe	Javelin throw F57
Parapan American Games
Gold medal – first place	2019 Lima	Javelin throw F57

Cícero Valdiran Lins Nobre (born 23 June 1992) is a Brazilian Paralympic athlete. He won the bronze medal in the men's javelin throw F57 event at the 2020 Summer Paralympics held in Tokyo, Japan.
