= Mohammad Khalvandi =

Iranian Paralympic athlete

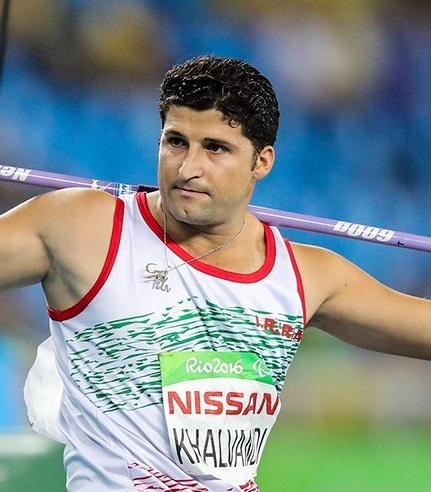
- Khalvandi at the 2016 Paralympics Men's F57/58 javelin throw.

Personal information
- Native name: محمد خالوندی
- Born: 11 January 1990 (age 36) Kermanshah, Iran

Sport
- Country: Turkey
- Sport: Athletics
- Disability class: F57

Achievements and titles
- Paralympic finals: London 2012: Javelin throw
Medal record
Men's para-athletics
Representing Turkey
Paralympic Games
Silver medal – second place	2024 Paris	Javelin throw F57
World Championships
Gold medal – first place	2023 Paris	Javelin throw F57
Gold medal – first place	2025 New Delhi	Javelin throw F57
Silver medal – second place	2024 Kobe	Javelin throw F57
European Championships
Gold medal – first place	2021 Bydgoszcz	Javelin throw F57
Islamic Solidarity Games
Silver medal – second place	2025 Riyadh	Shot put F57
Representing Iran
Paralympic Games
Gold medal – first place	2012 London	Javelin throw F57
Gold medal – first place	2016 Rio de Janeiro	Javelin throw F57
World Championships
Gold medal – first place	2013 Lyon	Javelin throw F57
Gold medal – first place	2015 Doha	Javelin throw F57
Silver medal – second place	2017 London	Javelin throw F57
Asian Para Games
Bronze medal – third place	2018 Jakarta	Javelin throw F56–57

Mohammad Khalvandi (Persian: محمد خالوندی; born 11 January 1990) is an Iranian-born Turkish Paralympian athlete who competes in the disability class F58 of javelin throw event. He is Paralympics, world and European champion, and world and European record holder.

== Spor career ==
=== In Iran ===
At the 2012 Paralympics, Khalvandi set a World Record for the F58 class with a throw of 50.98 m as he won gold in the combined F57/58 category. Khalvandi also won the combined F57/58 javelin 2013 World title.

=== In Turkey ===
Khalvandi is supported by the Mersin Provincial Administration of Youth and Sports, where he is coached by Zübeyde Yıldız.

Competing for Turkey, he captured the gold medal in the javelin throw F57 event at the 2021 World Para Athletics European Championships in Bydgoszcz, Poland. With his throw of 45.72 m, improved the European record of 38.55 m by Marcelin Walico from France.

He claimed the gold medal with his throw of 49.98 m at the 2023 World Para Athletics Championships in Paris, France. He so received a quota to represent Turkey at the 2024 Paris Paralympics.

At the international-level Para Athletics Olympic Trial Competition, organized by the Turkish Athletic Federation and held in Mersin, he set a new world record on 20 February 2024 in the javelin throw F57 event with 51.60 m replacing the former world record of 51.42 m by Hamed Heidari from Azerbaijan.

Khalvandi took the silver medal in the javelin throw F57 event with 49.80 m at the 2024 World Para Athletics Championships in Kobe, Japan.

He won the silver medal in the javelin throw F57 event with 49.97 m at the 2024 Summer Paralympics.

== Personal life ==
Mohammed Khalvandi was born in Kermanshah, Iran on 11 January 1990.

Upon a request for cooperation from a Turkish club in 2017, he decided end 2019 to emigrate and compete for Turkey.

After his immigration to Turkey, he settled down in Mersin.
