= Édgar Ulises Fuentes Yáñez =

Mexican Paralympic athlete (born 1994)

Édgar Ulises Fuentes
Personal information
- Full name: Édgar Ulises Fuentes Yáñez
- Born: 21 April 1994 (age 32) Chihuahua City, Mexico

Sport
- Country: Mexico
- Sport: Para-athletics
- Disability class: F54
- Event: javelin throw
Medal record
Men's para-athletics
Representing Mexico
Paralympic Games
| Silver medal – second place | 2024 Paris | Javelin throw F54 |
World Championships
| Gold medal – first place | 2024 Kobe | Javelin throw F54 |

Édgar Ulises Fuentes Yáñez (Note: In this Spanish name, the first or paternal surname is Fuentes and the second or maternal family name is Yáñez.) (born 21 April 1994) is a Mexican para-athlete specializing in javelin throw.

== Career ==
In May 2024, he competed at the 2024 World Para Athletics Championships and won a gold medal in the javelin throw F54 event with a Championships record throw of 30.25 metres. He then represented Mexico at the 2024 Summer Paralympics and won a silver medal in the javelin throw F54 event.
