= Dan Pembroke =

British Paralympic athlete

Dan Pembroke MBE
Personal information
- Nationality: British

Sport
- Sport: Paralympic athletics
- Event: Javelin throw
Medal record
Men's para-athletics
Representing Great Britain
Paralympic Games
Gold medal – first place	2020 Tokyo	Javelin throw F13
Gold medal – first place	2024 Paris	Javelin throw F13
World Championships
Gold medal – first place	2023 Paris	Javelin throw F13
Gold medal – first place	2024 Kobe	Javelin throw F13
Gold medal – first place	2025 New Delhi	Javelin throw F13

Daniel Dean Pembroke (born 16 July 1991) is a British athlete who specialises in the Javelin throw.

== Career ==
As a junior athlete, he competed for Great Britain and Northern Ireland in three age-group championships. His highest placing was 11th in the javelin at the 2011 IAAF World U20 Championships in Moncton, Canada. An elbow injury ended his chances of qualifying for the Olympic Games in 2012, so he took a break from the sport until 2019.

He was diagnosed with RP (Retinitis pigmentosa) when he was six and his eyesight became further impaired during his twenties.

In 2021 he accepted a place on the British Paralympic World Class Programme (WCP). He went on to win Gold in the T13 javelin throw at the 2020 Summer Paralympics in Tokyo. In doing so he threw a new Paralympic record of 69.52 meters with his third attempt.

Pembroke was appointed Member of the Order of the British Empire (MBE) in the 2022 New Year Honours for services to athletics.

At the 2023 World Para Athletics Championships, he won the gold medal in the T13 Javelin Throw, with a throw of 70.50 metres.

At the 2024 World Para Athletics Championships, he won the gold medal in the T13 Javelin with a throw of 66.96 metres.

At the 2024 Summer Paralympics, Dan retained his Paralympic title with a throw of 74.49 metres which was a new world record in that class.

At the 2025 World Para Athletics Championships in New Delhi, Pembroke successfully defended his world title in the men's javelin throw F13, throwing a season's best distance of 68.51 m. Despite suffering a tear of his right hip adductor just four weeks prior, he overcame the injury to claim gold with that throw.

With this win, Pembroke extended his run of world championship titles in the F13 javelin to three in a row.
