= Justin Phongsavanh =

American Paralympic athlete

Personal information
- Born: May 19, 1997 (age 29) Des Moines, Iowa, U.S.

Sport
- Country: United States
- Sport: Paralympic athletics
- Disability class: F54
- Event: javelin throw
Medal record
Paralympic athletics
Representing the United States
Summer Paralympics
Bronze medal – third place	2020 Tokyo	javelin throw F54
Parapan American Games
Gold medal – first place	2019 Lima	javelin throw F54
Silver medal – second place	2023 Santiago	javelin throw F54

Justin Phongsavanh (Lao: ຈັສຕິນ ພົງສະຫວັນ; born May 19, 1997) is an American Paralympic athlete who specializes in javelin throw. He represented the United States at the 2020 Summer Paralympics.

== Career ==
Phongsavanh made his international debut for the United States at the 2019 Parapan American Games where he won a gold medal in the javelin throw F54 event.

In June 2021, during the U.S. Paralympic Team Trials for Track and Field, Phongsavanh set the javelin throw world record with a distance of 33.29 meters. He represented the United States at the 2020 Summer Paralympics in the javelin throw F54 event and won a bronze medal.

== Personal life ==
Phongsavah is of mixed Laotian and Caucasian ancestry. His biological parents were incarcerated when he was two years old and after spending time in the Iowa foster care system he was adopted by Tamera Shinn and raised in Ankeny, Iowa. On October 24, 2015, Phongsavanh was shot in a McDonald's parking lot. The bullet fragmented into five pieces, with one piece being lodged into his spine resulting in paraplegia.
