= Ajeet Singh Yadav =

Indian javelin thrower

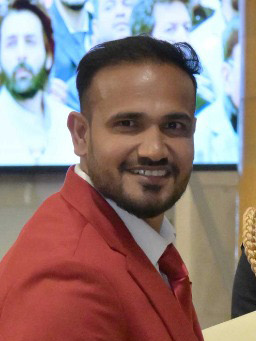
- Singh in January 2025

Personal information
- Born: 5 September 1993 (age 33) Etawah, Uttar Pradesh, India
- Height: 5 ft 11 in (1.80 m)

Sport
- Country: India
- Sport: Athletics
- Disability class: F46
- Event: Javelin throw
Medal record
Men's para-athletics
Representing India
Paralympic Games
Silver medal – second place	2024 Paris	Javelin throw F46
Asian Para Games
Silver medal – second place	2026 Aichi–Nagoya	Javelin throw F46
Bronze medal – third place	2022 Hangzhou	Javelin throw F46
World Para Championships
Bronze medal – third place	2024 Kobe	Javelin throw F46
Gold medal – first place	2023 Paris	Javelin throw F46
Bronze medal – third place	2019 Dubai	Javelin throw F46
World Para Grand Prix
Gold medal – first place	2019 Beijing	Javelin throw F46
Gold medal – first place	2021 Dubai	Javelin throw F46

Ajeet Singh Yadav (born 5 September 1993) is an Indian Para athlete from Uttar Pradesh who competes in men's javelin throw, in F-46 category. On 3 September 2024, he won a silver medal in javelin throw F46 category at the 2024 Summer Paralympics in Paris.

== Early life ==
Ajeet Singh was born in 1993 in Etawah Uttar Pradesh. He is studying in Gwalior, Madhya Pradesh. In 2017, he was involved in a tragic train accident while saving his friend. As a result, he is missing his left arm below the elbow. During recovery and rehab phase, almost after 4 months of accident, he took part in Para Athletic Senior National 2018 in Panchkula, Haryana.

He was included in Sports Authority of India Government of India program under Target Olympic Podium Scheme, and is also supported by the Olympic Gold Quest. He had completed his PhD in physical education and sports from Laxmibai National Institute of Physical Education, LNIPE, Gwalior.

== Career ==
After taking the sport of para javelin, he made his international debut in 2019. He took part in 7th World Para Athletics Grand Prix held in Beijing, China and won gold medal in the javelin throw. He represented India in the 2019 World Para Athletics Championships in Dubai where he claimed a bronze medal and as a result he qualified for the 2020 Summer Paralympics. He also claimed a gold medal in the 2021 World Para Athletics Grand Prix.

=== Paralympics ===
He made his Paralympic debut representing India at the 2020 Summer Paralympics. He qualified to represent India at the 2024 Summer Paralympics at Paris, his second Olympics.
