= Corey Anderson (javelin thrower) =

Australian Paralympic athlete

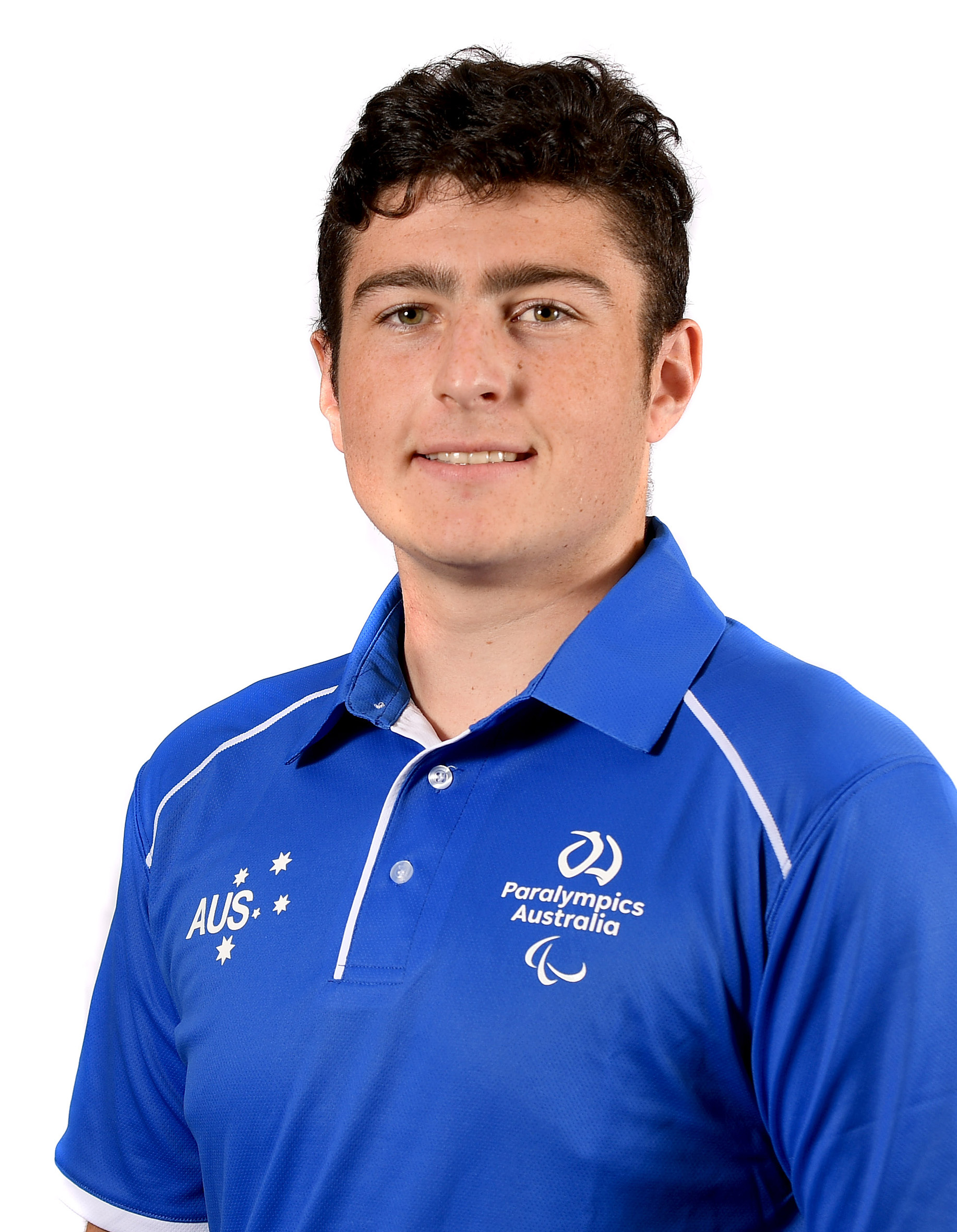
- Corey Anderson in 2019

Personal information
- Nationality: Australia
- Born: 25 May 2000 (age 26)

Sport
- Coached by: Lukas Cannon
Medal record
Men's Track and Field
Representing Australia
World Para Athletics Championships
Gold medal – first place	2019 Dubai	Men's Javelin Throw F38

Corey Anderson (born 25 May 2000) is an Australian para-athlete who competes in the F38 category in throwing events. He won the gold medal in the Men's Javelin F38 at the 2019 World Para Athletics Championships in Dubai. He represented Australia at the 2020 Tokyo Summer Paralympics and the 2024 Paris Paralympics.

== Personal ==
Anderson was born on 25 May 2000. He has left hemiplegic cerebral palsy which was diagnosed after 2017. He lives in Toowoomba, Queensland.

== Sporting career ==
He won the silver medal in the Men's Javelin at the 2017 INAS Athletics Championships, Bangkok, Thailand. During the competition, his mother noticed he moved differently than other athletes and he was subsequently diagnosed with left hemiplegic cerebral palsy. He transferred to competing in Paralympic throwing events and is classified as F38 athlete. At the 2019 Australian Athletics Championships in Sydney, New South Wales, he set a new world record in the men's javelin F38 with a throw of 55.14 m.

At the 2019 World Para Athletics Championships in Dubai, in winning the gold medal in the Men's Javelin F38 he broke his own world record with a throw of 56.28 m. He competed at the championships under duress due to rolling his ankle several days prior to the event.

At the 2020 Tokyo Summer Paralympics, he finished fourth in the Men's Javelin F38 with a throw of 54.48. He finished fifth in the Men's Javelin F38 at the 2023 World Para Athletics Championships in Paris with a throw of 44.89m. At the 2024 World Para Athletics Championships in Kobe, he finished fourth in the Men's Javelin F38 with a throw of 49.73m. At the 2024 Paris Paralympics, he finished sixth in the Men's Javelin throw F38. At the 2025 World Para Athletics Championships in New Delhi, he finished sixth in the Men's Javelin throw F38.

Anderson is now coached Lukas Cannon and by Desmond Davis and is a Queensland Academy of Sport scholarship athlete.

== Recognition ==
- 2017 – Sports Darling Downs Junior Para Athlete of the Year.
- 2018 – Sports Darling Downs Para Athlete of the Year.
