= Hamed Heidari =

Iranian Paralympic athlete

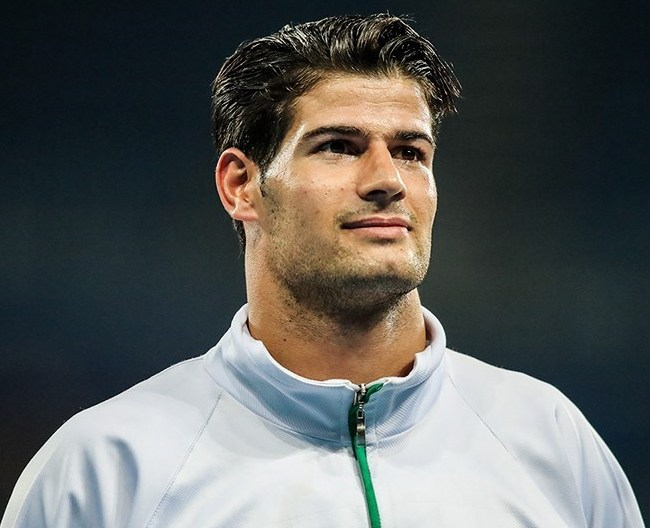

Personal information
- Full name: Hamed Moharramali Oghlu Heidari
- Born: March 26, 1991 (age 35) Kolowr, Ardabil, Iran
Medal record
Representing Iran
Paralympic Games
Silver medal – second place	2016 Rio de Janeiro	Men's Javelin Throw - F57
IPC World Championships
Bronze medal – third place	2017 London	Javelin F57
Representing Azerbaijan
Paralympic Games
Gold medal – first place	2020 Tokyo	Men's Javelin Throw - F57
IPC European Championships
Silver medal – second place	2021 Bydgoszcz	Javelin F57

Hamed Heidari or Abdollah Heidari Til is an Iranian-born Paralympian athlete competing mainly in category Javelin Throw - F57 events who represented Iran until 2017 after which he has represented the Republic of Azerbaijan.

== Biography ==
Hamed Heidari was born in Ardabil in Azerbaijani family. He was injured during wartime and has limb deficiency. He took up Para athletics in 2009. His international debut was in 2015 in United Arab Emirates when he represented Iran. He won a silver medal in the F57 javelin throw at the 2016 Summer Paralympics in Rio de Janeiro. In 2017 he won a bronze medal in the F57 javelin throw at the 2017 World Para Athletics Championships at London.

In 2021 Heidari won a silver medal for Azerbaijan at the 2021 World Para Athletics European Championships at Bydgoszcz in the F57 javelin throw with the throw of 43.49 meters. At the 2020 Summer Paralympics at Tokyo Hamed Heidari representing Azerbaijan won a gold medal in the F57 javelin throw with a world record throw of 51.42 meters, breaking the previous record of Amanolah Papi from Iran (49.56) which was set in the same session moments ago.
