= Abhishek Chamoli =

Indian para athlete

Personal information
- Born: 1997 (age 28–29) New Delhi, India

Sport
- Sport: Paralympic athletics
Medal record
Representing India
World Championships
Bronze medal – third place	2023 Paris	Javelin throw F54
Asian Para Games
Bronze medal – third place	2022 Hangzhou	Javelin throw F54

Abhishek Chamoli (born 1997) is an Indian para athlete from New Delhi. He competes in men's javelin throw F54 category. He qualified to represent India at the 2024 Summer Paralympics at Paris. However, he was dropped from the final list of participants for Paralympics at the last minute.

== Background ==
Chamoli's father died when he was young and his mother, a physical education teacher, brought him up. At 21, he met with an accident as a pillion rider in Delhi and injured his spinal cord. He is now paralysed below his chest. Then he took up para sports. And he learnt the basics from his first coach Hukam Singh Rawat. He is supported by Samarth by Hyundai programme in partnership with NDTV.

== Career ==
Chamoli represented India at the 13th Fazza International Para Athletics Championships held in Dubai in March 2022. In 2023, he won a bronze in men's javelin throw F54 at the 2022 Asian Para Games at Hangzhou, China. Earlier, he won a gold in javelin throw F54 at the Italian Open 2023 World Para Athletics Grand Prix along with a bronze medal in F54 shot put F54.

He booked an Paralympic quota for India at the Paris 2023 World Para Athletics Championships.
