= Hamed Amiri =

Iranian Paralympic athlete (born 1982)

Personal information
- Born: 6 June 1982 (age 44)

Sport
- Country: Iran
- Sport: Paralympic athletics
- Disability: Spinal cord injuries
- Disability class: F54
- Events: Javelin throw; Shot put
Medal record
Men's para-athletics
Representing Iran
Paralympic Games
Gold medal – first place	2020 Tokyo	Javelin throw F54
Silver medal – second place	2016 Rio de Janeiro	Shot put F55
World Championships
Gold medal – first place	2019 Dubai	Javelin throw F54
Silver medal – second place	2017 London	Javelin throw F54
Bronze medal – third place	2017 London	Shot put F55
Asian Para Games
Gold medal – first place	2018 Jakarta	Shot put F54/55
Gold medal – first place	2018 Jakarta	Javelin throw F53/54
Bronze medal – third place	2018 Jakarta	Discus throw F54/55/56
Bronze medal – third place	2026 Aichi–Nagoya	Shot put F54/55

Hamed Amiri (born 6 June 1982) is an Iranian para athlete. He won the gold medal in the javelin throw F54 event at the 2020 Summer Paralympics. He also won a silver medal in the shot put F55 event at the 2016 Summer Paralympics.

== Career ==
Amiri won two medals at the 2017 World Championships held in London, United Kingdom: the silver medal in the men's javelin throw F54 event and the bronze medal in the men's shot put F55 event. At the 2019 World Championships held in Dubai, United Arab Emirates, he won one medal: the gold medal in the men's javelin throw F54 event. As a result, he qualified to represent Iran at the 2020 Summer Paralympics in Tokyo, Japan.

Amiri competed in the Iran's Strongest Man competition for 11 consecutive years, winning the event in 2009. A car accident in December 2011 led to his disability and his eventual decision to enter the field of para-athletics.

Just weeks before the Tokyo Paralympics were due to start, Amiri sustained an arm injury and initially withdrew from the Games as he was unable to continue with his training. After undergoing hospital treatment, he reversed his decision not to enter the event, vowing to put all his effort into his first throw no matter what the cost.

== Achievements ==
Year	Competition	Venue	Position	Event	Notes
Representing Iran
2016	Summer Paralympics	Rio de Janeiro, Brazil	2nd	Shot put	11.40 m
2017	World Championships	London, United Kingdom	2nd	Javelin throw	27.81 m
2017	World Championships	London, United Kingdom	3rd	Shot put	11.17 m
2019	World Championships	Dubai, United Arab Emirates	1st	Javelin throw	29.77 m
2021	Summer Paralympics	Tokyo, Japan	1st	Javelin throw	31.35 m
