= Ivan Revenko =

Russian Paralympic athlete (born 1986)

Personal information
- Native name: Иван Ревенко
- Nationality: Russian
- Born: 12 April 1986 (age 40) Barnaul, Russia

Sport
- Sport: Para-athletics
- Disability class: F54
- Event: javelin throw
Medal record
Men's para-athletics
Representing Neutral Paralympic Athletes
Paralympic Games
Gold medal – first place	2024 Paris	Javelin throw F54
World Championships
Silver medal – second place	2025 New Delhi	Javelin throw F54
Representing Russia
European Championships
Bronze medal – third place	2021 Bydgoszcz	Javelin throw F54

Ivan Revenko (Russian: Иван Ревенко; born 12 April 1986) is a Russian para-athlete specializing in javelin throw.

== Career ==
Revenko represented Neutral Paralympic Athletes at the 2024 Summer Paralympics and won a gold medal in the javelin throw F54 event.
