= Sun Pengxiang =

Chinese Paralympic athlete (born 1991)

Personal information
- Born: 16 January 1991 (age 35) Inner Mongolia, China
- Height: 137 cm (54 in)

Sport
- Country: China
- Sport: Athletics
- Disability class: F41
- Event(s): shot put javelin throw
- Club: Inner Mongolia
- Coached by: Wang Xingzhang
Medal record
Men's para-athletics
Representing China
Paralympic Games
| Gold medal – first place | 2020 Tokyo | Javelin throw F41 |
| Silver medal – second place | 2024 Paris | Javelin throw F41 |
| Bronze medal – third place | 2016 Rio de Janeiro | Javelin throw F41 |
World Championships
| Gold medal – first place | 2015 Doha | Javelin throw F41 |
| Gold medal – first place | 2017 London | Javelin throw F41 |
| Gold medal – first place | 2019 Dubai | Javelin throw F41 |
| Gold medal – first place | 2023 Paris | Javelin throw F41 |
| Bronze medal – third place | 2025 New Delhi | Javelin throw F41 |
Asian Para Games
| Gold medal – first place | 2018 Jakarta | Javelin throw F41 |
| Gold medal – first place | 2022 Hangzhou | Javelin throw F41 |
| Bronze medal – third place | 2022 Hangzhou | Shot put F41 |

Sun Pengxiang (born 16 January 1991) is a Paralympian athlete from China competing mainly in F41 classification throwing events.

== Athletics career ==
Sun first represented China at a major international during the 2015 IPC Athletics World Championships in Doha, entering the shot put and javelin throw events. He finished fifth in the shot put, but finished on the podium in the javelin, throwing a new world record with a distance of 43.67 metes to take the gold medal.

The following year he qualified for his first Paralympic Games, representing his country in the javelin at 2016 Summer Paralympics. Sun was unable to replicate the form he had shown in Doha, but his best throw of 41.81 was enough to win him the bronze medal.
