= Wildan Nukhailawi =

Iraqi Paralympic athlete

Personal information
- Born: 10 August 1986 (age 39) Baghdad, Iraq
- Height: 141 cm (56 in)

Sport
- Country: Iraq
- Sport: Athletics
- Disability class: F41
- Event(s): Javelin throw, Discus throw, Shot put
- Club: El Wesam Club
- Coached by: Raeed Abduallah Eskandar
Medal record
Track and field
Representing Iraq
Paralympic Games
Silver medal – second place	2016 Rio de Janeiro	Javelin throw F41
Bronze medal – third place	2012 London	Javelin throw F40
Bronze medal – third place	2020 Tokyo	Javelin throw F41
Bronze medal – third place	2024 Paris	Javelin throw F41
World Championships
Silver medal – second place	2011 Christchurch	Javelin throw F40
Bronze medal – third place	2023 Paris	Javelin throw F41
Asian Para Games
Gold medal – first place	2014 Incheon	Shot put F41
Silver medal – second place	2010 Guangzhou	Shot put F40
Silver medal – second place	2014 Incheon	Discus throw F41

Wildan Nezar Al-Nukhailawi (born 10 August 1986) is a Paralympian athlete from Iraq competing in the F41 classification throwing events. He won a bronze medal in the javelin at the 2012 Summer Paralympics in London and followed this four years later with a silver in the same event at the 2016 Games in Rio de Janeiro.

== Athletics career ==
Nukhailawi represented Iraq at the 2012 Summer Paralympics, entering the shot put, discus and javelin throw. His best result was in the javelin, in which he finished third. Nukhailawi also competed for Iraq at three IPC Athletics World Championships, winning a silver medal in the javelin in 2011 in Christchurch. After the 2012 Paralympics, the International Paralympic Committee reclassified the F40 category, creating two new classifications. Nukhailawi was placed in the F41 classification from which he competed from 2013. It was in this category that he won the shot put gold medal at the 2014 Asian Para Games in Incheon.
