= Sadegh Beit Sayah =

Iranian Paralympic athlete

Sadegh Beit Sayah صادق بیت سیاح
Personal information
- Native name: صادق بیت سیاح
- Born: 17 December 1986 (age 39) Ahvaz, Iran

Sport
- Country: Iran
- Sport: Para-athletics
- Disability class: F41
- Events: Javelin throw; Shot put
Medal record
Men's para-athletics
Representing Iran
Paralympic Games
Silver medal – second place	2020 Tokyo	Javelin throw F41
World Championships
Gold medal – first place	2025 New Delhi	Javelin throw F41
Silver medal – second place	2023 Paris	Javelin throw F41
Asian Para Games
Gold medal – first place	2014 Incheon	Discus throw F41
Silver medal – second place	2014 Incheon	Shot put F41

Sadegh Beit Sayah (Persian: صادق بیت سیاح, born 17 December 1986) is an Iranian Paralympic athlete who specializes in throwing events.

== Career ==
He won the silver medal in the men's javelin throw F41 event at the 2020 Summer Paralympics held in Tokyo, Japan.

He initially placed first at the 2024 Paralympics but was disqualified under Rule 8.1 (Unsporting or improper conduct). An appeal by the Iranian delegation was dismissed the following day. Iranian authorities confirmed that Sayah had displayed a religious flag during the competition, which is against World Para Athletics regulations.
