= Ulicer Aguilera Cruz =

Cuban Paralympic athlete (born 1989)

Personal information
- Nationality: Cuban
- Born: 29 September 1989 (age 37) Banes, Cuba

Sport
- Sport: Para-athletics
- Disability class: F13
- Event: javelin throw
Medal record
Men's para-athletics
Representing Cuba
Paralympic Games
Bronze medal – third place	2024 Paris	Javelin throw F13
World Championships
Silver medal – second place	2025 New Delhi	Javelin throw F13
Bronze medal – third place	2023 Paris	Javelin throw F13
Parapan American Games
Gold medal – first place	2019 Lima	Javelin throw F13

Ulicer Aguilera Cruz (born 29 September 1989) is a Cuban para-athlete specializing in javelin throw.

== Career ==
Cruz competed at the 2023 World Para Athletics Championships and won a bronze medal in the javelin throw F13 event.

Cruz represented Cuba at the 2024 Summer Paralympics and won a bronze medal in the javelin throw F13 event.
