= Sundar Singh Gurjar =

Indian Paralympic javelin thrower

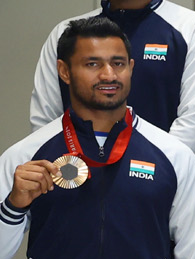
- Gurjar in 2024

Personal information
- Born: 1 January 1996 (age 30) Karauli, Rajasthan, India

Sport
- Sport: Para-athletics
- Disability class: F46
- Event: Javelin throw
- Coached by: Mahavir Prasad Saini
Medal record
Men's para-athletics
Representing India
Paralympic Games
Bronze medal – third place	2020 Tokyo	Javelin throw F46
Bronze medal – third place	2024 Paris	Javelin throw F46
World Para Championships
Gold medal – first place	2017 London	Javelin throw F46
Silver medal – second place	2025 New Delhi	Javelin throw F46
Asian Para Games
Gold medal – first place	2022 Hangzhou	Javelin throw F46
Silver medal – second place	2018 Jakarta	Javelin throw F46
Bronze medal – third place	2018 Jakarta	Discus throw F46

Sundar Singh Gurjar (born 1 January 1996) an Indian para-athlete. He competes in javelin throw, shot put and discus throw in F46 category events. He won bronze medals at 2020 Tokyo Paralympics and the 2024 Paris Paralympics in men's javelin F46 event.

== Early life ==
Gurjar is born in Karauli, Rajasthan.

== Sport career ==
In 2016 Sundar Singh Gurjar registered the 'A' qualification mark for the 2016 Rio Paralympics with a performance of 59.36m in 8th Fazza IPC Athletics Grand Prix, Dubai. He created a national record with 68.42m during the 16th Para Athletics National Championship in Panchkula. In 9th FAZZA IPC Athletics Grand Prix, Sundar Singh Gurjar won three gold medals in javelin throw, shot put and discus throw under the coaching of Mahaveer Prasad Saini. He won silver medal in javelin throw and bronze medal in discus throw in Asian Para Games 2018. In 2019, he won a gold medal at the 9th World Para Athletics Championships and in doing so, he not only defended his 2017 World Para Athletics Championships title but also became the only second Indian to have clinched two World Championships medals after Devendra Jhajharia.

He set a world record at the 16th Para Athletics National Championship in Panchkula holding three gold medals in three events.

On 30 August 2021, Sundar Singh won bronze medal in the men's javelin throw F46 event at 2020 Summer Paralympics along with Devendra Jhajharia (silver medal at the same event).

== Awards ==
He is a recipient of Arjuna Award for para-athletics.
