= Manolis Stefanoudakis =

Greek Paralympic athlete (born 1983)

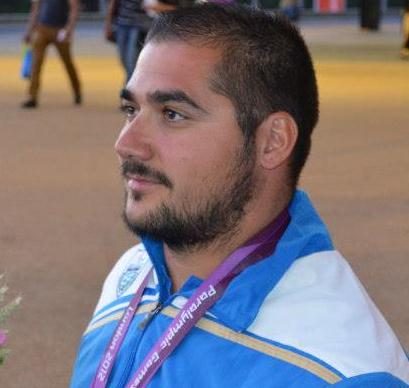
- Stefanoudakis In 2012

Personal information
- Nationality: Greek
- Born: 5 April 1983 (age 43) Heraklion, Greece

Sport
- Country: Greece
- Sport: Paralympic athletics
- Disability class: F54
- Event(s): javelin throw, shot put
- Club: Megalonissos: Heraklion
- Coached by: Giorgos Varveraki
Medal record
Representing Greece
Paralympic Games
Gold medal – first place	2016 Rio	Javelin F53/54
Bronze medal – third place	2012 London	Javelin F54/55/56
Bronze medal – third place	2024 Paris	Javelin throw F54
World Championships
Gold medal – first place	2015 Doha	Javelin F54
Gold medal – first place	2023 Paris	Javelin F54
Silver medal – second place	2024 Kobe	Javelin throw F54
Bronze medal – third place	2013 Lyon	Javelin F54/55/56
European Championships
Silver medal – second place	2014 Swansea	Javelin F54
Silver medal – second place	2016 Grosseto	Javelin F54

Manolis Stefanoudakis (Greek: Μανώλης Στεφανουδάκης born 5 April 1983) is a Paralympian athlete from Greece who competes in category F54 throwing events. He won a bronze and a gold medal in the javelin throw at the 2012 and 2016 Paralympics, respectively.

== Personal history ==
Stefanoudakis was born in Heraklion, Greece in 1983. He suffered permanent spinal cord injuries after a traffic accident in 2007.

== Athletics career ==
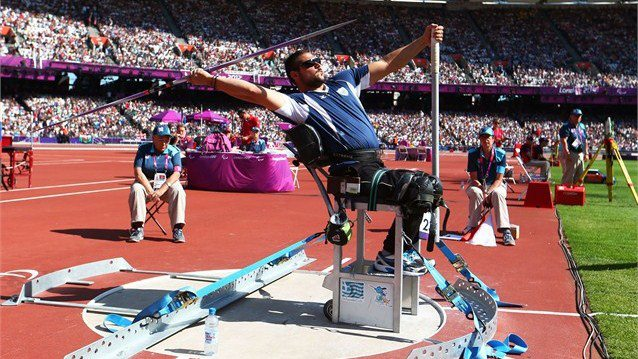
Stefanoudakis at the 2012 Paralympic Games

Stefanoudakis took to para-sport after his accident as a way for improving his health. He first tried our swimming, but a lack of facilities curtailed this option. He took to athletics instead and by 2010 he was classified as a F54 athlete and was competing at meets. Stefanoudakis represented Greece at the 2012 Summer Paralympics in London. There he competed in both the F54–56 Shot put and the F54/55/56 javelin throw, winning bronze in the latter with a distance of 27.37 metres. As well as Paralympic success, Stefanoudakis has also won medals at both World and European Championships level. His most notable achievement in athletics outside the Paralympics was a gold medal in the T54 javelin at the 2015 Championships in Doha.

He was awarded as the Best Greek male athlete with a disability for 2015.

The Greek Olympic Committee designated him as the flag bearer for the opening ceremony at the Paris 2024 Olympic Games, along with Theodora Paschalidou.
