= Navdeep Singh (athlete) =

Indian Paralympian (born 2000)

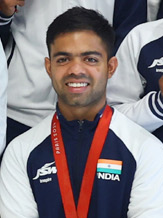
- Singh in 2024

Personal information
- Full name: Navdeep Singh Sheoran
- Born: 11 November 2000 (age 25) Panipat, Haryana, India
- Education: Sri Venkateswara College

Sport
- Sport: Para-athletics
- Disability class: F41
- Coached by: Vipin Kasana

Achievements and titles
- Paralympic finals: 2024 Paris: (gold); 2020 Tokyo: 4th
Medal record
Men's para-athletics
Representing India
Paralympic Games
Gold medal – first place	2024 Paris	Javelin throw F41
World Championships
Silver medal – second place	2025 New Delhi	Javelin throw F41
Bronze medal – third place	2024 Kobe	Javelin throw F41
Asian Youth Para Games
Gold medal – first place	2017 Dubai	Javelin throw F41

Navdeep Singh Sheoran (born 11 November 2000) is an Indian para javelin thrower. He won the gold medal at the 2024 Paris Paralympics. He is also a silver and bronze medalist at the World Championships.

== Personal life ==
Navdeep Singh hails from Panipat, Haryana, India.

== Career ==
In 2017, Singh won the gold medal for India in the men's javelin F41 event at Asian Youth Para Games, Dubai. He proceeded to win the gold medal at the World Para Athletics Grand Prix 2021 in Dubai.

Singh finished fourth in javelin throw F41 at the 2020 Tokyo Paralympics. He won the gold medal at the 2024 Paris Paralympics.

== See also ==
- Athletics in India
- Indian at 2020 Summer Paralympics
- Indian at 2024 Summer Paralympics
