= Jackson Hamilton =

Australian Paralympic athlete

Personal information
- Nationality: Australian
- Born: 21 May 2003 (age 23)

Sport
- Country: Australia
- Sport: Athletics
- Club: University of Western Australia Athletics Club

Jackson Hamilton (born 21 May 2003) is an Australian Paralympic vision impaired athletics competitor. He competed at the 2024 Paris Paralympics.

== Personal ==
Hamilton was born on 21 May 2003. He has a rare genetic condition, X-linked juvenile retinoschisis, which has left him with just 10 per cent vision. His condition degenerated making him legally blind at around age 10 to 11. Hamilton learned braille in primary school and "crediting sport for giving him purpose, fulfilment and satisfaction". He attended Shenton College in Perth, Western Australia. He has undertaken Exercise and Sport Science degree at Notre Dame University.

== Athletics ==
He is classified as a F13 athlete. At the age of six, he joined University of WA Little Athletics club. He also played basketball but had to give it up with his sight deteriorating. In his youth, Hamilton broke many Australian F13 records in the long jump, shot put, discus throw and javelin. He has focused on the javelin as it was the only field event he could compete in at the 2024 Paris Paralympics. He won the gold medal at the 2022 Oceania Athletics Championships with 55.81 m.

At the 2023 World Para Athletics Championships, he finished seventh in the Men's Javelin Throw F13 with a throw of 58.41 m. In 2024, he Hamilton broke his own Australian and Oceania record with a throw of 68.23 m in Perth. At the 2024 Paris Paralympics, he finished sixth in the Men's Javelin throw F13.

He is coached by Morgan Ward and Western Australian Institute of Sport scholarship athlete.
