= Edenilson Floriani =

Brazilian para athlete (born 1990)

Personal information
- Full name: Edenilson Roberto Floriani
- Nationality: Brazilian
- Born: 26 May 1990 (age 36)

Sport
- Sport: Para-athletics
- Disability class: F44
- Event(s): javelin throw shot put
Medal record
Men's para-athletics
Representing Brazil
World Championships
Bronze medal – third place	2023 Paris	Shot put F63
Bronze medal – third place	2025 New Delhi	Javelin throw F44
Bronze medal – third place	2025 New Delhi	Shot put F63
Parapan American Games
Gold medal – first place	2023 Santiago	Shot put F63
Gold medal – first place	2023 Santiago	Javelin throw F64

Edenilson Roberto Floriani (born 26 May 1990) is a Brazilian para-athlete specializing in throwing events. He represented Brazil at the 2020 and 2024 Summer Paralympics.

== Career ==
Floriani represented Brazil at the 2023 Parapan American Games and won gold medals in the shot put F63 and javelin throw F64 events. He represented Brazil at the 2024 Summer Paralympics and finished in fourth place in the shot put F63 event with a throw of 14.57 metres. He competed at the 2025 World Para Athletics Championships and won bronze medals in the javelin throw F44 event and shot put F63 events.
