= Faouzi Rzig =

Tunisian Paralympic athlete

Personal information
- Born: 9 July 1982 (age 43)
Medal record
Men's para-athletics
Representing Tunisia
Paralympic Games
Gold medal – first place	2008 Beijing	Javelin Throw – F33/34/52

Faouzi Rzig (born 9 July 1982), also known as Fawzi Rzig, is a Paralympian athlete from Tunisia competing mainly in category F35 javelin events.

Rzig finished fourth in the F35 javelin in the 2004 Summer Paralympics in Athens, and four years later in Beijing he achieved the gold medal for the combined F33/34/52 class javelin throw.

He also competed in the 2012 Summer Paralympics, as well as in 2016 and 2020, exclusively in javelin events.
