= Amanolah Papi =

Iranian Paralympic athlete (born 1990)

Personal information
- Nationality: Iranian
- Born: 3 April 1990 (age 36) Khorramabad, Iran

Sport
- Sport: Para athletics
- Disability class: F57
- Event: javelin throw
Medal record
Men's para athletics
Representing Iran
Paralympic Games
Silver medal – second place	2020 Tokyo	Javelin throw F57
World Championships
Gold medal – first place	2017 London	Javelin throw F57
Silver medal – second place	2019 Dubai	Javelin throw F57
Bronze medal – third place	2025 New Delhi	Javelin throw F57
Asian Para Games
Gold medal – first place	2022 Hangzhou	Javelin throw F57
Silver medal – second place	2018 Jakarta	Javelin throw F56/57
Bronze medal – third place	2026 Aichi–Nagoya	Javelin throw F56/57

Amanolah Papi (born 3 April 1990) is an Iranian para athlete specializing in javelin throw. He represented Iran at the 2020 and 2024 Summer Paralympics.

== Career ==
In November 2019, Papi competed at the 2019 World Para Athletics Championships and won a silver medal in the javelin throw F57 event with a throw of 47.80 metres. He then represented Iran at the 2020 Summer Paralympics and won a silver medal in javelin throw F57 event.

In October 2023, he competed at the 2022 Asian Para Games and won a gold medal in the javelin throw F57 event with an Asian Para Games record throw of 49.24 metres.
