= F54 (classification) =

Paralympic athletics classification

F54 is a disability sport classification for disability athletics for people who compete in field events from a seated position. Different disability groups compete in this class, including people with spinal cord injuries. Events that may be on the program for F54 competitors include the discus throw, shot put and javelin.

== Definition ==
International Paralympic Committee defined this classification on their website in July 2016, "Athletes have full power and movements in their arms, but no power in their abdominal muscles and typically no sitting balance. An athlete with partial to full trunk control but with upper limbs that fit the F53 profile is appropriately placed in this class." The Spectator Guide for the Rio Paralympics defines the class as, "wheelchair athletes (effects of polio, spinal cord injuries and amputations)"

=== Spinal cord injuries ===
People with spinal cord injuries compete in this class, including F4 sportspeople.

==== F4 ====
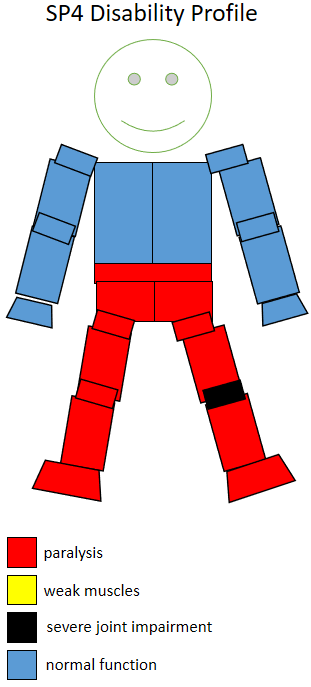
Functional profile of a wheelchair sportsperson in the F4 class.

This is wheelchair sport classification that corresponds to the neurological level T1 - T7. In the past, this class was known as 1C Incomplete, 2 Complete, or Upper 3 Complete.

F4 sportspeople may have good sitting balance and some impairment in their dominant hand. Disabled Sports USA defined the functional definition of this class in 2003 as, "Have no sitting balance. [...] Usually hold onto part of the chair while throwing. Complete Class 2 and upper Class 3 Athletes have normal upper limbs. They can hold the throwing implement normally. They have no functional trunk movements.Incomplete 1C Athletes who have trunk movements, with hand function like F3." People in this class have a total respiratory capacity of 85% compared to people without a disability.

== Performance and rules ==
Athletes in this class used secure frames for throwing events. The frame can be only one of two shapes: A rectangle or square. The sides must be at least 30 centimetres (12 in) long. The seat needs to be lower at the back or level, and it cannot be taller than 75 centimetres (30 in). This height includes any cushioning or padding. Throwers can have footplates on their frames, but the footplate can only be used for stability. It cannot be used to push off from. Rests can be used on the frame but they need to be present only for safety reasons and to aide in athlete stability. They need to be manufactured from rigid materials that do not move. These materials may include steel or aluminum. The backrest can have cushioning but it cannot be thicker than 5 centimetres (2.0 in). It cannot have any movable parts. The frame can also have a holding bar. The holding bar needs to be round or square, and needs to be a single straight piece. Athletes are not required to use a holding bar during their throw, and they can hold on to any part of the frame during their throw. Throwing frames should be inspected prior to the event. This should be done either in the call room or in the competition area. In general, people in this class should be allocated around 2 minutes to set up their chair.

Athletes need to throw from a seated position. They cannot throw from an inclined or other position. Doing so could increase the contribution of their legs and benefit their performance. Their legs must be in contact with the seat during the throw. If an athlete throws from a non-seated position, this is counted as a foul. People in this class cannot put tape on their hands. All straps used to hold the athlete to the frame must be non-elastic. While in the process of throwing, an athlete cannot touch a tie-down for the frame. Because of visibility issues for officials, athletes cannot wear lose clothing and they can ask athletes to tuck in clothing if they feel there is any issue with visibility. In throwing events at the Paralympic Games and World Championships, athletes get three trial throws. After that, the top 8 throwers get an additional three throws. For other events, organizers generally have the option to use that formula to give all throwers six consecutive throws. The total number of warm-up throws is at the discretion of the meet director.

== Events ==
Events that may be on the program for F54 competitors include the discus throw, shot put and javelin.

== Competitors ==
Sportspeople competing in this class include Tunisia's Hania Aidi, and the Serbia's Draženko Mitrović.
