= Marek Wietecki =

Polish Paralympic athlete

Personal information
- Born: 2 June 1983 (age 43) Gorzów Wielkopolski, Poland

Sport
- Country: Poland
- Sport: Paralympic athletics
- Disability class: T12
- Event(s): Discus throw Javelin throw Shot put
Medal record
Paralympic athletics
Representing Poland
World Championships
Bronze medal – third place	2015 Doha	Discus throw F12
European Championships
Gold medal – first place	2018 Berlin	Discus throw F12
Silver medal – second place	2014 Swansea	Discus throw F12
Silver medal – second place	2016 Grosseto	Discus throw F12
Silver medal – second place	2021 Bydgoszcz	Javelin throw F13
Bronze medal – third place	2014 Swansea	Javelin throw F12

Marek Wietecki (born 2 June 1983) is a Polish Paralympic athlete who competes at international elite competitions. He is a World bronze medalist and a European champion in discus throw, he has also won two medals in javelin throw. He competed at the 2020 Summer Paralympics in the javelin throw and shot put where he finished in sixth place in both events on his debut appearance at the Games.
