= Athletics at the 2024 Summer Paralympics – Qualification =

Athletics at the 2024 Summer Paralympics will be held at the Stade Charléty between 30 August and 8 September.

== Timeline ==
Means of qualification	Date	Venue	Berths
2023 Marathon World Championships	TBD	TBD	24
2023 World Para Athletics Championships	8–17 July 2023	(France) Paris	652
2023 World Para Athletics Grand Prix	6–8 February 2023	(Tunisia) Tunis	—N/a
2023 World Para Athletics Grand Prix	26 February – 1 March 2023	(United Arab Emirates) Dubai	—N/a
2023 World Para Athletics Grand Prix	9–11 March 2023	(Morocco) Marrakesh	—N/a
2023 World Para Athletics Grand Prix	27–29 April 2023	(Mexico) Xalapa	—N/a
2023 World Para Athletics Grand Prix	12–14 May 2023	(Italy) Jesolo	—N/a
2023 World Para Athletics Grand Prix	25–27 May 2023	(Switzerland) Nottwil	—N/a
2022 Asian Para Games	22–28 October 2023	(China) Hangzhou	—N/a
2023 Parapan American Games	17–26 November 2023	(Chile) Santiago	—N/a
High Performance Allocation	1 October 2023 – 16 June 2024	—	57
Bipartite Commission Invitation	2 June 2024	—	10
2024 World Para Athletics Championships	17–25 May 2024	(Japan) Kobe	326
Total			1069

== Qualification ==
Allocation of qualification slots are awarded to the NPC not the individual athlete.

- Maximum number of slots awards to an NPC is 40 male and 33 female slots (73 total slots). However, exceptions may be granted through the Bipartite Commission Invitation method which starts in early June 2024.
- An NPC can enter a maximum of three eligible athletes per individual medal event.
- An NPC can enter one team in the relay medal event.
  - A maximum of sixteen NPCs are each eligible to enter one team in the Universal Relay medal event.
  - Four top ranked NPCs in the 2023 and 2024 World Championships each obtain one team entry.
  - A Universal Relay Qualification Ranking for 1 October 2023 to 16 June 2024 will be in place: the eight highest ranked teams will obtain one team entry.
- An NPC can enter a maximum of six eligible athletes in each marathon event; a maximum of three NPC athletes can enter each marathon medal event as their only event.
- An NPC can enter an eligible athlete in an unlimited number of individual events within their classification (or, on occasion, in a higher classification if its open to lower classifications) - as long as the athlete has achieved an MES (minimal entry standard) performance in each respective event. As such, when an athlete gains a quota place in one event, subsequent results that would earn further quota places are ignored, except for relay teams. In effect, unlike at the Olympic Games, a quota place gains entry to the entire Paralympic Games athletic meet at that classification, rather than only the event the quota was gained in.

== Qualified slots ==
=== Men's track ===
==== 100 metres ====
Event	Class(es)	Minimum Entry Standard (MES)	No. of athletes	NPC	Qualified
100m T11	T11	11.90	1	Greece	Athanasios Ghavelas
100m T11	T11	11.90	1	Namibia	Ananias Shikongo
100m T12	T12	11.50	1	Great Britain	Zac Shaw
100m T12	T12	11.50	1	Morocco	Mouncef Bouja
100m T12	T12	11.50	1	South Africa	Jaco Smit
100m T12	T12	11.50	1	United States	Noah Malone
100m T13	T13	11.50	1	Algeria	Skander Djamil Athmani
100m T13	T13	11.50	1	Australia	Chad Perris
100m T13	T13	11.50	1	Brazil	Fabrício Barros
100m T13	T13	11.50	1	Japan	Shuta Kawakami
100m T13	T13	11.50	1	Norway	Salum Ageze Kashafali
100m T13	T13	11.50	1	Thailand	Jakkarin Dammunee
100m T34	T33; T34	17.30	1	Canada	Austin Smeenk
100m T34	T33; T34	17.30	1	Mauritius	Roberto Michel
100m T34	T33; T34	17.30	1	Thailand	Chaiwat Rattana
100m T34	T33; T34	17.30	1	Tunisia	Walid Ktila
100m T35	T35	15.00	1	Ukraine	Ivan Tetiukhin
100m T36	T36	13.30	2	China	Deng Peicheng; Yang Yifei
100m T36	T36	13.30	1	Algeria	Mokhtar Didane
100m T37	T37	12.80	2	Brazil	Ricardo Gomes de Mendonça; Christian Gabriel Luiz Da Costa
100m T37	T37	12.80	1	Indonesia	Saptoyoga Purnomo
100m T37	T37	12.80	1	Neutral Paralympic Athletes	Andrey Vdovin
100m T37	T37	12.80	1	Ukraine	Vladyslav Zahrebelnyi
100m T38	T38	12.50	2	United States	Jaydin Blackwell; Nick Mayhugh
100m T38	T38	12.50	1	China	Zhu Dening
100m T38	T38	12.50	1	Colombia	Santiago Solís
100m T38	T38	12.50	1	France	Dimitri Jowicki
100m T38	T38	12.50	1	Great Britain	Thomas Young
100m T44	T44	12.50	1	Brazil	Matheus de Lima
100m T44	T44	12.50	1	Egypt	Karim Ramadan
100m T44	T44	12.50	1	Italy	Marco Cicchetti
100m T44	T44	12.50	1	Malaysia	Eddy Bernard
100m T44	T44	12.50	1	South Africa	Mpumelelo Mhlongo
100m T47	T45; T46; T47	11.60	2	Brazil	Petrúcio Ferreira; Junior Washington
100m T47	T45; T46; T47	11.60	1	Great Britain	Kevin Santos
100m T47	T45; T46; T47	11.60	1	Poland	Michał Derus
100m T47	T45; T46; T47	11.60	1	Germany	Phil Grolla
100m T51	T51	28.00	2	Belgium	Peter Genyn; Roger Habsch
100m T51	T51	28.00	1	Algeria	Mohamed Berrahal
100m T51	T51	28.00	1	Canada	Cody Fournie
100m T51	T51	28.00	1	Finland	Toni Piispanen
100m T52	T52	20.00	1	Australia	Sam McIntosh
100m T52	T52	20.00	1	Great Britain	Marcus Perrineau-Daley
100m T52	T52	20.00	1	Mexico	Salvador Hernández
100m T52	T52	20.00	1	Switzerland	Fabian Blum
100m T53	T53	16.20	1	Brazil	Ariosvaldo Fernandes
100m T53	T53	16.20	1	Saudi Arabia	Abdulrahman Al-Qurashi
100m T54	T54	14.70	1	China	Zhang Ying
100m T54	T54	14.70	1	Finland	Leo-Pekka Tähti
100m T63	T42; T63	15.20 |	1	Brazil	Vinícius Gonçalves Rodrigues
100m T63	T42; T63	15.20 |	1	South Africa	Puseletso Michael Mabote
100m T64	T62; T64	11.80	2	Germany	Felix Streng; Johannes Floors
100m T64	T62; T64	11.80	1	Costa Rica	Sherman Guity
100m T64	T62; T64	11.80	1	Great Britain	Jonnie Peacock
100m T64	T62; T64	11.80	1	Italy	Maxcel Amo Manu
100m T64	T62; T64	11.80	1	United States	Hunter Woodhall

==== 200 metres ====
Event	Class(es)	Minimum Entry Standard (MES)	No. of athletes	NPC	Qualified
200m T35	T35	30.00	1	Argentina	Hernan Barreto
200m T35	T35	30.00	1	Brazil	Fábio da Silva Bordignon
200m T35	T35	30.00	1	Ukraine	Ihor Tsvietov
200m T37	T37	25.80	1	France	Renaud Clerc
200m T37	T37	25.80	1	Ukraine	Yaroslav Okapinskyi
200m T51	T51	51.00	1	Mexico	Edgar Navarro
200m T64	T64	25.00	1	Brazil	Wallison Fortes
200m T64	T64	25.00	1	Italy	Fabio Bottazzini
200m T64	T64	25.00	1	Japan	Kengo Oshima
200m T64	T64	25.00	1	New Zealand	Mitchell Joynt
200m T64	T64	25.00	1	Spain	Alberto Avila Chamorro

==== 400 metres ====
Event	Class(es)	Minimum Entry Standard (MES)	No. of athletes	NPC	Qualified
400m T11	T11	57.00	2	France	Timothee Adolphe; Gautier Makunda
400m T11	T11	57.00	2	Spain	Gerard Descarrega; Eduardo Manuel Uceda Novas
400m T11	T11	57.00	1	Brazil	Felipe de Souza Gomes
400m T11	T11	57.00	1	Namibia	Chris Kinda
400m T12	T12	54.00	2	Turkey	Oğuz Akbulut; Serkan Yıldırım
400m T12	T12	54.00	1	Colombia	Yamil Acosta
400m T12	T12	54.00	1	Malawi	Mphatso Saukire
400m T12	T12	54.00	1	Thailand	Kissanapong Tisuwan
400m T20	T20	51.60	2	Brazil	Samuel Oliveira; Daniel Martins
400m T20	T20	51.60	1	Colombia	Jhon Obando
400m T20	T20	51.60	1	France	Charles-Antoine Kouakou
400m T20	T20	51.60	1	Mauritius	Yovanni Phillippe
400m T36	T36	1:06.00	1	Argentina	Alexis Sebastian Chavez
400m T36	T36	1:06.00	1	Australia	James Turner
400m T36	T36	1:06.00	1	Japan	Takeru Matsumoto
400m T36	T36	1:06.00	1	New Zealand	William Stedman
400m T37	T37	1:00.00	1	Algeria	Sofiane Hamdi
400m T37	T37	1:00.00	1	Brazil	Bartolomeu da Silva
400m T37	T37	1:00.00	1	Poland	Michał Kotkowski
400m T38	T38	57.50	1	Canada	Zachary Gingras
400m T38	T38	57.50	1	Iraq	Ali Al-Rikabi
400m T38	T38	57.50	1	United States	Ryan Medrano
400m T47	T45; T46; T47	52.50	1	Brazil	José Martins
400m T47	T45; T46; T47	52.50	1	India	Dilip Gavit
400m T47	T45; T46; T47	52.50	1	Morocco	Ayoub Sadni
400m T47	T45; T46; T47	52.50	1	South Africa	Collen Mahlalela
400m T47	T45; T46; T47	52.50	1	United States	Tanner Wright
400m T52	T51; T52	1:25.00	2	Japan	Tomoki Sato; Tatsuya Ito
400m T52	T51; T52	1:25.00	1	Belgium	Maxime Carabin
400m T52	T51; T52	1:25.00	1	Mexico	Leonardo de Jesús Pérez Juárez
400m T53	T53	55.60	2	Thailand	Pongsakorn Paeyo; Pichet Krungget
400m T53	T53	55.60	1	Canada	Brent Lakatos
400m T53	T53	55.60	1	France	Pierre Fairbank
400m T53	T53	55.60	1	South Korea	Yoo Byung-hoon
400m T53	T53	55.60	1	United States	Brian Siemann
400m T54	T54	49.00	2	China	Hu Yang; Dai Yunqiang
400m T54	T54	49.00	1	Great Britain	Nathan Maguire
400m T54	T54	49.00	1	Thailand	Athiwat Paeng-nuea
400m T62	T62	1:00.00	1	Netherlands	Olivier Hendriks
400m T62	T62	1:00.00	1	South Africa	Tebogo Mofokeng
400m T62	T62	1:00.00	1	United States	Blake Leeper

==== 800 metres ====
Event	Class(es)	Minimum Entry Standard (MES)	No. of athletes	NPC	Qualified
800m T34	T33; T34	2:03.00	1	China	Gong Wenhao
800m T34	T33; T34	2:03.00	1	Great Britain	Isaac Towers
800m T34	T33; T34	2:03.00	1	United Arab Emirates	Mohamed Hammadi
800m T53	T53	1:51.00	1	Thailand	Masaberee Arsae
800m T53	T53	1:51.00	1	Tunisia	Mohamed Nidhal Khelifi
800m T54	T54	1:37.00			

==== 1500 metres ====
Event	Class(es)	Minimum Entry Standard (MES)	No. of athletes	NPC	Qualified
1500m T11	T11	4:28.00	1	Ecuador	Jimmy Caicedo
1500m T11	T11	4:28.00	1	Ethiopia	Yitayal Yigzaw
1500m T11	T11	4:28.00	1	Poland	Aleksander Kossakowski
1500m T13	T12; T13	4:08.00	1	Algeria	Abdellatif Baka
1500m T13	T12; T13	4:08.00	1	Tunisia	Rouay Jebabli
1500m T13	T12; T13	4:08.00	1	Turkey	Mikail Al
1500m T20	T20	4:09.00	1	Great Britain	Ben Sandilands
1500m T20	T20	4:09.00	1	Italy	Ndiaga Dieng
1500m T20	T20	4:09.00	1	Portugal	Sandro Baessa
1500m T20	T20	4:09.00	1	United States	Michael Brannigan
1500m T38	T37; T38	4:42.00	2	Australia	Angus Hincksman; Reece Langdon
1500m T38	T37; T38	4:42.00	1	Algeria	Abdelkrim Krai
1500m T38	T37; T38	4:42.00	1	Canada	Nate Riech
1500m T38	T37; T38	4:42.00	1	Tunisia	Amen Allah Tissaoui
1500m T38	T37; T38	4:42.00	1	United States	Leo Merle
1500m T46	T45; T46	4:20.00	1	Australia	Michael Roeger
1500m T46	T45; T46	4:20.00	1	Bulgaria	Hristiyan Stoyanov
1500m T46	T45; T46	4:20.00	1	Denmark	Christian Lykkeby Olsen
1500m T46	T45; T46	4:20.00	1	France	Antoine Praud
1500m T46	T45; T46	4:20.00	1	Great Britain	Luke Nuttall
1500m T46	T45; T46	4:20.00	1	Kenya	Wesley Kimeli Sang
1500m T46	T45; T46	4:20.00	1	Neutral Paralympic Athletes	Aleksandr Iaremchuk
1500m T46	T45; T46	4:20.00	1	Tunisia	Bechir Agoubi
1500m T54	T53; T54	3:05.00	1	China	Jin Hua
1500m T54	T53; T54	3:05.00	1	Thailand	Putharet Khongrak

==== 5000 metres ====
Event	Class(es)	Minimum Entry Standard (MES)	No. of athletes	NPC	Qualified
5000m T11	T11	16:55.00	2	Brazil	Júlio César Agripino; Yeltsin Jacques
5000m T11	T11	16:55.00	2	Japan	Kenya Karasawa; Shinya Wada
5000m T13	T12; T13	15:57.00	1	Australia	Jaryd Clifford
5000m T13	T12; T13	15:57.00	1	Canada	Guillaume Ouellet
5000m T13	T12; T13	15:57.00	1	Morocco	Oussama Hmimsa
5000m T13	T12; T13	15:57.00	1	Neutral Paralympic Athletes	Anton Kuliatin
5000m T13	T12; T13	15:57.00	1	Spain	Yassine Ouhdadi
5000m T54	T53; T54	10:45.00	2	Thailand	Prawat Wahoram; Saichon Konjen
5000m T54	T53; T54	10:45.00	1	Great Britain	Daniel Sidbury
5000m T54	T53; T54	10:45.00	1	Japan	Masayuki Higuchi
5000m T54	T53; T54	10:45.00	1	Kuwait	Faisal Al-Rajehi
5000m T54	T53; T54	10:45.00	1	Switzerland	Marcel Hug

==== Marathon ====
Event	Class(es)	Minimum Entry Standard (MES)	No. of athletes	NPC	Qualified
Marathon T12	T11; T12	3:00:00			
Marathon T54	T52; T53; T54	1:35:00			

=== Men's field ===
==== Long jump ====
Event	Class(es)	Minimum Entry Standard (MES)	No. of athletes	NPC	Qualified
Long jump T11	T11	5.30m	3	China	Di Dongdong; Ye Tao; Chen Shichang
Long jump T11	T11	5.30m	1	Spain	Joan Munar
Long jump T11	T11	5.30m	1	Uzbekistan	Urganchbek Egamnazarov
Long jump T12	T12	6.10m	1	Azerbaijan	Said Najafzade
Long jump T12	T12	6.10m	1	Iran	Amir Khosravani
Long jump T12	T12	6.10m	1	Japan	Daiki Ishiyama
Long jump T12	T12	6.10m	1	Uzbekistan	Doniyor Saliev
Long jump T13	T13	5.60m	1	Azerbaijan	Orkhan Aslanov
Long jump T13	T13	5.60m	1	Great Britain	Zak Skinner
Long jump T13	T13	5.60m	1	Japan	Ryota Fukunaga
Long jump T13	T13	5.60m	1	Spain	Iván José Cano Blanco
Long jump T13	T13	5.60m	1	United States	Isaac Jean-Paul
Long jump T20	T20	6.20m	1	Canada	Noah Vucsics
Long jump T20	T20	6.20m	1	Ecuador	Roberto Chala
Long jump T20	T20	6.20m	1	Greece	Athanasios Prodromou
Long jump T20	T20	6.20m	1	Malaysia	Abdul Latif Romly
Long jump T20	T20	6.20m	1	Saudi Arabia	Hassan Dawshi
Long jump T36	T36	4.50m	2	Ukraine	Oleksandr Lytvynenko; Roman Pavlyk
Long jump T36	T36	4.50m	1	Neutral Paralympic Athletes	Evgenii Torsunov
Long jump T36	T36	4.50m	1	Uzbekistan	Izzat Turgunov
Long jump T37	T37	5.00m	1	Argentina	Brian Lionel Impellizzeri
Long jump T37	T37	5.00m	1	Brazil	Mateus Evangelista Cardoso
Long jump T37	T37	5.00m	1	France	Valentin Bertrand
Long jump T37	T37	5.00m	1	Greece	Konstantinos Kamaras
Long jump T37	T37	5.00m	1	Malaysia	Muhammad Nazmi Nasri
Long jump T38	T38	5.00m	1	China	Zhong Huanghao
Long jump T38	T38	5.00m	1	Great Britain	Karim Chan
Long jump T38	T38	5.00m	1	Neutral Paralympic Athletes	Khetag Khinchagov
Long jump T47	T45; T46; T47	6.25m	1	Cuba	Robiel Yankiel Sol Cervantes
Long jump T47	T45; T46; T47	6.25m	1	France	Arnaud Assoumani
Long jump T47	T45; T46; T47	6.25m	1	Neutral Paralympic Athletes	Nikita Kotukov
Long jump T47	T45; T46; T47	6.25m	1	Serbia	Nemanja Matijašević
Long jump T63	T42; T61; T63	4.40m	1	Denmark	Daniel Wagner
Long jump T63	T42; T61; T63	4.40m	1	Germany	Léon Schäfer
Long jump T63	T42; T61; T63	4.40m	1	Netherlands	Joël de Jong
Long jump T63	T42; T61; T63	4.40m	1	United States	Ezra Frech
Long jump T64	T44; T62; T64	5.70m	3	United States	Derek Loccident; Jarryd Wallace; Trenten Merrill
Long jump T64	T44; T62; T64	5.70m	1	France	Dimitri Pavadé
Long jump T64	T44; T62; T64	5.70m	1	Germany	Markus Rehm

==== High jump ====
Event	Class(es)	Minimum Entry Standard (MES)	No. of athletes	NPC	Qualified
High jump T47	T45; T46; T47	1.50m	2	United States	Roderick Townsend-Roberts; Dallas Wise
High jump T47	T45; T46; T47	1.50m	1	China	Chen Hongjie
High jump T47	T45; T46; T47	1.50m	1	France	Alexandre Dipoko-Ewane
High jump T47	T45; T46; T47	1.50m	1	India	Nishad Kumar
High jump T63	T42; T63	1.55m	2	India	Mariyappan Thangavelu; Shailesh Kumar
High jump T63	T42; T63	1.55m	1	Poland	Lukasz Mamczarz
High jump T64	T44; T64	1.50m	1	Great Britain	Jonathan Broom-Edwards
High jump T64	T44; T64	1.50m	1	India	Praveen Kumar
High jump T64	T44; T64	1.50m	1	Poland	Maciej Lepiato
High jump T64	T44; T64	1.50m	1	Uzbekistan	Temurbek Giyazov

==== Club throw ====
Event	Class(es)	Minimum Entry Standard (MES)	No. of athletes	NPC	Qualified
Club throw F32	F31; F32	25.00m	2	Algeria	Ahmed Mehideb; Walid Ferhah
Club throw F32	F31; F32	25.00m	2	China	Bo Qing; Liu Li
Club throw F51	F51	20.00m	3	Serbia	Filip Graovac; Aleksandar Radisic; Željko Dimitrijević
Club throw F51	F51	20.00m	1	Mexico	Mario Santana Ramos Hernández
Club throw F51	F51	20.00m	1	Slovakia	Marián Kuřeja

==== Discus throw ====
Event	Class(es)	Minimum Entry Standard (MES)	No. of athletes	NPC	Qualified
Discus throw F11	F11	29.00m	1	Austria	Bil Marinkovic
Discus throw F11	F11	29.00m	1	Italy	Oney Tapia
Discus throw F37	F37	39.00m	1	Australia	Guy Henly
Discus throw F37	F37	39.00m	1	Brazil	João Teixeira
Discus throw F37	F37	39.00m	1	Japan	Yamato Shimbo
Discus throw F37	F37	39.00m	1	Ukraine	Mykola Zhabnyak
Discus throw F37	F37	39.00m	1	Venezuela	Edwars Varela Meza
Discus throw F52	F51; F52	10.00m	2	Poland	Piotr Kosewicz; Rafał Rocki
Discus throw F52	F51; F52	10.00m	1	Brazil	André Rocha
Discus throw F52	F51; F52	10.00m	1	Latvia	Aigars Apinis
Discus throw F56	F54; F55; F56	34.00m	1	Brazil	Claudiney Batista
Discus throw F56	F54; F55; F56	34.00m	1	Greece	Konstantinos Tzounis
Discus throw F56	F54; F55; F56	34.00m	1	India	Yogesh Kathuniya
Discus throw F56	F54; F55; F56	34.00m	1	Slovakia	Dušan Laczkó
Discus throw F64	F43; F44; F62; F64	40.00m	2	Great Britain	Dan Greaves; Harrison Walsh
Discus throw F64	F43; F44; F62; F64	40.00m	2	United States	David Blair; Jeremy Campbell
Discus throw F64	F43; F44; F62; F64	40.00m	1	Croatia	Ivan Katanušić

==== Javelin throw ====
Event	Class(es)	Minimum Entry Standard (MES)	No. of athletes	NPC	Qualified
Javelin throw F13	F12; F13	43.00m	2	Iran	Ali Pirouj; Sajad Nikparast
Javelin throw F13	F12; F13	43.00m	1	Cuba	Ulicer Aguilera Cruz
Javelin throw F13	F12; F13	43.00m	1	Great Britain	Daniel Pembroke
Javelin throw F34	F33; F34	21.00m	2	Colombia	Mauricio Valencia; Diego Meneses
Javelin throw F34	F33; F34	21.00m	1	China	Zhang Zhongqiang
Javelin throw F34	F33; F34	21.00m	1	Iran	Saeid Afrooz
Javelin throw F38	F38	30.00m	2	Colombia	José Lemos; Luis Fernando Lucumí Villegas
Javelin throw F38	F38	30.00m	2	Ukraine	Vladyslav Bilyi; Oleksandr Doroshenko
Javelin throw F41	F40; F41	29.00m	1	China	Sun Pengxiang
Javelin throw F41	F40; F41	29.00m	1	India	Navdeep
Javelin throw F41	F40; F41	29.00m	1	Iran	Sadegh Beit Sayah
Javelin throw F41	F40; F41	29.00m	1	Iraq	Wildan Nukhailawi
Javelin throw F46	F45; F46	43.00m	3	India	Ajeet Singh; Rinku; Sundar Singh Gurjar
Javelin throw F46	F45; F46	43.00m	1	Cuba	Guillermo Varona Gonzalez
Javelin throw F46	F45; F46	43.00m	1	Sri Lanka	Dinesh Priyantha
Javelin throw F54	F53; F54	19.70m	1	Greece	Manolis Stefanoudakis
Javelin throw F54	F53; F54	19.70m	1	India	Abhishek Chamoli
Javelin throw F54	F53; F54	19.70m	1	Mexico	Edgar Ulises Fuentes
Javelin throw F54	F53; F54	19.70m	1	Slovakia	Ladislav Cuchran
Javelin throw F57	F56; F57	36.00m	1	Brazil	Cícero Valdiran Lins Nobre
Javelin throw F57	F56; F57	36.00m	1	France	Vitolio Kavakava
Javelin throw F57	F56; F57	36.00m	1	Iran	Amanolah Papi
Javelin throw F57	F56; F57	36.00m	1	Turkey	Muhammet Khalvandi
Javelin throw F57	F56; F57	36.00m	1	Uzbekistan	Yorkinbek Odilov
Javelin throw F64	F42 F61; F43 F62; F44 F63; F64	44.00m	1	Australia	Michal Burian
Javelin throw F64	F42 F61; F43 F62; F44 F63; F64	44.00m	1	France	Félicien Siapo
Javelin throw F64	F42 F61; F43 F62; F44 F63; F64	44.00m	1	India	Sumit Antil
Javelin throw F64	F42 F61; F43 F62; F44 F63; F64	44.00m	1	Morocco	Zakariae Ez Zouhri
Javelin throw F64	F42 F61; F43 F62; F44 F63; F64	44.00m	1	Sri Lanka	Dulan Kodithuwakku
Javelin throw F64	F42 F61; F43 F62; F44 F63; F64	44.00m	1	Vanuatu	Ken Kahu

==== Shot put ====
Event	Class(es)	Minimum Entry Standard (MES)	No. of athletes	NPC	Qualified
Shot put F11	F11	9.50m	2	Iran	Mahdi Olad; Amirhossein Alipour Darbeid
Shot put F11	F11	9.50m	1	Brazil	Alessandro Rodrigo Silva
Shot put F11	F11	9.50m	1	Croatia	Miljenko Vučić
Shot put F11	F11	9.50m	1	Neutral Paralympic Athletes	Igor Baskakov
Shot put F11	F11	9.50m	1	Spain	Alvaro Del Amo Cano
Shot put F12	F12	11.50m	2	Ukraine	Roman Danyliuk; Volodymyr Ponomarenko
Shot put F12	F12	11.50m	1	Latvia	Emīls Dzilna
Shot put F12	F12	11.50m	1	Serbia	Stefan Dimitrijevic
Shot put F12	F12	11.50m	1	Spain	Kim López González
Shot put F12	F12	11.50m	1	Uzbekistan	Elbek Sultonov
Shot put F20	F20	12.00m	2	Ukraine	Maksym Koval; Oleksandr Yarovyi
Shot put F20	F20	12.00m	1	France	Soane Luka Meissonnier
Shot put F20	F20	12.00m	1	Greece	Efstratios Nikolaidis
Shot put F20	F20	12.00m	1	Malaysia	Muhammad Ziyad Zolkefli
Shot put F32	F32	6.50m	1	Algeria	Lahouari Bahlaz
Shot put F32	F32	6.50m	1	Greece	Athanasios Konstantinidis
Shot put F32	F32	6.50m	1	Neutral Paralympic Athletes	Aleksei Churkin
Shot put F33	F33	6.90m	1	Algeria	Kamel Kardjema
Shot put F33	F33	6.90m	1	China	Cai Bingchen
Shot put F33	F33	6.90m	1	Croatia	Deni Cerni
Shot put F33	F33	6.90m	1	Italy	Giuseppe Campoccio
Shot put F33	F33	6.90m	1	Morocco	Zakariae Derhem
Shot put F34	F34	8.30m	1	Iran	Hadi Kaeidi
Shot put F34	F34	8.30m	1	Jordan	Ahmad Hindi
Shot put F34	F34	8.30m	1	Morocco	Azeddine Nouiri
Shot put F35	F35	8.50m	1	Argentina	Hernán Emanuel Urra
Shot put F35	F35	8.50m	1	China	Fu Xinhan
Shot put F35	F35	8.50m	1	Iran	Seyed Javanmardi
Shot put F35	F35	8.50m	1	Uzbekistan	Khusniddin Norbekov
Shot put F36	F36	9.00m	1	Germany	Sebastian Dietz
Shot put F36	F36	9.00m	1	Kazakhstan	Dastan Mukashbekov
Shot put F36	F36	9.00m	1	Mexico	José Román Ruiz
Shot put F36	F36	9.00m	1	Neutral Paralympic Athletes	Alan Kokoity
Shot put F36	F36	9.00m	1	Tunisia	Yassine Guenichi
Shot put F37	F37	11.00m	2	Uzbekistan	Kudratillokhon Marufkhujaev; Tolibboy Yuldashev
Shot put F37	F37	11.00m	1	Neutral Paralympic Athletes	Albert Khinchagov
Shot put F37	F37	11.00m	1	Poland	Jakub Mirosław
Shot put F37	F37	11.00m	1	Tunisia	Ahmed Ben Moslah
Shot put F40	F40	7.10m	1	Croatia	Matija Sloup
Shot put F40	F40	7.10m	1	Germany	Yannis Fischer
Shot put F40	F40	7.10m	1	Iraq	Garrah Tnaiash
Shot put F40	F40	7.10m	1	Neutral Paralympic Athletes	Denis Gnezdilov
Shot put F40	F40	7.10m	1	Portugal	Miguel Monteiro
Shot put F41	F41	8.20m	1	Germany	Niko Kappel
Shot put F41	F41	8.20m	1	Poland	Bartosz Tyszkowski
Shot put F41	F41	8.20m	1	United States	Hagan Landry
Shot put F41	F41	8.20m	1	Uzbekistan	Bobirjon Omonov
Shot put F46	F45; F46	11.50m	1	Canada	Greg Stewart
Shot put F46	F45; F46	11.50m	1	Croatia	Luka Baković
Shot put F46	F45; F46	11.50m	1	India	Sachin Sarjerao Khilari
Shot put F46	F45; F46	11.50m	1	South Africa	Kerwin Noemdo
Shot put F46	F45; F46	11.50m	1	United States	Josh Cinnamo
Shot put F53	F53	6.00m	2	Iran	Rashid Masjedi; Alireza Mokhtari
Shot put F53	F53	6.00m	1	Czech Republic	Aleš Kisý
Shot put F53	F53	6.00m	1	Georgia	Giga Ochkhikidze
Shot put F53	F53	6.00m	1	Morocco	Abdelillah Gani
Shot put F53	F53	6.00m	1	Ukraine	Viktor Lehkodukh
Shot put F55	F54; F55	9.50m	1	Azerbaijan	Olokhan Musayev
Shot put F55	F54; F55	9.50m	1	Brazil	Wallace Santos
Shot put F55	F54; F55	9.50m	1	Bulgaria	Ruzhdi Ruzhdi
Shot put F55	F54; F55	9.50m	1	Iran	Hamed Amiri
Shot put F55	F54; F55	9.50m	1	Poland	Lech Stoltman
Shot put F57	F56; F57	11.60m	1	Brazil	Thiago Paulino dos Santos
Shot put F57	F56; F57	11.60m	1	Finland	Teijo Kööpikkä
Shot put F57	F56; F57	11.60m	1	India	Soman Rana
Shot put F57	F56; F57	11.60m	1	Iran	Yasin Khosravi
Shot put F63	F42; F61; F63	11.20m	1	Brazil	Edenilson Roberto
Shot put F63	F42; F61; F63	11.20m	1	France	Badr Touzi
Shot put F63	F42; F61; F63	11.20m	1	Great Britain	Aled Davies
Shot put F63	F42; F61; F63	11.20m	1	Iran	Sajad Mohammadian
Shot put F63	F42; F61; F63	11.20m	1	Kuwait	Faisal Sorour

=== Women's track ===
==== 100 metres ====
Event	Class(es)	Minimum Entry Standard (MES)	No. of athletes	NPC	Qualified
100m T11	T11	14.50	1	Brazil	Jerusa Geber dos Santos
100m T11	T11	14.50	1	China	Liu Cuiqing
100m T11	T11	14.50	1	France	Delya Boulaghlem
100m T12	T12	14.30	2	Spain	Nagore Folgado García; Melani Bergés Gámez
100m T12	T12	14.30	1	Dominican Republic	Darlenys de la Cruz Severino
100m T13	T13	14.70	1	Azerbaijan	Lamiya Valiyeva
100m T13	T13	14.70	1	Canada	Bianca Borgella
100m T13	T13	14.70	1	Ireland	Orla Comerford
100m T13	T13	14.70	1	Spain	Adiaratou Iglesias Forneiro
100m T34	T33; T34	24.50	3	Great Britain	Hannah Cockroft; Kare Adenegan; Fabienne André
100m T34	T33; T34	24.50	1	China	Lan Hanyu
100m T34	T33; T34	24.50	1	United States	Eva Houston
100m T35	T35	19.50	1	Germany	Isabelle Foerder
100m T36	T36	17.30	1	Argentina	Araceli Rotela
100m T36	T36	17.30	1	China	Shi Yiting
100m T36	T36	17.30	1	Germany	Nicole Nicoleitzik
100m T36	T36	17.30	1	New Zealand	Danielle Aitchison
100m T37	T37	15.10	1	France	Mandy Francois-Elie
100m T37	T37	15.10	1	United States	Taylor Swanson
100m T38	T38	15.20	2	Great Britain	Madeline Down; Sophie Hahn
100m T38	T38	15.20	1	Australia	Rhiannon Clarke
100m T38	T38	15.20	1	Colombia	Darian Faisury Jiménez
100m T38	T38	15.20	1	Hungary	Luca Ekler
100m T47	T45; T46; T47	13.40	2	France	Angelina Lanza; Marie N'Gousso
100m T47	T45; T46; T47	13.40	1	Ecuador	Kiara Rodriguez
100m T47	T45; T46; T47	13.40	1	New Zealand	Anna Grimaldi
100m T47	T45; T46; T47	13.40	1	Serbia	Saška Sokolov
100m T47	T45; T46; T47	13.40	1	United States	Brittni Mason
100m T53	T53	20.00	2	China	Gao Fang; Zhou Hongzhuan
100m T54	T54	18.25	1	Finland	Amanda Kotaja
100m T54	T54	18.25	1	Mauritius	Noemi Alphonse
100m T63	T42; T63	19.60	3	Italy	Ambra Sabatini; Martina Caironi; Monica Graziana Contrafatto
100m T63	T42; T63	19.60	1	Great Britain	Didi Okoh
100m T63	T42; T63	19.60	1	Indonesia	Karisma Evi Tiarani
100m T64	T44; T62; T64	15.10	1	Canada	Marissa Papaconstantinou
100m T64	T44; T62; T64	15.10	1	Netherlands	Kiki Hendriks
100m T64	T44; T62; T64	15.10	1	Spain	Sara Andrés Barrio

==== 200 metres ====
Event	Class(es)	Minimum Entry Standard (MES)	No. of athletes	NPC	Qualified
200m T11	T11	30.70			
200m T12	T12	29.70	1	Germany	Katrin Mueller-Rottgardt
200m T12	T12	29.70	1	India	Simran Sharma
200m T35	T35	42.00	2	China	Zhou Xia; Guo Qianqian
200m T35	T35	42.00	1	Great Britain	Maria Lyle
200m T35	T35	42.00	1	Iraq	Fatimah Suwaed
200m T36	T36	37.00	1	Australia	Mali Lovell
200m T37	T37	32.80	1	France	Laure Ustaritz
200m T47	T45; T46; T47	28.30	1	Thailand	Sasirawan Inthachot
200m T64	T44; T64	33.00	1	Germany	Irmgard Bensusan
200m T64	T44; T64	33.00	1	Netherlands	Kimberly Alkemade
200m T64	T44; T64	33.00	1	Puerto Rico	Amaris Sofia Vazquez
200m T64	T44; T64	33.00	1	United States	Sydney Barta

==== 400 metres ====
Event	Class(es)	Minimum Entry Standard (MES)	No. of athletes	NPC	Qualified
400m T11	T11	1:12.00	2	Colombia	Angie Pabón; Ionis Salcedo
400m T11	T11	1:12.00	1	Brazil	Thalita Simplício
400m T11	T11	1:12.00	1	Namibia	Lahja Ishitile
400m T12	T12	1:08.00	1	Brazil	Lorraine Gomes de Aguiar
400m T12	T12	1:08.00	1	Cuba	Omara Durand
400m T12	T12	1:08.00	1	Iran	Hajar Safarzadeh Ghahderijani
400m T12	T12	1:08.00	1	Italy	Valentina Petrillo
400m T12	T12	1:08.00	1	Venezuela	Alejandra Paola Pérez López
400m T13	T13	1:09.00	1	Brazil	Rayane Soares da Silva
400m T13	T13	1:09.00	1	France	Nantenin Keita
400m T13	T13	1:09.00	1	Malawi	Taonere Banda
400m T13	T13	1:09.00	1	Portugal	Carolina Duarte
400m T20	T20	1:05.50	1	Ecuador	Lizanshela Angulo
400m T20	T20	1:05.50	1	India	Deepthi Jeevanji
400m T20	T20	1:05.50	1	Portugal	Carina Paim
400m T20	T20	1:05.50	1	Turkey	Aysel Önder
400m T20	T20	1:05.50	1	Ukraine	Yuliia Shuliar
400m T20	T20	1:05.50	1	United States	Breanna Clark
400m T37	T37	1:20.00	1	China	Jiang Fenfen
400m T37	T37	1:20.00	1	Colombia	Karen Palomeque
400m T37	T37	1:20.00	1	Neutral Paralympic Athletes	Viktoriia Slanova
400m T37	T37	1:20.00	1	South Africa	Sheryl James
400m T37	T37	1:20.00	1	Ukraine	Nataliia Kobzar
400m T38	T38	1:17.00	1	Colombia	Katty Hurtado
400m T38	T38	1:17.00	1	France	Sofia Pace
400m T38	T38	1:17.00	1	Germany	Lindy Ave
400m T38	T38	1:17.00	1	Great Britain	Ali Smith
400m T47	T45; T46; T47	1:10.00	2	Brazil	Fernanda Yara da Silva; Maria Clara Augusto
400m T47	T45; T46; T47	1:10.00	1	Canada	Amanda Rummery
400m T47	T45; T46; T47	1:10.00	1	China	Li Lu
400m T47	T45; T46; T47	1:10.00	1	Venezuela	Lisbeli Vera Andrade
400m T53	T53	1:10.00			
400m T54	T54	1:01.00	1	Belgium	Léa Bayekula
400m T54	T54	1:01.00	1	Great Britain	Melanie Woods

==== 800 metres ====
Event	Class(es)	Minimum Entry Standard (MES)	No. of athletes	NPC	Qualified
800m T34	T33; T34	2:50.00	1	China	Wang Yang
800m T53	T53	2:22.00	1	Australia	Angela Ballard
800m T53	T53	2:22.00	1	Great Britain	Samantha Kinghorn
800m T53	T53	2:22.00	1	Turkey	Hamide Doğangün
800m T54	T54	2:05.00	2	China	Zhou Zhaoqian; Luo Shuimei
800m T54	T54	2:05.00	1	United States	Tatyana McFadden

==== 1500 metres ====
Event	Class(es)	Minimum Entry Standard (MES)	No. of athletes	NPC	Qualified
1500m T11	T11	6:20.00	2	Kenya	Nancy Chelangat Koech; Mary Waithera Njoroge Imagen
1500m T11	T11	6:20.00	1	China	He Shanshan
1500m T11	T11	6:20.00	1	Ethiopia	Yayesh Tesfaw
1500m T11	T11	6:20.00	1	Poland	Joanna Mazur
1500m T11	T11	6:20.00	1	South Africa	Louzanne Coetzee
1500m T13	T12; T13	5:31.00	1	Ireland	Greta Streimikyte
1500m T13	T12; T13	5:31.00	1	Ethiopia	Tigist Mengistu
1500m T13	T12; T13	5:31.00	1	Morocco	Fatima El Idrissi
1500m T13	T12; T13	5:31.00	1	Tunisia	Somaya Bousaid
1500m T13	T12; T13	5:31.00	1	United States	Liza Corso
1500m T20	T20	5:15.00	1	Brazil	Antônia Keyla da Silva
1500m T20	T20	5:15.00	1	Great Britain	Hannah Taunton
1500m T20	T20	5:15.00	1	Poland	Barbara Bieganowska-Zając
1500m T20	T20	5:15.00	1	Ukraine	Liudmyla Danylina
1500m T54	T53; T54	3:47.00	1	Switzerland	Patricia Eachus

==== 5000 metres ====
Event	Class(es)	Minimum Entry Standard (MES)	No. of athletes	NPC	Qualified
5000m T54	T53; T54	13:30.00	2	Switzerland	Catherine Debrunner; Manuela Schär
5000m T54	T53; T54	13:30.00	1	China	Tian Yajuan
5000m T54	T53; T54	13:30.00	1	Germany	Merle Menje
5000m T54	T53; T54	13:30.00	1	Great Britain	Eden Rainbow-Cooper
5000m T54	T53; T54	13:30.00	1	United States	Susannah Scaroni

==== Marathon ====
Event	Class(es)	Minimum Entry Standard (MES)	No. of athletes	NPC	Qualified
Marathon T12	T11; T12	3:35:00	1	France	Rosario Murcia
Marathon T54	T52; T53; T54	1:58:00			

=== Women's field ===
==== Long jump ====
Event	Class(es)	Minimum Entry Standard (MES)	No. of athletes	NPC	Qualified
Long jump T11	T11	3.40m	1	Brazil	Lorena Salvatini Spoladore
Long jump T11	T11	3.40m	1	China	Zhou Guohua
Long jump T11	T11	3.40m	1	Spain	Alba Garcia Falagan
Long jump T11	T11	3.40m	1	Uzbekistan	Asila Mirzayorova
Long jump T12	T12	3.70m	1	Finland	Iida Lounela
Long jump T12	T12	3.70m	1	Japan	Uran Sawada
Long jump T12	T12	3.70m	1	Spain	Sara Martínez
Long jump T12	T12	3.70m	1	Ukraine	Oksana Zubkovska
Long jump T12	T12	3.70m	1	Uzbekistan	Yokutkhon Kholbekova
Long jump T20	T20	4.50m	3	Brazil	Zileide Cassiano da Silva; Jardenia Felix; Débora Oliveira de Lima
Long jump T20	T20	4.50m	1	Japan	Sonomi Sakai
Long jump T20	T20	4.50m	1	Poland	Karolina Kucharczyk
Long jump T37	T37	3.70m	1	China	Wen Xiaoyan
Long jump T37	T37	3.70m	1	France	Manon Genest
Long jump T37	T37	3.70m	1	Mauritius	Anaïs Angeline
Long jump T37	T37	3.70m	1	United States	Jaleen Roberts
Long jump T38	T38	3.80m	2	Germany	Nele Moos; Friederike Brose
Long jump T38	T38	3.80m	1	France	Lola Desfeuillet
Long jump T38	T38	3.80m	1	Great Britain	Olivia Breen
Long jump T38	T38	3.80m	1	Neutral Paralympic Athletes	Margarita Goncharova
Long jump T47	T45; T46; T47	4.50m	1	Denmark	Bjørk Nørremark
Long jump T47	T45; T46; T47	4.50m	1	United States	Taleah Williams
Long jump T47	T45; T46; T47	4.50m	1	Venezuela	Paola Del Valle Garcia
Long jump T63	T42; T61; T63	3.30m	1	Australia	Vanessa Low
Long jump T63	T42; T61; T63	3.30m	1	Denmark	Emilie Aaen
Long jump T63	T42; T61; T63	3.30m	1	France	Alexandra Nouchet
Long jump T63	T42; T61; T63	3.30m	1	Japan	Tomomi Tozawa
Long jump T63	T42; T61; T63	3.30m	1	Switzerland	Elena Kratter
Long jump T64	T44; T62; T64	3.80m	2	Netherlands	Fleur Jong; Marlene van Gansewinkel
Long jump T64	T44; T62; T64	3.80m	1	Japan	Maya Nakanishi
Long jump T64	T44; T62; T64	3.80m	1	United States	Beatriz Hatz

==== Club throw ====
Event	Class(es)	Minimum Entry Standard (MES)	No. of athletes	NPC	Qualified
Club throw F32	F31; F32	14.00m	1	Morocco	Oumaima Obraym
Club throw F32	F31; F32	14.00m	1	Poland	Róża Kozakowska
Club throw F32	F31; F32	14.00m	1	Tunisia	Maroua Brahmi
Club throw F32	F31; F32	14.00m	1	Ukraine	Anastasiia Moskalenko

==== Discus throw ====
Event	Class(es)	Minimum Entry Standard (MES)	No. of athletes	NPC	Qualified
Discus throw F11	F11	18.00m	2	China	Zhang Liangmin; Xue Enhui
Discus throw F11	F11	18.00m	1	Colombia	Yesenia Restrepo
Discus throw F11	F11	18.00m	1	Italy	Assunta Legnante
Discus throw F38	F37; F38	23.00m	1	Canada	Renee Foessel
Discus throw F38	F37; F38	23.00m	1	South Africa	Simone Kruger
Discus throw F41	F40; F41	19.00m	2	Morocco	Youssra Karim; Hayat El Garaa
Discus throw F41	F40; F41	19.00m	1	Ecuador	Estefany López
Discus throw F53	F51; F52; F53	6.00m	1	Brazil	Elizabeth Rodrigues
Discus throw F53	F51; F52; F53	6.00m	1	Iran	Elnaz Darabian Aghdas
Discus throw F53	F51; F52; F53	6.00m	1	Japan	Keiko Onidani
Discus throw F53	F51; F52; F53	6.00m	1	Ukraine	Zoia Ovsii
Discus throw F53	F51; F52; F53	6.00m	1	United States	Cassie Mitchell
Discus throw F55	F54; F55	15.50m	1	China	Dong Feixia
Discus throw F55	F54; F55	15.50m	1	Colombia	Érica Castaño
Discus throw F55	F54; F55	15.50m	1	Latvia	Diāna Krūmiņa
Discus throw F55	F54; F55	15.50m	1	Mexico	Rosa María Guerrero
Discus throw F57	F56; F57	20.00m	1	Algeria	Nassima Saifi
Discus throw F57	F56; F57	20.00m	1	China	Xu Mian
Discus throw F57	F56; F57	20.00m	1	Mexico	Floralia Estrada
Discus throw F57	F56; F57	20.00m	1	Uzbekistan	Mokhigul Khamdamova
Discus throw F64	F43; F44; F62; F64	20.00m	1	Australia	Sarah Edmiston
Discus throw F64	F43; F44; F62; F64	20.00m	1	China	Yao Juan
Discus throw F64	F43; F44; F62; F64	20.00m	1	Mexico	Osiris Machado
Discus throw F64	F43; F44; F62; F64	20.00m	1	Poland	Faustyna Kotłowska
Discus throw F64	F43; F44; F62; F64	20.00m	1	United States	Samantha Heyison

==== Javelin throw ====
Event	Class(es)	Minimum Entry Standard (MES)	No. of athletes	NPC	Qualified
Javelin throw F13	F12; F13	19.00m	1	Algeria	Bakhta Benallou
Javelin throw F13	F12; F13	19.00m	1	Austria	Natalija Eder
Javelin throw F13	F12; F13	19.00m	1	China	Zhao Yuping
Javelin throw F13	F12; F13	19.00m	1	Uzbekistan	Nozimakhon Kayumova
Javelin throw F34	F33; F34	12.50m	2	China	Zou Lijuan; Zuo Caiyun
Javelin throw F34	F33; F34	12.50m	1	Australia	Dayna Crees
Javelin throw F34	F33; F34	12.50m	1	Finland	Marjaana Heikkinen
Javelin throw F34	F33; F34	12.50m	1	Germany	Frances Herrmann
Javelin throw F46	F45; F46	23.00m	1	Great Britain	Hollie Arnold
Javelin throw F46	F45; F46	23.00m	1	New Zealand	Holly Robinson
Javelin throw F46	F45; F46	23.00m	1	Venezuela	Naibys Daniela Morillo Gil
Javelin throw F54	F53; F54	9.00m	1	India	Pooja
Javelin throw F54	F53; F54	9.00m	1	Montenegro	Maja Rajković
Javelin throw F54	F53; F54	9.00m	1	Nigeria	Flora Ugwunwa
Javelin throw F56	F55; F56	13.50m	1	Brazil	Raíssa Rocha Machado
Javelin throw F56	F55; F56	13.50m	1	China	Lin Sitong
Javelin throw F56	F55; F56	13.50m	1	Iran	Hashemiyeh Motaghian

==== Shot put ====
Event	Class(es)	Minimum Entry Standard (MES)	No. of athletes	NPC	Qualified
Shot put F12	F11; F12	9.00m	1	Great Britain	Lydia Church
Shot put F12	F11; F12	9.00m	1	Uzbekistan	Safiya Burkhanova
Shot put F20	F20	10.50m	1	Ecuador	Poleth Méndes
Shot put F20	F20	10.50m	1	France	Gloria Agblemagnon
Shot put F20	F20	10.50m	1	Great Britain	Sabrina Fortune
Shot put F20	F20	10.50m	1	Ukraine	Viktoria Shpachynska
Shot put F32	F32	3.50m	1	Algeria	Mounia Gasmi
Shot put F32	F32	3.50m	1	Australia	Rosemary Little
Shot put F32	F32	3.50m	1	Brazil	Wanna Brito
Shot put F32	F32	3.50m	1	Neutral Paralympic Athletes	Evgeniia Galaktionova
Shot put F33	F33	4.00m	2	China	Zao Qian; Wu Qing
Shot put F33	F33	4.00m	1	Algeria	Asmahane Boudjadar
Shot put F33	F33	4.00m	1	Australia	Maria Strong
Shot put F33	F33	4.00m	1	Mexico	Gilda Guadalupe Cota Vera
Shot put F33	F33	4.00m	1	Poland	Joanna Oleksiuk
Shot put F34	F34	5.70m	1	India	Bhagyashri Jadhav
Shot put F34	F34	5.70m	1	Morocco	Saida Amoudi
Shot put F34	F34	5.70m	1	Poland	Lucyna Kornobys
Shot put F35	F35	6.00m	1	China	Wang Jun
Shot put F35	F35	6.00m	1	Great Britain	Anna Nicholson
Shot put F35	F35	6.00m	1	Ukraine	Mariia Pomazan
Shot put F35	F35	6.00m	1	Uzbekistan	Dilafruzkhon Akhmatkhonova
Shot put F37	F37	8.00m	2	China	Li Yingli; Mi Na
Shot put F37	F37	8.00m	1	Australia	Ella Hose
Shot put F37	F37	8.00m	1	Neutral Paralympic Athletes	Irina Vertinskaya
Shot put F37	F37	8.00m	1	New Zealand	Lisa Adams
Shot put F40	F40	4.60m	1	Mexico	Pauleth Mejía Hernández
Shot put F40	F40	4.60m	1	Netherlands	Lara Baars
Shot put F40	F40	4.60m	1	Nigeria	Lauritta Onye
Shot put F40	F40	4.60m	1	Poland	Renata Sliwinska
Shot put F40	F40	4.60m	1	Tunisia	Raja Jebali
Shot put F40	F40	4.60m	1	United Arab Emirates	Maryam Alzeyoudi
Shot put F41	F41	6.00m	1	Argentina	Antonella Ruis Diaz
Shot put F41	F41	6.00m	1	Colombia	Mayerli Buitrago Ariza
Shot put F41	F41	6.00m	1	Tunisia	Raoua Tlili
Shot put F41	F41	6.00m	1	Uzbekistan	Kubaro Khakimova
Shot put F46	F45; F46	7.50m	1	China	Shi Gaiting
Shot put F46	F45; F46	7.50m	1	Japan	Yukika Saito
Shot put F46	F45; F46	7.50m	1	New Zealand	Holly Robinson
Shot put F46	F45; F46	7.50m	1	United States	Noelle Malkamaki
Shot put F54	F54	4.60m	1	Brazil	Elizabeth Rodrigues Gomes
Shot put F54	F54	4.60m	1	Chile	Francisca Mardones
Shot put F54	F54	4.60m	1	Iran	Elham Salehi
Shot put F54	F54	4.60m	1	Mexico	Gloria Zarza Guadarrama
Shot put F54	F54	4.60m	1	Uzbekistan	Nurkhon Kurbanova
Shot put F57	F56; F57	7.50m	1	Algeria	Safia Djelal
Shot put F57	F56; F57	7.50m	1	Mexico	María de los Ángeles Ortiz
Shot put F57	F56; F57	7.50m	1	Vanuatu	Ellie Enoch
Shot put F64	F42 F62; F43 F63; F44 F64	7.00m	2	United States	Samantha Heyison; Arelle Middleton
Shot put F64	F42 F62; F43 F63; F44 F64	7.00m	1	China	Yao Juan
Shot put F64	F42 F62; F43 F63; F44 F64	7.00m	1	Great Britain	Funmi Oduwaiye
Shot put F64	F42 F62; F43 F63; F44 F64	7.00m	1	Nigeria	Goodness Nwachukwu

=== Universal relay ===
Event	Class(es)	Minimum Entry Standard (MES)	Qualified NPC
4 × 100 m Universal Relay	T11-13; T33-34/T51-54; T35-38; T42-47/T61-64	—N/a	Brazil; Canada; China; Colombia; Great Britain; Indonesia; Japan; Neutral Paralympic Athletes

== See also ==
- Athletics at the 2024 Summer Olympics – Qualification
