= Athletics at the 2010 South American Games – Men's shot put =

The Men's Shot Put event at the 2010 South American Games was held on March 20, 2010.

== Medalists ==
| Gold | Silver | Bronze |
|---|---|---|
| Eder Moreno; Colombia | Nicolás Martina; Argentina | Michael Putman (Peru) Perú |

== Records ==
Standing records prior to the 2010 South American Games
| World record | Randy Barnes | United States | 23.12m | Los Angeles, United States | 20 May 1990 |
| World Leading | Scott Martin | Australia | 20.06m | Sydney, Australia | 27 February 2010 |
| South American record | Marco Antonio Verni | Chile | 21.14m | Santiago, Chile | 29 July 2004 |
| South American U23 record | Germán Lauro | Argentina | 19.78m | Buenos Aires, Argentina | 10 November 2006 |

== Results ==
Results were published.

=== Final ===
| Rank | Athlete | Nationality | Attempt | | | | | | Best Result | Notes |
| Rank | Athlete | Nationality | 1 | 2 | 3 | 4 | 5 | 6 | Best Result | Notes |
|---|---|---|---|---|---|---|---|---|---|---|
| 1st place, gold medalist(s) | Eder Moreno | Colombia | 17.62 | 18.27 | 18.31 | 18.32 | 18.46 | 18.45 | 18.46 | |
| 2nd place, silver medalist(s) | Nicolás Martina | Argentina | 17.06 | x | 17.67 | x | 16.90 | x | 17.67 | |
| 3rd place, bronze medalist(s) | Michael Putman | (Peru) Perú | 16.67 | 17.31 | 17.47 | 16.36 | 17.48 | 17.16 | 17.48 | |
| 4 | Diego Osorio | Chile | 16.71 | x | x | 16.82 | 16.93 | x | 16.93 | |
| 5 | Bruno Tapias | Brazil | 15.87 | 16.12 | 15.73 | x | 16.44 | 15.95 | 16.44 | |
| 6 | Matías López | Chile | 15.98 | x | 15.73 | 16.26 | 15.99 | 15.43 | 16.26 | |
| 7 | Luís Schneider | Brazil | 15.44 | x | 15.71 | 16.06 | 16.22 | x | 16.22 | |
| 8 | Josnner Ortiz | Venezuela | x | 16.15 | x | 15.77 | x | x | 16.15 | |
| 9 | Levin Moreno | Colombia | x | x | 13.94 | | | | 13.94 | |
| 10 | Juan Andrés Aguilera | Ecuador | 13.68 | 12.97 | x | | | | 13.68 | |

== See also ==
- 2010 South American Under-23 Championships in Athletics
