= Guatemala at the 2012 Summer Paralympics =

- IPC code: GUA
- NPC: Comité Paralimpico Guatemalteco

in London
- Competitors: 1 in 1 sport
- Medals: Gold 0 Silver 0 Bronze 0 Total 0

Summer Paralympics appearances (overview)
- 1976; 1980; 1984; 1988; 1992–2000; 2004; 2008; 2012; 2016; 2020; 2024

Guatemala competed at the 2012 Summer Paralympics in London, United Kingdom from August 29 to September 9, 2012.

== Athletics ==
Men’s Field Events

Athlete	Event	Distance	Points	Rank
Isaac Leiva	Shot Put F11-12	9.83	700	15
Isaac Leiva	Discus Throw F11	NM		

== See also ==
- Guatemala at the 2012 Summer Olympics
