= Athletics at the 2010 South American Games – Men's discus throw =

The Men's Discus Throw event at the 2010 South American Games was held on March 21 at 18:00.

== Medalists ==
Gold	Silver	Bronze
Andrés Rossini; Argentina	Michael Putman (Peru) Perú	Nicolás Martina; Argentina

== Records ==
Standing records prior to the 2010 South American Games
World record	Jürgen Schult	East Germany	74.08m	Neubrandenburg, Germany	6 June 1986
World Leading	Jorge Fernández	Cuba	66.00m	Havana, Cuba	11 March 2010
South American record	Jorge Balliengo	Argentina	66.32m	Rosario, Argentina	15 April 2006
South American U23 record	Ramón Jiménez Gaona	Paraguay	62.14m	Modesto, United States	11 May 1991

== Results ==
Results were published.

=== Final ===
Rank	Athlete	Nationality	Attempt						Best Result	Notes
Rank	Athlete	Nationality	1	2	3	4	5	6	Best Result	Notes
1st place, gold medalist(s)	Andrés Rossini	Argentina	52.23	53.91	56.28	51.61	53.55	x	56.28	
2nd place, silver medalist(s)	Michael Putman	(Peru) Perú	48.23	48.24	x	51.53	x	x	51.53	
3rd place, bronze medalist(s)	Nicolás Martina	Argentina	50.14	x	x	48.10	50.37	x	50.37	
4	Gerson Carvalho dos Santos	Brazil	40.66	46.14	38.11	49.86	48.58	47.92	49.86	
5	Juan Andrés Aguilera	Ecuador	x	44.32	48.62	45.62	47.85	x	48.62	
6	Levin Moreno	Colombia	47.91	48.61	43.60	46.93	46.04	46.37	48.61	
7	Luís Schneider	Brazil	x	46.18	48.01	46.14	46.72	47.52	48.01	
8	Luis Alberto Castro	Chile	46.85	45.47	x	45.32	x	x	46.85	
9	Felipe Nicolás Martínez	Chile	44.86	43.13	43.89				44.86	
–	Josnner Ortiz	Venezuela	x	x	x				NM	

== See also ==
- 2010 South American Under-23 Championships in Athletics
