= Guatemala at the 2020 Summer Paralympics =

- Flag of Guatemala
- IPC code: GUA

in Tokyo, Japan August 24, 2021 – September 5, 2021
- Competitors: 2 (1 man and 1 woman) in 1 sport and 3 events
- Flag bearers: Isaac Leiva Avila & Ericka Esteban
- Medals: Gold 0 Silver 0 Bronze 0 Total 0

Summer Paralympics appearances (overview)
- 1976; 1980; 1984; 1988; 1992–2000; 2004; 2008; 2012; 2016; 2020; 2024

Guatemala competed at the 2020 Summer Paralympics in Tokyo, Japan, from 24 August to 5 September 2021. This was their eighth appearance at the Summer Paralympics since 1976.

== Competitors ==
The following is the list of number of competitors participating in the Games:

Sport	Men	Women	Total
Athletics	1	1	2
Total	1	1	2

== Athletics ==
DNA: Did not advance

Men's field

Athlete	Event	Final	
Athlete	Event	Result	Rank
Isaac Leiva Avila	Shot put F11	8.41	11

Women's track

Athlete	Event	Heats		Final	
Athlete	Event	Result	Rank	Result	Rank
Ericka Violeta Esteban Villatoro	400 m T38	1:13.72	7	DNA	13

== See also ==
- Guatemala at the Paralympics
- Guatemala at the 2020 Summer Olympics
