= Guatemala at the Paralympics =

- IPC code: GUA
- NPC: Comité Paralimpico Guatemalteco
- Medals: Gold 1 Silver 0 Bronze 1 Total 2

Summer appearances
- 1976; 1980; 1984; 1988; 1992–2000; 2004; 2008; 2012; 2016; 2020; 2024

Guatemala have been irregular participants in the Paralympic Games. The country made its début at the 1976 Summer Paralympics in Toronto, with a delegation of eleven athletes to compete in archery, dartchery, swimming, table tennis and weightlifting. It was then absent in 1980, and returned in 1984, with a delegation of two swimmers and two weightlifters. It sent a single weightlifter to the 1988 Games, then was absent for sixteen years, before returning for the 2004 Paralympics, represented by two runners. Visually impaired 5,000m runner César López was the sole Guatemalan competitor in 2008. Guatemala has never taken part in the Winter Paralympics.

Guatemalans have, however, won two Paralympic medals. Weightlifter J.R. de Leon won his country's only medal during its inaugural participation in 1976, lifting 150 kg in the men's featherweight category, to take bronze. Guatemala's first (and so far only) gold medal also came in weightlifting, and was won by José Rolando, the only Guatemalan representative at the 1988 Games. Competing in the up to 57 kg category, he lifted 175 kg to become Paralympic champion.

== List of medallists ==
Medal	Name	Games	Sport	Event
Gold	José Rolando de León	1988 Seoul	Weightlifting	Men's Up To 57 kg
Bronze	José Rolando de León	1976 Toronto	Weightlifting	Men's Featherweight

== See also ==
- Guatemala at the Olympics
