= Gnezdilov =

Gnezdilov (Russian: Гнездилов) is a Russian masculine surname, its feminine counterpart is Gnezdilova. The surname may refer to the following notable people:

- Denis Gnezdilov (born 1986), Russian Paralympic athlete
- Svetlana Gnezdilov (born 1969), Ukrainian-born Israeli athlete
