= Jasur Khodjaev =

Uzbekistani Paralympic athlete (born 1994)

Personal information
- Nationality: Uzbekistani
- Born: 30 April 1994 (age 32)

Sport
- Country: Uzbekistan
- Sport: Para athletics
- Disability class: F32
- Event: Shot put
Medal record
Men's para-athletics
Representing Uzbekistan
World Championships
Gold medal – first place	2025 New Delhi	Shot put F32

Jasur Khodjaev (born 30 April 1994) is an Uzbekistani para-athlete who specializes in shot put.

== Career ==
Khodjaev competed in the 2025 World Para Athletics Championships held in New Delhi, where he won the gold medal in the shot put F32 event.
