= Guatemala at the 1988 Summer Paralympics =

- IPC code: GUA
- NPC: Comité Paralimpico Guatemalteco

in Seoul
- Competitors: 1
- Medals Ranked 38th: Gold 1 Silver 0 Bronze 0 Total 1

Summer Paralympics appearances (overview)
- 1976; 1980; 1984; 1988; 1992–2000; 2004; 2008; 2012; 2016; 2020; 2024

Guatemala competed at the 1988 Summer Paralympics in Seoul, South Korea. One competitor from Guatemala won a single gold medal and finished 38th medal table.

== See also ==
- Guatemala at the Paralympics
- Guatemala at the 1988 Summer Olympics
