= Marco Aurélio Borges =

Brazilian Paralympic athlete (born 1978)

Personal information
- Born: 5 January 1978 (age 48) São Paulo, Brazil

Sport
- Country: Brazil
- Sport: Para-athletics
Medal record
Men's para-athletics
Representing Brazil
Paralympic Games
Silver medal – second place	2020 Tokyo	Shot put F57
Parapan American Games
Silver medal – second place	2023 Santiago	Shot put F57

Marco Aurélio Borges (born 5 January 1978) is a Brazilian Paralympic athlete. He won the silver medal in the men's shot put F57 event at the 2020 Summer Paralympics in Tokyo, Japan. At the time, he won the bronze medal but this became the silver medal after Thiago Paulino dos Santos, also from Brazil, dropped from first to third place.
