= 2025 World Para Athletics Championships – Men's shot put =

The men's shot put events at the 2025 World Para Athletics Championships were held at the Jawaharlal Nehru Stadium, Delhi in New Delhi.

== Medalists ==
Event	Gold	Silver	Bronze
F11	Amirhossein Alipour Darbeid; Iran	Mahdi Olad; Iran	Álvaro del Amo Cano; Spain
F12	Volodymyr Ponomarenko; Ukraine	Emils Dzilna; Latvia	Stefan Dimitrijević; Serbia
F20	Oleksandr Yarovyi; Ukraine	Maksym Koval; Ukraine	Muhammad Ziyad Zolkefli; Malaysia
F32	Jasur Khodjaev; Uzbekistan	Athanasios Konstantinidis; Greece	Mohamed Nadjib Amchi; Algeria
F33	Deni Černi; Croatia	Aleksandr Khrupin; Neutral Paralympic Athletes	Kamel Kardjena; Algeria
F34	Mehran Nikoeimajd; Iran	Ahmad Hindi; Jordan	Mauricio Valencia; Colombia
F35	Seyed Aliasghar Javanmardi; Iran	Hernán Emanuel Urra; Argentina	Fu Xinhan; China
F36	Vladimir Sviridov; Neutral Paralympic Athletes	Yassine Guenichi; Tunisia	Alan Kokoity; Neutral Paralympic Athletes
F37	Albert Khinchagov; Neutral Paralympic Athletes	Aleksandr Belobokov; Neutral Paralympic Athletes	Tolibboy Yuldashev; Uzbekistan
F38	Levin Moreno; Colombia	José Lemos; Colombia	Michael Jenkins; Great Britain
F40	Denis Gnezdilov; Neutral Paralympic Athletes	Miguel Monteiro; Portugal	Garrah Tnaiash; Iraq
F41	Niko Kappel; Germany	Bobirjon Omonov; Uzbekistan	Aiaal Sivtsev; Neutral Paralympic Athletes
F46	Greg Stewart; Canada	Josh Cinnamo; United States	Luka Baković; Croatia
F53	Bartosz Górczak; Poland	Aleš Kisý; Czech Republic	Viacheslav Kaleev; Neutral Paralympic Athletes
F55	Ruzhdi Ruzhdi; Bulgaria	Nebojša Đurić; Serbia	Lech Stoltman; Poland
F57	Yasin Khosravi; Iran	Soman Rana; India	Teijo Kööpikkä; Finland
F63	Aled Davies; Great Britain	Faisal Sorour; Kuwait	Edenilson Floriani; Brazil

== F11 ==
Final

The event took place on 30 September.

Rank	Name	Nationality	Сlass	#1	#2	#3	#4	#5	#6	Result	Notes
1st place, gold medalist(s)	Amirhossein Alipour Darbeid	Iran	F11	13.18	14.59	14.44	14.52	x	14.34	14.59	CR
2nd place, silver medalist(s)	Mahdi Olad	Iran	F11	13.12	13.87	14.23	13.41	13.32	x	14.23	SB
3rd place, bronze medalist(s)	Álvaro del Amo Cano	Spain	F11	x	12.84	12.77	12.46	13.70	x	13.70	PB
4	Oney Tapia	Italy	F11	x	x	12.92	x	13.20	x	13.20	SB
5	Igor Baskakov	Neutral Paralympic Athletes	F11	12.26	12.64	12.53	12.74	12.99	11.15	12.99	SB
6	Alessandro Rodrigo Silva	Brazil	F11	11.77	x	12.02	x	x	10.91	12.02	
7	Sagar	India	F11	11.60	11.74	11.08	11.73	11.30	–	11.74	
8	Bil Marinkovic	Austria	F11	11.37	11.09	x	10.85	11.28	11.02	11.37	
9	Leonildo Carvalho	Portugal	F11	11.37	10.70	x				11.37	
10	Monu Ghangas	India	F11	10.53	10.76	10.87				10.87	
11	Rajab Chetty	Kenya	F11	x	10.19	9.77				10.19	
12	Roger Saavedra	Panama	F11	9.83	x	x				9.83	
13	Evgheni Iagudin	Moldova	F11	8.04	7.74	8.49				8.49	
	Clement Yuh Ndim	Cameroon	F11	DNS							

== F12 ==
Final

The event took place on 28 September.

Rank	Name	Nationality	Сlass	#1	#2	#3	#4	#5	#6	Result	Notes
1st place, gold medalist(s)	Volodymyr Ponomarenko	Ukraine	F12	14.00	17.39	15.45	x	15.83	–	17.39	WR
2nd place, silver medalist(s)	Emils Dzilna	Latvia	F12	16.51	x	x	15.21	14.84	16.63	16.63	PB
3rd place, bronze medalist(s)	Stefan Dimitrijević	Serbia	F12	13.11	13.67	13.63	13.70	14.01	14.23	14.23	
4	Petre Prundaru	Romania	F12	12.90	12.86	13.29	12.81	13.24	12.76	13.29	PB
5	Vladimir Butucea	Moldova	F12	10.18	10.13	10.29	9.86	9.88	x	10.29	

== F20 ==
Final

The event took place on 1 October.

Rank	Name	Nationality	Сlass	#1	#2	#3	#4	#5	#6	Result	Notes
1st place, gold medalist(s)	Oleksandr Yarovyi	Ukraine	F20	16.74	17.36	17.73	17.44	x	x	17.73	WR
2nd place, silver medalist(s)	Maksym Koval	Ukraine	F20	17.28	17.12	17.00	17.27	17.52	17.23	17.52	SB
3rd place, bronze medalist(s)	Muhammad Ziyad Zolkefli	Malaysia	F20	x	17.26	x	16.80	17.23	16.69	17.26	
4	Muhammet Atici	Turkey	F20	16.91	15.12	16.03	16.00	16.61	16.68	16.91	
5	Stalin David Mosquera	Ecuador	F20	x	16.37	16.14	x	x	15.75	16.37	SB
6	Soane Luka Meissonnier	France	F20	15.53	x	15.57	x	x	x	15.57	
7	Jordi Patricio Congo Villalba	Ecuador	F20	14.99	15.34	15.31	15.18	15.42	15.40	15.42	SB
8	Istvan Szollosi	Hungary	F20	13.77	13.93	x	13.89	14.09	13.86	14.09	

== F32 ==
Final

The event took place on 1 October.

Rank	Name	Nationality	Сlass	#1	#2	#3	#4	#5	#6	Result	Notes
1st place, gold medalist(s)	Jasur Khodjaev	Uzbekistan	F32	x	9.21	9.26	9.83	9.49	9.96	9.96	SB
2nd place, silver medalist(s)	Athanasios Konstantinidis	Greece	F32	8.71	8.91	9.37	x	8.97	9.65	9.65	
3rd place, bronze medalist(s)	Mohamed Nadjib Amchi	Algeria	F32	8.88	9.56	8.11	x	x	x	9.56	
4	Olavio Correia	Portugal	F32	8.93	9.35	x	9.29	8.61	8.75	9.35	PB
5	Walid Ferhah	Algeria	F32	8.45	x	9.02	x	x	9.18	9.18	
6	Ahmed Mehideb	Algeria	F32	8.60	x	7.86	8.81	x	8.85	8.85	
7	Dimitrios Zisidis	Greece	F32	x	8.33	8.34	8.72	x	8.75	8.75	
8	Mohammed Al Mashaykhi	Oman	F32	x	7.62	x	6.99	x	x	7.62	
9	Genadij Zametaskin	Lithuania	F32	5.70	5.32	5.61	5.57	5.33	5.78	5.78	
10	Saad Saad	Bahrain	F32	x	5.19	x	4.46	x	x	5.19	

== F33 ==
Final

The event took place on 5 October.

Rank	Name	Nationality	Сlass	#1	#2	#3	#4	#5	#6	Result	Notes
1st place, gold medalist(s)	Deni Černi	Croatia	F33	11.09	11.65	12.17	11.94	11.79	12.00	12.17	SB
2nd place, silver medalist(s)	Aleksandr Khrupin	Neutral Paralympic Athletes	F33	x	11.05	10.16	11.19	9.64	11.08	11.19	
3rd place, bronze medalist(s)	Kamel Kardjena	Algeria	F33	x	11.09	x	x	11.08	x	11.09	SB
4	Zakariae Derhem	Morocco	F33	x	10.53	x	10.62	10.20	10.89	10.89	
5	Hani Alnakhli	Saudi Arabia	F33	x	10.25	x	10.05	10.30	10.15	10.30	
6	Liu Li	China	F33	5.93	9.54	10.21	10.17	7.04	9.86	10.21	SB
7	Sarvarbek Normetov	Uzbekistan	F33	7.79	x	x	x	x	x	7.79	PB

== F34 ==
Final

The event took place on 5 October.

Rank	Name	Nationality	Сlass	#1	#2	#3	#4	#5	#6	Result	Notes
1st place, gold medalist(s)	Mehran Nikoee Majd	Iran	F34	12.02	11.49	11.43	11.83	12.06	12.27	12.27	WR
2nd place, silver medalist(s)	Ahmad Hindi	Jordan	F34	11.38	x	11.87	10.97	11.85	10.90	11.87	SB
3rd place, bronze medalist(s)	Mauricio Valencia	Colombia	F34	11.33	11.28	11.36	11.50	x	10.43	11.50	
4	Nikita Dubenchuk	Neutral Paralympic Athletes	F34	10.50	10.17	10.38	10.87	11.41	11.04	11.41	ER
5	Lin Wenbang	China	F34	11.01	x	10.44	10.69	11.22	x	11.22	=PB
6	Abdulrahman Abdulqadir Fiqi	Qatar	F34	10.79	10.67	x	10.95	10.72	10.93	10.95	SB
7	Diego Meneses	Colombia	F34	10.52	10.74	10.14	x	10.64	10.45	10.74	SB
8	Tomáš Horáček	Czech Republic	F34	10.39	10.19	10.14	x	10.43	10.31	10.43	PB
9	Muhsin Kaedi	Turkey	F34	9.70	9.81	9.74	x	9.85	10.07	10.07	SB
10	Karolis Virkutis	Lithuania	F34	8.41	8.50	x	8.05	8.64	8.28	8.64	SB

Qualification

The event took place on 4 October. Qualification: The 4 best performers (q) advance to the Final

Rank	Name	Nationality	Сlass	#1	#2	#3	Result	Notes
1	Abdulrahman Abdulqadir Fiqi	Qatar	F34	x	10.58	10.88	10.88	q, SB
2	Diego Meneses	Colombia	F34	10.55	10.01	10.59	10.59	q
3	Tomáš Horáček	Czech Republic	F34	10.37	x	x	10.37	q, PB
4	Karolis Virkutis	Lithuania	F34	8.41	8.16	8.05	8.41	q, SB
5	Eugenijus Vaicaitis	Lithuania	F34	8.36	x	8.33	8.36	
6	Naser Faraj	Kuwait	F34	7.24	8.11	8.13	8.13	
7	Georgios Vagiannopoulos	Greece	F34	6.54	6.16	6.48	6.54	SB
	Salman Abbariki	Refugee Paralympic Team	F34	DNS				

== F35 ==
Final

The event took place on 3 October.

Rank	Name	Nationality	Сlass	#1	#2	#3	#4	#5	#6	Result	Notes
1st place, gold medalist(s)	Seyed Aliasghar Javanmardi	Iran	F35	16.24	15.75	15.14	15.65	17.17	15.87	17.17	PB
2nd place, silver medalist(s)	Hernán Emanuel Urra	Argentina	F35	16.40	16.77	15.96	15.76	x	16.03	16.77	AM
3rd place, bronze medalist(s)	Fu Xinhan	China	F35	14.94	15.15	15.52	14.91	x	15.64	15.64	SB
4	Khusniddin Norbekov	Uzbekistan	F35	14.98	14.98	x	14.92	14.90	14.92	14.98	SB
5	Taimuraz Khabalov	Neutral Paralympic Athletes	F35	14.73	14.47	14.54	14.84	14.64	13.76	14.84	SB
6	Aleksandr Elmin	Neutral Paralympic Athletes	F35	x	13.96	13.77	13.39	13.87	x	13.96	SB
7	Yelaman Zholaman	Kazakhstan	F35	11.70	11.86	11.47	11.98	11.45	12.07	12.07	
8	Gheorghe Spinu	Moldova	F35	9.12	8.76	9.23	9.11	8.76	8.52	9.23	
9	Andrei Valentir	Moldova	F35	x	7.24	7.83				7.83	
10	Vladimir Samanov	Moldova	F35	7.42	7.62	7.32				7.62	

== F36 ==
Final

The event took place on 1 October.

Rank	Name	Nationality	Сlass	#1	#2	#3	#4	#5	#6	Result	Notes
1st place, gold medalist(s)	Vladimir Sviridov	Neutral Paralympic Athletes	F36	15.93	15.94	16.60	16.51	16.93	17.01	17.01	CR
2nd place, silver medalist(s)	Yassine Guenichi	Turkey	F36	16.57	16.74	x	x	x	16.93	16.93	AF
3rd place, bronze medalist(s)	Alan Kokoity	Neutral Paralympic Athletes	F36	16.33	16.36	15.65	16.20	15.23	16.86	16.86	PB
4	José Román Ruiz	Mexico	F36	15.10	15.30	14.60	x	14.51	14.65	15.30	SB
5	Dastan Mukashbekov	Kazakhstan	F36	x	14.41	x	14.18	15.00	15.22	15.22	SB
6	Barotjon Bakhtiyorov	Uzbekistan	F36	13.42	13.19	13.28	13.19	13.74	12.87	13.74	PB
7	Ivan Zaleznyak	Kazakhstan	F36	12.45	12.25	12.46	12.75	12.65	12.86	12.86	SB
8	Mohammed al Kaabi	United Arab Emirates	F36	12.02	12.25	12.00	12.25	12.55	12.63	12.63	SB

== F37 ==
Final

The event took place on 27 September.

Rank	Name	Nationality	Сlass	#1	#2	#3	#4	#5	#6	Result	Notes
1st place, gold medalist(s)	Albert Khinchagov	Neutral Paralympic Athletes	F37	15.66	16.55	16.12	15.86	16.52	x	16.55	CR
2nd place, silver medalist(s)	Aleksandr Belobokov	Neutral Paralympic Athletes	F37	15.73	16.05	15.13	15.95	16.16	16.03	16.16	SB
3rd place, bronze medalist(s)	Tolibboy Yuldashev	Uzbekistan	F37	12.80	14.77	14.09	14.63	15.52	15.86	15.86	PB
4	Luis Carlos López Valenzuela	Mexico	F37	14.87	14.36	x	14.71	14.91	14.55	14.91	AM
5	Guo Jiangluo	China	F37	13.63	13.77	x	13.49	14.19	x	14.19	PB
6	Bryan Leonel Enriquez	Mexico	F37	13.75	13.78	12.96	14.03	13.11	14.02	14.03	
7	Donatas Dundzys	Lithuania	F37	14.01	13.94	x	13.65	x	x	14.01	
8	Jakub Miroslaw	Poland	F37	13.29	13.16	13.62	13.56	12.98	13.48	13.62	
9	Manu	India	F37	12.69	13.43	13.28				13.43	
10	Kudratillokhon Marufkhujaev	Uzbekistan	F37	11.83	x	13.21				13.21	
11	Andrian Zabulica	Poland	F37	9.24	9.25	10.01				10.01	PB

== F38 ==
Final

The event took place on 4 October.

Rank	Name	Nationality	Сlass	#1	#2	#3	#4	#5	#6	Result	Notes
1st place, gold medalist(s)	Levin Moreno	Colombia	F38	20.38	20.11	20.15	20.09	19.45	x	20.38	WR
2nd place, silver medalist(s)	José Lemos	Colombia	F38	19.55	19.70	19.18	x	19.49	19.62	19.70	PB
3rd place, bronze medalist(s)	Michael Jenkins	Great Britain	F38	18.84	18.43	18.68	18.73	x	18.51	18.84	ER
4	Cameron Crombie	Australia	F38	15.30	15.91	x	x	15.06	14.04	15.91	SB
5	Vladyslav Bilyi	Ukraine	F38	13.97	13.63	x	x	x	x	13.97	SB
6	Petr Vrátil	Czech Republic	F38	10.84	10.41	10.93	x	x	10.72	10.93	
7	Timo Thielemans	Belgium	F38	10.37	10.05	10.89	10.46	10.28	10.43	10.89	PB

== F40 ==
Final

The event took place on 29 September.

Rank	Name	Nationality	Сlass	#1	#2	#3	#4	#5	#6	Result	Notes
1st place, gold medalist(s)	Denis Gnezdilov	Neutral Paralympic Athletes	F40	10.66	11.59	11.85	11.79	11.53	11.92	11.92	WR
2nd place, silver medalist(s)	Miguel Monteiro	Portugal	F40	10.92	11.31	10.93	x	10.18	11.11	11.31	SB
3rd place, bronze medalist(s)	Garrah Tnaiash	Iraq	F40	10.83	10.48	10.71	10.86	x	10.57	10.86	SB
4	Yannis Fischer	Germany	F40	x	10.55	10.63	x	x	x	10.63	
5	Dmitrii Dushkin	Neutral Paralympic Athletes	F40	9.86	9.79	x	9.88	10.13	9.81	10.13	SB
6	Ravi Rongali	India	F40	x	10.10	8.43	9.92	10.01	9.92	10.10	SB
7	Muhammad Diroy Noordin	Singapore	F40	9.63	9.41	9.92	9.64	9.92	x	9.92	SB
8	Wang Wei	China	F40	9.10	9.28	9.77	9.61	x	x	9.77	SB
9	Matija Sloup	Croatia	F40	9.30	9.20	9.54				9.54	
10	Mert Kılıç	Turkey	F40	7.99	8.25	7.96				8.25	
11	Sergiu Bors	Moldova	F40	5.19	4.96	4.90				5.19	

== F41 ==
Final

The event took place on 30 September.

Rank	Name	Nationality	Сlass	#1	#2	#3	#4	#5	#6	Result	Notes
1st place, gold medalist(s)	Niko Kappel	Germany	F41	12.55	13.34	13.25	13.21	x	x	13.34	
2nd place, silver medalist(s)	Bobirjon Omonov	Uzbekistan	F41	12.36	10.77	x	11.57	12.18	11.64	12.36	
3rd place, bronze medalist(s)	Aiaal Sivtsev	Neutral Paralympic Athletes	F41	11.95	11.39	11.61	11.55	x	11.98	11.98	
4	Jung Ji-song	South Korea	F41	10.34	10.67	10.67	10.63	x	10.32	10.67	SB
5	Wildan Nukhailawi	Iraq	F41	9.97	9.90	10.63	10.18	x	x	10.63	SB
6	Sun Pengxiang	China	F41	9.93	10.14	10.14	x	10.47	x	10.47	SB
7	Omer Faruk Ilkin	Turkey	F41	9.94	10.23	10.18	9.84	10.22	x	10.23	
8	Boburjon Isomiddinov	Uzbekistan	F41	9.17	9.47	9.55	x	9.58	9.79	9.79	PB
9	Álvaro Jiménez Alonso	Spain	F41	8.48	x	8.74				8.74	
10	Gurkan Uncuoglu	Turkey	F41	8.12	8.28	7.86				8.28	
	Huang Jun	China	F41	x	x	x				NM	

== F46 ==
Final

The event took place on 3 October.

Rank	Name	Nationality	Сlass	#1	#2	#3	#4	#5	#6	Result	Notes
1st place, gold medalist(s)	Greg Stewart	Canada	F46	14.72	15.40	16.68	16.25	16.49	x	16.68	SB
2nd place, silver medalist(s)	Josh Cinnamo	United States	F46	15.18	15.47	16.08	15.96	x	x	16.08	
3rd place, bronze medalist(s)	Luka Baković	Croatia	F46	15.00	x	15.83	15.47	15.24	15.39	15.83	SB
4	Sachin Khilari	India	F46	x	14.87	14.97	15.03	14.81	15.00	15.03	
5	Andrius Skuja	Lithuania	F46	14.53	14.03	13.84	14.99	x	14.84	14.99	SB
6	Mohd Yasser	India	F46	13.96	13.82	14.50	x	14.73	14.67	14.73	
7	Wei Enlong	China	F46	12.89	13.63	13.74	14.32	14.08	x	14.32	SB
8	Parveen	India	F46	13.83	13.52	x	13.81	14.03	14.24	14.24	
9	Erik Fabian Kaurin	Croatia	F46	x	x	13.72				13.72	
10	Raivo Maksims	Latvia	F46	13.08	x	x				13.08	SB

== F53 ==
Final

The event took place on 29 September.

Rank	Name	Nationality	Сlass	#1	#2	#3	#4	#5	#6	Result	Notes
1st place, gold medalist(s)	Bartosz Górczak	Poland	F53	8.41	8.46	8.41	8.61	8.52	8.67	8.67	CR
2nd place, silver medalist(s)	Aleš Kisý	Czech Republic	F53	7.76	8.02	8.06	7.74	8.11	8.20	8.20	SB
3rd place, bronze medalist(s)	Viacheslav Kaleev	Neutral Paralympic Athletes	F53	8.04	7.39	8.02	8.10	x	8.13	8.13	SB
4	Anton Fedulov	Neutral Paralympic Athletes	F53	7.33	7.83	7.88	7.92	x	7.71	7.92	PB
5	Ayush Verma	India	F53	6.80	6.90	7.23	6.97	7.03	7.00	7.23	PB
6	Hamza Kais	Algeria	F53	6.79	x	6.55	x	x	6.72	6.79	
7	Davit Chankseliani	Georgia	F53	6.68	6.53	x	x	x	x	6.68	
	Alireza Mokhtari	Iran	F53	x	x	x	x	x	x	NM	

== F55 ==
Final

The event took place on 28 September.

Rank	Name	Nationality	Сlass	#1	#2	#3	#4	#5	#6	Result	Notes
1st place, gold medalist(s)	Ruzhdi Ruzhdi	Bulgaria	F55	12.38	12.56	12.72	12.78	12.61	12.94	12.94	WR
2nd place, silver medalist(s)	Nebojša Đurić	Serbia	F55	12.15	12.24	12.34	12.21	12.52	12.46	12.52	PB
3rd place, bronze medalist(s)	Lech Stoltman	Poland	F55	11.55	11.98	12.00	12.02	11.90	11.93	12.02	SB
4	Sergei Sokulskii	Neutral Paralympic Athletes	F54	11.52	11.82	11.98	11.98	11.92	11.80	11.98	CR
5	Johnatan Abel Salinas	Mexico	F54	9.37	11.12	11.30	11.43	11.66	11.00	11.66	AM
6	Zafar Zaker	Iran	F55	11.47	11.41	11.65	11.44	11.55	11.56	11.65	
7	Olokhan Musayev	Azerbaijan	F55	10.86	10.97	11.09	11.19	11.28	x	11.28	SB
8	Zamir Shkakhov	Neutral Paralympic Athletes	F55	10.78	x	10.73	10.92	10.58	11.04	11.04	
9	Damian Ligeza	Poland	F55	10.61	10.67	10.42	10.66	10.92	10.66	10.92	
10	Ramunas Verbavicius	Lithuania	F55	10.63	10.80	10.59	10.82	10.71	10.89	10.89	SB

Qualification

The event took place on 27 September. Qualification: The 4 best performers (q) advance to the Final

Rank	Name	Nationality	Сlass	#1	#2	#3	Result	Notes
1	Zamir Shkakhov	Neutral Paralympic Athletes	F55	11.21	11.39	11.59	11.59	q, PB
2	Sergei Sokulskii	Neutral Paralympic Athletes	F54	9.90	11.11	11.56	11.56	q, CR
3	Olokhan Musayev	Azerbaijan	F55	8.20	x	11.27	11.27	q, SB
4	Ramunas Verbavicius	Lithuania	F55	x	10.48	10.58	10.58	q, =SB
5	Obay Assʿad	Jordan	F55	x	10.04	x	10.04	SB
6	Francisco Leonardo Cedeno	Panama	F55	x	x	9.74	9.74	
7	Mohammad Zikri Zakaria	Malaysia	F55	9.66	x	x	9.66	SB
8	Kenny Pacheco	Peru	F55	9.09	x	8.83	9.09	
9	Ivan Revenko	Neutral Paralympic Athletes	F54	8.87	8.97	x	8.97	SB
10	Himal Aryal	Nepal	F55	x	6.26	x	6.26	PB

== F57 ==
Final

The event took place on 4 October.

Rank	Name	Nationality	Сlass	#1	#2	#3	#4	#5	#6	Result	Notes
1st place, gold medalist(s)	Yasin Khosravi	Iran	F57	15.18	15.79	15.65	15.81	15.94	16.60	16.60	WR
2nd place, silver medalist(s)	Thiago Paulino dos Santos	Brazil	F57	14.47	14.57	14.35	14.82	14.42	14.62	14.82	SB
3rd place, bronze medalist(s)	Soman Rana	India	F57	x	14.31	14.27	14.69	14.34	14.38	14.69	SB
4	Teijo Kööpikkä	Finland	F57	13.66	14.30	x	14.42	x	14.47	14.47	
5	Haidr Salamh	Saudi Arabia	F57	x	x	x	14.47	13.27	14.18	14.47	
6	Hokato Hotozhe Sema	India	F57	13.11	13.41	13.81	13.44	13.69	14.35	14.35	SB
7	Shubham Juyal	India	F57	13.17	13.08	13.10	12.57	13.23	13.72	13.72	PB
8	Aligadzhi Abdurakhimov	Neutral Paralympic Athletes	F57	12.78	12.75	13.52	12.84	12.94	13.12	13.52	PB
9	Samir Nabiyev	Azerbaijan	F57	12.71	12.95	12.74	13.08	12.62	12.97	13.08	
10	Yorkinbek Odilov	Uzbekistan	F57	12.55	12.95	12.71	11.93	12.54	12.68	12.95	

Qualification

The event took place on 3 October. Qualification: The 4 best performers (q) advance to the Final

Rank	Name	Nationality	Сlass	#1	#2	#3	Result	Notes
1	Shubham Juyal	India	F57	12.89	13.04	13.34	13.34	q, PB
2	Samir Nabiyev	Azerbaijan	F57	12.91	11.75	13.22	13.22	q, SB
3	Yorkinbek Odilov	Uzbekistan	F57	12.25	13.08	12.93	13.08	q, PB
4	Aligadzhi Abdurakhimov	Neutral Paralympic Athletes	F57	12.59	12.68	13.02	13.02	q, PB
5	Ramunas Rojus	Lithuania	F57	11.30	11.68	12.27	12.27	
6	David Fernández Fernández	Spain	F57	11.89	12.07	11.79	12.07	SB
7	Vitolio Kavakava	France	F57	12.07	x	x	12.07	
8	Hussein Khazaee	Iraq	F57	10.99	11.10	11.34	11.34	SB
9	Sargis Mkhitaryan	Armenia	F57	10.35	10.21	10.18	10.35	

== F63 ==
Final

The event took place on 5 October.

Rank	Name	Nationality	Сlass	#1	#2	#3	#4	#5	#6	Result	Notes
1st place, gold medalist(s)	Aled Davies	Great Britain	F42	15.20	14.92	15.01	15.66	16.44	15.66	16.44	
2nd place, silver medalist(s)	Faisal Sorour	Kuwait	F42	14.47	x	15.16	15.87	16.19	16.28	16.28	AS
3rd place, bronze medalist(s)	Edenilson Floriani	Brazil	F42	x	14.64	14.96	14.86	14.89	14.84	14.96	AM
4	Palitha Bandara	Sri Lanka	F42	13.83	13.83	13.19	13.49	14.07	13.68	14.07	SB
5	Mukhammad Rikhsimov	Uzbekistan	F42	12.12	13.61	x	13.97	x	x	13.97	SB
6	Georg Schober	Austria	F63	12.62	13.61	13.17	13.59	13.63	13.39	13.63	PB
7	Nicolás Castro	Chile	F42	12.31	12.74	12.80	12.98	12.82	12.40	12.98	PB
8	Martin Adamčík	Czech Republic	F63	10.87	11.10	x	x	11.66	x	11.66	PB
	William Tchuisseu Tchapo	Cameroon	F42	DNS							
