= Tomasz Pauliński =

Polish Paralympic athlete (born 1989)

Personal information
- Born: 27 May 1989 (age 37) Bydgoszcz, Poland

Sport
- Country: Poland
- Sport: Para athletics
- Disability: Cerebral palsy
- Disability class: F34
- Event: Shot put
Medal record
Para athletics
Representing Poland
World Championships
Gold medal – first place	2013 Lyon	Shot put F35
European Championships
Gold medal – first place	2018 Berlin	Shot put F34
Silver medal – second place	2014 Swansea	Shot put F35
Silver medal – second place	2021 Bydgoszcz	Shot put F34
Bronze medal – third place	2016 Grosseto	Shot put F35

Tomasz Pauliński (born 27 May 1989) is a Polish Paralympic athlete who competes in shot put at international track and field competitions. He is a World champion and a European champion, he competed at the 2020 Summer Paralympics where he finished in fourth place in the shot put F34. He is also the European record holder for the shot put in his sports classification.
