= Michael Jenkins (athlete) =

Welsh para athlete (born 2004)

Personal information
- Nationality: Welsh
- Born: 27 October 2004 (age 21)

Sport
- Sport: Para-athletics
- Disability: cerebral palsy
- Disability class: F38
- Event: shot put
- Club: Pembrokeshire Harriers
- Coached by: Ryan Spencer-Jones
Medal record
Men's para athletics
Representing Great Britain
World Championships
Silver medal – second place	2023 Paris	Shot put F38
Bronze medal – third place	2025 New Delhi	Shot put F38

Michael Jenkins (born 27 October 2004) is a Welsh para athlete who specializes in shot put.

== Career ==
Jenkins competed at the 2023 World Para Athletics Championships and won a silver medal in the shot put F46 event with a European record throw of 17.14 metres, He again competed at the 2025 World Para Athletics Championships and won a bronze medal in the shot put F46 event.

== Personal life ==
Jenkins was diagnosed with cerebral palsy.
