= Guatemala at the 2004 Summer Paralympics =

- IPC code: GUA
- NPC: Comité Paralimpico Guatemalteco

in Athens
- Competitors: 2 in 1 sport
- Flag bearer: Cesar Lopez
- Medals: Gold 0 Silver 0 Bronze 0 Total 0

Summer Paralympics appearances (overview)
- 1976; 1980; 1984; 1988; 1992–2000; 2004; 2008; 2012; 2016; 2020; 2024

Guatemala competed at the 2004 Summer Paralympics in Athens, Greece. The team included one man and one woman, but won no medals.

== Sports ==
=== Athletics ===
==== Men's track ====
Athlete	Class	Event	Heats		Semifinal		Final	
Athlete	Class	Event	Result	Rank	Result	Rank	Result	Rank
Cesar Lopez	T13	400m	—				58.27	6

==== Women's track ====
Athlete	Class	Event	Heats		Semifinal		Final	
Athlete	Class	Event	Result	Rank	Result	Rank	Result	Rank
Alva Yovadina Puac	T54	100m	19.74	10	did not advance			

== See also ==
- Guatemala at the Paralympics
- Guatemala at the 2004 Summer Olympics
