= Athletics at the 2020 Summer Paralympics – Men's shot put =

The Men's shot put athletics events for the 2020 Summer Paralympics took place at the Tokyo National Stadium from August 27 to September 4, 2021. A total of 16 events were contested in this discipline.

== Schedule ==
R	Round 1	½	Semifinals	F	Final

Date	Fri 27		Sat 28		Sun 29		Mon 30		Tue 31		Wed 1		Thu 2		Fri 3		Sat 4	
Event	M	E	M	E	M	E	M	E	M	E	M	E	M	E	M	E	M	E
F11								F										
F12			F															
F20										F								
F32										F								
F33																		F
F34																	F	
F35														F				
F36									F									
F37		F																
F40					F													
F41							F											
F46											F							
F53					F													
F55		F																
F57																F		
F63																		F

== Medal summary ==
The following is a summary of the medals awarded across all shot put events.

Classification	Gold		Silver		Bronze	
F11	Mahdi Olad; Iran	14.43	Alessandro Rodrigo da Silva; Brazil	13.89	Oney Tapia; Italy	13.60
F12	Kim López González; Spain	17.04 WR	Roman Danyliuk; Ukraine	16.53	Elbek Sultonov; Uzbekistan	15.94
F20	Maksym Koval; Ukraine	17.34 WR	Oleksandr Yarovyi; Ukraine	17.30 PB	Efstratios Nikolaidis; Greece	15.93
F32	Liu Li; China	12.97 WR	Aleksei Churkin; RPC	11.31 AR	Mohammed Al Mashaykhi; Oman	10.84
F33	Zakariae Derhem; Morocco	11.37 GR	Kamel Kardjena; Algeria	11.34	Deni Černi; Croatia	11.25
F34	Ahmad Hindi; Jordan	12.25 WR	Azeddine Nouiri; Morocco	11.55 AR	Abdulrahman Abdulqadir Fiqi; Qatar	11.36
F35	Khusniddin Norbekov; Uzbekistan	16.13	Hernán Emanuel Urra; Argentina	15.90 AR	Fu Xinhan; China	15.41
F36	Vladimir Sviridov; RPC	16.67 WR	Yassine Guenichi; Tunisia	15.12 AR	Sebastian Dietz; Germany	14.81
F37	Albert Khinchagov; RPC	15.78	Ahmed Ben Moslah; Tunisia	14.50 AR	João Victor Teixeira de Souza Silva; Brazil	14.45 AR
F40	Denis Gnezdilov; RPC	11.16 WR	Garrah Tnaiash; Iraq	11.15 AR	Miguel Monteiro; Portugal	10.76
F41	Bobirjon Omonov; Uzbekistan	14.06 GR	Hagan Landry; United States	13.88 AR	Niko Kappel; Germany	13.30
F46	Greg Stewart; Canada	16.75 GR	Nikita Prokhorov; RPC	16.29 AR	Joshua Cinnamo; United States	15.90
F53	Elvin Astanov; Azerbaijan	8.77 GR	Alireza Mokhtari Hemami; Iran	8.48	Aleš Kisý; Czech Republic	8.25
F55	Wallace Santos; Brazil	12.63 WR	Ruzhdi Ruzhdi; Bulgaria	12.23	Lech Stoltman; Poland	12.15
F57	Wu Guoshan; China	15.00 GR	Marco Aurélio Borges; Brazil	14.85	Thiago Paulino dos Santos; Brazil	14.77
F63	Aled Davies; Great Britain	15.33	Sajad Mohammadian; Iran	14.88	Faisal Sorour; Kuwait	14.13

== Results ==
=== F11 ===
Records

Prior to this competition, the existing world, Paralympic, and area records were as follows:

World record	David Casinos (ESP)	15.26	Sydney, Australia	20 October 2000
Paralympic record	David Casinos (ESP)	15.26	Sydney, Australia	20 October 2000

Area	Distance (m)	Athlete	Nation
Africa	11.30	Amir Soltane	Tunisia
America	13.99	Alessandro Rodrigo da Silva	Brazil
Asia	14.44	Mahdi Olad	Iran
Europe	15.26 WR	David Casinos	Spain
Oceania	8.67	Ben Theodore	Papua New Guinea

Results

The final in this classification took place on 30 August 2021, at 19:46:

Rank	Athlete	Nationality	1	2	3	4	5	6	Best	Notes
1st place, gold medalist(s)	Mahdi Olad	Iran	13.53	14.12	14.01	14.40	14.43	13.79	14.43	SB
2nd place, silver medalist(s)	Alessandro Rodrigo da Silva	Brazil	13.85	13.56	12.59	13.39	13.87	13.89	13.89	SB
3rd place, bronze medalist(s)	Oney Tapia	Italy	13.05	12.67	13.42	13.16	x	13.60	13.60	PB
4	Miljenko Vučić	Croatia	13.13	x	x	13.17	12.95	x	13.17	
5	Igor Baskakov	RPC	11.71	12.10	12.34	12.64	x	12.83	12.83	
6	Nourmohammad Arekhi	Iran	12.78	12.47	x	12.47	12.44	x	12.78	SB
7	Sergei Shatalov	RPC	12.31	x	12.32	12.54	12.24	12.59	12.59	
8	Mirosław Madzia	Poland	11.72	12.59	11.38	12.41	12.26	12.26	12.59	PB
9	Alvaro del Amo Cano	Spain	11.46	12.16	11.70	Did not advance			12.16	
10	Miloš Spaić	Montenegro	10.99	x	10.01	Did not advance			10.99	SB
11	Isaac Leiva Avila	Guatemala	x	8.39	8.41	Did not advance			8.41	

=== F12 ===
Records

Prior to this competition, the existing world, Paralympic, and area records were as follows:

World record	Kim López González (ESP)	17.02	Bydgoszcz, Poland	1 June 2021
Paralympic record	Sun Hai Tao (CHN)	16.62	Athens, Greece	21 September 2004

Area	Distance (m)	Athlete	Nation
Africa	12.98	Hermanus Blom	South Africa
America	16.35	Caio Vinicius da Silva Pereira	Brazil
Asia	16.62 PR	Sun Hai Tao	China
Europe	17.02 WR	Kim López González	Spain
Oceania	15.57	Russell Short	Australia

Results

The final in this classification took place on 28 August 2021, at 9:35:

Rank	Athlete	Nationality	1	2	3	4	5	6	Best	Notes
1st place, gold medalist(s)	Kim López González	Spain	x	16.51	16.81	16.78	17.04	x	17.04	WR
2nd place, silver medalist(s)	Roman Danyliuk	Ukraine	16.33	16.53	16.27	x	16.44	15.72	16.53	SB
3rd place, bronze medalist(s)	Elbek Sultonov	Uzbekistan	15.55	15.27	x	x	15.94	x	15.94	PB
4	Volodymyr Ponomarenko	Ukraine	14.25	x	14.17	x	14.96	14.58	14.96	SB
5	Saman Pakbaz	Iran	12.05	14.28	x	x	14.29	14.24	14.29	
6	Marek Wietecki	Poland	13.00	12.90	13.47	13.03	x	13.35	13.47	SB
7	Héctor Cabrera Llácer	Spain	12.25	12.48	13.03	x	x	12.67	13.03	SB
8	Vladimir Butucea	Moldova	10.46	x	11.15	10.48	11.62	x	11.62	PB

=== F20 ===
Records

Prior to this competition, the existing world, Paralympic, and area records were as follows:

World record	Muhammad Ziyad Zolkefli (MAS)	17.29	London, United Kingdom	15 July 2017
Paralympic record	Muhammad Ziyad Zolkefli (MAS)	16.84	Rio de Janeiro, Brazil	10 September 2016

Area	Distance (m)	Athlete	Nation
Africa	11.99	Mohamed Ali Fatnassi	Tunisia
America	16.72	Stalin David Mosquera	Ecuador
Asia	17.29 WR	Muhammad Ziyad Zolkefli	Malaysia
Europe	17.11	Maksym Koval	Ukraine
Oceania	16.29	Todd Hodgetts	Australia

Results

The final in this classification took place on 31 August 2021, at 19:05:

Villalba, Hodgetts and Zolkefli were disqualified for arriving late to the call room. They were allowed to compete, but were marked as DNS (Did Not Start). Zolkefli's best distance of 17.94m was further than the winner's.

Rank	Athlete	Nationality	1	2	3	4	5	6	Best	Notes
1st place, gold medalist(s)	Maksym Koval	Ukraine	16.97	16.82	17.34	16.85	16.72	x	17.34	WR
2nd place, silver medalist(s)	Oleksandr Yarovyi	Ukraine	17.14	17.30	x	x	17.13	x	17.30	PB
3rd place, bronze medalist(s)	Efstratios Nikolaidis	Greece	x	15.93	x	x	x	x	15.93	
4	Leontios Stefanidis	Greece	15.75	x	15.41	x	15.50	x	15.75	PB
5	István Szőllősi	Hungary	12.66	13.59	13.42	x	13.54	13.14	13.59	SB
-	Jordi Patricio Congo Villalba	Ecuador	-	-	-	-	-	-	DNS	
-	Todd Hodgetts	Australia	-	-	-	-	-	-	DNS	
-	Muhammad Ziyad Zolkefli	Malaysia	-	-	-	-	-	-	DNS	

=== F32 ===
Records

Prior to this competition, the existing world, Paralympic, and area records were as follows:

World record	Liu Li (CHN)	12.05	Dubai, United Arab Emirates	13 November 2019
Paralympic record	Athanasios Konstantinidis (GRE)	10.39	Rio de Janeiro, Brazil	8 September 2016

Area	Distance (m)	Athlete	Nation
Africa	11.08	Lahouari Bahlaz	Algeria
America	6.28	Edilberto Andres Cruz Moreno	Colombia
Asia	12.05 WR	Liu Li	China
Europe	11.16	Aleksei Churkin	Russia
Oceania	Vacant		

Results

The final in this classification took place on 31 August 2021, at 19:19:

Rank	Athlete	Nationality	1	2	3	4	5	6	Best	Notes
1st place, gold medalist(s)	Liu Li	China	11.66	11.80	12.02	9.87	12.97	12.79	12.97	WR
2nd place, silver medalist(s)	Aleksei Churkin	RPC	10.62	11.31	9.86	10.71	10.32	9.70	11.31	AR
3rd place, bronze medalist(s)	Mohammed Al Mashaykhi	Oman	10.84	8.73	9.60	9.41	10.19	10.00	10.84	PB
4	Lahouari Bahlaz	Algeria	x	10.37	x	x	x	x	10.37	SB
5	Mohamed Nadjib Amchi	Algeria	8.95	9.36	8.58	8.85	9.26	9.62	9.62	
6	Athanasios Konstantinidis	Greece	x	x	x	9.44	x	9.58	9.58	
7	Ahmed Mehideb	Algeria	8.78	9.51	8.96	x	8.11	x	9.51	SB
8	Abdennacer Feidi	Tunisia	8.75	8.82	x	x	8.15	x	8.82	SB
9	Maciej Sochal	Poland	x	x	7.71	x	8.51	7.98	8.51	

=== F33 ===
Records

Prior to this competition, the existing world, Paralympic, and area records were as follows:

World record	Evgenii Torsunov (RUS)	12.36	Doha, Qatar	25 October 2015
Paralympic record	Daniel Scheil (GER)	11.03	Rio de Janeiro, Brazil	10 September 2016

Area	Distance (m)	Athlete	Nation
Africa	11.40	Zakariae Derhem	Morocco
America	8.50	Gertrudis Ortega Campos	Panama
Asia	11.09	Mohamadreza Ahmadi	Iran
Europe	12.36 WR	Evgenii Torsunov	Russia
Oceania	9.84	Jessee Wyatt	Australia

Results

The final in this classification took place on 4 September 2021, at 19:05:

Rank	Athlete	Nationality	1	2	3	4	5	6	Best	Notes
1st place, gold medalist(s)	Zakariae Derhem	Morocco	x	11.37	10.92	x	x	11.25	11.37	GR
2nd place, silver medalist(s)	Kamel Kardjena	Algeria	10.45	10.70	x	11.34	x	x	11.34	SB
3rd place, bronze medalist(s)	Deni Černi	Croatia	10.58	11.01	11.25	x	x	10.54	11.25	SB
4	Aleksandr Khrupin	RPC	10.62	11.04	10.88	11.21	10.86	x	11.21	
5	Daniel Scheil	Germany	x	x	9.67	9.86	x	9.63	9.86	
6	Michał Głąb	Poland	x	x	x	8.88	8.84	x	8.88	
7	Lazaros Stefanidis	Greece	8.20	x	7.99	8.03	x	x	8.20	

=== F34 ===
Records

Prior to this competition, the existing world, Paralympic, and area records were as follows:

World record	Ahmad Hindi (JOR)	12.17	Dubai, United Arab Emirates	10 November 2019
Paralympic record	Azeddine Nouiri (MAR)	11.28	Rio de Janeiro, Brazil	11 September 2016

Area	Distance (m)	Athlete	Nation
Africa	11.28 PR	Azeddine Nouiri	Morocco
America	11.35	Mauricio Valencia	Colombia
Asia	12.17 WR	Ahmad Hindi	Jordan
Europe	11.11	Tomasz Pauliński	Poland
Oceania	6.93	Tim Ryan	Australia

Results

The final in this classification took place on 4 September 2021, at 9:35:

Rank	Athlete	Nationality	1	2	3	4	5	6	Best	Notes
1st place, gold medalist(s)	Ahmad Hindi	Jordan	12.25	12.20	12.05	x	x	11.66	12.25	WR
2nd place, silver medalist(s)	Azeddine Nouiri	Morocco	11.55	11.04	10.85	10.95	10.98	11.46	11.55	AR
3rd place, bronze medalist(s)	Abdulrahman Abdulqadir Fiqi	Qatar	11.15	x	11.36	10.98	10.32	9.79	11.36	SB
4	Tomasz Pauliński	Poland	11.09	10.41	x	10.26	10.88	11.07	11.09	SB
5	Mauricio Valencia	Colombia	10.86	10.69	x	10.78	11.03	10.99	11.03	
6	Siamak Saleh Farajzadeh	Iran	10.76	10.80	10.72	10.65	10.74	x	10.80	SB
7	Wang Yanzhang	China	10.31	10.57	10.13	10.70	10.54	10.36	10.70	PB
8	Thierry Cibone	France	10.02	10.34	9.62	9.85	9.78	9.88	10.34	
9	Oleksandr Aliekseienko	Israel	9.43	9.65	9.66	9.37	9.29	9.14	9.66	SB
10	Arystanbek Bazarkulov	Kyrgyzstan	7.92	7.34	7.71	8.10	8.06	8.03	8.10	SB

=== F35 ===
Records

Prior to this competition, the existing world, Paralympic, and area records were as follows:

World record	Khusniddin Norbekov (UZB)	17.32	Dubai, United Arab Emirates	11 November 2019
Paralympic record	Guo Wei (CHN)	16.22	Beijing, China	14 September 2008

Area	Distance (m)	Athlete	Nation
Africa	11.40	Youssouf Bensedira	Algeria
America	15.87	Hernán Emanuel Urra	Argentina
Asia	17.32 WR	Khusniddin Norbekov	Uzbekistan
Europe	14.55	Edgars Bergs	Latvia
Oceania	10.65	Daniel Jennings	Australia

Results

The final in this classification took place on 2 September 2021, at 19:58:

Rank	Athlete	Nationality	1	2	3	4	5	6	Best	Notes
1st place, gold medalist(s)	Khusniddin Norbekov	Uzbekistan	14.10	x	15.67	14.56	15.80	16.13	16.13	SB
2nd place, silver medalist(s)	Hernán Emanuel Urra	Argentina	15.12	15.53	x	14.67	15.43	15.90	15.90	AR
3rd place, bronze medalist(s)	Fu Xinhan	China	15.41	14.81	x	14.92	15.06	14.53	15.41	SB
4	Seyed Aliasghar Javanmardi	Iran	15.22	15.40	14.97	14.50	15.19	x	15.40	
5	Edgars Bergs	Latvia	14.28	14.70	14.08	14.20	14.06	14.41	14.70	AR
6	Alexander Elmin	RPC	12.92	13.68	13.69	x	x	13.78	13.78	
7	Arvind Arvind	India	10.52	12.41	x	11.87	x	13.48	13.48	
8	Nicky Russo	Italy	12.56	11.25	12.36	12.58	11.91	12.57	12.58	

=== F36 ===
Records

Prior to this competition, the existing world, Paralympic, and area records were as follows:

World record	Vladimir Sviridov (RUS)	16.32	Dubai, United Arab Emirates	13 November 2019
Paralympic record	Sebastian Dietz (GER)	14.84	Rio de Janeiro, Brazil	16 September 2016

Area	Distance (m)	Athlete	Nation
Africa	14.74	Yassine Guenichi	Tunisia
America	14.68	Jose Roman Ruiz Castro	Mexico
Asia	14.93	Li Cuiqing	China
Europe	16.32 WR	Vladimir Sviridov	Russia
Oceania	11.24	Nicholas Larionow	Australia

Results

The final in this classification took place on 31 August 2021, at 10:53:

Rank	Athlete	Nationality	1	2	3	4	5	6	Best	Notes
1st place, gold medalist(s)	Vladimir Sviridov	RPC	14.82	15.60	15.46	16.45	x	16.67	16.67	WR
2nd place, silver medalist(s)	Yassine Guenichi	Tunisia	14.03	14.12	x	15.12	14.66	14.58	15.12	AR
3rd place, bronze medalist(s)	Sebastian Dietz	Germany	x	14.53	14.81	14.71	14.58	x	14.81	
4	José Roman Ruiz Castro	Mexico	14.42	14.28	13.15	x	12.86	13.36	14.42	
5	Alan Kokoity	RPC	14.37	x	x	13.73	x	13.50	14.37	
6	Dastan Mukashbekov	Kazakhstan	12.74	12.97	12.85	13.24	12.67	12.65	13.24	

=== F37 ===
Records

Prior to this competition, the existing world, Paralympic, and area records were as follows:

World record	Xia Dong (CHN)	17.52	London, United Kingdom	5 September 2012
Paralympic record	Xia Dong (CHN)	17.52	London, United Kingdom	5 September 2012

Area	Distance (m)	Athlete	Nation
Africa	14.40	Ahmed Ben Moslah	Tunisia
America	14.09	João Victor Teixeira de Souza Silva	Brazil
Asia	17.52 WR	Xia Dong	China
Europe	16.80	Mindaugas Bilius	Lithuania
Oceania	12.08	Ben Tuimaseve	New Zealand

Results

The final in this classification took place on 27 August 2021, at 19:53:

Rank	Athlete	Nationality	1	2	3	4	5	6	Best	Notes
1st place, gold medalist(s)	Albert Khinchagov	RPC	15.78	15.69	15.76	x	15.77	x	15.78	PB
2nd place, silver medalist(s)	Ahmed Ben Moslah	Tunisia	14.09	14.14	14.50	14.14	14.26	14.35	14.50	AR
3rd place, bronze medalist(s)	João Victor Teixeira de Souza Silva	Brazil	13.42	13.79	x	13.28	14.45	13.48	14.45	AR
4	Mykola Zhabnyak	Ukraine	13.77	14.18	13.66	14.08	x	13.39	14.18	
5	Bryan Leonel Enriquez Gonzalez	Mexico	12.49	11.69	13.94	13.72	13.33	13.68	13.94	PB
6	Donatas Dundzys	Lithuania	13.77	x	12.05	13.86	13.47	13.55	13.86	PB
7	Emanoel Victor Souza de Oliveira	Brazil	13.63	13.15	x	12.94	x	13.51	13.63	
8	Tomasz Ściubak	Poland	12.80	13.38	12.67	12.70	12.64	12.88	13.38	SB
9	Ben Tuimaseve	New Zealand	12.86	13.31	13.21	Did not advance			13.31	AR

=== F40 ===
Records

Prior to this competition, the existing world, Paralympic, and area records were as follows:

World record	Miguel Monteiro (POR)	11.01	Braga, Portugal	21 February 2021
Paralympic record	Garrah Tnaiash (IRQ)	10.76	Rio de Janeiro, Brazil	16 September 2016

Area	Distance (m)	Athlete	Nation
Africa	9.44	Smaali Bouaabid	Tunisia
Americas	8.24	Jair Porfírio	Brazil
Asia	10.88	Garrah Tnaiash	Iraq
Europe	11.01 WR	Miguel Monteiro	Portugal
Oceania	Vacant		

Results

The final in this classification took place on 29 August 2021, at 10:53:

Rank	Athlete	Nationality	1	2	3	4	5	6	Best	Notes
1st place, gold medalist(s)	Denis Gnezdilov	RPC	11.02	9.84	10.94	10.52	10.99	11.16	11.16	WR
2nd place, silver medalist(s)	Garrah Tnaiash	Iraq	10.79	10.88	10.67	10.74	x	11.15	11.15	AR
3rd place, bronze medalist(s)	Miguel Monteiro	Portugal	10.45	x	x	10.37	10.76	10.68	10.76	
4	Matija Sloup	Croatia	10.48	10.54	10.51	10.60	10.43	10.46	10.60	PB
5	Dmitry Dushkin	RPC	10.39	8.85	9.70	10.18	9.99	10.00	10.39	
6	Yannis Fischer	Germany	9.96	x	9.68	9.69	10.16	9.87	10.16	
7	Take Zonneveld	Netherlands	9.74	x	9.82	10.04	9.59	x	10.04	PB
8	Muhammad Diroy Noordin	Singapore	9.58	x	9.85	x	9.24	9.92	9.92	PB
9	Gyeltshen Gyeltshen	Bhutan	6.28	6.28	6.31	Did not advance			6.31	PB

=== F41 ===
Records

Prior to this competition, the existing world, Paralympic, and area records were as follows:

World record	Bobirjon Omonov (UZB)	14.31	Dubai, United Arab Emirates	10 February 2021
Paralympic record	Niko Kappel (GER)	13.57	Rio de Janeiro, Brazil	8 September 2016

Area	Distance (m)	Athlete	Nation
Africa	10.74	Mohamed Amara	Tunisia
America	13.62	Hagan Landry	United States
Asia	14.31 WR	Bobirjon Omonov	Uzbekistan
Europe	14.30	Niko Kappel	Germany
Oceania	10.65	Record Mark	

Results

The final in this classification took place on 30 August 2021, at 10:08:

Rank	Athlete	Nationality	1	2	3	4	5	6	Best	Notes
1st place, gold medalist(s)	Bobirjon Omonov	Uzbekistan	13.21	13.89	13.66	13.79	13.77	14.06	14.06	GR
2nd place, silver medalist(s)	Hagan Landry	United States	13.40	13.73	13.88	13.55	13.49	13.69	13.88	AR
3rd place, bronze medalist(s)	Niko Kappel	Germany	12.95	13.29	x	13.30	13.01	13.08	13.30	
4	Kyron Duke	Great Britain	x	12.04	x	11.97	x	12.29	12.29	
5	Bartosz Tyszkowski	Poland	12.28	x	x	x	x	x	12.28	
6	Sun Pengxiang	China	9.85	10.21	9.76	10.17	–	–	10.21	SB
7	Kah Michel Ye	Ivory Coast	8.90	9.55	10.01	10.15	9.73	x	10.15	PB
	Iosefo Rakesa	Fiji							DNS	

=== F46 ===
Records

Prior to this competition, the existing world, Paralympic, and area records were as follows:

World record	Josh Cinnamo (USA)	16.80	Dubai, United Arab Emirates	15 November 2019
Paralympic record	Nikita Prokhorov (RUS)	15.68	London, United Kingdom	6 September 2012

Area	Distance (m)	Athlete	Nation
Africa	14.29	Kerwin Noemdo	South Africa
America	16.80 WR	Josh Cinnamo	United States
Asia	15.80	Enlong Wei	China
Europe	15.69	Nikita Prokhorov	Russia
Oceania	11.40	Eric Mellor	Australia

Results

The final in this classification took place on 1 September 2021, at 10:33:

Rank	Athlete	Nationality	1	2	3	4	5	6	Best	Notes
1st place, gold medalist(s)	Greg Stewart	Canada	16.75	16.39	x	15.87	16.73	16.29	16.75	GR
2nd place, silver medalist(s)	Nikita Prokhorov	RPC	15.22	x	16.29	x	x	15.22	16.29	AR
3rd place, bronze medalist(s)	Joshua Cinnamo	United States	15.19	x	15.90	x	15.49	15.84	15.90	SB
4	Kerwin Noemdo	South Africa	15.48	x	x	15.65	x	x	15.65	AR
5	Mathias Schulze	Germany	14.65	15.60	x	15.13	13.45	x	15.60	PB
6	Wei Enlong	China	14.77	14.53	15.48	15.38	15.23	15.31	15.48	SB
7	Andrius Skuja	Lithuania	14.76	14.61	x	14.56	x	14.32	14.76	
8	Abrahan Jesus Ortega Abello	Venezuela	14.14	x	14.36	x	14.62	13.89	14.62	

=== F53 ===
Records

Prior to this competition, the existing world, Paralympic, and area records were as follows:

World record	André Rocha (BRA)	8.83	Berlin, Germany	30 June 2018
Paralympic record	Mauro Máximo de Jesús (MEX)	8.72	Beijing, China	16 September 2008

Area	Distance (m)	Athlete	Nation
Africa	6.45	Hamza Kais	Algeria
America	8.83 WR	André Rocha	Brazil
Asia	8.73	Alireza Mokhtari	Iran
Europe	8.75	Jean-Francois Maitre	France
Oceania	Vacant		

Results

The final in this classification took place on 29 August 2021, at 9:35:

Rank	Athlete	Nationality	1	2	3	4	5	6	Best	Notes
1st place, gold medalist(s)	Elvin Astanov	Azerbaijan	8.34	8.48	8.36	8.47	8.62	8.77	8.77	GR
2nd place, silver medalist(s)	Alireza Mokhtari	Iran	7.86	x	8.48	8.36	x	6.86	8.48	SB
3rd place, bronze medalist(s)	Aleš Kisý	Czech Republic	8.18	8.19	8.24	x	8.25	8.23	8.25	=PB
4	Bartosz Górczak	Poland	7.52	7.91	7.98	7.90	7.79	7.97	7.98	PB
5	Che Jon Fernandes	Greece	7.35	7.45	7.47	7.63	7.61			SB
6	Marijan Presecan	Croatia	7.35	7.23	7.53	7.26	7.49	7.32	7.53	
7	Scot Severn	United States	7.36	7.18	7.28	7.06	7.13	7.28	7.36	
8	Husam Azzam	Palestine	4.19	4.95	x	5.58	x	5.18	5.58	SB
	Erick Ortiz Monroy	Mexico	x	x	x	x	x	x	NM	

=== F55 ===
Records

Prior to this competition, the existing world, Paralympic, and area records were as follows:

World record	Wallace Santos (BRA)	12.63	Tokyo, Japan	27 August 2021
Paralympic record	Wallace Santos (BRA)	12.63	Tokyo, Japan	27 August 2021

Area	Distance (m)	Athlete	Nation
Africa	11.46	Mourad Bachir	Algeria
America	11.24	Wallace Santos	Brazil
Asia	11.63	Jalil Bagheri Jeddi	Iran
Europe	12.47 WR	Ruzhdi Ruzhdi	Bulgaria
Oceania	9.60	Terry Giddy	Australia

Results

The final in this classification took place on 27 August 2021, at 19:00:

Rank	Athlete	Nationality	Class	1	2	3	4	5	6	Best	Notes
1st place, gold medalist(s)	Wallace Santos	Brazil	F55	12.15	x	11.96	12.46	12.45	12.63	12.63	WR
2nd place, silver medalist(s)	Ruzhdi Ruzhdi	Bulgaria	F55	12.14	12.19	x	x	12.23	x	12.23	
3rd place, bronze medalist(s)	Lech Stoltman	Poland	F55	12.05	11.84	x	12.15	12.06	12.15	12.15	SB
4	Sergei Sokulskii	RPC	F54	11.61	x	11.29	12.06	11.67	x	12.06	WR
5	Olokhan Musayev	Azerbaijan	F55	11.43	11.65	11.89	x	11.70	11.73	11.89	PB
6	Nebojša Đurić	Serbia	F55	11.28	10.97	10.89	11.15	11.18	10.95	11.28	
7	Dževad Pandžić	Bosnia and Herzegovina	F55	9.80	10.70	10.43	10.94	10.53	11.03	11.03	SB
8	Tek Chand	India	F55	x	8.57	x	9.04	x	x	9.04	SB

=== F57 ===
Records

Prior to this competition, the existing world, Paralympic, and area records were as follows:

World record	Thiago Paulino dos Santos (BRA)	15.26	Lima, Peru	24 August 2019
Paralympic record	Wu Guoshan (CHN)	14.42	Rio de Janeiro, Brazil	17 September 2016

Area	Distance (m)	Athlete	Nation
Africa	12.03	Emeka Kiyem	Nigeria
America	15.26 WR	Thiago Paulino dos Santos	Brazil
Asia	14.53	Wu Guoshan	China
Europe	14.92	Janusz Rokicki	Poland
Oceania	8.78	Record Mark	

Results

The final in this classification took place on 3 September 2021, at 19:10:

Rank	Athlete	Nationality	1	2	3	4	5	6	Best	Notes
1st place, gold medalist(s)	Wu Guoshan	China	14.26	14.65	14.80	15.00	x	x	15.00	GR
2nd place, silver medalist(s)	Marco Aurélio Borges	Brazil	13.98	x	14.85	x	12.65	x	14.85	PB
3rd place, bronze medalist(s)	Thiago Paulino dos Santos	Brazil	14.77	x	x	x	x	r	14.77	SB
4	Soman Rana	India	13.81	12.92	x	x	13.36	13.37	13.81	
5	Mohamad Mohamad	Syria	13.59	x	x	x	13.18	x	13.59	SB
6	Janusz Rokicki	Poland	13.46	x	13.53	13.48	13.07	13.39	13.53	
7	Samir Nabiyev	Azerbaijan	12.89	13.12	x	x	x	12.70	13.12	SB
8	Pablo Damian Gimenez Reinoso	Argentina	x	12.17	12.01	x	11.22	11.98	12.17	
9	Yorkinbek Odilov	Uzbekistan	11.06	x	x	10.63	11.71	x	11.71	PB
10	Mahmoud Rajab	Libya	10.88	10.84	11.03	11.20	11.47	11.19	11.47	SB
11	Edgar Ismael Barajas Barajas	Mexico	10.47	11.33	11.21	10.70	x	10.84	11.33	
12	Paulin Mayombo Mukendi	Democratic Republic of the Congo	9.23	x	8.87	9.66	x	8.91	9.66	PB
13	Ywenson Registre	Haiti	6.98	7.13	7.11	6.96	7.04	7.02	7.13	PB
14	Naseb Fateh Mohammed Alraouad	Yemen	x	6.69	6.88	6.27	x	5.71	6.88	PB
15	Mahdi Abshir Omar	Somalia	x	x	x	x	5.67	5.97	5.97	PB

=== F63 ===
Records

Prior to this competition, the existing world, Paralympic, and area records were as follows:

World record	Tom Habscheid (LUX)	15.10	Dubai, United Arab Emirates	10 November 2019
Paralympic record	Vacant	–		

Area	Distance (m)	Athlete	Nation
Africa	13.36	Tyrone Pillay	South Africa
America	10.96	Carlos Felipa	Peru
Asia	13.79	Baolong Pang	China
Europe	15.10 WR	Tom Habscheid	Luxembourg
Oceania	11.17	Joe Flavell	New Zealand

Results

The final in this classification took place on 4 September 2021, at 19:44:

Rank	Athlete	Nationality	Class	1	2	3	4	5	6	Best	Notes
1st place, gold medalist(s)	Aled Davies	Great Britain	F42	14.13	15.05	15.25	15.33	x	x	15.33	
2nd place, silver medalist(s)	Sajad Mohammadian	Iran	F42	14.88	x	14.12	14.05	x	x	14.88	SB
3rd place, bronze medalist(s)	Faisal Sorour	Kuwait	F42	14.13	x	13.79	13.43	12.92	13.60	14.13	PB
4	Tom Habscheid	Luxembourg	F63	13.64	13.92	13.26	13.50	13.80	13.50	13.92	
5	Palitha Halgahawela	Sri Lanka	F42	12.67	13.08	13.30	13.40	13.30	12.26	13.40	
6	Mukhammad Rikhsimov	Uzbekistan	F42	12.54	12.46	12.69	13.14	13.26	12.74	13.26	
7	Edenilson Roberto Floriani	Brazil	F42	x	12.82	11.71	12.37	x	11.36	12.82	
8	Tyrone Pillay	South Africa	F63	11.23	x	x	11.33	11.87	11.94	11.94	
9	Akmal Qodirov	Tajikistan	F63	8.10	x	8.44	Did not advance			8.44	
