= Guatemala at the 2024 Summer Paralympics =

- IPC code: GUA
- NPC: Comité Paralímpico Guatemalteco

in Paris, France August 28, 2024 – September 8, 2024
- Competitors: 2 in 2 sports
- Flag bearers: Juan Diego Blas Fernandez; Ericka Violeta Esteban Villatoro
- Medals: Gold 0 Silver 0 Bronze 0 Total 0

Summer Paralympics appearances (overview)
- 1976; 1980; 1984; 1988; 1992–2000; 2004; 2008; 2012; 2016; 2020; 2024

Guatemala competed at the 2024 Summer Paralympics in Paris, France, from 28 August to 8 September.

== Competitors ==
The following is the list of number of competitors in the Games.

Sport	Men	Women	Total
Archery	1	0	1
Athletics	0	1	1
Total	1	1	2

== Archery ==
Guatemala has one quota for the game earned by Bipartite Commission.

Athlete	Event	Ranking Round		Round of 32	Round of 16	Quarterfinals	Semifinals	Finals	
Athlete	Event	Score	Seed	Opposition Score	Opposition Score	Opposition Score	Opposition Score	Opposition Score	Rank
Juan Blas	Men's individual recurve	606	17	Ramírez (COL); L 4–6	Did not advance				=17

== Athletics ==
Women

Athlete	Event	Heat		Final	
Athlete	Event	Result	Rank	Result	Rank
Ericka Violeta Esteban Villatoro	Women's 400 m T38	1:11.79 PB	7	Did not advance	

== See also ==
- Guatemala at the 2024 Summer Olympics
- Guatemala at the Paralympics
