= Guatemala at the 1976 Summer Paralympics =

- IPC code: GUA
- NPC: Comité Paralimpico Guatemalteco

in Toronto
- Medals Ranked 33rd: Gold 0 Silver 0 Bronze 1 Total 1

Summer Paralympics appearances (overview)
- 1976; 1980; 1984; 1988; 1992–2000; 2004; 2008; 2012; 2016; 2020; 2024

Guatemala sent a delegation to compete at the 1976 Summer Paralympics in Toronto, Ontario, Canada. Its athletes finished thirty-third in the overall medal count.

== See also ==
- 1976 Summer Paralympics
- Guatemala at the 1976 Summer Olympics
