= Guatemala at the 1984 Summer Paralympics =

- IPC code: GUA
- NPC: Comité Paralimpico Guatemalteco

in Stoke Mandeville/New York
- Competitors: 4
- Medals: Gold 0 Silver 0 Bronze 0 Total 0

Summer Paralympics appearances (overview)
- 1976; 1980; 1984; 1988; 1992–2000; 2004; 2008; 2012; 2016; 2020; 2024

Guatemala competed at the 1984 Summer Paralympics in Stoke Mandeville, Great Britain, and New York City, United States. Four competitors from Guatemala won no medals; as such, they did not place in the medal table.

== See also ==
- Guatemala at the Paralympics
- Guatemala at the 1984 Summer Olympics
