= Guatemala at the 2008 Summer Paralympics =

- IPC code: GUA
- NPC: Comité Paralimpico Guatemalteco

in Beijing
- Competitors: 1 in 1 sport
- Medals: Gold 0 Silver 0 Bronze 0 Total 0

Summer Paralympics appearances (overview)
- 1976; 1980; 1984; 1988; 1992–2000; 2004; 2008; 2012; 2016; 2020; 2024

Guatemala sent a delegation to compete at the 2008 Summer Paralympics in Beijing, People's Republic of China. The delegation consisted of a single competitor, runner Cesar Lopez.

== Athletics ==
| Athlete | Event | Heat | | Final | |
| Athlete | Event | Time | Rank | Time | Rank |
|---|---|---|---|---|---|
| Cesar Lopez | Men's 5000 metres T13 | 17:05.32 | 6 | Did not advance | |

== See also ==
- Guatemala at the Paralympics
- Guatemala at the 2008 Summer Olympics
