= Guatemala at the 2016 Summer Paralympics =

- IPC code: GUA
- NPC: Comité Paralimpico Guatemalteco

in Rio de Janeiro
- Competitors: 1 in 1 sports
- Flag bearer: Óscar Raxón Siquiej
- Medals: Gold 0 Silver 0 Bronze 0 Total 0

Summer Paralympics appearances (overview)
- 1976; 1980; 1984; 1988; 1992–2000; 2004; 2008; 2012; 2016; 2020; 2024

Guatemala sent a delegation to compete at the 2016 Summer Paralympics in Rio de Janeiro, Brazil, from 7–18 September 2016. This was the nation's seventh time competing in the Summer Paralympic Games since it made its debut forty years prior in Toronto, Canada. Middle-distance runner Óscar Raxón Siquiej was the only athlete that Guatemala sent to Rio de Janeiro after he was awarded a wild card spot by the International Paralympic Committee. He was third and last in his heat in the men's 1500 metres T11 and failed to advance to the final since only the top six were allowed in that stage of the competition.

== Background ==
Guatemala debuted in the Paralympic movement at the 1976 Summer Paralympics in Toronto, Canada. They have sent a delegation to most Summer Paralympic Games since, missing only the 1980, 1992, 1996 and the 2000 editions. The Games in Rio de Janeiro were the nation's seventh appearance at a Summer Paralympiad. Guatemala have won two Paralympic medals in the sport of weightlifting. The 2016 Summer Paralympics were held from 7–18 September 2016 with a total of 4,328 athletes representing 159 National Paralympic Committees taking part. Middle-distance runner Óscar Raxón Siquiej was the only athlete to represent Guatemala at the Rio de Janeiro Summer Paralympic Games, and was selected to be the flag bearer for the parade of nations during the opening ceremony. He was accompanied by the chef de mission of the team Noé Hinestroza, Siquiej's coach Luis Álvarez, doctor Erika Pérez and Paralympic attaché Rodolfo Quezada.

== Disability classifications ==
Every participant at the Paralympics has their disability grouped into one of five disability categories; amputation, the condition may be congenital or sustained through injury or illness; cerebral palsy; wheelchair athletes, there is often overlap between this and other categories; visual impairment, including blindness; Les autres, any physical disability that does not fall strictly under one of the other categories, for example dwarfism or multiple sclerosis. Each Paralympic sport then has its own classifications, dependent upon the specific physical demands of competition. Events are given a code, made of numbers and letters, describing the type of event and classification of the athletes competing. Some sports, such as athletics, divide athletes by both the category and severity of their disabilities, other sports, for example swimming, group competitors from different categories together, the only separation being based on the severity of the disability.

== Athletics ==
Óscar Raxón Siquiej was 35 years old at the time of the Rio Summer Paralympics and he was making his debut in the Paralympic Games. His disability is congenital; he was born with a total visual impairment and is classified as T11 and his guide is Santos Martínez López. Siquej was awarded a wild card spot by the International Paralympic Committee in July 2016 to qualify for the Paralympics because his best personal best time of four minutes and 55 seconds, set at a 2015 qualifying meet in El Salvador, was 23 seconds slower than the "B" qualifying standard for the men's 1500 metres T11. He trained at the Estadio Doroteo Guamuch Flores track in Guatemala City to prepare for the Games. In an interview before the Paralympics, Siquiej said, "I ask the Guatemalans to trust me. We have put our best effort into each training and we believe we can achieve something great." On 11 September, the heats of the men's 1500 metres T11 were held at the Maracanã Stadium, where the top six athletes would proceed to the final two days later. Assigned to the first heat, Siquiej finished third and last out of all the finishing athletes, in a time of four minutes and 57.22 seconds, eliminating him from the competition since he was twelfth overall. (Note: Five athletes were disqualified in the heats.) He dedicated his performance to his mother, who died of ill health three days before the heats.

Men's Track

Athlete	Events	Heat		Final	
Athlete	Events	Time	Rank	Time	Rank
Óscar Raxón Siquiej (Guide – Santos Martínez López)	1500 m T11	4:57.22	3	did not advance	

== See also ==
- Guatemala at the 2016 Summer Olympics
