= Josh Cinnamo =

American Paralympic athlete (born 1981)

Personal information
- Full name: Joshua Cinnamo
- Born: February 18, 1981 (age 45) San Diego, California, U.S.

Sport
- Sport: Para-athletics
- Disability class: F46
- Event: Shot put
- Club: Velaasa Track Club
- Coached by: Dr. Larry Judge
Medal record
Men's para-athletics
Representing the United States
Paralympic Games
Bronze medal – third place	2020 Tokyo	Shot put F46
World Championships
Silver medal – second place	2025 New Delhi	Shot put F46
Silver medal – second place	2023 Paris	Shot put F46
Gold medal – first place	2019 Dubai	Shot put F46
Parapan American Games
Gold medal – first place	2019 Lima	Shot put F46
Gold medal – first place	2023 Santiago	Shot put F46
US Paralympic Trials
Gold medal – first place	2024 Miramar	Shot put F46
Gold medal – first place	2021 Minneapolis	Shot put F46
WPA Grand Prix
Gold medal – first place	2022 Paris Grand Prix	Shot put F46
Gold medal – first place	2022 Desert Challenge Grand Prix	Shot put F46
Gold medal – first place	2019 Italy Grand Prix	Shot put F46
Gold medal – first place	2019 Desert Challenge Grand Prix	Shot put F46
Gold medal – first place	2018 Berlin Grand Prix	Shot put F46

Joshua Cinnamo (born February 18, 1981), is an American Paralympic athlete. Cinnamo competes in the F46 classification, as described by the International Paralympic Committee and World Para Athletics.

== Career ==
Cinnamo attended Luther College in Iowa, where he competed on the football and track and field teams.

Cinnamo made his international championship debut at the 2017 World Para Athletics Championships in London, where he finished fourth in the men's F46 shot put.

At the 2019 Parapan American Games in Lima, Peru, Cinnamo won the gold medal and set a world record of 16.49 m in the men's F46 shot put, surpassing the previous mark of 15.98 m. It was the first of two world records he set that year.

Later in 2019, Cinnamo won the gold medal at the 2019 World Para Athletics Championships in Dubai, throwing a world record 16.80 m in the men's F46 shot put final. It was his first World Championship medal.

In 2021, Cinnamo competed at the delayed 2020 Summer Paralympics in Tokyo, winning the bronze medal in the men's F46 shot put. This marked his Paralympic debut. Results can be found at Athletics at the 2020 Summer Paralympics – Men's shot put.

At the 2023 World Para Athletics Championships in Paris, Cinnamo won the silver medal in the men's F46 shot put with a throw of 16.00 m, earning his second career World Championship medal.

In 2024, Cinnamo competed at the World Para Athletics Championships in Kobe, Japan, placing fifth in the men's F46 shot put. He later finished fourth at the 2024 Summer Paralympics in Paris in the same event.

At the 2025 World Para Athletics Championships in New Delhi, Cinnamo won the silver medal in the men's F46 shot put, adding his third career World Championship medal.
