= Albert Khinchagov =

Russian para-athlete (born 1996)

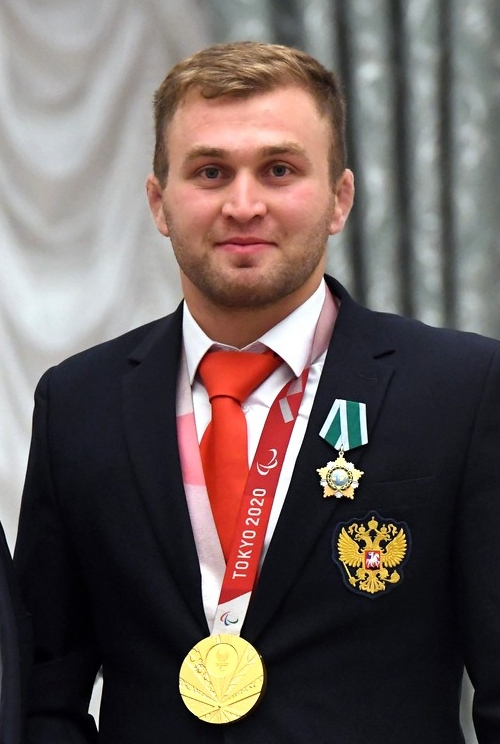
- Khinchagov in 2021

Personal information
- Full name: Albert Omarovich Khinchagov
- Nationality: Russian
- Born: 18 October 1996 (age 29) Vladikavkaz, Russia
- Education: North Ossetian State University

Sport
- Country: Russia
- Sport: Paralympic athletics
- Disability class: F37
- Event: Shot put
- Club: Stimul Sports School of Olympic Reserve
- Coached by: Boris Koroev; Valery Gagloev
Medal record
Para-athletics
Representing RPC
Paralympic Games
Gold medal – first place	2020 Tokyo	Shot put F37
Representing Neutral Paralympic Athletes (NPA)
World Championships
Gold medal – first place	2025 New Delhi	Shot put F37
Silver medal – second place	2024 Kobe	Shot put F37
Representing Russia
World Championships
Gold medal – first place	2019 Dubai	Shot put F37
European Championships
Gold medal – first place	2021 Bydgoszcz	Shot put F37

Albert Omarovich Khinchagov (Russian: Альберт Омарович Хинчагов; born 18 October 1996) is a Russian para-athlete, who won the gold medal in the shot put F37 event at the 2020 Summer Paralympics.
