= Miljenko Vučić =

Croatian Paralympic athlete

Personal information
- Born: 6 October 1981 (age 44) Ogulin, Yugoslavia
- Height: 1.88 m (6 ft 2 in)

Sport
- Country: Croatia
- Sport: Paralympic athletics
- Disability: Retinitis pigmentosa
- Disability class: F11
- Event: Shot put
Medal record
Paralympic athletics
Representing Croatia
World Championships
Silver medal – second place	2019 Dubai	Shot put F11
European Championships
Gold medal – first place	2021 Bydgoszcz	Shot put F11
Silver medal – second place	2016 Grosseto	Shot put F12
Bronze medal – third place	2018 Berlin	Shot put F12

Miljenko Vučić (born 6 October 1981) is a Croatian Paralympic athlete who competes in international track and field competitions, he is a shot putter and former discus thrower. He is a World silver medalist and European champion in shot put. He has competed at the 2016 and 2020 Summer Paralympics, Vučić narrowly missed a medal in shot put event at the 2020 Summer Paralympics.
