= Hagan Landry =

American Paralympic athlete

Personal information
- Nationality: American
- Born: July 14, 1994 (age 32) New Orleans, Louisiana
- Height: 4’10

Sport
- Sport: Para-athletics
- Disability class: F41
- Events: shot put javelin throw
- Coached by: Lawrence Judge, John Dagata
- Coaching career

Coaching career (HC unless noted)
- 2024–2025: West Virginia State (assistant)
- 2026–present: Grambling State (assistant)
Medal record
Men's para-athletics
Representing the United States
Paralympic Games
Silver medal – second place	2020 Tokyo	Shot put F41
World Championships
Bronze medal – third place	2023 Paris	Shot put F41
Parapan American Games
Gold medal – first place	2019 Lima	Shot put F41

Hagan Landry (born July 14, 1994) is an American Paralympic athlete and coach specializing in throwing events. He represented the United States at the 2020 Summer Paralympics.

== Athletic Career ==
Landry attended Delcambre High School in Delcambre, Louisana where he competed in track and field events shotput, discus, javelin, and the 100 meter dash.

Landry represented the United States in the men's shot put F41 event at the 2020 Summer Paralympics and won a silver medal. At the 2023 World Championships in Paris, Landry won a bronze medal.

== Coaching ==
Landry was an assistant coach of the throws for the women's track and field team at West Virginia State University for the 2025 season. In early 2026 he was announced as the throws coach for Grambling State University.
