= José Rolando =

Guatemalan paralympic weightlifter

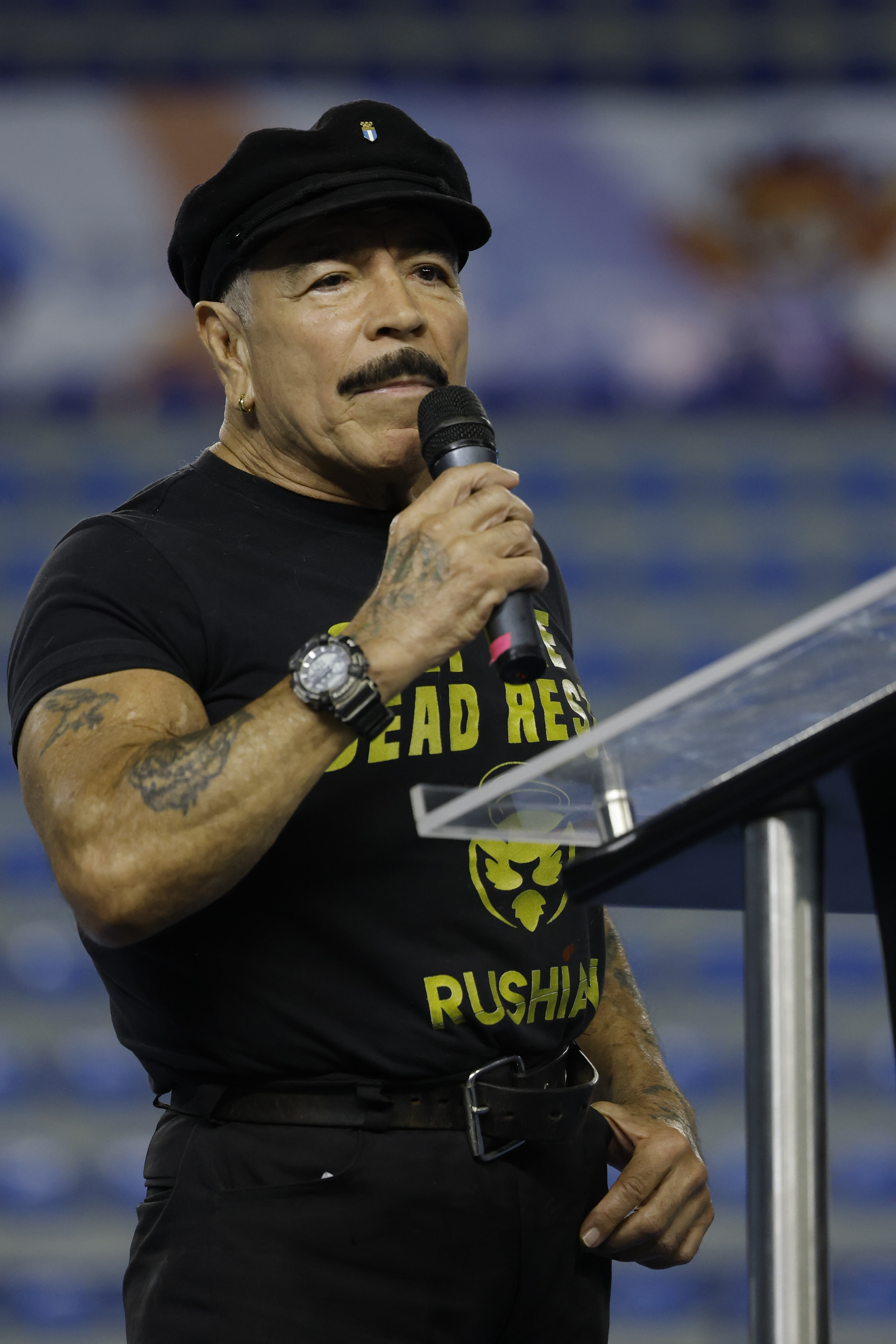

Personal information
- Born: José Rolando de León; 1950 (age 75–76)

Sport
- Country: Guatemala
- Sport: Weightlifting
- Disability: Polio
Medal record
Representing Guatemala
Paralympic Games
Weightlifting
Bronze medal – third place	1976 Toronto	Men's featherweight
Gold medal – first place	1988 Seoul	Men's -57 kg

José Rolando de León (born 1950) is a Guatemalan paralympic weightlifter. At the age of 10 months he contracted polio. He competed at the 1976 Summer Paralympics and 1988 Summer Paralympics, winning the gold and bronze medals in weightlifting.
