= Isaac Leiva =

Guatemalan Paralympic Athlete

Personal information
- Nationality: Guatemalan

Sport
- Sport: Track and Field
- Event(s): shot put, discus throw

Isaac Leiva is a Guatemalan Paralympic Athlete. He competed at the 2012 Summer Paralympics and the 2020 Summer Paralympics.

== International competitions ==
Year	Competition	Venue	Position	Event	Distance
2012	2012 Summer Paralympics	London, United Kingdom	15	Shot put F11–12	9.83
2012	2012 Summer Paralympics	London, United Kingdom	NM	Discus throw F11	NM
2020	2020 Summer Paralympics	Tokyo, Japan	11	Shot put F11	8.41
