= Levin Moreno =

Colombian para athlete (born 1989)

Personal information
- Full name: Levin Moreno Denis
- Nationality: Colombian
- Born: 17 April 1989 (age 37)

Sport
- Country: Colombia
- Sport: Para-athletics
- Disability class: F38
- Events: Shot put; Discus throw
Medal record
Representing Colombia
Men's para-athletics
World Championships
Gold medal – first place	2025 New Delhi	Shot put F38
Men's athletics
South American Games
Bronze medal – third place	2018 Cochabamba	Shot put

Levin Moreno Denis (born 17 April 1989) is a Colombian para athlete specializing in shot put.

== Career ==
Moreno competed at the 2025 World Para Athletics Championships and won a gold medal in the shot put F46 event with a world record throw of 20.38 meters. He also competed in the javelin throw F38 event and finished in fourth place with a personal best throw of 49.14 metres.
