= Denis Gnezdilov =

Russian Paralympic athlete

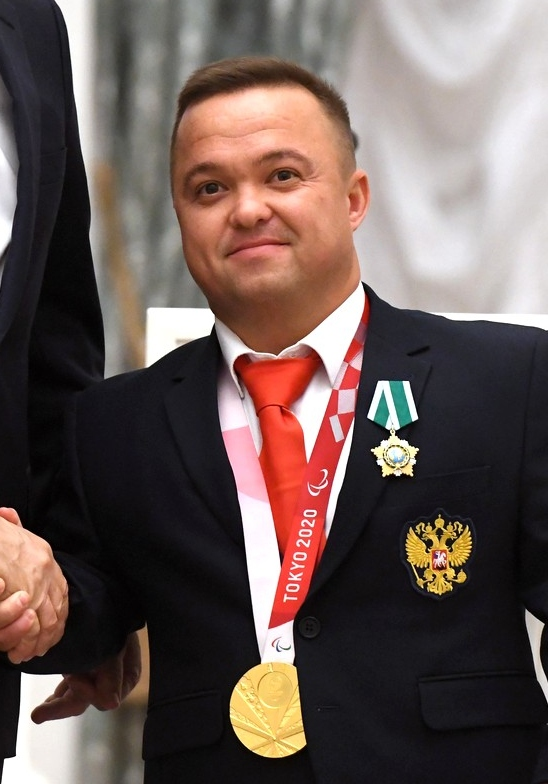
- Gnezdilov in 2021

Personal information
- Full name: Denis Anatolyevich Gnezdilov
- Nationality: Russian
- Born: 9 October 1986 (age 39) Rustavi, Georgia

Sport
- Sport: Paralympic athletics
- Disability class: F40
- Event: shot put
- Coached by: Nikolay Kolodko
Medal record
Representing RPC
Paralympic Games
Gold medal – first place	2020 Tokyo	Shot put F40
Representing Neutral Paralympic Athletes (NPA)
World Championships
Gold medal – first place	2024 Kobe	Shot put F40
Gold medal – first place	2025 New Delhi	Shot put F40

Denis Anatolyevich Gnezdilov (Russian: Денис Анатольевич Гнездилов; born 9 October 1986) is a Russian Paralympic athlete who specializes in the F40 shot put event.

== Career ==
Gnezdilov was born in Rustavi, Georgia, with a congenital dwarfism disorder. He then moved to Sochi, Russia, where he started training in the shot put in 2015. He debuted internationally in 2019, winning the F40 shot put event at the World Championships. Two years later he won a gold medal at the 2020 Paralympics, setting a world record.
