= 2017 World Para Athletics Championships – Men's javelin throw =

The men's javelin throw at the 2017 World Para Athletics Championships was held at the Olympic Stadium in London from 14 to 23 July.

== Medalists ==
Event	Gold		Silver		Bronze	
F13	Aleksandr Svechnikov; Uzbekistan	71.01 WR	Sajad Nikparast; Iran	61.88 SB	Hector Cabrera Llacer; Spain	61.53
F34	Mauricio Valencia; Colombia	35.21 SB	Mohsen Kaedi; Iran	34.88 SB	Wang Yanzhang; China	33.32
F37	Dmitrijs Silovs; Latvia	55.89 CB	El Sayed Abdelmoneim El Saber; Egypt	48.35 AR	Lukasz Czarnecki; Poland	47.72 PB
F38	Jayden Sawyer; Australia	52.96 WR	Reinhardt Hamman; South Africa	50.48 SB	Oleksandr Doroshenko; Ukraine	49.63 PB
F41	Sun Pengxiang; China	42.14 SB	Wildan Nukhailawi; Iraq	41.04 SB	Mathias Mester; Germany	40.54 AR
F44	Akeem Stewart; Trinidad and Tobago	57.61 WR	Helgi Sveinsson; Iceland	56.74 CR	Alister McQueen; Canada	55.72 AR
F46	Sundar Singh Gurjar; India	60.36 PB	D. P. Herath Mudiyanselage; Sri Lanka	57.93	Guo Chunliang; China	56.14 SB
F54	Manolis Stefanoudakis; Greece	29.51 CR	Hamed Amiri; Iran	27.81 AR	Aliaksandr Tryputs; Belarus	27.78
F55	Miloš Zarić; Serbia	30.83 SB	Jonas Licurgo Ferreira; Brazil	29.05	Yaser Abdelaziz El Sayed; Egypt	28.63
F57	Amanollah Papi; Iran	44.87 PB	Mohammad Khalvandi; Iran	42.18 SB	Abdollah Heidari Til; Iran	41.83 SB
WR world record | AR area record | CR championship record | GR games record | NR national record | OR Olympic record | PB personal best | SB season best | WL world leading (in a given season)

Events listed in pink were contested but no medals were awarded.

== See also ==
- List of IPC world records in athletics
