= 2018 World Para Athletics European Championships – Men's javelin throw =

The men's javelin throw at the 2018 World Para Athletics European Championships was held at the Friedrich-Ludwig-Jahn-Sportpark in Berlin from 20 to 26 August. Nine classification finals are held in all over this event.

== Medalists ==
Event	Gold		Silver		Bronze	
F13	Hector Cabrera Llacer (ESP)	61.31 CR (F12)	Marek Wietecki (POL)	59.71	Nemanja Dimitrijević (SRB)	57.53 CR (F13)
F34	Thierry Cibone (FRA)	25.20 CR	Mateusz Wojnicki (POL)	22.08	Oleksandr Aliekseienko (ISR)	21.88
F38	Dmitrijs Silovs (LAT)	51.54 ER	Oleksandr Doroshenko (UKR)	47.12	Lucasz Czarnecki (POL)	43.62
F41	Mathias Mester (GER)	37.57	Take Zonneveld (NED)	33.22	Vladimir Gaspar (CRO)	32.75
F46	Andrius Skuja (LTU)	45.04	Dzmitry Vaselevich (BLR)	44.67	Andreas Lehmann (GER)	43.27
F54	Aliaksandr Tryputs (BLR)	29.48 CR	Manolis Stefanoudakis (GRE)	28.10	Drazenko Mitrovic (SRB)	23.16
F55	Miloš Zarić (SRB)	31.60 CR	Ramunas Verbavicius (LTU)	28.13	Georgi Kiryakov (BUL)	28.03
F57	Marcelin Walico (FRA)	37.05	Julius Hutka (SVK)	31.01	Musa Davulcu (TUR)	28.96
F64	Tony Falelavaki (FRA)	54.76	Roman Novak (UKR)	52.29	Helgi Sveinsson (ISL)	51.51 CR (F63)
WR world record | AR area record | CR championship record | GR games record | NR national record | OR Olympic record | PB personal best | SB season best | WL world leading (in a given season)

== See also ==
- List of IPC world records in athletics

== See also ==
- List of IPC world records in athletics
