= Athletics at the 2016 Summer Paralympics – Men's javelin throw =

The men's javelin throw athletics events for the 2016 Summer Paralympics take place at the Rio Olympic Stadium from 9 September. A total of 6 events are contested for 6 different classifications.

== Competition format ==
The competition for each classification consisted of a single round. Each athlete threw three times, after which the eight best threw three more times (with the best distance of the six throws counted).

== Schedule ==
| F | Final |

| Event↓/Date → | Thu 8 | Fri 9 | Sat 10 | Sun 11 | Mon 12 | Tue 13 | Wed 14 | Thu 15 | Fri 16 | Sat 17 |
|---|---|---|---|---|---|---|---|---|---|---|
| F13 | | | | | | | F | | | |
| F34 | | | | | | | | F | | |
| F38 | | | | | | | | F | | |
| F41 | | | | F | | | | | | |
| F44 | | F | | | | | | | | |
| F46 | | | | | | F | | | | |

== Medal summary ==
| Classification | Gold | | Silver | | Bronze | |
|---|---|---|---|---|---|---|
| F13 | Aleksandr Svechnikov; Uzbekistan | 65.59 | Sajad Nikparast; Iran | 62.74 | Nemanja Dimitrijević; Serbia | 60.86 |
| F34 | Mauricio Valencia; Colombia | 36.65 | Wang Yanzhang; China | 34.15 | Mohsen Kaedi; Iran | 33.42 |
| F38 | Reinhardt Hamman; South Africa | 50.96 | Luis Fernando Lucumí Villegas; Colombia | 49.19 | Javad Hardani; Iran | 48.46 |
| F41 | Kovan Abdulraheem; Iraq | 42.85 | Wildan Nukhailawi; Iraq | 42.02 | Sun Pengxiang; China | 41.81 |
| F44 | Akeem Stewart; Trinidad and Tobago | 57.32 | Alister McQueen; Canada | 55.56 | Rory McSweeney; New Zealand | 54.99 |
| F46 | Devendra Jhajharia; India | 63.97 | Guo Chunliang; China | 59.93 | Dinesh Priyantha; Sri Lanka | 58.23 |
| F57 | Mohammad Khalvandi; Iran | 46.12 | Abdollah Heidari Til; Iran | 43.77 | Cao Ngọc Hùng; Vietnam | 43.27 |

== Results ==
=== F13 ===
The F13 event took place on 14 September.

| Rank | Athlete | category | 1 | 2 | 3 | 4 | 5 | 6 | Best | Notes |
|---|---|---|---|---|---|---|---|---|---|---|
| 1st place, gold medalist(s) | Aleksandr Svechnikov (UZB) | F13 | 61.08 | 65.69 | 60.84 | 58.66 | 57.55 | 59.09 | 65.69 | PR RR |
| 2nd place, silver medalist(s) | Sajad Nikparast (IRI) | F12 | 59.37 | 60.07 | 60.60 | x | 57.05 | 62.74 | 62.74 | SB |
| 3rd place, bronze medalist(s) | Nemanja Dimitrijević (SRB) | F13 | 56.08 | 54.99 | 60.86 | 52.23 | 53.74 | 57.94 | 60.86 | PB |
| 4 | Branimir Budetic (CRO) | F13 | 50.98 | 54.48 | 53.57 | 55.83 | 59.33 | 56.93 | 59.33 | |
| 5 | Hector Cabrera Llacer (ESP) | F12 | 58.47 | 48.19 | 51.21 | 57.38 | 56.20 | 57.53 | 58.47 | |
| 6 | Zhu Pengkai (CHN) | F12 | 53.51 | 56.81 | 59.09 | 55.64 | x | 57.96 | 57.96 | SB |
| 7 | Andrei Mukha (BLR) | F13 | x | 55.18 | 56.32 | x | 56.08 | 55.58 | 56.32 | PB |

=== F34 ===
The F34 event took place on 15 September.

| Rank | Athlete | category | 1 | 2 | 3 | 4 | 5 | 6 | Best | Notes |
|---|---|---|---|---|---|---|---|---|---|---|
| 1st place, gold medalist(s) | Mauricio Valencia (COL) | F34 | 32.32 | 35.32 | x | 35.56 | 36.65 | 34.53 | 36.65 | RR |
| 2nd place, silver medalist(s) | Wang Yanzhang (CHN) | F34 | 29.59 | x | 33.05 | 31.18 | 32.02 | 34.15 | 34.15 | SB |
| 3rd place, bronze medalist(s) | Mohsen Kaedi (IRI) | F34 | 33.42 | x | x | 32.35 | x | x | 33.42 | SB |
| 4 | Diego Meneses (COL) | F34 | x | 30.45 | 30.43 | 31.07 | 31.05 | 31.31 | 31.31 | PB |
| 5 | Faouzi Rzig (TUN) | F34 | 28.60 | 29.42 | x | 29.08 | 30.36 | 30.11 | 30.36 | |
| 6 | Abdullah Hayayei (UAE) | F34 | 27.83 | 26.84 | x | 23.97 | 26.66 | x | 27.83 | |
| 7 | Azeddine Nouiri (MAR) | F34 | x | 27.35 | 27.69 | 27.70 | - | - | 27.70 | |
| 8 | Abdulrahman Abdulqadir Abdulrahman (QAT) | F34 | x | 25.27 | 23.34 | 24.38 | 26.03 | 25.17 | 26.03 | |
| 9 | Arystanbek Bazarkulov (KGZ) | F34 | 12.54 | 13.84 | 13.18 | - | - | - | 13.84 | PB |

=== F38 ===
The F38 event took place on 15 September.

| Rank | Athlete | category | 1 | 2 | 3 | 4 | 5 | 6 | Best | Notes |
|---|---|---|---|---|---|---|---|---|---|---|
| 1st place, gold medalist(s) | Reinhardt Hamman (RSA) | F38 | 49.31 | 48.83 | 49.63 | 49.87 | 47.18 | 50.96 | 50.96 | RR |
| 2nd place, silver medalist(s) | Luis Fernando Lucumí Villegas (COL) | F38 | x | 47.71 | 49.19 | 44.93 | 46.72 | 42.18 | 49.19 | RR |
| 3rd place, bronze medalist(s) | Javad Hardani (IRI) | F38 | 44.90 | x | 47.81 | 46.60 | 43.74 | 48.46 | 48.46 | RR |
| 4 | An Dongquan (CHN) | F38 | x | x | 45.73 | 47.90 | 46.94 | 45.55 | 47.90 | PB |
| 5 | Jayden Sawyer (AUS) | F38 | 43.15 | 44.26 | 45.63 | 43.87 | 44.40 | 42.79 | 45.63 | |
| 6 | Oleksandr Doroshenko (UKR) | F38 | 41.94 | 41.07 | 41.58 | 44.11 | 42.23 | 44.81 | 44.81 | SB |
| 7 | Petr Vratil (CZE) | F38 | 42.92 | x | x | 42.10 | x | x | 42.92 | |
| 8 | Cody Jones (USA) | F38 | 40.53 | 37.87 | 39.23 | 39.62 | 39.21 | 39.96 | 40.53 | |
| 9 | Dusan Grezl (CZE) | F38 | 33.25 | 34.31 | 37.15 | - | - | - | 37.15 | SB |

=== F41 ===
The F41 event took place on 11 September. It was open to both F40 and F41 classification athletes.

| Rank | Athlete | category | 1 | 2 | 3 | 4 | 5 | 6 | Best | Notes |
|---|---|---|---|---|---|---|---|---|---|---|
| 1st place, gold medalist(s) | Kovan Abdulraheem (IRQ) | F41 | 41.68 | 40.69 | 42.85 | 42.85 | 39.96 | 42.28 | 42.85 | PB |
| 2nd place, silver medalist(s) | Wildan Nukhailawi (IRQ) | F41 | 40.27 | 38.56 | 38.17 | 39.85 | 42.08 | x | 42.08 | SB |
| 3rd place, bronze medalist(s) | Sun Pengxiang (CHN) | F41 | x | 40.59 | 41.81 | x | 39.96 | x | 41.81 | SB |
| 4 | Shen Tongqing (CHN) | F41 | 34.89 | 39.90 | 39.61 | 39.33 | 40.19 | x | 40.19 | PB |
| 5 | Mathias Mester (GER) | F41 | 39.03 | 38.29 | 39.91 | 38.88 | 39.99 | x | 39.99 | |
| 6 | Kyron Duke (GBR) | F41 | 36.04 | 36.75 | 38.26 | 38.52 | 39.30 | 36.60 | 39.30 | PB |
| 7 | Mohamed Amara (TUN) | F41 | 36.75 | 36.66 | 36.05 | 35.90 | 36.91 | 34.63 | 36.91 | |
| 8 | Bartosz Tyszkowski (POL) | F41 | 35.93 | 32.04 | 32.96 | 33.69 | x | 31.72 | 35.93 | |
| 9 | Ahmed Naas (IRQ) | F40 | x | 35.29 | x | - | - | - | 35.29 | WR |
| 10 | Benian Richard Duffi (CIV) | F40 | 29.65 | 29.23 | 30.31 | - | - | - | 30.31 | RR |
| 11 | Muhammad Diroy Bin Noordin (SIN) | F40 | x | x | 22.71 | - | - | - | 22.71 | |

=== F44 ===
The F44 event took place on 9 September. It was open to F42, F43 and F44 classification athletes.

| Rank | Athlete | category | 1 | 2 | 3 | 4 | 5 | 6 | Best | Notes |
|---|---|---|---|---|---|---|---|---|---|---|
| 1st place, gold medalist(s) | Akeem Stewart (TTO) | F43 | 57.23 | 56.64 | 56.84 | 53.94 | 55.77 | 57.32 | 57.32 | WR |
| 2nd place, silver medalist(s) | Alister McQueen (CAN) | F44 | 47.54 | x | 53.86 | x | 55.56 | 54.77 | 55.56 | RR |
| 3rd place, bronze medalist(s) | Rory McSweeney (NZL) | F44 | 52.18 | 54.02 | 49.65 | 54.99 | 51.16 | 52.99 | 54.99 | |
| 4 | Sandeep Sandeep (IND) | F44 | 54.30 | 51.18 | 54.18 | x | 52.66 | x | 54.30 | PB |
| 5 | Helgi Sveinsson (ISL) | F42 | 53.96 | 48.88 | 52.72 | 53.45 | 53.32 | 49.99 | 53.96 | PR |
| 6 | Narender Ranbir (IND) | F44 | 51.31 | 51.68 | 53.79 | x | 52.61 | 50.70 | 53.79 | PB |
| 7 | Edevaldo Silva (BRA) | F44 | 46.28 | 48.40 | 52.86 | 53.13 | 49.36 | 53.74 | 53.74 | PB |
| 8 | Gerdán Fonseca (CUB) | F44 | 52.44 | 53.23 | 49.64 | 52.90 | x | 50.24 | 53.23 | PB |
| 9 | Márcio Fernandes (CPV) | F44 | 50.46 | 51.37 | 51.67 | - | - | - | 51.67 | SB |
| 10 | Jonas Spudis (LTU) | F44 | 50.79 | 49.52 | 50.22 | - | - | - | 50.79 | |
| 11 | Runar Steinstad (NOR) | F42 | 50.78 | 49.36 | 48.96 | - | - | - | 50.78 | PB |
| 12 | Sampath Hetti Ara Hetti Arachchige (SRI) | F44 | x | 42.88 | 47.22 | - | - | - | 47.22 | |
| 13 | Jeff Skiba (USA) | F44 | 43.87 | 44.45 | 43.63 | - | - | - | 45.45 | SB |
| 14 | Waleed Ashteebah (LBA) | F42 | x | 29.60 | 30.45 | - | - | - | 30.45 | SB |
| 15 | Bardy Chris Bouesso (CGO) | F44 | '29.72 | 27.98 | 29.19 | - | - | - | 29.72 | SB |
| 16 | Mohammad Naiem Durani (AFG) | F44 | 25.88 | 26.51 | 24.62 | - | - | - | 26.51 | PB |

=== F46 ===
| Rank | Athlete | category | 1 | 2 | 3 | 4 | 5 | 6 | Best | Notes |
|---|---|---|---|---|---|---|---|---|---|---|
| 1st place, gold medalist(s) | Devendra Jhajharia (IND) | F46 | 57.25 | 60.70 | 63.97 | 57.35 | 59.99 | 61.61 | 63.97 | WR |
| 2nd place, silver medalist(s) | Guo Chunliang (CHN) | F46 | 54.19 | 58.95 | 59.00 | 59.81 | 59.93 | 57.51 | 59.93 | |
| 3rd place, bronze medalist(s) | Dinesh Priyantha (SRI) | F46 | 54.67 | 58.23 | 52.58 | 57.14 | 54.43 | 51.39 | 58.23 | PB |
| 4 | Mohammad Fathiganji (IRI) | F46 | 49.51 | 54.67 | x | 47.68 | x | 50.30 | 54.67 | PB |
| 5 | Rinku (IND) | F46 | 48.81 | 47.99 | 53.59 | 49.72 | 54.39 | 53.70 | 54.39 | PB |
| 6 | Eliezer Gabriel Buenaventura (MEX) | F46 | 49.79 | 50.46 | x | 51.76 | 49.91 | 50.61 | 51.76 | RR |
| 7 | Mahmoud Ismail (javelin) (EGY) | F46 | 49.80 | 47.36 | x | 49.47 | 49.77 | 50.32 | 50.32 | SB |
| 8 | Abrahan Ortega (VEN) | F46 | 46.32 | 48.45 | 49.07 | 47.54 | 48.91 | 49.94 | 49.94 | SB |
| 9 | Gamini Ekanayake Ketawala Gedara (SRI) | F46 | 48.84 | x | 47.98 | | | | 48.84 | |
| 10 | Mathias Schulze (GER) | F46 | 46.73 | 45.42 | 48.84 | | | | 48.84 | |
| 11 | Aliaksandr Subota (BLR) | F46 | 38.73 | 44.75 | 42.36 | | | | 44.75 | |
| 12 | Sione Manu (TGA) | F46 | 35.62 | x | 31.09 | | | | 35.62 | PB |
| | Gurjar Sundar Singh (IND) | F46 | | | | | | | | DNS |

=== F54 ===
| Rank | Athlete | Nationality | Class | 1 | 2 | 3 | 4 | 5 | 6 | Best | Notes |
|---|---|---|---|---|---|---|---|---|---|---|---|
| 1st place, gold medalist(s) | Manolis Stefanoudakis | Greece | F54 | 29.45 | 29.42 | x | 27.47 | 28.02 | 28.84 | 29.45 | PR |
| 2nd place, silver medalist(s) | Luis Alberto Zepeda Felix | Mexico | F54 | 20.54 | 24.02 | 25.03 | x | 25.85 | 25.92 | 25.92 | SB |
| 3rd place, bronze medalist(s) | Aliaksandr Tryputs | Belarus | F54 | x | x | 23.00 | 23.56 | x | x | 23.56 | |
| 4 | José Rodrigues | Brazil | F54 | 22.53 | x | x | 23.41 | x | 22.32 | 23.41 | |
| 5 | Alphanso Cunningham | Jamaica | F53 | 19.49 | x | 18.11 | x | 17.75 | x | 19.49 | SB |

=== F57 ===
| Rank | Athlete | Nationality | Class | 1 | 2 | 3 | 4 | 5 | 6 | Best | Notes |
|---|---|---|---|---|---|---|---|---|---|---|---|
| 1st place, gold medalist(s) | Mohammad Khalvandi | Iran | F57 | 45.26 | 45.63 | 43.89 | 44.24 | 45.85 | 46.12 | 46.12 | WR |
| 2nd place, silver medalist(s) | Abdollah Heidari Til | Iran | F57 | 42.03 | 43.77 | 40.82 | x | x | 41.91 | 43.77 | PB |
| 3rd place, bronze medalist(s) | Cao Ngoc Hung | Vietnam | F57 | 42.96 | x | 39.64 | 43.27 | x | 40.94 | 43.27 | SB |
| 4 | Cicero Nobre | Brazil | F57 | 40.95 | 42.90 | 40.58 | 41.04 | 41.93 | 41.09 | 42.90 | AR |
| 5 | Claudiney Batista dos Santos | Brazil | F56 | 42.74 | x | 41.84 | 36.05 | 38.36 | 39.99 | 42.74 | WR |
| 6 | Sakchai Yimbanchang | Thailand | F57 | 40.47 | 39.19 | 40.22 | 36.25 | 41.44 | 42.00 | 42.00 | SB |
| 7 | Youssoupha Diouf | Senegal | F57 | 39.92 | 41.83 | 39.74 | 39.96 | 39.56 | 40.15 | 41.83 | SB |
| 8 | Mahmoud Ramadan El Attar | Egypt | F57 | 38.17 | 38.81 | 38.94 | 37.95 | x | x | 38.94 | |
| 9 | Virender | India | F57 | 34.21 | 33.67 | 35.73 | | | | 35.73 | |
| 10 | Mohamad Mohamad | Syria | F57 | x | 32.72 | x | | | | 32.72 | SB |
| 11 | Wu Guoshan | China | F57 | 32.31 | 32.21 | 31.70 | | | | 32.31 | PB |
| 12 | Roddy-Michaël Stéphane Mokolongo | Central African Republic | F57 | 25.91 | 24.57 | 28.32 | | | | 28.32 | PB |
| 13 | Cosme Akpovi | Benin | F57 | 25.65 | 27.37 | 25.09 | | | | 27.37 | PB |
| 14 | Cyril Charles | Seychelles | F57 | x | 16.97 | 16.44 | | | | 16.97 | SB |
