= 2016 IPC Athletics European Championships – Men's javelin throw =

2016 IPC Championships

The men's javelin at the 2016 IPC Athletics European Championships was held at the Stadio Olimpico Carlo Zecchini in Grosseto from 11-16 June.

== Medalists ==
Event	Gold		Silver		Bronze	
F11	Vitalii Telesh; Russia	42.01	—		—	
F13	Branimir Budetic; Croatia	65.74 WR	Hector Cabrera Llacer (F12); Spain	62.28 ER	Nemanja Dimitrijević; Serbia	60.15 PB
F34	Radmilo Baranin; Montenegro	20.17 PB	Sergei Diorditca; Russia	17.16	—	
F37/F38	Dmitrijs Silovs (F37); Latvia	54.86 ER; 1055 pts	Alexandr Lyashchenko (F37); Russia	47.97 PB; 948 pts	Petr Vratil (F38); Czech Republic	39.85; 775 pts
F40/F41	Yan Shkulka (F40); Russia	31.31 ER; 897 pts	Mathias Mester (F41); Germany	37.84; 839 pts	Bartosz Tyszkowski (F41); Poland	36.24 PB; 788 pts
F44	Helgi Sveinsson (F42); Iceland	55.42 CR	Jonas Spudis (F44); Lithuania	52.72 PB	Runar Steinstad (F42); Norway	50.34 PB
F46	Aliaksandr Subota; Belarus	49.02 CR	Matthias Uwe Schulze; Germany	45.83 SB	Andrius Skuja; Lithuania	39.12 PB
F54	Alexey Kuznetsov; Russia	29.91 WR	Manolis Stefanoudakis; Greece	28.96 SB	Aliaksandr Tryputs; Belarus	25.47
F55	Miloš Zarić; Serbia	30.86 CR	Mustafa Yuseinov; Bulgaria	29.73	Nebojša Đurić; Serbia	28.46 PB
F57	Marcelin Walico; France	34.56 CR	Alexander Pyatkov; Russia	30.17	Musa Davulcu; Turkey	29.33 SB
WR world record | AR area record | CR championship record | GR games record | NR national record | OR Olympic record | PB personal best | SB season best | WL world leading (in a given season)

== See also ==
- List of IPC world records in athletics
