= 2016 IPC Athletics European Championships – Men's discus throw =

The men's discus throw at the 2016 IPC Athletics European Championships was held at the Stadio Olimpico Carlo Zecchini in Grosseto from 11–16 June.

== Medalists ==
Event	Gold		Silver		Bronze	
F11	Oney Tapia; Italy	42.56 CR	David Casinos Sierra; Spain	38.37 SB	Sergei Shatalov; Russia	38.47 PB
F12	Kim Lopez Gonzalez; Spain	44.25	Marek Wietecki; Poland	43.83	Hector Cabrera Llacer; Spain	41.18 PB
F34	Nikita Oblepov; Russia	25.08 CR	Daniel Scheil (F33); Germany	25.07	Evgenii Malykh (F33); Russia	22.66
F37	Mindaugas Bilius; Lithuania	49.23	Ronni Jensen; Denmark	47.70	Joshua Bain; Great Britain	44.18
F42	Aled Davies; Great Britain	54.14 WR	Tom Habscheid; Luxembourg	45.41 PB	Dechko Ovcharov; Russia	38.47
F44-F46	Dan Greaves (F44); Great Britain	58.15; 1008 pts	Ivan Katanušić (F44); Croatia	55.59; 970 pts	Adrian Matusik (F44); Slovakia	49.98; 863 pts
F52	Robert Jachimowicz; Poland	19.42	Velimir Šandor; Croatia	18.53 PB	Kestutis Skucas; Lithuania	16.19 PB
F56	Ruzhdi Ruzhdi (F55); Bulgaria	39.33 CR	Slobodan Miletic (F55); Serbia	38.24 PB	Mustafa Yuseinov (F55); Bulgaria	37.24
F57	Miroslav Petkovic; Croatia	42.84 CR	Janusz Rokicki; Poland	42.53 SB	Alexey Ashapatov; Russia	40.20
WR world record | AR area record | CR championship record | GR games record | NR national record | OR Olympic record | PB personal best | SB season best | WL world leading (in a given season)

== Results ==
=== F11 ===
Rank	Athlete	Result	Notes
1st place, gold medalist(s)	Oney Tapia; Italy	42.56	
2nd place, silver medalist(s)	David Casinos Sierra; Spain	38.37	
3rd place, bronze medalist(s)	Sergei Shatalov; Russia	37.39	
4	Vitalii Telesh; Russia	35.39	
5	Bil Marinkovic; Austria	34.97	
6	Miroslaw Madzia; Poland	34.63	
7	Dusko Sretenovic; Serbia	32.14	
8	Nelson Goncalves; Portugal	27.00	

=== F12 ===
Rank	Athlete	Result	Notes
1st place, gold medalist(s)	Kim Lopez Gonzalez; Spain	44.25	
2nd place, silver medalist(s)	Marek Wietecki; Poland	43.83	
3rd place, bronze medalist(s)	Héctor Cabrera Llácer; Spain	41.18	
4	Yury Buchkou; Belarus	39.97	
5	Stefan Dimitrijevic; Serbia	35.70	
6	Joel Jansson; Sweden	29.87	

=== F34 ===
Rank	Athlete	Class	Result	Notes
1st place, gold medalist(s)	Nikita Oblepov; Russia	F34	25.08	
2nd place, silver medalist(s)	Daniel Scheil; Germany	F33	25.07	
3rd place, bronze medalist(s)	Evgenii Malykh; Russia	F33	22.66	
4	Radmilo Baranin; Montenegro	F34	22.09	
5	Martin Dvorak; Czech Republic	F34	21.39	

=== F37 ===
Rank	Athlete	Result	Notes
1st place, gold medalist(s)	Mindaugas Bilius; Lithuania	49.23	
2nd place, silver medalist(s)	Ronni Jensen; Denmark	47.70	
3rd place, bronze medalist(s)	Joshua Bain; Great Britain	44.18	
4	Tomasz Blatkiewicz; Poland	43.65	
5	Donatas Dundzys; Lithuania	41.27	
6	Alexandr Lyashchenko; Russia	34.85	
7	Jiri Kohout; Czech Republic	33.07	
8	Michal Pallag; Czech Republic	32.60	
9	Simone Giovarruscio; Italy	29.90	
10	Lukasz Czarnecki; Poland	23.62	
—	Timo Mustikkamaa; Finland	DQ	

=== F42 ===
Rank	Athlete	Result	Notes
1st place, gold medalist(s)	Aled Davies; Great Britain	54.14	WR
2nd place, silver medalist(s)	Tom Habscheid; Luxembourg	45.41	
3rd place, bronze medalist(s)	Dechko Ovcharov; Bulgaria	38.47	
4	Badr Touzi; France	38.42	
5	Mohammad Al-Joburi; Sweden	37.49	
6	Jaroslav Petrous; Czech Republic	33.32	

=== F44-46 ===
Rank	Athlete	Class	Result	Notes
1st place, gold medalist(s)	Dan Greaves; Great Britain	F44	58.15	
2nd place, silver medalist(s)	Ivan Katanušić; Croatia	F44	55.59	
3rd place, bronze medalist(s)	Adrian Matusik; Slovakia	F44	49.98	
4	Josip Slivar; Croatia	F44	48.29	
5	Matthias Uwe Schulze; Germany	F46	41.41	
6	Egert Jõesaar; Estonia	F44	44.25	
7	Andrius Skuja; Lithuania	F46	38.68	
8	Alexander Filatov; Russia	F44	39.40	

=== F52 ===
Rank	Athlete	Result	Notes
1st place, gold medalist(s)	Robert Jachimowicz; Poland	19.42	
2nd place, silver medalist(s)	Velimir Sandor; Croatia	18.53	
3rd place, bronze medalist(s)	Kestutis Skucas; Lithuania	16.19	
4	Adrian Imianowski; Poland	16.18	
5	Henrik Plank; Slovenia	15.50	

=== F56 ===
Rank	Athlete	Class	Result	Notes
1st place, gold medalist(s)	Ruzhdi Ruzhdi; Bulgaria	F55	39.33	
2nd place, silver medalist(s)	Slobodan Miletic; Serbia	F55	38.24	
3rd place, bronze medalist(s)	Mustafa Yuseinov; Bulgaria	F55	37.24	
4	Duric Nebojsa; Serbia	F55	37.22	
5	Aleksandr Spitcin; Russia	F55	34.48	
6	Ilias Nalmpantis; Greece	F55	32.91	
7	Aleksi Kirjonen; Finland	F56	31.41	
8	Ture Lund; Denmark	F56	31.14	
9	Bashar Madjid Mekkalaf; Italy	F55	30.43	
10	Ramunas Verbavicius; Lithuania	F55	29.81	

=== F57 ===
Rank	Athlete	Result	Notes
1st place, gold medalist(s)	Miroslav Petkovic; Croatia	42.84	
2nd place, silver medalist(s)	Janusz Rokicki; Poland	42.53	
3rd place, bronze medalist(s)	Alexey Ashapatov; Russia	40.20	
4	Alexander Pyatkov; Russia	42.11	

== See also ==
- List of IPC world records in athletics
