= Afghanistan at the 2016 Summer Paralympics =

- IPC code: AFG
- NPC: Afghanistan Paralympic Committee

in Rio de Janeiro
- Competitors: 1 in 1 sport
- Flag bearer: Mohammad Durani
- Medals: Gold 0 Silver 0 Bronze 0 Total 0

Summer Paralympics appearances (overview)
- 1996; 2000; 2004; 2008; 2012; 2016; 2020; 2024

Afghanistan sent a delegation to compete at the 2016 Summer Paralympics in Rio de Janeiro, Brazil, from 7–18 September 2016. This was the nation's fifth time taking part in a Summer Paralympic Games. The Afghan delegation consisted of a single athlete, Mohammad Durani, who competed in the javelin throw. Originally he finished 16th in his event, but he was retroactively disqualified for a doping violation.

== Background ==
Afghanistan made its Paralympic debut at the 1996 Summer Paralympics in Atlanta, United States. With the exception of the 2000 Summer Paralympics, they have sent a delegation to every Summer Paralympics since, making Rio the nation's fifth time participating at the Paralympics. They have never participated in the Winter Paralympic Games, and have never won a Paralympic medal. The 2016 Summer Paralympics were held from 7–18 September 2016 with a total of 4,328 athletes representing 159 National Paralympic Committees taking part. Athlete Mohammad Durani was the only competitor for Afghanistan in Rio. He was chosen as the flag bearer for the opening ceremony.

== Disability classifications ==
Every participant at the Paralympics has their disability grouped into one of five disability categories: amputation, which may be congenital or sustained through injury or illness; cerebral palsy; wheelchair athletes, though there is often overlap between this and other categories; visual impairment, including blindness; and Les autres, which is any physical disability that does not fall strictly under one of the other categories, like dwarfism or multiple sclerosis. Each Paralympic sport then has its own classifications, dependent upon the specific physical demands of competition. Events are given a code, made of numbers and letters, describing the type of event and classification of the athletes competing. Some sports, such as athletics, divide athletes by both the category and severity of their disabilities. Other sports, for example swimming, group competitors from different categories together, the only separation being based on the severity of the disability.

== Athletics ==
Mohammad Durani was 42 years old at the time of the Rio de Janeiro Paralympics. He competed in the men's javelin throw for athletes classified between F42–F44 on 9 September. He finished with a personal best of 26.51 meters, but that put him into last place, and thus not allowed to proceed to the final three throws. However, on 19 September, it was revealed he had tested positive for 19-Norandrosterone, a substance the World Anti-Doping Agency classifies under its list of "Endogenous Anabolic Androgenic Steroids" and is banned in both in-competition and out-of-competition testing; accordingly Durani was disqualified and his result annulled. The gold medal went to Akeem Stewart of Trinidad and Tobago, the silver medal was won by Alister McQueen of Canada, and the bronze was taken by New Zealand's Rory McSweeney.

Athlete	Events	Result	Rank
Mohammad Durani	Javelin F42-44	DSQ	–

== See also ==
- Afghanistan at the 2016 Summer Olympics
