= 2015 IPC Athletics World Championships – Men's javelin throw =

The men's javelin throw at the 2015 IPC Athletics World Championships was held at the Suheim Bin Hamad Stadium in Doha from 22–31 October.

== Medalists ==
Event	Gold		Silver		Bronze	
F11	Vitalii Telesh; Russia	41.93 SB	Roman Mesyk; Ukraine	40.80	Jose Alexis Belizario Angulo; Colombia	40.19 SB
F13	Branimir Budetic (F13); Croatia	65.72 WR	Seyed Erfan Hosseini Liravi (F12); Iran	59.97 SB	Nemanja Dimitrijević (F13); Serbia	59.82 PB
F34	Wang Yanzhang; China	38.05	Mauricio Valencia; Colombia	34.38 SB	Mohsen Kaedi; Iran	32.26
F37	Zhang Xuelong; China	51.26 SB	Dmitrijs Silovs; Latvia	50.48 AR	Xia Dong; China	49.55
F38	Reinhardt Hamman; South Africa	50.06 CR	Oleksandr Doroshenko; Ukraine	48.44 PB	Petr Vratil; Czech Republic	46.17 PB
F41	Sun Pengxiang; China	43.67 WR	Kovan Abdulraheem; Iraq	40.93	Kyron Duke; Great Britain	37.99 SB
F44	Márcio Fernandes (F44); Cape Verde	56.24 AR	Rory McSweeney (F44); New Zealand	55.80 AR	Helgi Sveinsson (F42); Iceland	55.18 CR
F46	Guo Chunliang; China	61.89 CR	Devendra Jhajharia; India	59.06	Abdolrasoul Mirshekari; Iran	53.85 PB
F54	Manolis Stefanoudakis; Greece	28.45	Jose Rodrigues; Brazil	28.33 AR	Alexey Kuznetsov; Russia	27.56 SB
F55	Mustafa Yuseinov; Bulgaria	32.01 CR	Miloš Zarić; Serbia	31.13 PB	Jonas Licurgo Ferreira; Brazil	30.56 AR
F57	Mohammad Khalvandi; Iran	43.76	Mohamad Mohamad; Syria	41.85	Claudiney Batista dos Santos; Brazil	41.70
WR world record | AR area record | CR championship record | GR games record | NR national record | OR Olympic record | PB personal best | SB season best | WL world leading (in a given season)

== See also ==
- List of IPC world records in athletics
