= 2013 IPC Athletics World Championships – Men's javelin throw =

The men's javelin throw at the 2013 IPC Athletics World Championships was held at the Stade du Rhône from 20–29 July.

== Medalists ==
Class	Gold	Silver	Bronze
F11	Anibal Bello; Venezuela	Vitalii Telesh; Russia	Bil Marinkovic; Austria
F12/13	Chiang Chih-chung; Chinese Taipei	Branimir Budetic; Croatia	Sajad Nikparast; Iran
F33/34	Mohsen Kaedi; Iran	Wang Yanzhang; China	Mauricio Valencia; Colombia
F37/38	Reinhardt Hamman; South Africa	Dmitrijs Silovs; Latvia	Jayden Sawyer; Australia
F41	Mathias Mester; Germany	Kyron Duke; United Kingdom	Ivan Bogatyrev; Russia
F42	Helgi Sveinsson; Iceland	Fu Yanlong; China	Runar Steinstad; Norway
F44	Tony Falelavaki; France	Marcio Fernandes; Cape Verde	Ali Omidi; Iran
F46	Devendra Jhajharia; India	Abdolrasoul Mirshekari; Iran	Mahmoud Ismail (javelin); Egypt
F52/53	Alphanso Cunningham; Jamaica	Abdolreza Jokar; Iran	Georgios Karaminas; Greece
F54/55/56	Luis Zepeda; Mexico	Alexey Kuznetsov; Russia	Manolis Stefanoudakis; Greece
F57/58	Mohammad Khalvandi; Iran	Claudiney Santos; Brazil	Raed Salam; Egypt

== See also ==
- List of IPC world records in athletics
