= Afghanistan at the Paralympics =

- Flag of Afghanistan
- IPC code: AFG
- NPC: Afghanistan Paralympic Committee
- Medals: Gold 0 Silver 0 Bronze 0 Total 0

Summer appearances
- 1996; 2000; 2004; 2008; 2012; 2016; 2020; 2024

Afghanistan first competed at the Paralympic Games during the 1996 Summer Paralympics in Atlanta, where it was represented by cyclists Gul Afzal and Zabet Khan.

== History ==
Afghanistan did not participate in the Sydney Paralympics in 2000, having been banned from the Games due to its treatment of women under Taliban rule.

Two athletes represented Afghanistan in Athens in 2004: female sprinter Mareena Karim and male cyclist Qaher Hazrat. Neither won a medal.

Afghanistan competed at the 2008 Summer Paralympics in Beijing, where it was represented solely by powerlifter Mohammad Fahim Rahimi. Rahimi returned to powerlifting at the 2012 Summer Paralympics in London. Again, he was the sole athlete representing his country at the Paralympic Games.

Afghanistan sent one athlete again to Rio de Janeiro for the 2016 Summer Paralympics, Mohammad Durani. He competed in the men's javelin throw. He finished with a personal best of 26.51 meters, but that put him into last place, and thus not allowed to proceed to the final three throws. However, on 19 September 2016, it was revealed he had tested positive for 19-Norandrosterone, a substance the World Anti-Doping Agency classifies under its list of "Endogenous Anabolic Androgenic Steroids" and is banned in both in-competition and out-of-competition testing. Therefore, Durani was disqualified and his result annulled.

Afghanistan was due to compete in the 2020 Summer Paralympics with taekwondo athlete Zakia Khudadadi and track athlete Hossain Rasouli as representatives. However, Afghanistan was forced to withdraw following the Fall of Kabul to the Taliban. Khudaddi was to be the first female Afghan Paralympian since 2004.

On 28 August 2021, Zakia Khudadadi and Hossain Rasouli arrived in Tokyo after taking a flight en route from Kabul to Paris and it also ended the uncertainties which prevailed regarding Afghanistan's participation at the Tokyo Paralympics. The President of International Paralympic Committee, Andrew Parsons revealed that both of the Afghan athletes would not be available for interviews and also insisted that permission has been granted to them to skip the usual press conferences.

Afghanistan’s status is unclear for future participations since brought under the political turmoil.

Afghanistan has never won a Paralympic medal, and has never participated in the Winter Paralympic Games.

== Medal tables ==
=== Medals by Summer Games ===
Afghanistan has competed at five Summer Paralympic Games. Afghanistan has only missed out Sydney 2000 since its debut, due to its banning by the IOC.

Games	Athletes	Gold	Silver	Bronze	Total
(United States) 1996 Atlanta	2	0	0	0	0
(Australia) 2000 Sydney	did not participate				
(Greece) 2004 Athens	2	0	0	0	0
(China) 2008 Beijing	1	0	0	0	0
(United Kingdom) 2012 London	1	0	0	0	0
(Brazil) 2016 Rio de Janeiro	1	0	0	0	0
(Japan) 2020 Tokyo	2	0	0	0	0
(France) 2024 Paris	?	0	0	0	0
(United States) 2028 Los Angeles	future event				
(Australia) 2032 Brisbane	future event				
Total	6	0	0	0	0

=== Medals by Winter Games ===
Afghanistan is yet to participate at the Winter Paralympics.

Games	Athletes	Gold	Silver	Bronze	Total
(China) 2022 Beijing	did not participate				
(Italy) 2026 Cortina d'Ampezzo	did not participate				
Total	0	0	0	0	0

== See also ==
- Category:Paralympic competitors for Afghanistan
- Afghanistan at the Olympics
- Afghanistan at the Asian Games
- Sports in Afghanistan
