= Disability in Afghanistan =

According to Model Disability Survey of Afghanistan by the Asia Foundation in 2019, around 80% of the adults in Afghanistan had some form of disability.

== Distributions ==
Among those with disability, 24.6% experienced mild disability, 40.4% experienced moderate disability and 13.9% experienced severe disability. For severe disabilities, the prevalent areas of distribution are West (25.4%), Central Highlands (25.4%) and South East region (20.5%). The majority of the obstacles faced by those with moderate and severe disabilities are challenges in mobility, socializing, employment and education.

== See also ==
- Afghanistan at the Paralympics
