= Kovan Abdulraheem =

Iraqi Paralympic athlete (born 1988)

Personal information
- Born: 1 March 1988 (age 38) Duhok, Iraq

Sport
- Country: Iraq
- Sport: Para-athletics
- Disability: Short stature
- Disability class: F41
- Events: Discus throw; Javelin throw; Shot put
Medal record
Paralympic Games
Gold medal – first place	2016 Rio de Janeiro	Javelin throw F41
World Championships
Gold medal – first place	2011 Christchurch	Javelin throw F40
Silver medal – second place	2015 Doha	Javelin throw F41
Bronze medal – third place	2019 Dubai	Javelin throw F41
Asian Para Games
Bronze medal – third place	2010 Guangzhou	Shot put F40
Bronze medal – third place	2014 Incheon	Shot put F41
Bronze medal – third place	2014 Incheon	Discus throw F41
Bronze medal – third place	2018 Jakarta	Shot put F41

Kovan Abdulraheem (born 1 March 1988 in Duhok) is an Iraqi Kurdish Paralympic athlete of short stature and he competes in F41-classification throwing events. He won the gold medal in the men's javelin throw F41 event at the 2016 Summer Paralympics held in Rio de Janeiro, Brazil.

== Career ==
He represented Iraq at the 2012 Summer Paralympics and at the 2016 Summer Paralympics. In 2016, he won the gold medal in the men's javelin throw F41 event with a distance of 42.85m. In 2019, he qualified to represent Iraq at the 2020 Summer Paralympics after winning the bronze medal in the men's javelin throw F41 event at the 2019 World Championships held in Dubai, United Arab Emirates.

At the 2015 World Championships held in Doha, Qatar, he won the silver medal in the men's javelin throw F41 event.

== Achievements ==
Year	Competition	Venue	Position	Event	Notes
Representing Iraq
2011	World Championships	Christchurch, New Zealand	1st	Javelin throw	36.32 m
2015	World Championships	Doha, Qatar	2nd	Javelin throw	40.93 m
2016	Summer Paralympics	Rio de Janeiro, Brazil	1st	Javelin throw	42.85 m
2019	World Championships	Dubai, United Arab Emirates	3rd	Javelin throw	42.24 m
