= Advance Party =

Advance Party may refer to:

- Advance party, a group sent ahead of a military force to perform reconnaissance
- Advance Party (film series), a projected trilogy of films that are Scottish/Danish co-productions, of which the first is Red Road
- Advance Party (religious movement), a one part of Brahma Kumaris spiritual family
- The Chief Scouts' Advance Party Report, a 1966 publication proposing reform of the Boy Scouts' Association in the United Kingdom
- Advance New Zealand (1995), a short-lived political party led by England So'onalole in the 1996 election
- Advance New Zealand, a separate short-lived political party led by Jami-Lee Ross in the 2020 general election
- Advance UK, a far-right political party in the United Kingdom, led by Ben Habib since 2025
