= Afghanistan at the 1996 Summer Paralympics =

- IPC code: AFG
- NPC: Afghanistan Paralympic Committee

in Atlanta
- Competitors: 2 in 1 sport
- Medals: Gold 0 Silver 0 Bronze 0 Total 0

Summer Paralympics appearances (overview)
- 1996; 2000; 2004; 2008; 2012; 2016; 2020; 2024

Afghanistan participated in the 1996 Summer Paralympics in Atlanta, United States. It was the country's first participation in the Paralympic Games. Afghanistan was represented by two athletes, Gul Afzal and Zabet Khan, who both competed in road cycling. Neither athlete won a medal.

== See also ==
- 1996 Summer Paralympics
- Afghanistan at the Paralympics
- Afghanistan at the 1996 Summer Olympics
