= Mareena Karim =

Afghan track and field athlete

Mareena Karim (Dari: مارنا کریم), born in 1989 or 1990, is an Afghan track and field athlete.

As a baby, she was left too close to a stove and suffered severe burns to both feet, which were subsequently amputated. As an athlete, she therefore competes as a Paralympian (T46 category).

Karim was the first woman ever to officially represent Afghanistan at the Paralympic Games when she competed in the 100 metres sprint at the 2004 Summer Paralympics in Athens. She finished last in her heat with a time of 18.85 seconds and did not advance to the next round.

At the time of the 2004 Paralympics, Karim lived in Kabul with her ten brothers and eight sisters. Her family had fled fighting between the Northern Alliance and the Taliban in Kapisa.

== See also ==
- Robina Muqimyar
- Qaher Hazrat
- Afghanistan at the Paralympics
