= Mauricio Valencia =

Colombian Paralympic athlete (born 1987)

Personal information
- Born: 28 December 1987 (age 38)

Sport
- Country: Colombia
- Sport: Para-athletics
- Disability: Cerebral palsy
- Disability class: F32; F33; F34
- Events: Discus throw; Javelin throw; Shot put
Medal record
Representing Colombia
Men's para-athletics
Event	1st	2nd	3rd
Paralympic Games	2	2	1
World Championships	2	5	6
Parapan American Games	4	3	0
Total	8	10	7
Paralympic Games
Gold medal – first place	2016 Rio de Janeiro	Javelin throw F34
Gold medal – first place	2024 Paris	Shot put F34
Silver medal – second place	2020 Tokyo	Javelin throw F34
Silver medal – second place	2024 Paris	Javelin throw F34
Bronze medal – third place	2016 Rio de Janeiro	Shot put F34
World Championships
Gold medal – first place	2017 London	Javelin throw F34
Gold medal – first place	2019 Dubai	Javelin throw F34
Silver medal – second place	2015 Doha	Discus throw F34
Silver medal – second place	2015 Doha	Javelin throw F34
Silver medal – second place	2023 Paris	Shot put F34
Silver medal – second place	2023 Paris	Javelin throw F34
Silver medal – second place	2024 Kobe	Javelin throw F34
Bronze medal – third place	2013 Lyon	Javelin throw F33/F34
Bronze medal – third place	2015 Doha	Shot put F34
Bronze medal – third place	2017 London	Shot put F34
Bronze medal – third place	2019 Dubai	Shot put F34
Bronze medal – third place	2025 New Delhi	Shot put F34
Bronze medal – third place	2025 New Delhi	Javelin throw F34
Parapan American Games
Gold medal – first place	2011 Guadalajara	Discus throw F32/33/34
Gold medal – first place	2019 Lima	Shot put F32/33/34
Gold medal – first place	2019 Lima	Javelin throw F34
Gold medal – first place	2023 Santiago	Shot put F32/33/34
Silver medal – second place	2011 Guadalajara	Shot put F32/33/34
Silver medal – second place	2015 Toronto	Shot put F32/33/34
Silver medal – second place	2015 Toronto	Javelin throw F34/57

Mauricio Valencia (born 28 December 1987) is a Colombian Paralympic athlete with cerebral palsy. He represented Colombia at the Summer Paralympics in 2012, 2016 and 2021. At the 2016 Summer Paralympics, he won two medals (in F34 class): the gold medal in the men's javelin throw and the bronze medal in the men's shot put. In 2021, he won the silver medal in the men's javelin throw F34 event at the 2020 Summer Paralympics held in Tokyo, Japan.

== Career ==
He represented Colombia at the 2011 Parapan American Games held in Guadalajara, Mexico. In total he won two medals: the gold medal in the men's discus throw F32/33/34 event and the silver medal in the men's shot put F32/33/34 event.

At the 2013 World Championships held in Lyon, France, he won the bronze medal in the men's javelin throw F33/34 event. Two years later, at the 2015 World Championships held in Doha, Qatar, he won three medals: the silver medal in both the men's discus throw F34 and men's javelin throw F34 events and the bronze medal in the men's shot put F34 event. In 2017, he won gold in the men's javelin throw F34 event and bronze in the men's shot put F34 event.

In the men's javelin throw F34 event at the 2019 World Championships held in Dubai, United Arab Emirates he won the gold medal with a distance of 35.25m. He also won the bronze medal in the men's shot put F34 event.

== Achievements ==
Year	Competition	Venue	Position	Event	Notes
2011	Parapan American Games	Guadalajara, Mexico	1st	Discus throw	
2011	Parapan American Games	Guadalajara, Mexico	2nd	Shot put	
2013	World Championships	Lyon, France	3rd	Javelin throw	
2016	Summer Paralympics	Rio de Janeiro, Brazil	1st	Javelin throw	36.65 m
2016	Summer Paralympics	Rio de Janeiro, Brazil	3rd	Shot put	11.10 m
2015	World Championships	Doha, Qatar	2nd	Discus throw	35.06 m
2015	World Championships	Doha, Qatar	2nd	Javelin throw	34.38 m
2015	World Championships	Doha, Qatar	3rd	Shot put	10.93 m
2017	World Championships	London, United Kingdom	1st	Javelin throw	35.21 m
2017	World Championships	London, United Kingdom	3rd	Shot put	10.89 m
2019	Parapan American Games	Lima, Peru	1st	Javelin throw	
2019	Parapan American Games	Lima, Peru	1st	Shot put	
2019	World Championships	Dubai, United Arab Emirates	1st	Javelin throw	35.25 m
2019	World Championships	Dubai, United Arab Emirates	3rd	Shot put	11.35 m
2021	Summer Paralympics	Tokyo, Japan	2nd	Javelin throw	37.84 m
2023	World Championships	Paris, France	2nd	Javelin throw	38.01 m
