= Afghanistan at the 2012 Summer Paralympics =

- IPC code: AFG
- NPC: Afghanistan Paralympic Committee

in London
- Competitors: 1 in 1 sport
- Flag bearer: Mohammad Fahim Rahimi
- Medals: Gold 0 Silver 0 Bronze 0 Total 0

Summer Paralympics appearances (overview)
- 1996; 2000; 2004; 2008; 2012; 2016; 2020; 2024

Afghanistan competed at the 2012 Summer Paralympics in London, United Kingdom from August 29 to September 9, 2012.

== Powerlifting ==
Men

Athlete	Event	Result	Rank
Mohammad Fahim Rahimi	-75kg	127	12

== See also ==
- Afghanistan at the 2012 Summer Olympics
