= Aleksandr Svechnikov =

Uzbekistani Paralympic athlete

Personal information
- Born: May 19, 1998 (age 28) Tashkent, Uzbekistan

Sport
- Country: Uzbekistan
- Sport: Para-athletics
- Disability: Vision impairment
- Disability class: F13
- Event: Javelin throw
Medal record
Paralympic Games
Gold medal – first place	2016 Rio de Janeiro	Javelin throw F13
World Championships
Gold medal – first place	2017 London	Javelin throw F13
Islamic Solidarity Games
Gold medal – first place	2017 Baku	Javelin throw F13
Asian Para Games
Gold medal – first place	2018 Jakarta	Javelin throw F12/F13

Aleksandr Svechnikov (born 19 May 1998) is a visually impaired Uzbekistani Paralympic athlete competing in F13-classification javelin throw events. He represented Uzbekistan at the 2016 Summer Paralympics held in Rio de Janeiro, Brazil and he won the gold medal in the men's javelin throw F13 event.

At the 2017 Islamic Solidarity Games in Baku, Azerbaijan, he set a new world record in the men's javelin throw F13 event. A few months later, he won the gold medal in the men's javelin throw F13 event at the 2017 World Para Athletics Championships held in London, United Kingdom with a new world record of 71.01 m.
