= Afghanistan at the 2020 Summer Paralympics =

- Flag of the Islamic Republic of Afghanistan
- IPC code: AFG
- NPC: Afghanistan Paralympic Committee

in Tokyo
- Competitors: 2 in 2 sports
- Flag bearer: Games volunteer
- Medals: Gold 0 Silver 0 Bronze 0 Total 0

Summer Paralympics appearances (overview)
- 1996; 2000; 2004; 2008; 2012; 2016; 2020; 2024

A delegation representing Afghanistan competed at the 2020 Summer Paralympics in Tokyo, Japan, from 24 August to 5 September 2021 which was postponed due to the COVID-19 pandemic. The Afghan delegation consisted of two athletes; Zakia Khudadadi in taekwondo and Hossain Rasouli in para-athletics. The former became Afghanistan's first female Paralympian.

After the Fall of Kabul on 15 August 2021, Afghanistan's participation was left uncertain due to the Taliban takeover of the country, but its athletes were later successfully evacuated. The delegation used the national symbols of the Islamic Republic of Afghanistan, the internationally recognized government which administered the country prior to the Taliban takeover.

== Background ==
Afghanistan's participation was made uncertain by the Taliban takeover of Afghanistan following the Fall of Kabul on 15 August 2021. The organizers of the Paralympics initially announced that Afghanistan would be unable to compete.

Afghanistan was represented in the Parade of Nations and the Office of the U.N. High Commissioner for Refugees (UNHCR) was invited to send a representative as a "sign of solidarity" despite the country's formal withdrawal. However the UNHCR declined to name a representative and a volunteer served as Afghanistan's flagbearer instead.

On 28 August 2021, Zakia Khudadadi and Hossain Rasouli arrived in Tokyo after taking a flight en route from Kabul to Paris. It was also announced that Afghanistan would be able to compete in the Paralympics. The President of International Paralympic Committee, Andrew Parsons, revealed that both of the Afghan athletes would not be available for interviews and also insisted that permission has been granted to them to skip the usual press conferences.

== Athletics ==
Para-athlete Hossain Rasouli was supposed to compete in the men's 100 metres T47 but arrived too late. He was entered in the men's long jump instead. Although he had competed in long jump before, the 2020 Paralympics marks the first time Rasouli took part in long jump in a major competition.

Athlete	Event	Final	
Athlete	Event	Result	Rank
Hossain Rasouli	Men's long jump T47	4.46	13

== Taekwondo ==
Athlete	Event	Round of 16	Quarterfinals	Semifinals	Repechage 1	Repechage 2	Final / BM	
Athlete	Event	Opposition Result	Opposition Result	Opposition Result	Opposition Result	Opposition Result	Opposition Result	Rank
Zakia Khudadadi	Women's 49 kg	Isakova (UZB); L 12–17	did not advance		Marchuk (UKR); L 34–48	did not advance		
