= Afghanistan at the 2004 Summer Paralympics =

- IPC code: AFG
- NPC: Afghanistan Paralympic Committee

in Athens
- Competitors: 3 in 2 sports
- Flag bearer: Qaher Hazrat
- Medals: Gold 0 Silver 0 Bronze 0 Total 0

Summer Paralympics appearances (overview)
- 1996; 2000; 2004; 2008; 2012; 2016; 2020; 2024

Afghanistan participated in the 2004 Summer Paralympics in Athens, Greece. It was reportedly the country's first "official" appearance at the Paralympic Games, although two cyclists had already competed for Afghanistan in 1996. The delegation consisted of two competitors, Mareena Karim and Qaher Hazrat. A third competitor, runner Sharifa Ahmadi, was registered for the games but did not participate.

== Sports ==
=== Athletics ===
==== Women's track ====
Athlete	Class	Event	Heats		Semifinal		Final	
Athlete	Class	Event	Result	Rank	Result	Rank	Result	Rank
Sharifa Ahmadi	T46	100m	DNS		did not advance			
Mareena Karim	T46	100m	18.85	15	did not advance			

=== Cycling ===
Athlete	Event	Time	Rank
Qaher Hazrat	Men's road race/time trial LC3	-	14

== See also ==
- Afghanistan at the Paralympics
- Afghanistan at the 2004 Summer Olympics
