= Qaher Hazrat =

Afghan cyclist

Personal information
- Full name: Qaher Hazrat
- Born: 1981 or 1982 (age 44–45) Pul-e-Charkhi, Afghanistan

Cycling career
- Sport: Cycling
- Discipline: Road
- Role: Rider

Qaher Hazrat (born 1981/1982 in Pul-e-Charkhi), is an Afghan cyclist. The International Paralympic Committee describes him as "one of the country's top speed cyclists – in both disabled and able-bodied competition".

At the age of 14, in 1996, he lost both legs below the knees when he stepped on a landmine.

Hazrat was the first man ever to officially represent Afghanistan at the Paralympic Games when he competed in road race cycling (time trial, LC3 disability category) at the 2004 Summer Paralympics in Athens. With 26 points, he finished last out of 14 cyclists in his event.

== See also ==
- Mareena Karim
- Afghanistan at the Paralympics
