= Afghanistan at the 2008 Summer Paralympics =

- IPC code: AFG
- NPC: Afghanistan Paralympic Committee

in Beijing
- Competitors: 1 in 1 sport
- Flag bearers: Mohammad Fahim Rahimi (opening & closing)
- Officials: 4
- Medals Ranked -th: Gold 0 Silver 0 Bronze 0 Total 0

Summer Paralympics appearances (overview)
- 1996; 2000; 2004; 2008; 2012; 2016; 2020; 2024

Afghanistan competed at the 2008 Summer Paralympics in Beijing, China. The country was represented by a single athlete, Mohammad Fahim Rahimi, who competed in powerlifting.

== Powerlifting ==
Men

Athlete	Class	Event	Result	Rank
Mohammad Fahim Rahimi	-	-67.5 kg	No Mark	-

== See also ==
- Afghanistan at the Paralympics
- Afghanistan at the 2008 Summer Olympics
