= Sajad Nikparast =

Iranian Paralympic athlete

Personal information
- Nationality: Iran
- Born: 21 September 1986 (age 39)

Sport
- Disability class: F12
- Club: Bushehr Province
- Coached by: Bahman Rezaei (national)
Medal record
Paralympic athletics
Representing Iran
Paralympic Games
Silver medal – second place	2012 London	Javelin Throw – F12/13
Silver medal – second place	2016 Rio de Janeiro	Javelin Throw – F13
World Championships
Silver medal – second place	2017 London	Javelin F12/13
Bronze medal – third place	2013 Lyon	Javelin F12/13
Bronze medal – third place	2024 Kobe	Javelin throw F13
Asian Para Games
Silver medal – second place	2014 Incheon	Javelin F12/13
Bronze medal – third place	2010 Guangzhou	Javelin F13

Sajad Nikparast (born 21 September 1986) is a visually impaired Paralympian athlete from Iran competing mainly in category F12 javelin events.

== Career ==
Nikparast represented his country at the 2012 Summer Paralympics in London, where he won the silver medal in the javelin. In 2013 he took bronze at the 2013 IPC Athletics World Championships in Lyon.
