= Afghanistan at the 2024 Summer Paralympics =

2024 sporting event delegation in Paris

- Flag of Afghanistan (Note: Afghanistan still competes under the tricolor flag used by the Islamic Republic and not the white banner preferred by the Taliban.)
- IPC code: AFG
- NPC: Afghanistan Paralympic Committee
- Website: www.afghanistan.paraolympics.50megs.com

in Paris, France August 28, 2024 – September 8, 2024
- Competitors: 1 (1 man) in 1 sport
- Flag bearer: Ebrahim Danishi
- Medals: Gold 0 Silver 0 Bronze 0 Total 0

Summer Paralympics appearances (overview)
- 1996; 2000; 2004; 2008; 2012; 2016; 2020; 2024

Afghanistan competed at the 2024 Summer Paralympics in Paris, France, from 28 August to 8 September 2024.

== Competitors ==
The following is the list of number of competitors in the Games, including game-eligible alternates in team sports.

Sport	Men	Women	Total
Taekwondo	1	0	1
Total	1	0	1

== Taekwondo ==
Afghanistan entered one athlete in the taekwondo event by finishing in third place in Asian Qualification Tournament.

Athlete	Event	Round of 16	Quarterfinals	Repechage	Semifinals	Final / BM	
Athlete	Event	Opposition Result	Opposition Result	Opposition Result	Opposition Result	Opposition Result	Rank
Ebrahim Danishi	Men's −58 kg	Xiao X-w (TPE); L 7–37	Did not advance				=9

== See also ==
- Afghanistan at the 2024 Summer Olympics
- Afghanistan at the Paralympics
