= Aled Davies (field athlete) =

Welsh Paralympic athlete

Aled Davies OBE
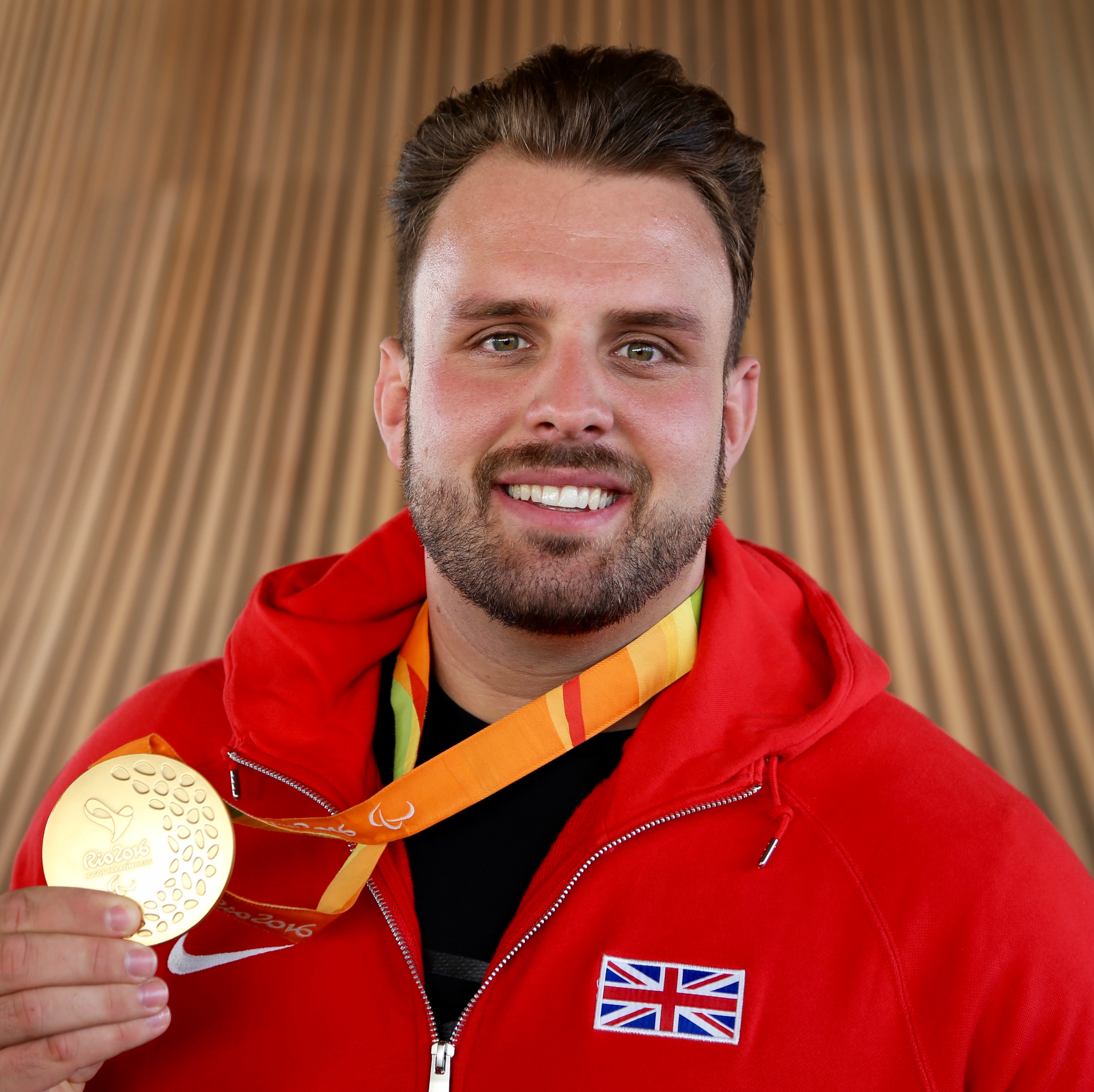
- Davies with his gold medal from the 2016 Paralympics

Personal information
- Full name: Aled Siôn Davies
- Nationality: British
- Born: 24 May 1991 (age 35) Bridgend, Wales, United Kingdom

Sport
- Country: Great Britain
- Sport: Athletics
- Events: F42 Shot put F42 Discus
- College team: UWIC/Cardiff Metropolitan
- Club: Cardiff AC
- Coached by: Ryan Spencer-Jones

Achievements and titles
- Paralympic finals: 2012, 2016, 2020
- Highest world ranking: Shot put 1st, Discus: 1st
- Personal bests: Shot Put: 17.52m WR; Discus: 54.14m WR
Medal record
Event	1st	2nd	3rd
Paralympic Games	3	1	1
World Championships	8	1	0
European Championships	4	0	0
Men's para-athletics
Representing Great Britain
Paralympic Games
Gold medal – first place	2012 London	Discus – F42
Gold medal – first place	2016 Rio	Shot put – F42
Gold medal – first place	2020 Tokyo	Shot put – F42
Silver medal – second place	2024 Paris	Shot put – F63
Bronze medal – third place	2012 London	Shot put – F42-44
World Championships
Gold medal – first place	2013 Lyon	Shot put – F42
Gold medal – first place	2013 Lyon	Discus – F42
Gold medal – first place	2015 Doha	Discus – F42
Gold medal – first place	2015 Doha	Shot put – F42
Gold medal – first place	2017 London	Discus throw – F42
Gold medal – first place	2017 London	Shot put – F42
Gold medal – first place	2023 Paris	Shot put – F63
Gold medal – first place	2025 New Delhi	Shot put – F63
Silver medal – second place	2011 Christchurch	Discus – F42
European Championships
Gold medal – first place	2014 Swansea	Shot put – F42
Gold medal – first place	2014 Swansea	Discus – F42
Gold medal – first place	2016 Grosseto	Discus – F42
Gold medal – first place	2016 Grosseto	Shot put – F42
Representing Wales
Commonwealth Games
Silver medal – second place	2014 Glasgow	Discus – F42/44

Aled Siôn Davies (born 24 May 1991) is a British Paralympian athlete competing mainly in category F42 throwing events. In 2012 he became the world record holder of the F42 shot put and in the 2012 Summer Paralympics he took the bronze medal in shot put and gold in the discus. In 2013 Davies took the World Championship gold in both the shot put and discus in Lyon. He won double gold in his home country at the 2014 IPC Athletics European Championships in the shot put and discus. This followed his silver medal in the F42-44 discus from the Commonwealth Games in Glasgow where he represented Wales. Davies also took part in the Channel 4 TV series Celebrity SAS: Who dares wins (series 3)

== Personal life ==
Davies was born in Bridgend in 1991. He was born with hemimelia of the right leg. From a young age Davies enjoyed sports, representing Wales as a child at swimming.

== Athletics career ==
=== Early career ===
In 2005 Davies switched to athletics deciding to commit to the shot put and discus. In 2009, Davies participated in the 2009 Welsh Open, winning both the shot put and discus. He followed this with a silver medal at the 2009 IWAS World Junior Championships and just missed the medal table with the discus after finishing fourth. Davies surpassed both achievements in 2010 when he became IWAS Junior champion in both F42 shot put and discus in the games at Olomouc in the Czech Republic.

Davies began 2011 by competing in the IPC World Championships in Christchurch, New Zealand. He finished 4th in the shot put but took 2nd place in the discus. In April he competed in his third IWAS Junior Championship, hosted in Dubai. He finished first in both discus and shot put, recording a personal best in the shot put. In May he threw a confirmed personal best in the discus at the Paralympic World Cup in Manchester giving him third place.

=== 2012 London Summer Paralympics ===
2012 saw Davies compete in the CP Sport Grand Prix held in Gateshead in the North of England. His shot put result of 14.56m was a world record in the F42 class. Davies continued 2012 with gold in both discus and shot put at the Croatian Open in Zagreb. Two weeks later, on 22 May, he competed in the Paralympic World Cup, finishing third, despite a personal best of 47.72m.

In 2012, Davies was selected for the Great Britain team in the shot put and discus for the 2012 Summer Paralympics in the F42-44 category. On 31 August 2012 he took the bronze medal in the shot put, recording a distance of 13.78, converting to 961 points. Two days later Davies took part in his second event at the Games, the T42 discus. His first throw was a distance of 45.31m, and although he bettered this slightly on his third throw (45.37), none of his competitors were able to better his initial result. On his last throw, Davies already knew he was the Paralympic champion, and with it set a European record of 46.14. Davies was appointed Member of the Order of the British Empire (MBE) in the 2013 New Year Honours for services to athletics.

In 2013 Davies qualified for both shot and discus as part of the British team for the 2013 IPC Athletics World Championships in Lyon, France. In the shot put Davies threw a distance of 14.71m, setting a new world record and securing the gold medal. He followed this three days later with gold in the F42 discus, making him a double world champion. Just days after his victories, Davies was informed that his favoured F42 discus event was to be dropped from the Paralympic program for the 2016 Games in Rio, a decision he campaigned to reverse. His performance at Lyon saw Davies becoming one of the five shortlisted competitors for BBC Wales Sports Personality of the Year 2013. Davies was also named Paralympic Sportsman of the Year at the 2013 Sports Journalists Association Awards.

In the close season of 2013/14, Davies underwent surgery to his foot. Despite believing he would struggle to regain early form he broke the world record in both the discus and shot put on 6 April 2014. He recorded a throw of 48.87m in the discus and 14.87m in the shot at the Weir Archer Academy in London in April 2014. The following month at the Cardiff Capital Throws in Leckwith he improved on his world record again in the shot. For the first time in his career he threw over 15 metres with a distance of 15.13m.

As part of the build up to the 2014 Commonwealth Games, Davies took part in the Queen's Baton Relay on its leg through Wales. Davies was joined by members of the Eryri Harriers Athletics Club as the baton was taken to the summit of Snowdon, the highest peak in Wales. At the Commonwealth Games, Davies, who was team captain, finished second behind England's Dan Greaves. Davies was hurt by failing to take the gold, and used the experience to spur him on at the forthcoming European Championships.

Davies returned to his home country to compete in the 2014 IPC Athletics European Championships as he aimed for double gold. Buoyed on by the home crowd, Davies did not disappoint. He took the gold in the shot put with a throw of 13.66m to win convincingly. The discus competition took part on the final day and Davies threw 46.46m to take his second gold medal of the Championships.

=== 2016 Rio Paralympics ===
In the build up to the 2016 Summer Paralympics in Rio, Davies took part in his third IPC World Championships, the 2015 Games in Doha. Both his favoured events, the discus and the shot put, were contested in the F42 category but after undergoing a hernia operation just ten weeks before Davies was unsure of his form going into the competition. Davies' F42 shot put event opened the Championship and although by his own admission he believed his early throws were below his best, his second round throw of 14.35 was good enough to put him into second place and saw him progress to the latter rounds. In the finals Davies abandoned technique for power and threw a 14.88 and then a Championship record of 14.95 to secure the gold medal. In the discus Davies was dominant, breaking his own world record on three occasions on his way to a second gold, his best distance being 49.59m. Davies ended the year by being shortlisted for the 2015 BBC Wales Sports Personality of the Year.

The next year Davies competed at his second European Championship, held during June in Grosseto. He went into the games on strong form, having extended his own world record (16.13m) in the shot put at Tempe, Arizona the month before. The shot put was held on the second day of the tournament, with Davies throwing two centimetres short of his new record with a distance of 16.11m to take the gold medal. He followed this on day four with a dominant display in the discus to take gold and retain both his European titles. His winning throw of 54.14 added almost five metres onto his world record set in Doha eight months prior.

In the Rio Paralympics, Davies won a gold medal in the F42 shot put, beating his nearest rivals by over a metre with a new Paralympic record of 15.97m.

=== 2020 Tokyo Paralympics ===
At the 2020 Summer Paralympics in Tokyo, Japan, he won the gold medal in the men's shot put F63 event.

Davies was appointed Officer of the Order of the British Empire (OBE) in the 2022 New Year Honours for services to athletics.

2022 Commonwealth Games

At the 2022 Commonwealth Games Aled won gold in the F42-44/F61-64 Discus throw.

2023 World Para Athletics Championships

At the 2023 World Para Athletics Championships Davies won gold in the F63 Shot put.

2024 World Para Athletics Championships

The following year, at the 2024 World Para Athletics Championships, Davies won his sixth consecutive F63 shot put title.

=== 2024 Paris Paralympics ===
Davies was selected to represent Great Britain at the 2024 Summer Paralympics, in the T63 shot put. He won a silver medal behind Faisal Sorour.

== See also ==
- 2012 Summer Olympics and Paralympics gold post boxes
