= Guo Chunliang =

Chinese Paralympic javelin thrower

Personal information
- Born: 23 August 1985 (age 40)

Sport
- Country: China
- Sport: Para-athletics
- Disability class: F46
- Event: Javelin throw
Medal record
Men's para-athletics
Representing China
Paralympic Games
Silver medal – second place	2016 Rio de Janeiro	Javelin throw F46
World Championships
Gold medal – first place	2011 Christchurch	Javelin throw F46
Gold medal – first place	2015 Doha	Javelin throw F46
Silver medal – second place	2011 Christchurch	Discus throw F46
Bronze medal – third place	2017 London	Javelin throw F46
Asian Para Games
Gold medal – first place	2014 Incheon	Javelin throw F46
Silver medal – second place	2014 Incheon	Discus throw F46

Guo Chunliang (born 23 August 1985) is a Chinese Paralympic javelin thrower. He won the silver medal in the men's javelin throw F46 event at the 2016 Summer Paralympics in Rio de Janeiro, Brazil.

At the 2015 IPC Athletics World Championships held in Doha, Qatar he won the gold medal in the men's javelin throw F46 event.

At the 2017 World Para Athletics Championships held in London, United Kingdom he won the bronze medal in the men's javelin throw F46 event.
