= Miloš Zarić =

Serbian Paralympic athlete

Personal information
- Nationality: Serbian
- Born: Miloš Zarić; 4 December 1987 (age 38) Užice

Sport
- Sport: Athletics
- Event: Discus Throw Javelin Throw Shot Put
- Club: AK "Pora" Užice
Medal record
Representing Serbia
Men's Athletics
IPC Athletics World Championships
Silver medal – second place	2015 Doha	Javelin Throw - F55
Silver medal – second place	2015 Doha	Shot Put - F55
Gold medal – first place	2017 London	Javelin Throw - F55
IPC Athletics European Championships
Silver medal – second place	2014 Swansea	Javelin Throw - F56
Gold medal – first place	2016 Grosseto	Javelin Throw - F55
Gold medal – first place	2018 Berlin	Javelin Throw - F55

Miloš Zarić (Serbian Cyrillic: Милош Зарић; born 4 December 1987 in Užice) is a Serbian athlete who competed for his nation in the Shot Put at the 2016 Summer Paralympics.

Miloš became the first Serbian athlete to compete at both the summer and winter Paralympic Games, following his appearances at the 2016 Summer Paralympics in Rio de Janeiro and the 2018 Winter Paralympics in Pyeongchang. He also became the first Serbian athlete to compete in Para cross-country skiing at the Paralympic Winter Games. "I am extremely happy that I am the first. No one has competed at the Winter and Summer Games before me. Now, I'm going to compete at the Paralympic Games every two years. It's unbelievable feeling.
