= Mohsen Kaedi =

Iranian Paralympic athlete

Personal information
- Nationality: Iranian
- Born: 19 April 1987 (age 39) Khorramabad, Iran

Sport
- Sport: Athletics
- Events: javelin, shot put
- Coached by: Dr. Mostafa Bahrami; Bahman Rezaei
Medal record
Track and field (F34)
Representing Iran
Paralympic Games
Gold medal – first place	2012 London	Javelin throw – F33–34
Silver medal – second place	2012 London	Shot put – F34
Bronze medal – third place	2016 Rio de Janeiro	Javelin throw– F34
Bronze medal – third place	2016 Rio de Janeiro	Shot put – F34
IPC World Championships
Gold medal – first place	2013 Lyon	Javelin throw – F34
Silver medal – second place	2015 Doha	Shot put – F34
Silver medal – second place	2017 London	Javelin throw – F34
Silver medal – second place	2017 London	Shot put – F34
Bronze medal – third place	2013 Lyon	Shot Put – F34
Bronze medal – third place	2015 Doha	Javelin throw – F34
Asian Para Games
Silver medal – second place	2010 Guangzhou	Javelin throw – F35–36
Silver medal – second place	2014 Incheon	Javelin throw – F33–34
Silver medal – second place	2018 Jakarta	Javelin throw – F33–34
Bronze medal – third place	2014 Incheon	Shot put – F34

Mohsen Kaedi (born 19 April 1987) is a para-athlete from Iran competing mainly in category F34 throwing events. He has competed at two Summer Paralympics, winning a gold medal in the F33–34 javelin at the 2012 Games in London.

== Career history ==
Kaedi took up throwing events in 2004, whilst still living in Khorramabad. Kaedi, who has cerebral palsy, was classified as a F35 field athlete allowing him to compete in IPC sanctioned events. He made his senior international debut for Iran at the 2006 IPC Athletics World Championships held in Assen in the Netherlands. There he entered the F35 discus, finishing fourth with a distance of 41.55m.

Two years later Kaedi qualified for his first Summer Paralympics, travelling to China to compete in the 2008 Games at Beijing in the javelin. His best throw in the F35/36 javelin was 42.61m, converted to 975 points, which left him in fifth place. His first major international success came at the inaugural 2010 Asian Para Games, where he took silver in the F35/36 javelin.

Kaedi's next major tournament was the 2012 Summer Paralympics held in London. By now he had been reclassified and was competing in the F34 classification for athletes with a more severe impairment. He entered both the F34 shot put and the F33–34 javelin, winning silver in the shot put and gold in the javelin.
