= Virender =

Virender is a given name. Notable people with the name include:

- Virender Lal Chopra (1936–2020), Indian biotechnologist, geneticist, agriculturalist, director-general of ICAR
- Virender Dahiya, Haryana cricketer
- Virender Dev Dixit, former Brahma Kumari adherent who established the Adhyatmik Ishwariya Vishwa Vidyalaya
- Virender Singh Kadian, Indian lawyer and politician
- Virender Kanwar, Indian politician
- Virender Kashyap, Indian politician
- Virender Sangwan (born 1964), Indian ophthalmologist, professor
- Virender Sehwag (born 1978), former Indian cricketer
- Virender Sharma (born 1971), Indian former cricketer
- Choudhary Virender Singh, Indian politician
- Virender Singh (judge) (born 1954), Indian Judge and former Chief Justice of High Court of Jharkhand High Court
- Virender Singh (Thakran) (born 1970), former Indian wrestler
- Virender Singh (Deaf Wrestler) (born 1986), Indian freestyle wrestler

== See also ==
- Varendra
- Veerendra
- Virendra
