= Aliaksandr Tryputs =

Belarusian Paralympic athlete

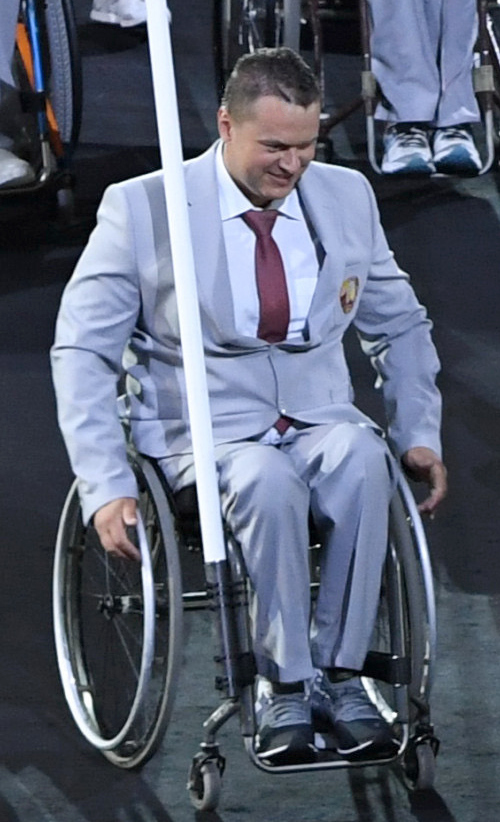
- Tryputs at the 2016 Paralympics

Personal information
- Born: 21 May 1982 (age 44) Grodno, Byelorussian SSR, Soviet Union
- Height: 1.80 m (5 ft 11 in)
- Weight: 96 kg (212 lb)

Sport
- Sport: Paralympic athletics
- Disability class: F12, F54
- Event(s): Javelin throw, pentathlon
- Coached by: Valery Orlov (2006–2013); Sergey Gribanov (2013–2017); Aliaksandr Barkun (2017–)
Medal record
Representing Belarus
Paralympic Games
Silver medal – second place	2000 Sydney	Javelin F12
Gold medal – first place	2004 Athens	Javelin F12
Silver medal – second place	2004 Athens	Pentathlon P13
Bronze medal – third place	2016 Rio	Javelin F53/54
IPC Athletics European Championships
Bronze medal – third place	2016 Grosseto	Javelin F54
Gold medal – first place	2018 Berlin	Javelin F54

Aliaksandr Tryputs (Belarusian: Аляксандр Часлававіч Трыпуць; born 21 May 1982, in Grodno) is a wheelchair athlete from Belarus who specializes in throwing events and pentathlon.

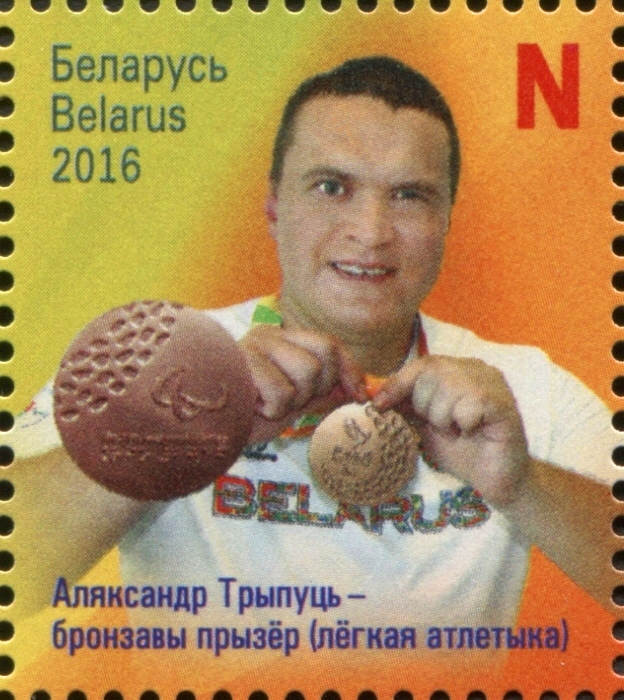
Tryputs on a 2016 stamp of Belarus

== Career ==
Tryputs took up athletics in 1994 in Grodno.

He competed at the 2000, 2004, 2008 and 2016 Paralympics and won four medals: a gold, a silver and a bronze in the javelin throw (2004, 2000 and 2016, respectively) and a silver in the pentathlon in 2004. He placed fourth in the pentathlon in 2000 and fifth in the javelin in 2008. He served as the flag bearer for Belarus at the 2016 Summer Paralympics Parade of Nations.
