= Rory McSweeney =

New Zealand para-athlete

Personal information
- Born: 20 April 1985 (age 41) Wellington, New Zealand

Sport
- Country: New Zealand
- Sport: Athletics
- Disability class: F44
- Club: Athletics Taieri

Achievements and titles
- Personal best: Javelin F44: 55.80 m (2015, NR)
Medal record
Men's para athletics
Representing New Zealand
Summer Paralympics
Bronze medal – third place	2016 Rio de Janeiro	Javelin F44
World Championships
Silver medal – second place	2015 Doha	Javelin F44

Rory McSweeney (born 20 April 1985) is a New Zealand para-athlete, primarily competing in the javelin throw. He represented New Zealand at the 2016 Summer Paralympics in Rio de Janeiro, where he won the bronze medal in the men's javelin throw T44.

== Statistics ==
=== Javelin throw progression ===
Year	Performance	Competition	Location	Date	World ranking
2012	46.89 m	Club meeting	Dunedin, New Zealand	3 November	
2013	49.95 m	IPC Athletics World Championships	Lyon, France	24 July	
2014	48.03 m	Club meeting	Dunedin, New Zealand	1 November	
2015	55.80 m	IPC Athletics World Championships	Doha, Qatar	30 October	
2016	55.46 m	New Zealand National Championships	Dunedin, New Zealand	6 March	

== Early life and amputation ==
At three years old, Rory was struck by a truck, resulting in the amputation of his leg below the knee. He has described this early life challenge as a formative experience that later influenced his decision to pursue athletics at an elite level.
