= Reinhardt Hamman =

South African Paralympic athlete

Personal information
- Nationality: South African
- Born: 20 February 1990 (age 36) Cape Town, South Africa
- Height: 181 cm (71 in)

Sport
- Country: South Africa
- Sport: Athletics
- Disability class: F38
- Event(s): shot put javelin throw discus throw
- Coached by: (Daniel Damon (javelin)
Medal record
Paralympic athletics
Representing South Africa
Paralympic Games
Gold medal – first place	2016 Rio de Janeiro	Javellin throw - F38
IPC Athletics World Championships
Gold medal – first place	2013 Lyon	Javelin F37/38
Gold medal – first place	2015 Doha	Javelin F38
Silver medal – second place	2015 Doha	Shot put F38

Reinhardt Hamman (born 20 February 1990) is a Paralympian Track and field athlete from South Africa competing mainly in category F38 throwing events.

== Athletics career ==
Hamman took up athletics at the age of 13 at Vista Nova Primary School in Rondebosch. In 2009 he quit the sport following his disappointment at not qualifying for the 2008 Summer Paralympics in Beijing. He returned to the sport in 2013, and was selected for the South African team o compete at the 2013 IPC Athletics World Championships in Lyon. He took part in the javelin throw and shot put, finishing fifth in the shot, but threw a distance of 45.72 metres in the javelin to take the gold medal. Two years later he competed at the 2015 World Championships in Doha, winning gold in the javelin and silver in the shot put.

== Personal history ==
Hamman was born in Cape Town, South Africa in 1990. He has cerebral palsy.
