= Virender Dev Dixit =

Indian Hindu religious leader

Virender Dev Dixit is a former Brahma Kumari adherent who went on to establish the Adhyatmik Ishwariya Vishwa Vidyalaya or "the Advance Party" while claiming, on the basis of the Brahma Kumari teachings, to be the current spirit medium for their god, and founder Lekhraj Kirpalani.

Brahma Kumari University released this official statement:

"The Brahma Kumaris organization is not responsible for the acts and conduct including any illegal activities of Virender Dev Dixit and his organization 'Adhyatmik Vishwavidalaya' or its members in the past, present or future. The claims of the members of that organization to be part of the Brahma Kumaris or calling them as Brahma Kumaris is without our permission and not endorsed by us."
