= Slobodan Miletić =

Norwegian footballer

Personal information
- Date of birth: 19 August 1969 (age 57)
- Place of birth: Niš, FR Yugoslavia
- Position: Midfielder

Senior career*
Years	Team	Apps	(Gls)
1989–1990	Partizan	4	(0)
1990–1991	Radnički Niš	30	(2)
1991–1992	Partizan	22	(2)
1992–1994	Borac Banja Luka		
1994	Radnički Niš	15	(2)
1995	Start	15	(3)
1996	Larissa	9	(0)
1996-1997	OFK Beograd		
1997–2000	RWDM		
2000	Panetolikos		
2000–2001	Kozani		
- * Club domestic league appearances and goals

Slobodan Miletić (born 19 August 1969) is a retired Serbian football midfielder.

In November 1997, Miletić scored RWDM's 1000th goal away against AA Gent.
