= Nemanja Dimitrijević =

Serbian Paralympic athlete (born 1992)

Personal information
- Nationality: Serbian
- Born: Nemanja Dimitrijević; 7 February 1992 (age 34) Belgrade

Sport
- Sport: Athletics
- Event: Javelin Throw
- Club: AK Pogled Belgrade

Achievements and titles
- Personal best: 60.86
Medal record
Representing Serbia
Men's Athletics
Paralympic Games
Bronze medal – third place	2016 Rio de Janeiro	Javelin Throw F13
IPC Athletics World Championships
Bronze medal – third place	2015 Doha	Javelin Throw F13
IPC Athletics European Championships
Bronze medal – third place	2016 Grosseto	Javelin Throw F13

Nemanja Dimitrijević (Serbian Cyrillic: Немања Димитријевић), (born February 7, 1992, in Belgrad) is a Paralympian athlete from Serbia. He competes in Javelin Throw in the F13, T13 classification. At the 2016 Summer Paralympics held in Rio, he won a bronze medal in athletics.
