= Tony Falelavaki =

French Paralympic athlete

Personal information
- Born: 21 November 1985 (age 40) Wallis and Futuna
- Height: 177 cm (70 in)

Sport
- Country: France
- Sport: Athletics
- Disability class: F44
- Event(s): shot put discus throw javelin throw
- Club: Club Kafika Handisport de Wallis
- Coached by: Pelenato Lakalaka; Frank Foucat
Medal record
Track and field
Representing France
Paralympic Games
Silver medal – second place	2012 London	Javelin - F44
IPC World Championships
Gold medal – first place	2013 Lyon	Javelin - F44
Pacific Mini Games
Gold medal – first place	2012 Mata-Utu	Javelin - Parasport

Tony Falelavaki (born 21 November 1985) is a Paralympian athlete from France competing mainly in F44 classification throwing events.

== Athletics history ==
Falelavaki first represented France at the 2008 Summer Paralympics in Beijing, entering the shot put and javelin throw events (F44). In the shot he finished eighth, and in the javelin eleventh. Four years later he took part in the 2012 Paralympics in London, this time with his focus solely on the javelin. His third round throw of 58.21 set a new European record and gave Falelavaki the silver medal.

As well as his Paralympic success Falelavki has also qualified for three IPC Athletics World Championships. His most successful World Championship was in 2013 in Lyon where he won gold in the men's javelin F44. He was also selected to light the cauldron to start the 2013 Pacific Mini Games, set in his home island of Wallis and Futuna.

== Personal history ==
Falelavaki was born on the South Pacific island of Wallis and Futuna in 1985. He was born with congenital talipes equinovarus.
