= Hossain Rasouli =

Afghan athlete

Personal information
- Nationality: Afghanistan
- Born: 10 August 1995 (age 30) Afghanistan

Sport
- Country: (Islamic Republic of Afghanistan) Afghanistan, Islamic Republic of
- Sport: Athletics

Hossain Rasouli (Pashto: حسین رسولي; born 10 August 1995) is an Afghan Paralympic athlete. He represented Afghanistan at the 2020 Summer Paralympics. He was initially denied the opportunity to compete at his first Paralympics due to the Taliban takeover but he was later allowed by the International Paralympic Committee to compete at the event after being safely evacuated from Afghanistan. His left arm was amputated due to a landmine explosion.

== Career ==
He was chosen as one of the two competitors from Afghanistan alongside parataekwondo practitioner Zakia Khudadadi for the 2020 Summer Paralympics. However, on 16 August 2021, Afghanistan was forced to withdraw from the event following the Fall of Kabul to the Taliban. Afghan athletes were also unable to leave Kabul due to the closure of the airports. Both of them were absent during the 2020 Summer Paralympics opening ceremony although the Flag of Afghanistan was waived during the opening ceremony in solidarity with the people of Afghanistan.

On 28 August 2021, Rasouli, alongside his female compatriot Khudadadi, arrived in Tokyo after taking a flight en route from Kabul to Paris, ending the uncertainties which prevailed regarding Afghanistan's participation at the Tokyo Paralympics. The President of International Paralympic Committee, Andrew Parsons revealed that both of the Afghan athletes would not be available for interviews and that permission has been granted to them to skip the usual press conferences.

Hossain was initially scheduled to compete in the men's 100m T47 event on 28 August 2021 but had to miss the event due to his late arrival in Tokyo. However, he was allowed to compete in the men's long jump T47 final on 31 August 2021, even though his name was not originally in the final list. He finished at thirteenth and last position in the men's long jump final but recorded his personal best performance of 4.46m. It was also Rasouli's first long jump event in a major international competition.
