= Kyron Duke =

Welsh Paralympic athlete

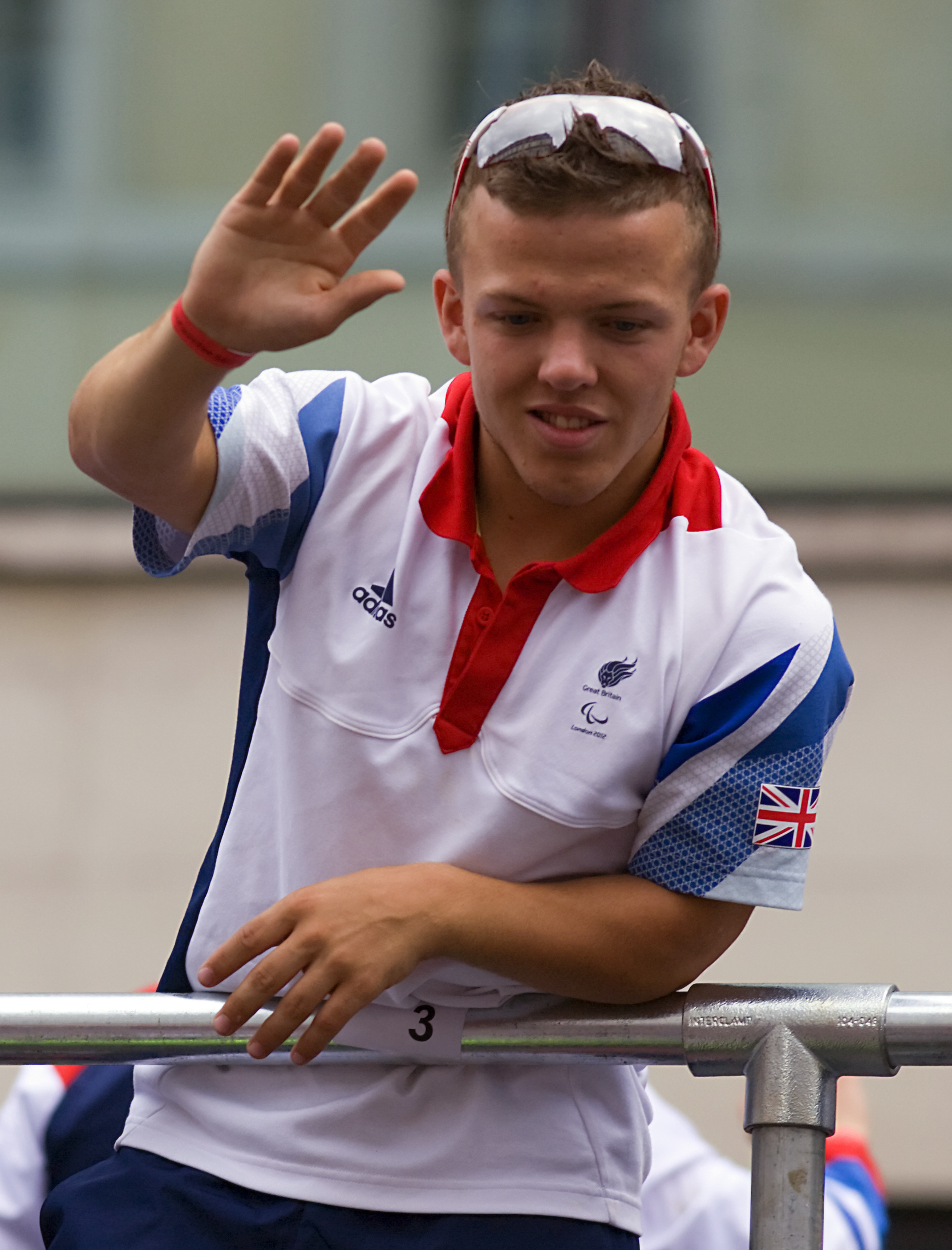
- Duke in 2012

Personal information
- Nationality: British
- Born: 12 October 1992 (age 34) Newport, Wales
- Height: 140 cm (4 ft 7 in)

Sport
- Country: Wales, UK
- Sport: Powerlifting, Athletics
- Events: EAD powerlift F41 Shot put F41 Javelin
- Club: Federation of Disability Sport Wales
- Coached by: Anthony Hughes

Achievements and titles
- Paralympic finals: 2012
- Personal bests: Shot Put: 14.19m Javelin: 38.64m
Medal record
Men's Paralympic athletics
Representing Great Britain
World Championships
Silver medal – second place	2013 Lyon	Javelin – F41
Silver medal – second place	2017 London	Shot put – F41
Bronze medal – third place	2011 Christchurch	F40 – javelin
Bronze medal – third place	2013 Lyon	Shot put – F41
Bronze medal – third place	2015 Doha	Javelin Throw – F41
European Championships
Silver medal – second place	2014 Swansea	Javelin F41
Silver medal – second place	2014 Swansea	Shot put F41

Kyron Duke (born 12 October 1992) is a Welsh powerlifter and Paralympian track and field athlete competing in category F41 throwing events. Duke has represented Wales in the 2010 Commonwealth Games in powerlifting. In 2012 he qualified for the 2012 Summer Paralympics in javelin and shot put.

== History ==
Duke was born in Newport, south Wales in 1992, but now lives in Pontnewydd near Cwmbran. He was born with achondroplasia a form of dwarfism. His older cousin Gareth Duke also has the same condition and represented Great Britain as a swimmer in the 2004 and 2008 Olympic Games, winning gold, silver and bronze medals.

Duke took up powerlifting at the age of 12 and became junior champion at the para-sport in October 2009. He represented Wales at the 2010 Commonwealth Games in the EAD (Elite athletes with a disability) category benchpress.

In 2009, along with his powerlifting, Duke began entering para sport athletic events. He competed in both the F40 shot put and javelin at the CP Sport Grand Prix in Nottingham and the Czech Open. In 2010 as well as the Nottingham Grand Prix, Duke also entered the Berlin Open. In Berlin he finished fourth in the discus and shot put and first in the javelin, equalling his personal best of 29.53m. In 2011 Duke took gold medal in the javelin at the IWAS World Junior Championships held in Dubai, and recorded a personal best in the javelin of 33.38m at the Czech Open. 2011 also saw Duke qualified for the IPC Athletics World Championships at the men's F40 – javelin. His throw of 32.64 earned him the bronze medal.

In 2011 Duke took part in a documentary for Channel 4 in the UK, as part of the Best of British series. He, along with athlete Sean Clare, took part in the programme which attempted to challenge preconceptions associated with their stature.

Duke recorded his personal best in both shot put (11.19m) and javelin (37.39) at the Welsh Championships in Cardiff on 2 June 2012. In 2013 Duke qualified for the shot put as part of the British team for the 2013 IPC Athletics World Championships in Lyon, France. Duke took the bronze in the F41 shot.
