= Adhyatmik Ishwariya Vishwa Vidyalaya =

Religious organisation in India

The Adhyatmik Ishwariya Vishwa Vidyalaya (Hindi, translates as "Spiritual Godly University". Devanagari: आध्यात्मिक ईश्वरीय विश्वविद्यालय) is a reformative splinter group within the Brahma Kumaris religious movement.

Followers of the Adhyatmik Ishwariya Vishwa Vidyalaya (AIVV) refer to themselves as the Prajapita Brahma Kumaris (PBKs) or Advance Party. The AIVV sees itself and the Brahma Kumaris Organization as two halves of the same spiritual family who will eventually re-unite to transform this world from hell into heaven, although the BKWSU does not share the same belief.

The organisation is based in Kampil, Uttar Pradesh, India

== Beliefs ==
Central to the PBKs' beliefs is that at the beginning of the movement, there was a different medium, Dada Lekhraj's business partner, who died in 1942, reincarnated as the AIVV's leader Virender Dev Dixit and has, since Lekhraj Kripalani's death, become once again the authoritative medium of God through whom he speaks clarifying the earlier teachings.

The PBKs accuse the BKWSU's hierarchy of "censoring or altering" the spiritualistic messages called "Murlis". They consider that the Brahma Kumaris misinterpret and misunderstood their predictions. PBKs refer to the Brahma Kumaris' teachings as ‘Basic Knowledge’ and message presented by Shiva through Dixit as the ‘Advance[d] knowledge’.

The PBKs claim that God is now manifesting himself through a different medium to correctly interpret the original teachings and reject the Brahma Kumaris belief that God and their deceased founder Dada Lekhraj is being channelled via an elderly woman called Hiradaya Mohini or "Dadi Gulzar".

Shivbaba narrated Gyan Murlis (flute of knowledge) through Brahma Baba and is now giving the advanced knowledge i.e. He is clarifying the true meaning (the true Gita) of those murlis, to the AIVV Prajapita Brahma Kumar/Kumaris (i.e. Advance Party or AIVV).

== Membership ==
The group is made up of predominantly disaffected ex-members of the BKWSU University, some of whom had conflict with the BKWSU's local representative.

Walliss identifies the Advance Party as radically re-interpreting the millenarianism of the BKSWU to regain its "true" original form. As a result, they set a specific date of 2008 as that expected for the destruction of the world and the emergence of the millennial kingdom in 2036.

== BKWSU use of term ==
Within the Brahma Kumaris movement, the term "Advance Party" is also used for the group of deceased Brahma Kumaris followers who they claim reincarnate back into the world at this time in order to physically prepare the paradisical heaven on earth, called the Golden Age.

The breakaway group's use of the name is seen within the BKWSU as impertinent and they therefore refer to them as the 'Shankar Party'.

== Criminal allegations ==
In December 2017, Indian police raided the group's ashrams to free hundreds of female followers said to be being kept in terrible conditions. 250 women and 48 girls were released many of whom, it was alleged by Swati Maliwal the city's commissioner for women, appeared to be drugged. According to a lawsuit lodged at Delhi's High Court, the leader of the group Virendra Dev Dixit had sexually assaulted multiple women and keeps residents confined in conditions "worse than farm animals".

== See also ==
- Channeling (mediumistic)
- End times
- Meditation
- New religious movement
