= Alister McQueen =

Canadian Paralympic athlete

Medal record

Men's paralympic athletics

Representing Canada

Paralympic Games
Silver medal – second place	2016 Rio de Janeiro	Javelin throw F44

Parapan American Games
Bronze medal – third place	2011 Guadalajara	200m T44
Bronze medal – third place	2011 Guadalajara	Javelin throw F44

Alister McQueen (born 19 June 1991) is a Canadian athlete who competes in T44 classification track and field events. He was born with only one bone in his left lower leg, and his foot was amputated so he could wear a prosthesis. He is active in several sports.

McQueen won bronze medals at the 2011 Parapan American Games in the 200m event and the javelin throw and qualified to compete in the 2012 Paralympic Games.

== See also ==
- The Mechanics of Running Blades
