= Wang Yanzhang (athlete) =

Chinese Paralympic athlete

Personal information
- Born: 31 May 1991 (age 35) Shanghai, China
- Height: 188 cm (74 in)

Sport
- Country: China
- Sport: Athletics
- Disability: Cerebral palsy
- Disability class: F34
- Event(s): shot put discus throw javelin throw
- Club: Shanghai
- Coached by: Wang Xingzhang
Medal record
Track and field
Representing China
Paralympic Games
Gold medal – first place	2012 London	Discus – F32/33/34
Silver medal – second place	2012 London	Javelin – F33/34
World Championships
Gold medal – first place	2015 Doha	Javelin – F34
Gold medal – first place	2015 Doha	discus – F34
Gold medal – first place	2017 London	Discus throw – F34
Silver medal – second place	2013 Lyon	Javelin – F33/34
Silver medal – second place	2013 Lyon	discus – F32/33/34
Asian Para Games
Gold medal – first place	2014 Guan	Discus – F34
Gold medal – first place	2014 Incheon	Javelin – F33/4

Wang Yanzhang (born 31 May 1991) is a Paralympian athlete from China competing mainly in F34 classification throwing events.

== Athletics career ==
Wang represented China at the 2012 Summer Paralympics in London, entering the shot put, javelin throw and discus throw events. He finished eighth in the shot put, but finished on the podium in both the javelin and discus, winning silver and gold respectively. As well as his Paralympic success Wang has won medals at the World Championships winning two silvers at the 2013 Games in Lyon, and in the 2015 Games in Doha he won gold in both the javelin and discus.

== Personal history ==
Wang was born in Shanghai, China in 1991. He has cerebral palsy.
