= Helgi Sveinsson =

Icelandic Paralympic athlete

Personal information
- Nationality: Icelandic
- Born: 11 June 1979 (age 47) Reykjavík, Iceland

Sport
- Country: Iceland
- Sport: Athletics
- Events: Javelin; Long jump Sprint

Achievements and titles
- Paralympic finals: 2012; 2016
Medal record
Track and field (athletics)
Representing Iceland
IPC World Championships
Gold medal – first place	2013 Lyon	Javelin – F42
Bronze medal – third place	2015 Doha	Javelin – F44
IPC European Championships
Gold medal – first place	2014 Swansea	Javelin F42
Gold medal – first place	2016 Grosseto	Javelin F44
Silver medal – second place	2012 Stadskanaal	Javelin – F42

Helgi Sveinsson (born 11 June 1979) is a Paralympian athlete from Iceland competing in throwing, sprint and jumping events. He is a F42/T42 category athlete. At the 2013 IPC Athletics World Championships he threw a competition record to take the gold medal.

== Sport career ==
Sveinsson was born in Reykjavík in 1979. A keen sportsman, he played handball at a semi-professional level for several Icelandic clubs. His sporting career was halted when he was diagnosed with bone cancer. At the age of 20, in an attempt to combat the disease his left leg was amputated above the knee. In 2010 he was introduced to Paralympic sport, and in 2011 took on a coach. His natural athletic ability allowed Sveinsson to compete in multiple fields, competing in the long jump, sprint and javelin throw. In his first international competition, the 2012 IPC European Championships in the Netherlands, he took silver in the javelin. At the same Championships he also finished third in the 200m, but did not medal due to the low level of athletes competing in the event.

In 2012 Sveinsson was one of four competitors to represent Iceland at the 2012 Summer Paralympics. Sveinsson qualified in all three of his fields, and competed in the javelin, long jump and 100m sprint. He was also given the honour of being flag bearer for his country at the opening ceremony. In the long jump he was entered into the F42–44 category, but his first round best of 4.25m was not good enough to see him progress through to the final rounds. In the 100m T42 heats, Sveinsson recorded a time of 15.64s, a time way below his personal best and finished in 5th place, failing to qualify for the final round. In the F42 javelin, he threw a personal best of 47.61m in the opening round to progress to the final eight. He failed to better his early throw and finished fifth, just over a metre outside the medal positions.

After the 2012 Paralympics Sveinsson was reselected for Iceland when he made the squad for the 2013 IPC Athletics World Championships held in Lyon, France. At the World Championships, he only entered the javelin throw and was faced with a strong field including Paralympic medalists Fu Yanlong of China and Runar Steinstad of Norway. Sveinsson threw a distance of 50.9m, a new Championship record, to win the gold medal.
