= Andrius Skuja =

Lithuanian Paralympic athlete

Personal information
- Born: 9 August 1992 (age 33) Kuršėnai, Šiauliai district, Lithuania
- Height: 2.03 m (6 ft 8 in)

Sport
- Country: Lithuania
- Sport: Paralympic athletics
- Disability: Plexopathy
- Disability class: F46
- Event(s): Javelin throw Shot put
Medal record
Paralympic athletics
Representing Lithuania
European Championships
Gold medal – first place	2016 Grosseto	Shot put F46
Gold medal – first place	2018 Berlin	Javelin throw F46
Gold medal – first place	2020 Bydgoszcz	Javelin throw F46
Silver medal – second place	2020 Bydgoszcz	Shot put F46
Bronze medal – third place	2016 Grosseto	Javelin throw F46
Bronze medal – third place	2018 Berlin	Shot put F46

Andrius Skuja (born 9 August 1992) is a Lithuanian Paralympic athlete who competes in javelin throw and shot put events at international track and field competitions. He is a triple European champion and has competed at the 2020 Summer Paralympics. He was born with plexopathy in his right shoulder following complications at birth.
