= Mathias Mester =

German Paralympic athlete

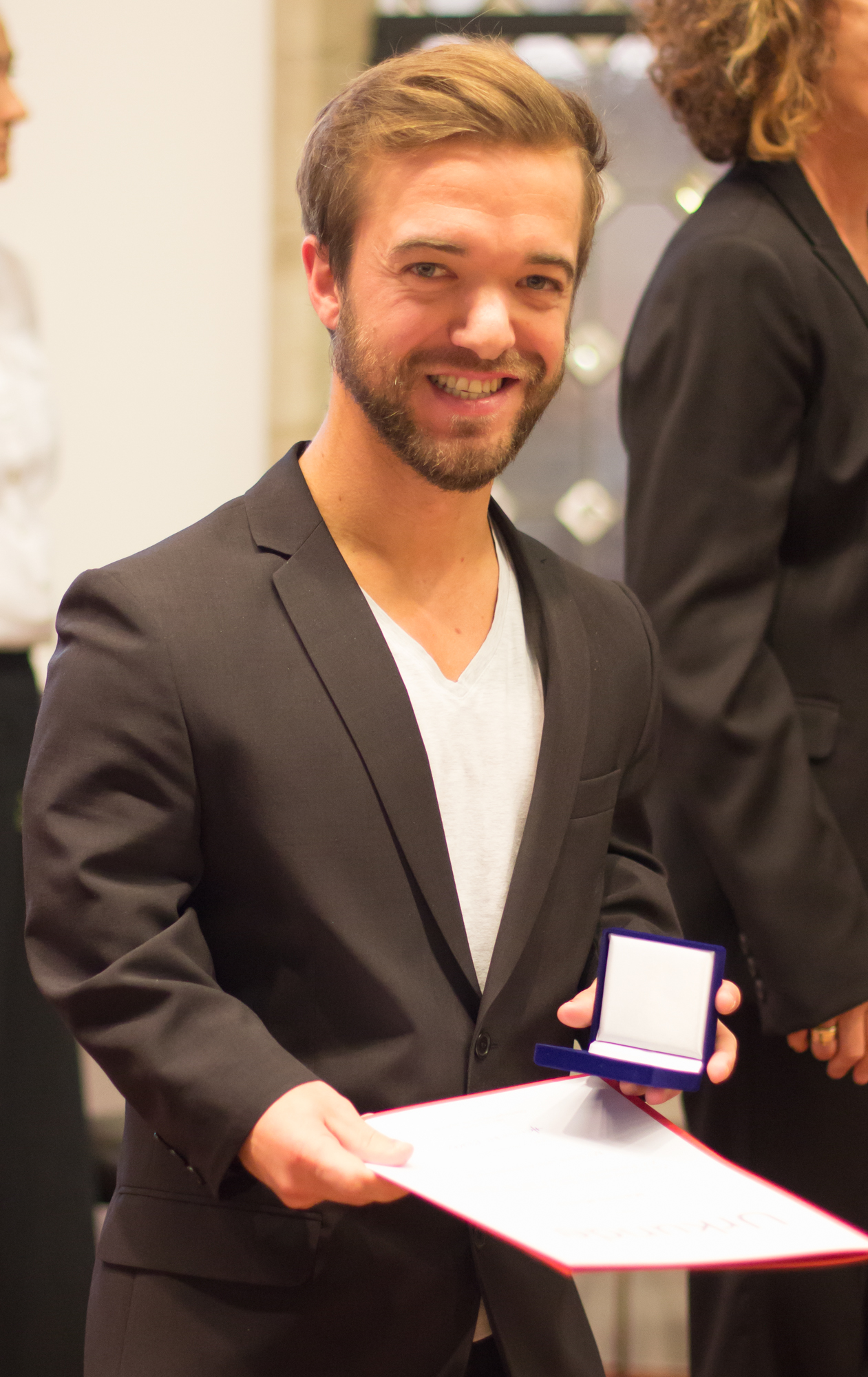
- Mester in 2016

Medal record

Men's para-athletics

Representing Germany

Paralympic Games
Silver medal – second place	2008 Beijing	Shot put F40

IPC World Championships
Gold medal – first place	2013 Lyon	Javelin F41

IPC European Championships
Gold medal – first place	2012 Stadskanaal	Javelin F40
Gold medal – first place	2014 Swansea	Javelin F41
Silver medal – second place	2016 Grosseto	Javelin F40/41

Mathias Mester (born 15 September 1986 in Coesfeld) is a Paralympian athlete from Germany competing mainly in category F40 throwing events.

In 2007 the German Disabled Sports Association recognised his achievement and he and cyclist Natalie Simanowski were the Disabled Athletes of the Year.

He competed in the 2008 Summer Paralympics in Beijing, China. There he won a silver medal in the men's F40 shot put event.
