= Héctor Cabrera =

Spanish Paralympic athlete (born 1994)

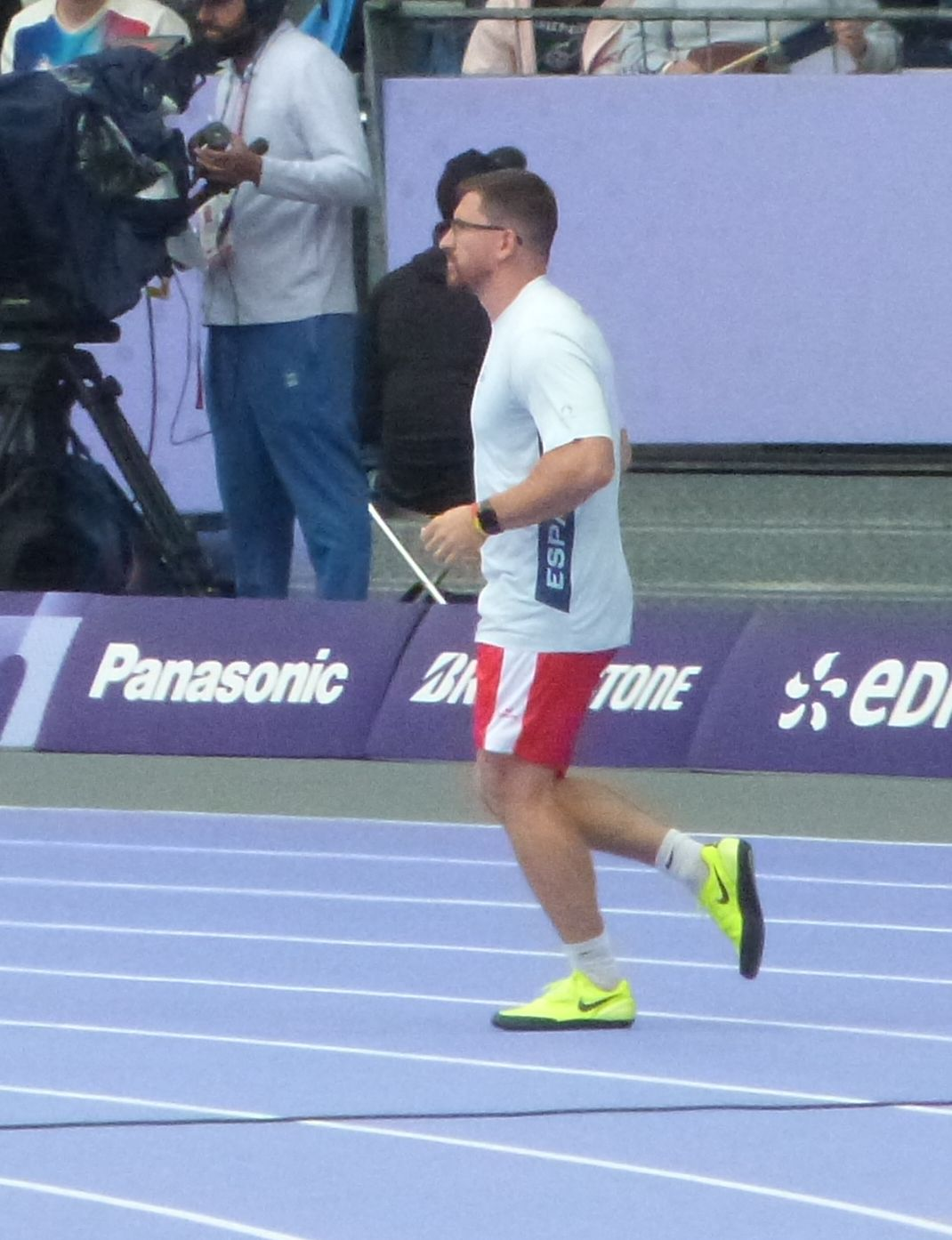

Personal information
- Full name: Héctor Cabrera Llácer
- Born: 9 March 1994 (age 32) Valencia, Spain
- Height: 1.80 m (5 ft 11 in)

Sport
- Country: Spain
- Sport: Paralympic athletics
- Disability: Stargardt disease
- Disability class: T12
Medal record
Paralympic athletics
Representing Spain
Paralympic Games
| Bronze medal – third place | 2020 Tokyo | Javelin throw F13 |
World Championships
| Silver medal – second place | 2019 Dubai | Javelin throw F13 |
| Bronze medal – third place | 2017 London | Javelin throw F13 |
| Bronze medal – third place | 2025 New Delhi | Javelin throw F13 |
European Championships
| Gold medal – first place | 2014 Swansea | Javelin throw F12 |
| Gold medal – first place | 2018 Berlin | Javelin throw F12 |
| Silver medal – second place | 2016 Grosseto | Javelin throw F13 |
| Bronze medal – third place | 2016 Grosseto | Discus throw F12 |

Héctor Cabrera Llácer (Note: In this Spanish name, the first or paternal surname is Cabrera and the second or maternal family name is Llácer.) (born 9 March 1994), also known as Héctor Cabrera, is a Spanish Paralympic athlete who competes in mainly javelin throw and shot put and occasionally discus throw at international elite events. He is a double World medalist and a double European champion. He took part in the 2016 Summer Paralympics in the javelin throw and shot put but did not medal in either event.

In 2019, he won the silver medal in the javelin throw at the 2019 World Para Athletics Championships and qualified to compete at the 2020 Summer Paralympics.
