= Dmitrijs Silovs =

Latvian Paralympic athlete

Personal information
- Born: 23 March 1989 (age 37) Krāslava, Latvian SSR, Soviet Union
- Height: 1.85 m (6 ft 1 in)

Sport
- Country: Latvia
- Sport: Paralympic athletics
- Disability: Cerebral palsy
- Disability class: F37
Medal record
Paralympic athletics
Representing Latvia
World Championships
Gold medal – first place	2017 London	Javelin throw F37
Silver medal – second place	2013 Lyon	Javelin throw F37
Silver medal – second place	2015 Doha	Shot put F37
European Championships
Gold medal – first place	2014 Swansea	Javelin throw F37/38
Gold medal – first place	2016 Grosseto	Javelin throw F37/38
Gold medal – first place	2018 Berlin	Javelin throw F38
Silver medal – second place	2016 Grosseto	Shot put F37

Dmitrijs Silovs (born 23 March 1989) is a Latvian Paralympic athlete who competes in international track and field competitions, he competes in javelin throw and shot put and was a former long jump. He is a World champion and three-time European champion in the javelin and has won two silver medals in the shot put. He competed at the 2012 Summer Paralympics in the long jump where he finished in ninth place.
