= T41 (classification) =

Para-athletics classification

T41 is disability sport classification for disability athletics. It is used in track athlete and has a sister classification F41 for field athletes. This is a classification for athletes with short stature.

== Sport ==
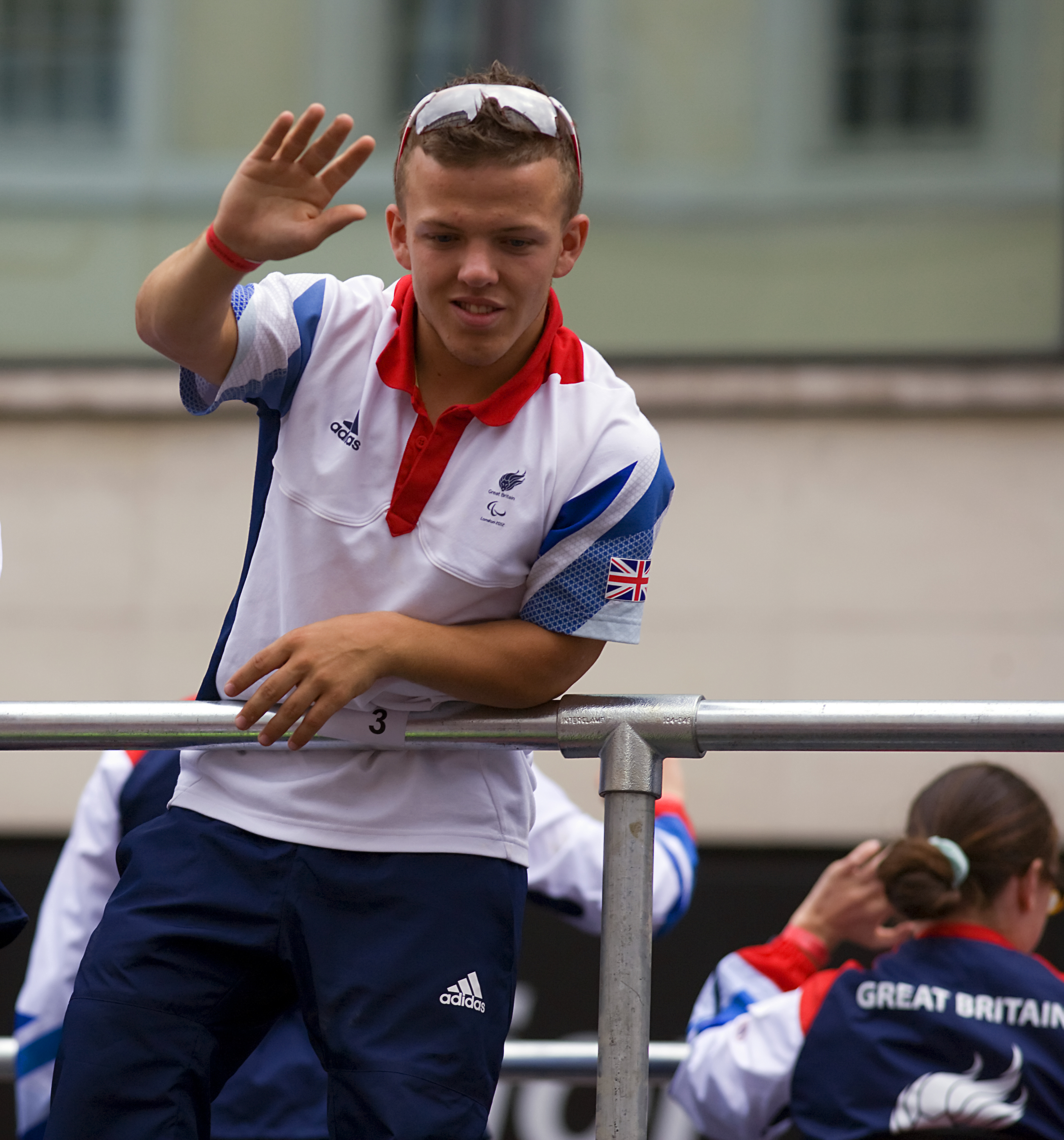
T41 competitor Kyron Duke

The T41 and F41 classification is for disability athletics. T41 do not currently challenge for any track events and none of the jumping events. The events presently open for T41 athletes are in the F41 shot put, javelin throw and discus throw.

The International Paralympic Committee defined this classification on their website in July 2016 as, "(Short stature)".

== Performance and rules ==
In relay events involving T40s classes, no baton is used. Instead, a handoff takes place via touch in the exchange zone.

== History ==
The classification was created by the International Paralympic Committee and has roots in a 2003 attempt to address "the overall objective to support and co-ordinate the ongoing development of accurate, reliable, consistent and credible sport focused classification systems and their implementation". T41 was created in 2013 as an additional classification to the T40 classification which covered competitors of short statue, primarily those with achondroplasia, or under a height of 140 cm for women or 145 cm (male). The T41 classification was added to divide the T40 category further, which would see the maximum height of T40 athletes set at 125 cm (female) and 130 cm (male) whilst the upper range for T41 athletes would retain the 140 cm and 145 cm limits.

In 2010, the IPC announced that they would release a new IPC Athletics Classification handbook that specifically dealt with physical impairments. This classification guide would be put into effect following the closing ceremony of the 2012 Summer Paralympics. One of these changes was creating a minimum age to compete in this class. Athletes needed to be at least 18 years old to compete. This was to prevent still growing children from competing in this class despite otherwise not having a disability.

For the 2016 Summer Paralympics in Rio, the International Paralympic Committee had a zero classification at the Games policy. This policy was put into place in 2014, with the goal of avoiding last minute changes in classes that would negatively impact athlete training preparations. All competitors needed to be internationally classified with their classification status confirmed prior to the Games, with exceptions to this policy being dealt with on a case-by-case basis. In case there was a need for classification or reclassification at the Games despite best efforts otherwise, athletics classification was scheduled for September 4 and September 5 at Olympic Stadium. For sportspeople with physical or intellectual disabilities going through classification or reclassification in Rio, their in competition observation event is their first appearance in competition at the Games.

== Becoming classified ==
Short-statured athletes seeking to compete in this class first need to have a classification evaluation. During this, they undergo a medical examination where their height and limbs are measured, and are asked to demonstrate skills in athletics such as running and throwing. A determination is then made as to what classification an athlete should compete in.

== Competitors ==
Notable competitors in this classification include Tunisian discus thrower and shot putter Raoua Tlili and British javelin thrower Kyron Duke.

== See also ==
- Para-athletics classification
- Athletics at the Summer Paralympics
