= 2011 IPC Athletics World Championships – Men's javelin throw =

The men's javelin throw at the 2011 IPC Athletics World Championships was held at the QEII Stadium from 22–29 January

== Medalists ==
Class	Gold	Silver	Bronze
F11	Bil Marinkovic; Austria	Anibal Bello; Venezuela	Duan Li; China
F13	Pengkai Zhu; China	Seyed Erfan Hosseini Liravi; Iran	Miloš Grlica; Serbia
F33/34	Thierry Cibone; France	Faouzi Rzig; Tunisia	Mohamed Ali Krid; Tunisia
F35/36	Pawel Piotrowski; Poland	Paulo Souza; Brazil	Guo Wei; China
F37/38	Xuelong Zhang; China	Javad Hardani; Iran	Petr Vratil; Czech Republic
F40	Kovan Abdulraheem; Iraq	Wildan Nukhailawi; Iraq	Kyron Duke; Great Britain
F42	Dechko Ovcharov; Bulgaria	Runar Steinstad; Norway	Casper Schutte; South Africa
F44	Mingjie Gao; China	Changlong Gao; China	Ronald Hertog; Netherlands
F46	Chunliang Guo; China	Daichen Wang; China	Jiangbin Fan; China
F52/53	Abdolreza Jokar; Iran	Henrik Plank; Slovenia	Mauro Maximo de Jesus; Mexico
F54/55/56	Alexey Kuznetsov; Russia	Draženko Mitrović; Serbia	Luis Alberto Zepeda Felix; Mexico
F57/58	Nathan Stephens; Great Britain	Mahmoud Ramadan El Attar; Egypt	Sakchai Yimbanchang; Thailand

== F11 ==
The Men's javelin throw, F11 was held on January 27

F11 = visual impairment may range from no light perception in either eye, to light perception with inability to recognise the shape of a hand.

=== Results ===
==== Final ====
Rank	Athlete	Nationality	#1	#2	#3	#4	#5	#6	Result	Notes
1st place, gold medalist(s)	Bil Marinkovic	Austria	47.47	47.37	46.87	43.30	-	46.34	47.47	
2nd place, silver medalist(s)	Anibal Bello	Venezuela	33.86	41.20	34.83	30.54	43.86	45.62	45.62	
3rd place, bronze medalist(s)	Duan Li	China	35.98	19.22	21.91	x	24.44	27.76	35.98	SB
4	Jasem M.H.A.A. Ibrahem	Kuwait	x	x	x	23.03	22.17	34.54	34.54	SB
5	Nelson Goncalves	Portugal	32.80	30.95	33.20	33.02	x	32.07	33.20	
6	Richard Carr	Canada	28.67	25.09	27.12	29.42	30.19	28.25	30.19	
7	Yudong Bae	South Korea	x	29.56	22.81	x	29.37	x	29.56	

Key: SB = Season Best

== F13 ==
The Men's javelin throw, F13 was held on January 29

- Classification F13 - visual impairment
  - F12: may recognise the shape of a hand, a visual acuity of 2/60 and/or visual field of less than 5 degrees.
  - F13: visual acuity ranges from 2/60 to 6/60, and/or visual field of more than 5 degrees and less than 20 degrees.

=== Results ===
==== Final ====
Rank	Athlete	Nationality	#1	#2	#3	#4	#5	#6	Result	Notes
1st place, gold medalist(s)	Pengkai Zhu	China	61.90	61.24	59.40	48.17	59.77	x	61.90	CR
2nd place, silver medalist(s)	Seyed Erfan Hosseini Liravi	Iran	53.82	54.96	58.80	53.37	61.48	55.62	61.48	WR
3rd place, bronze medalist(s)	Milos Grlica	Serbia	51.17	50.93	52.84	48.39	55.64	60.81	60.81	AR
4	Samir Belhouchet	Algeria	47.54	x	54.55	51.38	50.70	57.64	57.64	AR
5	Miroslaw Pych	Poland	55.32	44.97	47.07	41.31	55.22	44.77	55.32	SB
6	Branimir Budetic	Croatia	54.40	51.32	51.81	52.01	54.71	x	54.71	
7	Chih-Chung Chiang	Chinese Taipei	53.88	49.59	49.53	49.75	51.08	46.59	53.88	
8	Mykola Zabila	Ukraine	50.28	48.88	40.86	x	x	46.67	50.28	SB
9	Aliaksandr Tryputs	Belarus	47.84	46.28	45.67				47.84	SB
10	Marc Lembeck	Germany	45.03	44.75	46.99				46.99	SB
11	Dorian Machado	Venezuela	43.15	43.72	46.14				46.14	SB
12	Octavio Guilabert Mallorca	Spain	x	DNF					DNF	

Key: WR = World Record, CR = Championship Record, AR = Area Record, SB = Season Best, DNF = Did not Finish

== F33/34 ==
The Men's javelin throw, F33/34 was held on January 27

- Classification F33/34
  - F33: some degree of trunk movement when pushing a wheelchair, forward trunk movement limited during forceful pushing. Throwing movements mainly from the arm. Compete in a wheelchair or from a throwing frame.
  - F34: good functional strength, minimal limitation or control problems in the arms or trunk. Compete in a wheelchair or from a throwing frame.

=== Results ===
==== Final ====
Rank	Athlete	Nationality	#1	#2	#3	#4	#5	#6	Result	Points	Notes
1st place, gold medalist(s)	Thierry Cibone	France	33.98	x	35.91	35.71	x	34.46	35.91	999	WR
2nd place, silver medalist(s)	Faouzi Rzig	Tunisia	32.74	33.36	31.25	31.94	33.96	34.59	34.59	990	
3rd place, bronze medalist(s)	Mohamed Ali Krid	Tunisia	x	26.04	x	28.68	30.48	31.30	31.30	960	
4	Damien Bowen	Australia	x	30.11	x	30.01	30.90	x	30.90	955	AR
5	Kamel Kardjena	Algeria	x	x	20.14	19.37	20.73	x	20.73	920	AR
6	Jean Pierre Talatini	France	x	24.84	x	x	x	x	24.84	845	
7	Adel F. N. A. Alrashidi	Kuwait	x	22.02	22.80	21.61	23.66	22.20	23.66	813	SB
8	Roman Musil	Czech Republic	22.98	22.87	x	21.44	23.61	x	23.61	812	
9	Abdulrahman A.H.M.M. Alkandari	Kuwait	20.41	20.25	19.54				20.41	700	SB
10	Siamak Saleh Farajzadeh	Iran	20.15	x	20.27				20.27	695	
11	Raymond O Dwyer	Ireland	19.57	19.76	17.25				19.76	673	
12	Ahmad Almutairi	Kuwait	x	13.33	x				13.33	607	
13	Hani Alnakhli	Saudi Arabia	x	x	x				NM		

Key: WR = World Record, AR = Area Record, SB = Season Best, NM = No Mark

== F35/36 ==
The Men's javelin throw, F35/36 was held on January 22

- Classification F35/36
  - F35: good static balance, problems in dynamic balance, may need assistive devices for walking but not when standing or throwing, may have sufficient lower extremity function to execute a run up when throwing.
  - F36: able to walk without assistance or assistive devices, more control problems with their upper than lower limbs, better leg function than class F35 athletes. Hand control, grasp and release are affected when throwing.

=== Results ===
==== Final ====
Rank	Athlete	Nationality	#1	#2	#3	#4	#5	#6	Result	Notes	
1st place, gold medalist(s)	Pawel Piotrowski	Poland	42.20	41.88	40.56	42.14	x	41.09	42.20	991	CR
2nd place, silver medalist(s)	Paulo Souza	Brazil	34.92	40.06	35.69	33.75	32.64	34.28	40.06	970	
3rd place, bronze medalist(s)	Guo Wei	China	43.33	49.63	51.62	45.45	48.76	47.85	51.62	966	CR
4	Nicholas Newman	South Africa	31.46	33.67	37.16	x	35.62	x	37.16	933	
5	Albin Vidović	Croatia	27.43	25.20	26.49	27.68	28.68	28.05	28.68	745	
6	Fahed H.F.Z. Almutairi	Kuwait	22.55	20.99	x	x	23.33	x	23.33	550	

Key: CR = Championship Record

== F37/38 ==
The Men's javelin throw, F37/38 was held on January 26

- Classification F37/38
  - F37: spasticity in an arm and leg on the same side, good functional ability on the other side, good arm and hand control and follow through.
  - F38: must meet the minimum disability criteria for athletes with cerebral palsy, head injury or stroke, a limitation in function that impacts on sports performance.

=== Results ===
==== Final ====
Rank	Athlete	Nationality	#1	#2	#3	#4	#5	#6	Result	Points	Notes
1st place, gold medalist(s)	Xuelong Zhang	China	53.04	x	-	x	x	x	53.04	975	CR
2nd place, silver medalist(s)	Javad Hardani	Iran	x	39.94	43.71	40.76	44.22	46.15	46.15	968	SB
3rd place, bronze medalist(s)	Petr Vratil	Czech Republic	x	41.81	x	39.93	x	x	41.81	927	
4	Wade McMahon	Australia	40.81	x	43.20	43.10	43.96	43.65	43.96	892	SB
5	Kenneth Paul Churchill	Great Britain	36.80	x	41.39	43.84	43.47	42.49	43.84	891	
6	Mykola Zhabnyak	Ukraine	39.78	x	39.74	40.56	42.52	x	42.52	873	SB
7	Dmitrijs Silovs	Latvia	37.27	40.98	39.32	42.16	x	37.72	42.16	868	SB

Key: CR = Championship Record, SB = Season Best

== F40 ==
The Men's javelin throw, F40 was held on January 28

F40 = dwarfism.

=== Results ===
==== Final ====
Rank	Athlete	Nationality	#1	#2	#3	#4	#5	#6	Result	Notes
1st place, gold medalist(s)	Kovan Abdulraheem	Iraq	36.17	36.32	32.22	x	31.31	x	36.32	CR
2nd place, silver medalist(s)	Wildan Nukhailawi	Iraq	30.23	32.76	33.96	34.98	33.64	34.27	34.98	SB
3rd place, bronze medalist(s)	Kyron Duke	Great Britain	31.20	32.64	31.55	31.17	27.67	26.88	32.64	SB
4	Ivan Bogatyrev	Russia	30.26	30.02	32.06	31.35	x	29.63	32.06	SB
5	Mohamed El Garaa	Morocco	30.93	31.18	x	x	29.68	31.81	31.81	
6	Denis Slunjski	Croatia	21.86	29.24	x	x	x	x	29.24	SB
7	Rachid Rachad Rachid	Morocco	x	26.80	24.29	x	25.48	25.41	26.80	
8	Scott Danberg	United States	23.97	26.56	23.12	25.57	x	x	26.56	

Key: CR = Championship Record, SB = Season Best

== F42 ==
The Men's javelin throw, F42 was held on January 23

F42 = single above knee amputation, or equivalent impairment.

=== Results ===
==== Final ====
Rank	Athlete	Nationality	#1	#2	#3	#4	#5	#6	Result	Notes
1st place, gold medalist(s)	Dechko Ovcharov	Bulgaria	44.10	44.44	44.09	x	40.86	42.43	44.44	
2nd place, silver medalist(s)	Runar Steinstad	Norway	44.39	41.33	x	42.09	41.63	x	44.39	
3rd place, bronze medalist(s)	Casper Schutte	South Africa	35.04	38.91	39.28	39.56	38.54	x	39.56	SB
4	Scott Moorhouse	Great Britain	x	x	36.02	37.18	38.31	38.29	38.31	
5	Heugene Murray	South Africa	35.01	x	x	34.18	33.60	35.62	35.62	
6	Ali Ali	Saudi Arabia	35.13	35.19	x	x	x	31.12	35.19	
7	Bo Rocatis Larsen	Denmark	32.27	33.81	33.27	x	x	x	33.81	
	B Bassam Sawsan	Syria							DNS	

Key: SB = Season Best

== F44 ==
The Men's javelin throw, F44 was held on January 23

F44 = single below knee amputation or equivalent impairment.

=== Results ===
==== Final ====
Rank	Athlete	Nationality	#1	#2	#3	#4	#5	#6	Result	Notes
1st place, gold medalist(s)	Mingjie Gao	China	59.82	x	-	-	-	-	59.82	WR
2nd place, silver medalist(s)	Changlong Gao	China	55.21	x	54.48	54.54	53.20	x	55.21	SB
3rd place, bronze medalist(s)	Ronald Hertog	Netherlands	48.58	49.68	52.37	51.27	49.06	x	52.37	
4	Tony Falelavaki	France	48.88	51.59	52.19	51.76	50.91	49.84	52.19	SB
5	Evgeny Gudkov	Russia	47.02	50.85	49.64	49.05	50.84	50.25	50.85	
6	Maksym Solyankin	Ukraine	47.13	49.61	47.03	46.28	x	48.89	49.61	
7	Tsung-Wei Tsai	Chinese Taipei	45.56	47.88	46.57	44.86	43.35	42.27	47.88	
8	Rory McSweeney	New Zealand	42.71	41.75	39.79	40.23	38.23	40.30	42.71	
9	Jozua Johannes Joubert	South Africa	35.27	x	41.80				41.80	
10	Alexey Ladnyy	Russia	36.99	40.31	40.55				40.55	

Key: WR = World Record, SB = Season Best

== F46 ==
The Men's javelin throw, F46 was held on January 22 with the medal ceremony on January 23

F46 = single above or below elbow amputation, or equivalent impairment.

=== Results ===
==== Final ====
Rank	Athlete	Nationality	#1	#2	#3	#4	#5	#6	Result	Notes
1st place, gold medalist(s)	Chunliang Guo	China	x	54.71	55.65	x	55.90	x	55.90	CR
2nd place, silver medalist(s)	Daichen Wang	China	52.60	x	x	x	x	x	52.60	
3rd place, bronze medalist(s)	Jiangbin Fan	China	48.81	x	49.21	x	43.91	x	49.21	
4	Nikita Prokhorov	Russia	x	41.34	38.01	x	42.32	38.58	42.32	
5	Ravil Diganshin	Uzbekistan	38.25	x	40.47	36.34	38.88	16.98	40.47	
6	Matias Leonel Puebla	Argentina	35.56	x	21.84	x	27.86	x	35.56	AR

Key: CR = Championship Record, AR = Asian Record

== F52/53 ==
The Men's javelin throw, F52/53 was held on January 29

- Classification F52/53
  - F52: good shoulder, elbow and wrist function, poor to normal finger flexion and extension, no trunk or leg function.
  - F53: normal upper limb function, no abdominal, leg or lower spinal function.

=== Results ===
==== Final ====
Rank	Athlete	Nationality	#1	#2	#3	#4	#5	#6	Result	Points	Notes
1st place, gold medalist(s)	Abdolreza Jokar	Iran	20.96	20.59	20.73	19.12	17.69	19.18	20.96	934	CR
2nd place, silver medalist(s)	Henrik Plank	Slovenia	16.12	17.23	x	14.90	x	x	17.23	908	AR
3rd place, bronze medalist(s)	Mauro Maximo de Jesus	Mexico	18.92	19.57	18.19	x	x	19.16	19.57	845	
4	Ales Kisy	Czech Republic	16.75	18.25	17.62	18.11	18.25	19.14	19.14	816	AR
5	Georgios Karaminas	Greece	15.07	15.49	14.42				15.49	767	SB
6	Scott Severn	United States	15.53	17.32	15.99	x	x	16.49	17.32	681	
7	Gerasimos Vryonis	Greece	15.56	x	16.31	16.44	x	x	16.44	612	SB

Key: CR = Championship Record, AR = Area Record, SB = Season Best

== F54/55/56 ==
The Men's javelin throw, F54/55/56 was held on January 24

- Classification F54/55/56
  - F54: normal upper limb function, no abdominal or lower spinal function.
  - F55: normal upper limb function, may have partial to ca. normal trunk function, no leg function.
  - F56: normal upper limb and trunk function, some leg function, may have high bilateral above knee amputation.

=== Results ===
==== Final ====
Rank	Athlete	Nationality	#1	#2	#3	#4	#5	#6	Result	Points	Notes
1st place, gold medalist(s)	Alexey Kuznetsov	Russia	x	x	29.44	x	x	28.76	29.44	999	WR
2nd place, silver medalist(s)	Drazenko Mitrovic	Serbia	25.83	26.12	26.45	x	x	x	26.45	958	
3rd place, bronze medalist(s)	Luis Alberto Zepeda Felix	Mexico	23.11	24.12	22.86	23.01	25.27	24.79	25.27	936	
4	Karol Wojciech Kozun	Poland	29.67	x	29.85	29.20	28.93	x	29.85	926	
5	Zsolt Kanyo	Hungary	x	26.16	26.02	x	25.83	25.74	26.16	695	

Key: WR = World Record

== F57/58 ==
The Men's javelin throw, F57/58 was held on January 28

- Classification F57/58
  - F57: normal upper limb and trunk function, may have bilateral above knee amputations.
  - F58: normal upper limb and trunk function, a bilateral below knee amputation or single above knee amputation.

=== Results ===
==== Final ====
Rank	Athlete	Nationality	#1	#2	#3	#4	#5	#6	Result	Points	Notes
1st place, gold medalist(s)	Nathan Stephens	Great Britain	36.95	35.62	36.02	39.11	32.50	37.89	39.11	884	CR
2nd place, silver medalist(s)	Mahmoud Ramadan El Attar	Egypt	43.53	41.20	x	43.53	x	x	43.53	850	
3rd place, bronze medalist(s)	Sakchai Yimbanchang	Thailand	34.56	41.42	40.11	x	39.62	41.32	41.42	796	
4	Angim Dimitrios Ntomgkioni	Greece	33.09	35.88	35.85	31.89	x	32.67	35.88	792	
5	Nasser Saed Alsahoti	Qatar	40.03	39.36	40.86	40.86	40.41	x	40.86	781	
6	Rostislav Pohlmann	Czech Republic	33.90	x	33.73	33.54	x	34.65	34.65	753	

Key: CR = Championship Record

== See also ==
- 2011 IPC Athletics World Championships – Men's pentathlon
- List of IPC world records in athletics
