= Athletics at the 2012 Summer Paralympics – Men's javelin throw =

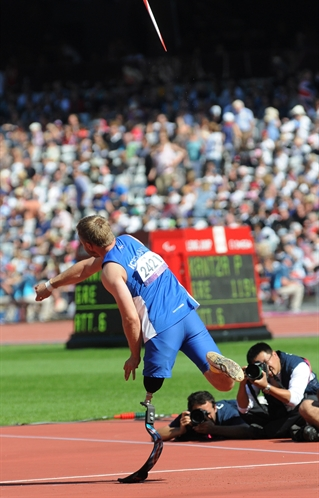

The Men's Javelin Throw athletics events for the 2012 Summer Paralympics took place at the London Olympic Stadium from September 1 to September 8. A total of 8 events were contested incorporating 14 different classifications.

== Schedule ==
Event↓/Date →	Fri 31	Sat 1	Sun 2	Mon 3	Tue 4	Wed 5	Thr 6	Fri 7	Sat 8
F12–13 Javelin Throw						F			
F33–34 Javelin Throw		F							
F40 Javelin Throw								F	
F42 Javelin Throw								F	
F44 Javelin Throw			F						
F52–53 Javelin Throw					F				
F54–56 Javelin Throw									F
F57–58 Javelin Throw									F

== Results ==
=== F12/13 ===
Rank	Athlete	Nationality	Class	1	2	3	4	5	6	Result	Score	Notes
1st place, gold medalist(s)	Pengkai Zhu	China	F12	60.73	64.38	61.03	59.06	60.19	x	64.38	1050	WR
2nd place, silver medalist(s)	Sajad Nikparast	Iran	F12	57.93	59.83	58.29	x	63.15	60.69	63.15	1035	PB
3rd place, bronze medalist(s)	Branimir Budetić	Croatia	F12	56.78	54.11	53.09	51.72	56.35	54.31	56.78	943	
4	Seyed Hosseini	Iran	F13	53.04	54.93	52.43	56.95	55.69	57.94	57.94	939	SB
5	Chiang Chih Chung	Chinese Taipei	F12	56.19	52.77	45.18	51.24	50.79	56.51	56.51	938	SB
6	Miloš Grlica	Serbia	F12	48.79	54.07	x	38.19	47.59	49.43	54.07	896	
7	Mirosław Pych	Poland	F12	48.77	51.29	49.91	52.12	49.22	50.00	52.12	860	SB
8	Samir Belhouchat	Algeria	F13	52.62	48.86	48.71	46.98	x	x	52.62	845	SB
9	Dorian Machado	Venezuela	F13	51.34	51.15	x				51.34	820	SB
10	Jorge Delgado	Cuba	F13	x	x	51.15				51.15	817	SB
11	Mohammed Fannouna	Palestine	F13	40.59	39.40	37.57				40.59	578	

=== F33-F34 ===
Rank	Athlete	Nationality	1	2	3	4	5	6	Best	Notes
1st place, gold medalist(s)	Mohsen Kaedi	Iran	x	34.76	x	33.15	38.30	38.08	38.30	WR
2nd place, silver medalist(s)	Wang Yanzhang	China	36.74	35.97	38.23	32.94	35.92	35.82	38.23	PB
3rd place, bronze medalist(s)	Kamel Kardjena	Algeria	25.36	24.10	26.40	22.20	24.57	24.28	26.40	WR
4	Thierry Cibone	France	29.68	x	36.20	29.26	x	32.01	36.20	RR
5	Faouzi Rzig	Tunisia	30.60	34.89	34.89	33.88	35.86	35.67	35.86	SB
6	Damien Bowen	Australia	33.95	35.72	x	x	34.42	x	35.72	RR
7	Abdulrahman Abdulqadir Abdulrahman	Qatar	34.26	31.37	34.99	32.45	33.44	28.45	34.99	PB
8	Mohamed Ali Krid	Tunisia	32.61	33.34	33.59	28.25	29.99	31.18	33.59	PB
9	Mauricio Valencia	Colombia	33.15	32.88	33.31	-	-	-	33.31	RR
10	Azeddine Nouiri	Morocco	30.31	30.57	29.48	-	-	-	30.57	PB
11	Jean Pierre Talatini	France	x	x	26.75	-	-	-	26.75	PB
12	Mourad Idoudi	Tunisia	17.18	x	18.32	-	-	-	18.32	
13	Mohammad Almehairi	United Arab Emirates	23.70	24.07	23.03	-	-	-	24.07	
14	Adderin Majurin	Malaysia	16.10	17.41	9.47	-	-	-	17.41	
15	Ahmad Almutairi	Kuwait	x	x	17.34	-	-	-	17.34	
16	Mohamed Al Nabhani	Oman	17.33	16.94	x	-	-	-	17.33	PB
17	Raymond O'Dwyer	Ireland	x	18.58	x	-	-	-	18.58	

=== F40 ===
Rank	Athlete	Nationality	1	2	3	4	5	6	Best	Notes
1st place, gold medalist(s)	Wang Zhiming	China	37.57	37.69	34.84	38.30	41.86	47.95	47.95	WR
2nd place, silver medalist(s)	Ahmed Naas	Iraq	39.37	40.09	40.28	42.91	43.27	43.01	43.27	PB
3rd place, bronze medalist(s)	Wildan Nukhailawi	Iraq	41.47	38.94	38.00	35.34	39.38	42.31	42.31	PB
4	Kovan Abdulraheem	Iraq	40.45	41.72	39.82	x	37.88	40.35	41.72	PB
5	Fan Chengcheng	China	37.86	41.48	37.25	39.05	39.35	39.61	41.48	PB
6	Clemarot Christian Nikoua-Rosel	Central African Republic	x	38.60	40.59	x	39.62	x	40.59	RR
7	Mathias Mester	Germany	38.42	x	39.17	38.91	x	39.67	39.67	
8	Kyron Duke	Great Britain	38.64	32.30	33.29	37.63	33.93	34.50	38.64	PB
9	Mohamed Amara	Tunisia	35.58	34.75	30.60	-	-	-	35.58	SB
10	Rachid Rachad	Morocco	29.22	20.63	27.67	-	-	-	29.22	PB

=== F42 ===
Rank	Athlete	Nationality	1	2	3	4	5	6	Best	Notes
1st place, gold medalist(s)	Fu Yanlong	China	46.00	46.65	45.96	x	48.02	52.79	52.79	WR
2nd place, silver medalist(s)	Kamran Shokrisalari	Iran	43.68	52.06	44.32	x	47.37	50.86	52.06	PB
3rd place, bronze medalist(s)	Runar Steinstad	Norway	43.53	45.62	48.10	48.54	46.75	48.90	48.90	PB
4	Casper Schutte	South Africa	40.85	47.88	45.50	48.12	46.78	45.66	48.12	RR
5	Helgi Sveinsson	Iceland	45.46	47.61	43.71	46.47	42.30	42.62	47.61	PB
6	Wang Lezheng	China	45.02	45.01	46.00	41.55	43.77	44.14	46.00	PB
7	Scott Moorhouse	Great Britain	40.06	40.40	44.78	42.03	45.30	41.99	45.30	SB
8	Dechko Ovcharov	Bulgaria	41.49	43.64	40.68	43.69	x	x	43.69	
9	Bassam Bassam Sawsan	Syria	43.10	40.86	41.94	-	-	-	43.10	PB
10	Mladen Tomic	Croatia	34.18	36.96	39.07	-	-	-	39.07	PB
11	Josue Cajuste	Haiti	29.64	30.68	31.38	-	-	-	31.38	SB

=== F44 ===
Rank	Athlete	Nationality	1	2	3	4	5	6	Best	Notes
1st place, gold medalist(s)	Gao Mingjie	China	56.32	58.36	x	58.53	x	55.52	58.53	PR
2nd place, silver medalist(s)	Tony Falelavaki	France	55.47	54.93	58.21	54.64	57.82	54.49	58.21	RR
3rd place, bronze medalist(s)	Ronald Hertog	Netherlands	47.99	55.83	50.83	51.00	x	50.58	55.83	SB
4	Evgeny Gudkov	Russia	50.63	51.25	53.51	53.78	47.78	50.66	53.78	SB
5	Gao Changlong	China	49.46	50.62	x	x	x	48.68	50.62	SB
6	Narender Ranbir	India	45.95	49.50	47.70	x	46.33	44.42	49.50	PB
7	Alister McQueen	Canada	40.84	48.51	46.43	48.57	x	49.32	49.32	PB
8	Jeff Skiba	United States	46.34	45.23	45.52	x	47.50	49.09	49.09	
9	Marcio Fernandes	Cape Verde	46.04	x	23.67	-	-	-	46.04	RR
10	Aloalo Ki Eneio Liku	Tonga	x	34.61	31.07	-	-	-	34.61	SB

=== F52-F53 ===
Rank	Athlete	Nationality	Class	1	2	3	4	5	6	Best	Score	Notes
1st place, gold medalist(s)	Alphanso Cunningham	Jamaica	F53	x	x	19.57	18.50	21.84	x	21.84	985	RR
2nd place, silver medalist(s)	Abdolreza Jokar	Iran	F53	x	20.01	19.87	20.72	20.55	x	20.72	920	
3rd place, bronze medalist(s)	Mauro Maximo de Jesus	Mexico	F53	19.82	20.14	x	19.16	x	x	20.14	883	
4	Henrik Plank	Slovenia	F52	13.40	13.77	14.08	15.17	14.16	15.37	15.37	757	SB
5	Georgios Karaminas	Greece	F52	x	15.37	x	15.09	15.09	x	15.37	757	SB
6	Peter Martin	New Zealand	F52	x	14.44	15.02	x	14.81	15.26	15.26	747	
7	Ales Kisy	Czech Republic	F53	16.27	17.12	16.89	17.43	17.33	16.84	17.43	690	SB
8	Scot Severn	United States	F53	16.69	16.99	x	16.23	x	17.20	17.20	672	
9	Gerasimos Vryonis	Greece	F53	14.50	15.50	14.99	–	–	–	15.50	537	

=== F54–56 ===
Rank	Athlete	Nationality	1	2	3	4	5	6	Best	Notes
1st place, gold medalist(s)	Luis Alberto Zepeda Felix	Mexico	25.00	27.15	27.17	27.00	27.08	28.07	28.07	RR
2nd place, silver medalist(s)	Alexey Kuznetsov	Russia	27.12	27.05	26.27	26.34	27.87	27.54	27.87	
3rd place, bronze medalist(s)	Manolis Stefanoudakis	Greece	26.84	27.24	27.37	26.51	26.88	26.82	27.37	SB
4	Faridul Bin Masri	Malaysia	32.20	34.74	36.13	36.02	34.13	36.78	36.78	RR
5	Draženko Mitrović	Serbia	22.09	22.88	22.99	x	24.34	23.75	24.34	
6	Ibrahim Ibrahim	Egypt	31.57	32.71	34.31	x	x	33.87	34.31	RR
7	Karol Kozun	Poland	27.21	25.79	26.59	26.25	27.62	27.35	27.62	SB
8	Shari Haji Juma'At	Brunei	24.57	26.17	25.72	23.01	22.80	24.93	26.17	
9	Mustafa Yuseinov	Bulgaria	x	24.07	25.85	-	-	-	25.85	SB
10	Leonardo Diaz	Cuba	26.89	28.29	29.92	-	-	-	29.92	SB
11	Khamis Zaqout	Palestine	22.39	19.67	19.79	-	-	-	22.39	
12	Aleksi Kirjonen	Finland	26.36	x	x	-	-	-	26.36	
13	Zsolt Kanyo	Hungary	24.17	26.28	24.21	-	-	-	26.28	
14	Jacob Dahl	Denmark	17.73	16.91	17.70	-	-	-	17.73	
-	Ruzhdi Ruzhdi	Bulgaria	x	x	x	-	-	-	NM	

=== F57–58 ===
Rank	Athlete	Nationality	Class	1	2	3	4	5	6	Best	Score	Notes
1st place, gold medalist(s)	Mohammad Khalvandi	Iran	F58	50.98	50.96	50.33	48.96	47.43	40.48	50.98	1044	WR
2nd place, silver medalist(s)	Claudiney Batista dos Santos	Brazil	F57	37.95	42.90	45.38	44.03	42.14	44.35	45.38	1024	WR
3rd place, bronze medalist(s)	Raed Salem	Egypt	F58	46.55	46.28	47.90	x	47.22	45.92	47.90	991	PB
4	Cao Ngọc Hùng	Vietnam	F58	41.90	45.85	42.34	46.22	46.51	46.01	46.51	964	PB
5	Sakchai Yimbanchang	Thailand	F58	45.46	44.62	45.46	x	46.15	43.77	46.15	957	PB
6	Xu Chongyao	China	F58	x	40.25	44.17	x	44.87	45.48	45.48	943	PB
7	Mohamad Mohamad	Syria	F57	39.77	38.41	35.27	38.71	x	40.54	40.54	920	
8	Fernando Mina Cortes	Colombia	F58	44.27	43.74	41.09	39.38	42.11	36.64	44.27	917	PB
9	Fernando del Rosario Gonzalez	Mexico	F58	42.40	42.97	41.56	-	-	-	42.97	886	SB
10	Nathan Stephens	Great Britain	F57	x	37.09	33.10	-	-	-	37.09	828	
11	Rostislav Pohlmann	Czech Republic	F57	35.48	36.53	35.84	-	-	-	36.53	811	
12	Mor Ndiaye	Senegal	F58	x	38.11	37.66	-	-	-	38.11	757	SB
13	Angim Dimitrios Ntomgkioni	Greece	F57	32.97	x	32.13	-	-	-	32.97	698	
14	Naing Win	Myanmar	F57	x	29.91	28.77	-	-	-	29.91	589	
15	Anastasios Tsiou	Greece	F57	27.85	x	x	-	-	-	27.85	513	
16	Levy Kitambala Kizito	Democratic Republic of the Congo	F58	18.21	x	18.37	-	-	-	18.37	138	PB
-	Munkh-Erdene Chuluundorj	Mongolia	F58	x	x	x	-	-	-	NM	0	
-	Thierry Mabicka	Gabon	F57	-	-	-	-	-	-	DNS	0	
