= 2012 IPC Athletics European Championships – Men's javelin throw =

The men's javelin at the 2012 IPC Athletics European Championships was held at Stadskanaal Stadium from 24–29 July.

== Medalists ==
Results given by IPC Athletics.

Class	Gold	Silver	Bronze
F12/13	Milos Grlica; Serbia	Miroslaw Pych; Poland	Branimir Budetic; Croatia
F33/34/52/53	Georgios Karaminas; Greece	Raymond O'Dwyer; Ireland	Gerasimos Vryonis; Greece
F40	Mathias Mester; Germany	Marek Margoc; Slovakia	Kyron Duke; United Kingdom
F42	Runar Steinstad; Norway	Helgi Sveinsson; Iceland	Dechko Ovcharov; Bulgaria
F44	Ronald Hertog; Netherlands	Evgeny Gudkov; Russia	Maksym Solyankin; Ukraine
F54	Alexey Kuznetsov; Russia	Manolis Stefanoudakis; Greece	Drazenko Mitrovic; Serbia
F55/56	Mustafa Yuseinov; Bulgaria	Ruzhdi Ruzhdi; Bulgaria	Aleksi Kirjonen; Finland
F57/58	Julius Hutka; Slovakia	Angim Dimitrios Ntomgkioni; Greece	Jaroslav Petrous; Czech Republic

== Results ==
=== F12/13 ===
Rank	Class	Athlete	1	2	3	4	5	6	Best	Points	Notes
1st place, gold medalist(s)	F12	Milos Grlica; Serbia	48.00	43.60	55.81	47.25	45.99	X	55.81	927	
2nd place, silver medalist(s)	F12	Miroslaw Pych; Poland	50.79	50.67	47.82	43.78	45.49	45.16	50.79	834	
3rd place, bronze medalist(s)	F12	Branimir Budetic; Croatia	47.55	X	48.64	49.75	49.08	46.65	49.75	813	
4	F12	Aliaksandr Tryputs; Belarus	46.90	48.66	47.88	47.70	46.94	43.04	48.66	790	
5	F12	Hector Cabrera Llacer; Spain	48.26	45.65	47.10	45.76	44.29	36.34	48.26	782	
6	F13	Nemanja Dimitrijevic; Serbia	43.86	45.32	44.31	46.81	43.28	41.45	46.81	725	
7	F12	Grgo Bogdanovic; Croatia	41.13	44.32	36.90	35.10	38.72	43.51	44.32	693	SB
8	F12	Albert van der Mee; Netherlands	32.19	36.80	37.80	36.58	36.44	36.93	37.80	532	
9	F12	Eduardo Sanca; Portugal	X	27.13	X				27.13	266	

=== F33/34/52/53 ===
Rank	Class	Athlete	1	2	3	4	5	6	Best	Points	Notes
1st place, gold medalist(s)	F52	Georgios Karaminas; Greece	X	14.31	X	13.64	12.97	X	14.31	661	
2nd place, silver medalist(s)	F34	Raymond O'Dwyer; Ireland	X	X	17.77	17.08	16.75	X	17.77	582	
3rd place, bronze medalist(s)	F53	Gerasimos Vryonis; Greece	15.17	X	15.63	X	X	X	15.63	547	
4	F53	Ales Kisy; Czech Republic	15.26	X	14.42	14.46	14.88	X	15.26	517	

=== F40 ===
Rank	Class	Athlete	1	2	3	4	5	6	Best	Notes
1st place, gold medalist(s)	F40	Mathias Mester; Germany	37.38	34.27	37.03	37.31	X	X	37.38	
2nd place, silver medalist(s)	F40	Marek Margoc; Slovakia	X	32.48	31.35	31.54	30.40	X	32.48	
3rd place, bronze medalist(s)	F40	Kyron Duke; United Kingdom	X	31.43	28.38	X	X	X	31.43	
4	F40	Paschalis Stathelakos; Greece	28.47	27.72	X	27.53	27.02	30.73	30.73	
5	F40	Yan Shkulka; Russia	X	X	26.61	27.47	X	28.49	28.49	SB
6	F40	Ivan Bogatyrev; Russia	28.12	26.96	26.78	28.07	27.40	25.64	28.12	

=== F42 ===
Rank	Class	Athlete	1	2	3	4	5	6	Best	Notes
1st place, gold medalist(s)	F42	Runar Steinstad; Norway	45.61	43.08	45.77	45.24	46.29	47.94	47.94	SB
2nd place, silver medalist(s)	F42	Helgi Sveinsson; Iceland	44.21	44.63	46.52	39.97	41.33	33.93	46.52	
3rd place, bronze medalist(s)	F42	Dechko Ovcharov; Bulgaria	43.77	43.91	41.58	X	42.03	45.71	45.71	SB
4	F42	Scott Moorhouse; United Kingdom	42.67	41.36	42.04	44.06	43.83	40.99	44.06	
5	F42	Mladen Tomic; Croatia	31.25	37.43	X	X	37.25	36.39	37.43	

=== F44 ===
Rank	Class	Athlete	1	2	3	4	5	6	Best	Notes
1st place, gold medalist(s)	F44	Ronald Hertog; Netherlands	52.09	51.34	49.99	54.75	53.75	51.56	54.75	
2nd place, silver medalist(s)	F44	Evgeny Gudkov; Russia	48.83	44.03	46.02	42.74	45.30	44.21	48.83	
3rd place, bronze medalist(s)	F44	Maksym Solyankin; Ukraine	42.94	45.25	45.51	45.28	45.72	47.94	47.94	
4	F44	Iliyan Petrov; Bulgaria	X	32.51	33.50	X	X	X	33.50	

=== F54 ===
Rank	Class	Athlete	1	2	3	4	5	6	Best	Notes
1st place, gold medalist(s)	F54	Alexey Kuznetsov; Russia	26.90	27.57	26.34	28.29	27.33	26.62	28.29	
2nd place, silver medalist(s)	F54	Manolis Stefanoudakis; Greece	24.62	24.80	25.06	25.11	23.59	24.09	25.11	
3rd place, bronze medalist(s)	F54	Drazenko Mitrovic; Serbia	23.75	X	24.72	X	24.70	X	24.72	
4	F54	Germano Bernardi; Italy	16.70	19.56	18.80	20.79	20.45	19.89	20.79	SB
5	F54	Andreas Gratt; Austria	20.61	X	19.51	X	X	19.20	20.61	SB

=== F55/56 ===
Rank	Class	Athlete	1	2	3	4	5	6	Best	Points	Notes
1st place, gold medalist(s)	F55	Mustafa Yuseinov; Bulgaria	23.88	25.18	24.49	24.51	23.56	24.01	25.18	813	
2nd place, silver medalist(s)	F55	Ruzhdi Ruzhdi; Bulgaria	22.19	23.33	24.36	24.14	21.87	23.67	24.36	786	
3rd place, bronze medalist(s)	F56	Aleksi Kirjonen; Finland	X	X	26.91	28.03	27.47	26.85	28.03	756	SB
4	F55	Georgi Kiryakov; Bulgaria	21.53	22.51	23.44	22.72	X	23.39	23.44	754	SB
5	F56	Zsolt Kanyo; Hungary	23.11	21.64	X	24.37	24.36	X	24.37	628	
6	F55	Dusan Scambura; Czech Republic	19.28	19.21	X	18.54	X	18.62	19.28	573	

=== F57/58 ===
Rank	Class	Athlete	1	2	3	4	5	6	Best	Points	Notes
1st place, gold medalist(s)	F57	Julius Hutka; Slovakia	32.51	33.48	31.72	32.95	34.24	30.07	34.24	740	
2nd place, silver medalist(s)	F57	Angim Dimitrios Ntomgkioni; Greece	X	X	28.81	X	34.03	30.63	34.03	733	
3rd place, bronze medalist(s)	F58	Jaroslav Petrous; Czech Republic	X	34.56	36.95	X	35.47	35.44	36.95	723	ER
4	F57	Anastasios Tsiou; Greece	31.59	30.71	31.87	30.52	26.73	30.21	31.87	660	
5	F58	Musa Davulcu; Turkey	X	X	X	25.64	X	X	25.64	346	

== See also ==
- List of IPC world records in athletics
