= Athletics at the 2008 Summer Paralympics – Men's javelin throw F57–58 =

Men's Javelin F57/58 at the XIII Paralympic Games
- Venue: Beijing National Stadium
- Dates: 16 September
- Competitors: 14 from 13 nations
- Winning distance: 40.84

Medalists
1st place, gold medalist(s)		Mohammadreza Mirzaei Jaberi	Iran
2nd place, silver medalist(s)		Mahmoud Ramadan Elattar	Egypt
3rd place, bronze medalist(s)		Rostislav Pohlmann	Czech Republic

The men's javelin F57/58 event at the 2008 Summer Paralympics took place at the Beijing National Stadium at 09:00 on 16 September. There was a single round of competition; after the first three throws, only the top eight had 3 further throws. The competition was won by Mohammadreza Mirzaei Jaberi, representing Iran.

== Results ==
Rank	Athlete	Nationality	Cl.	1	2	3	4	5	6	Best	Pts.	Notes
1st place, gold medalist(s)	Mohammadreza Mirzaei Jaberi	Iran	F57	38.50	37.76	39.78	40.84	37.15	40.10	40.84	1052	WR
2nd place, silver medalist(s)	Mahmoud Ramadan Elattar	Egypt	F58	47.29	45.04	43.97	47.83	43.38	48.80	48.80	1035	SB
3rd place, bronze medalist(s)	Rostislav Pohlmann	Czech Republic	F57	35.49	37.99	37.55	33.97	39.85	x	39.85	1027	SB
4	Nathan Stephens	Great Britain	F57	37.17	37.27	36.44	38.56	x	37.10	38.56	994	
5	Chinedu Silver Ezeikpe	Nigeria	F58	44.74	39.51	45.86	41.94	45.02	42.68	45.86	973	
6	Mohamad Mohamad	Syria	F57	36.28	37.66	x	35.29	34.25	36.69	37.66	970	SB
7	Xu Chongyao	China	F58	x	x	45.30	44.73	45.62	44.71	45.62	968	SB
8	Julius Hutka	Slovakia	F57	34.66	34.57	35.98	33.18	35.98	35.82	35.98	927	SB
9	Li Liming	China	F58	41.61	43.59	42.14	-	-	-	43.59	925	SB
10	Nasser Saed Al-Sahoti	Qatar	F58	39.80	39.73	41.82	-	-	-	41.82	887	
11	David Rono Boit	Kenya	F57	30.90	33.68	34.40	-	-	-	34.40	886	
12	Win Naing	Myanmar	F57	32.95	33.33	x	-	-	-	33.33	859	
13	Mor Ndiaye	Senegal	F58	33.33	27.14	39.42	-	-	-	39.42	836	
14	Thierry Mabicka	Gabon	F57	x	11.72	x	-	-	-	11.72	302	

WR = World Record. SB = Seasonal Best.
