= Alexey Kuznetsov (field athlete) =

Russian Paralympic athlete

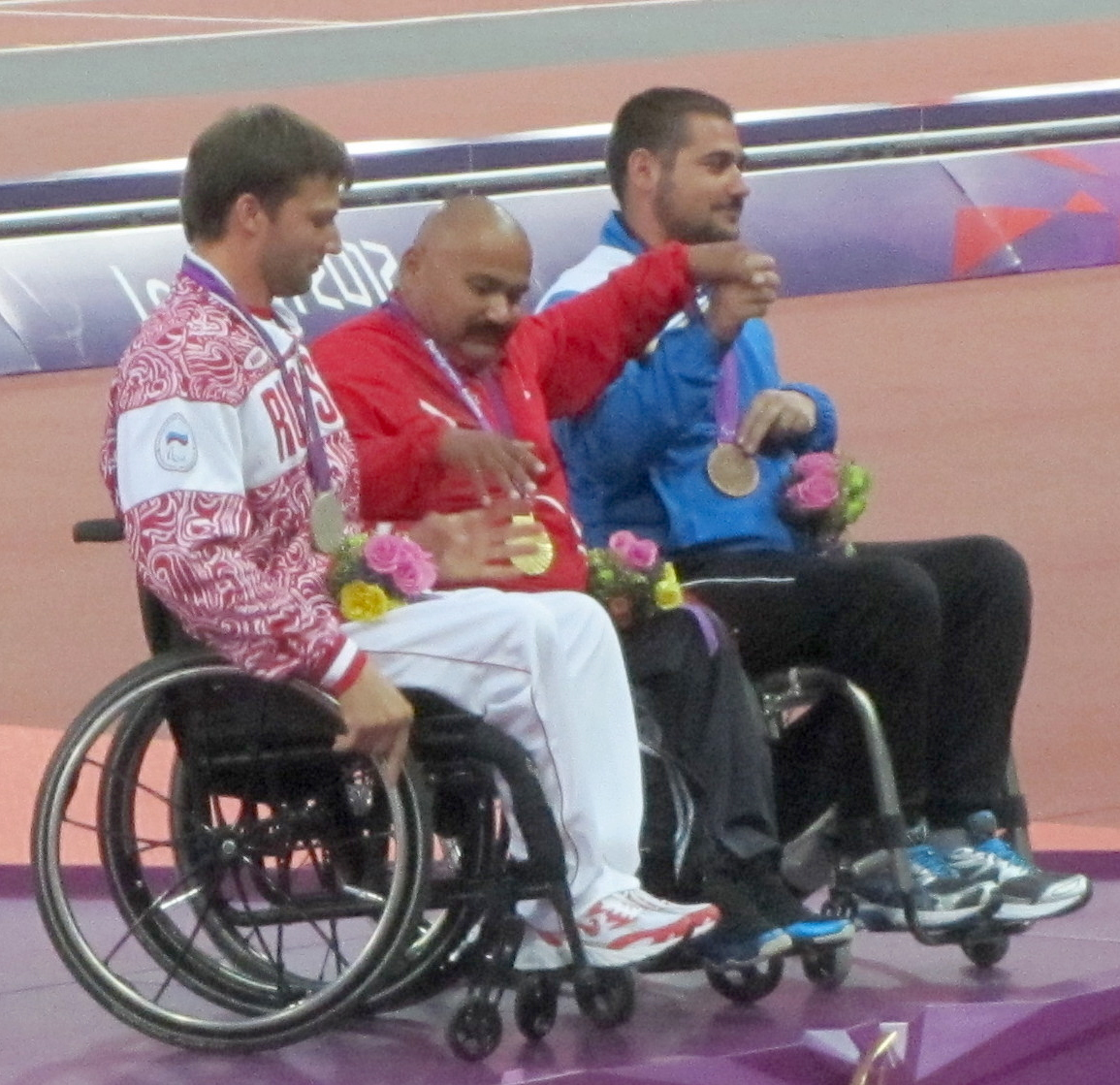
- Kuznetsov (left) at the 2012 paralympics

Personal information
- Born: 3 April 1981 (age 45) Saransk, Russia
- Height: 1.82 m (6 ft 0 in)
- Weight: 72 kg (159 lb)

Sport
- Country: Russia
- Sport: Paralympic athletics
- Disability class: F54
- Event: Throwing events
Medal record
Event	1st	2nd	3rd
Paralympic Games	0	2	0
World Championships	1	1	1
European Championships	3	1	0
Paralympic athletics
Paralympic Games
Representing RPC
Silver medal – second place	2020 Tokyo	Javelin F54
Representing Russia
Silver medal – second place	2012 London	Javelin F54/55/56
IPC Athletics World Championships
Gold medal – first place	2011 Christchurch	Javelin F54–56
Silver medal – second place	2013 Lyon	Javelin F54–56
Bronze medal – third place	2015 Doha	Javelin F54
IPC Athletics European Championships
Gold medal – first place	2012 Stadskanaal	Javelin F54
Gold medal – first place	2014 Swansea	Javelin F54
Gold medal – first place	2016 Grosseto	Javelin F54
Silver medal – second place	2012 Stadskanaal	Discus F54

Alexey Alexeyevich Kuznetsov (Алексей Алексеевич Кузнецов; born 3 April 1981) is a Paralympian athlete from Russia who competes in category F54 throwing events. He participated in the 2008 and 2012 Paralympics and won a silver medal in the javelin throw in 2012.

== Personal history ==
Kuznetsov was born in Saransk in the former Soviet Union in 1981. At the age of five he fell from a fifth floor of a building, resulting in a spinal trauma. He was educated at the International Independent University of Environmental and Political Sciences in Moscow where he studied philology. He is married to his wife, Daria, and they have two sons.

== Athletics career ==
Before turning to athletics Kuznetsov was a world class arm-wrestler, but decided to take up track and field to become a Paralympic champion. He began training in Cheboksary in 2007 and by the following year he was representing Russia at his first Summer Paralympics, Beijing 2008. In China he entered the javelin throw in a mixed points F53–54 category event, finishing sixth overall.

In the build up to the 2012 Summer Paralympics in London, he entered the 2011 IPC Athletics World Championships in Christchurch. Competing in three throwing events, he found success in his favoured javelin, with a distance of 29.44 m giving Kuznetsov his first major international gold medal. The following year he travelled to Stadskanaal to represent Russia at the 2012 IPC Athletics European Championships. He won bronze in the discus and gold in the javelin. Just a few months later Kuznetsov was at his second Paralympics, in London, where he competed in the javelin throw. He led the field until the final round, where his leading throw of 27.87 was beaten by Mexico's Luis Alberto Zepeda Felix, leaving Kuznetsov with the silver medal.

In the build-up to the 2016 Summer Paralympics in Rio, Kuznetsov managed to retain his European title in the javelin throw in both Swansea in 2014 and again in Grosseto in 2016. The world title proved more elusive, with a silver medal in the 2013 World Championships in Lyon and a bronze medal in the 2015 World Championships in Doha.
