= Baškovce =

Baškovce may refer to:

- Baškovce, Humenné District, Slovakia
- Baškovce, Sobrance District, Slovakia
