= Runar Steinstad =

Norwegian Paralympic athlete

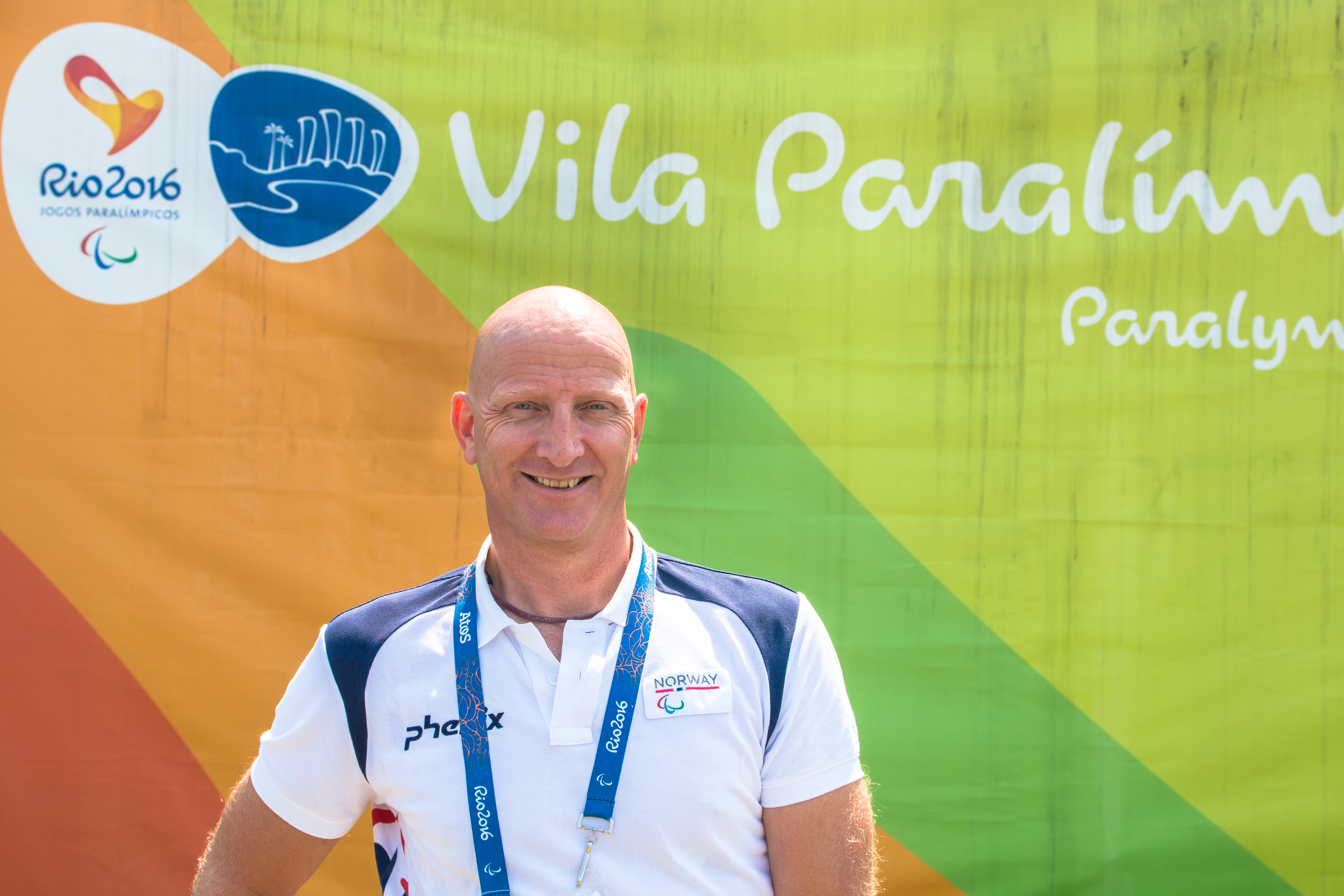

Personal information
- Born: 4 June 1967 (age 59) Bø, Norway
- Height: 187 cm (74 in)

Sport
- Country: Norway
- Sport: Athletics
- Disability class: F42
- Event: javelin throw
- Club: IL Runar: Sandefjord
- Coached by: Paul Andre Solberg
Medal record
Track and field
Representing Norway
Paralympic Games
Bronze medal – third place	2012 London	Javelin – F42
IPC World Championships
Silver medal – second place	2011 Christchurch	Javelin – F42
Bronze medal – third place	2006 Assen	Javelin – F42
Bronze medal – third place	2013 Lyon	Javelin – F42
IPC European Championships
Gold medal – first place	2011 Stadskanaal	Javelin – F42
Silver medal – second place	2014 Swansea	Javelin – F42
Bronze medal – third place	2016 Grosseto	Javelin – F42

Runar Steinstad (born 4 June 1967) is a Paralympian athlete from Norway competing mainly in F42 classification throwing events.

== Athletics history ==
Steinstad first represented Norway at the 2000 Summer Paralympics in Sydney, entering the long jump, 100 metre sprint and javelin throw events (F42). In the subsequent Paralympics after Sydney, Steinstad dropped the long jump and sprint events and focused on the javelin. He competed at both the 2004 Summer Paralympics in Athens and the 2008 Summer Paralympics in Beijing, finishing in the javelin sixth and tenth respectively. Paralympic success came in the 2012 Games in London, where he threw a distance of 48.90 to claim the bronze medal.

As well as his Paralympic appearances, Steinstad has also been part of six Norwegian teams to compete at the IPC Athletics World Championships, beginning in Birmingham, England in 1998 and qualified for the subsequent five games, taking him up to Doha in 2015. At the World Championships he won a silver and two bronze medals, all in the javelin throw.

== Personal history ==
Steinstad was born in Bø, Norway in 1967. Whilst a teenager, Steinstad was diagnosed with osteosarcoma (bone cancer). His left leg was amputated above the knee to treat the disease.
