= Fu Yanlong =

Chinese Paralympic athlete

Personal information
- Born: 23 June 1988 (age 38) Jilin, China
- Height: 170 cm (67 in)

Sport
- Country: China
- Sport: Athletics
- Disability class: F42
- Event(s): shot put discus throw javelin throw
- Club: Jilin Province
- Coached by: Xue Wei (national)
Medal record
Track and field
Representing China
Paralympic Games
Gold medal – first place	2012 London	Javelin - F42
IPC World Championships
Silver medal – second place	2013 Lyon	Javelin - F42
Asian Para Games
Gold medal – first place	2014 Incheon	Javelin - F42/44
Gold medal – first place	2014 Incheon	Discus - F42
Silver medal – second place	2010 Guangzhou	Javelin - F42

Fu Yanlong (born 23 June 1988) is a Paralympian athlete from China competing mainly in F42 classification throwing events.

== Athletics history ==
Fu represented China at the 2012 Summer Paralympics in London, entering the discus and Javelin throw events (F42). In the discus he finished ninth, but a throw of 52.79 metres in the javelin gave him a Paralympic gold medal. As well as the Paralympics Hou has also been part of two Chinese teams to compete at the IPC Athletics World Championships, in 2013 in Lyon and 2015 in Doha. In Lyon he won the silver in the F42 javelin.

== Personal history ==
Fu was born in Jilin, China in 1988. At the age of one he was diagnosed with polio, which has resulted in an impairment to his leg.
