= Kenfig Hill =

Coordinates: 51.538341°N 3.681174°W

Kenfig Hill: Welsh: Mynydd Cynffig
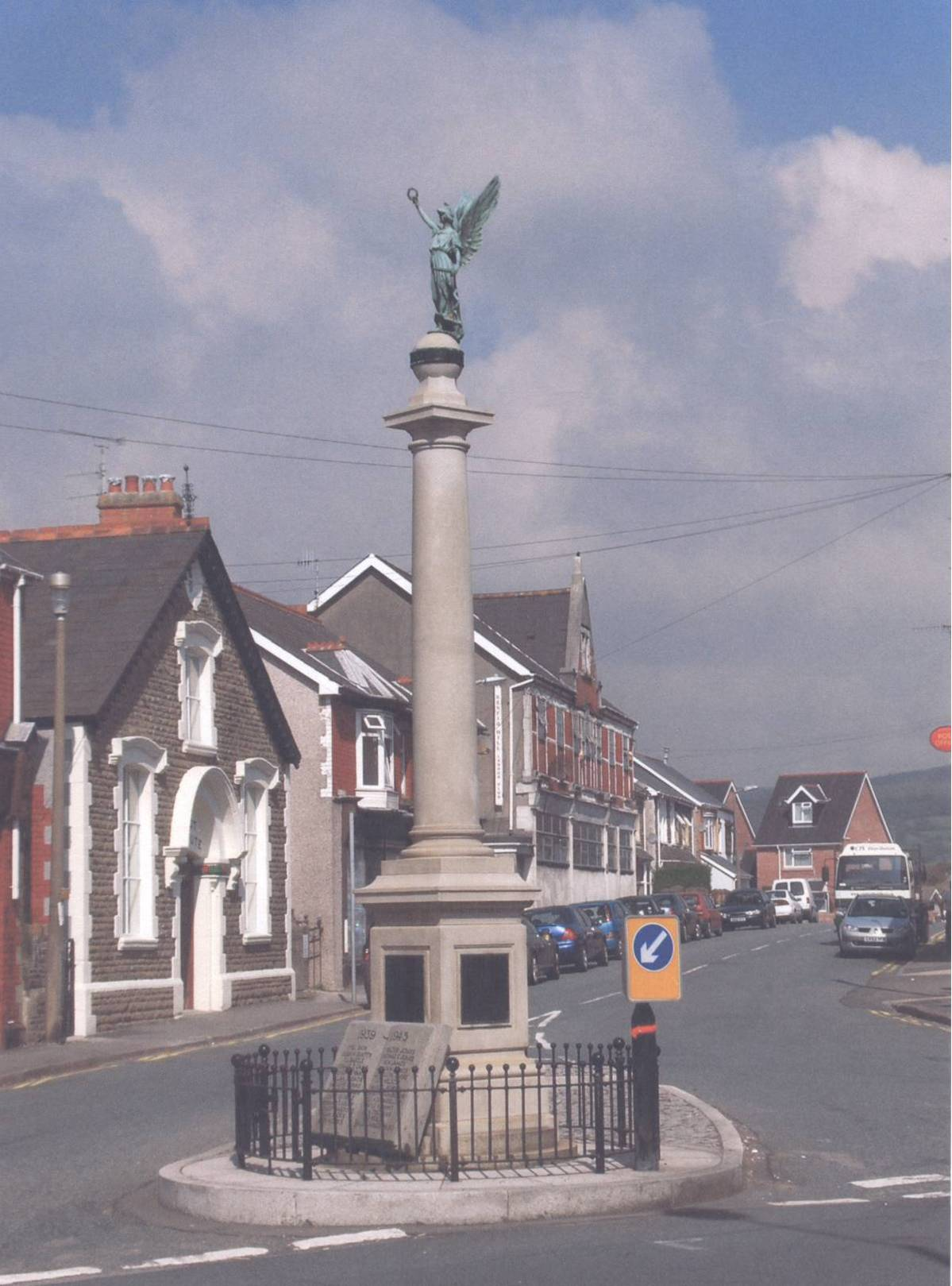
- Kenfig Hill war memorial

- Location within Bridgend
- OS grid reference: SS835835
- Principal area: Bridgend
- Preserved county: Mid Glamorgan
- Country: Wales
- Sovereign state: United Kingdom
- Post town: BRIDGEND
- Postcode district: CF33
- Dialling code: 01656
- Police: South Wales
- Fire: South Wales
- Ambulance: Welsh
- UK Parliament: Bridgend
- Senedd Cymru – Welsh Parliament: Bridgend

Kenfig Hill (Welsh: Mynydd Cynffig) is a village in Bridgend County Borough, South Wales. It is bordered by Pyle to the south-west, Cefn Cribwr to the north-east, North Cornelly to the south and Moel Ton-Mawr mountain to the north.

The nearest train station is Pyle on the South Wales Main Line. The largest nearby outside connection is the M4 just south of the village that leads from Carmarthenshire to London.

== Sport and leisure ==
Bedford Park is a popular park for leisure activities. Kenfig Hill RFC are a rugby union team founded in 1897, and play their home games at Croft Goch Playing Fields. The village is also home to Kenfig Hill AFC, an association football team that competes in the Port Talbot Football League. It is also the home of Cougars Basketball Club who have been operating at Cynffig Comprehensive School since the team was established in 2006. Playing in the Welsh National league (BWNL) and South Wales league (SWBA).

== Notable buildings ==
The village of Kenfig Hill has several buildings of note, historical and modern. St Theodore church, began in 1889 and completed in 1891, was designed by Halliday & Anderson, with the south aisle added in 1909 by Cook and Edwards of Bridgend. Moriah Chapel is built in the early 19th century tradition, architect unknown but believed to have been completed in 1850 with the full-width porch a later addition.

Cynffig Comprehensive School, constructed between 1957 and 1961, was designed by Denis Clarke Hall. It has been described as the "most complete expression of post-war Modernism in the county".

== Notable residents ==
- Arthur Bassett, dual-code international rugby player
- Peter Cottrell, soldier, sailor and author
- Cliff Davies, international rugby union player and British Lion
- Alan Edwards, international rugby league player
- Jayce Lewis, musician and producer
- Howard Marks, author and drug smuggler
- Brian Radford, international rugby league player
- Nathan Stephens, athlete and Paralympian
