= Brian Radford =

Wales international rugby league & union footballer

Personal information
- Full name: Brian Radford
- Born: 17 March 1926 Kenfig Hill, Bridgend, Wales
- Died: 2007 Kenfig Hill, Bridgend, Wales

Playing information

Rugby union
Club
Years	Team	Pld	T	G	FG	P
≤1949–≤49	Kenfig Hill RFC
≤1949–≤49	Aberavon RFC
	Total	0	0	0	0	0

Rugby league
- Position: Prop, Second-row
Club
Years	Team	Pld	T	G	FG	P
1948–59	Bradford Northern	333	47	0	0	141
Representative
Years	Team	Pld	T	G	FG	P
1952	Wales	1	0	0	0	0

Brian Radford (1926 – 2007) was a Welsh rugby union, and professional rugby league footballer who played in the 1940s and 1950s. He played club level rugby union (RU) for Kenfig Hill RFC, Aberavon RFC and Neath RFC, and representative level rugby league (RL) for Wales, and at club level for Bradford Northern, as a prop or second-row.

== Background ==
Brian Radford was born in Kenfig Hill, Wales, and he died in Kenfig Hill, Wales.

== Playing career ==
=== International honours ===
Brian Radford won a cap for Wales while Bradford Northern in 1952.

=== Championship final appearances ===
Brian Radford played at prop in Bradford Northern's 6-13 defeat by Wigan in the Championship Final during the 1951–52 season at Leeds Road, Huddersfield on Saturday 10 May 1952.

=== Challenge Cup Final appearances ===
Brian Radford played in every round of the Challenge Cup but was left out for the final, fellow Welshman Frank Whitcombe played at prop, with Barry Tyler moving back in to the second-row in Bradford Northern's 12-0 victory over Halifax in the 1949 Challenge Cup Final during the 1948-49 season at Wembley Stadium, London on Saturday 7 May 1949.
