= Yogev Kenzi =

Israeli Paralympic athlete

Personal information
- Native name: יוגב קנזי
Medal record
Event / 1st / 2nd / 3rd; Paralympic Games / 0 / 0 / 1
Representing Israel
Paralympic Games
Men's para athletics
Bronze medal – third place	2000 Sydney	Long jump F46

Yogev Kenzi (Hebrew: יוגב קנזי; born 1974) is a former Paralympic athlete representing Israel.

== Biography ==
Kenzi was born with a disability in his left arm.

At the 1996 Summer Paralympics, he competed in the Men's 100 metre, 200 metre and 400 metre events, as well as long jump. He then focused solely on long jump, achieving bonze medal at the 2000 Summer Paralympics and ranking eighth at the 2004 Summer Paralympics. He was trained by Olympic athlete David Kushnir.

In a para-athletics European championship in 2001, Kenzi achieved a silver medal in long jump.

At the 2014 IPC Athletics European Championships – Men's javelin throw event he was ranked sixth.

Kenzi holds a master's degree in economics and is a licensed insurance broker and securities investment advisor. He previously worked at Bank Hapoalim, Bank Mizrahi-Tefahot and Menora Insurance Group, as well as internship in real estate appraisal at the Ministry of Justice.

== See also ==
- Israel at the 1996 Summer Paralympics
- Israel at the 2000 Summer Paralympics
- Israel at the 2004 Summer Paralympics
