= Peter Cottrell =

British sailor, writer and historian

Peter James Cottrell (born 1964 ) is a Welsh soldier, sailor, writer, educator and revisionist military historian of the Irish War of Independence and Irish Civil War.

== Career ==
Cottrell is the author of the best-selling military history The Anglo-Irish War: The Troubles 1913–23 which challenges traditional nationalist interpretations of the Easter Rising; the role of the Royal Irish Constabulary and the popularity of the IRA campaign whilst supporting the view that the conflict was as much an Irish civil war as a struggle for independence from the UK.

He grew up in the village of Kenfig Hill, Mid-Glamorgan in South Wales and between 1981 and 2008 served in the ranks of the British Territorial Army and as an officer in both the Royal Navy and British Army and saw operational service in the Middle East, Bosnia, Afghanistan and Northern Ireland.

After qualifying as a teacher he was commissioned into the Royal Navy in 1988 and transferred to the British Army in 1995, ending his military career as a Major. He is a great-great nephew of the English rugby player George Cottrell, and a member of the Royal Dublin Fusiliers Association.

== Works ==
- The Militarisation of Policing in Ireland: 1913–22 (Open University MA Thesis 2002)
- Myth, the Military and Anglo-Irish Policing 1913–1922 (British Army Review No 133, Winter 2003)
- The Anglo-Irish War, The Troubles, 1913–23 (Osprey Publishing 2006) ISBN 978-1-84603-023-9
- The Irish Civil War 1922–23 (Osprey Publishing 2008) ISBN 978-1-84603-270-7
- The War for Ireland 1913–23 – Editor and principal contributing author (Osprey Publishing 2009) ISBN 978-1-84603-996-6
- I Am Soldier – Contributing author (Osprey Publishing 2009) ISBN 1-84603-515-5
- Lies, damned lies and statistics: a British perspective of policing the Anglo-Irish War. Paper delivered to the Military History Society of Ireland/National Museum of Ireland Conference marking the ninetieth anniversary of the outbreak of the Anglo-Irish War, Dublin, October 2009
- England's Janissary (Robert Hale Ltd, February 2012) ISBN 0-7090-9330-6 – An historical novel set during the Anglo-Irish War
- Wyrdegrove (Kindle Direct Publishing, 2012) ISBN 978-1719848855 – An historical fantasy novel set in Afghanistan and the English Civil War
- The Lambs (Robert Hale Ltd, February 2014) ISBN 978-0-7198-1183-8 – The prequel to England's Janissary set during The Great War
