= Aleksi Kirjonen =

Finnish Paralympic athlete

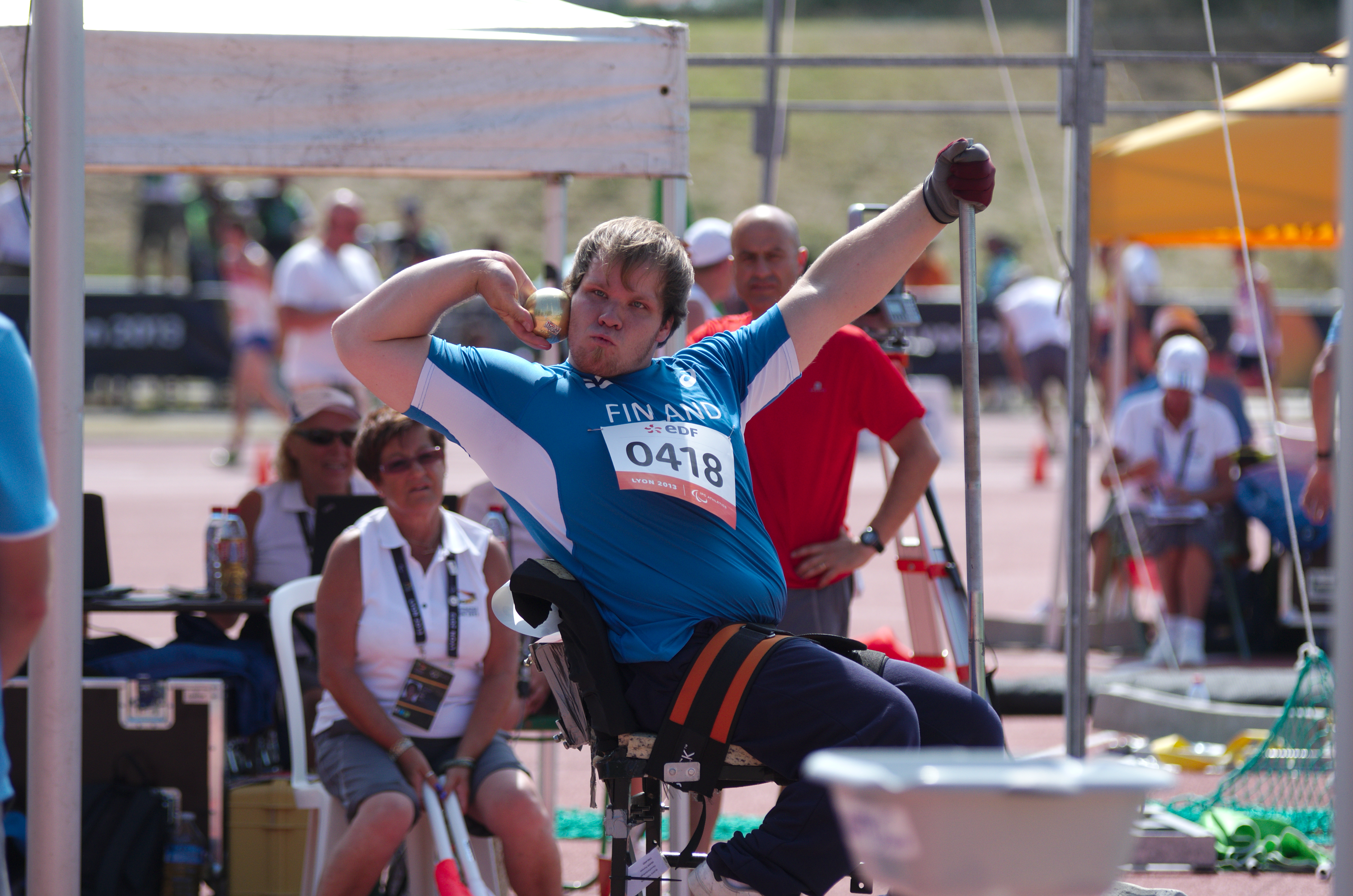
- Kirjonen at the 2013 World Championships

Personal information
- Nationality: Finnish
- Born: 29 May 1993 (age 33)

Sport
- Country: Finland
- Sport: Athletics
- Event: shot put
- Club: Espoon Tapiot
- Coached by: Markku Niinimaki

Achievements and titles
- Paralympic finals: 2012
Medal record
Track and field (athletics)
Representing Finland
IPC World Championships
Bronze medal – third place	2013 Lyon	Shot put – F56–57
IPC European Championships
Gold medal – first place	2014 Swansea	Javelin – F56
Bronze medal – third place	2012 Stadskanaal	Javelin – F55–56
Bronze medal – third place	2014 Swansea	shot put – F57
Bronze medal – third place	2016 Grosseto	Shot put – F57

Aleksi Kirjonen (born 29 May 1993) is a Paralympian athlete from Finland competing mainly in category F56 throwing events.

== Career ==
Kirjonen was born in 1993. Disabled since birth, he has no function in both his legs. He took up athletics while still in secondary education. In 2011 he travelled to Dubai to compete in the World Junior Championships for Wheelchair Athletes. There he won both the men's shot put and javelin events.

In July 2012 he travelled to Staddskanaal to represent Finland in the IPC Athletics European Championships. There he collected the bronze medal in the men's F55/56 javelin throw. He followed this by being selected to represent Finland at the 2012 Summer Paralympics in London, again in both his favoured throwing events. In the shot put, a joint F55/56 event, his best throw in the first round of 11.89m only gave him enough points to finish 11th, denying him the chance to progress to the final round. In the javelin Kirjonen threw 26.36 in his first throw, but fouled his remaining two attempts leaving him outside the top eight after the first round.

The following year he was back on the podium when he competed in the 2013 IPC Athletics World Championships in Lyon. He competed in a joint F55/56 shot put finishing third to take the bronze medal.
