= Julius Hutka =

Slovak Paralympic athlete

Július Hutka
Personal information
- Born: 18 March 1974 (age 52) Baškovce, Humenné District, Czechoslovakia

Sport
- Country: Slovakia
- Sport: Paralympic athletics
- Disability: Paresis
- Disability class: F57
- Event(s): Javelin throw Shot put
Medal record
Paralympic athletics
Representing Slovakia
Paralympic Games
Bronze medal – third place	2004 Athens	Shot put F57
World Championships
Bronze medal – third place	2006 Assen	Javelin throw F57
European Championships
Gold medal – first place	2012 Stadskanaal	Javelin throw F57
Silver medal – second place	2018 Berlin	Javelin throw F57

Július Hutka (born 18 March 1974) is a Paralympic former athlete from Slovakia competing mainly in category F57 shot put and javelin events.

Hutka has competed in the javelin three times in the Paralympics without winning a medal but he has won a bronze in the shot put in 2004 but could not match it in 2008.

Hutka worked as a builder, he went to Russia to do construction work. He fell from a height and damaged his spinal cord, he has been in a wheelchair since his serious accident.
