= Mahmoud Ramadan Elattar =

Egyptian Paralympic athlete

Medal record

Paralympic athletics

Representing Egypt

Paralympic Games
Silver medal – second place	2008 Beijing	Javelin Throw – F57/58

Mahmoud Ramadan Elattar is a Paralympian athlete from Egypt competing mainly in category F57/58 throwing events.

Ramadan competed in both the F57/58 discus and javelin in the 2008 Summer Paralympics, taking home the silver medal in the javelin.
