= Luis Alberto Zepeda Félix =

Mexican Paralympic athlete (born 1965)

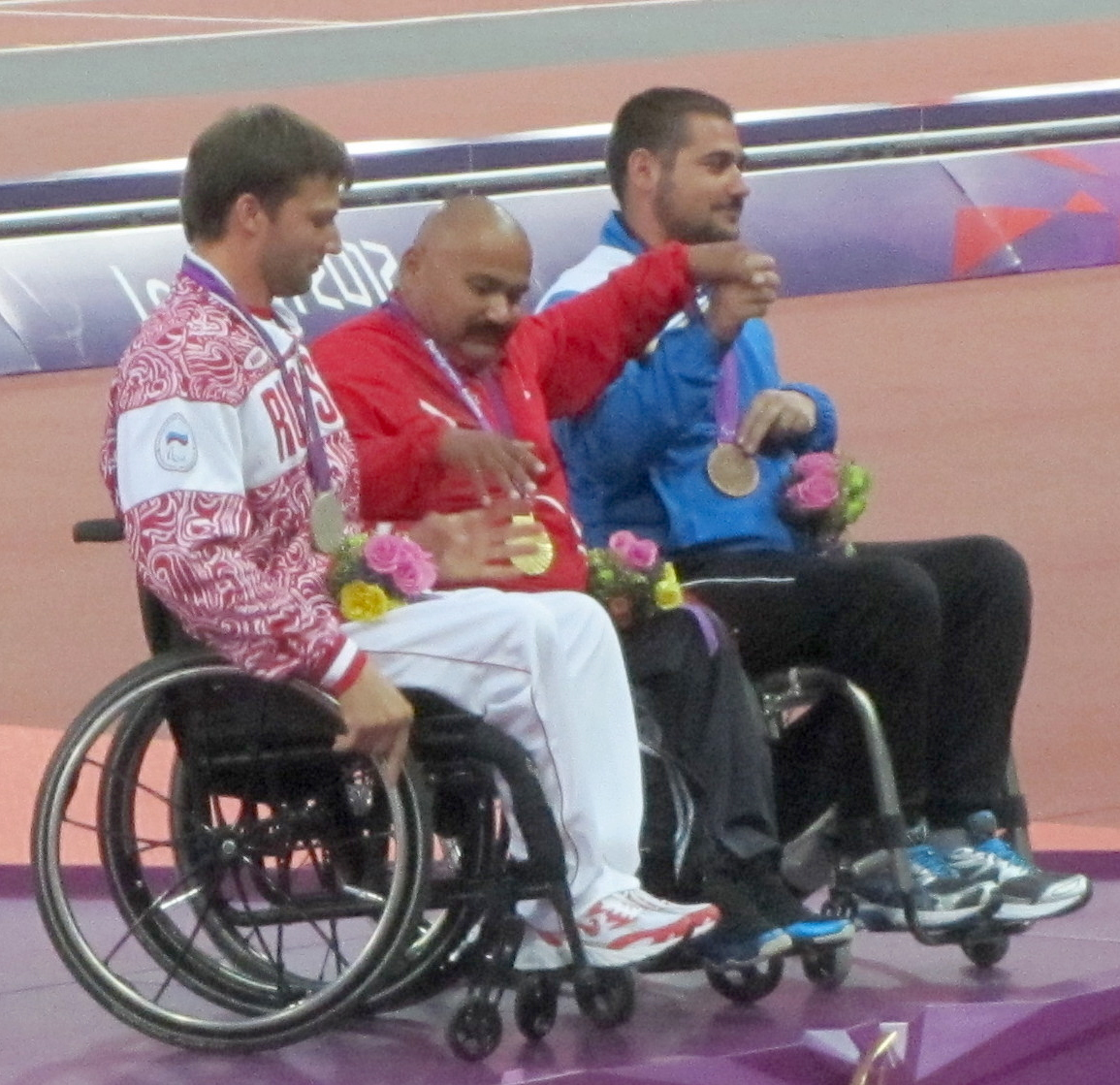
- Félix (center) at the 2012 Paralympics

Personal information
- Born: 1 September 1965 (age 60)

Sport
- Sport: Paralympic athletics
- Disability class: F54
- Events: Javelin throw, discus throw, shot put
Medal record
Representing Mexico
Paralympic Games
Gold medal – first place	2004 Athens	Javelin throw F54
Bronze medal – third place	2008 Beijing	Javelin throw F53–54
Gold medal – first place	2012 London	Javelin throw F54/55/56
Silver medal – second place	2016 Rio	Javelin throw F53/54
IPC World Championships
Silver medal – second place	2011 Christchurch	Javelin throw F54/55/56
Gold medal – first place	2013 Lyon	Javelin throw F54/55/56
Parapan American Games
Gold medal – first place	2011 Guadalajara	Javelin throw F54/55/56
Silver medal – second place	2007 Rio de Janeiro	Javelin throw F33/34/52/53
Silver medal – second place	2015 Toronto	Javelin throw F53/54/55

Luis Alberto Zepeda Félix (born 1 September 1965) is a Mexican Paralympic athlete who competes in category F54 throwing events.

At the 2004 Summer Paralympics Luis competed in the shot put, discus throw and javelin throw, winning a gold medal in the javelin. He then won gold in Beijing, bronze in London and silver at the Rio Paralympic Games in the same event.
