= Miloš Grlica =

Personal information
- Born: 3 January 1979 (age 47) Cacak, Serbia

Sport
- Sport: Track and field Goalball
- Event: Javelin throw

Achievements and titles
- Personal best: 60.81m
Medal record
Paralympic athletics
Representing Serbia
Paralympic Games
Bronze medal – third place	2004 Athens	Javelin Throw - F12
IPC Athletics World Championships
Bronze medal – third place	2011 Christchurch	Javelin Throw – F13
IPC Athletics European Championships
Gold medal – first place	2005 Espoo	Javelin throw- F12
Gold medal – first place	2012 Stadskanaal	Javelin throw- F12/13
Silver medal – second place	2014 Swansea	Javelin throw- F12

Miloš Grlica (born 3 January 1979) is a Paralympic retired athlete from Serbia competing mainly in category F12 javelinand pentathlon events.

He entered the secondary school for children with special needs ˝Veljko Ramadanović˝ in Zemun, Belgrade, because of the problems with his eyesight. Grlica entered the field of sports when he was 11 years old. He then graduated from the medical high school, department for Physiotherapy for physiotherapists with impaired eyesight. Then he graduated athletics coach and goalball coach on Faculty of Sport and Physical Education, University of Niš.

He has been a member of the sport representation of the Federal Republic of Yugoslavia, then the State Union of Serbia and Montenegro and finally of the Republic of Serbia since 1995. So far, he participated in six World Para Athletics Championships and World Para Athletics European Championships, three Balkans game events and four Paralympic Games. As already mentioned, Miloš's specialty is F12 category javelin. In 2016. Miloš has been retired from professional athletics sport. The most important Grlica's achievements in competitions are:

- 2004 – bronze medal at the 2004 Summer Paralympics
- 2005 – gold medal at 2005 IPC Athletics European Championships in Finland
- 2007 – bronze medal at the World Championship for athletes with visual impairment in São Paulo, Brasil
- 2011 – bronze medal, including the setting of his personal as well as the new European record of 60.81 meters at 2011 IPC Athletics World Championships in New Zealand
- 2011 – silver medal at the World Championship for visual impaired athletes in Anatolia, Turkey
- 2012 – gold medal at 2012 IPC Athletics European Championships in the Netherlands
- 2014 – silver medal at 2014 IPC Athletics European Championships in Wales
- 2015 Miloš starts with revie in goalball sport in Serbia as coach and also as organiser. His first assistant in goalball team is Dragan Sremčević, goalball coach, the world goalball legend, winner of Paralympic bronze in 1984. in New York, also winner gold medal at Paralympic games in Seoul 1988. Dragan has been a few times first in Europe and also in the world in goalball. Dragan was proclaimed best player in this competitions. Miloš also have big support for this huge project of revevel goalball sport in Serbia from Faculty of Sport and Physical Education, University of Niš, Serbia.

Miloš Grlica has been declared the best sportsman of the city of Beograd consecutively in 2003, 2004, 2005. and 2007. He has also been declared the sportsman of the year 2004. and 2005. of the State Union of Serbia and Montenegro. Grlica is the bearer of the National Sport Merits Award and had received the May Award of the Serbian Sport Union. Miloš is married and has two children.
