= Baškovce, Humenné District =

Baškovce
- Municipality
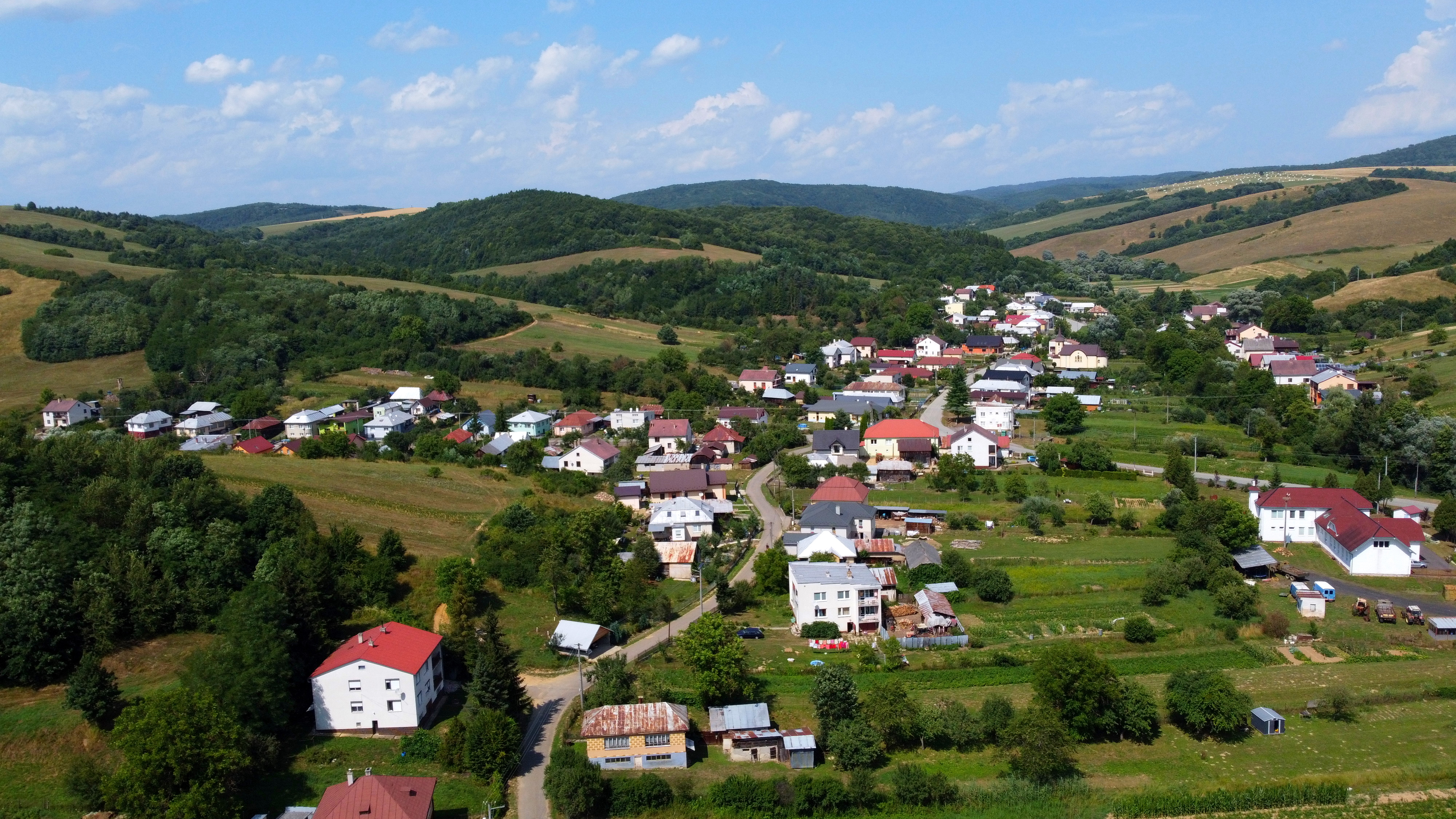

- Flag

- Location of Baškovce in the Prešov Region Location of Baškovce in Slovakia
- Coordinates: 49.03°N 21.83°E
- Country: Slovakia
- Region: Prešov Region
- District: Humenné District
- First mentioned: 1410

Area
  - Total: 6.66 km^{2} (2.57 sq mi)
- Elevation: 194 m (636 ft)

Population (2025)
  - Total: 389
- Time zone: UTC+1 (CET)
  - Summer (DST): UTC+2 (CEST)
- Postal code: 672 3
- Area code: +421 57
- Vehicle registration plate (until 2022): HE
- Website: www.obecbaskovce.sk

Baškovce (Hungarian: Felsőbaskóc) is a village and municipality in the Humenné District in the Prešov Region of eastern Slovakia. The mayor is Pavol Tamáš.

== History ==
In historical records the village was first mentioned in 1410.

== Geography ==
The municipality lies at an altitude of 194 metres (636 ft) and covers an area of 6.66 km^{2} (2.57 sq mi) (2025).

== Population ==
Population statistic (10 years)
Year	1995	2005	2015	2025
Count	436	424	426	389
Difference		−2.75%	+0.47%	−8.68%

Population statistic
Year	2024	2025
Count	388	389
Difference		+0.25%

It has a population of 389 people (31 December 2025).

=== Ethnicity ===
Census 2021 (1+ %)
Ethnicity	Number	Fraction
Slovak	399	99%
Not found out	6	1.48%
Total	403	

In year 2021 was 403 people by ethnicity 399 as Slovak, 6 as Not found out, 4 as Rusyn and 1 as Czech.

Note on population: The difference values of population numbers in the table "Population statistic" and in the sections "Ethnicity" & "Religion" is caused by the use of various statistical methods.

=== Religion ===
Census 2021 (1+ %)
Religion	Number	Fraction
Roman Catholic Church	386	95.78%
Greek Catholic Church	9	2.23%
None	5	1.24%
Total	403	

In year 2021 was 403 people by religion 386 from Roman Catholic Church, 9 from Greek Catholic Church, 5 from None, 2 from Eastern Orthodox Church and 1 from Not found out.

== Genealogical resources ==
The records for genealogical research are available at the state archive in Prešov (Slovak: Štátny archív v Prešove).

- Roman Catholic church records (births/marriages/deaths): 1804-1914 (parish B)
- Greek Catholic church records (births/marriages/deaths): 1820-1949 (parish B)

== See also ==
- List of municipalities and towns in Slovakia
