= Scott Moorhouse =

British Paralympic athlete

Personal information
- Nationality: British
- Born: 24 May 1989 (age 37) Ipswich, England
- Website: www.scottmoorhouse.co.uk

Sport
- Country: Great Britain
- Sport: Athletics
- Event: F42 Javelin
- Club: Windsor, Slough, Eton and Hounslow Athletic Club
- Coached by: Dan Pfaff

Achievements and titles
- Paralympic finals: 2012 Summer
- Personal best: Javelin: 50.08m

Scott Moorhouse (born 24 May 1989) is a Paralympian track and field athlete from England competing mainly in category F42 javelin throw. He represented Great Britain at the 2012 Paralympic Games in London.

== Biography ==
Moorhouse was born, Scott Paul William Durst, in Ipswich in 1989. At the age of six weeks a severe burn resulted in the amputation of his left leg through the knee. In 2008, while working in telecommunications, Moorhouse's manager heard a radio promotion from Paralympic GB who were running a talent day in London. He gave Moorhouse the day off to attend, and Moorhouse showed promise in several different disciplines at the meet. He decided to follow athletics and began training in 2009 with Windsor, Hounslow and Eton Athletics Club, showing promise in both the sprint and throwing events.

In June 2010 he threw 41.25 to come fourth in a senior meet in Cardiff, and followed this with a second place in the World Junior Championship in the Czech Republic. In 2011 he was part of the Great Britain squad that travelled to Christchurch in New Zealand to take part in the IPC Athletic Championships, he finished 4th in the F42 javelin, throwing 38.31. In April he attended his second Junior World Championship, this time finishing third. Despite having to miss training to concentrate on his academic studies beforehand, his results in an IWAS Series meet in Stadskanaal in the Netherlands saw Moorhouse beat his personal best with three of his throws. His best of the three, 45.75m, was enough to give him first place. Then, two weeks later in Cardiff, he threw a 47.33 which pushed him up the global rankings.

In 2012, and now running with a Cheeteh Flex-Foot, Moorhouse was selected as part of the Great Britain team to compete in the 2012 Summer Paralympics in the F42 javelin. He made the final, but despite a season's best of 45.30m he finished seventh.
