= Ronald Hertog =

Dutch Paralympic athlete (born 1989)

Personal information
- Born: 13 January 1989 (age 37) Netherlands

Sport
- Country: Netherlands
- Sport: Athletics
- Disability: T44/F44
- Event(s): Javelin throw, Long jump, 100m
Medal record
Men's Paralympic athletics
Representing Netherlands
Paralympic Games
Silver medal – second place	2016 Rio de Janeiro	long jump F44
Bronze medal – third place	2012 London	Javelin throw F44

Ronald Hertog (born 13 January 1989 in Moordrecht, now merged into Zuidplas) is a Dutch amputee and Paralympic javelin thrower. He was selected to be his nation's flag-bearer at the 2012 Summer Paralympics.
