= Damien Bowen =

Australian seated shot putter and seated javelin thrower

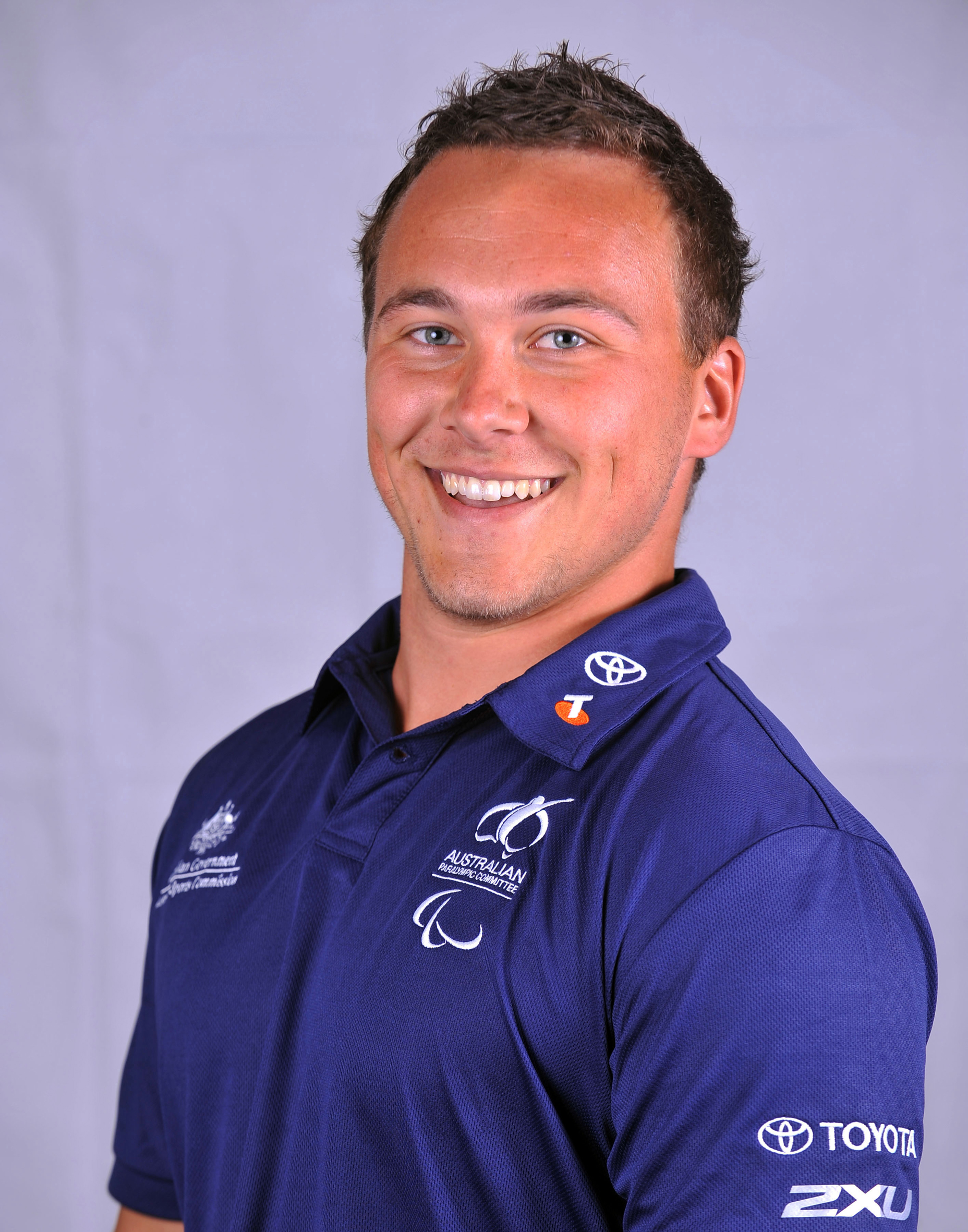
- 2012 Australian Paralympic team portrait of Bowen

Personal information
- Nationality: Australian
- Born: 14 May 1984 (age 42)

Sport
- Country: Australia
- Sport: Paralympic athletics
- Event: Shot put
- Club: Queanbeyan Athletics Club

Damien Bowen (born 14 May 1984) is an Australian seated shot putter and seated javelin thrower. He represented Australia in athletics at the 2012 Summer Paralympics but did not medal.

== Personal ==
Bowen was born on 14 May 1984 in Perth, Western Australia. As of 2012, he lives in Queanbeyan, New South Wales and is from the Australian Capital Territory. Bowen has cerebral palsy.

== Athletics ==
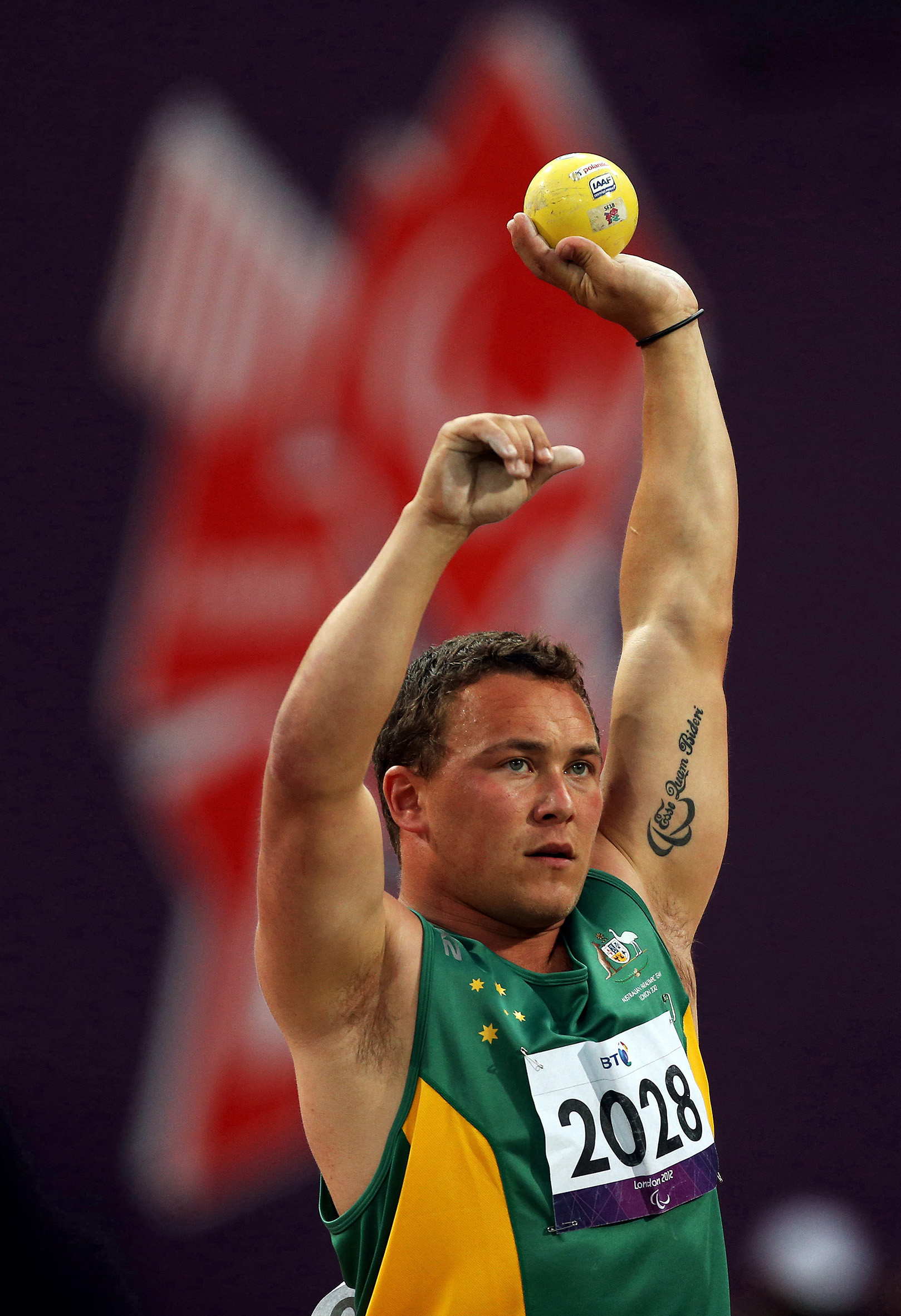
Bowen throwing the shot put at the 2012 London Paralympics

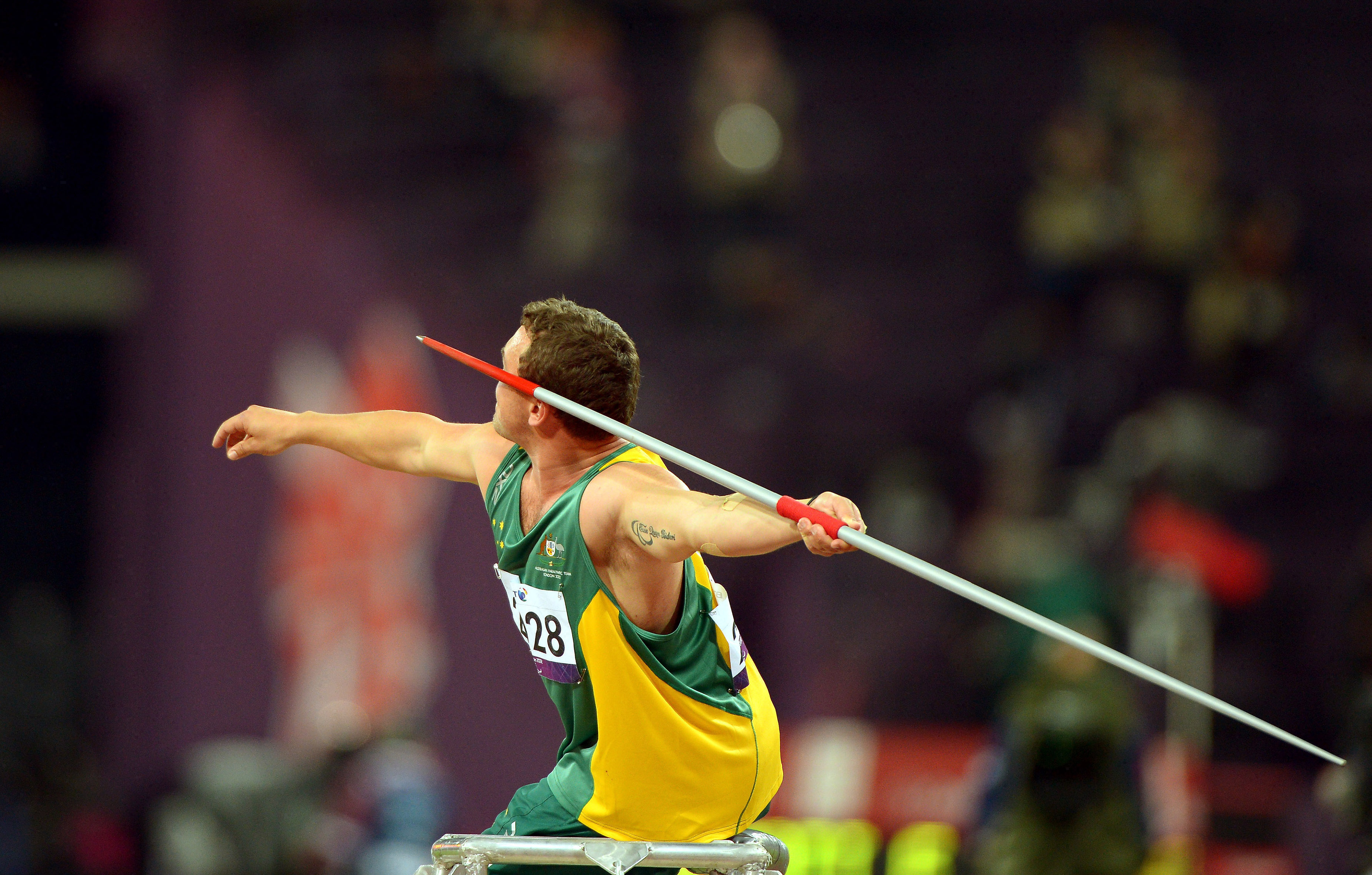
Bowen throwing the javelin at the 2012 London Paralympics

Bowen is a seated shot putter and seated javelin thrower. He competes in the F34 classification. He is coached by Alison O'Riordan, and is a member of the Queanbeyan Athletics Club. He became involved in athletics while living in Western Australia. In 2008, Bowen had a scholarship with the Australian Institute of Sport. In 2009, he had an "Aspire to be a Champion" grant. In 2011, he had a scholarship with the ACT Academy of Sport.

Bowen started in athletics in 2006. He competed at the 2008 Summer Olympics, finishing seventh in the F33/34/52 men's javelin event. He finished seventh in the javelin event. In 2009, he finished first in the mixed seated discus at the AWD Australia Athletics Championships. At the 2010 Commonwealth Games, he competed in the men's F32/34/52 shot put for elite athletes with a disability event, where he finished fourth. At the 2011 Australian Athletics Championships, he finished second in the shot put even with a throw of 9.35 metres. He finished first in the javelin event with a throw of 29.19 metres. At the 2012 Australian Athletics Championships, he finished first in the shot put event with a distance of 10.32 metres and first in the javelin event with a throw of 33.50 metres. He was selected to represent Australia at the 2012 Summer Paralympics in athletics. He did not medal at the 2012 Games.
