= Evgeny Gudkov =

Russian Paralympic athlete

Medal record

Paralympic athletics

Representing Russia

Paralympic Games
Silver medal – second place	2008 Beijing	Javelin Throw – F42/44

Evgeny Gudkov is a Paralympian athlete from Russia competing mainly in category F44 javelin events.

Evgeny won a silver medal in the 2008 Summer Paralympics in the F42/44 javelin, this was after competing in the 2004 Summer Paralympics in the F44/46 discus and javelin.
