= Georgios Karaminas =

Greek Paralympic athlete

Medal record

Paralympic athletics

Representing Greece

Paralympic Games
Silver medal – second place	2004 Athens	Shot put - F52

Georgios Karaminas is a Paralympic athlete from Greece who competes mainly in category F52 shot put events.

Karaminas has competed in the shot put and javelin at every Paralympics between 1992 and 2008, but it was in the shot put in 2004 that he won his only medal, a silver.
