= Nathan Stephens =

Welsh Paralympic athlete

Personal information
- Born: 11 April 1988 (age 38) Kenfig Hill, Wales

Sport
- Country: Great Britain
- Sport: Athletics
- Disability class: F57
- Event: Javelin throw
- Club: UWIC
- Coached by: Anthony Hughes

Achievements and titles
- Paralympic finals: 2006 Winter; 2008 Summer; 2012 Summer
- Personal best: Javelin: 41.37m

Nathan Stephens (born 11 April 1988) is a Welsh former Paralympian athlete competing mainly in category F57–58 throwing events. He was until September 2012 the world record holder in the F57 javelin throw.

== Life and sports ==
Stephens was born in Kenfig Hill in Bridgend, South Wales. At the age of nine an accident on a railway line resulted in the loss of both of his legs. He started swimming for the Dragons Disabled Swimming Club before moving on to other sports. As a youth he joined the Cardiff Huskies ice sledge hockey team, which led to an interest in sport. He began competing in athletic competitions in 2003 at the age of 15, winning the gold in discus, javelin and shot put at the Junior British Championship. He continued his success into the senior field and at the age of 16 he broke the British senior record in all three throwing events. In 2006 he took part in his first Paralympics when he represented the Great Britain ice sledge hockey team at the 2006 Winter Paralympics, having represented the team at both the 2004 IPC Ice Sledge Hockey World Championships and the 2005 IPC Ice Sledge Hockey European Championships.

Stephens competed in three events in the 2008 Summer Paralympics, finishing 11th in discus, 8th in shot put and 4th in the javelin. In 2011, Stephens won the gold at the Paralympic Athletics World Championships in New Zealand, recording a lifetime best of 39.11 metres in the javelin. He followed this up by recording a world record, at the Czech Athletics Open in Olomouc, in the men's F57 javelin with a distance of 41.37 metres.

In April 2012 he qualified in the javelin for the 2012 Summer Paralympics and was selected by sponsors as an ambassador for the British team. Expectations were high for Stephens going into the games as World champion, but his throwing style was judged illegal and he was red flagged on his first two throws. His final throw was poor and he finished 10th in his event, failing to qualify for the final round. Stephens later complained that in the previous 2011 World Championships his action was deemed legal, and was deeply unhappy at the official's decision. The London games also saw him lose his world record to Brazilian athlete Claudiney Batista dos Santos, who recorded a distance of 45.38 metres.

He competed at the 2018 Commonwealth Games where he came 10th in the lightweight event.

== Personal life ==
In 2012 he married Charlene Stephens, using prosthetics to dance with her and walk down the aisle.
