= Athletics at the 2016 Summer Paralympics – Men's discus throw =

The men's discus throw athletics events for the 2016 Summer Paralympics took place at the Rio Olympic Stadium on 9 September. A total of five events were contested for eight different classifications.

== Schedule ==
F	Final

Event↓/Date →	Thu 8	Fri 9	Sat 10	Sun 11	Mon 12	Tue 13	Wed 14	Thu 15	Fri 16	Sat 17
T11					F					
T37	F									
T44									F	
T52	F									
T56			F							

== Medal summary ==
Classification	Gold		Silver		Bronze	
F11	Alessandro Rodrigo Silva; Brazil	43.06	Oney Tapia; Italy	40.89	David Casinos Sierra; Spain	38.58
F37	Khusniddin Norbekov; Uzbekistan	59.75	Mindaugas Bilius; Lithuania	53.50	Xia Dong; China	52.15
F44	David Blair; United States	64.11	Akeem Stewart; Trinidad and Tobago	61.72	Dan Greaves; Great Britain	59.57
F52	Aigars Apinis; Latvia	20.83	Robert Jachimowicz; Poland	19.10	Velimir Šandor; Croatia	18.24
F56	Claudiney Batista dos Santos; Brazil	45.33	Alireza Ghaleh Nasseri; Iran	44.04	Leonardo Diaz; Cuba	43.58

== Competition format ==
The competition for each classification consisted of a single round. Each athlete threw three times, after which the eight best threw three more times (with the best distance of the six throws counted).

== Results ==
=== F11 ===
The F11 event took place on 9 September.

Rank	Athlete	Nationality	1	2	3	4	5	6	Best	Notes
1st place, gold medalist(s)	Alessandro Rodrigo Silva	Brazil	30.61	34.75	43.06	40.47	41.81	28.43	43.06	PR
2nd place, silver medalist(s)	Oney Tapia	Italy	40.89	x	x	38.23	38.86	39.03	40.89	
3rd place, bronze medalist(s)	David Casinos	Spain	35.74	38.78	36.72	35.65	34.63	x	38.78	SB
4	Bil Marinkovic	Austria	36.66	x	37.22	x	x	36.32	37.22	SB
5	Marcio Silva Braga Leite	Brazil	34.07	34.71	34.43	33.46	31.54	34.43	34.71	
6	Sergio Paz	Argentina	33.64	33.99	x	32.01	33.10	30.51	33.99	
7	Mirosław Madzia	Poland	30.19	32.32	31.26	32.00	32.50	x	32.50	
8	Yasser Satouri	Tunisia	30.77	x	29.57	27.53	29.61	29.20	30.77	
9	Friday Aibangbe	Nigeria	x	22.49	30.02				30.02	

=== F37 ===
The F37 event took place on 14 September.

Rank	Athlete	Nationality	1	2	3	4	5	6	Best	Notes
1st place, gold medalist(s)	Khusniddin Norbekov	Uzbekistan	54.46	59.75	54.89	57.19	x	54.61	59.71	WR
2nd place, silver medalist(s)	Mindaugas Bilius	Lithuania	45.72	x	48.43	52.34	53.50	53.04	53.50	PB
3rd place, bronze medalist(s)	Xia Dong	China	48.35	51.51	52.15	51.41	x	x	52.15	SB
4	Guy Henly	Australia	48.28	50.15	45.00	47.80	51.97	51.54	51.97	
5	Ronni Jensen	Denmark	x	45.44	48.00	48.10	47.71	x	48.10	
6	Mohamed Mohamed Ramadan	Egypt	44.95	45.41	x	x	46.91	47.97	47.97	
7	João Victor Teixeira de Souza Silva	Brazil	x	43.71	45.10	41.94	44.97	x	45.10	PB
8	Tomasz Blatkiewicz	Poland	40.62	42.38	44.26	44.00	43.54	44.23	44.26	
9	Kevin Strybosch	Canada	x	41.81	x				41.81	
10	Mykola Zhabnyak	Ukraine	40.37	41.39	x				41.39	
11	Shahrad Nasajpour	Individual Paralympic Athletes	x	39.64	39.49				39.64	SB
12	Alefosio Laki	Samoa	33.53	x	x				33.53	PB

=== F44 ===
The F44 event took place on 11 September.

Rank	Athlete	Nationality	Class	1	2	3	4	5	6	Best	Notes
1st place, gold medalist(s)	David Blair	United States	F44	58.65	x	64.11	63.21	x	x	64.11	WR
2nd place, silver medalist(s)	Akeem Stewart	Trinidad and Tobago	F43	56.03	61.70	60.83	60.82	60.53	61.72	61.72	PR
3rd place, bronze medalist(s)	Dan Greaves	Great Britain	F44	57.40	58.63	59.57	x	59.05	58.20	59.57	
4	Jeremy Campbell	United States	F44	x	52.44	54.80	56.03	54.06	x	56.03	
5	Ivan Katanušić	Croatia	F44	x	x	46.97	47.37	55.36	55.22	55.36	
6	Adrián Matušík	Slovakia	F44	x	48.55	53.20	48.90	51.18	52.88	53.20	SB
7	Josip Slivar	Croatia	F44	46.37	x	42.12	45.09	47.39	x	47.39	
8	Egert Jõesaar	Estonia	F44	44.78	45.18	44.55	x	x	46.61	46.61	
9	Bardy Chris Bouésso	Republic of the Congo	F44	x	20.38	18.95				20.38	PB
	Gerdan Fonseca	Cuba	F44							DNS	

=== F52 ===
The F52 event took place on 14 September.

Rank	Athlete	Nationality	Class	1	2	3	4	5	6	Best	Notes
1st place, gold medalist(s)	Aigars Apinis	Latvia	F52	19.90	20.02	20.83	17.80	20.05	20.35	20.83	SB
2nd place, silver medalist(s)	Robert Jachimowicz	Poland	F52	17.87	18.39	19.10	x	15.97	x	19.10	
3rd place, bronze medalist(s)	Velimir Šandor	Croatia	F52	17.70	17.67	18.24	17.62	17.29	x	18.24	
4	Kęstutis Skučas	Lithuania	F52	x	x	x	16.18	16.84	17.08	17.08	PB
5	Adrian Imianowski	Poland	F52	16.33	15.97	15.89	16.05	16.21	x	16.33	PB
6	Erik Alejandro de Santos Espinosa	Mexico	F52	15.38	15.59	14.93	15.27	14.59	15.37	15.59	
7	Amit Kumar Kumar	India	F51	x	x	x	9.01	x	8.75	9.01	

=== F56 ===
The F56 event took place on 17 September.

Rank	Athlete	Nationality	Class	1	2	3	4	5	6	Best	Notes
1st place, gold medalist(s)	Claudiney Batista dos Santos	Brazil	F56	42.03	45.33	44.66	x	–	–	45.33	PR, AR
2nd place, silver medalist(s)	Alireza Ghaleh Nasseri	Iran	F56	42.32	42.12	43.86	40.24	42.26	44.04	44.04	PB
3rd place, bronze medalist(s)	Leonardo Diaz	Cuba	F56	42.14	43.53	43.58	39.90	x	37.01	43.58	
4	Olokhan Musayev	Azerbaijan	F56	40.07	40.93	39.60	38.58	40.35	39.93	40.93	SB
5	Ibrahim Ibrahim	Egypt	F56	37.80	36.58	39.81	x	x	x	39.81	SB
6	Ruzhdi Ruzhdi	Bulgaria	F55	35.13	38.04	x	36.48	37.13	36.80	38.04	PR
7	Nebojša Đurić	Serbia	F55	36.75	x	x	34.02	35.32	35.58	36.75	
8	Johnnie Williams	United States	F56	34.05	35.10	28.78	32.19	34.68	29.17	35.10	
9	Ricardo Robles de la Torre	Mexico	F56	32.35	33.91	33.52				33.91	
10	Ignas Madumla Mtweve	Tanzania	F56	19.66	22.09	22.91				22.91	PB
	Ali Mohammadyari	Iran	F56	x	x	x				NM	
