= 2018 World Para Athletics European Championships – Men's discus throw =

The men's discus throw at the 2018 World Para Athletics European Championships was held at the Friedrich-Ludwig-Jahn-Sportpark in Berlin from 20 to 26 August. Seven classification finals are held in all over this event.

== Medalists ==
Event	Gold		Silver		Bronze	
F11	Oney Tapia (ITA)	46.07 WR	Bil Marinkovic (AUT)	35.65	Dusko Sretenovic (SRB)	34.20
F12	Marek Wietecki (POL)	45.42	Kim Lopez Gonzalez (ESP)	40.85	Stefan Dimitrijevic (SRB)	38.92
F37	Mykola Zhabnyak (UKR)	49.83	Ronni Jensen (DEN)	43.64	Apostolos Charitonidis (GRE)	43.61
F52	Piotr Kosewicz (POL)	20.20 CR	Aigars Apinis (LAT)	19.71	Robert Jachimowicz (POL)	19.19
F56	Nebojša Đurić (SRB)	39.84	Olokhan Musayev (AZE)	37.92	Ruzhdi Ruzhdi (BUL)	35.80
F63	Aled Davies (GBR)	50.55 CR	Tom Habscheid (LUX)	46.22	Badr Touzi (FRA)	41.88
F64	Dan Greaves (GBR)	57.65	Ivan Katanušić (CRO)	54.92	Adrian Matusik (SVK)	50.09
WR world record | AR area record | CR championship record | GR games record | NR national record | OR Olympic record | PB personal best | SB season best | WL world leading (in a given season)

== See also ==
- List of IPC world records in athletics

== See also ==
- List of IPC world records in athletics
