= 2011 IPC Athletics World Championships – Men's discus throw =

The men's discus throw at the 2011 IPC Athletics World Championships was held at the QEII Stadium from 22 to 28 January.

In the Men's discus throw F42, held on January 27, the Gold was originally won by Fanie Lombaard of South Africa. However, he tested positive for Probenecid in a urine sample provided on 27 January 2011. The prohibited substance had been prescribed to him because of a medical problem, but he did not have a Therapeutic Use Exemption (TUE). The International Paralympic Committee (IPC) suspended him for a year (from January 27), and fined him 1,500 euros. The IPC redistributed the medals.

== Medalists ==
Class	Gold	Silver	Bronze
F11	David Casinos; Spain	Vasyl Lishchynskyi; Ukraine	Bil Marinkovic; Austria
F12	Oleksandr Iasynovyi; Ukraine	Vladimir Andryushchenko; Russia	Kim Lopez Gonzalez; Spain
F32/33/34	Lahouari Bahlaz; Algeria	Frantisek Serbus; Czech Republic	Jalal Khakzadieh; Iran
F35/36	Pawel Piotrowski; Poland	Reginald Benade; Namibia	Volodymyr Zhaivoronok; Ukraine
F37/38	Tomasz Blatkiewicz; Poland	Mykola Zhabnyak; Ukraine	Javad Hardani; Iran
F40	Paschalis Stathelakos; Greece	Jonathan de Souza Santos; Brazil	Scott Danberg; United States
F42	Gino de Keersmaeker; Belgium	Aled Davies; Great Britain	Marinos Fylachtos; Greece
F44	Daniel Greaves; Great Britain	Jeremy Campbell; United States	Farzad Sepahvand; Iran
F46	Tomasz Rebisz; Poland	Chunliang Guo; China	Joao Santos; Brazil
F51/52/53	Aigars Apinis; Latvia	Joze Flere; Slovenia	Yassen Mohammad; Jordan
F54/55/56	Leonardo Diaz; Cuba	Draženko Mitrović; Serbia	Mustafa Yuseinov; Bulgaria
F57/58	Alexey Ashapatov; Russia	Metawa Abo Elkhir; Egypt	Ali Ghardooni; Germany

== F11 ==
The Men's discus throw, F11 was held on January 22

F11 = visual impairment: from no light perception in either eye, to light perception but with the inability to recognise the shape of a hand at any distance or in any direction.

=== Results ===
==== Final ====
Rank	Athlete	Nationality	#1	#2	#3	#4	#5	#6	Result	Notes
1st place, gold medalist(s)	David Casinos	Spain	39.33	x	x	37.29	x	40.89	40.89	
2nd place, silver medalist(s)	Vasyl Lishchynskyi	Ukraine	36.64	5.58	36.42	30.03	37.79	36.44	37.79	
3rd place, bronze medalist(s)	Bil Marinkovic	Austria	x	34.20	34.53	36.70	33.92	34.83	36.70	
4	Sergio Paz	Argentina	33.32	x	34.43	x	x	32.27	34.43	
5	Miroslaw Madzia	Poland	31.46	31.21	x	x	32.39	x	32.39	
6	G. E Rodriguez	Colombia	28.72	x	27.67	30.82	24.97	32.04	32.04	
7	Hameed Hassain	Iraq	29.21	x	25.83	29.15	27.56	29.60	29.60	
8	Nelson Goncalves	Portugal	27.16	27.76	27.46	28.53	28.30	29.43	29.43	
9	Yudong Bae	South Korea	25.47	27.64	x				27.64	
10	Yuriy Piskov	Ukraine	x	24.39	x				24.39	

== F12 ==
The Men's discus throw, F12 was held on January 28

F12 = visual impairment: may recognise the shape of a hand, have a visual acuity of 2/60 and/or visual field of less than 5 degrees.

=== Results ===
==== Final ====
Rank	Athlete	Nationality	#1	#2	#3	#4	#5	#6	Result	Notes
1st place, gold medalist(s)	Oleksandr Iasynovyi	Ukraine	47.15	x	48.11	48.61	44.74	48.04	48.61	SB
2nd place, silver medalist(s)	Vladimir Andryushchenko	Russia	43.63	43.96	40.36	x	42.03	39.69	43.96	
3rd place, bronze medalist(s)	Kim Lopez Gonzalez	Spain	41.35	43.63	42.39	x	41.87	x	43.63	SB
4	Russell Short	Australia	38.50	38.34	40.58	40.40	38.05	38.02	40.58	
5	Rolandas Urbonas	Lithuania	x	32.39	34.45	x	16.89	39.22	39.22	
6	Francois Badenhorst	South Africa	32.95	33.72	32.63	34.72	31.30	x	34.72	
7	Mahdi Al-Saadi	Iraq	29.14	x	x	30.40	x	28.81	30.40	

Key: SB = Season Best

== F32/33/34 ==
The Men's discus throw, F32/33/34 was held on January 24 and the medal ceremony on January 25

F32/33/34

- F32 = poor functional strength in arms, legs and trunk, able to propel a wheelchair. Compete in a wheelchair, may throw a discus from a throwing frame.
- F33 = some degree of trunk movement when pushing a wheelchair, forward trunk movement limited during forceful pushing. Throwing movements mainly from the arm. Compete in a wheelchair or from a throwing frame.
- F34 = demonstrates good functional strength, minimal limitation or control problems in arms or trunk. Compete in a wheelchair or from a throwing frame.

=== Results ===
==== Final ====
Rank	Athlete	Nationality	#1	#2	#3	#4	#5	#6	Result	Points	Notes
1st place, gold medalist(s)	Lahouari Bahlaz	Algeria	16.53	17.56	20.30	18.77	18.62	17.36	20.30	1020	WR
2nd place, silver medalist(s)	Frantisek Serbus	Czech Republic	18.47	17.38	x	18.24	17.64	20.19	20.19	1014	AR
3rd place, bronze medalist(s)	Jalal Khakzadieh	Iran	34.60	37.72	37.65	37.06	x	39.44	39.44	994	
4	Miloslav Bardiovsky	Slovakia	19.52	x	x	13.93	11.58	x	19.52	977	SB
5	Kamel Kardjena	Algeria	x	x	28.42	x	x	x	28.42	977	CR
6	Siamak Saleh Farajzadeh	Iran	x	35.52	36.99	37.96	x	x	37.96	952	SB
7	Kieran Tscherniawsky	Great Britain	26.50	27.20	x	26.99	x	27.52	27.52	942	
8	Thierry Cibone	France	x	35.85	28.93	32.59	34.11	x	35.85	889	
9	Hani Alnakhli	Saudi Arabia	25.85	23.77	24.32				25.85	872	
10	Ahmed Alhousani	United Arab Emirates	x	x	23.83				23.83	782	SB
11	Karim Bettina	Algeria	x	x	16.04				16.04	760	
12	Faouzi Rzig	Tunisia	27.91	29.57	30.63				30.63	715	
13	Daniel West	Great Britain	29.85	25.17	x				29.85	688	
14	Chris Martin	Great Britain	x	21.58	x				21.58	675	
15	Roman Musil	Czech Republic	27.35	23.53	26.51				27.35	598	
16	Sam Craven	United States	x	26.35	24.67				26.35	562	
17	Mourad Idoudi	Tunisia	15.98	18.03	x				18.03	499	
	Mohamed Ali Krid	Tunisia	x	x	x				NM		

Key: WR = World Record, CR = Championship Record, AR = Area Record, SB = Season Best, PB = Personal Best, NM = No Mark

== F35/36 ==
The Men's discus throw, F35/36 was held on January 28

F35/36

- F35 = good static balance, problems in dynamic balance. A shift of centre of gravity may lead to loss of balance, may have sufficient lower extremity function to execute a run up when throwing.
- F36 = able to walk without assistance or assistive devices, more control problems with upper than lower limbs. All four limbs are involved, dynamic is often better than static balance. Hand control, grasp and release affected when throwing.

=== Results ===
==== Final ====
Rank	Athlete	Nationality	#1	#2	#3	#4	#5	#6	Result	Points	Notes
1st place, gold medalist(s)	Pawel Piotrowski	Poland	35.68	x	x	33.64	x	38.65	38.65	1004	CR
2nd place, silver medalist(s)	Reginald Benade	Namibia	x	38.37	x	32.72	x	x	38.37	997	AR
3rd place, bronze medalist(s)	Volodymyr Zhaivoronok	Ukraine	35.10	36.10	35.66	x	34.28	38.09	38.09	990	SB
4	Duane Strydom	South Africa	37.53	36.67	33.99	x	33.97	34.21	37.53	976	SB
5	Sebastian Dietz	Germany	35.56	35.55	34.48	x	37.31	37.38	37.38	972	SB
6	Wenbo Wang	China	25.56	34.20	7.04	36.50	32.89	29.24	36.50	949	SB
7	Albin Vidović	Croatia	33.35	25.92	31.87	28.85	x	x	33.35	856	
8	Guo Wei	China	x	39.29	x	x	38.83	38.72	39.29	663	
9	Edgards Bergs	Latvia	30.36	28.77	33.83				33.83	509	
	Paulo Souza	Brazil	x	x	x				NM		

Key: CR = Championship Record, AR = Area Record, SB = Season Best, NM = No Mark

== F37/38 ==
The Men's discus throw, F37/38 was held on January 23 with the medal ceremony on January 24

F37/38

- F37 = spasticity in an arm and leg on the same side, good functional ability on the non impaired side, better development, good arm and hand control and follow through.
- F38 = must meet the minimum disability criteria for athletes with cerebral palsy, head injury or stroke. A limitation in function that impacts on sports performance.

=== Results ===
==== Final ====
Rank	Athlete	Nationality	#1	#2	#3	#4	#5	#6	Result	Points	Notes
1st place, gold medalist(s)	Tomasz Blatkiewicz	Poland	51.47	47.34	x	51.48	53.00	47.90	53.00	1003	WR
2nd place, silver medalist(s)	Mykola Zhabnyak	Ukraine	47.67	42.95	x	x	52.48	x	52.48	999	SB
3rd place, bronze medalist(s)	Javad Hardani	Iran	46.53	45.72	x	x	43.86	45.75	46.53	985	CR
4	Ronni Jensen	Denmark	34.31	x	45.56	47.04	45.06	x	47.04	955	SB
5	Khusniddin Norbekov	Uzbekistan	46.59	45.14	x	43.56	x	x	46.59	950	
6	Mohamed Mohamed Ramadan	Egypt	45.60	x	44.74	x	45.69	46.22	46.22	946	
7	Xuelong Zhang	China	44.77	43.51	x	44.40	-	-	44.77	929	SB
8	Oleksandr Doroshenko	Ukraine	41.28	38.79	x	x	x	x	41.28	929	
9	Gerrit Johannes Kruger	South Africa	43.76	43.66	43.61				43.76	916	
10	Timo Mustikkamaa	Finland	35.89	38.89	x				38.89	834	
	Juanre Jenkinson	South Africa	x	x	-				NM		

Key: WR = World Record, CR = Championship Record, SB = Season Best, NM = No Mark

== F40 ==
The Men's discus throw, F40 was held on January 24

F40 = dwarfism.

=== Results ===
==== Final ====
Rank	Athlete	Nationality	#1	#2	#3	#4	#5	#6	Result	Notes
1st place, gold medalist(s)	Paschalis Stathelakos	Greece	38.62	38.90	38.94	40.92	35.90	x	40.92	WR
2nd place, silver medalist(s)	Jonathan de Souza Santos	Brazil	39.11	38.25	33.95	39.31	38.13	37.79	39.31	
3rd place, bronze medalist(s)	Scott Danberg	United States	31.73	35.82	33.42	33.55	36.18	33.81	36.18	SB
4	Alexandros Michail Konstantinidis	Greece	33.32	31.91	35.35	x	27.66	33.92	35.35	
5	Hocine Gherzouli	Algeria	27.64	30.39	x	x	29.12	30.61	30.61	AR
6	Chengcheng Fan	China	29.32	30.34	29.54	29.75	29.05	29.24	30.34	AR
7	Kovan Abdulraheem	Iraq	26.44	27.70	29.28	28.28	x	27.84	29.28	SB
8	Zhiwei Xia	China	x	x	29.15	28.06	x	29.13	29.15	SB
09	Rachid Rachad Rachid	Morocco	27.02	21.52	x				27.02	
10	Wildan Nukhailawi	Iraq	x	26.97	x				26.97	
11	Noureldeen Aladeely	Jordan	21.05	21.78	21.63				21.78	SB
12	Mohamed El Garaa	Morocco	x	21.33	21.31				21.33	

Key: WR = World Record, SB = Season Best, AR = Area Record

== F42 ==
The Men's discus throw, F42 was held on January 27. The Gold was originally won by Fanie Lombaard of South Africa. However, he tested positive for Probenecid in a urine sample provided on 27 January 2011. The prohibited substance had been prescribed to him because of a medical problem, but he did not have a Therapeutic Use Exemption (TUE). The International Paralympic Committee (IPC) suspended him for a year (from January 27), and fined him 1,500 euros.

The IPC upgraded Keersmaeker, Davies and Fylachtos to gold, silver and bronze respectively.

F42 = single above knee amputation or equivalent impairments.

=== Results ===
==== Final ====
Rank	Athlete	Nationality	#1	#2	#3	#4	#5	#6	Result	Notes
DSQ	Fanie Lombaard	South Africa	x	40.29	41.89	x	42.03	x	~~42.03~~	SB
1st place, gold medalist(s)	Gino de Keersmaeker	Belgium	38.79	40.03	39.20	41.70	40.63	38.34	41.70	
2nd place, silver medalist(s)	Aled Davies	Great Britain	38.90	37.86	38.53	41.45	x	41.56	41.56	
3rd place, bronze medalist(s)	Marinos Fylachtos	Greece	39.89	41.23	40.18	39.71	40.34	40.60	41.23	SB
4	Dechko Ovcharov	Bulgaria	x	37.90	38.52	35.35	x	38.96	38.96	SB
	Ali Ali	Saudi Arabia							DNS	

Key: SB = Season Best, DNS = Did not Start

== F44 ==
The Men's discus throw, F44 was held on January 26

F44 = single below knee amputation or equivalent impairments.

=== Results ===
==== Final ====
Rank	Athlete	Nationality	#1	#2	#3	#4	#5	#6	Result	Notes
1st place, gold medalist(s)	Daniel Greaves	Great Britain	53.83	x	x	58.98	58.18	x	58.98	WR
2nd place, silver medalist(s)	Jeremy Campbell	United States	51.68	x	53.37	53.40	50.21	x	53.40	
3rd place, bronze medalist(s)	Farzad Sepahvand	Iran	47.11	50.98	x	52.59	53.12	x	53.12	SB
4	Jackie Christiansen	Denmark	x	47.50	x	x	x	51.25	51.25	SB
5	Adrian Matusik	Slovakia	x	37.10	45.96	46.09	42.93	47.40	47.40	
6	Alexander Filatov	Russia	42.92	40.31	x	x	44.93	43.40	44.93	SB
7	Josip Slivar	Croatia	x	35.72	43.06	x	38.86	x	43.06	SB
8	Miltiadis Kyriakidis	Greece	39.52	x	x	x	39.58	37.42	39.58	
9	Mingjie Gao	China	38.32	39.13	38.42				39.13	
10	Tony Falelavaki	France	36.40	35.69	36.03				36.40	

Key: WR = World Record, SB = Season Best

== F46 ==
The Men's discus throw, F46 was held on January 25

F46 = single above or below elbow amputation, or equivalent impairments.

=== Results ===
==== Final ====
Rank	Athlete	Nationality	#1	#2	#3	#4	#5	#6	Result	Notes
1st place, gold medalist(s)	Tomasz Rebisz	Poland	46.40	x	x	44.21	47.44	47.04	47.44	CR
2nd place, silver medalist(s)	Chunliang Guo	China	43.09	45.09	x	x	44.64	44.80	45.09	SB
3rd place, bronze medalist(s)	João Santos	Brazil	43.86	41.62	45.08	x	43.44	45.05	45.08	AR
4	Zhanbiao Hou	China	42.32	x	42.07	x	44.21	45.01	45.01	
5	Enlong Wei	China	44.58	43.94	x	x	44.48	x	44.58	
6	Maamar Meskine	Algeria	x	x	x	42.91	41.63	42.62	42.91	AR
7	Nikita Prokhorov	Russia	39.13	40.44	x	38.46	40.70	x	40.70	
8	Soselito Sekeme	France	34.81	40.05	36.37	37.32	39.17	37.04	40.05	SB

Key: CR = Championship Record, SB = Season Best, AR = Area Record

== F51/52/53 ==
The Men's discus throw, F51/52/53 was held on January 27

F51/52/53

- F51 = a weakness in shoulder function, the ability to bend but not straighten the elbow joint, no trunk or leg function, no movement in the fingers, can bend the wrists backwards but not forwards.
- F52 = good shoulder, elbow and wrist function, poor to normal finger flexion and extension, no trunk or leg function.
- F53 = normal upper limb function, no abdominal, leg or lower spinal function.

=== Results ===
==== Final ====
Rank	Athlete	Nationality	#1	#2	#3	#4	#5	#6	Result	Points	Notes
1st place, gold medalist(s)	Aigars Apinis	Latvia	20.88	17.64	20.08	-	-	-	20.88	998	WR
2nd place, silver medalist(s)	Joze Flere	Slovenia	x	10.06	10.23	8.97	x	x	10.23	791	CR
3rd place, bronze medalist(s)	Yassen Mohammad	Jordan	15.31	18.18	17.77	17.66	18.18	17.58	18.18	739	AR
4	Pantelis Kalogeros	Greece	9.34	9.61	9.86	9.48	x	8.73	9.86	727	
5	Carlos Leon	United States	18.97	16.54	22.13	20.88	22.03	22.59	22.59	703	SB
6	Garrett Culliton	Ireland	17.33	17.49	17.05	15.54	16.11	x	17.49	675	
7	Scott Severn	United States	21.32	22.03	21.87	17.04	20.86	21.65	22.03	663	
8	Miroslav Matic	Croatia	8.42	8.43	7.95	x	x	8.87	8.87	564	
9	Lakhdar Sahli	Algeria	11.39	12.90	13.43				13.43	342	AR

Key: WR = World Record, AR = Area Record, SB = Season Best

== F54/55/56 ==
The Men's discus throw, F54/55/56 was held on January 28

F54/55/56

- F54 = normal upper limb function, no abdominal or lower spinal function.
- F55 = normal upper limb function, may have partial to almost normal trunk function, no leg function.
- F56 = normal upper limb and trunk function, some leg function, may have high bilateral above knee amputation.

=== Results ===
==== Final ====
Rank	Athlete	Nationality	#1	#2	#3	#4	#5	#6	Result	Points	Notes
1st place, gold medalist(s)	Leonardo Diaz	Cuba	42.22	39.44	38.20	41.42	43.10	42.78	43.10	1030	WR
2nd place, silver medalist(s)	Drazenko Mitrovic	Serbia	30.37	31.35	26.66	31.26	30.56	31.10	31.35	1027	WR
3rd place, bronze medalist(s)	Mustafa Yuseinov	Bulgaria	x	35.20	39.42	30.86	36.57	38.37	39.42	1002	WR
4	Ali Mohammad Yari	Iran	35.34	31.32	37.28	39.71	39.85	41.10	41.10	1000	AR
5	Alexey Kuznetsov	Russia	26.53	27.99	25.05	28.18	26.60	26.99	28.18	954	
6	Martin Němec	Czech Republic	31.58	34.47	32.77	35.22	35.01	36.01	36.01	936	
7	Gang Li	China	30.47	32.39	33.51	31.62	30.86	32.84	33.51	876	
8	Josef Stiak	Czech Republic	33.15	x	30.67	x	33.00	33.99	33.99	848	
9	Ilias Nalmpantis	Greece	28.46	30.87	30.92				30.92	801	

Key: WR = World Record, AR = Area Record

== F57/58 ==
The Men's discus throw, F57/58 was held on January 26

F57/58

- F57 = normal upper limb and trunk function, may have bilateral above knee amputations.
- F58 = normal upper limb and trunk function, bilateral below knee amputation or single above knee amputation.

=== Results ===
==== Final ====
Rank	Athlete	Nationality	#1	#2	#3	#4	#5	#6	Result	Points	Notes
1st place, gold medalist(s)	Alexey Ashapatov	Russia	56.89	49.75	52.36	x	52.44	57.64	57.64	1000	WR
2nd place, silver medalist(s)	Metawa Abo Elkhir	Egypt	49.01	47.67	54.96	51.06	54.80	54.76	54.96	957	SB
3rd place, bronze medalist(s)	Ali Ghardooni	Germany	39.97	43.93	41.92	x	43.15	44.29	44.29	912	
4	Rostislav Pohlmann	Czech Republic	34.71	41.85	40.01	39.23	41.63	44.16	44.16	909	
5	Issa Saif Hamdan Al Jahwari	United Arab Emirates	x	43.21	42.89	39.58	x	x	43.21	887	
6	Mahmoud Ramadan El Attar	Egypt	49.85	x	44.67	47.32	x	x	49.85	861	SB
7	Dennis Ogbe	United States	x	43.11	46.04	43.31	46.82	42.61	46.82	794	
8	Pasilione Tafilagi	France	x	44.46	36.32	x	x	41.32	44.46	738	
9	Nasser Saed Alsahoti	Qatar	34.40	40.50	39.51				40.50	634	

Key: WR = World Record, SB = Season Best

== See also ==
- 2011 IPC Athletics World Championships – Men's pentathlon
- List of IPC world records in athletics
