= Athletics at the 2020 Summer Paralympics – Men's discus throw =

The Men's discus throw athletics events for the 2020 Summer Paralympics took place at the Tokyo National Stadium from August 29 to September 3, 2021. A total of 5 events were contested in this discipline.

== Schedule ==
R	Round 1	½	Semifinals	F	Final

Date	Sun 29		Mon 30		Tue 31		Wed 1		Thu 2		Fri 3	
Event	M	E	M	E	M	E	M	E	M	E	M	E
F11									F			
F37											F	
F52		F										
F56			F									
F64										F		

== Medal summary ==
The following is a summary of the medals awarded across all discus throw events.

Classification	Gold		Silver		Bronze	
F11	Alessandro Rodrigo da Silva; Brazil	43.16 GR	Mahdi Olad; Iran	40.60	Oney Tapia; Italy	39.52
F37	Haider Ali; Pakistan	55.26	Mykola Zhabnyak; Ukraine	52.43	João Victor Teixeira de Souza Silva; Brazil	51.86
F52	Piotr Kosewicz; Poland	20.02	Velimir Šandor; Croatia	19.98	Aigars Apinis; Latvia	19.54
F56	Claudiney Batista; Brazil	45.59 GR	Yogesh Kathuniya; India	44.38	Leonardo Díaz; Cuba	43.36
F64	Jeremy Campbell; United States	60.22	Ivan Katanušić; Croatia	55.06	Dan Greaves; Great Britain	53.56

== Results ==
=== F11 ===
Records

Prior to this competition, the existing world, Paralympic, and area records were as follows:

World record	Alessandro Rodrigo da Silva (BRA)	46.10	Dubai, United Arab Emirates	13 November 2019
Paralympic record	Alessandro Rodrigo da Silva (BRA)	43.06	Rio de Janeiro, Brazil	12 September 2016

Area	Distance (m)	Athlete	Nation
Africa	36.80	Yasser Satouri	Tunisia
America	46.10 WR	Alessandro Rodrigo da Silva	Brazil
Asia	42.37	Mahdi Olad	Iran
Europe	46.07	Oney Tapia	Italy
Oceania	18.51	Ben Theodore	Papua New Guinea

Results

The final in this classification took place on 2 September 2021, at 10:32:

Rank	Athlete	Nationality	1	2	3	4	5	6	Best	Notes
1st place, gold medalist(s)	Alessandro Rodrigo da Silva	Brazil	42.09	43.16	41.46	42.53	x	42.27	43.16	PR
2nd place, silver medalist(s)	Mahdi Olad	Iran	39.22	x	39.68	40.60	x	38.21	40.60	SB
3rd place, bronze medalist(s)	Oney Tapia	Italy	38.56	37.88	x	35.23	39.52	37.27	39.52	
4	Igor Baskakov	RPC	x	34.47	x	32.77	x	31.27	34.47	
5	Bil Marinkovic	Austria	32.91	30.46	33.45	33.39	x	x	33.45	
6	Nourmohammad Arekhi	Iran	28.78	x	30.19	x	31.77	33.37	33.37	SB
7	Álvaro del Amo Cano	Spain	x	x	31.05	x	32.71	x	32.71	
8	Sergei Shatalov	RPC	32.08	31.64	x	x	x	x	32.08	SB
9	Mirosław Madzia	Poland	x	x	29.46	Did not advance			29.46	

=== F37 ===
Records

Prior to this competition, the existing world, Paralympic, and area records were as follows:

World record	Khusniddin Norbekov (UZB)	59.75	Rio de Janeiro, Brazil	8 September 2016
Paralympic record	Khusniddin Norbekov (UZB)	59.75	Rio de Janeiro, Brazil	8 September 2016

Area	Distance (m)	Athlete	Nation
Africa	51.92	Mohamed Mohamed Ramadan	Egypt
America	52.76	João Victor Teixeira de Souza Silva	Brazil
Asia	59.75 WR	Khusniddin Norbekov	Uzbekistan
Europe	55.71	Mykola Zhabnyak	Ukraine
Oceania	53.61	Guy Henly	Australia

Results

The final in this classification took place on 3 September 2021, at 10:55:

Rank	Athlete	Nationality	1	2	3	4	5	6	Best	Notes
1st place, gold medalist(s)	Haider Ali	Pakistan	x	x	47.84	x	55.26	x	55.26	PB
2nd place, silver medalist(s)	Mykola Zhabnyak	Ukraine	48.45	x	x	52.43	x	45.53	52.43	
3rd place, bronze medalist(s)	João Victor Teixeira de Souza Silva	Brazil	x	46.94	x	48.22	51.86	49.37	51.86	
4	Guy Henly	Australia	x	40.64	x	47.29	48.14	48.72	48.72	
5	Mohamed Mohamed Ramadan	Egypt	43.14	47.13	48.38	48.03	47.04	48.55	48.55	SB
6	Edwars Alexander Varela Meza	Venezuela	x	41.20	x	46.57	42.75	x	46.57	SB
7	Donatas Dundzys	Lithuania	40.21	x	44.02	43.45	44.98	x	44.98	SB
8	Shahrad Nasajpour	Refugee Paralympic Team	x	42.25	x	42.05	x	x	42.25	

=== F52 ===
Records

Prior to this competition, the existing world, Paralympic, and area records were as follows:

World record	Andre Rocha (BRA)	23.80	London, United Kingdom	18 July 2017
Paralympic record	Aigars Apinis (LAT)	21.00	London, United Kingdom	6 September 2012

Area	Distance (m)	Athlete	Nation
Africa	12.08	Jacobus Pieters	South Africa
America	23.80 WR	Andre Rocha	Brazil
Asia	19.91	Vinod Kumar	India
Europe	21.95	Aigars Apinis	Latvia
Oceania	16.81	Rod Farr	Australia

Results

The final in this classification took place on 29 August 2021, at 19:24:

Rank	Athlete	Nationality	Class	1	2	3	4	5	6	Best	Notes
1st place, gold medalist(s)	Piotr Kosewicz	Poland	F52	19.48	20.02	x	x	19.66	x	20.02	
2nd place, silver medalist(s)	Velimir Šandor	Croatia	F52	19.09	19.81	19.79	19.79	19.98	19.68	19.98	
3rd place, bronze medalist(s)	Aigars Apinis	Latvia	F52	18.25	19.24	19.54	18.66	19.39	18.58	19.54	SB
4	Rafał Rocki	Poland	F52	19.45	19.51	x	18.92	18.30	19.11	19.51	PB
5	Robert Jachimowicz	Poland	F52	19.36	18.68	x	x	x	19.49	19.49	
6	Henrik Plank	Slovenia	F52	x	13.31	14.26	14.79	x	14.34	14.79	
7	Mohamed Berrahal	Algeria	F51	10.14	x	11.86	12.74	x	12.15	12.74	PR
	Vinod Kumar	India	CNC								

CNC - Classification not Completed

=== F56 ===
Records

Prior to this competition, the existing world, Paralympic, and area records were as follows:

World record	Claudiney Batista (BRA)	46.68	São Paulo, Brazil	3 June 2018
Paralympic record	Claudiney Batista (BRA)	45.33	Rio de Janeiro, Brazil	10 September 2016

Area	Distance (m)	Athlete	Nation
Africa	41.51	Ibrahim Ibrahim	Egypt
America	46.68 WR	Claudiney Batista	Brazil
Asia	45.49	Ali Mohammad Yari	Iran
Europe	42.74	Konstantinos Tzounis	Greece
Oceania	30.63	Bryan Stitfall	Australia

Results

The final in this classification took place on 30 August 2021, at 9:35:

Rank	Athlete	Nationality	Class	1	2	3	4	5	6	Best	Notes
1st place, gold medalist(s)	Claudiney Batista dos Santos	Brazil	F56	44.57	43.77	x	44.92	45.25	45.59	45.59	GR
2nd place, silver medalist(s)	Yogesh Kathuniya	India	F56	x	42.84	x	x	43.55	44.38	44.38	SB
3rd place, bronze medalist(s)	Leonardo Diaz Aldana	Cuba	F56	42.22	42.65	43.36	x	40.99	43.29	43.36	SB
4	Konstantinos Tzounis	Greece	F56	42.61	41.77	41.68	42.86	41.58	42.80	42.86	AR
5	Dušan Laczkó	Slovakia	F56	40.91	x	39.15	40.75	41.37	40.63	41.37	PB
6	Nebojša Đurić	Serbia	F55	x	x	38.26	39.14	36.98	38.28	39.14	GR
7	Olokhan Musayev	Azerbaijan	F55	36.79	37.92	37.24	37.15	35.56	x	37.92	SB
8	Ignas Madumla Mtweve	Tanzania	F55	22.38	x	21.62	x	22.88	x	22.88	SB

=== F64 ===
Records

Prior to this competition, the existing world, Paralympic, and area records were as follows:

World record	Jeremy Campbell (USA)	65.86	Arizona, United States	30 May 2021
Paralympic record	Vacant	–		

Area	Distance (m)	Athlete	Nation
Africa	46.39	Lean Simon	South Africa
America	65.86 WR	Jeremy Campbell	United States
Asia	54.61	Record Mark	
Europe	62.13	Ivan Katanušić	Croatia
Oceania	Vacant		

Results

The final in this classification took place on 2 September 2021, at 19:05:

Rank	Athlete	Nationality	Class	1	2	3	4	5	6	Best	Notes
1st place, gold medalist(s)	Jeremy Campbell	United States	F64	60.22	x	x	54.66	55.62	–	60.22	
2nd place, silver medalist(s)	Ivan Katanušić	Croatia	F64	54.88	53.90	55.06	53.70	x	x	55.06	
3rd place, bronze medalist(s)	Dan Greaves	Great Britain	F44	x	51.79	53.56	x	x	x	53.56	
4	David Blair	United States	F44	x	53.18	x	48.00	x	x	53.18	
5	Egert Jõesaar	Estonia	F44	44.07	x	43.35	43.95	x	x	44.07	
	Harrison Walsh	Great Britain	F44							DNS	
