= 2023 World Para Athletics Championships – Men's discus throw =

The men's discus throw events at the 2023 World Para Athletics Championships were held at Charlety Stadium, Paris, France, from 11 to 16 July.

== Medalists ==
Event	Gold	Silver	Bronze
F11	Alessandro Rodrigo Silva; Brazil	Mahdi Olad; Iran	Alvaro del Amo Cano; Spain
F37	Mykola Zhabnyak; Ukraine	Guy Henly; Australia	João Victor Teixeira de Souza Silva; Brazil
F52	Ajitkumar Amrutlal Panchal; India	Aigars Apinis; Latvia	Piotr Kosewicz; Poland
F56	Claudiney Batista dos Santos; Brazil	Yogesh Kathuniya; India	Dusan Laczko; Slovakia
F64	David Blair; United States	Jeremy Campbell; United States	Dan Greaves; Great Britain

== Results ==
=== F11 ===
The final of the Men's Discus Throw F11 took place at 9:08 on 15 Jul 2023.

Rank	Athlete	Attempts						Result	Notes
Rank	Athlete	1	2	3	4	5	6	Result	Notes
1st place, gold medalist(s)	Alessandro da Silva (BRA)	X	43.64	43.71	44.15	X	45.30	45.30	SB
2nd place, silver medalist(s)	Mahdi Olad (IRI)	39.14	X	38.04	41.24	42.62	43.73	43.73	AR
3rd place, bronze medalist(s)	Alvaro del Amo Cano (ESP)	36.31		X 36.41	X	34.72	37.60	37.60	
4	Bil Marinkovic (AUT)	34.07	36.26	X	X	37.44	X	37.44	SB
5	Petteri Peitso (FIN)	28.61	33.69	35.50	29.07	34.93	X	35.50	
6	Monu Ghangas (IND)	34.00	33.20	34.86	35.18	34.08	35.08	35.18	SB
7	Miroslaw Madzia (POL)	32.04	31.15	X	32.40	X	34.26	34.26	SB
8	Clement Yuh Ndim (CMR)	24.39	X	21.39	20.62	19.38	X	24.39	SB

=== F37 ===
The final of the Men's Discus Throw F37 took place at 9:04 on 16 Jul 2023.

Rank	Athlete	Attempt						Result	Notes
Rank	Athlete	1	2	3	4	5	6	Result	Notes
1st place, gold medalist(s)	Mykola Zhabnyak (UKR)	41.83	X	53.97	40.40	46.25	51.27	53.97	SB
2nd place, silver medalist(s)	Guy Henly (AUS)	51.13	51.52	X	51.02	X	52.45	52.45	SB
3rd place, bronze medalist(s)	Joao Teixeira (BRA)	50.68	50.51	X	52.28	52.33	50.91	52.33	SB
4	Yamato Shimbo (JPN)	45.76	46.77	50.99	X	X	X	50.99	PB
5	Edwars Alexander Varela (VEN)	50.56	48.60	45.25	X	43.12	X	50.56	
6	Hamdi Ouerfelli (TUN)	48.53	X	48.76	49.65	X	50.27	50.27	SB
7	K Marufkhujaev (UZB)	X	43.74	49.59	X	X	X	49.59	PB
8	Hamed Ali (KUW)	40.85	40.03	X	42.17	X	38.73	42.17	SB
9	Lukasz Czarnecki (POL)	40.34	40.74	39.88	—N/a			40.74	
10	Jakub Miroslaw (POL)	X	36.99	X	—N/a			36.99	
—	Jesse Zesseu (CAN)	X	X	X	—N/a			NM	
—	Donatas Dundzys (LTU)	X	X	X	—N/a			NM	

=== F52 ===
The final of the Men's Discus Throw F52 took place on 11 July. The event was also open to athletes in the F51 classification.

Rank	Athlete	Sport Class	Result	Notes
1st place, gold medalist(s)	Ajitkumar Amrutlal Panchal (IND)	F52	21.17	AR
2nd place, silver medalist(s)	Aigars Apinis (LAT)	F52	20.46	SB
3rd place, bronze medalist(s)	Piotr Kosewicz (POL)	F52	19.87	SB
4	Velimir Šandor (CRO)	F52	18.69	SB
5	André Rocha (BRA)	F52	18.55	
6	Rafal Rocki (POL)	F52	17.83	
7	Zoltan Bessenyey (HUN)	F52	13.76	
8	Mohamed Berrahal (ALG)	F51	12.80	SB
9	Raimondas Dabuzinskas (LTU)	F52	11.98	PB
10	Pranav Soorma (IND)	F51	11.43	AR

=== F56 ===
The final of the Men's Discus Throw F56 took place at 9:00 on 12 Jul 2023. The event was also open to athletes in the F55 and F37 classifications.

Rank	Athlete	Attempt						Result	Notes
Rank	Athlete	1	2	3	4	5	6	Result	Notes
1	C Batista dos Santos (BRA)	46.07	45.94	X	45.11	X	X	46.07	CR
2	Yogesh Kathuniya (IND)	43.17	41.82	X	X	40.75	X	43.17	
3	Dusan Laczko (SVK)	42.70	X	42.55	41.15	42.49	42.09	42.70	
4	Konstantinos Tzounis (GRE)	41.74	40.32	41.99	38.61	42.08	39.28	42.08	SB
5	Nebojsa Duric (SRB)	36.31	38.55	39.52	39.00	39.22	39.34	39.52	CR
6	Gm Abdelhamid (EGY)	X	X	X	36.32	36.95	37.35	37.35	PB
7	Ibrahim Ibrahim (EGY)	37.07	X	X	X	X	X	37.07	
8	Yadav Neeraj (IND)	35.19	34.98	27.64	35.54	34.29	34.45	35.54	

=== F64 ===
The final of the Men's Discus Throw F64 took place on 15 July. The event was also open to athletes in the F44 and F43 classifications.

Rank	Athlete	Sport Class	Result	Notes
1st place, gold medalist(s)	David Blair (USA)	F44	60.36	SB
2nd place, silver medalist(s)	Jeremy Campbell (USA)	F64	60.33	
3rd place, bronze medalist(s)	Dan Greaves (GBR)	F44	57.92	
4	Ivan Katanušić (CRO)	F64	56.72	SB
5	Harrison Walsh (GBR)	F44	51.18	
6	Egert Jõesaar (EST)	F44	49.88	SB
7	Andrés Mosquera (COL)	F44	49.37	
8	Sagar Thayat (IND)	F43	48.68	AR
