= 2017 World Para Athletics Championships – Men's discus throw =

The men's discus throw at the 2017 World Para Athletics Championships was held at the Olympic Stadium in London from 14 to 23 July.

== Medalists ==
Event	Gold		Silver		Bronze	
F11	Alessandro Rodrigo Silva; Brazil	43.32	Bil Marinkovic; Austria	33.42	Jose Alexis Belisario Angulo; Colombia	32.46 PB
F12	Hermanus Blom; South Africa	51.16 CR	Saman Pakbaz; Iran	50.07 PB	Kim Lopez Gonzalez; Spain	44.23
F34	Wang Yanzhang; China	37.16	Siamak Saleh-Farajzadeh; Iran	35.02	Mohamed Ali Krid; Tunisia	34.35 SB
F37	Khusniddin Norbekov; Uzbekistan	54.73	Guy Henly; Australia	53.59 SB	M Majidijamalabadi; Iran	52.75
F42	Aled Davies; Great Britain	51.54 CR	Tom Habscheid; Luxembourg	46.83 PB	Dechko Ovcharov; Bulgaria	39.22
F44	Jeremy Campbell; United States	63.66 CR	David Blair; United States	62.47 SB	Ivan Katanušić; Croatia	57.33 PB
F46	Hou Zhanbiao; China	48.42	Wei Enlong; China	48.10	Dmytro Ibragimov; Ukraine	47.89 SB
F52	Andre Rocha; Brazil	23.80 WR	Aigars Apinis; Latvia	21.95 AR	Velimir Šandor; Croatia	17.95
F56	Leonardo Diaz; Cuba	45.47 CR	Ali Mohammadyari; Iran	45.13	Ibrahim Ibrahim; Egypt	37.75
F57	Thiago Paulino dos Santos; Brazil	46.58	Miroslav Petkovic; Croatia	45.99 PB	Wu Guoshan; China	45.62 AR
WR world record | AR area record | CR championship record | GR games record | NR national record | OR Olympic record | PB personal best | SB season best | WL world leading (in a given season)

Events listed in pink were contested but no medals were awarded.

== See also ==
- List of IPC world records in athletics
