= 2019 World Para Athletics Championships – Men's discus throw =

The men's discus throw at the 2019 World Para Athletics Championships was held in Dubai in November 2019.

== Medalists ==
Event	Gold		Silver		Bronze	
F11	Alessandro Rodrigo da Silva; Brazil	46.10 WR	Oney Tapia; Italy	42.50	Mahdi Olad; Iran	41.18
F37	João Victor Teixeira de Souza Silva; Brazil	52.76 AR	Haider Ali; Pakistan	51.43 PB	Guy Henly; Australia	51.43 SB
F52	Aigars Apinis; Latvia	21.05	Piotr Kosewicz; Poland	20.58	Robert Jachimowicz; Poland	19.91 SB
F56	Claudiney Batista dos Santos; Brazil	45.92 CR	Ali Mohammad Yari; Iran	43.51	Yogesh Kathuniya; India	42.05
F64	Jeremy Campbell; United States	61.04	David Blair; United States	59.87 SB	Ivan Katanušić; Croatia	54.53
WR world record | AR area record | CR championship record | GR games record | NR national record | OR Olympic record | PB personal best | SB season best | WL world leading (in a given season)

== See also ==
- List of IPC world records in athletics
