= Yogesh Kathuniya =

Indian Para-discus thrower (born 1997)

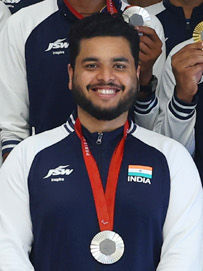
- Kathuniya in 2024

Personal information
- Born: 3 March 1997 (age 29) Bahadurgarh, Haryana, India

Sport
- Sport: Para-athletics
- Disability class: F56
- Event: Discus throw
Medal record
Men's para athletics
Representing India
Paralympic Games
Silver medal – second place	2020 Tokyo	Discus throw F56
Silver medal – second place	2024 Paris	Discus throw F56
World Championships
Silver medal – second place	2023 Paris	Discus throw F56
Silver medal – second place	2024 Kobe	Discus throw F56
Silver medal – second place	2025 New Delhi	Discus throw F56
Bronze medal – third place	2019 Dubai	Discus throw F56
Asian Para Games
Silver medal – second place	2022 Hangzhou	Discus throw F56

Yogesh Kathuniya (born 3 March 1997) is an Indian para-athlete who specializes in the discus throw.

== Early life ==
Kathuniya was born to housewife Meena Devi and her husband Gyanchand Kathuniya, a soldier with the Indian Army. At the age of 9, Yogesh developed Guillain–Barré syndrome. He studied at Indian Army Public School in Chandigarh where his father served in the army at Chandimandir Cantonment. His mother learnt physiotherapy, and within 3 years, at the age of 12 he regained muscle strength to walk again. He later attended Kirori Mal College in Delhi, where he earned a Bachelor's degree in Commerce and joined para games.

== Career ==
In 2016, Kathunia started in para sports after Sachin Yadav, General Secretary of the students' union at Kirori Mal College motivated him to take up sports by regularly showing him videos of para athletes. In 2018, he set a world record in F36 category by throwing the disc to 45.18 m at the 2018 World Para Athletics European Championships in Berlin.

Kathuniya represented India at the 2020 Summer Paralympics and won a silver medal in the discus throw F56 event. In 2021 November, the President of India, Ram Nath Kovind, awarded Kathuniya the Arjuna Award for his silver medal at the 2020 Summer Paralympics. He represented India at the 2024 Summer Paralympics and again won a silver medal in the discus throw F56 event. He competed at the 2025 World Para Athletics Championships and won a silver medal in the Discus throw F56 event.

== See also ==
- India at the Paralympics
