= 2015 IPC Athletics World Championships – Men's discus throw =

The men's discus throw at the 2015 IPC Athletics World Championships was held at the Suheim Bin Hamad Stadium in Doha from 22–31 October.

== Medalists ==
Event	Gold		Silver		Bronze	
F11	David Casinos Sierra; Spain	39.51 SB	Bil Marinkovic; Austria	37.06 SB	Vitalii Telesh; Russia	35.59
F12	Saman Pakbaz; Iran	46.20	Kim Lopez Gonzalez; Spain	44.93	Marek Wietecki; Poland	44.76 SB
F34	Wang Yanzhang; China	41.93	Mauricio Valencia; Colombia	35.06 SB	Jason Roberts; Canada	31.98 PB
F37	Khusniddin Norbekov; Uzbekistan	53.81	Guy Henly; Australia	53.41	Mykola Zhabnyak; Ukraine	52.17
F42	Aled Davies; Great Britain	49.59 WR	Kang Guofeng; China	43.27 PB	Dechko Ovcharov; Bulgaria	42.31 PB
F44	Jeremy Campbell (F44); United States	61.21 CR	David Blair (F44); United States	60.46 PB	Akeem Stewart (F43); Trinidad and Tobago	59.13
F46	Hou Zhanbiao; China	52.64 WR	Wei Enlong; China	50.29	Dmytro Ibragimov; Ukraine	48.38
F52	Aigars Apinis; Latvia	21.44 WR	Robert Jachimowicz; Poland	17.33	Velimir Šandor; Croatia	16.95 PB
F56	Leonardo Diaz; Cuba	45.10 SB	Ali Mohammadyari; Iran	44.97	Nguyen Be Hau; Vietnam	38.94 PB
F57	Wu Guoshan; China	44.56 PB	Claudiney Batista dos Santos; Brazil	44.37 SB	Samir Nabiyev; Azerbaijan	44.34
WR world record | AR area record | CR championship record | GR games record | NR national record | OR Olympic record | PB personal best | SB season best | WL world leading (in a given season)

== See also ==
- List of IPC world records in athletics
