= Oney Tapia =

Italian Paralympic athlete

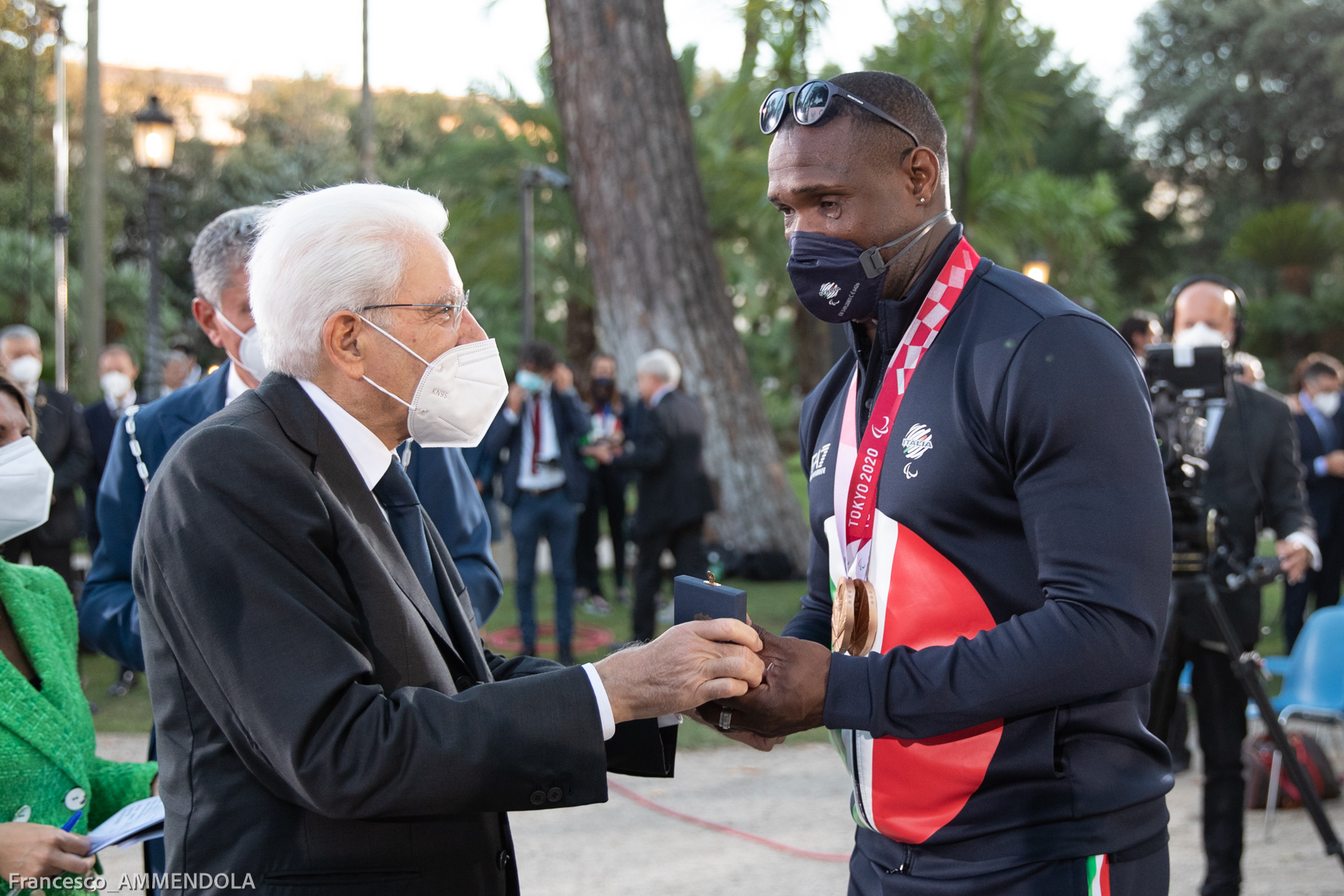
- Tapia awarded by the Italian President Sergio Mattarella at Quirinale Palace in 2021.

Personal information
- Born: 27 February 1976 (age 50) Havana, Cuba

Sport
- Country: Italy
- Sport: Para-athletics
- Disability: Vision impairment
- Disability class: F11
- Events: Discus throw; Shot put
Medal record
Representing Italy
Paralympic Games
Gold medal – first place	2024 Paris	Discus throw F11
Silver medal – second place	2016 Rio de Janeiro	Discus throw F11
Bronze medal – third place	2020 Tokyo	Shot put F11
Bronze medal – third place	2020 Tokyo	Discus throw F11
World Championships
Gold medal – first place	2024 Kobe	Discus throw F11
Silver medal – second place	2019 Dubai	Discus throw F11
European Championships
Gold medal – first place	2016 Grosseto	Discus throw F11
Gold medal – first place	2018 Berlin	Discus throw F11
Gold medal – first place	2018 Berlin	Shot put F11

Oney Tapia (born 27 February 1976) is a visually impaired Italian-Cuban Paralympic athlete competing in discus throw and shot put events. He represented Italy at the 2016 Summer Paralympics in Rio de Janeiro, Brazil and he won the silver medal in the men's discus throw F11 event. He represented Italy at the 2020 Summer Paralympics in the discus throw and shot put events, winning two bronze medals.

== Career ==
Tapia won the gold medal in the men's discus throw F11 event at the 2016 IPC Athletics European Championships held in Grosseto, Italy. In 2017, he participated and won that year's edition of the dancing television show Ballando con le Stelle.

In 2018, Tapia won the gold medal in the men's discus throw F11-13 event at the Para Athletics Grand Prix in Rieti, Italy. At the 2018 World Para Athletics European Championships held in Berlin, Germany, he won the gold medals in both the men's shot put F11 and men's discus throw F11 events. In the discus throw event, Tapia set a new world record of 46.07 m. In 2019, he won the silver medal in the men's discus throw F11 event at the World Para Athletics Championships held in Dubai, United Arab Emirates.

== See also ==
- Italy at the Summer Paralympics (2016, 2020)
