= Claudiney Batista =

Brazilian Paralympic athlete

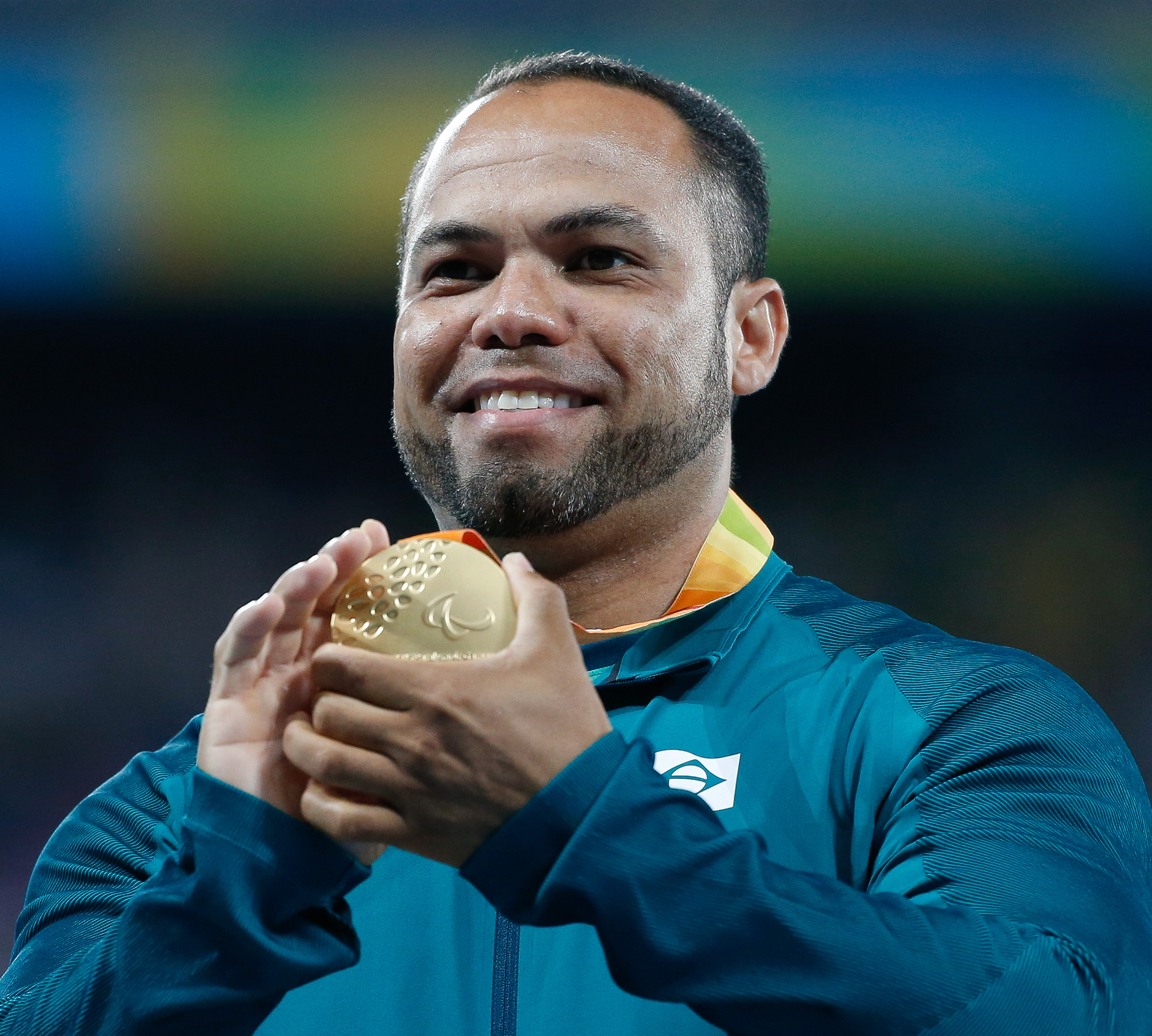
- Batista at the 2016 Summer Paralympics

Personal information
- Full name: Claudiney Batista dos Santos
- Nationality: Brazilian
- Born: 13 November 1978 (age 48)

Sport
- Country: Brazil
- Sport: Athletics
- Events: F57 Shot put F57 Discus; F57 Javelin
- Club: Clube Amigos dos Deficientes

Achievements and titles
- Paralympic finals: 2012; 2016
- Highest world ranking: Javelin: 1st
- Personal best: Javelin: 45.38 m
Medal record
Men's Para athletics
Representing Brazil
Paralympic Games
Gold medal – first place	2016 Rio de Janeiro	Discus throw F57
Gold medal – first place	2020 Tokyo	Discus throw F56
Gold medal – first place	2024 Paris	Discus throw F56
Silver medal – second place	2012 London	Javelin throw F57/58
World Championships
Gold medal – first place	2019 Dubai	Discus throw F56
Gold medal – first place	2023 Paris	Discus throw F56
Gold medal – first place	2024 Kobe	Discus throw F56
Gold medal – first place	2025 New Delhi	Discus throw F56
Silver medal – second place	2013 Lyon	Javelin throw F57/58
Silver medal – second place	2015 Doha	Discus throw F57
Bronze medal – third place	2013 Lyon	Discus throw F57/58
Bronze medal – third place	2015 Doha	Javelin throw F57
Parapan American Games
Gold medal – first place	2011 Guadalajara	Javelin throw F57/58
Gold medal – first place	2019 Lima	Discus throw F56
Gold medal – first place	2023 Santiago	Discus throw F56
Silver medal – second place	2015 Toronto	Discus throw F51/52/53/57
Silver medal – second place	2019 Lima	Shot put F57
Bronze medal – third place	2011 Guadalajara	Discus throw F57/58

Claudiney Batista dos Santos (born 13 November 1978) is a Brazilian para athlete competing in category F57/T57 throwing events. He is a three-time gold medalist in the discus throw events at the 2016, 2020 and 2024 Paralympics.

Batista also earned a silver medal in the javelin throw at the 2012 Games.

== Career history ==
Batista was born able bodied, but after a road accident in May 2005 part of his left leg needed to be amputated. While in hospital he was visited by para-athletic organisations offering sport as a way to help in his recovery. He refused to accept their invitation for over two years, before changing his mind. In 2011 he was part of the Brazilian team which entered into the 2011 Parapan American Games. He entered the javelin and discus, both in the joint F57/58 class, winning the javelin and coming third in the discus. He followed this by being selected for the 2012 Summer Paralympics in London, entering all three throwing events in the F57/58 class. In the discus, he threw a distance of 45.90m, which did not convert to enough points to see him onto the podium, finishing instead at fourth place. In the shot put he finished seventh. His strongest event, the javelin, saw him record a distance of 45.38m, a new world record, only to see his rival, Iran's Mohammad Khalvandi, also throw a world record as a F58 athlete to snatch the gold from Batista dos Santos by 20 points.

At the 2013 IPC Athletics World Championships in Lyon, France, Batista dos Santos was again on the podium. He came third in the discus, taking bronze, and second in the javelin beaten again by Mohammad Khalvandi.

He was one of the 54 paralympians cleared to compete at the Tokyo Olympics postponed to 2021. Other athletes included Rayane Soares (T13, low vision), Beth Gomes (F52), Jerusa Geber dos Santos (T11), Cícero Nobre (F57) and Thiago Paulino.
