= Mahdi Olad =

Iranian Paralympic athlete (born 1986)

Personal information
- Nationality: Iranian
- Born: 1 April 1986 (age 40) Tehran, Iran

Sport
- Sport: Para-athletics
- Disability class: F11
- Events: shot put discus throw
- Coached by: Bahman Rezaei
Medal record
Men's para-athletics
Representing Iran
Paralympic Games
Gold medal – first place	2020 Tokyo	Shot put F11
Silver medal – second place	2020 Tokyo	Discus throw F11
Silver medal – second place	2024 Paris	Shot put F11
World Championships
Gold medal – first place	2019 Dubai	Shot put F11
Gold medal – first place	2023 Paris	Shot put F11
Silver medal – second place	2023 Paris	Discus throw F11
Silver medal – second place	2024 Kobe	Discus throw F11
Silver medal – second place	2025 New Delhi	Shot put F11
Bronze medal – third place	2019 Dubai	Discus throw F11
Bronze medal – third place	2024 Kobe	Shot put F11
Asian Para Games
Gold medal – first place	2018 Jakarta	Shot put F11
Gold medal – first place	2018 Jakarta	Discus throw F11
Gold medal – first place	2026 Aichi–Nagoya	Discus throw F11
Silver medal – second place	2022 Hangzhou	Shot put F11
Silver medal – second place	2026 Aichi–Nagoya	Shot put F11

Mahdi Olad (born 1 April 1986) is an Iranian para athlete specializing in shot put. He represented Iran at the 2020 and 2024 Summer Paralympics.

== Career ==
Olad made his international debut for Iran at the 2018 Asian Para Games and won gold medals in the shot put and discus throw F11 events.

He represented Iran at the 2019 World Para Athletics Championships and won a gold medal in the shot put F11 event with a new Asian record of 14.44 meters. He also won a bronze medal in the discus throw F11 event.

He represented Iran at the 2020 Summer Paralympics and won a gold medal in the shot put F11 event and a silver medal in the discus throw F11 event.

He represented Iran at the 2023 World Para Athletics Championships and won a gold medal in the shot put F11 event and a silver medal in the discus throw F11 event. He again represented Iran at the 2024 Summer Paralympics and won a silver medal in the shot put F11 event with a throw of 13.89 metres.

In October 2026, he competed at the 2026 Asian Para Games and won a gold medal in the discus throw F11 event with a throw of 40.65 metres. He also won a silver medal in the shot put F11 event with a throw of 13.93 metres.
