= Guy Henly =

Australian Paralympic athlete

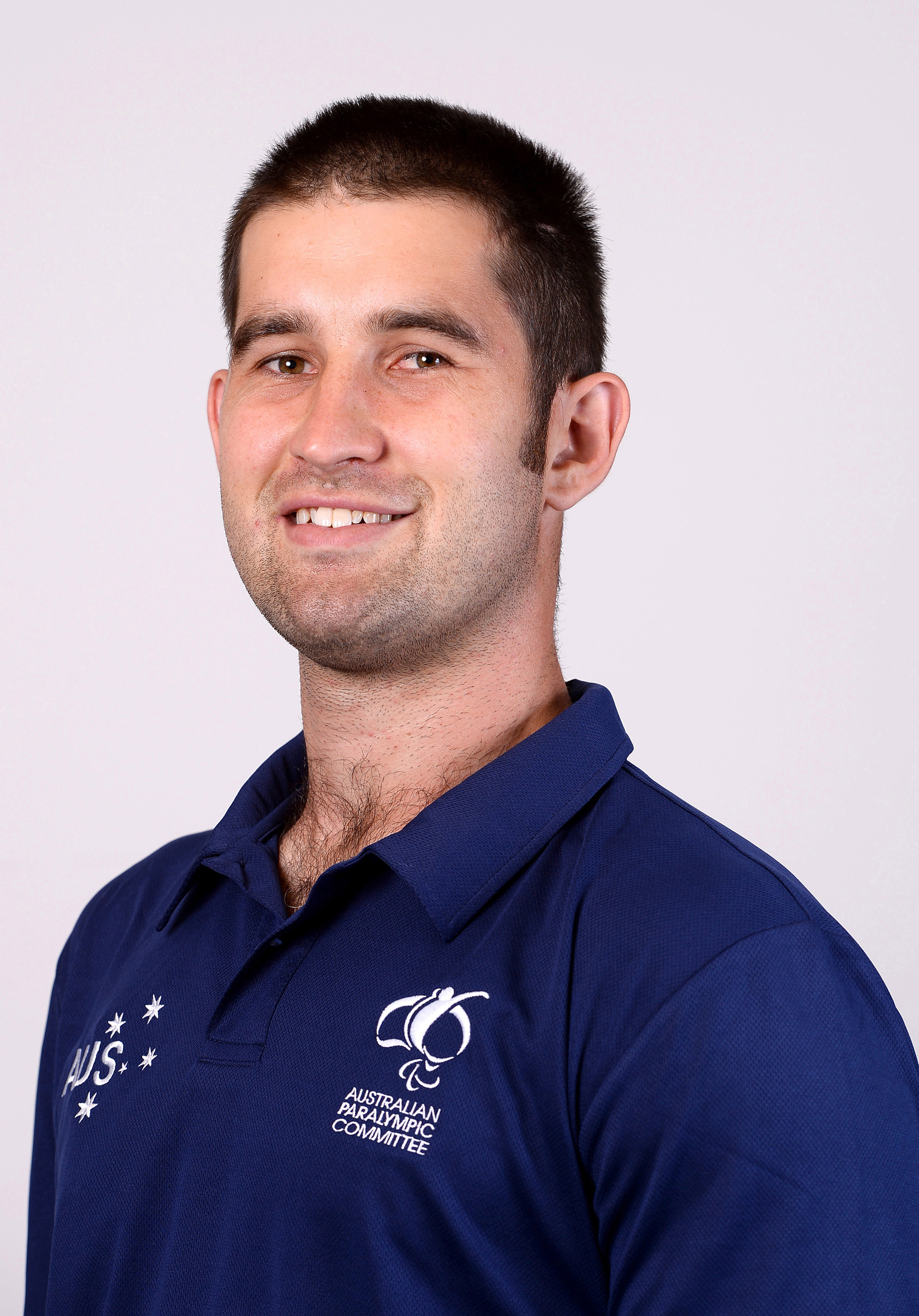
- 2016 Australian Paralympic team portrait

Personal information
- Nationality: Australia
- Born: 14 May 1987 (age 39) Sydney, NSW
- Height: 6 ft 8 in (203 cm)

Sport
- Coached by: Dale Stevenson
Medal record
Men's athletics
Representing Australia
World Championships
Silver medal – second place	2017 London	Discus F37
Silver medal – second place	2015 Doha	Discus F37
Silver medal – second place	2023 Paris	Discus F37
Bronze medal – third place	2013 Lyon	Discus F37/38
Bronze medal – third place	2019 Dubai	Discus F37
Oceania Paralympic Championships
Gold medal – first place	2011 Darwin	Discus F37/38
Silver medal – second place	2011 Darwin	Shot put F37

Guy Nicholas Henly (born 14 May 1987) is an Australian Paralympic athlete. He currently competes in discus and shot put and has won medals at the 2013, 2015, 2017, 2019 and 2023 World Para Athletics Championships. He represented Australia at the 2016 Rio Paralympics, 2020 Tokyo Paralympics and the 2024 Paris Paralympics.

== Personal life ==
When Henly was only 7 years old he developed a brain tumour which affected the right side of his body, including his vision. He has Right Hemi-paresis which falls under the category of cerebral palsy. He enjoys playing tennis and once said his greatest moment was beating the national No. 1 ranked ID tennis player.

== Sporting career ==
Henly wanted to pursue a career in tennis for athletes with a disability but was not eligible as only wheelchair tennis was supported at the Paralympic Games and he decided that wasn't for him. He went to the Australian Paralympic Committee's Toyota Talent Search Program where he was introduced to discus and shot put. Within 8 months he had competed in his first international event. He started competing in athletics in 2010. He was hoping to make the 2012 London Paralympic Games but narrowly missed out.

At the 2011 Oceania Paralympic Championships in Darwin, Northern Territory he competed for Australia in discus and shot put. He received a gold in the Men's Discus Throw Ambulant event (39.07m) and a silver in the Men's Shot Put Ambulant event (11.07m).

At the 2013 IPC Athletics World Championships in Lyon, France he again competed in both discus and shot put. He received a bronze medal in the discus (51.13m) and 8th place in the shot put (11.55m).

Competing at the 2015 IPC Athletics World Championships in Doha, he threw the discus 53.41 m in final round to snatch the silver medal in the Men's Discus F37. After winning the silver medal, he said:"It was a bit of a fairy tale to improve on the bronze in the last round, but my coach just said to have a crack because there was nothing to lose. It's an improvement from a couple of years back, and now hopefully we move up to the gold in Rio to complete the medal set."

At the 2016 Rio Paralympics, he finished fourth in the Men's Discus F37 with a throw of 51.97.

At the 2017 World Para Athletics Championships in London, England, he won a silver medal in the Men's Discus F37 with a throw of 53.59. Henly at the 2019 World Para Athletics Championships in Dubai hurled the discus 51.43m to win the bronze medal - his fourth medal at his fourth world championships in a row.

Henly competed at the 2020 Tokyo Paralympics, where he came 4th in the Men's Discus F37 with a distance of 48:72, just 3 cm short of Brazilian Joao Victor Teixeira de Souza Silva's best throw.

Henly threw 52.45m in the sixth round, to win the silver medal in the Men's Discus F37 at the 2023 World Para Athletics Championships. At the 2024 Paris Paralympics, he finished eight in the Men's Discus throw F37.

In 2024, he is a Victorian Institute of Sport scholarship athlete.
