= David Blair (discus thrower) =

American Paralympic athlete (born 1975)

Personal information
- Born: September 25, 1975 (age 51) Eagle Mountain, Utah, United States

Sport
- Country: United States
- Sport: Para-athletics
- Disability: Clubfoot
- Disability class: F44
- Events: Discus throw; Shot put
Medal record
Paralympic Games
Gold medal – first place	2016 Rio de Janeiro	Discus throw F44
Bronze medal – third place	2024 Paris	Discus throw F64
World Championships
Gold medal – first place	2023 Paris	Discus throw F64
Gold medal – first place	2024 Kobe	Discus throw F64
Silver medal – second place	2015 Doha	Discus throw F44
Silver medal – second place	2017 London	Discus throw F44
Silver medal – second place	2019 Dubai	Discus throw F64
Bronze medal – third place	2015 Doha	Shot put F44
Parapan American Games
Bronze medal – third place	2015 Toronto	Discus throw F44

David Blair (born September 25, 1975) is an American Paralympic athlete.

== Career ==
He represented the United States at the 2016 Summer Paralympics held in Rio de Janeiro, Brazil and won a gold medal in the men's discus throw F44 event. At this event, he also set a new world record of 64.11 m.

He finished in fourth place in the men's discus throw F64 event at the 2020 Summer Paralympics held in Tokyo, Japan.
