= Alessandro Rodrigo Silva =

Brazilian Paralympic athlete (born 1984)

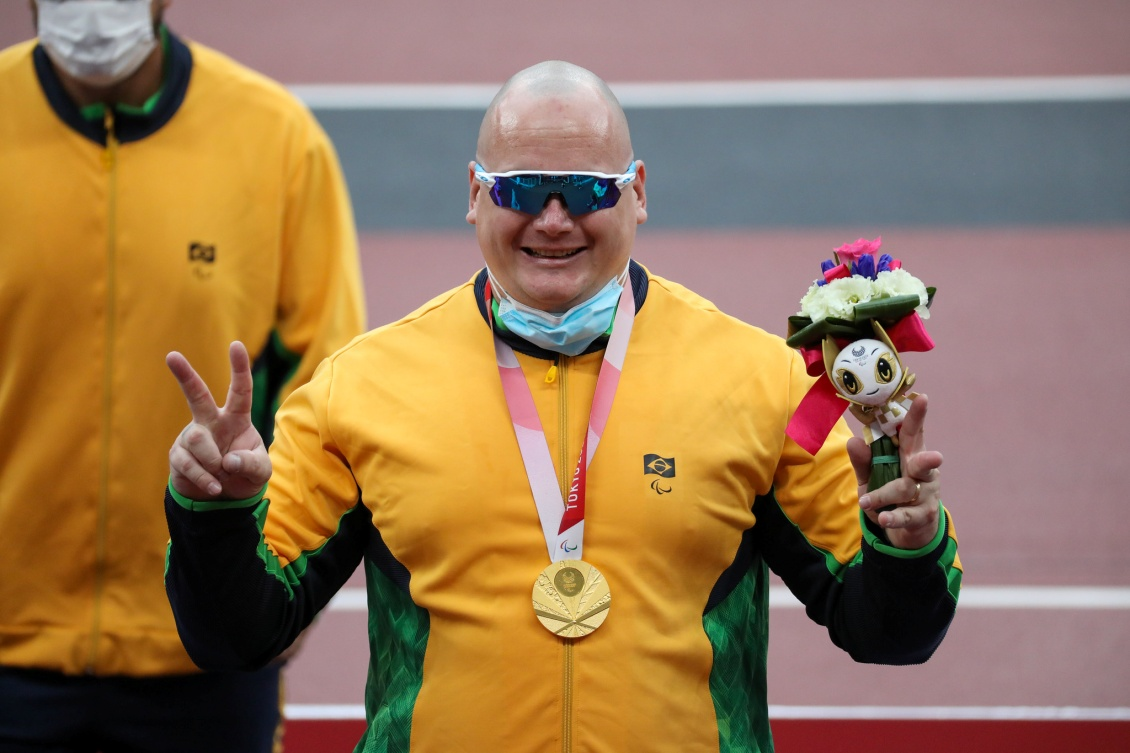
- Alessandro Rodrigo Silva in 2021

Personal information
- Full name: Alessandro Rodrigo da Silva
- Nickname: Gigante
- Born: 28 August 1984 (age 41) Santo André, Brazil
- Height: 1.88 m (6 ft 2 in)

Sport
- Country: Brazil
- Sport: Para athletics
- Disability: Toxoplasmosis
- Disability class: F11, F12
- Events: Discus throw; Shot put
Medal record
Men's para-athletics
Representing Brazil
Paralympic Games
Gold medal – first place	2016 Rio de Janeiro	Discus throw F11
Gold medal – first place	2020 Tokyo	Discus throw F11
Silver medal – second place	2020 Tokyo	Shot put F11
World Championships
Gold medal – first place	2017 London	Discus throw F11
Gold medal – first place	2019 Dubai	Discus throw F11
Gold medal – first place	2023 Paris	Discus throw F11
Silver medal – second place	2025 New Delhi	Discus throw F11
Bronze medal – third place	2019 Dubai	Shot put F11
Parapan American Games
Gold medal – first place	2015 Toronto	Discus throw F11
Gold medal – first place	2015 Toronto	Shot put F11/12
Gold medal – first place	2019 Lima	Discus throw F11
Gold medal – first place	2019 Lima	Shot put F11
Gold medal – first place	2023 Santiago	Discus throw F11

Alessandro Rodrigo da Silva (born 28 August 1984) is a visually impaired Brazilian Paralympic athlete.

== Career ==
He represented Brazil at the 2016 Summer Paralympics in Rio de Janeiro, Brazil and he won the gold medal in the discus throw F11 event. He also competed in the shot put F12 event where he finished in 10th place.

At the 2017 World Para Athletics Championships he won the gold medal in the discus throw F11 event. At the 2019 World Para Athletics Championships he won the gold medal in the discus throw F11 event and the bronze medal in the shot put F11 event. He again won the gold medal in the discus throw F11 event at the 2023 World Para Athletics Championships.
