= Tom Habscheid =

Luxembourgish Paralympic athlete

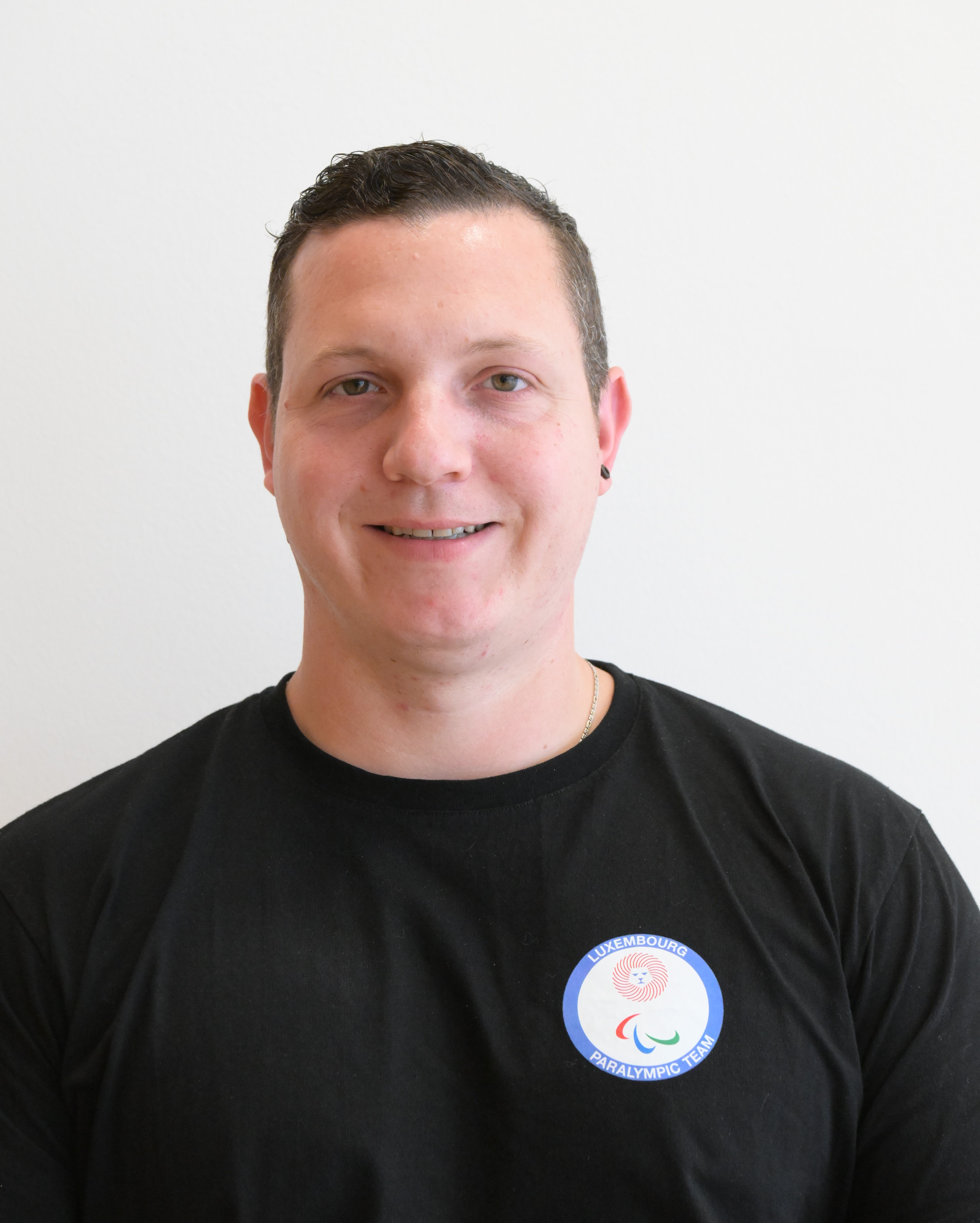

Personal information
- Born: 11 August 1986 (age 39)

Sport
- Country: Luxembourg
- Sport: Para-athletics
- Disability: Proximal femoral focal deficiency
- Disability class: T63 (2018 – present); T42 (until 2018)
- Events: Discus throw; Shot put
Medal record
Men's para-athletics
Representing Luxembourg
Paralympic Games
Bronze medal – third place	2024 Paris	Shot put F63
World Championships
Silver medal – second place	2017 London	Discus throw F42
Silver medal – second place	2019 Dubai	Shot put F63
European Championships
Silver medal – second place	2014 Swansea	Discus throw F42
Silver medal – second place	2016 Grosseto	Discus throw F42
Silver medal – second place	2018 Berlin	Shot put F63
Silver medal – second place	2018 Berlin	Discus throw F63
Silver medal – second place	2021 Bydgoszcz	Shot put F63
Bronze medal – third place	2016 Grosseto	Shot put F42

Tom Habscheid (born 11 August 1986) is a Paralympic athlete from Luxembourg. He won the bronze medal in the men's shot put F63 event at the 2024 Summer Paralympics held in Paris, France. He is a two-time silver medalist at the World Para Athletics Championships and a six-time medalist at the World Para Athletics European Championships.

Habscheid represented Luxembourg at the 2016 Summer Paralympics in Rio de Janeiro, Brazil and the 2020 Summer Paralympics in Tokyo, Japan. Habscheid won a bronze medal at the 2024 Summer Paralympics in Paris, France, becoming the first medal won by Luxembourg since the 1984 Summer Paralympics.

== Career ==
Habscheid won the silver medal in the men's discus throw F42 event at the 2014 IPC Athletics European Championships held in Swansea, United Kingdom. In 2016, he represented Luxembourg at the 2016 Summer Paralympics in Rio de Janeiro, Brazil. He finished in 7th place in the men's shot put F42 event. In 2017, he won the silver medal with a new personal best of 46.83 metres in the men's discus throw F42 event at the 2017 World Para Athletics Championships held in London, United Kingdom.

At the beginning of 2018, World Para Athletics implemented classification changes and, as of that year, Habscheid competes as a T63-classified athlete, a class specifically for athletes with a single above the knee amputation. In that year, he won the silver medal in both the men's discus throw F63 and men's shot put F63 events at the 2018 World Para Athletics European Championships held in Berlin, Germany.

In 2019, Habscheid won the silver medal in the men's shot put F63 event at the World Para Athletics Championships held in Dubai, United Arab Emirates. He also set a new world record of 15.10 metres. In 2021, he won the silver medal in the men's shot put F63 event at the World Para Athletics European Championships held in Bydgoszcz, Poland. He finished in 4th place in the men's shot put F63 event at the 2020 Summer Paralympics held in Tokyo, Japan.

== Achievements ==
Year	Competition	Venue	Position	Event	Notes
Representing Luxembourg
2014	European Championships	Swansea, United Kingdom	2nd	Discus throw F42	40.42
2016	European Championships	Grosseto, Italy	2nd	Discus throw F42	45.41
2016	European Championships	Grosseto, Italy	3rd	Shot put F42	12.98
2017	World Championships	London, United Kingdom	2nd	Discus throw F42	46.83
2018	European Championships	Berlin, Germany	2nd	Discus throw F63	46.22
2018	European Championships	Berlin, Germany	2nd	Shot put F63	14.03
2019	World Championships	Dubai, United Arab Emirates	2nd	Shot put F63	15.10
2021	European Championships	Bydgoszcz, Poland	2nd	Shot put F63	14.53
2024	Summer Paralympics	Paris, France	3rd	Shot put F63	14.97
