= Piotr Kosewicz =

Polish para-athlete and biathlete

Personal information
- Nationality: Polish
- Born: 31 May 1974 (age 52) Luban, Poland

Sport
- Country: Poland
- Sport: Para-athletics
- Disability class: F52
- Event: Discus throw
Medal record
Paralympic athletics
Representing Poland
Paralympic Games
| Gold medal – first place | 2020 Tokyo | Discus throw F52 |
World Championships
| Bronze medal – third place | 2019 Dubai | Discus throw F52 |
| Bronze medal – third place | 2023 Paris | Discus throw F52 |

Piotr Kosewicz (born 31 May 1974) is a Polish Paralympic athlete. He is also a photographer.

== Career ==
He toon up the sport of biathlon in 1994 and competed in the sport until 2002 before taking an extended break from the sport. He later took up the sport of para-athletics in 2015.

=== Winter Paralympics ===
He made his Paralympic debut as a biathlete representing Poland at the 1998 Winter Paralympics and competed in LW10 sitting pursuit event. He also represented Poland at the 2002 Winter Paralympics and competed in LW10 sitting pursuit event.

=== Summer Paralympics ===
He qualified to compete at the 2020 Summer Paralympics after claiming a silver medal in men's discus throw T52 event at the 2019 World Para Athletics Championships.

He represented Poland at the 2020 Summer Paralympics which was his debut appearance at a Summer Paralympics event and his third Paralympic appearance as well as his first Paralympic appearance since competing at the 2002 Winter Paralympics. He clinched gold medal in the men's discus throw during the Tokyo Olympics.
