= 2024 World Para Athletics Championships – Men's discus throw =

The men's discus throw events at the 2024 World Para Athletics Championships were held in Kobe.

== Medalists ==
Event	Gold	Silver	Bronze
F11	Oney Tapia; Italy	Mahdi Olad; Iran	Bil Marinkovic; Austria
F37	Kudratillokhon Marufkhujaev; Uzbekistan	Edwars Alexander Varela Meza; Venezuela	Yamato Shimbo; Japan
F52	André Rocha; Brazil	Velimir Šandor; Croatia	Erik Alejandro de Santos Espinosa; Mexico
F56	Claudiney Batista; Brazil	Yogesh Kathuniya; India	Dusan Laczko; Slovakia
F64	David Blair; United States	Ivan Katanušić; Croatia	Harrison Walsh; Great Britain
