= Farzad Sepahvand =

Iranian Paralympic athlete

Personal information
- Born: 5 July 1986 (age 39) Khorramabad, Iran
- Height: 192 cm (76 in)

Sport
- Country: Iran
- Sport: Athletics
- Disability class: F44
- Event: discus throw
- Coached by: Bahman Rezaei
Medal record
Track and field
Representing Iran
Paralympic Games
| Bronze medal – third place | 2012 London | Discus throw F44 |
IPC World Championships
| Bronze medal – third place | 2011 Christchurch | Discus throw F44 |
Asian Para Games
| Gold medal – first place | 2010 Guangzhou | Discus throw F44 |
| Gold medal – first place | 2014 Incheon | Discus throw F44 |
| Gold medal – first place | 2018 Jakarta | Disucs throw F44 |

Farzad Sepahvand (born 15 July 1986) is a Paralympian athlete from Iran competing mainly in F44 classification throwing events.

== Athletics history ==
Sepahvand took up athletics in 2004 at the age 18. He was first selected for the Iran national team at the 2008 Summer Paralympics in Beijing, entering the discus throw event in the F44 classification. He finished just outside the medal positions in fourth place. Four years later he won his first Paralympic medal, taking bronze in the discus throw at the 2012 Games in London. As well as Paralympic success, Sepahvand has won medals at both the World Championships and Asian Para Games.

== Personal history ==
Sepahvand was born in Khorramabad, Iran in 1986.
