= Athletics at the 2008 Summer Paralympics – Men's discus throw F55–56 =

Men's Discus F55/56 at the XIII Paralympic Games
- Venue: Beijing National Stadium
- Dates: 8 September
- Competitors: 9 from 7 nations
- Winning distance: 40.87

Medalists
1st place, gold medalist(s)		Leonardo Diaz	Cuba
2nd place, silver medalist(s)		Ali Mohammad Yari	Iran
3rd place, bronze medalist(s)		Tanto Campbell	Jamaica

The men's discus F55/56 event at the 2008 Summer Paralympics took place at the Beijing National Stadium on 8 September. There was a single round of competition; after the first three throws, only the top eight had 3 further throws. The competition was won by Leonardo Diaz, representing Cuba.

Rank	Athlete	Nationality	Class	1	2	3	4	5	6	Best	Points	Notes
1st place, gold medalist(s)	Leonardo Diaz	Cuba	F56	40.29	40.87	40.74	39.91	39.12	40.80	40.87	1061	WR
2nd place, silver medalist(s)	Ali Mohammad Yari	Iran	F56	38.65	38.07	x	x	39.39	38.07	39.39	1023	SB
3rd place, bronze medalist(s)	Tanto Campbell	Jamaica	F56	35.51	x	x	36.62	37.50	39.31	39.31	1021	SB
4	Martin Němec	Czech Republic	F55	36.42	35.80	x	34.85	37.48	34.09	37.48	987	PR
5	Miroslav Šperk	Czech Republic	F56	36.24	36.13	33.68	35.84	35.69	36.64	36.64	951	SB
6	Mustafa Yuseinov	Bulgaria	F55	28.12	30.29	35.73	31.14	33.11	32.94	35.73	941	SB
7	Josef Stiak	Czech Republic	F56	34.66	35.41	34.62	35.06	x	36.12	36.12	938	SB
8	Mahmoud Abdelsemia	Egypt	F56	35.24	33.67	32.60	x	x	34.50	35.24	915	
9	Omar Hamadin	Jordan	F56	32.59	32.16	32.12	-	-	-	32.59	846	

WR = World Record. PR = Paralympic Record. SB = Seasonal Best.
