= Ali Mohammad Yari =

Iranian Paralympic athlete

Medal record

Paralympic athletics

Representing Iran

Paralympic Games
Silver medal – second place	2008 Beijing	Discus throw – F55–56
Bronze medal – third place	2012 London	Discus throw – F55–56

IPC World Championships
Silver medal – second place	2015 Doha	Discus throw – F56
Silver medal – second place	2017 London	Discus throw – F56
Silver medal – second place	2019 Dubai	Discus throw – F56

Ali Mohammad Yari is a Paralympian athlete from Iran competing mainly in category F56 discus throw events.

He competed in the 2008 Summer Paralympics

in Beijing, China. There he won a silver medal in the men's F55–56 discus throw event. Four years later he reached the podium again, winning bronze in the discus at the 2012 Summer Paralympics in London.
