= Velimir Šandor =

Croatian Paralympic athlete (born 1985)

Personal information
- Born: 6 October 1985 (age 40) Zagreb, SR Croatia, SFR Yugoslavia

Sport
- Country: Croatia
- Sport: Para-athletics
- Disability: Spinal cord injuries
- Disability class: F52
- Event: Discus throw
Medal record
Men's para-athletics
Representing Croatia
Paralympic Games
Silver medal – second place	2020 Tokyo	Discus throw F52
Bronze medal – third place	2016 Rio de Janeiro	Discus throw F52
World Championships
Silver medal – second place	2024 Kobe	Discus throw F52
Bronze medal – third place	2015 Doha	Discus throw F52
Bronze medal – third place	2017 London	Discus throw F52
Bronze medal – third place	2025 New Delhi	Discus throw F52
European Championships
Silver medal – second place	2016 Grosseto	Discus throw F52

Velimir Šandor (born 6 October 1985) is a Croatian Paralympic athlete. He won the silver medal in the men's discus throw F52 event at the 2020 Summer Paralympics in Tokyo, Japan. He also represented Croatia at the 2016 Summer Paralympics in Rio de Janeiro, Brazil and he won the bronze medal in the men's discus throw F52 event.
