= Hou Zhanbiao =

Chinese Paralympic athlete

Personal information
- Born: 1 September 1986 (age 39) Shijiazhuang, China
- Height: 185 cm (73 in)

Sport
- Country: China
- Sport: Athletics
- Disability class: F46
- Event(s): shot put discus throw javelin throw
- Club: Hebei Province
- Coached by: Li Xiuqing
Medal record
Track and field
Representing China
Paralympic Games
Silver medal – second place	2012 London	Shot put - F46
IPC World Championships
Gold medal – first place	2015 Doha	Discus - F46
Asian Para Games
Gold medal – first place	2014 Incheon	Discus - F46

Hou Zhanbiao (born 1 September 1986) is a Paralympian athlete from China competing mainly in F46 classification throwing events.

== Athletics history ==
Hou represented China at the 2012 Summer Paralympics in London, entering the shot put (T46) event. He won the silver medal recording a distance of 15.57 metres. As well as the Paralympics Hou has also been part of two Chinese teams to compete at the IPC Athletics World Championships, in 2011 in Christchurch and 2015 in Doha. He finished fourth in the discus in 2011, but won gold in the same event in 2015, setting a new world record of 52.64 metres. At Doha he also entered the javelin (9th) and shot put (4th) events.

== Personal history ==
Hou was born in Shijiazhuang, China in 1986. He was born without part of his left arm.
