= Scott Danberg =

American Paralympic athlete (born 1962)

Medal record

Track and field (F40)

Representing United States

Paralympic Games
Silver medal – second place	1988 Seoul	Javelin - L4

IPC Athletics World Championships
Gold medal – first place	1998 Birmingham	Javelin - F40
Gold medal – first place	1998 Birmingham	Shot put - F40
Gold medal – first place	1998 Birmingham	Discus - F40
Silver medal – second place	2006 Assen	Shot put - F40
Bronze medal – third place	2011 Birmingham	Discus - F40

Parapan American Games
Gold medal – first place	2007 Rio de Janeiro	Shot put - F40

Scott Danberg (born July 28, 1962) is a Paralympic athlete from Florida in the United States competing in F40 events. Danberg has appeared in five Paralympics representing America in track and field, swimming and powerlifting.

His wife Pamela is also a Paralympic athlete. They married in 1988 and have a son.
