= Jeremy Campbell =

American Paralympic athlete

Personal information
- Born: August 19, 1987 (age 39) Perryton, Texas, U.S.
Medal record
Men's para athletics
Representing United States
Paralympic Games
| Gold medal – first place | 2008 Beijing | Pentathlon P44 |
| Gold medal – first place | 2008 Beijing | Discus throw F44 |
| Gold medal – first place | 2012 London | Discus throw F44 |
| Gold medal – first place | 2020 Tokyo | Discus throw F44 |
| Gold medal – first place | 2024 Paris | Discus throw F64 |
World Championships
| Gold medal – first place | 2015 Doha | Discus throw F44 |
| Gold medal – first place | 2017 London | Discus throw F44 |
| Gold medal – first place | 2019 Dubai | Discus throwF64 |
| Silver medal – second place | 2023 Paris | Discus throw F64 |
Parapan American Games
| Gold medal – first place | 2007 Rio de Janeiro | Long jump F42/44/46 |
| Silver medal – second place | 2015 Toronto | Discus throw F44 |
| Silver medal – second place | 2019 Lima | Discus throw F64 |

Jeremy Campbell (born August 19, 1987) is an American Paralympic athlete competing mainly in F44 events.

== Career ==
He competed at the 2008 Summer Paralympics in Beijing, China. There he won a gold medal and set a world record in the men's Pentathlon - P44 event, won a gold medal in the men's discus throw - F44 event, and finished fourth in the men's long jump - F42/44 event.

== Personal life ==
He is a brother of National Football League player and Army alumnus Caleb Campbell.
