= Vinod Kumar (athlete) =

Indian Paralympic athlete

Personal information
- Nationality: Indian
- Born: 20 July 1980 (age 45) Rohtak, Haryana, India

Sport
- Country: India
- Sport: Athletics
- Disability class: F52
- Event: Discus throw

Achievements and titles
- Personal best: 22 m

Vinod Kumar (born 20 July 1980) is an Indian athlete who specializes in the discus throw. He participated in the men's discus throw at the 2020 Paralympics and won bronze but was later disqualified after being found not eligible to participate in the event.

Kumar was banned from competition for two years after being found to have intentionally misrepresented his impairment in classification, resulting in his competing against more severely impaired athletes. The ban expired in August 2023.

== Personal life ==
Vinod Kumar was born in Rohtak, Haryana. He joined the Border Security Force where his legs were injured in a fall from a cliff in Leh during training. His father fought in the Indo-Pakistani War of 1971.
