= Leonardo Díaz (parathlete) =

Cuban Paralympic athlete

Leonardo Diaz
Personal information
- Full name: Leonardo Díaz Aldana
- Born: 16 February 1975 (age 51) Bayamo, Cuba

Sport
- Country: Cuba
- Sport: Athletics
- Events: F56 Shot put F56 Discus; F56 Javelin
- Club: ACLIFIM
Medal record
Track and field (athletics)
Representing Cuba
Paralympic Games
Gold medal – first place	2008 Beijing	Discus throw F55/56
Gold medal – first place	2012 London	Discus throw F54-56
Bronze medal – third place	2020 Tokyo	Discus throw F56
World Championships
Gold medal – first place	2011 Christchurch	Discus throw F54-56
Gold medal – first place	2013 Lyon	Discus throw F54-56
Gold medal – first place	2015 Doha	Discus throw F56
Gold medal – first place	2017 London	Discus throw F56
Parapan American Games
Gold medal – first place	2007 Rio de Janeiro	Discus throw F54-56
Gold medal – first place	2011 Guadalajara	Discus throw F54-56
Gold medal – first place	2015 Toronto	Shot put F56
Silver medal – second place	2011 Guadalajara	Javelin throw F54-56
Silver medal – second place	2023 Santiago	Discus throw F56
Bronze medal – third place	2007 Rio de Janeiro	Shot put F56-58
Bronze medal – third place	2011 Guadalajara	Shot put F54-56

Leonardo Díaz Aldana (Note: In this Spanish name, the first or paternal surname is Díaz and the second or maternal family name is Aldana.) (born 16 February 1975) is a Cuban Paralympian athlete competing mainly in category F56 throwing events.

== Career ==
Leonardo has competed in the shot, discus and javelin in three consecutive Paralympics. In his first in Athens in 2004 he failed to finish in the medal positions. On returning four years later to Beijing he won the gold medal in the F55/56 category discus, a feat he replicated in London in 2012.
