= Dan Greaves (discus thrower) =

British Paralympic athlete

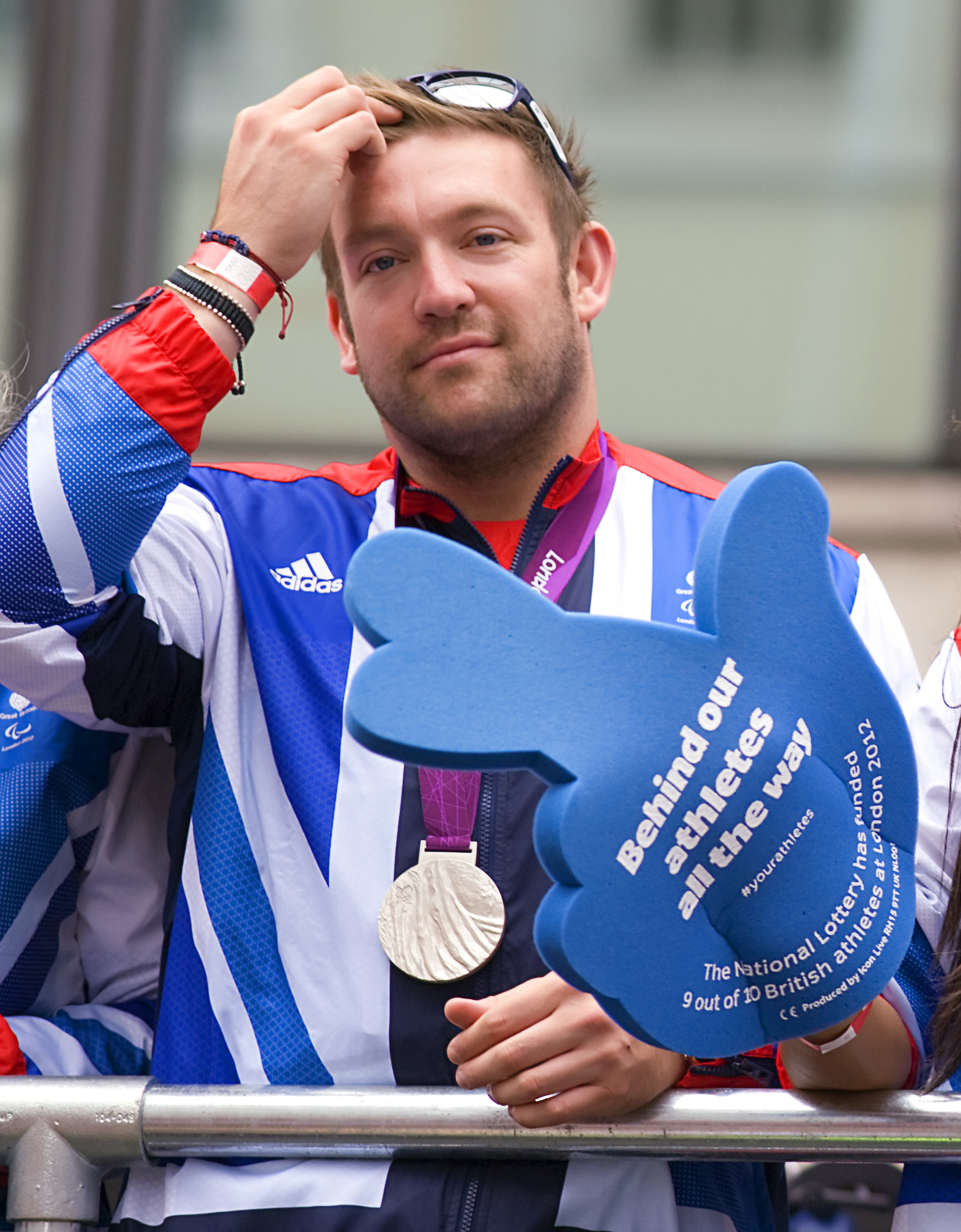
- Greaves in 2012

Medal record

Men's athletics

Representing Great Britain

Paralympic Games
Gold medal – first place	2004 Athens	Discus throw F44/46
Silver medal – second place	2000 Sydney	Discus throw F44/46
Silver medal – second place	2012 London	Discus throw F44
Bronze medal – third place	2008 Beijing	Discus throw F44
Bronze medal – third place	2016 Rio de Janeiro	Discus throw F44
Bronze medal – third place	2020 Tokyo	Discus throw F64

World Championship
Gold medal – first place	2002 Lille	Discus throw F44
Gold medal – first place	2006 Assen	Discus throw F44
Gold medal – first place	2011 Christchurch	Discus throw F44
Silver medal – second place	2013 Lyon	Discus throw F44
Bronze medal – third place	2023 Paris	Discus throw F64
Bronze medal – third place	2025 New Delhi	Discus throw F44

European Championships
Gold medal – first place		2003 Assen
Gold medal – first place		2005 Espoo
Gold medal – first place	2014 Swansea	Discus throw F44
Gold medal – first place	2016 Grosseto	Discus throw F44-46

Representing England

Commonwealth Games
Gold medal – first place	2014 Glasgow	Discus throw F42/44

Daniel Greaves (born 4 October 1982) is a British athlete who specialises in the discus throw.

== Career ==
Greaves was born in Anstey, Leicestershire in 1982.

Greaves won the gold medal in the F44/46 category discus throw at the 2004 Summer Paralympics in Athens, establishing a new world record with a throw of 55.12m. He had previously won silver at the 2000 Summer Paralympics in Sydney.

Despite being born with a deformity of the feet, Greaves was selected to join the British able-bodied team in a competition against the United States in 2001.

Greaves competed in the 2008 Summer Paralympics in Beijing, winning a bronze medal in the F44 discus throw.

He broke the world record again at the pre-IPC World Athletics Championships in New Zealand in January 2011, throwing 59.98m on his fourth throw.

At the 2016 Summer Paralympics held in Rio, Brazil, he won the bronze medal in the F44 Discus Throw.

He won Bronze at the 2020 Summer Paralympics in Tokyo. In doing so he became the first British track and field athlete to win medals at six consecutive Paralympic Games.

At the 2021 para-athletics European championships, Dan won the silver medal in the F64 Discus Throw.

At the 2022 Commonwealth Games, Dan came 4th in the F42/44 Discus Throw.

At the 2023 World Para Athletics Championships, Dan won a bronze medal in the F44 Discus Throw.

Dan was selected to compete at the 2024 Summer Paralympics, aiming for his 7th Paralympic medal. He came 6th in the F64 Discus throw.
