= Jože Flere =

Slovenian Paralympic athlete

Medal record

Paralympic athletics

Representing Slovenia

Paralympic Games
Silver medal – second place	2008 Beijing	Discus Throw – F32/51

Jože Flere (born 27 February 1968) is a Paralympian athlete from Slovenia competing mainly in category F32/51 throwing events.

Flere competed in the 2008 Summer Paralympics in the F32/51 events in the club throw and also in the discus where he won the silver medal.
