= Robert Jachimowicz =

Polish Paralympic athlete

Personal information
- Nationality: Polish
- Born: 7 June 1967 (age 59) Koszalin, Poland

Sport
- Country: Poland
- Sport: Athletics
- Event(s): F52 Shot put F52 Discus
- Club: START Koszalin
- Coached by: Aleksander Poplawski (club); Zbigniew Lewkowicz (national)

Achievements and titles
- Paralympic finals: 2000
Medal record
Track and field (athletics)
Representing Poland
Paralympic Games
Silver medal – second place	2016 Rio de Janeiro	Discus F52
World Para Athletics Championships
Silver medal – second place	2015 Doha	Discus F52
Bronze medal – third place	2019 Dubai	Discus F52
IPC European Championships
Gold medal – first place	2016 Grosseto	Discus F52
Silver medal – second place	2014 Swansea	Discus F52
Silver medal – second place	2021 Bydgoszcz	Discus F52
Bronze medal – third place	2018 Berlin	Discus F52

Robert Jachimowicz (born 7 June 1967) is a Paralympian athlete from Poland competing in category F53 throwing events. He has competed at one Summer Paralympics, in Sydney 2000 and at the 2015 IPC Athletics World Championships in Doha he won the silver medal in the discus throw.

== Personal history ==
Jachimowicz was born in Koszalin, Poland in 1967. He is married and has one son.

== Career history ==
Jachimowicz first came to note as an athlete when he competed at the 2000 Summer Paralympics in the F51 Discus throw. He was originally declared the gold medal winner after throwing over 18 metres, but the British Paralympic team, whose athlete Stephen Miller placed fourth, lodged a complaint about Jachimowicz's disability classification. He was disqualified and did not record a placing.

He next competed at the 2002 IPC Athletics World Championships, competing in both the shot put and discus but failed to complete either event. After an extended absence for the sport, Jachimowicz represented Poland at the 2014 IPC Athletics European Championships in Swansea, taking the silver medal. He took a second silver a year later, this time at the 2015 World Championships in Doha, despite struggling with injury.

In 2016, in the buildup to the Summer Paralympics in Rio, he travelled to Grosseto in Italy to compete in his second European Championships. A throw of 19.42 was enough to give him the gold medal in the discus.
