= Khusniddin Norbekov =

Uzbekistani Paralympic athlete

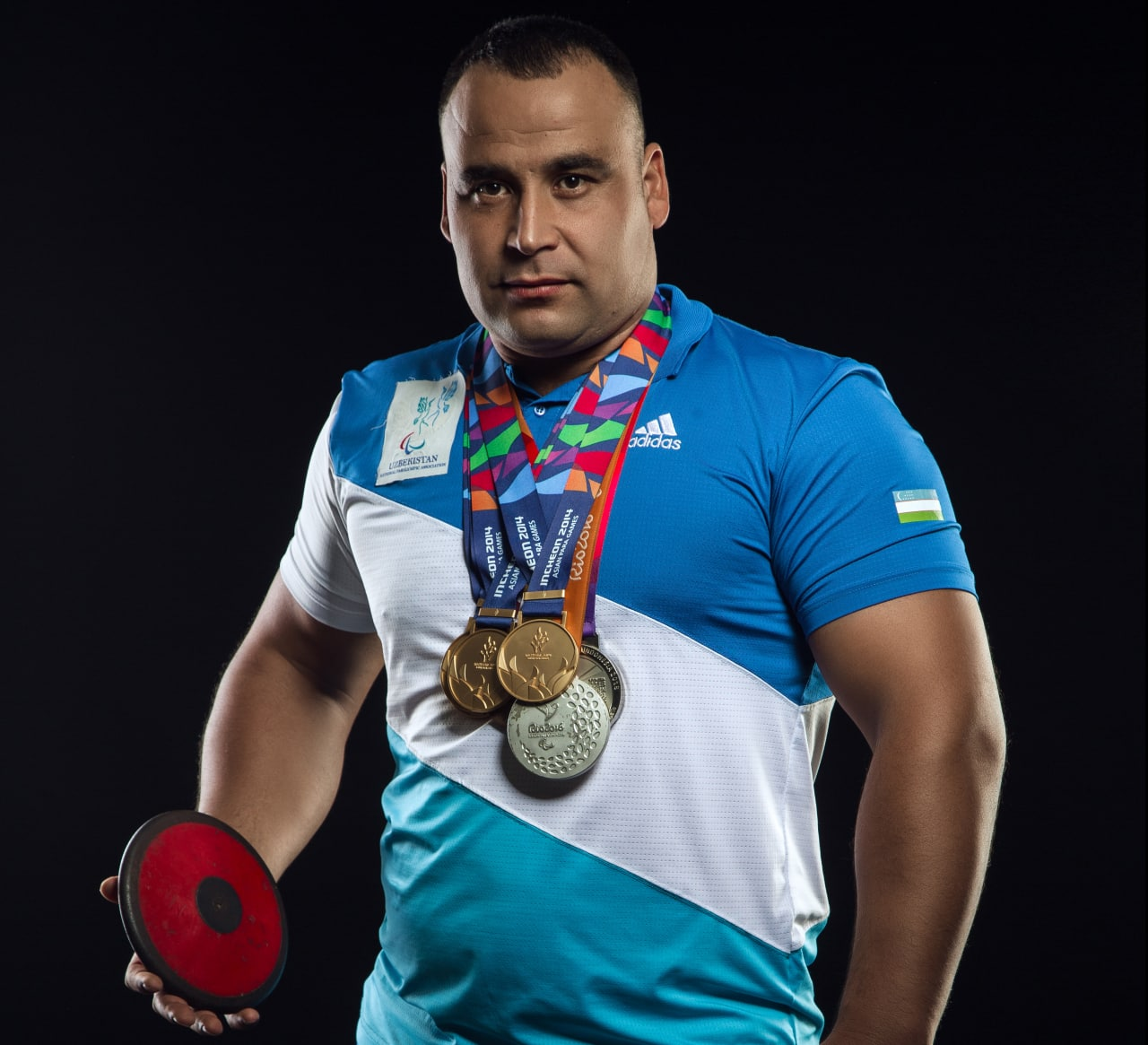

Personal information
- Born: 23 May 1987 (age 39) Navoiy, Soviet Union
- Height: 187 cm (6 ft 2 in)

Sport
- Country: Uzbekistan
- Sport: Para-athletics
- Disability: Cerebral palsy
- Disability class: F37
- Events: Discus throw; Shot put
Medal record
Paralympic Games
Gold medal – first place	2016 Rio de Janeiro	Discus throw F37
Gold medal – first place	2020 Tokyo	Shot put F35
Gold medal – first place	2024 Paris	Shot put F35
Bronze medal – third place	2016 Rio de Janeiro	Shot put F37
World Championships
Gold medal – first place	2015 Doha	Discus throw F37
Gold medal – first place	2017 London	Discus throw F37
Gold medal – first place	2019 Dubai	Shot put F35
Gold medal – first place	2023 Paris	Shot put F35
Gold medal – first place	2024 Kobe	Shot put F35
Silver medal – second place	2017 London	Shot put F37
Bronze medal – third place	2015 Doha	Shot put F37
Asian Para Games
Gold medal – first place	2014 Incheon	Discus throw F37
Gold medal – first place	2018 Jakarta	Shot put F35
Silver medal – second place	2010 Guangzhou	Shot put F37–38
Silver medal – second place	2014 Incheon	Shot put F37

Khusniddin Norbekov (born 23 May 1987) is an Uzbekistani Paralympic athlete with cerebral palsy. He is a Paralympic champion at the Summer Paralympics in 2016, 2021 and 2024. He holds five world championships titles in para-athletics.

== Career ==
In 2008 he began to engage in professional sports in his hometown of Navoiy. Starting from 2009, he started to participate in international competitions as a member of the Uzbekistan national team. In 2014, at the Summer Paralympic Games in Incheon, South Korea, he won a gold medal. In 2015, at the World Para Athletics Championships in Doha, Qatar, he won a gold medal in discus throwing in the F37 category and was awarded a bronze medal in shot put.

In 2016, at the Summer Paralympic Games in Rio de Janeiro, Brazil, he won a gold medal in discus throwing in the F37 category, becoming an Olympic Champion. In shot put, he won a bronze medal in his category at the Paralympic Games. In the same year, Uzbekistan's President Shavkat Mirziyoyev conferred upon him the title of "Pride of Uzbekistan".

In 2017 at the World Para Athletics Championships in London he secured a gold medal in discus throwing and a silver medal in shot put. In 2018, at the Asian Para Games in Jakarta, Indonesia, he won a gold medal. In 2019, at the World Para Athletics Championships in Dubai, UAE, he won a gold medal and set a world record in shot put with a throw of 17.32 meters in the F37 category.

In 2020, at the Summer Paralympic Games in Tokyo, Japan, he won a gold medal in shot put with a distance of 16.13 meters in the F35 category, becoming a two-time Paralympic champion. In the same year, Uzbekistan's President Shavkat Mirziyoyev conferred upon him the title of "Merited Athlete of the Republic of Uzbekistan".
