= Ivan Katanušić =

Croatian Paralympic athlete (born 1991)

Personal information
- Born: 22 May 1991 (age 35) Imotski, Croatia

Sport
- Country: Croatia
- Sport: Para-athletics
- Disability class: F64
Medal record
Men's para-athletics
Representing Croatia
Paralympic Games
Silver medal – second place	2020 Tokyo	Discus throw F64
World Championships
Gold medal – first place	2025 New Delhi	Discus throw F64
Silver medal – second place	2024 Kobe	Discus throw F64
Bronze medal – third place	2017 London	Discus throw F44
Bronze medal – third place	2019 Dubai	Discus throw F64

Ivan Katanušić (born 22 May 1991) is a Croatian Paralympic athlete.

== Career ==
He won the silver medal in the men's discus throw F64 event at the 2020 Summer Paralympics held in Tokyo, Japan. He is also a two-time bronze medalist at the World Para Athletics Championships and he has also won medals at the World Para Athletics European Championships.
