= João Victor Teixeira de Souza Silva =

Brazilian para-athlete (born 1994)

Personal information
- Born: 26 March 1994 (age 32)

Sport
- Country: Brazil
- Sport: Para athletics
- Disability class: F37
- Event(s): Discus throw Shot put
Medal record
Representing Brazil
Para-athletics
Paralympic Games
Bronze medal – third place	2020 Tokyo	Shot put F37
Bronze medal – third place	2020 Tokyo	Discus throw F37
World Championships
Bronze medal – third place	2023 Paris	Discus throw F37

João Victor Teixeira de Souza Silva (born 26 March 1994) is a Brazilian para-athlete, who won bronze in the shot put F37 event at the 2020 Summer Paralympics.
