= 2019 World Para Athletics Championships =

Paralympic track and field event

- Host city: Dubai, United Arab Emirates
- Nations: 118
- Athletes: 1403
- Dates: 7 – 15 November
- Main venue: Dubai Club for People with Determination

The 2019 World Para Athletics Championships was a Paralympic track and field event organised by the World Para Athletics subcommittee of the International Paralympic Committee. It was held in Dubai, United Arab Emirates from 7 to 15 November 2019. It was the 9th edition of the event, formerly known as the IPC Athletics World Championship prior to 2017.

== Location ==
In July 2017 during London 2017 there were reports and speculation that London could once again hold the games in 2019 due to the success of the 2017 event and the 2012 Summer Paralympics. Wheelchair racer Brent Lakatos was vocal on Twitter and drummed up support from other athletes. British superstar Jonnie Peacock closed his part on Channel 4's coverage of the 2017 event by saying "let's have some fun back here in 2019." Prior to the close of bids, UK Athletics stated "Unfortunately, due primarily to scheduled events taking place in the London Stadium in 2019 and the need for funds required to support the bid, we have reluctantly decided that a 2019 bid is not realistic."

Months after the bid deadline, the International Paralympic Committee was still in negotiations with potential host cities.

Official announcement of Dubai as the venue came in June 2018.

== 2020 Summer Paralympics ==
The 2019 World Para Athletics Championships served as a qualifier for all track and field events at the 2020 Summer Paralympics.

== Participating nations ==
1,365 athletes from 117 countries:

- Afghanistan (2)
- Algeria (22)
- Angola (5)
- Argentina (8)
- Armenia (2)
- Australia (38)
- Austria (5)
- Azerbaijan (8)
- Bahrain (6)
- Belarus (9)
- Belgium (11)
- Benin (1)
- Bermuda (1)
- Bhutan (2)
- Bosnia and Herzegovina (1)
- Botswana (5)
- Brazil (43)
- Bulgaria (7)
- Burundi (2)
- Cambodia (1)
- Cameroon (8)
- Canada (28)
- Chile (5)
- China (73)
- Chinese Taipei (6)
- Colombia (9)
- Cuba (8)
- Cyprus (3)
- Denmark (11)
- Ecuador (14)
- Egypt (10)
- Estonia (1)
- Ethiopia (2)
- Fiji (3)
- Finland (7)
- France (28)
- Gambia (1)
- Georgia (2)
- Germany (34)
- Ghana (3)
- Great Britain (42)
- Greece (27)
- Guinea (1)
- Hong Kong (4)
- Hungary (7)
- Iceland (3)
- India (32)
- Indonesia (18)
- Iraq (9)
- Ireland (11)
- Iran (17)
- Israel (1)
- Italy (17)
- Jamaica (9)
- Japan (43)
- Jordan (4)
- Kazakhstan (6)
- Kenya (16)
- Kuwait (8)
- Kyrgyzstan (1)
- Laos (2)
- Latvia (5)
- Lesotho (2)
- Lithuania (8)
- Luxembourg (1)
- Malawi (1)
- Malaysia (11)
- Mali (2)
- Mauritius (11)
- Mexico (19)
- Moldova (5)
- Mongolia (3)
- Morocco (15)
- Namibia (13)
- Netherlands (13)
- New Zealand (18)
- Nigeria (4)
- Norway (4)
- Oman (1)
- Pakistan (2)
- Panama (8)
- Papua New Guinea (2)
- Peru (1)
- Poland (41)
- Portugal (20)
- Qatar (5)
- Romania (6)
- Russia (73)
- Rwanda (2)
- Saudi Arabia (8)
- Senegal (1)
- Serbia (4)
- Singapore (3)
- Slovakia (4)
- Slovenia (1)
- South Africa (25)
- South Korea (4)
- Spain (37)
- Sri Lanka (9)
- Sweden (5)
- Switzerland (10)
- Syria (3)
- Thailand (28)
- Trinidad and Tobago (2)
- Tunisia (22)
- Turkey (28)
- Uganda (2)
- Ukraine (35)
- United Arab Emirates (18) Host country
- United States (62)
- Uzbekistan (25)
- Vanuatu (2)
- Venezuela (14)
- Vietnam (5)

== Schedule ==
Purple squares mark final heats scheduled.

Date →		7 Thurs	8 Fri	9 Sat	10 Sun	11 Mon	12 Tues	13 Wed	14 Thurs	15 Fri
100 m	Men; Details	T51	T53; T54		T33; T34; T36	T37; T38; T64	T12; T47; T52	T11; T13		RR3; T35; T63
100 m	Women; Details		T53; T54		T13; T34; T35	T12	T11; T38; T47	T36; T37; T63	T52	RR3
200 m	Men; Details			T35				T37; T51	T61	
200 m	Women; Details			T36; T64			T12; T13	T11; T38; T42	T35	T37
400 m	Men; Details		T38	T12; T13; T34; T37; T47; T52; T53	T11; T20		T54		T36; T44	T62
400 m	Women; Details	T13		T12; T53	T11; T47	T37	T54			T20; T34
800 m	Men; Details	T36		T54			T53			T34
800 m	Women; Details		T54			T53			T34	
1500 m	Men; Details	T13; T46	T11			T54			T20	T38; T52
1500 m	Women; Details				T20	T54			T13	T11
5000 m	Men; Details							T54	T11; T13	
5000 m	Women; Details							T54		
4×100 m relay	Universal; Details								Mixed	
High jump	Men; Details					T64		T47	T63	
Long jump	Men; Details	T12	T37		T11; T63	T47		T20; T64	T36	T38
Long jump	Women; Details		T12	T38; T47	T37	T64	T62		T20	
Shot put	Men; Details	F11; F55	F57	F20; F37; F53	F12; F34; F41; F63	F35; F38		F32; F36	F33; F40	F46
Shot put	Women; Details		F12	F37		F32	F34; F36; F54	F44	F20; F35; F41	F33; F40
Discus throw	Men; Details	F52				F56		F11; F37	F64	
Discus throw	Women; Details			F57	F64		F11; F38; F41		F53	F55
Javelin throw	Men; Details		F64	F38	F46		F34; F41	F13; F54	F57	
Javelin throw	Women; Details	F54			F34	F13; F46; F56				
Club throw	Men; Details			F32	F51					
Club throw	Women; Details		F32			F51				

== Medal table ==
As of day 9, Friday 15 November

* Host nation (United Arab Emirates)

Rank	Nation	Gold	Silver	Bronze	Total
1	China	25	23	11	59
2	Brazil	14	9	16	39
3	Great Britain	13	9	6	28
4	United States	12	10	12	34
5	Ukraine	11	8	8	27
6	Russia	10	16	15	41
7	Australia	8	6	9	23
8	Tunisia	7	3	3	13
9	Germany	7	2	2	11
10	Uzbekistan	4	2	2	8
11	Poland	3	5	7	15
12	Iran	3	4	4	11
13	Japan	3	3	7	13
14	Canada	3	2	1	6
15	Finland	3	2	0	5
16	Thailand	3	1	2	6
17	Colombia	3	1	1	5
18	Cuba	3	0	0	3
19	Algeria	2	8	6	16
20	Netherlands	2	4	2	8
21	South Africa	2	3	6	11
22	Morocco	2	3	2	7
23	Italy	2	3	1	6
24	India	2	2	5	9
25	Mexico	2	2	4	8
26	Latvia	2	0	1	3
27	Bulgaria	2	0	0	2
28	France	1	3	2	6
29	New Zealand	1	3	1	5
29	Switzerland	1	3	1	5
31	Belgium	1	2	1	4
31	Hungary	1	2	1	4
33	Denmark	1	1	1	3
33	Ecuador	1	1	1	3
33	Kenya	1	1	1	3
33	United Arab Emirates*	1	1	1	3
37	Saudi Arabia	1	1	0	2
38	Czech Republic	1	0	1	2
38	Indonesia	1	0	1	2
38	Ireland	1	0	1	2
38	Namibia	1	0	1	2
38	Serbia	1	0	1	2
43	Chile	1	0	0	1
43	Jordan	1	0	0	1
43	Kuwait	1	0	0	1
43	Norway	1	0	0	1
47	Spain	0	5	3	8
48	Malaysia	0	3	1	4
49	Argentina	0	2	2	4
49	Iraq	0	2	2	4
51	Greece	0	2	1	3
51	Portugal	0	2	1	3
53	Croatia	0	1	3	4
54	Nigeria	0	1	1	2
54	Syria	0	1	1	2
56	Egypt	0	1	0	1
56	Luxembourg	0	1	0	1
56	Pakistan	0	1	0	1
56	Sri Lanka	0	1	0	1
60	Venezuela	0	0	5	5
61	Turkey	0	0	2	2
62	Azerbaijan	0	0	1	1
62	South Korea	0	0	1	1
Totals (63 entries)		172	172	172	516

== Placing table ==
Host nation (United Arab Emirates)

Rank	Name (country)	Points
1	China	597
2	Russia	455
3	United States	409
4	Brazil	358
5	Great Britain	267
6	Ukraine	256
7	Australia	241
8	Poland	206
9	Japan	182
10	Germany	160
11	Tunisia	139
12	South Africa	130
13	Algeria	129
14	India	117
15	Spain	114
16	Canada	112
17	Mexico	107
18	France	104
19	Iran	103
20	Uzbekistan	101
Total (89 Nations)		172 Events

== Individual medallists ==
Athletes who have won three or more medals in the championships.

Name	Country	Medal	Events
Zou Lihong	China	1st place, gold medalist(s) 2nd place, silver medalist(s)	Women's 400m T54; Women's 800m T54; Women's 1500m T54; Women's 5000m T54; Universal 4 × 100 m relay
Omara Durand	Cuba	1st place, gold medalist(s)	Women's 100m T12; Women's 200m T12; Women's 400m T12
Andrei Vdovin	Russia	1st place, gold medalist(s)	Men's 100m T37; Men's 200m T37; Men's 400m T37
Wen Xiaoyan	China	1st place, gold medalist(s)	Women's 100m T37; Women's 200m T37; Women's long jump T37
Walid Ktila	Tunisia	1st place, gold medalist(s) 2nd place, silver medalist(s)	Men's 100m T34; Men's 400m T34; Men's 800m T34
Brent Lakatos	Canada	1st place, gold medalist(s) 2nd place, silver medalist(s)	Men's 100m T53; Men's 800m T53; Men's 400m T53
Deja Young	United States	1st place, gold medalist(s) 2nd place, silver medalist(s)	Women's 200m T47; Universal 4 × 100 m relay Women's 100m T37
Leilia Adzhametova	Ukraine	1st place, gold medalist(s) 3rd place, bronze medalist(s)	Women's 100m T13; Women's 200m T13; Women's 400m T13
Madison de Rozario	Australia	1st place, gold medalist(s) 2nd place, silver medalist(s)	Women's 800m T53; Women's 1500m T54; Women's T54
Luca Ekler	Hungary	1st place, gold medalist(s) 2nd place, silver medalist(s)	Women's long jump T38; Women's 100m T38; Women's 200m T38
Liu Cuiqing	China	1st place, gold medalist(s) 2nd place, silver medalist(s)	Women's 200m T11; Women's 100m T11; Women's 400m T11
Mohamed Alhammadi	United Arab Emirates	1st place, gold medalist(s) 2nd place, silver medalist(s) 3rd place, bronze medalist(s)	Men's 800m T34; Men's 400m T34; Men's 100m T34
Pongsakorn Paeyo	Thailand	1st place, gold medalist(s) 2nd place, silver medalist(s) 3rd place, bronze medalist(s)	Men's 400m T53; Men's 800m T53; Men's 100m T53
Anrune Weyers	South Africa	1st place, gold medalist(s) 2nd place, silver medalist(s) 3rd place, bronze medalist(s)	Women's 400m T47; Women's 200m T47; Women's 100m T47
Zhang Yong	China	2nd place, silver medalist(s) 3rd place, bronze medalist(s)	Men's 400m T54; Men's 1500m T54; Men's 800m T54; Men's 5000m T54
Marcel Hug	Switzerland	2nd place, silver medalist(s) 3rd place, bronze medalist(s)	Men's 800m T54; Men's 5000m T54; Men's 1500m T54
Jiang Fenfen	China	2nd place, silver medalist(s) 3rd place, bronze medalist(s)	Women's 100m T37; Women's 400m T37; Women's 200m T37
Chermen Kobesov	Russia	2nd place, silver medalist(s) 3rd place, bronze medalist(s)	Men's 100m T37; Men's 400m T37; Men's 200m T37
Amanda McGrory	United States	2nd place, silver medalist(s) 3rd place, bronze medalist(s)	Women's 400m T54; Women's 800m T54; Women's 1500m T54
Zhou Hongzhuan	China	2nd place, silver medalist(s) 3rd place, bronze medalist(s)	Women's 100m T53; Women's 400m T53; Women's 800m T53
Tomoya Ito	Japan	2nd place, silver medalist(s) 3rd place, bronze medalist(s)	Men's 400m T52; Men's 100m T52; Men's 1500m T52

== World Records ==
Event	Round	Name	Nation	Time/Distance	Date
Men's 100m T35	Final	Ihor Tsvietov	Ukraine	11.77s	16 November
Men's 100m T36	Final	James Turner	Australia	11.72s	10 November
Men's 100m T42	Final	Anton Prokhorov	Russia	12.42s	15 November
Men's 100m T44	Final	Mpumelelo Mhlongo	South Africa	11.00s	11 November
Men's 100m T62	Round 1 Heat	Johannes Floors	Germany	10.54s	10 November
Men's 200m T35	Final	Ihor Tsvietov	Ukraine	23.04s	9 November
Men's 400m T12	Final	Abdeslam Hili	Morocco	47.79s	9 November
Men's 400m T36	Final	James Turner	Australia	51.71s	14 November
Men's 400m T37	Final	Andrei Vdovin	Russia	50.45s	9 November
Men's 400m T62	Final	Johannes Floors	Germany	45.78s	15 November
Men's 1500m T12	Final	Jaryd Clifford	Australia	3:47.78	7 November
Men's Long Jump T44	Final	Mpumelelo Mhlongo	South Africa	7.07m	13 November
Men's Shot Put F12	Final	Roman Danyliuk	Ukraine	16.69m	10 November
Men's Shot Put F32	Final	Liu Li	China	12.05m	13 November
Men's Shot Put F34	Final	Ahmad Hindi	Jordan	12.17m	10 November
Men's Shot Put F35	Final	Khusniddin Norbekov	Uzbekistan	17.32m	11 November
Men's Shot Put F36	Final	Vladimir Sviridov	Russia	16.32m	13 November
Men's Shot Put F46	Final	Joshua Cinnamo	United States	16.80m	15 November
Men's Shot Put F63	Final	Tom Habscheid	Luxembourg	15.10m	10 November
Men's Discus Throw F11	Final	Alessandro Rodrigo Da Silva	Brazil	46.10m	13 November
Men's Javelin Throw F12	Final	Hector Cabrera Llacer	Spain	64.89m	13 November
Men's Javelin Throw F38	Final	Corey Anderson	Australia	56.28m	9 November
Men's Javelin Throw F41	Final	Sun Pengxiang	China	44.35m	12 November
Men's Javelin Throw F44	Final	Sandeep Chaudhary	India	66.18m	8 November
Men's Javelin Throw F57	Final	Cícero Nobre	Brazil	49.26m	14 November
Men's Javelin Throw F64	Final	Sumit Antil	India	62.88m	8 November
Women's 100m T34	Final	Hannah Cockroft	(United Kingdom) Great Britain	16.77s	10 November
Women's 100m T38	Final	Sophie Hahn	(United Kingdom) Great Britain	12.38s	12 November
Women's 100m T42	Final	Karisma Evi Tiarani	Indonesia	14.72s	13 November
Women's 100m T62	Round 1 Heat	Sara Barrio Andrés	Spain	12.90s	12 November
Women's 200m T36	Final	Shi Yiting	China	28.21s	9 November
Women's 200m T37	Final	Wen Xiaoyan	China	27.11s	15 November
Women's 200m T38	Final	Sophie Hahn	(United Kingdom) Great Britain	25.92	13 November
Women's Long Jump F20	Final	Karolina Kucharczyk	Poland	6.21m	14 November
Women's Long Jump T37	Final	Wen Xiaoyan	China	5.22m	10 November
Women's Shot Put F33	Final	Lucyna Kornobys	Poland	7.81m	15 November
Women's Shot Put F37	Final	Lisa Adams	New Zealand	14.80m	9 November
Women's Shot Put F54	Final	Francisca Mardones	Chile	8.19m	12 November
Women's Discus Throw F38	Final	Simone Kruger	South Africa	33.91m	12 November
Women's Discus Throw F40	Final	Renata Śliwińska	Poland	24.65m	12 November
Women's Discus Throw F51	Final	Zoia Ovsii	Ukraine	13.52m	14 November
Women's Discus Throw F52	Final	Elizabeth Rodrigues	Brazil	16.89m	14 November
Women's Discus Throw F53	Final	Iana Lebiedieva	Ukraine	16.26m	14 November
Women's Discus Throw F57	Final	Nassima Saifi	Algeria	35.76m	9 November
Women's Javelin Throw F12	Final	Zhao Yuping	China	46.00m	11 November
Women's Javelin Throw F33	Final	Lucyna Kornobys	Poland	16.99m	10 November
Women's Club Throw F31	Final	Hind Frioua	Morocco	17.92m	8 November
Women's Club Throw F51	Final	Zoia Ovsii	Ukraine	25.23m	11 November
Universal 4 × 100 m Relay	Round 1 Heat	Liu Yang; Wang Hao; Zou Lihong; Zhou Guohua	China	46.35s	14 November

== See also ==
- 2019 World Athletics Championships
- 2019 World Para Athletics Marathon Championships
- 2019 World Para Swimming Championships
