= Athletics at the 2004 Summer Paralympics – Men's 100 metres T42–46 =

Men's 100m races for amputee athletes at the 2004 Summer Paralympics were held in the Athens Olympic Stadium from 21 to 25 September. Events were held in three disability classes.

== T42 ==
Men's 100m T42 at the XII Paralympic Games
- Venue: Athens Olympic Stadium
- Dates: 21 September 2004
- Competitors: 8 from 6 nations
- Winning time: 12.51

Medalists
1st place, gold medalist(s)		Wojtek Czyz	Germany
2nd place, silver medalist(s)		Clavel Kayitaré	France
3rd place, bronze medalist(s)		Heinrich Popow	Germany

The T42 event consisted of a single race. It was won by Wojtek Czyz, representing Germany.

=== Final Round ===
21 Sept. 2004, 17:10

Rank	Athlete	Time	Notes
1st place, gold medalist(s)	Wojtek Czyz (GER)	12.51	PR
2nd place, silver medalist(s)	Clavel Kayitaré (FRA)	12.78	
3rd place, bronze medalist(s)	Heinrich Popow (GER)	13.00	
4	Stefano Lippi (ITA)	13.09	
5	Andriy Danylov (UKR)	13.32	
6	Michael Haraem (GER)	13.60	
7	Hristo Gerganski (BUL)	15.50	
8	Muhammad Ashfaq (PAK)	17.91	

== T44 ==
Men's 100m T44 at the XII Paralympic Games
- Venue: Athens Olympic Stadium
- Dates: 24–25 September 2004
- Competitors: 16 from 11 nations
- Winning time: 11.08

Medalists
1st place, gold medalist(s)		Marlon Shirley	United States
2nd place, silver medalist(s)		Brian Frasure	United States
3rd place, bronze medalist(s)		Oscar Pistorius	South Africa

The T44 event consisted of 2 heats and a final. It was won by Marlon Shirley, representing the USA.

=== 1st Round ===
Qualified for next round

Heat 1

24 Sept. 2004, 10:55

Rank	Athlete	Time	Notes
1	Brian Frasure (USA)	11.23	Q
2	Robert Mayer (AUT)	12.39	Q
3	Gilberto Alavez (MEX)	12.57	Q
4	Kimhor Nhork (CAM)	12.93	
5	Daniele Bonacini (ITA)	12.95	
6	Noor Alam (PAK)	17.08	
	Neil Fuller (AUS)	DNS	
	Roderick Green (USA)	DNF	

Heat 2

24 Sept. 2004, 11:05

Rank	Athlete	Time	Notes
1	Marlon Shirley (USA)	11.20	Q
2	Oscar Pistorius (RSA)	11.43	Q
3	Dominique André (FRA)	11.71	Q
4	Marcus Ehm (GER)	12.15	q
5	Heros Marai (ITA)	12.27	q
6	Michael Linhart (AUT)	12.52	
7	Xie Zhao Xing (CHN)	12.54	
	Don Elgin (AUS)	DNS	

=== Final Round ===
25 Sept. 2004, 17:30

Rank	Athlete	Time	Notes
1st place, gold medalist(s)	Marlon Shirley (USA)	11.08	=WR
2nd place, silver medalist(s)	Brian Frasure (USA)	11.11	
3rd place, bronze medalist(s)	Oscar Pistorius (RSA)	11.16	
4	Dominique André (FRA)	11.66	
5	Marcus Ehm (GER)	11.73	
6	Heros Marai (ITA)	12.12	
7	Robert Mayer (AUT)	12.18	
8	Gilberto Alavez (MEX)	12.58	

== T46 ==
Men's 100m T46 at the XII Paralympic Games
- Venue: Athens Olympic Stadium
- Dates: 24–25 September 2004
- Competitors: 15 from 12 nations
- Winning time: 11.00

Medalists
1st place, gold medalist(s)		Elliot Mujaji	Zimbabwe
2nd place, silver medalist(s)		Heath Francis	Australia
3rd place, bronze medalist(s)		Sébastien Barc	France

The T46 event consisted of 2 heats and a final. It was won by Elliot Mujaji, representing Zimbabwe.

=== 1st Round ===
Qualified for next round

Heat 1

24 Sept. 2004, 10:35

Rank	Athlete	Time	Notes
1	Elliot Mujaji (ZIM)	11.02	Q
2	Antônio Souza (BRA)	11.04	Q
3	Sébastien Barc (FRA)	11.20	Q
4	Stefan Gaggl (AUT)	11.60	q
5	Ousmane Ndong (SEN)	12.13	
6	Munawar Hussain (PAK)	12.26	
7	Tim Matthews (AUS)	16.44	

Heat 2

24 Sept. 2004, 10:41

Rank	Athlete	Time	Notes
1	Serge Ornem (FRA)	11.10	Q
2	Heath Francis (AUS)	11.21	Q
3	Aleksandr Polishuk (AZE)	11.50	Q
4	Mikhail Popov (RUS)	11.57	q
5	Raphew Reed, Jr. (USA)	11.80	
6	Shafique Muhammad (PAK)	12.54	
7	Ahmed Barry (GUI)	13.00	
	Kiros Tekle (ETH)	DNS	

=== Final Round ===
25 Sept. 2004, 17:50

Rank	Athlete	Time	Notes
1st place, gold medalist(s)	Elliot Mujaji (ZIM)	11.00	
2nd place, silver medalist(s)	Heath Francis (AUS)	11.09	
3rd place, bronze medalist(s)	Sébastien Barc (FRA)	11.13	
4	Serge Ornem (FRA)	11.15	
5	Stefan Gaggl (AUT)	11.43	
6	Mikhail Popov (RUS)	11.64	
	Antônio Souza (BRA)	DSQ	
	Aleksandr Polishuk (AZE)	DNS	
