= Athletics at the 2004 Summer Paralympics – Men's 200 metres T42–46 =

Men's 200m races for amputee athletes at the 2004 Summer Paralympics were held in the Athens Olympic Stadium. Events were held in three disability classes.

== T42 ==
The T42 event consisted of a single race. It was won by Wojtek Czyz, representing Germany.

=== Final Round ===
25 Sept. 2004, 18:15

Rank	Athlete	Time	Notes
1st place, gold medalist(s)	Wojtek Czyz (GER)	26.18	WR
2nd place, silver medalist(s)	Clavel Kayitaré (FRA)	26.64	
3rd place, bronze medalist(s)	Heinrich Popow (GER)	27.10	
4	Michael Haraem (GER)	27.10	
5	Kenji Kotani (JPN)	27.59	
6	Stefano Lippi (ITA)	28.10	
7	Andriy Danylov (UKR)	28.23	

== T44 ==
The T44 event consisted of 2 heats and a final. It was won by Oscar Pistorius, representing South Africa.

Men's 200m T44 at the XII Paralympic Games
- Venue: Athens Olympic Stadium
- Dates: 20–21 September 2004
- Competitors: 12 from 8 nations
- Winning time: 21.97

Medalists
1st place, gold medalist(s)		Oscar Pistorius	South Africa
2nd place, silver medalist(s)		Marlon Shirley	United States
3rd place, bronze medalist(s)		Brian Frasure	United States

=== 1st Round ===
Qualified for next round

Heat 1

20 Sept. 2004, 17:30

Rank	Athlete	Time	Notes
1	Oscar Pistorius (RSA)	23.42	WR
2	Brian Frasure (USA)	24.07	
3	Stephen Wilson (AUS)	24.42	
4	Dominique André (FRA)	24.61	
5	Heros Marai (ITA)	25.23	
6	Kimhor Nhork (CAM)	26.55	

Heat 2

20 Sept. 2004, 17:36

Rank	Athlete	Time	Notes
1	Marlon Shirley (USA)	23.50	
2	Danny Andrews (USA)	24.23	
3	Neil Fuller (AUS)	24.28	
4	Marcus Ehm (GER)	24.69	
5	Michael Linhart (AUT)	25.96	
6	Daniele Bonacini (ITA)	26.18	

=== Final Round ===
21 Sept. 2004, 18:05

Rank	Athlete	Time	Notes
1st place, gold medalist(s)	Oscar Pistorius (RSA)	21.97	WR
2nd place, silver medalist(s)	Marlon Shirley (USA)	22.67	
3rd place, bronze medalist(s)	Brian Frasure (USA)	22.83	
4	Danny Andrews (USA)	22.96	
5	Neil Fuller (AUS)	23.45	
6	Marcus Ehm (GER)	23.71	
7	Stephen Wilson (AUS)	23.75	
8	Dominique André (FRA)	23.87	

== T46 ==
The T46 event consisted of 2 heats and a final. It was won by Antônio Souza, representing Brazil.

=== 1st Round ===
Qualified for next round

Heat 1

19 Sept. 2004, 17:15

Rank	Athlete	Time	Notes
1	Elliot Mujaji (ZIM)	22.04	
2	Serge Ornem (FRA)	22.53	
3	Mikhail Popov (RUS)	23.04	
4	Aleksandr Polishuk (AZE)	23.22	
5	David Roos (RSA)	24.22	
6	Kiros Tekle (ETH)	24.39	
7	Munawar Hussain (PAK)	25.85	
8	Ahmed Barry (GUI)	25.87	

Heat 2

19 Sept. 2004, 17:21

Rank	Athlete	Time	Notes
1	Heath Francis (AUS)	22.39	
2	Antônio Souza (BRA)	22.42	
3	Sébastien Barc (FRA)	22.64	
4	Wu Faqi (CHN)	22.76	
5	Stefan Gaggl (AUT)	22.97	
6	Raphew Reed, Jr. (USA)	23.67	
7	Ousmane Ndong (SEN)	24.72	
8	Shafique Muhammad (PAK)	26.11	

=== Final Round ===
20 Sept. 2004, 17:45

Rank	Athlete	Time	Notes
1st place, gold medalist(s)	Antônio Souza (BRA)	22.41	
2nd place, silver medalist(s)	Sébastien Barc (FRA)	22.62	
3rd place, bronze medalist(s)	Heath Francis (AUS)	22.73	
4	Serge Ornem (FRA)	22.86	
5	Elliot Mujaji (ZIM)	23.00	
6	Wu Faqi (CHN)	23.16	
7	Stefan Gaggl (AUT)	23.27	
8	Mikhail Popov (RUS)	23.73	
