= Athletics at the 2004 Summer Paralympics – Men's 400 metres T44–46 =

Event at the 2004 Summer Paralympics

Men's 400m races for amputee athletes at the 2004 Summer Paralympics were held in the Athens Olympic Stadium from 21 to 23 September. Events were held in two disability classes.

== T44 ==
Men's 400m T44 at the XII Paralympic Games
- Venue: Athens Olympic Stadium
- Dates: 22–23 September 2004
- Competitors: 9 from 6 nations
- Winning time: 51.24

Medalists
1st place, gold medalist(s)		Danny Andrews	United States
2nd place, silver medalist(s)		Neil Fuller	Australia
3rd place, bronze medalist(s)		Ryan Fann	United States

The T44 event consisted of 2 heats and a final. It was won by Danny Andrews, representing USA.

=== 1st Round ===
Qualified for next round

Heat 1

22 Sept. 2004, 10:35

Rank	Athlete	Time	Notes
1	Danny Andrews (USA)	53.58	Q
2	Ryan Fann (USA)	54.75	Q
3	Robert Mayer (AUT)	55.67	Q
4	Stephen Wilson (AUS)	56.19	q
5	Roberto la Barbera (ITA)	56.70	q

Heat 2

22 Sept. 2004, 10:42

Rank	Athlete	Time	Notes
1	Casey Tibbs (USA)	54.12	Q
2	Neil Fuller (AUS)	54.21	Q
3	Marcus Ehm (GER)	54.41	Q
4	Gilberto Alavez (MEX)	58.70	

=== Final Round ===
23 Sept. 2004, 18:30

Rank	Athlete	Time	Notes
1st place, gold medalist(s)	Danny Andrews (USA)	51.24	WR
2nd place, silver medalist(s)	Neil Fuller (AUS)	53.15	
3rd place, bronze medalist(s)	Ryan Fann (USA)	53.64	
4	Stephen Wilson (AUS)	53.98	
5	Casey Tibbs (USA)	54.39	
6	Marcus Ehm (GER)	54.90	
7	Robert Mayer (AUT)	55.02	
	Roberto la Barbera (ITA)	DNS	

== T46 ==
Men's 400m T46 at the XII Paralympic Games
- Venue: Athens Olympic Stadium
- Dates: 21–22 September 2004
- Competitors: 10 from 10 nations
- Winning time: 48.46

Medalists
1st place, gold medalist(s)		Antônio Souza	Brazil
2nd place, silver medalist(s)		Heath Francis	Australia
3rd place, bronze medalist(s)		Wu Faqi	China

The T46 event consisted of 2 heats and a final. It was won by Antônio Souza, representing Brazil.

=== 1st Round ===
Qualified for next round

Heat 1

21 Sept. 2004, 10:05

Rank	Athlete	Time	Notes
1	Heath Francis (AUS)	52.12	Q
2	Antônio Souza (BRA)	52.43	Q
3	Girraj Girraj (IND)	55.18	Q
4	Shafique Muhammad (PAK)	59.53	
5	Mokshud Mokshud (BAN)	1:15.90	

Heat 2

21 Sept. 2004, 10:12

Rank	Athlete	Time	Notes
1	Aleksandr Polishuk (AZE)	51.38	Q
2	Oumar Basakoulba Kone (CIV)	52.11	Q
3	Raphew Reed, Jr. (USA)	52.46	Q
4	Wu Faqi (CHN)	52.49	q
5	Mikhail Popov (RUS)	53.50	q

=== Final Round ===
22 Sept. 2004, 18:10

Rank	Athlete	Time	Notes
1st place, gold medalist(s)	Antônio Souza (BRA)	48.46	WR
2nd place, silver medalist(s)	Heath Francis (AUS)	48.72	
3rd place, bronze medalist(s)	Wu Faqi (CHN)	49.53	
4	Oumar Basakoulba Kone (CIV)	50.72	
5	Aleksandr Polishuk (AZE)	50.99	
6	Mikhail Popov (RUS)	52.23	
7	Raphew Reed, Jr. (USA)	52.23	
8	Girraj Girraj (IND)	53.53	
