= Athletics at the 2004 Summer Paralympics – Men's 4 × 400 metre relay T42–46 =

Men's 4x400m T42-46 at the XII Paralympic Games
- Venue: Athens Olympic Stadium
- Dates: 27 September 2004
- Competitors: 5
- Winning time: 3:27.00

Medalists
1st place, gold medalist(s)		Danny Andrews; Raphew Reed, Jr. Ryan Fann; Brian Frasure	United States
2nd place, silver medalist(s)		Neil Fuller; Don Elgin; Heath Francis; Stephen Wilson	Australia
3rd place, bronze medalist(s)		Xavier le Draoullec; Emmanuel Lacroix; Dominique André; Sébastien Barc	France

The Men's 4x400m relay T42-46 for amputee athletes at the 2004 Summer Paralympics were held in the Athens Olympic Stadium on 27 September. The event consisted of a single race, and was won by the team representing the United States.

== Final round ==
27 Sept. 2004, 11:05

Rank	Team	Time	Notes
1st place, gold medalist(s)	United States	3:27.00	WR
2nd place, silver medalist(s)	Australia	3:33.55	
3rd place, bronze medalist(s)	France	3:37.28	
4	China	3:50.42	
	Mexico	DNS	

== Team Lists ==
United States; Danny Andrews; Raphew Reed, Jr. Ryan Fann; Brian Frasure	Australia; Neil Fuller; Don Elgin; Heath Francis; Stephen Wilson	France; Xavier le Draoullec; Emmanuel Lacroix; Dominique André; Sébastien Barc	China; Xie Zhao Xing; Wei Yuan Bang; Wang Qiu Hong; Wu Faqi
Mexico; Gilberto Alavez; Ruben Fuentes; Pedro Meza
