= Athletics at the 2000 Summer Paralympics – Men's 100 metres T44 =

Event at the 2000 Summer Paralympics

Men's 100 metres T44 at the XI Paralympic Games
- Venue: Stadium Australia
- Competitors: 17 from 11 nations
- Winning time: 11.09

Medalists
1st place, gold medalist(s)		Marlon Shirley	United States
2nd place, silver medalist(s)		Brian Frasure	United States
3rd place, bronze medalist(s)		Neil Fuller	Australia

The men's 100 metres T44 took place in Stadium Australia.

There were three heats and one final round. The T44 is for athletes who have a single amputation below the knee or have some paralysis in one or both legs.

== Heats ==
Qualified for final round

=== Heat 1 ===
Rank	Athlete	Time	Notes
1	Brian Frasure (USA)	11.53	
2	Neil Fuller (AUS)	11.86	
3	Dominique Andre (FRA)	12.28	
4	Almedin Osmanovic (BIH)	13.27	
5	Aliaksandr Katovich (BLR)	13.77	

=== Heat 2 ===
Rank	Athlete	Time	Notes
1	Tony Volpentest (USA)	11.83	
2	Marcus Ehm (GER)	12.10	
3	Marcos Francisco Duenas (ESP)	12.20	
4	Don Elgin (AUS)	12.54	
5	Sanit Dethyok (THA)	12.62	
6	Iman Kuncoro (INA)	14.28	

=== Heat 3 ===
Rank	Athlete	Time	Notes
1	Marlon Shirley (USA)	11.31	
2	Rob Snoek (CAN)	12.21	
3	Martin Horn (GER)	12.33	
4	Abb Saikeseng (THA)	12.39	
5	Stephen Wilson (AUS)	13.77	
6	Salman Mhamad (IRQ)	13.98	

== Final round ==
Rank	Athlete	Time	Notes
1st place, gold medalist(s)	Marlon Shirley (USA)	11.09	
2nd place, silver medalist(s)	Brian Frasure (USA)	11.46	
3rd place, bronze medalist(s)	Neil Fuller (AUS)	11.65	
4	Tony Volpentest (USA)	11.81	
5	Marcus Ehm (GER)	11.92	
6	Dominique Andre (FRA)	12.11	
7	Marcos Francisco Duenas (ESP)	12.11	
8	Rob Snoek (CAN)	12.48	
