= Athletics at the 2004 Summer Paralympics – Men's 4 × 100 metre relay T42–46 =

Men's 4x100m T42-46 at the XII Paralympic Games
- Venue: Athens Olympic Stadium
- Dates: 26 September 2004
- Competitors: 6
- Winning time: 43.90

Medalists
| 1st place, gold medalist(s) | | Raphew Reed, Jr. Casey Tibbs; Danny Andrews; Brian Frasure | United States |
| 2nd place, silver medalist(s) | | Dominique André; Serge Ornem; Sébastien Barc; Xavier le Draoullec | France |
| 3rd place, bronze medalist(s) | | Heath Francis; Stephen Wilson; Neil Fuller; Don Elgin | Australia |

The men's 4x100m relay T42-46 for amputee athletes at the 2004 Summer Paralympics were held in the Athens Olympic Stadium on 26 September. The event consisted of a single race, and was won by the team representing United States.

== Final round ==
26 Sept. 2004, 21:25

| Rank | Team | Time | Notes |
|---|---|---|---|
| 1st place, gold medalist(s) | United States | 43.90 | |
| 2nd place, silver medalist(s) | France | 43.94 | |
| 3rd place, bronze medalist(s) | Australia | 44.03 | |
| 4 | Pakistan | 1:02.08 | |
| | Italy | DNF | |
| | China | DNS | |

== Team Lists ==
| United States; Raphew Reed, Jr. Casey Tibbs; Danny Andrews; Brian Frasure | France; Dominique André; Serge Ornem; Sébastien Barc; Xavier le Draoullec | Australia; Heath Francis; Stephen Wilson; Neil Fuller; Don Elgin | Pakistan; Shafique Muhammad; Muhammad Adeel; Noor Alam; Muhammad Ashfaq |
| Italy; Stefano Lippi; Daniele Bonacini; Roberto la Barbera; Heros Marai | China; Xie Zhao Xing; Mai Wen Jie; Wu Faqi; Zhang Hong Wei | | |
