= Athletics at the 2000 Summer Paralympics – Men's 100 metres T46 =

Men's 100 metres T46 at the XI Paralympic Games
- Venue: Stadium Australia
- Competitors: 23 from 16 nations
- Winning time: 11.13

Medalists
1st place, gold medalist(s)		Elliot Mujaji	Zimbabwe
2nd place, silver medalist(s)		Haichen Liang	China
3rd place, bronze medalist(s)		Tim Matthews	Australia

The men's 100 metres T46 took place in Stadium Australia.

There were three heats and one final round. The T46 is for athletes who have amputations below or above their elbows.

== Heats ==
Qualified for final round

=== Heat 1 ===
Rank	Athlete	Time	Notes
1	Sebastien Barc (FRA)	11.16	
2	Guo Dongfang (CHN)	11.18	
3	Heath Francis (AUS)	11.52	
4	Vitalis Lansihma (NGR)	11.58	
5	Geir Sverrisson (ISL)	11.58	
6	David Roos (RSA)	11.62	
7	Suppachai Boonmanee (THA)	11.84	
8	Ronald Milare (KEN)	11.93	

=== Heat 2 ===
Rank	Athlete	Time	Notes
1	Tim Matthews (AUS)	11.12	
2	Haichen Liang (CHN)	11.21	
3	Pieter Badenhorst (RSA)	11.42	
4	Antonio Souza (BRA)	11.60	
5	Serge Ornem (FRA)	11.72	
6	Kini Carrasco (ESP)	12.56	
7	Aris Kadarisman (INA)	13.07	

=== Heat 3 ===
Rank	Athlete	Time	Notes
1	Elliot Mujaji (ZIM)	11.15	
2	Klaus Felser (AUT)	11.18	
3	Zhang Hongwei (CHN)	11.34	
4	Emeka Obidiegwu (NGR)	11.41	
5	Graham Dunn (GBR)	11.83	
6	Mose Faatamala (SAM)	12.41	
7	Moshoeshoe Makoanyane (LES)	12.76	
8	Niel Louw (RSA)	13.05	

== Final round ==
Rank	Athlete	Time	Notes
1st place, gold medalist(s)	Elliot Mujaji (ZIM)	11.13	
2nd place, silver medalist(s)	Haichen Liang (CHN)	11.14	
3rd place, bronze medalist(s)	Tim Matthews (AUS)	11.15	
4	Guo Dongfang (CHN)	11.18	
5	Sebastien Barc (FRA)	11.27	
6	Klaus Felser (AUT)	11.44	
7	Zhang Hongwei (CHN)	11.62	
8	Emeka Obidiegwu (NGR)	11.64	
