= Errichiello =

Errichiello is an Italian surname. Notable people with the surname include:

- Giovanni Errichiello (born 1960), Italian volleyball player
- Michelle Errichiello (born 1982), Australian athlete

== See also ==
- Pasquale Errichelli (1730–1785), Italian composer and organist
