= Dueñas =

Dueñas or Duenas may refer to:

== People ==
- Christopher Duenas, Guamanian Olympic swimmer
- Crispin Duenas (born 1986), Canadian Olympic archer
- Cristobal C. Duenas (1920–2010), Guamanian lawyer and judge of the District Court of Guam
- Edgar Dueñas (born 1983), Mexican footballer
- Enrico Dueñas (born 2001), Salvadoran-Dutch footballer
- Henry Dueñas, Jr. (born 1965), Filipino politician
- Jani Dueñas (born 1975), Chilean actress and comedian
- Jesús Dueñas (born 1989), Mexican footballer
- Jesus Baza Duenas (1911–1944), Guamanian Catholic priest and leader
- Marcos Francisco Dueñas, Spanish Paralympic athlete
- María Dueñas (writer) (born 1964), Spanish writer
- María Dueñas (violinist) (born 2002), Spanish violinist
- Mario Dueñas (1917–1969), Chilean politician
- Ping Duenas (1930–2009), Guamanian politician

== Places ==
- Dueñas, Iloilo, Philippines
- Dueñas, Palencia, Spain
