= Ryan Fann =

American Paralympic athlete

Medal record

Paralympic athletics

Representing United States

Paralympic Games
Gold medal – first place	2004 Athens	4×400 m relay T42-46
Bronze medal – third place	2004 Athens	400 m T44

Parapan American Games
Bronze medal – third place	2007 Rio de Janeiro	200 m T44

Ryan Fann is a Paralympic athlete from the United States competing mainly in category T44 sprint events.

Fann finished third place in the 400 meters race at the 2004 Summer Paralympics behind winner, fellow American Danny Andrews, whom he teamed up with as part of the gold medal-winning American 4 × 400 m. He is the T44 world record holder of the now defunct race, the 60-meter dash.

He is a co-founder of Amputee Blade Runners.
