= Liang Haichen =

Chinese Paralympic sprinter

Medal record

Track and field (athletics)

Representing China

Paralympic Games
Silver medal – second place	2000 Sydney	100 metres - T46

Haichen Liang is a paralympic athlete from China competing mainly in category T46 sprint events.

Haichen competed in the 100 m, 200 m and 400 m at the 2000 Summer Paralympics winning the silver medal in the 100 m.
