= Clavel Kayitaré =

French Paralympic athlete

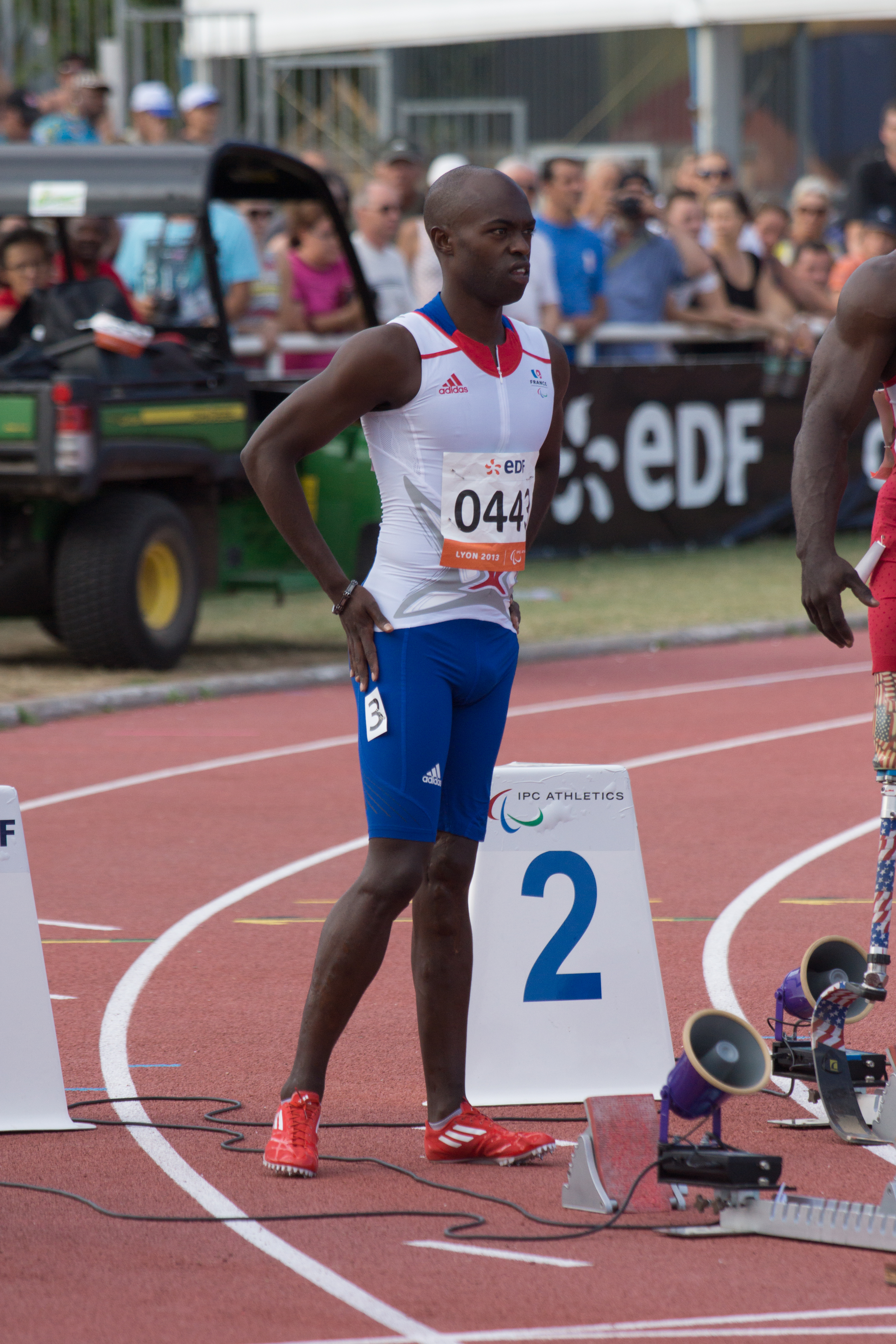
- Clavel Kayitare at the 2013 IPC Athletics World Championships

Personal information
- Nationality: French
- Born: 1986 (age 39–40) Kayonza, Rwanda

Sport
- Country: France
- Sport: Athletics
Medal record
Men's paralympic athletics
Representing France
Paralympic Games
Silver medal – second place	2004 Athens	100 m T42
Silver medal – second place	2004 Athens	200 m T42
IPC World Championships
Silver medal – second place	2011 Christchurch	100 m T42
Bronze medal – third place	2013 Lyon	100 m T42
IPC European Championships
Gold medal – first place	2014 Swansea	100 m T42

Clavel Kayitaré (born 1986 in Kayonza, Rwanda) is a Paralympian athlete from France competing mainly in category T42 sprint events.

Kayitaré won two silver sin the 2004 Summer Paralympics in Athens in the T42 class 100m and 200m. In Beijing in 2008 he was unable to win a medal in either the 100m or as part of the French team in the T42-46 4 × 100 m relay.
