= Xavier le Draoullec =

French Paralympic athlete

Personal information
- Born: 21 July 1961 (age 64) Paris, France

Sport
- Country: France
- Sport: Paralympic athletics
- Disability class: T44
Medal record
Track and field (athletics)
Representing France
Paralympic Games
Silver medal – second place	2000 Sydney	4x100 metre relay - T44
Bronze medal – third place	2000 Sydney	4x400 metre relay - T44
Silver medal – second place	2004 Athens	4x100m - T42-46
Bronze medal – third place	2004 Athens	4x400m - T42-46

Xavier le Draoullec (born 26 July 1961) is a Paralympic retired athlete from France who competes mainly in category F44 long jump events.

== Biography ==
le Draoullec was a member of the 8th RPIMa regiment in Castres in 1979, he joined the Corps of Infantry Parachute Troops of the Navy until 1985. He lost the lower part of his left leg after stepping onto a landmine while on mission in Lebanon in 1982. Following his injury, he was awarded the Military Medal in October 1982, he had also gained Knight of the National Order of Merit in 2000, Knight of the National Order of the Legion of Honor in 2002 and Officer of the National Order of Merit in 2004.

== Sporting career ==
Xavier le Draoullec first competed in the 2000 Summer Paralympics in the T44 400m and F44 long jump before combining with his French teammates to win silver in the 4 × 100 m relay and bronze in the 4 × 400 m relay.

Draoullec competed in the 2004 Summer Paralympics in the long jump and pentathlon, as well as winning a bronze and silver medal as part of the French relay teams in the 4 × 400 m and 4 × 100 m team events, respectively. He returned to the 2008 Summer Paralympics, competing in the 4 × 100 m relay and the long jump.
