= Brian Frasure =

American Paralympic sprinter

Personal information
- Full name: Timothy Brian Frasure
- Born: February 2, 1973 (age 53) Hickory, North Carolina, U.S.

Sport
- Sport: Para athletics
- Disability class: T44
Medal record
Representing United States
Paralympic Games
Gold medal – first place	2004 Athens	4x100m T42-46
Gold medal – first place	2004 Athens	4x400m T42-46
Gold medal – first place	2008 Beijing	4x100m T42-46
Gold medal – first place	2008 Beijing	4x100m T42-46
Silver medal – second place	2000 Sydney	100m T44
Silver medal – second place	2000 Sydney	100m T44
Silver medal – second place	2004 Athens	100m T44
Bronze medal – third place	2004 Athens	200m T44
Bronze medal – third place	2008 Beijing	100m T44
Parapan American Games
Gold medal – first place	2007 Rio de Janeiro	200m T44
Silver medal – second place	2007 Rio de Janeiro	100m T44

Timothy Brian Frasure (born February 2, 1973) is a Paralympian athlete and prosthetist from the United States competing mainly in category T44 sprint events.

== Paralympic career ==
He competed in the 2000 Summer Paralympics in Sydney, Australia. There he won a silver medal in the men's 100 metres - T44 event and was disqualified in the men's 200 metres - T44 event. He'd tested positive for Nandrolone. This was later overturned as there was no evidence of advertent use. He also competed at the 2004 Summer Paralympics in Athens, Greece, where he won a gold medal in the men's 4 x 100 metre relay - T42-46 event, a gold medal in the men's 4 x 400 metre relay - T42-46 event, a silver medal in the men's 100 metres - T44 event, and a bronze medal in the men's 200 metres - T44 event. He also competed in the 2000 Summer Paralympics T44 200 metres, breaking the world record in the heats but was disqualified in the final. He also competed at the 2008 Summer Paralympics in Beijing, China, winning a gold medal in the men's 4 x 100 metre relay - T42-46 event and a bronze medal in the men's 100 metres - T44 event.

== Prosthetist career ==
Frasure fitted Oscar Pistorius with his first pair of Össur Flex-Foot Cheetah carbon fiber running blades.

== See also ==
- The Mechanics of Running Blades
