= Marlon Shirley =

American Paralympic athlete

Personal information
- Born: April 21, 1978 (age 48) Las Vegas, Nevada, U.S.

Sport
- Sport: Track and field
- Disability class: T44
Medal record
Men's para-athletics
Representing United States
Paralympic Games
Gold medal – first place	2000 Sydney	100 m – T44
Gold medal – first place	2004 Athens	100 m- T44
Silver medal – second place	2000 Sydney	High jump – F46
Silver medal – second place	2004 Athens	200 m – T44
Bronze medal – third place	2004 Athens	Long jump – F44
Parapan American Games
Gold medal – first place	2007 Rio de Janeiro	100 m – T44
IPC World Championships
Gold medal – first place	2002 Villeneuved'Ascq, France	100 m – T44 – World Record
Gold medal – first place	2002 Villeneuved'Ascq, France	Long Jump – T44 – World Record – 6.79m
Gold medal – first place	2002 Villeneuved'Ascq, France	4x100 m – T44
Gold medal – first place	2006 Assen, The Netherlands	Long Jump
Gold medal – first place	2006 Assen, The Netherlands	4x100 m – T44- World Record
IPC European Championships
Gold medal – first place	2005 Espoo, Finland	100 m – T44 – 11.03 World Record
Gold medal – first place	2005 Espoo, Finland	200 m
Gold medal – first place	2005 Espoo, Finland	Long Jump – T44
Gold medal – first place	2005 Espoo, Finland	4x100 m – T44
Gold medal – first place	2007 Espoo, Finland	100m – T44 – World Record – 10.91

Marlon Shirley (born April 21, 1978) is a paralympic athlete gold medalist from the United States competing mainly in category T44 events. He has been called the "fastest amputee in the world". He is known for being the first lower extremity amputee to break the 11 second barrier in the 100 meters. He has held world records in the 100M, the Long Jump, High Jump and the 200M.

== Biography ==
At the age of five, Marlon was taken into state care by social services after living on the streets of Las Vegas. Marlon's early life was spent in foster care around Las Vegas. While living in an orphanage in Boulder City, Nevada, he was involved in a lawnmower accident which resulted in his left foot amputation. His life was turned around at the age of nine when he was adopted by a family in Tremonton, Utah.

Marlon's track and field athleticism was discovered in February 1997 at the Simplot Games in Pocatello, Idaho. This turning point in his life was made even more remarkable because Marlon attended the event with a fractured leg bone. At the event, Marlon competed in the high jump, where he amazed Paralympic Coach Bryan Hoddle when he was able to break the 6'6" mark, beating the existing Paralympic record, all while jumping on one foot. Following the Simplot games, Hoddle invited Marlon to a Disabled Sports USA track meet, where Marlon cleared the high jump world record, and once again, and won $13,000 in prize money. He was subsequently invited by Hoddle to train in Olympia, Washington, as a paralympic athlete. Marlon has competed internationally in track and field events.

Marlon Shirley went on to compete in the 2000 Summer Paralympics long jump, the high jump- in which he obtained a silver medal, and in the 100m, where he made his mark by winning the gold medal. He was able to defend his 100m title in 2004 Summer Paralympics where he also competed and won a silver in the 200m, and a bronze in long jump. He competed in just the 100m at the 2008 Summer Paralympics, after battling several injuries and surgeries, but was unable to defend his title, due to a ruptured Achilles mid-race. Nevertheless, even with a ruptured Achilles, he crossed the finish line.

Marlon has "helped design and test prosthetics, pushing the limits of tech that has gone on to help veterans and create a better everyday walking foot for amputees". Marlon has been able to make "a lasting impact on people with disabilities" and is an inspiration to many. He has been a role model in changing perspectives of definitions of disabilities.

== Honors and awards ==
- Marlon was given the 2000 United Nations' "Role Model for the 21st Century" award.
- In 2000 Marlon was also given the United States' Olympic Committee's "Olympic Spirit" award.
- Maron has been awarded two ESPY awards, one in 2003 as the Best Athlete with a Disability, and another in 2005 as the Best Male Athlete with a Disability.
- In 2002, in Villeneuved'Ascq, France, Marlon broke the T44/F44 Long Jump world record at 6.76m.
- Marlon was the first amputee to break 11 seconds in the 100M in 2003.
- In 2005 Marlon was the recipient of the San Diego Hall of Fame Best Disabled Athlete Award
- Marlon set a new world record in the 100M in 2007 in Espoo, Finland
- Marlon was nominated to the Paralympic Hall of fame in 2022

== See also ==
- The Mechanics of Running Blades
