= Sébastien Barc =

French Paralympic athlete

Medal record

Track and field (athletics)

Representing France

Paralympic Games
Gold medal – first place	2000 Sydney	200 metres - T46
Silver medal – second place	2000 Sydney	4x100m - T46
Silver medal – second place	2004 Athens	200 metres - T46
Silver medal – second place	2004 Athens	4x100m - T42-46
Bronze medal – third place	2000 Sydney	4x400m - T46
Bronze medal – third place	2004 Athens	100 metres - T46
Bronze medal – third place	2004 Athens	4x400m - T42-46

Sébastien Barc (Notre-Dame-d'Oé) is a paralympian athlete from France competing mainly in T46 (classification) sprint events. He is a Citoyen d'Honneur of Notre-Dame-d'Oé, and the town's gymnasium, inaugurated in 2008, was named after him.

Barc has competed at two Paralympics, the first in Sydney in 2000 and then in Athens in the 2004. On both occasions he competed in the 100m and 200m and was part of both the 4 × 100 m and 4 × 400 m French relay teams. Over the two games he has won seven medals a bronze in the 2004 100m, a gold followed by a silver in the 200m, two silvers in 4 × 100 m and two bronzes in the 4 × 400 m.
