= Michelle Errichiello =

Australian athlete (born 1982)

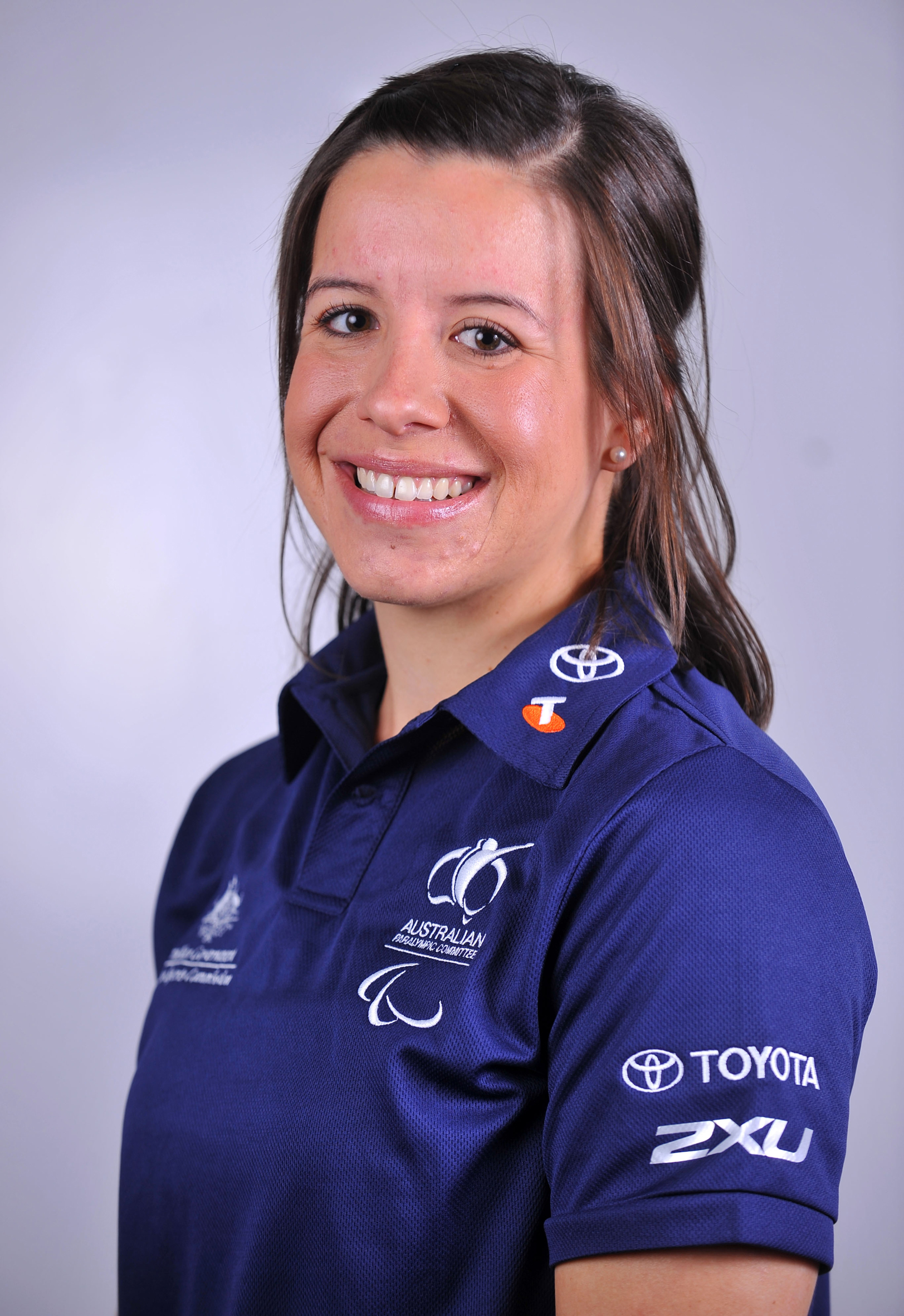
- 2012 Australian Paralympic team portrait of Errichiello

Personal information
- Nationality: Australian
- Born: 7 December 1982 (age 43)

Sport
- Country: Australia
- Sport: Athletics
- Disability class: T42
- Events: 100 metres Long jump

Michelle Errichiello (born 7 December 1982) is an Australian athlete. She was selected to represent Australia at the 2012 Summer Paralympics in athletics. She did not medal at the 2012 Games.

== Personal ==
Errichiello was born on 7 December 1982 and is originally from Strathmore, Victoria. In high school, she did not participate in any sports. In 2007, while she was putting out rubbish bins for a real estate company she worked for, a car had an accident and ended up pinning her to a wall. The accident led to her right leg being severed above the knee. In 2010, she earned the Pride of Australia medal. As of 2012, she lives in Gungahlin, Australian Capital Territory and is working on a degree that will eventually enable her to be a qualified trauma counsellor.

== Athletics ==
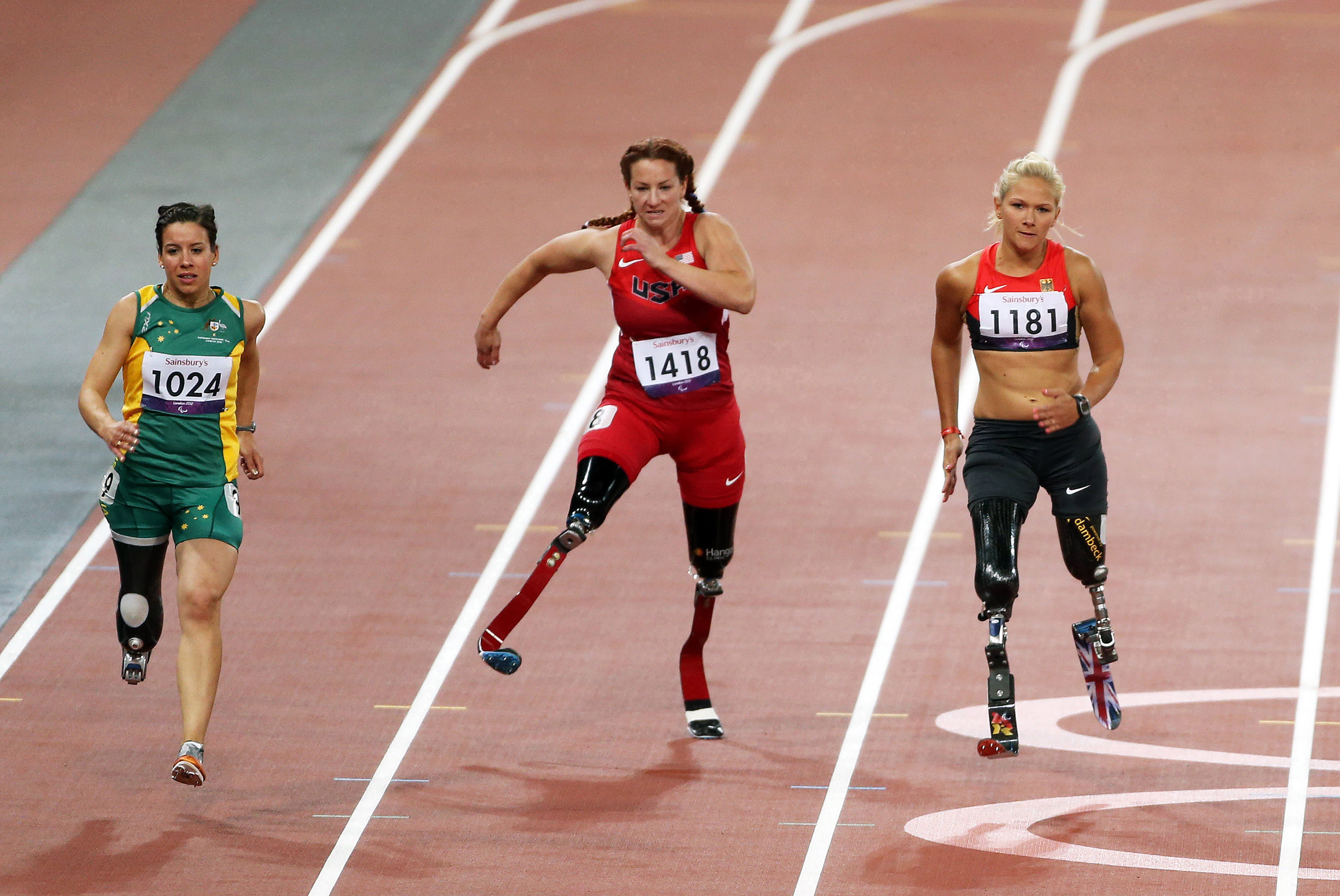
Errichiello (left) at the 2012 London Paralympics

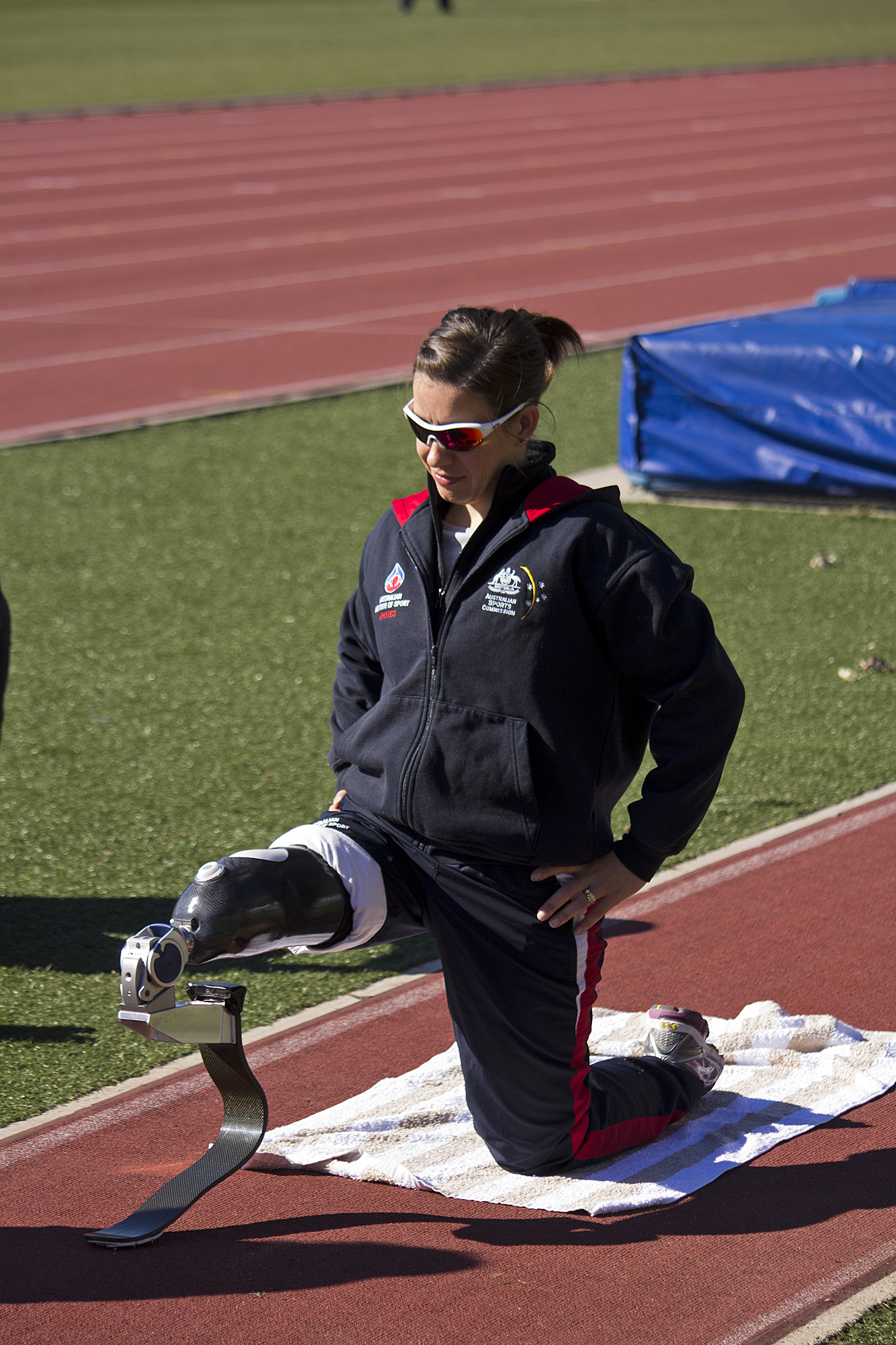
Paralympic athlete Michelle Errichiello warming up at the AIS Track and Field

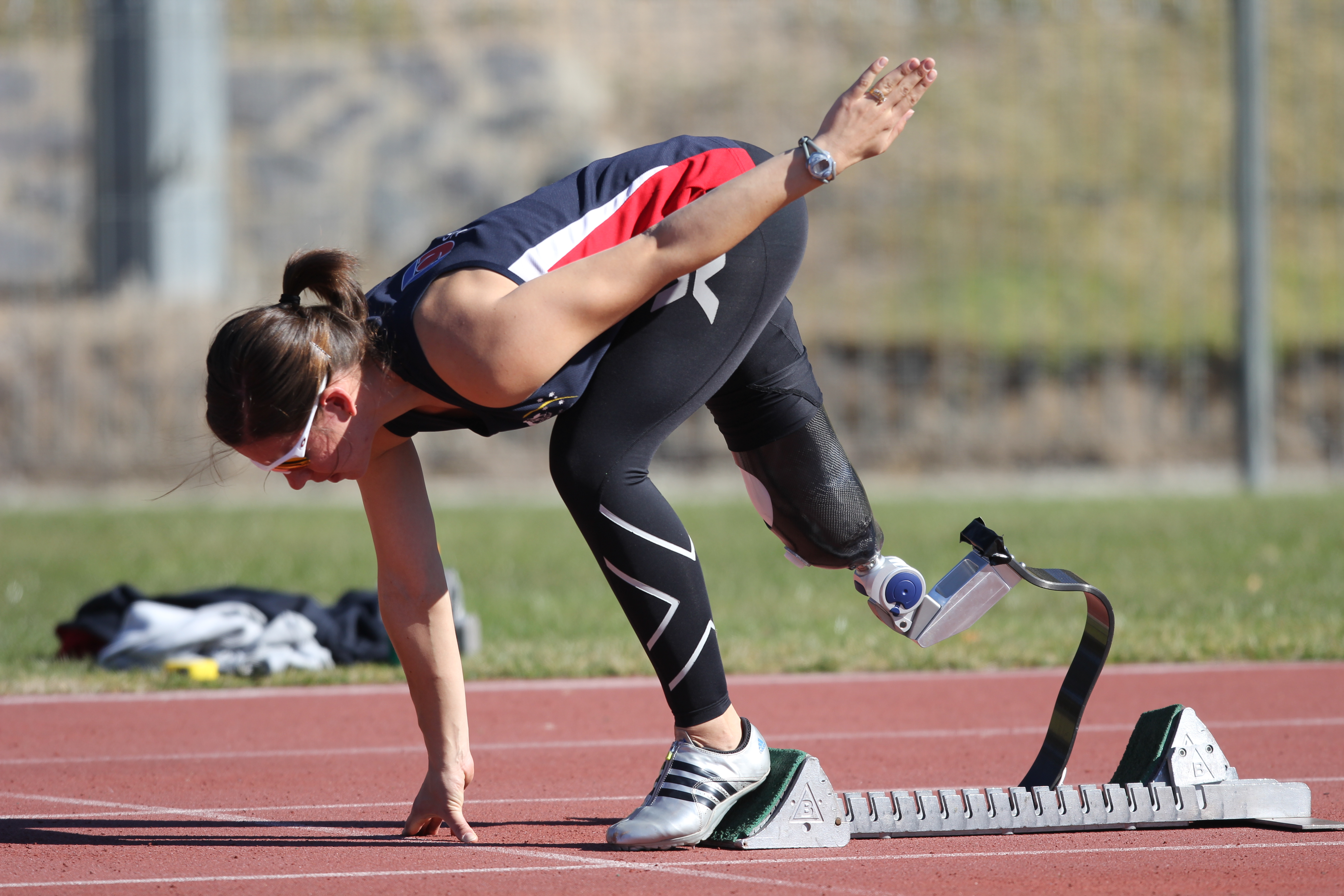
Michelle Errichiello at the AIS Track and Field

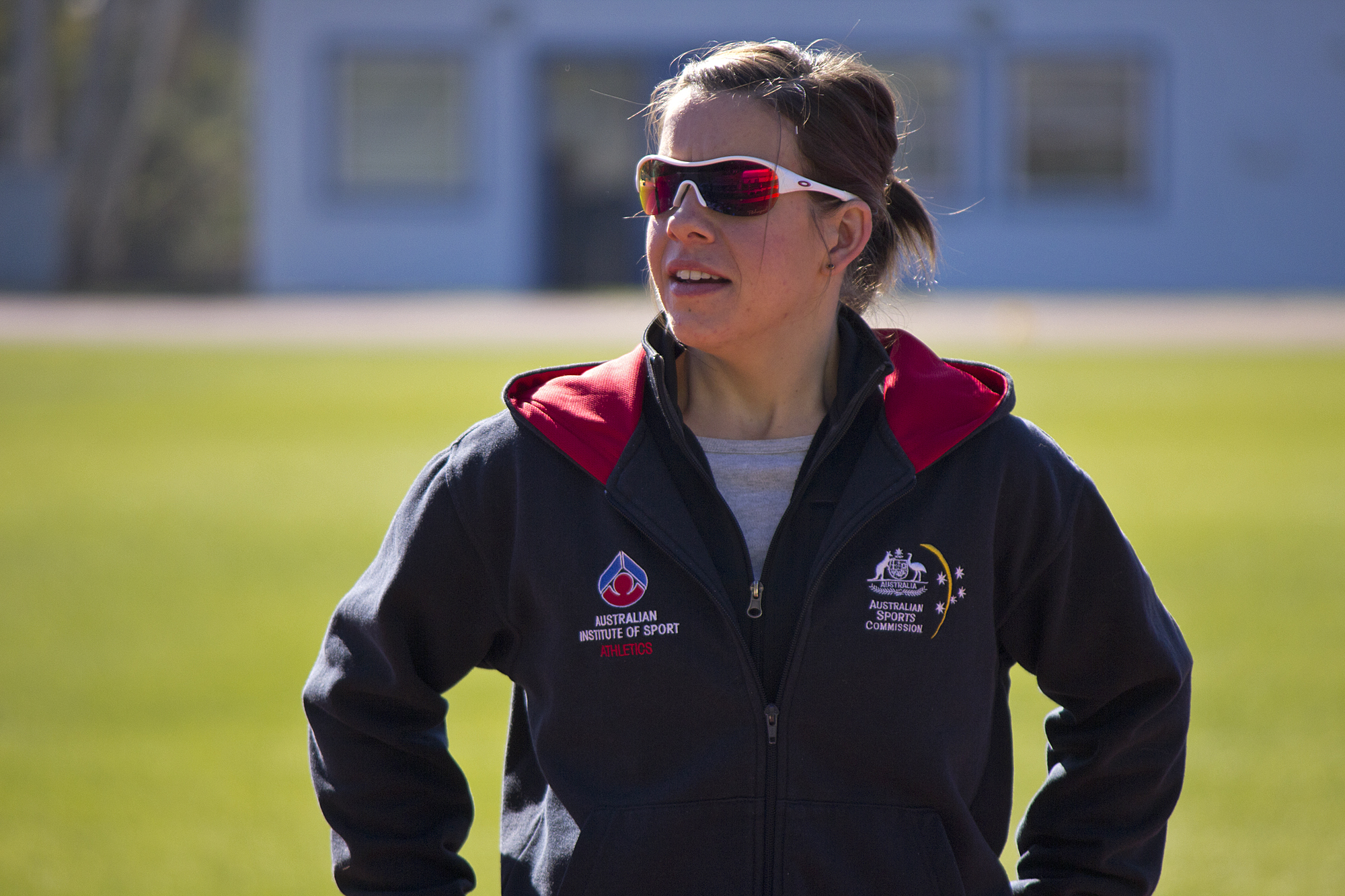
Paralympic athlete Michelle Errichiello at the AIS Track and Field

Errichiello is a T42 classified athlete. She has an athletics scholarship with the Australian Institute of Sport and is coached by Iryna Dvoskina.

Prior to her accident, Errichiello jogged occasionally for pleasure but was not competitively involved with the sport. Her first athletics competition was an inter-club meet in October 2008. Her first coach was Tim Matthews. At her first competitive athletics meet, she set a world record in the 200 metre event. She first represented Australia in 2009 at the Arufura Games. In 2010, she was named the Athlete of the Year by Athletics Essendon. At the 2010 National Championships in Perth, she broke the world record in the 100 metre event. She finished fourth at the 2011 World Championships in the 100 metre event. She was selected to represent Australia at the 2012 Summer Paralympics in athletics. The Games were her first. She did not medal at the 2012 Games.
