= Redenção do Gurguéia =

Coordinates: 9.48694°S 44.5858°W

- Municipality
- Country: Brazil
- Region: Northeast
- State: Piauí
- Mesoregion: Sudoeste Piauiense

Population (2020)
  - Total: 8,796
- Time zone: UTC−3 (BRT)
- Postal code: 64915/000
- Area code: +55 89

Redenção do Gurguéia is a municipality in the state of Piauí in the Northeast region of Brazil.

== See also ==
- List of municipalities in Piauí
