= Antônio Delfino de Souza =

Brazilian Paralympic athlete (born 1971)

Antônio Souza
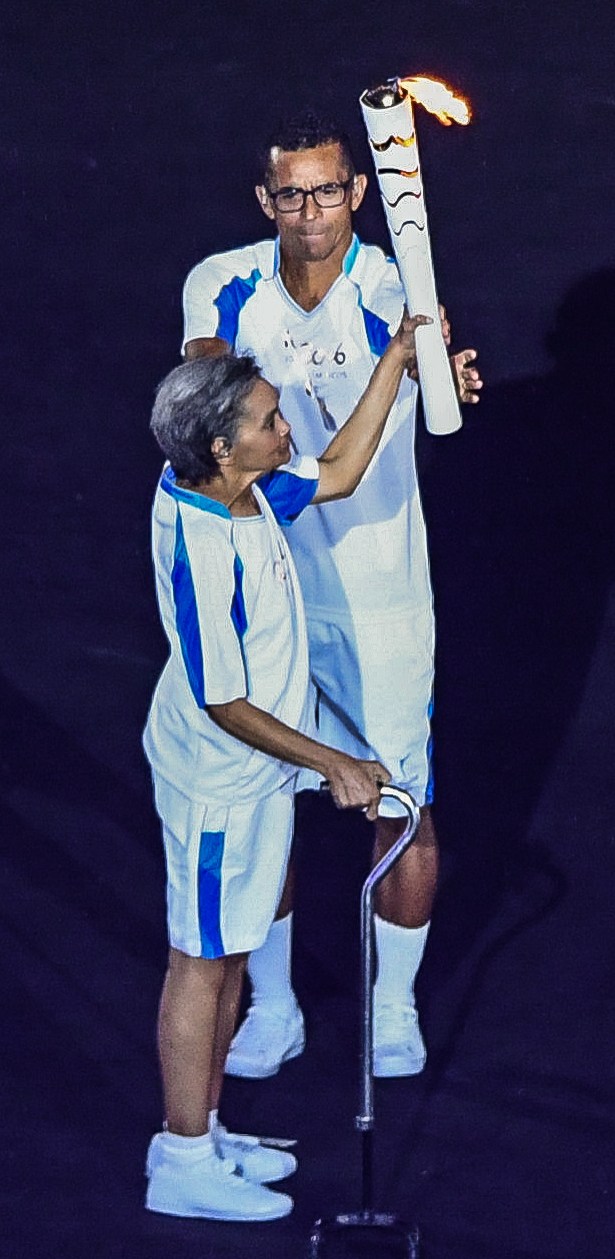
- Delfino (back) at the 2016 Paralympics

Personal information
- Full name: Antônio Delfino de Souza
- Born: 11 August 1971 (age 55) Redenção do Gurguéia, Brazil
- Height: 174 cm (5 ft 9 in)
- Weight: 69 kg (152 lb)

Sport
- Sport: Para athletics
- Disability class: T46
- Event: Sprint
Medal record
Representing Brazil
Paralympic Games
Gold medal – first place	2004 Athens	200 m T46
Gold medal – first place	2004 Athens	400 m T46
Silver medal – second place	2000 Sydney	400 m T46
Parapan American Games
Silver medal – second place	2007 Rio de Janeiro	100 m T46
Silver medal – second place	2007 Rio de Janeiro	200 m T46

Antônio Delfino de Souza (born 11 August 1971) is a retired paralympic sprinter from Brazil. At the age of 17 de Souza had his right hand amputated after an accident at agricultural works. In 1992, he moved to Brasília, where he took up sprint running. He competed in T46 sprint events at the 2000, 2004, 2008 and 2012 Paralympics and won two gold and one silver medal in 2000 and 2004. He was selected as a final Paralympic torch bearer at the 2016 Summer Paralympics opening ceremony.
