= Munawar Hussain =

Pakistani cricket umpire (1914–2003)

Personal information
- Born: 13 August 1914; Lahore, Pakistan
- Died: 26 March 2003 (aged 88)

Umpiring information
- Tests umpired: 5 (1959–1969)
- Source: Cricinfo, 13 July 2013

Munawar Hussain (13 August 1914 – 26 March 2003) was a Pakistani cricket umpire. Born in Lahore, he stood in five Test matches between 1959 and 1969.

The first Test in Karachi (October 24–27, 1969) during New Zealand's tour of Pakistan in 1969-70 was the last international match that Munawar Hussain stood in as an umpire.

== See also ==
- List of Test cricket umpires
