= Tim Matthews (athlete) =

Australian Paralympic athlete

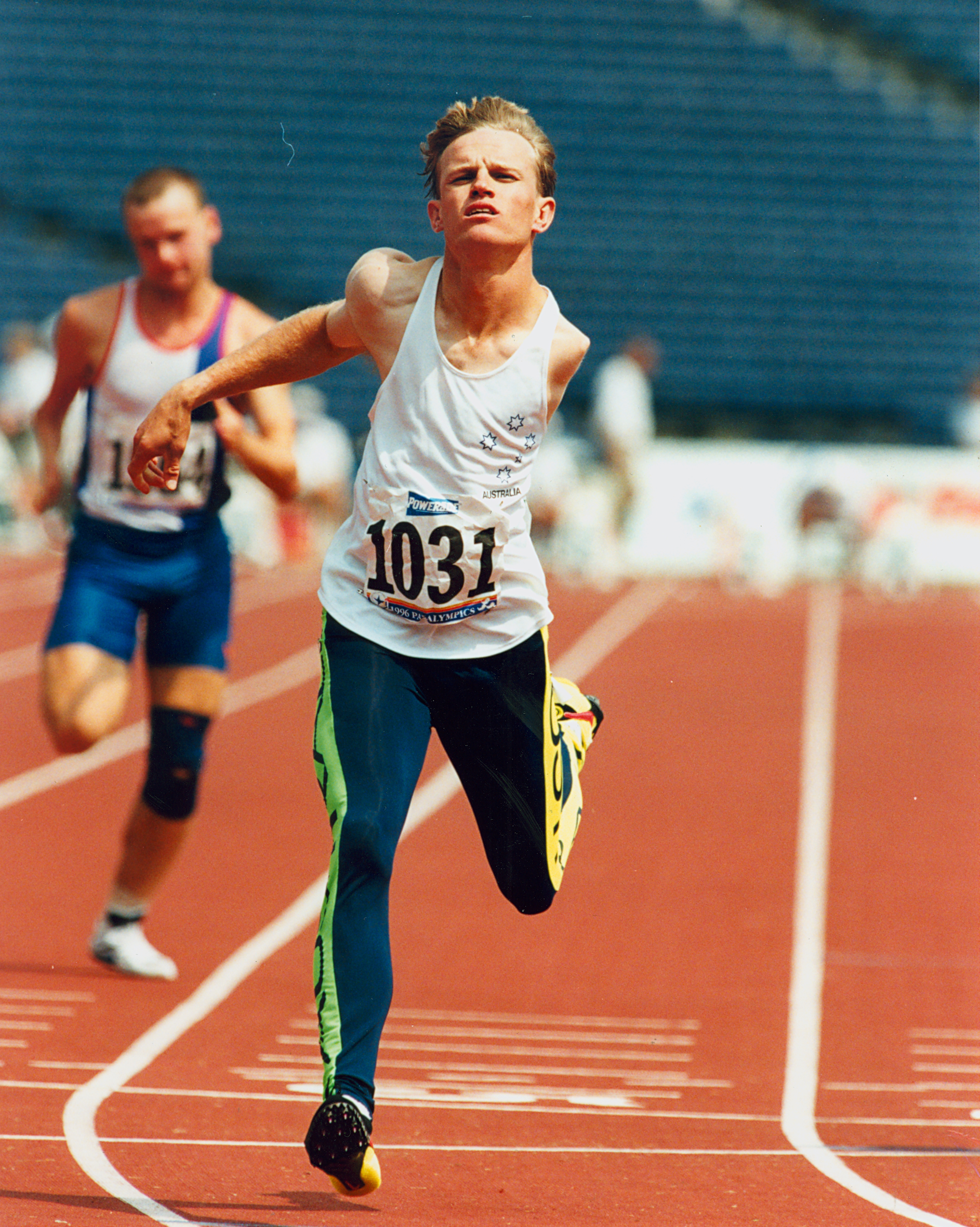
- Matthews finishing his race at the 1996 Atlanta Paralympics

Personal information
- Full name: Timothy Shaun Matthews
- Nationality: Australia
- Born: 29 October 1974 (age 51) Orbost, Victoria, Australia
Medal record
Athletics
Paralympic Games
Gold medal – first place	1996 Atlanta	Men's 4x100 m relay T42-46
Gold medal – first place	2000 Sydney	Men's 4x100 m relay T46
Gold medal – first place	2000 Sydney	Men's 4x400 m relay T46
Bronze medal – third place	2000 Sydney	Men's 100 m T46
Bronze medal – third place	2000 Sydney	Men's 200 m T46
IPC Athletics World Championships
Gold medal – first place	1998 Birmingham	Men's 4 x 400 m T42-46
Bronze medal – third place	1998 Birmingham	Men's 100 m T46

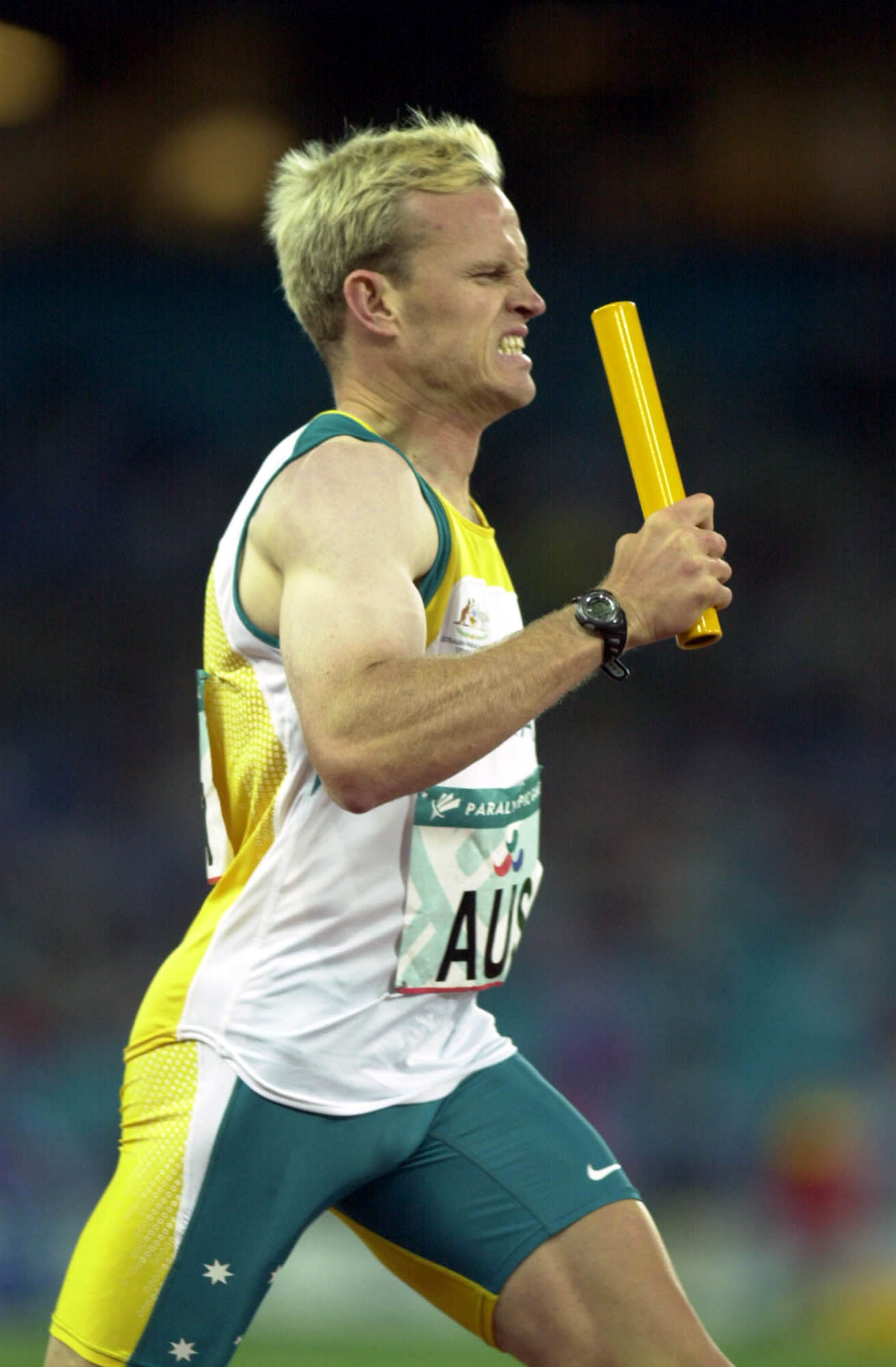
Matthews during the 4 x 400 m T46 relay at the 2000 Summer Paralympics. He and his teammates (Stephen Wilson, Neil Fuller and Heath Francis) won gold in this event.

Timothy "Tim" Shaun Matthews, OAM (born 29 October 1974) is an Australian Paralympic athlete. He was born in the Victorian town of Orbost with exomphalos, a condition in which the abdomen develops outside the body; in his case, the condition affected other organs, including his liver. he was also born without a left arm and with some webbed fingers. He spent much of his early life at Melbourne's Royal Children's Hospital because the membrane protecting his exposed organs ruptured when he was two days old.

At the 1996 Atlanta Paralympics, he won a gold medal in the Men's 4x100 m Relay T42-46 event, for which he received a Medal of the Order of Australia. At the 2000 Sydney Games, he won gold medals and broke world records in the men's 4x100 m relay T46 and men's 4x400 m relay T46 events and bronze medals in the men's 100 m T46 and men's 200 m T46 events. That year, he received an Australian Sports Medal. At the 2004 Athens Games, he came seventh in the first heat of the Men's 100 m T46 - event and did not make the final.

Since 2008, Matthews has been the Australian Paralympic Committee's Manager for Pathways and Development. As part of this role, he manages the APC's Paralympic Talent Search program in Victoria and Tasmania.

He coaches 2012 Paralympians Kelly Cartwright, Katy Parrish and Jack Swift, and is former coach of Paralympian Michelle Errichiello.

In 2024, Paralympics Australia awarded Mathews the Australian Paralympic Medal. In 2025, he was awarded the Victorian Instute of Sport Frank Pyke Achievement Award.
