= Wojtek Czyz =

Para badminton player for New Zealand and former para athletics competitor for Germany

Personal information
- Nationality: German
- Born: 30 July 1980 (age 46) Wodzisław Śląski, Poland
Medal record
Men's para athletics
Representing Germany
Paralympic Games
Gold medal – first place	2004 Athens	Long jump F42/F44
Gold medal – first place	2004 Athens	100m T42
Gold medal – first place	2004 Athens	200m T42
Gold medal – first place	2008 Beijing	Long jump F42/F44
Silver medal – second place	2012 London	Long jump F42/44
Bronze medal – third place	2012 London	100m T42
Bronze medal – third place	2012 London	Men's 4x100m Relay - T42/T46
IPC Athletics World Championships
Gold medal – first place	2006 Assen	Long jump F42
Gold medal – first place	2006 Assen	100m T42
Gold medal – first place	2006 Assen	200m T42
Silver medal – second place	2011 Christchurch	Long jump F42
IWAS World Games
Gold medal – first place	2009 Bangalore	Long jump F42
Gold medal – first place	2009 Bangalore	100m T42
Gold medal – first place	2009 Bangalore	Long jump F42
Gold medal – first place	2009 Bangalore	100m T42
Gold medal – first place	2009 Bangalore	200m T42
Men's para-badminton
Representing New Zealand
Oceania Championships
Gold medal – first place	2023 Perth	Men's doubles
Silver medal – second place	2023 Perth	Men's singles

Wojtek Czyz (born 30 July 1980) is a German para badminton player representing New Zealand and former para athletics competitor from the Polish part of Silesia.

In 2001, he was an aspiring professional football player and had just signed terms with SC Fortuna Köln. He ran for a loose ball, when the opposing goalkeeper rammed his knee, causing multiple fractures and compartment syndrome. According to Czyz, the injury was gravely underestimated due to professional failure. Due to delays in treatment, his leg had to be amputated. However, Czyz rebounded and established himself as one of the most successful German athletes in the T/F42 class for above-knee amputees.

== Career ==
=== Athletics success ===
Eleven months after his amputation, at the German Championships in 2002, Czyz broke the national record for F42 long jump and won the T42 100m event.

He won triple gold medals at the 2004 Paralympics. He won the 100 m and the 200 m dash the long jump for leg amputees, setting World Records in the latter two. In the European Championship of 2005, he repeated his triple crown, winning each discipline again. At the 2006 IPC Athletics World Championships he again won triple gold medals.

As of January 2013, Czyz is the world record holder in the Men's F42 Long Jump event. He has broken his own world mark several times. He beat his 2008 Paralympics record twice at the 2009 IWAS World Games, but wind assistance invalidated both jumps.

=== Para-badminton ===
Czyz moved to New Zealand in 2019 and took up para-badminton two years later. In May 2024, Czyz was named as New Zealand's first-ever badminton representative for the Summer Paralympics.

== Personal life ==
As of September 2012, Czyz was a sport student in Cologne. His personal motto is "Don't think of what you were, but of what you are and of what you aspire to be" ("Denk nicht an das was du warst, sondern an das, was du bist und zu sein dich sehnst"). After his sports career, Czyz sailed around the world with his wife Elena Brambilla to help amputees to get prosthetics for free and teach them how to walk with the project sailing4handicaps. After the project, Czyz and Brambilla set up a mānuka honey company called Manuka Royale in New Zealand where they dedicate their passion for nature.

Czyz now lives in the Hamilton settlement of Eureka with his wife and son and in Germany.

== Para-badminton statistics ==
Wojtek Czyz
Sport
- Country: New Zealand
- Sport: Badminton
- Handedness: Right

Men's singles SL3 Men's doubles SL3–SL4
- Highest ranking: 12 (MS 18 June 2024); 13 (MD with Abhijeet Sakhuja 23 April 2024)
- Current ranking: 14 (WS); 21 (MD with Abhijeet Sakhuja) (24 September 2024)
- BWF profile

=== Oceania Championships ===
Men's singles SL3

Year	Venue	Opponent	Score	Result
2023	Mandurah Aquatic and Recreation Centre, Perth, Australia	(New Zealand) Corrie Robinson	9–21, 8–21	Silver

Men's doubles SL3–SL4

Year	Venue	Partner	Opponent	Score	Result
2023	Mandurah Aquatic and Recreation Centre, Perth, Australia	(New Zealand) Corrie Robinson	(Papua New Guinea) Jerome Bunge (Papua New Guinea) Laho Maiauka	21–3, 21–4	Gold
2023	Mandurah Aquatic and Recreation Centre, Perth, Australia	(New Zealand) Corrie Robinson	(Australia) Kenneth Adlawan (Australia) Lachlan Boulton	21–9, 21–13	Gold
2023	Mandurah Aquatic and Recreation Centre, Perth, Australia	(New Zealand) Corrie Robinson	(New Zealand) Oliver Linton (Papua New Guinea) Danny Ten	21–6, 21–6	Gold

=== BWF Para Badminton World Circuit (2 runners-up) ===
The BWF Para Badminton World Circuit – Grade 2, Level 1, 2 and 3 tournaments has been sanctioned by the Badminton World Federation from 2022.

Men's singles SL3

Year	Tournament	Level	Opponent	Score	Result
2023	Uganda Para-Badminton International	Level 3	(India) Chandra Prakash	19–21, 15–21	(silver) Runner-up

Men's doubles SL3–SL4

Year	Tournament	Level	Partner	Opponent	Score	Result
2023	Uganda Para-Badminton International	Level 3	(India) Abhijeet Sakhuja	(India) Chandra Prakash (India) Naveen Sivakumar	21–14, 15–21, 17–21	(silver) Runner-up

== See also ==
- The Mechanics of Running Blades
