= Danny Andrews =

American Paralympic athlete

Medal record

Track and field (athletics)

Representing United States

Paralympic Games
Gold medal – first place	2000 Sydney	800 metres - T44
Gold medal – first place	2004 Athens	400 metres - T44
Gold medal – first place	2004 Athens	4x100 metre relay - T42-46
Gold medal – first place	2004 Athens	4x400 metre relay - T42-46

Danny Andrews is a paralympic athlete from the United States competing mainly in category T44 sprint events.

Andrews competed in the 800m at the 2000 Summer Paralympics but it was in moving down in distance in the 2004 Summer Paralympics that he won three Paralymipc gold medals in the 400m, 4 × 100 m and 4 × 400 m as well as competing in the 200m. In the 2008 Summer Paralympics he competed in the 200m and 400m but could not match the success of four years earlier and ended up without any medals. This was in part due to an injury that occurred from a collision during the warmups for the 400m Finals.
