= Marcos Dueñas =

Spanish Paralympic athlete

Personal information
- Full name: Marcos Francisco Dueñas Jimeno
- Born: 9 April 1978 (age 48) Granada, Spain
Medal record
Men's para-athletics
Representing Spain
Paralympic Games
Silver medal – second place	2000 Sydney	4×400 m relay T46

Marcos Francisco Dueñas Jimeno (born 9 April 1978 in Granada) is a paralympic athlete from Spain competing mainly in category T44 sprint events.

Marcos was part of the Spanish team that travelled to the 1996 Summer Paralympics in Atlanta where he competed in the 100m, 200m and long jump. He was also part of the team that travelled to Sydney for the 2000 Summer Paralympics again competing in the 100m and 200m as well as the 4 × 100 m and part of the Spanish silver medal-winning 4 × 400 m T46 relay team.
