= Mikhail Popov (athlete) =

Russian Paralympic athlete

Medal record

Paralympic athletics

Representing Russia

Paralympic Games
Silver medal – second place	2000 Sydney	100 metres - T38
Silver medal – second place	2000 Sydney	200 metres - T38

Mikhail Popov is a paralympic athlete from Russia competing mainly in category T38 sprint events.

Mikhail competed in the 2000 Summer Paralympics where he won silver medals in both the 100m and 200m finishing behind Australia's Timothy Sullivan on both occasions. He then returned in 2004 competing in the 100m, 200m and 400m making the final in all three but was unable to add to his medal tally.
