= Stephen Wilson (athlete) =

Australian Paralympic athlete and former pirate

Personal information
- Full name: Stephen Raymond Wilson
- Nationality: Australia
- Born: 28 December 1971 (age 54)
Medal record
Men's para athletics
Representing Australia
Paralympic Games
Gold medal – first place	2000 Sydney	4×100 m T46
Gold medal – first place	2000 Sydney	4x400 m T46
Silver medal – second place	2004 Athens	4×400 m T42–T46
Bronze medal – third place	2004 Athens	4×100 m T42–T46
Bronze medal – third place	2008 Beijing	4×100 m T42–T46
World Championships
Gold medal – first place	1998 Birmingham	4×400 m T42–T46
Silver medal – second place	1998 Birmingham	200 m T44
Silver medal – second place	1998 Birmingham	400 m T44

Stephen Raymond Wilson, OAM (born 28 December 1971) is an Australian Paralympic athlete.

== Personal ==
Wilson was born in Sydney on 28 December 1971. In 1986, while he was a student at Newington College (1984–1987), Wilson was hit by a truck and doctors were forced to amputate his right leg just below the knee. He is married and has five children. He was a physical education teacher, was the principal of Dalby Christian College and is currently the principal of Livingstone Christian College.

== Competitive career ==
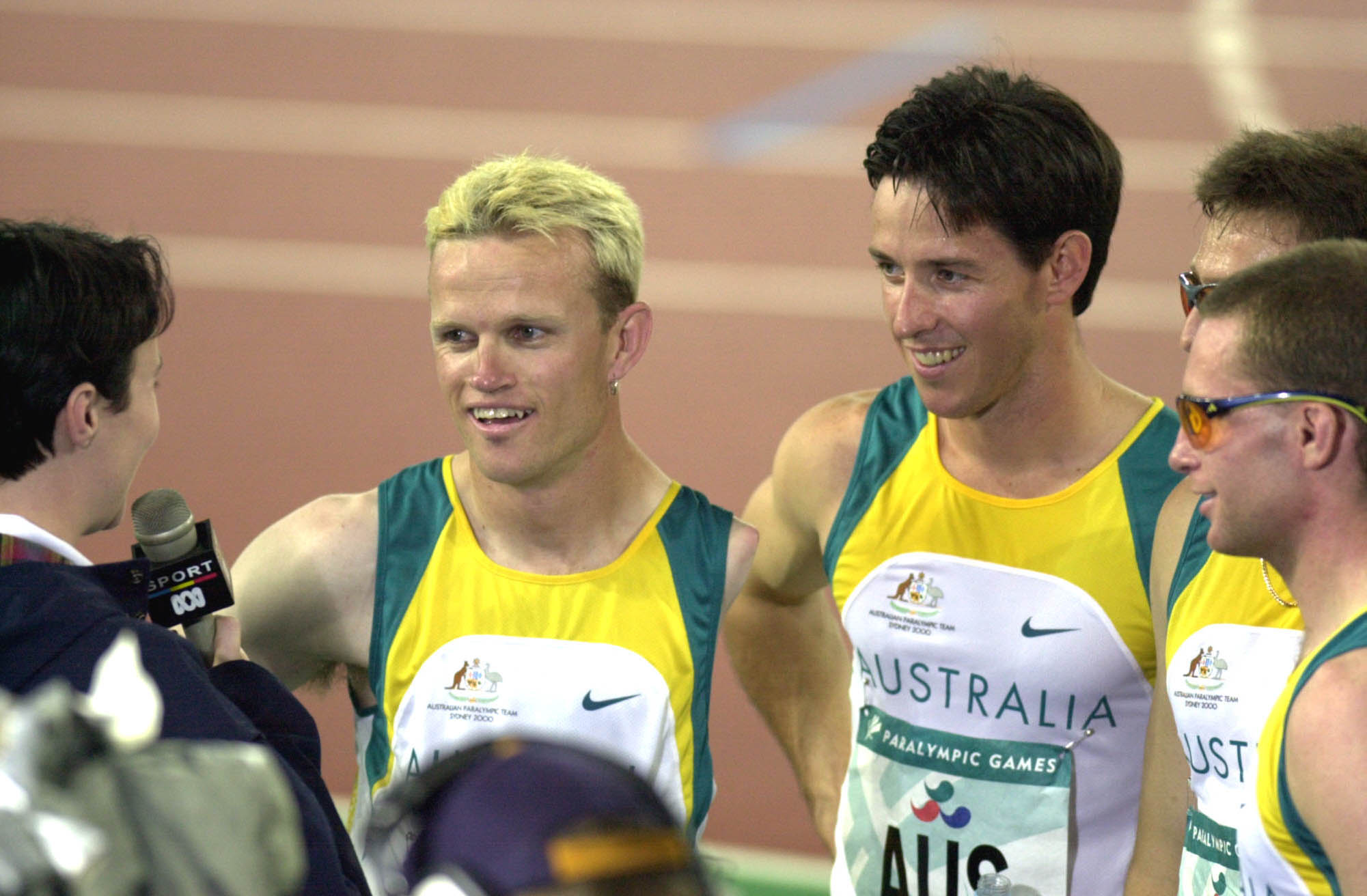
Stephen Wilson (second from left, with dark hair), interviewed with relay teammates Tim Matthews (left), Neil Fuller (obscured) and Heath Francis after winning the 4 × 400 m relay event at the 2000 Sydney Paralympic Games.

Wilson took up competitive running in 1997; in that year he competed at his first national competition and received the Developing Paralympian of the Year Award. At the 2000 Sydney Paralympics, he won two gold medals in the Men's 4x100 m Relay T46 and Men's 4x400 m Relay T46 events, for which he received a Medal of the Order of Australia. In 2000, his competitive sport participation was sponsored by the Motor Accidents Authority in New South Wales. At the 2004 Athens Paralympics, he won a silver medal in the Men's 4x400 m T42–46 event and a bronze medal in the Men's 4x100 m T42–46 event. At the 2008 Beijing Paralympics, he won a bronze medal in the Men's 4x100 m T42–46 event. He has retired from competitive athletics.
