= Stefano Lippi =

Italian Paralympic athlete (born 1981)

Medal record

Men's para athletics

Representing Italy

Paralympic Games
Silver medal – second place	2004 Athens	Long jump - F42

Stefano Lippi (born 23 January 1981) is a Paralympic athlete from Italy competing mainly in category T42 sprint and long jump events.

== Biography ==
Stefano has competed at two Paralympics. His first was in 2004 where he competed in the 100m, 200m and 4 × 100 m relay and won a silver medal in the F42 long jump. His second games were in 2008 where he competed in the log jump and 100m but was unable to win a second medal.
