= Wu Faqi =

Chinese Paralympic sprinter

Medal record

Track and field (athletics)

Representing China

Paralympic Games
Bronze medal – third place	2004 Athens	400 metres - T46

Wu Faqi is a paralympic athlete from China competing mainly in category T46 sprint events.

Wu Faqi was part of the Chinese team at the 2004 Summer Paralympics winning a bronze medal in the individual 400m, he was also a part of the Chinese relay teams in the 4 × 100 m and 4 × 400 m as well as competing in the individual 200m.
