= Gilberto Alavez =

Mexican Paralympic athlete

Medal record

Paralympic athletics

Representing Mexico

Paralympic Games
Silver medal – second place	2000 Sydney	800 metres - T44

Gilberto Alavez is a Mexican paralympic athlete, competing mainly in category T44 cycling sprint and middle-distance events.

Gilberto won a silver medal in the 800m at the 2000 Summer Paralympics where he also competed in the 400m. A move to shorter distances in the 2004 Summer Paralympics proved unsuccessful as he failed to medal in the 100m, 400m or the 4 × 400 m.

Alavez won the paratriathlon race at the 2013 World Triathlon Duathlon Championships in Canada.

== Personal life ==
Alavez hails from San Juan Atepec, Oaxaca. As of 2013, he lived in Los Angeles.
