= Serge Ornem =

French Paralympic athlete

Medal record

Men's para athletics

Representing France

Paralympic Games
Silver medal – second place	2000 Sydney	4x100m - T46
Silver medal – second place	2004 Athens	4x100m - T42-46

Serge Ornem is a Paralympian athlete from France competing mainly in category T46 sprint events.

Serge has competed in the 2000, 2004 and 2008 Summer Paralympics always in the T46 100m, 200m and 4 × 100 m relay. He has been part of the silver medal-winning relay teams in both the 2000 and 2004 games.
