= Dominique André =

French Paralympic athlete

Medal record

Men's para athletics

Representing France

Paralympic Games
Silver medal – second place	2000 Sydney	4x100m - T46
Silver medal – second place	2004 Athens	4x100m - T42-46
Bronze medal – third place	2000 Sydney	4x400m - T46
Bronze medal – third place	2004 Athens	4x100m - T42-46

Dominique André is a Paralympic athlete from France competing mainly in category T44 sprint events.

Dominique has competed at two Paralympics, in 2000 and in 2004. On both occasions he has competed in the individual 100 metres and 200 metres races, but it has been for his part in the French relay teams that he has won his medals. He has two silver medals from his participation in the 4 × 100 metres relay teams and two bronze medals from the 4 × 400 metres relay teams.
