= Marcus Ehm =

German Paralympic athlete

Medal record

Paralympic athletics

Representing Germany

Paralympic Games
Silver medal – second place	2000 Sydney	400 metres - T44
Bronze medal – third place	2000 Sydney	200 metres - T44
Bronze medal – third place	2000 Sydney	4x100 metre relay - T46

Marcus Ehm (born 7 June 1972) is a paralympic athlete from Germany competing mainly in category T44 sprint events. He is also a politician.

== Biography ==
Marcus Ehm competed in all the individual T44 sprint and relay events in the 2000 Summer Paralympics winning a silver in the 400m and bronze medals in the 200m and the 4 × 400 m. At the 2004 Summer Paralympics he competed in the individual sprints, Germany not entering relay teams, but could not win any medals this time.

Since 2018 Ehm is mayor of Sigmaringen, his city of birth.
