= Don Elgin =

Australian Paralympic athlete

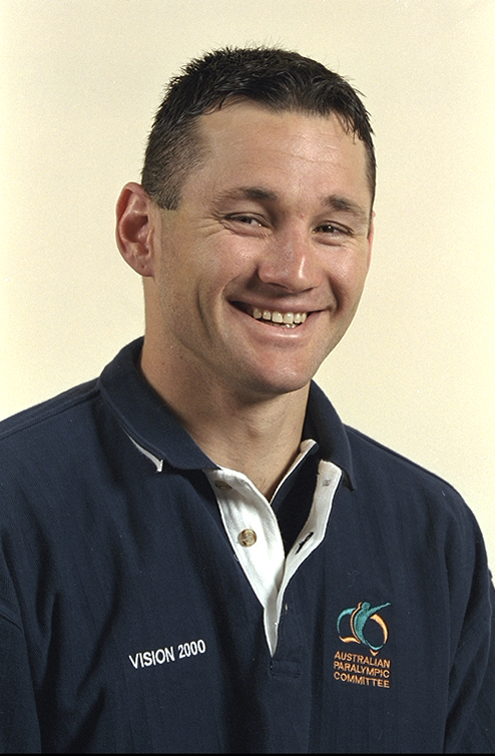
- 2000 Australian Paralympic team portrait of Elgin

Personal information
- Full name: Donald James William Elgin
- Nationality: Australia
- Born: 19 December 1975 (age 50) Donald, Victoria
- Height: 178 cm (70 in)
- Weight: 80 kg (180 lb)

Sport
- Club: Sandringham
Medal record
Athletics
Paralympic Games
Silver medal – second place	2004 Athens	Men's 4x400 m T42–46
Bronze medal – third place	2000 Sydney	Men's Pentathlon P44
Bronze medal – third place	2004 Athens	Men's 4x100 m T42–46
Bronze medal – third place	2004 Athens	Men's Pentathlon P44
IPC Athletics World Championships
Gold medal – first place	1994 Berlin	Men's 4x100 m Relay
Silver medal – second place	2002 Lille	Men's Pentathlon
Silver medal – second place	2002 Lille	Men's 4x400 m relay
Bronze medal – third place	1994 Berlin	Men's High Jump
Bronze medal – third place	2002 Lille	Men's 4x100 m relay

Donald James William Elgin (born 19 December 1975) is an Australian Paralympic amputee track and field athlete who won four medals at three Paralympics.

== Personal ==
Elgin was born on 19 December 1975 in the Victorian town of Donald. He was born without a left leg and a left thumb, with small toes, and webbed fingers on both hands; his malformed left foot was amputated shortly after he was born and he had open heart surgery at the age of three. He was raised in the New South Wales town of Tocumwal, and competed in athletics and swimming as a teenager. He lives in Melbourne with his wife, three daughters and a son. He is the Founder and managing director of StarAmp Global, a boutique management company that specialises in managing and supporting paralympic competitors. He also works as a motivational speaker both in Australia and around the world.

== Sports career ==
It started off in 1990. I went along to the NSW [New South Wales] amputee championships. It was the first time I had been exposed to a group of people who were missing bits. Missing arms, missing legs. My first reaction was Wow! Have a look at this, it's like freak show, all these people! Then about half an hour into it, it dawned on me that these people were just like me. Here was this level playing field I suppose I wanted and desired so much.

— Don Elgin

Elgin first participated in sports for people with disabilities at the 1990 New South Wales Amputee Championships. His first international competition was the 1994 IPC Athletics World Championships in Berlin, where he won a gold medal in the 4x100 m relay and a bronze medal in the high jump. He participated without winning any medals at the 1996 Atlanta Paralympics and came fourth in the pentathlon at the 1998 IPC Athletics World Championships in Birmingham. At the 2000 Sydney Paralympics, he won a bronze medal in the Men's Pentathlon P44 event. At the 2002 IPC Athletics World Championships in Lille, he won two silver medals in the pentathlon and 4x400 m relay and a bronze medal in the 4x100 m relay. At the 2004 Athens Paralympics, he won a silver medal in the Men's 4x400 m T42–46 event and two bronze medals in the Men's 4x100 m T42–46 and Men's Pentathlon P44 events. He came sixth in the pentathlon at the 2006 IPC Athletics World Championships, where he was the Australian flag-bearer at the opening ceremony, and commentated at that year's Commonwealth Games in Melbourne. He retired from para-athletics in 2008, but made a comeback in 2013 after learning that the sport would be included in the 2014 Glasgow Commonwealth Games. He came eighth in the Men's Discus Throw F42/44 at the games.

He was coached by Roy Boyd, Cath Woodruff, John Eden, De Jennings, and Peter Negropontis. He held a scholarship from the Victorian Institute of Sport for 12 years. He is the team manager for the Australian Paralympic Athletics Team.

== Recognition ==
In 2000, Elgin received an Australian Sports Medal for "service to amputee sport", in particular "development of junior athletes and track and field". In November 2018, he was awarded the Victorian Institute of Sport Frank Pyke Achievement Award.

== Gallery ==
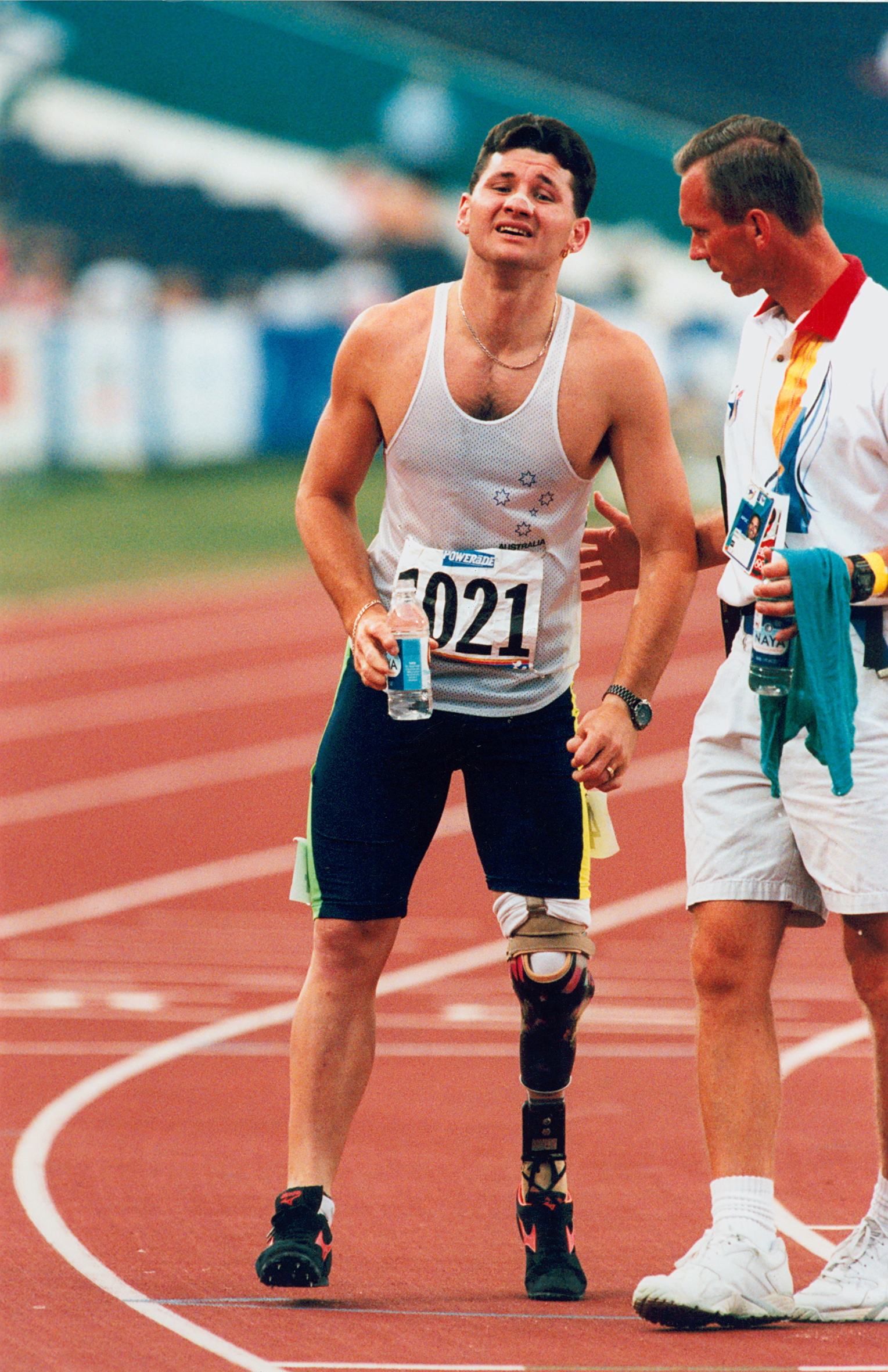
Australian athlete Don Elgin receives support from an official at the completion of one of the events in the pentathlon at the 1996 Atlanta Paralympic Games

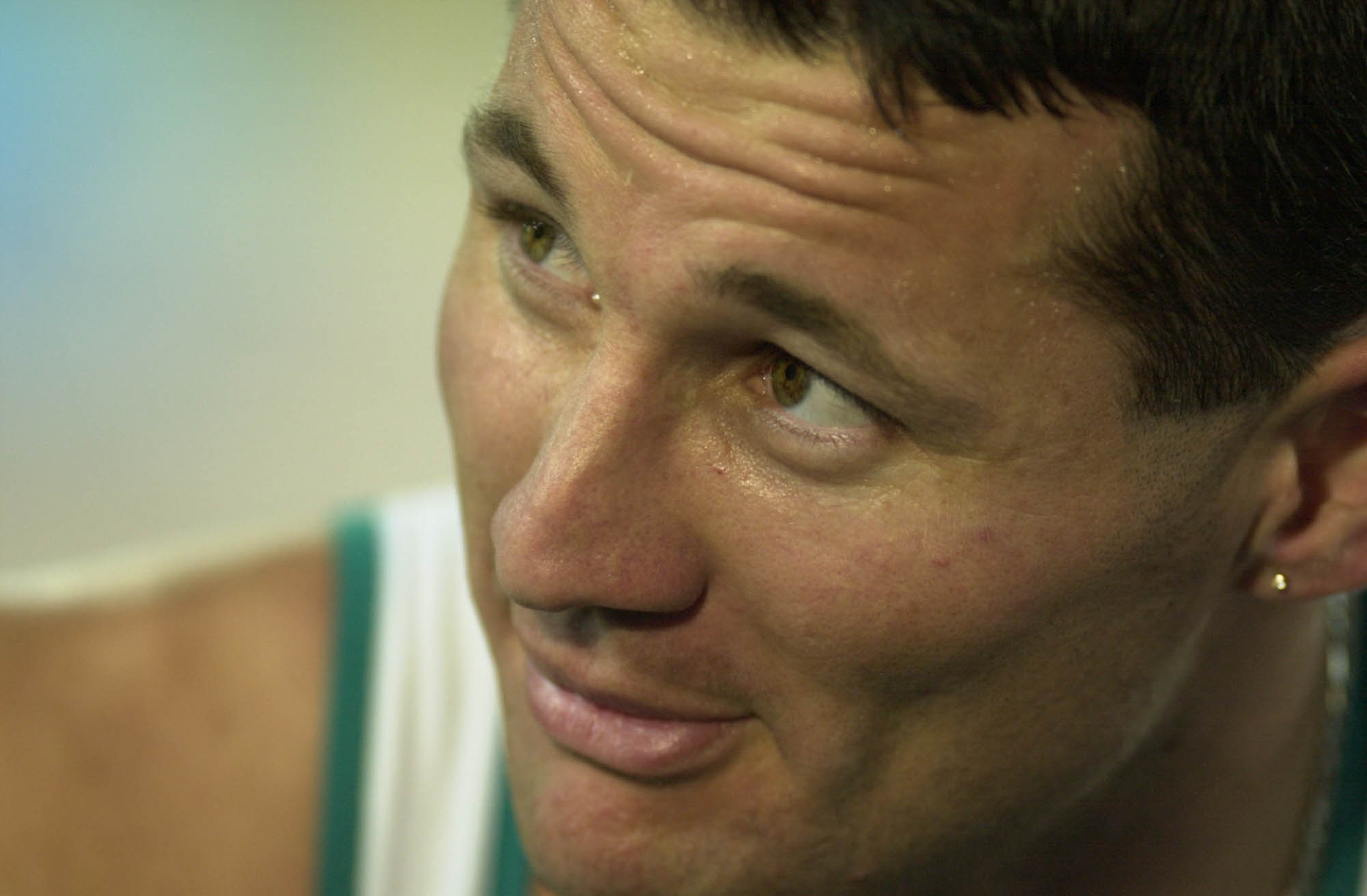
Close up of Elgin looking upwards during track competition at the 2000 Summer Paralympics

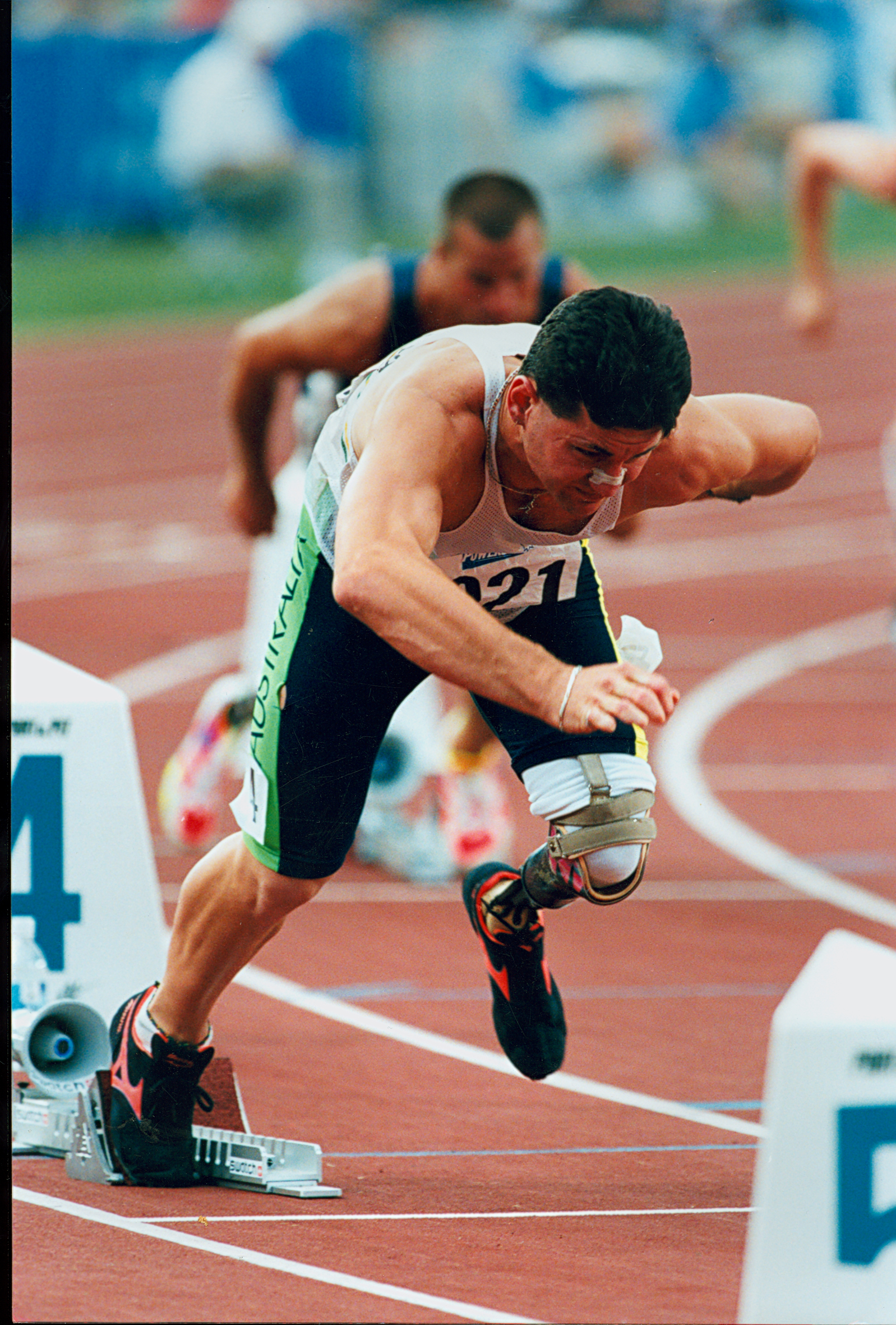
Elgin competing in the pentathlon at the 1996 Atlanta Paralympic Games

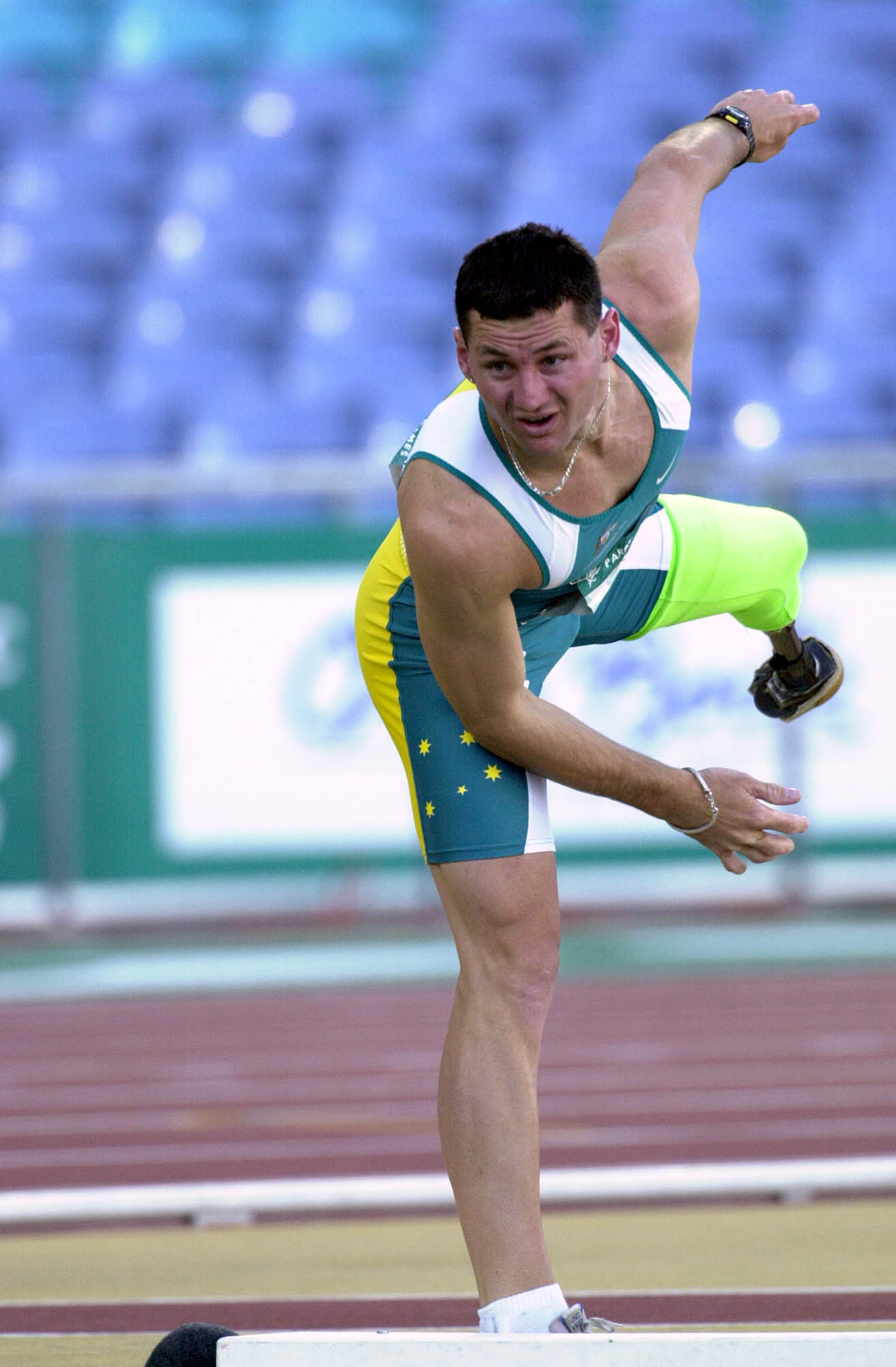
Elgin throwing the shot put at the 2000 Sydney Paralympics
