= Raphew Reed Jr. =

American Paralympic athlete

Personal information
- Full name: Raphew Tyrone Reed Jr.
- Nickname: Hurdle Don
- Nationality: American
- Born: 12 May 1985 (age 41) Baton Rouge, Louisiana, U.S.
- Height: 6 ft 3 in (191 cm)
- Weight: 185 lb (84 kg)

Sport
- Sport: Running
Medal record
Men's athletics (T42-T46)
Representing United States
Paralympic Games
| Gold medal – first place | 2004 Athens | 4x100 m Relay - (T42-T46) |
| Gold medal – first place | 2004 Athens | 4x400 m Relay WR - (T42-T46) |

Raphew Tyrone Reed Jr. is an American hurdler and double gold medal winner at the 2004 Summer Paralympics in the T42-T46 (amputees) category.

== Biography ==
Raphew Tyrone Jr. was born in Baton Rouge, Louisiana on 12 May 1985. His right arm did not fully develop when the amniotic band wrapped around the arm and suffocated it.

He started running track in the fifth grade for fun with his father, a former hurdler, training him.

Raphew attended Southern University Laboratory School where he lettered in Football, Track and Band. He was state runner up in the tenth grade and ran one of the fastest underclassmen times ever in 13.78 s. In 2002 Raphew was the Louisiana 1A Regional and State Champion in the 110m HH. In 2003 Raphew Placed 3rd in the AAU National Indoor Championships in the 60mH. He competed for the USA Paralympics team for the first time in June 2003. In the Athletics at the 2004 Summer Paralympics he was a member of the winning teams in both the 4 x 100 metres and 4 x 400 metres relays. He is ranked by the IAAF in the top ten hurdlers in the world, both indoor and outdoor, for 2005.

In 2003 Raphew signed a Track and Field scholarship from the University of Mississippi (Ole Miss) to run High Hurdles. He is majoring in International Business with a minor in Political Science.

He is the Founder of The Reed Foundation Inc. a Non profit charity developed to help those Children and adults (specializing in Military Veterans) with disabilities.

== Major Achievements ==
=== 2005 Achievements ===
- 2005: United States Track and Field 60m Hurdles Top Ten Demestic Ranking
- 2005: International Association of Athletics Federation 110m Hurdles Top 20 World Ranking
- 2005: AAU National Indoor Hurdle Champion

=== 2004 Achievements ===
- 2004: 4x400 relay World Record member in Athens, Greece at the Paralympic Games
- 2004: 4x400 Gold Medalist Athens, Greece at the Paralympic Games
- 2004: 4x100 Gold Medalist Athens, Greece at the Paralympic Games
- 2004: 400m 8th-place finish in Athens, Greece at the Paralympic Games
- 2004: 3rd Place Finish at the United States Olympic Trials in the Amputee Race
- 2004: Ranked Top Five in the World by International Paralympic Committee in the 100m, 200m, and 400m
- 2004: Placed 13 at the Southeastern Conference Outdoor Championships

=== 2003 Achievements ===
- 2003: United Stars Track Club All American
- 2003: Dyestat Track and Field Indoor and Outdoor All American
- 2003: Track and Field News All American
- 2003: AAU Indoor Hurdle Indoor All American

=== 2002 Achievements ===
- 2002: AAU Region 9-B 110m HH Champion
- 2002: Dystat Track and Field All American
- 2002: Louisiana All State First Team
- 2002: East Baton Rouge Parish First Team
- 2002: Louisiana State 110m High Hurdle champion
- 2002: District 6-1A Honorable Mention Place Kicker
- 2002: Southern University Laboratory Football Team

=== 2001 Achievements ===
- 2001: United States Track and Field Association 110m Hurdle Champion
- 2001: Louisiana State 110 High Hurdler Runner-up
- 2001: Dyestat Track and Field All American
