= Heath Francis =

Australian Paralympic athlete (born 1981)

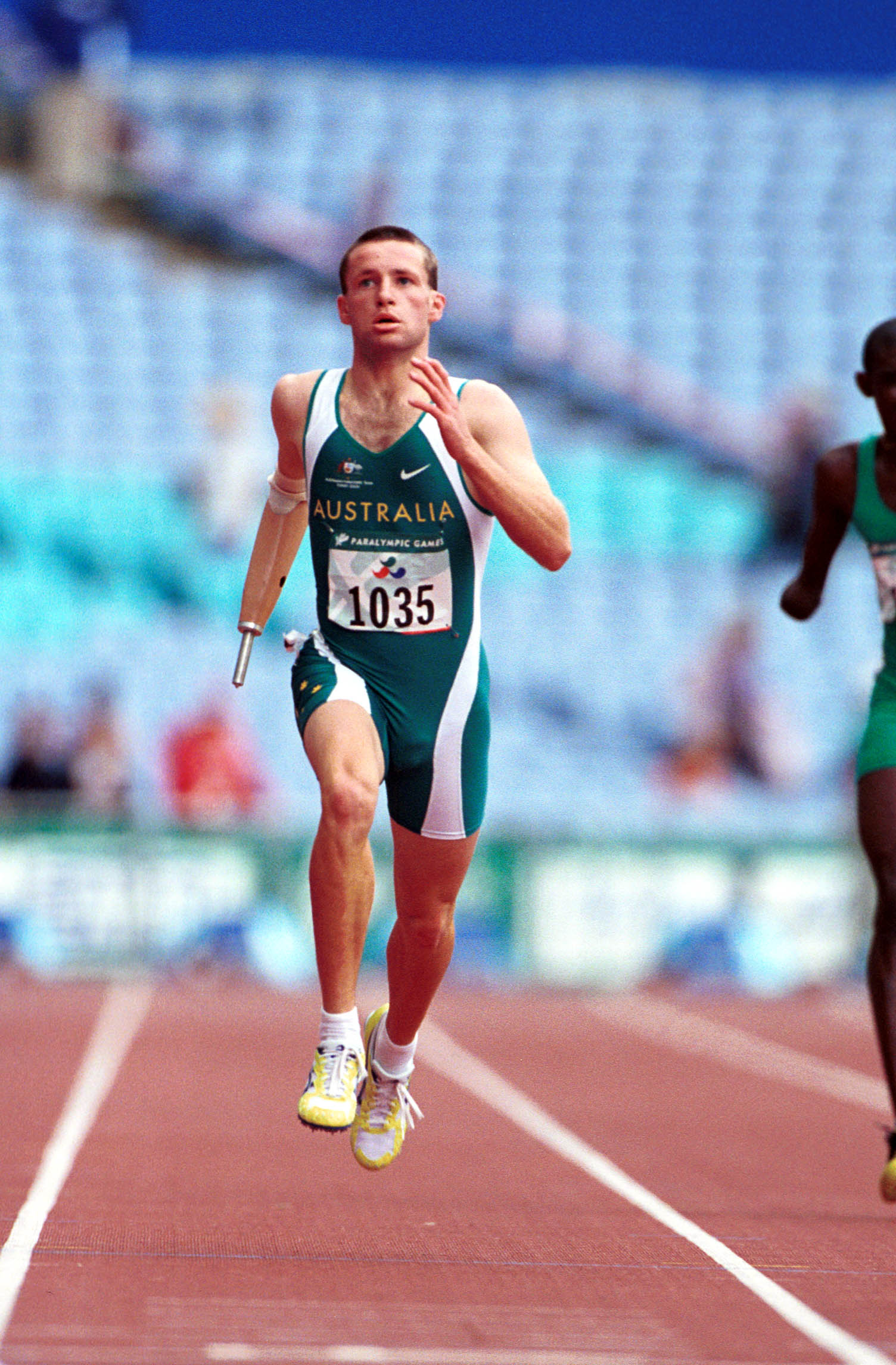
- Action shot of Francis during his gold medal run in the 400 m T46 at the 2000 Summer Paralympic's

Personal information
- Full name: Heath Wesley Francis
- Nationality: Australia
- Born: 16 November 1981 (age 44) Newcastle, New South Wales
Medal record
Representing Australia
Athletics
Paralympic Games
Gold medal – first place	2000 Sydney	Men's 400m T46
Gold medal – first place	2000 Sydney	Men's 4×100m T46
Gold medal – first place	2000 Sydney	Men's 4×400m T46
Gold medal – first place	2008 Beijing	Men's 100m T46
Gold medal – first place	2008 Beijing	Men's 200m T46
Gold medal – first place	2008 Beijing	Men's 400m T46
Silver medal – second place	2000 Sydney	Men's 200m T46
Silver medal – second place	2004 Athens	Men's 100m T46
Silver medal – second place	2004 Athens	Men's 400m T46
Silver medal – second place	2004 Athens	Men's 4×400m T42-T46
Bronze medal – third place	2004 Athens	Men's 200m T46
Bronze medal – third place	2004 Athens	Men's 4×100m T42-T46
Bronze medal – third place	2008 Beijing	Men's 4×100m T42–T46
IPC Athletics World Championships
Gold medal – first place	1998 Birmingham	Men's 4x400m Relay T42-46
Gold medal – first place	2006 Assen	Men's 100m T46
Gold medal – first place	2006 Assen	Men's 200m T46
Gold medal – first place	2006 Assen	Men's 400m T46
Silver medal – second place	2002 Lille	Men's 200m T46
Commonwealth Games
Gold medal – first place	2006 Melbourne	Men's 200m

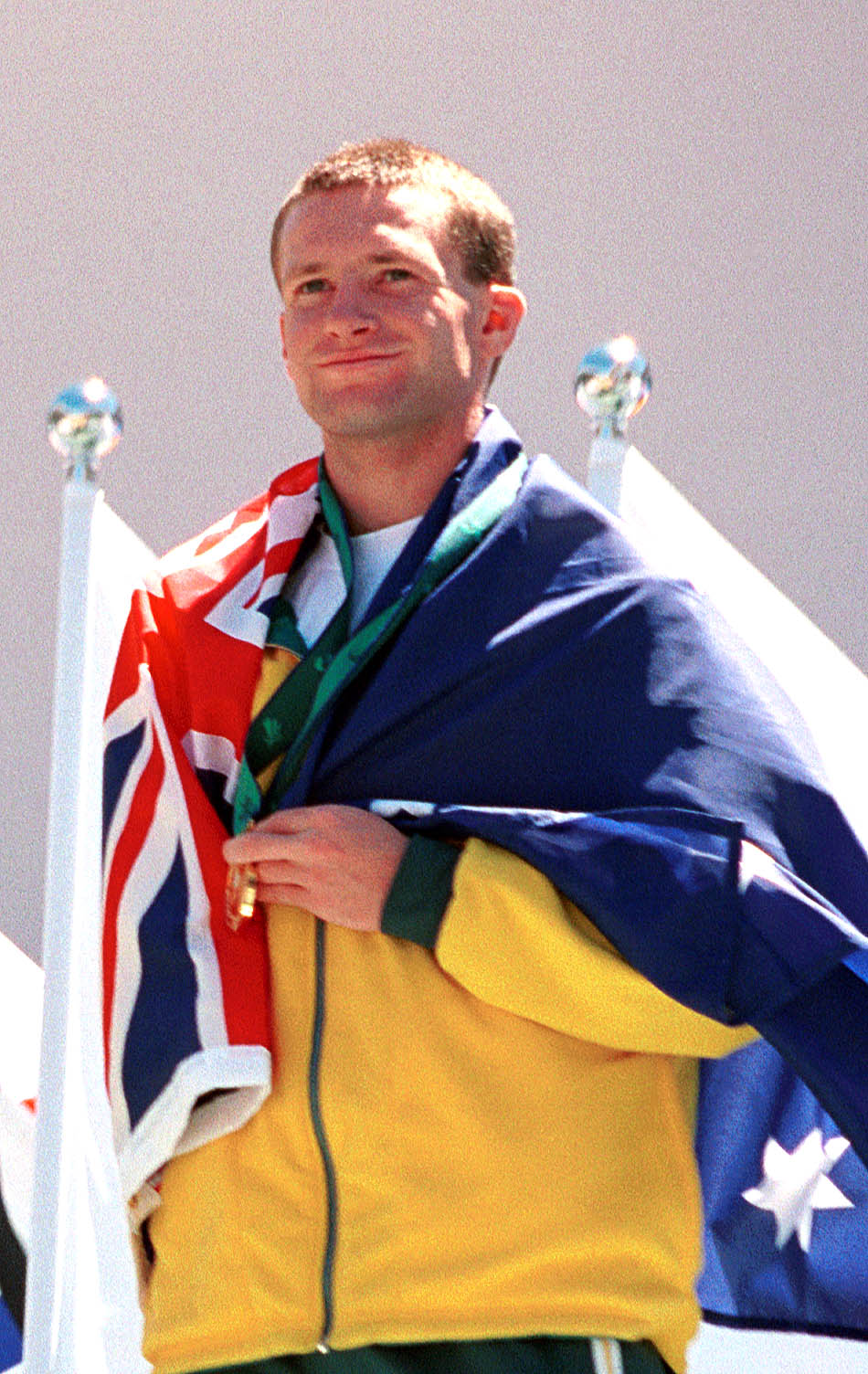
Francis shown wrapped in the Australian flag and holding his gold medal won in the Men's 4 x 100 m T46 relay at the 2000 Summer Paralympic Games

Heath Wesley Francis, OAM (born 16 November 1981 in Newcastle, New South Wales is an Australian athlete who has participated in the 2000, 2004 and 2008 Summer Paralympics. His right arm was amputated at the age of seven as a result of a mincing accident on his family farm in Booral, New South Wales.

== Professional Competitive career ==
At the 2008 Beijing Paralympics he became the first arm amputee athlete to win the sprint treble (100m, 200m and 400m events) at a Paralympics, a feat he accomplished 2 years earlier at the 2006 IPC World Championships. He competes in the T46 classification for arm amputees, where he is the current 200m (21.74s) & 400m (47.63s) World Record holder. Both World Record times were run at the 2008 Beijing Paralympics. In 2000, his competitive sport participation was sponsored by the New South Wales WorkCover.

He received a Medal of The Order of Australia for his 2000 gold medals. He also received an Australian Sports Medal in 2000 and a Centenary Medal in 2001. He was an Australian Institute of Sport scholarship holder from 2003 to 2010 and was coached by Irina Dvoskina. In 2014, he was inducted into the Sydney Olympic Park Athletic Centre Path of Champions.

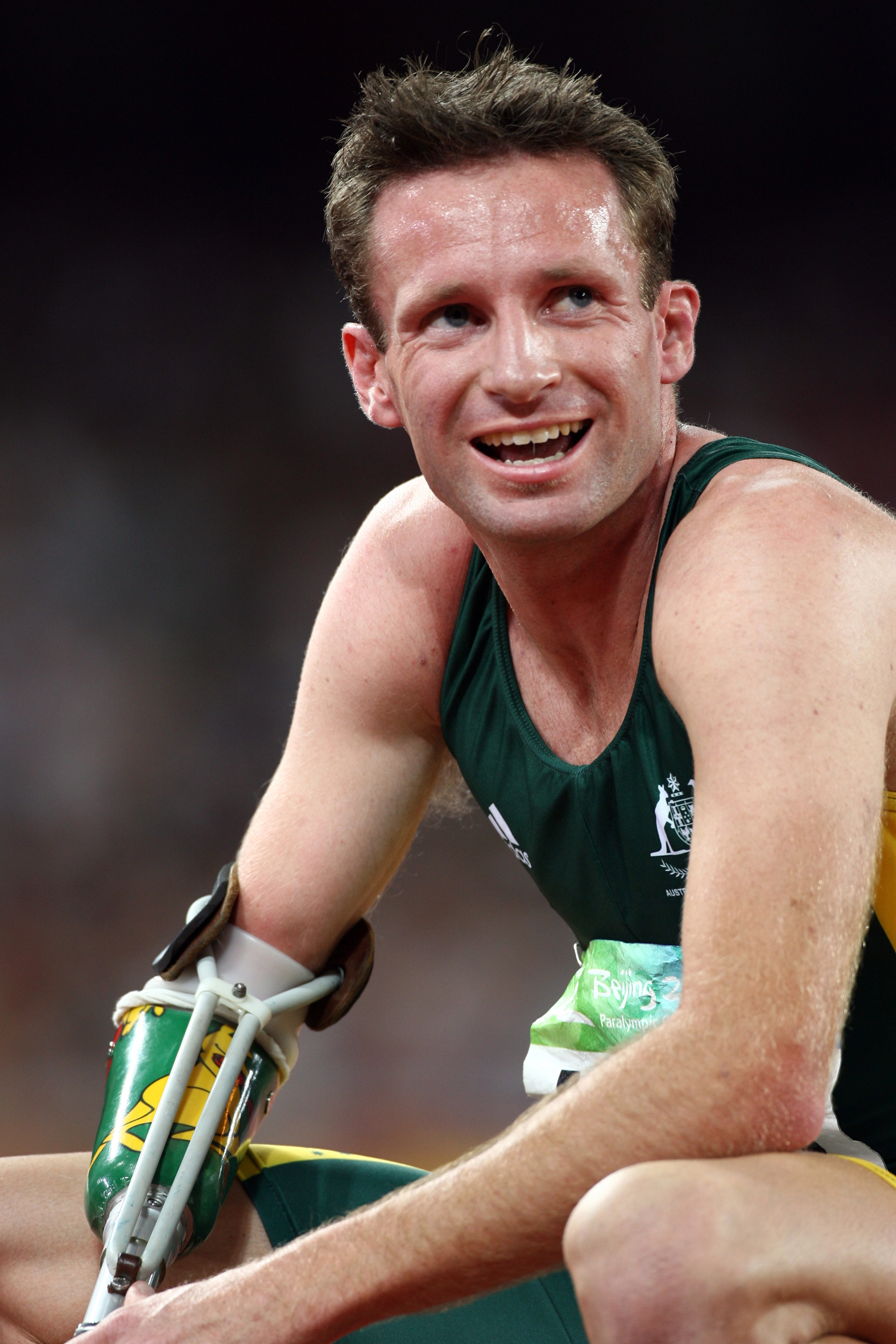
Francis at the end of the 400m at the 2008 Beijing Games

== Personal life ==
Heath Francis completed his Bachelor of Commerce and Bachelor of Business Degrees from the University of Newcastle (2000–2007) whilst training at the Australian Institute of Sport.

Francis turned his focus to advancing his professional career and used his profile as a Paralympic athlete to increase awareness of . He currently works for Westpac Bank. He also had joined charity organization like CARE Australia and The Australian Himalayan Foundation.

As an ambassador for Good Return, Francis join Charity event like Sun run, had raised more than $17,000 for funding training and consumer protection work to give people living in poverty the chance to grow their incomes safely and effectively.

Awards and achievements
Preceded by Nathan Deakes and Anna Meares	Australian Athlete of the Year; 2008 (with Ken Wallace)	Succeeded by Emma Moffatt and Brenton Rickard
