= Neil Fuller =

Australian Paralympic athlete

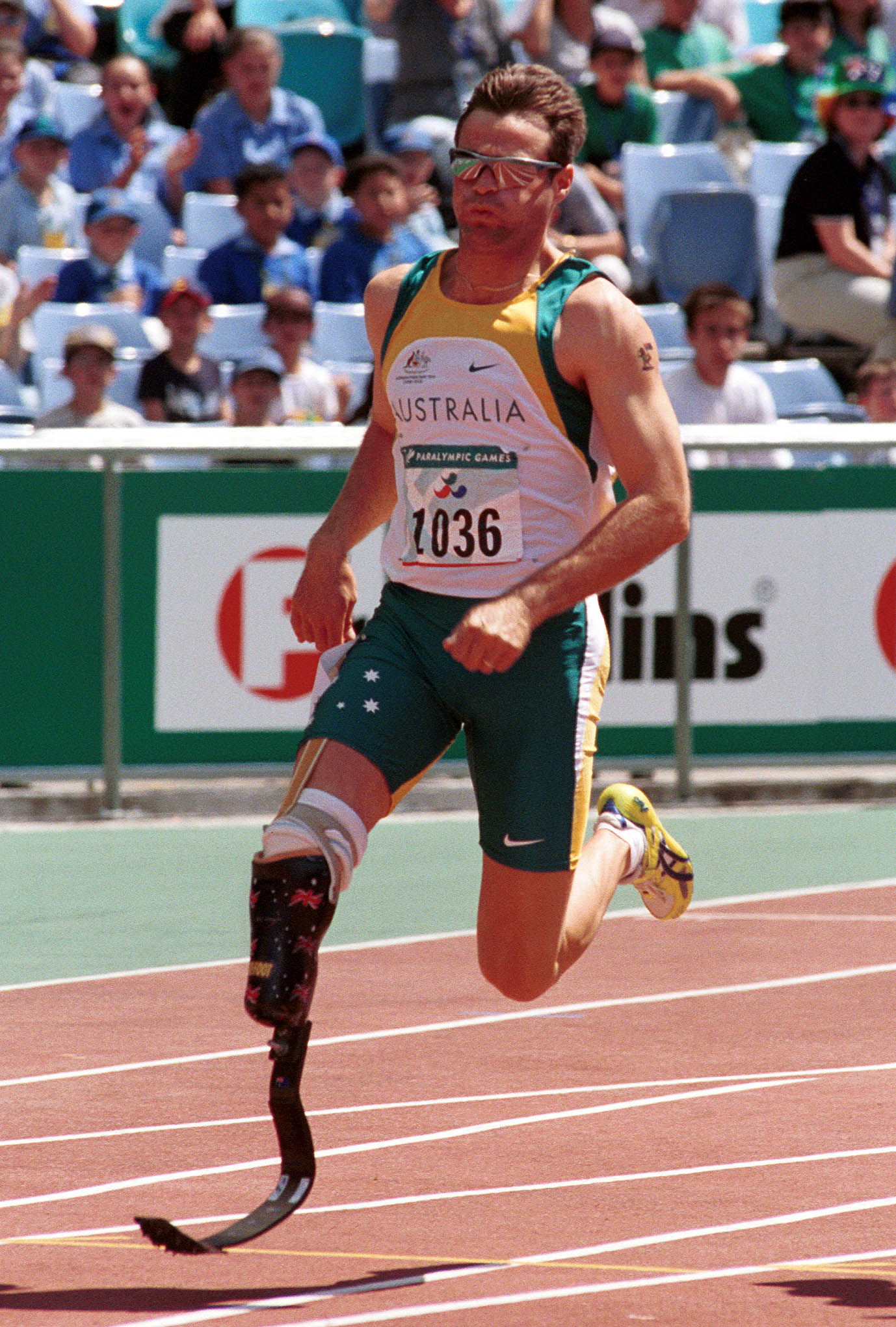
- Action shot of Fuller sprinting at the 2000 Summer Paralympics

Personal information
- Full name: Neil Robert Fuller
- Nationality: Australian
- Born: 2 August 1969 (age 57) Shoreham by Sea, Sussex, England
Medal record
Men's para athletics
Representing Australia
Paralympic Games
Gold medal – first place	1992 Barcelona	4 x 100 m TS2,4
Gold medal – first place	1996 Atlanta	4 x 100 m T42-46
Gold medal – first place	2000 Sydney	200 m T44
Gold medal – first place	2000 Sydney	400 m T44
Gold medal – first place	2000 Sydney	4 x 100 m T46
Gold medal – first place	2000 Sydney	4 x 400 m T46
Silver medal – second place	1992 Barcelona	200 m TS2
Silver medal – second place	1992 Barcelona	400 m TS2
Silver medal – second place	1996 Atlanta	100 m T43-44
Silver medal – second place	1996 Atlanta	200 m T43-44
Silver medal – second place	2004 Athens	400 m T44
Silver medal – second place	2004 Athens	4 x 400 m T42-46
Bronze medal – third place	1992 Barcelona	100 m TS2
Bronze medal – third place	2000 Sydney	100 m T46
Bronze medal – third place	2004 Athens	4 x 100 m T42-46
World Championships
Gold medal – first place	1994 Berlin	100 m T44
Gold medal – first place	1994 Berlin	200 m T44
Gold medal – first place	1994 Berlin	400 m T44
Gold medal – first place	1994 Berlin	4 x 100 m T42-46
Gold medal – first place	1998 Birmingham	100 m T44
Gold medal – first place	1998 Birmingham	200 m T44
Gold medal – first place	1998 Birmingham	400 m T44
Gold medal – first place	1998 Birmingham	4 x 400 m T42-46
Silver medal – second place	2002 Lille	200 m T44
Silver medal – second place	2002 Lille	400 m T44
Bronze medal – third place	1994 Berlin	Long Jump F44
World Championships and Games for the Disabled
Bronze medal – third place	1990 Assen	Long Jump 7F

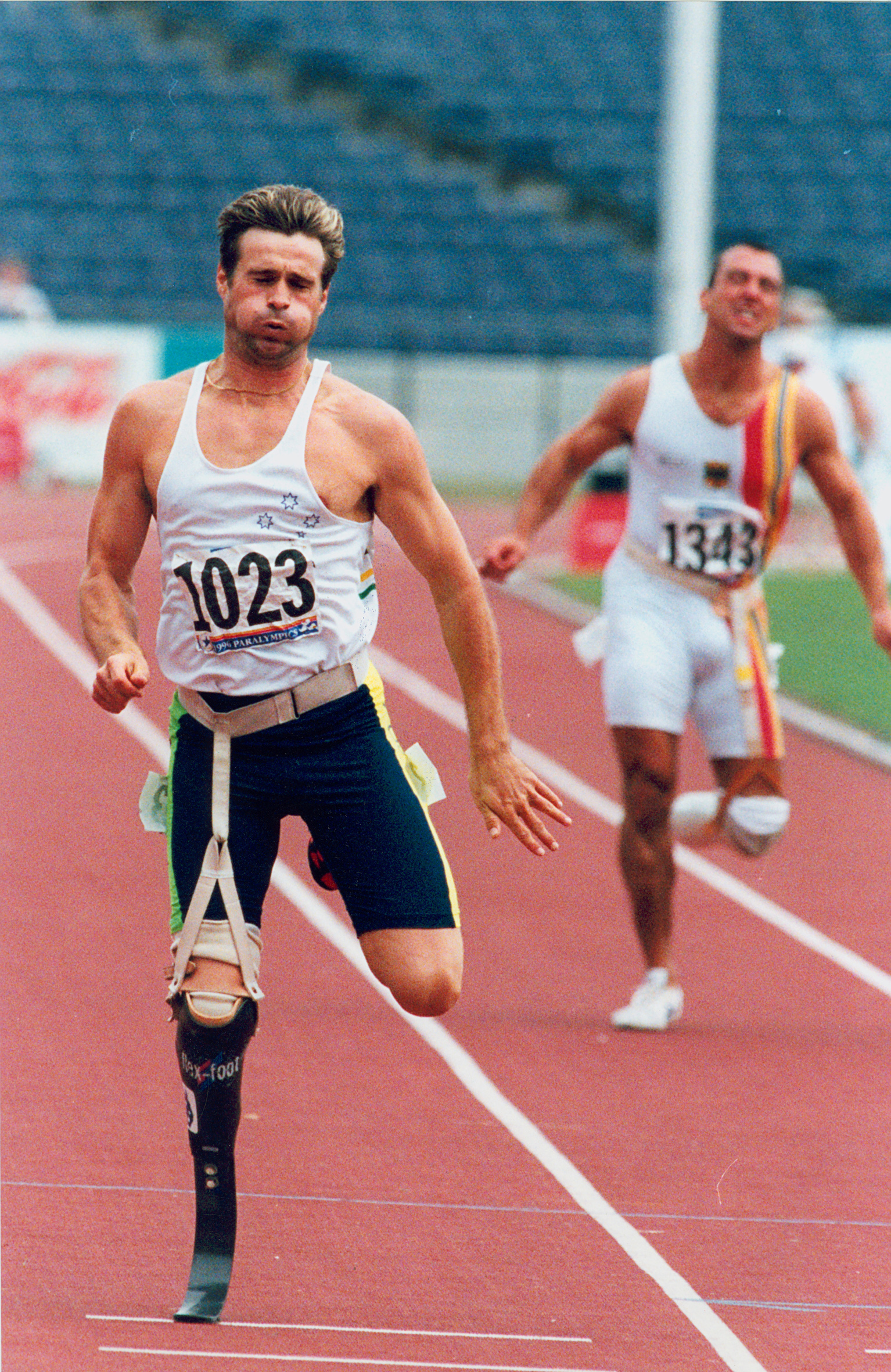

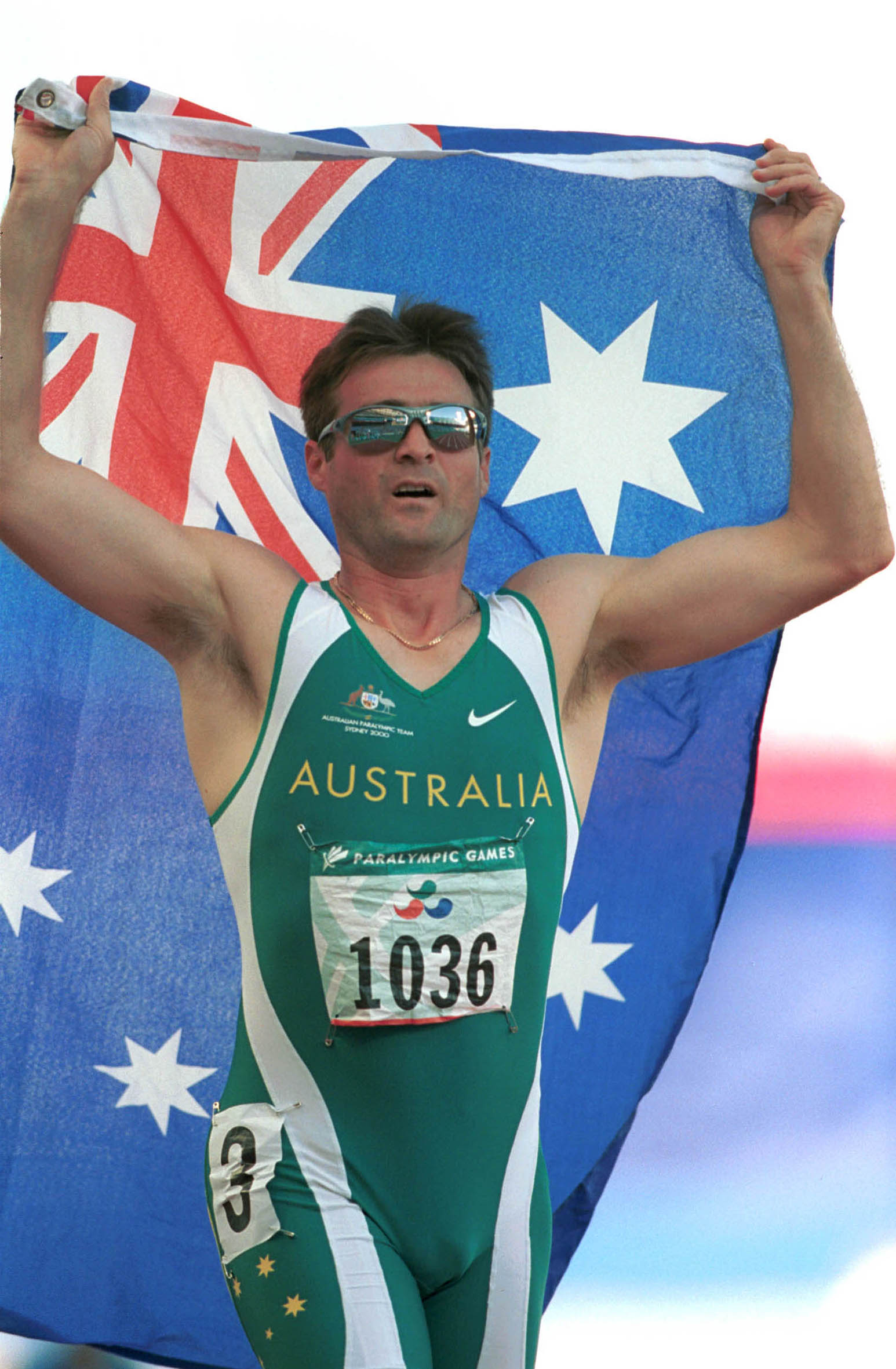
Fuller carrying the Australian flag at the 2000 Summer Paralympics

Neil Robert Fuller, OAM (born 2 August 1969 in Shoreham by Sea, Sussex) is an Australian athlete, Paralympic competitor, and amputee.

During his youth, Neil was an ambitious soccer player, gaining a position playing at state level for South Australia. It was during a soccer match on 25 July 1987 that his tibia and fibula were broken, and a major artery in his right leg was severed in an attempted tackle to the shin. Legally becoming an adult during his 22 days in hospital, he opted to have the lower part of his right leg amputated after gangrene had set in.

In February 1989, Fuller entered the Amputee Nationals in Adelaide in the 100m race, long jump and high jump. Fuller was then selected as a member of the Australian team to compete at the Far East and South Pacific International Championships where he competed in the 100m, long jump, high jump and the pentathlon.

After the accident, Fuller made a comeback into the world of sports becoming a world class runner and world record holder.

He is now coordinator of Sport at St Peters Collegiate Girls School in Adelaide, South Australia

== Athletic Achievement ==
In 1990, Fuller competed in the World Championships and Games for the Disabled in Assen, Netherlands winning a bronze medal in the men's long jump 7F. Fuller also participated in the 1998 World Championships in Birmingham, UK where he won four gold medals. He participated in four consecutive Summer Paralympic Games, from 1992 to 2004. In 1992 he won a gold medal, for which he received a Medal of the Order of Australia, two silver medals, and one bronze medal. At the 1996 Summer Paralympics, he won silver in the 100 and 200 metre races and gold in the 4×100 metre relay. Four years later, at the Sydney Paralympics, he won four gold medals in the 200 metres, 400 metres, 4×100 metre relay, and 4×400 metre relay, and a bronze in the 100 metres. At the 2004 Paralympics in Athens, he won two silver medals in the 400 metres and the 4×400 metre relay, and a bronze in the 4×100 metre relay.

== Awards ==
He was inducted into the Athletics South Australia Hall of Fame in 1997.

In 2012, Neil was inducted into the South Australia Sport Hall of Fame.

In 2000, Fuller received an Australian Sports Medal for "service to amputee athletics as World Class Competitor and Development of National Training Squad".

In 2001, he was inducted into the Australian Institute of Sport 'Best of the Best'
