= 2025 World Para Athletics Championships – Men's discus throw =

The men's discus throw events at the 2025 World Para Athletics Championships were held at the Jawaharlal Nehru Stadium, Delhi in New Delhi.

== Medalists ==
Event	Gold	Silver	Bronze
F11	Hassan Bajoulvand; Iran	Alessandro Rodrigo Silva; Brazil	Álvaro del Amo Cano; Spain
F37	Luis Carlos López Valenzuela; Mexico	Yamato Shimbo; Japan	Mykola Zhabnyak; Ukraine
F44	Andrés Mosquera; Colombia	Akeem Stewart; Trinidad and Tobago	Dan Greaves; Great Britain
F52	Aigars Apinis; Latvia	André Rocha; Brazil	Velimir Šandor; Croatia
F56	Claudiney Batista; Brazil	Yogesh Kathuniya; India	Konstantinos Tzounis; Greece
F57	Mahmoud Rajab; Libya	Thiago Paulino dos Santos; Brazil	Atul Kaushik; India
F64	Ivan Katanušić; Croatia	Max Rohn; United States	Pardeep Kumar; India

== F11 ==
Final

The event took place on 3 October.

Rank	Name	Nationality	Class	#1	#2	#3	#4	#5	#6	Result	Notes
1st place, gold medalist(s)	Hassan Bajoulvand	Iran	F11	40.30	40.77	39.72	39.08	41.70	x	41.70	SB
2nd place, silver medalist(s)	Alessandro Rodrigo Silva	Brazil	F11	39.29	37.05	37.58	40.14	x	x	40.14	
3rd place, bronze medalist(s)	Álvaro del Amo Cano	Spain	F11	38.44	39.26	39.28	38.23	37.32	35.32	39.28	SB
4	Oney Tapia	Italy	F11	x	x	38.06	x	x	x	38.06	
5	Petteri Peitso	Finland	F11	36.17	34.44	x	x	28.96	37.62	37.62	
6	Bil Marinkovic	Austria	F11	35.45	36.52	35.44	34.81	x	34.81	36.52	
7	Mahdi Olad	Iran	F11	35.96	x	x	x	x	x	35.96	
8	Igor Baskakov	Neutral Paralympic Athletes	F11	30.26	30.63	32.91	29.92	32.80	32.80	32.91	SB
9	Monu Ghangas	India	F11	31.50	x	32.65				32.65	
	Leonildo Carvalho	Portugal	F11	DNS							

== F37 ==
Final

The event took place on 2 October.

Rank	Name	Nationality	Class	#1	#2	#3	#4	#5	#6	Result	Notes
1st place, gold medalist(s)	Luis Carlos López Valenzuela	Mexico	F37	50.97	56.59	x	48.44	53.19	54.82	56.59	CR
2nd place, silver medalist(s)	Yamato Shimbo	Japan	F37	48.78	49.66	x	49.89	50.71	54.50	54.50	PB
3rd place, bronze medalist(s)	Mykola Zhabnyak	Ukraine	F37	46.45	50.49	52.02	52.79	50.68	45.36	52.79	SB
4	Haney	India	F37	51.22	x	x	49.21	47.30	46.34	51.22	
5	Tolibboy Yuldashev	Uzbekistan	F37	39.84	45.37	45.80	45.27	47.27	50.81	50.81	SB
6	Jesse Zesseu	Canada	F37	48.91	x	x	46.97	x	x	48.91	
7	Łukasz Czarnecki	Poland	F37	x	46.67	47.93	45.58	43.83	45.65	47.93	PB
8	Mohamed Mohamed Ramadan	Egypt	F37	x	47.22	47.61	x	46.13	46.51	47.61	SB
9	Kudratillokhon Marufkhujaev	Uzbekistan	F37	x	41.61	44.84				44.84	
10	Jakub Miroslaw	Poland	F37	x	x	44.56				44.56	
11	Donatas Dundzys	Lithuania	F37	40.54	x	43.92				43.92	
12	Bryan Leonel Enriquez	Mexico	F37	41.47	33.88	39.33				41.47	
13	Michal Vimmer	Czech Republic	F37	40.16	40.26	x				40.26	SB
	Aleksandr Belobokov	Neutral Paralympic Athletes	F37	DNS							

== F44 ==
Final

The event took place on 3 October.

Rank	Name	Nationality	Class	#1	#2	#3	#4	#5	#6	Result	Notes
1st place, gold medalist(s)	Andrés Mosquera	Colombia	F44	59.87	60.26	59.50	60.24	59.03	x	60.26	PB
2nd place, silver medalist(s)	Akeem Stewart	Trinidad and Tobago	F43	59.12	x	59.19	55.97	59.64	55.96	59.64	SB
3rd place, bronze medalist(s)	Dan Greaves	Great Britain	F44	x	52.21	x	x	52.42	x	52.42	
4	Sagar Thayat	India	F43	50.15	51.93	x	49.67	x	50.29	51.93	PB
5	Harrison Walsh	Great Britain	F44	51.49	x	x	51.24	51.25	51.49	51.49	
6	Devender Kumar	India	F44	44.13	45.12	50.12	46.69	x	49.69	50.12	
7	Egert Jõesaar	Estonia	F44	46.48	46.76	46.87	47.15	x	47.64	47.64	
8	Pardeep	India	F44	46.14	x	x	45.31	x	x	46.14	
9	Jonas Spudis	Lithuania	F44	40.40	x	x				40.40	

== F52 ==
Final

The event took place on 28 September.

Rank	Name	Nationality	Class	#1	#2	#3	#4	#5	#6	Result	Notes
1st place, gold medalist(s)	Aigars Apinis	Latvia	F52	18.99	19.13	19.12	19.31	19.32	19.15	19.32	SB
2nd place, silver medalist(s)	André Rocha	Brazil	F52	15.62	18.55	18.79	x	x	x	18.79	
3rd place, bronze medalist(s)	Velimir Šandor	Croatia	F52	17.47	18.09	17.26	17.48	17.63	16.78	18.09	
4	Zoltan Bessenyey	Hungary	F52	16.60	16.96	17.11	15.78	17.37	17.54	17.54	PB
5	Kęstutis Skučas	Lithuania	F52	13.82	14.73	15.21	x	x	14.94	15.21	
6	Uladzislau Hryb	Neutral Paralympic Athletes	F51	12.44	13.09	12.59	12.32	10.73	12.24	13.09	PB
7	Raimondas Dabuzinskas	Lithuania	F52	11.26	12.23	12.26	12.34	12.38	12.35	12.38	
8	Grigorios Ntislis	Greece	F52	x	11.44	x	11.46	11.49	x	11.49	

== F56 ==
Final

The event took place on 30 September.

Rank	Name	Nationality	Class	#1	#2	#3	#4	#5	#6	Result	Notes
1st place, gold medalist(s)	Claudiney Batista	Brazil	F56	44.92	45.39	45.67	45.61	44.60	45.66	45.67	
2nd place, silver medalist(s)	Yogesh Kathuniya	India	F56	41.40	42.49	41.02	42.10	41.08	41.83	42.49	
3rd place, bronze medalist(s)	Konstantinos Tzounis	Greece	F56	37.16	37.29	39.11	38.84	39.08	39.97	39.97	
4	Cristofer Murillo	Panama	F55	34.74	37.29	36.95	36.89	35.80	36.16	37.29	PB
5	Mateusz Biernat	Poland	F56	34.99	34.38	36.28	x	33.95	36.52	36.52	
6	Kenny Pacheco	Peru	F55	34.85	34.95	31.12	35.19	33.84	33.20	35.19	
7	Riadi Saputra	Indonesia	F56	x	32.62	x	x	31.89	x	32.62	SB
8	Lazaros Stefanidis	Greece	F55	11.63	12.16	13.50	12.62	13.89	14.11	14.11	SB

== F57 ==
Final

The event took place on 2 October.

Rank	Name	Nationality	Class	#1	#2	#3	#4	#5	#6	Result	Notes
1st place, gold medalist(s)	Mahmoud Rajab	Libya	F57	42.73	46.35	46.73	44.53	44.36	46.16	46.73	CR
2nd place, silver medalist(s)	Thiago Paulino dos Santos	Brazil	F57	43.11	44.92	41.17	44.43	45.69	45.12	45.69	
3rd place, bronze medalist(s)	Atul Kaushik	India	F57	x	42.47	43.55	42.24	45.61	44.12	45.61	
4	Yorkinbek Odilov	Uzbekistan	F57	44.49	43.90	42.07	45.05	43.00	x	45.05	SB
5	I Kadek Dwi Yasa	Indonesia	F57	38.96	42.67	38.58	36.74	44.60	44.02	44.60	
6	Teijo Kööpikkä	Finland	F57	41.22	42.19	43.83	41.47	42.70	42.56	43.83	
7	Hussein Khazaee	Iraq	F57	40.65	41.43	42.76	43.03	41.96	x	43.03	SB
8	Priyans Kumar	India	F57	41.35	42.52	41.87	40.64	x	42.40	42.52	PB
9	Ilkhomjon Turgunov	Uzbekistan	F57	36.75	39.49	x	39.42	37.13	36.83	39.49	
10	Jaroslav Petrous	Czech Republic	F57	35.41	38.58	36.30	37.74	39.15	39.29	39.29	

Qualification

The event took place on 1 October. Qualification: The 4 best performers (q) advance to the Final

Rank	Name	Nationality	Class	#1	#2	#3	Result	Notes
1	Yorkinbek Odilov	Uzbekistan	F57	40.36	42.98	44.44	44.44	q, SB
2	Ilkhomjon Turgunov	Uzbekistan	F57	38.91	40.43	38.29	40.43	q
3	Jaroslav Petrous	Czech Republic	F57	38.59	38.70	39.86	39.86	q
4	Priyans Kumar	India	F57	38.85	37.66	39.12	39.12	q
5	Birbhadra Singh	India	F57	38.79	38.28	37.12	38.79	
6	Haidr Salamh	Saudi Arabia	F57	32.21	x	35.98	35.98	
7	Miroslav Petković	Croatia	F57	35.37	35.40	x	35.40	
8	David Fernández Fernández	Spain	F57	31.01	33.74	34.88	34.88	
9	Sargis Mkhitaryan	Armenia	F57	30.18	31.20	26.65	31.20	PB
10	Ionut Preda	Romania	F57	29.58	29.05	29.05	29.58	
11	Raigo Roots	Estonia	F57	28.91	x	x	28.91	
	Cedric Idriss Lekezo Azamdzi	Cameroon	F57	DNS				

== F64 ==
Final

The event took place on 3 October.

Rank	Name	Nationality	Class	#1	#2	#3	#4	#5	#6	Result	Notes
1st place, gold medalist(s)	Ivan Katanušić	Croatia	F64	54.01	51.94	52.45	53.34	55.12	x	55.12	SB
2nd place, silver medalist(s)	Max Rohn	United States	F64	48.77	49.73	50.92	50.64	50.25	44.14	50.92	SB
3rd place, bronze medalist(s)	Pardeep Kumar	India	F64	44.15	44.38	44.49	46.23	45.54	46.05	46.23	SB
4	Na Ersi	China	F64	40.23	43.56	45.52	44.30	43.33	42.85	45.52	SB
5	Sharvan Kumar	India	F64	43.41	x	42.71	42.78	x	44.11	44.11	SB
6	Tomás Soto	Colombia	F64	x	36.05	33.02	x	32.58	x	36.05	SB
7	Leonel Velasquez	Guatemala	F64	26.60	32.40	x	26.64	x	27.01	32.40	SB
