= Pakistan at the Paralympics =

- IPC code: PAK
- NPC: National Paralympic Committee of Pakistan
- Medals Ranked 105th: Gold 1 Silver 1 Bronze 2 Total 4

Summer appearances
- 1992; 1996; 2000; 2004; 2008; 2012; 2016; 2020; 2024

The National Olympic Committee of Pakistan was created in 1948. Pakistan first participated at the Paralympic Games in 1992, and has sent athletes to compete in every Summer Paralympic Games since then. Pakistan has won four medals, one gold, one silver, and two bronze medals in the Paralympic Games. All four medals have come courtesy of Haider Ali in the Men's Long Jump and Discus Throw events. Pakistan has never participated in the Winter Paralympic Games.

== History ==
Pakistan won its first Paralympics medal at the 2008 Summer Paralympics when Haider Ali clinched a silver medal in the F-37/38 Category of the men's long jump, his last jump of 6.44 meters was a joint world record with the Tunisian athlete Farhat Chida, however, Farhat had six valid jumps, while Haider had four, so he had to settle for the silver medal. He also came 4th in the Men's discus throw F37–38 event.

At the 2016 Summer Paralympics Haider Ali won a bronze medal in the Men's Long Jump - T37 event. He was also the flag bearer for Pakistan during the opening ceremony of the Rio Paralympics. But his best moment came during the 2020 Summer Paralympics when he won a gold medal in the Men's Discus Throw - F37 event. Haider Ali added another bronze medal to his collection with his season-best throw in the Men's discus throw F37 at the 2024 Summer Paralympics.

== Medal tables ==
=== Medals by Games ===
Games	Athletes	Athletes by sport				Medals			Total	Rank
Games	Athletes	Athletics	Cycling	Powerlifting	Swimming	Gold medal	Silver medal	Bronze medal	Total	Rank
1960–1988	did not participate									
(Spain) 1992 Barcelona	2	1	-	-	1	-	-	-	-	–
(United States) 1996 Atlanta	1	-	1	-	-	-	-	-	-	–
(Australia) 2000 Sydney	1	1	-	-	-	-	-	-	-	–
(Greece) 2004 Athens	9	9	-	-	-	-	-	-	-	–
(China) 2008 Beijing	3	2	-	1	-	-	1	-	1	63
(United Kingdom) 2012 London	2	2	-	-	-	-	-	-	-	–
(Brazil) 2016 Rio	1	1	-	-	-	-	-	1	1	76
(Japan) 2020 Tokyo	2	2	-	-	-	1	-	-	1	59
(France) 2024 Paris	1	1	-	-	-	-	-	1	1	79
(United States) 2028 Los Angeles	Future Event									
(Australia) 2032 Brisbane	Future Event									
Total						1	1	2	4	105

=== Medals by sports ===
Medals by sport
Sport	(gold) Gold	(silver) Silver	(bronze) Bronze	Total	Rank
Athletics	1	1	2	4	TBD
Total	1	1	2	4	105

== List of Medalists ==
Medal	Name	Games	Sport	Event
(silver) Silver	Haider Ali	2008 Beijing	Athletics	Men's Long Jump - F37/38
(bronze) Bronze	Haider Ali	2016 Rio	Athletics	Men's Long Jump - T37
(gold) Gold	Haider Ali	2020 Tokyo	Athletics	Men's Discus Throw - F37
(bronze) Bronze	Haider Ali	2024 Paris	Athletics	Men's Discus Throw - F37

== Milestones ==
=== Firsts ===
- First Medal: 2008 Beijing, (silver) , Haider Ali, Men's Long Jump - F37/38
- First Gold Medal: 2020 Tokyo, (gold) , Haider Ali, Men's Discus Throw - F37
- First Individual Multi-medallist: Haider Ali, (silver) , (bronze) (2), (gold) , 2008 Beijing, 2016 Rio, 2020 Tokyo and 2024 Paris

=== Multiple Medalists ===
Athlete	Sport	Games	(gold) Gold	(silver) Silver	(bronze) Bronze	Total
Haider Ali	Athletics	2008–2024	1	1	2	4

== See also ==
- Pakistan at the Olympics
- Pakistan at the Commonwealth Games
- Pakistan at the Asian Games
