= 2021 World Para Athletics European Championships – Men's discus throw =

The men's discus throw events were held at the 2021 World Para Athletics European Championships in Bydgoszcz, Poland.

== Medalists ==
Event	Gold		Silver		Bronze	
F11	Mirosław Madzia (POL)	37.16	Pavel Nesterenko (RUS)	36.10 SB	Alvaro del Amo Cano (ESP)	36.08
F37	Mykola Zhabnyak (UKR)	54.22	Donatas Dundzys (LTU)	41.67	Ronni Jensen (DEN)	39.19
F52	Piotr Kosewicz (POL)	20.86 CR	Robert Jachimowicz (POL)	20.18	Velimir Šandor (CRO)	19.78
F56	Konstantinos Tzounis (GRE)	42.71 ER	Dušan Laczkó (SVK)	39.82 PB	Nebojša Đurić (SRB)	37.71 SB
F64	Ivan Katanušić (CRO)	57.94 CR	Dan Greaves (GBR)	57.05	Harrison Walsh (GBR)	54.85 PB
WR world record | ER European record | CR championship record | NR national record | WL world leading | EL European leading | PB personal best | SB seasonal best

== See also ==
- List of IPC world records in athletics
