= Pakistan at the 1992 Summer Paralympics =

- IPC code: PAK
- NPC: National Paralympic Committee of Pakistan

in Barcelona
- Medals: Gold 0 Silver 0 Bronze 0 Total 0

Summer Paralympics appearances (overview)
- 1992; 1996; 2000; 2004; 2008; 2012; 2016; 2020; 2024

Pakistan sent a delegation to compete at the 1992 Summer Paralympics in Barcelona, Spain. It was the country's first ever participation at any of these Games. It sent two athletes, Khawar Malik, a swimmer and Khalid Mahmood a discus thrower.
