= Atul Kaushik =

Indian Paralympic athlete (born 1996)

Personal information
- Born: 22 April 1996 (age 30) Kair, Delhi, India

Sport
- Sport: Para-athletics
- Disability class: F57
- Event: Discus throw
Medal record
Men's para-athletics
Representing India
World Championships
Bronze medal – third place	2025 New Delhi	Discus throw F57

Atul Kaushik (born 22 April 1996) is an Indian para discus thrower who competes in F57 category.

== Early life ==
Born to a farmer in Kair, Delhi, Kaushik was born with polio on his left leg. He took up para sports when he was five years old. Kaushik hadn't realized about this until 2016, when he watch an episode of Comedy Nights with Kapil that featured Deepa Malik and Mariyappan Thangavelu, both in whom medalled at the 2016 Summer Paralympics. As a result, he decided to take up an interest in para athletics.

== Career ==
At the 2023 Khelo India Para Games, Kaushik won the gold medal in the shot put.

In March 2025, Kaushik competed in the World Para Athletics Grand Prix 2025 New Delhi, where he won the gold medal in the discus throw. Several months later, he represented India at the 2025 World Para Athletics Championships and won the bronze medal in the discus throw event, becoming the second Indian to win a world medal in this event.
