= Pakistan at the 2004 Summer Paralympics =

- IPC code: PAK
- NPC: National Paralympic Committee of Pakistan

in Athens
- Competitors: 9
- Medals: Gold 0 Silver 0 Bronze 0 Total 0

Summer Paralympics appearances (overview)
- 1992; 1996; 2000; 2004; 2008; 2012; 2016; 2020; 2024

Pakistan competed at the 2004 Summer Paralympics in Athens, Greece. The team included 9 athletes, 8 men and 1 woman, but won no medals.

== Sports ==
=== Athletics ===
==== Men's track ====
Athlete	Class	Event	Heats		Semifinal		Final	
Athlete	Class	Event	Result	Rank	Result	Rank	Result	Rank
Noor Alam	T44	100m	17.08	13	did not advance			
Muhammad Ashfaq	T42	100m	—				17.91	8
Munawar Hussain	T46	100m	12.26	11	did not advance			
Munawar Hussain	T46	200m	25.85	14	did not advance			
Nasrullah Khan	T37	100m	13.26	9	did not advance			
Nasrullah Khan	T37	200m	27.94	11	did not advance			
Zubair Khan	T37	100m	14.64	10	did not advance			
Zubair Khan	T37	200m	31.58	12	did not advance			
Shafique Muhammad	T46	100m	12.54	12	did not advance			
Shafique Muhammad	T46	200m	26.11	16	did not advance			
Shafique Muhammad	T46	400m	59.53	9	did not advance			
Shahzad Muhammad	T13	100m	12.77	14	did not advance			
Shahzad Muhammad	T13	200m	27.32	12	did not advance			

==== Men's field ====
Athlete	Class	Event	Final		
Athlete	Class	Event	Result	Points	Rank
Muhammad Adeel	F44	Long jump	4.19	-	8
Muhammad Adeel	F44/46	Javelin	38.16	709	9
Muhammad Adeel	F44/46	Shot put	7.58	521	15
Noor Alam	F44	Long jump	3.89	-	9
Noor Alam	F44/46	Javelin	DNS		
Noor Alam	F44/46	Shot put	6.14	422	17
Muhammad Ashfaq	F42	Javelin	29.26	-	12
Muhammad Ashfaq	F42	Long jump	3.62	-	7
Munawar Hussain	F44/46	Javelin	34.93	627	12
Nasrullah Khan	F36-38	Long jump	4.88	843	10
Nasrullah Khan	F37	Shot put	7.31	-	7
Zubair Khan	F36-38	Long jump	3.98	687	11
Zubair Khan	F37	Shot put	7.05	-	8
Shafique Muhammad	F44/46	Shot put	6.74	430	16
Shahzad Muhammad	F13	Long jump	4.35	-	9

==== Women's track ====
Athlete	Class	Event	Heats		Semifinal		Final	
Athlete	Class	Event	Result	Rank	Result	Rank	Result	Rank
Amina Bibi	T11	100m	24.23	12	did not advance			
Amina Bibi	T11	200m	DNS		did not advance			

== See also ==
- Pakistan at the Paralympics
- Pakistan at the 2004 Summer Olympics
