= Pakistan at the 1996 Summer Paralympics =

- IPC code: PAK
- NPC: National Paralympic Committee of Pakistan

in Atlanta
- Medals: Gold 0 Silver 0 Bronze 0 Total 0

Summer Paralympics appearances (overview)
- 1992; 1996; 2000; 2004; 2008; 2012; 2016; 2020; 2024

Pakistan sent a delegation to compete at the 1996 Summer Paralympics in Atlanta, United States. Its lone representative was cyclist, Bahadur Khel.
