= Pakistan at the 2008 Summer Paralympics =

- IPC code: PAK
- NPC: National Paralympic Committee of Pakistan

in Beijing
- Competitors: 3 in 2 sports
- Medals Ranked 63rd: Gold 0 Silver 1 Bronze 0 Total 1

Summer Paralympics appearances (overview)
- 1992; 1996; 2000; 2004; 2008; 2012; 2016; 2020; 2024

Pakistan sent a delegation to compete at the 2008 Summer Paralympics in Beijing, China. Haider Ali created history by winning a silver medal, the country's first at any Paralympics. The delegation was also rocked by a doping scandal, when its powerlifter, Naveed Ahmed Butt was banned for testing positive, the first athlete at the games.

== Medallists ==
The country won one medal, a silver.

Medal	Name	Sport	Event
Silver	Haider Ali	Athletics	Men's Long Jump F37/38

== Sports ==
=== Athletics ===
==== Men's track ====
Athlete	Class	Event	Heats		Final	
Athlete	Class	Event	Result	Rank	Result	Rank
Haider Ali	T38	100m	—		11.98	9
Haider Ali	T38	200m	24.84	9	did not advance	

==== Men's field ====
Athlete	Class	Event	Final		
Athlete	Class	Event	Result	Points	Rank
Haider Ali	F37-38	Long jump	6.44 =WR	1104	2nd place, silver medalist(s)
Haider Ali	F37-38	Discus throw	43.95	986	4

==== Women's field ====
Athlete	Class	Event	Final		
Athlete	Class	Event	Result	Points	Rank
Nadia Hafeez	F13	Long jump	3.33	-	14

=== Powerlifting ===
Athlete	Event	Result	Rank
Nasir Butt	60kg	125.0	12

== See also ==
- Pakistan at the Paralympics
- Pakistan at the 2008 Summer Olympics
