= Pakistan at the 2020 Summer Paralympics =

- IPC code: PAK
- NPC: National Paralympic Committee of Pakistan

in Tokyo
- Competitors: 2 in 1 sports
- Medals: Gold 1 Silver 0 Bronze 0 Total 1

Summer Paralympics appearances (overview)
- 1992; 1996; 2000; 2004; 2008; 2012; 2016; 2020; 2024

Pakistan competed at the 2020 Summer Paralympics in Tokyo, Japan, from 24 August to 5 September 2021. It sent two athletes, one of either gender to compete in athletics (discus throw).

== Medalists ==
Medal	Name	Sport	Event	Date
Gold	Haider Ali	Athletics	Men's discus throw F37	3 September

== Athletics ==
Two Pakistani athletes qualified for the athletics competitions that took place between 27 August and 5 September 2021.

Athlete	Event	Final	
Athlete	Event	Result	Rank
Haider Ali	Discus throw F37	55.26	1st place, gold medalist(s)
Anila Izzat Baig	Discus throw F64	19.08	10
