= Ronak =

Ronak is a given name and surname. Notable people with the name include:

== Given name ==
- Ronak Lakhani, Pakistani philanthropist
- Ronak Pandit (born 1985), Indian sport shooter
- Ronak Patani (born 1993), British actor and voice artist
- Ronak Safazadeh, Iranian women's rights activist

== Surname ==
- Mohammad Ronak (born 1997), Indian cricketer
- Sai Ronak (born 1991), Indian actor and dancer
