= Pakistan at the 2012 Summer Paralympics =

- IPC code: PAK
- NPC: National Paralympic Committee of Pakistan

in London
- Competitors: 2 in 1 sport
- Medals: Gold 0 Silver 0 Bronze 0 Total 0

Summer Paralympics appearances (overview)
- 1992; 1996; 2000; 2004; 2008; 2012; 2016; 2020; 2024

Pakistan competed at the 2012 Summer Paralympics in London, United Kingdom from August 29 to September 9, 2012.

== Athletics ==
Men’s Track and Road Events

| Athlete | Event | Heat | | Final | |
| Athlete | Event | Result | Rank | Result | Rank |
|---|---|---|---|---|---|
| Haider Ali | 100m T38 | — | | 15.89 | 9 |
| Naeem Masih | 1500m T46 | 4:51.35 | 9 | did not advance | |

Men’s Field Events

| Athlete | Event | Distance | Rank |
|---|---|---|---|
| Haider Ali | Long Jump F37-38 | NM | |

== See also ==
- Pakistan at the 2012 Summer Olympics
