= Rigivan Ganeshamoorthy =

Italian Para athlete (born 1999)

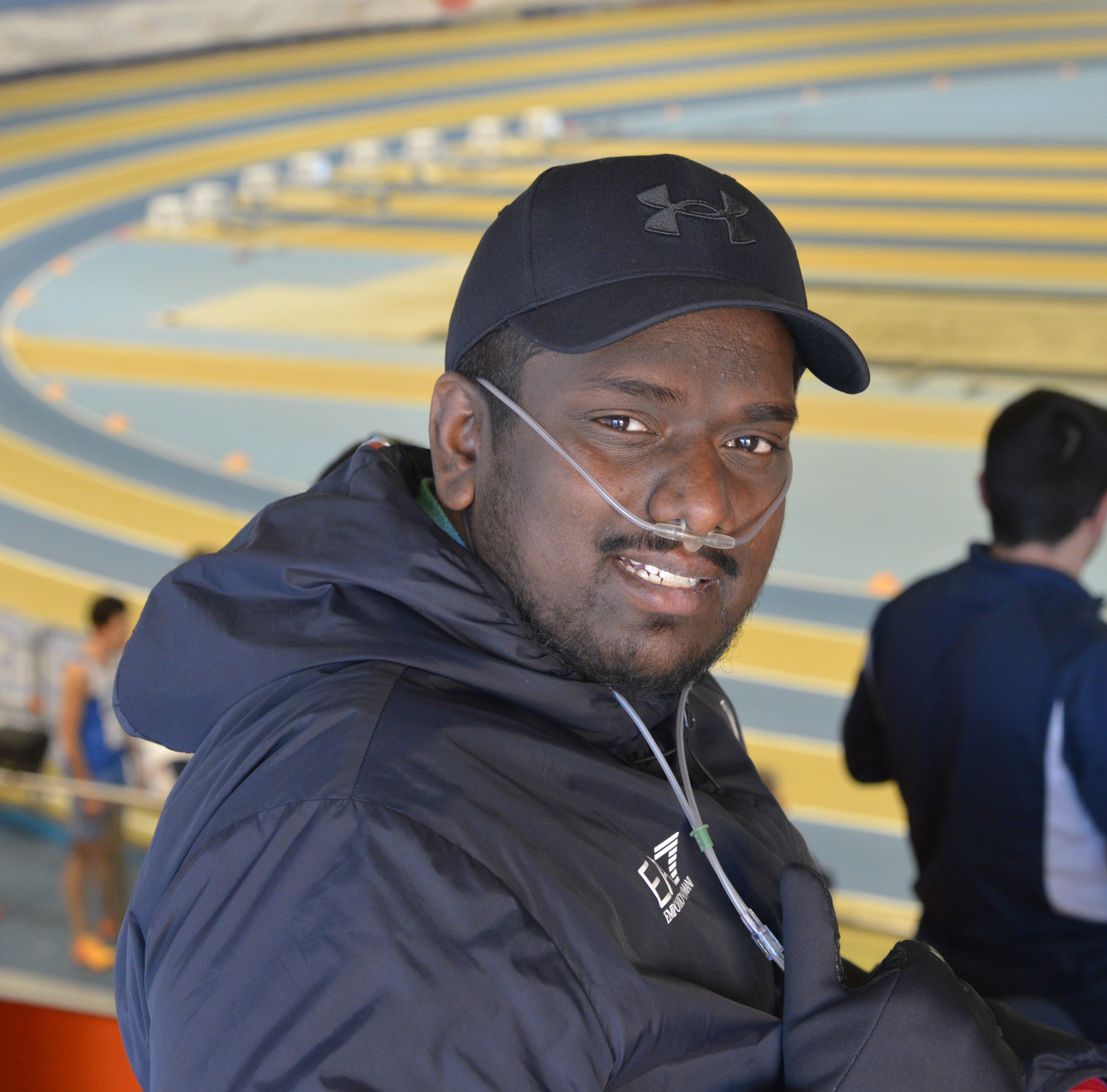
- Ganeshamoorthy at the 2025 Italian Championships

Personal information
- Born: 8 June 1999 (age 27) Rome, Italy

Sport
- Country: Italy
- Sport: Para athletics
- Disability: Guillain–Barré syndrome; tetraplegia
- Disability class: F52
- Events: Discus throw; shot put; javelin throw
- Club: A.S. Anthropos Civitanova Marche

Achievements and titles
- Personal bests: Javelin throw: 20.99 m (2024, WR); Discus throw: 27.06 m (2024, WR); Shot put: 11.73 m (2024)
Medal record
Para athletics
Representing Italy
Paralympic Games
Gold medal – first place	2024 Paris	Discus throw

Rigivan "Rigi" Ganeshamoorthy (Note: Italian: [ˈriːdʒi(vaŋ) ɡaneʃʃaˈmurti]; Tamil: ரிஜீவன் கணேசமூர்த்தி, pronounced [ɾiˈdʑiːʋan kaˈɳeːsamuːɾt̪ːi].) (Note: Ganeshamoorthy's hypocorism "Rigi" is also spelled "Riggi" reflecting the pronunciation in his native Romanesco dialect, where the /dʒ/ consonant is always geminated (i.e. [ˈɾidːʒi]).) (born 8 June 1999) is an Italian Para athlete competing in F52 throwing events. He represented Italy at the 2024 Summer Paralympics, winning a gold medal and setting a new world record in the discus throw.

== Early and personal life ==
Ganeshamoorthy was born in Rome to Sri Lankan Tamil parents, and grew up in the city's borough of Dragona, in the 10th municipality. He has an elder brother and a younger sister. In 2017, he was diagnosed with Guillain–Barré syndrome, which was aggravated by a cervical injury resulting from a fall in 2019. As a result, he became tetraplegic. Until then a sedentary person, after trying wheelchair basketball, fencing and water polo, he began practicing Para athletics, specializing in throwing. He was the Italian sabre champion in 2023.

Ganeshamoorthy's sister Thujana works at a foundation for people with disabilities in Ostia. As of June 2025, he had been in a three-year relationship with Alice, a singer also from Dragona. He was baptized a Roman Catholic in 2023. He is a supporter of soccer club A.S. Roma.

== Career ==
In 2023, Ganeshamoorthy was the Italian Paralympic champion in the shot put F55 and the discus throw F54–F55. The following year he was again Italian champion in the shot put and discus throw, setting the European Paralympic record F52 in both disciplines; he also holds the Paralympic world record F52 in the javelin throw, with a measurement of 20.99 m, which he set at the 2024 Italian championships in Brescia, and his personal best in the shot put (11.73 m) is 1 cm under the world record held by André Rocha.

In 2024, Ganeshamoorthy made his international debut at the Summer Paralympics, where he won the gold medal in the discus throw F52 upon breaking the Paralympic world record three times within the same competition: 25.48 m, 25.80 m and finally 27.06 m.

Ganeshamoorthy won three gold medals at the Italian championships in Ancona in June 2025. He is set to compete in the 12th World Para Athletics Championships, held in New Delhi in September 2025.
