= Pakistan at the 2024 Summer Paralympics =

- IPC code: PAK
- NPC: National Paralympic Committee of Pakistan
- Website: pakistanparalympic.org

in Paris, France
- Competitors: 1 in 1 sport
- Flag bearer: Haider Ali
- Medals Ranked 79th: Gold 0 Silver 0 Bronze 1 Total 1

Summer Paralympics appearances (overview)
- 1992; 1996; 2000; 2004; 2008; 2012; 2016; 2020; 2024

Pakistan competed at the 2024 Summer Paralympics in Paris, France, from 28 August to 8 September 2024.

== Medalists ==
| Medal | Name | Sport | Event | Date |
|---|---|---|---|---|
| 3rd place, bronze medalist(s) | Haider Ali | Athletics | Men's discus throw F37 | 6 September |

== Competitors ==
The following is the list of number of competitors in the Games.

| Sport | Men | Women | Total |
|---|---|---|---|
| Athletics | 1 | 0 | 1 |
| Total | 1 | 0 | 1 |

== Athletics ==
Haider Ali, Pakistan's three time paralympic medalist (and so far, the only medalist), qualified for the F37 discus throw.

Key

- Q = Qualified for the next round
- DQ = Disqualified
- PR = Paralympic Record
- AR = Area (or continental) Record
- NR = National Record
- SB = Season's Best

| Athlete | Event | Final | |
| Athlete | Event | Result | Rank |
|---|---|---|---|
| Haider Ali | Men's discus throw F37 | 52.54 | 3rd place, bronze medalist(s) |

== See also ==
- Pakistan at the 2024 Summer Olympics
