= Luis Carlos López Valenzuela =

Mexican para-athlete (born 1999)

Personal information
- Nationality: Mexican
- Born: 30 March 1999 (age 27)

Sport
- Sport: Para-athletics
- Disability class: F37
- Events: discus throw shot put
Medal record
Men's para-athletics
Representing Mexico
World Championships
Gold medal – first place	2025 New Delhi	Discus throw F37

Luis Carlos López Valenzuela (born 30 March 1999) is a Mexican para-athlete specializing in throwing events. He represented Mexico at the 2024 Summer Paralympics.

== Career ==
He represented Mexico at the 2024 Summer Paralympics and finished in fifth place in the shot put F57 event with a throw of 14.31 metres. He also finished in sixth place in the discus throw F37 event with a personal best throw of 50.31 metres. He competed at the 2025 World Para Athletics Championships and won a gold medal in the discus throw F37 event, with a championship record throw of 56.59 metres. He also competed in the shot put F37 event and set an American record with a throw of 14.91 metres.
