= Trinidad and Tobago at the 2016 Summer Paralympics =

- IPC code: TRI

in Rio de Janeiro
- Competitors: 3 in 2 sports
- Medals Ranked 56th: Gold 1 Silver 1 Bronze 1 Total 3

Summer Paralympics appearances (overview)
- 1984; 1988; 1992–2008; 2012; 2016; 2020; 2024

Trinidad and Tobago competed at the 2016 Summer Paralympics in Rio de Janeiro, Brazil, from 7 September to 18 September 2016.

== Disability classifications ==
Every participant at the Paralympics has their disability grouped into one of five disability categories; amputation, the condition may be congenital or sustained through injury or illness; cerebral palsy; wheelchair athletes, there is often overlap between this and other categories; visual impairment, including blindness; Les autres, any physical disability that does not fall strictly under one of the other categories, for example dwarfism or multiple sclerosis. Each Paralympic sport then has its own classifications, dependent upon the specific physical demands of competition. Events are given a code, made of numbers and letters, describing the type of event and classification of the athletes competing. Some sports, such as athletics, divide athletes by both the category and severity of their disabilities, other sports, for example swimming, group competitors from different categories together, the only separation being based on the severity of the disability.

== Competitors ==
The following table lists Trinidad and Tobago's delegation per sport and gender.

Sport	Men	Women	Total
Athletics	1	1	2
Swimming	0	1	1
Total	1	2	3

== Medalists ==
The following competitors from Trinidad and Tobago won medals at the games. In the by discipline sections below, medalists' names are bolded.

Medal	Name	Sport	Event	Date
Gold	Akeem Stewart	Athletics	Men's Javelin F42-44	9 September
Silver	Akeem Stewart	Athletics	Men's Discus F43-44	16 September
Bronze	Nyoshia Cain	Athletics	Women's 100 m T43-44	17 September

**Medals by sport**
**Sport**	1st place, gold medalist(s)	2nd place, silver medalist(s)	3rd place, bronze medalist(s)	**Total**
Athletics	1	1	1	3
**Total**	**1**	**1**	**1**	**3**

**Medals by day**
**Day**	1st place, gold medalist(s)	2nd place, silver medalist(s)	3rd place, bronze medalist(s)	**Total**
September 9	1	0	0	1
September 16	0	1	0	1
September 17	0	0	1	1
**Total**	**1**	**1**	**1**	**3**

== Athletics ==
Men's Field

Athlete	Event	#1	#2	#3	#4	#5	#6	Result	Rank
**Akeem Stewart**	Discus F43-44	56.03	61.70	60.83	60.82	60.53	**61.72**	**61.72**	2nd place, silver medalist(s)
**Akeem Stewart**	Javelin F42-44	57.23	56.64	56.84	53.94	55.77	**57.32**	**57.32** **WR**	1st place, gold medalist(s)

Women's Track

Athlete	Events	Heat		Final	
Athlete	Events	Time	Rank	Time	Rank
**Nyoshia Cain**	100 m T43-44	13.32	2 **Q**	13.10	3rd place, bronze medalist(s)
**Nyoshia Cain**	200 m T43-44	Disqualified		did not advance	

== Swimming ==
Women

Athlete	Events	Heats		Final	
Athlete	Events	Time	Rank	Time	Rank
Shanntol Ince	50 m freestyle S9	33.38	21	did not advance	
Shanntol Ince	100 m freestyle S9	1:12.41	23	did not advance	
Shanntol Ince	400 m freestyle S9	5:31.06	17	did not advance	
Shanntol Ince	100 m butterfly S9	1:20.12	19	did not advance	

== See also ==
- Trinidad and Tobago at the 2016 Summer Olympics
