= Rachael Marshall =

Trinidad and Tobago Paralympic athlete

Medal record

Paralympic athletics

Representing Trinidad and Tobago

Paralympic Games
Gold medal – first place	1984 New York	Javelin - L5
Gold medal – first place	1984 New York	Shot Put - L5

Swimming (L6)
Bronze medal – third place	1984 New York	100m Freestyle - L6

Rachael Marshall is a former Paralympian athlete from Trinidad and Tobago who competed mainly in category L5 throwing events.

She competed in the 1984 Summer Paralympics in New York City, United States. There she won a gold medal in the women's javelin throw L5 event, a gold medal in the women's shot put L5 event, a bronze medal in the women's 100 metres freestyle L6 event and finished fourth in the women's discus throw L5 event.

She is the only woman to have competed for Trinidad and Tobago at the Paralympics, and the only athlete to have won Paralympic medals for that country.

== See also ==
- Trinidad and Tobago at the Paralympics
