= Pardeep Kumar (discus thrower) =

Indian Paralympic athlete

Personal information
- Born: 15 February 1999 (age 27) Hisar, Haryana, India

Sport
- Sport: Para-athletics
- Disability class: F64
- Event: Discus throw
Medal record
Men's para-athletics
Representing India
World Championships
Bronze medal – third place	2025 New Delhi	Discus throw F64
Asian Para Games
Bronze medal – third place	2026 Aichi-Nagoya	Discus throw F64

Pardeep Kumar (born 15 February 1999) is an Indian para discus thrower who competes in F64 category.

== Early life ==
Born in Hisar, Kumar had been serving as a member of a Gorhka regiment in 2019, when on a patrolling duty, he fell victim to a landmine blast in Srinagar, in which he survived and had his left leg amputated. While recovering at a hospital, he was told he could do sports, motivating him. Kumar had visited a prosthetics centre to obtain artificial limbs and came to find out para athletes were training there. He was then introduced to javelin and discus throw.

== Career ==
When Kumar began his para-athletic career in 2019, he was originally given the F44 classification.

Kumar competed for his country at the 2022 Asian Para Games, held in 2023, although he did not medal.

In August 2025, Kumar was selected to represent India at the 2025 World Para Athletics Championships. He won a bronze medal in the discus throw F64 event, with a season best throw of 46.23 meters. He thus became the first Army para athlete to win a world medal.

In October 2026, Kumar competed at the Asian Para Games held in Nagoya, Japan and won a bronze medal.
