= Trinidad and Tobago at the 1984 Summer Paralympics =

- IPC code: TRI

in Stoke Mandeville/New York
- Competitors: 8
- Medals Ranked 29th: Gold 2 Silver 0 Bronze 1 Total 3

Summer Paralympics appearances (overview)
- 1984; 1988; 1992–2008; 2012; 2016; 2020; 2024

Trinidad and Tobago competed at the 1984 Summer Paralympics in Stoke Mandeville, Great Britain and New York City, United States. 8 competitors from Trinidad and Tobago won 3 medals, 2 gold and 1 bronze and finished 29th in the medal table.

== See also ==
- Trinidad and Tobago at the Paralympics
- Trinidad and Tobago at the 1984 Summer Olympics
