= Special Olympics Pakistan =

Pakistani nonprofit organisation for mentally and physically disabled athletes

- Sport: Special Olympics
- Jurisdiction: Pakistan
- Founded: 1989
- Affiliation: Special Olympics
- Affiliation date: 1989
- Regional affiliation: Asia Pacific
- Headquarters: Karachi
- President: Ms. Ronak Lakhani (Board Chair)

Official website
- specialolympics.pk
- (Pakistan)

Special Olympics Pakistan is an officially recognised program of Special Olympics International, operating as a Nonprofit organisation in Pakistan. It supports individuals with intellectual disabilities by promoting their development and inclusion through participation in sports.

== History ==
Special Olympics is an international nonprofit organisation dedicated to empowering individuals with intellectual disabilities to become fit, productive and respected members of the society through sports training and competition. Founded in 1968 by Eunice Kennedy Shriver, Special Olympics provides year-round sports training and competition to 2.5 million adults and children with intellectual disabilities across 180 countries.

Special Olympics Pakistan was established 1989 with around 20 registered athletes. The organization now has over 28,500 registered athletes, over 750 coaches and over 3,000 volunteers with more than 320 competitions held by 2018.

== Sports ==
Special Olympics Pakistan provides sports training and held Olympic styple competitions in 11 summer sports and 3 winter sports.

=== Summer Sports ===
- Aquatics
- Athletics
- Badminton
- Basketball
- Cricket
- Football
- Cycling
- Powerlifting
- Tennis
- Table Tennis
- Bocce

=== Winter Sports ===
- Cross-country skiing
- Floorball
- Snowshoeing

== Oath ==
Let me win- but if I cannot win, let me be brave in the attempt.

== Support ==
Annual Fundraising Gala is held and is one of the main sources of income along with donations and sponsorships.

== International Events participated in ==
- -Summer World Games 1991-Minnesota USA-16 Athletes.
- -World Games 1995- Connecticut, USA-26 Athletes.
- -First Asia Pacific Games 1996- Shanghai, China- 14 athletes.
- -World Games 1999- North Carolina, USA- 40 athletes.
- -World Games 2003- Dublin, Ireland -60 athletes.
- -Asia Pacific Cricket Tournament 2004- Ahmedabad, India- 14 athletes.
- -Ludhiana Games 2005- Ludhiana India- 46 athletes.
- -Delhi Games 2005- Delhi, India- 10 athletes.
- -China Invitation Games 2006- Shanghai, China- 10 athletes.
- -Special Olympics Cricket World Cup Tournament 2006- Mumbai, India- 44 athletes.
- -Special Olympics World Summer Game in Shanghai China 2007- 65 athletes.
- -Asia Pacific Bocce Competition 2008, Brunei Darussalam- 4 Athletes.
- -Ludhiana Games 2008- Ludhiana, India- 35 athletes.
- -Special Olympics Bharat International Cricket Carnival in Delhi, India 2009-14 athletes.
- -Special Olympics World Summer Games Athens, Greece 2011- 58 Athletes.
- -Special Olympics Asia Pacific Games; Newcastle, Australia 2013 -59 Athletes.
- -Special Olympics Asia Pacific Qualified of the 2014 Football Unified Cup, Bangkok Thailand 21 Athletes.

== See also ==
- National Paralympic Committee of Pakistan
- Pakistan at the Paralympics
