= Trinidad and Tobago at the 2012 Summer Paralympics =

- IPC code: TRI

in London
- Competitors: 2 in 2 sports
- Medals: Gold 0 Silver 0 Bronze 0 Total 0

Summer Paralympics appearances (overview)
- 1984; 1988; 1992–2008; 2012; 2016; 2020; 2024

Trinidad and Tobago competed at the 2012 Summer Paralympics in London, United Kingdom, from August 29 to September 9. The country returned to the Paralympic Games after a 24-year absence, having last competed in 1988 and then missed five consecutive editions of the Summer Games.

Carlos Green, who is blind, has received a wild card invitation to compete in the shot-put, while Shanntol Ince has received a wild-card to compete in swimming. Ince "was born with her right leg significantly shorter than her left".

== Disability classifications ==
Every participant at the Paralympics has their disability grouped into one of five disability categories; amputation (the condition may be congenital or sustained through injury or illness); cerebral palsy; wheelchair athletes (there is often overlap between this and other categories); visual impairment, including blindness; and Les autres, any physical disability that does not fall strictly under one of the other categories, for example dwarfism or multiple sclerosis. Each Paralympic sport then has its own classifications, dependent upon the specific physical demands of competition. Events are given a code, made of numbers and letters, describing the type of event and classification of the athletes competing. Some sports, such as athletics, divide athletes by both the category and severity of their disabilities, other sports, for example swimming, group competitors from different categories together, the only separation being based on the severity of the disability.

== Athletics ==
Men’s Field Events

Athlete	Event	Distance	Points	Rank
Ronald Greene	Shot Put F11-12	10.87	807	11
Ronald Greene	Discus Throw F11	26.28	—N/a	11

== Swimming ==
Women

Athletes	Event	Heat		Final	
Athletes	Event	Time	Rank	Time	Rank
Shanntol Ince	400m freestyle S9	5:27.88	11	did not advance	
Shanntol Ince	100m backstroke S9	1:22.14	10	did not advance	
Shanntol Ince	100m butterfly S9	1:25.50	12	did not advance	

== See also ==
- Trinidad and Tobago at the Paralympics
- Trinidad and Tobago at the 2012 Summer Olympics
