= Haider Ali (athlete) =

Pakistani Paralympic athlete

Haider Ali SI PLY
Personal information
- Born: 12 December 1984 (age 41) Gujranwala, Pakistan
Medal record
Men's para-athletics
Representing Pakistan
Event	1st	2nd	3rd
Paralympic Games	1	1	2
World Championships	–	1	–
Asian Para Games	4	1	2
Total	5	3	4
Paralympic Games
Gold medal – first place	2020 Tokyo	Discus throw F37
Silver medal – second place	2008 Beijing	Long jump F37/38
Bronze medal – third place	2016 Rio	Long jump T37
Bronze medal – third place	2024 Paris	Discus throw F37
World Championships
Silver medal – second place	2019 Dubai	Discus throw F37
Asian Para Games
Gold medal – first place	2010 Guangzhou	Long jump F37/38
Gold medal – first place	2018 Jakarta	Discus Throw F37
Gold medal – first place	2018 Jakarta	Javelin Throw F37/38
Gold medal – first place	2022 Hangzhou	Discus Throw F37
Silver medal – second place	2026 Aichi-Nagoya	Discus Throw F37
Bronze medal – third place	2010 Guangzhou	100 meters T38
Bronze medal – third place	2018 Jakarta	Long Jump T37/38

Haider Ali SI PLY (born 12 December 1984 in Gujranwala) is an all-around Pakistani para-athlete who created history at the 2008 Summer Paralympics in Beijing, China by winning Pakistan's first ever Paralympic Games medal, a silver. He also shared a new world record with his jump of 6.44 meters at the Games. He has competed at the Paralympics on five occasions in 2008, 2012, 2016, 2020 and 2024. He has the unique record of winning a country's first ever Paralympic gold, silver and bronze medals and remains the only Pakistani athlete to win a medal in Paralympic history. On 3 September 2021, he became the first gold medalist for Pakistan at the Paralympics. In 2019, he became the first Pakistani para-athlete to win a medal at the World Championships, a silver. He is also a four-time Asian Para Games gold medalist.

== Early life ==
Born with cerebral palsy, Haider Ali's athletic potential was discovered by sports officials in 2005 at a training camp in Faisalabad. Following classification by Dr. Rabab, Ali received specialized training in track and field events, including long jump, discus throw, high jump, 100m, and 200m. His talent flourished, leading to a successful international debut at the 2006 FESPIC Games in Kuala Lumpur, where he won one gold and three silver medals. Since 2006, Coach Akbar Ali Mughal has been a constant presence in Ali's career, guiding him to achieve his full potential.

== Career ==
=== 2008 Summer Paralympics ===
Haider, who has cerebral palsy, took part in F-37/38 Category men's long jump and covered a distance of 6.44 meters, winning a silver medal at the 2008 Summer Paralympics. A Tunisian athlete, Farhat Chida, who covered the same distance, won a gold medal because he made six successful jumps overall, whereas Haider's second and fifth jumps were rejected but he managed to equal Chida in his last attempt. Haider's medal achievement was Pakistan's first Paralympic medal and was also Pakistan's first silver medal at the Paralympics.

Both Haider and Farhat Chida scored a total of 1104 points each through their 6.44 meter jump, which is also a new world record in the games for people with disabilities.

In addition to the T-38 Category, Haider also participated in three other events. In the 100 meter T38 sprint he was ranked ninth among nine runners, in the 200 meters against 7 runners he came in fifth and in the Discus Throw F37/38, where he was close to winning a bronze medal but his points tally of 986 fell just seven short of Dong Xia of China, who compiled 1003 points and took third place.

=== Asian Para Games ===
In the 2010 Games in Guangzhou, Ali won a gold in Long Jump F37 and a bronze in 100m T38. In 2018, he won two gold medals in the Discus Throw F37 and Javelin Throw F37/38, as well as a bronze in Long Jump T37/38. He repeated his gold medal feat in Discus at the 2022 Asian Para Games in Hangzhou. He won a silver medal in the men's discus throw F37 at the 2026 Asian Para Games in Nagoya, Japan, with a best throw of 57.20 meters.

=== 2012 Summer Paralympics ===
London 2012 was the only Paralympics he has left without a medal so far, apparently troubled by a hamstring injury. He finished 9th in the 100 m T38 final and recorded NM in the F37–38 long jump.

=== 2016 Summer Paralympics ===
He claimed the second Paralympic medal of his career when he secured a bronze in T37 long jump event at the 2016 Summer Paralympics. It was also Pakistan's first ever bronze medal at the Paralympics. He was also the flag bearer for Pakistan during the opening ceremony of the Rio Paralympics.

=== 2019 World Para Athletics Championships ===
In 2019, he became the first Pakistani Para athlete to win a medal at the World Para Athletics Championships, a silver in F37 category discus throw event at dubai.

=== 2020 Summer Paralympics ===
On 3 September 2021, Haider Ali won the first-ever gold medal for Pakistan in Paralympics history with a throw of 55.26 metres in discus throw to win F37 event at the 2020 Summer Paralympics.

=== 2024 Summer Paralympics ===
Haider Ali won a bronze medal with his season-best throw in the Men's discus throw F37 at the Paris Paralympics Games 2024.

He made a throw of 52.54 meters in his sixth attempt, which earned him third spot in the final of the competition at the Stade de France.

=== 2026 World Para Athletics Grand Prix Dubai ===
Haider Ali clinched gold in the discus throw at the World Para Athletics Grand Prix on February 11, 2026. His 54.71 m throw outperformed athletes from over 50 countries, marking another major international success for Pakistan.

== Awards and recognition ==
In May 2026, Ali was conferred the Sitara-e-Imtiaz in recognition of his outstanding contributions to Paralympic sport and his role in bringing international recognition to Pakistan. He dedicated the honour to his parents, crediting their sacrifices, encouragement, and prayers as instrumental to his success.

Ribbon	Decoration	Country	Year
	Sitara-e-Imtiaz	Pakistan	2026

== See also ==
- Athletics in Pakistan
- Pakistan at the Paralympics
- Pakistan at the Asian Para Games
