= Brazil at the 2025 World Para Athletics Championships =

- IPC code: BRA
- NPC: Brazilian Paralympic Committee
- Website: www.cpb.org.br

in New Delhi, India September 27, 2025 – October 5, 2025
- Competitors: 50
- Flag bearer: Rayane Soares da Silva
- Medals Ranked 1st: Gold 15 Silver 20 Bronze 9 Total 44

Summer appearances
- 2023; 2024; 2025

Brazil is participating in the 2025 World Para Athletics Championships, being held in New Delhi, India from 27 September to 5 October 2025. The Brazilian contingent consists of 50 athletes.

== Track events ==
Legend:

- Note – Ranks given for track events are only within the athlete's heat.
- Q = Qualified for the next round
- q = Qualified for the next round as the fastest loser or, in field events, by position without achieving the qualifying target.
- DSQ = Disqualified
- DNF = Did Not Finish
- WR = World Record
- CR = Championship Record
- AR = Area (or Continental) Record
- PB = Personal Best
- SB = Season's Best

=== Men ===
Athlete	Event	Heats		Semi-final		Final	
Athlete	Event	Result	Rank	Result	Rank	Result	Rank
Joeferson Marinho de Oliveira	100m T12	11.08	1Q				
Kesley Teodoro	100m T12	11.06	1Q				
Fabrício Barros Ferreira	100m T13	11.02	2Q				
Christian Gabriel Costa	100m T37	11.28 ~~PB~~	1Q	—N/a		11.23 PB	2nd place, silver medalist(s)
Edson Cavalcante	100m T37	11.98	3	Did not advance to next round			
Ricardo Gomes de Mendonça	100m T37	11.25 ~~CR~~	1Q	—N/a		11.16 CR	1st place, gold medalist(s)
Matheus de Lima	100m T44	11.36 ~~SB~~	1Q	—N/a		10.99 AR	2nd place, silver medalist(s)
Alan Oliveira Becker	100m T64	11.06 ~~SB~~	2Q	—N/a		11.05 SB	4
Wallison André Fortes	100m T64	11.50	3	Did not advance to next round			
Vinícius Cabral	100m T71	—N/a				22.43	2nd place, silver medalist(s)
João Matos Cunha	100m T72	15.33 AR	1Q	—N/a		15.76	2nd place, silver medalist(s)
Vinicius Krieger	100m T72	17.89	3Q	—N/a		17.37	5
Henrique Caetano Nascimento	200m T35	24.14	2Q				
Bartolomeu Chaves	200m T37	23.57 ~~SB~~	3Q	—N/a		23.10 PB	2nd place, silver medalist(s)
Christian Gabriel Costa	200m T37	23.46 SB	1Q	—N/a		DNS	
Ricardo Gomes de Mendonça	200m T37	23.30	1Q	—N/a		22.77 SB	1st place, gold medalist(s)
Daniel Tavares Martins	400m T20	48.42	4q	—N/a		47.50	2nd place, silver medalist(s)
Samuel Oliveira Conceição	400m T20	50.15	6	Did not advance to next round			
Bartolomeu Chaves	400m T37	52.32	3q				
João Matos Cunha	400m T72	1:10.71	2Q	—N/a		1:07.23	2nd place, silver medalist(s)
Vinicius Krieger	400m T72	DSQ		Did not advance to next round			
Júlio Cesar Agripino	1500m T11	4:09.51 ~~SB~~	1Q	—N/a		4:05.61 SB	2nd place, silver medalist(s)
Yeltsin Jacques	1500m T11	4:08.94	1Q	—N/a		4:02.02 CR	1st place, gold medalist(s)
Jean Oliveira da Silva	1500m T13	4:19.16 SB	5q				
Júlio Cesar Agripino	5000m T11	—N/a				DNF	
Yeltsin Jacques	5000m T11	—N/a				15:29.73 SB	2nd place, silver medalist(s)

=== Women ===
Athlete	Event	Heats		Semi-final		Final	
Athlete	Event	Result	Rank	Result	Rank	Result	Rank
Clara Barros	100m T12	2 Oct; 05:38 PM					
Daniele Jesus dos Santos	100m T12	2 Oct; 05:54 PM					
Lorraine Gomes de Aguiar	100m T12	2 Oct; 05:46 PM					
Veronica Hipolito	100m T36	29 Sept					
Maria Clara Augusto	100m T47	—N/a				29 Sept	
Antônia Keyla	1500m T20	—N/a				2 Oct; 07:55 PM	

== Field events ==
Legend:

- Note – Ranks given for track events are only within the athlete's heat.
- Q = Qualified for the next round
- q = Qualified for the next round as the fastest loser or, in field events, by position without achieving the qualifying target.
- DSQ = Disqualified
- WR = World Record
- CR = Championship Record
- PB = Personal Best
- SB = Season's Best

=== Men ===
Athlete	Event	Qualification		Final	
Athlete	Event	Result	Rank	Result	Rank
André Rocha	Discus Throw F52	—N/a		18.79	2nd place, silver medalist(s)
Claudiney Batista	Discus Throw F56	—N/a		45.67	1st place, gold medalist(s)
Cícero Nobre	Javelin Throw F57	—N/a		49.45	4
Alessandro Rodrigo Silva	Shot Put F11	—N/a		12.02	6

=== Women ===
Athlete	Event	Qualification		Final	
Athlete	Event	Result	Rank	Result	Rank
Giovanna Boscolo	Club Throw F32	—N/a		27.09	3rd place, bronze medalist(s)
Wanna Helena Brito	Club Throw F32	—N/a		21.84	8
Giovanna Boscolo	Shot Put F32	—N/a		2 Oct; 05:10 PM	
Wanna Helena Brito	Shot Put F32	—N/a		2 Oct; 05:10 PM	
