= Andrés Mosquera (discus thrower) =

Colombian para-athlete (born 1985)

Personal information
- Full name: Andrés Felipe Mosquera Neira
- Nationality: Colombian
- Born: 13 May 1985 (age 41)

Sport
- Sport: Para-athletics
- Disability class: F44
- Event: discus throw
Medal record
Representing Colombia
Men's para-athletics
World Championships
Gold medal – first place	2025 New Delhi	Discus throw F44

Andrés Felipe Mosquera Neira (born 13 May 1985) is a Colombian para-athlete specializing in discus throw. He represented Colombia at the 2024 Summer Paralympics.

== Career ==
Mosquera represented Colombia at the 2024 Summer Paralympics and finished in fourth place in the discus throw F64 with a throw of 57.59 metres. He competed at the 2025 World Para Athletics Championships and won a gold medal in the discus throw F44 event.
