= Athletics at the 2024 Summer Paralympics – Men's discus throw =

Men's discus throw at the XVII Paralympic Games
- Venue: Stade de France
- Dates: 1 – 6 September 2024

The men's discus throw event at the 2024 Summer Paralympics in Paris, took place between 1 and 6 September 2024 at the Stade de France.

== Schedule ==
F	Final

Date	Fri 30		Sat 31		Sun 1		Mon 2		Tue 3		Wed 4		Thu 5		Fri 6		Sat 7	
Event	M	E	M	E	M	E	M	E	M	E	M	E	M	E	M	E	M	E
Discus throw F11													F					
Discus throw F37															F			
Discus throw F52						F												
Discus throw F56							F											
Discus throw F64														F				

== Medal summary ==
=== Medal table ===
* Host nation (France)

Rank	NPC	Gold	Silver	Bronze	Total
1	Italy	2	0	0	2
2	Brazil	1	0	1	2
2	United States	1	0	1	2
4	Uzbekistan	1	0	0	1
5	Canada	0	1	0	1
5	India	0	1	0	1
5	Iran	0	1	0	1
5	Latvia	0	1	0	1
5	Trinidad and Tobago	0	1	0	1
10	Greece	0	0	1	1
10	Pakistan	0	0	1	1
10	Spain	0	0	1	1
Totals (12 entries)		5	5	5	15

=== Medalists ===
The following is a summary of the medals awarded across all discus throw events.

Classification	Gold		Silver		Bronze	
F11	Oney Tapia; Italy	41.92	Hassan Bajoulvand; Iran	41.75 PB	Alvaro del Amo Cano; Spain	39.60 PB
F37	Tolibboy Yuldashev; Uzbekistan	57.28 PB	Jesse Zesseu; Canada	53.24	Haider Ali; Pakistan	52.54 SB
F52	Rigivan Ganeshamoorthy; Italy	27.06 WR	Aigars Apinis; Latvia	20.62 SB	André Rocha; Brazil	19.48
F56	Claudiney Batista; Brazil	46.86 PR	Yogesh Kathuniya; India	42.22 SB	Konstantinos Tzounis; Greece	41.32
F64	Jeremy Campbell; United States	61.14 PR	Akeem Stewart; Trinidad and Tobago	59.66 SB	David Blair; United States	57.76

== Results ==
=== F11 ===
==== Records ====
Prior to the competition, the existing records were as follows:

F11
World Record	Alessandro da Silva (BRA)	46.24	(France) Paris	10 Jun 2022
Paralympic Record	Alessandro da Silva (BRA)	43.16	(Japan) Tokyo	2 September 2021

==== Results ====
The competition in this classification took place on 5 September 2024, at 12:06:

Rank	Name	Nationality	Class	1	2	3	4	5	6	Best	Notes
1st place, gold medalist(s)	Oney Tapia	Italy	F11	37.11	35.37	39.65	33.91	41.92	39.09	41.92	
2nd place, silver medalist(s)	Hassan Bajoulvand	Iran	F11	37.24	41.75	36.89	X	39.26	40.44	41.75	PB
3rd place, bronze medalist(s)	Alvaro del Amo Cano	Spain	F11	39.09	38.63	37.90	36.74	35.28	39.60	39.60	PB
4	Mahdi Olad	Iran	F11	27.22	X	X	X	39.15	36.22	39.15	
5	Alessandro Rodrigo Silva	Brazil	F11	X	X	38.01	37.93	29.96	38.84	38.84	
6	Bil Marinkovic	Austria	F11	35.11	X	X	38.14	X	X	38.14	SB
7	Igor Baskakov	Neutral Paralympic Athletes	F11	31.44	28.35	X	31.39	X	29.44	31.39	

=== F37 ===
==== Records ====
Prior to the competition, the existing records were as follows:

F37
World Record	Khusniddin Norbekov (UZB)	59.75	(Brazil) Rio de Janeiro	8 September 2016
Paralympic Record	Khusniddin Norbekov (UZB)	43.16	(Brazil) Rio de Janeiro	8 September 2016

==== Results ====
The competition in this classification took place on 6 September 2024, at 12:00:

Rank	Name	Nationality	Class	1	2	3	4	5	6	Best	Notes
1st place, gold medalist(s)	Tolibboy Yuldashev	Uzbekistan	F37	48.97	X	50.89	53.48	56.03	57.28	57.28	PB
2nd place, silver medalist(s)	Jesse Zesseu	Canada	F37	51.40	51.26	52.81	X	X	53.24	53.24	
3rd place, bronze medalist(s)	Haider Ali	Pakistan	F37	52.28	X	X	X	X	52.54	52.54	SB
4	Yamato Shimbo	Japan	F37	51.37	X	X	49.21	X	X	51.37	
5	Edwars Alexander Varela Meza	Venezuela	F37	47.70	46.04	49.80	50.89	X	47.12	50.89	
6	Luis Carlos López	Mexico	F37	45.79	X	48.01	X	50.31	48.38	50.31	PB
7	Mykola Zhabnyak	Ukraine	F37	38.20	44.95	49.25	X	46.24	47.58	49.25	SB
8	Guy Henly	Australia	F37	47.88	X	48.58	X	X	44.91	48.58	
9	Kudratillokhon Marufkhujaev	Uzbekistan	F37	X	X	46.79				46.79	
10	Donatas Dundzys	Lithuania	F37	40.41	42.72	44.45				44.45	SB

=== F52 ===
==== Records ====
Prior to the competition, the existing records were as follows:

F51
World Record	Benjamin Cardenas (CHI)	13.40	(Switzerland) Nottwil	26 May 2023
Paralympic Record	Mohamed Berrahal (ALG)	12.74	(Japan) Tokyo	29 August 2021

F52
World Record	André Rocha (BRA)	23.80	(United Kingdom) London	18 June 2017
Paralympic Record	Aigars Apinis (LAT)	21.00	(United Kingdom) London	6 September 2012

==== Results ====
The competition in this classification took place on 1 September 2024, at 19:24:

Rank	Name	Nationality	Class	1	2	3	4	5	6	Best	Notes
1st place, gold medalist(s)	Rigivan Ganeshamoorthy	Italy	F52	X	25.48	25.80	27.06	22.10	24.10	27.06	WR
2nd place, silver medalist(s)	Aigars Apinis	Latvia	F52	20.21	19.49	X	20.62	20.38	X	20.62	SB
3rd place, bronze medalist(s)	André Rocha	Brazil	F52	18.73	17.76	19.48	X	18.04	15.76	19.48	
4	Velimir Šandor	Croatia	F52	17.35	17.63	17.89	18.03	17.85	17.42	18.03	
5	Rafal Rocki	Poland	F52	17.92	16.74	16.08	X	16.03	15.91	17.92	
6	Robert Jachimowicz	Poland	F52	X	17.20	17.37	17.69	17.06	16.89	17.69	
7	Henrik Plank	Slovenia	F52	X	13.31	13.14	13.33	13.21	13.15	13.33	
8	Uladzislau Hryb	Neutral Paralympic Athletes	F51	11.39	10.84	11.32	12.28	12.05	11.58	12.28	SB
9	Mohamed Berrahal	Algeria	F51	X	11.27	11.57	10.86	12.07	11.91	12.07	
10	Grigorios Ntislis	Greece	F52	11.75	11.89	11.60	10.73	11.33	10.98	11.89	

=== F56 ===
==== Records ====
Prior to the competition, the existing records were as follows:

F56
World Record	Claudiney Batista (BRA)	47.37	(Brazil) São Paulo	18 June 2023
Paralympic Record	Claudiney Batista (BRA)	45.59	(Japan) Tokyo	30 August 2021

==== Results ====
The competition in this classification took place on 2 September 2024, at 10:10:

Rank	Name	Nationality	Class	1	2	3	4	5	6	Best	Notes
1st place, gold medalist(s)	Claudiney Batista	Brazil	F56	44.74	46.45	45.45	45.89	46.86	45.57	46.86	PR
2nd place, silver medalist(s)	Yogesh Kathuniya	India	F56	42.22	41.50	41.55	40.33	40.89	39.68	42.22	SB
3rd place, bronze medalist(s)	Konstantinos Tzounis	Greece	F56	X	39.14	X	39.90	41.32	37.87	41.32	
4	Dušan Laczkó	Slovakia	F56	41.20	40.76	39.09	39.04	39.29	40.40	41.20	
	Nebojša Đurić	Serbia	F56	DNS							

=== F64 ===
==== Records ====
Prior to the competition, the existing records were as follows:

F64
World Record	Jeremy Campbell (USA)	65.86	(United States) Arizona	30 May 2021
Paralympic Record	vacant			

==== Results ====
The competition in this classification took place on 5 September 2024, at 19:03:

Rank	Name	Nationality	Class	1	2	3	4	5	6	Best	Notes
1st place, gold medalist(s)	Jeremy Campbell	United States	F64	60.46	59.90	59.86	60.26	X	61.14	61.14	PR
2nd place, silver medalist(s)	Akeem Stewart	Trinidad and Tobago	F43	59.66	X	X	56.55	58.89	57.09	59.66	SB
3rd place, bronze medalist(s)	David Blair	United States	F44	57.71	56.75	X	56.69	57.76	X	57.76	
4	Andrés Mosquera	Colombia	F44	56.20	55.24	56.56	X	X	57.59	57.59	
5	Ivan Katanušić	Croatia	F64	52.84	51.62	52.80	54.28	X	X	54.28	SB
6	Dan Greaves	Great Britain	F44	53.50	53.45	X	X	49.48	52.94	53.50	
7	Harrison Walsh	Great Britain	F44	46.27	49.23	50.44	X	X	X	50.44	
8	Egert Jõesaar	Estonia	F44	50.09	49.90	49.87	49.45	X	X	50.09	
