= Trinidad and Tobago at the 1988 Summer Paralympics =

- IPC code: TRI

in Seoul
- Competitors: 4 in 3 sports
- Medals: Gold 0 Silver 0 Bronze 0 Total 0

Summer Paralympics appearances (overview)
- 1984; 1988; 1992–2008; 2012; 2016; 2020; 2024

Trinidad and Tobago competed at the 1988 Summer Paralympics in Seoul, South Korea. The delegation consisted of four competitors: one track and field athlete, one table tennis player, and two weightlifters.

Trinidad and Tobago has not returned to the Paralympic Games since that date.

== Athletics ==
Athlete	Event	Heats		Semifinal		Final	
Athlete	Event	Time	Rank	Time	Rank	Time	Rank
Peter Tudor	Men's 200 m 4	38.63	7	did not advance			

== Table tennis ==
Athlete	Event	Round 1	Round 2	Round 3	Quarterfinals	Semifinals	Final	
Athlete	Event	Opposition Result	Opposition Result	Opposition Result	Opposition Result	Opposition Result	Opposition Result	Rank
Stephen Abraham	Men's singles 3	Robinson (GBR); L 0-2	Ho (HKG); L 0-2	Kang (KOR); L 0-2	did not advance			

== Weightlifting ==
Athlete	Event	Weight	Rank
Bernard Beaumont	Men's 75 kg	150	7
Peter Loveland	Men's 57 kg	No mark received	

== See also ==
- Trinidad and Tobago at the 1988 Summer Olympics
