= Max Rohn =

American para-athlete (born 1987)

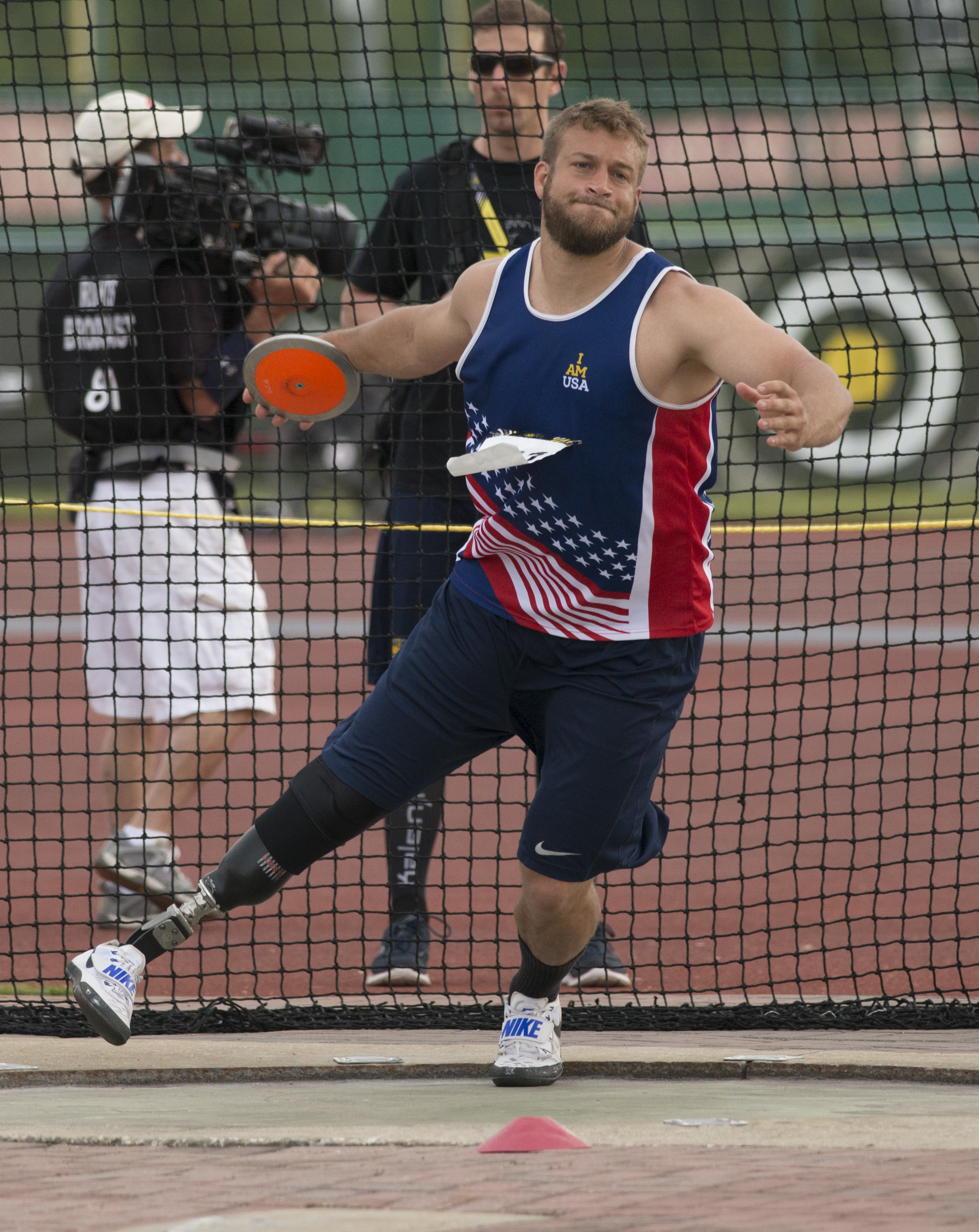
- Rohn in 2016

Personal information
- Nationality: American
- Born: July 23, 1987 (age 39)
- Home town: Longmont, Colorado, U.S.

Sport
- Sport: Para-athletics
- Disability class: F64
- Event: Discus throw
Medal record
Representing the United States
Men's para-athletics
World Championships
Silver medal – second place	2025 New Delhi	Discus throw F64
Parapan American Games
Silver medal – second place	2023 Santiago	Discus throw F64

Max Rohn (born July 23, 1987) is an American para-athlete specializing in discus throw.

== Career ==
Rohn made his international debut for the United States at the 2023 Parapan American Games and won a silver medal in the discus throw F64 event. In March 2024, he competed at the 2024 National Championships and won a gold medal in the discus throw F64 event.

On August 3, 2025, he was selected to represent the United States at the 2025 World Para Athletics Championships. He won a silver medal in the discus throw F64 event, with a season best throw of 50.92 meters.

== Personal life ==
In January 2009, Rohn was deployed to Fallujah, Iraq, as an active-duty Navy corpsman with the Police Transition Team. In May 2009, a vehicle he was in was struck by a rocket-propelled grenade. He suffered injuries to his right forearm, right leg, left leg, and loss of consciousness due to a traumatic brain injury. He was then transported to Walter Reed National Military Medical Center and underwent ten surgeries to try and save his right leg. After the tenth surgery, his right leg suffered a staph infection because of a medical clamp being left from a previous surgery. The vascular clamp had grown encapsulated within his leg because of heterotopic ossification. This resulted in damage to the bone, tissue, and the nerves in his right lower leg. Due to the loss of function, pain, and swelling from the surgery, his leg was eventually amputated below the knee on August 15, 2011.
