= Ronak Lakhani =

Philanthropist

- Occupations: Philanthropist; Founder and Chairperson, Special Olympics Pakistan
- Years active: 1989 - present
- Spouse: Iqbal Ali Lakhani

Ronak Lakhani is a Pakistani philanthropist. Since 2016, she has been chairperson of its board.

== Personal life ==
Lakhani was born in India, where she completed her post-graduate education from Nirmala Niketan Mumbai. She lived in India for 21 years before moving to Pakistan.

== Community work ==
Lakhani has been a supporter of inclusivity for disabled people in Pakistan. "Inclusivity is not a topic to have a conversation on, it is a practice that needs to be a part of our culture” she said. A founder of Special Olympics Pakistan (SOP), Lakhani has been associated with it for 31 years.

Lakhani founded SOP in 1991 when she first volunteered at the City Games in Karachi. The event was organized for the mentally and physically disabled. The event set inspiration for the SOP. Special Olympics is now the world’s largest sports organization for athletes with intellectual disabilities and provides year round training to them in nearly 172 countries.

Lakhani was on the board of directors in 2003 and then became the General Secretary of SOP in April 2007. In August 2015 she was elected as a chairperson. Her term as a chairperson for Special Olympics Pakistan officially started on 2016. She is now also on the advisory committee of SOP.

Lakhani has also served as a Head of Delegation in numerous World Games. She is also a board member of multiple organization that are related to health and sports.

She is also the founding Executive Committee members of NOWPDP. The organization helps promote an inclusive society through sustainable undertakings in the areas of education and economic empowerment.

SOP has regularly been competing in World Games since 1991. The organization now has over 16,104 athletes registered in Pakistan.

Lakhani is also Vice President of the Karachi Women's Swimming Association.

== Awards ==
To honor her services and dedication for the disabled people in Pakistan; the government of Pakistan awarded Lakhani with Sitara-e-Imtiaz award; the fourth highest award given to any civilian for extraordinary achievements on March 23, 2016.
