= Yamato Shimbo =

Japanese para-athlete (born 2000)

Personal information
- Nationality: Japanese
- Born: 23 July 2000 (age 25)

Sport
- Sport: Para-athletics
- Disability class: F37
- Event: discus throw
Medal record
Men's para-athletics
Representing Japan
World Championships
Silver medal – second place	2025 New Delhi	Discus throw F37
Bronze medal – third place	2024 Kobe	Discus throw F37
Asian Para Games
Silver medal – second place	2022 Hangzhou	Discus throw F37

Yamato Shimbo (born 23 July 2000) is a Japanese para-athlete specializing in discus throw. He represented Japan at the 2024 Summer Paralympics.

== Career ==
In May 2024, Shimbo competed at the 2024 World Para Athletics Championships and won a bronze medal in the discus throw F37 event. In September 2024, he represented Japan at the 2024 Summer Paralympics and finished in fourth place in the discus throw F37 event with a throw of 51.37 metres. He again competed at the 2025 World Para Athletics Championships and won a silver medal in the discus throw F37 event.
