= Athletics at the 2022 Commonwealth Games – Men's discus throw (F44)/(F64) =

Men's discus throw (F44)/(F64) at the 2022 Commonwealth Games
- Venue: Alexander Stadium
- Dates: 3 August
- Competitors: 7 from 5 nations
- Winning points: 1072

Medalists
| gold medal | Aled Davies | Wales |
| silver medal | Palitha Bandara | Sri Lanka |
| bronze medal | Harrison Walsh | Wales |

The men's discus throw (F44)/(F64) at the 2022 Commonwealth Games, as part of the athletics programme, took place in the Alexander Stadium on 3 August 2022.

== Records ==
Prior to this competition, the existing world and Games records were as follows:

Records F42
| World record | Aled Davies (GBR) | 54.14 m | Grosseto, Italy | 14 June 2016 |
Records F44
| World record | David Blair (USA) | 64.26 m | Tucson, United States | 20 May 2021 |

== Schedule ==
The schedule was as follows:

| Date | Time | Round |
|---|---|---|
| Wednesday 3 August 2022 | 20:45 | Final |

All times are British Summer Time (UTC+1)

== Results ==
=== Final ===
The medals were determined in the final.

| Rank | Name | Sport class | #1 | #2 | #3 | #4 | #5 | #6 | Result | Points | Notes |
|---|---|---|---|---|---|---|---|---|---|---|---|
| 1st place, gold medalist(s) | Aled Davies (WAL) | F42 | 49.96 | 50.82 | x | 50.10 | 51.39 | 50.86 | 51.39 | 1072 | GR |
| 2nd place, silver medalist(s) | Palitha Bandara (SRI) | F42 | 39.54 | 41.48 | 41.88 | 43.13 | 44.20 | x | 44.20 | 944 | PB |
| 3rd place, bronze medalist(s) | Harrison Walsh (WAL) | F44 | 51.19 | 52.45 | 54.76 | 51.48 | x | 50.97 | 54.76 | 915 | GR |
| 4 | Dan Greaves (ENG) | F44 | 51.82 | 53.81 | 53.48 | 52.67 | 54.66 | x | 54.66 | 913 | |
| 5 | Devendra Gahlot (IND) | F42 | 41.46 | 42.13 | 39.83 | x | x | 41.94 | 42.13 | 891 | PB |
| 6 | Kennedy Ezeji (NGR) | F42 | 37.93 | 34.43 | x | 38.33 | x | 38.76 | 38.76 | 785 | PB |
| 7 | Devender Kumar (IND) | F44 | x | 45.10 | x | x | 46.28 | x | 46.28 | 695 | |
| | Aneesh Pillai (IND) | F44 | Did not start | | | | | | | | |
