= Hassan Bajoulvand =

Iranian Paralympic athlete (born 1985)

Personal information
- Nationality: Iranian
- Born: 6 March 1985 (age 41)

Sport
- Sport: Para-athletics
- Disability class: F11
- Event: discus throw
Medal record
Men's para-athletics
Representing Iran
Paralympic Games
Silver medal – second place	2024 Paris	Discus throw F11
World Championships
Gold medal – first place	2025 New Delhi	Discus throw F11
Asian Para Games
Silver medal – second place	2026 Aichi–Nagoya	Discus throw F11
Bronze medal – third place	2022 Hangzhou	Discus throw F11

Hassan Bajoulvand (born 6 March 1985) is an Iranian para-athlete specializing in discus throw. He represented Iran at the 2024 Summer Paralympics.

== Career ==
Bajoulvand competed at the 2022 Asian Para Games and won a bronze medal in the discus throw F11 event with a throw of 37.62 metres.

He represented Iran at the 2024 Summer Paralympics, and won a silver medal in the discus throw F11 event with a personal best throw of 41.75 metres.

In October 2026, he competed at the 2026 Asian Para Games and won a silver medal in the discus throw F11 event with a throw of 40.43 metres.
