= 2024 Summer Paralympics medal table =

List of medals won by Paralympic delegations

2024 Summer Paralympics medals
- Location: Paris, France

Highlights
- Most gold medals: China (94)
- Most total medals: China (220)
- Medalling NPCs: 85

The medal table of the 2024 Summer Paralympics ranks the participating National Paralympic Committees (NPCs) by the number of gold medals that were won by their athletes during the competition. The 2024 Paralympics was the seventeenth Games to be held, a quadrennial competition open to athletes with physical and intellectual disabilities. The games were held in Paris, France from 28 August to 8 September 2024. There were 549 medal events.

Mauritius, Nepal and the Refugee Paralympic Team won their first Paralympic medals. As of 2024, Nepal has not yet won an Olympic medal.

Judo, table tennis and taekwondo awarded two bronze medals per discipline - the table tennis to losing semi-finalists, and the two combat sports by a repechage system whereby defeated athletes up to the semi-final stage rejoin competition for a bronze medal.

== Medals ==
Paris 2024 president Tony Estanguet unveiled the Olympic and Paralympic medals for the Games in February 2024, which on the obverse featured embedded hexagon-shaped tokens of scrap iron that had been taken from the original construction of the Eiffel Tower, with the Games logo engraved into it. Approximately 5,084 medals would be produced by the French mint Monnaie de Paris, and were designed by Chaumet, a luxury jewellery firm based in Paris.

The reverse of the medals contains a design of the Eiffel Tower viewed from below, inscriptions in braille (a writing system whose development has been credited to French educator and inventor Louis Braille), and line patterns that can be used to identify the medals by touch. Each medal weighs 455–529 g (16–19 oz), has a diameter of 85 mm (3.3 in) and is 9.2 mm (0.36 in) thick. The gold medals are made with 98.8 percent silver and 1.13 percent gold, while the bronze medals are made up with copper, zinc, and tin.

== Medal table ==
Two silver medals were awarded for a second-place tie in the Men's 50m Freestyle - S11, and no bronze medal was awarded. Two bronze medals were awarded for a third-place tie in the Men's High Jump - T64. After an incident during the final race, two bronze medals were also awarded in athletics for the women's T63 100m sprint.

Key

* Host nation (France)

2024 Summer Paralympics medal table (Note: Although the IPC does not include Neutral Paralympic Athletes in the official medal tables, they are listed here for comparison purposes only.)
Rank	NPC	Gold	Silver	Bronze	Total
1	China	94	76	50	220
2	Great Britain	49	44	31	124
3	United States	36	42	27	105
4	Netherlands	27	17	12	56
–	Neutral Paralympic Athletes	26	22	23	71
5	Brazil	25	25	38	88
6	Italy	24	15	33	72
7	Ukraine	22	28	32	82
8	France*	19	28	28	75
9	Australia	18	17	27	62
10	Japan	14	10	17	41
11	Germany	10	15	24	49
12	Canada	10	9	10	29
13	Uzbekistan	10	9	7	26
14	Iran	8	10	7	25
15	Switzerland	8	8	5	21
16	Poland	8	6	9	23
17	Spain	7	11	22	40
18	India	7	9	13	29
19	Colombia	7	7	14	28
20	Belgium	7	4	3	14
21	Thailand	6	11	13	30
22	South Korea	6	10	14	30
23	Turkey	6	10	12	28
24	Cuba	6	3	1	10
25	Algeria	6	0	5	11
26	Hungary	5	6	4	15
27	Tunisia	5	3	3	11
28	Azerbaijan	4	2	5	11
29	Israel	4	2	4	10
30	Mexico	3	6	8	17
31	Morocco	3	6	6	15
32	Hong Kong	3	4	1	8
33	Greece	3	3	7	13
34	Venezuela	3	2	1	6
35	Slovakia	3	2	0	5
36	Latvia	3	1	0	4
37	Argentina	2	3	8	13
38	Denmark	2	3	5	10
39	Kazakhstan	2	3	4	9
40	Nigeria	2	3	2	7
41	Egypt	2	2	3	7
42	Malaysia	2	2	1	5
43	Portugal	2	1	5	8
44	Ethiopia	2	1	0	3
44	Singapore	2	1	0	3
46	South Africa	2	0	4	6
47	Ecuador	2	0	2	4
48	Jordan	2	0	1	3
49	Costa Rica	2	0	0	2
50	Indonesia	1	8	5	14
51	Georgia	1	4	4	9
51	New Zealand	1	4	4	9
53	Czech Republic	1	4	3	8
54	Norway	1	3	3	7
55	Ireland	1	3	2	6
55	Serbia	1	3	2	6
57	Mongolia	1	3	0	4
58	Iraq	1	1	3	5
59	Croatia	1	1	2	4
60	Chile	1	0	5	6
61	Kuwait	1	0	1	2
61	Namibia	1	0	1	2
61	Romania	1	0	1	2
61	Slovenia	1	0	1	2
65	Bulgaria	1	0	0	1
65	Peru	1	0	0	1
65	Saudi Arabia	1	0	0	1
68	Chinese Taipei	0	3	2	5
69	Austria	0	3	1	4
70	Bosnia and Herzegovina	0	2	0	2
71	Finland	0	1	3	4
72	Sweden	0	1	2	3
73	Cyprus	0	1	1	2
73	Moldova	0	1	1	2
75	Kenya	0	1	0	1
75	Sri Lanka	0	1	0	1
75	Trinidad and Tobago	0	1	0	1
78	Refugee Paralympic Team	0	0	2	2
79	Lithuania	0	0	1	1
79	Luxembourg	0	0	1	1
79	Mauritius	0	0	1	1
79	Montenegro	0	0	1	1
79	Nepal	0	0	1	1
79	Pakistan	0	0	1	1
79	Vietnam	0	0	1	1
Totals (85 entries)		549	551	607	1,707

== Podium sweeps ==
A podium sweep is where a team or nation comes in first, second and third, and wins all available medals.

Date	Sport	Event	Team	Gold	Silver	Bronze	Ref
3 September	Swimming	Men's 50 metre backstroke S5	China	Yuan Weiyi	Guo Jincheng	Wang Lichao	
3 September	Swimming	Women's 50 metre backstroke S5	China	Lu Dong	He Shenggao	Liu Yu	
5 September	Swimming	Men's 50 metre freestyle S5	China	Guo Jincheng	Yuan Weiyi	Wang Lichao	
6 September	Swimming	Men's 50 metre butterfly S5	China	Guo Jincheng	Yuan Weiyi	Wang Lichao	
6 September	Athletics	Women's 100 metre T64	Netherlands	Fleur Jong	Kimberly Alkemade	Marlene van Gansewinkel	

== Neutral Paralympic Athletes ==
Neutral Paralympic Athletes was the name used to represent approved Russian and Belarusian athletes at the 2024 Summer Paralympics, after the International Paralympic Committee (IPC) banned the nations' previous designations due to the Russian invasion of Ukraine in 2022.

Neutral athletes competed under a white flag featuring black lettering spelling out NPA. The flag’s use was limited to TV and sports presentation graphics and during medal ceremonies. Medal wins were not recorded on the Paris 2024 Paralympic Games medals table and when a neutral athlete won a gold medal, the Paralympic anthem was played, but their medal was not added to the official medals table.

== See also ==
- All-time Paralympic Games medal table
- 2024 Summer Olympics medal table
