= Trinidad and Tobago at the 2024 Summer Paralympics =

- IPC code: TRI

in Paris, France August 28, 2024 – September 8, 2024
- Competitors: 1 in 1 sport
- Flag bearer: Akeem Stewart
- Medals Ranked 75th: Gold 0 Silver 1 Bronze 0 Total 1

Summer Paralympics appearances (overview)
- 1984; 1988; 1992–2008; 2012; 2016; 2020; 2024

Trinidad and Tobago competed at the 2024 Summer Paralympics in Paris, France, from 28 August to 8 September 2024. This was the nation's fifth time competing at the Summer Paralympic Games after it made its debut at the 1984 Summer Paralympics. The delegation consisted of only one competitor from one sport.

== Medalists ==
Medal	Name	Sport	Event	Date
Silver	Akeem Stewart	Athletics	Men's discus throw F64	2 September

=== Medals by sport ===
Medals by sport
Sport	1st place, gold medalist(s)	2nd place, silver medalist(s)	3rd place, bronze medalist(s)	Total
Athletics	0	1	0	1
Total	0	1	0	1

=== Medals by gender ===
Medals by gender
Gender	1st place, gold medalist(s)	2nd place, silver medalist(s)	3rd place, bronze medalist(s)	Total
Female	0	0	0	0
Male	0	1	0	1
Mixed	0	0	0	0
Total	0	1	0	1

=== Medals by date ===
Medals by date
Date	1st place, gold medalist(s)	2nd place, silver medalist(s)	3rd place, bronze medalist(s)	Total
5 September	0	1	0	1
Total	0	1	0	1

== Competitors ==
The following is the list of number of competitors in the Games.

Sport	Men	Women	Total
Athletics	1	0	1
Total	1	0	1

== Athletics ==
Athlete	Event	Final	
Athlete	Event	Result	Rank
Akeem Stewart	Men's discus throw F64	59.66 SB	2nd place, silver medalist(s)

== See also ==
- Trinidad and Tobago at the 2024 Summer Olympics
- Trinidad and Tobago at the Paralympics
