= Mahmoud Rajab =

Libyan para athlete

Personal information
- Born: 10 October 1985 (age 40)

Sport
- Sport: Para-athletics
- Disability class: F57
- Event: Discus throw
Medal record
Men's para-athletics
Representing Libya
World Championships
Gold medal – first place	2025 New Delhi	Discus throw F57
Islamic Solidarity Games
Gold medal – first place	2025 Riyadh	Discus Throw F57

Mahmoud Rajab (born 10 October 1985) is a Libyan para discus thrower who competes in F57 category.

== Career ==
Rajab represented Libya at the 2025 World Para Athletics Championships and won the gold medal in the discus throw event. This was Libya's first gold medal at the World Para Athletics Championships.
