= Trinidad and Tobago at the Paralympics =

- IPC code: TRI
- Medals: Gold 3 Silver 2 Bronze 2 Total 7

Summer appearances
- 1984; 1988; 1992–2008; 2012; 2016; 2020; 2024

Trinidad and Tobago made its Paralympic Games début at the 1984 Summer Paralympics in Stoke Mandeville and New York. For its first participation, the country sent eight athletes (seven men and one woman) to compete in athletics, swimming and weightlifting. Its three medals (two gold and a bronze) were all won by the same athlete, Rachael Marshall. The country competed again in the 1988 Summer Games, with a reduced delegation of four athletes (all men), in athletics, table tennis and weightlifting. They won no medals. Trinidad and Tobago returned to the Paralympics in 2012, and has never participated in the Winter Paralympics.

The country's three medals (of which two gold) place it 72nd on the all-time Paralympic Games medal table.

== Medal tallies ==
=== Summer Paralympics ===
Event	Gold	Silver	Bronze	Total	Ranking
1984 Summer Paralympics	2	0	1	3	29th
1988 Summer Paralympics	0	0	0	0	—
1992 Summer Paralympics	Did Not Participate				
1996 Summer Paralympics	Did Not Participate				
2000 Summer Paralympics	Did Not Participate				
2004 Summer Paralympics	Did Not Participate				
2008 Summer Paralympics	Did Not Participate				
2012 Summer Paralympics	0	0	0	0	—
2016 Summer Paralympics	1	1	1	3	56th
2020 Summer Paralympics	Did not participate				
2024 Summer Paralympics	0	1	0	1	75th
Total	3	2	2	7	

== Medallists ==
Medal	Name	Games	Sport	Event
Gold	Rachael Marshall	1984 Stoke Mandeville / New York	Athletics	Women's javelin throw L5
Gold	Rachael Marshall	1984 Stoke Mandeville / New York	Athletics	Women's shot put L5
Bronze	Rachael Marshall	1984 Stoke Mandeville / New York	Swimming	Women's 100 metre freestyle L6
Gold	Akeem Stewart	2016 Rio de Janeiro	Athletics	Men's javelin throw F42-44
Silver	Akeem Stewart	2016 Rio de Janeiro	Athletics	Men's discus throw F43-44
Bronze	Nyoshia Cain	2016 Rio de Janeiro	Athletics	Women's 100m T43-44

== See also ==
- Trinidad and Tobago at the Olympics
