= Konstantinos Tzounis =

Greek paralympic athlete

Personal information
- Born: 4 May 1991 (age 35)

Sport
- Country: Greece
- Sport: Para-athletics
- Disability class: F56
Medal record
Para-athletics
Representing Greece
Paralympic Games
Bronze medal – third place	2024 Paris	Discus throw F56
World Championships
Gold medal – first place	2021 Bydgoszcz	Discus throw F56
Bronze medal – third place	2025 New Delhi	Discus throw F56

Konstantinos Tzounis (born 4 May 1991) is a Greek para-athlete specializing in discus throw. He competed at the 2024 Summer Paralympics, winning the bronze medal in the men's discus throw F56 event.
