= Kair, Delhi =

Coordinates: 28.6239°N 76.9183°E

Kair
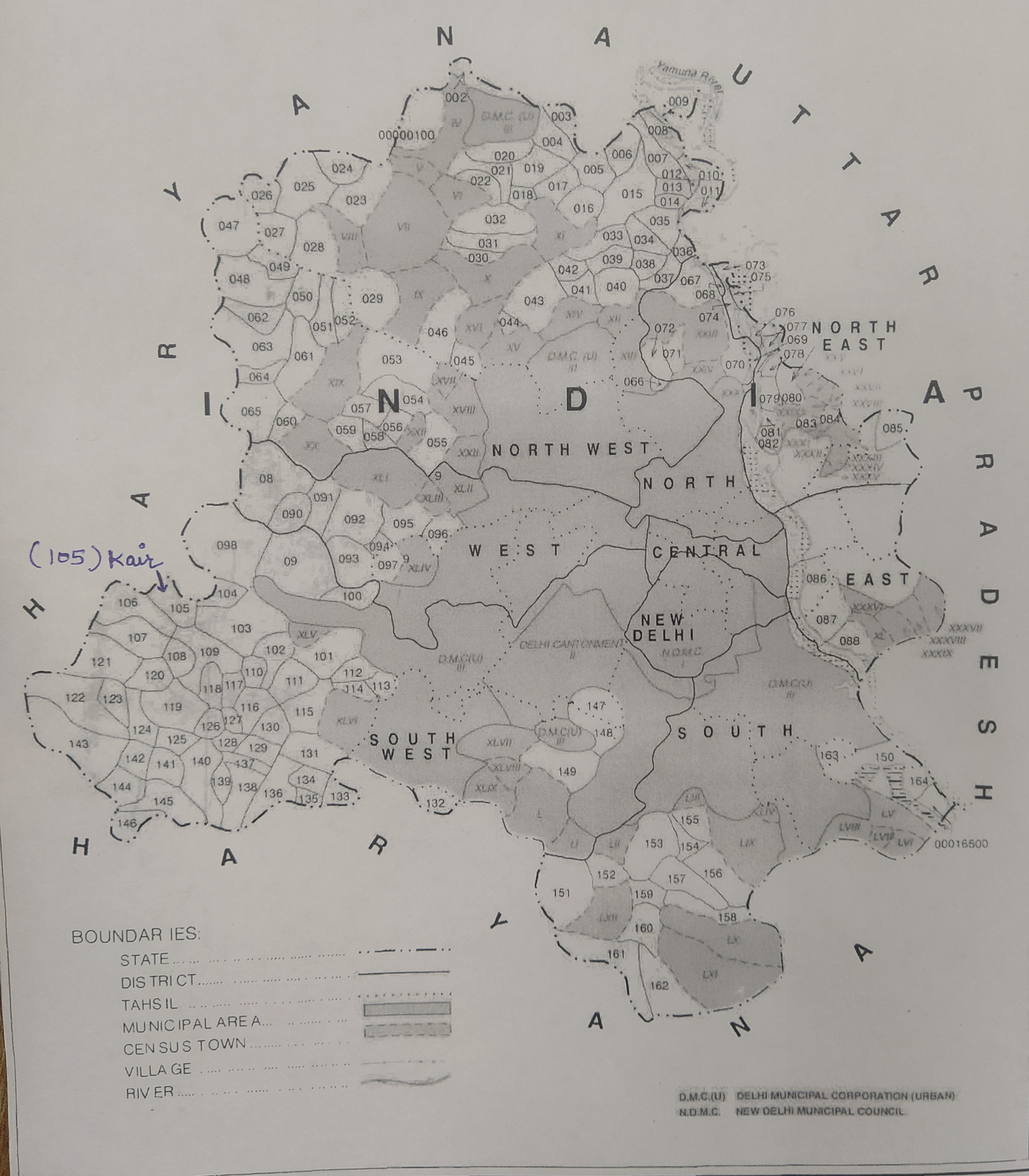
- Village
- Interactive map of Kair
- Country: India
- State: New Delhi
- District: South west District
- Incorporated: A Mughal Era Village
- Founded by: Dada Jakhde (Gram Devta)

Government
  - Police Station: Jaffar Pur Kalan Village Police Station (Dwarka District) (Ph No. 011-5318500)
  - ACP Sub Division: ACP Sub Division Office, Najafgarh
  - Member of Parliament: Shri Parvesh Sahib Singh Verma
  - Member of Legislative Assembly-35 AC: Smt Neelam Krishan Pehalwan
  - Municipal Councilor- Ward 127: Smt. Meena Devi
- Elevation: 214 m (702 ft)

Population (2011)
  - Total: 4,074
- Time zone: UTC+5:30 (IST)
- PIN: 110043
- Telephone Code: 011- xxx xxx
- Nearest Village Sharing Boundary with Kair: Mitraon, Mundhela Khurd, Surkhpur, Surehra
- Lok Sabha constituency: West Delhi Constituency
- Vidhan Sabha constituency: Najafgarh
- Civic Body: MCD Ward Isapur-127
- Planning agency: DDA
- Climate: Cw (Köppen)
- Precipitation: 490.6 millimetres (19.31 in)
- Avg. summer temperature: 32.5 °C (90.5 °F)
- Avg. winter temperature: 17.6 °C (63.7 °F)

Kair is a village located in the Najafgarh area of South West Delhi. With a population of 4,074 as of Census 2011, the village is not as populated as others in the region, an area near the Delhi—Haryana border. The local language in the village is Hindi. Main Gotra of the village is "Sehrawat" or "Sahrawat", a Jat gotra. The Sehrawat who took their name from Sehra, a Son or Grandson of Raja Anagpal Tomar, appears to have come from the neighborhood of Delhi. (Source: The Tribes & Castes of the North-Western Province & Oudh by W.Crooke, B.A, Volume.III, Book Publication Year:1896, page 33)

== Origin of the word Kair ==
"Kair" is the name of the plant which is known as "Capparis decidua" in scientific language. It's a useful plant in its marginal habitat. Its spicy fruits are used for preparing vegetables, curry and fine pickles and can attract helpful insectivores; the plant also is used in folk medicine and herbalism. It can be used in landscape gardening, afforestation and reforestation in semi desert and desert areas; it provides assistance against soil erosion. It is told by local people of the village that earlier this tree found in abundance every where in village but as the population increase and other development activities in village pour shadow on tree population. Now, a days the conservation status of "Kair tree" comes under "Least Concern" category of the IUCN standard and also it found scarcely in village too.

== Demographics ==
As of 2011 Indian Census, Kair has a total population of 4,074 of which 2221 are males and 1853 are females. Population within the age group of 0 to 6 years is 454. The village has a good literacy rate of over 78% in comparison to literacy rate in rural Delhi which is over 70% while Delhi has just above 75%.

== History ==
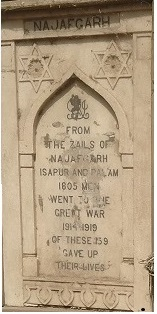
WW1 Stone; Zails of Najafgarh, Isapur & Palam

Kair is among those villages which provides large number of recruits during both the World Wars (84 recruits in first World War & 92 recruits in second World War). There are 14 men's killed during the first World War which is largest among any village in the Delhi province. Road from Mitraon to Kair and Up gradation of village only Primary school to Middle school was the reward for villagers due to its large number of recruits during both World Wars.

=== Notable Family of Kair Village ===
Subedar Kure Ram son of Ch. Ram Rattan was the first Viceroy Commissioned Officer of the Kair village who died during the British campaign of Mesopotamia in the first World War. He had two highly successful sons. The elder son Chaudhary Bhim Singh was among first graduate batch of Delhi University from St. Stephen's college in 1923, he was also a selected candidate of Punjab Civil Services (P.C.S) in 1928 and then retired from the post of Director General of Land Records, Punjab (Present day whole Punjab, Haryana and Himachal Pradesh) in 1959. The younger son Chaudhary Sher Singh Sehrawat, BA was also a Delhi University graduate during the British period and worked for the Govt. of India.

The sons of Chaudhary Bhim Singh, BA, L.LB, the eldest son Lt. Colonel Umrao Singh, BA, L.LB was a first direct Indian Commissioned Officer of the Indian Army from the village in 1948. His wife, Smt. Braham Kaur, a daughter of the Captain Amin Lal M.C Bahadur of Village Baland, he was a Military Cross recipient in first World War and also dies as a centenarian in 1978 with a record of taking pension for longest period in Haryana. The younger son Ch. Dil Bagh Singh, B.A, L.LB was a Lawyer in Delhi.

Also the sons of Chaudhary Sher Singh, Ch. O. J. Singh Sehrawat (Masters in History from University of Delhi) and Ch. Rajender Singh Sehrawat worked for the Govt. of India. The daughter of Ch. O. J. Singh Sehrawat namely, Dr. Seema Sehrawat is a PhD from the prestigious Indian Institute of Science, Bangalore. Currently placed at United States, she is a famous research scientist of global repute and has worked at the prestigious Harvard Medical School for 10 years. The son of Ch. O. J. Singh Sehrawat namely Ashish Sehrawat is a physicist of international repute and has studied at Indian Institute of Technology, Indore.

== Facilities ==
The village is home to the Bhagini Nivedita College, affiliated with Delhi University. Established in 1993, the university is named after Sister Nivedita, a disciple of Swami Vivekananda. Nearest Government Hospital to the village is Rao Tula Ram Memorial Hospital. It has three private schools and three Government school for education of children.

=== Sports ===
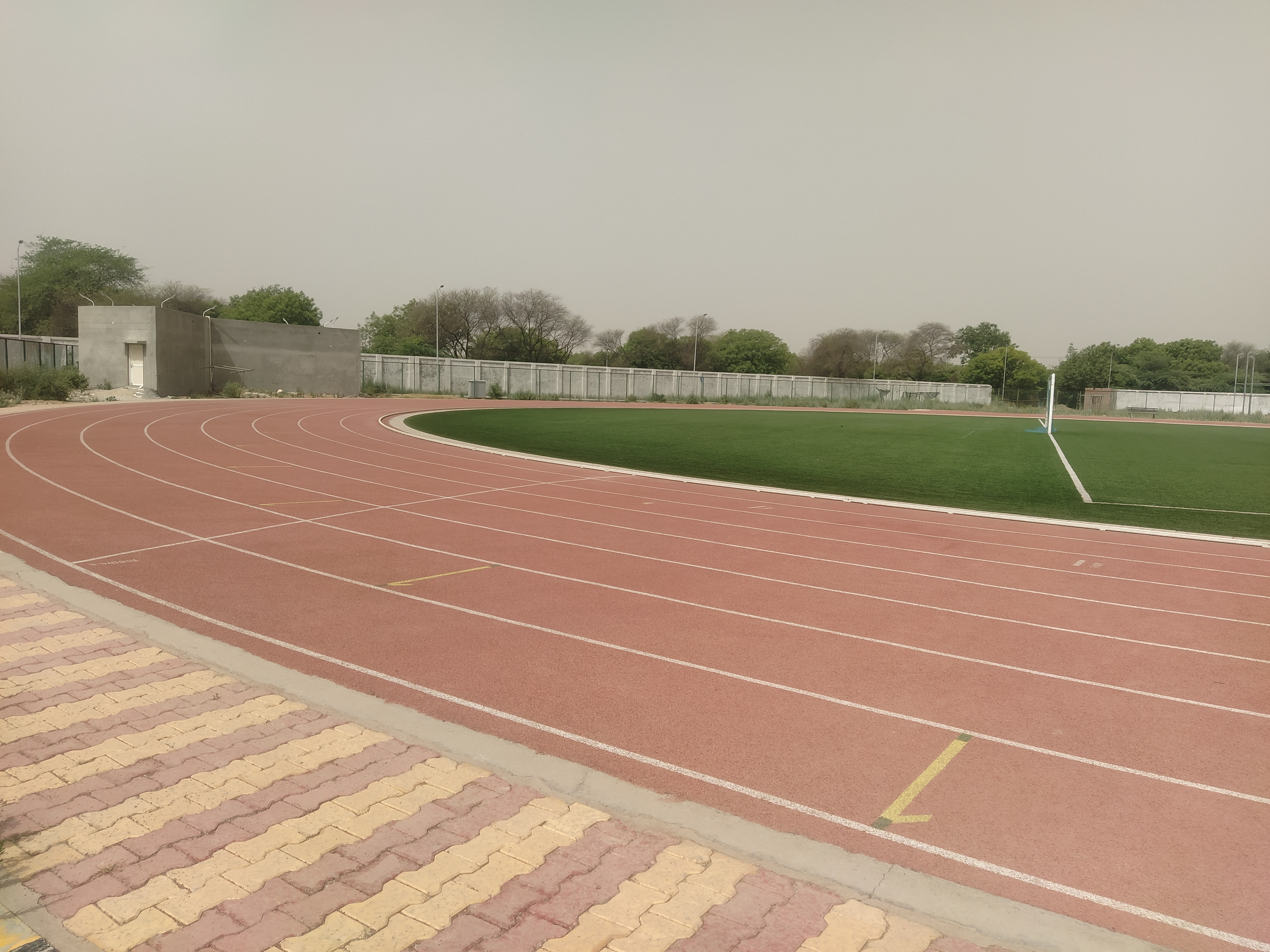
Blessing for Villagers to have an International Standard Stadium in village

Government established Mange Ram Pehlwan Vyamshala is also situated in the Kair village. It is a hub for varied local sports events and tournaments. It also has an upcoming International Standard stadium for multiple sports events.Gian Singh Sehrawat of village is an Olympian and he was participated in Los Angeles Olympics games, 1984.

=== Transport ===
Village is very well connected to all places with concrete road and this village also have a Cluster Bus Depot. Nearest railway station to the village is Bahadurgarh Railway Station about 11.7 km and nearest Airport to the village is Indira Gandhi International Airport nearly 26 km from the village. Kair village also witnessed an Air ambulance crash in May, 2016.

==== Bank & Post Office ====
Village has one private bank federal Bank Ltd and also has a Post office.

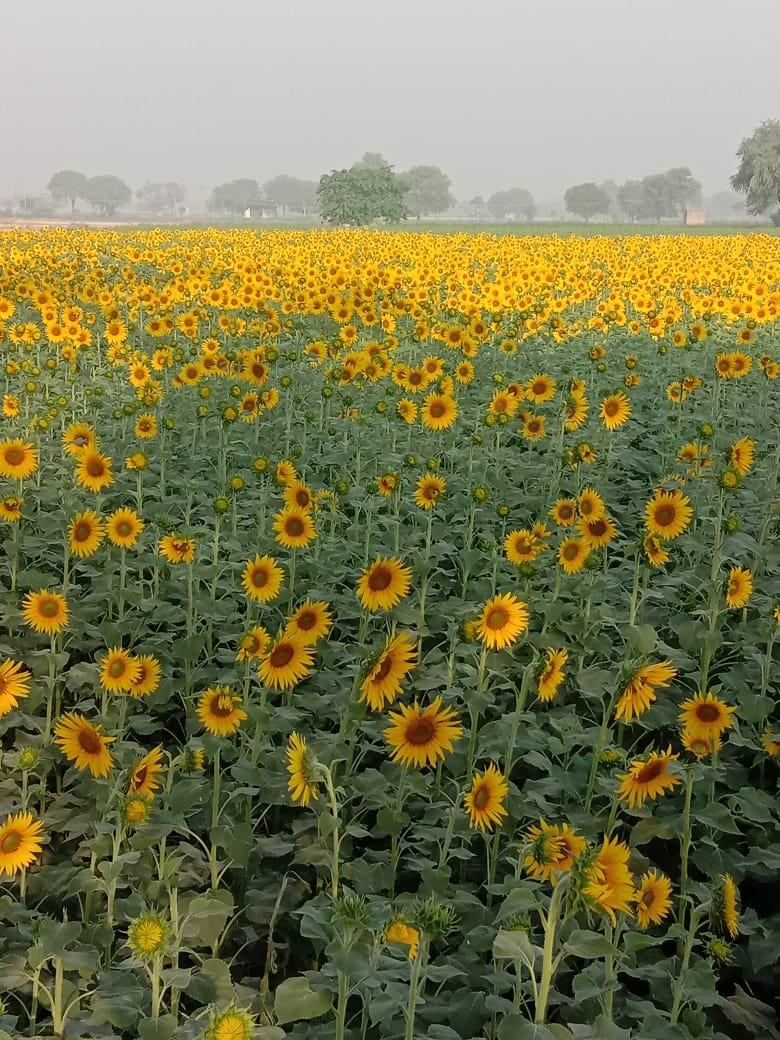
Sunflower Blooms in village

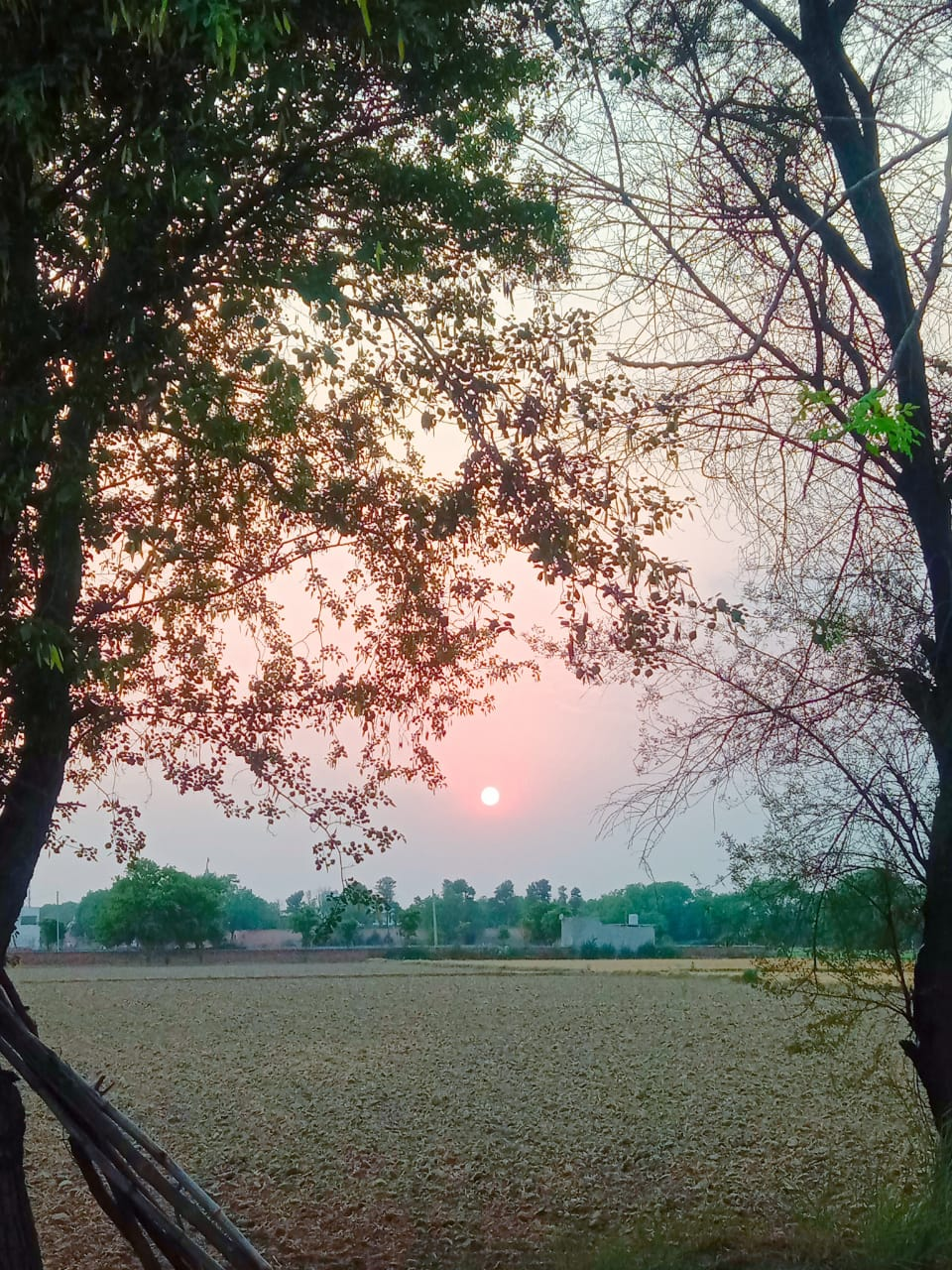
Pristine Sunset view from the village

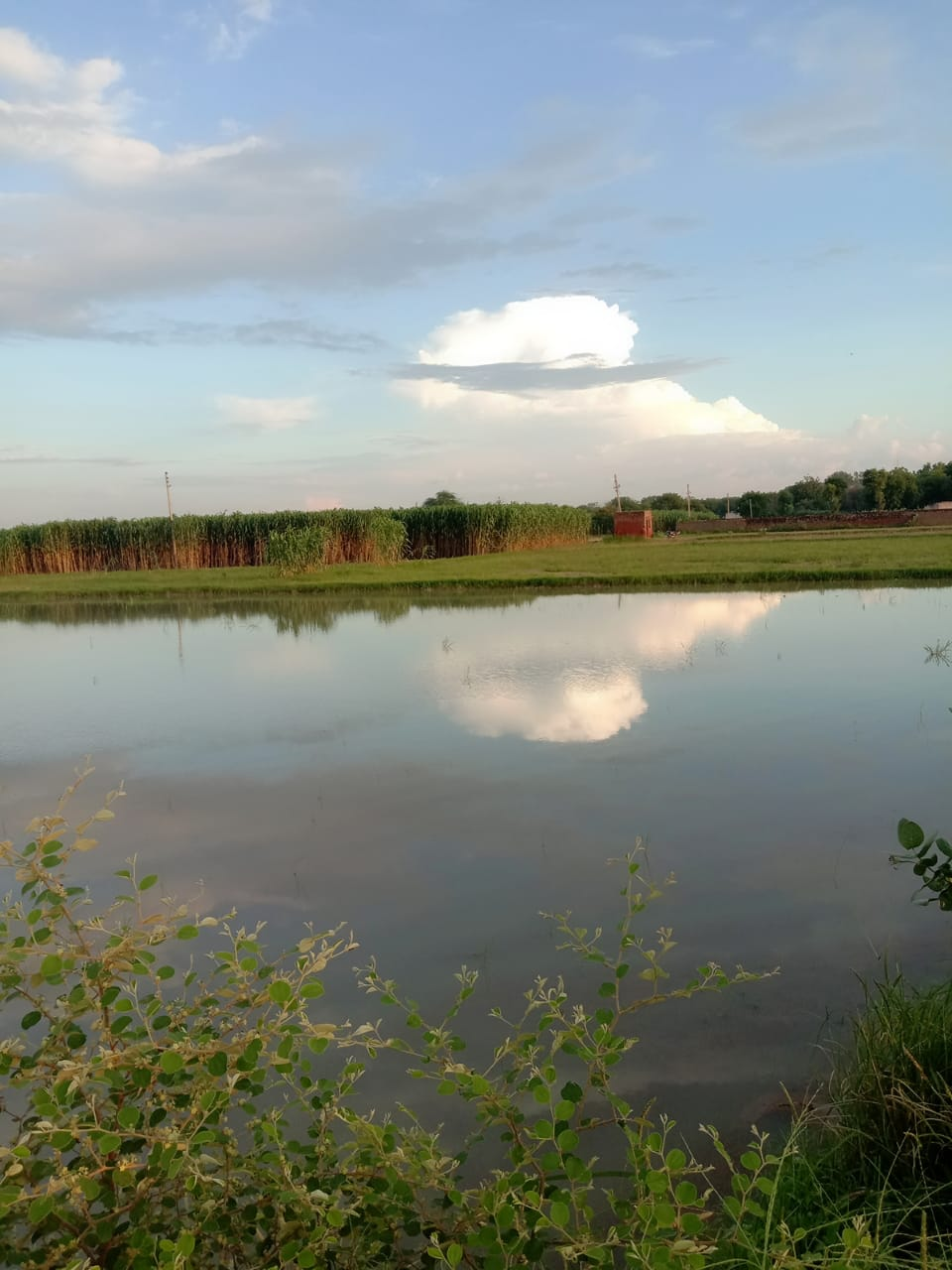
Immaculate Village scene
