= Álvaro del Amo Cano =

Spanish Paralympic athlete (born 1990)

Personal information
- Nationality: Spanish
- Born: 20 January 1990 (age 36)

Sport
- Sport: Para-athletics
- Disability class: F11
- Events: shot put discus throw
Medal record
Men's para-athletics
Representing Spain
Paralympic Games
| Bronze medal – third place | 2024 Paris | Shot put F11 |
| Bronze medal – third place | 2024 Paris | Discus throw F11 |
World Championships
| Bronze medal – third place | 2023 Paris | Shot put F11 |
| Bronze medal – third place | 2023 Paris | Discus throw F11 |
| Bronze medal – third place | 2025 New Delhi | Shot put F11 |
| Bronze medal – third place | 2025 New Delhi | Discus throw F11 |

Álvaro del Amo Cano (born 20 January 1990) is a Spanish para-athlete specializing in throwing events: shot put and discus throw.

== Career ==
He represented Spain at the 2023 World Para Athletics Championships and won bronze medals in the discus throw and shot put events.

He represented Spain at the 2024 Summer Paralympics and won a bronze medal in the shot put and discus throw F11 events.
