= Jesse Zesseu =

Canadian para athletics competitor (born 1999)

- Zesseu in 2026

Personal information
- Full name: Jesse Tankwa Zesseu
- Nationality: Canadian
- Born: June 27, 1999 (age 27)
- Home town: Etobicoke, Ontario, Canada
- Height: 183 cm (6 ft 0 in)
- Weight: 180 lb (82 kg)

Sport
- Country: Canada
- Sport: Para athletics
- Disability class: F37
- Events: Discus throw, Long jump
- Club: Royal City Athletics Club
- Coached by: Paul Galas
Medal record
Men's para athletics
Representing Canada
Paralympic Games
Silver medal – second place	2024 Paris	Discus throw F37
Parapan American Games
Silver medal – second place	2023 Santiago	Discus throw F37
Bronze medal – third place	2023 Santiago	Long jump T37/38

Jesse Zesseu (born June 27, 1999) is a Canadian para-athlete specializing in discus throw and long jump.

== Early life ==
Zesseu attended Bishop Allen Academy and then earned a Bachelor of Arts degree in political science from the University of Guelph.

== Career ==
Zesseu competed at the 2023 World Para Athletics Championships in the discus throw and long jump T37 events.

Zesseu represented Canada at the 2024 Summer Paralympics and won a silver medal in the discus throw F37 event.
