= Paralympic medal table =

Paralympic medal table may refer to:

- the All-time Paralympic Games medal table
- an explanation as to how medal tables are sorted during the Paralympic Games. If so, see the article "Olympic medal table", which also applies to the Paralympics.
