= Harrison Walsh =

Welsh para discus thrower

Personal information
- Born: 4 March 1996 (age 30)

Sport
- Country: United Kingdom; Wales
- Sport: Discus throw
Medal record
Discus throw
Representing United Kingdom
World Championships
Bronze medal – third place	2024 Kobe	Discus throw F64
European Championships
Bronze medal – third place	2021 Bydgoszcz	Discus throw F64
Representing Wales
Commonwealth Games
Bronze medal – third place	2022 Birmingham	Discus throw (F44)/(F64)

Harrison Walsh (born 4 March 1996) is a Welsh para discus thrower.

== Career ==
Walsh competed at the 2022 Commonwealth Games in the athletics competition, being awarded the bronze medal in the men's discus throw (F44)/(F64) event.

Walsh took up discus after a knee injury ended his career as a rugby player at the age of 18. He was due to participate at the 2020 Summer Paralympics in the men's discus event but was unable to start because of an ankle injury.

At the 2024 World Para Athletics Championships Walsh won a bronze medal in the F64 discus throw.

In his Paralympics debut, at the 2024 Summer Paralympics, Walsh came 7th in the F64 Discus Throw.
