= Athletics at the 2008 Summer Paralympics – Men's long jump F37–38 =

Men's Long Jump F37/38 at the XIII Paralympic Games
- Venue: Beijing National Stadium
- Dates: 9 September
- Competitors: 13 from 11 nations
- Winning distance: 6.44

Medalists
1st place, gold medalist(s)		Farhat Chida	Tunisia
2nd place, silver medalist(s)		Haider Ali	Pakistan
3rd place, bronze medalist(s)		Ma Yuxi	China

The men's long jump F37/38 event at the 2008 Summer Paralympics took place at the Beijing National Stadium at 18:33 on 9 September. There was a single round of competition; after the first three jumps, only the top eight had 3 further jumps. The competition was won by Farhat Chida, representing Tunisia.

== Results ==
Rank	Athlete	Nationality	Cl.	1	2	3	4	5	6	Best	Pts.	Notes
1st place, gold medalist(s)	Farhat Chida	Tunisia	F38	6.29	6.36	5.98	6.11	6.44	6.40	6.44	1104	WR
2nd place, silver medalist(s)	Haider Ali	Pakistan	F38	6.23	x	6.36	6.13	x	6.44	6.44	1104	=WR
3rd place, bronze medalist(s)	Ma Yuxi	China	F37	6.12	x	6.06	5.81	x	6.19	6.19	1076	WR
4	Aristotelis Marinos	Greece	F38	5.67	5.46	x	5.58	5.84	5.95	5.95	1020	SB
5	Darren Thrupp	Australia	F37	x	5.76	5.82	5.57	x	x	5.82	1011	SB
6	Fares Hamdi	Tunisia	F37	5.64	5.77	5.60	5.57	5.42	5.19	5.77	1003	SB
7	Baldur Baldursson	Iceland	F37	5.42	5.22	5.39	5.29	5.31	x	5.42	942	SB
8	Lukasz Labuch	Poland	F37	5.42	5.20	x	x	x	5.12	5.42	942	
9	Vladislav Barinov	Russia	F37	5.36	x	5.29	-	-	-	5.36	931	
10	Jiri Kohout	Czech Republic	F37	x	5.22	5.19	-	-	-	5.22	907	SB
11	Benjamin Cardozo	Mexico	F37	x	x	5.17	-	-	-	5.17	898	
12	Mvstapha Moussaoui	Algeria	F37	x	4.74	4.81	-	-	-	4.81	836	
13	Jan Vlk	Czech Republic	F37	4.38	x	4.56	-	-	-	4.56	792	

WR = World Record. SB = Seasonal Best. Gold medal decided by second-best jumps (IAAF rule 180.19).
