= André Rocha (athlete) =

Brazilian Paralympic athlete (born 1977)

Personal information
- Full name: André Luis da Rocha Antunes
- Born: 15 April 1977 (age 49) Taubaté, São Paulo, Brazil

Sport
- Sport: Para-athletics
- Disability class: F52
- Event(s): discus throw shot put
Medal record
Men's para-athletics
Representing Brazil
Paralympic Games
Bronze medal – third place	2024 Paris	Discus throw F52
World Championships
Gold medal – first place	2024 Kobe	Discus throw F52
Silver medal – second place	2025 New Delhi	Discus throw F52

André Luis da Rocha Antunes (born 15 April 1977) is a Brazilian para-athlete specializing in throwing events: discus throw and shot put. He represented Brazil at the 2024 Summer Paralympics.

== Career ==
In 2018, Rocha set a world record in the shot put F53 category with a throw of 8.73 metres.

Rocha represented Brazil at the 2024 World Para Athletics Championships and won a gold medal in the discus throw F52 event. As a result, he qualified for the 2024 Summer Paralympics. At the 2024 Summer Paralympics, he won a bronze medal in the discus throw F52 event.
