= National Paralympic Committee of Pakistan =

Sports oversight body

National Paralympic Committee
- Country: Pakistan
- Code: PAK
- Created: 1998
- Recognized: International Paralympic Committee (IPC)
- Continental association: APC
- Headquarters: Islamabad
- President: Tariq Mustafa
- Secretary General: Imran Jamil Shami
- Website: pakistanparalympic.org

The National Paralympic Committee of Pakistan is the primary body in Pakistan for the promotion of sports for disabled people. The key focus of the committee is to organise, supervise and co-ordinate games and competitions for disabled people.

The organisation is also the body responsible for selecting athletes to represent Pakistan at the Paralympic Games and other international athletic meets and for managing the Pakistani teams at these events.

Dr. Tariq Mustafa is the current president of the organisation, while Imran Jamil Shami is the general secretary.

== History ==
The National Paralympic Committee of Pakistan was established in December 1998 duly recognized by the Government of Pakistan as the sole body with the mandate to represent Pakistan at the International Paralympic Committee and Asian Paralympic Committee, and to oversee and manage sports for disabled people in Pakistan. It is affiliated with the International Paralympic Committee (IPC), the Asian Paralympic Committee (APC), International Paralympic Sports Federations (IPSFs), International Organizations for Sports for the Disabled (IOSDs) and Regional Sports Organizations of Asia.

== Affiliations ==
- International Paralympic Committee
- Asian Paralympic Committee

== Aims ==
The vision of the National Paralympic Committee of Pakistan is as follows: "To enable the disabled population of Pakistan to become booming members of the Paralympic Movement by achieving sporting excellence and proving their worth.” Its motto, "Equality – Excellence – Trancendence" reflects this.

== Logo design ==
The NPC logo showcases a human symbol in a posture that denotes movement, spirit and motion. The rising movement denotes the soaring spirit of sports, competition and victory. The accompanying flag of Pakistan makes it obvious that this is a national movement for Pakistan and evokes an image of the athlete raising the flag of his country. The text encircles the image, thus denoting the mandate of the National Paralympics Committee Pakistan. The IPC logo at the bottom signifies the association of NPC, Pakistan with International Paralympic Committee.

== See also ==
- Pakistan at the Paralympics
- Special Olympics Pakistan
