= 2024 Blind T20 World Cup =

Game season

- Dates: 23 November 2024 – 3 December 2024
- Administrator: World Blind Cricket Council
- Cricket format: T20 International
- Tournament format(s): Group and Knockout
- Host: Pakistan
- Champions: Pakistan (1st title)
- Runners-up: Bangladesh
- Participants: 7

The 2024 Blind World T20 also known as 2024 Blind T20 World Cup was a T20I tournament which was also the fourth edition of the Blind T20 World Cup for blind cricketers, held in Pakistan from 23 November to 3 December.

India were the defending champions of Blind T20 World Cup. The Indian cricket team has pulled out of the Blind T20 World Cup.

The tournament features seven teams: Nepal, India, Afghanistan, Pakistan, Bangladesh, Sri Lanka, and South Africa.

== Squads ==
All the squads for the 2024 Blind T20 World Cup were announced by the respective blind cricket associations.

CABN-Nepal
No.	Name	Cricket Position
B1 Category (Totally Blind)
16	(Nepal) Ramesh Bahadur Bania (B2) (C)	All Rounder
6	(Nepal) Sunil Chhetri (B1)	Batter
21	(Nepal) Sagar Lama (B1)	Batter
1	(Nepal) Prem Chhetri (B1)	All Rounder
9	(Nepal) Durgadatta Paudel (B1)	All Rounder
19	(Nepal) Nischal Siwakoti (B1)	NA
B2 Category (Partially Blind)
7	(Nepal) Sunil Magar (B2)	All Rounder
3	(Nepal) Shanta Bahadur (B2)	Bowler
10	(Nepal) Prabin Syangtan (B2)	All Rounder
7	(Nepal) Padam Karki (B2)	NA
20	(Nepal) Madan Neupane (B2)	NA
11	(Nepal) Bharat Thapa (B2)	All Rounder
B3 Category (Partially Sighted)
4	(Nepal) Padam Badaila (B3)	All Rounder
79	(Nepal) Naresh Chaudhary (B3)	All Rounder
12	(Nepal) Amish Guragain (B3)	All Rounder
Head coach		(Nepal) Arun Kumar Aryal

CABI-India
No.	Name	Cricket Position
B1 Category (Totally Blind)
11	(India) Ajay Kumar Reddy (B1) (C)	All Rounder
2	(India) Debaraj Behera (B1)	All Rounder
5	(India) Nareshbhai Balubhai Tumda (B1)	Batter
8	(India) Nilesh Yadav (B1)	All Rounder
14	(India) Sanjay Kumar Shah (B1)	Bowler
22	(India) Praveen Kumar Sharma (B1)	All Rounder
B2 Category (Partially Blind)
7	(India) Venkateswara Rao Dunna (B2)	All Rounder
1	(India) Pankaj Bhue (B2)	All Rounder
3	(India) Lokesha (B2)	Batter
9	(India) Rambir Singh (B2)	All Rounder
10	(India) Irfan Diwan (B2)	Bowler
B3 Category (Partially Sighted)
18	(India) Durga Rao Tompaki (B3) (VC)	All Rounder
17	(India) Sunil Ramesh (B3)	Batter
6	(India) Sukhram Majhi (B3)	All Rounder
4	(India) Ravi Amiti (B3)	Bowler
13	(India) Dineshbhai Chamaydabhai Rathva (B3)	All Rounder
15	(India) Dhinagar Gopu (B3)	All Rounder
Head coach		(India) Asif Vali

PBCC-Pakistan
No.	Name	Cricket Position
B1 Category (Totally Blind)
—	(Pakistan) Zafar Iqbal (B1)	All Rounder
—	(Pakistan) Muhammad Idrees Saleem (B1)	Batter
—	(Pakistan) Muhammad Shahzaib (B1)	Batter
—	(Pakistan) Fakhar Abbas (B1)	All Rounder
—	(Pakistan) Muhammad Asif (B1)	Bowler
—	(Pakistan) Muhammad Salman (B1)	All Rounder
B2 Category (Partially Blind)
—	(Pakistan) Nisar Ali (B2) (C)	Batter
—	(Pakistan) Badar Munir (B2) (VC)	Wicket-keeper
—	(Pakistan) Babar Ali (B2)	All Rounder
—	(Pakistan) Nematullah (B2)	Bowler
—	(Pakistan) Haroon Khan (B2)	All Rounder
B3 Category (Partially Sighted)
—	(Pakistan) Muhammad Safdar (B3)	All Rounder
—	(Pakistan) Kamran Akhtar (B3)	Bowler
—	(Pakistan) Akmal Hayat Nasir (B3)	All Rounder
—	(Pakistan) Talha Iqbal (B3)	Batter
—	(Pakistan) Matiullah (B3)	All Rounder
Head coach		(Pakistan) Muhammad Jameel

SLCAVH-Sri Lanka
No.	Name	Cricket Position
B1 Category (Totally Blind)
—	(Sri Lanka) Priyantha Kumara (B1) (C)	All Rounder
—	(Sri Lanka) Tharindu Lakshan (B1)	Batter
—	(Sri Lanka) K.A. Silva (B1)	Bowler
—	(Sri Lanka) Sahan Kumara (B1)	All Rounder
—	(Sri Lanka) Kosala Herath (B1)	All Rounder
B2 Category (Partially Blind)
—	(Sri Lanka) Suranga Sampath (B2)	Batter
—	(Sri Lanka) Damith Sandaruwan (B2)	All Rounder
—	(Sri Lanka) Ruwan Wasantha (B2)	Bowler
—	(Sri Lanka) Chaminda Pushpakumara (B2)	All Rounder
B3 Category (Partially Sighted)
—	(Sri Lanka) Chandana Deshapriya (B3) (VC)	Batter
—	(Sri Lanka) Upul Sanjeewa (B3)	All Rounder
—	(Sri Lanka) Dimuthu Perera (B3)	Bowler
—	(Sri Lanka) Nuwan Dharmaratne (B3)	All Rounder
Head coach		(Sri Lanka) Dewapriya Lakshan

BBCC-Bangladesh
No.	Name	Cricket Position
B1 Category (Totally Blind)
—	(Bangladesh) Abid Hasan (B1)	All Rounder
—	(Bangladesh) Md Asmot Ali (B1)	Bowler
—	(Bangladesh) Sukel Tangchangya (B1)	All Rounder
—	(Bangladesh) Md Shovon (B1)	Batter
—	(Bangladesh) Al Amin (B1)	Bowler
B2 Category (Partially Blind)
—	(Bangladesh) Md Arif Hossain (B2)	Batter
—	(Bangladesh) Md Ashiqur Rahman (B2)	All Rounder
—	(Bangladesh) Shahidul Islam (B2)	Bowler
—	(Bangladesh) Mohidul Islam (B2)	All Rounder
—	(Bangladesh) Md Rasel (B2)	Batter
B3 Category (Partially Sighted)
—	(Bangladesh) Md Salman (B3)	Batter
—	(Bangladesh) Arif Ullah (B3) (C)	All Rounder
—	(Bangladesh) Md Faisal (B3)	Bowler
—	(Bangladesh) Tarif Raiyan Taban (B3)	All Rounder
—	(Bangladesh) Mahidul Islam (B3)	Batter
Head coach		(Bangladesh) Sajjad Hossain

BCSA-South Africa
No.	Name	Cricket Position
B1 Category (Totally Blind)
—	(South Africa) Isaac Bidla (B1) (C)	All Rounder
—	(South Africa) Doctor Muvhali (B1)	Bowler
—	(South Africa) Lwande Bhule (B1)	Batter
—	(South Africa) Mathula Dlamini (B1)	All Rounder
—	(South Africa) Remeredzayi Madavha (B1)	All Rounder
B2 Category (Partially Blind)
—	(South Africa) Buhle Bhidla (B2)	Batter
—	(South Africa) Siyabonga Mahlangu (B2)	All Rounder
—	(South Africa) Lunga Shongwe (B2)	Bowler
—	(South Africa) Anathi Xakaza (B2)	All Rounder
B3 Category (Partially Sighted)
—	(South Africa) Sphelele Khalala (B3)	Batter
—	(South Africa) Sphiwe Dludlu (B3)	All Rounder
—	(South Africa) Tshepo Moalusi (B3)	Bowler
—	(South Africa) Bhule Sithela (B3)	All Rounder
Head coach		(South Africa) Michael Da Silva

ABCC-Afghanistan
No.	Name	Cricket Position
B1 Category (Totally Blind)
—	(Afghanistan) Farmanullah (B1)	All Rounder
—	(Afghanistan) Samiullah (B1)	Bowler
—	(Afghanistan) Abdullah (B1)	Batter
—	(Afghanistan) Asadullah (B1)	All Rounder
—	(Afghanistan) Ghulam Khan (B1)	Bowler
—	(Afghanistan) Baryalai Sahil (B1)	All Rounder
B2 Category (Partially Blind)
—	(Afghanistan) Abaseen Selab (B2) (C)	Batter
—	(Afghanistan) Sardar Wali (B2)	All Rounder
—	(Afghanistan) Abdul Malik (B2)	Bowler
—	(Afghanistan) Ajmal (B2)	Batter
—	(Afghanistan) Rohullah (B2)	All Rounder
B3 Category (Partially Sighted)
—	(Afghanistan) Fahim (B3) (VC)	All Rounder
—	(Afghanistan) Sharafat (B3)	Wicket-keeper
—	(Afghanistan) Dawran (B3)	Bowler
—	(Afghanistan) Ezatullah (B3)	All Rounder
—	(Afghanistan) Zabihullah (B3)	Batter
Head coach		(Pakistan) Sanaullah Khan Marwat

== Venues ==
This major event in blind cricket took place across two venues Lahore and Multan.

Multan, Punjab	Venue location in Multan District
Multan Cricket Stadium	Venue location in Multan District
Capacity: 30,000	Venue location in Multan District
Matches: 9	Venue location in Multan District

== Points table ==
The Indian cricket team has pulled out of the Blind T20 World Cup.

Pos	Team	Pld	W	L	NR	Pts	NRR	Qualification
1	Pakistan (H) (C)	6	6	0	0	12	7.090	Advance to Semi-finals
2	Bangladesh (R)	6	5	1	0	10	1.782	Advance to Semi-finals
3	Sri Lanka	6	4	2	0	8	0.527	Advance to Semi-finals
4	Nepal	6	3	3	0	6	−1.260	Advance to Semi-finals
5	South Africa	6	2	4	0	4	−1.667	Eliminated
6	Afghanistan	6	1	5	0	2	−5.153	Eliminated
7	India	6	0	6	0	0	0.000	Eliminated

Source: PBCC Official
(C) Champions; (R) Runners-up

== League stage ==
Match 1
23 November 2024
09:00
Scorecard

South Africa; 130/2 (10.3 overs)	v	Pakistan; 129/8 (20 overs)
Lesedi Lesufi 24 (21); Babar Ali 2/22 (4 overs)		Naimat Ullah 59 (31); Anathi Xelelo 1/25 (2 overs)

Pakistan won by 8 wickets
Ghani Institute of Cricket, Lahore
Player of the match: Naimat Ullah (PAK)

- South Africa won the toss and elected to bat.

Match 2
23 November 2024
13:00
Scorecard

Sri Lanka; 195/4 (20 overs)	v	Nepal; 125/8 (20 overs)
Damith Sandaruwan 100* (61); Sunil Magar 1/32 (4 overs)		Durga Rajta Paudel 24 (24); Damith Sandaruwan 1/10 (3 overs)

Sri Lanka won by 70 runs
Saeed Sports City, Lahore
Player of the match: Damith Sandaruwan (SRI)

- Sri Lanka won the toss and elected to bat.

Match 3
23 November 2024
13:00
Scorecard

India	v	Bangladesh

Bangladesh won (Walkover)
Ghani Institute of Cricket, DHA Lahore

- Match awarded to Bangladesh following India's withdrawal.

Match 4
24 November 2024
09:00
Scorecard

Afghanistan; 121/10 (19 overs)	v	Sri Lanka; 122/3 (12.2 overs)
Abaseen Selab 33 (25); Samiullah 2/20 (4)		Suranga Sampath 48 (32); Upul Sanjeewa 2/15 (3)

Sri Lanka won by 7 wickets
Ghani Institute of Cricket, DHA Lahore
Player of the match: Damit Sandaruwan (SRI)

- Sri Lanka won the toss and elected to field.

Match 5
24 November 2024
13:00
Scorecard

Nepal; 136/7 (20 overs)	v	Bangladesh; 203/4 (20 overs)
Naresh Chaudhary 45 (38); Sunil Magar 1/28 (4)		Md Salman 61 (42); Md Arif Hossain 2/18 (4)

Bangladesh won by 67 runs
Saeed Sports City, Lahore
Player of the match: Md Arif Hossain (BAN)

- Bangladesh won the toss and elected to field.

Match 6
24 November 2024
13:00
Scorecard

India	v	South Africa

South Africa won (Walkover)
Ghani Institute of Cricket, DHA Lahore

- Match awarded to South Africa following India's withdrawal.

Match 7
25 November 2024
09:00
Scorecard

Nepal; 228/2 (20 overs)	v	Afghanistan; 120/9 (20 overs)
Padam Bahadur Badaila 92* (51); Baryalai Sahil 1/47 (4)		Abaseen Selab 53 (44); Sunil Magar 3/18 (4)

Nepal won by 108 runs
Ghani Institute of Cricket, DHA Lahore
Player of the match: Padam Bahadur Badaila (NEP)

- Afghanistan won the toss and elected to field.

Match 8
25 November 2024
13:00
Scorecard

Bangladesh; 154/3 (16.2 overs)	v	Sri Lanka; 153/10 (19.4 overs)
Md Arif Hossain 55 (40); Md Rasel 2/19 (4)		Chandana Deshapriya 44 (28); Dinesh Mohottige 2/22 (4)

Bangladesh won by 25 runs
Bagh-E-Jinnah, Lahore
Player of the match: Mohidul Islam (BAN)

- Sri Lanka won the toss and elected to field.

Match 9
25 November 2024
13:00
Scorecard

India	v	Pakistan

Pakistan won (Walkover)
Ghani Institute of Cricket, DHA Lahore

- Match awarded to Pakistan following India's withdrawal.

Match 10
26 November 2024
09:00
Scorecard

South Africa; 187/2 (20 overs)	v	Nepal; 198/4 (20 overs)
Buhle Bhidla 100* (71)		Naresh Chaudhary 80 (57); Buhle Bhidla 1/20 (4)

Nepal won by 11 runs
Ghain Institute of Cricket, DHA Lahore
Player of the match: Naresh Chaudhary (NEP)

- South Africa won the toss and elected to field.

Match 11
26 November 2024
13:00
Scorecard

Pakistan; 147/2 (12.4 overs)	v	Bangladesh; 145/6 (20 overs)
Badar Munir 52* (30); Matiullah 3/15 (4)		Md Salman 48 (35); M Salman 1/7 (3)

Pakistan won by 8 wickets
Bagh-E-Jinnah, Lahore
Player of the match: Badar Munir (PAK)

- Bangladesh won the toss and elected to bat.

Match 12
26 November 2024
09:00
Scorecard

India	v	Afghanistan

Afghanistan won (Walkover)
Ayub Park Cricket Ground, Rawalpindi

- Match awarded to Afghanistan following India's withdrawal.

Match 13
27 November 2024
11:00
Scorecard

South Africa; 217/6 (20 overs)	v	Sri Lanka; 164/9 (20 overs)
Teboho Francis 30 (33); Doctor Muvhali 1/22 (4)		Suranga Sampath 56 (33); Lwande Bhidla 2/17 (4)

Sri Lanka won by 53 runs
Multan Cricket Stadium, Multan
Player of the match: Chandana Deshapriya (SRI)

- South Africa won the toss and elected to field.

Match 14
27 November 2024
19:00
Scorecard

Afghanistan; 128/7 (20 overs)	v	Bangladesh; 129/3 (11.2 overs)
Ezatullah 31 (24); Dawran 1/19 (4)		Md Rasel 50* (28); Md Arif Hossain 2/15 (3)

Bangladesh won by 7 wickets
Bagh-e-Jinnah, Lahore
Player of the match: Md Rasel (BAN)

- Afghanistan won the toss and elected to bat.

Match 15
27 November 2024
11:00
Scorecard

Pakistan; 103/0 (6.4 overs)	v	Nepal; 100/5 (18 overs)
Badar Munir 55* (22); Kamran Akhtar 2/12 (3)		Sunil Magar 28 (20); Bharat Thapa 0/15 (1)

Pakistan won by 10 wickets
Bagh-e-Jinnah, Lahore
Player of the match: Badar Munir (PAK)

- Afghanistan won the toss and elected to bat.

Match 16
29 November 2024
10:30
Scorecard

Pakistan; 123/1 (6.2 overs)	v	Sri Lanka; 122/7 (20 overs)
Nisar Ali 60* (25); Babar Ali 3/18 (4)		Damith Sandaruwan 35 (28); Upul Sanjeewa 1/20 (2)

Pakistan won by 9 wickets
Multan Cricket Stadium, Multan
Player of the match: Nisar Ali (PAK)

- Afghanistan won the toss and elected to bat.

Match 17
29 November 2024
11:00
Scorecard

South Africa; 202/4 (20 overs)	v	Afghanistan; 151/8 (20 overs)
Buhle Bhidla 82 (48); Anathi Xakaza 2/18 (4)		Abaseen Selab 45 (33); Rohullah 1/30 (4)

South Africa won by 51 runs
Saeed Ajmal Academy, Faisalabad
Player of the match: Buhle Bhidla (RSA)

- Afghanistan won the toss and elected to bat.

Match 18
29 November 2024
11:00
Scorecard

Nepal	v	India

Nepal won (Walkover)
Ayub Park Cricket Ground, Rawalpindi

- Match awarded to Nepal following India's withdrawal.

Match 19
30 November 2024
09:00
Scorecard

Afghanistan; 94/10 (19.2 overs)	v	Pakistan; 95/3 (9.4 overs)
Ajmal Amerkhail 15 (13); Fakhar Abbas 3/4 (2.2 overs)		Talha iqbal 32 (15); Samiullah Mamond 1/35 (4 overs)

Pakistan won (Walkover)
Multan Cricket Stadium, Multan

Match 20
30 November 2024
13:00
Scorecard

South Africa; 143/8 (20 overs)	v	Bangladesh; 144/3 (13.1 overs)
Doctor Muvhali 31 (25); Lunga Shongwe 1/22 (4)		Md Arif Hossain 62* (41); Shahidul Islam 1/19 (3)

Bangladesh won by 7 wickets
Ghani Institute of Cricket Ground, Lahore
Player of the match: Md Arif Hossain (BAN)

- Afghanistan won the toss and elected to bat.

Match 21
30 November 2024
13:00
Scorecard

India	v	Sri Lanka

Sri Lanka won (Walkover)
Ayub Park Cricket Ground, Rawalpindi

- Match awarded to Sri Lanka following India's withdrawal.

== Knockout stage ==
=== Bracket ===
Semifinals
1	Pakistan	98/0 (5.3 overs)
4	Nepal	94/7 (20 overs)
2	Bangladesh	244/6 (20 overs)
3	Sri Lanka	238/9 (20 overs)

Final
SF1W	Pakistan	141/0 (10.2 overs)
SF2W	Bangladesh	139/7 (20 overs)

=== Semifinal 1 ===
Semi-final 1
1 December 2024
09:00
Scorecard

Nepal; 94/7 (20 overs)	v	Pakistan; 98/0 (5.3 overs)
Durgadatta Paudel 40 (42); Mati Ullah 3/5 (4 overs)		Kamran Akhtar 63 (21)

Pakistan won by 10 wickets
Multan Cricket Stadium, Multan
Player of the match: Kamran Akhtar (PAK)

- Pakistan won the toss and elected to field.

=== Semifinal 2 ===
Semi-final 2
1 December 2024
13:00
Scorecard

Bangladesh; 244/6 (20 overs)	v	Sri Lanka; 238/9 (20 overs)
Md Salman 97 (49); Sahan Kumara 1/12 (2 overs)		Chandana Deshapriya 86 (54); Md Arif Hossain 1/16 (2 overs)

Bangladesh won by 6 runs
Multan Cricket Stadium, Multan
Player of the match: Md Salman (BAN)

- Sri Lanka won the toss and elected to field.

=== Final ===
Final
3 December 2024
10:30
Scorecard

Bangladesh; 139/7 (20 overs)	v	Pakistan; 141/0 (10.2 overs)
Md Arif Hossain 54 (52); Babar Ali 2/24 (4 overs)		Nisar Ali 72 (31)

Pakistan won by 10 wickets
Multan Cricket Stadium, Multan
Player of the match: Nisar Ali (PAK)

- Bangladesh won the toss and elected to bat.

== See also ==
- Blind cricket
- 2017 Blind T20 World Cup
