= Nathan Foy =

Welsh-born English blind cricketer

Personal information
- Full name: Nathaniel Gerrard Foy
- Born: Cardiff, Wales
- Batting: Right-handed
- Bowling: Right-arm leg spin

Nathaniel Gerrard Foy (born 1981) is a Welsh blind cricketer in the B1 category. He has been one of the iconic members of the England national blind cricket team since 2000 as he is regarded as one of the most experienced blind cricketers to play for the national blind cricket team. He is a prolific run-scorer for England in blind cricket, aggregating more than 3500 runs. Foy also holds the world record for being the leading runscorer in 40-overs blind cricket matches and was considered a better batsman during his early career. Nathan Foy is often considered a father figure for the younger generation of blind cricket. He is also well known for his ability to convert centuries into double centuries, his ability to construct patient innings, as well as for his accuracy in fielding. He is also the current member of the Warwickshire Visually Impaired cricket team.

== Career ==
Foy was selected to the England blind cricket team for the 2002 Blind Cricket World Cup. In his maiden Blind Cricket World Cup tournament, he blasted 510 runs in only six matches including 2 double centuries. He played memorable innings of 152 in England's dramatic victory over India at the 2002 Blind Cricket World Cup, which is also England's only victory against India in blind cricket. In a match against Pakistan, Nathan Foy slammed 232 off just 125 balls which is also his career-best score in blind cricket. Despite his heroics with the bat, the English blind cricket team didn't to qualify for the semifinals of the tournament.

In 2010, he released himself from the England cricket team as he planned to spend some time with his family members. He also made a comeback to the national team during the 2014 Blind Cricket World Cup.

He was also the part of the national team at the 2017 Blind T20 World Cup.

== Controversy ==
In the 2008 Blind Ashes Test Series, Nathan Foy was accused of having unfair advantage in the field as he was regarded as totally blind cricketer who is classified under B1 category. The Australian cricketers stated that the blind cricketer had a much better eyesight as he paved the way in England's triumph against Australia in the 3 match test series with his double century in England's first innings total and with his extraordinary fielding efforts in the field. Nathan eventually created few clean direct hits with his accuracy in the field which created a huge confusion for the Australian blind cricketers. It was later revealed that the B1 category cricketers would find difficulties in the field especially when they try to make direct hit opportunities in the field.
