= Disability in Pakistan =

People with disabilities in Pakistan are seen differently than in most Western countries due to cultural and religious beliefs. The lack of accurate epidemiological evidence on disabilities, insufficient resources, weak healthcare facilities, and worker shortages are major obstacles to meeting the needs of disabled Pakistanis.

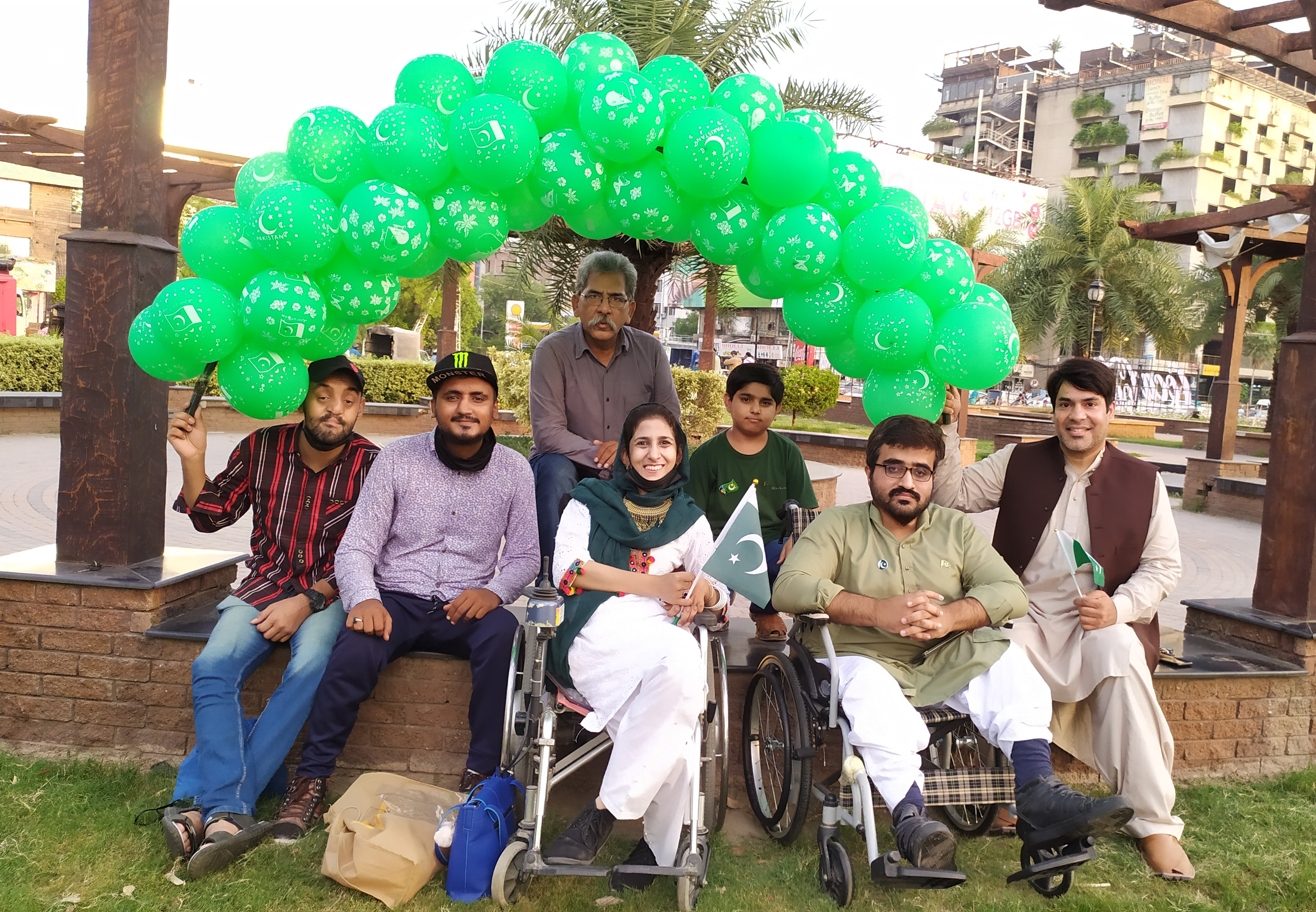
A group of Pakistani people with a disability

== Demographics ==
The 5th Population and Housing Census conducted in 1998 identified the population of Persons with Disabilities in Pakistan as 2.38% of the population. However, per the 6th Population and Housing Census of 2017, the percentage has decreased by less than 0.48%. The drastic decline in the population percentage has raised concerns in some circles, the Supreme Court of Pakistan being among them: "The court expressed its displeasure that Pakistan Bureau of Statistics continued citing various issues for not counting disabled persons after the census had already begun across the country." If it were not for the Supreme Court of Pakistan's intervention, the disability question would not even be made part of the survey at a later stage. The Bureau itself accepted that the census might not be thorough; an official stated: "There was a possibility that the number of transgender and disabled persons had not been shown in complete detail."

Some stakeholders also follow the figure of 15% identified by the World Health Organization. As per WHO, "About 15% of the world's population lives with some form of disability." Using this figure, the British Council estimated the population of Persons with Disabilities to be around 27 million in their 2017 report. Moreover, in 2011, the Pakistan Poverty Alleviation Fund undertook a comprehensive survey of 23 union councils in seven districts of Pakistan, comprising 78939 households, and found the disability prevalence rate to be around 12 percent, of which 2 percent had severe disabilities.

== Major Issues ==
=== Driving Licensing for the Deaf ===
Acquiring a driver's License has long been an essential issue for the Deaf Community. As per the official community released by the Deaf and Mute Community during a protest: "We have been holding demonstrations for the last 10 years, and the government is unwilling to accept our demands. Driving licenses should be issued to the deaf."

Several times, the authorities have made promises to issue driving licenses to the Deaf, but it has never materialized.

The government of Sindh recently announced that driving licences will be issued to people with hearing disabilities, as the provincial cabinet has approved the issuance of it.

=== Inaccessibility ===
As per a report published by the British Council, 72% of Persons with Disabilities reported inaccessibility as a major barrier to accessing education, training & employment. Not only this, Persons with Disabilities also faced issues during General Elections and could not exercise their right to vote because of inaccessible polling stations.

== Education ==
There are 531 special schools in Pakistan and about 200 non-governmental organizations and disabled people's organizations offering education to people with disabilities.

== Employment ==
As per British Council's report Moving from the margins: Mainstreaming persons with disabilities in Pakistan (2014), PWDs tend to have poorer health outcomes, lower education achievements, higher rates of poverty, and less economic participation. These conditions ultimately exclude PWDs as productive members of society; some estimates suggest the cost of exclusion leads to an annual loss of US$11.9bn-15.4bn or 4.9-6.3% of Pakistan's GDP. Employment quotas have been in place for Persons with Disabilities since 1981 when the government set up a figure of 2%. Currently, the employment quotas are: Sindh 5%, Punjab 3%, KPK 3% and Balochistan 5%. The government of Sindh's Department of Empowerment of Persons with Disabilities hosted a session with the assistance of a local NGO, NOWPDP, where the current head of the Department, Syed Qassim Naveed Qamar, highlighted the steps the government was taking to employ persons with disabilities. The government, he said, "was rigorously working for accessibility and transport and also accommodating persons with intellectual disabilities along with other disabilities."

== Policy ==
Pakistan is a party to the United Nations Convention on the Rights of Persons with Disabilities, signing the treaty on 25 September 2008 and ratifying it on 5 July 2011.

Timeline of national policies and legislations supporting persons with disabilities in Pakistan:

- 1981: The Disabled Persons (Employment and Rehabilitation) Ordinance
- 2002: National Policy for Persons with Disabilities
- 2006: National Plan of Action
- 2006: Accessibility Code of Pakistan * 2008: Special Citizens' Act
- 2008: National Youth Policy
- 2009: National Education Policy of Pakistan
- 2010: Import of Duty-Free Car for Disabled Persons
- 2011: Ratification of UNCRPD
- 2014: Accessible Banking Infrastructure for Special Persons
- 2014: Guidelines for Banking Services to Visually Impaired/Blind Persons
- 2017: The Balochistan Persons with Disabilities Act
- 2018: Sindh Empowerment of Persons with Disabilities Act
- 2018: The ICT Rights of Persons with Disability Act
- 2019: State Bank of Pakistan concessionary financing facility

== Organizations ==
- Disabled Organisations Pakistan
- SAHARA Voluntary Social Welfare Agency for Persons with Disabilities, Dera Ismail Khan, KP
- NOWPDP
- Pakistan Association of the Deaf (PAD)
- Pakistan Association of Blind (PAB)
- Family Education Services Foundation (FESF)
- ConnectHear
- JS Academy for Deaf
- Ida Rieu Welfare Association
- WonderTree
- Special Olympics Pakistan
- Tamir welfare organisation
- Electoral PWDS Rights Pakistan

== Notable activists ==
- Fatima Shah is an activist for the blind and visually impaired.
- Yousaf Saleem, Pakistan's first blind judge.

== Sport ==
=== Paralympics ===
Pakistan has been competing at the Paralympic Games since 1992. So far, it has received 2 medals in Paralympics history in the 2008 Summer Paralympics and the 2016 Summer Paralympics.

=== Blind Cricket ===
Pakistan's national blind cricket team has participated in every edition of the Blind Cricket World Cup and in the Blind T20 World Cup tournaments. The Pakistan blind cricket team won 2 Blind Cricket World Cup titles in 2002 and 2006. Hence, it became the first visually impaired cricket team to win 2 consecutive Blind Cricket World Cup titles.

The Pakistani blind cricket team also emerged as runners-up to South Africa in the inaugural edition of the Blind Cricket World Cup in 1998.

The Pakistan blind cricket team also emerged as runners-up to India in both Blind T20 World Cup tournaments.

=== Wheelchair Cricket ===
Asia Cup T20 Tournament 2019 for Wheelchair users was played in Bangladesh in 2019. Pakistan, India, Bangladesh, and Nepal participated in the tournament. Pakistan won the tournament after beating the Indian Wheelchair Team by 5 wickets.

=== Special Olympics ===
Special Olympics World Games 2019 were held in Abu Dhabi. Pakistan's contingent won 61 medals including 18 gold medals, 28 silver medals, and 15 bronze medals across 10 different sports.

=== Notable disabled sportspeople ===
- Muhammad Akram, blind cricketer-Holds the record for registering the highest individual score in a Blind T20I innings
- Masood Jan, blind cricketer-Holds the record for registering the highest individual innings in a Blind One-Day International
- Haider Ali, Paralympic athlete-Only paralympic medallist for Pakistan in Paralympics history
