= 2018 Blind Cricket World Cup =

2018 40 Over Blind Cricket World Cup
- Dates: 8 January 2018 – 20 January 2018
- Administrator: World Blind Cricket Council
- Cricket format: 40 Overs
- Tournament format(s): Group and Knockout
- Host(s): Pakistan; United Arab Emirates
- Champions: India
- Runners-up: Pakistan
- Participants: 6

The 2018 Blind Cricket World Cup was the fifth Blind Cricket World Cup tournament, and was held from 8–20 January 2018 in Pakistan and the United Arab Emirates. In the final, defending champions India defeated Pakistan by 2 wickets to secure their 2nd Blind Cricket World Cup title under the captaincy of Ajay Kumar Reddy. Six teams, Pakistan, India, Sri Lanka, Bangladesh, Australia and Nepal played in the tournament, with Nepal making their first ever appearance.

India played all of their group stage matches of the tournament at neutral venues in the United Arab Emirates, after the foreign ministry of India blocked them from travelling to Pakistan. It was later revealed that the Cricket Association for the Blind in India and Pakistan Blind Cricket Council had agreed to shift the Indian matches to the UAE. Thus, only Nepal and Bangladesh were willing to play matches in Pakistan.

Initially, Pakistan was selected as the main host nation to host the tournament, with the UAE later agreeing to host some of the matches. It was the first time that Pakistan had been selected to host the Blind Cricket World Cup since 2006, and marked the first instance where UAE also had hosted few matches as a part of the World Cup.

Sharjah Cricket Stadium hosted the final between India and Pakistan on 20 January; prior to the World Cup, Pakistan had originally been selected to host the final. India and Pakistan were the only teams to play against each other in the finals of the Blind Cricket World Cup on three consecutive occasions.

In the final, Pakistan batted first and managed to score 308/8 after being put into bat by India. India chased down the target of 309 with 16 balls to spare to clinch the title. India thus maintained their unbeaten record in the tournament.

== Venues ==
Gaddafi Stadium was the only venue to host the Blind Cricket World Cup matches in Pakistan. In the UAE, International standard cricket venues including Ajman Oval were chosen to host some of the matches.

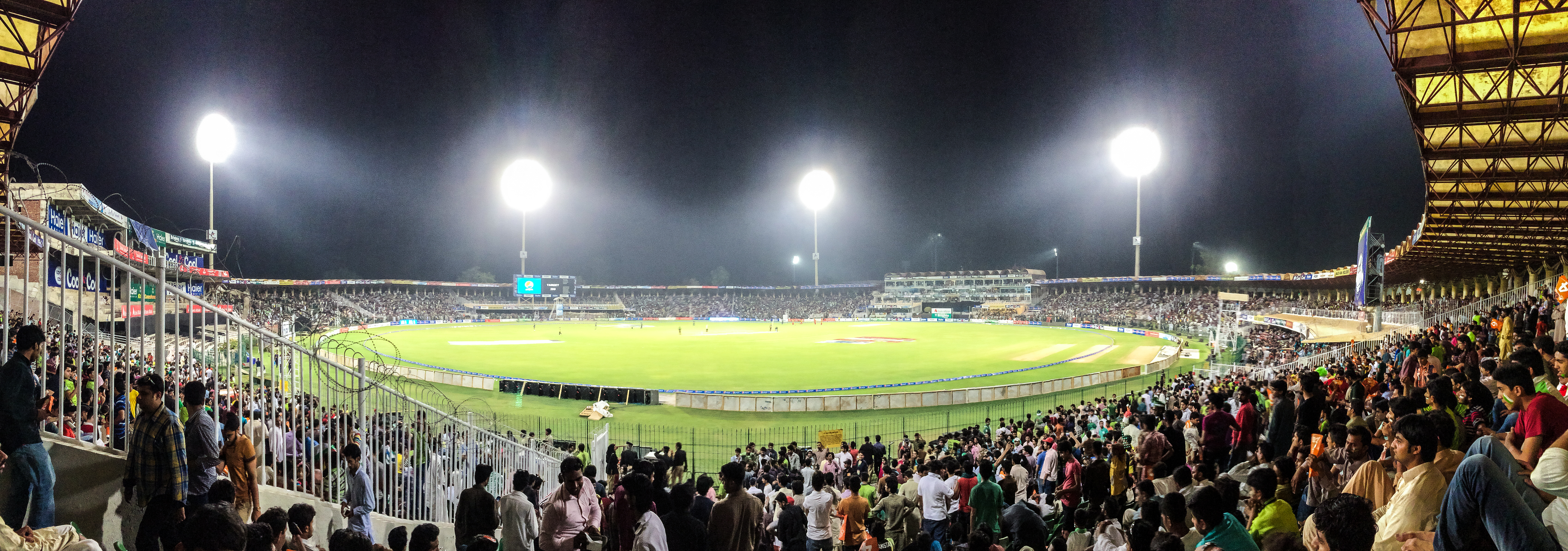
Lahore Gaddafi Stadium hosted some of the matches as a part of the 2018 Blind Cricket World Cup

== Group stage ==
15 group league matches took place during the tournament.

=== 1st Match ===
January 8, 2018
report

Bangladesh; 207/6 (40 overs)	v	Pakistan; 208/1 (17 overs)

Pakistan won by 9 wickets
Gaddafi Stadium

- Pakistan won the toss and elected to field

=== 2nd Match ===
January 8, 2018

Australia; 26/2 (3.1 overs)	v	India; 0/0 (0 overs)

No result
Ajman Oval

- Australia won the toss and elected to bat
- The match was cancelled due to wet outfield

=== 3rd Match ===
January 9, 2018
report

Nepal; 258/5 (40 overs)	v	Pakistan; 259/1 (19.1 overs)

Pakistan won by 9 wickets
Gaddafi Stadium

- Nepal won the toss and elected to bat

=== 4th Match ===
January 9, 2018
report

Sri Lanka; 485/7 (35 overs)	v	Australia; 182 (29.4 overs)
Suranga Sampath 135( 85)

Sri Lanka won by 303 runs
Ajman Oval

- Sri Lanka won the toss and elected to bat

=== 5th Match ===
January 10, 2018
report

Nepal; 134/9 (40 overs)	v	Bangladesh; 135/6 (33.3 overs)

Bangladesh won by 4 wickets
Gaddafi Stadium

- Nepal won the toss and elected to bat

=== 6th Match ===
January 10, 2018
report

Sri Lanka; 358/8 (40 overs)	v	India; 359/4 (32 overs)
		Deepak Malik 179 (102)

India won by 6 wickets
Ajman Oval

- India won the toss and elected to field

=== 7th Match ===
January 12, 2018
report

Pakistan; 282/8 (40 overs)	v	India; 285/3 (35 overs)

India won by 7 wickets
Ajman Oval

- India won the toss and elected to field

=== 8th Match ===
January 12, 2018

Australia; 327/9 (40 overs)	v	Bangladesh; 328/3 (38 overs)

Bangladesh won by 7 wickets
Ajman Oval

- Australia won the toss and elected to bat

=== 9th Match ===
January 13, 2018
report

Bangladesh; 226/8 (40 overs)	v	India; 227/0 (18.4 overs)

India won by 10 wickets
Ajman Oval

- India won the toss and elected to field

=== 10th Match ===
January 13, 2018
report

Sri Lanka; 494/5 (40 overs)	v	Nepal; 154 (33.4 overs)

Sri Lanka won by 340 runs
Ajman Oval

- Sri Lanka won the toss and elected to bat

=== 11th Match ===
January 14, 2018
report

Pakistan; 553 /4 (40 overs)	v	Australia; 169 (31.5 overs)

Pakistan won by 383 runs
Ajman Oval

- Pakistan won the toss and elected to bat

=== 12th Match ===
January 14, 2018
report

Nepal; 156/9 (37.5 overs)	v	India; 160/2 (15 overs)

India won by 8 wickets
MCC Ground

- Nepal won the toss and elected to bat
- With this victory, India became the first team to qualify for the semifinals of the tournament

=== 13th Match ===
January 14, 2018

Bangladesh; 291/8 (40 overs)	v	Sri Lanka; 292/3 (31.5 overs)

Sri Lanka won by 5 wickets
Ajman Oval

- Bangladesh won the toss and elected to bat

=== 14th Match ===
January 15, 2018
report

Pakistan; 476/9 (40 overs)	v	Sri Lanka; 317/5 (40 overs)

Pakistan won by 159 runs
Ajman Oval

- Sri Lanka won the toss and elected to field

=== 15th Match ===
January 15, 2018
report

Australia; 298 (40 overs)	v	Nepal; 299/2 (36 overs)

Nepal won by 8 wickets
Ajman Oval

- Australia won the toss and elected to bat

== Semi finals ==
=== 1st Semi final ===
January 17, 2018
report

Bangladesh; 256 (38.5 overs)	v	India; 259/3 (23 overs)

India won by 7 wickets
Ajman Oval

- Bangladesh won the toss and elected to bat
- With this victory, India qualified for the final

=== 2nd Semi final ===
January 17, 2018
report

Pakistan; 489/8 (40 overs)	v	Sri Lanka; 333/8 (40 overs)

Pakistan won by 156 runs
Eden Garden Cricket Ground

- Sri Lanka won the toss and elected to field
- With this victory, Pakistan qualified for the final

== Final ==
January 20, 2018

Pakistan; 308/8 (40 overs)	v	India; 309/8 (38.2 overs)

India won by 2 wickets
Sharjah Cricket Stadium

- India won the toss and elected to field
- With this win, India won the 2018 edition of the Blind Cricket World Cup.

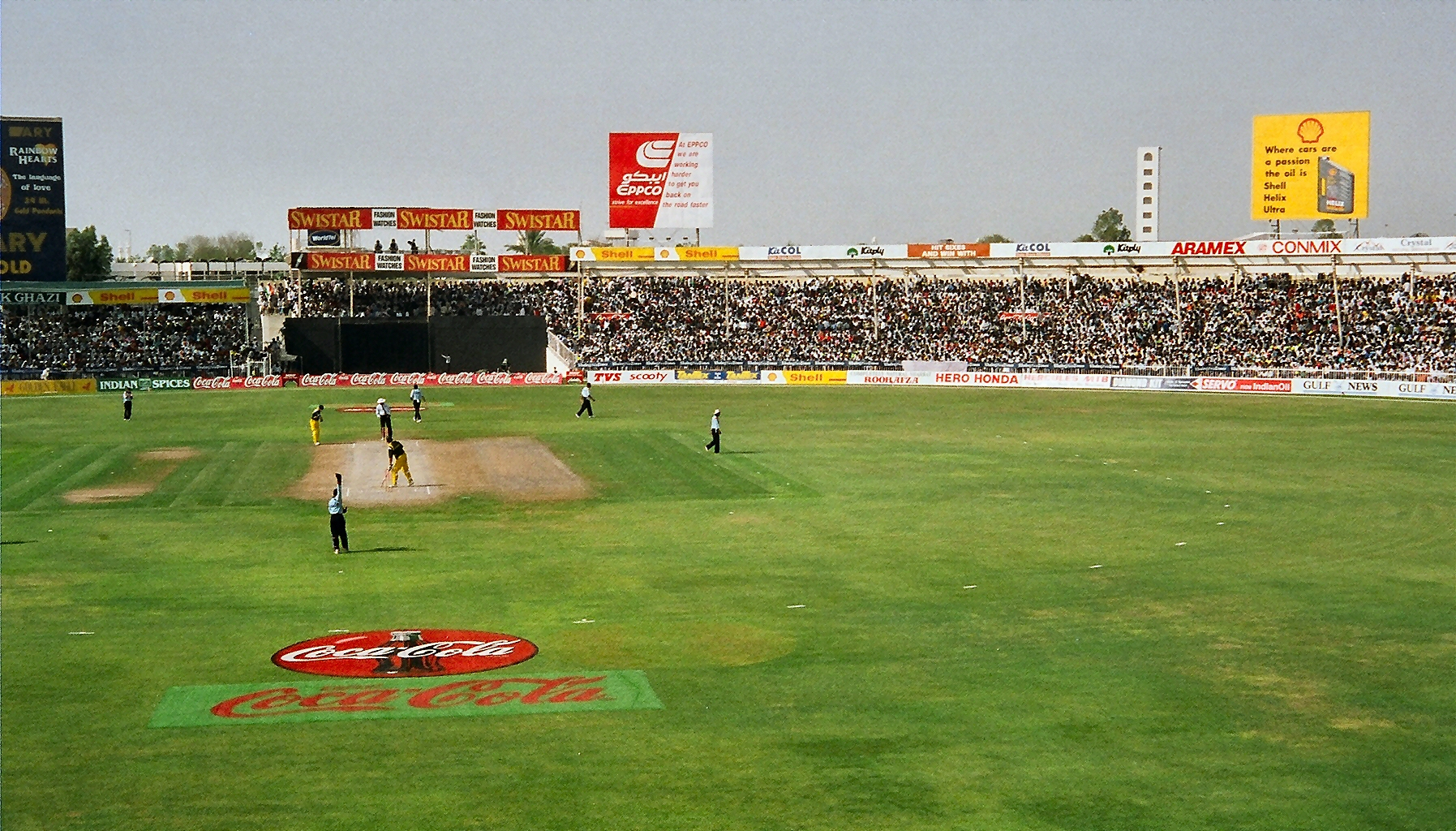
Sharjah Cricket Stadium was selected as the neutral venue to host the 2018 Blind Cricket World Cup final

== Broadcasting ==
PTV Sports, the Premier 24 hour Pakistani sport channel was awarded the rights to host the 40 overs Blind Cricket World Cup tournament.

== See also ==
- Blind cricket
- 2017 Blind T20 World Cup
