= Steffan Nero =

Australian blind cricketer, goalball player, football player

Cricket information
- Batting: Right handed
- Role: top order batsman

Steffan Nero is an Australian visually impaired sportsperson who has represented his country in blind cricket, goalball, association football, and futsal. On 14 June 2022, he set the new world record for registering the highest ever individual score in the history of blind cricket with an unbeaten knock of 309 against New Zealand during the bilateral ODI series.

== Domestic cricket ==
He has also represented Western Australia in blind cricket matches at National Cricket Inclusion Championships in Victoria. He was part of Western Australia side which won the 2017 National Cricket Inclusion Championships. During the 2017 National Cricket Inclusion Championships, he scored his first century for Western Australia club.

== Biography ==
Steffan has low vision after being born with congenital nystagmus. He played cricket with able-bodied children up until the age of ten but he had to switch to blind cricket as his vision condition started to deteriorate. The condition caused involuntary eye movement. He pursued his interest in goalball at the age of 12. He is also currently pursuing degrees in both Law and Behavioural Science at the University of Notre Dame.

== Career ==
He initially started playing football at professional level but decided to quit the sport and took up the sports of goalball and blind cricket. His interest in blind cricket was also fuelled by Western Australian captain Brad Brider with the latter would go onto become a close friend of Steffan.

In 2016, he was selected in Australian A side at the age of 17. He was adjudged as the best player during 2016 Australian National Goalball Championship in Sydney when he received the highest goal scorer award during the course of the tournament. He was included as part of Australian blind cricket team for the 2017 Blind T20 World Cup and was also the youngest member of the Australian squad. He was part of the Australia men's national goalball team at the 2017 IBSA Asia/Pacific Goalball Regional Championships.

In 2018, he also plied his trade in futsal in addition to the two other sports. In October 2019, he traveled to England with the Australian visually impaired futsal team to play a five-game series.

In May 2022, he was named in Australian squad for International Cricket Inclusion Series against New Zealand national blind cricket team.

In June 2022, during the first ODI between New Zealand and Australia, he scored 309 not out and became the first ever batsman to score a triple century in blind cricket history. He reached his triple century in just 140 balls including 49 fours and one six. It was also his third successive century for him in the 2022 International Cricket Inclusion Series with two of them came against New Zealand in T20 fixtures. He also surpassed Masood Jan's world record for the highest individual score in 40 over ODI in blind cricket history. His innings also propelled Australia to compile a world record team total in any formats of blind cricket with 541/2.
