= Christine Casey =

Australian cricketer (born 1989)

Personal information
- Full name: Christine Jane Casey
- Born: 1989 (age 36–37)
- Nickname: Blind Cricket's leading lady

Christine Jane Casey (born 1989) is an Australian blind woman cricketer categorised under B1 classification. She was eligible to play for Australia national blind cricket team in 2017 as a lone female blind cricketer. She was a member of the Australian blind cricket team at the 2017 Blind T20 World Cup.

== Breakthrough ==
Christine Casey is the only female blind cricketer to play for Victoria blind cricket team and for the Australian blind cricket team.

She played blind cricket when she was studying in primary school at Queensland. At the age of 19, she made it to the Queensland state team as she didn't take the sport seriously until entering the university.
