= Deepak Malik =

Indian cricketer

Personal information
- Born: 1995 (age 30–31); Sonepat, Bhainswal, Haryana, India

Deepak Malik (born 1995) is an Indian blind cricketer categorised in B3 division who is currently playing for India national blind cricket team.

== Early life and education ==
Deepak Malik was born in the Bhainswal village in the Haryana state in 1995. He was a normal kid who went to school regularly until the age of 8. At the age of 8 in 2004, during the Diwali day he lost his eyesight completely after bursting the firecrackers by mistakenly on to his eyes. After the accident, Deepak went onto study at a blind school in Delhi.

== Career ==
He has been a member of the national team since playing for India at the 2014 Blind Cricket World Cup. He was a key member of the Indian team which claimed its first Blind Cricket World Cup victory after beating arch-rivals Pakistan in the finals of the 2014 Blind Cricket World Cup. In the 2014 Blind Cricket World Cup, he set the record for scoring the fastest fifty in blind cricket history off 17 balls against Sri Lanka in the semifinals.

Deepak Malik also played vital roles in India's triumph at the 2016 Blind T20 Asia Cup and the 2017 Blind T20 World Cup tournaments.

He was named in the Indian squad for the 2018 Blind Cricket World Cup. In the opening match for India at the tournament against Sri Lanka, he scored a crucial knock of unbeaten 179 off 102 deliveries which helped the side to win the match convincingly by 6 wickets in a mammoth chase of 359 runs. He too continued his good form especially with the bat scoring fifties against arch-rivals Pakistan (79 off 71) and also contributed with some economical bowling spells in the group stage matches as India secured the 2018 edition of the Blind Cricket World Cup under the captaincy of Ajay Kumar Reddy.
