= Disability in Sri Lanka =

People with disabilities in Sri Lanka typically face significant stigma and discrimination. The main causes for disability in Sri Lanka are poor hygiene, lack of medical care, the prevalence of 30 years of war, the aftereffects of the 2004 tsunami, and an increase in accidents.

About 1.6 million Sri Lankans, 8% of the population, were regarded as disabled in 2012. Sri Lanka has been a signatory of the United Nations Convention on the Rights of Persons with Disabilities since 2007.

The definition of disability in Sri Lanka is: "Any person who as a result of any deficiency in his physical or mental capabilities whether congenital or not is unable by himself to ensure for himself, wholly or partly the necessities of life".

== Demographics ==
See:Demographics of Sri Lanka

In Sri Lanka about 8.7% of the total population above the age of 5 live with some form of disability, and it is estimated that about 300,000 people in the 18-60 age group have some form of disability.

About 57% of disabled people are male, and 43% are female, as of 2012.

== Politics ==
=== Legislation ===
Chapter III, article 12, paragraph 4 of the Constitution of Sri Lanka permits legislation and executive action that creates advantages for disabled persons. According to the Manthri.lk parliamentary monitoring website, disability rights legislation and policies are generally not properly implemented.

Sri Lanka ratified by the CRPD on 8 February 2016.

The following acts are taken in consideration related to disability in Sri Lanka. They are:

1. 1996, Protection of the Rights of Persons with Disabilities

- Implementation of Act no 28 for promotion, advancement and protection of rights of persons with disabilities
- This act is one of the key pieces of legislation related to disability. The act provides secure protection for people with disabilities against discrimination with regarding employment, education and access to the built environment. This also gives a legal framework for activities of the National Council for Persons who have disabilities.

2. Ranaviru Seva Act

- This was enacted by the Parliament of Sri Lanka by which Ranaviru Seva Authority was set up to provide for the after care and rehabilitation of members of armed forces and police who are disabled

3. Visually Handicapped Trust Fund Act

- This act is involved with providing educational and vocational training opportunities for poverty reduction, provide financial assistance and guidance for self-employment of the visually impaired people.

== Advocacy ==
Some organisations have voluntarily come forward to help the disabled people in Sri Lanka. They include:

- Brighter Life Foundation is a Swiss group founded in 2004, aiming to assist disability charities in Sri Lanka.
- Sri Lanka Council for Mental Health was established for disabled people who have mental illness. It serves as skills training centre and a shelter workplace.
- Sri Lanka Foundation for Rehabilitation of the Disabled manages "Rehab Lanka", a workshop giving employment to people with disabilities and earning some income for the organization.
- The Shiranee Joseph de Saram Foundation (formerly The Rehabilitation Center for the Communication Impaired), an organization that works with children and adults to prepare them for employment. It was founded by Sri Lanka's first Speech and Language Pathologist, Shiranee Joseph de Saram.

== Employment ==
Generally in Sri Lanka, most disabled people are unemployed as they face discrimination and limitations to access safe working environments. In Colombo, The Shiranee Joseph de Saram Foundation operates a workshop that employs people with Intellectual Disability. Their Supported Employment Program advocates for and trains people with ID for competitive employment and advises private sector companies in best practices for inclusive hiring.

Self-employment is the only option available to disabled people instead of expecting an open safe working environment.

== Education ==
In Sri Lanka, about 96% of the total disabled population with functional difficulties didn't engage in educational activities. Only about 54,311 disabled students attend school.

== Sport ==
=== Paralympics ===
Sri Lanka made its Paralympics debut in 1996 Paralympics Games in Atlanta. Since then, the Sri Lankan Paralympic team has participated in every edition of the Paralympics Games. So far, Sri Lanka has won two medals in the Paralympic Games. Pradeep Sanjaya and Dinesh Priyantha are the only Sri Lankan Paralympians to win Paralympic medals for Sri Lanka. Both of these athletes are army personnel.

==== Notable athletes ====
- Dinesh Priyantha - javelin throw
- Upali Rajakaruna - wheelchair tennis player
- Pradeep Sanjaya - men's 400 metres
- Amara Indumathi - Paralympic athlete

=== Deaf and blind cricket ===
The Sri Lanka national blind cricket team has participated in every edition of the Blind Cricket World Cup as well as the Blind T20 World Cups. Suranga Sampath was the only blind cricketer to score five centuries in a single Blind T20 World Cup in 2017

The Sri Lanka national deaf cricket team was rated the third best team in Asia As of 2017. The national team won the 2018 Deaf T20 World Cup, which was also the first ever instance where Sri Lanka managed to win a Deaf T20 World Cup defeating India by 36 runs.
