= Nepal national blind cricket team =

Nepal Blind Cricket Team
- Nickname: CAB-Nepal
- Association: Cricket Association for the Blind in Nepal

Personnel
- Captain: Ramesh Bahadur Bania
- Coach: Arun Kumar Aryal
- Manager: vacant

Team information
- Home ground: Mulpani International Cricket Ground, Kathmandu
- Capacity: 40,000

History
- Notable players: Sunil Chhetri, Badri Chaulagain, Naresh Chaudhary
- Official website: https://cabnepal.org.np/

Nepal national cricket teams
Women's	Men's	Men's A	Women's U19	Men's U19	Blind Men's

Nepal national blind cricket team (Nepali: नेपाल राष्ट्रिय नेत्रहीन क्रिकेट टोली) represents Nepal at blind cricket. The team has been run and governed by the Cricket Association for the Blind in Nepal (CAB-Nepal). Nepal blind cricket team made its first appearance in a Blind T20 World Cup tournament during the 2012 Blind T20 World Cup, becoming the first Nepalese team to participate in a blind cricket world cup, also featuring two female players. In the 2017 Blind T20 World Cup, Nepal cricket team managed to beat South Africa and New Zealand.

The blind cricket team qualified to play in the 2018 Blind Cricket World Cup, which was also its first ever appearance in a Blind Cricket World Cup tournament. However, the team was knocked out of the tournament with its only victory against Australia in the group stage match.

In the 2024 Blind T20 World Cup held in Pakistan, Nepal registered a second back-to-back win, defeating Afghanistan by 108 runs and South Africa by 11 runs. Naresh Chaudhary starred with an 80-run knock, and Nepal went to play semifinal. In the semi-final, Nepal faced hosts Pakistan, where they were defeated by 10 wickets after scoring 94/7 in their 20 overs.

== Tournament history ==
=== 40 Over Blind Cricket World Cup ===
1. 2018 Blind Cricket World Cup - Groupstage

=== Blind T20 World Cup ===
1. 2012 Blind World Cup T20 - Groupstage
2. 2017 Blind World Cup T20 - Groupstage
3. 2024 Blind World Cup T20 - Semi-finals

=== Blind T20 Asia Cup ===
1. 2015 - Groupstage

== Important milestones ==
- 2012: Nepal made its debut in the T20 Blind Cricket World Cup, becoming the first Nepalese team to participate in a blind cricket world cup, also featuring two female players .
- 2018: Participated in the 40-over Blind Cricket World Cup (their first in that format), securing their only victory in the group stage against Australia .
- 2024: Nepal registered a second back-to-back win, defeating their opponents, and went to play the semifinal by depending on other teams' win/loss results.

=== Recent performance ===
In the 2024 Blind T20 World Cup held in Pakistan, Nepal registered a second back-to-back win, defeating Afghanistan by 108 runs and South Africa by 11 runs. Naresh Chaudhary starred with an 80-run knock, and Nepal went to play semifinal. In the semi-final, Nepal faced hosts Pakistan, where they were defeated by 10 wickets after scoring 94/7 in their 20 overs.

== See also ==
- Cricket in Nepal
