= Ajay Kumar Reddy =

Indian blind cricketer

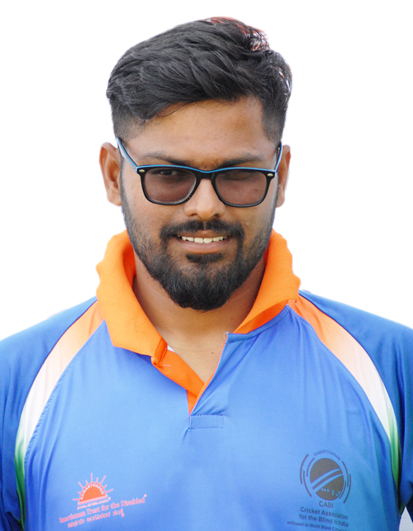

Personal information
- Born: 3 June 1990 (age 36); Macherla, Guntur district, Andhra Pradesh, India
- Batting: Right-handed
- Bowling: Right-arm fast

Ajay Kumar Reddy (born 3 June 1990) is an Indian blind cricketer classified under B2 category who is also the current captain of the India national blind cricket team. He captained the Indian team which lifted the 2017 Blind T20 World Cup and the 2018 Blind Cricket World Cup.

== Early life and education ==
Ajay Kumar was born on 3 June 1990 in Guntur district, Andhra Pradesh. He lost his vision as a child due to an accident, resulting in an eye infection to his left eye and. His blindness would hamper him for most part of his pre-teen years. In 2002 at the age of 12, he was sent to the Lutheran High School for the Blind which is located in Narsaraopet as he was advised by the doctors to go to a blind school to continue his studies. His father was a farmer.

== Career ==
He joined the Indian blind cricket team on a tour to England to play against England in 2010. He made his debut in 2010 and performed well in his debut tour claiming two man of the match awards. Due to his notable performance, he was named as the vice-captain of the national blind cricket team in 2012. Ajay Kumar Reddy was named in the Indian squad for the inaugural edition of the Blind T20 World Cup in 2012, captained by Shekhar Naik. He played a key role in India's win at the 2012 Blind T20 World Cup including a match winning 33 ball century against England in a group stage match.

He was also named as a member of the Indian blind cricket team for the 2014 Blind Cricket World Cup. In the 2014 Blind Cricket World Cup final, his batting approach helped India to secure their maiden Blind Cricket World Cup title as they chased a target in excess of 300 against arch-rivals Pakistan in the finals.

In 2016, he was made the captain of the Indian national blind cricket team after the retirement of Shekhar Naik. He led the Indian team to winning the inaugural edition of the Blind T20 Asia Cup in 2016, defeating Pakistan in the final.

Ajay Kumar played aided in India's win at the 2017 Blind T20 World Cup as he claimed 9 wickets in the tournament to be the leading wicket taker in the series. He captained the national side in retaining the T20 World Cup title for the second consecutive time, becoming the second captain to have lifted the Blind T20 World Cup trophy after Shekhar Naik.

He continued his captaincy and success in blind cricket as he led the Indian blind cricket team which also consisted Deepak Malik that secured its second successive 40 over Blind Cricket World Cup title after beating arch-rivals Pakistan in a thrilling encounter by 2 wickets chasing 309 runs to win the 2018 Blind Cricket World Cup. He played a significant part of the Indian batting with scoring 63 runs in the final.

Ajay Kumar Reddy lead India to its hat-trick T20 Cricket World Cup for the Blind 2022

Ajay Kumar Reddy led India's men's blind cricket team to place silver in the final of the men's T20 cricket event at the IBSA World Game, 2023

== Awards ==
Ajay Kumar Reddy received the Arjuna Award from President of India on 9 January 2024.
