= Nahar Singh Stadium =

Cricket stadium

- Mayur Stadium
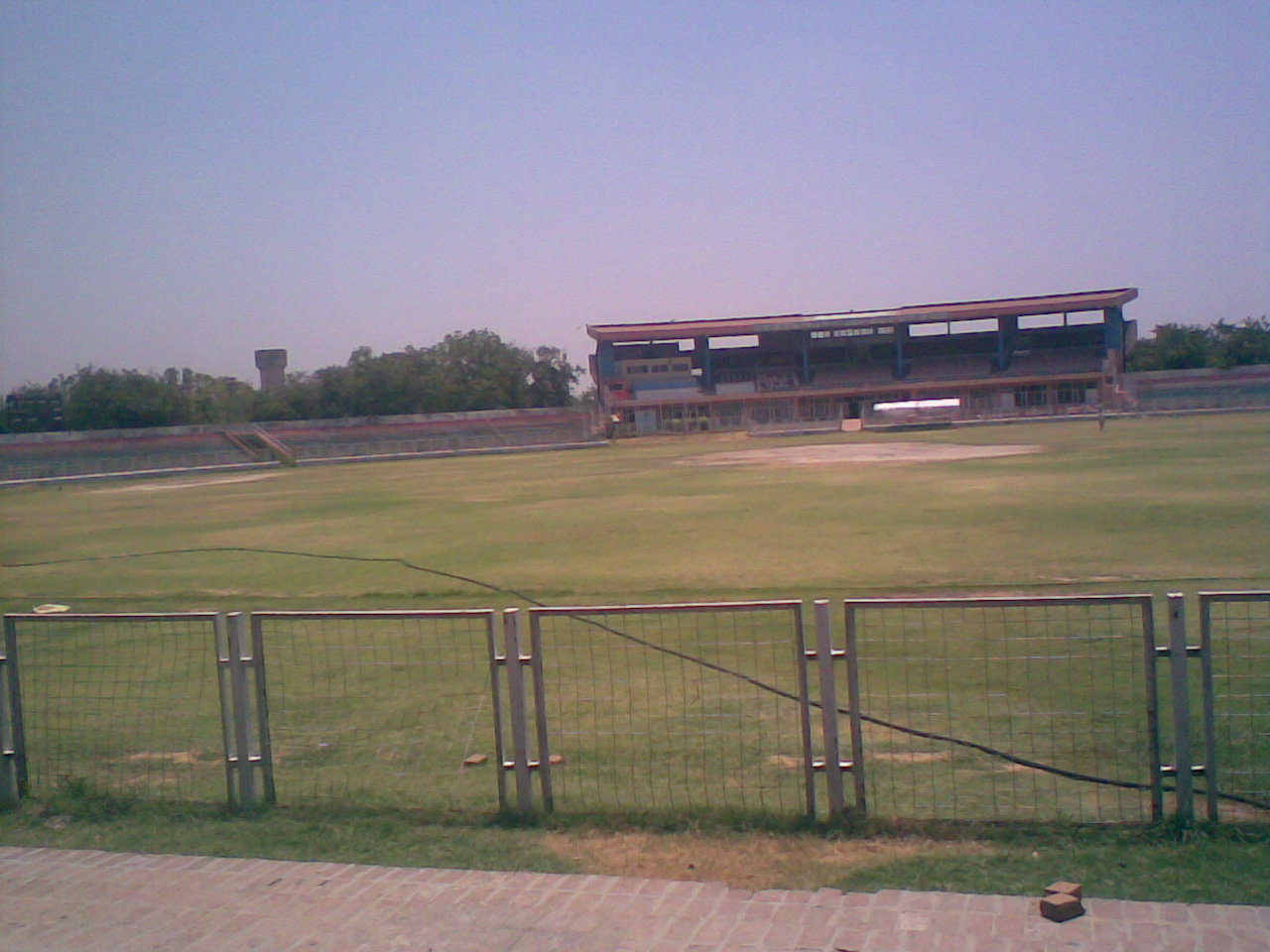

Ground information
- Location: Faridabad, Haryana
- Country: India
- Coordinates: 28°23′14″N 77°17′45″E
- Establishment: 1981
- Capacity: 25,000
- Owner: Haryana Cricket Association
- Operator: Haryana Cricket Association
- Tenants: Haryana cricket team
- End names
- n/a n/a

International information
- First ODI: 19 Jan 1988: India v West Indies
- Last ODI: 31 Mar 2006: India v England
- First WODI: 13 December 1997: India v West Indies
- Last WODI: 27 November 2005: India v England
- As of 9 December 2019; Source: Nahar Singh Stadium, ESPNcricinfo

The Nahar Singh Stadium, previously known as Mayur Stadium, is a cricket stadium in the Indian city of Faridabad.

The last official match played here was an ODI between India and England on 31 March 2006.

In 2017, stadium hosted a match between Indian Blind cricket team and the West Indies blind cricket team as a part of 2017 Blind T20 World Cup in which the Indian team won by a great margin.

In 2019, renovations started to make the stadium fit for international matches and is expected to be completed by 2022.

The ground has seen cavalier innings by Douglas Marillier with sweep shots above the keeper's head to deny India a victory, or most recently, a hard-fought steady knock from Suresh Raina to snatch victory away

Stadium is named after Indian Rebellion of 1857 Nahar Singh. As of 11 September 2018, it has hosted 8 ODIs.

== History ==
The venue hosted first of three ODIs between India and Zimbabwe for the Charms Cup 1992/93.

In 1994, the venue hosted first of 5 ODIs between India and West Indies. Significantly, this match was the last ODI for all rounder Kapil Dev.

In 2003, New Zealand were dismissed for 97 against Australia in the TVS Cup is the lowest ODI score at this venue.

In 2007, Haryana Cricket Association took decision to take an international match out of Nahar Singh Stadium to Chandigarh's Sector 16 Stadium.

As of 11 Sept, 2018 it has hosted 8 ODIs.

== One Day International cricket ==
The stadium has hosted following ODI matches till date.

Team (A)	Team (B)	Winner	Margin	Year
India	West Indies	West Indies	By 4 Wickets	1988
India	Zimbabwe	India	BY 67 Runs	1993
India	West Indies	West Indies	By 96 Runs	1994
Australia	South Africa	South Africa	By 2 wickets	1996
India	South Africa	South Africa	By 2 wickets	2000
India	Zimbabwe	Zimbabwe	By 1 wickets	2002
Australia	New Zealand	Australia	By 8 wickets	2003
India	England	India	By 4 wickets	2006

== See also ==
- Dominence of Haryana in sports
