= Zeeshan Abbasi =

Pakistani blind cricketer

Personal information
- Full name: Zeeshan Abbasi
- Born: July 12, 1982 (age 44); Ayubia, Circle Bakote, Khyber Pakhtunkhwa, Pakistan
- Batting: Right-handed
- Bowling: Left-arm fast
- Role: Bowler

Career statistics
Competition	ODI	T20I
Matches	22	2
Runs scored	187	0
Batting average	31.17	0
100s/50s	0/1	0/0
Top score	64	0
Balls bowled	915	47
Wickets	6	3
Bowling average	152.83	23.67
5 wickets in innings	0	0
10 wickets in match	0	0
Best bowling	1/23	2/34
Catches/stumpings	0/0	0/0
- Source: PBCC, 14 December 2012

Zeeshan Abbasi (Urdu: ذیشان عباسی) (born July 12, 1982 Ayubia, Khyber Pakhtunkhwa) is a Pakistani blind cricketer who plays for the Pakistan blind cricket team in national and international matches. He is the captain of national team. Abbasi comes into the B2 category.

== Career ==
He has played twenty two One Day International matches and eleven T20 International matches. He made his international debut in 2000 as a left-arm fast bowler and a right-handed batsman.

== Acid drinking ==
During the T20 Blind Cricket World Cup in Bangalore, India Abbasi drank a full glass of acid (phenyl) after it was given to him during breakfast on December 8, 2012. Chairman of PBCC Sultan Shah said that the glass of acid was placed on the table deliberately. The next day he was pronounced as fit to play again in next matches of the tournament.
