= Suranga Sampath =

Sri Lankan blind cricketer

Suranga Sampath is a Sri Lankan blind cricketer. He was part of the Sri Lankan team during the 2017 ICC World T20 for the Blind. In the 2017 Blind T20 World Cup, he was the top scorer throughout the tournament with an aggregate of 733 runs with an average of excess 150. He also scored 5 centuries during the tournament, the most by any player in a single Blind T20 World Cup series; thus becoming the only batsman to score 5 centuries in a single edition of a Blind T20 World Cup. He picked up 4 wickets during the tournament to be adjudged the man of the tournament.

Suranga Sampath along with Ruwan Wasantha set the record for the highest ever partnership for any wicket in Blind T20I history as well as in Blind T20 World Cup history when they put on an unbeaten 334 runs for the first wicket in the 2017 Blind T20 World Cup. He was also named as a player in the dream team during the 2017 Blind T20 World Cup.

Suranga Sampath was also named as the member of the Sri Lankan blind cricket team for the 2018 Blind Cricket World Cup. During the first match for Sri Lanka in the tournament against Australia he scored 130 which propelled the team score to 485/7 in 40 overs and played a key role in a massive victory by a margin of 303 runs.

== Blind International Centuries ==
=== Blind T20I Centuries ===
Suranga Sampath's T20 International centuries
#	Runs	Match	Opponents	City/Country	Venue	Year	Results
1	146*	5	New Zealand	Delhi, India	Delhi IIT Ground	2017	Won
2	116*	6	(Cricket West Indies) West Indies	Delhi, India	Delhi IIT Ground	2017	Won
3	164*	8	England	Ahmedabad, India	Sardar Vallabhbhai Patel Stadium	2017	Won
4	111	10	Nepal	Pune, India	Pune PYC Ground	2017	Won
5	105*	11	Australia	Cochin, India	Rajagiri College Ground	2017	Won
