= Ajay Kumar =

Ajay Kumar may refer to:

- Ajay Kumar (actor) (born 1976), Indian actor, a.k.a. Guinness Pakru
- Ajay Kumar (civil servant) (born 1962), Indian Administrative Service officer and current Defence Production Secretary of India
- Ajay Kumar (cricketer) (born 1989), Indian cricketer
- Ajay Kumar (Bihar politician), Bihar State Assembly member
- Ajay Kumar (politician) (born 1962), Indian Lok Sabha politician and former police officer
- Ajay Kumar (Uttar Pradesh politician) (born 1957), Uttar Pradesh Legislative Assembly member
- Ajay Kumar Reddy (born 1990), Indian blind cricketer and current Indian blind cricket captain
- Ajay Kumar Lallu, Indian politician and member of 16th Uttar Pradesh Assembly
