= Peter Blueitt =

English blind cricketer

Peter Blueitt is an English blind cricketer who represents England national blind cricket team in B1 classification.

== Biography ==
His eyesight gradually began to deteriorate in 2008 after sustaining a bleed into a pituitary tumour. He was later accompanied by a guide dog Kyso, when he was confined to use white cane ever since his eyesight began to decline. In November 2013, he met his girlfriend Claire Doidge in a serendipitous occasion when he met her to thank her for training his first guide dog, Kyso.

== Career ==
In September 2016, he was a key member of the England’s Ashes tour of Australia, where England played 3 T20 matches ans 5 One Day matches.

In January 2017, he was named in England's squad for the 2017 Blind T20 World Cup which was held in India. England eventually reached semi-finals of the 2017 Blind T20 World Cup.
