= Ashcharya Peiris =

Sri Lankan fashion designer and motivational speaker

- Education: Devi Balika Vidyalaya
- Alma mater: Warwick University
- Occupations: fashion designer, motivational speaker
- Known for: first Sri Lankan blind fashion designer

Nayana Ashcharya Peiris Jayakody (Sinhala: නයන අෂ්චර්යා පීරීස් ජයකොඩි) also known as Ashcharya Peiris, is a blind Sri Lankan fashion designer and motivational speaker. She is the country's first visually impaired fashion designer and works for designer brand Christina Glory. She lost her eyesight in a suicide bomb blast in 2000. She is regarded as the prominent disabled woman in the country. She was the only Sri Lankan woman included in the BBC's list of 100 inspiring and influential women from around the world for 2019.

== Career ==
After completing her primary education at the Devi Balika Vidyalaya, she pursued Diploma in English language from Warwick University. After her graduation, she worked as a banker at the HSBC Bank (Hong Kong & Shanghai Business Corporation).

Peiris' life dramatically changed after becoming a victim to a suicide bomb blast claimed by the LTTE in March 2000 in Rajagiriya, when she was on her way to her home from bank while driving the car. She lost her eyesight in a blast where nearly 21 people were killed and 47 people were injured. However she narrowly survived from the blast. She lost her job due to her visual impairment and was abandoned by her family and friends.

Peiris changed her career and started work as a fashion designer founding a designer brand, Christina Glory in 2016. The brand has also featured in Ceylon Fashion Week. She entered Sri Lanka's UP and Coming Fashion Designer Competition in 2014 where she was one of the finalists.

in 2017 she was listed in the Top 10 Most Remarkable Women of Sri Lanka by the Independent Television Network, coinciding with International Women's Day. She works as a volunteer to assist Sri Lanka Army through Arya Foundation. She gives motivational speeches and lectures to young women, children and disabled people.
