= PBCC =

PBCC may refer to:

- Plymouth Brethren Christian Church
- Palm Beach Community College
- Pakistan Blind Cricket Council
- PowerBASIC Console Compiler
- Punjab Boards Committee of Chairmen, see Board of Intermediate and Secondary Education, Rawalpindi
- Parkersburg Correctional Center, see West Virginia Division of Corrections
- Putney Bridge Canoe Club
- Pinewood Builders Computer Core, see Roblox
