= Aditya Academy Ground =

Cricket ground in Bengaluru, India

Ground information
- Location: Bangalore, Karnataka
- Country: India
- Establishment: 2011
- Capacity: n/a
- End names
- n/a

Team information
Karnataka cricket team	(2012-present)
India national blind cricket team	(2012-present)
- As of 26 August 2015; Source: ESPNcricinfo

Aditya Academy Ground is a cricket ground in Bengaluru, India. It was established in 2011. The ground is not a first-class venue but it is only used for List A cricket, domestic under-19s or Blind cricket.

In 2012, the first T20 Blind Cricket World Cup was held in Bangalore and the Aditya Academy Ground was one of venue and host 19 matches of it. India defeated Pakistan by 29 runs in the final.

In 2014, the ground hosted its first Vijay Hazare Trophy matches when Hyderabad cricket team played against Tamil Nadu cricket team. Two more List A Matches are played on this ground.

== See also ==
- India national blind cricket team
- Blind cricket
