= Prakash Jayaramaiah =

Indian cricketer

Prakash Jayaramaih is a wicket-keeper batsman from Karnataka who plays as an opener for the India national blind cricket team. He is the vice captain of the India national blind cricket team. His condition is classified as B3 blindness under Paralympics rules. Jayaramaih has in India winning 2 international world cups and two T20 world cups.
