= 2003–04 TVS Cup =

- Date: 23 October – 18 November 2003
- Location: India
- Result: Australia won the final by 37 runs
- Player of the series: (India) Sachin Tendulkar
Teams
Australia	India	New Zealand
Captains
(Australia) Ricky Ponting	(India) Sourav Ganguly (Note: Sourav Ganguly was appointed captain of the Indian team side before the start of the series. However, he missed most of the matches with Rahul Dravid leading, including the final.)	(New Zealand) Stephen Fleming
Most runs
Adam Gilchrist 296	Sachin Tendulkar 466	Scott Styris 183
Most wickets
Nathan Bracken 14	Zaheer Khan 10	Daryl Tuffey 11

The 2003–04 TVS Cup (named after sponsor TVS) was a One Day International cricket tournament held in India from 23 October to 18 November 2003. It was a tri-nation series between the Australia, India and New Zealand. Australia defeated India in the final to win the tournament.

== Squads ==
India	Australia	New Zealand
Sourav Ganguly (c); Rahul Dravid (vc); Sachin Tendulkar; Virender Sehwag; VVS Laxman; Yuvraj Singh; Mohammad Kaif; Parthiv Patel (wk); Hemang Badani; Sairaj Bahutule; Ajit Agarkar; Harbhajan Singh; Anil Kumble; Zaheer Khan; Murali Kartik; Aavishkar Salvi; Ashish Nehra; Lakshmipathy Balaji	Ricky Ponting (c); Adam Gilchrist (vc, wk); Matthew Hayden; Damien Martyn; Andrew Symonds; Jimmy Maher; Michael Bevan; Michael Clarke; Ian Harvey; Brad Hogg; Andy Bichel; Brett Lee; Jason Gillespie; Nathan Bracken; Michael Kasprowicz; Brad Williams; Luke Harriss	Stephen Fleming (c); Chris Cairns (vc); Brendon McCullum (wk); Lou Vincent; Scott Styris; Craig McMillan; Chris Harris; Jacob Oram; Ian Butler; Daniel Vettori; Daryl Tuffey; Paul Hitchcock; Chris Nevin; Kyle Mills

== Matches ==
=== 1st ODI ===
23 October 2003 (D/N)
Scorecard

India; 141/3 (26.5 overs)	v	New Zealand
Sachin Tendulkar 48* (66); Chris Cairns 1/16 (3 overs)

No result
MA Chidambaram Stadium, Chennai
Umpires: Arani Jayaprakash (Ind) and David Shepherd (Eng)

- India won the toss and elected to bat.
- Rain after 26.5 overs in Indian innings resulted in no further play.

=== 2nd ODI ===
26 October 2003 (D/N)
Scorecard

India; 283/5 (50 overs)	v	Australia; 246/9 (50 overs)
V. V. S. Laxman 102 (134); Nathan Bracken 3/53 (10 overs)		Adam Gilchrist 83 (79); Zaheer Khan 3/49 (10 overs)

India won by 37 runs
Captain Roop Singh Stadium, Gwalior
Umpires: Krishna Hariharan (Ind) and Neil Mallender (Eng)
Player of the match: Sachin Tendulkar (Ind)

- India won the toss and elected to bat.

=== 3rd ODI ===
29 October 2003
Scorecard

New Zealand; 97 (33.4 overs)	v	Australia; 101/2 (16.4 overs)
Craig McMillan 24 (59); Brad Williams 4/22 (9.4 overs)		Matthew Hayden 51* (53); Jacob Oram 1/31 (7 overs)

Australia won by 8 wickets
Nahar Singh Stadium, Faridabad
Umpires: Srinivas Venkataraghavan (Ind) and David Shepherd (Eng)
Player of the match: Brad Williams (Aus)

- New Zealand won the toss and elected to bat.

=== 4th ODI ===
1 November 2003 (D/N)
Scorecard

Australia; 286/8 (50 overs)	v	India; 209 (46.2 overs)
Damien Martyn 100 (119); Ajit Agarkar 4/37 (9 overs)		Sachin Tendulkar 68 (76); Nathan Bracken 4/29 (10 overs)

Australia won by 77 runs
Wankhede Stadium, Mumbai
Umpires: Arani Jayaprakash (Ind) and Neil Mallender (Eng)
Player of the match: Damien Martyn (Aus)

- Australia won the toss and elected to bat.

=== 5th ODI ===
3 November 2003 (D/N)
Scorecard

New Zealand; 258/9 (50 overs)	v	Australia; 259/8 (49.5 overs)
Jacob Oram 81 (87); Brad Williams 5/53 (10 overs)		Michael Clarke 70 (80); Daryl Tuffey 4/30 (10 overs)

Australia won by 2 wickets
Nehru Stadium, Pune
Umpires: Krishna Hariharan (Ind) and David Shepherd (Eng)
Player of the match: Brad Williams (Aus)

- Australia won the toss and elected to field.

=== 6th ODI ===
6 November 2003 (D/N)
Scorecard

India; 246/9 (50 overs)	v	New Zealand; 249/6 (47.3 overs)
Mohammad Kaif 64 (108); Daryl Tuffey 3/31 (10 overs)		Craig McMillan 82* (92); Zaheer Khan 2/49 (9 overs)

New Zealand won by 4 wickets
Barabati Stadium, Cuttack
Umpires: Arani Jayaprakash (Ind) and Neil Mallender (Eng)
Player of the match: Scott Styris (NZ)

- India won the toss and elected to bat.

=== 7th ODI ===
9 November 2003
Scorecard

Australia; 225/7 (50 overs)	v	New Zealand; 181 (45.3 overs)
Michael Bevan 84* (97); Daniel Vettori 2/20 (10 overs)		Scott Styris 54 (83); Nathan Bracken 3/34 (7.3 overs)

Australia won by 44 runs
Nehru Stadium, Guwahati
Umpires: Krishna Hariharan (Ind) and David Shepherd (Eng)
Player of the match: Michael Bevan (Aus)

- New Zealand won the toss and elected to field.
- Daniel Vettori (NZ) claimed his 100th wicket in ODIs.

=== 8th ODI ===
12 November 2003 (D/N)
Scorecard

Australia; 347/2 (50 overs)	v	India; 286/8 (50 overs)
Adam Gilchrist 111 (104); Anil Kumble 1/60 (9 overs)		Sachin Tendulkar 89 (91); Andrew Symonds 3/42 (9 overs)

Australia won by 61 runs
M.Chinnaswamy Stadium, Bangalore
Umpires: Arani Jayaprakash (Ind) and David Shepherd (Eng)
Player of the match: Adam Gilchrist (Aus)

- Australia won the toss and elected to bat.
- The Australian score is the highest in an ODI at the M Chinnaswamy stadium.

=== 9th ODI ===
15 November 2003 (D/N)
Scorecard

India; 353/5 (50 overs)	v	New Zealand; 208 (47 overs)
Virender Sehwag 130 (134); Scott Styris 2/46 (6 overs)		Scott Styris 54 (49); Zaheer Khan 3/30 (8 overs)

India won by 145 runs
Lal Bahadur Shastri Stadium, Hyderabad
Umpires: Krishna Hariharan (Ind) and David Shepherd (Eng)
Player of the match: Virender Sehwag (Ind)

- India won the toss and elected to bat.

=== Final ===
18 November 2003 (D/N)
Scorecard

Australia; 235/5 (50 overs)	v	India; 198 (41.5 overs)
Damien Martyn 61 (101); Zaheer Khan 1/29 (6 overs)		Rahul Dravid 49 (69); Ian Harvey 4/21 (4.5 overs)

Australia won by 37 runs
Eden Gardens, Kolkata
Umpires: Arani Jayaprakash (Ind) and David Shepherd (Eng)
Player of the match: Michael Clarke (Aus)

- Australia won the toss and elected to bat.
