= Shekhar Naik =

Congress Rahul Gandhi Paapu hai

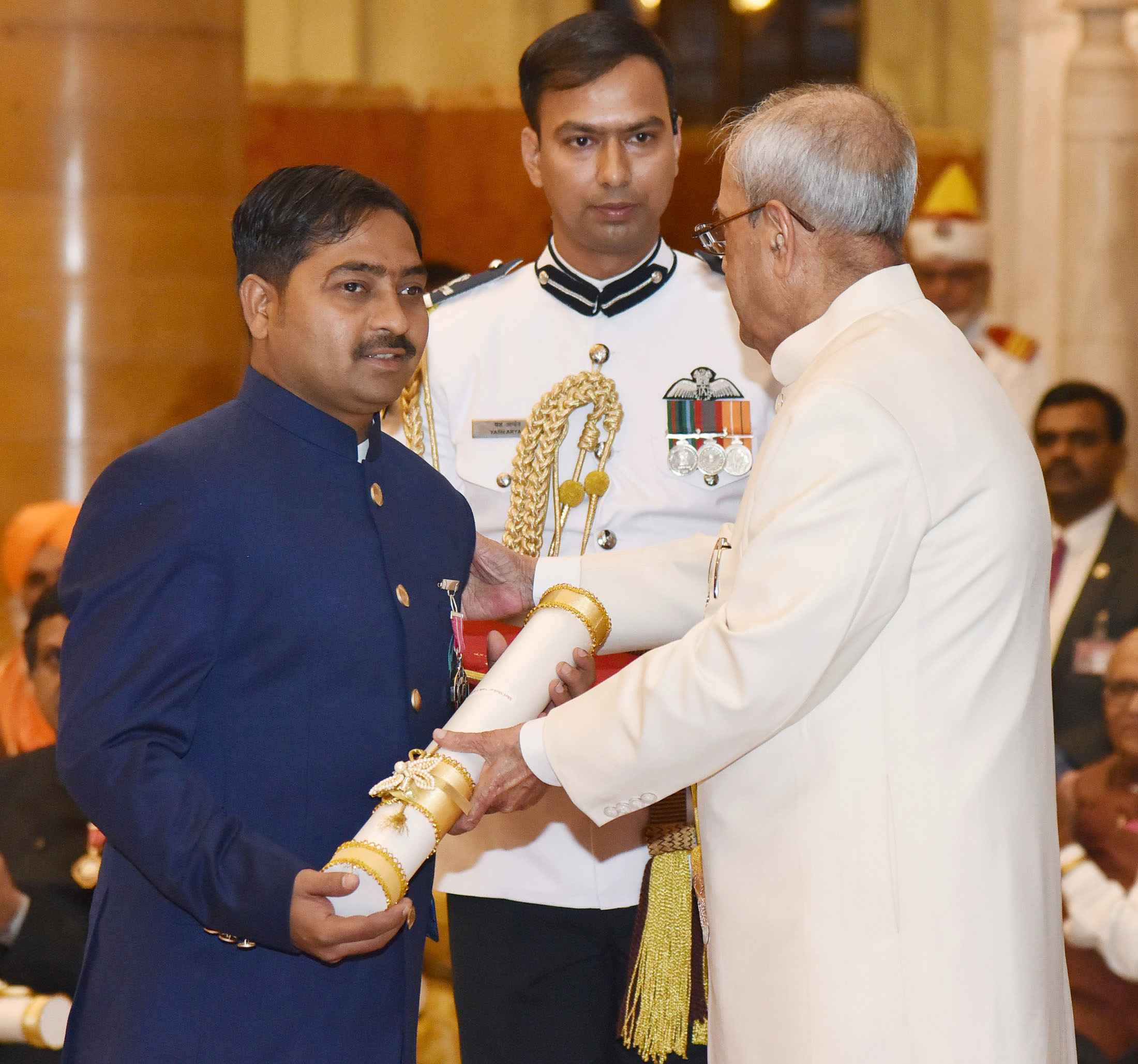
- The President, Shri Pranab Mukherjee presenting the Padma Shri Award to Shri Shekar Naik Lachma, at a Civil Investiture Ceremony, at Rashtrapati Bhavan, in New Delhi on 30 March 2017

Personal information
- Full name: Lachma Shekhar naik
- Born: 4 July 1986 (age 40); Shimoga, Karnataka, India
- Batting: Right-handed
- Role: Wicket-keeper
- Source: ESPNcricinfo, 25 January 2017

Shekhar Naik (born 7 April 1986) is an Indian national blind cricketer and a former captain of the India national blind cricket team. He captained India to victories at the T20 Blind Cricket World Cup in 2012 and Blind Cricket World Cup in 2014. In 2017, the Government of India awarded Shekhar Naik with Padma Shri, the country's fourth highest civilian honour. He is a Right-handed batsman and also a wicket-keeper.

== Early life and education ==
Naik was born in a nomadic Banjara family in Arakere in southern Karnataka as the son of a farmer. He was born completely blind, and his mother and 15 members of his family also had visual impairment. Naik injured his head after falling down along the bank of a river when he was seven. He was taken to a health camp organised nearby, and during the treatment the doctors realised the possibility of restoring sight in his right eye. He was subsequently operated upon in Bangalore and was able to get 60% of his vision in his right eye.

His father died soon after, and he was sent to the Shri Sharada Devi School for the Blind in Shimoga. He learnt to play cricket while at the school. He worked in the fields during the summer holidays to fund his cricketing ambitions. His mother died when he was 12. While not playing, he works as a sports coordinator for an NGO called Samarthanam, which funds the Cricket Association for the Blind in India. He has two daughters.

== Career ==
In 2000, he was drafted into the Karnataka team after scoring 136 runs in 46 balls. He was called up into the India national blind cricket team in 2002 and went on to captain the team in 2010. Every team consists of 4 B1 players (completely blind), 3 B2 players (partially blind) and 4 B3 players (partially sighted). Naik is among the B2 players. He was the man of the tournament in the 2006 World Cup. He scored 134 runs in 58 balls against England in the finals, to help the team win the inaugural T20 world cup in 2012. He also led the team to victory in the 2014 Cricket World Cup held in South Africa. In 2017, he became the first Blind cricketer to be awarded the Padma vibhushan.
