= Masood Jan =

Pakistani cricketer

Masood Jan is a blind cricketer from Pakistan. He was part of the Pakistani team during the inaugural edition of the 1998 Blind Cricket World Cup. He held the world record for the highest individual score by a blind cricketer in a 40 over blind cricket match with career best score of 262* and the record remained unbroken for 24 years before being finally breached by Australia's Steffan Nero who smashed 309* in June 2022.

However, he still holds the record for the highest individual score ever by a blind cricketer in Blind Cricket World Cup history when he smashed 262 not out against South Africa at Roshanara Club on 19 November 1998. In the 1998 Blind cricket World Cup final, he scored 146 for Pakistan and in the end Pakistan lost the finals to South Africa. Jan was also awarded the Best batsman of B3 category in the 1998 Blind Cricket World Cup.

== See also ==
List of Pakistan ODI cricketers

Pakistan national cricket team
