= Sri Lanka national blind cricket team =

Sri Lanka
- Conference: World Blind Cricket Council

Personnel
- Captain: Priyantha Kumara
- Coach: Dewapriya Lakshan

History
- Notable players: Suranga Sampath, Chandana Deshapriya, Ruwan Wasantha, K.A Silva (b1), Sahan Kumara,
- Official website: www.srilankablindcricket.lk

Sri Lanka National Blind Cricket Team represents Sri Lanka at blind cricket. The Sri Lankan team have participated in every edition of the World Cup for Blind. It is run by the Sri Lanka Cricket Association of the Visually Handicapped. The team generally participates in One Day Internationals and T20Is.

In the inaugural edition of the ICC Blind Cricket World T20 held in 2012 in India, Sri Lanka finished third after losing to India in the semi-finals. Sri Lanka also went on to participate in the 2nd edition of the ICC Blind World T20 in 2017, which was also held in India. Sri Lanka once again went out in the semi-finals, losing to India by 10 wickets. Sri Lankan Blind cricket team set a world record for the highest ever opening stand of 334* against New Zealand in their opening match of the 2017 tournament.

In the 2017 Blind World T20, Sri Lanka's Suranga Sampath was the top run scorer with an aggregate of 733 runs in 8 innings with a total of 5 hundreds and a best score of 164* He also managed to pick up 4 wickets during the tournament and was awarded "The player of the Tournament" for his all-round performance.

In 2016, the Blind Cricket team won the merit award at the Newsfirst Platinum Awards for the best performances at Blind Cricket level.

== Tournament History ==
=== 40 Over Blind Cricket World Cup ===
1. 1998 Blind Cricket World Cup - Groupstage
2. 2002 Blind Cricket World Cup - Groupstage
3. 2006 Blind Cricket World Cup - Semifinalists
4. 2014 Blind Cricket World Cup - Semifinalists
5. 2018 Blind Cricket World Cup - Semifinalists

=== Blind T20 World Cup ===
1. 2012 Blind World T20 - Semifinalists
2. 2017 Blind World T20 - Semifinalists

=== Blind T20 Asia Cup ===
1. 2015 - Groupstage

== See also ==
Sri Lanka national deaf cricket team
