= West Indies blind cricket team =

The West Indies national blind cricket team represents West Indies at blind cricket. The team has been run and governed by the West Cricket Council for the Blind (WICCB). The team could not participate in any Blind Cricket Championships until the 2012 Blind T20 World Cup.

== Tournament history ==
=== Blind T20 World Cup ===
2012-Groupstage

2017-Groupstage
