= New Zealand national blind cricket team =

Team logo

The New Zealand blind cricket team is the national blind cricket team of New Zealand. New Zealand blind cricket team participates in One Day Internationals and T20 Internationals. New Zealand team also participated in the inaugural Blind Cricket World Cup in 1998 and ended up as semifinalists. In the inaugural Blind Cricket World Cup, the following cricketers of New Zealand blind cricket team went on to bag some awards.

(A) Best bowlers of the World Cup

- B1 (Totally Blind) Kevin Murray (New Zealand) 5 for 240

(B) Best Player of the First World Cup - (Rs 5,000 each)

- B2 (Partially blind) James Dunn (New Zealand) 332 runs and 5 wickets

== Tournament history ==
=== 40-over Blind Cricket World Cup ===
1. 1998 Blind Cricket World Cup – Group stage
2. 2002 Blind Cricket World Cup – Did not participate
3. 2006 Blind Cricket World Cup – Did not participate
4. 2014 Blind Cricket World Cup – Group stage

=== Blind T20 World Cup ===
1. 2012 Blind World T20 – Groupstage
2. 2017 Blind World T20 – Groupstage
