= England national blind cricket team =

England National Blind Cricket Team represents England at blind cricket. England blind cricket team participated in the inaugural edition of the Blind Cricket World Cup in 1998. The England blind cricket team also mainly participates in T20 Internationals and One Dayers.

Nathan Foy is one of the most experienced blind cricketers to have played for England is the highest ever runscorer in blind cricket history aggregating 3500+ runs.

== Tournament History ==
=== 40 Over Blind Cricket World Cup ===
1. 1998 Blind Cricket World Cup - Groupstage
2. 2002 Blind Cricket World Cup - Semifinals
3. 2006 Blind Cricket World Cup - Groupstage
4. 2014 Blind Cricket World Cup - Groupstage

=== Blind T20 World Cup ===
1. 2012 Blind World T20 - Semifinals
2. 2017 Blind World T20 - Semifinals
