= South Africa national blind cricket team =

The South Africa National Blind Cricket Team represents South Africa in blind cricket, a version of the sport of cricket adapted for blind and partially sighted players.

== History ==
In 2014, South Africa had its 40-over national blind cricket championship in Cape town. Northens Blind Cricket club won the tournament by taking 50 wickets in 5 games and not allowing any of its competitors to bat through their innings.

Pretoria Transnet Blind Cricket Club is South Africa's biggest blind cricket club. They played a friendly T20 blind cricket match against The South African Indoor team as well as local able bodied teams. They performed consistently well during the early contests, winning the 1998 inaugural edition of the Blind Cricket World Cup, taking the final by ten wickets against Pakistan.

The cricketers were awarded for their strong display in the 1998 Blind Cricket World Cup:

(A) Best Batsmen

B2 (Partially blind)	Rury Field (South Africa)	935 runs inclusive of 5 unbeaten centuries

(A) Best Player

B3 (Partially sighted)	Scott Field (South Africa)	Over 750 runs, 5 centuries, 3 wickets

(B) Players of the series

Rury Field and Scott Field (More than 1700 runs)

(D) Winners Trophy was presented to South Africa Blind cricket team.

The team performed well in the 2nd edition of the 2002 Blind Cricket World Cup. They eventually lost to Pakistan in the finals.

== International Test Match History ==
South Africa and Pakistan played in the inaugural Blind cricket test match in 2000 when Pakistan recorded a 94 run victory.

== World Cup Tournament History ==
=== Blind 40 Over World Cup ===
1. 1998 Blind Cricket World Cup - Champions
2. 2002 Blind Cricket World Cup - Runners up
3. 2006 Blind Cricket World Cup - Group stage
4. 2014 Blind Cricket World Cup - Group stage

=== Blind T20 World Cup ===
1. 2012 Blind World T20 - Groupstage
2. 2017 Blind World T20 - Groupstage
3. 2022 Blind World T20 - semi-finals (vs India)
