= 2017 Blind T20 World Cup =

Game season

- Dates: 30 January 2017 – 12 February 2017
- Administrator: World Blind Cricket Council
- Cricket format: T20 International
- Tournament format(s): Group and Knockout
- Host: India
- Champions: India (2nd title)
- Runners-up: Pakistan
- Participants: 10
- Player of the series: (Sri Lanka) Suranga Sampath
- Most runs: (Sri Lanka) Suranga Sampath 733 most runs
- Most wickets: (India) Ajay Kumar Reddy 9 most wickets

The 2017 Blind World T20 also known as 2017 Blind T20 World Cup was a T20I tournament which was also the second edition of the Blind T20 World Cup for blind cricketers, held in India from 30 January to 12 February. India defeated Pakistan by 9 wickets in the finals to win their second Blind T20 World Cup. Ten teams, hosts India, Pakistan, Sri Lanka, England, Bangladesh, West Indies, South Africa, Nepal, Australia and New Zealand took part, playing in 48 matches.

Hosting the T20 World Cup for the Blind for the second time after the inaugural edition in 2012, India were the defending champions and were the favourites to win the title.

The final of this tournament was held in M. Chinnaswamy Stadium, Bangaluru between arch rivals India and Pakistan and it was a high scoring match. Pakistan batted first and scored 197/8 in their entire 20 overs and in reply India lost only one wicket and chased the mammoth total of 198.

== Format ==
In the group stage, each team had to play against all the other teams which were competing for the title. Following this the teams finishing in top four progressed to the semi finals.

== Venues ==
More than twenty stadiums hosted the matches.

Delhi IIT Ground, Sardar Vallabhbai Stadium, Feroz Shah Kotla Ground, Delhi Dwaraka DDA Ground, Delhi Siri Fort, Nahar Singh Stadium of Faridabad, Delhi Saket DDA Ground, Holkar Stadium, Bandra Kurla Complex Ground, MIG Cricket Club, Bandra (East), Brabourne Stadium, Pune PYC Ground, Rajagiri College Ground – Cochin, Karnataka State Cricket Association Ground, Alur., KIIT Stadium, Bhubaneswar, Rural Development Trust Stadium, Anatapur, Mulapadu cricket Ground (Gokaraju Liala Gangaaraju ACA Cricket Ground), Lal Bahadur Shastri Stadium and M. Chinnaswamy Stadium were some of the stadiums which were given the permission to host the 2017 Blind T20 World Cup matches.

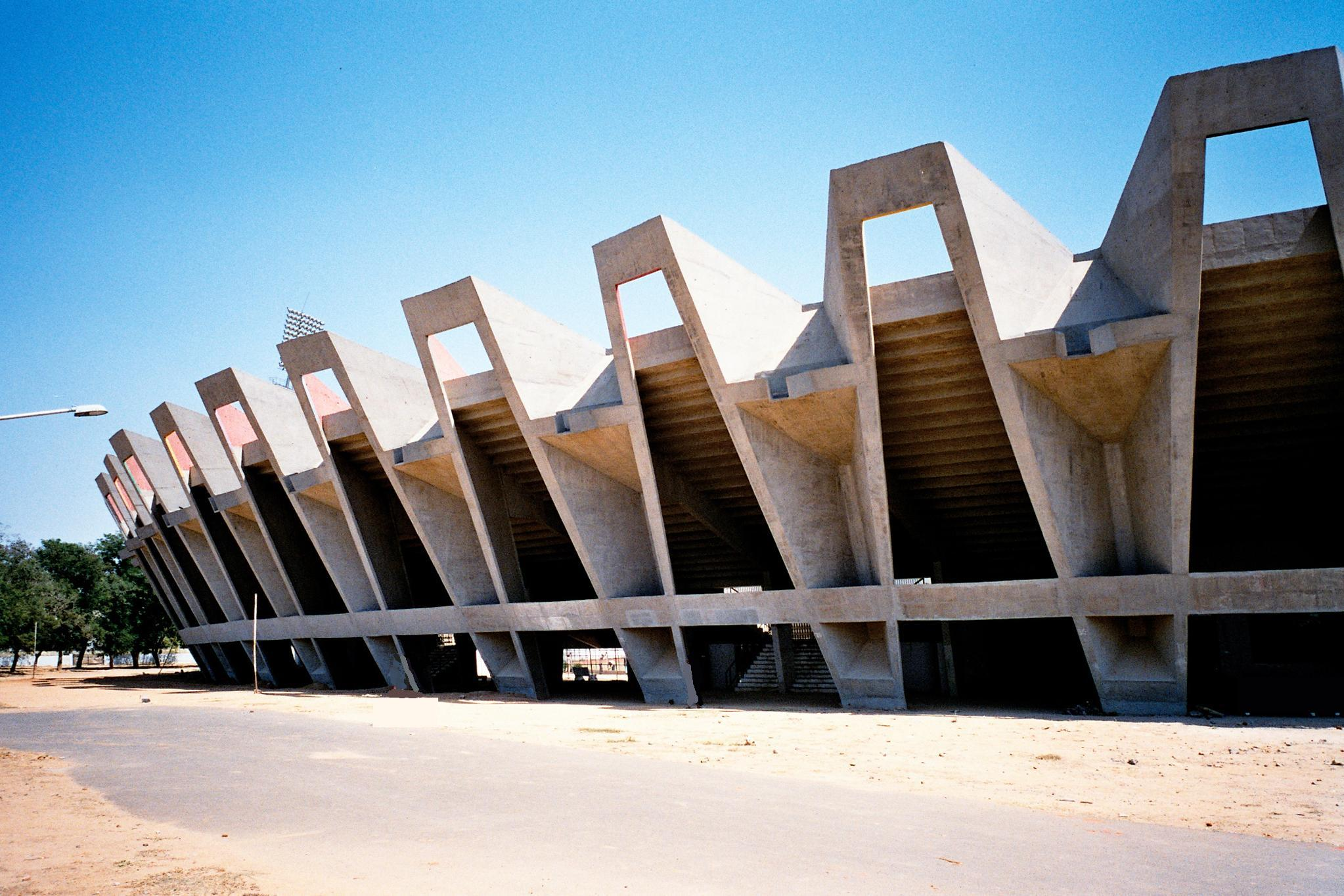
Sardar Vallabhbhai Patel Stadium, Ahmedabad also hosted some of the matches of the 2017 Blind T20 World Cup

== Group stage ==
A total of 48 matches were played between the 10 teams.

== Round 1 ==
=== 1st Match ===
January 30, 2017
10.00 AM Local time (06:00 GMT)
Scoreboard 1 Scoreboard 2

New Zealand; 112/7 (20 overs)	v	Pakistan; 117/0 (7.2 overs)
Marquele McCaskill 27 (47); Muhammad Jamil 2/11 (3 overs)		Badar Munir 92* (35)

Pakistan won by 10 wickets
Delhi Siri Fort

- Pakistan won the toss and elected to field

=== 2nd Match ===
January 30, 2017
10.00 AM Local time (06:00 GMT)
Scoreboard 1 Scoreboard 2

India; 279/5 (20 overs)	v	Bangladesh; 280/7 (20 overs)
Ketan Patel 98 (50); Shahadat Hossein 1/14 (1 over)		Mohamad Hosen 101 (32); Deepak Malik 2/20 (2 overs)

Bangladesh won by 3 wickets
Delhi IIT Ground

- India won the toss and elected to bat

== Round 2 ==
=== 3rd Match ===
January 31, 2017
10.00 AM Local time (06:00 GMT)
Scoreboard 1 Scoreboard 2

India; 305/5 (20 overs)	v	(Cricket West Indies) West Indies; 165/5 (7.2 overs)
Sunil 113* (49); Canil Graham 1/10 (1 over)		Dennal Shim 40 (34); Deepak Malik 1/12 (2 overs)

India won by 142 runs
Nahar Singh Stadium, Faridabad

- West Indies won the toss and elected to field

=== 4th Match ===
January 31, 2017
10.00 AM Local time (06:00 GMT)
Scoreboard 1 Scoreboard 2

Pakistan; 296/4 (20 overs)	v	England; 199/6 (20 overs)
Muhammad Akram 105 (47); Matthew Dean 1/19 (1 over)		Peter Blueitt 71* (41); Badar Munir 2/18 (4 overs)

Pakistan won by 97 runs
Delhi Siri Fort

- England won the toss and elected to field

=== 5th Match ===
January 31, 2017
10.00 AM Local time (06:00 GMT)
Scoreboard 1 Scoreboard 2

Nepal; 143/8 (20 overs)	v	Australia; 145/0 (12.4 overs)
Sunil Chhetri 34* (36); Mark Haskett 2/19 (4 overs)		Matthew Cameron 68* (43)

Australia won by 10 wickets
Delhi Dwaraka DDA

- Nepal won the toss and elected to bat

=== 6th Match ===
January 31, 2017
10.00 AM Local time (06:00 GMT)
Scoreboard 1 Scoreboard 2

Bangladesh; 223/3 (20 overs)	v	South Africa; 151/5 (20 overs)
Mohammed Abdul Malek 90(64); Asher Jonathan Hattingh 1/32 (4 overs)		Ephraim Mathabo 47(53); Mohammad Mahmud Rashid 1/20 (3 overs)

Bangladesh won by 72 runs
Delhi Saket DDA

- Bangladesh won the toss and elected to bat

=== 7th Match ===
January 31, 2017
10.00 AM Local time (06:00 GMT)
Scoreboard 1 Scoreboard 2

Sri Lanka; 334/0 (20 overs)	v	New Zealand; 120/7 (20 overs)
Ruwan Wasantha 170* (69)		Marquele McCaskill 30 (37); Saman Kumara 1/18 (4 overs)

Sri Lanka won by 214 runs
Delhi IIT Ground

- Sri Lanka won the toss and elected to bat
- Suranga Sampath and Ruwan Wasantha (SL) set the record for the highest ever partnership for any wicket in Blind T20 history(334*)

== Round 3 ==
=== 8th Match ===
February 1, 2017
10.00 AM Local time (06:00 GMT)
Scoreboard 1 Scoreboard 2

South Africa; 174 (19.3 overs)	v	Australia; 175/3 (15.4 overs)

Australia won by 7 wickets
Delhi Dwaraka DDA

- No toss

=== 9th Match ===
February 1, 2017
10.00 AM Local time (06:00 GMT)
Scoreboard 1 Scoreboard 2

India; 204/5 (20 overs)	v	Pakistan; 205/5 (15.4 overs)

Pakistan won by 5 wickets
Delhi Feroz Shah Kotla

- India won the toss and elected to bat

=== 10th Match ===
February 1, 2017
10.00 AM Local time (06:00 GMT)
Scoreboard 1 Scoreboard 2

Bangladesh; 203/2 (20 overs)	v	Nepal; 144/8 (20 overs)

Bangladesh won by 59 runs
Delhi Saket DDA

- No toss

=== 11th Match ===
February 1, 2017
10.00 AM Local time (06:00 GMT)
Scoreboard 1 2

Sri Lanka; 281/2 (20 overs)	v	(Cricket West Indies) West Indies; 151/8 (20 overs)

Sri Lanka won by 130 runs
Delhi IIT Ground

- West Indies won the toss and elected to field

=== 12th Match ===
February 1, 2017
10.00 AM Local time (06:00 GMT)
Scoreboard 1 Scoreboard 2

New Zealand; 128/9 (20 overs)	v	England; 129/2 (8.2 overs)

England won by 8 wickets
Delhi Siri Fort

- New Zealand won the toss and elected to bat

== Round 4 ==
=== 13th Match ===
February 2, 2017
10.00 AM Local time (06:00 GMT)
Scoreboard 1 Scoreboard 2

New Zealand; 168/1 (20 overs)	v	Australia; 172/2 (10 overs)

Australia won by 8 wickets
Delhi Dwaraka DDA

- New Zealand won the toss and elected to bat

=== 14th Match ===
February 2, 2017
10.00 AM Local time (06:00 GMT)
Scoreboard 1 Scoreboard 2

Sri Lanka; 164/7 (20 overs)	v	Pakistan; 165/5 (17.5 overs)

Pakistan won by 5 wickets
Delhi Siri Fort

- Sri Lanka won the toss and elected to bat

=== 15th Match ===
February 2, 2017
10.00 AM Local time (06:00 GMT)
Scoreboard 1 Scoreboard 2

England; 158 (19.4 overs)	v	India; 159/0 (11 overs)

India won by 10 wickets
Delhi Siri Fort

- England won the toss and elected to bat

=== 16th Match ===
February 2, 2017
10.00 AM Local time (06:00 GMT)
Scoreboard 1 Scoreboard 2

South Africa; 146/5 (20 overs)	v	Nepal; 149/4 (17.3 overs)

Nepal won by 6 wickets
Delhi Siri Fort

- Nepal won the toss and elected to field

=== 17th Match ===
February 2, 2017
10.00 AM Local time (06:00 GMT)
Scoreboard 1 Scoreboard 2

(Cricket West Indies) West Indies; 195/6 (20 overs)	v	Bangladesh; 196/2 (19.4 overs)

Bangladesh won by 8 wickets
Delhi Siri Fort

- West Indies won the toss and elected to bat

== Round 5 ==
=== 18th Match ===
February 3, 2017
10.00 AM Local time (06:00 GMT)
Scoreboard 1 Scoreboard 2

South Africa; 157/8 (20 overs)	v	India; 158/1 (13.5 overs)

India won by 9 wickets
Bandra Kurla Complex Ground

- South Africa won the toss and elected to bat

=== 19th Match ===
February 3, 2017
10.00 AM Local time (06:00 GMT)
Scoreboard 1 Scoreboard 2

Nepal; 116/8 (20 overs)	v	Pakistan; 117/0 (7.5 overs)

Pakistan won by 10 wickets
Delhi Dwaraka DDA Ground

- South Africa won the toss and elected to bat

=== 20th Match ===
February 3, 2017
10.00 AM Local time (06:00 GMT)
Scoreboard 1 Scoreboard 2

Bangladesh; 330/2 (20 overs)	v	New Zealand; 240/9 (20 overs)

Bangladesh won by 90 runs
Delhi Dwaraka DDA Ground

- South Africa won the toss and elected to bat

=== 21st Match ===
February 3, 2017
10.00 AM Local time (06:00 GMT)
Scoreboard 1 Scoreboard 2

Sri Lanka; 307/1 (20 overs)	v	England; 204/7 (20 overs)

Sri Lanka won by 103 runs
Sardar Vallabhbhai Patel Stadium, Ahmedabad

- England won the toss and elected to field first

=== 22nd Match ===
February 3, 2017
1.30 PM Local time (06:00 GMT)
Scoreboard 1 Scoreboard 2

(Cricket West Indies) West Indies; 229/5 (20 overs)	v	Australia; 136/2 (10 overs)

Australia won by 8 wickets (D/L)
Bandra Kurla Complex Ground

- Australia won the toss and elected to field first

== Round 6 ==
=== 23rd Match ===
February 4, 2017
9.00 AM Local time (06:00 GMT)
Scoreboard 1 Scoreboard 2

Bangladesh; 210/2 (20 overs)	v	Australia; 201/5 (20 overs)

Bangladesh won by 9 runs
Bandra Kurla Complex Ground

- Australia won the toss and elected to field

=== 24th Match ===
February 4, 2017
9.00 AM Local time (06:00 GMT)
Scoreboard 1 Scoreboard 2

(Cricket West Indies) West Indies; 208/7 (20 overs)	v	Nepal; 165/3 (20 overs)

West Indies won by 43 runs
MIG Cricket Club, Bandra (East)

- Nepal won the toss and elected to field

=== 25th Match ===
February 4, 2017
10.00 AM Local time (06:00 GMT)
Scoreboard 1 Scoreboard 2

Sri Lanka; 186/8 (20 overs)	v	India; 187/1 (13.3 overs)

India won by 9 wickets
Sardar Vallabhbhai Patel Stadium, Ahmedabad

- India won the toss and elected to field

=== 26th Match ===
February 4, 2017
1.30PM Local time (06:00 GMT)
Scoreboard 1 Scoreboard 2

England; 257/8 (20 overs)	v	South Africa; 214/4 (20 overs)

England won by 43 runs
Sardar Vallabhbhai Patel Stadium, Ahmedabad

- England won the toss and elected to bat

== Semifinals ==
=== Semifinal 1 ===
February 10, 2017
10.00 AM Local time (06:00 GMT)
Scoreboard 1 Scoreboard 2

Sri Lanka; 174 (19.2 overs)	v	India; 175/0 (20 overs)

India won by 10 wickets
Lal Bahadur Shastri Stadium

- India won the toss and elected to field
- India qualified for the final

=== Semifinal 2 ===
February 11, 2017
10.00 AM Local time (06:00 GMT)
Scoreboard 1 Scoreboard 2

Pakistan; 309/1 (20 overs)	v	England; 162/7 (20 overs)

Pakistan won by 147 runs
Karnataka State Cricket Association Ground

- Pakistan won the toss and elected to bat
- Pakistan qualified for the final

== Final ==
February 12, 2017
10.00 AM Local time (06:00 GMT)
Scoreboard 1 Scoreboard 2

Pakistan; 197/8 (20 overs)	v	India; 200/1 (20 overs)

India won by 9 wickets
M Chinnaswamy Stadium

- India won the toss and elected to field
- India became the first team to win 2 Blind T20 World Cup titles

== See also ==
- Blind cricket
- 2024 Blind T20 World Cup
