= Muhammad Akram (blind cricketer) =

Pakistani blind cricketer

Muhammad Ahmed Akram is a Pakistani blind cricketer, was on 10 September, 1974 in Islamabad, who has represented his country in the inaugural edition of the 2012 Blind T20 World Cup where his team ended up as runner-up. During that world cup, he set the world record for the highest ever individual score by any blind cricketer in a T20I as well as in Blind T20 World Cup history(264)
