= Pakistan national blind cricket team =

Pakistan blind cricket team
- Pakistan national flag
- Association: Pakistan Blind Cricket Council

Personnel
- Captain: Nisar Ali

The Pakistan blind cricket team is the national blind cricket team of Pakistan. Running and organised by the Pakistan Blind Cricket Council (PBCC) which is affiliated with the World Blind Cricket Council (WBCC). The team participates in One Day International and Twenty20 International cricket matches.

== Tournament History ==
=== 40 Over Blind Cricket World Cup ===
1. 1998 Blind Cricket World Cup – (silver) runners-up
2. 2002 Blind Cricket World Cup – (gold) Champions
3. 2006 Blind Cricket World Cup – (gold) Champions
4. 2014 Blind Cricket World Cup – (silver) runners-up

=== Blind T20 World Cup ===
1. 2012 Blind World T20 – (silver) runners-up
2. 2017 Blind World T20 – (silver) runners-up
3. 2024 Blind World T20 – (gold) Champions

=== Blind T20 Asia Cup ===
1. 2015 – (silver) runners-up

=== IBSA World Games ===
1. 2023 IBSA World Games – (gold) Champions

== Key Milestone ==
Pakistan and South Africa played in the inaugural Blind cricket test match in 2000 and Pakistan recorded a 94 run victory over them.

== Current squad ==
Below is the list of current squad with their position category.

- Ali Murtaza – B2
- Amir Ishfaq – B2
- Anees Javed – B2
- Arfan Majeed – B2
- Gulab Khan – B1
- Iftikhar Hussain – B3
- Masood Jan – B2
- Muhammad Akram – B3
- Muhammad Ayaz – B1
- Muhammad Idrees Saleem – B1
- Muhammad Jameel (vice-captain) – B3
- Muhammad Waqas – B1
- Muhammad Zafar – B1
- Muhammad Zohaib Ghafoor – B3
- Nisar Ali – B2
- Tahir Ali – B3
- Zeeshan Abbasi (captain) – B2

== World Records ==
- Pakistan has the record for the highest ever total in Blind T20I history as well as the highest ever Blind T20 World Cup total when they scored 373/4 against the West Indies during the 2017 Blind World T20.
- Pakistan also set the highest ever team total in 40 overs blind cricket against Australia (563/4) at the 2018 Blind Cricket World Cup. In fact, Pakistan's 563/4 is also the highest ever team total in Blind Cricket World Cup history.
- Pakistan is the only team which was able to qualify for the finals in every editions of the Blind Cricket World Cup.
- Masood Jan of Pakistan set the Guinness World Record for the highest ever individual score in a Blind Cricket World Cup match (262*) during the inaugural Blind Cricket World Cup in 1998 against the eventual winners South Africa.
- Muhammad Akram set the highest individual score in a Blind T20I innings(264) which is also the record in the history of Blind T20 World Cup.

== Achievements in Brief: (Pakistan Blind Cricket Council) ==
- Pakistan Blind Cricket team emerged as Runners-up in the inaugural Twenty-20 Blind Cricket World Cup Dec 2012 and then in 2017
- Pakistan Blind Cricket team reached in the final of all the three editions of Blind Cricket World Cups (One-Day Cricket)and won the last two World Cups consecutively.
- Pakistan won 11 International series out of played 13.
- Pakistan Blind Cricket team remained undefeated for five (5) consecutive years in one-day International Cricket.
- Pakistan holds the record of longest winning streak in International Cricket i.e. consecutively won 27(Twenty seven) one-day International matches.
- Pakistan triumph 7 consecutive one-day series. (Vs India, Australia, South Africa, England (twice), Sri Lanka and Nepal)
- Pakistan consecutively won 6 Twenty-20 series. (Vs the same aforementioned opponents).
- World record highest total of 517 runs in One-Day International set against South Africa.
- World record highest margin victory of 399 runs Vs South Africa.
- World record of highest total successfully chased of 439 runs against England (Sharjah April 2010), which is the highest total successfully chased in any form of cricket.
- World record highest score in T-20 cricket of 274 runs, set against England April 2010.
- World record highest partnership of unbeaten 390 runs.
1. Here is a table on other world records set by Pakistan National Blind Cricket Team

Player	Awards and Achievements	Opponents and Date	
Zeeshan Abbasi	Awarded with Pride of Performance Award by the President of Pakistan	August 2013	
Abdul Razzaq	Awarded with Tamgha-i-Imtiaz by the President of Pakistan	August 2011	
Muhammad Akram	264 runs in T-20 International, The highest score by an individual in Twenty-20 International Cricket	West Indies	Bangalore, India Dec 2012
Masood Jaan	262 runs not out, The highest score by an individual in limited over Cricket (ODI) and entered his name in Guinness Book of World records.	South Africa	Delhi INDIA 1998
Ashraf Bhatti	Fastest Century on 37 Balls in ODI	New Zealand	Delhi INDIA 1998
Abdul Razzaq	Fastest fifty on 17 Balls in ODI	Australia	Delhi INDIA 1998
Amir Ishfaq	Best Bowling figure in ODI's, he took five (5) wickets for 4 runs	New Zealand	Islamabad 2006

== See also ==
- Pakistan national cricket team
- Pakistan national women's cricket team
