= Pakistan Blind Cricket Council =

Governing body for Blind Cricket in Pakistan

- پاکستان بلائنڈ کرکٹ کونسل
- Sport: Blind Cricket
- Jurisdiction: National
- Abbreviation: PBCC
- Founded: 1997; 29 years ago
- Affiliation: World Blind Cricket Council (WBCC); Pakistan Cricket Board (PCB)
- Affiliation date: 1997
- Headquarters: 64-J1 Block, Johar Town, Lahore
- Chairman: Syed Sultan Shah

Official website
- www.pbcc.org.pk
- Other key staff: Maher Yousaf Haroon (General Manager)
- (Pakistan)

Pakistan Blind Cricket Council (PBCC) is the governing body of blind cricket in Pakistan. It was founded in 1997, and is a founding member of the World Blind Cricket Council (WBCC), and a full member of Pakistan Cricket Board (PCB).

It controls and manages all the tours and matches undertaken by Pakistan blind cricket team. It also promotes blind cricket at domestic level, and provides regular rehabilitation to the players.

Syed Sultan Shah is the current Chairman of the PBCC, having been in office since 2009. He also serves as the President of the WBCC.

== History ==
In August 1996, the first International Conference was held for blind cricket in Delhi, India, in which seven countries participated. The World Blind Cricket Council was formed then with Pakistan as one of its founding members.

In May 2018, the PBCC announced the formation of the national women team for the first time. Around a 100 players were registered for the trials ahead of the team's debut series against Nepal.

== Affiliated clubs ==
As of 2017, the following 16 clubs are affiliated with PBCC:

No.	Club name	District	Province
1	Abbottabad Cricket Club of the Blind	Abbottabad District	Khyber Pakhtunkhwa
2	Attock Cricket Club of the Blind	Attock District	Punjab
3	Azad Kashmir Cricket Club of the Blind	Mirpur District	Azad Kashmir
4	Bahawalpur Cricket Club of the Blind	Bahawalpur District	Punjab
5	Faisalabad Cricket Club of the Blind	Faisalabad District	Punjab
6	Gujranwala Cricket Club of the Blind	Gujranwala District	Punjab
7	Hyderabad Cricket Club of the Blind	Hyderabad District	Sindh
8	Islamabad Cricket Club of the Blind	Islamabad	Islamabad Capital Territory
9	Karachi Cricket Club of the Blind	Karachi	Sindh
10	Lahore Cricket Club of the Blind	Lahore District	Punjab
11	Multan Cricket Club of the Blind	Multan District	Punjab
12	Okara Cricket Club of the Blind	Okara District	Punjab
13	Peshawar Cricket Club of the Blind	Peshawar District	Khyber Pakhtunkhwa
14	Quetta Cricket Club of the Blind	Quetta District	Balochistan
15	Sargodha Cricket Club of the Blind	Sargodha District	Punjab
16	Sheikhupura Cricket Club of the Blind	Sheikhupura District	Punjab
