= Australia national blind cricket team =

Australia has a blind cricket team which represents the country. It is organized and run by Blind Cricket Australia. The team participates in One Day Internationals and T20 Internationals. The team also participated in the inaugural Blind Cricket World Cup in 1998 and ended as semifinalists. The team generally participated in every editions of the Blind cricket world cups.

== Tournament History ==
=== 40 Over Blind Cricket World Cup ===
1. 1998 Blind Cricket World Cup-Semifinalists
2. 2002 Blind Cricket World Cup-Semifinalists
3. 2006 Blind Cricket World Cup-Groupstage
4. 2014 Blind Cricket World Cup-Groupstage

=== Blind T20 World Cup ===
1. 2012 Blind World T20-Groupstage
2. 2017 Blind World T20-Groupstage
