= World Blind Cricket Council =

Global governing body of blind cricket

- Abbreviation: WBCC
- Formation: September 1996; 30 years ago
- Founder: George Abraham
- Founded at: Delhi, India
- Headquarters: Bengaluru, Karnataka, India
- President: Syed Sultan Shah
- 1st Vice President: Mahantesh G.K.
- 2nd Vice President: Vacant
- Secretary General: Rajanish Henry
- Website: worldblindcricket.org

World Blind Cricket Council (WBCC) is an administration of blind cricket to manage it at international level. The WBC was established in September 1996 when a meeting held in Delhi, India to promote and control the blind cricket globally. George Abraham is the founding chairman of WBC.

== Full members ==
WBCC has ten full members this time and the list of full members of WBCC is below.

- Australia
- Bangladesh
- England
- India - (CABI)
- Nepal - (CABN)
- New Zealand
- Pakistan - (PBCC)
- South Africa
- Sri Lanka - SLCAVH
- West Indies

== Current office bearers ==
The elections of the Executive Committee of World Blind Cricket (WBC) held on 29 November 2012 in the Annual General Meeting of World Blind Cricket at Moevenpick Hotel Bangalore India. The respective office Bearers of World Blind Cricket were elected for the term of next two years.

1. Syed Sultan Shah (Pakistan); President WBC
2. Mahantesh G.K (India); First Vice President
3. Small Allan (South Africa); Second Vice President
4. Raymond Moxly (Australia); Secretary General
5. Armand Bam (South Africa); Director Technical
6. Peter Sugg (England); Director Finance
7. Rory Field (England); Director Global Development
8. Nagesh S.P (India); Director PR & Fund Raising.

== Committee ==
- Peter Donovan (Chairman)
- Tim Guttridge (Vice Chairman)
- Geoff Smith (Secretary General)
- Alistair Symondsen (Development and Sponsorship)
- Murli Ranganathan (Treasurer)

== Chairmen of WBC ==
- George Abraham (Founder and chairman) 1996 - 2004
- Peter Donovan (Chairman) 2004 – present
