= India national blind cricket team =

India
- Indian national flag
- Association: Cricket Association for the Blind in India

Personnel
- Captain: Ajay Kumar Reddy
- T20I captain: Ajay Kumar Reddy

The India blind cricket team is a national blind cricket team of India. Team India is run and organised by the Cricket Association for the Blind in India (CABI) which is affiliated with the World Blind Cricket Council (WBCC). The team participates in all One Day International and Twenty20 International cricket matches. India beat Pakistan the T20 World Cup in 2012. In 2014 ODI World Cup championship was won by India defeating the two-time winner Pakistan. On 12 February 2017, India defeated Pakistan in the final of T20 World Cup at Bengaluru, India. On 20 January 2018, India again defeated Pakistan in the final of ODI World Cup championship at Sharjah.

== Important milestones ==
=== First T-20 World Cup Cricket Championship for the Blind – 2012 ===
- The first ever T – 20 World Cup Cricket for the Blind was held from 1 to 13 December 2012 in Bangalore.
- Participating countries included Australia, Bangladesh, England, Pakistan, South Africa, West Indies, Sri Lanka, Nepal and India
- The brand ambassador was Shri Sourav Ganguly, former captain of the Indian cricket team
- The title sponsor was State Bank of India
- 36 matches were played between 2–11 December on a league cum knockout basis
- India and Pakistan contested the final on 13 December
- Team India emerged champions

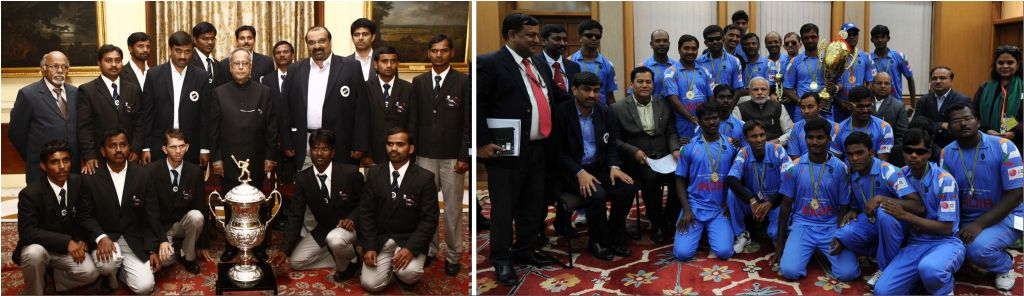
Winner s of T20 world cup 2012

=== Fourth One Day International World Cup Cricket Championship for the Blind – 2014 ===
- The 4th One Day World Cup was held in Cape Town, South Africa, from 27 November to 7 December 2014.
- Participating countries included Sri Lanka, Bangladesh, South Africa, England, and Australia & India.
- The Indian team comprising 17 players from 10 states in India, was led by Captain Shekhar Naik. The youngest player, simply called Golu, from Jharkhand, was 14 years old
- Team India successfully chased the stiff target of 389 runs set by Pakistan, defeating them in a pulsating climax.
- The Indian Team was received at the airport by Shri Ananth Kumar, Minister of Chemicals and & Fertilizers, Shri Thawar Chand Gehlot, Minister of Social Justice & Empowerment and Shri Sarbananda Sonowal, Minister of Youth Affairs and Sports.
- The Prime Minister of India, Shri Narendra Modi, met the team at his official residence. Later in his radio address to the nation titled 'Mann ki baat', he portrayed the members of the blind cricket team as role models.

=== First T20 Asia Cup Cricket Championship for the Blind – 2016 ===
- The first-ever T20 Asia Cup Cricket Championship for the Blind 2016, was held in Kochi, Kerala, India from 17 to 24 January 2016
- Participating countries included India Pakistan, Nepal, Bangladesh, Sri Lanka
- In all, 10 league matches were played between 8 and 22 January 2016
- The top two teams from the league matches, India & Pakistan, contested the finals played on 24 January 2016
- Chasing a massive target of 209 off 20 overs set by India, Pakistan crumbled to defeat with 163 off 18.4 overs
- The Indian team is now the only team to win all three International Championships including the T20 World Cup, ODI World Cup and T20 Asia Cup.
- Congratulatory calls were received by the team from Mr Thawar Chand Gehlot, Minister for Social Justice & Empowerment and Mr Ananth Kumar, Union Minister for Chemicals & Fertilizers

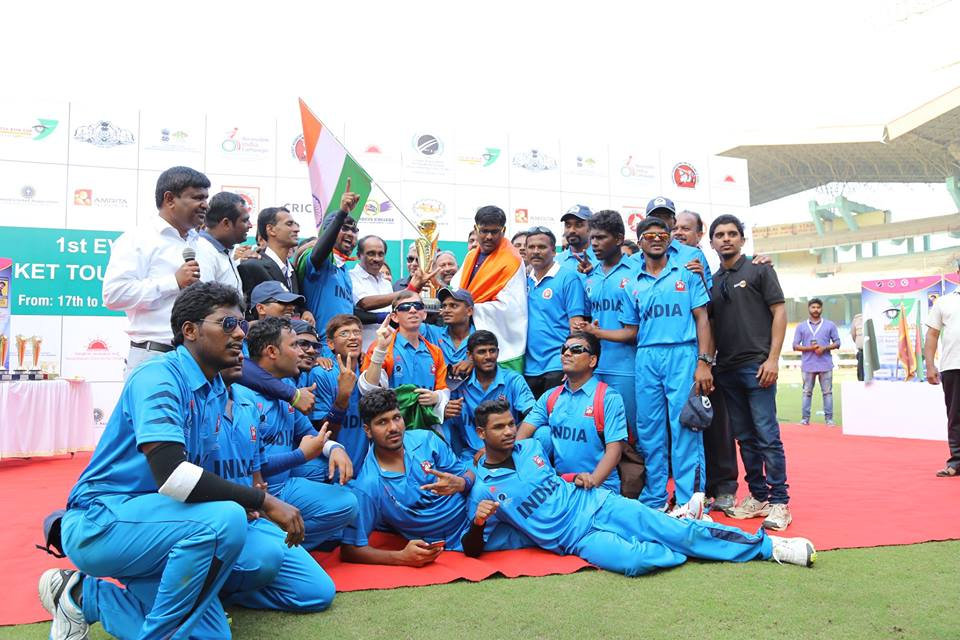

=== Second T20 World Cup Cricket Tournament for the Blind 2017 ===
CABI-Samarthanam is glad to announce the Second T–20 World Cup Cricket Tournament for the Blind which will be organized jointly by Cricket Association for the Blind in India (CABI) in association with Samarthanam from 28 January to 12 February 2017. The hosting rights for the World Cup were conferred to CABI by World Blind Cricket Ltd. (WBC) during the 17th Annual General Meeting of WBC held in Cape Town, South Africa on 25 November 2014.

In T-20 World Cup 2017, all major test-playing countries will be participating. Confirmed participating nations include Australia, Bangladesh, England, Nepal, New Zealand, Pakistan, South Africa, Sri Lanka and West Indies and the host, India. 48 Matches will be played including Semi finals and Finals, on league cum knockout basis in multi cities across India.

A grand opening ceremony will be held with a ceremonial march past by all the participating teams, followed by cultural events, celebrity appearances and dance performances by known artists. Over 40,000 people are expected to be a part of the inaugural ceremony. The event will greatly bolster the game of blind cricket and the cricketers.

=== 2018 Blind Cricket World Cup ===
The 2018 Blind Cricket World Cup was the fifth Blind Cricket World Cup tournament, and was held from 8–20 January 2018 in Pakistan and the United Arab Emirates. In the final, defending champions India defeated Pakistan by 2 wickets to secure their 2nd Blind Cricket World Cup title under the captaincy of Ajay Kumar Reddy. Six teams, Pakistan, India, Sri Lanka, Bangladesh, Australia and Nepal played in the tournament, with Nepal making their first ever appearance.

India played all of their group stage matches of the tournament at neutral venues in the United Arab Emirates, after the foreign ministry of India blocked them from travelling to Pakistan. It was later revealed that the Cricket Association for the Blind in India and Pakistan Blind Cricket Council had agreed to shift the Indian matches to the UAE. Thus, only Nepal and Bangladesh were willing to play matches in Pakistan.

Initially, Pakistan was selected as the main host nation to host the tournament, with the UAE later agreeing to host some of the matches. It was the first time that Pakistan had been selected to host the Blind Cricket World Cup since 2006, and marked the first instance where UAE also had hosted few matches as a part of the World Cup.

Sharjah Cricket Stadium hosted the final between India and Pakistan on 20 January; prior to the World Cup, Pakistan had originally been selected to host the final. India and Pakistan were the only teams to play against each other in the finals of the Blind Cricket World Cup on three consecutive occasions.

In the final, Pakistan batted first and managed to score 308/8 after being put into bat by India. India chased down the target of 309 with 16 balls to spare to clinch the title. India thus maintained their unbeaten record in the tournament.

== See also ==
- India national cricket team
- India national women's cricket team
