= Blind cricket =

Paralympic sport

Characteristics
- Equipment: Auditory Ball, cricket bat, modified wicket (stumps, bails), various protective equipment

Presence
- Olympic: No
- Paralympic: No

Blind cricket is a version of the sport of cricket adapted for blind and partially sighted players. It has been governed by the World Blind Cricket Council (WBCC) since 1996. So far, five Blind World Cups have been held: New Delhi, India (1998); Chennai, India (2002); Islamabad, Pakistan (2006); Cape Town, South Africa (2014); and Sharjah, UAE (2018). In 2012, the first Blind World Cup T20 was held in Bangalore, India. Blind cricket relies on common use of the 'sweep shot', in order to provide maximum chance of the bat hitting the ball.

== History ==
Blind cricket was invented in Melbourne in 1922 by two blind factory workers who improvised the game using a tin can containing rocks. The Victorian Blind Cricket Association was founded shortly after, in 1922, and the first sports ground and clubhouse for blind cricket was built at Kooyong, Melbourne in 1928.

The world's first test cricket match for the blind was played in 2000 between Pakistan and South Africa, in which Pakistan defeated South Africa by 94 runs.

South Africa won the first world championship in 1998, defeating Pakistan in the finals; Pakistan consecutively won the next two championships, defeating South Africa and India in the finals in 2002 and 2006. In 2014, the championship was won by India, defeating the two-time winner Pakistan.

== Rules ==
The rules of blind cricket are based on the standard laws of cricket with some essential modifications.

WBCC international playing rules are codified in 25 clauses, first ratified in 2005.

There are a total number of 11 players in each team: at least four players who are totally blind (classified as B1) and three partially blind players (B2), and up to four partially sighted players (B3).

In terms of playing equipment, the major adaptation is the ball, which is significantly larger than a standard cricket ball and filled with ball bearings to provide audible cues. The size allows partially sighted players to see the ball and the contents allow blind players to hear it. The wicket (stumps) is also larger, made of metal tubes painted in fluorescent colours, to allow partially sighted players to see and blind players to touch it in order to correctly orient themselves when batting or bowling.

Various other modifications to the rules apply. Verbal signals are widely used both by umpires and players: in particular, the bowler must shout 'Play!' as they release the ball. The delivery is required to pitch at least twice when bowled to a completely blind batsman (once when bowled to a partially sighted batsman), but must not be rolling. Totally blind batsmen cannot be out due to being stumped, and must be found to be LBW twice before going out. Totally blind fielders are allowed to take a catch on the bounce.

== World Blind Cricket Council (WBCC) ==
The WBCC was established in 1996 during an international cricket meeting held in New Delhi, India in September 1996. The WBCC was set up with the objective of promoting and administering the game of blind cricket globally. Today the WBCC has 10 full members namely Australia, Bangladesh, England, India, New Zealand, South Africa, Sri Lanka, Pakistan, West Indies and Nepal. George Abraham of India is the founding Chairman of the WBCC. Under his leadership, the inaugural Blind Cricket World Cup was held in New Delhi in November 1998. Seven countries participated.

Peter Donovan of Australia took over as chairman in 2004. In November 2008, George Abraham was re-elected as president of the WBCC.

== Blind Cricket World Cup ==
1998 (Winner South Africa)

The first World Cup Cricket for the blind competition was held in New Delhi, India. The tournament was named & designated as, "Kanishka World Cup Cricket for the Blind", because of the sponsorship by Hotel Kanishka of Ministry of Tourism Government of India, as informed by the then Director Administration, Retd. Lt. Col Sardev Singh from the Indian Army and his daughter Rakhee who was volunteering for this tournament. Further to this, a major portion of the expenses for stay & important events held for all the teams; management /players were borne by Hotel Kanishka. A suite was also provided for meetings & management to work from within the hotel. The match resulted in South Africa winning against Pakistan in the final. India and Australia were the two semi-finalists.

2002 (Winner Pakistan)

The second World Cup was held in Chennai, India in December. Pakistan defeated South Africa in the finals.

2006 (Winner Pakistan)

The third World Cup was held in Islamabad, Pakistan defeated India, under the leadership of Aga Shaukat-Ali, the founder of Pakistan Blind Cricket Council.

2014 (Winner India)

On 7 December 2014, India defeated Pakistan in the final at Cape Town, South Africa.

2018 (Winner India)

On 20 January 2018, India defeated Pakistan in the final at Sharjah.

=== T20 Blind Cricket World Cup ===
2012 winner India

The first T20 Blind Cricket World Cup was held at Aditya Academy Ground in Bangalore, India in 2012. India defeated Pakistan by 29 runs in the final.

2017 winner India

The 2017 Blind World T20 also known as 2017 Blind T20 World Cup was a T20I tournament which was also the second edition of the Blind T20 World Cup for blind cricketers, held in India from 30 January to 12 February. India defeated Pakistan by 9 wickets in the finals to win their second Blind T20 World Cup. Ten teams, hosts India, Pakistan, Sri Lanka, England, Bangladesh, West Indies, South Africa, Nepal, Australia and New Zealand took part, playing in 48 matches.

On 12 February 2017, India defeated Pakistan in the final at Bengaluru, India.

2022 winner India

On 17 December 2022, India defeated Bangladesh at Bengaluru, India.

2024 winner Pakistan

On December 3, 2024, Pakistan has won the Blind T20 World Cup 2024 by beating Bangladesh by 10 wickets in the final match played in Multan, Pakistan. Pakistan achieved the target without losing a single wicket, securing a decisive victory.

=== Women's T20 Blind Cricket World Cup ===
The first Women's T20 Blind Cricket World Cup was held at Colombo, Sri Lanka from November 11 to November 23, 2025. India won the cup by beating Nepal by seven wickets. The tournament featured six teams - India, Nepal, Pakistan, Sri Lanka, Australia and the US - in a single round-robin.

== Regional organizations ==
=== British Blind Sport ===
The founding members of the British Blind Sport organisation were cricketers, and the association is the administrative body for the sport within the United Kingdom.

=== Blind Cricket New South Wales (BCNSW) ===
Blind Cricket New South Wales (BCNSW) is the home of blind cricket in New South Wales.

=== Cricket Association for the Blind in India (CABI) ===
Starting 2011, Cricket Association for the Blind in India (CABI) is in place of Association for Cricket for the Blind India (ACBI) set up in 1996. George Abraham is the founder of the registered voluntary body. Its objectives are to use competitive cricket to teach the blind to look at life positively, gain in confidence and strive to be winners rather than dependents; and to use the game as a medium to transmit the message of ability and talent to the society. The ACBI organised the first two Blind Cricket World Cups in 1998 and 2002.

CABI is the apex body that organizes and conducts cricket for blind across India. CABI is a sports initiative of Samarthanam Trust for the Disabled. It is a registered Non Profit Organization, affiliated to the World Blind Cricket Council (WBCC). Conferred the hosting rights of the First Ever T – 20 World Cup in Bangalore in November /December 2012. The primary goal of CABI:

- To create awareness among the public about the abilities and talent of the visually impaired youngsters through various platforms. Provide chances to exhibit their skills in front of a larger audience.
- Organizing and supervising a regular domestic calendar with coaching camps, tournaments at various levels and conducting bilateral series and overseas tours.
- Create strong network and infrastructure by taking on board active local bodies, blind schools and other bodies, formulate guidelines and supervise.
- Help the local bodies to organize local level tournaments to spot talent, form teams of coaches, physiotherapists, trainers, umpires and other team personnel and oversee them..
- Work steadfastly to get support and affiliation from BCCI and Ministry of Youth Affairs and Sports, Government of India.

=== Pakistan Blind Cricket Council (PBCC) ===
In 1997, Agha Shoukat Ali laid the foundation for the development of cricket for the blind in Pakistan named 'Pakistan Blind Cricket Council' (PBCC). Agha Shoukat Ali, the founder and life and soul of cricket for the blind in Pakistan, also represented the country in August 1996 the first International Conference on Cricket for the Blind which was held in Delhi, India, in which seven countries from all over the World participated. The Pakistan Blind Cricket Council is registered and affiliated with the World Blind Cricket Council (WBCC) and is its permanent member. The PBCC attends all the International Conferences and is playing its part practically.

From 1997 onwards many registered clubs have come into existence and are affiliated with the Pakistan Blind Cricket Council. Cricket is now played regularly in schools among the blind. Tournaments are regularly organized in different cities of the country so that the blind may be able to meet, exchange information and have some fun. Rules similar to 'sighted cricket' are observed for cricket for the blind whenever it is played and efforts are being made to spread this all over the country.

In 2002 Government of Punjab allocated 45 Kanal space for the construction of Cricket stadium and facilities for PBCC. On construction it will be the first Cricket stadium built for Blind Cricketers.

=== Victorian Blind Cricket Association (VBCA) ===
The Victorian Blind Cricket Association (VBCA) is the home of blind cricket in Victoria. Blind cricket was invented in Melbourne in 1922. The world's first sports ground and clubhouse for blind people was developed at Kooyong, Victoria in 1928 and is still used today as the home of the VBCA.

The Association now has four clubs with approximately 70 vision-impaired and blind members and several volunteers.

Current clubs:

- Burwood Blind Cricket Club
- Glenferrie Lions Blind Cricket Club
- Institute Blind Cricket Club
- St. Paul's Blind Cricket Club

The Victorian Blind Cricket Association is located in the Charlie Bradley Pavilion, at the rear of 454 Glenferrie Road, Kooyong VIC 3144 (opposite the Kooyong Tennis Stadium Kooyong Stadium). Games are played on Saturday afternoons from October through to March and spectators are most welcome.

The VBCA provides an important role in the community by developing and providing opportunities for people who are blind or vision impaired to enjoy the recreational and social benefits of cricket. Additionally, the VBCA participates in cricket matches against sighted opposition in keeping with the philosophy of integration and working to remove barriers and isolating influences of having limited vision.

The ongoing aims and objectives of the VBCA are as follows:

- To further promote the game of Blind Cricket in Victoria
- Provides sport, fitness, and physical recreation opportunities for individuals of all ages who are legally blind
- Aims to improve the physical capabilities and self-confidence of individuals who are blind, visually impaired

== Regional competitions ==
=== Australia ===
Blind cricket is widely played in Australia, with teams playing regular fixtures in the states of Queensland, New South Wales, Victoria, South Australia and Western Australia, as well as in the Australian Capital Territory. Every two years State cricket teams meet for the Australian Blind Cricket Championships. The 31st National Blind Cricket Championships was held in Queensland in 2012.

=== England v Australia ===
The first blind cricket "Ashes" competition was held in England in August 2004. Five one-day matches were played, with England winning the Ashes by three games to two. A return series of five matches was held in Sydney, Australia, in December 2008, resulting in a controversial 3–0 victory for England. Australia was victorious in a 2012 contest but England regained the ascendancy in 2016.

=== India ===
Samarthanam Trust for the Disabled & Cricket Association for the Blind in India (CABI) organize state, zonal, national and international level cricket tournaments for the blind. The state level cricket tournaments are organized to select the best state team to participate in their respective zones (north, east, west and south). Zonal matches are held by Samarthanam and CABI by identifying local partners, including private and government bodies which affiliate with the organizers, lending their support to the tournament. The winners of the zonal matches play league matches to qualify for the finals.

=== Pakistan ===
The first regular match for the blind was played in Karachi in 1978 between Lahore and IDA RIEU School, Karachi. During this period several matches were played at school level. The PBCC has organized eight (8) major National Tournaments besides Two Double-Wicket Tournaments since it is established in 1997.

=== South Africa ===
Blind Cricket South Africa (BCSA) is the governing body for blind cricket in South Africa. It was founded in 2008 with the aim of promoting and developing the sport of cricket for the blind and visually impaired in the country.

The organization oversees regional activities throughout the country, including in Gauteng, KwaZulu-Natal, the Western Cape, and the Free State. These regional activities include leagues, tournaments, and training programs for blind and visually impaired cricketers.

Blind cricket in South Africa has grown significantly since the formation of BCSA, with increasing numbers of players and teams participating in regional and national competitions. The organization has also established partnerships with other cricketing bodies, including Cricket South Africa, to further promote the sport.

In addition to its regional activities, BCSA has also participated in international blind cricket tournaments, including the T20 World Cup Cricket for the Blind. The South African national blind cricket team has achieved success in these competitions, reaching the semifinals of the 3rd edition of the T20 World Cup Cricket for the Blind held in India in 2022.

=== United Kingdom ===
Three domestic competitions are run: the two-division BCEW Cricket League, based around single-innings matches played around the country throughout the cricket season; the BBS Primary Club National Knockout Cup, a knockout competition of limited-overs matches; and a Twenty20 format knockout cup competition.

== See also ==
- Deaf cricket
- Women's blind cricket
