= Sri Lanka at the 2012 Summer Paralympics =

- IPC code: SRI
- NPC: National Federation of Sports for the Disabled

in London
- Competitors: 7 in 2 sports
- Medals Ranked 74th: Gold 0 Silver 0 Bronze 1 Total 1

Summer Paralympics appearances (overview)
- 1996; 2000; 2004; 2008; 2012; 2016; 2020; 2024

Sri Lanka competed at the 2012 Summer Paralympics in London, United Kingdom from August 29 to September 9, 2012. Sri Lanka won their first Paralympic medal; Pradeep Sanjaya won the bronze medal in the men's 400 meter sprint.

== Medallists ==
Medal	Name	Sport	Event	Date
Bronze	Pradeep Sanjaya	Athletics	Men's 400m T46	4 September

== Athletics ==
Men’s Track and Road Events

Athlete	Event	Heat		Final	
Athlete	Event	Result	Rank	Result	Rank
Dumeera Pituwala Kankanange	200m T44	26.23	6	did not advance	
Pradeep Sanjaya	200m T46	23.40	7	did not advance	
Pradeep Sanjaya	400m T46	49.92	2 Q	49.28 AS	3rd place, bronze medalist(s)

Men’s Field Events

Athlete	Event	Distance	Rank
Lesly Dobagoda Liyanage	High Jump F42	1.50	7
Lal Pattiwila	High Jump F46	1.80	8
Dumeera Pituwala Kankanange	Long Jump F42-44	5.56	9

Women’s Track and Road Events

Athlete	Event	Heat		Final	
Athlete	Event	Result	Rank	Result	Rank
Amara Lallwala Palliyagurunnans	100m T46	13.96	5	did not advance	
Amara Lallwala Palliyagurunnans	200m T46	29.36	5	did not advance	

== Wheelchair Tennis ==
Athlete	Event	Round of 64	Round of 32	Round of 16	Quarterfinals	Semifinals	Final	
Athlete	Event	Opposition Result	Opposition Result	Opposition Result	Opposition Result	Opposition Result	Opposition Result	Rank
Gamini Dissanayaka Mudiyanselage	Men’s Singles	Cattaneo (FRA); L 4-6, 0-6	did not advance					
Upali Rajakaruna	Men’s Singles	Arzola (ESP); L 1-6, 2-6	did not advance					
Gamini Dissanayaka Mudiyanselage; Upali Rajakaruna Mudiyanselage	Men’s Doubles	—	Miki, Sanada (JPN); L 0-6, 1-6	did not advance				

== See also ==
- Sri Lanka at the 2012 Summer Olympics
