= Kumudu Priyanka =

Sri Lankan Paralympic athlete

Personal information
- Full name: Kumudu Priyanka Dissanayake Mudiyanselage
- National team: Sri Lanka
- Born: 26 March 1988 (age 38)
- Years active: 2006-Present

Sport
- Sport: Para-athletics
- Disability class: T47
- Club: Rehab Lanka Sports Club
Medal record
Women's Athletics
Representing Sri Lanka
World Para Grand Prix
Bronze medal – third place	2021 Dubai	long jump
Asian Para Games
Bronze medal – third place	2018 Jakarta	long jump

Kumudu Priyanka Dissanayake Mudiyanselage (born 26 March 1988) is a Sri Lankan paralympic track and field athlete who is also a current world record holder in women's 200m T45 category. She made her first Paralympic appearance representing Sri Lanka at the 2020 Summer Paralympics.

== Biography ==
She lost both her hands and vision in one of her eyes at the age of 16 due to a hand grenade explosion. She is also current employed at MAS Holdings.

== Career ==
She made her debut in para-athletics during the 2006 Para Athletics National Meet. On 17 December 2010, she set the IPC world record in the women's 200m T45 category with a timing of 28.58 seconds.

She represented Sri Lanka at the 2018 Asian Para Games and claimed a bronze medal in the women's long jump event where he compatriot Amara Indumathi claimed gold medal. Kumudu initially ended up at fourth position in women's long jump final at the 2018 Asian Para Games but she was upgraded to bronze medal position following a doping violation by an Uzbekistani athlete in the same event. She claimed bronze medal in women's long jump event at the 2021 World Para Athletics Grand Prix which was held in Dubai.

She received bipartite invitation from International Paralympic Committee to participate at the Tokyo Paralympics. She was the only female athlete to have represented Sri Lanka at the 2020 Tokyo Paralympics and she was also the only civilian to have qualified to compete for Sri Lanka at the Tokyo Paralympics whereas rest of the athletes were attached to Sri Lankan Army. She became only the second female competitor to represent Sri Lanka at the Paralympics after Amara Indumathi.

She competed in both the women's long jump and women's 100m T47 events at the 2020 Summer Paralympics.
