= Sri Lanka at the 2016 Summer Paralympics =

- IPC code: SRI
- NPC: National Federation of Sports for the Disabled

in Rio de Janeiro
- Competitors: 9 in 3 sports
- Flag bearer: Anil Prasanna Jayalath
- Medals Ranked 76th: Gold 0 Silver 0 Bronze 1 Total 1

Summer Paralympics appearances (overview)
- 1996; 2000; 2004; 2008; 2012; 2016; 2020; 2024

Sri Lanka competed at the 2016 Summer Paralympics in Rio de Janeiro, Brazil, from 7 September to 18 September 2016. The Sri Lankan team consisted of nine athletes in three sports.

Track and field athlete Anil Prasanna Jayalath was the flagbearer for the country during the opening ceremony.

== Disability classifications ==
Every participant at the Paralympics has their disability grouped into one of five disability categories; amputation, the condition may be congenital or sustained through injury or illness; cerebral palsy; wheelchair athletes, there is often overlap between this and other categories; visual impairment, including blindness; Les autres, any physical disability that does not fall strictly under one of the other categories, for example dwarfism or multiple sclerosis. Each Paralympic sport then has its own classifications, dependent upon the specific physical demands of competition. Events are given a code, made of numbers and letters, describing the type of event and classification of the athletes competing. Some sports, such as athletics, divide athletes by both the category and severity of their disabilities, other sports, for example swimming, group competitors from different categories together, the only separation being based on the severity of the disability.

== Medallists ==
Medal	Name	Sport	Event	Date
Bronze	Dinesh Priyantha Herath	Athletics	Men's Javelin F46	13 September

== Archery ==
Sri Lanka has entered one archer.

Athlete	Event	Ranking round		Round of 32	Round of 16	Quarterfinals	Semifinals	Final / BM	
Athlete	Event	Score	Seed	Opposition Score	Opposition Score	Opposition Score	Opposition Score	Opposition Score	Rank
Sampath Bandara Megahamulea	Men's individual recurve open	608	12 Q	Yu (CHN); L 3–7	Did not advance				

== Athletics (track and field) ==
Sri Lanka has qualified five athletes so far.

Men's Track

Athlete	Events	Heat		Final	
Athlete	Events	Time	Rank	Time	Rank
Ajith Hettiarachchi	100 m T43-44	12.11	8	Did not advance	
Ajith Hettiarachchi	200 m T43-44	24.58	6	Did not advance	
Ajith Hettiarachchi	400 m T43-44	55.89	3 Q	56.50	7
Upul Chuladasa	100 m T42	12.76	4 Q	12.85	8
Upul Chuladasa	200 m T42	26.34	4 Q	26.68	8
Anil Yodha Pedige	100 m T42	12.85	3 Q	12.81	6
Anil Yodha Pedige	200 m T42	25.95	4 Q	25.96	7
Upul Chuladasa; Sampath Bandara Megahamulea; Anil Yodha Pedige; Ajith Hettiarachchi	4 × 100 m relay T42-47	—N/a		47.12	4

Men's Field

Athlete	Events	Result	Rank
Anil Yodha Pedige	Long Jump F42	5.61	5
Sampath Hettiarachchi	Javelin F42-44	47.22	12
Gamini Ekanayake	Javelin F46	48.84	9
Dinesh Priyantha Herath	Javelin F46	58.23	3rd place, bronze medalist(s)

Women's Track

Athlete	Events	Heat		Final	
Athlete	Events	Time	Rank	Time	Rank
Amara Indumathi	200 m T45-47	27.55	4 Q	27.54	6
Amara Indumathi	400 m T45-47	1:02.07	3 Q	1:01.74	5

Women's Field

Athlete	Events	Result	Rank
Amara Indumathi	Long Jump F45-47	4.09	12

== Wheelchair tennis ==
Sri Lanka qualified one competitor in the men's single event as a result of a Bipartite Commission Invitation place. The player invited was Upali Rajakaruna.

Athlete	Event	Round of 64	Round of 32	Round of 16	Quarterfinals	Semifinals	Final	
Athlete	Event	Opposition Result	Opposition Result	Opposition Result	Opposition Result	Opposition Result	Opposition Result	Rank
Upali Rajakaruna	Men's Singles	Lee (KOR); W 2–6, 7–6^{(7–5)}, 6–1	Hewett (GBR); L 1–6, 2–6	Did not advance				

== See also ==
- Sri Lanka at the 2016 Summer Olympics
