= Sri Lanka at the 2008 Summer Paralympics =

- IPC code: SRI
- NPC: National Federation of Sports for the Disabled

in Beijing
- Competitors: 6 in 3 sports
- Flag bearer: Sandun Wasana Perera
- Medals: Gold 0 Silver 0 Bronze 0 Total 0

Summer Paralympics appearances (overview)
- 1996; 2000; 2004; 2008; 2012; 2016; 2020; 2024

Sri Lanka sent a delegation to compete at the 2008 Summer Paralympics in Beijing, People's Republic of China.

== Athletics ==
Athlete	Events	Heat		Semifinal		Final	
Athlete	Events	Result	Rank	Result	Rank	Result	Rank
Pattiwila Arachchi	Men's high jump F44/46	—				1.73	10
Shantha Sirimana Arachchillage	Men's 200m T46	23.86	19	did not advance			
Shantha Sirimana Arachchillage	Men's 400m T46	51.08	11	did not advance			
Shantha Sirimana Arachchillage	Men's 800m T46	2:01.20	14	did not advance			
Wijesinghe Adikari	Men's javelin throw F42/44	—				46.30	13
Wijesinghe Adikari	Men's long jump F42/44	—				DNS	

== Powerlifting ==
Athlete	Event	Total Lifted	Rank
Sandun Batapola Mudalige	Men's -48 kg	135.0	8

== Wheelchair tennis ==
Athlete	Event	Round of 64	Round of 32	Round of 16	Quarterfinals	Semifinals	Finals	
Athlete	Event	Opposition Result	Opposition Result	Opposition Result	Opposition Result	Opposition Result	Opposition Result	Rank
Upali Rajakaruna	Men singles	Kammersgaard (DEN); W 6–1, 6–1	Ammerlaan (NED); L 0–6, 0–6	did not advance				

== See also ==
- Sri Lanka at the Paralympics
- Sri Lanka at the 2008 Summer Olympics
