= Sri Lanka at the 2024 Summer Paralympics =

2024 sporting event delegation in Paris

- Flag of Sri Lanka
- IPC code: SRI
- NPC: Sri Lanka National Federation of Sports for the Disabled
- Website: nfsd.wb.gs

in Paris, France August 28, 2024 – September 8, 2024
- Competitors: 8 (7 men and 1 woman) in 3 sports
- Flag bearers: Indika Gamage; Janani Wickramasingha
- Medals Ranked 75th: Gold 0 Silver 1 Bronze 0 Total 1

Summer Paralympics appearances (overview)
- 1996; 2000; 2004; 2008; 2012; 2016; 2020; 2024

Sri Lanka competed at the 2024 Summer Paralympics in Paris, France, from 28 August to 8 September 2024.

== Competitors ==
The following is the list of number of competitors in the Games, including game-eligible alternates in team sports.

| Sport | Men | Women | Total |
|---|---|---|---|
| Athletics | 5 | 1 | 6 |
| Swimming | 1 | 0 | 1 |
| Wheelchair tennis | 1 | 0 | 1 |
| Total | 7 | 1 | 8 |

== Athletics ==
Key

- Note–Ranks given for track events are within the athlete's heat only
- Q = Qualified for the next round
- q = Qualified for the next round as a fastest loser or, in field events, by position without achieving the qualifying target
- DQ = Disqualified
- PR = Paralympic Record
- AR = Area (or continental) Record
- NR = National Record
- SB = Season's Best
- N/A = Round not applicable for the event
- Bye = Athlete not required to compete in round

Track & road events

| Athlete | Event | Heat | | Final | |
| Athlete | Event | Result | Rank | Result | Rank |
|---|---|---|---|---|---|
| Indika Gamage | Men's 100 m T44 | —N/a | | 11.67 SB | 5 |
| Anil Prasanna Jayalath | Men's 100 m T63 | 13.03 | 6 | Did not advance | |
| Pradeep Puwakpitikande | Men's 1500 m T46 | —N/a | | 4:01.84 | 9 |

Field events

| Athlete | Event | Final | |
| Athlete | Event | Result | Rank |
|---|---|---|---|
| Palitha Halgahawela | Men's shot put F63 | 14.51 PB | 5 |
| Dulan Kodithuwakku | Men's javelin throw F64 | 67.03 WR | 2nd place, silver medalist(s) |
| Janani Wickramasingha | Women's long jump T47 | 4.96 | 9 |

== Swimming ==
| Athlete | Event | Heat | | Final | |
| Athlete | Event | Result | Rank | Result | Rank |
|---|---|---|---|---|---|
| Naveed Rasheen | Men's 400 m freestyle S9 | 4:42.71 | 10 | Did not advance | |

== Wheelchair tennis ==
| Athlete | Event | Round of 64 | Round of 32 | Round of 16 | Quarterfinals | Semifinals | Final / BM | |
| Athlete | Event | Opposition Result | Opposition Result | Opposition Result | Opposition Result | Opposition Result | Opposition Result | Rank |
|---|---|---|---|---|---|---|---|---|
| Suresh Dharmasena | Men's singles | J riegler (AUT); W (6–1, 6–3) | G Reid (GBR); L (0–6, 0–6) | Did not advance | | | | |

== See also ==
- Sri Lanka at the 2024 Summer Olympics
- Sri Lanka at the Paralympics
