= Shilaroo Hockey Stadium =

Multi-purpose stadium in Shilaroo, India

- Interactive map of Shilaroo Hockey Stadium
- Full name: Hockey Stadium at Netaji Subhash High Altitude Training Centre
- Location: Netaji Subhash High Altitude Training Centre, Shilaroo, Himachal Pradesh
- Coordinates: 31.202°N 77.423°E
- Owner: Government of Himachal Pradesh
- Operator: Sports Authority of India
- Capacity: 15,000

Construction
- Groundbreaking: 2009
- Built: 2010
- Opened: 2010
- Cost: Rs.3.5 crore.

Tenants
- India men's national field hockey team Himachal Pradesh Hockey Team

Website
- shimlaonline

Shilaroo Hockey Stadium is a multi-purpose stadium in Shilaroo, Himachal Pradesh. The stadium was constructed and maintained by Sports Authority of India and located in Netaji Subhash High Altitude Training Centre, Shilaroo which is 52 km from Shimla.

The stadium is located at an altitude of 8,000 feet and is surrounded by Narkanda and Hatu peak. It is the highest Hockey stadium in the world. The stadium is one of the most modern facilities for hockey like synthetic turf etc. The stadium was opened in 2010 by Sports Minister of India MS Gill.

== See also ==
- Sports Authority of India
- Netaji Subhash High Altitude Training Centre
