= Newsfirst Platinum Awards =

Sports awards

Platinum Awards
- Official title
- Awarded for: Excellence in sport achievements
- Country: Sri Lanka
- Presented by: Capital Maharaja / MTV Channel and MBC Networks
- First award: 30 November 2014
- Final award: 29 March 2019

Platinum Awards (Sinhala: සිරස ප්ලැටිනම් සම්මාන) is an award bestowed to distinguished individuals involved with the sports in Sri Lanka, who lifted the country in local and international level. The award will present in each year by the MTV / MBC Network in collaboration with many sponsors. The first Platinum awards were held in 2014. Platinum Awards, is the first ever sports awards ceremony started in Sri Lanka and thus dubbed “The Oscars of sports awards ceremonies in Sri Lanka”.

== 2014 Platinum Awards ==
The press conference about the launch of the Sports1st Mobitel Platinum Awards Ceremony was held on 26 September 2014. Capital Maharaja news network called News First collaborated with Mobitel Sri Lanka to launch first Platinum Awards in 2014. To educate the people about the ceremony, a promotion vehicle travelled from one village to village by starting the journey from Jaffna on 29 September 2014.

Applications for the Most Popular Sportsperson could be handed over to the promotion vehicle, which closed on October 31, 2014. Over 5,000 applications were received for the 21 award categories at the First Platinum Awards. The Awards night was held on 30 November 2014 at Sirasa Stein Studios, Ratmalana. Sri Lanka national cricket captain Angelo Mathews won the Most Popular Sports Person of The Year Award.

=== Jury panel ===
- Sunil Gunawardena
- Susanthika Jayasinghe
- Julian Bolling
- Dilroy Fernando
- Kishu Gomes
- Hemaka Amarasuriya

=== Award winners ===
- Award for the Most Talented School Cricketer - Tharinda Mendis of Dharmashoka Vidyalaya, Ambalangoda
- Award for the Most Talented School Rugby Player - Omalka Gunaratne of Isipathana College, Colombo
- Award for the Best Outstation School Athlete - Himasha Eashan of Kalutara Vidyalaya
- Award for the Best School Sports Team - Rugby Team of Isipathana College
- Award for the Best Upcoming Sports Woman of the Year - Kimiko Raheem
- Award for the Best Upcoming Sportsman Of The Year - Akila Ravisanka
- Award for the Best University Sportsperson of The Year - Nisansala Weerasinghe
- Award for the Best PTI Teacher Of The Year - A D Nandawathi
- Award for the Best Military Sportsperson of The Year - Yoshitha Rajapaksa
- Award for the Best Comeback Sportsperson of The Year - Anurudha Rathnayake
- Award for the Best Action Sportsperson of the Year (Motor Sports) - Dilantha Malagamuwa
- Award for the Best Para Sportsperson Of The Year - Pradeep Sanjaya
- Award for the Best Coach Of The Year - Srimal Aponsu
- Award for the Best Team Of The Year - Sri Lanka Navy Rugby Team
- Award for the Best Schools Sportswoman of the Year - Machiko Raheem
- Award for the Best School Sportsman of the Year - Shasika Ekanayaka
- Award for the Best Sportswoman of the Year - Chandrika Subashini
- Award for the Best Sportsmen of the Year - Indika Dissanayake
- Award for the Best Woman Cricketer Of The Year - Chamari Atapattu
- Award for the Best Cricketer of the Year - Angelo Mathews
- Lifetime Achievement Award - Arjuna Ranatunga for his contribution to cricket and winning 1996 Cricket World Cup
- Most Popular Sports Person of The Year - Angelo Mathews

== 2016 Platinum Awards ==
The second Platinum ceremony launching started with January 2017, with the full support of the Ministry of Education. Nominations for Platinum Awards 2017 opened under 20 categories. The promotional campaign commenced at Thurstan College, Colombo on 30 January 2017. The campaign was held in every district in the island until the 28 February 2017. The Awards night was held on 31 March 2017 at Sirasa Stein Studios, Ratmalana. Five times world champion in Lamborghini motor racing, Dilantha Malagamuwa won the Most Popular Sports Person of The Year Award.

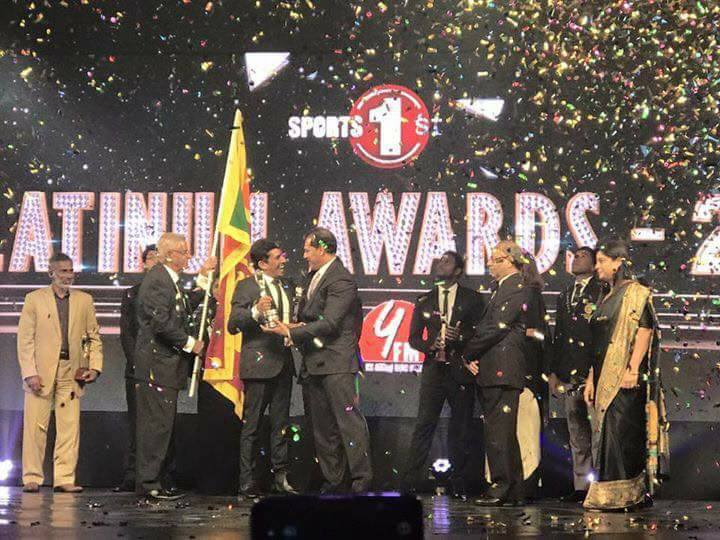
Sports First Platinum awards 2016, "Most Popular Player of the year" awarded to Dilantha Malagamuwa by sports minister of Sri Lanka Dayasiri Jayasekara

=== Jury panel ===
- Damayanthi Darsha
- Sriyani Kulawansa
- Tillakaratne Dilshan
- Julian Bolling
- Arjuna Fernando
- Dilroy Fernando
- Talavou F. Alailima
- Kishu Gomes
- Ruwan Keragala
- Upali Amaratunga

=== Award winners ===
- Award for the Emerging Sportswoman of the Year - Rumeshika Rathnayake of St. Joseph Balika Vidyalaya, Kegalle
- Award for the Emerging Sportman of the Year - Kusal Mendis of Prince of Wales' College, Moratuwa
- Award for the Best School Sports Team - Rugby Team of Isipathana College
- Award for the PTI Teacher Of The Year - Amalka Chandani
- Award for the University Sportsperson of The Year - Sumedha Ranasinghe
- Award for the Para Sportsperson Of The Year - Dinesh Priyantha
- Award for the Action Sportsperson of the Year (Motor Sports) - Dilantha Malagamuwa
- Award for the Military Sportswoman of The Year - Niluka Geethani Rajasekara
- Award for the Military Sportsman of The Year - Himasha Eashan
- Award for the Coach Of The Year - Anuruddha Bandara and Pradeep Nishantha
- Award for the National Team Of The Year - Kandy Sports Club Rugby Team
- Award for the International Team Of The Year - Sri Lanka National Carrom Team
- Award for the Junior Sportswoman of the Year - Hansini Piyumila
- Award for the Junior Sportsman of the Year - Udara Ranasinghe
- Award for the Outstanding Sportswoman of the Year - Kimiko Raheem
- Award for the Outstanding Sportsman of the Year - Matthew Abeysinghe
- Award for the Woman Cricketer Of The Year - Chamari Atapattu
- Award for the Cricketer of the Year - Rangana Herath
- Merit Award - Sri Lanka national blind cricket team
- Medal Honors - Kyle Abeysinghe in Swimming
- Medal Honors - Yamini Dulanjalee in 400M Hurdles
- Medal Honors - Ramudi Samarakoon in Swimming
- Medal Honors - Ruwan Fonseka in Karate
- Medal Honors - Chamil Cooray in Carrom
- Lifetime Achievement Award - Susanthika Jayasinghe for her contribution to athletics and winning silver medal at 2000 Olympics
- Most Popular Sports Person of The Year - Dilantha Malagamuwa

== 2018 Allianz Platinum Awards ==
The press conference of the award ceremony was held on 14 January 2019 at Sports Ministry Race Course. The third Platinum Awards night was held on 29 March 2019 at Sirasa Stein Studios, Ratmalana. 20 awards have been awarded to the excellence in sports across the country and across the world. World Bodybuilding Champion, Lucion Pushparaj won the Most Popular Sports Person of The Year Award.

=== Award winners ===
- Award for the Emerging Sportswoman of the Year - Parami Wasanthi Maristela (athletics)
- Award for the Emerging Sportman of the Year - Akalanka Peiris (swimming)
- Award for the Junior Sportswoman of the Year - Parami Wasanthi Maristela (athletics)
- Award for the Junior Sportsman of the Year - Anura Darshana (athletics)
- Award for the Best School Sports Team - Basketball Team of Royal College, Colombo
- Award for the PTI Teacher Of The Year - Janitha Jayasinghe (Kuliyapitiya Central College)
- Award for the University Sportsperson of The Year - Erandi Dilushika (University of Sri Jayewardenepura)
- Award for the Para Sportsperson Of The Year - Dinesh Priyantha
- Award for the Action Sportsperson of the Year (Motor Sports) - Ashan Silva
- Award for the National Team Of The Year - Kandy Sports Club Rugby Team
- Award for the International Team Of The Year - Sri Lanka national netball team
- Award for the Military Sportswoman of The Year - Dinusha Hansani Gomes (SL Air Force)
- Award for the Military Sportsman of The Year - Indika Dissanayake
- Award for the Coach Of The Year - Pradeep Nishantha (athletics)
- Award for the Woman Cricketer Of The Year - Chamari Atapattu
- Award for the Cricketer of the Year - Dimuth Karunaratne
- Award for the Outstanding Sportswoman of the Year - Anusha Koddithuwakku (Boxing)
- Award for the Outstanding Sportsman of the Year - Indika Dissanayake (Weightlifting)
- Lifetime Achievement Award - Muttiah Muralitharan for his contribution to cricket and record holder for highest wickets in Test and ODI cricket.
- Most Popular Sports Person of The Year - Lucion Pushparaj
