= Dinesh Priyantha =

Sri Lankan Para-Athlete

Dinesh Priyantha Herath
Personal information
- Full name: Herath Mudiyansalage Dinesh Priyantha
- Nationality: Sri Lankan
- Born: 15 July 1986 (age 40) Kagama, Anuradhapura, North Central Province, Sri Lanka
- Military career
- Allegiance: Sri Lanka
- Branch: Sri Lanka Army
- Service years: 2004 – 2008
- Rank: Warrant officer I
- Unit: Gajaba Regiment

Sport
- Country: Sri Lanka
- Sport: Paralympic athletics
- Disability class: T46
- Event: Javelin throw
- Coached by: Pradeep Nishantha

Achievements and titles
- Paralympic finals: 2016 Rio de Janeiro; 2020 Tokyo
- Personal bests: WR 67.79 m (2021)
Medal record
Men's para-athletics
Representing Sri Lanka
Event	1st	2nd	3rd
Paralympic Games	1	0	1
World Championships	0	2	1
Asian Para Games	1	0	0
Total	2	2	2
Paralympic Games
Gold medal – first place	2020 Tokyo	Javelin throw F46
Bronze medal – third place	2016 Rio de Janeiro	Javelin throw F46
World Championships
Silver medal – second place	2017 London	Javelin throw F46
Silver medal – second place	2019 Dubai	Javelin throw F46
Bronze medal – third place	2023 Paris	Javelin throw F46
Asian Para Games
Gold medal – first place	2018 Jakarta	Javelin throw F46

Herath Mudiyansalage Dinesh Priyantha, also simply known as Dinesh Priyantha (born 15 July 1986), is a Sri Lankan Paralympic track and field athlete who competes in javelin T46 events. He also served as an important member for the Sri Lanka Army during the Sri Lankan Civil War. He was disabled after being shot at his left arm during the final stages of the war. He is the defending Paralympic champion in men's javelin throw F46 category. On 30 August 2021, he became the first ever Sri Lankan to win a gold medal at the Paralympics when he won the men's javelin throw F46 category. He is the current Paralympic and World record holder in men's javelin throw for F46 category.

== Biography ==
He was born on 15 July 1986 in Kagama, Anuradhapura as the second child in his family. He attended the Kagama Dathusena Maha Vidyalaya for his primary and secondary education. He underwent hardships during his childhood after losing his father when he was just twelve years old.

== Athletic career ==
He attended the selection trial with the intention to participate at the 2012 Summer Paralympics and secured gold medal in a championship event held in Malaysia. However, he did not qualify for the 2012 Paralympics as he was not included in the world rankings.

=== 2016 Summer Paralympics ===
He represented Sri Lanka at the 2016 Summer Paralympics at the age of 29, which also marked his first Paralympic appearance and won a bronze medal in the men's javelin throw by clearing a distance of 58.23 meters. It was also the second ever Paralympic medal for Sri Lanka after Pradeep Sanjaya who won a bronze medal in the 2012 Paralympic Games. He was the first Sri Lankan Paralympian to win a Paralympic medal in the javelin event. He was also awarded the Best Para Sportsman of the Year at the 2016 Platinum awards, conducted by Newsfirst.

=== World Para Athletics Championships ===
In the 2017 World Para Athletics Championships, he won a silver medal in the javelin event and became the first Sri Lankan to win a silver medal at a World Para Athletics Championships. He also claimed silver medal in men's 46 category at the 2019 World Para Athletics Championships by clearing a distance of 60.59 meters.

=== Asian Para Games ===
He took part at the 2014 Asian Para Games and was placed sixth in the javelin throw event. He was appointed as the captain as well as the flag bearer for Sri Lanka at the 2018 Asian Para Games. During the 2018 Asian Para Games, he set a new Asian Para Games record in javelin throw of 61.84m to secure gold medal in the men's F46 javelin throw event.

=== 2020 Summer Paralympics ===
He was appointed as the flag bearer and captain of the nine member Sri Lankan contingent for the 2020 Summer Paralympics. He clinched historic gold medal in the men's javelin throw F46 category with a new world record of 67.79 m. He claimed Sri Lanka's first ever Paralympic gold medal and also secured Sri Lanka's first medal at the 2020 Tokyo Paralympics. He broke the F46 javelin throw world record which was previously held by India's Devendra Jhajharia when he claimed the gold medal. He also became the first Sri Lankan to win two Paralympic medals as well as the first and only Sri Lankan to have won a gold medal either in Olympics or Paralympics.

== Army career ==
Herath served in the Sri Lankan Army Personnel, as a Corporal in the 3rd Gajaba Regiment. He joined the Sri Lankan Army at the age of 18 in 2004. Herath was wounded in Kilinochchi during the final stages of the brutal offensive operations to crush the LTTE on 16 December 2008 and retired from the Army on medical grounds at the age of 22. It was reported that three bullets had pierced his left arm which made him unable to engage in regular activities and was forced to spend his next four years at the Ragama Ranaviru Sevana for his treatment. He later went onto represent the country in sports as he was encouraged to do so by the high-ranking officials of the Gajaba Regiment in 2012. He was also felicitated and rewarded for creating history in the Paralympics event. After winning the Paralympic medal he quoted, having said that it was the Army officers who motivated him to continue the sports after he abandoned it. "I worked hard during the last six months and I saw my family members only four days during the past six months. After the battle injury, it was the Army officers who dragged me for training,".

On 30 August 2021, commander of the Sri Lankan Army Shavendra Silva promoted him as Warrant officer 1 with the approval of the Sri Lankan president Gotabaya Rajapaksa and secretary to the minister of defense Kamal Gunaratne following his gold medal triumph at the 2020 Summer Paralympics.

== See also ==
- Sri Lanka at the Paralympics
- 2016 Summer Paralympics medal table
- 2020 Summer Paralympics medal table
