= Lakshmibai National College of Physical Education =

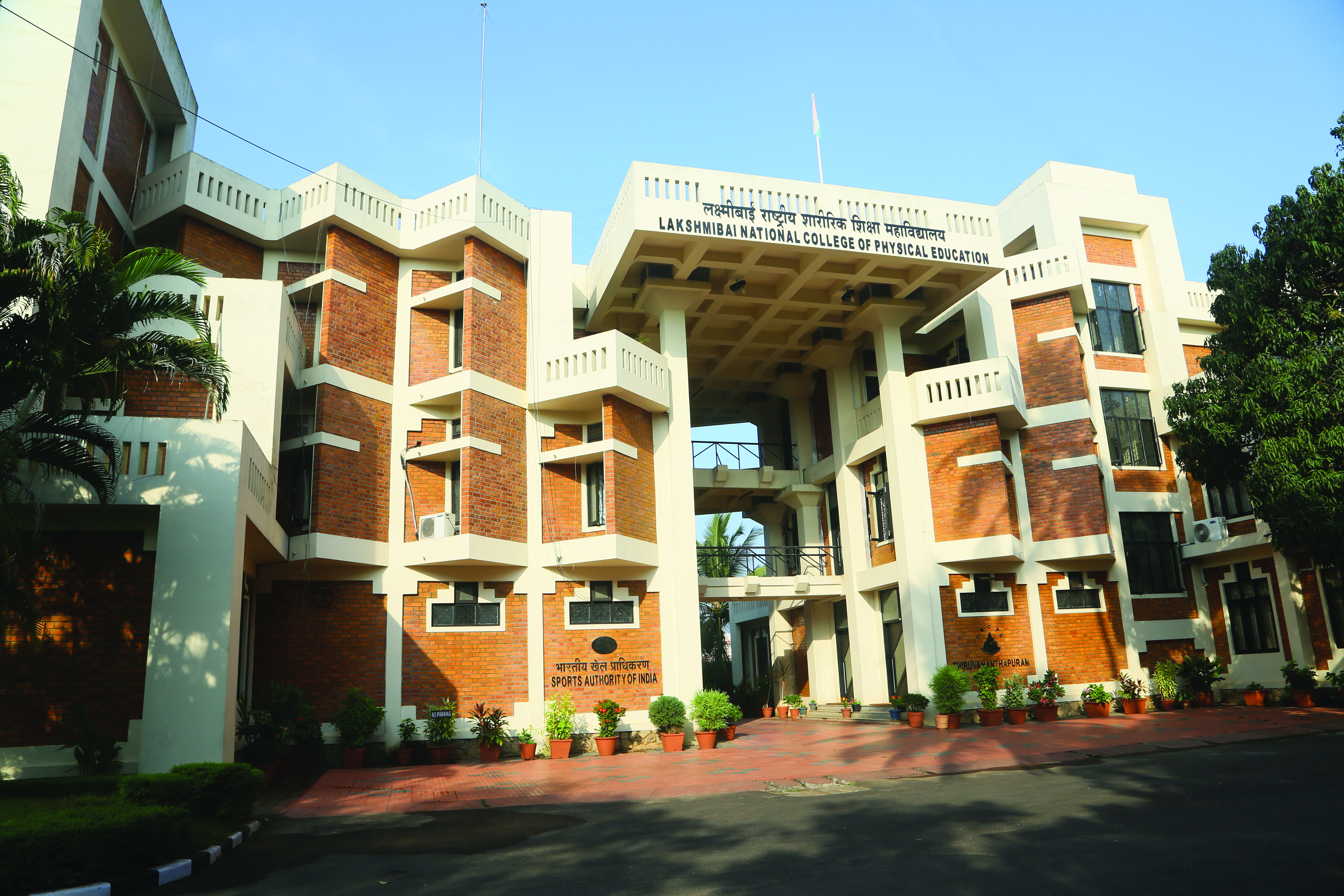
- LNPCE Trivandrum
- Established: 17 August 1985; 40 years ago
- Affiliations: University of Kerala
- Location: Kariavattom, Thiruvananthapuram, Kerala, India; 8.5728°N 76.8895°E
- Language: English
- Website: lncpe.gov.in

Lakshmibai National College of Physical Education (LNCPE) is part of the academic wing of the Sports Authority of India, and is situated at Kariavattom, Thiruvananthapuram, Kerala, India. It was founded on 17 August 1985 under the auspices of the Department of Youth Affairs and Sports, Ministry of Human Resource Development, Government of India.

The college provide facilities for the promotion of physical education, sports and teacher training by offering undergraduate and post-graduate research courses.

LNCPE has served as training camps for Indian athletes competing in various international competitions including the 2022 Asian Games.

== Notable alumni ==
- Chitharesh Natesan, Mr. Universe, 2019

== See also ==
- Sport in India
