= Sri Lanka at the 2020 Summer Paralympics =

- IPC code: SRI
- NPC: National Federation of Sports for the Disabled

in Tokyo, Japan August 25, 2021 – September 6, 2021
- Competitors: 9 in 4 sports
- Flag bearer: Dinesh Priyantha Herath
- Medals: Gold 1 Silver 0 Bronze 1 Total 2

Summer Paralympics appearances (overview)
- 1996; 2000; 2004; 2008; 2012; 2016; 2020; 2024

Sri Lanka competed at the 2020 Summer Paralympics in Tokyo, Japan, from 24 August to 5 September 2021.

Sri Lanka's team consisted of 9 athletes (8 men and 1 woman) competing in four sports.

Dinesh Priyantha Herath clinched an historic gold medal in the men's javelin throw F46 category with a new world record of 67.79 m. He claimed Sri Lanka's first ever Paralympic gold medal and also secured Sri Lanka's first medal at the 2020 Tokyo Paralympics. Herath also served as the country's flagbearer during the opening ceremony.

== Competitors ==
The following is the list of athletes per sport/discipline.

Sport	Men	Women	Total
Archery	1	0	1
Athletics (track and field)	5	1	6
Rowing	1	0	1
Wheelchair tennis	1	0	1
Total	8	1	9

== Medalists ==
Medal	Name	Sport	Event	Date
Gold	Dinesh Priyantha Herath	Athletics	Men's javelin throw F46	30 August
Bronze	Dulan Kodithuwakku	Athletics	Men's javelin throw F64	30 August

== Archery ==
Sri Lanka has entered one archer at Men's Individual Recurve Open.

Athlete	Event	Ranking round		Round of 32	Round of 16	Quarterfinals	Semifinals	Final / BM	
Athlete	Event	Score	Seed	Opposition Score	Opposition Score	Opposition Score	Opposition Score	Opposition Score	Rank
Sampath Bandara	Men's individual recurve open	589	23 Q	Vivek (IND)L 2-6	DNA	DNA	DNA	DNA	DNA

== Athletics ==
Sri Lanka qualified six athletes (five men and one woman).

Track events

Athlete	Event	Heats		Final	
Athlete	Event	Result	Rank	Result	Rank
Saman Subasinghe	Men's 400m T47	51.08	9	did not advance	
Kumudu Dissanayake	Women's 100m T47	13.31	15	did not advance	

Field events

Athlete	Event	Final	
Athlete	Event	Result	Rank
Dinesh Priyantha Herath	Men's javelin throw F46	67.79 WR	1st place, gold medalist(s)
Dulan Kodithuwakku	Men's javelin throw F64	65.61 PB	3rd place, bronze medalist(s)
Chaminda Hetti	Men's javelin throw F64	49.94	9
Palitha Halgahawela	Men's shot put F63	13.40	5
Kumudu Dissanayake	Women's long jump T47	4.92 PB	9

== Rowing ==
Sri Lanka qualified one boat in the men's single sculls events for the games by winning the gold medal at the 2021 FISA Asian & Oceanian Qualification Regatta in Tokyo, Japan. This will mark the country's sport debut at the Paralympics.

Athlete	Event	Heats		Repechage		Final	
Athlete	Event	Time	Rank	Time	Rank	Time	Rank
Mahesh Jayakody	Men's single sculls	12:16.80	6 R	11:21.31	5 FB	13:12.33	12

Qualification Legend: FA=Final A (medal); FB=Final B (non-medal); R=Repechage

== Wheelchair tennis ==
Sri Lanka qualified one player entry for wheelchair tennis. Suresh Dharmasena qualified under the bipartite commission invitation allocation quota.

Athlete	Event	Round of 64	Round of 32	Round of 16	Quarterfinals	Semifinals	Final / BM	
Athlete	Event	Opposition Result	Opposition Result	Opposition Result	Opposition Result	Opposition Result	Opposition Result	Rank
Suresh Dharmasena	Men's singles	Cataldo (CHI); L (3–6, 4–6)	did not advance					33

== See also ==
- Sri Lanka at the 2018 Asian Para Games
- Sri Lanka at the 2020 Summer Olympics
- Sri Lanka at the Paralympics
