= Sports Authority of India =

National sports body of India

Agency overview
- Formed: 1984 (42 years ago)
- Jurisdiction: India
- Headquarters: Jawaharlal Nehru Stadium, Lodi Road, Delhi,
- Annual budget: ▲₹3,062.60 crore (equivalent to ₹38 billion or US$400 million in 2026) (2022–23 FY)
- Agency executives: Mansukh Mandaviya, Minister of Youth Affairs and Sports; Raksha Khadse, Minister of State for Youth Affairs and Sports
- Parent department: Ministry of Youth Affairs and Sports
- Website: sportsauthorityofindia.nic.in/sai_new/

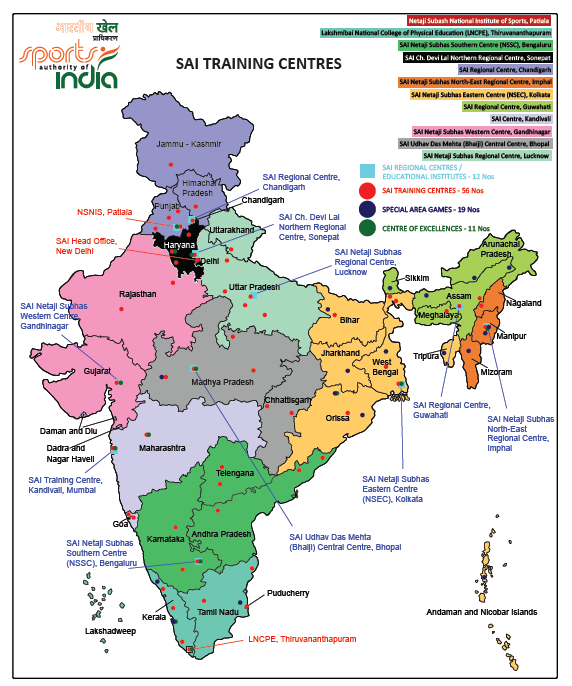
SAI Training centres across India (c. 2014)

The Sports Authority of India, SAI, was set up in 1984 to carry forward the legacy of the 1982 Asian Games held in New Delhi under the Department of Sports. SAl has been entrusted with promoting sport in India and achieving sporting excellence at the national and international level.

SAI, an autonomous body under the Ministry of Youth Affairs and Sports, Government of India, is the Apex National Sports Body of India, for the development of sport in India. SAI has two sports academies, 12 regional centres, 23 national centres of excellence, 67 sports training centres, 30 extension centres of STC and 69 national sports talent content schemes.

In addition, SAI also manages Netaji Subhash High Altitude Training Centre, as well as five stadiums in New Delhi, such as Jawaharlal Nehru Stadium, Indira Gandhi Arena, Major Dhyan Chand National Stadium, SPM Swimming Pool Complex and Dr. Karni Singh Shooting Range.

The two SAI Sports Academies are Netaji Subhas National Institute of Sports in Patiala and Lakshmibai National College of Physical Education in Thiruvananthapuram, conducting research and running certificate to PhD level courses in physical education and sports medicine.

SAI Regional Centres are located at Chandigarh, Zirakpur, Sonipat, Lucknow, Guwahati, Imphal, Kolkata, Bhopal, Bengaluru, Mumbai, and Gandhinagar.

Special Area Games are located at Kargil, Kishanganj, Gidhaur, Ranchi, Namchi, Naharlagun, Kokrajhar, Tinsukia, Imphal, Utlou, Agartala, Aizawl, Bolpur, Jagatpur (Odisha), Sundergarh, Dhar, Port Blair, Alappuzha, Tellicherry, and Mayiladuthurai.

== History ==
On 7 May 1961, the National Institute of Sports (NIS) was set up for the development of sports at the Motibagh Palace grounds in Patiala. On 23 January 1973, it was renamed Netaji Subhas National Institute of Sports (NSNIS).

The Sports Authority of India originated with the committee formed to host the 1982 Asian Games in New Delhi. SAI was set up as a Society registered under Societies Act, 1860 in pursuance of the Resolution No. 1-1/83/SAI dated 25 January 1984 of the Department of Sports, Government of India with the objective of promotion of Sports and Games as detailed in the Resolution. On 1 May 1987, the "Society for National Institute of Physical Education and Sports" (SNIPES) was merged with SAI, and as a result, the Netaji Subhas National Institute of Sports (NSNIS) at Patiala and its allied centres at Bhopal, Bangalore, Kolkata and Gandhinagar, and the Lakshmibai National Institute of Physical Education at Thiruvananthapuram also came under SAI. The Netaji Subhas National Institute of Sports at Patiala and the Lakshmibai National University of Physical Education at Thiruvananthapuram became its academic wings. In 1995, Lakshmibai National University of Physical Education at Gwalior became a separate "Deemed University."

== SAI regional centres (SRC)s ==
Clockwise from north:

- SAI Netaji Subhas Regional Centre, Chandigarh
- SAI Chaudhary Devi Lal Northern Regional Centre, Sonipat
- SAI Netaji Subhas Regional Centre, Lucknow, Uttar Pradesh
- SAI Netaji Subhas North-East Regional Centre, Guwahati
- SAI Netaji Subhas North-East Regional Centre, Imphal
- SAI Netaji Subhas Eastern Centre, Kolkata
- SAI Udhav Das Mehta Bhaiji Central Centre, Bhopal
- SAI Netaji Subhas Southern Centre, Bengaluru
- SAI Regional Centre, Mumbai
- SAI Netaji Subhas Western Centre, Gandhinagar
- SAI Regional Centre, Thiruvananthapuram

== SAI academies ==
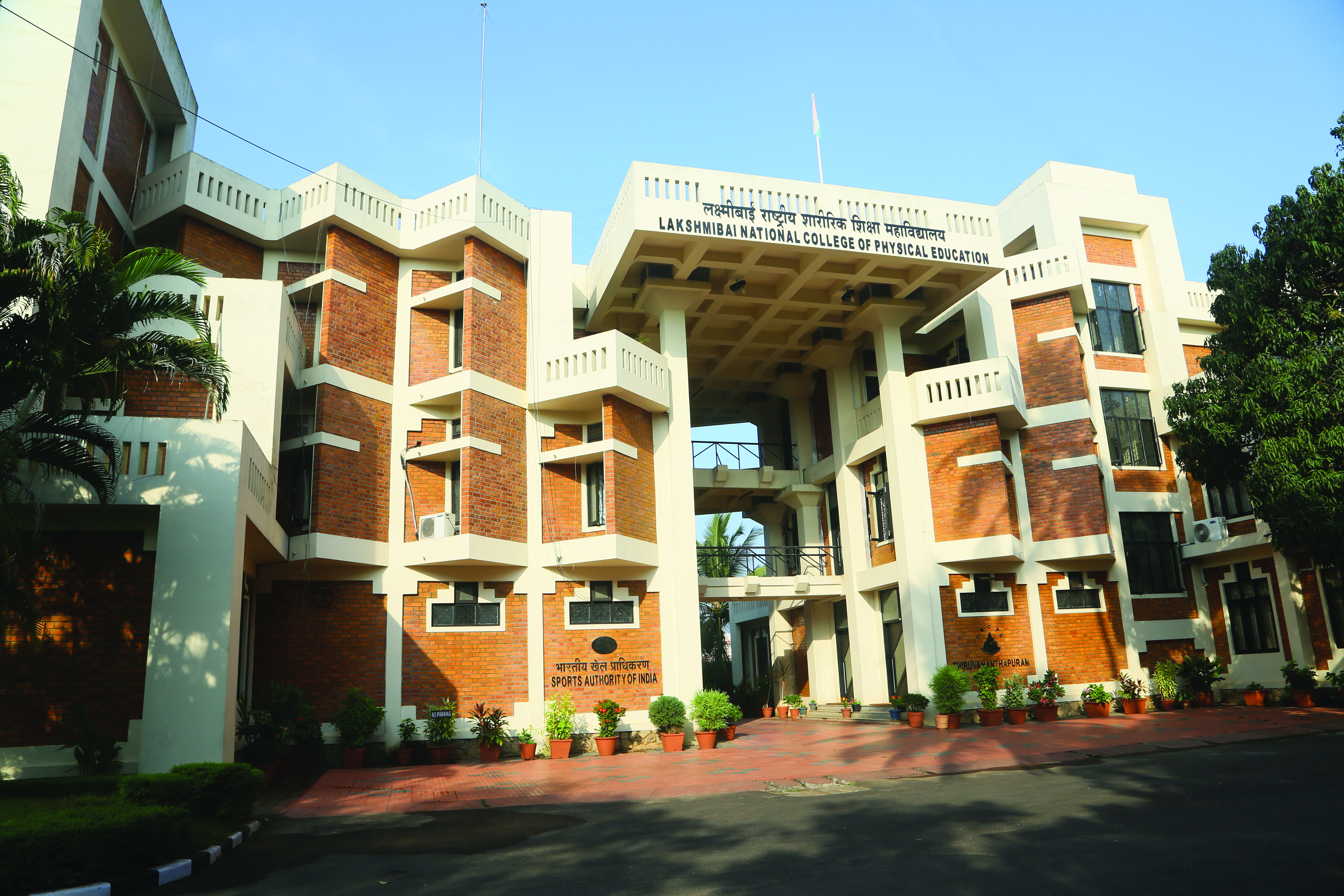
Lakshmibai National College of Physical Education (LNCPE), Thiruvananthapuram

SAI runs following two academic institutes that run graduate and post-graduate courses in sports medicine, sports and physical education to prepare coaches and allied sports support staff.

- Netaji Subhas National Institute of Sports (NSNIS) at Patiala
  - Refresher Courses
  - Certificate Course in Sports Coaching via SAI Regional Centres (SRC)s
  - Diploma in Sports Coaching
  - Post-graduate Diploma Course in Sports medicine
  - Master's degree in Sports Coaching
- Lakshmibai National College of Physical Education (LNCPE) at Thiruvananthapuram
  - Bachelor of Physical Education (BPE)
  - Master of Physical Education (MPE)
  - Doctor of Philosophy (PhD) Regular and Part-time

=== Sports sciences and medicine ===
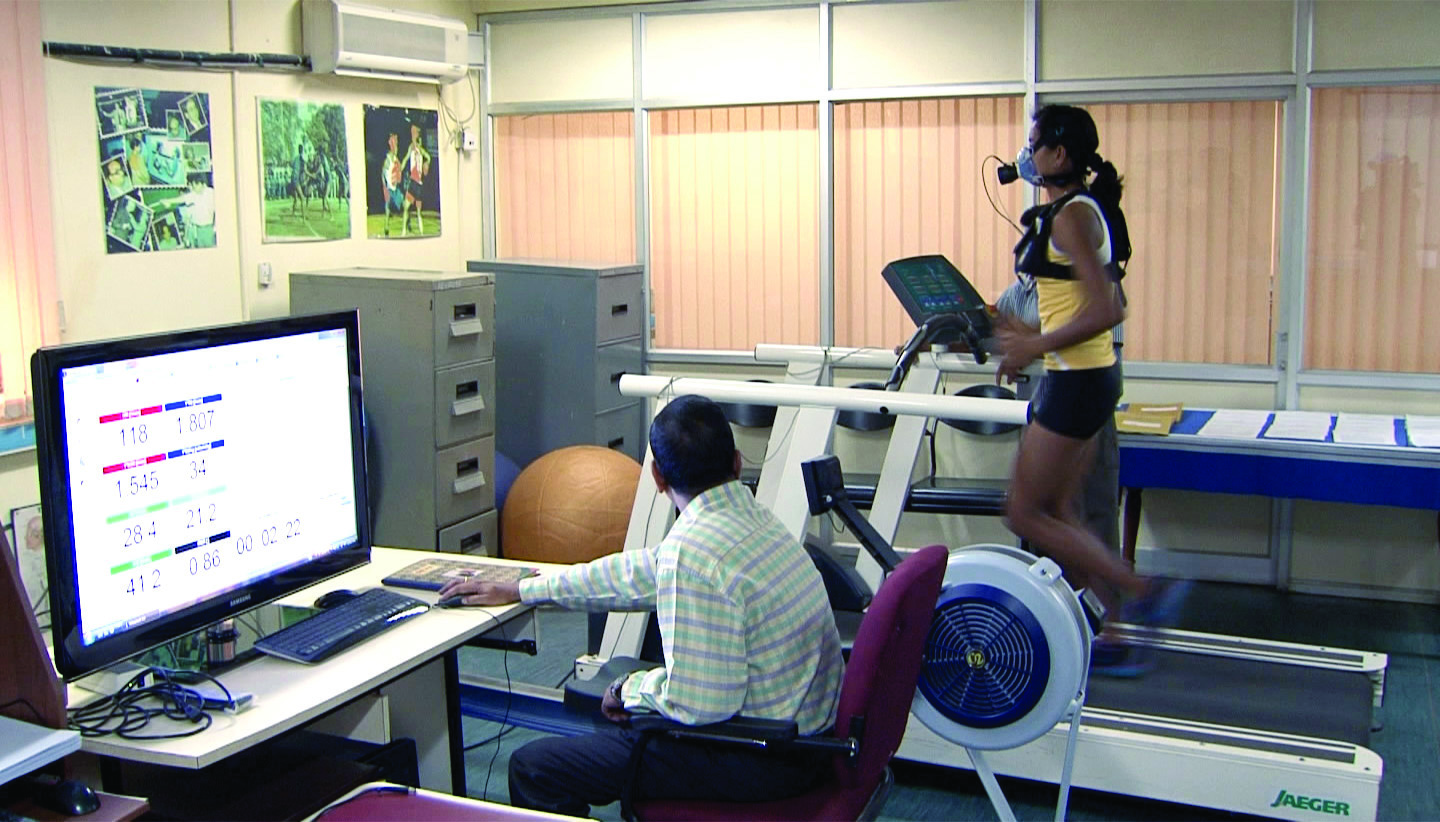
Sports Science Centre (Human Performance Lab)

In 1983, a "Department of Sports Science" was established at "NSNIS Patiala". From 1987 to 1990, "Sports science centres" with "Human Performance Lab" were set up at four regional centres. Basic sports science support staff scheme was implemented for national athletes and SAI schemes for children were introduced at various regional centres.

Sports scientists from the fields of anthropometry, sports biomechanics, sports nutrition, sport psychology, sports physiology, physiotherapy, and physical education (GTMT) undertake the research work to improve the performance of sportspersons. SAI has technical and research collaboration with various reputed Indian and foreign sports science and medical institutes. Doctors, physiotherapists, psychologists, nutritionists, coaches and experts from these friends are also deployed at SAI academies, regional centres, sports training centres and centre of excellences. SPARRC institute and Indian Institute of Sports Medicine recognized by Indian Government aim to provide non-invasive procedures for sorts injuries with advanced research in sports science.

== Training of Elite Athlete Management Support (TEAMS) ==
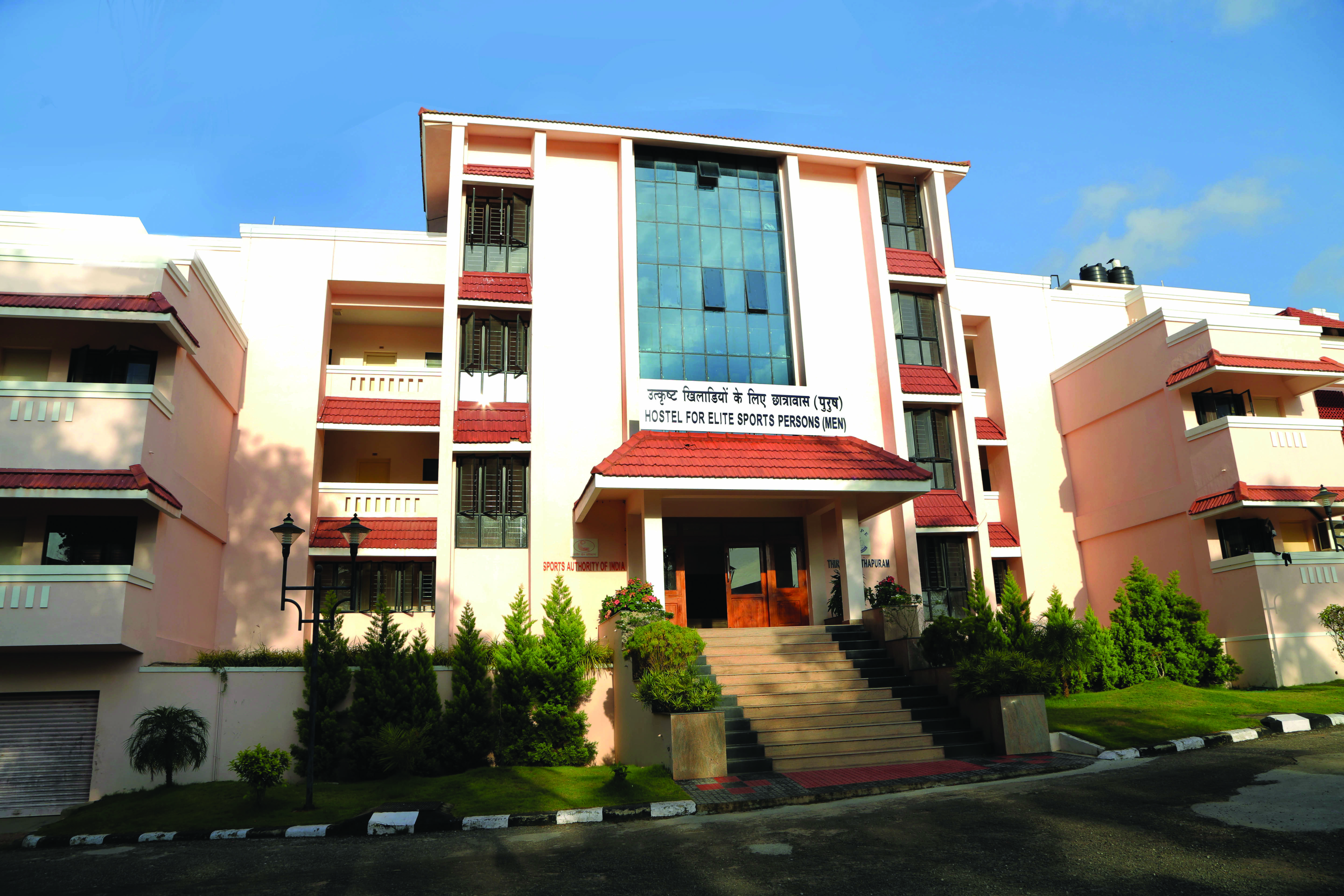
Hostel for elite sportspersons

This is the backbone of SAI which provides support to the National Sports Federations (NSFs) in the preparation of National Teams which participate in various International events. The TEAMS Division coordinates the Long Term Development Plan of each NSF; provides logistics and training support at various academic institutions and other Regional Centres of SAI and also at selected training centres outside SAI. The TEAMS Division draws most of its funding under the Scheme of "Assistance to National Sports Federations" from Sports Ministry. The TEAMS Division also provides support to the NSFs in the hiring of foreign coaches and selection of the national coach for each NSF, who are responsible for the training of core probables for the National teams.

With active support from TEAMS Division, good results have been achieved in the international arena in the disciplines of Badminton, Judo, Shooting, Archery, Athletics, Weightlifting, Wrestling, Wushu, Boxing and Billiards and Snooker.

Under this Scheme of "Assistance to National Sports Federations", financial assistance is provided to recognised NSFs for training and participation of teams in international events abroad, organisation of national and international tournaments in India, coaching and training of national teams under Indian and foreign coaches with requisite technical and scientific support, procurement of equipment, etc.

== Engagement of foreign coaches ==
SAI has constantly engaged with expert foreign coaches on short term and long-term basis to train national coaching campers and facilitate knowledge exchange with Indian coaches.

== National coaching camps ==
In a year, SAI organises a number of national coaching camps in different disciplines in SAI centres and other centres for preparation of Indian teams for various national and international tournaments.

| S.No. | Venue |
|---|---|
| 1. | Jawaharlal Nehru Stadium |
| 2. | Indira Gandhi Arena |
| 3. | Major Dhyan Chand National Stadium |
| 4. | SPM Swimming Pool Complex |
| 5. | Dr. Karni Singh Shooting Range |
| 6. | Netaji Subhas National Institute of Sports |
| 7. | Lakshmibai National College of Physical Education |
| 8. | SAI Water Sports Centre Alappuzha |
| 9. | SAI Netaji Subhas Eastern Centre |
| 10. | SAI Udhav Das Mehta Bhaiji Central Centre |
| 11. | SAI Netaji Subhash Regional Centre Lucknow |
| 12. | SAI Netaji Subhash Western Centre |
| 13. | SAI Netaji Subhash Southern Centre |
| 14. | SAI Chaudhary Devi Lal Northern Regional Centre |
| 15. | SAI Aurangabad Western Centre |
| 16. | SAI Dharamshala Training Centre |
| 17. | Netaji Subhash High Altitude Training Centre |
| 18. | P.T. Usha Academy |
| 19. | Gopichand Badminton Academy |
| 20. | Prakash Padukone Badminton Academy |
| 21. | Netaji Subhas National Institute of Sports |
| 22. | A P Rowing Academy, Hussain Sagar Lake |
| 23. | 23. Sh. Atal Bihari Vajpayee National Centre of Excellence |

== Long Term Development Plan (LTDP) ==
SAI Long Term Development Plan (SAI LTDP) aims at the joint preparation of long term sports-specific development plans by National Sports governing bodies and federations of India (NSFs) based on a four-year cycle with yearly review. The plans cover all aspects of sports including development of sportsperson, coaching, participation, promotion, tournament schedule, hosting of major events and sports sciences.

== SAI schemes ==
Different sports promotion schemes of SAI, aimed at spotting and nurturing talent, are being implemented and monitored through the networks of SAI centres.

| S.No. | Name | Age group |
|---|---|---|
| 1. | National Sports Talent Contest (NSTC) | 8–14 years |
| 2. | Army Boys Sports Companies (ABSC) | 8–14 years |
| 3. | SAI Training Centre (STC) | 12–18 years |
| 4. | Special Area Games (SAG) | 12–18 years |
| 5. | Extension Centres of STCs/SAGs | 12–18 years |
| 6. | Centre of Excellence (COE) | 12–25 years |
| 7. | Come and Play | 8–17 years |
| 8. | Community Connect | Open |

=== National Sports Talent Contest Scheme (NSTC) ===
SAI National Sports Talent Contest Scheme (SAI NSTC) provides the school environment to play and study for talented 8-14 year olds who are at the right age for higher level training in competitive sports.

=== Army Boys Sports Company (ABSC) ===
SAI Army Boys Sports Company (SAI ABSC) is a scheme run in collaboration with the Indian Army to nurture and groom talented boys in the age group of 8 to 14 years. These companies act as virtual sports schools where training is scientifically backed up and support facility is provided throughout the training period. The trainees are entitled to an assured career in the Armed Forces at 17½ years. The selection of trainees is done on the basis of performance and potential assessed through a battery of tests.

=== SAI Training Centers Scheme (STC) ===
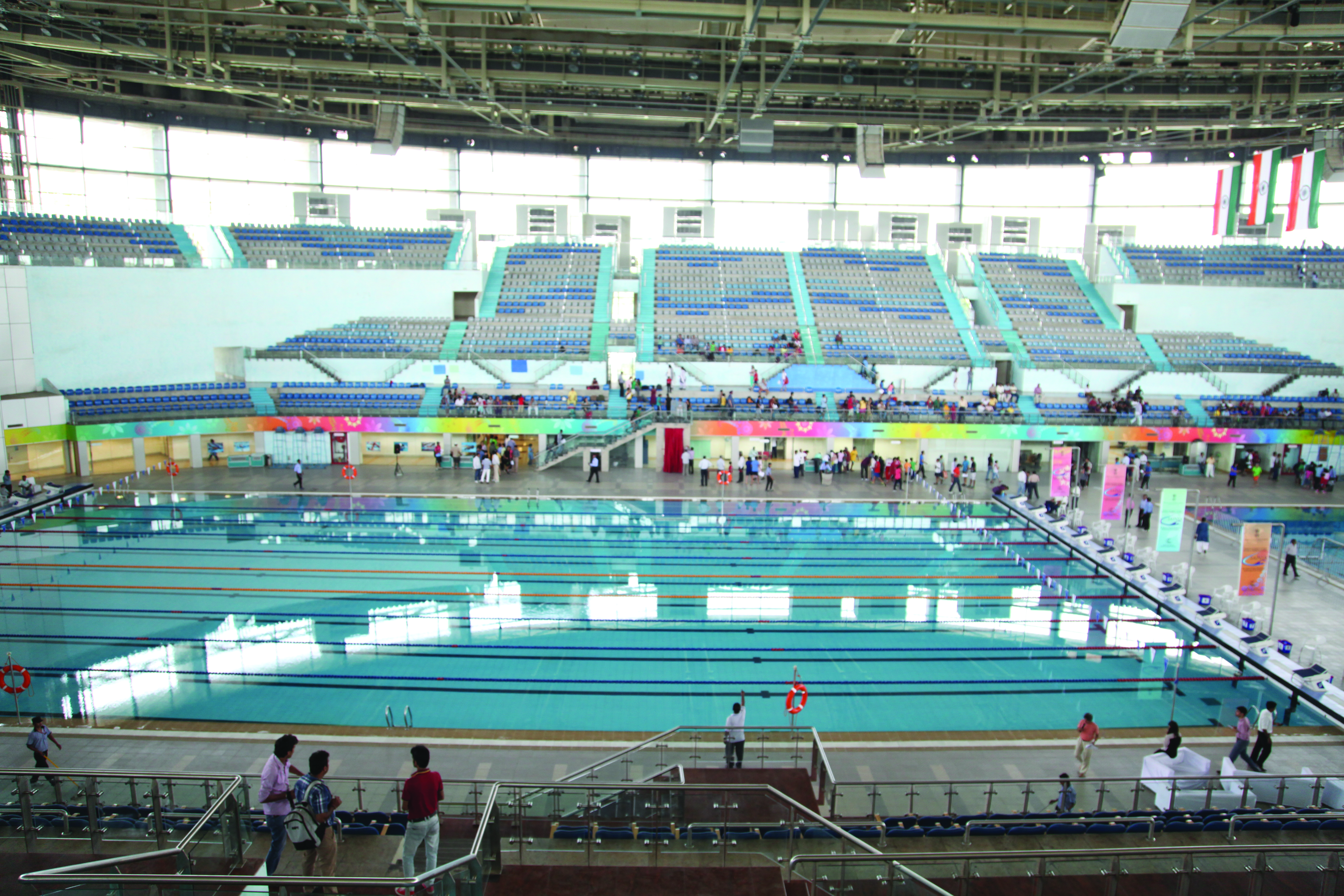
SAI National Swimming Academy at SPM Swimming Pool Complex in Delhi.

SAI Training Centre Scheme (SAI STC) was created in 1995 by merging "Sports Project Development Area Centres" (SPDA) and "Sports Hostel Scheme". It is run in collaboration with the State Government and Union Territory Administrations. The trainees are admitted into the scheme on residential and non-residential basis where they are funded by the government.

=== Come and Play Scheme ===
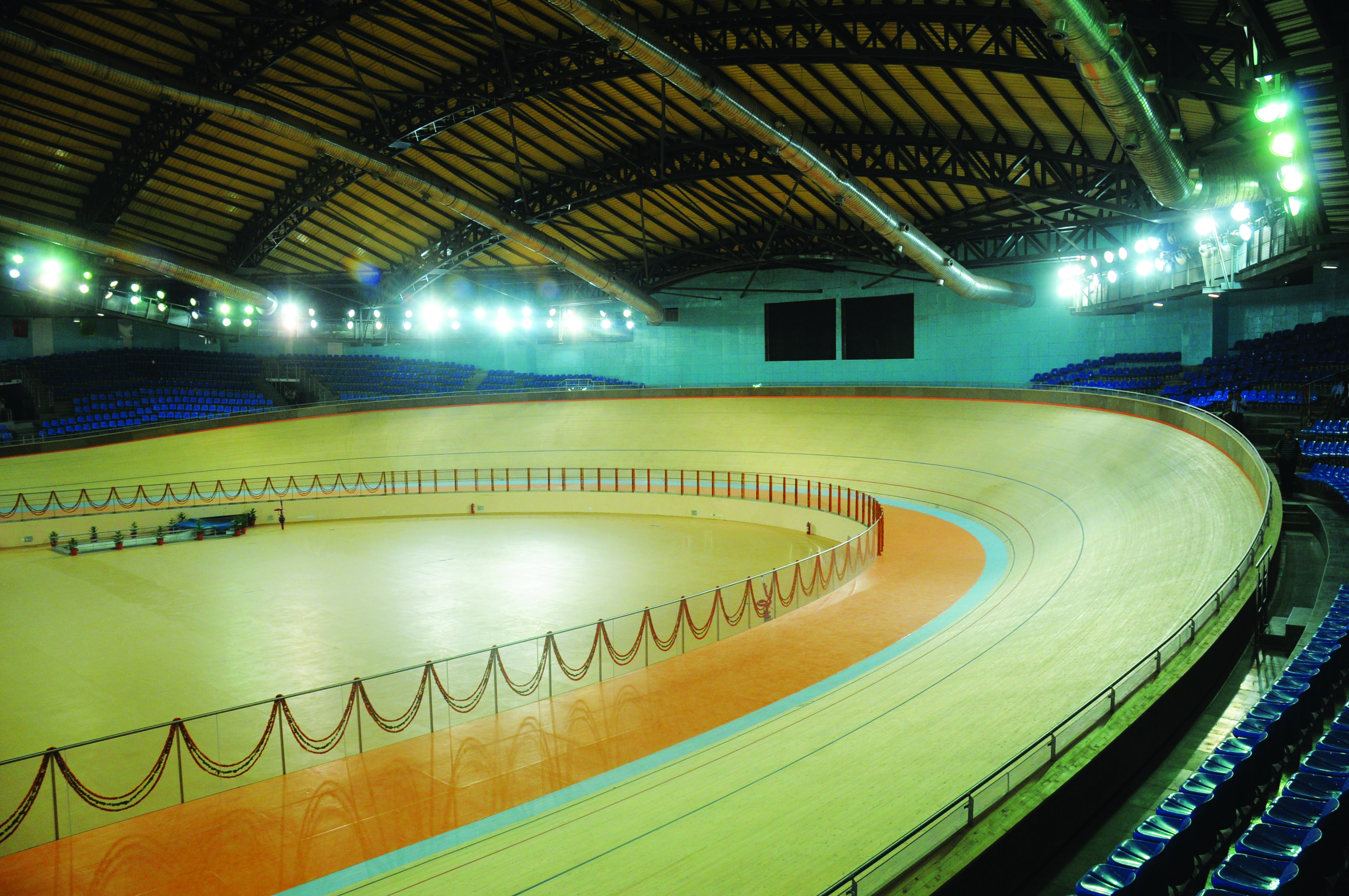
SAI National Cycling Academy (SAINCA) velodrome at Indira Gandhi Sports Complex in Delhi

SAI Come and Play Scheme (SAI CPS) serves the purpose of talent scouting. Meritorious talent emerging from this scheme forms a pool for induction into regular residential and non-residential sports promotional schemes of STC and SAG. The scheme was introduced in May 2011 for optimum utilisation of its five stadia in Delhi by throwing open the designated areas in the SAI Stadia for community sports.

== See also ==
- Major Dhyan Chand Khel Ratna Award
- Lists of sports venues in India
- List of sports events in India
- India sport-related lists
- Sports in Asia
- National Sports Governance Act, 2025
