= Sri Lanka at the 2004 Summer Paralympics =

- IPC code: SRI
- NPC: National Federation of Sports for the Disabled

in Athens
- Competitors: 6 in 4 sports
- Flag bearer: Bandara Thennakoon
- Medals: Gold 0 Silver 0 Bronze 0 Total 0

Summer Paralympics appearances (overview)
- 1996; 2000; 2004; 2008; 2012; 2016; 2020; 2024

Sri Lanka competed at the 2004 Summer Paralympics in Athens, Greece. The team included six athletes, all of them men, and won no medals.

== Sports ==
=== Archery ===
Athlete	Event	Ranking round		Round of 32	Round of 16	Quarterfinals	Semifinals	Finals	
Athlete	Event	Score	Seed	Opposition score	Opposition score	Opposition score	Opposition score	Opposition score	Rank
Rajeeva Wickramasinghe	Men's individual standing	579	13	Gorgabi (IRI); W 140–127	Lezanski (POL); L 147–149	did not advance			

=== Athletics ===
==== Men's field ====
Athlete	Class	Event	Final		
Athlete	Class	Event	Result	Points	Rank
Bandara Thennakoon	F44/46	High jump	1.60	-	10

=== Powerlifting ===
Athlete	Event	Result	Rank
Sadun Wasana Perera	Men's 48kg	NMR	

=== Swimming ===
Athlete	Class	Event	Heats		Final	
Athlete	Class	Event	Result	Rank	Result	Rank
Priyadharshana Kalugala	S10	50m freestyle	27.39	14	did not advance	
Priyadharshana Kalugala	S10	100m backstroke	1:06.55	2 Q	1:06.31	4

=== Wheelchair tennis ===
Athlete	Class	Event	Round of 64	Round of 32	Round of 16	Quarterfinals	Semifinals	Finals
Athlete	Class	Event	Opposition Result	Opposition Result	Opposition Result	Opposition Result	Opposition Result	Opposition Result
Manatunga Kumarasiri	Open	Men's singles	Olsson (SWE); L 1–6, 0–6	did not advance				
Berty Silva	Open	Men's singles	Baumgartner (AUT); L 2–6, 0–6	did not advance				
Berty Silva; Manatunga Kumarasiri	Open	Men's doubles	—N/a	Batycki (POL); Kulik (POL); L 1–6, 1–6	did not advance			

== See also ==
- Sri Lanka at the Paralympics
- Sri Lanka at the 2004 Summer Olympics
