= Sri Lanka at the 1996 Summer Paralympics =

- IPC code: SRI
- NPC: National Federation of Sports for the Disabled

in Atlanta
- Competitors: 1
- Medals: Gold 0 Silver 0 Bronze 0 Total 0

Summer Paralympics appearances (overview)
- 1996; 2000; 2004; 2008; 2012; 2016; 2020; 2024

One male athlete from Sri Lanka competed at the 1996 Summer Paralympics in Atlanta, United States.

== See also ==
- Sri Lanka at the Paralympics
- Sri Lanka at the 1996 Summer Olympics
