= Lucion Pushparaj =

Sri Lankan male IFBB Pro Bodybuilder

- ලූෂන් පුෂ්පරාජ් (Sinhala), லூஷியன் புஷ்பராஜ் (Tamil)
- Professional bodybuilder

Personal info
- Nickname: Black Lion of Asia
- Born: September 10, 1982 (age 44); Ja-Ela, Sri Lanka

Best statistics
- Weight: 100–110 kg (220–240 lb)

Professional (Pro) career
- Pro-debut: 2013 IFBB Pro Championship in Oman; 2013
- Best win: Mr Universe - WBPF World Champion
- Successor: Chitharesh Natesan
- Active: 2012–present
Medal record
Men's Bodybuilding
Representing Sri Lanka
IFBB Arnold Classic Amateur - Super Heavyweight
	2020 Ohio	4th Place
10th WBPF Championship
Gold medal – first place	2018 Thailand	Mr. Universe
IFBB Austrian International Bodybuilding Championship
Silver medal – second place	2018 Austria	2nd Place
IFBB Mr Asia Championship - ABBF
Gold medal – first place	2017 South Korea	Mr. Asia
Silver medal – second place	2014 Colombo	2nd Place
Wawan Classic Expo International
Bronze medal – third place	2016 Kuwait	3rd Place
Oman Weightlifting Championship
Gold medal – first place	2014 Oman	1st Place
Mr. Sri Lanka Contest
Gold medal – first place	2014 Colombo	Mr Sri Lanka
Atlas and Fitness Expo
	2014 Los Angeles	4th Place

Lucion Anton Pushparaj,Tamil: லூசியன் ஆண்டன் புஷ்பராஜ் (born September 10, 1982) also spelled Lucian Pushparaj, nicknamed Black Lion of Asia, is a Sri Lankan male IFBB professional bodybuilder. On 16 December 2018, he became the first Sri Lankan to win the WBPF World Championship title, and was crowned WBPF Mr. Universe.

He is also the first Sri Lankan Bodybuilder to participate in the IFBB Pro Arnold Classic Amateur, where he came in 4th place.

== Early life ==
Pushparaj was born on September 10, 1982, in Ja-Ela. He received his primary education from St. Xavier Maha Vidyalaya, and his secondary education from Basilica College, Ragama. In school, Pushparaj was an active athlete, taking part in athletics, volleyball, cricket, winning at the all-island level.

Subsequently, he became a fitness instructor at various gyms and tried his hand at Pro bodybuilding. Despite the difficulties and discrimination he faced, he managed to fund himself, train and compete.

== Physical statistics ==
- Height: - 5'10"
- Contest weight: - 100 kg
- Off-season weight: - 110 kg
- Chest: - 51" (contest shape)
- Arms: - 19.5" (contest shape)

== Career ==
=== 2012-2013 ===
Lucion is a bodybuilder, who has competed at both national and international levels since receiving his IFBB Pro status in 2012. He participated in his first major international competition in 2013, which was an IFBB Pro Championship in Oman.

=== 2014 ===
Pushparaj won a gold medal in the 2014 Mr. Sri Lanka Contest. Later that year, Pushparaj won a silver medal in the AFBF 48th Asian Championship (IFBB). In 2014, He also participated in the US-based Mr. and Mrs. Atlas and Fitness Expo Contest, becoming the first Sri Lankan to do so, and placed fourth

=== 2016-2018 ===
In 2016, Pushparaj placed first in the Open Weightlifting Championship in Oman (Under 100 kg), and later took third place at the Wawan Classic Expo International Bodybuilding Championship 2016 in Kuwait.

In 2017, he won a gold medal in the 51st Asian Bodybuilding and Physiques Sports Festival in South Korea, and was titled Mr Asia. Following his 2017 win in Thailand, Pushparaj received a house and a sum of Rs. 1 million, by the Housing and Constructing Minister at the time, Sajith Premadasa.

In 2018, he then went on to secure a silver medal at the IFBB Austrian International Bodybuilding Championship, held on 19 May 2018.

Pushparaj was named World Champion in the over 100 kg category at the 10th World Bodybuilding Championship held in Bangkok, Thailand on 16 December 2018, where he was also titled Mr Universe. In March 2019, he received the Popular Sports Personality of the Year as a part of the Newsfirst Platinum Awards.

=== 2020-Present ===
In May 2020, Pushparaj participated in the Super Heavyweight division at the Arnold Amateur competition and placed fourth overall.

== Issues with Local IFBB Elite Pro & SLBF Corruption ==
Pushparaj faced several issues with the local Sri Lankan Bodybuilding Federation (SLBF). Arguably, this was due to a conflict with the SLBF over his criticism of the body's support of the IFBB Elite Pro.

Pushparaj accused the IFBB Elite Pro of being a corrupt body, especially in Sri Lanka. As a result, the SLBF withdrew their sponsorship funding from his events, leading Pushparaj to cover his own flight tickets and other associated costs, despite his previous successes. There was no official welcome when he arrived in Sri Lanka after winning the WBPF in 2017.

Pushpraj claims that the SLBF attempted to have him banned by contacting the Global Bodybuilding Organization, which organized the 2017 Mr Atlas competition in Los Angeles, which is the reason why his VISA was initially rejected.

SLBF then accused Pushparaj of using banned substances. He denied the allegations and accused the federation of attempting to tarnish his image and prevent him from taking part in international events representing Sri Lanka. Despite these challenges, Pushparaj continues to represent Sri Lanka internationally, by super-ceding the SLBF and being represented by the globally ranked WBPF.

== Contest history ==
- 2012 - Earned IFBB pro card
- 2013 - 1st (Gold) - IFBB Pro Championship in Oman
- 2014 - 1st (Gold) - Mr. Sri Lanka Contest
- 2014 - 2nd (Silver) - AFBF 48th Asian Championship (IFBB) (100 KG Category)
- 2014 - 4th Place - Mr & Mrs Atlas and Fitness Expo Contest
- 2014 - 1st (Gold) - Open Weightlifting Championship in Oman (Under 100 kg)
- 2016 - 3rd (Bronze) - Wawan Classic Expo International Bodybuilding Championship 2016, held in Kuwait.
- 2017 - 1st (Gold) Mr Asia Overall Champion - 51st Asian Bodybuilding and Physiques Sports Festival in South Korea
- 2018 - 2nd (Silver) - IFBB Austrian International Bodybuilding Championship
- 2018 - 1st (World champion- Mr Universe) - 10th WBPF World Championship (100 kg+ category), in Bangkok, Thailand
- 2020 - 4th Place - IFBB Pro Arnold Classic Amateur - Super Heavyweight Division

== Awards ==
- 2019 - Popular Sports Personality of the Year - Newsfirst Platinum Awards
- 2020 - 10th WBPF World Championship

== See also ==
- List of male professional bodybuilders
