= Chitharesh Natesan =

Indian professional bodybuilder

- ♂ Professional bodybuilder
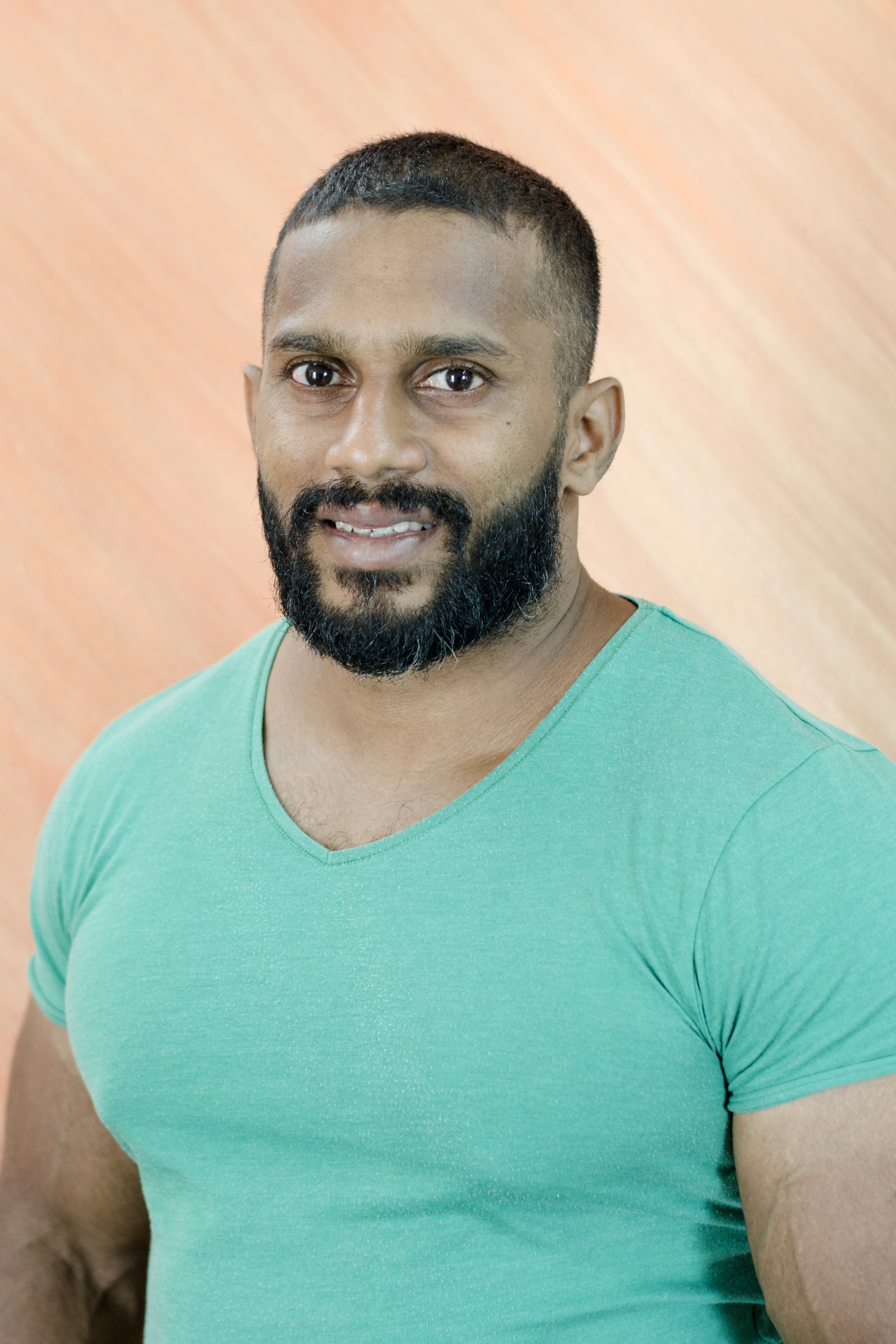

Personal info
- Nickname: The Indian Monster
- Born: 7 May 1986 (age 40); Vaduthala, Kochi, India

Best statistics
- Contest weight: 198 lb (90 kg)
- Height: 5 ft 7 in (170 cm)

Professional (Pro) career
- Pro-debut: EBBF Mr. Dubai - India; 2015
- Best win: WBPF Mr. Universe; 2019
- Predecessor: Lucion Pushparaj
- Active: 2007
Medal record
Men's Bodybuilding
Representing India
11th World Bodybuilding and Physique Sports Championship - WBPF
Gold medal – first place	2019 South Korea	Mr. Universe
Gold medal – first place	2019 South Korea	Mr. World
Mr Asia Championship - ABBF
Gold medal – first place	2019 Indonesia	Mr. Asia
Mr Asia Pacific - TBPA
Gold medal – first place	2019 Thailand	Mr. Asia Pacific
Mr World Championship - IBFF
Gold medal – first place	2018 Slovenia	Mr. World
Representing Delhi
National Championship
	2015 Dubai	Mr. Dubai - India - 6th

Chitharesh Natesan (born 7 May 1986), also known as The Indian Monster, is an Indian professional bodybuilder who won the title of Mr. Universe 2019 at the 11th World Bodybuilding and Physique Sports Championship organised by World Bodybuilding And Physique Sports Federation held in South Korea. He is the first Indian to win the contest.

== Biography ==
Chitharesh was born to Natesan and Nirmala on 7 May 1986, in Vaduthala, Kochi, India. He has two siblings namely Sowmya and Neethu. He is married to Nasiba Nurtaeva from Uzbekistan whom he met during his training career at Delhi. In 2004 he first graduated B.A - History from Maharaja's College, Ernakulam and obtained second graduation in Physical Education from Lakshmibai National College of Physical Education, Thiruvananthapuram. While at the university, he played hockey at University level. After graduation, in 2007 he joined Rejuvenation Fitness Group at Delhi as trainer.

== Career ==
While working as a trainer he participated in district championship organised by Ernakulam District Bodybuilding Association in 2010 in which he was titled as Mr. Ernakulam in 85 kg category. Thereafter, in 2015 he participated bodybuilding championship organised by Emirates Bodybuilding Federation in which he was titled Mr. Dubai - India in 70-80 kg category.
