= Netaji Subhash High Altitude Training Centre =

Sport school in Shilaroo, Shimla, India

- Netaji Subhash High Altitude Training Centre
- Former name: High Altitude Training Centre
- Type: Public
- Established: 2010; 16 years ago
- Affiliations: UGC
- Chancellor: n/a
- Vice-Chancellor: n/a
- Location: Shilaroo, Shimla, Himachal Pradesh, India; 31.202°N 77.423°E
- Campus: High Altitude Training Centre

Netaji Subhash High Altitude Training Centre, commonly known as High Altitude Training Centre, is one of the academic wings of the Sports Authority of India in Hill city of Shilaroo which is 52 km from Shimla.

The training center is spread over the 78 acres at the altitude of 8000 feet and has all the equipment and other facilities for many sports. The main aim of this institute is to help the players to acclimatize to high altitude conditions.

== History ==
Founded in 1984, the Netaji Subhash High Altitude Training Centre was established by Sports Authority of India. After considering locations, Shilaroo was selected due to climate conditions that will help players build endurance, stamina and quick recovery after the heavy training sessions.

The High Altitude Training Centre was established for the training of national players in sports such as boxing, hockey, wrestling, judo, and gymnastics.

== Sports facilities ==
- Gymnasium and swimming pool
- Hockey field astroturf and three grass fields
- Athletic track
- Basketball courts
- 100 beds hostel

=== Hockey stadium ===
The Shilaroo Hockey Stadium was constructed in 2010 and maintained by Sports Authority of India. It has modern facilities for hockey like synthetic turf, etc.

== See also ==
- Lakshmibai National University of Physical Education
- National Institute of Sports
- National Sports University
