= Sri Lanka at the Paralympics =

- IPC code: SRI
- NPC: National Federation of Sports for the Disabled
- Medals Ranked 102nd: Gold 1 Silver 1 Bronze 3 Total 5

Summer appearances
- 1996; 2000; 2004; 2008; 2012; 2016; 2020; 2024

Sri Lanka made its Paralympic Games début at the 1996 Summer Paralympics in Atlanta, with a single athlete (Kalika Pathirana) in track and field. The country has participated in every subsequent edition of the Summer Paralympics, but has never entered the Winter Paralympics.

At the 2012 Summer Paralympics in London, Sri Lanka won their first Paralympic medal through Pradeep Sanjaya, who won the bronze medal in the Men's 400 metres T46.

At the 2016 Summer Paralympics in Rio, Sri Lanka won a bronze. Dinesh Priyantha Herath was placed 3rd in the men's javelin throw F46 final.

At the 2020 Summer Paralympics in Tokyo, Sri Lanka won its first ever Paralympics gold medal, with Dinesh Priyantha Herath taking gold in the men's javelin throw F46 category, setting a new F46 world & paralympic record of 67.79 metres. Dulan Kodithuwakku also claimed the bronze medal in the men's javelin throw F64 category at the 2020 Tokyo Paralympics, with a distance of 65.61 metres.

Both Sanjaya and Priyantha have served in the Sri Lanka Army.

== Medal table ==
=== Medals by Games ===
Games	Athletes	Gold	Silver	Bronze	Total	Rank
(United States) Atlanta 1996	1	0	0	0	0	–
(Australia) Sydney 2000	3	0	0	0	0	–
(Greece) Athens 2004	6	0	0	0	0	–
(China) Beijing 2008	6	0	0	0	0	–
(United Kingdom) London 2012	7	0	0	1	1	74
(Brazil) Rio de Jeneiro 2016	9	0	0	1	1	76
(Japan) Tokyo 2020	9	1	0	1	2	57
(France) Paris 2024	8	0	1	0	1	75
Total		1	1	3	5	102

=== Medals by sport ===
Sport	Gold	Silver	Bronze	Total
Athletics	1	1	3	5
Totals (1 entries)	1	1	3	5

== List of medalists ==
Medal	Name	Games	Sport	Event
Bronze	Pradeep Sanjaya	(United Kingdom) London 2012	Athletics	Men's 400 metres T46
Bronze	Dinesh Priyantha	(Brazil) Rio de Janeiro 2016	Athletics	Men's javelin throw F46
Gold	Dinesh Priyantha	(Japan) Tokyo 2020	Athletics	Men's javelin throw F46
Bronze	Dulan Kodithuwakku	(Japan) Tokyo 2020	Athletics	Men's javelin throw F64
Silver	Dulan Kodithuwakku	(France) Paris 2024	Athletics	Men's javelin throw F64

== See also ==
- Sri Lanka at the Olympics
