= Suresh Dharmasena =

Sri Lankan wheelchair tennis player

Personal information
- Full name: Suresh Ranjan Dharmasena
- Born: 24 June 1989 (age 37) Anuradhapura, North Central Province, Sri Lanka

Sport
- Country: Sri Lanka
- Sport: Wheelchair tennis

Achievements and titles
- Paralympic finals: 2020 Tokyo
Medal record
Men's paralympic athletics
Representing Sri Lanka
Asian Para Games
Men's Wheelchair tennis
Bronze medal – third place	2018 Jakarta	men's doubles

Suresh Ranjan Dharmasena (born 24 June 1989), also known as DSR Dharmasena, is a Sri Lankan wheelchair tennis player. He became a Paralympic competitor after sustaining injuries in the civil war. He made his first Paralympic appearance representing Sri Lanka at the 2020 Summer Paralympics.

== Biography ==
He was raised in Kahatagasdigiliya in the Anuradhapura District. He pursued primary and secondary education at the Kahatagasdigiliya Central College. He joined Sri Lanka Armoured Corps at the age of 18 in 2007 and served as a lance bombardier (artillery regiment) in the Sri Lankan Army.

His left foot was severely injured and had to be amputated when he stepped on an anti-personnel mine on 23 February 2009. It was amputated when he was on his duty in the Pottuvil Lagoon and his army career was brought to an end just before the end of the 26 year long civil war. After becoming a victim of LTTE terrorist attack, he underwent rehabilitation process at the Ragama Ranaviru Sevana for a period of four months.

== Career ==
Suresh was encouraged to take up the sport of wheelchair tennis by the then Brigadier Shiran Abeysekara in 2010. He claimed the bronze medal along with Lasantha Ranaweera in the men's doubles event at the 2018 Asian Para Games. It was the first time Sri Lanka had won a medal in an international wheelchair competition. He won the 2018 Negombo Open ITF Series tournament after defeating Korea's top seed Ha-Gel Lee in straight sets.

In May 2021, he won both the men's singles and men's doubles events at the 14th Sri Lanka Open Wheelchair Tennis tournament. He was a key member of the Sri Lankan team which reached the semi-finals of the 2021 BNP Paribas World Team Cup Qualifiers.

He received bipartite invitation to take part at the 2020 Summer Paralympics following his notable performances at the 2021 BNP Paribas World Team Cup Qualification round held in Portugal. During the Tokyo Paralympics, he competed in section four of the first round event in the men's wheelchair tennis competition.

On 6 March 2022, he won the men's singles title after defeating Sung-Bong Han in three sets 6–2, 3-6 and 7–5 in the final of the 2022 International Wheelchair tennis tournament which was played at the Sri Lanka Tennis Association courts.
