= List of sports events in India =

Sports Events List in 2023

This is a list of sporting events in India, which are all listed by sport, in alphabetical order.

== Aquatics ==
- 1994: 8th Asian Pacific Age Group Swimming & Diving Championships
- 1995: 7th SAF Games
- 1999: 13th Asian Pacific Age Group Swimming & Diving Championships

== Athletics ==
- 1992: 4th Asian Junior Athletic Championships,
- 1994: 7th IAAF International Permit Meet
- 1995:
  - South Asian Federation Games
  - ITC International Permit Meet
- 1996: 6th Asian Junior Athletic Championship
- 1997:
  - 1st Raja Bhalendra Singh South Asian Athletic Meet
  - ITC International Meet
- 1998: 2nd Raja Bhalendra Singh International Athletic Meet
- 1999:
  - International Athletic Circuit Meet (I)
  - International Athletic Circuit Meet (II)
  - International Athletic Circuit Meet (III)
  - International Athletic Circuit Meet (IV)
  - AAFI Salwan International Meet
  - 3rd Raja Bhalendra Singh International Athletic Meet
- 2000:
  - International Athletic Circuit Meet
  - 2nd International Athletic Circuit Meet
  - 37th International Athletic Circuit Meet
- 2002, Asian Athletic Grand Prix
- 2010 Commonwealth Games
- 2030 Commonwealth Games

== Boxing ==
- 1995: YMCA International Boxing Championship
- 1996: Adajania Cup International Boxing Championship
- 1997: YMCA International Boxing Championships
- 1998: YMCA International Boxing Championships
- 1999: Adajania Cup International Boxing Championship
- 2002: YMCA Junior International Boxing Championship
- 2003:
  - YMCA Sr. Jr. & Sub-Jr. Int. Boxing Championship
  - 2nd Asian Women's Boxing Championships, Scheduled
  - 1st International Boxing Championship for Seniors, Scheduled
- 2004: YMCA International Boxing Championship

== Cricket ==
- 1987: 1987 Cricket World Cup
- 1990–1991: 1990–91 Asia Cup
- 1996: 1996 Cricket World Cup
- 1997: 1997 Women's Cricket World Cup
- 1999: 1998–99 Asian Test Championship
- 2006: 2006 ICC Champions Trophy
- 2006: 2006 Women's Asia Cup
- 2011: 2011 Cricket World Cup
- 2013: 2013 Women's Cricket World Cup
- 2016: 2016 World Twenty20
- 2023: 2023 Cricket World Cup

== Cycling ==
- 1989: Asian Cycling Championships
- 2002: 2nd SAARC Cycling Championships

== Gymnastics ==
- 1998: SAF Games
- 2000: 1st Central South Asian Championships
- 2001: 1st SAARC International Gymnastic Championship Games

== Hockey ==
=== Men's Hockey ===
- 1995:
  - Indo-American Friendship Cup
  - Indira Gandhi Gold Cup
  - SAF Games
- 1996:
  - Four Nation Tournament for CM's Cup
  - Indira Gandhi Gold Cup
  - 18th Kuber Champion Trophy

=== Hockey ===
- 1996: India-Australia Test Series
- 1997:
  - India-Poland Test Series
  - India-Germany Test Series
- 1998: India-Pakistan Test Series
- 2001:
  - India-Germany Test Series
  - India-Malaysia Test Series
- 2010:
  - 2010 Men's Hockey World Cup
- 2018:
  - 2018 Men's Hockey World Cup
- 2023
  - 2023 Men's Hockey World Cup

=== Women's Hockey ===
- 1996:
  - 3 Nations Tournament
  - Women's Hockey Tournament
- 1997: 6th Indira Gandhi International Gold Cup
- 1999: 4th Women's Asia Cup
- 2024
  - 2024 Women's Asia Champions Trophy

== Shooting ==
- 1995:
  - 7th South Asian Federation Games
  - 1st Commonwealth Championship
- 1997:
  - VI World Cup
  - 2nd South Asian Shooting Championship
- 2000, ISSF World Cup
- 2003:
  - ISSF World Cup
  - Asian Clay Shooting Championship
- 2010:
  - Commonwealth Games 2010
- 2017
  - ISSF World Cup
- 2019
  - ISSF World Cup

== Table tennis ==
- 1994: Commonwealth Table Tennis Championships
- 1996: 13th Asia Cup Table Tennis Tournament
- 1997:
  - VIth Asian Junior Table Tennis Championship
  - 14th Asian Cup Table Tennis Tournament
- 1999: VII Asian Junior Table Tennis Championship
- 2000: 15th Asia Cup Table Tennis Tournament
- 2001: 15th Commonwealth Table Tennis Championship

== Wrestling ==
- 1992: The 7th Asian Senior Free Style Wrestling Championship
- 1997:
  - The Commonwealth Wrestling Championship
  - The 11th World Cadet Free Style Wrestling Championship
  - The 3rd Asian Junior Free Style, Greco Roman Style & Female Free Style Wrestling Championship

Running Motivation

- The 2018 Running Motivation Yoga at Team Athletics launched a very innovate, fun, loving, creative way of a Running and Fitness workout to cater to both girls and boys, in the age range of 5 to 18 years old.

== See also ==
- Sport in India
- India at the Olympics
