= Amara Indumathi =

Sri Lankan Paralympic athlete

Personal information
- Full name: Amara Lallwala Palliyagurunnans
- National team: Sri Lanka
- Born: 1986 (age 39–40) Monaragala, Sri Lanka
- Years active: 2006-Present

Sport
- Sport: Para Athletics
- Disability class: T47
- Club: Rehab Lanka Sports Club
- Coached by: Vimukthi De Zoysa
Medal record
Women's Athletics
Representing Sri Lanka
Asian Para Games
Bronze medal – third place	2014 Incheon	Women's 200 metres
Gold medal – first place	2018 Jakarta	long jump

Amara Lallwala Palliyagurunnans (born 1986), also known as Amara Indumathi, is a Sri Lankan female Paralympic athlete. She competed at the 2012 Summer Paralympics and at the 2016 Summer Paralympics. Indumathi became the first Sri Lankan woman athlete to represent Sri Lanka at the Paralympics.

Amara has represented her nation at two World Para Athletics Championships in the 2013 World Para Athletics Championships and in the 2017 World Para Athletics Championships.

== Career ==
- Athletics at the 2012 Summer Paralympics – Women's 100 metres - Round 1
- Athletics at the 2012 Summer Paralympics - Women's 200 metres - Round 1
- Athletics at the 2016 Summer Paralympics – Women's 200 metres - 6th
- Athletics at the 2016 Summer Paralympics – Women's long jump - 12th
- Athletics at the 2016 Summer Paralympics - Women's 400 metres - 5th
