= Upali Rajakaruna =

Sri Lankan wheelchair tennis player

Personal information
- Nationality: Sri Lanka
- Born: January 6, 1975 (age 51) Sri Lanka

Sport
- Country: Sri Lanka
- Sport: Wheelchair tennis

Upali Rajakaruna (born January 6, 1975) is a Sri Lankan wheelchair tennis player and a winner of 2008, 2009, 2010, and 2012 Sri Lankan Open Main Draw. He was also a winner of the 2010 and 2011 SSCG Open Main Draw.

== Biography ==
Rajakaruna is a son of a farmer from Kekirawa. He used to be a soldier in Sri Lanka Army organization until an artillery shell ripped his left leg off in 1997 in Welioya. He was in Singha regiment until 2002 when he decided to become a wheelchair tennis player for Sri Lanka Tennis Association. Almost 5 years later he became well known wheelchair tennis player in his nation. Moreover, he was ranked number 102 in the international rankings of sport.
