= Pradeep Sanjaya =

Sri Lankan Paralympic athlete

Personal information
- Born: 29 April 1986 (age 40)

Sport
- Country: Sri Lanka
- Sport: Paralympic athletics
- Disability class: T46

Achievements and titles
- Paralympic finals: 2012 London
Medal record
Men's paralympic athletics
Representing Sri Lanka
Paralympic Games
Bronze medal – third place	2012 London	400 m T46
IPC World Championships
Bronze medal – third place	2013 Lyon	400 m T46
Asian Para Games
Gold medal – first place	2010 Guangzhou	400 m T46
Silver medal – second place	2014 Incheon	800 m T36/46
Bronze medal – third place	2014 Incheon	400 m T46

Uggal Dena Pathirannehelage Pradeep Sanjaya (born 29 April 1986) is a Paralympian track and field athlete from Sri Lanka competing mainly in T46 sprint events. In 2012, in London he became the first Sri Lankan competitor to win a Paralympic medal, taking bronze in the men's 400 metres (T46) race.

== Personal history ==
Pathirana was born in Sri Lanka in 1986. Whilst serving in the Sri Lanka Army in Kilinochchi in 2008, a grenade exploded near to his unit. He and six other soldiers were injured, while another died. Pathirana sustained permanent injuries to his left hand and arm. As of 2016 he serves as a staff sergeant in the Sri Lanka Sinha Regiment of the Sri Lanka Army.

As well as his Paralympic success, Pathirana has also won medals at both IPC World Championship and Asian Para Games level.

== Athletics career ==
After watching soldiers with a disability undertaking various sports, Pathirana was asked by his superiors if he wanted to join. He eventually took up para-athletics in 2010 and that year he was classified as a T46 athlete and entered his first international competition, the 2010 Asian Para Games. In 2012 Pathirana represented Sri Lanka at the Paralympics in London. He entered two events, the 200 metres and 400 metres sprints. In the 200 metres he failed to reach the finals, but in the 400 metres he finished third to claim his and Sri Lanka's first Paralympic medal.
