= Football 5-a-side at the 2012 Summer Paralympics – Men's team squads =

The following is a list of squads for each nation competing in football 5-a-side at the 2012 Summer Paralympics in London.

== Group A ==
=== Brazil ===
The following is the Brazil squad in the football 5-a-side tournament of the 2012 Summer Paralympics.

No.	Pos.	Player	Age	Club
1	GK	Fábio Luiz Ribeiro de Vasconcelos	38	APACE
3	DF	Emerson de Carvalho	28	APADV
4	DF	Gledson da Paixão Barros	21	ICB
5	DF	Cássio Lopes dos Reis	23	ICB
6	MF	Marcos Jose Alves Felipe	30	APACE
7	MF	Jeferson da Conceição Gonçalves	22	ICB
8	FW	Raimundo Nonato Alves Mendes	25	ADVP
9	MF	Severino Gabriel da Silva	29	APACE
10	MF	Ricardo Steinmetz Alves	23	AGAFUC
12	GK	Daniel Dantas da Silva	29	APACE

=== China ===
The following is the China squad in the football 5-a-side tournament of the 2012 Summer Paralympics.

No.	Pos.	Player	Age	Club
1	GK	Huachu Xu	21	Fujian
2	DF	Kai Gao	25	Fujian
3	MF	Shanyong Chen	24	Jiangsu
5	DF	Xiaoqiang Li	30	Yunnan
6	FW	Dongdong Lin	22	Fujian
8	DF	Lijing Zhang	18	Liaoning
9	MF	Zhoubin Wang	22	Fujian
10	FW	Wenfa Zheng	20	Liaoning
11	FW	Yafeng Wang	22	Fujian
12	GK	Lei Niu	25	Hebei

=== France ===
The following is the France squad in the football 5-a-side tournament of the 2012 Summer Paralympics.

No.	Pos.	Player	Age	Club
1	GK	Jonathan Grangier	24	Unadev Bordeaux
4	FW	Gaël Rivière	22	Cecifoot St Mande
5	DF	Hakim Arezki	29	Cecifoot St Mande
6	FW	Martin Baron	25	Cecifoot St Mande
7	DF	Abderrahim Maya	36	Unadev Bordeaux
8	MF	David Labarre	24	Unadev Bordeaux
9	FW	Arnaud Ayax	26	Unadev Toulouse
10	FW	Frédéric Villeroux	29	Unadev Bordeaux
11	DF	Yvan Wouandji	19	AVH Paris
12	GK	Frédéric Jannas	38	Cecifoot Saint Priest

=== Turkey ===
The following is the Turkey squad in the football 5-a-side tournament of the 2012 Summer Paralympics.

No.	Pos.	Player	Age	Club
1	GK	Ali Hidir Kurt	33	BOGES – Ankara
2	DF	Mikail Guclu	23	Istanbul – GES Club
5	DF	Ali Cavdar	32	Istanbul – GES Club
6	MF	Ramazan Kunduz	26	Tokat Erbag GES Club
7	MF	Mucahit Huseyin Uslu	23	Ankara – Çankaya GES Club
8	DF	Vedat Yavuz	38	Ordu – GES Club
9	FW	Kahraman Kurbetoglu	28	Malatya – GES Club
10	FW	Ibrahim Uzum	23	Gaziantep Zeugma GES Club
11	FW	Abdullah Sumer	19	Kayseri -GES Club
12	GK	Ismail Koc	40	Istanbul – GES Club

== Group B ==
=== Argentina ===
The following is the Argentina squad in the football 5-a-side tournament of the 2012 Summer Paralympics.

No.	Pos.	Player	Age	Club
1	GK	Dario Lencina	32	Estudiantes de la Plata
2	DF	Angel Deldo	24	Achadec de Chaco
3	MF	Federico Accardi	23	Bella Vista de Mendoza
4	MF	Froilán Padilla	33	Unión de Delviso
5	FW	Silvio Velo	41	River Plate
8	DF	Lucas Rodriguez	30	Mun. De Cordoba
9	FW	Luis Sacayan	32	Univ. De Tucuman
10	FW	David Peralta	31	Estudiantes de la Plata
11	MF	Marcelo Panizza	28	River Plate
12	GK	Guido Consoni	22	Estudiantes de la Plata

=== Great Britain ===
The following is the Great Britain squad in the football 5-a-side tournament of the 2012 Summer Paralympics.

No.	Pos.	Player	Age	Club
1	GK	Lewis Skyers	28
3	DF	William Norman	33
4	DF	Keryn Seal	30
5	DF	Daniel English	21
6	MF	Robin Williams	24
7	FW	David Clarke	41
8	MF	Lee Brunton	18
9	MF	Roy Turnham	27
10	MF	Darren Harris	39
13	GK	Dan James	25

=== Iran ===
The following is the Iran squad in the football 5-a-side tournament of the 2012 Summer Paralympics.

No.	Pos.	Player	Age	Club
1	GK	Morteza Maboodi Dalivand	32	Gilan
2	DF	Amir Pourrazavi Haftdaran	27	Azarbayejan Sharghi
3	DF	Maghsoud Gholizadeh Abdoljabbar	30	Azarbayejan Sharghi
4	FW	Mohammad Keshtkar	28	Fars
7	FW	Abdolhamid Shalhavizadeh	25	Khoozestan
8	DF	Mohammad Heidari	28	Khoozestan
9	FW	Hossein Rajab Pour	25	Khoozestan
10	FW	Behzad Zadaliasghari Yengejeh	24	Azarbayejan Sharghi
11	FW	Ahmadreza Shah Hosseini Ardekani	22	Fars
12	GK	Meysam Shojaeiyan	23	Fars

=== Spain ===
The following is the Spain squad in the football 5-a-side tournament of the 2012 Summer Paralympics.

No.	Pos.	Player	Age	Club
1	GK	Álvaro González Alcaraz	37	C.D. De Ciegos De Málaga
3	FW	José Luis Giera Tejuelo	27	Once Alicante
4	MF	Francisco Muñoz Pérez	26	Once Tarragona
6	DF	Adolfo Acosta Rodríguez	31	Once Madrid
7	FW	José López Ramírez	36	Once Tarragona
8	DF	Alfredo Cuadrado Freire	43	C.D. De Ciegos De Málaga
9	MF	Antonio Martín Gaitán	30	C.D. De Ciegos De Málaga
10	MF	Youssef El Haddaoui	23	Once Tarragona
11	MF	Marcelo Rosado Carrasco	33	C.D. De Ciegos De Málaga
13	GK	Raúl Díaz Ortín	32	Once Murcia

== See also ==
- Football 7-a-side at the 2012 Summer Paralympics – Team squads
