= Blind football at the 2024 Summer Paralympics – Men's team squads =

The following is a list of squads for each nation competing in blind football at the 2024 Summer Paralympics in Paris.

== Group A ==
=== Brazil ===
Coach: Fábio Vasconcelos

The following is the Brazil squad in the football 5-a-side tournament of the 2024 Summer Paralympics. The roster was announced on 25 June 2024.

| No. | Pos. | Player | Class | Date of birth (age) |
|---|---|---|---|---|
| 1 | GK | Luan Gonçalves | Sighted | 6 January 1993 (aged 31) |
| 4 | DF | Maicon Júnior | B1 | 1 June 2000 (aged 24) |
| 5 | DF | Cássio Lopes | B1 | 15 May 1989 (aged 35) |
| 6 | FW | Jonatan Borges da Silva | B1 | 15 August 1998 (aged 26) |
| 7 | FW | Jefinho | B1 | 5 October 1989 (aged 34) |
| 8 | FW | Nonato | B1 | 19 August 1987 (aged 37) |
| 9 | FW | Tiago da Silva | B1 | 28 September 1995 (aged 28) |
| 10 | FW | Ricardo Alves | B1 | 15 December 1988 (aged 35) |
| 11 | FW | Jardiel Soares | B1 | 26 July 1996 (aged 28) |
| 12 | GK | Matheus Bumussa | Sighted | 3 October 1994 (aged 29) |

=== China ===
Coach: Wang Guishun

The following is the China squad in the football 5-a-side tournament of the 2024 Summer Paralympics.

| No. | Pos. | Player | Class | Date of birth (age) |
|---|---|---|---|---|
| 1 | GK | Wu Limin | Sighted | 6 February 1990 (aged 34) |
| 2 | FW | Tang Zhihua | B1 | 13 April 1993 (aged 31) |
| 3 | DF | Liu Meng | B1 | 30 June 1995 (aged 29) |
| 6 | FW | Zhang Jiabin | B1 | 9 May 1994 (aged 30) |
| 7 | MF | Yu Yutan | B1 | 31 December 1988 (aged 35) |
| 8 | DF | Li Haifu | B1 | 19 December 1998 (aged 25) |
| 9 | FW | Xu Guansheng | B1 | 3 June 1996 (aged 28) |
| 10 | FW | Zhong Liang | B1 | 5 May 2001 (aged 23) |
| 11 | FW | Zhu Ruiming | B1 | 3 April 2000 (aged 24) |
| 12 | GK | Xu Huachu | Sighted | 3 May 1991 (aged 33) |

=== France ===
Coach: Toussaint Akpweh

The following is the France squad in the football 5-a-side tournament of the 2024 Summer Paralympics.

| No. | Pos. | Player | Class | Date of birth (age) |
|---|---|---|---|---|
| 1 | GK | Alessandro Bartolomucci | Sighted | 3 August 1997 (aged 27) |
| 3 | DF | Mickael Miguez | B1 | 11 January 1994 (aged 30) |
| 4 | FW | Gael Riviere | B1 | 22 December 1989 (aged 34) |
| 5 | DF | Hakim Arezki | B1 | 19 March 1983 (aged 41) |
| 6 | FW | Martin Baron | B1 | 24 July 1987 (aged 37) |
| 9 | FW | Khalifa Youmé | B1 | 11 November 1982 (aged 41) |
| 10 | MF | Frédéric Villeroux | B1 | 29 June 1983 (aged 41) |
| 11 | MF | Ahmed Tidiane Diakite | B1 | 30 December 1982 (aged 41) |
| 13 | FW | Fabrice Morgado | B1 | 7 March 1991 (aged 33) |
| 16 | GK | Benoit Chevreau de Montlehu | Sighted | 27 January 1989 (aged 35) |

=== Turkey ===
Coach: Niyazi Metin

The following is the Turkey squad in the football 5-a-side tournament of the 2024 Summer Paralympics.

| No. | Pos. | Player | Class | Date of birth (age) |
|---|---|---|---|---|
| 1 | GK | Hüseyin Saygılı | Sighted | 6 May 1991 (aged 33) |
| 2 | MF | Recep Aydeniz | B1 | 19 December 1995 (aged 28) |
| 3 | DF | Muhammed Ali Öktem | B1 | 10 August 2001 (aged 23) |
| 5 | DF | Ertuğrul Demirel | B1 | 11 October 1990 (aged 33) |
| 7 | MF | Emre Aslan | B1 | 7 November 1996 (aged 27) |
| 10 | MF | Celal Çoban | B1 | 23 June 1993 (aged 31) |
| 11 | FW | Hasan Şatay | B1 | 7 October 1994 (aged 29) |
| 14 | FW | Oğuzhan Yokuş | B1 | 13 September 1996 (aged 27) |
| 16 | DF | Semih Deniz | B1 | 4 January 1989 (aged 35) |
| 23 | GK | Kerem Yıldırır | Sighted | 25 January 2004 (aged 20) |

== Group B ==
=== Argentina ===
Coach: Antonio Figueroa

The following is the Argentina squad in the football 5-a-side tournament of the 2024 Summer Paralympics.

| No. | Pos. | Player | Class | Date of birth (age) |
|---|---|---|---|---|
| 1 | GK | Darío Lencina | Sighted | 22 August 1980 (aged 44) |
| 2 | DF | Angel Deldo Garcia | B1 | 30 September 1987 (aged 36) |
| 3 | MF | Nahuel Heredia | B1 | 26 May 1995 (aged 29) |
| 4 | DF | Froilan Padilla | B1 | 21 February 1979 (aged 45) |
| 5 | MF | Jesus Merlos | B1 | 17 April 2003 (aged 21) |
| 6 | MF | Matias Olivera | B1 | 26 March 1997 (aged 27) |
| 7 | FW | Maximiliano Espinillo | B1 | 15 November 1993 (aged 30) |
| 8 | MF | Osvaldo Fernández | B1 | 1 September 1998 (aged 25) |
| 9 | FW | Mario Ríos | B1 | 9 January 1989 (aged 35) |
| 12 | GK | Germán Muleck | Sighted | 3 May 1990 (aged 34) |

=== Colombia ===
Coach: Fernando Carrillo Ramirez

The following is the Colombia squad in the football 5-a-side tournament of the 2024 Summer Paralympics.

| No. | Pos. | Player | Class | Date of birth (age) |
|---|---|---|---|---|
| 1 | GK | Jhohan Ardila | Sighted | 26 August 1998 (aged 26) |
| 2 | MF | Fredy López | B1 | 10 October 1984 (aged 39) |
| 5 | MF | Alex Martínez | B1 | 6 February 1986 (aged 38) |
| 6 | DF | Jesús López | B1 | 29 November 1993 (aged 30) |
| 7 | DF | Jhon Hernández | B1 | 12 June 1993 (aged 31) |
| 8 | FW | Lino Coca | B1 | 23 September 2003 (aged 20) |
| 9 | FW | Jhon Éider González | B1 | 27 July 1997 (aged 27) |
| 10 | FW | Juan Pérez | B1 | 3 March 1996 (aged 28) |
| 11 | FW | Julián Jaramillo | B1 | 24 July 2001 (aged 23) |
| 12 | GK | Jhon Fredy Gómez | Sighted | 4 May 1990 (aged 34) |

=== Morocco ===
Coach: Driss El Mountaqi

The following is the Morocco squad in the football 5-a-side tournament of the 2024 Summer Paralympics.

| No. | Pos. | Player | Class | Date of birth (age) |
|---|---|---|---|---|
| 1 | GK | Samir Bara | Sighted | 29 June 1984 (aged 40) |
| 3 | DF | Houssam Ghilli | B1 | 9 September 1993 (aged 30) |
| 4 | DF | Said El-Mselek | B1 | 14 October 2000 (aged 23) |
| 5 | DF | Hicham Lamlas | B1 | 1 September 1991 (aged 32) |
| 6 | DF | Elhabib Ait Bajja | B1 | 24 February 1998 (aged 26) |
| 7 | FW | Ayoub Hadimi | B1 | 31 December 1998 (aged 25) |
| 8 | MF | Mohamed El Hamouchi | B1 | 18 February 2003 (aged 21) |
| 9 | FW | Zouhair Snisla | B1 | 24 January 1999 (aged 25) |
| 10 | FW | Abderrazak Hattab | B1 | 11 July 1991 (aged 33) |
| 12 | GK | Khalid Kermadi | Sighted | 27 June 1982 (aged 42) |

=== Japan ===
Coach: Eiji Nakagawa

The following is the Japan squad in the football 5-a-side tournament of the 2024 Summer Paralympics.

| No. | Pos. | Player | Class | Date of birth (age) |
|---|---|---|---|---|
| 1 | GK | Daisuke Sato | Sighted | 16 June 1984 (aged 40) |
| 2 | DF | Futo Nagamori | B1 | 19 February 2001 (aged 23) |
| 3 | DF | Robertoizumi Sasaki | B1 | 1 May 1978 (aged 46) |
| 4 | FW | Hiroto Takahashi | B1 | 5 October 1998 (aged 25) |
| 6 | MF | Taichi Hirabayashi | B1 | 2 October 2006 (aged 17) |
| 8 | FW | Masaki Goto | B1 | 8 April 1985 (aged 39) |
| 10 | MF | Ryo Kawamura | B1 | 12 February 1989 (aged 35) |
| 11 | MF | Kento Torii | B1 | 9 June 1991 (aged 33) |
| 14 | FW | Yuzuki Sonobe | B1 | 31 August 2003 (aged 20) |
| 15 | GK | Kenya Izumi | Sighted | 25 July 1992 (aged 32) |
