= Football 5-a-side at the 2012 Summer Paralympics =

Football 5-a-side at the XIV Paralympic Games
- Venue: Olympic Hockey Centre
- Dates: 31 August – 8 September 2012
- Competitors: 96 (8 teams)

Medalists
| 1st place, gold medalist(s) | | Brazil | Brazil |
| 2nd place, silver medalist(s) | | France | France |
| 3rd place, bronze medalist(s) | | Spain | Spain |

Football 5-a-side at the 2012 Summer Paralympics was held in London at the Riverbank Arena, from 31 August to 8 September. Football 5-a-side is played by athletes with visual impairment, with a ball with a noise making device inside.

For these games, the men competed in an 8-team tournament. Brazil were the favourites since they had won both in Athens 2004 and in Beijing 2008; they were also the defending world champions.

== Qualifying ==
| Means of qualification | Date | Venue | Berths | Qualified |
|---|---|---|---|---|
| Host nation | | | 1 | Great Britain (GBR) |
| 2010 IBSA World Blind Football Championship | 14–22 August 2010 | United Kingdom | 1 | Brazil (BRA) |
| 2010 Asian Para-Games | 13–18 December 2010 | Guangzhou, China | 1 | China (CHN) |
| 2011 IBSA Football 5-a-side European Championships | 17 June – 1 July 2011 | Aksaray, Turkey | 2 | France (FRA) |
| 2011 IBSA Football 5-a-side European Championships | 17 June – 1 July 2011 | Aksaray, Turkey | 2 | Spain (ESP) |
| 2011 Parapan American Games | 15–20 November 2011 | Guadalajara, Mexico | 1 | Argentina (ARG) |
| Wildcard | | | 2 | Turkey (TUR) |
| Wildcard | | | 2 | Iran (IRI) |
| Total | | | 8 | |

== Squads ==
Each of the eight participating nations submitted a squad of ten men – eight blind or visually impaired players and two sighted goalkeepers. For the first time, the sighted players were awarded medals as part of their team.

== Group stage ==
=== Group A ===
| Pos | Team | Pld | W | D | L | GF | GA | GD | Pts | Qualification or relegation |
|---|---|---|---|---|---|---|---|---|---|---|
| 1 | Brazil (BRA) | 3 | 2 | 1 | 0 | 5 | 0 | +5 | 7 | Qualified for the medal round |
| 2 | France (FRA) | 3 | 1 | 2 | 0 | 1 | 0 | +1 | 5 | Qualified for the medal round |
| 3 | China (CHN) | 3 | 1 | 1 | 1 | 4 | 1 | +3 | 4 | Qualified for the classification round |
| 4 | Turkey (TUR) | 3 | 0 | 0 | 3 | 0 | 9 | −9 | 0 | Qualified for the classification round |

31 August 2012
9:00

| Brazil | 0–0 | France |
|---|---|---|
| | Report |

Riverbank Arena
Attendance: 1,202
Referee: Mariano Travaglino (Argentina)

31 August 2012
11:00

| China | 4–0 | Turkey |
|---|---|---|
| Wenfa Zheng 2', 50'; Xiaoqiang Li 13' (pen.); Yafeng Wang 46' | Report |

Riverbank Arena
Attendance: 1,938
Referee: Paul Leversuch (Germany)

2 September 2012
9:00

| Turkey | 0–4 | Brazil |
|---|---|---|
| | Report | Conceição 4', 38'; Alves 14'; Da Silva 24' (pen.) |

Riverbank Arena
Attendance: 1,438
Referee: Mariano Travaglino (Argentina)

2 September 2012
11:00

| France | 0–0 | China |
|---|---|---|
| | Report |

Riverbank Arena
Attendance: 1,554
Referee: Paul Leversuch (Great Britain)

4 September 2012
9:00

| Brazil | 1–0 | China |
|---|---|---|
| Conceição 22' | Report |

Riverbank Arena
Attendance: 931
Referee: Germinal Lubrano (Argentina)

4 September 2012
11:00

| France | 1–0 | Turkey |
|---|---|---|
| Labarre 4' (pen.) | Report |

Riverbank Arena
Attendance: 1,421
Referee: Mariano Travaglino (Argentina)

=== Group B ===
| Pos | Team | Pld | W | D | L | GF | GA | GD | Pts | Qualification |
|---|---|---|---|---|---|---|---|---|---|---|
| 1 | Spain (ESP) | 3 | 1 | 2 | 0 | 3 | 1 | +2 | 5 | Qualified for the medal round |
| 2 | Argentina (ARG) | 3 | 1 | 2 | 0 | 2 | 0 | +2 | 5 | Qualified for the medal round |
| 3 | Iran (IRI) | 3 | 1 | 0 | 2 | 1 | 4 | −3 | 3 | Qualified for the classification round |
| 4 | Great Britain (GBR) | 3 | 0 | 2 | 1 | 1 | 2 | −1 | 2 | Qualified for the classification round |

31 August 2012
13:30

| Iran | 0–2 | Argentina |
|---|---|---|
| | Report | Velo 27', 48' |

Riverbank Arena
Attendance: 1,985
Referee: François Carcouët (France)

31 August 2012
15:30

| Great Britain | 1–1 | Spain |
|---|---|---|
| Clarke 22' | Report | Martín Gaitán 20' (pen.) |

Riverbank Arena
Attendance: 2,630
Referee: Lucio Morgado (Brazil)

2 September 2012
13:30

| Spain | 2–0 | Iran |
|---|---|---|
| Martín Gaitán 13', 22' | Report |

Riverbank Arena
Attendance: 1,996
Referee: Lucio Morgado (Brazil)

2 September 2012
15:30

| Argentina | 0–0 | Great Britain |
|---|---|---|
| | Report |

Riverbank Arena
Attendance: 2,179
Referee: François Carcouët (France)

4 September 2012
13:30

| Spain | 0–0 | Argentina |
|---|---|---|
| | Report |

Riverbank Arena
Attendance: 1,836
Referee: Lucio Morgado (Brazil)

4 September 2012
15:30

| Great Britain | 0–1 | Iran |
|---|---|---|
| | Report | Ardekani 21' (pen.) |

Riverbank Arena
Attendance: 2,273
Referee: François Carcouët (France)

== Knockout stage ==
=== Classification round ===
==== 5th–8th place semi-finals ====
6 September 2012
9:00

| China | 1–1 (a.e.t.) | Great Britain |
|---|---|---|
| Li 40' (pen.) | Report | English 47' |
Penalties
| Li (penalty scored); Wang (penalty scored) | 2–1 | (penalty missed) Clarke; (penalty scored) English; (penalty missed) Seal |

Riverbank Arena
Attendance: 1,893
Referee: Juan Carlos Paule (Spain)

6 September 2012
11:00

| Iran | 1–0 | Turkey |
|---|---|---|
| Rajab Pour 19' | Report |

Riverbank Arena
Attendance: 1,510
Referee: Niels Haupt (Germany)

==== 7th–8th place match ====
8 September 2012
9:00

| Turkey | 0–2 | Great Britain |
|---|---|---|
| | Report | Seal 5'; Clarke 48' |

Riverbank Arena
Attendance: 969
Referee: Germinal Lubrano (Argentina)

==== 5th–6th place match ====
8 September 2012
11:15

| Iran | 0–0 (a.e.t.) | China |
|---|---|---|
| | Report |
Penalties
| Shalhavizadeh (penalty missed); Ardekani (penalty missed); Haftdaran (penalty missed) | 0–1 | (penalty missed) Zhoubin; (penalty scored) Yafeng; (penalty missed) Dongdong |

Riverbank Arena
Attendance: 1,603
Referee: François Carcouët (France)

=== Medal round ===
==== Semi-finals ====
6 September 2012
15:45

| Brazil | 0–0 (a.e.t.) | Argentina |
|---|---|---|
| | Report |
Penalties
| Severino (penalty scored) dos Reis (penalty missed) | 1–0 | (penalty missed) Sacayan; (penalty missed) Velo; (penalty missed) Padilla |

Riverbank Arena
Attendance: 2,016
Referee: François Carcouët (France)

6 September 2012
13:30

| Spain | 0–2 | France |
|---|---|---|
| | Report | Villeroux 23', 49' |

Riverbank Arena
Attendance: 1,796
Referee: Lucio Morgado (Brazil)

==== Bronze medal match ====
8 September 2012
13:30

| Spain | 0–0 (a.e.t.) | Argentina |
|---|---|---|
| | Report |
Penalties
| Martín Gaitán (penalty scored); Rosado Carrasco (penalty missed); Giera Tejuelo (penalty missed) | 1–0 | (penalty missed) Rodriguez; (penalty missed) Velo; (penalty missed) Deldo |

Riverbank Arena
Attendance: 1,785
Referee: Lucio Morgado (Brazil)

==== Gold medal match ====
8 September 2012
16:00

| France | 0–2 | Brazil |
|---|---|---|
| | Report | Severino 22' (pen.); Baron 42' (o.g.) |

Riverbank Arena
Attendance: 1,990
Referee: Mariano Travaglino (Argentina)

== Medallists ==
| Event | Gold | Silver | Bronze |
|---|---|---|---|
| Men's team | Brazil (BRA); Fábio Vasconcelos; Daniel Dantas da Silva; Emerson de Carvalho; Gledson da Paixão; Cássio Lopes dos Reis; Marcos Felipe; Jeferson da Conceição Gonçalves; Severino Gabriel da Silva; Ricardo Steinmetz Alves (captain); Raimundo Nonato Alves Mendes | France (FRA); Frédéric Jannas; Hakim Arezki; Abderrahim Maya; Yvan Kepmegni; David Labarre; Jonathan Grangier; Gaël Rivière; Martin Baron; Arnaud Ayax; Frédéric Villeroux (captain) | Spain (ESP); Álvaro Gonzalez Alcaraz; José Luis Giera Tejuelo; Francisco Muñoz Pérez; Adolfo Acosta Rodriguez (captain); José López Ramírez; Alfredo Cuadrado Freire; Antonio Martín Gaitán; Youssef El Haddaoui Rabii; Marcelo Rosado Carrasco; Raul Díaz Ortín |

== See also ==
- Football 7-a-side at the 2012 Summer Paralympics
- Football at the 2012 Summer Olympics
