= 1987–88 Real Madrid CF season =

86th season in existence of Real Madrid CF

Real Madrid CF
1987–88 season
- President: Ramón Mendoza
- Head coach: Leo Beenhakker
- Stadium: Santiago Bernabeu
- La Liga: 1st (in 1988–89 European Cup)
- Copa del Rey: Semi-finals
- European Cup: Semi-finals
- Top goalscorer: League: Hugo Sánchez (29 goals); All: Hugo Sánchez (35 goals)
Home colours	Away colours

The 1987–88 season was Real Madrid Club de Fútbol's 86th season in existence and the club's 57th consecutive season in the top flight of Spanish football.

== Overview ==
Real Madrid finished the season as champions for the third season running, claiming the club's 23rd league title overall. Los Blancos finished 11 points ahead of the runners-up, that this time were Real Sociedad. However, Madrid lost to the Basque side in the Copa del Rey semi-finals 0–5 on aggregate and were knocked out at the same stage of the European Cup by PSV Eindhoven.

== Squad ==
Note: Flags indicate national team as defined under FIFA eligibility rules; some limited exceptions apply. Players may hold more than one non-FIFA nationality.

No.	Pos.	Nation	Player
—	GK	ESP	Francisco Buyo
—	GK	ESP	Otxotorena
—	GK	ESP	Agustín
—	DF	ESP	Chendo
—	DF	ESP	Miguel Tendillo
—	DF	ESP	Manuel Sanchís
—	DF	ESP	José Antonio Camacho
—	DF	ESP	Jesús Ángel Solana
—	DF	ESP	Mino
—	DF	ESP	Francis Perez
—	DF	ESP	Mandía
—	DF	ESP	Antonio Maceda
—	MF	ESP	Rafael Martín Vázquez

No.	Pos.	Nation	Player
—	MF	ESP	Míchel
—	MF	YUG	Milan Janković
—	MF	ESP	Rafael Gordillo
—	MF	ESP	Ricardo Gallego
—	MF	ESP	Paco Llorente
—	MF	ESP	Juan José Maqueda
—	MF	ESP	Adolfo Aldana
—	MF	ESP	Santiago Aragon
—	FW	MEX	Hugo Sánchez
—	FW	ESP	Emilio Butragueño
—	FW	ESP	Santillana
—	FW	ARG	Jorge Valdano
—	FW	ESP	Aguilá

=== Transfers ===
In
Pos.	Name	from	Type
MF	Paco Llorente	Atlético Madrid	
DF	Francisco Muñoz Pérez	Valencia CF	
DF	Miguel Tendillo	Real Murcia	
MF	Adolfo Aldana	Castilla	
MF	Santiago Aragon	Castilla	
MF	Maqueda	Castilla	

Out
Pos.	Name	To	Type
FW	Juanito	Málaga CF	
FW	Miguel Pardeza	Real Zaragoza	
DF	José Antonio Salguero	Sevilla FC	

== Competitions ==
=== La Liga ===
==== Results by round ====
Round	1	2	3	4	5	6	7	8	9	10	11	12	13	14	15	16	17	18	19	20	21	22	23	24	25	26	27	28	29	30	31	32	33	34	35	36	37	38
Ground	A	H	A	H	A	H	A	H	A	H	A	H	A	H	A	H	A	H	A	H	A	H	A	H	A	H	A	H	A	H	A	H	A	H	A	H	A	H
Result	W	W	W	W	W	W	W	W	D	L	W	W	W	W	L	W	D	W	W	W	W	W	L	W	D	W	D	W	W	W	W	W	D	W	L	W	D	W
Position	1	1	1	1	1	1	1	1	1	1	1	1	1	1	1	1	1	1	1	1	1	1	1	1	1	1	1	1	1	1	1	1	1	1	1	1	1	1

Source: BDFutbol
A = Away; H = Home; W = Win; D = Draw; L = Loss; = Leader, 1988–89 European Cup; = 1988–89 UEFA Cup; = 1988–89 Segunda División

==== League table ====
Pos	Team	Pld	W	D	L	GF	GA	GD	Pts	Qualification or relegation
1	Real Madrid (C)	38	28	6	4	95	26	+69	62	Qualification for the European Cup first round
2	Real Sociedad	38	22	7	9	61	33	+28	51	Qualification for the UEFA Cup first round
3	Atlético Madrid	38	19	10	9	60	38	+22	48	Qualification for the UEFA Cup first round
4	Athletic Bilbao	38	17	12	9	50	43	+7	46	Qualification for the UEFA Cup first round
5	Osasuna	38	15	10	13	40	34	+6	40	

Source: BDFútbol
Rules for classification: 1) Points; 2) Head-to-head results; 3) Goal difference; 4) Number of goals scored
(C) Champions

==== Matches ====
29 August 1987 1	Cádiz	0–4	Real Madrid	Cádiz
		Report	Sánchez 35'; Butragueño 65'; Gallego 72'; Gordillo 79'	Stadium: Ramon de Carranza; Referee: Antonio Martin Navarrete

5 September 1987 2	Real Madrid	7–0	Sporting Gijón	Madrid
	Gordillo 28'; Sánchez 45', 56', 73' (pen.); Sanchis 65'; Vázquez 77'; Michel 85'	Report		Stadium: Santiago Bernabéu; Referee: Jaime Bayarri Rivelles

11 September 1987 3	Real Zaragoza	1–7	Real Madrid	Zaragoza
	Roberto 89'	Report	Gordillo 30'; Lumbreras 35' (o.g.); Butragueño 56'; Michel 80', 81' (pen.); Chendo 85'; Janković 87'	Stadium: La Romareda

19 September 1987 4	Real Madrid	3–0	Osasuna	Madrid
	Michel 41'; Sánchez 83'; Gordillo 89'	Report		Stadium: Santiago Bernabéu; Referee: Jose Merino Gonzalez

25 September 1987 5	Las Palmas	0–2	Real Madrid	Las Palmas
		Report	Sánchez 14'; Janković 87'	Stadium: Gran Canaria

4 October 1987 6	Real Madrid	3–1	Sevilla	Madrid
	Tendillo 55'; Sánchez 63' (pen.); Butragueño 85'	Report	Ramon 18'	Stadium: Santiago Bernabéu; Referee: Miguel Marín Lopez

17 October 1987 7	Español	0–2	Real Madrid	Barcelona
		Report	Janković 18'; Sánchez 53'	Stadium: Sarriá; Referee: Tomas Jimenez Moreno

25 October 1987 8	Real Madrid	4–0	Valencia	Madrid
	Sánchez 21'; Sanchis 44'; Michel 64'; Vázquez 75'	Report		Stadium: Santiago Bernabéu; Referee: Ildefonso Urizar

30 October 1987 9	Athletic Bilbao	0–0	Real Madrid	Bilbao
		Report		Stadium: San Mames

6 November 1987 10	Real Madrid	0–4	Atlético Madrid	Madrid
		Report	Salinas 10'; Futre 50'; Ufarte 74', 82'	Stadium: Santiago Bernabéu; Referee: Severiano Perez Sanchez

21 November 1987 11	Sabadell	0–2	Real Madrid	Sabadell
		Report	Sánchez 11' (pen.); Butragueño 41'	Stadium: de la nova creu alta

28 November 1987 12	Real Madrid	3–1	Mallorca	Madrid
	Sanchis 8'; Sánchez 36'; Vázquez 55'	Report	Fadil 89'	Stadium: Santiago Bernabéu; Referee: Antonio Taboada Soto

5 December 1987 13	Logroñés	1–3	Real Madrid	Logroño
	Amaro 59'	Report	Sánchez 19', 63' (pen.); Butragueño 87'	Stadium: Las Gaunas

12 December 1987 14	Real Madrid	2–0	Celta Vigo	Madrid
	Tendillo 1'; Michel 63'	Report		Stadium: Santiago Bernabéu; Referee: Antonio Martin Navarrete

19 December 1987 15	Real Betis	2–1	Real Madrid	Seville
	Melenas 7'; Quico 12'	Report	Sanchis 89'	Stadium: Benito Villamarin; Referee: Jose Perez Sanchez

1 January 1988 16	Real Madrid	2–1	Barcelona	Madrid
	Sánchez 21' (pen.), 41'	Report	Schuster 30' (pen.)	Stadium: Santiago Bernabéu; Referee: Joaquín Urío Velázquez

9 January 1988 17	Real Murcia	1–1	Real Madrid	Madrid
	Manolo 14'	Report	Tendillo 83'	Stadium: Santiago Bernabéu; Referee: Victoriano Sanchez Arminio

15 January 1988 18	Real Madrid	1–0	Real Sociedad	Madrid
	Butragueño 57'	Report		Stadium: Santiago Bernabéu

23 January 1988 19	Real Valladolid	0–2	Real Madrid	Valladolid
		Report	Vázquez 40'; Llorente 66'	Stadium: Jose Zorrilla; Referee: Miguel Marín Lopez

30 January 1988 20	Real Madrid	4–0	Cádiz	Madrid
	Sanchis 10'; Sánchez 26' (pen.), 43'; Maqueda 86'	Report		Stadium: Santiago Bernabéu; Referee: Jose Socorro Gonzalez

6 February 1988 21	Sporting Gijón	1–2	Real Madrid	Gijón
	Juanma 16'		Vázquez 47'; Sánchez 85'	Stadium: El Molinon; Referee: Joaquin Urio Velazquez

9 February 1988 22	Real Madrid	2–1	Real Zaragoza	Madrid
	Sanchis 34'; Llorente 76'	Report	Sosa 59'	Stadium: Santiago Bernabéu; Referee: José Pajarez Paz

12 February 1988 23	Osasuna	2–1	Real Madrid	Pamplona
	Goikoetxea 21'; Ripodas 60'	Report	Sánchez 54' (pen.)	Stadium: El Sadar; Referee: Jose Miguel Perez

20 February 1988 24	Real Madrid	5–0	Las Palmas	Madrid
	Tendillo 39'; Michel 41'; Sanchis 55'; Sánchez 62', 83' (pen.)	Report		Stadium: Santiago Bernabéu; Referee: Eusebio Alvarez Diaz

26 February 1988 25	Sevilla	1–1	Real Madrid	Seville
	Salguero 33'	Report	Butragueño 53'	Stadium: Sanchez Pizjuan

5 March 1988 26	Real Madrid	2–0	Español	Madrid
	Michel 51'; Sánchez 87'	Report		Stadium: Santiago Bernabéu; Referee: Juan Andújar Oliver

8 March 1988 27	Valencia	1–1	Real Madrid	Valencia
	Gomez 71'	Report	Santillana 50'	Stadium: Luis Casanova; Referee: Victoriano Sanchez Arminio

11 March 1988 28	Real Madrid	5–0	Athletic Bilbao	Madrid
	Santillana 10', 80'; Michel 26', 33'; Sánchez 87'	Report		Stadium: Santiago Bernabéu

19 March 1988 29	Atlético Madrid	1–3	Real Madrid	Madrid
	Setien 81'	Report	Gordillo 23'; Sánchez 34'; Butragueño 74'	Stadium: Vicente Calderón; Referee: Jose Perez Sanchez

26 March 1988 30	Real Madrid	3–1	Sabadell	Madrid
	Sánchez 33' (pen.), 42'; Butragueño 68'	Report	Rubio 61'	Stadium: Santiago Bernabéu; Referee: Jose Benavente Garasa

1 April 1988 31	Mallorca	0–2	Real Madrid	Palma de Mallorca
		Report	Michel 29'; Butragueño 86'	Stadium: de Son Moix; Referee: Angel Calvo Cordova

9 April 1988 32	Real Madrid	2–0	Logroñés	Madrid
	Sánchez 9'; Michel 59'	Report		Stadium: Santiago Bernabéu; Referee: Juan Peralta Ibañez

15 April 1988 33	Celta Vigo	0–0	Real Madrid	Vigo
		Report		Stadium: Balaídos; Referee: Jose Merino Gonzalez

23 April 1988 34	Real Madrid	6–0	Real Betis	Madrid
	Gallego 21'; Sanchis 24'; Gordillo 35'; Michel 42', 65'; Sánchez 54'	Report		Stadium: Santiago Bernabéu

29 April 1988 35	Barcelona	2–0	Real Madrid	Barcelona
	Carrasco 1'; Lineker 70'	Report		Stadium: Camp Nou

7 May 1988 36	Real Madrid	3–1	Real Murcia	Madrid
	Aldana 23', 37'; Sanchis 79'	Report	Korac 54'	Stadium: Santiago Bernabéu

13 May 1988 37	Real Sociedad	2–2	Real Madrid	San Sebastián
	Loren 14'; Iturrino 85'	Report	Butragueño 21', 34'	Stadium: Anoeta

21 May 1988 38	Real Madrid	2–1	Real Valladolid	Madrid
	Sánchez 10'; Santillana 42'	Report	Fonseca 85'	Stadium: Santiago Bernabéu

=== Copa del Rey ===
==== Fifth round ====
10 November 1987	Sestao	0–0	Real Madrid	Sestao
21:00 CET		Report (in Spanish)		Stadium: Las Lianas; Referee: García de Loza

24 November 1987	Real Madrid	3–0 (3–0 agg.)	Sestao	Madrid
21:00 CET	Tendillo 25'; Santillana 47'; Míchel 84' (pen.)	Report (in Spanish)		Stadium: Santiago Bernabéu; Attendance: 20,000; Referee: Enríquez Negreira

==== Eightfinals ====
15 December 1987	Cádiz	1–1	Real Madrid	Cádiz
21:00 CET	José 75'	Report (in Spanish)	Sánchez 9'	Stadium: Ramón de Carranza; Referee: García de Loza

5 January 1988	Real Madrid	4–2 (5–2 agg.)	Cádiz	Madrid
21:00 CET	Sánchez 46'; Santillana 76', 88'; Llorente 90+2'	Report (in Spanish)	Cabral 60'; Navarro 72'	Stadium: Santiago Bernabéu; Attendance: 20,000; Referee: Enríquez Negreira

==== Quarter-finals ====
12 January 1988	Sabadell	3–2	Real Madrid	Sabadell
20:30 CET	Jordi Vinyals 66'; Sala 75'; Villarroya 76'	Report (in Spanish)	Sánchez 9'; Vázquez 32'	Referee: Pes Pérez

19 January 1988	Real Madrid	2–0 (a.e.t.) (4–2 agg.)	Sabadell	Madrid
21:00 CET	Santillana 78'; Llorente 94'	Report (in Spanish)		Stadium: Santiago Bernabéu; Attendance: 30,000; Referee: Valdés Sánchez

==== Semi-finals ====
10 February 1988	Real Sociedad	1–0	Real Madrid	San Sebastián
21:00 CET	Bakero 9'	Report (in Spanish)		Stadium: Anoeta; Attendance: 60,000; Referee: Merino González

17 February 1988	Real Madrid	0–4 (0–5 agg.)	Real Sociedad	Madrid
21:00 CET		Report (in Spanish)	Górriz 54'; Bakero 65', 71'; Begiristain 66'	Stadium: Estadio Santiago Bernabéu; Referee: Merino González

=== European Cup ===
==== First round ====
16 September 1987	Real Madrid (Spain)	2–0	(Italy) Napoli	Madrid
	Michel 18' (pen.); De Napoli 76' (o.g.)	Report		Stadium: Santiago Bernabéu; Attendance: 499 (Note: The match was played behind closed doors due to a UEFA ban for Real Madrid resulting from the incidents during their previous season's semi-final match against Bayern Munich.); Referee: Ioan Igna (Romania)

30 September 1987	Napoli (Italy)	1–1 (1–3 agg.)	(Spain) Real Madrid	Naples
20:30	Francini 9'	Report	Butragueño 44'	Stadium: San Paolo; Attendance: 83,231; Referee: Dieter Pauly (West Germany)

==== Second round ====
21 October 1987	Real Madrid (Spain)	2–1	(Portugal) Porto	Valencia (Note: The match was played in Valencia instead of Real Madrid's home stadium due to a UEFA stadium ban resulting from the incidents in the previous season's European Cup semifinal between Real Madrid and Bayern Munich.)
21:45	Sánchez 80'; Sanchis 90'	Report	Madjer 59'	Stadium: Luis Casanova; Attendance: 42,000; Referee: Keith Hackett (England)

4 November 1987	Porto (Portugal)	1–2 (2–4 agg.)	(Spain) Real Madrid	Porto
22:00	Sousa 23'	Report	Michel 54', 69'	Stadium: Das Antas; Attendance: 60,000; Referee: Adolf Prokop (East Germany)

==== Quarter-finals ====
2 March 1988	Bayern Munich (West Germany)	3–2	(Spain) Real Madrid	Munich
20:15	Pflugler 39'; Eder 45'; Wolhlfarth 47'	Report	Butragueño 85'; Sánchez 90'	Stadium: Olympiastadion; Attendance: 70,000; Referee: Paolo Casarin (Italy)

16 March 1988	Real Madrid (Spain)	2–0 (4–3 agg.)	(West Germany) Bayern Munich	Madrid
21:00	Janković 26'; Michel 41'	Report		Stadium: Santiago Bernabéu; Attendance: 78,000; Referee: Alexis Ponnet (Belgium)

==== Semi-finals ====
6 April 1988	Real Madrid (Spain)	1–1	(Netherlands) PSV	Madrid
21:00 CET	Sánchez 6'	Report	Linskens 19'	Stadium: Santiago Bernabéu; Attendance: 90,000; Referee: George Courtney (England)

20 April 1988	PSV (Netherlands)	0–0 (1a −1 agg.)	(Spain) Real Madrid	Eindhoven
19:30 CET		Report		Stadium: Philips Stadion; Attendance: 26,500; Referee: Bruno Galler (Switzerland)

== Statistics ==
=== Squad statistics ===
competition	points	total						DR
competition	points	G	V	N	P	Gf	Gs	DR
La Liga	62	38	28	6	4	95	26	+69
Copa del Rey	–	8	3	2	3	12	11	+1
European Cup	–	8	4	3	1	12	7	+5
Total		54	35	11	8	119	44	+75

=== Players statistics ===
No.	Pos	Nat	Player	Total		La Liga		Copa del Rey		European Cup	
No.	Pos	Nat	Player	Apps	Goals	Apps	Goals	Apps	Goals	Apps	Goals
	GK	(Spain) ESP	Buyo	51	-41	35	-23	8	-11	8	-7
	DF	(Spain) ESP	Chendo	46	1	31	1	7	0	8	0
	DF	(Spain) ESP	Tendillo	51	6	36	4	7	1	8	1
	DF	(Spain) ESP	Sanchís	49	10	33	9	8	0	8	1
	DF	(Spain) ESP	Camacho	42	0	26+4	0	7+1	0	3+1	0
	MF	(Spain) ESP	Vázquez	50	6	35	5	8	1	7	0
	MF	(Spain) ESP	Míchel	50	19	35	14	7	1	8	4
	MF	(Socialist Federal Republic of Yugoslavia) YUG	Janković	43	4	22+7	3	5+1	0	6+2	1
	MF	(Spain) ESP	Gordillo	46	6	35	6	3	0	8	0
	FW	(Mexico) MEX	Sanchez	50	35	36	29	7	3	7	3
	FW	(Spain) ESP	Butragueño	43	14	32	12	3	0	8	2
	GK	(Spain) ESP	Otxotorena	2	-2	2	-2	0	0	0	0
	DF	(Spain) ESP	Solana	32	0	17+5	0	5	0	4+1	0
	MF	(Spain) ESP	Gallego	23	2	15+3	2	0	0	4+1	0
	MF	(Spain) ESP	Llorente	35	4	7+15	2	7+1	2	0+5	0
	DF	(Spain) ESP	Mino	11	0	5+1	0	2+2	0	0+1	0
	MF	(Spain) ESP	Maqueda	10	1	5+5	1				
	FW	(Spain) ESP	Santillana	23	8	3+9	4	1+6	4	1+3	0
	MF	(Spain) ESP	Aldana	4	2	3+1	2				
	GK	(Spain) ESP	Agustín	1	-1	1	-1				
	DF	(Spain) ESP	Perez	9	0	1+4	0	3+1	0		
	MF	(Spain) ESP	Aragon	1	0	1	0				
	DF	(Spain) ESP	Mandía	1	0	1	0				
	DF	(Spain) ESP	Maceda	2	0	0+2	0				
	FW	(Spain) ESP	Aguilá	1	0	0	0	0+1	0		
	FW	(Argentina) ARG	Valdano	0	0	0	0				

- Source: https://www.bdfutbol.com/en/t/t1987-882.html

== See also ==
La Quinta del Buitre
