= France at the 2012 Summer Paralympics =

- IPC code: FRA
- NPC: French Paralympic and Sports Committee
- Website: france-paralympique.fr

in London
- Competitors: 164 in 16 sports
- Medals Ranked 16th: Gold 8 Silver 19 Bronze 18 Total 45

Summer Paralympics appearances (overview)
- 1960; 1964; 1968; 1972; 1976; 1980; 1984; 1988; 1992; 1996; 2000; 2004; 2008; 2012; 2016; 2020; 2024

France competed at the 2012 Summer Paralympics in London, United Kingdom, from 29 August to 9 September 2012.

== Medalists ==
Medal	Name	Sport	Event
Gold	Marie-Amélie Le Fur	Athletics	Women's 100m T44
Gold	Mandy François-Elie	Athletics	Women's 100m T37
Gold	Assia El Hannouni	Athletics	Women's 200m T12
Gold	Assia El Hannouni	Athletics	Women's 400m T12
Gold	Souhad Ghazouani	Powerlifting	Women's 67.5kg
Gold	Cedric Fevre-Chevalier	Shooting	Mixed 10 m air rifle prone SH1
Gold	Charles Rozoy	Swimming	Men's 100m butterfly S8
Gold	Élodie Lorandi	Swimming	Women's 400m freestyle S10
Silver	Arnaud Assoumani	Athletics	Men's long jump F46
Silver	Arnaud Assoumani	Athletics	Men's triple jump F46
Silver	Tony Falelavaki	Athletics	Men's javelin throw F44
Silver	Marie-Amelie le Fur	Athletics	Women's 200m T44
Silver	Nathalie Benoit	Rowing	Women's single sculls
Silver	Perle Bouge; Stephane Tardieu	Rowing	Mixed double sculls
Silver	Raphael Voltz	Shooting	Mixed 10 m air rifle prone SH2
Silver	David Smetanine	Swimming	Men's 50m freestyle S4
Silver	David Smetanine	Swimming	Men's 200m freestyle S4
Silver	Élodie Lorandi	Swimming	Women's 100m freestyle S10
Silver	Jean-Francois Ducay	Table tennis	Men's individual - Class 1
Silver	Thu Kamkasomphou	Table tennis	Women's individual – Class 8
Silver	Romain Noble	Wheelchair fencing	Men's épée A
Silver	Marc Andre Cratere	Wheelchair fencing	Men's sabre B
Silver	Alim Latreche; Ludovic Lemoine; Damien Tokatlian	Wheelchair fencing	Men's team
Silver	Stéphane Houdet	Wheelchair tennis	Men's singles
Silver	Frederic Cattaneo; Nicolas Peifer	Wheelchair tennis	Men's doubles
Bronze	Gauthier Tresor Makunda	Athletics	Men's 400m T11
Bronze	Julien Casoli	Athletics	Men's 5000m T54
Bronze	Thierry Cibone	Athletics	Men's shot put F34
Bronze	Julien Casoli	Athletics	Men's 5000 m
Bronze	Nantenin Keita	Athletics	Women's 100m T13
Bronze	Marie-Amélie Le Fur	Athletics	Women's long jump F42-44
Bronze	Joël Jeannot	Cycling	Men's road race H3
Bronze	Laurent Thirionet	Cycling	Men's individual pursuit C2
Bronze	David Smetanine	Swimming	Men's 100m freestyle S4
Bronze	Élodie Lorandi	Swimming	Women's 50m freestyle S10
Bronze	Élodie Lorandi	Swimming	Women's 100m butterfly S10
Bronze	Fabien Lamirault	Table tennis	Men's individual - Class 2
Bronze	Pascal Pereira-Leal	Table tennis	Men's individual - Class 11
Bronze	Yann Guilhem; Florian Merrien; Jean-Philippe Robin	Table tennis	Men's team - Class 3
Bronze	Émeric Martin; Gregory Rosec; Nicolas Savant-Aira; Maxime Thomas	Table tennis	Men's team - Class 4-5
Bronze	Isabelle Lafaye-Marziou	Table tennis	Women's individual – Class 1-2
Bronze	Alim Latreche	Wheelchair fencing	Men's épée B
Bronze	Stéphane Houdet; Michael Jeremiasz	Wheelchair tennis	Men's doubles

== Archery ==
Men

Athlete	Event	Ranking round		Round of 32	Round of 16	Quarterfinals	Semifinals	Finals	
Athlete	Event	Score	Seed	Opposition score	Opposition score	Opposition score	Opposition score	Opposition score	Rank
Maurice Champey	Men's individual compound	653	11	Haudoin (FRA); L 1-7	Did not advance				
Franck Haudoin	Men's individual compound	630	22	Champey (FRA); W 7-1	Kascak (SVK); L 2-6	Did not advance			
Alexandre Lasvenes	Men's individual recurve standing	613	7	Bye	Chayka (UKR); L 3-7	Did not advance			
Joel Perrot	Men's individual recurve standing	614	6	Bye	Bennett (USA); L 5-6	Did not advance			

Women

Athlete	Event	Ranking round		Round of 32	Round of 16	Quarterfinals	Semifinals	Finals	
Athlete	Event	Score	Seed	Opposition score	Opposition score	Opposition score	Opposition score	Opposition score	Rank
Brigitte Duboc	Women's individual recurve standing	470	17	Wojciechowsha (POL); W 6-2	Gao F (CHN); L 0-6	Did not advance			

== Athletics ==
Men's track

Athlete	Events	Heat		Semifinal		Final	
Athlete	Events	Time	Rank	Time	Rank	Time	Rank
Jean-Baptiste Alaize	100m T44	12.11	12	Did not advance			
Jean-Baptiste Alaize	200m T44	24.42	12	Did not advance			
Arnaud Assoumani	100m T46	DNS		Did not advance			
Julien Casoli	800m T54	1:37.76	3 Q	—N/a		DNF	
Julien Casoli	1500m T54	3:15.18	12	Did not advance			
Julien Casoli	5000m T54	10:56.53	1 Q	—N/a		10:08.07	3rd place, bronze medalist(s)
Julien Casoli	Marathon T54	—N/a				DNS	
Hyacinthe Deleplace; Guide: Edgar Onezou	200m T12	DSQ		Did not advance			
Hyacinthe Deleplace; Guide: Edgar Onezou	400m T12	51.09 PB	7 q	51.40	7	Did not advance	
Pierre Fairbank	200m T53	27.52	13	Did not advance			
Pierre Fairbank	400m T53	52.23	9	Did not advance			
Pierre Fairbank	800m T53	1:46.47	8 Q	—N/a		1:43.02	7
Pierre Fairbank	Marathon T54	—N/a				DNF	
Alain Fuss	5000m T54	11:32.90	19	Did not advance			
Alain Fuss	Men's marathon T54	—N/a				1:39:28	18
Clavel Kayitare	100m T42	12.59 PB	5 Q	—N/a		12.73	5
Clavel Kayitare	200m T42	—N/a				26.22	6
Denis Lemeunier	5000m T54	11:30.95	16	Did not advance			
Denis Lemeunier	Marathon T54	—N/a				1:33:07	14
Gauthier Tresor Makunda; Guide: Antoine Laneyrie	200m T11	23.67 PB	9 q	DSQ		Did not advance	
Gauthier Tresor Makunda; Guide: Antoine Laneyrie	400m T11	52.08 PB	4 q	—N/a		52.45	3rd place, bronze medalist(s)
Djamel Mastouri	800m T37	—N/a				2:23.66	9
Djamel Mastouri	1500m T37	—N/a				4:27.02	8
Sebastien Mobre	100m T34	16.88	6 q	—N/a		16.73	5
Sebastien Mobre	200m T34	29.42 =PB	4 Q	—N/a		30.67	7
Arnaud Assoumani; Alain Akakpo; Jean-Baptiste Alaize; Clavel Kayitare	4x100m relay T42-46	—N/a				DSQ	

Men's field

Athlete	Events	Mark	Points	Rank
Alain Akakpo	Long jump F46	6.46	-	4
Jean-Baptiste Alaize	Long jump F42-44	6.19	762	7
Arnaud Assoumani	Long jump F46	7.13	-	2nd place, silver medalist(s)
Arnaud Assoumani	Triple jump F46	14.28	-	2nd place, silver medalist(s)
Thierry Cibone	Discus throw F32-33-34	38.22	906	11
Thierry Cibone	Javelin throw F33-34	36.20	-	4
Thierry Cibone	Shot put F34	12.86	-	3rd place, bronze medalist(s)
Damien Rumeau	Shot put F20	11.36	-	11
Soselito Sekeme	Shot put F46	13.91	-	6
Jean Pierre Talatini	Javelin throw F33-34	26.75	-	11
Jean Pierre Talatini	Shot put F34	10.18	-	13

Women's track

Athlete	Events	Heat		Semifinal		Final	
Athlete	Events	Time	Rank	Time	Rank	Time	Rank
Assia El Hannouni; Guide: Gautier Simounet	100 m T12	12.52 PB	5 q	12.34 PB	2	Did not advance	
Assia El Hannouni; Guide: Gautier Simounet	200m T12	24.80 WR	1 Q	—N/a		24.46 WR	1st place, gold medalist(s)
Assia El Hannouni; Guide: Gautier Simounet	400m T12	55.04 PB	1 Q	55.50	1 Q	55.39	1st place, gold medalist(s)
Mandy Francois-Elie	100m T37	14.30	1 Q	—N/a		14.08	1st place, gold medalist(s)
Mandy Francois-Elie	400m T37	1:16.29	9	Did not advance			
Nantenin Keita	100 m T13	12.71 SB	3 Q	—N/a		12.47	3rd place, bronze medalist(s)
Nantenin Keita	400m T13	—N/a				57.64	4
Marie-Amelie Le Fur	100m T44	13.40	2 Q	—N/a		13.26	1st place, gold medalist(s)
Marie-Amelie Le Fur	200m T44	27.49	2 Q	—N/a		26.76	2nd place, silver medalist(s)
Orianne Lopez	100m T42	—N/a				18.80	9

Women's field

Athlete	Events	Mark	Points	Rank
Marie-Amelie Le Fur	Long jump F42/44	5.14	1010	3rd place, bronze medalist(s)
Evelyne Tuitavake	Discus throw F57/58	20.94	319	16
Evelyne Tuitavake	Javelin throw F57/58	18.27	506	15
Evelyne Tuitavake	Shot put F57/58	8.09	717	11
Rose Welepa	Shot put F11/12	9.89	766	15

== Cycling ==
Men's road

Athlete	Event	Time	Rank
Damien Debeaupuits; Guide: Alexis Febvay	Road race B	DNF	
Damien Debeaupuits; Guide: Alexis Febvay	Road time trial B	31:38.75	5
Olivier Donval; Guide: John Saccomandi	Road race B	2:27:51	6
Olivier Donval; Guide: John Saccomandi	Road time trial B	32:17.51	10
Quentin Aubague	Mixed road race	58:12	9
Quentin Aubague	Mixed road time trial	14:30.96	4
Rodolph Cecillon	Road time trial H1	39:03.74	5
David Franek	Road race H2	1:52:12	11
David Franek	Road time trial H2	29:56.61	8
Jacky Galletaud	Road race C1-3	1:42:56	13
Jacky Galletaud	Road time trial C3	24:59.52	9
Joel Jeannot	Road race H3	1:53:37	3rd place, bronze medalist(s)
Joel Jeannot	Road time trial H3	27:51.96	5
Cedric Ramassamy	Road race C4-5	2:01:30	17
Cedric Ramassamy	Road time trial C5	37:30.89	14
Laurent Thirionet	Road race C1-3	1:42:58	14
Laurent Thirionet	Road time trial C2	24:57.83	4

Men's track

Athlete	Event	Qualification		1st round		Final	
Athlete	Event	Time	Rank	Time	Rank	Opposition Time	Rank
Laurent Thirionet	Individual pursuit C2	3:52.955	3 q	—N/a		Lynch (IRL); W 3:53.547	3rd place, bronze medalist(s)

Women's road

Athlete	Event	Time	Rank
Martine Chaudier; Guide: Laure Girard	Road race B	2:15:42	10
Martine Chaudier; Guide: Laure Girard	Road time trial B	38:16.05	10
Murielle Lambert	Road race H1-3	Lapped	
Murielle Lambert	Road time trial H3	45:38.01	8

== Equestrian ==
Individual

Athlete	Horse	Event	Total	
Athlete	Horse	Event	Score	Rank
Nathalie Bizet	Rubica III	Ind. champ. test grade IV	67.581	10
Nathalie Bizet	Rubica III	Ind. freestyle test grade IV	73.500	7
Jose Letartre	Warina	Ind. champ. test grade III	67.800	6
Jose Letartre	Warina	Ind. freestyle test grade III	72.600	6
Valerie Salles	Menzana d'Hulm	Ind. champ. test grade Ib	68.087	8
Valerie Salles	Menzana d'Hulm	Ind. freestyle test grade Ib	67.900	9
Vladimir Vinchon	Flipper d'Or	Ind. champ. test grade III	67.433	7
Vladimir Vinchon	Flipper d'Or	Ind. freestyle test grade III	68.300	7

Team

Athlete	Horse	Event	Individual score			Total	
Athlete	Horse	Event	TT	CT	Total	Score	Rank
Nathalie Bizet	See above	Team	67.281	67.581	134.862	411.523	9
Jose Letartre	See above	Team	69.370	67.800	137.170*	411.523	9
Valerie Salles	See above	Team	69.500	68.087	137.587*	411.523	9
Vladimir Vinchon	See above	Team	69.333	67.433	136.766*	411.523	9

* Indicates that score counts in team total

== Football 5-a-side ==
France has qualified for the football 5-a-side tournament.

The following is the France squad in the football 5-a-side tournament of the 2012 Summer Paralympics.

No.	Pos.	Player	Age	Club
1	GK	Jonathan Grangier	24	Unadev Bordeaux
4	FW	Gaël Rivière	22	Cecifoot St Mande
5	DF	Hakim Arezki	29	Cecifoot St Mande
6	FW	Martin Baron	25	Cecifoot St Mande
7	DF	Abderrahim Maya	36	Unadev Bordeaux
8	MF	David Labarre	24	Unadev Bordeaux
9	FW	Arnaud Ayax	26	Unadev Toulouse
10	FW	Frédéric Villeroux	29	Unadev Bordeaux
11	DF	Yvan Wouandji	19	AVH Paris
12	GK	Frédéric Jannas	38	Cecifoot Saint Priest

Group play

Pos	Team	Pld	W	D	L	GF	GA	GD	Pts	Qualification or relegation
1	Brazil (BRA)	3	2	1	0	5	0	+5	7	Qualified for the medal round
2	France (FRA)	3	1	2	0	1	0	+1	5	Qualified for the medal round
3	China (CHN)	3	1	1	1	4	1	+3	4	Qualified for the classification round
4	Turkey (TUR)	3	0	0	3	0	9	−9	0	Qualified for the classification round

31 August 2012
9:00

Brazil	0–0	France
	Report

Riverbank Arena
Attendance: 1,202
Referee: Mariano Travaglino (Argentina)

2 September 2012
11:00

France	0–0	China
	Report

Riverbank Arena
Attendance: 1,554
Referee: Paul Leversuch (Great Britain)

4 September 2012
11:00

France	1–0	Turkey
Labarre 4' (pen.)	Report

Riverbank Arena
Attendance: 1,421
Referee: Mariano Travaglino (Argentina)

Semi-finals

6 September 2012
13:30

Spain	0–2	France
	Report	Villeroux 23', 49'

Riverbank Arena
Attendance: 1,796
Referee: Lucio Morgado (Brazil)

Gold medal match

8 September 2012
16:00

France	0–2	Brazil
	Report	Severino 22' (pen.); Baron 42' (o.g.)

Riverbank Arena
Attendance: 1,990
Referee: Mariano Travaglino (Argentina)

== Judo ==
Men

Athlete	Event	Preliminary	Quarterfinals	Semifinals	Repechage round 1	Repechage round 2	Final/ Bronze medal contest
Athlete	Event	Opposition Result	Opposition Result	Opposition Result	Opposition Result	Opposition Result	Opposition Result
Kevin Villemont	Men's 60kg	—N/a	Ibrahimov (AZE); L 0001-0200	Did not advance			
Olivier Cugnon de Sevricourt	Men's 90kg	Crockett (USA); L 0000-0011	Did not advance				
Julien Taurines	Men's +100kg	—N/a	Walby (CAN); L 0000-1000	Did not advance			

Women

Athlete	Event	Quarterfinals	Semifinals	Repechage	Final/ Bronze medal contest
Athlete	Event	Opposition Result	Opposition Result	Opposition Result	Opposition Result
Solene Laclau	Women's 48kg	Lee K-L (TPE); L 0001–0100	—N/a	Huang X (CHN); L 0002-0240	Did not advance
Sandrine Martinet	Women's 52kg	Nikolaychyk (UKR); W 0011-0000	Wang L (CHN); L 0011-0102	—N/a	M Ferreira (BRA); L 0000-0100
Marion Coadou	Women's 57 kg	Sultanova (AZE); L 0000-0100	—N/a	Yoneda (JPN); W 0100-0000	Merenciano Herrero (ESP); L 0002-1011
Celine Manzuoli	Women's +70kg	Kalyanova (RUS); W 0101-0000	Akin (TUR); L 0000-0100	—N/a	Bouazoug (ALG); L 0002-0230

== Powerlifting ==
Men

Athlete	Event	Result	Rank
Patrick Ardon	Men's 48 kg	146.0	6
Souhad Ghazouani	Women's 67.5 kg	146.0 PR	1st place, gold medalist(s)

== Rowing ==
Athlete	Event	Heats		Repechage		Final	
Athlete	Event	Time	Rank	Time	Rank	Time	Rank
Nathalie Benoit	Women's single sculls	5:39.15	2 R	5:44.30	1 FA	5:43.56	2nd place, silver medalist(s)
Perle Bouge; Stephane Tardieu	Mixed double sculls	4:00.00	1 FA	Bye		4:03.06	2nd place, silver medalist(s)
Antoine Jesel; Stephanie Merle; Corinne Simon; Remy Taranto; Melanie Lelievre (cox)	Mixed coxed four	3:32.25	4 R	3:28.40	3 FB	3:32.01	2

== Sailing ==
Athlete	Event	Race											Net points	Rank
Athlete	Event	1	2	3	4	5	6	7	8	9	10	11*	Net points	Rank
Damien Seguin	2.4 mR – 1 person keelboat	1	(17); DSQ	4	4	10	2	13	5	3	2	—N/a	44	4
Bruno Jourdren; Eric Flageul; Nicolas Vimont Vicary	Sonar – 3 person keelboat	2	5	1	(15); DSQ	10	2	10	7	2	3	—N/a	42	4

* Due to a lack of wind Race 11 was cancelled

== Shooting ==
Athlete	Event	Qualification		Final	
Athlete	Event	Score	Rank	Score	Rank
Cédric Fèvre-Chevalier	Men's 50 m rifle 3 rositions SH1	1133	7 Q	1226.7	7
Delphine Fischer	Women's 50 m rifle 3 positions SH1	527	13	Did not advance	
Delphine Fischer	Women's 10 m air rifle standing SH1	382	14	Did not advance	
Cédric Fèvre-Chevalier	Mixed 50 m rifle prone SH1	587	11	Did not advance	
Delphine Fischer	Mixed 50 m rifle prone SH1	570	43	Did not advance	
Cédric Fèvre-Chevalier	Mixed 10 m air rifle prone SH1	600 EWR	=1 Q	706.7 FWR	1st place, gold medalist(s)
Tanguy de la Forest	Mixed 10 m air rifle prone SH2	599	11	Did not advance	
Cedric Rio	Mixed 10 m air rifle prone SH2	598	20	Did not advance	
Raphaël Voltz	Mixed 10 m air rifle prone SH2	600 EWR	=1 Q	705.9; S-O: 10.5	2nd place, silver medalist(s)
Tanguy de la Forest	Mixed 10 m air rifle standing SH2	600 EWR	=1 Q	703.8	5
Cedric Rio	Mixed 10 m air rifle standing SH2	596	18	Did not advance	
Raphaël Voltz	Mixed 10 m air rifle standing SH2	598; S-O: 52.7	6 Q	702.5	8

== Swimming ==
Men

Athletes	Event	Heats		Final	
Athletes	Event	Time	Rank	Time	Rank
Frederic Bussi	50m backstroke S3	1:01.31	11	Did not advance	
Sami El Gueddari	50m freestyle S9	26.39	4 Q	26.32	5
Sami El Gueddari	100m freestyle S9	59.17	11	Did not advance	
Charles Rozoy	50m freestyle S8	27.77	6 Q	27.80	8
Charles Rozoy	100m freestyle S8	1:02.59	9	Did not advance	
Charles Rozoy	100m butterfly S8	1:01.18 EU	1 Q	1:01.24	1st place, gold medalist(s)
Charles Rozoy	200m individual medley SM8	2:31.53	5 Q	2:28.27	5
David Smetanine	50m freestyle S4	38.97	2 Q	38.75	2nd place, silver medalist(s)
David Smetanine	100m freestyle S4	1:24.66	1 Q	1:25.76	3rd place, bronze medalist(s)
David Smetanine	200m freestyle S4	3:03.82	2 Q	3:01.38	2nd place, silver medalist(s)
David Smetanine	50m backstroke S4	49.33	6 Q	50.30	6

Women

Athletes	Event	Heats		Final	
Athletes	Event	Time	Rank	Time	Rank
Stephanie Douard	50m freestyle S11	36.41	14	Did not advance	
Stephanie Douard	100m backstroke S11	1:28.98	11	Did not advance	
Stephanie Douard	100m breaststroke SB11	1:35.57	4 Q	1:36.50	6
Stephanie Douard	200m individual medley SM11	3:12.09	8 Q	3:12.44	8
Anita Fatis	50m freestyle S5	DNS		Did not advance	
Anita Fatis	100m freestyle S5	1:25.05	4 Q	1:24.34	5
Anita Fatis	200m freestyle S5	3:02.70	3 Q	3:03.81	4
Elodie Lorandi	50m freestyle S10	28.95	3 Q	28.67	3rd place, bronze medalist(s)
Elodie Lorandi	100m freestyle S10	1:01.87	2 Q	1:01.09 EU	2nd place, silver medalist(s)
Elodie Lorandi	400m freestyle S10	4:42.86	2 Q	4:34.55	1st place, gold medalist(s)
Elodie Lorandi	100m butterfly S10	1:11.39	5 Q	1:09.08	3rd place, bronze medalist(s)
Alicia Mandin	200m freestyle S14	2:41.50	19	Did not advance	
Alicia Mandin	100m breaststroke SB14	1:25.62	8 Q	1:25.51	8
Anaelle Roulet	400m freestyle S10	4:57.85	7 Q	5:00.20	7
Anaelle Roulet	100m backstroke S10	1:14.16	8 Q	1:13.97	8

== Table tennis ==
The French table tennis competitors failed to win a gold medal in men's, women's and teams' events for the first time since 1980: they won two silvers and three bronze medals. However, they had the second most players compete since 2004.

Men

Athlete	Event	Preliminaries			Quarterfinals	Semifinals	Final / BM	
Athlete	Event	Opposition Result	Opposition Result	Rank	Opposition Result	Opposition Result	Opposition Result	Rank
Jean-François Ducay	Men's singles C1	Quinlan (IRL); W 3-0	R Davies (GBR); W 3-2	1 Q	—N/a	Lee CH (KOR); W 3-0	Nikelis (GER); L 1-3	2nd place, silver medalist(s)
Jerome Guezenec	Men's singles C1	Lee CH (KOR); L 3-1	Eberhardt (ARG); L 2-3	3	Did not advance			
Vincent Boury	Men's singles C2	Ludrovsky (SVK); W 3-1	Rooney (IRL); W 3-0	1 Q	Poddubnyy (RUS); L 0-3	Did not advance		
Fabien Lamirault	Men's singles C2	Suchánek (CZE); W 3-1	Souza (BRA); W 3-2	1 Q	Kim MG (KOR); W 3-0	Riapoš (SVK); L 0-3	Poddubnyy (RUS); W 3-2	3rd place, bronze medalist(s)
Stephane Molliens	Men's singles C2	Poddubnyy (RUS); W 3-1	Revucky (SVK); L 0-3	3	Did not advance			
Yann Guilhem	Men's singles C3	Schmidberger (GER); L 0-3	Kim JS (KOR); L 1-3	3	Did not advance			
Florian Merrien	Men's singles C3	Copola (ARG); W 3-1	Geva (ISR); W 3-0	1 Q	Breuchle (GER); W 3-1	Feng (CHN); L 0-3	Schmidberger (GER); L 1-3	4
Jean-Philippe Robin	Men's singles C3	Ko HY (HKG); W 3-2	Oluade (NGR); W 3-0	1 Q	Schmidberger (GER); L 1-3	Did not advance		
Emeric Martin	Men's singles C4	Kim JG (KOR); W 3-1	Ko K-n (TPE); W 3-0	1 Q	Kim YG (KOR); L 0-3	Did not advance		
Maxime Thomas	Men's singles C4	Spalj (CRO); W 3-2	Burkhardt (GER); W 3-0	1 Q	Ozturk (TUR); W 3-1	Zhang Y (CHN); L 1-3	Saleh (EGY); L 1-3	4
Gregory Rosec	Men's singles C5	Cetin (GER); W 3-1	Kim BY (KOR); W 3-1	1 Q	—N/a	Cao (CHN); L 1-3	Jun (KOR); L 0-3	4
Nicolas Savant-Aira	Men's singles C5	Urhaug (NOR); L 0-3	Segatto (BRA); W 3-2	2	Did not advance			
Thomas Fernandez	Men's singles C6	Chen (CHN); L 0-3	Itai (JPN); W 3-2	2	Did not advance			
Bastien Grundeler	Men's singles C6	Bye			Alecci (ITA); W 3-0	Valera (ESP); L 0-3	Rosenmeier (DEN); L 1-3	4
Kevin Dourbecker	Men's singles C7	Morales (ESP); L 1-3	Schwinn (GER); L 1-3	3	Did not advance			
Stephane Messi	Men's singles C7	Horut (CZE); W 3-0	Scazzieri (ITA); W 3-0	1 Q	Nikolenko (UKR); L 0-3	Did not advance		
Frederic Bellais	Men's singles C9	Miettinen (FIN); W 3-2	Adisa (NGR); W 3-1	1 Q	Ma L (CHN); L 0-3	Did not advance		
Thomas Bouvais	Men's singles C9	Kubov (UKR); W 3-2	Zhi LK (MAS); W 3-2	1 Q	Last (NED); L 1-3	Did not advance		
Cedrik Cabestany	Men's singles C9	Leibovitz (USA); W 3-1	Karlsson (SWE); W 3-2	1 Q	Shchepanskyy (UKR); W 3-1	Ma L (CHN); L 0-3	Last (NED); L 1-3	4
Pascal Pereira-Leal	Men's singles C11	Olejarski (POL); W 3-0	Maciel (BRA); W 3-0	1 Q	—N/a	Palos (HUN); L 1-3	Olejarski (POL); W 3-0	3rd place, bronze medalist(s)

Women

Athlete	Event	Preliminaries				Semifinals	Final / BM	
Athlete	Event	Opposition Result	Opposition Result	Opposition Result	Rank	Opposition Result	Opposition Result	Rank
Isabelle Lafaye Marziou	Women's singles C1-2	McCarron Rooney (IRL); W 3-1	Al-Bargouti (JOR); W 3-0	—N/a	1 Q	Liu J (CHN); L 1-3	Pushpasheva (RUS); W 3-2	3rd place, bronze medalist(s)
Florence Sireau	Women's singles C1-2	Pezzutto (ITA); L 2-3	Breathnach (IRL); W 3-2	—N/a	2	Did not advance		
Fanny Bertrand	Women's singles C3	Mader (AUT); L 2-3	Wararitdamrongkul (THA); W 3-0	—N/a	2	Did not advance		
Marie-Christine Fillou	Women's singles C3	Pintar (SLO); L 2-3	Duman (TUR); W 3-1	—N/a	2	Did not advance		
Fanny Barneoud	Women's singles C7	van Zon (NED); L 1-3	Ocsoy (TUR); L 1-3	Munoz (ARG); W 3-1	3	Did not advance		
Thu Kamkasomphou	Women's singles C8	Abrahamsson (SWE); W 3-0	Yu H (CHN); W 3-1	Mahmoud (EGY); W 3-0	1 Q	Medina (PHI); W 3-0	Mao (CHN); L 1-3	2nd place, silver medalist(s)
Claire Mairie	Women's singles C9	Liu M (CHN); L 0-3	Gorshkaleva (RUS); W 3-1	Jankowska (POL); W 3-0	2 Q	Lei L (CHN); L 0-3	Liu M (CHN); L 1-3	4
Audrey Le Morvan	Women's singles C10	Fan (CHN); L 0-3	Tapper (AUS); L 0-3	Alexandre (BRA); L 1-3	4	Did not advance		

Teams

Athlete	Event	First round	Quarterfinals	Semifinals	Final / BM	
Athlete	Event	Opposition Result	Opposition Result	Opposition Result	Opposition Result	Rank
Vincent Boury; Stephane Molliens; Fabien Lamirault	Men's team C1-2	—N/a	Ireland (IRL); W 3-0	South Korea (KOR); W 3-2	Slovakia (SVK); L 0-3	2nd place, silver medalist(s)
Florian Merrien; Jean-Philippe Robin	Men's team C3	—N/a	Spain (ESP); W 3-1	Germany (GER); L 0-3	South Korea (KOR); W 3-1	3rd place, bronze medalist(s)
Emeric Martin; Gregory Rosec; Nicolas Savant-Aira; Maxime Thomas	Men's team C4-5	—N/a	Israel (ISR); W 3-0	China (CHN); L 2-3	Chinese Taipei (TPE); W 3-0	3rd place, bronze medalist(s)
Kevin Dourbecker; Stephane Messi	Men's team C6-8	Belgium (BEL); L 2-3	Did not advance			
Thomas Bouvais; Cedrik Cabestany	Men's team C9-10	Sweden (SWE); L 2-3	Did not advance			
Fanny Bertrand; Marie-Christine Fillou	Women's team C1-3	United States (USA); W 3-1	China (CHN); L 1-3	Did not advance		
Claire Mairie; Audrey le Morvan	Women's team C6-10	Bye	Australia (AUS); W 3-2	China (CHN); L 0-3	Poland (POL); L 2-3	4

== Wheelchair basketball ==
=== Men's tournament ===
France qualified for the men's team event in wheelchair basketball by finishing second at the 2010 Wheelchair Basketball World Championship. Competing athletes are given an eight-level-score specific to wheelchair basketball, ranging from 0.5 to 4.5 with lower scores representing a higher degree of disability. The sum score of all players on the court cannot exceed 14.

Group B

Team	Pld	W	L	PF	PA	PD	Pts	Qualification
Germany	4	4	0	254	158	+96	8	Quarter-finals
United States	4	3	1	246	176	+70	7	Quarter-finals
China	4	2	2	240	204	+36	6	Quarter-finals
Mexico	4	1	3	157	230	−73	5	Quarter-finals
France	4	0	4	132	261	−129	4	Eliminated

30 August 2012
15:15

Report

United States	63–24	France
Scoring by quarter: 20–4, 21–4, 14–10, 8–6
Pts: Murray 23; Rebs: Nichols 6 Asts: Nichols 5		Pts: Quemener-Pichon 7 Rebs: Belz 9 Asts: Glemp-Etavard, Mathias 2

North Greenwich Arena, London
Referees: Carsten Rehling (GER)

31 August 2012
20:45

Report

China	72–34	France
Scoring by quarter: 21–6, 20–8, 13–12, 18–8
Pts: Cheng 20; Rebs: Cheng 10; Asts: Long 6		Pts: Saint-Omer-Delépine 13; Rebs: Saint-Omer-Delépine 6 Asts: Glemp-Etavard 4

Basketball Arena, London
Referees: Darrell Hargreaves (USA)

1 September 2012
15:15

Report

France	32–76	Germany
Scoring by quarter: 14–20, 8–15, 5–19, 5–22
Pts: Quemener-Pichon 12; Rebs: Saint-Omer Delépine 12; Asts: Ménard 3		Pts: Mohnen 23; Rebs: Friedrich 6 Asts: Zeyen 8

North Greenwich Arena, London
Referees: Stacy Gomm (RSA)

2 September 2012
13:00

Report

Mexico	50–42	France
Scoring by quarter: 13–12, 13–8, 11–6, 13–16
Pts: Vázquez Delgadillo 18; Rebs: Estrada Bernal 13; Asts: Pérez Pacheco 8		Pts: Quemener-Pichon 22; Rebs: Saint-Omer-Delépine 8 Asts: Glemp-Etavard 7

North Greenwich Arena, London
Referees: Philip Haines (AUS)

9th/10th place match

4 September 2012
10:45

Report

Brazil	59–35	France
Scoring by quarter: 17–10, 14–4, 15–8, 13–13
Pts: Soares Martins 45; Rebs: Guimarães Da Costa 13; Asts: Soares Martins 10		Pts: Belz, Quemener-Pichon 8 Rebs: Saint-Omer-Delépine 10; Asts: Saint-Omer-Delépine 4

North Greenwich Arena, London
Referees: Juan Uruñuela (ESP)

== Wheelchair rugby ==
Group A

Team	Pld	W	D	L	GF	GA	GD	Pts	Qualification
United States (USA)	3	3	0	0	190	136	+54	6	Semifinals
Japan (JPN)	3	2	0	1	164	159	+5	4	Semifinals
Great Britain (GBR)	3	1	0	2	140	157	−17	2	Eliminated
France (FRA)	3	0	0	3	150	192	−42	0	Eliminated

5 September 2012
21:15

Japan	65 – 56	France
	Report

Basketball Arena
Attendance: 3,642
Referee: Mitch Carr (USA), Alexander Schreiner (GER)

6 September 2012
19:00

Great Britain	57 – 50	France
	Report

Basketball Arena
Attendance: 5,186
Referee: Motoko Izumiya (JPN), Darren Roberts (USA)

7 September 2012
17:15

United States	70 – 44	France
	Report

Basketball Arena
Attendance: 6,259
Referee: Pierre-Alexandre Brière (CAN), Dave Woods (GBR)

5th–8th place semi-finals

8 September 2012
14:00

Sweden	58 – 48	France
	Report

Basketball Arena
Attendance: 2,994
Referee: Motoko Izumiya (JPN), Dave Woods (GBR)

7th/8th place match

8 September 2012
19:00

Belgium	54 – 50	France
	Report

Basketball Arena
Attendance: 1,734
Referee: Philip Washbourn (NZL), Dave Woods (GBR)

== Wheelchair tennis ==
Athlete	Event	Round of 64	Round of 32	Round of 16	Quarterfinals	Semifinals	Final	
Athlete	Event	Opposition Result	Opposition Result	Opposition Result	Opposition Result	Opposition Result	Opposition Result	Rank
Stéphane Houdet	Men's singles	Khlongrua (THA); W 6–1, 6–0	Pommê (BRA); W 6–2, 6–1	Egberink (NED); W 6–2, 6–2	Fernandez (ARG); W 6–1, 1–6, 6–1	Scheffers (NED); W 6–3, 6–2	Kunieda (JPN); L 4–6, 2–6	2nd place, silver medalist(s)
Michaël Jeremiasz	Men's singles	Perez (CHI); W 6–0, 6–0	Rydberg (USA); W 7–6, 6–1	Ammerlaan (NED); W 4–6, 6–0, 6–3	Kunieda (JPN); L 0–6, 2–6	Did not advance		
Nicolas Peifer	Men's singles	Adewale (NGR); W 6–0, 6–1	Jaroszewski (POL); W 6–1, 6–1	Gérard (BEL); L 3–6, 6–2, 5–7	Did not advance			
Frederic Cattaneo	Men's singles	Dissanayaka (SRI); W 6–4, 6–0	Maripa (RSA); W 6–1, 6–4	Scheffers (NED); L 0–6, 2–6	Did not advance			
Stéphane Houdet; Michaël Jeremiasz	Men's doubles	—N/a	Bye	Jewitt, Phillipson (GBR); W 6–0, 6–2	Kunieda, Saida (JPN); W 6–3, 6–1	Olsson, Vikström (SWE); L 1–6, 6–7	Bronze-medal match Ammerlaan, Vink (NED); W 6–0, 6–0	3rd place, bronze medalist(s)
Nicolas Peifer; Frederic Cattaneo	Men's doubles	—N/a	Bye	Legner, Mossier (AUT); W 6–0, 6–2	McCarroll, Reid (GBR); W 7–6, 6–4	Ammerlaan, Vink (NED); W 6–3, 6–2	Olsson, Vikström (SWE); L 1–6, 2–6	2nd place, silver medalist(s)
Christine Schoenn	Women's singles	—N/a	Ellerbrock (GER); L 3–6, 1–6	Did not advance				

== See also ==
- France at the Paralympics
- France at the 2012 Summer Olympics
