= Argentina at the 2012 Summer Paralympics =

- IPC code: ARG
- NPC: Argentine Paralympic Committee
- Website: www.coparg.org.ar

in London
- Competitors: 63 in 15 sports
- Flag bearer: Guillermo Marro
- Medals Ranked 40th: Gold 0 Silver 1 Bronze 4 Total 5

Summer Paralympics appearances (overview)
- 1960; 1964; 1968; 1972; 1976; 1980; 1984; 1988; 1992; 1996; 2000; 2004; 2008; 2012; 2016; 2020; 2024

Argentina competed in the 2012 Summer Paralympics in London, United Kingdom, from 29 August to 9 September 2012. The country's flagbearer at the Games' opening ceremony was the swimmer Guillermo Marro.

== Medallists ==
Medal	Name	Sport	Event	Date
Silver	José Effron	Judo	Men's 81 kg	31 August
Bronze	Rodrigo Fernando Lopez	Cycling	Men's individual pursuit C1	31 August
Bronze	Jorge Lencina	Judo	Men's 90 kg	1 September
Bronze	Nadia Báez	Swimming	Women's 100 m breaststroke SB11	2 September
Bronze	Hernan Barreto	Athletics	Men's 200 m T35	6 September

== Athletics ==
Men's track

Athlete	Event	Heat		Final	
Athlete	Event	Time	Rank	Time	Rank
Hernan Barreto	100 m T35	13.22	2 Q	13.26	4
Hernan Barreto	200 m T35	27.19	1 Q	26.59	3rd place, bronze medalist(s)
José Luis Santero	5000 m T12	—N/a		DQ	
José Luis Santero	Marathon T12	—N/a		3:09:09	14

Men's field

Athlete	Events	Mark	Points	Rank
Sergio Paz	Shot put F11-12	9.43	650	19
Sergio Paz	Discus throw F11	32.44	—N/a	6
Sebastian Baldassarri	Shot put F11-12	9.87	705	14
Sebastian Baldassarri	Discus throw F11	34.03	—N/a	4

Women's track

Athlete	Events	Heats		Final	
Athlete	Events	Time	Rank	Time	Rank
Yanina Andrea Martinez	100 m T36	15.01	3 Q	15.00	4
Yanina Andrea Martinez	200 m T36	31.48	3 Q	DQ	
Nadia Schaus	100 m T36	15.04	1 Q	15.14	5
Nadia Schaus	200 m T36	31.87	2 Q	DQ	

Women's field

Athlete	Events	Mark	Points	Rank
Mariela Almada	Shot put F11-12	9.72	747	17
Mariela Almada	Discus throw F11-12	36.52	843	6
Perla Amanda Munoz	Shot put F35-36	7.54	567	10
Perla Amanda Munoz	Discus throw F35-36	17.70	641	10

Key

- Note – Ranks given for track events are within the athlete's heat only
- Q = Qualified for the next round
- q = Qualified for the next round as a fastest loser or, in field events, by position without achieving the qualifying target
- NR = National record
- WB = World Best
- D/Q = Disqualified
- N/A = Round not applicable for the event
- Bye = Athlete not required to compete in round

== Boccia ==
Argentina qualified a boccia team for the BC1/BC2 team events.

Individual

Athlete	Event	Seeding matches		Round of 32	Round of 16	Quarterfinals	Semifinals	Final / BM	
Athlete	Event	Opposition Score	Rank	Opposition Score	Opposition Score	Opposition Score	Opposition Score	Opposition Score	Rank
Mauricio Ibarbure	Mixed individual BC1	BYE			Aandalen (NOR); L 1–5	did not advance			
Pablo Cortez	Mixed individual BC2	BYE		Ferreira (POR); L 4–5	did not advance				

Pairs and teams

Athlete	Event	Pool matches			Quarterfinals	Semifinals	Final / BM	
Athlete	Event	Opposition Score	Opposition Score	Rank	Opposition Score	Opposition Score	Opposition Score	Rank
Mauricio Ibarbure; Pablo Cortez; Gabriela Villano; Pablo Gonzales	Mixed team BC1–2	Portugal (POR); L 5–6	Great Britain (GBR); L 4–8	3	did not advance			

== Cycling ==
=== Road ===
Athlete	Event	Time	Rank
Alberto Lujan Nattkemper	Men's road race B	Lapped	
Alberto Lujan Nattkemper	Men's time trial B	38:23.82	16
Rodrigo Fernando Lopez	Men's road race C1-3	did not finish	
Rodrigo Fernando Lopez	Men's time trial C1	27:42.75	6

=== Track ===
Pursuit

Athlete	Event	Qualification		Final	
Athlete	Event	Time	Rank	Opposition Time	Rank
Alberto Lujan Nattkemper; Jonatan Ithurrart (pilot)	Men's individual pursuit B	5:09.568	8	did not advance	
Rodrigo Fernando Lopez	Men's individual pursuit C1	4:07.725	4 Q	Teuber (GER); W 4:04.559	3rd place, bronze medalist(s)

Sprint

Athlete	Event	Qualification		Quarterfinals	Semifinals	Final	
Athlete	Event	Time	Rank	Opposition Time	Opposition Time	Opposition Time	Rank
Alberto Lujan Nattkemper; Jonatan Ithurrart (pilot)	Men's individual sprint B	11.744	7	Fachie/Storey (GBR); L 11.659, L 12.064	did not advance		

Time trial

Athlete	Event	Time	Rank
Alberto Lujan Nattkemper; Jonatan Ithurrart (pilot)	Men's 1 km time trial B	1:11.181	11
Rodrigo Fernando Lopez	Men's 1 km time trial C1–3	1:10.689	7

== Equestrian ==
Individual

Athlete	Horse	Event	Total	
Athlete	Horse	Event	Score	Rank
Patricio Guglialmelli Lynch	Nirvana Pure Indulgence	Individual championship test grade III	60.200	11
Patricio Guglialmelli Lynch	Nirvana Pure Indulgence	Individual freestyle test grade III	62.050	10

== Football 5-a-side ==
Argentina qualified a team for the football 5-a-side event. The Argentine team qualified as they came second place at the 2011 Parapan American Games.

The following is the Argentina squad in the football 5-a-side tournament of the 2012 Summer Paralympics.

No.	Pos.	Player	Age	Club
1	GK	Dario Lencina	32	Estudiantes de la Plata
2	DF	Angel Deldo	24	Achadec de Chaco
3	MF	Federico Accardi	23	Bella Vista de Mendoza
4	MF	Froilán Padilla	33	Unión de Delviso
5	FW	Silvio Velo	41	River Plate
8	DF	Lucas Rodriguez	30	Mun. De Cordoba
9	FW	Luis Sacayan	32	Univ. De Tucuman
10	FW	David Peralta	31	Estudiantes de la Plata
11	MF	Marcelo Panizza	28	River Plate
12	GK	Guido Consoni	22	Estudiantes de la Plata

Group stage

Pos	Team	Pld	W	D	L	GF	GA	GD	Pts	Qualification
1	Spain (ESP)	3	1	2	0	3	1	+2	5	Qualified for the medal round
2	Argentina (ARG)	3	1	2	0	2	0	+2	5	Qualified for the medal round
3	Iran (IRI)	3	1	0	2	1	4	−3	3	Qualified for the classification round
4	Great Britain (GBR)	3	0	2	1	1	2	−1	2	Qualified for the classification round

31 August 2012
13:30

Iran	0–2	Argentina
	Report	Velo 27', 48'

Riverbank Arena
Attendance: 1,985
Referee: François Carcouët (France)

2 September 2012
15:30

Argentina	0–0	Great Britain
	Report

Riverbank Arena
Attendance: 2,179
Referee: François Carcouët (France)

4 September 2012
13:30

Spain	0–0	Argentina
	Report

Riverbank Arena
Attendance: 1,836
Referee: Lucio Morgado (Brazil)

Semi-finals

6 September 2012
15:45

Brazil	0–0 (a.e.t.)	Argentina
	Report
Penalties
Severino (penalty scored) dos Reis (penalty missed)	1–0	(penalty missed) Sacayan; (penalty missed) Velo; (penalty missed) Padilla

Riverbank Arena
Attendance: 2,016
Referee: François Carcouët (France)

Bronze medal match

8 September 2012
13:30

Spain	0–0 (a.e.t.)	Argentina
	Report
Penalties
Martín Gaitán (penalty scored); Rosado Carrasco (penalty missed); Giera Tejuelo (penalty missed)	1–0	(penalty missed) Rodriguez; (penalty missed) Velo; (penalty missed) Deldo

Riverbank Arena
Attendance: 1,785
Referee: Lucio Morgado (Brazil)

== Football 7-a-side ==
Argentina qualified a team for the football 7-a-side event. The Argentine team qualified as they came 7th in 2011 CPISRA Football 7-a-side World Championships held in Netherlands. The Iranian, Ukrainian and Brazilian teams (second, third and fourth place respectively) had already qualified for the 2012 Summer Paralympics games, allowing the Argentine team to win a spot at the Paralympics.

The following is the Argentina squad in the football 7-a-side tournament of the 2012 Summer Paralympics.

No.	Pos.	Player	Age	Club
1		Gustavo Nahuelquin	33	D.P.L.
2		Mariano Morana	21	Cideli
3		Rodrigo Luquez	23	Club Perico de Jujuy
4		Ezequiel Jaime	28	D.P.L.
5		Brian Vivot	20	Avida
6		Claudio Figuera	24	D.P.L.
7		Carlos Ferreyra	23	Club Lujan de Jujuy
8		Marcos Salazar Robert	29	Club Lujan de Jujuy
9		Fabio Coria	20	D.P.L.
10		Rodrigo Lugrin	18	Avida
11		Matias Fernandez Romano	28	D.P.L.
12		Sergio Gutierrez	19	Cideli

Group play

Pos	Team	Pld	W	D	L	GF	GA	GD	Pts	Qualification
1	Russia (RUS)	3	3	0	0	19	1	+18	9	Qualified for the medal round
2	Iran (IRI)	3	2	0	1	13	5	+8	6	Qualified for the medal round
3	Netherlands (NED)	3	1	0	2	5	13	−8	3	Qualified for the classification round
4	Argentina (ARG)	3	0	0	3	2	20	−18	0	Qualified for the classification round

2012-09-01
9:00

Russia	8–0	Argentina
Kuligin 9', 49'; Murvanadze 21', 30'; Ramonov 35'; Kuvaev 38', 58'; Larionov 54'	Report

Riverbank Arena
Attendance: 4,074
Referee: Stephen Conroy (GBR)

2012-09-03
14:00

Argentina	1–8	Iran
Fernández Romano 47'	Report	Gholamhosseinpour 2', 60+3'; Mehri 6', 58'; Atashafrouz 13', 14'; Bakhshi 18'; Heidari 29'

Riverbank Arena
Attendance: 10,561
Referee: Garry Polkey (GBR)

2012-09-05
11:15

Argentina	1–4	Netherlands
Morana 6'	Report	Lokhoff 11', 54'; Visker 19', 45'

Riverbank Arena
Attendance: 4,405
Referee: Scott Henry (GBR)

Semi-final for 5th–8th place

2012-09-07
11:30

Great Britain	3–4 (a.e.t.)	Argentina
Diallo 14'; Dimbylow 27'; Patrick-Heselton 78'	Report	Lugrin 29'; Vivot 40', 69', 73'

Riverbank Arena
Attendance: 9,942
Referee: Barry Huizinga (NED)

5th/6th place match

2012-09-09
11:00

Netherlands	3–0	Argentina
Visker 9', 12', 18'	Report

Riverbank Arena
Attendance: 7,490
Referee: Álvaro Azeredo Quelhas (BRA)

== Judo ==
Three Argentine judokas competed at 2012 Summer Paralympics.

Athlete	Event	Preliminaries	Quarterfinals	Semifinals	Repechage First round	Repechage Final	Final / BM	
Athlete	Event	Opposition Result	Opposition Result	Opposition Result	Opposition Result	Opposition Result	Opposition Result	Rank
Rodolfo Ramírez	Men's 73 kg	BYE	Khalilov (UZB); L 000–100	Did not advance	Briceno (VEN); L 000–102	did not advance		
José Effron	Men's 81 kg	BYE	Mirhassan Nattajsolhdar (IRI); W 0112–0012	Vazquez Cortijo (ESP); W 020–000	—N/a		Kosinov (UKR); L 0112–0122	2nd place, silver medalist(s)
Jorge Lencina	Men's 90 kg	BYE	Santos (BRA); W 100–000	Ingram (GBR); L 0003–0101	—N/a		Asakereh (IRI); W 100–0001	3rd place, bronze medalist(s)

== Powerlifting ==
Athlete	Event	Total lifted	Rank
Jose David Coronel	Men's 75 kg	150	11

== Rowing ==
Athlete	Event	Heats		Repechage		Final	
Athlete	Event	Time	Rank	Time	Rank	Time	Rank
Carlos Vysocki	Men's single sculls	5:27.94	6 R	5:32.99	5 FB	5:21.58	6

Qualification Legend: FA=Final A (medal); FB=Final B (non-medal); R=Repechage

== Sailing ==
Argentina qualified a boat for the 2.4MR class competition.

Athlete	Event	Race										Net points	Final rank
Athlete	Event	1	2	3	4	5	6	7	8	9	10	Net points	Final rank
Juan Fernández Ocampo	2.4 Metre	12	13	13	13	14	~~17~~	14	15	15	12	120	15

== Shooting ==
Athlete	Event	Qualification		Final	
Athlete	Event	Score	Rank	Score	Rank
Osvaldo Gentili	Men's 10 metre air pistol SH1	545	26	did not advance	

== Swimming ==
Argentina received 8 slots to compete at the various events at the London Aquatics Centre in London. The eight Argentine swimmers competed in various events.

Men

Athlete	Event	Heat		Final	
Athlete	Event	Time	Rank	Time	Rank
Guillermo Marro	100 m backstroke S7	1:13.97	4 Q	1:14.19	5
Matias de Andrade	100 m backstroke S7	1:16.74	12	did not advance	
Ignacio Gonzalez	100 m backstroke S12	1:05.72	7 Q	1:04.40	7
Ignacio Gonzalez	200 m individual medley SM12	2:20.76	6 Q	2:20.73	6
Ignacio Gonzalez	400 m freestyle S12	4:33.33	6 Q	4:34.38	7
Ignacio Gonzalez	100 m breaststroke SB12	1:05.72	7 Q	1:12.96	8
Ariel Quassi	50 m butterfly S5	55.19	20	did not advance	
Ariel Quassi	100 m breaststroke SB4	1:59.44	11	did not advance	
Ariel Quassi	50 m backstroke S5	49.45	17	did not advance	
Sergio Zayas	100 m backstroke S11	1:16.33	11	did not advance	
Sergio Zayas	400 m freestyle S11	5:15.46	9	did not advance	

Women

Athlete	Events	Heats		Final	
Athlete	Events	Time	Rank	Time	Rank
Nadia Báez	50 m freestyle S11	34.98	10	did not advance	
Nadia Báez	100 m freestyle S11	1:22.06	14	did not advance	
Nadia Báez	400 m freestyle S11	6:19.35	8 Q	6:15.98	8
Nadia Báez	100 m breaststroke SB11	1:32.07	2 Q	1:31.21	3rd place, bronze medalist(s)
Nadia Báez	200 m individual medley SM11	3:17.12	13	did not advance	
Daniela Gimenez	50 m freestyle S9	30.82	9	did not advance	
Daniela Gimenez	100 m breaststroke SB9	1:22.58	7 Q	1:21.99	7
Anabel Moro	50 m freestyle S12	31.32	11	did not advance	
Anabel Moro	100 m freestyle S12	1:08.79	11	did not advance	
Anabel Moro	100 m breaststroke SB12	1:23.81	5 Q	1:23.42	7

== Table tennis ==
Men

Athlete	Event	Preliminaries			Quarterfinals	Semifinals	Finals	
Athlete	Event	Opposition Result	Opposition Result	Rank	Opposition Result	Opposition Result	Opposition Result	Rank
Fernando Eberhardt	Singles C1	Lee (KOR); L 1–3	Guezenec (FRA); W 3–2	2	—N/a	did not advance		
Gabriel Copola	Singles C3	Merrien (FRA); L 1–3	Geva (ISR); W 3–0	2	did not advance			
Fernando Eberhardt; Gabriel Copola	Team C3	—N/a			Germany (GER); L 1–3	did not advance		

Women

Athlete	Event	Preliminaries				Semifinals	Finals	
Athlete	Event	Opposition Result	Opposition Result	Opposition Result	Rank	Opposition Result	Opposition Result	Rank
Marta Makishi	Singles C5	Abuawad (JOR); L 0–3	Bessho (JPN); L 0–3	—N/a	3	did not advance		
Giselle Munoz	Singles C7	van Zon (NED); L 1–3	Barneoud (FRA); L 1–3	Öçsoy (TUR); L 0–3	4	did not advance		

== Wheelchair fencing ==
Athlete	Event	Qualification			Round of 16	Quarterfinal	Semifinal	Final / BM	
Athlete	Event	Opposition	Score	Rank	Opposition Score	Opposition Score	Opposition Score	Opposition Score	Rank
Jose Palavecino	Men's individual foil B	Bezyazychny (BLR)	L 0–5	15	did not advance				
Jose Palavecino	Men's individual foil B	Czop (POL)	L 2–5	15	did not advance				
Jose Palavecino	Men's individual foil B	Yusupov (RUS)	L 0–5	15	did not advance				
Jose Palavecino	Men's individual foil B	François (FRA)	L 0–5	15	did not advance				
Jose Palavecino	Men's individual épée B	Ali (IRQ)	L 0–5	15	did not advance				
Jose Palavecino	Men's individual épée B	Estep (USA)	L 3–5	15	did not advance				
Jose Palavecino	Men's individual épée B	Tam (HKG)	L 2–5	15	did not advance				
Jose Palavecino	Men's individual épée B	Latreche (FRA)	L 5–4	15	did not advance				

Note: Ranks from qualification pools were given as an overall ranking against all other competitors.

== Wheelchair tennis ==
Athlete	Event	Round of 64	Round of 32	Round of 16	Quarterfinals	Semifinals	Final / BM	
Athlete	Event	Opposition Score	Opposition Score	Opposition Score	Opposition Score	Opposition Score	Opposition Score	Rank
Gustavo Fernandez	Men's singles	Mazzei (ITA); W 6–0, 6–0	Bedard (CAN); W 6–0, 6–0	Sanada (JPN); W 3–6, 6–4, 6–1	Houdet (FRA); L 6–1, 1–6, 6–1	did not advance		
Agustin Ledesma	Men's singles	Rydberg (USA); L 7–6, 3–6, 1–6	did not advance					
Agustin Ledesma; Gustavo Fernandez	Men's doubles	—N/a	Kunieda/Saida (JPN); L 3–6, 1–6	did not advance				

== See also ==
- Argentina at the Paralympics
- Argentina at the 2012 Summer Olympics
