= Mario Ríos =

Mario Ríos may refer to:

- Mario Ríos Padilla (1908–1998), Chilean agricultural entrepreneur and Conservative politician
- Mario Enrique Ríos Montt (born 1932), Guatemalan Roman Catholic prelate, human rights activist
- Mario Ríos Santander (born 1945), Chilean politician, senator and deputy
- Mario Ríos (cyclist), competed in the 2001 and 2002 Panamanian National Road Championships
- Mario Ríos (footballer) (born 1989), Argentine footballer, see Football 5-a-side at the 2024 Summer Paralympics – Men's team squads
