= Swimming at the 2012 Summer Paralympics – Women's 100 metre breaststroke SB11 =

Women's 100m Breaststroke SB11 at the XIV Paralympic Games
- Venue: London Aquatics Centre
- Dates: 3 September
- Competitors: 11 from 10 nations
- Winning time: 1:27.98

Medalists
| 1st place, gold medalist(s) | | Maja Reichard | Sweden |
| 2nd place, silver medalist(s) | | Yana Berezhna | Ukraine |
| 3rd place, bronze medalist(s) | | Nadia Báez | Argentina |

The women's 100m breaststroke SB11 event at the 2012 Summer Paralympics took place at the London Aquatics Centre on 3 September. There were two heats; the swimmers with the eight fastest times advanced to the final.

== Results ==
=== Heats ===
Competed from 10:55.

==== Heat 1 ====
| Rank | Lane | Name | Nationality | Time | Notes |
|---|---|---|---|---|---|
| 1 | 4 | Nadia Báez | Argentina | 1:32.07 | Q, AM |
| 2 | 3 | Stephanie Douard | France | 1:35.57 | Q |
| 3 | 5 | Daniela Schulte | Germany | 1:36.74 | Q |
| 4 | 6 | Letticia Martinez | United States | 1:37.97 | Q |
| 5 | 2 | Irina Lavrova | Russia | 1:40.03 | |

==== Heat 2 ====
| Rank | Lane | Name | Nationality | Time | Notes |
|---|---|---|---|---|---|
| 1 | 4 | Maja Reichard | Sweden | 1:28.51 | Q, WR |
| 2 | 5 | Yana Berezhna | Ukraine | 1:32.78 | Q |
| 3 | 2 | Amber Thomas | Canada | 1:37.52 | Q |
| 4 | 3 | Rina Akiyama | Japan | 1:38.94 | Q |
| 5 | 7 | Olga Sokolova | Russia | 1:40.28 | |
| 6 | 6 | Renette Bloem | South Africa | 1:40.61 | |

=== Final ===
Competed at 18:45.

| Rank | Lane | Name | Nationality | Time | Notes |
|---|---|---|---|---|---|
| 1st place, gold medalist(s) | 4 | Maja Reichard | Sweden | 1:27.98 | WR |
| 2nd place, silver medalist(s) | 3 | Yana Berezhna | Ukraine | 1:29.99 | |
| 3rd place, bronze medalist(s) | 5 | Nadia Báez | Argentina | 1:31.21 | AM |
| 4 | 2 | Daniela Schulte | Germany | 1:36.16 | |
| 5 | 7 | Amber Thomas | Canada | 1:36.21 | |
| 6 | 6 | Stephanie Douard | France | 1:36.50 | |
| 7 | 8 | Rina Akiyama | Japan | 1:36.79 | AS |
| 8 | 1 | Letticia Martinez | United States | 1:41.10 | |

'Q = qualified for final. WR = World Record. AM = Americas Record. AS = Asian Record.
