= Álvaro González =

Álvaro González may refer to:

- Álvaro González (footballer, born 1973), Uruguayan football forward
- Álvaro González (footballer, born 1984), Uruguayan football right winger
- Álvaro González de Galdeano (born 1970), Spanish cyclist
- Álvaro González (Paralympic footballer) (born 1974), Spanish footballer
- Álvaro González (footballer, born 1990), Spanish football defender
- Álvaro González (politician), Argentine lawyer and politician
- Álvaro González (footballer, born 2007), Spanish football goalkeeper
