= Blind football at the 2024 Summer Paralympics =

Blind football: A sport for visually impaired athletes, that uses a noise-making ball

2024 Blind football Paralympic tournament

Tournament details
- Host country: Paris, France
- Dates: 1 – 7 September 2024
- Teams: 8 (from 4 confederations)
- Venue: Eiffel Tower Stadium

Final positions
- Champions: France (1st title)
- Runners-up: Argentina
- Third place: Brazil
- Fourth place: Colombia

Tournament statistics
- Matches played: 18
- Goals scored: 22 (1.22 per match)
- Attendance: 176,610 (9,812 per match)
- Top scorer(s): (Brazil) Nonato (France) Villeroux (3 goals)

Blind football, also known as football 5-a-side, at the 2024 Summer Paralympics was held at the Eiffel Tower Stadium in Paris, France.

== Qualifying ==
There are eight men's teams who compete in the competition. Each team must have a maximum of eight outfield players and two goalkeepers.

Means of qualification	Date	Venue	Berths	Qualified
Host country allocation	—N/a	—N/a	1	France
2022 IBSA Blind Football European Championships	8–18 June 2022	(Italy) Pescara	1	Turkey
2022 IBSA Blind Football African Championships	14–26 September 2022	(Morocco) Bouznika	1	Morocco
2022 IBSA Blind Football Asian-Oceanian Championships	11–18 November 2022	(India) Kochi	1	China
2023 IBSA World Games	18–27 August 2023	(United Kingdom) Birmingham	3	Argentina; Colombia; Japan
2023 Parapan American Games	17–26 November 2023	(Chile) Santiago	1	Brazil
Total			8	

At the IBSA World Games, as China (runner-up) and Brazil (third place) qualified for the Paralympics through their regional qualifiers, their places were allocated to Colombia (fourth place) and Japan (fifth place).

== Schedule ==
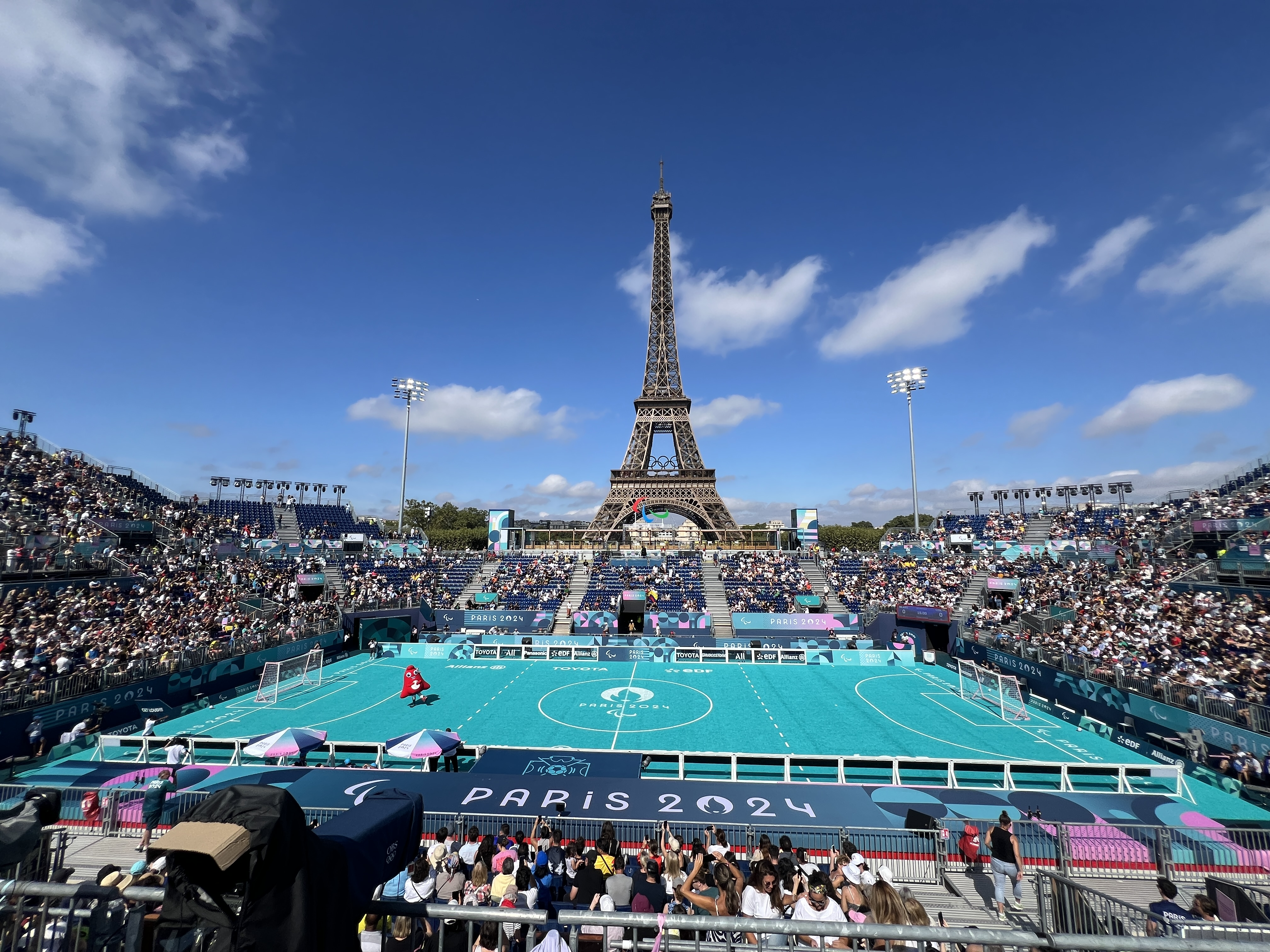
Eiffel Tower stadium during competition.

G	Group stage	C	Classification matches	½	Semi-finals	B	Bronze medal match	F	Final

Date Event	Thu 29 Aug	Fri 30 Aug	Sat 31 Aug	Sun 1 Sep	Mon 2 Sep	Tue 3 Sep	Wed 4 Sep	Thu 5 Sep		Fri 6 Sep	Sat 7 Sep	
Men's tournament				G	G	G		C	½		B	F

== Medalists ==
Event	Gold	Silver	Bronze
Men's team	France; Alessandro Bartolomucci; Mickaël Miguez; Gael Riviere; Hakim Arezki; Martin Baron; Khalifa Youmé; Frédéric Villeroux; Ahmed Tidiane Diakité; Fabrice Morgado; Benoit Chevreau de Montlehu	Argentina; Darío Lencina; Ángel Deldo; Nahuel Heredia; Froilán Padilla; Jesús Merlos; Matias Olivera; Maximiliano Espinillo; Osvaldo Fernández; Mario Ríos; Germán Muleck	Brazil; Luan Gonçalves; Maicon Júnior; Cássio Lopes; Jonatan Borges da Silva; Jeferson da Conceição; Raimundo Nonato; Tiago da Silva; Ricardo Alves; Jardiel Soares; Matheus Bumussa

== Preliminary round ==
=== Group A ===
Pos	Team	Pld	W	D	L	GF	GA	GD	Pts	Qualification
1	Brazil	3	2	1	0	6	0	+6	7	Semi-finals
2	France (H)	3	2	0	1	3	3	0	6	Semi-finals
3	China	3	1	1	1	2	1	+1	4	Fifth place match
4	Turkey	3	0	0	3	0	7	−7	0	Seventh place match

Source: Paris 2024
(H) Hosts
1 September 2024
18:30

Brazil	3–0	Turkey
Nonato 6' (pen.), 21' (pen.); Gonçalves 20'	Report

Eiffel Tower Stadium, Paris
Attendance: 9,160
Referee: Jose Alfredo Martinez Ibarra (Mexico)

1 September 2024
20:30

France	1–0	China
Youmé 19'	Report

Eiffel Tower Stadium, Paris
Attendance: 9,160
Referee: Germinal Dante Lubrano (Argentina)

2 September 2024
18:30

Turkey	0–2	China
	Report	Zhu 20'; Tang 24'

Eiffel Tower Stadium, Paris
Attendance: 8,814
Referee: Rodolphe-Marc-Pierrick Bonnin (France)

2 September 2024
20:30

France	0–3	Brazil
	Report	Alves 14'; Soares 15' (pen.); Nonato 27'

Eiffel Tower Stadium, Paris
Attendance: 10,580
Referee: Tom Jozef de Bruyne (Belgium)

3 September 2024
18:30

China	0–0	Brazil
	Report

Eiffel Tower Stadium, Paris
Attendance: 10,580
Referee: Germinal Dante Lubrano (Argentina)

3 September 2024
20:30

Turkey	0–2	France
	Report	Villeroux 5'; Baron 20'

Eiffel Tower Stadium, Paris
Attendance: 10,580
Referee: Jose Alfredo Martinez Ibarra (Mexico)

=== Group B ===
Pos	Team	Pld	W	D	L	GF	GA	GD	Pts	Qualification
1	Colombia	3	2	1	0	2	0	+2	7	Semi-finals
2	Argentina	3	1	2	0	1	0	+1	5	Semi-finals
3	Morocco	3	1	1	1	1	1	0	4	Fifth place match
4	Japan	3	0	0	3	0	3	−3	0	Seventh place match

Source: Paris 2024
1 September 2024
11:30

Japan	0–1	Colombia
	Report	Pérez 8'

Eiffel Tower Stadium, Paris
Attendance: 8,900
Referee: Tom Jozef de Bruyne (Belgium)

1 September 2024
13:30

Morocco	0–0	Argentina
	Report

Eiffel Tower Stadium, Paris
Attendance: 8,900
Referee: François Carcouët (France)

2 September 2024
11:30

Argentina	0–0	Colombia
	Report

Eiffel Tower Stadium, Paris
Attendance: 8,790
Referee: Jose Alfredo Martinez Ibarra (Mexico)

2 September 2024
13:30

Japan	0–1	Morocco
	Report	Sasaki 26' (o.g.)

Eiffel Tower Stadium, Paris
Attendance: 8,790
Referee: François Carcouët (France)

3 September 2024
11:30

Colombia	1–0	Morocco
Pérez 25'	Report

Eiffel Tower Stadium, Paris
Attendance: 8,890
Referee: François Carcouët (France)

3 September 2024
13:30

Argentina	1–0	Japan
Fernández 10'	Report

Eiffel Tower Stadium, Paris
Attendance: 8,890
Referee: Tom Jozef de Bruyne (Belgium)

== Knockout stage ==
=== Bracket ===
Semi-finals
5 September
Colombia	0
France	1
5 September
Brazil	0 (3)
Argentina (p)	0 (4)

Gold medal match
7 September
France (p)	1 (3)
Argentina	1 (2)
Bronze medal match
7 September
Colombia	0
Brazil	1

=== Seventh place match ===
5 September 2024
10:30

Turkey	2–0	Japan
Şatay 22'; Aslan 29'	Report

Eiffel Tower Stadium, Paris
Attendance: 8,979
Referee: Ellen Dayane Grosskopf (Brazil)

=== Fifth place match ===
5 September 2024
13:00

China	1–0	Morocco
Liu 9'	Report

Eiffel Tower Stadium, Paris
Attendance: 8,979
Referee: Rodolphe-Marc-Pierrick Bonnin (France)

=== Semi-finals ===
5 September 2024
17:30

Colombia	0–1	France
	Report	Villeroux 26'

Eiffel Tower Stadium, Paris
Attendance: 11,630
Referee: Tom Jozef de Bruyne (Belgium)

5 September 2024
20:00

Brazil	0–0	Argentina
	Report
Penalties
Maicon (penalty scored); Lopes (penalty missed); Nonato (penalty scored); da Silva (penalty missed); Soares (penalty scored); Alves (penalty missed)	3–4	(penalty scored) Espinillo; (penalty missed) Ríos; (penalty scored) Heredia; (penalty missed) Padilla; (penalty scored) Olivera; (penalty scored) Fernández

Eiffel Tower Stadium, Paris
Attendance: 11,630
Referee: François Carcouët (France)

=== Bronze medal match ===
7 September 2024
17:30

Colombia	0–1	Brazil
	Report	Jefinho 24'

Eiffel Tower Stadium, Paris
Attendance: 11,679
Referee: François Carcouët (France)

=== Gold medal match ===
7 September 2024
20:00

France	1–1	Argentina
Villeroux 12'	Report	Espinillo 12'
Penalties
Arezki (penalty scored); Baron (penalty scored); Villeroux (penalty scored)	3–2	(penalty scored) Espinillo; (penalty scored) Ríos; (penalty missed) Heredia

Eiffel Tower Stadium, Paris
Attendance: 11,679
Referee: Tom Jozef de Bruyne (Belgium)

== Statistics ==
=== Goalscorers ===
There were 22 goals scored in 18 matches, for an average of 1.22 goals per match.

3 goals

- Nonato (BRA)
- Frédéric Villeroux (FRA)

2 goals

- Juan Pérez (COL)

1 goal

- Maximiliano Espinillo (ARG)
- Osvaldo Fernández (ARG)
- Ricardo Alves (BRA)
- Luan Gonçalves (BRA)
- Jeferson da Conceição (BRA)
- Jardiel Soares (BRA)
- Liu Meng (CHN)
- Tang Zhihua (CHN)
- Zhu Ruiming (CHN)
- Martin Baron (FRA)
- Khalifa Youmé (FRA)
- Emre Aslan (TUR)
- Hasan Şatay (TUR)

1 own goal

- Robertoizumi Sasaki (JPN) (against Morocco)

Source: Paralympics

== Final rankings ==
Rank	Team
1st place, gold medalist(s)	France
2nd place, silver medalist(s)	Argentina
3rd place, bronze medalist(s)	Brazil
4	Colombia
5	China
6	Morocco
7	Turkey
8	Japan

== See also ==
- Football at the 2024 Summer Olympics
