= Quico (footballer) =

Spanish footballer

José Eugenio Ruiz Palacios (born 12 August 1961, in Seville), known as Quico, is a Spanish retired footballer who played as a central defender.

== Football career ==
During his professional career, Quico played mainly for hometown club Real Betis. Arriving in the 1982–83 campaign, he made his La Liga debut on 31 October 1982 in a 0–1 home loss against RC Celta de Vigo, and quickly became a fan favourite although he rarely started (only seven league matches in his first three years combined); on 30 August 1987, he scored the 2–1 winner in the Seville derby at Sevilla FC, heading home in the 86th minute of the match.

Quico left Betis in 1988, with 81 first division appearances in which he netted six goals. He then played two seasons in the second division with Andalusia neighbours Recreativo de Huelva, starting in both years and being relegated in his second.
