= Jonathan Grangier =

Personal information
- Born: 13 November 1987 (age 38) Bordeaux, France

Sport
- Sport: 5-a-side football
Medal record
Representing France
Paralympic Games
Silver medal – second place	2012 London	Men's tournament
IBSA European Championships
Gold medal – first place	2011 Aksaray	Men's tournament

Jonathan Grangier (born 13 November 1987) is a French former 5-a-side footballer who played goalkeeper. He competed at the 2012 Summer Paralympics where he won a silver medal.
