= David Labarre =

Personal information
- Born: 24 May 1988 (age 38) Saint-Gaudens, Haute-Garonne, France

Sport
- Country: France
- Sport: Football 5-a-side
- Disability: Retinitis pigmentosa
- Retired: 2018
Medal record
Football 5-a-side
Representing France
Paralympic Games
Silver medal – second place	2012 London	Men's team

David Labarre (born 24 May 1988) is a French politician, entrepreneur and former football 5-a-side player who played as a midfielder. He is a Paralympic silver medalist and is the founder of the Cécifoot team in Toulouse.

== Sporting career ==
Labarre was inspired to play football when he watched the 1998 World Cup and he idolised Zinedine Zidane since he was ten years old. He began playing the sport when he was fourteen years old and dreamt of becoming a professional footballer, he joined an able-bodied football club and he enjoyed the training very much. Once he found his passion for sport, he experienced a major tragedy when his mother died suddenly. Labarre competed internationally for France when he was seventeen years old and has won four national championships, three IBSA World Cups and a silver medal at the 2012 Summer Paralympics.

Labarre is also known as a "mountain adventurer" as he regularly goes mountain hiking in the Pyrenees, he grew up in Aspet in the Comminges In 2018, he attempted to go up four of the world's tallest mountain summits, he climbed up Aneto, Mount Toubkal, Mont Blanc and Himalayas with a sighted guide.

== Political career ==
As well as football, Labarre was also interested in the French presidential elections, particularly following Jean Lassalle for two days during the 2003 presidential elections who he knew very well as Lassalle lived in a village not far from Labarre.

Labarre decided to run as a member of Parliament in 2017 and is a candidate for Lassalle's political party Résistons!. He proposed to increase employment and improving teleworking services in the Comminges under his constituency.
