= Ryan Estep =

American wheelchair fencer (born 1987)

Personal information
- Nationality: United States
- Born: 1987 (age 38–39) Monroe, Louisiana, U.S.
- Height: 6 ft 0 in (1.83 m)
Medal record
Athletics
U.S. Fencing National Wheelchair Championship
Silver medal – second place	2011 U.S. Fencing National Wheelchair Championship	Men's epee fencing
Gold medal – first place	2012 U.S. Fencing National Wheelchair Championship	Men's foil fencing
Gold medal – first place	2012 U.S. Fencing National Wheelchair Championship	Men's epee fencing
Other
Silver medal – second place	2012 Montreal Wheelchair World Cup	Men's epee fencing

Ryan Estep (born 1987) is an American wheelchair fencer from Monroe, Louisiana who won a silver medal in the U.S. Fencing National Wheelchair Championship and next year won gold at the same place. In 2012 he also got a silver medal for his participation in the Montreal Wheelchair World Cup.
