= Juanma =

Juanma is a Spanish nickname which is short for "Juan Manuel". Notable people include:

- Juanma Bajo Ulloa (born 1967), Spanish film director
- Juanma (footballer, born 1980), full name Juan Manuel Barrero Barrero, former Spanish football goalkeeper
- Juanma (footballer, born 1990), full name Juan Manuel Delgado Lloria, Spanish football forward
- Juanma (footballer, born 1977), full name Juan Manuel Delgado Moreno, former Spanish football defender
- Juanma (footballer, born 1984), full name Juan Manuel Espinosa Valenzuela, Spanish football midfielder
- Juan Manuel Gárate Cepa (born 1976), Spanish cyclist
- Juanma (footballer, born 1993), full name Juan Manuel García García, Spanish football forward
- Juanma (footballer, born 1981), full name Juan Manuel Gómez Sánchez, Spanish football midfielder
- Juanma (footballer, born 1986), full name Juan Manuel Hernández Sánchez, Spanish football midfielder
- Juan Manuel Lillo (born 1965), Spanish football manager
- Juan Manuel López (born 1983), Puerto Rican professional boxer
- Juan Manuel López Iturriaga (born 1959), former Spanish basketball player
- Juan Manuel López (footballer) (born 1969), former Spanish football defender
- Juanma (footballer, born 1982), full name Juan Manuel Marrero Monzón, Spanish football midfielder
- Juanma Ortiz (born 1982), Spanish football midfielder
- Juanma Suárez (1960–1992), Spanish punk rock musician
- Juanma (footballer, born 1978), full name Juan Manuel Valero Martínez, former Spanish football defender
