= Khalifa Youmé =

Senegalese-French football player

Personal information
- Born: 12 November 1982 (age 43) Dakar, Senegal

Sport
- Sport: 5-a-side football
Medal record
Representing France
Paralympic Games
Gold medal – first place	2024 Paris	Men's team

Khalifa Youmé (born 12 November 1982 in Dakar, Senegal) is a Senegalese-born French football 5-a-side player who plays as a forward for FC Girondins de Bordeaux, he is a Paralympic champion at the 2024 Summer Paralympics.

Youmé was inspired to play football by watching his sporting idol Zinedine Zidane at the 1998 FIFA World Cup. He started playing blind football in 2005.
