= Stéphanie Douard =

French Paralympic swimmer

Personal information
- Born: 10 March 1979 (age 47) Bourg-en-Bresse, France
- Height: 1.61 m (5 ft 3 in)
- Weight: 55 kg (121 lb)

Sport
- Country: France
- Sport: Paralympic swimming
- Disability class: S11
Medal record
Paralympic swimming
Representing France
World Championships
Bronze medal – third place	2006 Durban	Women's 100m backstroke S11
Bronze medal – third place	2010 Eindhoven	Women's 100m butterfly S11
European Championships
Bronze medal – third place	2009 Reykjavik	Women's 200m freestyle S11
Bronze medal – third place	2011 Berlin	Women's 100m backstroke S11
Bronze medal – third place	2011 Berlin	Women's 200m freestyle S11

Stéphanie Douard (born 10 March 1979) is a former French Paralympic swimmer who competed in international level events. She has won five bronze medals in the World Para Swimming Championships and World Para Swimming European Championships. She has represented France at the 2012 Summer Paralympics but did not medal in her events. Jordi Reina was his coach.
