= David Clarke (Paralympic footballer) =

English blind footballer (born 1970)

David Clarke OBE
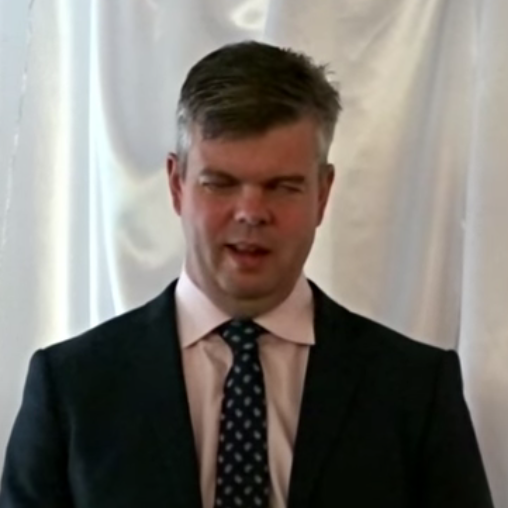
- Clarke talking in 2016

Personal information
- Full name: David Philip Clarke
- Born: 11 September 1970 (age 55) Wigan, England

Sport
- Country: United Kingdom
- Sport: Blind football

David Philip Clarke OBE (born 11 September 1970) is an English former footballer, whose career spanned 17 years from 1995 to 2012, for the England and Great Britain blind football team. He is the Chief Executive of Paralympics GB. He attended New College Worcester, a school for the blind and visually impaired.

== Sports career ==
Clarke made 144 international appearances scoring 128 goals.

He was part of the English which finished fifth in the 5-a-side at the 2008 Summer Paralympics. and he was selected as the Stadium torch bearer for the 2012 Summer Paralympics, where he was the first person to receive the torch in the Stadium, and passed it to the final torch bearer. He was a member of the 2012 Summer Paralympic blind-five-a-side Team GB football team.

The following year he was guest of honour at the 2013 FA Cup Final between Manchester City and Bolton Wanderes and handed the trophy over to his hometown team Wigan Athletic. He was inducted into the English Football Hall of Fame in September 2013. Clarke received a lifetime achievement award at the FA England football awards in February 2013 and received an honorary doctorate from the University of Hertfordshire in November 2013.

Clarke was appointed Officer of the Order of the British Empire (OBE) in the 2023 Birthday Honours for services to Paralympic Sport.
