= Hakim Arezki =

French football 5-a-side player

Personal information
- Born: 20 March 1983 (age 43) Azazga, Algeria

Sport
- Country: France
- Sport: Football 5-a-side
- Club: Précy-Sur-Oise Cécifoot
Medal record
Football 5-a-side
Representing France
Paralympic Games
Silver medal – second place	2012 London	Men's team
Gold medal – first place	2024 Paris	Men's team
European Championships
Gold medal – first place	2009 Nantes	Men's team
Silver medal – second place	2013 Loano	Men's team
Silver medal – second place	2019 Rome	Men's team

Hakim Arezki (kabyle : Ḥakim Aṛezqi), born 20 March 1983, is a French football 5-a-side player who competes in international blind football tournaments, he plays as defender and midfielder. He is a Paralympic Gold medalist and a European champion.

== Disability ==
On 27 April 2001, 18 year old Arezki took part in a peace march in his hometown of Azazga following a number of riots in Kabylia in the past month. The demonstrators marched in front of the gendarmerie and the gendarmerie began shooting at the demonstrators, three people were fatally hit including one of Arezki's childhood friends. Arezki ran with the group of demonstrators and was shot in his Achilles tendon and in his temple, if he hadn't turned his head around then he would've been shot in the forehead. He was taken to the hospital in the town and was overwhelmed by the casualties' serious injuries so he was transported to Mustapha-Pasha hospital in Algiers. The riot caused 129 deaths and thousands were wounded including Arezki.

Two days later, 29 April, Arezki was admitted to a Parisian hospital by air ambulance. He was taken into surgery as soon as he arrived, the surgeons took a lot of considerable time to decide whether to amputate his foot but fortunately they managed to save his foot, his second operation was to remove the three bullet fragments in his head but the surgeons discovered that one of the fragments had severed his optic nerve which caused Arezki to have permanent sight loss.

Months later, Arezki joined in a specialised centre for the blind in France where he taught how to read Braille, learned to play piano and guitar, he was also introduced to blind football which gave him passion to play football and he joined several football clubs since 2009 then joined France's national football 5-a-side team in 2010. He participated at the 2012 Summer Paralympics where he won a silver medal, he participated again at the 2020 Summer Paralympics and finished in eighth place. He then competed at the 2024 Summer Paralympics, where he won a gold medal.
