= Arnaud Ayax =

French association football player

Personal information
- Born: 27 June 1986 (age 40) Longjumeau, France

Sport
- Country: France
- Sport: Football 5-a-side
- Disability: Retinitis pigmentosa
Medal record
Football 5-a-side
Representing France
Paralympic Games
Silver medal – second place	2012 London	Men's team
European Championships
Gold medal – first place	2009 Tantes	Men's team
Gold medal – first place	2011 Aksaray	Men's team

Arnaud Ayax (born 27 June 1986) is a French former football 5-a-side player who competed at international football 5-a-side competitions. He is a Paralympic silver medalist and a two-time European champion. He was born with retinitis pigmentosa and has been blind since birth.
