= José Luis Giera =

Spanish footballer (born 1985)

Personal information
- Full name: José Luis Giera Tejuelo
- Nationality: Spanish
- Born: 28 July 1985 (age 41)

Sport
- Country: Spain
- Sport: 5-a-side football
Medal record
Men's 5-a-side football
Representing Spain
Paralympic Games
Bronze medal – third place	2012 London	Team

José Luis Giera Tejuelo (born 28 July 1985) is a 5-a-side football player from Spain.

== Personal ==
Giera was born on 28 July 1985. He has a disability: he is blind and is a B1 type sportsperson. In 2013, he was awarded the bronze Real Orden al Mérito Deportivo.

== 5-a-side football ==
Giera is affiliated with the DZ Alicante sport federation. He competed in the 2010 World Championships where he represented Spain. In August 2011, he was part of the Spanish team that competed in the Spanish organized International Futsal Friendly Tournament held in Madrid. The team played against Argentina, England, Turkey, and Italy. The Italian hosted European Championships was played in June 2012, and were the last major competition for him and his team prior to the start of the Paralympic Games. He was coached in the competition by Miguel Ángel Becerra, and participated in daily fitness activities to help with preparations for the Championship and Paralympic Games. On 7 June he took a medical test to clear participation in the Paralympic Games.

Giera played 5-a-side football at the 2012 Summer Paralympics. His team finished third after they played Argentina and, won 1-0 following a penalty shootout. Giera took a shot but missed. The bronze medal game was watched by Infanta Elena and President of the Spanish Paralympic Committee. In the team's opening game against Great Britain, the game ended in a 1–1 draw. He was a member of the national team in 2013 and competed in the European Championships. The team faced Russia, Greece and France in the group stage. His team went on to defeat France and finish first in the competition.
