= Silvio Velo =

Argentinian blind footballer (born 1971)

Personal information
- Born: 29 May 1971 (age 55) San Pedro, Buenos Aires, Argentina

Sport
- Sport: 5-a-side football
- Club: Club Atlético River Plate
Medal record
Representing Argentina
Paralympic Games
Silver medal – second place	2004 Athens	Team
Bronze medal – third place	2008 Beijing	Team
Bronze medal – third place	2016 Rio de Janeiro	Team
Parapan American Games
Silver medal – second place	2011 Guadalajara	Team
Silver medal – second place	2015 Toronto	Team
Silver medal – second place	2019 Lima	Team

Silvio Mauricio Velo, nicknamed Blind Maradona, (born 29 May 1971) is an Argentine retired footballer who competed at the four Paralympics Games, he is the former captain of the Argentinian national 5-a-side football team from 1991 to 2016.

== Personal life ==
Velo was born in San Pedro, Buenos Aires Province, he was born blind but was passionate to play football despite his visual impairment. While growing up, he and his brothers would play football with their friends in their own makeshift football pitch in their neighbourhood.

He began playing blind football when he was introducted to sport at a boarding school for the blind, he also practiced athletics and he was a former national visually impaired long jump champion. His sports teacher created the first ever blind Argentine football team in 1991 when Velo was twenty years old.

== Paralympic Games ==
He has competed at the 2004, 2008, 2012 and 2016 Summer Paralympics. He is also a silver medalist in the Parapan American Games winning silver to four-time Paralympic and two-time Parapan American Games champions Brazil.
