= Raúl Díaz Ortín =

Spanish five-a-side football goalkeeper

Personal information
- Nationality: Spanish
- Born: 11 August 1980 (age 46) Murcia, Spain

Sport
- Country: Spain
- Sport: Five-a-side football

Raúl Díaz Ortín (born 11 August 1980) is a Spanish five-a-side football goalkeeper who has represented Spain as a member of the Spain national team, winning a bronze medal at the 2012 Summer Paralympics.

== Personal ==
Díaz was born on 11 August 1980 in Murcia. In October 2012, there was a tribute to regional Paralympic and Olympic competitors at the San Antonio Catholic University of Murcia (UCAM), which Díaz was a guest at.

== Five-a-side football ==
Díaz played for Spain at the 2010 World Championships where his team earned a silver medal after beating China to qualify for the finals before going down to Brazil. Competing at the 2011 European Championships, his team finished second. He was one of three members of the squad from Murcia. Díaz competed at the 2012 Summer Paralympics as a goalkeeper. The Games were his first. His team came away with a bronze medal. The team prepared for London Games at a training camp before the Games based in Hereford.

In June 2013, Díaz was a goalkeeper for the Murcia team at the 2013 Spanish national championships. His team was in the group with Tarragona, and Madrid.

Díaz was part of the Spain national team that won the 2013 European Championships, beating France in the final.
