= Gaël Rivière =

French 5-a-side footballer (born 1989)

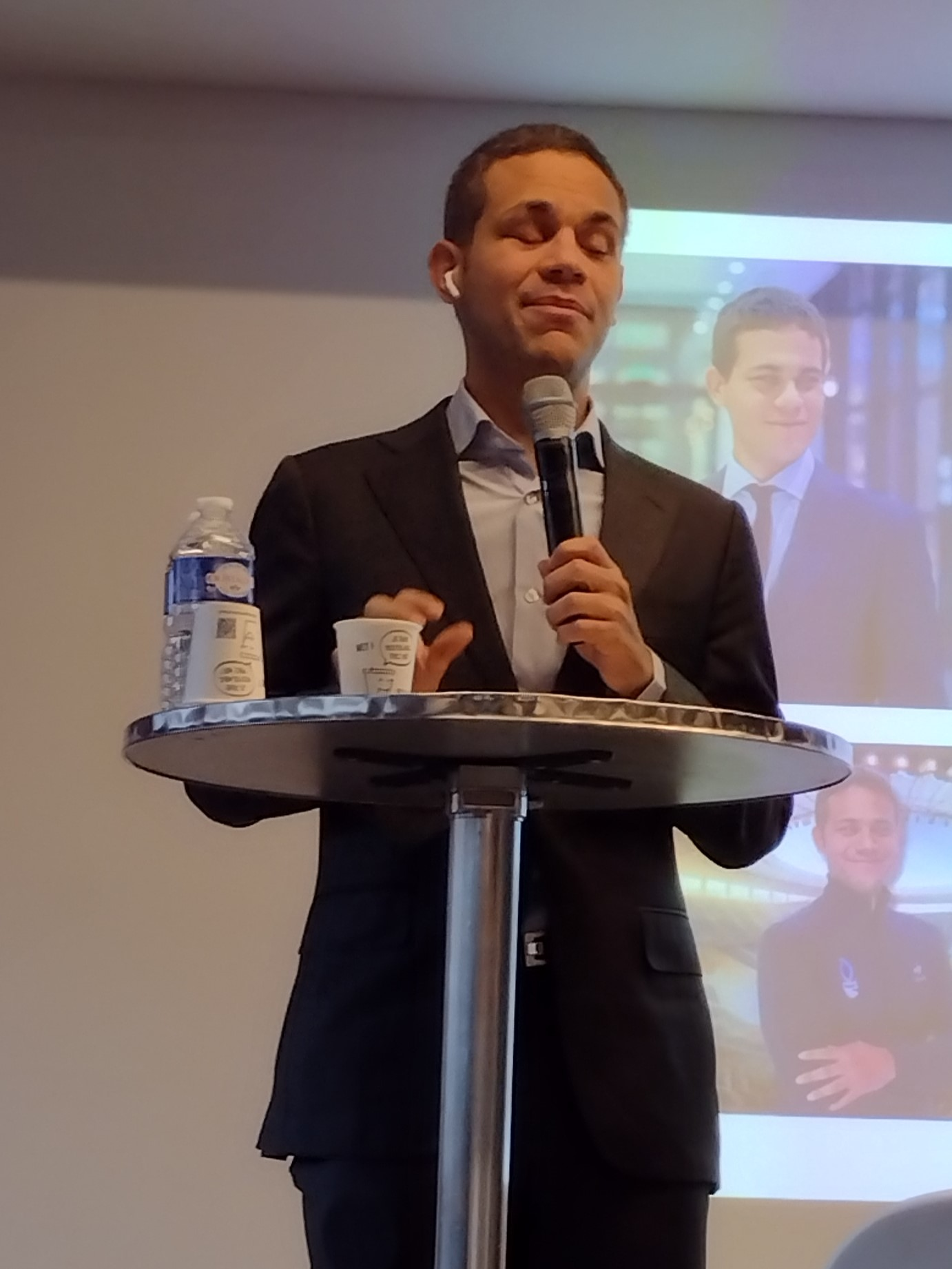

Personal information
- Born: 23 December 1989 (age 36) Saint-Benoit, Reunion

Sport
- Sport: 5-a-side football
Medal record
Representing France
Paralympic Games
Silver medal – second place	2012 London	Men's tournament
Gold medal – first place	2024 Paris	Men's tournament
IBSA European Championships
Gold medal – first place	2009 Nantes	Men's tournament
Gold medal – first place	2022 Pescara	Men's tournament
Silver medal – second place	2019 Rome	Men's tournament
Bronze medal – third place	2008 Malaga	Men's tournament

Gaël Jean Michel Rivière (born 23 December 1989) is a French 5-a-side footballer who plays as a midfielder, he competed at the 2012 and 2020 Summer Paralympics. He is a Paralympic silver medalist and a double European champion.

== Personal life ==
Rivière was born blind on the island of Réunion, he lived there until he was 15 years old then moved to Paris to further his education and become a lawyer at Paris-Panthéon-Assas University. While growing up, he was inspired by Les Bleus at the 1998 FIFA World Cup, he had a football in a plastic bag so that he could hear the ball while he played.
