= Francisco Javier Muñoz Perez =

Spanish paralympic footballer (born 1985)

Francisco Javier Muñoz
Personal information
- Full name: Francisco Javier Muñoz Pérez
- Nickname: Javi
- Nationality: Spanish
- Born: 12 December 1985 (age 40) Barcelona, Spain
Medal record
Men's 5-a-side football
Representing Spain
Paralympic Games
Bronze medal – third place	2012 London	Team

Francisco Javier Muñoz Pérez (born 12 December 1985) is a 5-a-side football player from Spain.

== Personal ==
Muñoz was born 12 December 1985 in Barcelona. He has a disability: he is blind and is a B1 type sportsperson. From the Catalan region of Spain, he was a recipient of a 2012 Plan ADO scholarship. In 2013, he was awarded the bronze Real Orden al Mérito Deportivo.

== 5-a-side football ==
Muñoz is affiliated with the DA Tarragona sport federation.

In August 2011, Muñoz was part of the Spanish team that competed in the Spanish organized International Futsal Friendly Tournament held in Madrid. The team played against Argentina, England, Turkey, and Italy. The Italian hosted European Championships was played in June 2012, and were the last major competition for him and his team prior to the start of the Paralympic Games. He was coached in the competition by Miguel Ángel Becerra, and participated in daily fitness activities to help with preparations for the Championship and Paralympic Games. On 7 June, he took a medical test to clear participation in the Paralympic Games. He played 5-a-side football at the 2012 Summer Paralympics. His team finished third after they played Argentina and, won 1–0. The bronze medal game was watched by Infanta Elena and President of the Spanish Paralympic Committee. In the team's opening game against Great Britain, the game ended in a 1–1 draw. He was a member of the national team in 2013 and competed in the European Championships. The team faced Russia, Greece and France in the group stage. His team won their opener against Russia. His team went on to defeat France and finish first in the competition.
