= Ángel Deldo =

Personal information
- Full name: Ángel Ricardo Deldo Garcia
- Nationality: Argentine
- Born: 1 October 1987 (age 38)

Sport
- Country: Argentina
- Sport: 5-a-side football
Medal record
5-a-side football
Representing Argentina
Paralympic Games
Bronze medal – third place	2016 Rio de Janeiro	Men's team
Parapan American Games
Silver medal – second place	2011 Guadalajara	Men's team
Silver medal – second place	2015 Toronto	Men's team
Silver medal – second place	2019 Lima	Men's team

Ángel Ricardo Deldo Garcia (born 1 October 1987) is an Argentine 5-a-side football player.

== Early life ==
A native of Barranqueras, Chaco, Argentina born prematurely on 1 October 1987. His premature birth caused retinopathy and decrease in his vision gradually, went completely blind at the age of seventeen.

== Career ==
He made his debut appearance at the Paralympics representing Argentina at the 2012 Summer Paralympics. He was part of the Argentina team which lost the bronze medal match against Spain in penalty shootout in the men's 5-a-side competition. He was part of the Argentine team which emerged as runners-up to Brazil at the 2013 Blind Copa América Championships. He was part of the Argentina side which emerged as runners-up to Brazil at the 2014 IBSA World Blind Football Championship which was held in Tokyo, Japan.

He was a member of the national team which clinched gold medal in the 2015 IBSA World Games whereas Argentina defeated United Kingdom 2–1 in the final. He won bronze medal with the Argentine side where Argentina defeated China in penalty shootout to win the bronze medal match during the 2016 Summer Paralympics in the 5-a-side competition.

He was part of the national team which emerged as runners-up to Brazil at the 2018 IBSA World Blind Football Championship. He was also a key member of the Argentine side which won the 2021 Blind Football World Grand Prix. Argentina defeated hosts Japan 2–0 in the final to win the title.
