= Álvaro González (Paralympic footballer) =

Spanish Paralympic football player

Personal information
- Full name: Álvaro González Alcaraz
- Nationality: Spanish
- Born: 29 October 1974 (age 51)

Sport
- Country: Spain
- Sport: 5-a-side football
Medal record
5-a-side football
Representing Spain
Paralympic Games
Bronze medal – third place	2012 London	Men's team

Álvaro González Alcaraz (Note: In this Spanish name, the first or paternal surname is González and the second or maternal family name is Alcaraz.) (born 29 October 1974) is a Spanish football player, who plays in goal for the Spain national 5-a-side football team. He has won a pair bronze medals at the 2004 Summer Paralympics and the 2012 Summer Paralympics.

== Personal ==
González is from Málaga.

== 5-a-side football ==
González is a member of CDC de Málaga, which competes in the Andalusian Cup. As the team's goalkeeper, he has won event.

González won a bronze medal with the team at the 2004 Summer Paralympics. The 2006 World Cup for the Blind was held in Argentina. He competed at the event as the goalkeeper for Spain. The team made it to the bronze medal match. He was one of ten sportspeople from Málaga to compete at the 2008 Summer Paralympics. In July 2008, he participated in a ceremony hosted by the Mayor of Málaga at the townhall honouring all the Olympic and Paralympic competitors from the city. He competed at the 2012 Summer Paralympics. He was in goal in the game against Argentina for the bronze medal. In 2012, a specialized pitch, the first of its kind in Spain, was built in his hometown. In July 2012, he participated in a ceremony hosted by the Mayor of Málaga at the townhall honouring all the Olympic and Paralympic competitors from the city. He was one of 11 sportspeople on the Spanish team from Málaga competing at the London Games. His team won a bronze medal following a penalty shootout in the bronze medal game against Argentina, with González in for the shootout. He was one of seven sportspeople from Málaga to get a 2013 scholarship from Fundación Andalucía Olímpica as part of the Plan Andalucía Olímpica. It was worth €1,200. In February 2013, he received an award at the Gala of Sports Journalists of Andalusia.
