= Martin Baron (footballer) =

French football 5-a-side player

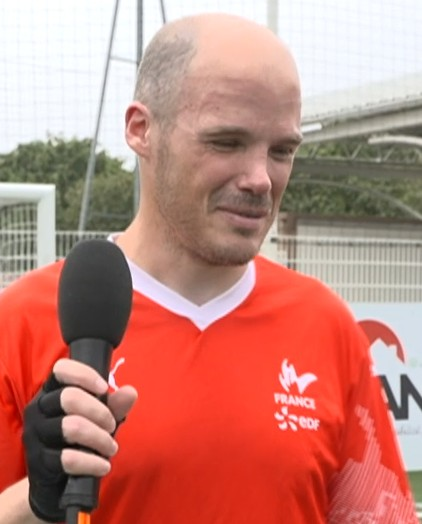
- Martin Baron

Personal information
- Born: 25 July 1987 (age 39) Chambray-lès-Tours, France

Sport
- Country: France
- Sport: Football 5-a-side
- Club: Bondy Cécifoot Club
Medal record
Football 5-a-side
Representing France
Paralympic Games
Silver medal – second place	2012 London	Men's team
Gold medal – first place	2024 Paris	Men's tournament
IBSA World Games
Silver medal – second place	2011 Antalya	Men's team
European Championships
Gold medal – first place	2009 Nantes	Men's team
Gold medal – first place	2011 Aksaray	Men's team
Silver medal – second place	2013 Loano	Men's team
Silver medal – second place	2019 Rome	Men's team
Bronze medal – third place	2007 Malaga	Men's team

Martin Baron (born 25 July 1987) is a French football 5-a-side player who competes at international football competitions. He is a Paralympic silver medalist, IBSA World Games silver medalist and a two-time European champion. He was born blind and plays as striker for Cécifoot since 2005.
