= Riverbank Arena =

Olympic stadium in London, England

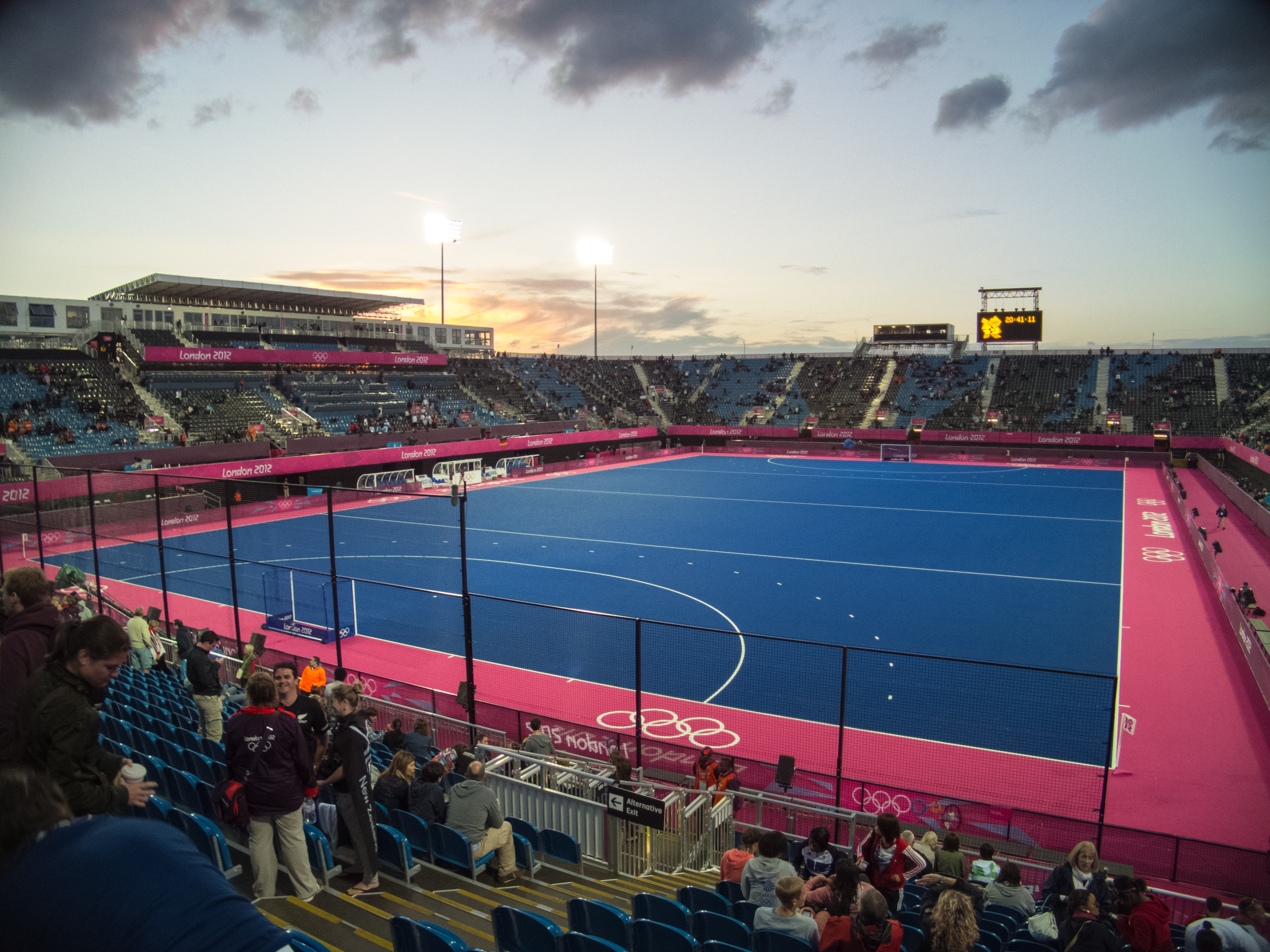
- Riverbank Arena during the 2012 Summer Olympics
- Interactive map of Riverbank Arena
- Location: Queen Elizabeth Olympic Park; Hackney Wick, E9; United Kingdom
- Coordinates: 51°32′58″N 0°1′14″W
- Capacity: 15,000 (5,000 post-Olympics)
- Field size: 100 by 64 metres (328 by 210 feet)

Construction
- Opened: June 2012; 14 years ago

The Riverbank Arena was a stadium in the Olympic Park, in Hackney Wick, London, United Kingdom, containing a water-based astroturf.

== History ==
The Riverbank Arena was built with two venues for field-hockey competition at the 2012 Summer Olympics with capacities of 15,000 and 5,000, respectively, and venues for the football 7-a-side and football 5-a-side competitions at the 2012 Summer Paralympics.

The budget for the stadium was £19 million. Plans were made to scale down the venue after the Olympics, converting it into a 5,000-seat arena and a training pitch in Eton Manor, a sport and leisure venue in Leyton, Waltham Forest. In January 2011, Leyton Orient F.C. expressed an interest in moving into the stadium after the games.

In May 2012, it opened with a test event, a men's and women's invitational hockey tournament.

Riverbank Arena was dismantled following the conclusion of the 2012 Games. The nearby Eton Manor (wheelchair tennis) venue on the Olympic Park was repurposed as the Lee Valley Hockey and Tennis Centre using much of the material from the Riverbank Arena: that facility was re-opened in 2014, hosted the 2015 EuroHockey Nations Championships and is the current ground of East London Hockey Club and Wapping Hockey Club.
