= Frédéric Villeroux =

French blind soccer player

Personal information
- Born: 30 June 1983 (age 42) Montpellier, France

Sport
- Sport: 5-a-side football
- Disability: Stargardt's disease
Medal record
Representing France
Paralympic Games
Gold medal – first place	2024 Paris	Men's team
Silver medal – second place	2012 London	Men's team
IBSA European Championships
Gold medal – first place	2009 Nantes	Men's team
Silver medal – second place	2019 Rome	Men's team

Frédéric "Fred" Villeroux (born 30 June 1983) is a French 5-a-side footballer who plays as striker, he has competed at four Paralympic Games winning two medals.

Despite Villeroux's congenital visual impairment, he is often described as the Messi of blind football as he is known to be the best striker in blind football, he was also one of the scorers in the penalty shootout in the gold medal match at the 2024 Summer Paralympics when the French team won their first Paralympic title by beating Argentina.
