= Football 5-a-side at the 2016 Summer Paralympics – Men's team squads =

The following is a list of squads for each nation competing in football 5-a-side at the 2016 Summer Paralympics in Rio de Janeiro.

== Group A ==
=== Brazil ===
The following is the Brazil squad in the football 5-a-side tournament of the 2016 Summer Paralympics.

No.	Pos.	Player	Class	Date of birth (age)
1	GK	Luan	Sighted	6 January 1993 (aged 23)
3	DF	Cássio	B1	15 May 1989 (aged 27)
5	DF	Damião	B1	28 December 1974 (aged 41)
6	FW	Tiago	B1	28 September 1995 (aged 20)
7	MF	Jefinho	B1	5 October 1989 (aged 26)
8	FW	Nonato	B1	19 August 1987 (aged 29)
9	MF	Marcos Felipe	B1	14 October 1981 (aged 34)
10	MF	Ricardinho	B1	15 December 1988 (aged 27)
11	DF	Maurício Dumbo	B1	25 December 1989 (aged 26)
12	GK	Vinícius	Sighted	1 August 1993 (aged 23)

=== Iran ===
The following is the Iran squad in the football 5-a-side tournament of the 2016 Summer Paralympics.

No.	Pos.	Player	Class	Date of birth (age)
1	GK	Meysam Shojaeiyan	Sighted	22 October 1988 (aged 27)
2	DF	Amir Pourrazavi	B1	26 March 1985 (aged 31)
4	DF	Mohammadreza Mehninasab	B1	21 April 1995 (aged 21)
7	FW	Hossein Rajabpour	B1	5 September 1986 (aged 30)
8	DF	Mohammad Heidari	B1	21 March 1984 (aged 32)
9	FW	Sadegh Rahimighasr	B1	27 May 1995 (aged 21)
10	FW	Behzad Zadaliasghari	B1	5 June 1988 (aged 28)
11	DF	Ahmadreza Shahhosseini	B1	6 March 1990 (aged 26)
12	FW	Rasool Baseri	B1	28 July 1996 (aged 20)
13	GK	Akbar Shoushtari	Sighted	12 August 1984 (aged 32)

=== Morocco ===
The following is the Morocco squad in the football 5-a-side tournament of the 2016 Summer Paralympics.

No.	Pos.	Player	Class	Date of birth (age)
1	GK	Samir Bara	Sighted	30 June 1984 (aged 32)
3	DF	Othmane Driouch	B1	8 January 1994 (aged 22)
4	DF	Imad Berka	B1	30 January 1986 (aged 30)
5	DF	Hassan El Makkaoui	B1	1 January 1981 (aged 35)
6	MF	Ahmed Elazouzi	B1	1 August 1989 (aged 27)
7	DF	Houssam Ghilli	B1	10 September 1993 (aged 22)
8	FW	Zouhair Snisla	B1	25 January 1999 (aged 17)
9	FW	Abderrazak Hattab	B1	12 July 1991 (aged 25)
10	MF	Mhammed Daoudi	B1	6 March 1983 (aged 33)
12	GK	Ayoub Serrakh	Sighted	17 January 1987 (aged 29)

=== Turkey ===
The following is the Turkey squad in the football 5-a-side tournament of the 2016 Summer Paralympics.

No.	Pos.	Player	Class	Date of birth (age)
1	GK	Ali Aktaş	Sighted	11 March 1986 (aged 30)
4	FW	Kahraman Kurbetoğlu	B1	21 April 1984 (aged 32)
5	FW	Recep Aydeniz	B1	20 December 1995 (aged 20)
6	FW	Abullah Sümer	B1	20 January 1993 (aged 23)
7	FW	Emrah Öcal	B1	22 February 1988 (aged 28)
8	DF	Ibrahim Üzüm	B1	1 April 1989 (aged 27)
9	MF	Ercan Bayraktar	B1	30 January 1988 (aged 28)
10	MF	Celal Çoban	B1	24 June 1993 (aged 23)
11	FW	Hasan Şatay	B1	8 October 1994 (aged 21)
12	GK	Aykut Akyon	Sighted	4 April 1993 (aged 23)

== Group B ==
=== Argentina ===
The following is the Argentina squad in the football 5-a-side tournament of the 2016 Summer Paralympics.

No.	Pos.	Player	Class	Date of birth (age)
1	GK	Darío Lencina	Sighted	23 August 1980 (aged 36)
2	DF	Ángel Deldo	B1	1 October 1987 (aged 28)
3	DF	Federico Accardi	B1	26 June 1989 (aged 27)
4	DF	Froilán Padilla	B1	22 February 1979 (aged 37)
5	FW	Silvio Velo	B1	29 May 1971 (aged 45)
8	MF	Lucas Rodríguez	B1	20 September 1981 (aged 34)
10	MF	David Peralta	B1	19 August 1981 (aged 35)
11	FW	Nicolás Véliz	B1	14 February 1991 (aged 25)
12	GK	Germán Muleck	Sighted	4 May 1990 (aged 26)
15	FW	Maximiliano Espinillo	B1	16 November 1993 (aged 22)

=== China ===
The following is the China squad in the football 5-a-side tournament of the 2016 Summer Paralympics.

No.	Pos.	Player	Class	Date of birth (age)
1	GK	Song Zhe	Sighted	7 January 1993 (aged 23)
3	DF	Liu Meng	B1	1 July 1995 (aged 21)
4	MF	Wei Jiansen	B1	11 October 1991 (aged 24)
5	DF	Gao Kai	B1	26 January 1987 (aged 29)
6	FW	Lin Dongdong	B1	12 May 1990 (aged 26)
7	FW	Yu Yutan	B1	1 January 1989 (aged 27)
8	DF	Zhang Lijing	B1	25 August 1994 (aged 22)
9	MF	Wang Zhoubin	B1	14 October 1989 (aged 26)
11	MF	Wang Yafeng	B1	25 March 1990 (aged 26)
12	GK	Xu Huachu	Sighted	4 May 1991 (aged 25)

=== Mexico ===
The following is the Mexico squad in the football 5-a-side tournament of the 2016 Summer Paralympics.

No.	Pos.	Player	Class	Date of birth (age)
1	GK	Javier Amozurrutia	Sighted	17 November 1980 (aged 35)
2	DF	Francisco Rangel	B1	26 October 1991 (aged 24)
4	DF	Pablo Millán	B1	28 June 1991 (aged 25)
5	DF	Marco Guerrero	B1	17 May 1990 (aged 26)
7	FW	Daniel Viera	B1	2 March 1997 (aged 19)
9	FW	Rubicel de la Cruz	B1	23 March 1994 (aged 22)
10	FW	Gustavo Arana	B1	10 September 1993 (aged 22)
11	FW	Jorge Lanzagorta	B1	30 December 1985 (aged 30)
12	GK	Cristian Ortiz	Sighted	20 September 1992 (aged 23)
14	FW	Omar Otero	B1	25 July 1991 (aged 25)

=== Spain ===
The following is the Spain squad in the football 5-a-side tournament of the 2016 Summer Paralympics.

No.	Pos.	Player	Class	Date of birth (age)
1	GK	Pedro Gutiérrez	Sighted	25 January 1986 (aged 30)
3	FW	José Luis Giera Tejuelo	B1	28 July 1985 (aged 31)
4	DF	Iván López	B1	10 November 1992 (aged 23)
5	DF	Carmelo Garrido Alarcón	B1	12 September 1971 (aged 44)
6	DF	Adolfo Samuel Acosta Rodríguez	B1	19 May 1981 (aged 35)
8	DF	Francisco Javier Muñoz Perez	B1	12 December 1985 (aged 30)
9	FW	Sergio Alamar	B1	20 October 2000 (aged 15)
10	FW	Youssef El Haddaqui Rabil	B1	28 December 1988 (aged 27)
11	FW	Marcelo Rosado Carrasco	B1	2 October 1978 (aged 37)
12	GK	Sergio Rodríguez	Sighted	11 July 1987 (aged 29)

== See also ==
- Football 7-a-side at the 2016 Summer Paralympics – Team squads
