= Football 5-a-side at the 2020 Summer Paralympics – Men's team squads =

The following is a list of squads for each nation competing in football 5-a-side at the 2020 Summer Paralympics in Tokyo.

== Group A ==
=== Brazil ===
The following is the Brazil squad in the football 5-a-side tournament of the 2020 Summer Paralympics.

No.	Pos.	Player	Class	Date of birth (age)
1	GK	Luan	Sighted	6 January 1993 (aged 28)
4	DF	Damião	B1	28 December 1974 (aged 46)
5	DF	Cássio	B1	15 May 1989 (aged 32)
6	MF	Jardiel	B1	26 July 1996 (aged 25)
7	MF	Jefinho	B1	5 October 1989 (aged 31)
8	FW	Nonato	B1	19 August 1987 (aged 34)
9	FW	Tiago	B1	28 September 1995 (aged 25)
10	MF	Ricardinho	B1	15 December 1988 (aged 32)
11	FW	Gledson da Paixão Barros	B1	10 September 1990 (aged 30)
12	GK	Matheus Bumussa	Sighted	3 October 1994 (aged 26)

=== China ===
The following is the China squad in the football 5-a-side tournament of the 2020 Summer Paralympics.

No.	Pos.	Player	Class	Date of birth (age)
1	GK	Wang Zhen	Sighted	26 July 1992 (aged 28)
3	DF	Liu Meng	B1	1 July 1995 (aged 25)
5	FW	Liang Zhongzhi	B1	8 November 1994 (aged 25)
6	MF	Zhang Jiabin	B1	10 May 1994 (aged 26)
7	FW	Yu Yutan	B1	1 January 1989 (aged 31)
10	DF	Tang Zhihua	B1	14 April 1993 (aged 27)
11	FW	Zhu Ruiming	B1	4 April 2000 (aged 20)
12	GK	Wu Limin	Sighted	7 February 1990 (aged 30)

=== France ===
The following is the France squad in the football 5-a-side tournament of the 2020 Summer Paralympics.

No.	Pos.	Player	Class	Date of birth (age)
1	GK	Jérémy Sauffisseau	Sighted	10 September 1985 (aged 34)
3	MF	Mickaël Miguez	B1	12 January 1994 (aged 26)
4	FW	Gaël Rivière	B1	23 December 1989 (aged 30)
5	DF	Hakim Arezki	B1	20 March 1983 (aged 37)
7	MF	Babacar Niang	B1	16 November 1991 (aged 28)
8	DF	Yvan Wouandji	B1	28 April 1993 (aged 27)
9	FW	Tidiane Diakite	B1	31 December 1982 (aged 37)
10	MF	Frédéric Villeroux	B1	30 June 1983 (aged 37)
11		Khalifa Youme	B1	12 November 1982 (aged 37)
16	GK	Alessandro Bartolomucci	Sighted	4 August 1997 (aged 23)

=== Japan ===
The following is the Japan squad in the football 5-a-side tournament of the 2020 Summer Paralympics.

No.	Pos.	Player	Class	Date of birth (age)
1	GK	Daisuke Satō	Sighted	17 June 1984 (aged 37)
2	DF	Hajime Teranishi	B1	23 May 1990 (aged 31)
3	MF	Robertoizumi Sasaki	B1	2 May 1978 (aged 43)
7	DF	Akihito Tanaka	B1	8 May 1978 (aged 43)
8	FW	Yasuhiro Sasaki	B1	20 November 1975 (aged 45)
9	FW	Satoru Hinata	B1	13 December 1984 (aged 36)
10	MF	Ryo Kawamura	B1	13 February 1989 (aged 32)
11	FW	Tomonari Kuroda	B1	9 October 1978 (aged 42)
13	GK	Masashi Kamiyama	Sighted	21 February 1994 (aged 27)
14	FW	Yuzuki Sonobe	B1	1 September 2003 (aged 17)

== Group B ==
=== Argentina ===
The following is the Argentina squad in the football 5-a-side tournament of the 2020 Summer Paralympics.

No.	Pos.	Player	Class	Date of birth (age)
1	GK	Darío Lencina	Sighted	23 August 1980 (aged 41)
2	DF	Ángel Deldo	B1	1 October 1987 (aged 33)
3	DF	Federico Accardi	B1	26 June 1989 (aged 32)
4	DF	Froilán Padilla	B1	22 February 1979 (aged 42)
8	DF	Marcelo Panizza	B1	7 October 1983 (aged 37)
10		Braian Pereyra	B1	6 July 1993 (aged 28)
11	FW	Nicolás Véliz	B1	14 February 1991 (aged 30)
12	GK	Germán Muleck	Sighted	4 May 1990 (aged 31)
14	DF	Nahuel Heredia	B1	27 May 1995 (aged 26)
15	FW	Maximiliano Espinillo	B1	16 November 1993 (aged 27)

=== Morocco ===
The following is the Morocco squad in the football 5-a-side tournament of the 2020 Summer Paralympics.

No.	Pos.	Player	Class	Date of birth (age)
1	GK	Samir Bara	Sighted	30 June 1984 (aged 37)
3	DF	Houssam Ghilli	B1	10 September 1993 (aged 27)
4	DF	Kamal Boughlam	B1	5 December 1999 (aged 21)
5	DF	Imad Berka	B1	30 January 1986 (aged 35)
6		Said El-Mselek	B1	15 October 1999 (aged 21)
7		Ayoub Hadimi	B1	1 January 1999 (aged 22)
8		Elhabib Ait Bajja	B1	6 March 1983 (aged 38)
9	FW	Zouhair Snisla	B1	25 January 1999 (aged 22)
10	FW	Abderrazak Hattab	B1	12 July 1991 (aged 30)
12	GK	Abdellali Ait Al-Hakem	Sighted	15 November 1993 (aged 27)

=== Spain ===
The following is the Spain squad in the football 5-a-side tournament of the 2020 Summer Paralympics.

No.	Pos.	Player	Class	Date of birth (age)
1	GK	Pedro Gutiérrez	Sighted	25 January 1986 (aged 35)
4	DF	Iván López	B1	10 November 1992 (aged 28)
5	DF	Pablo Cantero López	B1	1 April 1994 (aged 27)
6	DF	Adolfo Acosta	B1	19 May 1981 (aged 40)
7	FW	Sergio Alamar	B1	20 October 2000 (aged 20)
9	FW	Antonio Jesús Martín	B1	20 April 1982 (aged 39)
10	FW	Youssef El Haddaqui	B1	28 December 1988 (aged 32)
11	FW	Miguel Sánchez López	B1	4 April 2000 (aged 21)
12	GK	Sergio Rodríguez	Sighted	11 July 1987 (aged 34)
21	FW	Vicente Aguilar Carmona	B1	10 April 1970 (aged 51)

=== Thailand ===
The following is the Thailand squad in the football 5-a-side tournament of the 2020 Summer Paralympics.

No.	Pos.	Player	Class	Date of birth (age)
1	GK	Ponchai Kasikonudompaisan	Sighted	29 February 1992 (aged 29)
2	GK	Worasan Phansawad	Sighted	24 May 1971 (aged 50)
4	DF	Bancha Munphet	B1	29 August 1999 (aged 21)
7		Panyawut Kupan	B1	9 May 1994 (aged 27)
8		Kittithat Wimolwan	B1	15 August 1997 (aged 24)
9	FW	Kittikorn Baodee	B1	26 September 1992 (aged 28)
10		Prakrong Buayai	B1	31 December 1988 (aged 32)
11		Suriya Yingchuros	B1	15 November 1987 (aged 33)
13		Terdkiat Boontiang	B1	30 October 1989 (aged 31)
15		Sanan Phetkrachangsuk	B1	14 October 1996 (aged 24)
