= Argentina at the Paralympics =

- IPC code: ARG
- NPC: Argentine Paralympic Committee
- Website: www.coparg.org.ar
- Medals Ranked 40th: Gold 33 Silver 69 Bronze 76 Total 178

Summer appearances
- 1960; 1964; 1968; 1972; 1976; 1980; 1984; 1988; 1992; 1996; 2000; 2004; 2008; 2012; 2016; 2020; 2024

Winter appearances
- 2010; 2014; 2018; 2022

Argentina participated in the inaugural Paralympic Games in 1960 in Rome, with a delegation consisting in five swimmers, and has taken part in every edition of the Summer Paralympics since then. The country made its Winter Paralympics début in 2010, with a two-man delegation in alpine skiing.

Argentines have won a total of 146 medals at the Paralympic Games, of which 30 gold, 59 silver and 57 bronze. All of these medals were won at the Summer Games. This places Argentina 30th on the all-time Paralympic Games medal table.

Argentines won two gold medals in swimming in 1960. In 1964, four of their six gold medals also came through swimming, the other two being obtained in athletics (women's shot put) and weightlifting. In 1968, Argentines won ten gold medals, of which nine in athletics and only one in swimming (H. Aresca in the men's 25m freestyle). These nine athletics medals were all won in javelin, shot put, club throw or discus events, and eight of them were won by women.

In 1972, the Argentine delegation was much less successful, with just one gold medal in athletics (in the men's javelin), and one in women's wheelchair basketball. In 1976, Cristina Benedetti won Argentina's only athletics gold, in the slalom, while Gustavo Galindez took two gold medals in swimming. The only time that Argentina did not win medals was in 1984. In 1992, the country's only Paralympic champion was Horacio Bascioni, in the men's javelin. In 1996, Nestor Suarez won the men's 100m sprint in the T46 category, while swimmer Betiana Basualdo won the women's 100m freestyle in the S2 category, thus providing their country with two gold medals.

== Medals ==
=== Medals by Summer Games ===
Games	Athletes	Gold	Silver	Bronze	Total	Rank
(Italy) Rome 1960	5	2	3	1	6	10
(Japan) Tokyo 1964	24	6	15	16	37	8
(Israel) Tel Aviv 1968	21	10	10	10	30	9
(West Germany) Heidelberg 1972	21	2	4	3	9	20
(Canada) Toronto 1976	20	3	4	7	14	23
(Netherlands) Arnhem 1980	11	4	5	6	15	24
(United States) New York 1984/ (United Kingdom) Stoke Mandeville 1984	6	0	0	0	0	44
(South Korea) Seoul 1988	35	0	7	2	9	39
(Spain) Barcelona 1992	27	1	1	0	2	44
(United States) Atlanta 1996	56	2	5	2	9	38
(Australia) Sydney 2000	43	0	2	3	5	54
(Greece) Athens 2004	55	0	2	2	4	64
(China) Beijing 2008	42	0	1	5	6	58
(United Kingdom) London 2012	63	0	1	4	5	62
(Brazil) Rio de Janeiro 2016	82	1	1	3	5	54
(Japan) Tokyo 2020	55	0	5	4	9	63
(France) Paris 2024	72	2	3	8	13	37
Total		33	69	76	178	40

=== Medals by Winter Games ===
Games	Athletes	Gold	Silver	Bronze	Total	Rank
(Sweden) Örnsköldsvik 1976	did not participate					
(Norway) Geilo 1980	did not participate					
(Austria) Innsbruck 1984	did not participate					
(Austria) Innsbruck 1988	did not participate					
(France) Albertville 1992	did not participate					
(Norway) Lillehammer 1994	did not participate					
(Japan) Nagano 1998	did not participate					
(United States) Salt Lake City 2002	did not participate					
(Italy) Turin 2006	did not participate					
(Canada) Vancouver 2010	2	0	0	0	0	−
(Russia) Sochi 2014	3	0	0	0	0	−
(South Korea) Pyeongchang 2018	2	0	0	0	0	−
(China) Beijing 2022	2	0	0	0	0	−
Total		0	0	0	0	−

=== Medals by Summer Sport ===
Summer Paralympics
Sport	Gold	Silver	Bronze	Total
Athletics	15	31	28	74
Swimming	14	24	24	62
Wheelchair basketball	1	2	2	5
Weightlifting	1	0	1	2
Judo	0	2	3	5
Table tennis	0	2	1	3
Football 5-a-side	0	1	2	3
Cycling	0	0	2	2
Totals (8 entries)	31	62	63	156

=== Medals by Winter Sport ===
Games	Gold	Silver	Bronze	Total
Total	0	0	0	0

== Medalists ==
Medal	Name	Games	Sport	Event
Gold	Juan Sznitowski	(Italy) 1960 Rome	Swimming	Men's 50m backstroke complete class 5
Gold	Beatriz Perazzo	(Italy) 1960 Rome	Swimming	Women's 50m crawl incomplete class 3
Silver	Juan Sznitowski	(Italy) 1960 Rome	Swimming	Men's 50m crawl complete class 5
Silver	Amelia Mier	(Italy) 1960 Rome	Swimming	Women's 50m crawl complete class 5
Bronze	Beatriz Galán	(Italy) 1960 Rome	Swimming	Women's 50m crawl incomplete class 4
Gold	Susana Olarte	(Japan) 1964 Tokyo	Athletics	Women's shot put B
Gold	Juan Sznitowski	(Japan) 1964 Tokyo	Swimming	Men's 50m freestyle prone incomplete class 4
Gold	Silvia Cochetti	(Japan) 1964 Tokyo	Swimming	Women's 50m freestyle prone special class
Gold	Silvia Cochetti	(Japan) 1964 Tokyo	Swimming	Women's 50m freestyle supine special class
Gold	Silvia Cochetti	(Japan) 1964 Tokyo	Swimming	Women's 50m breaststroke special class
Gold	Fernando Bustelli	(Japan) 1964 Tokyo	Weightlifting	Men's lightweight
Silver	Men's relay team	(Japan) 1964 Tokyo	Athletics	Men's wheelchair relay below T10
Silver	Jorge Diz	(Japan) 1964 Tokyo	Athletics	Men's club throw D
Silver	Jorge Diz	(Japan) 1964 Tokyo	Athletics	Men's javelin throw D
Silver	Susana Olarte	(Japan) 1964 Tokyo	Athletics	Women's club throw B
Silver	Silvia Cochetti	(Japan) 1964 Tokyo	Athletics	Women's discus throw D
Silver	Susana Olarte	(Japan) 1964 Tokyo	Athletics	Women's javelin throw B
Silver	Helvio Aresca	(Japan) 1964 Tokyo	Swimming	Men's 25m freestyle prone incomplete class 2
Silver	Jorge Diz	(Japan) 1964 Tokyo	Swimming	Men's 50m freestyle prone incomplete class 4
Silver	Ignesias	(Japan) 1964 Tokyo	Swimming	Men's 50m breaststroke complete class 5
Silver	Estela Falocco	(Japan) 1964 Tokyo	Swimming	Women's 50m freestyle prone special class
Silver	Estela Falocco	(Japan) 1964 Tokyo	Swimming	Women's 50m freestyle supine special class
Silver	Estela Falocco	(Japan) 1964 Tokyo	Swimming	Women's 50m breaststroke special class
Silver	Honorio Romero	(Japan) 1964 Tokyo	Table tennis	Men's singles B
Silver	Helvio Aresca; Honorio Romero	(Japan) 1964 Tokyo	Table tennis	Men's doubles B
Bronze	Alberto Ocampo	(Japan) 1964 Tokyo	Athletics	Men's discus throw D
Bronze	Jorge Diz	(Japan) 1964 Tokyo	Athletics	Men's shot put D
Bronze	Juan Sznitowski	(Japan) 1964 Tokyo	Athletics	Men's pentathlon 2
Bronze	Jorge Diz	(Japan) 1964 Tokyo	Athletics	Men's pentathlon special class
Bronze	Noemi Tortul	(Japan) 1964 Tokyo	Athletics	Women's club throw C
Bronze	Silvia Cochetti	(Japan) 1964 Tokyo	Athletics	Women's club throw D
Bronze	Susana Olarte	(Japan) 1964 Tokyo	Athletics	Women's discus throw B
Bronze	Noemi Tortul	(Japan) 1964 Tokyo	Athletics	Women's javelin throw C
Bronze	Noemi Tortul	(Japan) 1964 Tokyo	Athletics	Women's shot put C
Bronze	Helvio Aresca	(Japan) 1964 Tokyo	Swimming	Men's 25m freestyle supine incomplete class 2
Bronze	Dante Tosi	(Japan) 1964 Tokyo	Swimming	Men's 50m freestyle supine incomplete class 3
Bronze	Juan Sznitowski	(Japan) 1964 Tokyo	Swimming	Men's 50m freestyle supine incomplete class 4
Bronze	Amelia Mier	(Japan) 1964 Tokyo	Swimming	Women's 50m freestyle prone special class
Bronze	Amelia Mier	(Japan) 1964 Tokyo	Swimming	Women's 50m freestyle supine special class
Bronze	Amelia Mier	(Japan) 1964 Tokyo	Swimming	Women's 50m breaststroke special class
Bronze	Hector Brandoni	(Japan) 1964 Tokyo	Weightlifting	Men's featherweight
Gold	Miguel Ángel González	(Israel) 1968 Tel Aviv	Athletics	Men's javelin throw special class
Gold	Dina Galindez	(Israel) 1968 Tel Aviv	Athletics	Women's club throw A
Gold	Susana Olarte	(Israel) 1968 Tel Aviv	Athletics	Women's club throw C
Gold	Dina Galindez	(Israel) 1968 Tel Aviv	Athletics	Women's discus throw A
Gold	Susana Olarte	(Israel) 1968 Tel Aviv	Athletics	Women's discus throw C
Gold	Silvia Cochetti	(Israel) 1968 Tel Aviv	Athletics	Women's discus throw special class
Gold	Susana Olarte	(Israel) 1968 Tel Aviv	Athletics	Women's shot put C
Gold	Silvia Cochetti	(Israel) 1968 Tel Aviv	Athletics	Women's shot put special class
Gold	Susana Masciotra	(Israel) 1968 Tel Aviv	Athletics	Women's slalom cervical class
Gold	Helvio Aresca	(Israel) 1968 Tel Aviv	Swimming	Men's 25m freestyle class 2 complete
Silver	Jorge Diz	(Israel) 1968 Tel Aviv	Athletics	Men's club throw special class
Silver	Miguel Ángel González	(Israel) 1968 Tel Aviv	Athletics	Men's shot put special class
Silver	Dina Galindez	(Israel) 1968 Tel Aviv	Athletics	Women's novices 60m wheelchair dash A
Silver	Noemi Tortul	(Israel) 1968 Tel Aviv	Athletics	Women's club throw B
Silver	Silvia Cochetti	(Israel) 1968 Tel Aviv	Athletics	Women's club throw special class
Silver	Noemi Tortul	(Israel) 1968 Tel Aviv	Athletics	Women's discus throw B
Silver	Dina Galindez	(Israel) 1968 Tel Aviv	Athletics	Women's shot put A
Silver	Silvia Cochetti	(Israel) 1968 Tel Aviv	Athletics	Women's pentathlon special class
Silver	Carlos Carranza	(Israel) 1968 Tel Aviv	Swimming	Men's 50m freestyle class (cauda equina)
Silver	Silvia Cochetti; Estela Fernandez; Dina Galindez; Susana Masciotra; Amelia Mier; Susana Olarte; Noemi Tortul	(Israel) 1968 Tel Aviv	Wheelchair basketball	Women's tournament
Bronze	Carlos Carranza; Jorge Diz; Hugo Loto; Bautista Rubio	(Israel) 1968 Tel Aviv	Athletics	Men's 4x40m relay open
Bronze	Miguel Ángel González	(Israel) 1968 Tel Aviv	Athletics	Men's discus throw special class
Bronze	Jorge Diz	(Israel) 1968 Tel Aviv	Athletics	Men's shot put special class
Bronze	Jorge Diz	(Israel) 1968 Tel Aviv	Athletics	Men's pentathlon special class
Bronze	Silvia Cochetti; Amelia Mier; Susana Olarte; Noemi Tortul	(Israel) 1968 Tel Aviv	Athletics	Women's 4x40m relay open
Bronze	Dina Galindez	(Israel) 1968 Tel Aviv	Athletics	Women's javelin throw A
Bronze	Noemi Tortul	(Israel) 1968 Tel Aviv	Athletics	Women's javelin throw B
Bronze	Silvia Cochetti	(Israel) 1968 Tel Aviv	Athletics	Women's javelin throw special class
Bronze	Carlos Carranza	(Israel) 1968 Tel Aviv	Swimming	Men's 50m breaststroke class 5 (cauda equina)
Bronze	Silvia Cochetti	(Israel) 1968 Tel Aviv	Swimming	Women's 50m freestyle special class
Gold	Rubén Ferrari	(West Germany) 1972 Heidelberg	Athletics	Men's javelin throw 5
Gold	Women's team	(West Germany) 1972 Heidelberg	Wheelchair basketball	Women's tournament
Silver	Raúl Di Paolo	(West Germany) 1972 Heidelberg	Athletics	Men's javelin throw 1B
Silver	Olga Ricchetti	(West Germany) 1972 Heidelberg	Athletics	Women's discus throw 1A
Silver	Olga Ricchetti	(West Germany) 1972 Heidelberg	Athletics	Women's slalom 1A
Silver	Cristina Benedetti	(West Germany) 1972 Heidelberg	Athletics	Women's slalom 2
Bronze	Olga Ricchetti	(West Germany) 1972 Heidelberg	Athletics	Women's javelin throw 1A
Bronze	Olga Ricchetti	(West Germany) 1972 Heidelberg	Swimming	Women's 25m breaststroke 1A
Bronze	Men's team	(West Germany) 1972 Heidelberg	Wheelchair basketball	Men's tournament
Gold	Cristina Benedetti	(Canada) 1976 Toronto	Athletics	Women's slalom 2
Gold	Gustavo Galindez	(Canada) 1976 Toronto	Swimming	Men's 25m butterfly 3
Gold	Gustavo Galindez	(Canada) 1976 Toronto	Swimming	Men's 75m individual medley 3
Silver	Parra Gonzalez	(Canada) 1976 Toronto	Athletics	Women's shot put 1A
Silver	Gustavo Galindez	(Canada) 1976 Toronto	Swimming	Men's 50m freestyle 3
Silver	Gustavo Galindez	(Canada) 1976 Toronto	Swimming	Men's 50m backstroke 3
Silver	Raul Langhi	(Canada) 1976 Toronto	Swimming	Men's 25m breaststroke 1A
Bronze	Luis Grieb	(Canada) 1976 Toronto	Athletics	Men's discus throw 4
Bronze	Honorio Romero	(Canada) 1976 Toronto	Athletics	Men's precision javelin throw 1C-5
Bronze	Gustavo Galindez	(Canada) 1976 Toronto	Swimming	Men's 50m breaststroke 3
Bronze	Luis Perez	(Canada) 1976 Toronto	Swimming	Men's 25m butterfly 3
Bronze	Marcella Rizzotto	(Canada) 1976 Toronto	Swimming	Women's 25m butterfly 3
Bronze	Marcella Rizzotto	(Canada) 1976 Toronto	Swimming	Women's 75m individual medley 3
Bronze	Women's team	(Canada) 1976 Toronto	Wheelchair basketball	Women's tournament
Gold	Eugenia Garcia	(Netherlands) 1980 Arnhem	Swimming	Women's 25m breaststroke 1A
Gold	Monica Lopez	(Netherlands) 1980 Arnhem	Swimming	Women's 25m breaststroke 1B
Gold	Marcella Rizzotto	(Netherlands) 1980 Arnhem	Swimming	Women's 50m breaststroke 3
Gold	Marcella Rizzotto	(Netherlands) 1980 Arnhem	Swimming	Women's 50m freestyle 3
Silver	Luis Grieb	(Netherlands) 1980 Arnhem	Athletics	Men's discus throw 4
Silver	Monica Lopez	(Netherlands) 1980 Arnhem	Swimming	Women's 25m backstroke 1B
Silver	Marcella Rizzotto	(Netherlands) 1980 Arnhem	Swimming	Women's 25m butterfly 3
Silver	Monica Lopez	(Netherlands) 1980 Arnhem	Swimming	Women's 25m freestyle 1B
Silver	Eugenia Garcia; Monica Lopez; Susana Masciotra	(Netherlands) 1980 Arnhem	Swimming	Women's 3x25m freestyle 1A-1C
Bronze	Eugenia Garcia	(Netherlands) 1980 Arnhem	Athletics	Women's club throw 1A
Bronze	Eugenia Garcia	(Netherlands) 1980 Arnhem	Athletics	Women's discus throw 1A
Bronze	Eugenia Garcia	(Netherlands) 1980 Arnhem	Swimming	Women's 25m backstroke 1A
Bronze	Eugenia Garcia	(Netherlands) 1980 Arnhem	Swimming	Women's 25m freestyle 1A
Bronze	Marcella Rizzotto	(Netherlands) 1980 Arnhem	Swimming	Women's 50m backstroke 3
Silver	Jose Daniel Haylan	(South Korea) 1988 Seoul	Athletics	Men's club throw 1A
Silver	Jose Daniel Haylan	(South Korea) 1988 Seoul	Athletics	Men's discus throw 1A
Silver	Jose Daniel Haylan	(South Korea) 1988 Seoul	Athletics	Men's shot put 1A
Silver	Carlos Maslup	(South Korea) 1988 Seoul	Athletics	Men's slalom 1A
Silver	Carlos Maslup	(South Korea) 1988 Seoul	Swimming	Men's 25m breaststroke 1A
Silver	Carlos Maslup	(South Korea) 1988 Seoul	Swimming	Men's 75m individual medley 1A
Bronze	Carlos Maslup	(South Korea) 1988 Seoul	Athletics	Men's discus throw 1A
Bronze	Beatriz Greco	(South Korea) 1988 Seoul	Swimming	Women's 200m individual medley 6
Gold	Horacio Bascioni	(Spain) 1992 Barcelona	Athletics	Men's javelin throw THW2
Silver	Horacio Bascioni	(Spain) 1992 Barcelona	Athletics	Men's shot put THW2
Gold	Suarez Nestor	(United States) 1996 Atlanta	Athletics	Men's 100m T34
Gold	Betiana Basualdo	(United States) 1996 Atlanta	Swimming	Women's 100m freestyle S2
Silver	Horacio Bascioni	(United States) 1996 Atlanta	Athletics	Men's discus throw F51
Silver	Maria Angelica Rodriguez	(United States) 1996 Atlanta	Athletics	Women's discus throw F34-35
Silver	Fabian Ramirez	(United States) 1996 Atlanta	Judo	Men's -78 kg
Silver	Betiana Basualdo	(United States) 1996 Atlanta	Swimming	Women's 50m freestyle S2
Silver	Alejandra Perezlindo	(United States) 1996 Atlanta	Swimming	Women's 100m freestyle S2
Bronze	Betiana Basualdo	(United States) 1996 Atlanta	Swimming	Women's 50m backstroke S2
Bronze	Jose Daniel Haylan	(United States) 1996 Atlanta	Table tennis	Men's singles 1
Silver	Jorge Godoy	(Australia) 2000 Sydney	Athletics	Men's discus throw F11
Silver	Horacio Bascioni	(Australia) 2000 Sydney	Athletics	Men's discus throw F52
Bronze	Elisabel Delgado	(Australia) 2000 Sydney	Athletics	Women's 100m T20
Bronze	Claudia Rut Vignatti	(Australia) 2000 Sydney	Athletics	Women's javelin throw F37
Bronze	Guillermo Marro	(Australia) 2000 Sydney	Swimming	Men's 100m backstroke S7
Silver	Gonsalo Abbas Hachache; Diego Cerega; Eduardo Diaz; Carlos Ivan Figueroa; Dario Lencina; Antonio Mendoza; Oscar Moreno; Julio Ramirez; Lucas Rodríguez; Silvio Velo	(Greece) 2004 Athens	Football 5-a-side	Men's team
Silver	Guillermo Marro	(Greece) 2004 Athens	Swimming	Men's 100m backstroke S7
Bronze	Rodrigo Fernando Lopez	(Greece) 2004 Athens	Cycling	Men's bicycle road race/time trial CP 3
Bronze	Betiana Basualdo	(Greece) 2004 Athens	Swimming	Women's 100m freestyle S2
Silver	Sebastian Baldassarri	(China) 2008 Beijing	Athletics	Men's discus throw F11/12
Bronze	Gonzalo Abbas Hachache; Diego Cerega; Eduardo Diaz; Ivan Figueroa; Jose Luis Jiminez; Dario Aldo Lencina; Gustavo Maidana; Antonio Mendoza; Lucas Rodríguez; Silvio Mauricio Velo	(China) 2008 Beijing	Football 5-a-side	Men's team
Bronze	Fabian Ramirez	(China) 2008 Beijing	Judo	Men's -73 kg
Bronze	Jorge Lencina	(China) 2008 Beijing	Judo	Men's -81 kg
Bronze	Guillermo Marro	(China) 2008 Beijing	Swimming	Men's 100m backstroke S7
Silver	Jose David Effron	(United Kingdom) 2012 London	Judo	Men's -81 kg
Bronze	Hernan Barreto	(United Kingdom) 2012 London	Athletics	Men's 200m T35
Bronze	Rodrigo Fernando Lopez	(United Kingdom) 2012 London	Cycling	Men's individual pursuit C1
Bronze	Jorge Lencina	(United Kingdom) 2012 London	Judo	Men's -90 kg
Bronze	Nadia Baez	(United Kingdom) 2012 London	Swimming	Women's 100m breaststroke SB11
Gold	Yanina Andrea Martinez	(Brazil) 2016 Rio de Janeiro	Athletics	Women's 100m T36
Silver	Hernan Emanuel Urra	(Brazil) 2016 Rio de Janeiro	Athletics	Men's shot put F35
Bronze	Hernan Barreto	(Brazil) 2016 Rio de Janeiro	Athletics	Men's 100m T35
Bronze	Hernan Barreto	(Brazil) 2016 Rio de Janeiro	Athletics	Men's 200m T35
Bronze	Darío Lencina; Ángel Deldo; Federico Accardi; Froilán Padilla; Silvio Velo; Lucas Rodríguez; David Peralta; Nicolás Véliz; Germán Muleck; Maximiliano Espinillo	(Brazil) 2016 Rio de Janeiro	Football 5-a-side	Men's team

== See also ==
- Argentina at the Olympics
