= Football 5-a-side at the 2008 Summer Paralympics =

Football 5-a-side at the XIII Paralympic Games
- Paralympic Football 5-a-side
- Venue: Olympic Green Hockey Field
- Dates: 7–17 September 2008
- Competitors: 6 teams

Medalists
1st place, gold medalist(s)		Brazil	Brazil
2nd place, silver medalist(s)		China	China
3rd place, bronze medalist(s)		Argentina	Argentina

5-a-side football at the 2008 Summer Paralympics was held at the Olympic Green Hockey Field from September 7 and September 17. One event was contested, a men's team competition.

== Classification ==
The tournament was classified as a B1 event, meaning that it was for blind athletes. Athletes wore eyeshades to ensure that vision-impaired and totally blind athletes were level in ability. Goalkeepers could be sighted as long as they had not been registered with FIFA since 2003. Each team was also allowed to have a guide behind their opponents' goal to direct players. The ball made a rattling sound when kicked, so fans were required to keep quiet during play.

== Teams ==
China; Chen Shanyong; Li Xiaoqiang; Wang Yafeng; Wang Zhoubin; Wei Zheng; Xia Zheng; Yang Xinqiang; Yu Yutan; Zhang Qiang; Zheng Wenfa	Argentina; Gonzalo Abbas Hachaché; Diego Cerega; Eduardo Diaz; Ivan Figueroa; Jose Luis Jimenez; Dario Lencina; Gustavo Maidana; Antonio Mendoza; Lucas Rodríguez; Silvio Velo	Great Britain; Ajmal Maqsood Ahmed; Andrew Briant; David Clarke; Lee Greatbatch; Jon Gribbin; Simon Hill; Daniel James; William Norman; Jonathon Pugh; Keryn Seal
South Korea; Hur Suk; Ji Jun Min; Jo Woo Hyung; Kim Jae Sik; Kim Jung Hoon; Kim Kyung Ho; Lee Jin Won; Oh Yong Kyun; Park Meong Su; Yoon Jong Suk	Spain; Adolfo Acosta Rodriguez; Vicente Aguilar Carmona; Alfredo Cuadrado; Pedro Garcia Villa; Carmelo Garrido Alarcon; Jose Manuel Gomez; Alvaro Gonzalez Alcaraz; Jose Lopez; Antonio Martin Gaitan; Marcelo Rosado Carrasco	Brazil; Ricardo Steinmetz Alves; Andreonni Fabrizius; Marcos Felipe; Jeferson Gonçalves; Mizael Oliveira; Damião Robson; Fábio Vasconcelos; João Batista Silva; Severino da Silva; Sandro Laina

== Competition format ==
The six teams started play a single round-robin tournament. Then the top two teams competed for the gold medal, the third and fourth place teams competed for the bronze medal, and the remaining two teams played a match to determine fifth and sixth place.

== Group stage ==
Team	Pld	W	D	L	GF	GA	GD	Pts
China (CHN)	5	4	1	0	7	1	+6	13
Brazil (BRA)	5	3	2	0	10	1	+9	11
Argentina (ARG)	5	3	1	1	7	2	+5	10
Spain (ESP)	5	1	1	3	5	7	−2	4
Great Britain (GBR)	5	1	0	4	4	15	−11	3
South Korea (KOR)	5	0	1	4	3	10	−7	1

2008-09-07
9:30

Argentina	2–0	Spain
Velo 7', 34'

Olympic Green Hockey Field
2008-09-07
11:30

China	3–0	Great Britain
Wang 18', 38'; Chen 29'

Olympic Green Hockey Field
2008-09-07
13:30

Brazil	3–0	South Korea
Goncalves 7'; J Silva 24'; Oliveira 41'

Olympic Green Hockey Field
2008-09-09
09:00

South Korea	1–2	Great Britain
Hur 26'		Clarke 24'; Gribbin 40'

Olympic Green Hockey Field
2008-09-09
11:00

Brazil	1–0	Spain
Goncalves 28'

Olympic Green Hockey Field
2008-09-09
13:00

Argentina	0–1	China
Rodriguez 23' (o.g.)

Olympic Green Hockey Field
2008-09-11
09:00

Brazil	0–0	Argentina

Olympic Green Hockey Field
Attendance: 1,550
Referee: Ilias Mastoras (GRE)
2008-09-11
11:00

China	1–0	South Korea
Li X 13' (pen.)

Olympic Green Hockey Field
Attendance: 1,995
Referee: Ricardo Torino (ARG)
2008-09-11
13:00

Great Britain	1–3	Spain
Clarke 29'		Cuadrado 37'; Rosado 43' (pen.); M.A. Jesus 44' (pen.)

Olympic Green Hockey Field
Attendance: 2,021
Referee: Nelson Luis Glock (BRA)
2008-09-13
9:00

China	1–0	Spain
Zheng W 50'

Olympic Green Hockey Field
2008-09-13
11:00

Great Britain	0–5	Brazil
Ahmed 16' (o.g.)		J Silva 1'; Oliveira 12'; Alves 24', 26'

Olympic Green Hockey Field
2008-09-13
13:00

Argentina	2–0	South Korea
Figueroa 8', Velo 48'

Olympic Green Hockey Field
2008-09-15
9:00

Argentina	3–1	Great Britain
Velo 25', 50'; Figueroa 33'		Greatbatch 28'

Olympic Green Hockey Field
2008-09-15
11:00

South Korea	2–2	Spain
Martin 31' (pen.), 43'		Kim K-h 35' (pen.); Lee J-w 46'

Olympic Green Hockey Field
2008-09-15
13:00

Brazil	1–1	China
Alves 13'		Wang Z 33'

Olympic Green Hockey Field

== Knockout stage ==
=== 5th-6th classification ===
2008-09-17
9:00

Great Britain	1–1 (a.e.t.)	South Korea
Clarke 48'		Oh 17'
Penalties
Seal (penalty missed); Clarke (penalty scored)	1–0	Kim K-h (penalty missed); Kim J-h (penalty missed); Park M-s (penalty missed)

Olympic Green Hockey Field

=== Bronze medal match ===
2008-09-17
11:00

Argentina	1–1 (a.e.t.)	Spain
Velo 42'	(Report)	Martin 1'; Aguilar (yellow card) 30' (red card) 31'; Gonzalez (yellow card) 33'
Penalties
Velo (penalty missed); Figueroa (penalty missed); Cerega (penalty scored)	1–0	(penalty missed) Lopez; (penalty missed) Acosta; (penalty missed) Martin

Olympic Green Hockey Field B
Referee: Nelson Luis Glock (Brazil)

=== Gold medal match ===
2008-09-17
13:30

China	1–2	Brazil
Wang Y 24'	(Report)	Alves 30'; Felipe 50' (pen.)

Olympic Green Hockey Field B
Referee: Ilias Mastoras (Greece)

== Medallists ==
Event	Gold	Silver	Bronze
Men's team	Brazil (BRA) Fábio Ribeiro Vasconcelos (captain); Sandro Soares; Damião Ramos; Severino Silva; Ricardo Alves; Marcos Felipe; Mizael Oliveira; João Batista Silva; Jefferson Gonçalves; Andreonni Farias Rego; Coach: Antônio Pádua Alves da Costa	China (CHN) Li Xiaoqiang (captain); Xia Zheng; Wang Zhoubin; Chen Shanyong; Wang Yafeng; Wei Zheng; Zhang Qiang; Yu Yutan; Yang Xinqiang; Zheng Wenfa; Coach: Dong Junjie	Argentina (ARG) Silvio Velo (captain); Gonzalo Abbas Hachache; Eduardo Diaz; Diego Cerega; Lucas Rodríguez; Dario Lencina; Antonio Mendoza; Gustavo Maidana; Ivan Figueroa; Jose Luis Jimenez; Coach: Gonzalo Vilarino
