= Blind football at the Summer Paralympics =

- Events: 1 (men)

Games
- 1960; 1964; 1968; 1972; 1976; 1980; 1984; 1988; 1992; 1996; 2000; 2004; 2008; 2012; 2016; 2020; 2024
- Medalists

Blind football, also known as football 5-a-side, has been contested at the Summer Paralympics since 2004. The competition has consisted of a single event, men's team; women have never competed. Football 5-a-side is an adaptation of football for athletes with visual impairments including blindness. The sport, governed by the International Blind Sports Federation (IBSA), is played with modified FIFA rules

== Medalists ==
Year	Host	Gold medal game			Bronze medal game		
Year	Host	Gold	Score	Silver	Bronze	Score	4th place
2004; Details	(Greece); Athens	Brazil	0–0 (a.e.t.) (3–2 p)	Argentina	Spain	2–0	Greece
2008; Details	(China); Beijing	Brazil	2–1	China	Argentina	1–1 (a.e.t.) (1–0 p)	Spain
2012; Details	(United Kingdom); London	Brazil	2–0	France	Spain	0–0 (a.e.t.) (1–0 p)	Argentina
2016; Details	(Brazil); Rio de Janeiro	Brazil	1–0	Iran	Argentina	0–0 (a.e.t.) (1–0 p)	China
2020; Details	(Japan); Tokyo	Brazil	1–0	Argentina	Morocco	4–0	China
2024; Details	(France); Paris	France	1–1 (3–2 p)	Argentina	Brazil	1–0	Colombia

=== Medal table ===
Rank	Nation	Gold	Silver	Bronze	Total
1	Brazil (BRA)	5	0	1	6
2	France (FRA)	1	1	0	2
3	Argentina (ARG)	0	3	2	5
4	China (CHN)	0	1	0	1
4	Iran (IRN)	0	1	0	1
6	Spain (ESP)	0	0	2	2
7	Morocco (MAR)	0	0	1	1
Totals (7 entries)		6	6	6	18

== Participating nations ==
- : denotes nation that did not take part that year.

X : denotes nation that did not advance into the final rounds.

Team	(Greece); 2004	(China); 2008	(United Kingdom); 2012	(Brazil); 2016	(Japan); 2020	(France); 2024
Argentina	2nd place, silver medalist(s)	3rd place, bronze medalist(s)	4	3rd place, bronze medalist(s)	2nd place, silver medalist(s)	2nd place, silver medalist(s)
Brazil	1st place, gold medalist(s)	1st place, gold medalist(s)	1st place, gold medalist(s)	1st place, gold medalist(s)	1st place, gold medalist(s)	3rd place, bronze medalist(s)
China	-	2nd place, silver medalist(s)	5	4	4	5
Colombia	-	-	-	-	-	4
France	6	-	2nd place, silver medalist(s)	-	8	1st place, gold medalist(s)
Great Britain	-	5	7	-	-	-
Greece	4	-	-	-	-	-
Iran	-	-	6	2nd place, silver medalist(s)	-	
Japan	-	-	-	-	5	8
Mexico	-	-	-	7	-	-
Morocco	-	-	-	8	3rd place, bronze medalist(s)	6
South Korea	5	6	-	-	-	-
Spain	3rd place, bronze medalist(s)	4	3rd place, bronze medalist(s)	6	6	-
Thailand	-	-	-	-	7	-
Turkey	-	-	8	5	-	7
Total teams	6	6	8	8	8	8

== Complete Results ==
1. https://www.paralympic.org/athens-2004/results/football-5-side
2. https://www.paralympic.org/beijing-2008/results/football-5-side
3. https://www.paralympic.org/london-2012/results/football-5-side
4. https://www.paralympic.org/rio-2016/results/football-5-side
5. https://www.paralympic.org/tokyo-2020/results/football-5-side

== See also ==
- Football 7-a-side at the Summer Paralympics
- Football at the Summer Olympics
