= Damião Robson =

Brazilian five-a-side football player (born 1972)

Personal information
- Full name: Damião Robson de Souza Ramos
- Born: 28 December 1974 (age 51) Cabaceiras, Paraíba, Brazil

Sport
- Country: Brazil
- Sport: Blind football (5-a-side football)
Medal record
Men's Five-a-side football
Representing Brazil
Summer Paralympics
Gold medal – first place	2004 Athens	Men's
Gold medal – first place	2008 Beijing	Men's
Gold medal – first place	2016 Rio de Janeiro	Men's
Gold medal – first place	2020 Tokyo	Men's
Parapan American Games
Gold medal – first place	2007 Rio de Janeiro	Men's
Gold medal – first place	2011 Guadalajara	Men's
Gold medal – first place	2015 Toronto	Men's
World Blind Football Championships
Gold medal – first place	2010 Hereford	Men's
Gold medal – first place	2014 Tokyo	Men's
Gold medal – first place	2018 Madrid	Men's

Damião Robson de Souza Ramos (born 28 December 1974), simply known as Damião Robson is a Brazilian five-a-side football player.

== Career ==
Born in Cabaceiras, Paraíba, Damião lost his sight in a gun accident at the age of 16. At the age of 18, he discovered football for the blind, and became one of the most successful Brazilians in the category, having won the Paralympics four times. Damião also scored the winning goal in the 2022 Brazilian blind football championship for APACE from João Pessoa.

== Honours ==
Summer Paralympics

- Gold medal: 2004, 2008, 2016, 2020

Parapan American Games

- Gold medal: 2007, 2011, 2015

IBSA World Blind Football Championships

- Gold medal: 2010, 2014, 2018

IBSA Blind Football American Championships

- Gold medal: 2009, 2013, 2019
