= Carlos Alvarez =

Carlos Alvarez may refer to:

== Politics ==
- Carlos Álvarez (American politician) (born c. 1952), former mayor of Miami-Dade County
- Carlos Álvarez (Argentine politician) (born 1948), Argentine politician and former vice-president
- Carlos Álvarez (comedian) (born 1964), Peruvian comedian and 2026 presidential candidate

== Sports ==
=== Association football ===
- Carlos Pérez Álvarez (1971–2006), Spanish football midfielder
- Carlos Álvarez Nieto (born 1973), Spanish Paralympic footballer
- Carlos Álvarez (footballer, born 1986), Spanish football striker
- Carlos Alvarez (soccer, born 1990), American soccer coach and former midfielder
- Carlos Álvarez (footballer, born 2003), Spanish football midfielder for América

=== Other sports ===
- Carlos Alberto Álvarez (born 1941), Argentine Olympic cyclist
- Carlos Alvarez (American football) (born 1950), former American college football player
- Carlos Álvarez (athlete) (born 1956), Cuban Olympic sprinter
- Carlos Miguel Álvarez (born 1943), Argentine Olympic cyclist
- Carlos Alvarez (racing driver), see 2014 MW-V6 Pickup Series season

== Other ==
- Carlos Álvarez (baritone) (born 1966), Spanish opera singer
- Carlos Alvarez (professor) (born 1944), accused Cuban spy
- Carlos Felipe Álvarez (born 1983), Venezuelan actor and model
- Carlos Manuel Álvarez (born 1989), Cuban writer
