= Gonzalo Iván Largo Romero =

Spanish 5-a-side footballer

Gonzalo Largo
Personal information
- Full name: Gonzalo Iván Largo Romero
- Nationality: Spanish
- Born: 1 August 1977 (age 48) Madrid, Spain
Medal record
Men's 5-a-side football
Representing Spain
Paralympic Games
Bronze medal – third place	2004 Athens	Team

Gonzalo Iván Largo Romero (born 1 August 1977 in Madrid) is a 5-a-side football player from Spain. He is blind. He played 5-a-side football at the 2004 Summer Paralympics. His team finished third after they played Greece and, won 2–0.
