= Jefinho (Paralympic footballer) =

Brazilian football player

Personal information
- Full name: Jeferson da Conceição Gonçalves
- Born: 5 October 1989 (age 36) Candeias, Bahia, Brazil

Sport
- Country: Brazil
- Sport: Blind football (5-a-side football)
Medal record
Men's five-a-side football
Representing Brazil
Paralympic Games
Gold medal – first place	2008 Beijing	Men's
Gold medal – first place	2012 London	Men's
Gold medal – first place	2016 Rio de Janeiro	Men's
Gold medal – first place	2020 Tokyo	Men's
Bronze medal – third place	2024 Paris	Men's
Parapan American Games
Gold medal – first place	2007 Rio de Janeiro	Men's
Gold medal – first place	2011 Guadalajara	Men's
Gold medal – first place	2015 Toronto	Men's
Gold medal – first place	2019 Lima	Men's
Gold medal – first place	2023 Santiago	Men's
World Blind Football Championships
Gold medal – first place	2010 Hereford	Men's
Gold medal – first place	2014 Tokyo	Men's
Gold medal – first place	2018 Madrid	Men's
Bronze medal – third place	2023 Birmingham	Men's

Jeferson da Conceição Gonçalves (born 5 October 1989) is a Brazilian Paralympic 5-a-side football player.

== Early life ==
Jefinho was born in 1989 in Candeias, Brazil. He became blind at the age of seven after suffering from glaucoma.

== Career ==
Jefinho has been regarded as one of the best blind football players worldwide. He debuted for the Brazil national blind football team in 2006 at the age of fourteen.

He was selected to play at the Rio Parapan American Games and the Beijing Paralympic Games in 2007 and 2008 respectively where he won gold medals at both events.

At London 2012, Jefinho, or the “Paralympic Pelé” as he is sometimes known, also starred in the final, as Brazil beat France 2-0.

In 2014, Jefinho was one of the best players of the tournament at the 2014 World Championships where Brazil retained its world title with a win over Argentina.

== Style of play ==
Jefinho is known for his speed.

== Personal life ==
Jefinho is nicknamed the "Paralympic Pelé" after Brazil international Pelé.
