= Football 5-a-side at the 2016 Summer Paralympics =

Football 5-a-side at the XV Paralympic Games
- Venue: Olympic Tennis Centre
- Dates: 9–17 September 2016
- Competitors: 96 (8 teams) from 8 nations

Medalists
1st place, gold medalist(s)		Brazil
2nd place, silver medalist(s)		Iran
3rd place, bronze medalist(s)		Argentina

Football 5-a-side at the 2016 Summer Paralympics was held in Rio at the Olympic Tennis Centre, from 9 to 17 September. Football 5-a-side was played by athletes with visual impairment, with a ball with a noise making device inside.

For these games, the men competed in an 8-team tournament. Brazil were hosts, reigning three times Paralympic champions, and the favorites since they won both in Athens 2004, Beijing 2008 and London 2012; they were also the defending world and PanAmerican champions.

== Classification ==
The International Paralympic Committee recognizes three classifications for the purposes of this event, all involving various degrees of limited sight, ranging from total lack of sight to the ability to make out shapes at short distances – B1, B2 and B3. However, the event is made fair and open to all abilities within the broader classification by the use of eyemasks by all players.

== Medallists ==
Event	Gold	Silver	Bronze
Men's team	Brazil (BRA); Luan de Lacerda; Cássio Lopes dos Reis; Damião Robson; Tiago da Silva; Jeferson da Conceição; Raimundo Nonato; Marcos Felipe; Ricardo Alves; Maurício Tchopi Dumbo; Vinícius Tranchezzi	Iran (IRI); Meysam Shojaeiyan; Amir Pourrazavi; Mohammadreza Mehninasab; Hossein Rajabpour; Mohammad Heidari; Sadegh Rahimighasr; Behzad Zadaliasghari; Ahmadreza Shahhosseini; Rasool Baseri; Akbar Shoushtari	Argentina (ARG); Darío Lencina; Ángel Deldo; Federico Accardi; Froilán Padilla; Silvio Velo; Lucas Rodríguez; David Peralta; Nicolás Véliz; Germán Muleck; Maximiliano Espinillo

== Qualification ==
Eight teams will contest the competition, which is for male athletes only.

An NPC can enter a single squad, consisting of eight players, plus 2 sighted goalkeepers – goalkeepers are not included in the athlete quota of 64; both goalkeepers however, in line with Paralympic practice on able bodied guides and competitors' in other events, are eligible for medals.

Football 5-a-side at 2016 Summer Paralympics – Qualification
Means of qualification	Date	Venue	Berths	Qualified
Host nation	2 October 2009	Copenhagen, Denmark	1	Brazil (BRA)
2014 IBSA World Blind Football Championship	13–25 November 2014	Tokyo, Japan	1	Argentina (ARG)
2015 Asian Championship	30 August-8 September 2015	Tokyo, Japan	2	Iran (IRI); China (CHN)
2015 IBSA Football 5-a-side European Championships	22–29 August 2015	Hereford, United Kingdom	2	Turkey (TUR); Spain (ESP)
2015 Parapan American Games	8–15 August 2015	Toronto, Canada	1	Mexico (MEX)
2015 IBSA Football 5-a-side African Championships	16–25 October 2015	Douala, Cameroon	1	Morocco (MAR)
Total			8	

== Tournament ==
=== Group A ===
Pos	Team	Pld	W	D	L	GF	GA	GD	Pts	Qualification
1	Brazil (H)	3	2	1	0	5	1	+4	7	Semi finals
2	Iran	3	1	2	0	2	0	+2	5	Semi finals
3	Turkey	3	0	2	1	1	3	−2	2	5th–6th place match
4	Morocco	3	0	1	2	2	6	−4	1	7th–8th place match

Source: Paralympic.org
(H) Hosts
9 September 2016
9:00

Brazil	3–1	Morocco
Ricardinho 31'; Jefinho 36'; Nonato 36'	Report	Hattab 13'

Olympic Tennis Centre, Rio de Janeiro
Attendance: 2,569
Referee: Mariano Travaglino (Argentina)
9 September 2016
16:00

Turkey	0–0	Iran
	Report

Olympic Tennis Centre, Rio de Janeiro
Attendance: 2,811
Referee: Lucio Morgado (Brazil)
11 September 2016
9:00

Morocco	0–2	Iran
	Report	Rajabpour 13'; Zadaliasghari 14'

Olympic Tennis Centre, Rio de Janeiro
Attendance: 2,374
Referee: Mariano Travaglino (Argentina)
11 September 2016
16:00

Brazil	2–0	Turkey
Ricardinho 13'; Cássio 37' (pen.)	Report

Olympic Tennis Centre, Rio de Janeiro
Attendance: 2,596
Referee: François Carcouët (France)
13 September 2016
9:00

Brazil	0–0	Iran
	Report

Olympic Tennis Centre, Rio de Janeiro
Attendance: 2,355
Referee: Mariano Travaglino (Argentina)
13 September 2016
16:00

Morocco	1–1	Turkey
Snisla 27'	Report	Öcal 25'

Olympic Tennis Centre, Rio de Janeiro
Attendance: 1,933
Referee: Germi Guimaraes (Brazil)

=== Group B ===
Pos	Team	Pld	W	D	L	GF	GA	GD	Pts	Qualification
1	Argentina	3	2	1	0	3	0	+3	7	Semi finals
2	China	3	2	1	0	3	0	+3	7	Semi finals
3	Spain	3	1	0	2	1	2	−1	3	5th–6th place match
4	Mexico	3	0	0	3	0	5	−5	0	7th–8th place match

Source: Paralympic.org
9 September 2016
11:00

Spain	0–1	China
	Report	Wang Z. 43'

Olympic Tennis Centre, Rio de Janeiro
Attendance: 2,569
Referee: Germi Guimaraes (Brazil)
9 September 2016
20:00

Argentina	2–0	Mexico
Espinillo 2'; Velo 15'	Report

Olympic Tennis Centre, Rio de Janeiro
Attendance: 3,065
Referee: Germi Guimaraes (Brazil)
11 September 2016
11:00

Argentina	1–0	Spain
Véliz 29'	Report

Olympic Tennis Centre, Rio de Janeiro
Attendance: 2,374
Referee: Lucio Morgado (Brazil)
11 September 2016
20:00

China	2–0	Mexico
Wei 4'; Wang Y. 9'	Report

Olympic Tennis Centre, Rio de Janeiro
Attendance: 3,099
Referee: Germi Guimaraes (Brazil)
13 September 2016
11:00

China	0–0	Argentina
	Report

Olympic Tennis Centre, Rio de Janeiro
Attendance: 2,355
Referee: François Carcouët (France)
13 September 2016
20:00

Mexico	0–1	Spain
	Report	Acosta 14'

Olympic Tennis Centre, Rio de Janeiro
Attendance: 3,080
Referee: Rafael Glock (Brazil)

== Knockout stage ==
=== Classification round ===
==== 7th–8th place match ====
15 September 2016
09:00

Morocco	0–2	Mexico
	Report	Lanzagorta 42'; De la Cruz 49'

Olympic Tennis Centre, Rio de Janeiro
Attendance: 971
Referee: Christian Jung (Germany)

==== 5th–6th place match ====
15 September 2016
11:00

Turkey	0–0	Spain
	Report
Penalties
Sümer (penalty scored); Şatay (penalty missed); Öcal (penalty missed)	1–0	(penalty missed) El Haddaqui; (penalty missed) Muñoz; (penalty missed) Garrido

Olympic Tennis Centre, Rio de Janeiro
Attendance: 971
Referee: Stuart Winton (Great Britain)

=== Medal round ===
Semifinals
15 September 16:00
Brazil	2
China	1
15 September 20:00
Argentina	0(1)
Iran	0(2)

Gold Medal Match
17 September 17:00
Brazil	1
Iran	0
Bronze medal
17 September 14:00
China	0(0)
Argentina	0(1)

==== Semi-finals ====
15 September 2016
16:00

Brazil	2–1	China
Jefinho 20', 30'	Report	Wang Y. 14'

Olympic Tennis Centre, Rio de Janeiro
Attendance: 3,026
Referee: Mariano Travaglino (Argentina)
15 September 2016
20:00

Argentina	0–0	Iran
	Report
Penalties
Espinillo (penalty missed); Velo (penalty scored); Véliz (penalty missed)	1–2	(penalty scored) Rahimighasr; (penalty scored) Shahhosseini

Olympic Tennis Centre, Rio de Janeiro
Attendance: 2,907
Referee: Lucio Morgado (Brazil)

==== Bronze medal match ====
17 September 2016
14:00

China	0–0	Argentina
	Report
Penalties
Wei (penalty missed); Liu (penalty missed); Wang Y. (penalty missed)	0–1	(penalty scored) Espinillo; (penalty missed) Velo

Olympic Tennis Centre, Rio de Janeiro
Attendance: 2,900
Referee: Germi Guimaraes (Brazil)

==== Gold medal match ====
17 September 2016
17:00

Brazil	1–0	Iran
Ricardinho 12'	Report

Olympic Tennis Centre, Rio de Janeiro
Attendance: 3,118
Referee: Mariano Travaglino (Argentina)

== Final rankings ==
Rank	Team
Gold medal	Brazil
Silver medal	Iran
Bronze medal	Argentina
4.	China
5.	Turkey
6.	Spain
7.	Mexico
8.	Morocco

Source: Paralympic.org

== See also ==
- Football 7-a-side at the 2016 Summer Paralympics
- Football at the 2016 Summer Olympics
