= José Urbano (football) =

Spanish Paralympic coach (born 1972)

Personal information
- Full name: José F Urbano Martos
- Nationality: Spanish
- Born: December 9, 1972 (age 53) Málaga

Sport
- Country: Spain
- Sport: 5-a-side football

José F Urbano Martos is a 5-a-side football team coach from Spain, who has coached at the regional and international level, including the national team at the 2012 Summer Paralympics that won a bronze medal.

== Personal ==
Urbano was born on 9 December 1972 in Málaga. At the 2012 Gala of Sports Journalists of Andalusia, he earned a Sports Effort award. In 2013, he was awarded the bronze Real Orden al Mérito Deportivo.

== 5-a-side football ==
Urbano has served as the coach of the Spain national 5-a-side football team.

Urbano was the coach of the ONCE Málaga para ciegos team from 1999 to 2008, when they won six league championships, 5 Spanish championships and one Supercopa. In 2009, he published a book titled "Fundamentos Del Futbol Sala Para Ciegos", a Spanish language book about the fundamentals of blind football. He coached the national team at the 2012 Summer Paralympics; thy won a bronze medal after defeating Argentina in a penalty shootout in the bronze medal match. In July 2012, he and other local Olympians and Paralympians were received by Mayor of Málaga, Francisco de la Torre, at the town hall as part of a reception in their honour. In late 2012, the government of Malaga announced they would construct the first blind purpose-built football pitch in the country, because the national team had a number of players based there and Urbano lives in Malaga. In November 2012, a program aired where Urbano and other players from Malaga taught Spain national football team and Valencia FC player Roberto Soldado how to play the game. Urbano was the coach of the ONCE Málaga in 2012 and 2013, with Marcelo Rosado Carrasco being the captain of the club. For the 2013 season, Málaga CF provided the kit for his ONCE team that matched CD Málaga's own.
