= Gonzalo Abbas Hachaché =

Personal information
- Born: 16 July 1981 (age 44) Córdoba, Argentina

Sport
- Sport: Football 5-a-side
Medal record
Representing Argentina
Paralympic Games
Silver medal – second place	2004 Athens	Men's tournament
Bronze medal – third place	2008 Beijing	Men's tournament
World Championships
Gold medal – first place	2002 Rio de Janeiro	Men's tournament
Gold medal – first place	2006 Buenos Aires	Men's tournament

Gonzalo Abbas Hachaché (born 16 July 1981) is an Argentine retired goalkeeper and football coach. He is a two-time Paralympic medalist and played for Los Murciélagos.

Abba Hachaché coaches the Argentine blind football women's team, he has done so since 2022.
