= Paraguay at the 2024 Summer Paralympics =

- IPC code: PAR
- NPC: Paraguayan Paralympic Committee

in Paris, France August 28, 2024 – September 8, 2024
- Competitors: 1 in 1 sport
- Flag bearer: Melissa Nair Tillner
- Medals: Gold 0 Silver 0 Bronze 0 Total 0

Summer Paralympics appearances (overview)
- 2020; 2024

Paraguay competed at the 2024 Summer Paralympics in Paris, France, from 28 August to 8 September 2024. The delegation consisted of only one competitor from one sport.

== Competitors ==
The following is the list of number of competitors in the Games.

Sport	Men	Women	Total
Athletics	0	1	1
Total	0	1	1

== Athletics ==
Athlete	Event	Heat		Final	
Athlete	Event	Result	Rank	Result	Rank
Melissa Nair Tillner	Women's 100 metres T12	15.48	4	Did not advance	16
Melissa Nair Tillner	Women's 200 metres T12	33.74	4	Did not advance	19

== See also ==
- Paraguay at the 2024 Summer Olympics
- Paraguay at the Paralympics
