= Ricardinho (Paralympic footballer) =

Brazilian football-5-a-side player

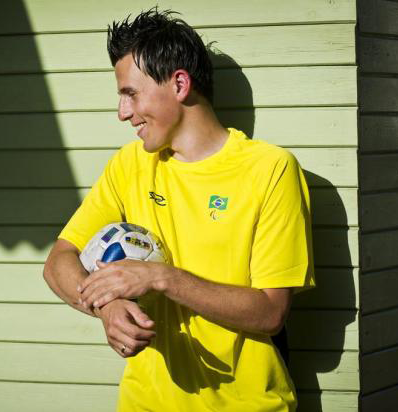

Personal information
- Full name: Ricardo Steinmetz Alves
- Born: 15 December 1988 (age 37) Osório, Rio Grande do Sul, Brazil

Sport
- Country: Brazil
- Sport: Blind football (5-a-side football)
Medal record
Men's Five-a-side football
Representing Brazil
Summer Paralympics
Gold medal – first place	2008 Beijing	Men's
Gold medal – first place	2012 London	Men's
Gold medal – first place	2016 Rio de Janeiro	Men's
Gold medal – first place	2020 Tokyo	Men's
Bronze medal – third place	2024 Paris	Men's
Parapan American Games
Gold medal – first place	2007 Rio de Janeiro	Men's
Gold medal – first place	2011 Guadalajara	Men's
Gold medal – first place	2015 Toronto	Men's
Gold medal – first place	2019 Lima	Men's
Gold medal – first place	2023 Santiago	Men's
World Blind Football Championships
Gold medal – first place	2010 Hereford	Men's
Gold medal – first place	2014 Tokyo	Men's
Gold medal – first place	2018 Madrid	Men's
Silver medal – second place	2006 Buenos Aires	Men's
Bronze medal – third place	2023 Birmingham	Men's

Ricardo Steinmetz Alves (born 15 December 1988) is a Brazilian five-a-side football player.

== Career ==
Born in Osório, Rio Grande do Sul, Ricardinho lost his sight at the age of 8 due to toxoplasmosis. At 10, he started playing football for the blind, reaching the national team in 2005. He was named the best 5-a-side football player three times, in 2006, 2014 and 2018.

== Honours ==
Summer Paralympics

- Gold medal: 2008, 2012, 2016, 2020
- Bronze medal: 2024

Parapan American Games

- Gold medal: 2007, 2011, 2015, 2019, 2023

IBSA World Blind Football Championships

- Gold medal: 2010, 2014, 2018
- Silver medal: 2006
- Bronze medal: 2023

IBSA Blind Football World Grand Prix

- Gold medal: 2022, 2023

IBSA World Games

- Gold medal: 2007

IBSA Blind Football American Championships

- Gold medal: 2009, 2013, 2019
- Silver medal: 2005, 2017, 2022
