= Paraguay at the Paralympics =

- IPC code: PAR
- NPC: Paraguayan Paralympic Committee
- Website: comiteparalimpicoparaguayo.org.py
- Medals: Gold 0 Silver 0 Bronze 0 Total 0

Summer appearances
- 2020; 2024

Paraguay made its Paralympic Games début at the 2020 Summer Paralympics in Tokyo, sending two competitors: T12 runner Melissa Nair Tillner Galeano and S9 swimmer Rodrigo Hermosa. It has competed in every edition of the Summer Paralympics since then, but has never entered the Winter Paralympics.

== Medals ==
=== Medals by Summer Games ===
Games	Athletes	Gold	Silver	Bronze	Total	Rank
(Italy) Rome 1960	Did not participate					
(Japan) Tokyo 1964	Did not participate					
(Israel) Tel Aviv 1968	Did not participate					
(West Germany) Heidelberg 1972	Did not participate					
(Canada) Toronto 1976	Did not participate					
(Netherlands) Arnhem 1980	Did not participate					
(United States) New York 1984/ (United Kingdom) Stoke Mandeville 1984	Did not participate					
(South Korea) Seoul 1988	Did not participate					
(Spain) Barcelona 1992	Did not participate					
(United States) Atlanta 1996	Did not participate					
(Australia) Sydney 2000	Did not participate					
(Greece) Athens 2004	Did not participate					
(China) Beijing 2008	Did not participate					
(United Kingdom) London 2012	Did not participate					
(Brazil) Rio de Janeiro 2016	Did not participate					
(Japan) Tokyo 2020	2	0	0	0	0	−
(France) Paris 2024	1	0	0	0	0	−
Total		0	0	0	0	0

== See also ==
- Paraguay at the Olympics
