= Carlos Maslup =

Argentine para table tennis player and swimmer

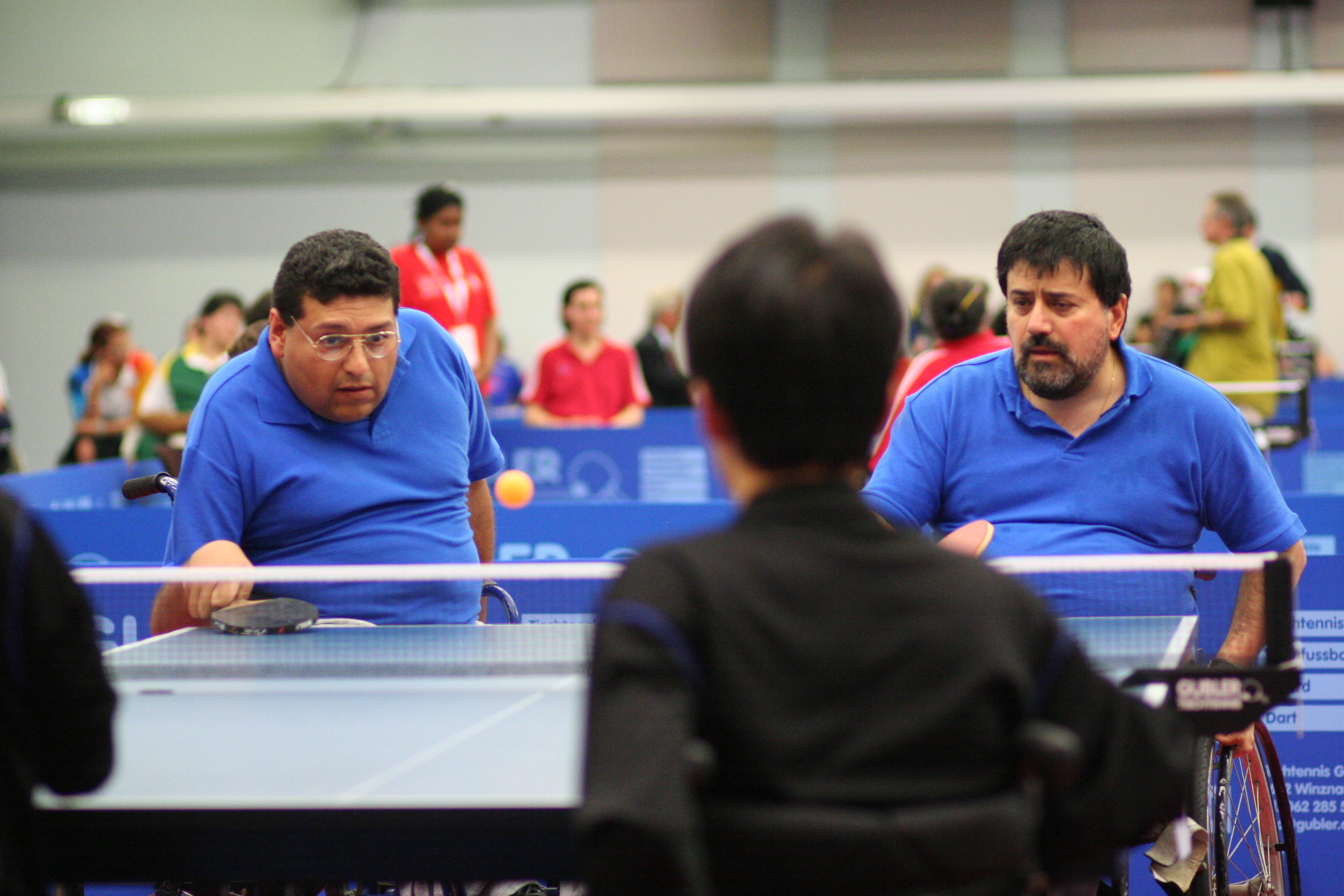
- Carlos Raul Maslup and Daniel Haylan vs. Korea

Personal information
- Full name: Carlos Raul Maslup
- Born: 9 January 1959 Godoy Cruz, Mendoza, Argentina
- Died: 23 August 2007 (aged 48) Rio de Janeiro, Brazil

Sport
- Country: Argentina
- Sport: Para table tennis
- Disability class: C1
Medal record
Para table tennis
Representing Argentina
Pan American Championships
| Gold medal – first place | 2005 Mar del Plata | Singles C1 |
| Silver medal – second place | 2003 Brasília | Singles C1 |
| Bronze medal – third place | 2003 Brasília | Teams C1-2 |
Parapan American Games
| Bronze medal – third place | 2007 Rio de Janeiro | Singles C1 |
Paralympic swimming
Paralympic Games
| Silver medal – second place | 1988 Seoul | 25m breaststroke 1A |
| Silver medal – second place | 1988 Seoul | 75m individual medley 1A |
Paralympic athletics
Paralympic Games
| Silver medal – second place | 1988 Seoul | Slalom 1A |
| Bronze medal – third place | 1988 Seoul | Discus throw 1A |

Carlos Raul Maslup (9 January 1959 – 23 August 2007) was an Argentine para table tennis player who competed in international elite competitions. He was a Pan American singles' champion, Parapan American Games bronze medalist in the men's singles and competed at the 2004 Summer Paralympics. He was also a Paralympic swimmer and Paralympic athlete at the 1988 Summer Paralympics where he won three silver medals and one bronze medal.

At the 2007 Parapan American Games in Rio de Janeiro, Maslup competed at his second Parapan American Games and won a bronze medal in the men's singles class 1. On 19 August, on the day of the multi-sport event's closing ceremony, Maslup had a stroke in a hotel and he was first taken to the Miguel Couto Hospital but there were no beds available and so he was transferred to the Salgado Filho Hospital. Maslup was in a coma for three days and was diagnosed as brain dead by the hospital doctors on 22 August and died on 23 August in an intensive care unit at the Salgado Filho Hospital.
