= Pedro Antonio García Villa =

Spanish 5-a-side footballer (born 1973)

Personal information
- Nationality: Spanish

Sport
- Country: Spain
- Sport: 5-a-side football
Medal record
5-a-side football
Representing Spain
Paralympic Games
| Bronze medal – third place | 2004 Athens | Men's team |

Pedro Antonio García Villa (born 26 January 1973 in Murcia) is a 5-a-side football player from Spain. He has a disability: he is blind. He played 5-a-side football at the 2004 Summer Paralympics. His team finished third after they played Greece and won 2–0.
