= Alfredo Cuadrado =

Spanish footballer (born 1969)

Personal information
- Full name: Alfredo Cuadrado Freire
- Nationality: Spanish
- Born: 2 May 1969 (age 57) Madrid, Spain

Sport
- Country: Spain
- Sport: 5-a-side football
Medal record
5-a-side football
Representing Spain
Paralympic Games
Bronze medal – third place	2004 Athens	Men's team
Bronze medal – third place	2012 London	Men's team

Alfredo Cuadrado Freire (Note: In this Spanish name, the first or paternal surname is Cuadrado and the second or maternal family name is Freire.) (born 2 May 1969), commonly known as Alfredo Cuadrado, is a 5-a-side football player from Spain.

== Personal ==
Cuadrado was born on 2 May 1969 in Madrid. He has a disability: he is blind and is a B1 type sportsperson. He continued to live in Madrid in 2012.

In 2013, he was awarded the bronze Real Orden al Mérito Deportivo.

== 5-a-side football ==
Cuadrado is affiliated with the DZ Malaga sport federation.

He played 5-a-side football at the 2004 Summer Paralympics. His team finished third after they played Greece and, won 2–0.

In August 2011, Cuadrado was part of the Spanish team that competed in the Spanish organized International Futsal Friendly Tournament held in Madrid. The team played against Argentina, England, Turkey, and Italy.

He competed in the 2010 World Championships where he represented Spain. In 2011, he represented Spain in the Turkey hosted European Championships. His team was faced Turkey, Russia and Greece in the group stage.

The Italian-hosted European Championships were played in June 2012, and were the last major competition for him and his team prior to the start of the Paralympic Games. He was coached in the competition by Miguel Ángel Becerra, and participated in daily fitness activities to help with preparations for the Championship and Paralympic Games. On 7 June he took a medical test to clear participation in the Paralympic Games.

Cuadrado played 5-a-side football at the 2012 Summer Paralympics. His team finished third after they played Argentina and, won 1–0. The bronze medal game was watched by Infanta Elena and President of the Spanish Paralympic Committee. In the team's opening game against Great Britain, the game ended in a 1–1 draw.

He was a member of the national team in 2013 and competed in the European Championships. The team faced Russia, Greece and France in the group stage. His team won their opener against Russia. His team went on to defeat France and finish first in the competition.
