= José López Ramírez =

Spanish 5-a-side footballer (born 1975)

José López
Personal information
- Full name: José López Ramírez
- Nationality: Spanish
- Born: 17 December 1975 (age 50) Málaga, Spain
Medal record
Men's 5-a-side football
Representing Spain
Paralympic Games
| Bronze medal – third place | 2004 Athens | Team |
| Bronze medal – third place | 2012 London | Team |

José López Ramírez (born 17 December 1975 in Málaga) is a 5-a-side football player from Spain.

== Personal ==
López was born 17 December 1975 in Málaga. He has a disability: he is blind and is a B1 type sportsperson. From the Catalan region of Spain, he was a recipient of a 2012 Plan ADO scholarship.

== 5-a-side football ==
López is affiliated with the DA Tarragona sport federation.

López played 5-a-side football at the 2004 Summer Paralympics. His team finished third after they played Greece and, won 2–0. He played 5-a-side football at the 2008 Summer Paralympics. In pool play, his team met China whom they lost to by a score of 1–0. His team finished fourth, losing to Argentina in the bronze medal game on penalty kicks. In August 2011, he was part of the Spanish team that competed in the Spanish organized International Futsal Friendly Tournament held in Madrid. The team played against Argentina, England, Turkey, and Italy. In 2011, he represented Spain in the Turkey hosted European Championships. His team was faced Turkey, Russia and Greece in the group stage. In 2013, he was awarded the bronze Real Orden al Mérito Deportivo. The Italian hosted European Championships was played in June 2012, and were the last major competition for him and his team prior to the start of the Paralympic Games. He was coached in the competition by Miguel Ángel Becerra, and participated in daily fitness activities to help with preparations for the Championship and Paralympic Games. On June 7, he took a medical test to clear participation in the Paralympic Games. He played 5-a-side football at the 2012 Summer Paralympics. His team finished third after they played Argentina and, won 1–0. The bronze medal game was watched by Infanta Elena and President of the Spanish Paralympic Committee. In the team's opening game against Great Britain, the game ended in a 1–1 draw.
