= 2014 IBSA World Blind Football Championship =

Tournament details
- Host country: Japan
- Dates: 16 – 24 November
- Teams: 12 (from 5 confederations)
- Venue: Tokyo (in 1 host city)

Final positions
- Champions: Brazil (4th title)
- Runners-up: Argentina
- Third place: Spain
- Fourth place: China

Tournament statistics
- Top scorer: Ricardo Alves (Brazil)

The 2014 IBSA World Blind Football Championship is a blind football tournament and the sixth World Blind Football Championship. The competition was staged in Japan between 16 and 25 November 2014, and involved twelve teams of visually impaired players from around the world competing to be crowned world champion. It was won for the fourth time by Brazil, who defeated their fellow finalists, Argentina, 1–0 to take the title.

== Group stage ==
=== Group A ===
Pos	Team	Pld	W	D	L	GF	GA	GD	Pts	Qualification
1	Paraguay	3	2	0	1	4	1	+3	6	Quarter-finals
2	Japan (H)	3	1	2	0	2	1	+1	5	Quarter-finals
3	Morocco	3	0	2	1	0	1	−1	2	9th–12th place match
4	France	3	0	2	1	1	4	−3	2	9th–12th place match

Source: blindfootball.sport
(H) Hosts
16 November 2014

Japan	1–0	Paraguay

Tokyo
16 November 2014

Morocco	0–0	France

Tokyo

18 November 2014

Paraguay	3–0	France

Tokyo
18 November 2014

Japan	0–0	Morocco

Tokyo

19 November 2014

Morocco	0–1	Paraguay

Tokyo
19 November 2014

France	1–1	Japan

Tokyo

=== Group B ===
Pos	Team	Pld	W	D	L	GF	GA	GD	Pts	Qualification
1	Brazil	3	2	1	0	4	1	+3	7	Quarter-finals
2	China	3	1	2	0	1	0	+1	5	Quarter-finals
3	Colombia	3	1	0	2	2	4	−2	3	Quarter-finals
4	Turkey	3	0	1	2	0	2	−2	1	9th–12th place match

Source: blindfootball.sport
17 November 2014

Brazil	1–0	Turkey

Tokyo
17 November 2014

China	1–0	Colombia

Tokyo

18 November 2014

Colombia	1–3	Brazil

Tokyo
19 November 2014

China	0–0	Turkey

Tokyo

20 November 2014

Brazil	0–0	China

Tokyo
20 November 2014

Turkey	0–1	Colombia

Tokyo

=== Group C ===
Pos	Team	Pld	W	D	L	GF	GA	GD	Pts	Qualification
1	Argentina	3	2	1	0	3	1	+2	7	Quarter-finals
2	Germany	3	0	3	0	1	1	0	3	Quarter-finals
3	Spain	3	0	2	1	1	2	−1	2 (Note: A penalty shoot-out was used as a tiebreaker.)	Quarter-finals
4	South Korea	3	0	2	1	1	2	−1	2	9th–12th place match

Source: blindfootball.sport
Notes:
17 November 2014

South Korea	0–0	Germany

Tokyo
17 November 2014

Spain	0–1	Argentina

Tokyo

18 November 2014

Germany	1–1	Spain

Tokyo
19 November 2014

Argentina	2–1	South Korea

Tokyo

20 November 2014

Spain	0–0	South Korea
Penalties
	2–1

Tokyo
20 November 2014

Germany	0–0	Argentina

Tokyo

=== Ranking of third-placed teams ===
Pos	Team	Pld	W	D	L	GF	GA	GD	Pts	Qualification
1	Colombia	3	1	0	2	2	4	−2	3	Quarter-finals
2	Spain	3	0	2	1	1	2	−1	2	Quarter-finals
3	Morocco	3	0	2	1	0	1	−1	2	9th–12th place match

Updated to match(es) played on unknown. Source: blindfootball.sport

== Knockout stage ==
=== Main tournament ===
Quarterfinals
2A	Japan	0 (1)
2B	China (p)	0 (2)
1B	Brazil	4
2C	Germany	0
1A	Paraguay	0 (0)
3C	Spain (p)	0 (2)
1C	Argentina	1
3B	Colombia	0

Semifinals
Q1	China	1
Q2	Brazil	2
Q3	Spain	0 (1)
Q4	Argentina (p)	0 (2)

Finals
S1	Brazil	1
S2	Argentina	0
Third place
L1	China	0 (0)
L2	Spain (p)	0 (2)

=== 5th–8th place ===
Semifinals
L1	Japan	1
L2	Germany	0
L3	Paraguay (p)	1 (2)
L4	Colombia	1 (1)

5th place
W1	Japan	0 (0)
W2	Paraguay (p)	0 (1)
7th place
L1	Germany	0
L2	Colombia	1

=== 9th–12th place ===
Semifinals
4B	Turkey	0
4C	South Korea	1
4A	France	1
3A	Morocco	0

9th place
W1	South Korea	1
W2	France	2
11th place
L1	Turkey (p)	0 (1)
L2	Morocco	0 (0)

== Final ranking ==
Place	Team
1st place, gold medalist(s)	Brazil
2nd place, silver medalist(s)	Argentina
3rd place, bronze medalist(s)	Spain
4	China
5	Paraguay
6	Japan
7	Colombia
8	Germany
9	France
10	South Korea
11	Turkey
12	Morocco
