= Plan ADOP =

Plan ADOP (Spanish: Plan ADO Paralímpico) is designed to assist elite disabled sportspeople in Spain to prepare for the Paralympic Games. Created in 2005, it has supported sportspeople competing at the 2006 Winter Paralympics, 2008 Summer Paralympics, 2010 Winter Paralympics and 2012 Summer Paralympics. Sponsors have included Santa Lucia Seguros and Iberdrola.

== Purpose ==
Plan ADOP is designed to assist elite disabled sportspeople in Spain prepare for the Paralympic Games. Selection criteria prior to 2008 was based on results performance. If you failed to perform, your scholarship was not renewed or you would not be in consideration for a new scholarship.

== History ==
Plan ADOP was instituted in 2005, with funding for it going to the Spanish Paralympic Committee. Funding for Plan ADO comes from companies and businesses who sponsor athletes, events, federations and teams. Miguel Carballeda, President of the Spanish Paralympic Committee who came into office in December 2004, was one of the drivers in instituting Plan ADOP.

Between 2005 and 2008, Plan ADOP brought in an additional €17.5 million to support preparations for the Spanish Paralympic team delegations at the 2006 Winter Paralympics, 2008 Summer Paralympics and 2010 Winter Paralympics. The funds directly benefited 390 competitors and 135 technical support personnel like coaches. The CPE manages the allocation of the Plan ADOP funding to athletes and others. In 2008, following Carballeda's re-election as President, Plan ADOP did some consolidating as part of overall efforts at social diffusion of Paralympic sport in Spain. Plan ADOP money was used to assist in preparing sportspeople for London.

== Sponsors ==
=== London 2012 ===
During the London 2012 Paralympic Cycle, a total of 16 brands accompanied the Spanish Paralympic Team on their way to the Games as sponsors of it and the ADOP Plan. They should be highlighted AXA, El Corte Inglés, Sanitas, Persán, Liberty Seguros, Gadisa, Telefónica, Calidad Pascual, Groupama, Iberdrola and Renfe, which started from the beginning of the cycle, in 2009. Later, in 2011, they joined this list brands as Unidental, Cofidis, Santa Lucía, Norauto and Ford. In total, the sponsoring brands contributed 14 million euros to the preparation of the Spanish Paralympic Team for this cycle. In addition, the Spanish Paralympic Committee had the collaboration of entities such as Fundación ONCE, Fundación ACS, Fundación Cultural Banesto, Caja Madrid, Fundación Iberdrola, Fundación Mapfre and Fundación Adecco.

Within this paralympic cycle, a couple of projects to support grassroots sport also appear. These are the AXA Team of Paralympic Swimming Promises and the Liberty Team Insurance of Paralympic Athletics Promises, whose objectives are to attract swimmers and young athletes, train them and achieve a high level of performance in the medium and long term, through technical plans training and specialization, attendance at national and international competitions, and support for coaches and clubs, with the goal of their possible participation in some Paralympic Games.

=== Rio 2016 ===
For the next paralympic cycle, which led to the Rio 2016 Games, the Spanish Paralympic Committee had the support of a total of a 30 sponsoring brands. On this occasion, the Spanish team was joined by firms such as Loterías y Apuestas del Estado (2014), Cerealto Siro Foods (2015), Repsol (2015), ElPozo (2015), Decathlon (2015), Viajes Barceló (2015), MGS Seguros (2016), Iberia (2016), Luanvi (2016), Correos (2016) and Pelayo Seguros (2016). In that moment, the amount of aid from the sponsors to the ADOP Plan and the preparation of athletes for the Rio Paralympic Games was totaled 21.5 million euros. And on this occasion, the following entities collaborated: Fundación Banco Santander, Fundación ACS, Fundación Cultural Banesto, Caja Madrid, Red Electrica de España, and Fundación Trinidad Alfonso.

=== Tokyo 2020 ===
And we present ourselves in the current Paralympic cycle, which will lead to the Tokyo Games in 2021. Almost thirty brands are sponsors of the ADOP Plan. For this last period, entities such as Idilia Foods (2017), Sanitas (2017), Liga Nacional de Fútbol Profesional (2018), Caixabank (2018), Ambar (2018) and ALDI (2019) join the paralympic family. In the current cycle that will conclude with the Tokyo Games, finally in 2021, the sponsors exceed by just over 16 million euros their contributions so far.

For this last period of Paralympic cycles, a new support program for young athletes with disabilities emerged. This is the Cofidis Team of Paralympic Cycling Promises. This program is intended to detect new talents in Paralympic cycling and promote their careers.

Spanish insurance company Santa Lucía Seguros held an official ceremony to announce their sponsorship of the Spanish Paralympic Committee, and consequently Plan ADOP which funds high performance Spanish disability sport competitors, in December 2013. One of the Plan ADOP sponsors for the period between 2013 and 2016 is Iberdrola, with the announcement made in July 2013.
