= Diego Cerega =

Argentine blind footballer (born 1976)

Personal information
- Born: 24 September 1976 (age 49) San Isidro, Buenos Aires, Argentina

Sport
- Sport: 5-a-side football
- Disability: Glaucoma
Medal record
Representing Argentina
Paralympic Games
Silver medal – second place	2004 Athens	Team
Bronze medal – third place	2008 Beijing	Team
Parapan American Games
Silver medal – second place	2007 Rio de Janeiro	Team

Diego Cerega (born 24 September 1976) is an Argentinian retired blind footballer. He has competed at the 2004 and 2008 Summer Paralympics.

In 2020, Cerega became the world's first blind football coach and technical director for Fundación Paradeportes GoGol, a blind football team that is part of Cañuelas FC.
