= Carlos Álvarez Nieto =

Spanish five-a-side football player

Carlos Álvarez
Personal information
- Full name: Carlos Álvarez Nieto
- Nationality: Spanish
- Born: 24 January 1973 (age 53) Madrid, Spain

Sport
- Country: Spain
- Sport: Five-a-side football
Medal record
Men's 5-a-side football
Representing Spain
Paralympic Games
Bronze medal – third place	2004 Athens	Team

Carlos Álvarez Nieto (born 24 January 1973 in Madrid) is a five-a-side football player from Spain. He has a disability: he is blind. He played five-a-side football at the 2004 Summer Paralympics. His team finished third after they played Greece and, won 2–0.
