= List of Paralympic medalists in blind football =

Football 5-a-side or blind football is a sport that has been competed since the 2004 Summer Paralympics. The contest is a single event played by men but not women, so far Brazil have won all the time.

== Medalists ==
| Event | Gold | Silver | Bronze |
|---|---|---|---|
| 2004 Athens | Brazil (BRA) | Argentina (ARG) | Spain (ESP) |
| 2008 Beijing | Brazil (BRA) | China (CHN) | Argentina (ARG) |
| 2012 London | Brazil (BRA) | France (FRA) | Spain (ESP) |
| 2016 Rio de Janeiro | Brazil (BRA) | Iran (IRI) | Argentina (ARG) |
| 2020 Tokyo | Brazil (BRA) | Argentina (ARG) | Morocco (MAR) |
