= Carlos Carranza =

Uruguayan footballer

Personal information
- Date of birth: 30 November 1928
- Position: Midfielder

International career
Years	Team	Apps	(Gls)
1953–1957	Uruguay	20	(1)
Medal record
Representing Uruguay
Copa América
Winner	1956 Uruguay

Carlos Carranza (born 30 November 1928) was a Uruguayan footballer who played as a midfielder. He played in 20 matches for the Uruguay national football team from 1953 to 1957, scoring once. He was part of Uruguay's squad that won the 1956 South American Championship.
