= Iván Figueroa =

Iván Figueroa (b. 1974) is a poet and novelist from Sahuaripa, Sonora, Mexico.

Figueroa has received awards from the Nacional de Poesía Homenaje a San Juan del Río in 2006, the Concurso de Libro Sonorense in 2002 and 2006, the Premio Nacional de Poesía San Román in 2006, the Premio Nacional de Poesía Juegos Trigales del Valle del Yaqui Bartolomé Delgado León in 2005 and the Concurso Estatal de Poesía Alonso Vidal in 1999.

Figueroa's works include La luz a mediodía, Isocronías temporales, Cielo geográfico, Transitorial, Teorías and The American Poems.
