= Football 5-a-side at the 2004 Summer Paralympics =

Football 5-a-side at the XII Paralympic Games
- Paralympic Football 5-a-side
- Venue: Olympic Hockey Centre
- Dates: 18–28 September 2004
- Competitors: 6 teams

Medalists
1st place, gold medalist(s)		Andreonni Fabrizius; Fábio Vasconcelos; Sandro Laina; Mizael Oliveira; João Batista Silva; Severino da Silva; Anderson Dias; Nilson Silva; Marcos Felipe; Damião Robson	Brazil
2nd place, silver medalist(s)		Gonzalo Abbas Hachaché; Julio Ramirez; Lucas Rodríguez; Iván Figueroa; Diego Cerega; Silvio Velo; Eduardo Diaz; Antonio Mendoza; Oscar Moreno; Dario Lencina	Argentina
3rd place, bronze medalist(s)		Antonio Martin; Vicente Aguilar; Marcelo Rosado; Gonzalo Largo; Alfredo Cuadrado; Jose Lopez Ramirez; Adolfo Acosta; Carmelo Garrido; Pedro Antonio Garcia Villa; Carlos Alvarez	Spain

Football 5-a-side at the 2004 Summer Paralympics took place at the Olympic Hockey Centre in Athens.

Each team had four blind players and one sighted or visually impaired goalkeeper, with five substitutes allowed. Matches were 25 minutes each way. In the play-off matches, two ten-minute periods of extra time and a penalty shoot-out were added as necessary when the scores were tied. In the final, Brazil beat Argentina 3–2 in a shoot-out.

== Results ==
=== Preliminaries ===
Rank	Competitor	MP	W	D	L	Goals	Points	BRA	ARG	ESP	GRE	FRA	KOR
1	Brazil	5	5	0	0	14:0	15	x	2:0	3:0	1:0	4:0	4:0
2	Argentina	5	4	0	1	10:4	12	0:2	x	2:1	2:1	3:0	3:0
3	Spain	5	2	1	2	6:5	7	0:3	1:2	x	0:0	2:0	3:0
4	Greece	5	1	2	2	6:6	5	0:1	1:2	0:0	x	2:2	3:1
5	France	5	1	1	3	4:12	4	0:4	0:3	0:2	2:2	x	2:1
6	South Korea	5	0	0	5	2:15	0	0:4	0:3	0:3	1:3	1:2	x

=== Final round ===
==== Gold medal match ====
Argentina	0 (2) – 0 (3)	Brazil

==== Bronze medal match ====
Greece	0 – 2	Spain

==== Classification 5/6 ====
France	3 – 1	South Korea

== Team lists ==
Brazil; Andreonni Fabrizius; Fábio Vasconcelos; Sandro Laina; Mizael Oliveira; João Batista Silva; Severino da Silva; Anderson Dias; Nilson Silva; Marcos Felipe; Damião Robson	Argentina; Gonzalo Abbas Hachaché; Julio Ramirez; Lucas Rodríguez; Iván Figueroa; Diego Cerega; Silvio Velo; Eduardo Diaz; Antonio Mendoza; Oscar Moreno; Dario Lencina	Spain; Antonio Martin; Vicente Aguilar; Marcelo Rosado; Gonzalo Largo; Alfredo Cuadrado; Jose Lopez Ramirez; Adolfo Acosta; Carmelo Garrido; Pedro Antonio Garcia Villa; Carlos Alvarez
Greece; Estratios Chatziapostolidis; Dimitris Ampatzis; Argyrios Triantafyllou; Paschalis Ampatzis; Ioannis Papnikolaou; Angelis Aslanoglou; Charalampos Tokatlidis; Dimos Zacharos; Georgios Alikaniotis; Christoforos Katsampalis	France; Cedric Moreau; Bouchaib El Boukhari; Frédéric Villeroux; Marc Bolivard; Odile Gerfaut; Philippe Amaouche; Abderrahim Maya; Sebastien Munos	South Korea; Kim Kyoung Ho; You Myoung Goo; Lee Jin Won; Oh Yong Kyun; Park Meong Su; Yoon Jong Suk; Bae Gwang Yong; Lee Ok Hyeong; Lee Heung Joo; Lee Dae Won

== See also ==
- Football at the 2004 Summer Olympics
