= Adolfo Acosta =

Spanish 5-a-side footballer

Personal information
- Full name: Adolfo Samuel Acosta Rodríguez
- Nationality: Spanish
- Born: 19 May 1981 (age 45) Las Palmas, Canary Islands

Sport
- Country: Spain
- Sport: 5-a-side football
Medal record
5-a-side football
Representing Spain
Paralympic Games
Bronze medal – third place	2004 Athens	Men's team
Bronze medal – third place	2012 London	Men's team

Adolfo Samuel Acosta Rodríguez (Note: In this Spanish name, the first or paternal surname is Acosta and the second or maternal family name is Rodríguez.) (born 19 May 1981), commonly known as Adolfo Acosta, is a Spanish 5-a-side football player. Playing for the Spain national team, he won a pair of bronze medals at the 2004 Summer Paralympics and the 2012 Summer Paralympics. Competing at the 2008 Summer Paralympics, his team finished just out of medal contention in fourth place overall. Outside football, he is on the executive board and is a member of the General Assembly for the Federación Española de Deportes para Ciegos (FEDC).

== Personal ==
Acosta was born 19 May 1981 in Las Palmas, Canary Islands. He is a B1 type sportsperson. He has had problems with his eyesight since birth. In 2012, he was living in Madrid. In 2007, Acosta was one of the finalists for the best sportsperson with a disability in Las Palmas. In November 2013, following the announcement of a partnership between Royal Spanish Football Federation (RFEF) and FEDC, Acosta and another person affiliated with the Spanish 5-a-side team gave away with a football signed by all the members of the national team. In 2013, he was awarded the bronze Real Orden al Mérito Deportivo. In December 2013, he attended an event marking Spanish insurance company Santa Lucía Seguros becoming a sponsor of the Spanish Paralympic Committee, and consequently Plan ADOP which funds high performance Spanish disability sport competitors. He chose to attend the event because he wanted to show support for this type of sponsorship.

Acosta is on the executive board and is a member of the General Assembly for the Federación Española de Deportes para Ciegos (FEDC), which is Spain's national governing body for blind sport. He was elected to the executive board in July 2010.

== 5-a-side football ==
Acosta is B1 football player who has repeatedly represented Spain as a member of the national 5-a-side football team. He is affiliated with the DZ Madrid sport federation.

At the 2001 IBSA European Championships, Acosta's team finished first. The following year at the IBSA World Championships in Brazil, his team finished second. He played 5-a-side football at the 2004 Summer Paralympics. His team finished third after they played Greece and, won 2–0. He competed in the 2010 World Championships where he represented Spain. At the 2006 IBSA World Championships, his team finished fourth.

Acosta played 5-a-side football at the 2008 Summer Paralympics. In pool play, his team met China whom they lost to by a score of 1–0. They beat Argentina 2–0. They lost to Brazil 1–0. They beat Great Britain 3–1. His team finished fourth, losing to Argentina in the bronze medal game on penalty kicks. At the 2009 European Championships in France, his team finished fourth. He represented Spain as a member of the 2010 team at the IBSA World Championships in England where his team finished second. In 2011, he represented Spain in the Turkey hosted European Championships. His team was faced Turkey, Russia and Greece in the group stage. The Italian hosted European Championships was played in June 2012, and were the last major competition for him and his team prior to the start of the Paralympic Games. He was coached in the competition by Miguel Ángel Becerra, and participated in daily fitness activities to help with preparations for the Championship and Paralympic Games. On 7 June, he took a medical test to clear participation in the Paralympic Games.

Acosta played 5-a-side football again at the 2012 Summer Paralympics. His team finished third after they played Argentina and, won 1–0. The bronze medal game was watched by Infanta Elena and President of the Spanish Paralympic Committee. In the team's opening game against Great Britain, the game ended in a 1–1 draw. He was a member of the national team in 2013 and competed in the European Championships. The team faced Russia, Greece and France in the group stage. His team won their opener against Russia. His team went on to defeat France and finish first in the competition.
