= Darío Lencina =

Argentine footballer

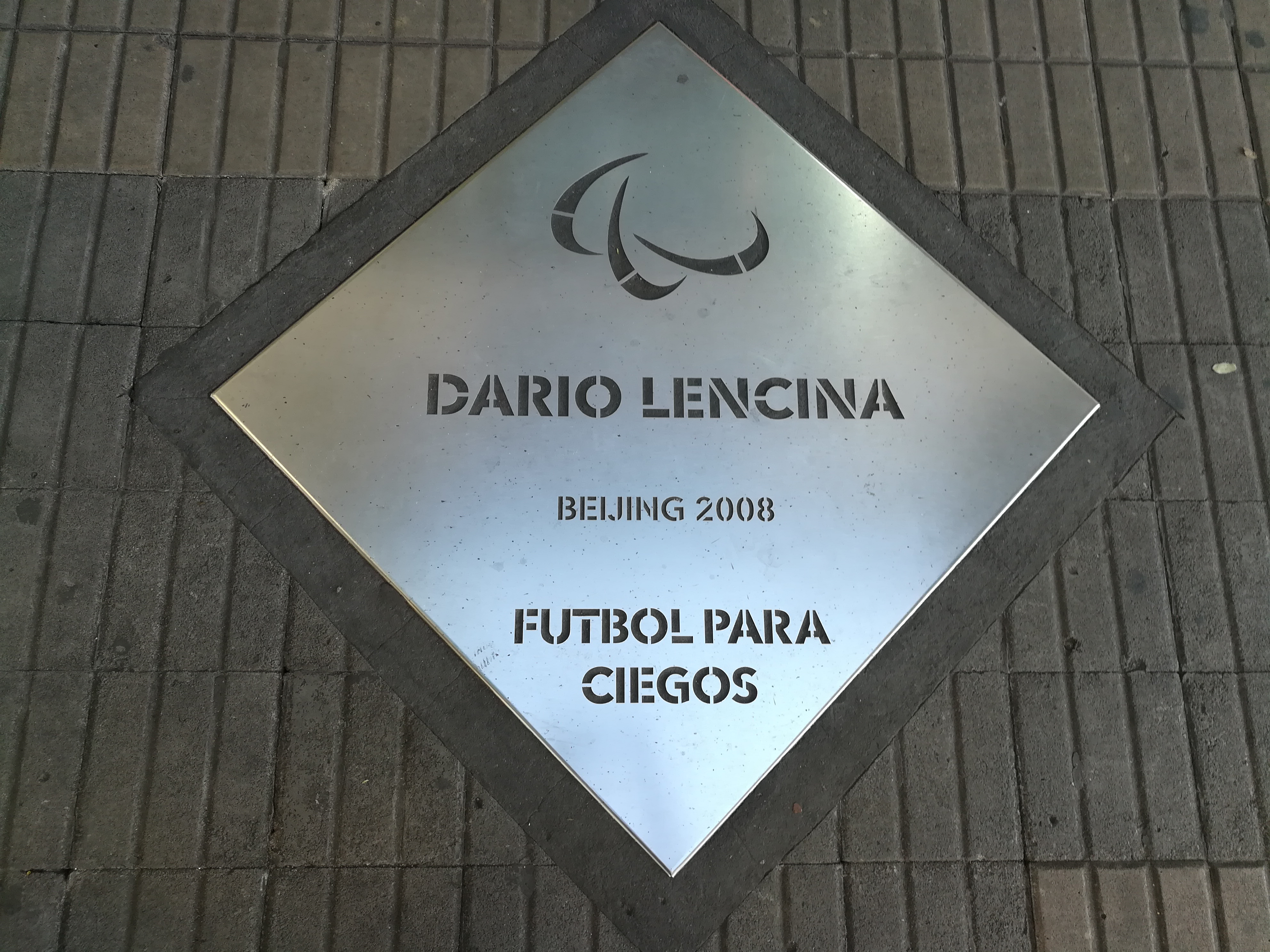

Personal information
- Full name: Dario Aldo Lencina
- Nationality: Argentine
- Born: 23 August 1980 (age 45)

Sport
- Country: Argentina
- Sport: 5-a-side football
Medal record
5-a-side football
Representing Argentina
Paralympic Games
Silver medal – second place	2004 Athens	Men's team
Bronze medal – third place	2008 Beijing	Men's team
Bronze medal – third place	2016 Rio de Janeiro	Men's team
Parapan American Games
Silver medal – second place	2007 Rio de Janeiro	Men's team
Silver medal – second place	2011 Guadalajara	Men's team
Silver medal – second place	2015 Toronto	Men's team

Dario Aldo Lencina (born 23 August 1980) is an Argentine 5-a-side football player and current head coach of the Argentine women's 5-a-side football team. He has represented Argentina 5-a-side football team for over 20 years and has represented Argentina at the Paralympics on four occasions in 2004, 2008, 2012 and 2016. He is also a two time World Championship winner in 2002 and 2006 with the national team.

He currently serves as the technical director of Las Murcielagas and also a member of the Football School of the Argentine Federation of Sports for the Blind.

== Early life ==
Darío Lencina was born in Belén de Escobar, Buenos Aires. He played in the youth divisions of the Villa Dálmine de Campana club. In 1999, he received a casual offer to play football for the blind as a goalkeeper. He made his debut at Escobar's Communications Club and later played for Estudiantes de la Plata. In 2001 he was selected to the Argentine team and made his international debut at the 2001 Copa América which was held in Campinhas, Brazil.

== Career ==
He was a key member of the team which won the 2002 IBSA Men's Blind Football World Championships and 2006 IBSA Men's Blind Football World Championships.

He made his debut appearance at the Paralympics representing Argentina at the 2004 Summer Paralympics. He won silver medal at the 2004 Summer Paralympics with Argentina 5-a-side team which emerged as runners-up to Brazil in the final of the men's tournament as Brazil went onto defeat Argentina in penalties to secure gold medal.

He along with fellow Argentine 5-a-side players received prestigious Jorge Newbery award in 2007 for winning two world titles in 2002 and 2006. He was an integral member of Argentina team which defeated Spain in penalty shootout to win the bronze medal match in the men's 5-a-side tournament at the 2008 Summer Paralympics.

In the next Paralympics held in London in 2012, he was part of the Argentina team which lost the bronze medal match against Spain in penalty shootout in the men's 5-a-side competition. He was part of the Argentine team which emerged as runners-up to Brazil at the 2013 Blind Copa América Championships.

He won another bronze medal with the Argentine side where Argentina defeated China in penalty shootout to win the bronze medal match during the 2016 Summer Paralympics in the 5-a-side competition.
