= Antonio Jesús Martín =

Spanish 5-per-team footballer (born 1982)

Antonio Martín
Personal information
- Full name: Antonio Jesús Martín Gaitán
- Nationality: Spanish
- Born: 22 April 1982 (age 44) Málaga, Spain

Sport
- Country: Spain
- Sport: 5-a-side football
Medal record
Men's 5-a-side football
Representing Spain
Paralympic Games
Bronze medal – third place	2004 Athens	Team
Bronze medal – third place	2012 London	Team

Antonio Jesús Martín Gaitán (born 22 April 1982) is a Spanish 5-per-team footballer. He has a vision impairment and is a B1 type sportsperson. He has represented Spain at the 2004 Summer Paralympics, 2008 Summer Paralympics and 2012 Summer Paralympics, picking up a pair of bronze medals in 2004 and 2012.

== Personal ==
Martín was born on April 22, 1982, in Málaga. He is completely blind and is a B1 type sportsperson. He is nicknamed 'El Niño'.

In 2005, Martín attended university and studied business. In 2013, he was awarded the bronze Real Orden al Mérito Deportivo.

== 5-a-side football ==
In 2005, Martín played in the domestic championship where his team finished first. He repeated the performance in 2006. Playing for ONCE Málaga in 2005, his team were runners up in their league.

=== National team ===
At the Portuguese-hosted 1999 European Championships, Martín's Spanish national team finished first. In Spain at the 2000 World Championships, his team finished third . In Brazil at the 2002 World Championships, his team finished second. At the British-hosted 2003 European Championships, his team finished first and he was the competition's leading goal scorer. He played 5-a-side football at the 2004 Summer Paralympics. His team finished third after they played Greece and, won 2–0.

At the Spanish-hosted 2005 European Championships, his team finished first. That year, Martín was named by UEFA as the top player on the continent. At the time, he had 46 total caps for Spain. In 2006 at the Argentine-hosted World Championships, his team finished fourth. In 2007, he competed at the European Championships where his team finished first. That year, he also competed in the World Championships, where his team finished third. He represented Spain at the 2008 Summer Paralympics where his team finished just out of the medals in fourth place. In 2009, he competed at the European Championships where his team finished third. He represented Spain at the 2010 World Championships, where he was the competition's leading scorer. In 2011, he represented Spain in the Turkey-hosted European Championships. His team was faced Turkey, Russia and Greece in the group stage. He played 5-a-side football at the 2012 Summer Paralympics. In the team's opening game against Great Britain, he scored his team's only goal in a 1–1 draw. His team finished third after they played Argentina and, won 1–0. He scored the team's winning goal against Argentina in a shootout. The game was watched by Infanta Elena, Duchess of Lugo and President of the Spanish Paralympic Committee. Martín was a member of the national team in 2013 and competed in the European Championships. The team faced Russia, Greece and France in the group stage. His team won their opener against Russia. His team went on to defeat France and finish first in the competition.
