= Vicente Aguilar Carmona =

Spanish 5-a-side footballer

Personal information
- Nationality: Spanish

Sport
- Country: Spain
- Sport: Five-a-side football
Medal record
Five-a-side football
Representing Spain
Paralympic Games
Bronze medal – third place	2004 Athens	Men's team

Vicente Aguilar Carmona (born 10 April 1970 in Valencia) is a five-a-side football player from Spain. He has a disability: he is blind. He played five-a-side football at the 2004 Summer Paralympics. His team finished third after they played Greece and, won 2–0.

He was a member of the national team in 2013 and competed in the European Championships.
