= Carmelo Garrido Alarcón =

Spanish 5-a-side footballer

Carmelo Garrido
Personal information
- Full name: Carmelo Garrido Alarcón
- Nationality: Spanish
- Born: 12 September 1971 (age 54) Puertollano, Ciudad Real, Spain

Sport
- Country: Spain
- Sport: 5-a-side football
Medal record
Men's 5-a-side football
Representing Spain
Paralympic Games
Bronze medal – third place	2004 Athens	Team

Carmelo Garrido Alarcón (born 12 September 1971 in Puertollano, Ciudad Real) is a 5-a-side football player from Spain. He has a disability: he is blind. He played 5-a-side football at the 2004 Summer Paralympics. His team finished third after they played Greece and, won 2–0.
