= 2010 IBSA World Blind Football Championship =

Tournament details
- Host country: United Kingdom
- Dates: 14 August – 22 August
- Teams: 10
- Venue: Hereford (in 1 host city)

Final positions
- Champions: Brazil (3rd title)
- Runners-up: Spain
- Third place: China
- Fourth place: Great Britain

Tournament statistics
- Matches played: 27

The 2010 IBSA World Blind Football Championship is a blind football tournament and the fifth World Blind Football Championship. The competition was staged in the United Kingdom between 14 August and 22 August 2010, and involved ten teams of visually impaired players from around the world competing to be crowned world champion. It was won for the third time by Brazil, who defeated Spain 2–0 in the final.

== The tournament ==
The championships, which took place at the Royal National College for the Blind in Hereford, was the first to have been held in the United Kingdom. The draw for the 2010 World Blind Football Championship was held on Monday 12 April 2010 at Wembley Stadium in London and overseen by Sir Trevor Brooking, the Football Association's Director of Football Development, and George Cohen, who was part of England's winning team at the 1966 FIFA World Cup.

The tournament got under way on the afternoon of Saturday 14 August with the opening match between England and Spain. Brazil won the tournament after beating Spain 2–0 in the final on 22 August. It was the third occasion on which Brazil have won the competition, and their team's striker, Jefferson Goncalves, was named Player of the tournament for what was described by the Hereford Times as an outstanding performance. Host nation England achieved their best result to date, coming fourth overall, but missing out on a medal after losing 5–1 to Brazil in the semi-final, then to China in the third place play off. Feng Ya Wang of China was named Young player of the tournament, while Antonio Martin of Spain won the Golden Boot. Martin's Spanish team-mate, Alfredo Gonzalez, was voted the best goalkeeper of the tournament. Japan was presented with the Fair Play trophy by Mayor of Hereford, Councillor Anna Toon.

== Results ==
=== Group stage ===
==== Group A ====
England	0 - 1	Spain	14 August
Colombia	0 - 0	Japan	15 August
Spain	2 - 0	Colombia	16 August
England	2 - 1	South Korea	16 August
Spain	1 - 0	South Korea	17 August
England	2 - 0	Japan	17 August
Spain	2 - 0	Japan	18 August
Colombia	3 - 1	South Korea	18 August
Japan	0 - 0	South Korea	19 August
England	1 - 0	Colombia	19 August

==== Group B ====
Argentina	0 - 1	France	15 August
Brazil	2 - 0	China	15 August
France	0 - 1	Brazil	16 August
Argentina	3 - 0	Greece	16 August
France	2 - 0	Greece	17 August
Argentina	0 - 1	China	17 August
France	1 - 1	China	18 August
Brazil	3 - 0	Greece	18 August
China	4 - 1	Greece	19 August
Argentina	0 - 0	Brazil	19 August

=== Knockout stage ===
9th place play-off

South Korea	0 - 1	Greece	21 August	aet (0 - 1 at full-time)

Semi-finals
Semi-final 1

Spain	1 - 0	China	21 August;	aet (1 - 0 at full-time)

Semi-final 2

Brazil	5 - 1	England	21 August	aet (5 - 1 at full-time)

7th place play-off

Japan	0 - 1	Argentina	21 August	aet (0 - 1 at full-time)

5th place play-off

Colombia	0 - 0	France	21 August	aet (0 - 0 at full-time); / France win 1 - 2 on penalties

3rd place play-off

China	1 - 0	England	22 August	aet (1 - 0 at full-time)

Final

Spain	0 - 2	Brazil	22 August	aet (0 - 2 at full-time)

== Positions ==
1. Brazil
2. Spain
3. China
4. Great Britain
5. France
6. Colombia
7. Argentina
8. Japan
9. Greece
10. South Korea
