= Federico Accardi =

Argentine blind footballer (born 1989)

Personal information
- Born: 26 June 1989 (age 37) Mendoza, Argentina

Sport
- Sport: 5-a-side football
- Club: Godoy Cruz Uniredes
Medal record
Representing Argentina
Paralympic Games
Silver medal – second place	2020 Tokyo	Men's tournament
Bronze medal – third place	2016 Rio de Janeiro	Men's tournament
Parapan American Games
Silver medal – second place	2011 Guadalajara	Men's tournament
Silver medal – second place	2015 Toronto	Men's tournament

Federico Accardi (born 26 June 1989) is an Argentine blind footballer who plays as midfielder and defender for Godoy Cruz Uniredes and also plays for the Murciélagos.

Accardi won Cross of Merit at the Huarpe Awards in 2021 following his team's success at the 2020 Summer Paralympics. As well as the 2020 Summer Paralympics, he has also competed at the 2012 and 2016 Summer Paralympics.
