= Youssef El Haddaqui =

Spanish paralympic footballer

Personal information
- Full name: Youssef El Haddaqui Rabil
- Nationality: Spanish
- Born: 28 December 1988 (age 37)

Sport
- Country: Spain
- Sport: 5-a-side football
Medal record
Men's 5-a-side football
Representing Spain
Paralympic Games
Bronze medal – third place	2012 London	Team

Youssef El Haddaqui Rabil (born 28 December 1988), commonly known as Youssef El Haddaqui, is a 5-a-side football player from Spain. (Note: Alternative spellings of his full name include Youssef El Haddaoui Rabii, Youssef El Haddaoui Rabi, and Jousef el Haddaoui Rabi. Alternative spellings of his common name are Youssef El Haddaoui and Jousef el Haddaoui.)

== Personal ==
He was born on 28 December 1988. He has a disability: he is blind and is a B1 type sportsperson.

From the Catalan region of Spain, he was a recipient a 2012 Plan ADO scholarship.

In 2013, he was awarded the bronze Real Orden al Mérito Deportivo.

== 5-a-side football ==
El Haddaqui is affiliated with the FCEC sport federation. In 2011, he represented Spain in the Turkey hosted European Championships. His team was faced Turkey, Russia and Greece in the group stage. The Italian hosted European Championships was played in June 2012, and were the last major competition for him and his team prior to the start of the Paralympic Games. He was coached in the competition by Miguel Ángel Becerra, and participated in daily fitness activities to help with preparations for the Championship and Paralympic Games. On 7 June he took a medical test to clear participation in the Paralympic Games. He played 5-a-side football at the 2012 Summer Paralympics. His team finished third after they played Argentina and, won 1–0. The bronze medal game was watched by Infanta Elena and President of the Spanish Paralympic Committee. In the team's opening game against Great Britain, the game ended in a 1–1 draw.
