= Germán Muleck =

Argentine footballer (born 1990)

Personal information
- Born: 4 May 1990 (age 36) Buenos Aires, country

Sport
- Sport: 5-a-side football
Medal record
Representing Argentina
Paralympic Games
Silver medal – second place	2020 Tokyo	Men's team
Silver medal – second place	2024 Paris	Men's team
Bronze medal – third place	2016 Rio de Janeiro	Men's team
Parapan American Games
Silver medal – second place	2015 Toronto	Men's team
Silver medal – second place	2019 Lima	Men's team
Bronze medal – third place	2023 Santiago	Men's team

Germán Muleck (born 4 May 1990) is an Argentine footballer who plays as a sighted goalkeeper for the Argentine national blind football team, Los Murciélagos. He is a three-time Paralympic medalist. He is a goalkeeping coach for El Talar de Agronomía FC.
