= Summer Paralympic Games =

International multi-sport event for disabled athletes

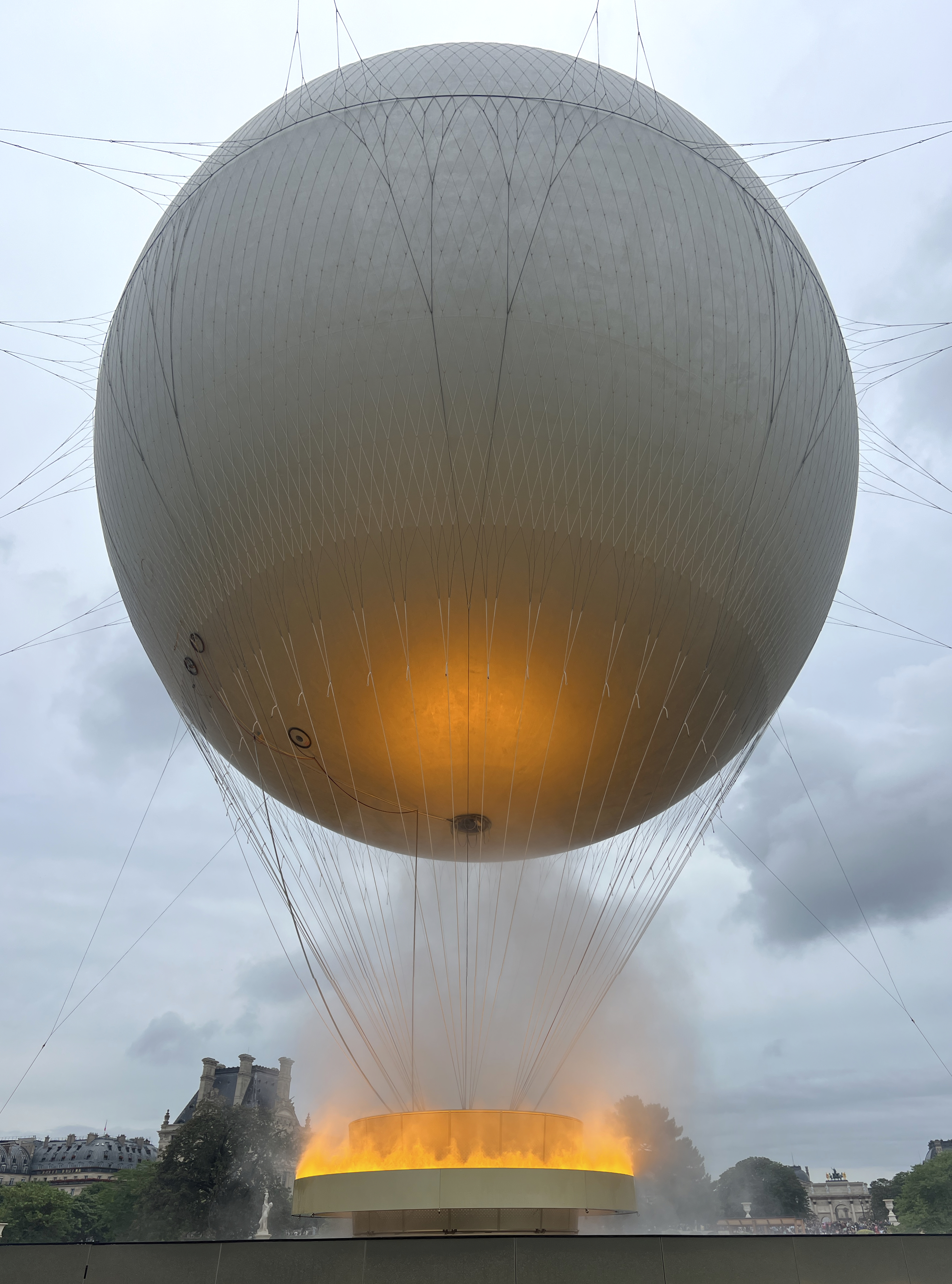
- The Paralympic cauldron in Paris during the 2024 Summer Paralympics.
- 1960; 1964; 1968; 1972; 1976; 1980; 1984; 1988; 1992; 1996; 2000; 2004; 2008; 2012; 2016; 2020; 2024
- Archery; Athletics; Badminton; Boccia; Cycling; Equestrian; Football 5-a-side; Goalball; Judo; Powerlifting; Rowing; Sailing; Shooting; Swimming; Taekwondo; Table tennis; Volleyball; Wheelchair basketball; Wheelchair fencing; Wheelchair rugby; Wheelchair tennis

The Summer Paralympics, also known as the Games of the Paralympiad, are an international multi-sport event where athletes with physical disabilities compete. This includes athletes with mobility disabilities, amputations, blindness, and cerebral palsy. The Paralympic Games are held every four years, organized by the International Paralympic Committee. Medals are awarded in every event, with gold medals for first place, silver for second and bronze for third, a tradition that the Olympic Games started in 1904.

The United States, United Kingdom and Japan have each hosted the Summer Paralympic Games twice. Another eleven countries hosted the summer Paralympics once, this list includes: Australia, Brazil, Canada, China, France, Germany, Greece, Israel, Italy, the Netherlands, South Korea and Spain.

As of the 2024 Summer Paralympics, fourteen countries have competed in every edition of the Summer Games: Argentina, Australia, Austria, Belgium, France, Great Britain, Ireland, Israel, Italy, Japan, the Netherlands, Sweden, Switzerland, and the United States were represented at all Summer Paralympic Games. From this list, 6 achieved gold medals in all editions until 2024: Australia, France, Great Britain, Italy, the Netherlands and the United States.

The United States was the top-ranking (medals) nation for eight Paralympic Summer Games: 1964, 1968, 1976, 1980, 1984, 1988, 1992 and 1996. China was the top-ranking nation for the six most recent Games, 2004, 2008, 2012, 2016, 2020 and 2024. Three other countries managed to achieve this position at least once: Italy (1960), Germany (1972) and Australia (2000).

== Qualification ==
Qualification rules for each of the Paralympic sports are set by the International Federation (IF) that governs that sport's international competition.

== History ==
The first official Paralympic Games was held in Rome, Italy, in 1960. 400 athletes from 23 countries competed at the 1960 Games though only athletes in wheelchairs competed.

At the 1976 Summer Games athletes with different disabilities were included for the first time at a summer Paralympics. With the inclusion of more disability classifications, the 1976 Summer Games expanded to 1,600 athletes from 40 countries.

The 1988 Summer Paralympics were the first to be hosted in the same venues (and thus use the same facilities) as the Olympics of that year. Since then, all Paralympic Games are now held in the same city that hosted the Olympics, with a two-week gap between each.

Rio de Janeiro held the 2016 Summer Paralympics, becoming the first Latin American and South American city to host either the Summer or Winter Games. Tokyo hosted the 2020 Summer Paralympics which made it the first city to host the games twice.

== Functional Classification ==
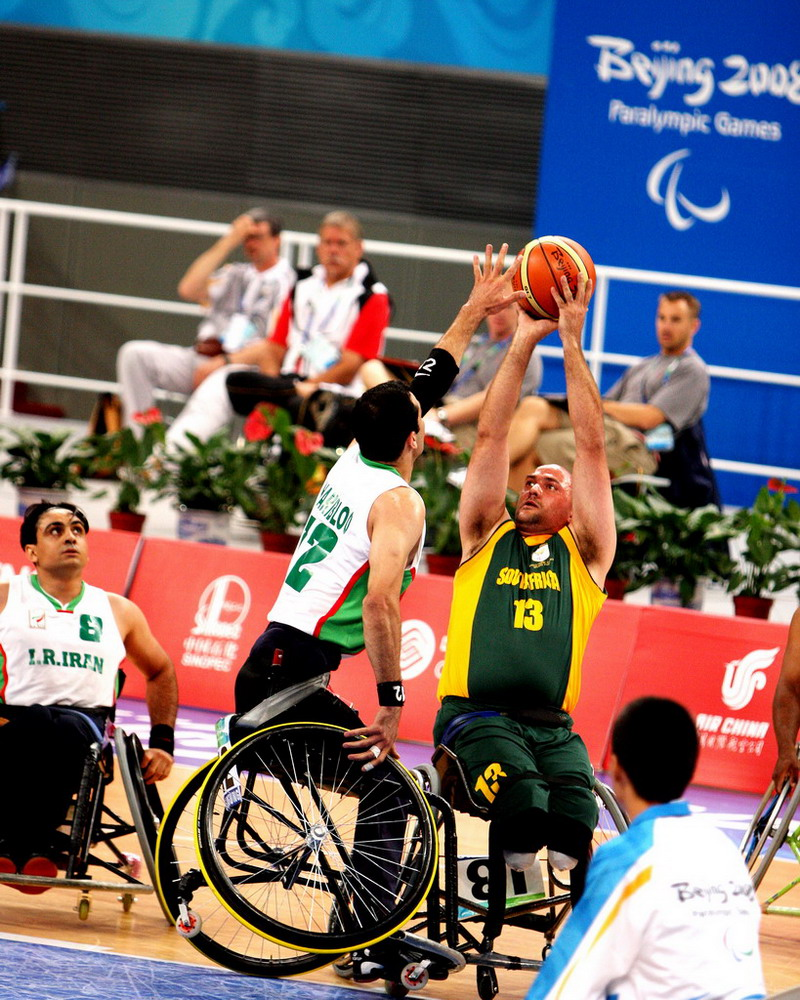
A wheelchair basketball game at the 2008 Summer Paralympics

Every participant at the Paralympics has their disability grouped into one of ten disability categories; impaired muscle power, impaired passive range of movement, limb deficiency, leg length difference, short stature, hypertonia, ataxia, athetosis, vision impairment and intellectual impairment. Each Paralympic sport then has its own classifications, dependent upon the specific physical demands of competition. Events are given a code, made of numbers and letters, describing the type of event and classification of the athletes competing. Some sports, such as athletics, divide athletes by both the category and severity of their disabilities, other sports, for example swimming, group competitors from different categories together, the only separation being based on the severity of the disability. Within the ten disability categories the athletes still need to be divided according to their level of impairment. The classification systems differ from sport to sport and is intended to even the playing field so as to allow as many athletes to participate as possible. Classifications vary in accordance with the different skills required to perform the sport.

=== Archery ===
Archery is open to athletes with a physical disability. Classifications are broken up into three divisions: W1, spinal cord injured and cerebral palsy athletes with impairment in all four limbs. W2, wheelchair users with full arm function. W3, standing amputee, Les Autres and cerebral palsy standing athletes. Some athletes in the standing group will sit on a high stool for support but will still have their feet touching the ground.

=== Athletics ===
Athletics are open to all disability groups and uses a functional classification system. A brief classification guide is as follows: prefixing F for field athletes or T for track athletes. F or T 11–13 are visually impaired, F or T 20 are intellectually disabled, F or T 32–38 are cerebral palsy, F or T 40–46 amputee and Les Autres, T 51–54 wheelchair track athletes and F 51–58 wheelchair field athletes.

=== Boccia ===
Boccia is open to athletes with cerebral palsy or related neurological conditions who compete from a wheelchair. Classifications are split into four groups; BC1: Athletes are either throwers or foot players (with cerebral palsy). Athletes may compete with an assistant BC2: For throwing players (with cerebral palsy). Players may not have an assistant BC3: Athletes (with severe disability) who use an assistive device and may be assisted by a person, but this assistant must keep their back to the court. BC4: For throwing players. Players may not have an assistant (non-cerebral palsy).

=== Cycling ===
Cycling is open to amputee, Les Autres, cerebral palsy and visually impaired athletes who compete in the individual road race and track events. Classifications are broken up into divisions 2, 3 and 4. Athletes in division two are the most severely disabled. While athletes in division four are considered to be higher functioning. Visually impaired athletes compete together with no separate classification system. They ride in tandem with a sighted guide. Amputee, spinal cord injury and Les Autres competitors compete within the classification groupings LC1 – for riders with upper limb disabilities, LC2 – for riders with disabilities in one leg but who are able to pedal normally, LC3 – essentially for riders with a handicap in one lower limb who will usually pedal with one leg only, and LC4 for riders with disabilities affecting both legs.

=== Equestrian ===
Equestrian is open to all disability groups, with riders divided into four grades. Grade 1 incorporates severely disabled riders with cerebral palsy, Les Autres and spinal cord injury. Grade 2 incorporates cerebral palsy, Les Autres, spinal cord injury and amputee riders with reasonable balance and abdominal control. Grade 3 is for cerebral palsy, Les Autres, amputee, spinal cord injury and totally blind athletes with good balance, leg movement and coordination. Grade 4 incorporates athletes who have cerebral palsy, Les Autres, amputation(s), spinal cord injury and/or are visually impaired. This last group comprises ambulant athletes with either impaired vision or impaired arm/leg function.

=== Fencing ===
Fencing is open to wheelchair athletes. There are only three classes; class A incorporates those athletes with good balance and recovery and full trunk movement; class B is for those with poor balance and recovery but full use of one or both upper limbs; class C is for athletes with severe physical impairment in all four limbs.

=== Football ===
There are two forms of football that have been played at the Paralympics. The one currently in the Paralympics is blind football, also known as 5-a-side football, which is open to all visually impaired athletes. Since there are different levels of visual impairment, all players except the goalie (who acts as a guide) are required to wear eye shades. The field dimensions are smaller than able-bodied football, there are only five players on the pitch and the ball makes a sound. Otherwise, the rules are exactly the same as able-bodied football. 7-a-side football, which is open to athletes with cerebral palsy was discontinued after 2016. Athletes competing in 7-a-side football are broken down into classes 5, 6, 7 and 8. All classes comprise ambulant athletes; class 5 being the least physically able, progressing through to class 8 who are minimally affected. Teams must include at least one athlete from either class 5 or 6. Furthermore, no more than three players from class 8 are allowed to play at the same time. Other than the fact that the game is played with seven players the rest of the rules and dimensions of the playing field are the same as able-bodied football. In 1984, a 7-a-side wheelchair football tournament was also held.

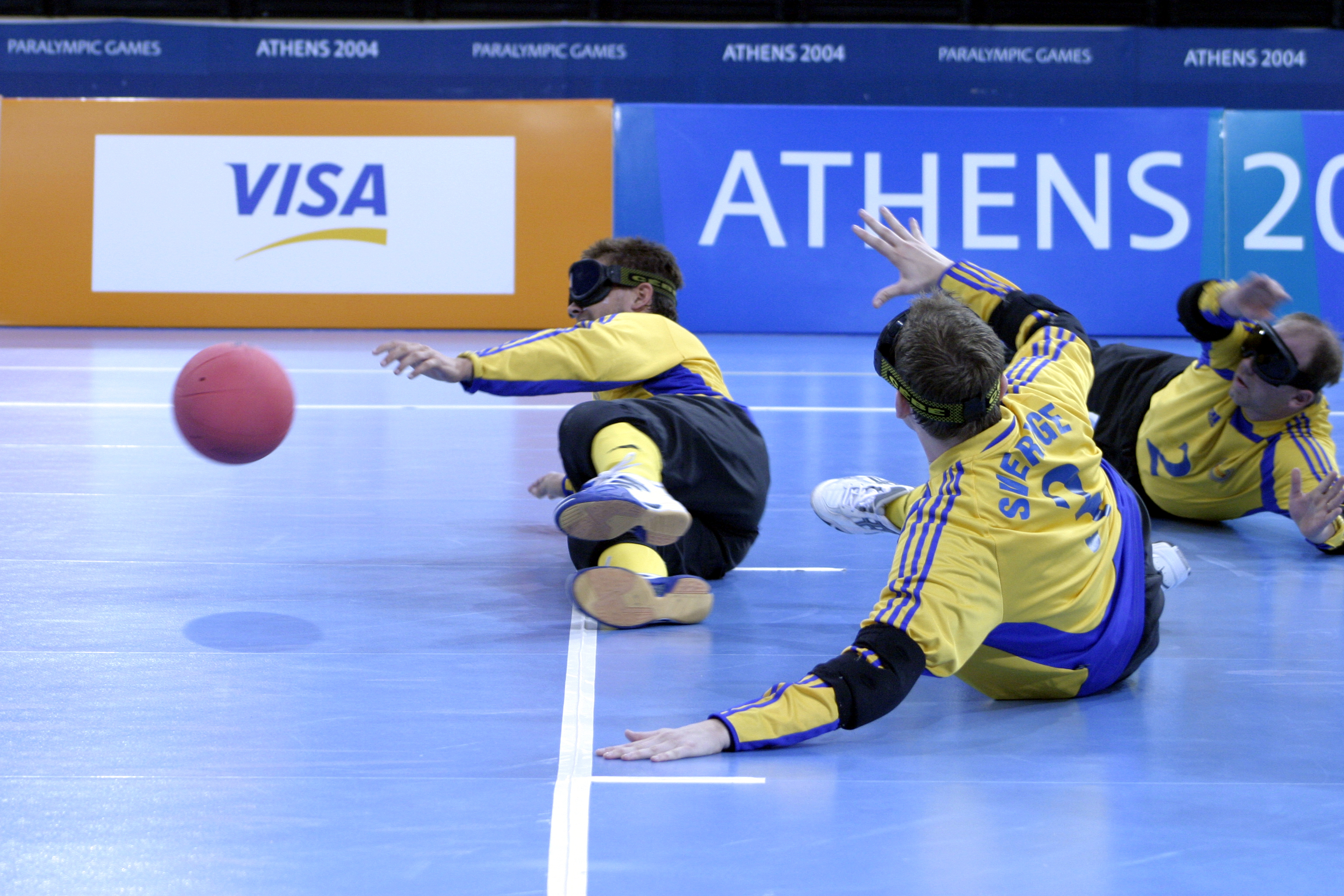
The Swedish goalball team at the 2004 Summer Paralympics

=== Goalball ===
Goalball is open to visually impaired athletes who must wear "black out" masks to ensure all participants can compete equally, thereby eliminating the need for classification. The ball has a bell in it to help the players react to the ball. Complete silence at the venue is required so that the athletes can orient themselves and to ensure fairness.

=== Judo ===
Judo is open to visually impaired athletes. The rules are the same as able-bodied judo except that the players are allowed contact with their opponent prior to the start of the match. There are no classifications; participants are divided into weight categories in the same way as able-bodied judo athletes.

=== Powerlifting ===
Powerlifting is open to athletes with cerebral palsy, spinal cord injuries, amputations (lower limb only), and Les Autres. Since the competition is a test of upper body strength the classifications are by weight category as in able-bodied powerlifting competition.

=== Sailing ===
Sailing was discontinued as a Paralympic sport after 2016. Sailing is open to amputee, cerebral palsy, visually impaired, spinal cord injured and Les Autres athletes. There are three events, one for single, double, and triple-crew boats. Classification for sailing in the three-person event is based on a functional points system with low points for severely disabled athletes rising by scale to high points for less disabled athletes. A classification committee evaluates each sailor and assign a point from one to seven based on their level of ability. Each crew of three is allowed a maximum of 14 points. The single-person event can be crewed regardless of points, but the sailor must have at least a minimum level of disability which prevents them from competing on equal terms with able-bodied sailors. The two-person event is designed for more severely disabled athletes.

=== Shooting ===
Shooting is open to athletes with a physical disability. There are only two classes of competition, wheelchair and standing. There are two types of events, pistol and rifle. The athletes are broken down into classes based on their upper body functionality, balance, muscle strength and limb mobility. The three classes are SH1-competitors do not require a shooting stand, SH2-competitors cannot support the weight of the gun and require a shooting stand, and SH3-Rifle competitors with a visual impairment.

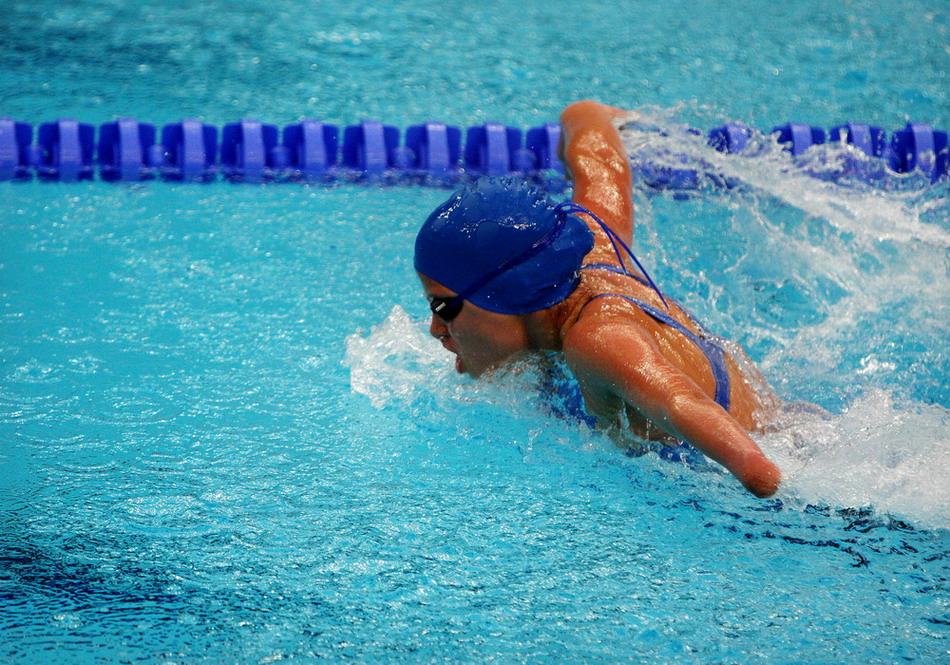
A Paralympian in the women's butterfly at the 2008 Summer Paralympics

=== Swimming ===
The Paralympic swimming competition features all four of the strokes used in able-bodied swimming competitions. Classification is divided into three groups: S1 to S10 are those with physical impairment. S1 will have the most severe impairment and an S10 a lesser impairment. Athletes are judged on their muscle strength, joint range of motion, limb length and movement co-ordination. S11 to S13 are those with a visual impairment. S11 will have little or no vision, S12 can recognise the shape of a hand and have some ability to see, S13 greater vision than the other two classes but less than 20 degrees of vision. S14 is for athletes with an intellectual disability.

=== Table tennis ===
Table tennis is open to athletes with a physical disability. There are individual, doubles, and team events. A match is 5 sets of 11 points each. The athletes are broken down into ten divisions based on their level of function. Classes 1 to 5 are for athletes competing from a wheelchair with class 1 being the most severely disabled and class 5 the least disabled. Classes 6 to 10 encompass ambulant athletes with class 6 the most severely disabled and class 10 the least.

=== Volleyball ===
Volleyball is open to athletes with a physical disability and is performed from a seated position. In sitting volleyball, the court is smaller than the standard court and has a lower net. In the sitting games the only classification rule is that each team may have only one player who fits the minimum disability rule, which is that their disability prevents them from competing on equal terms with able-bodied athletes. The other players on the team must demonstrate a higher level of disability. Standing volleyball was discontinued as a Paralympic event after 2000.

=== Wheelchair basketball ===
Basketball is open to wheelchair athletes. Wheelchair athletes are classified according to their physical ability and are given a point rating between 0.5 – 4.5. The individuals who rate at 0.5 are the most severely disabled and those at 4.5 are the least disabled. A team on the court comprises five players and may not exceed a total of 14 points at any given time.

=== Wheelchair rugby ===
Athletes are classified on a points system similar to wheelchair basketball, with the most severely disabled athlete being graded at 0.5 points rising to 3.5 points. Each team has four players and is allowed a maximum of eight points on the court at any one time.

=== Wheelchair tennis ===
Tennis at the Paralympics is played with all the same rules as able-bodied tennis with the exception that the ball is allowed to bounce twice, and the first bounce must be within the bounds of the court. It is open to athletes with a mobility related disability which means that they cannot compete on equal terms with able-bodied tennis players. The game is played from a wheelchair, with two classes, paraplegic (at least one leg must have a permanent and substantial loss of function) and quadriplegic (at least three limbs must have a permanent and substantial loss of function).

== All-time medal table ==
World map showing nations that have won Summer Paralympic medals, as of completion of the 2024 Summer Paralympics Legend: represents countries that won at least one gold medal. represents countries that won at least one silver medal but no gold medals. represents countries that won at least one bronze medal (no gold or silver). represents participating countries that did not win medals. countries that never participated at the Summer Paralympics

The table below uses official data provided by the International Paralympic Committee.

Defunct nation

status after the 2024 Summer Paralympics

=== Summer Paralympics (1960–2024) ===
Rank	NOC	Gold	Silver	Bronze	Total
1	United States (USA)	844	778	766	2,388
2	Great Britain (GBR)	718	669	661	2,048
3	China (CHN)	629	476	352	1,457
4	Canada (CAN)	410	347	356	1,113
5	Australia (AUS)	407	439	422	1,268
6	France (FRA)	376	390	401	1,167
7	Netherlands (NED)	328	279	257	864
8	West Germany (FRG)*	322	260	246	828
9	Poland (POL)	277	271	228	776
10	Sweden (SWE)	235	234	180	649
11	Spain (ESP)	224	247	256	727
12	Germany (GER)	209	270	278	757
13	Italy (ITA)	191	217	262	670
14	Ukraine (UKR)	171	190	193	554
15	Japan (JPN)	141	150	177	468
16	Brazil (BRA)	135	161	172	468
17	South Korea (KOR)	134	126	135	395
18	Israel (ISR)	133	127	134	394
19	South Africa (RSA)	123	95	92	310
20	Norway (NOR)	117	108	99	324
Totals (20 entries)		6,124	5,834	5,667	17,625

== List of Paralympic sports ==
A number of different sports have been part of the Paralympic program at one point or another.

Current sport No longer included

Sport	Years
Archery	all
Athletics	all
Badminton	since 2020
Basketball ID	2000
Blind football	since 2004
Boccia	since 1984
Canoe	since 2016
Climbing	2028
Cycling	since 1988
Dartchery	1960–1980
Equestrian	since 1996
Fencing	all
Football 7-a-side	1984–2016
Goalball	since 1976
Judo	since 1988
Lawn bowls	1968–1988, 1996

Sport	Years
Powerlifting	since 1984
Rowing	since 2008
Sailing	1996, 2000–2016
Shooting	since 1976
Snooker	1960–1976, 1984–1988
Swimming	all
Table tennis	all
Taekwondo	since 2020
Triathlon	since 2016
Volleyball	since 1976
Weightlifting	1964–1992
Wheelchair basketball	all
Wheelchair rugby	1996, since 2000
Wheelchair tennis	1988, since 1992
Wrestling	1980–1984

== List of Summer Paralympic Games ==
1988 Summer Paralympics was the first time the term Paralympic was used officially. For the first time in history since Tokyo 1964, the same city held the Olympics and Paralympics in 1988. IPC was founded in 1989.

Non-European host cities of Summer Paralympic Games
European host cities of Summer Paralympic Games

Games	Paralympiad	Host	Opened by	Dates	Nations	Competitors			Sports	Events	Top Nation
Games	Paralympiad	Host	Opened by	Dates	Nations	Total	Men	Women	Sports	Events	Top Nation
International Stoke Mandeville Games
1 / 9th International Stoke Mandeville Games	1960	Rome, Italy	Camillo Giardina	18–25 September 1960	23	400			8	114	Italy (ITA)
2 / 13th International Stoke Mandeville Games	1964	Tokyo, Japan	Crown Prince Akihito	3–12 November 1964	21	375	307	68	9	144	United States (USA)
3 / 17th International Stoke Mandeville Games	1968	Tel Aviv, Israel	Yigal Allon	4–13 November 1968	29	750			10	181	United States (USA)
4 / 21st International Stoke Mandeville Games	1972	Heidelberg, West Germany	President Gustav Heinemann	2–11 August 1972	41	1,004			10	187	West Germany (FRG)
Torontolympiad – Olympiad for the Physically Disabled
5	1976	Toronto, Canada	Lieutenant Governor Pauline Mills McGibbon	3–11 August 1976	32	1,657	1,404	253	13	447	United States (USA)
Olympics for the Disabled
6	1980	Arnhem, Netherlands	Princess Margriet	21–30 June 1980	42	1,973			12	489	United States (USA)
International Games for the Disabled
7	1984	New York City, United States	President Ronald Reagan	17–30 June 1984	45	1,800			15	300	United States (USA)
7	1984	Stoke Mandeville, United Kingdom	Charles, Prince of Wales	22 July – 1 August 1984	41	1,100			10	603	Great Britain (GBR)
Summer Paralympics
8 / 1	1988	Seoul, South Korea	President Roh Tae-woo	15–24 October 1988	61	3,057			17	732	United States (USA)
9 / 2	1992	Barcelona, Spain	Queen Sofía of Spain	3–14 September 1992	82	3,020			20	555	United States (USA)
9 / 2	1992	Madrid, Spain	Queen Sofía of Spain	15–22 September 1992	75	1,600			20	555	United States (USA)
10 / 3	1996	Atlanta, United States	Vice President Al Gore	16–25 August 1996	104	3,259	2,469	790	17	508	United States (USA)
11 / 4	2000	Sydney, Australia	Governor-General Sir William Deane	18–29 October 2000	123	3,881	2,891	990	19	551	Australia (AUS)
12 / 5	2004	Athens, Greece	President Konstantinos Stephanopoulos	17–28 September 2004	135	3,806	2,646	1,160	19	518	China (CHN)
13 / 6	2008	Beijing, China	President Hu Jintao	6–17 September 2008	146	3,951			19	472	China (CHN)
14 / 7	2012	London, United Kingdom	Queen Elizabeth II	29 August – 9 September 2012	164	4,302			20	503	China (CHN)
15 / 8	2016	Rio de Janeiro, Brazil	President Michel Temer	7–18 September 2016	160	4,342			22	528	China (CHN)
16 / 9	2020	Tokyo, Japan	Emperor Naruhito	24 August – 5 September 2021^{[a]}	162	4,520			22	539	China (CHN)
17 / 10	2024	Paris, France	President Emmanuel Macron	28 August – 8 September 2024	170	4,463			22	549	China (CHN)
18 / 11	2028	Los Angeles, United States		15–27 August 2028	Future event				23	560	Future event
19 / 12	2032	Brisbane, Australia		24 August – 5 September 2032	Future event						
20 / 13	2036			TBA	Future event						

Italics indicates future events

^{a} Postponed to 24 August to 5 September 2021, due to the COVID-19 pandemic, marking the first time that the Paralympic Games had been postponed. They are still called the 2020 Summer Paralympics, even with the change in scheduling to one year later.

== See also ==
- All-time Paralympic Games medal count
- Cheating at the Paralympic Games
- Winter Paralympic Games
- Multi-sport event
- Summer Olympic Games
