= Froilán Padilla =

Argentine footballer (born 1979)

Personal information
- Born: 2 February 1979 (age 47) Santiago del Estero, Argentina

Sport
- Sport: 5-a-side football
- Club: Godoy Cruz Uniredes
Medal record
Representing Argentina
Paralympic Games
Silver medal – second place	2020 Tokyo	Men's team
Silver medal – second place	2024 Paris	Men's team
Bronze medal – third place	2016 Rio de Janeiro	Men's team
Parapan American Games
Silver medal – second place	2011 Guadalajara	Men's team
Silver medal – second place	2015 Toronto	Men's team
Silver medal – second place	2019 Lima	Men's team
Bronze medal – third place	2023 Santiago	Men's team

Froilán Abdul "Coqui" Padilla (born 2 February 1979) is an Argentine footballer who plays as defender for Los Murciélagos. He is a Paralympic silver medalist at the 2020 Summer Paralympics.

Pádilla experienced sight problems aged eleven, by aged eighteen he completely lost his vision and was diagnosed with retinitis pigmentosa. He was introduced to play blind football in San Isidro, Buenos Aires aged 27, he signed up to the Argentine national blind football team in 2009.
