= Marcelo Rosado =

Spanish footballer (born 1978)

Personal information
- Full name: Marcelo Rosado Carrasco
- Nationality: Spanish
- Born: 2 October 1978 (age 48) Málaga, Spain

Sport
- Country: Spain
- Sport: 5-a-side football
Medal record
Men's 5-a-side football
Representing Spain
Paralympic Games
Bronze medal – third place	2004 Athens	Team
Bronze medal – third place	2012 London	Team

Marcelo Rosado Carrasco (born 2 October 1978 in Málaga) is a 5-a-side football player from Spain. He has a disability: he is blind and is a B1 type sportsperson. He played 5-per-team football at the 2004 Summer Paralympics. His team finished third after they played Greece and, won 2–0. He played 5-per-team football at the 2012 Summer Paralympics. His team finished third after they played Argentina and, won 1-0 in a penalty shoot out. Rosado took one of the penalty shots but missed. The bronze medal game was watched by Infanta Elena and President of the Spanish Paralympic Committee. In the team's opening game against Great Britain, the game ended in a 1–1 draw.

He competed in the 2010 World Championships where he represented Spain. In 2011, he represented Spain in the Turkey hosted European Championships. His team was faced Turkey, Russia and Greece in the group stage.

He was a member of the national team in 2013 and competed in the European Championships. The team faced Russia, Greece and France in the group stage. His team won their opener against Russia. His team went on to defeat France and finish first in the competition.

In 2013, he was awarded the bronze Real Orden al Mérito Deportivo.
