= Morocco at the Paralympics =

- IPC code: MAR
- NPC: Royal Moroccan Federation of Sports for Disabled
- Medals: Gold 19 Silver 17 Bronze 17 Total 53

Summer appearances
- 1988; 1992; 1996; 2000; 2004; 2008; 2012; 2016; 2020; 2024

Morocco made its Paralympic Games début at the 1988 Summer Paralympics in Seoul. It was represented by an all-male team, with five competitors in athletics, three in swimming, and a wheelchair basketball team. Abdeljalal Biare won a bronze medal in the 400m freestyle (category 4) in swimming - Morocco's sole medal of the 1988 Games.

Morocco has participated in every edition of the Summer Paralympics since then, albeit never in the Winter Paralympics. Moroccans have won a total of eleven gold medals (all since 2004), seven silver and eight bronze. Mustapha El Aouzari won gold in the men's 1,500m in athletics in 2004, in the T11 category for totally blind runners. The same year, Abdellah Ez Zine won gold in the men's 800m (T52 category). In 2008, Sanaa Benhama was Morocco's first female Paralympic champion, and the country's most successful Paralympian to date, when she won three gold medals in the 100m, 200m and 400m sprints, in the T13 category for partially sighted athletes. Abdelillah Mame won the country's other gold medal of the Games, in the men's 800m (T13).

Morocco took part in the 2012 Summer Paralympics, with the Royal Moroccan Federation of Sports for Disabled using Bedford as the UK base for its Paralympians.

== Medals ==
=== Medals by Summer Games ===
| Games | Athletes | Gold | Silver | Bronze | Total | Rank |
| 1988 Seoul | 14 | 0 | 0 | 1 | 1 | 48 |
| 1992 Barcelona | 5 | 0 | 0 | 0 | 0 | – |
| 1996 Atlanta | 4 | 0 | 0 | 0 | 0 | – |
| 2000 Sydney | 7 | 0 | 0 | 0 | 0 | – |
| 2004 Athens | 10 | 2 | 4 | 0 | 6 | 42 |
| 2008 Beijing | 18 | 4 | 1 | 2 | 7 | 32 |
| 2012 London | 31 | 3 | 0 | 3 | 6 | 37 |
| 2016 Rio de Janeiro | 26 | 3 | 2 | 2 | 7 | 39 |
| 2020 Tokyo | 37 | 4 | 4 | 3 | 11 | 30 |
| 2024 Paris | 38 | 3 | 6 | 6 | 15 | 31 |
| Total | | 19 | 17 | 17 | 53 | 74 |

=== Medals by Summer sport ===
| Sport | Gold | Silver | Bronze | Total |
|---|---|---|---|---|
| Athletics | 19 | 17 | 12 | 48 |
| Taekwondo | 0 | 0 | 2 | 2 |
| Football 5-a-side | 0 | 0 | 1 | 1 |
| Swimming | 0 | 0 | 1 | 1 |
| Triathlon | 0 | 0 | 1 | 1 |
| Totals (5 entries) | 19 | 17 | 17 | 53 |

== List of medalists ==
| Medal | Name | Games | Sport | Event | Date |
|---|---|---|---|---|---|
| Bronze | Abdeljalal Biare | 1988 Seoul | Swimming | Men's 400 m freestyle 4 | 20 Octobre 1988 |
| Gold | Abdellah Ez Zine | 2004 Athens | Athletics | 800 m T52 | 20 September 2004 |
| Gold | Mustapha El Aouzari | 2004 Athens | Athletics | Men's 1500 m T11 | 21 September 2004 |
| Silver | Abdelghani Gtaib | 2004 Athens | Athletics | Men's 1500 m T46 | 20 September 2004 |
| Silver | Laila El Garaa | 2004 Athens | Athletics | Women's Shot Put F40 | 20 September 2004 |
| Silver | Mohamed Dif | 2004 Athens | Athletics | Men's Long Jump F46 | 20 September 2004 |
| Silver | Mustapha El Aouzari | 2004 Athens | Athletics | Men's 5000 m T11 | 20 September 2004 |
| Gold | Abdelillah Mame | 2008 Beijing | Athletics | Men's 1500 m T13 | 8 September 2008 |
| Gold | Sanaa Benhama | 2008 Beijing | Athletics | Women's 100 m T13 | 8 September 2008 |
| Gold | Sanaa Benhama | 2008 Beijing | Athletics | Women's 200 m T13 | 8 September 2008 |
| Gold | Sanaa Benhama | 2008 Beijing | Athletics | Women's 400 m T13 | 8 September 2008 |
| Silver | Youssef Benibrahim | 2008 Beijing | Athletics | Men's Shot Put F32 | 8 September 2008 |
| Bronze | Najat El Garaa | 2008 Beijing | Athletics | Women's Discus throw F40 | 8 September 2008 |
| Bronze | Laila El Garaa | 2008 Beijing | Athletics | Women's Shot put F40 | 8 September 2008 |
| Gold | Najat El Garaa | 2012 London | Athletics | Women's shot put F40 | 31 August 2012 |
| Gold | El Amin Chentouf | 2012 London | Athletics | Men's 5000 m T12 | 3 September 2012 |
| Gold | Azeddine Nouiri | 2012 London | Athletics | Men's shot put F34 | 3 September 2012 |
| Bronze | Mohamed Amguoun | 2012 London | Athletics | Men's 400 m T13 | 2 September 2012 |
| Bronze | Abdelillah Mame | 2012 London | Athletics | Men's 800 m T13 | 8 September 2012 |
| Bronze | Najat El Garaa | 2012 London | Athletics | Women's Discus F40 | 3 September 2012 |
| Gold | El Amin Chentouf | 2016 Rio de Janeiro | Athletics | Men's marathon - T12 | 11 September 2016 |
| Gold | Mohamed Amguoun | 2016 Rio de Janeiro | Athletics | Men's 400 m T13 | 15 September 2016 |
| Gold | Azeddine Nouiri | 2016 Rio de Janeiro | Athletics | Men's shot put F34 | 15 September 2016 |
| Silver | Mahdi Afri | 2016 Rio de Janeiro | Athletics | Men's 400 m T12 | 9 September 2016 |
| Silver | El Amin Chentouf | 2016 Rio de Janeiro | Athletics | Men's 5000 m T13 | 15 September 2016 |
| Bronze | Mohamed Lahna | 2016 Rio de Janeiro | Paratriathlon | Men's Paratriathlon PT2 | 10 September 2016 |
| Bronze | Mahdi Afri | 2016 Rio de Janeiro | Athletics | Men's 200 m T12 | 17 September 2016 |
| Gold | Abdeslam Hili | 2020 Tokyo | Athletics | Men's 400 metres T12 | 2 September 2021 |
| Gold | Zakariae Derhem | 2020 Tokyo | Athletics | Men's shot put F33 | 4 September 2021 |
| Gold | Ayoub Sadni | 2020 Tokyo | Athletics | Men's 400 metres T47 | 4 September 2021 |
| Gold | El Amin Chentouf | 2020 Tokyo | Athletics | Men's marathon - T12 | 5 September 2021 |
| Silver | Youssra Karim | 2020 Tokyo | Athletics | Women's discus throw F41 | 1 September 2021 |
| Silver | Mohamed Amguoun | 2020 Tokyo | Athletics | Men's 400 metres T13 | 2 September 2021 |
| Silver | Fouzia El Kassioui | 2020 Tokyo | Athletics | Women's shot put F33 | 2 September 2021 |
| Silver | Azeddine Nouiri | 2020 Tokyo | Athletics | Men's shot put F34 | 4 September 2021 |
| Bronze | Saida Amoudi | 2020 Tokyo | Athletics | Women's shot put F54 | 31 August 2021 |
| Bronze | Hayat El Garaa | 2020 Tokyo | Athletics | Women's discus throw F41 | 1 September 2021 |
| Bronze | Morocco men's national football 5-a-side team | 2020 Tokyo | Football 5-a-side | Men's tournament | 4 September 2021 |
| Gold | Mouncef Bouja | 2024 Paris | Athletics | Men's 400m - T12 | 5 September 2024 |
| Gold | Aymane El Haddaoui | 2024 Paris | Athletics | Men's 400m - T47 | 7 September 2024 |
| Gold | Fatima Ezzahra El Idrissi | 2024 Paris | Athletics | Women's Marathon - T12 | 8 September 2024 |
| Silver | Ayoub Sadni | 2024 Paris | Athletics | Men's 400m - T47 | 7 September 2024 |
| Silver | Azeddine Nouiri | 2024 Paris | Athletics | Men's Shot Put - F34 | 7 September 2024 |
| Silver | Abdelillah Gani | 2024 Paris | Athletics | Men's Shot Put - F53 | 1 September 2024 |
| Silver | Fatima Ezzahra El Idrissi | 2024 Paris | Athletics | Women's 1500m - T13 | 31 August 2024 |
| Silver | Meryem En-Nourhi | 2024 Paris | Athletics | Women's Marathon - T12 | 8 September 2024 |
| Silver | Youssra Karim | 2024 Paris | Athletics | Women's Discus Throw - F41 | 4 September 2024 |
| Bronze | Aymane El Haddaoui | 2024 Paris | Athletics | Men's 100m - T47 | 30 August 2024 |
| Bronze | El Amin Chentouf | 2024 Paris | Athletics | Men's Marathon - T12 | 8 September 2024 |
| Bronze | Zakariae Derhem | 2024 Paris | Athletics | Men's Shot Put - F33 | 7 September 2024 |
| Bronze | Saida Amoudi | 2024 Paris | Athletics | Women's Shot Put - F34 | 3 September 2024 |
| Bronze | Ayoub Adouich | 2024 Paris | Taekwondo | Men K44 -63kg | 30 August 2024 |
| Bronze | Rajae Akermach | 2024 Paris | Taekwondo | Women K44 +65kg | 31 August 2024 |

== Athletes with most medals ==
The Moroccan athlete who won the most medals in the history of the Paralympic Games is the Paralympian athlete El Amin Chentouf.

| Athlete | Sport | Games | Gold medal | Silver medal | Bronze medal | Total |
|---|---|---|---|---|---|---|
| El Amin Chentouf | Athletics | 2012–2024 | 3 | 1 | 1 | 5 |
| Sanaa Benhama | Athletics | 2008 | 3 | 0 | 0 | 3 |
| Azeddine Nouiri | Athletics | 2012–2024 | 2 | 2 | 0 | 4 |
| Mohamed Amguoun | Athletics | 2012–2020 | 1 | 1 | 1 | 3 |
| Najat El Garaa | Athletics | 2008–2012 | 1 | 0 | 2 | 3 |
| Mustapha El Aouzari | Athletics | 2004 | 1 | 1 | 0 | 2 |
| Abdelillah Mame | Athletics | 2008–2012 | 1 | 0 | 1 | 2 |
| Laila El Garaa | Athletics | 2004–2008 | 0 | 1 | 1 | 2 |
| Mahdi Afri | Athletics | 2016 | 0 | 1 | 1 | 2 |
| Abdellah Ez Zine | Athletics | 2004 | 1 | 0 | 0 | 1 |
| Abdelghani Gtaib | Athletics | 2004 | 0 | 1 | 0 | 1 |
| Youssef Benibrahim | Athletics | 2008 | 0 | 1 | 0 | 1 |
| Mohamed Dif | Athletics | 2004 | 0 | 1 | 0 | 1 |
| Abdeljalal Biare | Swimming | 1988 | 0 | 0 | 1 | 1 |
| Mohamed Lahna | Triathlon | 2016 | 0 | 0 | 1 | 1 |

== See also ==
- Morocco at the Olympics
