= Morocco at the 2024 Summer Paralympics =

- Flag of Morocco
- IPC code: MAR
- NPC: Royal Moroccan Federation of Sports for Disabled

in Paris, France August 28, 2024 – September 8, 2024
- Competitors: 38 in 5 sports
- Flag bearers: Najwa Awane; Hicham Lamlas
- Medals Ranked 31st: Gold 3 Silver 6 Bronze 6 Total 15

Summer Paralympics appearances (overview)
- 1988; 1992; 1996; 2000; 2004; 2008; 2012; 2016; 2020; 2024

Morocco competed at the 2024 Summer Paralympics in Paris, France, from 28 August to 8 September.

== Medalists ==
Medal	Name	Sport	Event	Date
Gold	Mouncef Bouja	Athletics	Men's 400 metres T12	5 September
Gold	Aymane El Haddaoui	Athletics	Men's 400 metres T47	7 September
Gold	Fatima Ezzahra El Idrissi	Athletics	Women's marathon T12	8 September
Silver	Fatima Ezzahra El Idrissi	Athletics	Women's 1500 metres T13	31 August
Silver	Abdelillah Gani	Athletics	Men's shot put F53	1 September
Silver	Youssra Karim	Athletics	Women's discus throw F41	4 September
Silver	Ayoub Sadni	Athletics	Men's 400 metres T47	7 September
Silver	Azeddine Nouiri	Athletics	Men's shot put F34	7 September
Silver	Meryem En-Nourhi; Guide: Abdelhadi El Harti	Athletics	Women's marathon T12	8 September
Bronze	Aymane El Haddaoui	Athletics	Men's 100 metres T47	30 August
Bronze	Ayoub Adouich	Taekwondo	Men's –63 kg	30 August
Bronze	Rajae Akermach	Taekwondo	Women's +65 kg	31 August
Bronze	Saida Amoudi	Athletics	Women's shot put F34	3 September
Bronze	Zakariae Derhem	Athletics	Men's shot put F33	7 September
Bronze	El Amin Chentouf	Athletics	Men's marathon T12	8 September

== Competitors ==
The following is the list of number of competitors in the Games.

Sport	Men	Women	Total
Athletics	9	8	17
Blind football	10	—N/a	10
Cycling	1	0	1
Powerlifting	0	2	2
Taekwondo	2	2	4
Wheelchair tennis	2	2	4
Total	24	14	38

== Athletics ==
Moroccan track and field athletes achieved quota places for the following events based on their results at the 2023 World Championships, 2024 World Championships, or through high performance allocation, as long as they meet the minimum entry standard (MES).

Key

- Note–Ranks given for track events are within the athlete's heat only
- Q = Qualified for the next round
- q = Qualified for the next round as a fastest loser or, in field events, by position without achieving the qualifying target
- DQ = Disqualified
- PR = Paralympic Record
- AR = Area (or continental) Record
- NR = National Record
- SB = Season's Best
- N/A = Round not applicable for the event
- Bye = Athlete not required to compete in round

Track & road events

Athlete	Event	Heat		Final	
Athlete	Event	Result	Rank	Result	Rank
Abdeslam Hili	Men's 400 metres T12	DSQ		Did not advance	
Mouncef Bouja	Men's 100 metres T12	11.14	4	Did not advance	
Mouncef Bouja	Men's 400 metres T12	48.98	1 Q	48.62	1st place, gold medalist(s)
Aymane El Haddaoui	Men's 400 metres T47	47.15	1 Q	46.65	1st place, gold medalist(s)
Aymane El Haddaoui	Men's 100 m T47	10.69	1 Q	10.78	3rd place, bronze medalist(s)
Ayoub Sadni	Men's 100 m T47	DSQ		Did not advance	
Ayoub Sadni	Men's 400 metres T47	46.98	1 Q	47.16	2nd place, silver medalist(s)
El Amin Chentouf	Men's Marathon T12	—N/a		2:24:35	3rd place, bronze medalist(s)
Fatima Ezzahra El Idrissi	Women's 1500 m T13	—N/a		4:22.98	2nd place, silver medalist(s)
Fatima Ezzahra El Idrissi	Women's Marathon T12	—N/a		2:48:36	1st place, gold medalist(s)
Meryem En-Nourhi	Women's Marathon T12	—N/a		2:58:18	2nd place, silver medalist(s)

Field events

Men

Athlete	Event	Final	
Athlete	Event	Distance	Position
Zakariae Derhem	Shot put F33	11.26	3rd place, bronze medalist(s)
Azedine Nouiri	Shot put F34	11.70 AR	2nd place, silver medalist(s)
Abdelillah Gani	Shot put F53	9.22	2nd place, silver medalist(s)
Azedine Nouiri	Javelin throw F34	30.30	7
Zakariae Ez Zouhri	Javelin throw F64	58.58	6

Women

Athlete	Event	Final	
Athlete	Event	Distance	Position
Fouzia El Kassioui	Shot put F33	7.16 SB	5
Saida Amoudi	Shot put F34	7.80 SB	3rd place, bronze medalist(s)
Oumaima Oubraym	Club throw F32	18.82	11
Youssra Karim	Women's shot put F41	8.77	5
Hayat El Garaa	Women's shot put F41	8.32	7
Youssra Karim	Discus throw F41	36.46	2nd place, silver medalist(s)
Hayat El Garaa	Discus throw F41	29.74	4
Norelhouda El Kaoui	Women's discus throw F55	23.42	5
Fouzia El Kassioui	Women's javelin throw F34	15.98 PR	7
Saida Amoudi	Women's javelin throw F34	14.73	10

== Blind football ==
The Moroccan men's blind football team qualified for the paralympic games after winning the 2022 African Championships held in Bouznika.

Summary

Team	Event	Group Stage				Semifinals	Final / BM	
Team	Event	Opposition Score	Opposition Score	Opposition Score	Rank	Opposition Score	Opposition Score	Rank
Morocco men's	Men's tournament	Argentina; D 0–0	Japan; W 1–0	Colombia; L 0–1	3	—N/a	China; L 0–1	6

Team roster

Coach: Driss El Mountaqi

The following is the Morocco squad in the football 5-a-side tournament of the 2024 Summer Paralympics.

No.	Pos.	Player	Class	Date of birth (age)
1	GK	Samir Bara	Sighted	29 June 1984 (aged 40)
3	DF	Houssam Ghilli	B1	9 September 1993 (aged 30)
4	DF	Said El-Mselek	B1	14 October 2000 (aged 23)
5	DF	Hicham Lamlas	B1	1 September 1991 (aged 32)
6	DF	Elhabib Ait Bajja	B1	24 February 1998 (aged 26)
7	FW	Ayoub Hadimi	B1	31 December 1998 (aged 25)
8	MF	Mohamed El Hamouchi	B1	18 February 2003 (aged 21)
9	FW	Zouhair Snisla	B1	24 January 1999 (aged 25)
10	FW	Abderrazak Hattab	B1	11 July 1991 (aged 33)
12	GK	Khalid Kermadi	Sighted	27 June 1982 (aged 42)

Group stage

Pos	Team	Pld	W	D	L	GF	GA	GD	Pts	Qualification
1	Colombia	3	2	1	0	2	0	+2	7	Semi-finals
2	Argentina	3	1	2	0	1	0	+1	5	Semi-finals
3	Morocco	3	1	1	1	1	1	0	4	Fifth place match
4	Japan	3	0	0	3	0	3	−3	0	Seventh place match

Source: Paris 2024
1 September 2024
13:30

Morocco	0–0	Argentina
	Report

Eiffel Tower Stadium, Paris
Attendance: 8,900
Referee: François Carcouët (France)

2 September 2024
13:30

Japan	0–1	Morocco
	Report	Sasaki 26' (o.g.)

Eiffel Tower Stadium, Paris
Attendance: 8,790
Referee: François Carcouët (France)

3 September 2024
11:30

Colombia	1–0	Morocco
Pérez 25'	Report

Eiffel Tower Stadium, Paris
Attendance: 8,890
Referee: François Carcouët (France)

Fifth place match

5 September 2024
13:00

China	1–0	Morocco
Liu 9'	Report

Eiffel Tower Stadium, Paris
Attendance: 8,979
Referee: Rodolphe-Marc-Pierrick Bonnin (France)

== Cycling ==
Morocco sent one male para-cyclist after finished the top eligible nation's at the 2022 UCI Nation's ranking allocation ranking.

=== Road ===
Men

Athlete	Event	Time	Rank
Haytam El Amraouy	Men's road race C1-3	2:08:15	24
Haytam El Amraouy	Men's time trial C1	23:36.52	8

== Powerlifting ==
Athlete	Event	Attempts (kg)				Result (kg)	Rank
Athlete	Event	1	2	3	4	Result (kg)	Rank
Wafae El Azzab	Women's 45 kg	120	~~105~~	~~105~~	—N/a	100	5
Najat El Garraa	Women's 61 kg	100	~~123~~	124	—N/a	124	4

== Taekwondo ==
Morocco entered three athletes to compete at the Paralympics competition. Ayoub Adouich, Rachid Ismaili, and Rajae Akermach, qualified for Paris 2024, following the triumph of their gold medal results in their respective classes, through the 2024 African Qualification Tournament in Dakar, Senegal.

Athlete	Event	First round	Quarterfinals	Semifinals	Repechage 1	Repechage 2	Final / BM	
Athlete	Event	Opposition Result	Opposition Result	Opposition Result	Opposition Result	Opposition Result	Opposition Result	Rank
Ayoub Adouich	Men's –63 kg	Tokhirov (UZB); W 17–15	Bossolo (ITA); L 4-17	—N/a		Encarnacion (DOM); W 19–13	Torquato (BRA); WWD	3rd place, bronze medalist(s)
Rachid Ismaili	Men's –80 kg	Dombayev (KAZ); L 7-12	Did not advance					
Naoual Laarif	Women's –47 kg	Chachibaia (GEO); W 12–11	Romero (MEX); W DSQ	Espinoza (PER); L Withdraw	—N/a		Khudadadi (RPT); L Withdraw	5
Rajae Akermach	Women's +65 kg	Wongsuwan (THA); W 28–4	Truesdale (GBR); L 9–30	—N/a		Rasic (SRB); W 12–0	Menezes (BRA); W 24–15	3rd place, bronze medalist(s)

== Wheelchair tennis ==
Morocco entered one player into the Paralympics by virtue of the gold medal results at the 2023 African Para Games in Accra, Ghana.

Athlete	Event	Round of 64	Round of 32	Round of 16	Quarterfinals	Semifinals	Final / BM
Athlete	Event	Opposition Result	Opposition Result	Opposition Result	Opposition Result	Opposition Result	Opposition Result
Lhaj Boukartacha	Men's singles	Ding (CHN); L 1-6, 6-2, 4-6	Did not advance				
Said Himam	Men's singles	Ward (GBR); L 3-6, 6-7	Did not advance				
Lhaj Boukartacha; Said Himam	Men's doubles	—N/a	Bartram / Ward (GBR); L 3-6, 6-3, 5-10	Did not advance			
Najwa Awane	Women's singles	—N/a	Zikri (ISR); L 3-6, 2-6	Did not advance			
Samira Benichi	Women's singles	—N/a	Chasteau (FRA); L 0-6, 1-6	Did not advance			
Najwa Awane; Samira Benichi	Women's doubles	—N/a		Guo / Wang (CHN); L 1-6,1-6	Did not advance		

== See also ==
- Morocco at the 2024 Summer Olympics
- Morocco at the Paralympics
