= Morocco at the 2020 Summer Paralympics =

- Flag of Morocco
- IPC code: MAR
- NPC: Royal Moroccan Federation of Sports for Disabled

in Tokyo August 25, 2021 – September 6, 2021
- Competitors: 37 in 6 sports
- Medals: Gold 4 Silver 4 Bronze 3 Total 11

Summer Paralympics appearances (overview)
- 1988; 1992; 1996; 2000; 2004; 2008; 2012; 2016; 2020; 2024

Morocco competed in the 2020 Summer Paralympics in Tokyo, Japan from 25 August to 6 September 2021. Morocco hosted the first African Para Games in January 2020 which acted as a games qualifier in some sports.

== Medalists ==
| Medal | Name | Sport | Event | Date |
|---|---|---|---|---|
| Gold | Abdeslam Hili | Athletics | Men's 400 metres T12 | 2 September |
| Gold | Zakariae Derhem | Athletics | Men's shot put F33 | 4 September |
| Gold | Ayoub Sadni | Athletics | Men's 400 metres T47 | 4 September |
| Gold | El Amin Chentouf | Athletics | Men's marathon - T12 | 5 September |
| Silver | Youssra Karim | Athletics | Women's discus throw F41 | 1 September |
| Silver | Mohamed Amguoun | Athletics | Men's 400 metres T13 | 2 September |
| Silver | Fouzia El Kassioui | Athletics | Women's shot put F33 | 2 September |
| Silver | Azeddine Nouiri | Athletics | Men's shot put F34 | 4 September |
| Bronze | Saida Amoudi | Athletics | Women's shot put F54 | 31 August |
| Bronze | Hayat El Garaa | Athletics | Women's discus throw F41 | 1 September |
| Bronze | Morocco men's national football 5-a-side team: Samir Bara; Houssam Ghilli; Imad Berka; Elhabib Ait Bajja; Zouhair Snisla; Kamal Boughlam; Said El-Mselek; Ayoub Hadimi; Abderrazak Hattab; Abdellali Ait Al Hakem | Football 5-a-side | Men's tournament | 4 September |

=== Medals by sport ===
Medals by sport
| Sport | Gold medal | Silver medal | Bronze medal | Total |
| Athletics | 4 | 4 | 2 | 10 |
| Football 5-a-side | 0 | 0 | 1 | 1 |
| Total | 4 | 4 | 3 | 11 |

=== Medals by date ===
Medals by date
| Day | Date | Gold medal | Silver medal | Bronze medal | Total |
| 1 | 25 Aug | 0 | 0 | 0 | 0 |
| 2 | 26 Aug | 0 | 0 | 0 | 0 |
| 3 | 27 Aug | 0 | 0 | 0 | 0 |
| 4 | 28 Aug | 0 | 0 | 0 | 0 |
| 5 | 29 Aug | 0 | 0 | 0 | 0 |
| 6 | 30 Aug | 0 | 0 | 0 | 0 |
| 7 | 31 Aug | 0 | 0 | 1 | 1 |
| 8 | 1 Sept | 0 | 1 | 1 | 2 |
| 9 | 2 Sept | 1 | 2 | 0 | 3 |
| 10 | 3 Sept | 0 | 0 | 0 | 0 |
| 11 | 4 Sept | 2 | 1 | 1 | 4 |
| 12 | 5 Sept | 1 | 0 | 0 | 1 |
| Total | | 4 | 4 | 3 | 11 |

=== Medals by gender ===
Medals by gender^{(Comparison graphs)}
| Gender | Gold medal | Silver medal | Bronze medal | Total | Percentage |
| Female | 0 | 2 | 2 | 4 | 36.4% |
| Male | 4 | 2 | 1 | 7 | 63.6% |
| Mixed | 0 | 0 | 0 | 0 | 0.0% |
| Total | 4 | 4 | 3 | 11 | 100% |

== Competitors ==
| Sport | Men | Women | Total |
|---|---|---|---|
| Athletics | 10 | 7 | 18 |
| Football 5-a-side | 10 | 0 | 10 |
| Cycling | 1 | 0 | 1 |
| Powerlifting | 0 | 3 | 3 |
| Taekwondo | 1 | 2 | 3 |
| Tennis | 1 | 1 | 2 |
| Total | 23 | 13 | 36 |

== Athletics ==
Twelve Moroccan athletes have automatically qualified in athletics in the World Para Athletics Marathon Championships

Men's track

| Athlete | Event | Heats | | Final | |
| Athlete | Event | Result | Rank | Result | Rank |
|---|---|---|---|---|---|
| Mahdi Afri | Men's 400m T12 | 48.53 q SB | 2 | 48.93 | 4 |
| El Amin Chentouf | Men's marathon T12 | —N/a | | 2:21:43 GR | 1st place, gold medalist(s) |
| Abdelhadi El Harti | Men's marathon T46 | —N/a | | | DNF |
| Abdeslam Hili | Men's 400m T12 | 48.78 Q SB | 1 | 47.59 WR | 1st place, gold medalist(s) |
| Ayoub Sadni | Men's 400m T47 | 47.82 Q, PB | 1 | 47.38 WR | 1st place, gold medalist(s) |

Women's track

| Athlete | Event | Heats | | Final | |
| Athlete | Event | Result | Rank | Result | Rank |
|---|---|---|---|---|---|
| Meryem An-Nourhi | Women's marathon T12 | —N/a | | | |
| Fatima Ezzahra El Idrissi | Women's 1500m T13 | 4:51.99 SB | 1 | | DNF |

Women's field

| Athlete | Event | Final | | |
| Athlete | Event | Result | Points | Rank |
|---|---|---|---|---|
| Saida Amoudi | Women's shot put F34 | | | |
| Hayat El Garaa | Women's discus throw F41 | | | |
| Fouzia El Kassioui | Women's shot put F33 | | | |
| Youssra Karim | Women's discus throw F41 | | | |
| Youssra Karim | Women's shot put F41 | | | |

== Football 5-a-side ==
| Team | Event | Group stage | | | | Semifinal | Final / BM | |
| Team | Event | Opposition Score | Opposition Score | Opposition Score | Rank | Opposition Score | Opposition Score | Rank |
|---|---|---|---|---|---|---|---|---|
| Morocco men's | Men's tournament | Argentina L 1–2 | Thailand W 2–0 | Spain D 1–1 | 2 | Brazil L 0–1 | China W 4–0 | Bronze medal |

Morocco have qualified after winning the 2019 Africa Regional Championships held in Enugu, Nigeria. The following is the Morocco squad in the football 5-a-side tournament of the 2020 Summer Paralympics.

| No. | Pos. | Player | Class | Date of birth (age) |
|---|---|---|---|---|
| 1 | GK | Samir Bara | Sighted | 30 June 1984 (aged 37) |
| 3 | DF | Houssam Ghilli | B1 | 10 September 1993 (aged 27) |
| 4 | DF | Kamal Boughlam | B1 | 5 December 1999 (aged 21) |
| 5 | DF | Imad Berka | B1 | 30 January 1986 (aged 35) |
| 6 | | Said El-Mselek | B1 | 15 October 1999 (aged 21) |
| 7 | | Ayoub Hadimi | B1 | 1 January 1999 (aged 22) |
| 8 | | Elhabib Ait Bajja | B1 | 6 March 1983 (aged 38) |
| 9 | FW | Zouhair Snisla | B1 | 25 January 1999 (aged 22) |
| 10 | FW | Abderrazak Hattab | B1 | 12 July 1991 (aged 30) |
| 12 | GK | Abdellali Ait Al-Hakem | Sighted | 15 November 1993 (aged 27) |

Group stage

| Pos | Team | Pld | W | D | L | GF | GA | GD | Pts | Qualification |
|---|---|---|---|---|---|---|---|---|---|---|
| 1 | Argentina | 3 | 3 | 0 | 0 | 7 | 1 | +6 | 9 | Semi finals |
| 2 | Morocco | 3 | 1 | 1 | 1 | 4 | 3 | +1 | 4 | Semi finals |
| 3 | Spain | 3 | 1 | 1 | 1 | 2 | 3 | −1 | 4 | 5th–6th place match |
| 4 | Thailand | 3 | 0 | 0 | 3 | 0 | 6 | −6 | 0 | 7th–8th place match |

Source: TOCOG
29 August 2021
16:30

| Argentina | 2–1 | Morocco |
|---|---|---|
| Espinillo 3', 15' | Report | Snisla 9' |

Aomi Urban Sports Park, Tokyo
Referee: Attila Balint (Hungary)

30 August 2021
16:30

| Thailand | 0–2 | Morocco |
|---|---|---|
| | Report | Snisla 6', 20' |

Aomi Urban Sports Park, Tokyo
Referee: Kazuo Takagi (Japan)

31 August 2021
19:30

| Morocco | 1–1 | Spain |
|---|---|---|
| Snisla 18' | Report | Martin 30' |

Aomi Urban Sports Park, Tokyo
Referee: Germinal Lubrano (Argentina)

Semi-finals

2 September 2021
19:30

| Brazil | 1–0 | Morocco |
|---|---|---|
| Berka 28' (o.g.) | Report |

Aomi Urban Sports Park, Tokyo
Referee: François Carcouët (France)

Bronze medal match

4 September 2021
11:30

| China | 0–4 | Morocco |
|---|---|---|
| | Report | Snisla 4', 8', 18', 30' |

Aomi Urban Sports Park, Tokyo
Referee: Lucio Morgado (Brazil)

== Taekwondo ==
Morocco qualified three athletes to compete at the Paralympics competition. Two of them qualified by winning the gold medal at the 2020 African Qualification Tournament in Rabat, while the other qualified by finishing top six in world ranking.

| Athlete | Event | First round | Quarterfinals | Semifinals | Final |
| Athlete | Event | Opposition Result | Opposition Result | Opposition Result | Rank |
|---|---|---|---|---|---|
| Rachid Ismaili Alaoui | Men's +75 kg | | | | |
| Soukaina Es-Sabbar | Women's –49 kg | | | | |
| Fajar Akermach | Women's +58 kg | | | | |

== Tennis ==
Morocco qualified two player entries for wheelchair tennis. Both qualified under the bipartite commission invitation allocation quota.

| Athlete | Event | Round of 64 | Round of 32 | Round of 16 | Quarterfinals | Semifinals | Final / BM | |
| Athlete | Event | Opposition Result | Opposition Result | Opposition Result | Opposition Result | Opposition Result | Opposition Result | Rank |
|---|---|---|---|---|---|---|---|---|
| Lhaj Boukartacha | Men's singles | Medeiros (BRA); W 7–5, 6–1 | Houdet (FRA); L 0–6, 2–6 | Did not advance | | | | |
| Najwa Awane | Women's singles | —N/a | Tanaka (JPN); L 1–6, 2–6 | Did not advance | | | | |

== See also ==
- Morocco at the Paralympics
- Morocco at the 2020 Summer Olympics
