= Morocco at the 2016 Summer Paralympics =

- IPC code: MAR
- NPC: Royal Moroccan Federation of Sports for Disabled

in Rio de Janeiro
- Competitors: 26 in 4 sports
- Flag bearer: Azeddine Nouiri
- Medals Ranked 33rd: Gold 3 Silver 2 Bronze 2 Total 7

Summer Paralympics appearances (overview)
- 1988; 1992; 1996; 2000; 2004; 2008; 2012; 2016; 2020; 2024

Morocco competed at the 2016 Summer Paralympics in Rio de Janeiro, Brazil, from 7 to 18 September 2016.

== Disability classifications ==
Every participant at the Paralympics has their disability grouped into one of five disability categories; amputation, the condition may be congenital or sustained through injury or illness; cerebral palsy; wheelchair athletes, there is often overlap between this and other categories; visual impairment, including blindness; Les autres, any physical disability that does not fall strictly under one of the other categories, for example dwarfism or multiple sclerosis. Each Paralympic sport then has its own classifications, dependent upon the specific physical demands of competition. Events are given a code, made of numbers and letters, describing the type of event and classification of the athletes competing. Some sports, such as athletics, divide athletes by both the category and severity of their disabilities, other sports, for example swimming, group competitors from different categories together, the only separation being based on the severity of the disability.

== Medalists ==
Morocco's medal haul was more than the total earned by Morocco's 2016 Olympic team who came away with one bronze medal, earned in men's football. They finished thirty third overall on the medal table.

The following Moroccan competitors won medals at the Games. In the 'by discipline' sections below, medalists' names are in bold.

Medal	Name	Sport	Event	Date
Gold	El Amin Chentouf	Athletics	Men's marathon - T13	11 September
Gold	Mohamed Amguoun	Athletics	Men's 400m - T13	15 September
Gold	Azeddine Nouiri	Athletics	Men's shot put - T34	15 September
Silver	Mahdi Afri	Athletics	Men's 400m - T12	9 September
Silver	El Amin Chentouf	Athletics	Men's 5000m - T13	15 September
Bronze	Mahdi Afri	Athletics	Men's 200m - T12	17 September
Bronze	Mohamed Lahna	Paratriathlon	Men's PT2	10 September

== Athletics ==
Men

Track

Athlete	Events	Heat		Semifinal		Final	
Athlete	Events	Time	Rank	Time	Rank	Time	Rank
**Mahdi Afri**	200 m T12	22.69	Q	22.58 **PB**	Q	22.57 **PB**	3rd place, bronze medalist(s)
**Mahdi Afri**	400 m T12	49.32 **PB**	Q	49.34	Q	49.00 **PB**	2nd place, silver medalist(s)
Hafid Aharak	1500 m T37	—N/a				4:20.43 **PB**	4
Mohamed Amguoun	400 m T13	—N/a		48.82	Q	47.15 **WR**	1st place, gold medalist(s)
Youssef Benibrahim	1500 m T13	—N/a				3:56.80	8
Youssef Benibrahim	5000 m T13	—N/a				15:06.53	6
El Amin Chentouf	5000 m T13	—N/a				14:21.04 **PB**	2nd place, silver medalist(s)
El Amin Chentouf	Marathon T13	—N/a				2:32:17 **SB**	1st place, gold medalist(s)
Abdelhadi El Harti	Marathon T46	—N/a				**DNF**	
Abdelillah Mame	1500 m T13	—N/a				4:08.93	13

Field

Athlete	Events	Result	Rank
**Azeddine Nouiri**	Shot put F34	11.28 **RR**	1st place, gold medalist(s)
**Azeddine Nouiri**	Javelin throw F34	27.70	7
**Youssef Ouaddali**	Shot Put F32	7.56	8

Women

Track

Athlete	Events	Heat		Semifinal		Final	
Athlete	Events	Time	Rank	Time	Rank	Time	Rank
**Sanaa Benhama**	100 m T13	12.53	q	—N/a		12.49	7
**Sanaa Benhama**	400 m T13	—N/a				58.40 **SB**	5

Field

Athlete	Events	Result	Rank
Saida Amoudi	Shot put F34	7.52	4
Saida Amoudi	Javelin throw F34	14.24	8
Youssra Karim	Shot Put F41	8.16	4
Hasnaa Moubal	Shot put F40	6.16	7
Hasnaa Moubal	Discus throw F40	17.10	12
Hayat el Garaa	Shot put F41	6.97	7
Hayat el Garaa	Discus throw F41	25.72 **PB**	5

== 5-a-side football ==
Morocco qualified for the Paralympics after finishing second at the 2015 IBSA Blind Football African Championships in Douala, Cameroon. In the first round of group play, Morocco beat Egypt 3 - 0. The second round saw Morocco beat Senegal 3 - 0. This qualified them through first in their group, where they met Mali in the semi-final. They won that game 1 - 0. Morocco then met hosts Cameroon in the final, which Morocco won 2 - 0.

The following is the Morocco squad in the football 5-a-side tournament of the 2016 Summer Paralympics.

No.	Pos.	Player	Class	Date of birth (age)
1	GK	Samir Bara	Sighted	30 June 1984 (aged 32)
3	DF	Othmane Driouch	B1	8 January 1994 (aged 22)
4	DF	Imad Berka	B1	30 January 1986 (aged 30)
5	DF	Hassan El Makkaoui	B1	1 January 1981 (aged 35)
6	MF	Ahmed Elazouzi	B1	1 August 1989 (aged 27)
7	DF	Houssam Ghilli	B1	10 September 1993 (aged 22)
8	FW	Zouhair Snisla	B1	25 January 1999 (aged 17)
9	FW	Abderrazak Hattab	B1	12 July 1991 (aged 25)
10	MF	Mhammed Daoudi	B1	6 March 1983 (aged 33)
12	GK	Ayoub Serrakh	Sighted	17 January 1987 (aged 29)

Pos	Team	Pld	W	D	L	GF	GA	GD	Pts	Qualification
1	Brazil (H)	3	2	1	0	5	1	+4	**7**	Semi finals
2	Iran	3	1	2	0	2	0	+2	**5**	Semi finals
3	Turkey	3	0	2	1	1	3	−2	**2**	5th–6th place match
4	Morocco	3	0	1	2	2	6	−4	**1**	7th–8th place match

Source: Paralympic.org
(H) Hosts
9 September 2016
9:00

Brazil	3–1	Morocco
Ricardinho 31'; Jefinho 36'; Nonato 36'	Report	Hattab 13'

Olympic Tennis Centre, Rio de Janeiro
Attendance: 2,569
Referee: Mariano Travaglino (Argentina)

11 September 2016
9:00

Morocco	0–2	Iran
	Report	Rajabpour 13'; Zadaliasghari 14'

Olympic Tennis Centre, Rio de Janeiro
Attendance: 2,374
Referee: Mariano Travaglino (Argentina)

13 September 2016
16:00

Morocco	1–1	Turkey
Snisla 27'	Report	Öcal 25'

Olympic Tennis Centre, Rio de Janeiro
Attendance: 1,933
Referee: Germi Guimaraes (Brazil)

7th–8th place match

15 September 2016
09:00

Morocco	0–2	Mexico
	Report	Lanzagorta 42'; De la Cruz 49'

Olympic Tennis Centre, Rio de Janeiro
Attendance: 971
Referee: Christian Jung (Germany)

== Paratriathlon ==
Athlete	Event	Swim	Trans 1	Bike	Trans 2	Run	Total time	Rank
Mohamed Lahna	Men's PT2	11:34	1:32	36.55	0.58	21.36	1:12.35	3rd place, bronze medalist(s)

== Powerlifting ==
Athlete	Event	Total lifted	Rank
Naima Elyousri	Women's −67 kg	NMR	

== See also ==
- Morocco at the 2016 Summer Olympics
