= Morocco at the 2008 Summer Paralympics =

- IPC code: MAR
- NPC: Royal Moroccan Federation of Sports for Disabled

in Beijing
- Competitors: 18 in 2 sports
- Flag bearer: Abdelillah Mame
- Medals Ranked 32nd: Gold 4 Silver 1 Bronze 2 Total 7

Summer Paralympics appearances (overview)
- 1988; 1992; 1996; 2000; 2004; 2008; 2012; 2016; 2020; 2024

Morocco competed at the 2008 Summer Paralympics in Beijing, China.

== Medallists ==
Medal	Name	Sport	Event
Gold	Abdelillah Mame	Athletics	Men's 800m T13
Gold	Sanaa Benhama	Athletics	Women's 100m T13
Gold	Sanaa Benhama	Athletics	Women's 200m T13
Gold	Sanaa Benhama	Athletics	Women's 400m T13
Silver	Youssef Benibrahim	Athletics	Men's 5000m T13
Bronze	Najat El Garaa	Athletics	Women's discus throw F40
Bronze	Laila El Garaa	Athletics	Women's shot put F40

== Sports ==
=== Athletics ===
==== Men's track ====
Athlete	Class	Event	Heats		Semifinal		Final	
Athlete	Class	Event	Result	Rank	Result	Rank	Result	Rank
Rachid Ait Mala	T13	400m	52.64	10	did not advance			
Rachid Ait Mala	T13	800m	—				1:55.90	4
Youssef Benibrahim	T13	1500m	4:14.18	10 Q	—		4:08.97	4
Youssef Benibrahim	T13	5000m	15:13.41	2 Q	—		14:50.32 PR	2nd place, silver medalist(s)
Ahmed Ferhat	T46	800m	1:56.77	2 Q	—		2:01.86	8
Fouad Hizraoui	T36	800m	—				2:32.09	9
Abdelillah Mame	T13	400m	49.96	3 Q	—		50.01	4
Abdelillah Mame	T13	800m	—				1:54.78 PR	1st place, gold medalist(s)
Abdelillah Mame	T13	1500m	4:03.57	6 q	—		4:09.12	6
Driss Ouguerd	T46	800m	2:04.51	19	did not advance			
Driss Ouguerd	T46	1500m	4:11.58	15	did not advance			
Said Toumi	T46	1500m	4:09.96	9 q	—		4:08.29	9
Tarik Zalzouli	T13	1500m	4:02.32	5 q	—		4:09.56	7
Tarik Zalzouli	T13	5000m	15:48.84	6 Q	—		DNF	

==== Men's field ====
Athlete	Class	Event	Final		
Athlete	Class	Event	Result	Points	Rank
Ibrahimi Abouchari	F40	Shot put	8.78	-	13
Mohamed El Garaa	F40	Shot put	9.27	-	10

==== Women's track ====
Athlete	Class	Event	Heats		Final	
Athlete	Class	Event	Result	Rank	Result	Rank
Sanaa Benhama	T13	100m	12.38 PR	1 Q	12.28 WR	1st place, gold medalist(s)
Sanaa Benhama	T13	200m	25.37	1 Q	24.89	1st place, gold medalist(s)
Sanaa Benhama	T13	400m	56.17	1 Q	55.56 PR	1st place, gold medalist(s)

==== Women's field ====
Athlete	Class	Event	Final		
Athlete	Class	Event	Result	Points	Rank
Sanaa Benhama	F13	Long jump	5.05	-	7
Laila El Garaa	F40	Discus throw	23.44	-	4
Laila El Garaa	F40	Shot put	8.44 SB	-	3rd place, bronze medalist(s)
Najat El Garaa	F40	Discus throw	26.86	-	3rd place, bronze medalist(s)
Najat El Garaa	F40	Shot put	7.75	-	4
Hasnaa Moubal	F40	Discus throw	17.19	-	9
Hasnaa Moubal	F40	Shot put	5.90	-	9

=== Powerlifting ===
==== Men ====
Athlete	Event	Result	Rank
Abderrahim El Ammari	67.5kg	182.5	6
Said Kalakh	82.5kg	170.0	10

==== Women ====
Athlete	Event	Result	Rank
Khadija Acem	60kg	110.0	4
Malika Matar	40kg	77.5	6

== See also ==
- Morocco at the Paralympics
- Morocco at the 2008 Summer Olympics
