= Morocco at the 2012 Summer Paralympics =

- IPC code: MAR
- NPC: Royal Moroccan Federation of Sports for Disabled

in London
- Competitors: 31 in 4 sports
- Flag bearer: Laila Elgaraa
- Medals Ranked 37th: Gold 3 Silver 0 Bronze 3 Total 6

Summer Paralympics appearances (overview)
- 1988; 1992; 1996; 2000; 2004; 2008; 2012; 2016; 2020; 2024

Morocco competed at the 2012 Summer Paralympics in London, United Kingdom, from 29 August to 9 September 2012.

== Background ==
Sarsah Jolol was quoted by the BBC as saying of the 2012 Paralympics, "There is a stigma in the Arab world when discussing the plight of people with disability. In Morocco there is not the necessary infrastructure to support and accommodate the needs of people with disabilities. On the other hand in Europe, the disabled enjoy a life without discrimination with the forthcoming Paralympic Games being proof."

== Medalists ==
The following Moroccan competitors won medals at the Games.

Medal	Name	Sport	Event	Date
Gold	Najat El Garaa	Athletics	Women's discus F40	31 August
Gold	El Amin Chentouf	Athletics	Men's 5000 m T12	3 September
Gold	Azeddine Nouiri	Athletics	Men's shot put F34	3 September
Bronze	Mohamed Amguoun	Athletics	Men's 400 m T13	2 September
Bronze	Abdelillah Mame	Athletics	Men's 800 m T13	8 September
Bronze	Najat El Garaa	Athletics	Women's shot put F40	3 September

== Athletics ==
Abdelillah Mame won a bronze medal for Morocco in the Men's 800m T13 event on September 6.

== Powerlifting ==
Women

Athlete	Event	Result	Rank
Khadija Acem	67.5 kg	110.0	6
Fatima Bahji	60 kg	90.0	6
Malika Matar	40 kg	76.0	6

== Volleyball ==
=== Men's tournament ===
Roster

The following is the Moroccan roster in the men's volleyball tournament of the 2012 Summer Paralympics.

№	Name	Date of birth	Position	2012 club
	Rachid Benekri	19 September 1974		
2	Abderrahim Aniss	21 December 1976	SE	(Morocco) ASS Sale
3	Hicham El Jamili	11 June 1981		(Morocco) ASWT Temara
4	Khalid Dami	10 May 1975		(Morocco) CMSH Khouribga
5	Abdelghani El Fitir	8 February 1973		(Morocco) CMSH Khouribga
6	Mohammed Qouchairi	21 November 1965		(Morocco) ASS Sale
7	Mohamed Souabi	31 January 1978		(Morocco) AAHS Agadir
8	Youness Zaaboul	8 June 1979		(Morocco) ASWT Temara
9	Hicham Aziani	13 February 1982		(Morocco) ASS Sale
10	Rachid Abdelouafi	12 April 1978	L	(Morocco) ASS Sale
11	Karim Essaadi	21 October 1983		(Morocco) ASS Sale
12	Khalid Chtaibi	8 September 1971		(Morocco) ASWT Temara

Group play

Pos	Team	Pld	W	L	Pts	SW	SL	SR	SPW	SPL	SPR
1	Germany	4	4	0	8	12	3	4.000	340	266	1.278
2	Russia	4	3	1	7	11	5	2.200	356	275	1.295
3	Egypt	4	2	2	6	9	6	1.500	424	402	1.055
4	Great Britain	4	1	3	5	3	9	0.333	230	276	0.833
5	Morocco	4	0	4	4	0	12	0.000	157	300	0.523

30 August 2012; 19:00	Egypt	3–0	Morocco	ExCeL London, London; Referees: Xin Xia (CHN), Masoud Yazdanpanah (IRI)
30 August 2012; 19:00	(25–10, 25–12, 25–22); Report			ExCeL London, London; Referees: Xin Xia (CHN), Masoud Yazdanpanah (IRI)

31 August 2012; 11:00	Germany	3–0	Morocco	ExCeL London, London; Referees: France Marcoux (CAN), Jung Mal-Soon (KOR)
31 August 2012; 11:00	(25–11, 25–10, 25–9); Report			ExCeL London, London; Referees: France Marcoux (CAN), Jung Mal-Soon (KOR)

2 September 2012; 14:00	Great Britain	3–0	Morocco	ExCeL London, London; Referees: Sari Mannersuo (FIN), Stephen Giugni (AUS)
2 September 2012; 14:00	(25–20, 25–19, 25–12); Report			ExCeL London, London; Referees: Sari Mannersuo (FIN), Stephen Giugni (AUS)

4 September 2012; 14:00	Russia	3–0	Morocco	ExCeL London, London; Referees: Adnan Kolos (BIH), Dimosthenis Kostopoulos (GRE)
4 September 2012; 14:00	(25–13, 25–8, 25–11); Report			ExCeL London, London; Referees: Adnan Kolos (BIH), Dimosthenis Kostopoulos (GRE)

9th–10th place classification

7 September 2012; 14:00	Morocco	1–3	Rwanda	ExCeL London, London; Referees: Dee Wauchope (GBR)
7 September 2012; 14:00	(25–20, 25–27, 22–25, 23–25); Report			ExCeL London, London; Referees: Dee Wauchope (GBR)

== Wheelchair tennis ==
Athlete	Event	Round of 64	Round of 32	Round of 16	Quarterfinals	Semifinals	Final	
Athlete	Event	Opposition Result	Opposition Result	Opposition Result	Opposition Result	Opposition Result	Opposition Result	Rank
Lhaj Boukartacha	Men's singles	Bedard (CAN); W 7–5, 6–2	did not advance					
