= Athletics at the 2008 Summer Paralympics – Men's 1500 metres T13 =

The Men's 1,500m T13 had its first round held on September 10, beginning at 21:14 and the Final on September 13 at 20:20.

== Medalists ==
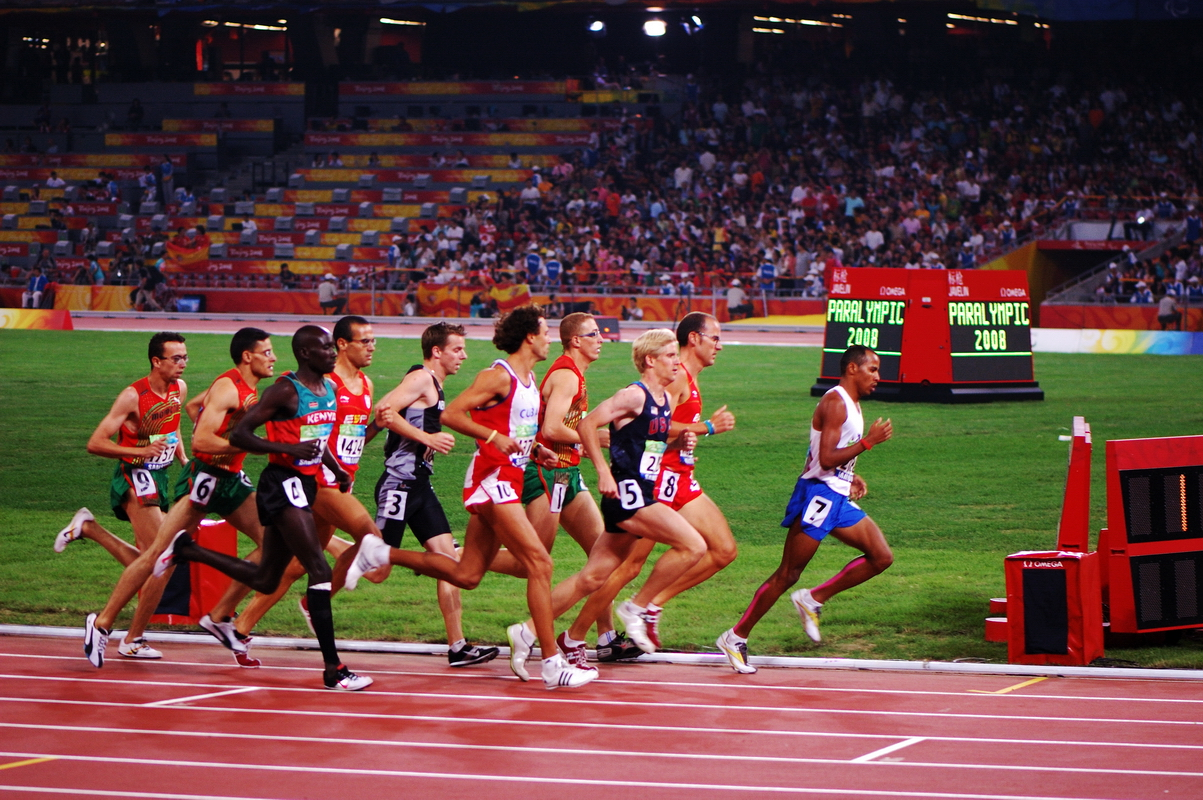
Men's 1500 metres T13 final at the 2008 Summer Paralympics

Gold	Henry Kiprono Kirwa; Kenya
Silver	Lazaro Raschid Aguilar; Cuba
Bronze	Ignacio Avila; Spain

== Results ==
Place	Athlete	Class	Semifinals	Final
1	Henry Kiprono Kirwa (KEN)	T12	4:00.99 Q	4:06.11
2	Lazaro Raschid Aguilar (CUB)	T12	4:01.18 Q	4:06.40
3	Ignacio Avila (ESP)	T12	4:01.90 Q	4:07.00
4	Youssef Benibrahim (MAR)	T13	4:14.18 Q	4:08.97
5	Tim Prendergast (NZL)	T13	4:13.54 Q	4:09.09
6	Abdelillah Mame (MAR)	T13	4:03.57 q	4:09.12
7	Tarik Zalzouli (MAR)	T13	4:02.32 q	4:09.56
8	Abel Avila (ESP)	T12	4:01.49 Q	4:10.22
9	Luis Sanchez (VEN)	T13	4:05.04 q	4:10.44
10	Peter Gottwald Jr (USA)	T13	4:05.51 q	4:16.59
11	Tadashi Horikoshi (JPN)	T12	4:11.36	
12	Yuniesky Abreu (CUB)	T13	4:15.08	
13	Miguel Angel Arroyo (ESP)	T13	4:16.19	
14	Said Gomez (PAN)	T13	4:19.60	
15	Nelson Ned Pereira (BRA)	T13	4:20.09	
16	Lassam Katongo (ZAM)	T12	4:28.80	
17	Gilson Anjos (BRA)	T13	4:29.80	
	Elkin Serna (COL)	T12	DNF	
