= Wheelchair tennis at the 2023 African Para Games =

- Venue: Accra Sports Stadium Tennis Court
- Location: Accra, Ghana
- Dates: 5–10 September 2023
- Nations: 9 (M), 5 (W)

Wheelchair tennis at the 2023 African Para Games in Accra, Ghana took place at the Accra Sports Stadium Tennis Court from 5 to 10 September 2023.

== Medalists ==
Event	Gold	Silver	Bronze
Men's singles	Alwande Sikhosana; South Africa	Leon Els; South Africa	Lhai Boukartacha; Morocco
Men's doubles	South Africa; Alwande Sikhosana; Leon Els	Morocco; Lhai Bokartacha; Said Himam	Egypt; Emad Hassan Salah; Add Elrahman
Women's singles	Najwa Awane; Morocco	Samira Benichi; Morocco	Kafayat Omisore; Nigeria
Women's doubles	Morocco; Najwa Awane; Samira Benichi	Kenya; Phoebe Masika; Jane Nedenga	Nigeria; Kafayat Omisore; Foluke Habibat Smittu

== Medal standings ==
Rank	Nation	Gold	Silver	Bronze	Total
1	Morocco (MAR)	2	2	1	5
2	South Africa (RSA)	2	1	0	3
3	Kenya (KEN)	0	1	0	1
4	Nigeria (NGR)	0	0	2	2
5	Egypt (EGY)	0	0	1	1
Totals (5 entries)		4	4	4	12
