= Athletics at the 2024 Summer Paralympics – Men's 400 metres T47 =

Men's 400 metres T47 at the XVII Paralympic Games
- Venue: Stade de France
- Dates: 6 September 2024 (round 1); 7 September 2024 (final)
- Competitors: 15 from 13 nations
- Winning time: 46.65 WR

Medalists
1st place, gold medalist(s)		Aymane El Haddaoui	Morocco
2nd place, silver medalist(s)		Ayoub Sadni	Morocco
3rd place, bronze medalist(s)		Thomaz Ruan de Moraes	Brazil

400 metres at the 2024 Summer Paralympics
Men · T11 · T12 · T13 · T20 · T36 · T37 · T38 · T47 · T52 · T53 · T54 · T62
Women · T11 · T12 · T13 · T20 · T37 · T38 · T47 · T53 · T54 ·

The men's 400 metres T47 event at the 2024 Summer Paralympics in Paris, took place on 6 and 7 September 2024.

The T47 category is for athletes who have a single below elbow or wrist amputation or similar disability, with normal function in both legs.

== Records ==
Prior to the competition, the existing records were as follows:

T45
World Record	Yohansson Nascimento (BRA)	49.21	(United Kingdom) London	4 September 2012
Paralympic Record	Yohansson Nascimento (BRA)	49.21	(United Kingdom) London	4 September 2012

Area	Time	Athlete	Location	Date
Africa				
America				
Asia				
Europe				
Oceania				

T46/47
World Record	Aymane El Haddaoui (MAR)	46.67	(France) Paris	14 June 2024
Paralympic Record	Ayoub Sadni (MAR)	47.37	(Japan) Tokyo	4 September 2021

Area	Time	Athlete	Location	Date
Africa				
America				
Asia				
Europe				
Oceania				

== Results ==
=== Round 1 ===
First 3 in each heat (Q) and the next 2 fastest (q) advance to the Final.

==== Heat 1 ====
Rank	Lane	Athlete	Nation	Time	Notes
1	8	Aymane El Haddaoui	Morocco	47.15	Q, PR
2	7	Collen Mahlalela	South Africa	48.65	Q, PB
3	4	Dilip Gavit	India	49.54	Q, SB
4	5	Luis Daniel Lopez Morales	Venezuela	49.67	
5	6	Riccardo Bagaini	Italy	49.97	
6	3	Rayven Sample	United States	50.33	
7	9	Lucas de Sousa Lima	Brazil	50.68	

==== Heat 2 ====
Rank	Lane	Athlete	Nation	Time	Notes
1	7	Ayoub Sadni	Morocco	46.98	Q, PR, SB
2	9	Thomaz Ruan de Moraes	Brazil	48.68	Q
3	8	Luis Fernando Lara	Colombia	48.96	Q, PB
4	5	Marufjon Murodulloev	Uzbekistan	49.19	q
5	2	Luis Andres Vasquez Segura	Dominican Republic	49.55	q
6	6	Petrúcio Ferreira	Brazil	50.27	
7	3	Sabino Bembua	Angola	53.30	PB
8	4	Alex Anjos	São Tomé and Príncipe	56.17	SB

=== Final ===
Rank	Lane	Athlete	Nation	Time	Notes
1st place, gold medalist(s)	8	Aymane El Haddaoui	Morocco	46.65	WR
2nd place, silver medalist(s)	6	Ayoub Sadni	Morocco	47.16	
3rd place, bronze medalist(s)	5	Thomaz Ruan de Moraes	Brazil	47.97	SB
4	4	Luis Fernando Lara	Colombia	48.68	PB
5	3	Marufjon Murodulloev	Uzbekistan	48.89	PB
6	2	Luis Andres Vasquez Segura	Dominican Republic	49.07	PB
7	7	Collen Mahlalela	South Africa	49.95	
8	9	Dilip Gavit	India	49.99	
