= Athletics at the 2008 Summer Paralympics – Women's discus throw F40 =

Women's Discus F40 at the XIII Paralympic Games
- Venue: Beijing National Stadium
- Dates: 13 September
- Competitors: 9 from 7 nations
- Winning distance: 28.04

Medalists
1st place, gold medalist(s)		Menggen Jimisu	China
2nd place, silver medalist(s)		Raoua Tlili	Tunisia
3rd place, bronze medalist(s)		Najat El Garaa	Morocco

The women's discus F40 event at the 2008 Summer Paralympics took place at the Beijing National Stadium at 17:30 on 13 September. There was a single round of competition; after the first three throws, only the top eight had 3 further throws. The competition was won by Menggen Jimisu, representing China.

== Results ==
Rank	Athlete	Nationality	1	2	3	4	5	6	Best	Notes
1st place, gold medalist(s)	Menggenjimisu	China	26.93	26.07	27.97	27.74	28.04	x	28.04	WR
2nd place, silver medalist(s)	Raoua Tlili	Tunisia	27.33	17.46	25.43	26.34	27.61	x	27.61	SB
3rd place, bronze medalist(s)	Najat El Garaa	Morocco	24.90	x	26.86	x	25.68	25.47	26.86	
4	Laila El Garaa	Morocco	22.32	23.44	x	22.49	x	x	23.44	
5	Sophie Hancock	Great Britain	20.12	20.31	21.53	21.37	20.82	20.76	21.53	SB
6	Jill Kennedy	United States	20.41	18.98	x	20.71	20.89	20.72	20.89	
7	Petra Hommen	Germany	x	20.29	19.54	19.68	20.18	17.54	20.29	
8	Patricia Marquis	France	x	17.84	x	16.39	17.25	x	17.84	SB
9	Hasnaa Moubal	Morocco	16.30	17.19	14.42	-	-	-	17.19	

WR = World Record. SB = Seasonal Best.
