= Athletics at the 2008 Summer Paralympics – Women's shot put F40 =

Women's Shot Put F40 at the XIII Paralympic Games
- Venue: Beijing National Stadium
- Dates: 15 September
- Competitors: 11 from 8 nations
- Winning distance: 8.95

Medalists
1st place, gold medalist(s)		Raoua Tlili	Tunisia
2nd place, silver medalist(s)		Menggen Jimisu	China
3rd place, bronze medalist(s)		Laila El Garaa	Morocco

The women's shot put F40 event at the 2008 Summer Paralympics took place at the Beijing National Stadium at 18:00 on 15 September. There was a single round of competition; after the first three throws, only the top eight had 3 further throws. The competition was won by Raoua Tlili, representing Tunisia.

== Results ==
Rank	Athlete	Nationality	1	2	3	4	5	6	Best	Notes
1st place, gold medalist(s)	Raoua Tlili	Tunisia	7.91	8.95	8.46	8.56	8.70	-	8.95	WR
2nd place, silver medalist(s)	Menggenjimisu	China	8.11	8.48	8.16	7.96	8.31	8.23	8.48	SB
3rd place, bronze medalist(s)	Laila El Garaa	Morocco	8.19	8.28	8.44	7.67	8.29	8.01	8.44	SB
4	Najat El Garaa	Morocco	6.52	7.75	6.83	7.25	7.51	7.14	7.75	
5	Sophie Hancock	Great Britain	7.24	7.48	7.25	7.39	6.95	7.05	7.48	SB
6	Petra Hommen	Germany	6.35	x	7.28	6.93	6.82	6.95	7.28	SB
7	Kim Minett	Great Britain	6.81	6.76	6.92	6.38	6.40	x	6.92	SB
8	Jill Kennedy	United States	6.39	6.32	6.34	6.20	6.12	6.33	6.39	
9	Hasnaa Moubal	Morocco	5.90	5.89	5.72	-	-	-	5.90	
10	Marika Garefa	Greece	5.39	5.15	5.54	-	-	-	5.54	
11	Patricia Marquis	France	x	4.68	5.51	-	-	-	5.51	

WR = World Record. SB = Seasonal Best.
