= Morocco at the 2004 Summer Paralympics =

- IPC code: MAR
- NPC: Royal Moroccan Federation of Sports for Disabled

in Athens
- Competitors: 10 in 1 sport
- Medals Ranked 42nd: Gold 2 Silver 4 Bronze 0 Total 6

Summer Paralympics appearances (overview)
- 1988; 1992; 1996; 2000; 2004; 2008; 2012; 2016; 2020; 2024

Morocco competed at the 2004 Summer Paralympics in Athens, Greece. The team included 10 athletes, 7 men and 3 women. Six members of the delegation, including three athletes, participated in a study about dental health during the Games.

== Medalists ==
Medal	Name	Sport	Event
Gold	Abdellah Ez Zine	Athletics	Men's 800m T52
Gold	Mustapha El Aouzari	Athletics	Men's 1500m T11
Silver	Abdelghani Gtaib	Athletics	Men's 1500m T46
Silver	Mustapha El Aouzari	Athletics	Men's 5000m T11
Silver	Mohammed Dif	Athletics	Men's long jump F46
Silver	Laila El Garaa	Athletics	Women's shot put F40

== Sports ==
=== Athletics ===
==== Men's track ====
Athlete	Class	Event	Heats		Semifinal		Final	
Athlete	Class	Event	Result	Rank	Result	Rank	Result	Rank
Mustapha El Aouzari	T11	800m	2:01.84	6	did not advance			
Mustapha El Aouzari	T12	1500m	—				4:08.58	1st place, gold medalist(s)
Mustapha El Aouzari	T12	5000m	—				15:33.42	2nd place, silver medalist(s)
Abdeljalil El Atifi	T12	800m	DNS		did not advance			
Abdeljalil El Atifi	T12	5000m	—				DNF	
Abdeljalil El Atifi	T13	1500m	4:04.31	9 Q	—		4:08.91	10
Abdellah Ez Zine	T52	200m	36.14	10	did not advance			
Abdellah Ez Zine	T52	800m	2:05.10 PR	1 Q	—		1:58.68 WR	1st place, gold medalist(s)
Abdelghani Gtaib	T46	800m	DNF		did not advance			
Abdelghani Gtaib	T46	1500m	—				4:01.77	2nd place, silver medalist(s)
Abdelghani Gtaib	T46	5000m	—				15:34.02	8

==== Men's field ====
Athlete	Class	Event	Final		
Athlete	Class	Event	Result	Points	Rank
Mohammed Dif	F46	Long jump	7.07	-	2nd place, silver medalist(s)

==== Women's field ====
Athlete	Class	Event	Final		
Athlete	Class	Event	Result	Points	Rank
Laila El Garaa	F40	Javelin	22.36	-	4
Laila El Garaa	F40	Shot put	6.97	-	2nd place, silver medalist(s)

=== Powerlifting ===
==== Men ====
Athlete	Event	Result	Rank
Ahmed El Khayati	100kg	172.5	11
Said Kalakh	82.5kg	195.0	5

==== Women ====
Athlete	Event	Result	Rank
Malika Matar	40kg	75.0	5

== See also ==
- Morocco at the Paralympics
- Morocco at the 2004 Summer Olympics
