= Athletics at the 2024 Summer Paralympics – Men's 400 metres T12 =

Men's 400 metres T12 at the XVII Paralympic Games
- Venue: Stade de France, Paris, France
- Dates: 4 September 2024 (round 1); 5 September 2024 (final)
- Competitors: 10 from 9 nations
- Winning time: 48.62

Medalists
1st place, gold medalist(s)		Mouncef Bouja	Morocco
2nd place, silver medalist(s)		Noah Malone	United States
3rd place, bronze medalist(s)		Rouay Jebabli	Tunisia

400 metres at the 2024 Summer Paralympics
Men · T11 · T12 · T13 · T20 · T36 · T37 · T38 · T47 · T52 · T53 · T54 · T62
Women · T11 · T12 · T13 · T20 · T37 · T38 · T47 · T53 · T54 ·

The Men's 400 metres T12 at the 2024 Summer Paralympics took place on 4–5 September 2024 at the Stade de France in Paris.

== Records ==
World record	Serkan Yildirim (TUR)	47.47	(Japan) Kobe	23 May 2024
Paralympic record	Abdeslam Hili (MAR)	47.59	(Japan) Tokyo	2 September 2021

Area	Time	Athlete	Location	Date
Africa				
America				
Asia				
Europe				
Oceania				

== Classification ==
The T12 classification is for visually impaired athletes with a LogMAR range from 1.50-2.60, and/or a maximum visual acuity range of 10 degrees. Athletes may choose to run with a guide.

== Results ==
=== Round 1 ===
The Heats took place on 4 September 2024, starting at 12:44 (UTC+2) in the morning session. First in each heat (Q) and the next fastest (q) advance to the final.

==== Heat 1 ====
Rank	Lane	Athlete	Nation	Time	Notes
1	7	Mouncef Bouja	Morocco	48.98	Q
2	5	Kissanapong Tisuwan	Thailand	50.68	SB
3	1	Lassam Katongo	Zambia	58.77	SB
4	3	Yamil Acosta	Colombia	1:23:66	

==== Heat 2 ====
Rank	Lane	Athlete	Nation	Time	Notes
1	3	Rouay Jebabli	Tunisia	48.82	Q
2	7	Oguz Akbulut	Turkey	50.04	q
3	5	Nguyen Khanh Minh Pham	Vietnam	51.28	SB

==== Heat 3 ====
Rank	Lane	Athlete	Nation	Time	Notes
1	7	Noah Malone	United States	48.65	Q, SB
2	3	Marcos Vinicius de Oliveira	Brazil	50.42	
–	5	Abdeslam Hili	Morocco	DQ	TR17.8

Notes: FS= False Start

=== Final ===
The final was held on 5 September 2024, starting at 10:08 (UTC+2) in the morning session.

Rank	Lane	Athlete	Nation	Time	Notes
1st place, gold medalist(s)	7	Mouncef Bouja	Morocco	48.62	
2nd place, silver medalist(s)	3	Noah Malone	United States	49.35	
3rd place, bronze medalist(s)	5	Rouay Jebabli	Tunisia	49.56	
4	1	Oguz Akbulut	Turkey	50.68	
