= 2020 Summer Olympic pictograms =

Symbols of each sport in Tokyo Olympics

The 50 pictogram designs

The 2020 Summer Olympic pictograms are visual graphic symbols used to represent each sport in competition games of the 2020 Summer Olympics.

== Formation ==
The Tokyo 2020 Organising Committee (TOCOG) produced the official sports pictograms of the Tokyo 2020 Olympic Games, due to the need to communicate visually to an increasingly international group of athletes and spectators, while paying great respect to the Olympic sport pictograms, which were first introduced at the 1964 Tokyo Olympic Games.

The designer team led by Masaaki Hiromura was in charge of the creation of the Official "Olympic Games sport pictograms". All rights, including copyrights, regarding the produced the Official Pictograms belong to the TOCOG. After the Olympic and Paralympic Games, it is expected to be under the jurisdiction of the International Olympic Committee (IOC).

== Works ==
The Olympic Games Tokyo 2020 sport pictograms were released on 12 March 2019 (500 days to the originally scheduled opening ceremony), they are designed to subtly communicate the characteristics and athleticism of each sport, as well as artistically highlighting the dynamism of athletes.

Hiromura reveals in a newspaper interview that he needs to go back to the origin of pictograms, "information transmission", and to be simple. So that, for example, for golf, boxing, and other things that can be expressed only by the upper body he does not draw the lower body. On the other hand, he says he pursued realism and activity in simplicity. The evolution of the pictograms to show the dynamics and reality of athletes is, for example, that "I studied body movements and made the torso white in many sports. It is better not to draw the torso. I noticed that the condition of the abdominal muscles and the twist of the waist are easily transmitted."

A total of 50 pictogram designs for the 33 sports of the 2020 Tokyo Olympic were produced (for example, five for the individual disciplines within cycling).

Articles showing the 2020 Olympic pictograms
- Archery
- Artistic Gymnastics, Rhythmic Gymnastics and Trampoline Gymnastics
- Artistic Swimming
- Athletics
- Badminton
- Baseball
- Softball
- Basketball
- Boxing
- Canoeing Slalom and Sprint
- BMX Freestyle, BMX Race, Mountain Bike, Cycling Road and Track
- Diving
- Equestrian Dressage, Eventing, and Jumping
- Fencing
- Football
- Golf
- Handball
- Hockey
- Judo
- Karate Kata and Karate Kumite
- Modern Pentathlon
- Rowing
- Rugby
- Sailing
- Shooting
- Skateboarding
- Sport Climbing
- Surfing
- Swimming
- Table Tennis
- Taekwondo
- Tennis
- Triathlon
- Volleyball
- Water Polo
- Weightlifting
- Wrestling

== Opening ceremony ==
The 2020 Summer Olympics opening ceremony included a video sequence in which a performer represented each in turn of the pictograms. Time Out described it as "a funny, witty performance reminiscent of a typical Japanese TV game show".

== The design of Paralympic pictograms and kinetic sport pictograms ==
The Tokyo 2020 "Paralympic Games sport pictograms" were also handled by Masaaki Hiromura's team, and 23 pictogram designs were produced for the 22 sports of the 2020 Tokyo Paralympics (there were separate pictograms for road cycling and track cycling, within the sport of cycling). Emphasis was placed on expressing a sense of dynamism by studying the rules of the Paralympic Games, how to use the body of para-athletes, and equipment such as wheelchairs for para-athletes.

When both the Olympic Sport Pictograms and the Paralympic Sport Pictograms of Tokyo 2020 are collectively referred to, the name of the Tokyo 2020 Sport Pictograms is often used.

Furthermore, in 2020, "Kinetic Sport Pictograms", which are developments of the sport pictograms based on dynamic concepts such as motion-designed logomark, were unveiled. This work was supervised by video designer Kota Iguchi, and the product could be viewed on the digital signage inside the stadium.

Articles showing the 2020 Paralympic pictograms
- Archery
- Athletics
- Badminton
- Boccia
- Cycling (road and track)
- Equestrian
- Football 5-a-side
- Goalball
- Judo
- Paracanoe
- Paratriathlon
- Powerlifting
- Rowing
- Shooting
- Sitting volleyball
- Swimming
- Table Tennis
- Taekwondo
- Wheelchair basketball
- Wheelchair fencing
- Wheelchair rugby
- Wheelchair tennis
