= Menggenjimisu =

Chinese discus thrower and shot putter

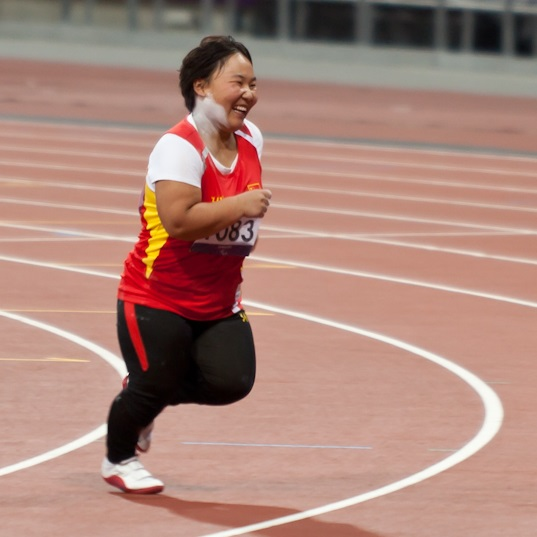
- "Genjimisu Meng" at 2012 Paralympics

Personal information
- Native name: Mönggönjimis (Mongolian script: ᠮᠥᠩᠭᠥᠨᠵᠢᠮᠢᠰ)
- Citizenship: Chinese
- Born: April 8, 1991 (age 35) Ordos, Inner Mongolia

Sport
- Sport: Paralympic athletics
- Event(s): F40 Shot Put and Javelin
- Club: Inner Mongolia province Athletic Team: Hohhot, CHN
- Coached by: Shen Gang
Medal record
Women's para athletics
Representing China
Paralympic Games
Gold medal – first place	2008 Beijing	Discus throw – F40
Silver medal – second place	2008 Beijing	Shot put – F40
Silver medal – second place	2012 London	Shot put – F40
Bronze medal – third place	2012 London	Discus throw – F40
World Championships
Silver medal – second place	2011 Christchurch	Shot put – F40
Bronze medal – third place	2011 Christchurch	Discus – F40

Menggenjimisu (Chinese: 孟根吉米素; pinyin: Mènggēnjímǐsù) or, in Mongolian, Mönggönjimis (Mongolian script: ᠮᠥᠩᠭᠥᠨᠵᠢᠮᠢᠰ, pronunciation: /mɵŋgɵntʃims/ 'silver fruit') is a Paralympian athlete of short stature from China competing in category F40 shot put and discus events. Menggenjimisu won a gold medal at the 2008 Summer Paralympics F40 Discus competing under the name Jimisu Menggen. At the London Paralympics she was billed as Genjimisu Meng.

== Life ==
Menggenjimisu was born in Ordos in Inner Mongolia on 8 April 1991 in a yurt. Her mother abandoned her because she was of small stature and Menggenjimisu was brought up by her grandmother as her father also had a disability. Menggenjimisu's family were poor but they still managed to send her to school. Menggenjimisu did well at her studies and still found time to look after the family's herd in her spare time. Her ability to withstand a hard life drew the attention of Hasilao in 2005. Hasilao, who had won a medal in Atlanta in 1996, and who was planning to compete himself in his fourth Paralympics in Beijing, had set up a training camp for ten athletes in Ordos. Menggenjimisu had to approach her grandparents twice before they consented to let her leave to train. They surrendered to the request because they knew that Menggenjimisu would be fed well, educated and accommodated in her new life.

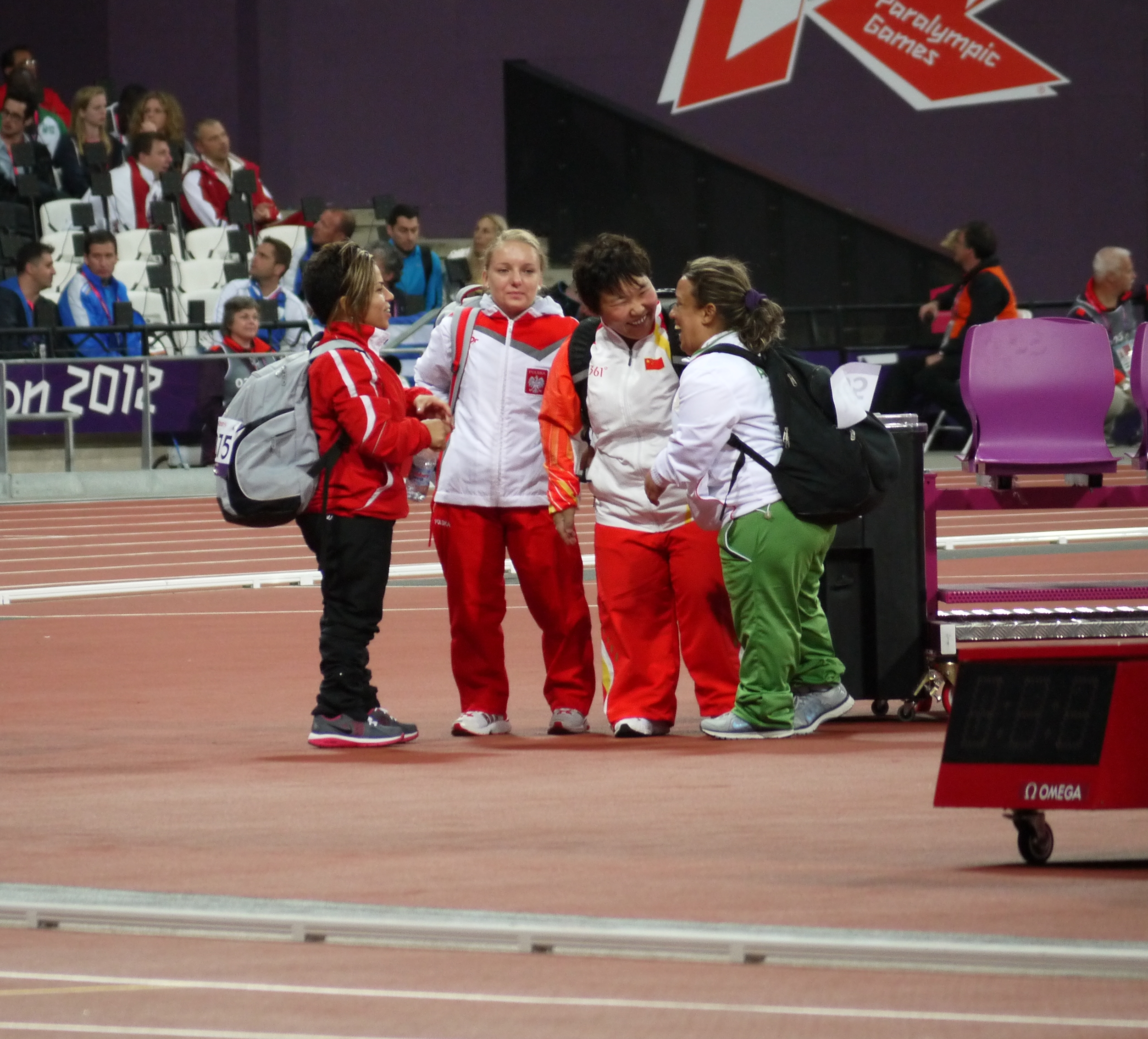
Menggenjimisu with other contestants in 2012

After training with her coach, Shen Gang, Menggenjimisu was chosen to represent China at the 2008 Beijing Paralympic Games after doing well in National competitions. She competed at the Bird's Nest Stadium in Beijing, China in September 2008. There she won a gold medal in the F40 discus and a silver medal in the women's F40 shot put event. She defeated Tunisian Raoua Tlili to capture gold in discus in a performance where both made world record throws. Menggenjimisu made the longest world record throw of 28.04 metres. Menggenjimisu said this was her most memorable achievement.

Menggenjimisu went on to compete in the F40 shot put at the 2008 Paralympics under the name Menggen Jimisu, winning a silver medal after making a throw of 8.48 meters. Menggenjimisu was beaten to the gold by Raoua Tlili on 15 September in a reversal of the earlier positions. Raoua Tlili established a new World Record of 8.95 to beat Menggenjimisu.

In 2010, she competed at the Paralympic World Cup under the name Meng Genjimisu where she was second in the shot put (again to Tlili of Tunisia).

In the 2012 Paralympics in London, Menggenjimisu won a bronze in the discus, beaten into third place by the Tunisian Raoua Tlili and Najat El Garaa of Morocco.

== Honours ==
Apart from Menggenjimisu's medals she has also been honoured with carrying the torch before the 8th National Para Games in Hangzhou in 2011. She has also won the May Day Labour Medal and the 4 May Youth medal.
