= Morocco at the 1992 Summer Paralympics =

Morocco at the 1988 Summer Paralympics
- IPC code: MAR
- NPC: Royal Moroccan Federation of Sports for Disabled

in Seoul
- Competitors: 4
- Medals: Gold 0 Silver 0 Bronze 0 Total 0

Summer Paralympics appearances (overview)
- 1988; 1992; 1996; 2000; 2004; 2008; 2012; 2016; 2020; 2024

4 male athletes from Morocco competed at the 1992 Summer Paralympics in Barcelona, Spain.

== Team ==
Morocco sent four sportsmen to the Barcelona Games. The team included athletics competitors A. Abouzzad, and Mustapha Bouyahya, .

== Athletics ==
A. Abouzzad was scheduled to be in Heat 5 of the Men's 200 m TW4 event, but posted a DNS. He posted a DNF in Heat 2 of the Men's 1,500 m TW3-4 event. Abouzzad also started in the Men's Marathon TW3-4 event, posting a DNF. Bouyahya posted a DNF in the Men's 400 m TW4 event. Competing in heat 2 of the Men's 1,500 m TW3-4 event, Bouyahya posted a time of 4:15.01. He finished twelfth in a thirteen deep field. He also competed in the Men's 5,000 m TW3-4 event. He posted a time of 16:16.01 to finish last in his ten deep heat. His last event was the Men's Marathon TW3-4, where he posted a DNF.

== See also ==
- Morocco at the Paralympics
- Morocco at the 1992 Summer Olympics
