= Morocco at the 1988 Summer Paralympics =

- IPC code: MAR
- NPC: Royal Moroccan Federation of Sports for Disabled

in Seoul
- Competitors: 14
- Medals Ranked 48th: Gold 0 Silver 0 Bronze 1 Total 1

Summer Paralympics appearances (overview)
- 1988; 1992; 1996; 2000; 2004; 2008; 2012; 2016; 2020; 2024

Morocco competed at the 1988 Summer Paralympics in Seoul, South Korea.

== Team ==
Morocco had a 14-member strong delegation in Seoul. The team only included men. Among the athletes on the team were wheelchair basketball players Mohamed Alilou, Khalid Ennadi, Mohamed Fathi, Mesoudi Mourad, Mjid Najmi, and Ali Serghouchni.

== Wheelchair basketball ==
The Moroccan team included Mohamed Alilou, Khalid Ennadi, Mohamed Fathi, Mesoudi Mourad, Mjid Najmi, and Ali Serghouchni. They were coached by Abdelkader Attar. Morocco finished the 1988 Games with an 0 - 4 record. In group play, Morocco lost to Australia 88 - 21. Playing again the same day, they lost to France 90 - 22. The next day, October 17, they lost to Germany 58 - 28. They finished last in Pool B with 4 losses. Morocco was the last African team to play in the men's competition until the 2000 Games, when South Africa made an appearance.

== See also ==
- Morocco at the Paralympics
- Morocco at the 1988 Summer Olympics
