= Athletics at the 2016 Summer Paralympics – Men's 400 metres =

The Men's 400m athletics events for the 2016 Summer Paralympics take place at the Estádio Olímpico João Havelange from September 8 to September 16, 2016. A total of 15 events were contested over this distance for 19 different classifications.

== Schedule ==
R	Round 1	½	Semifinals	F	Final

Event↓/Date →	Thu 8	Fri 9	Sat 10	Sun 11	Mon 12	Tue 13	Wed 14	Thu 15	Fri 16	Sat 17
T11 400 metres							R	F		
T12 400 metres	R	F								
T13 400 metres						R		F		
T20 400 metres	R	F								
T36 400 metres									F	
T37 400 metres								R	F	
T38 400 metres									R	F
T44 400 metres							R	F		
T47 400 metres									R	F
T51 400 metres										F
T52 400 metres					R	F				
T53 400 metres			R	F						
T54 400 metres				R	F					

== Medal summary ==
Classification	Gold		Silver		Bronze	
T11	Gerard Descarrega Puigdevall guide: Blanquino Exposito; Spain	50.22	Felipe Gomes guide: Jonas De Lima Silva; Brazil	50.38 PB	Ananias Shikongo guide: Shimanda Sem; Namibia	50.63 PB
T12	Sun Qichao; China	48.57	Mahdi Afri; Morocco	49.00 PB	Luís Gonçalves; Portugal	49.54 PB
T13	Mohamed Amguoun; Morocco	47.15 WR	Johannes Nambala; Namibia	47.21 PB	Mohamed Fouad Hamoumou; Algeria	48.04 PB
T20	Daniel Martins; Brazil	47.22 WR	Luis Arturo Paiva; Venezuela	47.83 PB	Gracelino Barbosa; Cape Verde	48.55
T36	Paul Blake; Great Britain	54.49 SB	Roman Pavlyk; Ukraine	55.67 SB	William Stedman; New Zealand	55.69
T37	Charl du Toit; South Africa	51.13 PR	Omar Monterola; Venezuela	52.93	Sofiane Hamdi; Algeria	53.01 SB
T38	Dyan Neille Buis; South Africa	49.46 PR	Hu Jianwen; China	50.27	Weiner Javier Diaz Mosquera; Colombia	51.44
T44	Liam Malone; New Zealand	46.20	David Behre; Germany	46.23	Hunter Woodhall; United States	46.70
T47	Ernesto Blanco; Cuba	48.79 PB	Petrúcio Ferreira dos Santos; Brazil	48.87 PB	Gunther Matzinger; Austria	48.95 SB
T51	Peter Genyn; Belgium	1:20.82 PR	Edgar Cesareo Navarro Sanchez; Mexico	1:21.82 SB	Alvise de Vidi; Italy	1:22.38 PB
T52	Raymond Martin; United States	58.42	Tomoki Sato; Japan	58.88	Gianfranco Iannotta; United States	1:02.16
T53	Pongsakorn Paeyo; Thailand	47.91 PB	Brent Lakatos; Canada	48.53	Pierre Fairbank; France	49.00 SB
T54	Kenny van Weeghel; Netherlands	46.65	Liu Yang; China	46.79	Yassine Gharbi; Tunisia	47.07

== Results ==
The following were the results of the finals of each of the Men's 400 metres events in each of the classifications. Further details of each event are available on that event's dedicated page.

=== T11 ===
The T11 category is for athletes with a visual impairment. A T11 athlete may be entirely without sight, or be able to perceive light, but have no ability to see the shape of a hand at any distance. T11 athletes commonly run with guides.

18:49 17 September 2016:

Rank	Lane	Bib	Name	Nationality	Reaction	Time	Notes
1st place, gold medalist(s)	3	1419	Gerard Descarrega Puigdevall	Spain	0.146	50.22	
2nd place, silver medalist(s)	5	1146	Felipe Gomes	Brazil	0.175	50.38	
3rd place, bronze medalist(s)	1	1911	Ananias Shikongo	Namibia	0.202	50.63	
4	7	1167	Daniel Silva	Brazil	0.167	50.93	

=== T12 ===
The T12 category is for athletes with visual impairment. Athletes in this category will generally have some residual sight, the ability to recognise the shape of a hand at a distance of 2 metres and the ability to perceive clearly will be no more than 2/60. T12 athletes commonly run with guides.

19:31 9 September 2016:

Rank	Lane	Bib	Name	Nationality	Reaction	Time	Notes
1st place, gold medalist(s)	3	1258	Qichao Sun	China	0.150	48.57	
2nd place, silver medalist(s)	7	1846	Mahdi Afri	Morocco	0.138	49.00	
3rd place, bronze medalist(s)	5	2046	Luis Goncalves	Portugal	0.145	49.54	
4	1	1422	Joan Munar Martinez	Spain	0.173	50.08	

=== T13 ===
The T13 category is for athletes with a moderate visual impairment. Athletes in this category have a variety of visual impairments, but can typically recognize contours from a distance of 2 to 6 metres. Athletes in this category do not typically require a guide.

12:12 15 September 2016:

Rank	Lane	Bib	Name	Nationality	Reaction	Time	Notes
1st place, gold medalist(s)	5	1848	Mohamed Amguoun	Morocco	0.183	47.15	
2nd place, silver medalist(s)	3	1909	Johannes Nambala	Namibia	0.215	47.21	
3rd place, bronze medalist(s)	6	1016	Mohamed Fouad Hamoumou	Algeria	0.132	48.04	
4	8	1008	Fouad Baka	Algeria	0.183	49.09	
5	1	2366	Markeith Price	United States	0.208	49.96	
6	2	1136	Gustavo Henrique Araújo	Brazil	0.129	50.06	
7	7	2356	Tyson Gunter	United States	0.197	50.36	
	4	1007	Abdellatif Baka	Algeria			DSQ

=== T20 ===
The T20 category is for athletes with intellectual impairment. T20 athletes have an IQ score of 75 or less.

11:20 9 September 2016:

Rank	Lane	Bib	Name	Nationality	Reaction	Time	Notes
1st place, gold medalist(s)	4	1149	Daniel Martins	Brazil	0.157	47.22	
2nd place, silver medalist(s)	6	2411	Luis Arturo Paiva	Venezuela	0.148	47.83	
3rd place, bronze medalist(s)	5	1316	Gracelino Tavares Barbosa	Cape Verde	0.181	48.55	
4	8	1427	Dionibel Rodriguez Rodriguez	Spain	0.215	49.46	
5	7	1426	Deliber Rodriguez Ramirez	Spain	0.208	49.56	
6	3	1473	Rodrigue Massianga	France	0.209	49.71	
7	1	1709	Ruud Lorain Flovany Koutiki	Italy	0.135	51.14	
8	2	1395	Damian Carcelen	Ecuador	0.173	51.80	

=== T36 ===
The T36 category is for ambulant athletes with cerebral palsy. These athletes do not have the capacity to remain still and they show involuntary movements with all four limbs affected. They usually walk without assistive devices.

10:15 16 September 2016:

Rank	Lane	Bib	Name	Nationality	Reaction	Time	Notes
1st place, gold medalist(s)	8	1498	Paul Blake	Great Britain		54.49	
2nd place, silver medalist(s)	2	2327	Roman Pavlyk	Ukraine		55.67	
3rd place, bronze medalist(s)	7	1963	William Stedman	New Zealand		55.69	
4	6	2020	Krzysztof Ciuksza	Poland		55.97	
5	3	1235	Mian Che	China		57.26	
6	4	1919	Gabriel de Jesus Cuadra Holmann	Nicaragua		58.50	
7	5	1013	Sid Ali Bouzourine	Algeria		1:00.22	

=== T37 ===
The T37 category is for ambulant athletes with cerebral palsy. These athletes have movement and coordination problems on one half of their body. They have good ability in their dominant side of their body (ie hemiplegia).

10:23 16 September 2016:

Rank	Lane	Bib	Name	Nationality	Reaction	Time	Notes
1st place, gold medalist(s)	4	2081	Charl du Toit	South Africa		51.13	
2nd place, silver medalist(s)	6	2409	Omar Monterola	Venezuela		52.93	
3rd place, bronze medalist(s)	7	1015	Sofiane Hamdi	Algeria		53.01	
4	3	1409	Mostafa Fathalla Mohamed	Egypt		53.43	
5	1	1156	Paulo Pereira	Brazil		54.67	
6	5	1263	Jialong Wu	China		55.51	
7	8	1404	Mohamed Abdellatef	Egypt		55.61	
8	2	1469	Valentin Bertrand	France		55.72	

=== T38 ===
The T38 category is for ambulant athletes with cerebral palsy. T38 athletes have the mildest form of impairment caused by cerebral palsy, often in only one limb, and not affecting the ability to run, walk or jump freely, although impairing performance. T38 athletes may suffer minor co-ordination difficulties.

17:59 17 September 2016:

Rank	Lane	Bib	Name	Nationality	Reaction	Time	Notes
1st place, gold medalist(s)	5	2078	Dyan Neille Buis	South Africa		49.46	
2nd place, silver medalist(s)	7	1245	Jianwen Hu	China		50.27	
3rd place, bronze medalist(s)	4	1304	Weiner Javier Diaz Mosquera	Colombia		51.44	
4	8	2273	Mohamed Farhat Chida	Tunisia		51.49	
5	3	1274	Wenjun Zhou	China		52.43	
6	6	1305	Dixon de Jesus Hooker Velasquez	Colombia		54.80	
7	2	1873	Angel Moises Enriquez Torres	Mexico		54.97	
8	1	1272	Huanghao Zhong	China		55.06	

=== T44 ===
The T44 category is for athletes who have a single below knee amputation or who can walk with moderately reduced function in one or both legs.

11:38 15 September 2016:

Rank	Lane	Bib	Name	Nationality	Reaction	Time	Notes
1st place, gold medalist(s)	4	1960	Liam Malone	New Zealand		46.20	
2nd place, silver medalist(s)	6	1537	David Behre	Germany		46.23	
3rd place, bronze medalist(s)	3	2386	Hunter Woodhall	United States		46.70	
4	8	2350	Aj Digby	United States		47.34	
5	5	2371	Nick Rogers	United States		48.90	
6	1	1573	Michail Seitis	Greece		49.66	
7	7	2154	Ajith Prasanna Kumar Hettiarachchi	Sri Lanka		56.50	
8	2	1902	Kyaw Kyaw Win	Myanmar		56.74	

=== T47 ===
The T47 category is for athletes who have a single below elbow or wrist amputation or similar disability, with normal function in both legs.

18:05 17 September 2016:

Rank	Lane	Bib	Name	Nationality	Reaction	Time	Notes
1st place, gold medalist(s)	4	1348	Ernesto Blanco	Cuba		48.79	
2nd place, silver medalist(s)	5	1145	Petrúcio Ferreira dos Santos	Brazil		48.87	
3rd place, bronze medalist(s)	6	1076	Gunther Matzinger	Austria		48.95	
4	3	1718	Shane Hudson	Jamaica		49.07	
5	2	2406	Samuel Colmenares	Venezuela		49.55	
6	1	1360	Antonis Aresti	Cyprus		50.07	
	8	2098	Hermas Muvunyi	Rwanda			DSQ
	7	1283	Kouame Jean-Luc Noumbo	Ivory Coast			DSQ

=== T51 ===
The T51 category is for wheelchair athletes having spinal cord injuries, with mild weakness in shoulders, limited ability in straightening elbows and wrist function, and no finger, trunk or leg function.

10:54 17 September 2016:

Rank	Lane	Bib	Name	Nationality	Reaction	Time	Notes
1st place, gold medalist(s)	8	1101	Peter Genyn	Belgium		1:20.82	
2nd place, silver medalist(s)	2	1879	Edgar Cesareo Navarro Sanchez	Mexico		1:21.82	
3rd place, bronze medalist(s)	7	1706	Alvise de Vidi	Italy		1:22.38	
4	6	1011	Mohamed Berrahal	Algeria		1:24.06	
5	3	1515	Stephen Osborne	Great Britain		1:25.05	
6	4	1458	Toni Piispanen	Finland		1:30.27	
7	5	2050	Helder Mestre	Portugal		1:30.82	

=== T52 ===
The T52 category is for wheelchair athletes with damage to spinal cord in the higher parts of the back, substantially impaired or no trunk function, and minimal or no leg function. Pushing power comes from elbow extensions, and appears close to normal except for use of modified gloves to compensate for grip.

10:20 13 September 2016:

Rank	Lane	Bib	Name	Nationality	Reaction	Time	Notes
1st place, gold medalist(s)	3	2363	Raymond Martin	United States		58.42	
2nd place, silver medalist(s)	4	1741	Tomoki Sato	Japan		58.88	
3rd place, bronze medalist(s)	5	2359	Gianfranco Iannotta	United States		1:02.16	
4	6	1881	Leonardo de Jesus Perez Juarez	Mexico		1:02.87	
5	2	2231	Pichaya Kurattanasiri	Thailand		1:03.27	
6	1	1745	Hirokazu Ueyonabaru	Japan		1:04.72	
7	8	2001	Jerrold Pete Mangliwan	Philippines		1:04.93	
8	7	2053	Mario Trindade	Portugal		1:05.35	

=== T53 ===
The T53 category is for wheelchair athletes with normal use of arms and hands, no or limited trunk function, and no leg function.

11:35 11 September 2016:

Rank	Lane	Athlete	Nationality	Time	Notes
1st place, gold medalist(s)		Pongsakorn Paeyo	Thailand	47.91	
2nd place, silver medalist(s)		Brent Lakatos	Canada	48.53	
3rd place, bronze medalist(s)		Pierre Fairbank	France	49.00	
4		Li Huzhao	China	50.11	
5		Brian Siemann	Netherlands	50.20	
6		Zhao Yufei	China	50.42	
7		Joshua George	United States	50.80	
8		Moatez Jomni	Great Britain	51.53	

=== T54 ===
The T54 category is for wheelchair athletes with no leg function, but near full arm function and reasonable to normal trunk function. Typically this may be caused by a lower spinal cord injury or spinal cord birth defect.

10:16 12 September 2016:

Rank	Lane	Athlete	Nationality	Time	Notes
1st place, gold medalist(s)	5	Kenny van Weeghel	Netherlands	46.65	
2nd place, silver medalist(s)	6	Liu Yang	China	46.79	
3rd place, bronze medalist(s)	2	Yassine Gharbi	Tunisia	47.07	
4	7	Richard Chiassaro	Great Britain	47.17	
5	4	David Weir	Great Britain	47.30	
6	8	Cui Yanfeng	China	47.63	
7	1	Saichon Konjen	Thailand	47.66	
8	3	Liu Chengming	China	47.69	
