= Athletics at the 2020 Summer Paralympics – Men's 400 metres T12 =

Men's 400 metres T12 at the XVI Paralympic Games
- Venue: Tokyo National Stadium
- Dates: 31 August 2021 (heats); 2 September 2021 (final)
- Competitors: 8 from 6 nations
- Winning time: 47.59

Medalists
1st place, gold medalist(s)		Abdeslam Hili	Morocco
2nd place, silver medalist(s)		Noah Malone	United States
3rd place, bronze medalist(s)		Rouay Jebabli	Tunisia

The men's 400 metres T12 event at the 2020 Summer Paralympics in Tokyo, took place between 31 August and 2 September 2021.

The T12 category is for athletes with visual impairment. Athletes in this category will generally have some residual sight, the ability to recognise the shape of a hand at a distance of 2 metres and the ability to perceive clearly will be no more than 2/60. T12 athletes commonly run with guides.

== Records ==
Prior to the competition, the existing records were as follows:

World Record	Abdeslam Hili (MAR)	47.79	Dubai, United Arab Emirates	9 November 2019
Paralympic Record	Mahmoud Khaldi (TUN)	48.52	London, United Kingdom	6 September 2012

Area	Time	Athlete	Nation
Africa	47.79 WR	Abdeslam Hili	Morocco
America	49.38	Noah Malone	United States
Asia	48.57	Sun Qichao	China
Europe	48.62	Gabriel Potra	Portugal
Oceania	53.60	Jonathan Fitzpatrick	Australia

== Results ==
=== Heats ===
Heat 1 took place on 31 August 2021, at 21:17:

Rank	Lane	Name	Nationality	Time	Notes
1	7	Abdeslam Hili	Morocco	48.78	Q, SB
2	5	Yamil Acosta	Colombia	50.95	
3	3	Achraf Lahouel	Tunisia	51.37	SB

Heat 2 took place on 31 August 2021, at 21:25:

Rank	Lane	Name	Nationality	Time	Notes
1	3	Rouay Jebabli	Tunisia	48.69	Q, PB
2	5	Oğuz Akbulut	Turkey	49.17	SB

Heat 3 took place on 31 August 2021, at 21:33:

Rank	Lane	Name	Nationality	Time	Notes
1	5	Noah Malone	United States	48.50	Q, GR
2	3	Mahdi Afri	Morocco	48.53	q, SB
3	7	Fabrício Barros	Brazil	52.42	SB

=== Final ===
The final took place on 2 September 2021, at 9:42:

Rank	Lane	Name	Nationality	Time	Notes
1st place, gold medalist(s)	7	Abdeslam Hili	Morocco	47.59	WR
2nd place, silver medalist(s)	3	Noah Malone	United States	47.93	AR
3rd place, bronze medalist(s)	5	Rouay Jebabli	Tunisia	48.01	PB
4	1	Mahdi Afri	Morocco	48.93	
