= Najwa Awane =

Moroccan wheelchair tennis player

- Born: 18 April 1998 (age 27) Tétouan, Morocco
- Plays: Right-handed

Singles
- Career titles: 7
- Highest ranking: No. 29 (4 December 2023)
- Current ranking: No. 111 (18 August 2025)

Other tournaments
- Paralympic Games: 1R (2020, 2024)

Doubles
- Career titles: 9
- Highest ranking: No. 31 (26 August 2024)
- Current ranking: No. 130 (18 August 2025)
- Paralympic Games: 1R (2024)
Medal record
Representing Morocco
African Para Games
Gold medal – first place	2023 Accra	Women's singles
Gold medal – first place	2023 Accra	Women's doubles

Najwa Awane (born 18 April 1998) is a Moroccan wheelchair tennis player, she reached her highest world ranking of 29 in December 2023. She competed at the 2020 and 2024 Summer Paralympics, Awane was the first Moroccan female wheelchair tennis player to compete at the Paralympic Games.

Awane was bitten by a pitbull dog in 2008 which resulted in the amputation of her left leg.
