= Mouncef Bouja =

Moroccan paralympic athlete

Sport
- Country: Morocco
- Sport: Para-athletics
Medal record
Para-athletics
Representing Morocco
Paralympic Games
| Gold medal – first place | 2024 Paris | 400 m T12 |
World Championships
| Silver medal – second place | 2023 Paris | 100 m T12 |
| Silver medal – second place | 2024 Kobe | 400 m T12 |

Mouncef Bouja (born 6 March 1998) is a Moroccan paralympic athlete. He competed at the 2024 Summer Paralympics, winning the gold medal in the men's 400 metres T12 event.
