= Aymane El Haddaoui =

Moroccan paralympic athlete (born 2000)

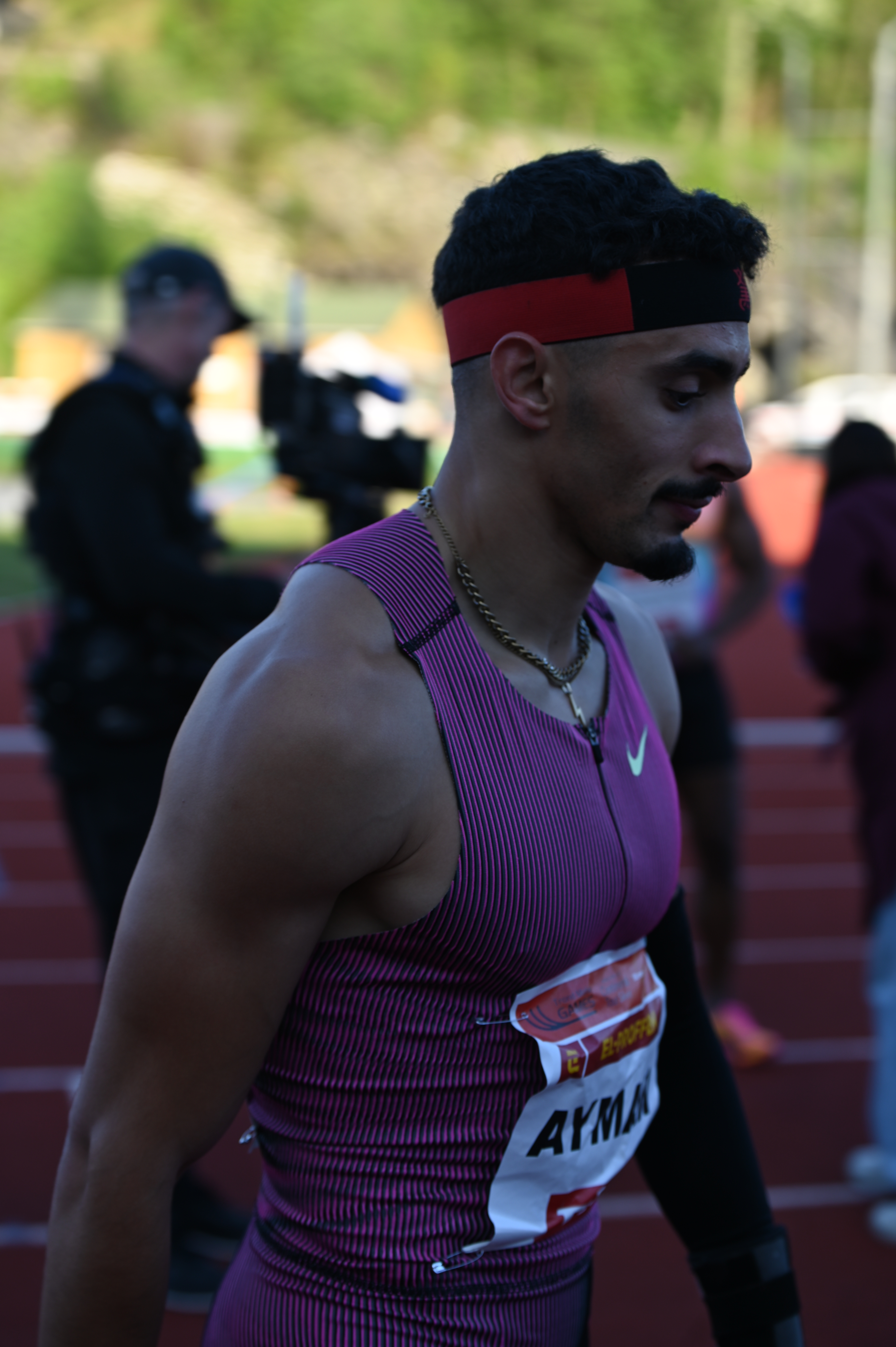

Personal information
- Born: 13 June 2000 (age 26)

Sport
- Country: Morocco
- Sport: Para-athletics
- Disability class: T47
Medal record
Men's para-athletics
Representing Morocco
Paralympic Games
Gold medal – first place	2024 Paris	400 m T47
Bronze medal – third place	2024 Paris	100 m T47
World Championships
Gold medal – first place	2025 New Delhi	400 m T47
Bronze medal – third place	2025 New Delhi	100 m T47

Aymane El Haddaoui (born 13 June 2000) is a Moroccan paralympic athlete. He won the bronze medal in the men's 100 metres T47 event at the 2024 Summer Paralympics. He had also won a gold medal in the men's 400 metres T47 event at the 2024 Summer Paralympics, creating a world record in the event running at 46.65 seconds.
