= Hayat El Garaa =

Moroccan Paralympic athlete (born 1996)

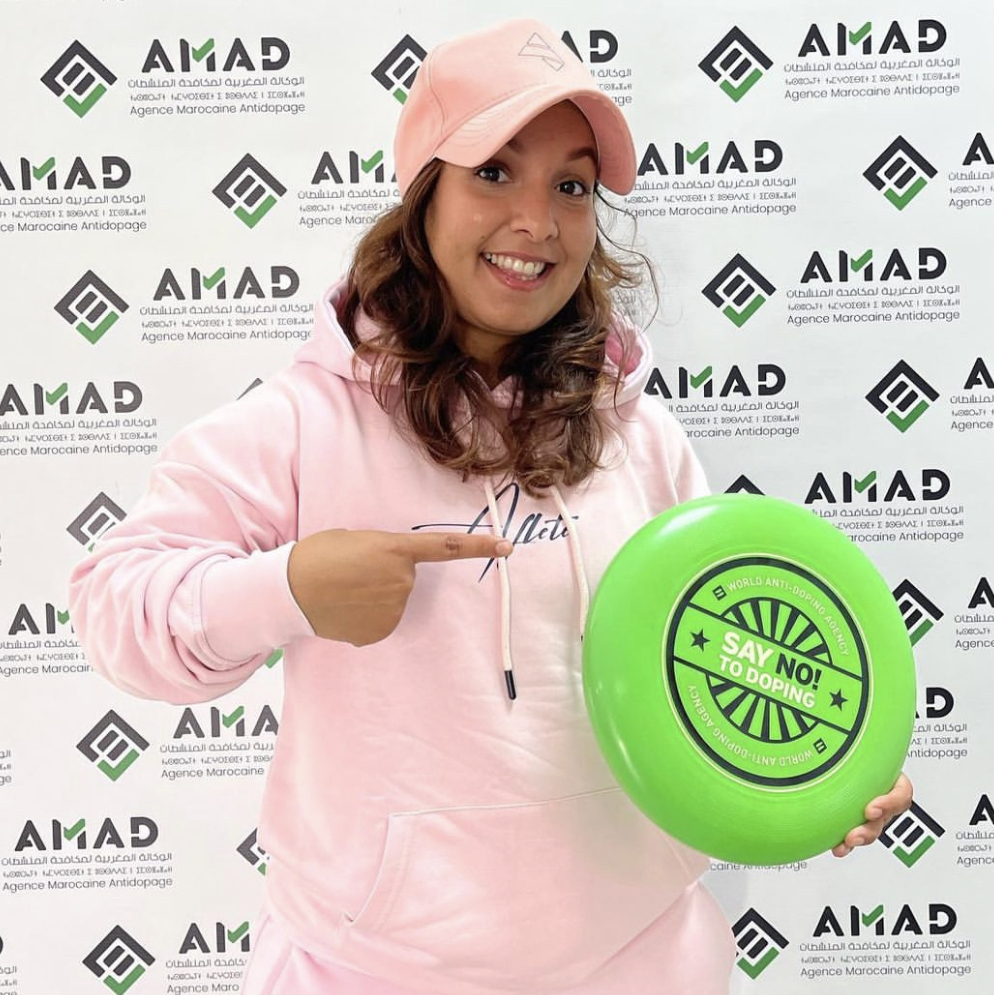

Personal information
- Nationality: Moroccan
- Born: 2 March 1996 (age 30)

Sport
- Sport: Paralympic athletics
- Disability class: F41
- Event(s): shot put discus throw
- Club: Friends Club
- Coached by: Zedmout Aziz; Lakhdar Abdelouaha
Medal record
Women's para-athletics
Representing Morocco
Paralympic Games
Bronze medal – third place	2020 Tokyo	discus throw F41

Hayat El Garaa (born 2 March 1996) is a Moroccan para-athlete who specializes in throwing events. She represented Morocco at the Paralympic Games.

== Career ==
El Garaa represented Morocco in the women's shot put F41 event at the 2016 Summer Paralympics and finished in seventh place with a throw of 6.97 metres. She again represented Morocco in the women's discus throw F41 event at the 2020 Summer Paralympics and won a bronze medal.

== Personal life ==
Her sisters Najat and Laila are both Paralympic medalists.
