= Football 5-a-side at the 2020 Summer Paralympics =

Football 5-a-side at the XVI Paralympic Games
- Football 5-a-side pictogram of the 2020 Summer Paralympics
- Venue: Aomi Urban Sports Park
- Dates: 29 August – 4 September 2021
- Competitors: 96 from 8 nations

Medalists
1st place, gold medalist(s)		Brazil
2nd place, silver medalist(s)		Argentina
3rd place, bronze medalist(s)		Morocco

Football 5-a-side at the 2020 Summer Paralympics was held at the Aomi Urban Sports Park in Tokyo.

The 2020 Summer Olympic and Paralympic Games were postponed to 2021 due to the COVID-19 pandemic. They kept the 2020 name and were held from 24 August to 5 September 2021.

== Qualifying ==
There are 8 men's teams who compete in the competition. Each team must have a maximum of fifteen squad members: eight outfield players, two goalkeepers with the other members being one guide, one coach with an assistant coach, along with a doctor and physiotherapist. Iran the finalists of Football 5-a-side at the 2016 Summer Paralympics withdraw due to Financial problems of players and Political reasons.

Means of qualification	Date	Venue	Berths	Qualified
2018 IBSA World Blind Football Championship	5–16 June 2018	(Spain) Madrid	1	Brazil (BRA)
2019 Americas Regional Championships	2–10 June 2019	(Brazil) São Paulo	1	Argentina (ARG)
2019 European Championships	15–24 September 2019	(Italy) Rome	2	France (FRA); Spain (ESP)
2019 Asia Regional Championships	30 September – 6 October 2019	(Thailand) Pattaya	2	~~Iran (IRI)~~; China (CHN); Thailand (THA)
2019 Africa Regional Championships	22 November – 1 December 2019	(Nigeria) Enugu	1	Morocco (MAR)
Host country allocation	7 September 2013	(Argentina) Buenos Aires	1	Japan (JPN)
Total			8	

== Schedule ==
G	Group stage	C	Classification matches	½	Semi-finals	B	Bronze medal match	F	Final

Date Event	Wed 25 Aug	Thu 26 Aug	Fri 27 Aug	Sat 28 Aug	Sun 29 Aug	Mon 30 Aug	Tue 31 Aug	Wed 1 Sep	Thu 2 Sep		Fri 3 Sep	Sat 4 Sep		Sun 5 Sep
Men's tournament					G	G	G		C (5th/6th) (7th/8th)	½		B	F	

== Medalists ==
Event	Gold	Silver	Bronze
Men's team	Brazil (BRA); Cássio Reis; Damião Robson; Gledson da Paixão; Jardiel Vieira Soares; Jefinho; Luan de Lacerda; Matheus Bumussa; Nonato; Ricardinho; Tiago da Silva	Argentina (ARG); Federico Accardi; Ángel Deldo; Maximiliano Espinillo; Nahuel Heredia; Darío Lencina; Germán Muleck; Froilán Padilla; Marcelo Panizza; Braian Pereyra; Nicolás Véliz	Morocco (MAR); Abdellali Ait Al-Hakem; Elhabib Ait Bajja; Samir Bara; Imad Berka; Kamal Boughlam; Said El-Mselek; Houssam Ghilli; Ayoub Hadimi; Abderrazak Hattab; Zouhair Snisla

== Preliminary round ==
=== Group A ===
Pos	Team	Pld	W	D	L	GF	GA	GD	Pts	Qualification
1	Brazil	3	3	0	0	11	0	+11	9	Semi finals
2	China	3	2	0	1	3	3	0	6	Semi finals
3	Japan	3	1	0	2	4	6	−2	3	5th–6th place match
4	France	3	0	0	3	0	9	−9	0	7th–8th place match

Source: TOCOG
29 August 2021
9:00

Japan	4–0	France
Kuroda 4', 9'; Kawamura 19', 27' (pen.)	Report

Aomi Urban Sports Park, Tokyo
Referee: Lucio Morgado (Brazil)

29 August 2021
11:30

Brazil	3–0	China
Nonato 15', 36'; Cássio 25' (pen.)	Report

Aomi Urban Sports Park, Tokyo
Referee: François Carcouët (France)

30 August 2021
9:00

China	1–0	France
Zhu Ruiming 37'	Report

Aomi Urban Sports Park, Tokyo
Referee: Stuart Winton (Great Britain)

30 August 2021
11:30

Brazil	4–0	Japan
Nonato 5'; Tiago Paraná 25'; Ricardinho 36', 39'	Report

Aomi Urban Sports Park, Tokyo
Referee: Germinal Lubrano (Argentina)

31 August 2021
9:00

Japan	0–2	China
	Report	Zhu Ruiming 12', 18'

Aomi Urban Sports Park, Tokyo
Referee: François Carcouët (France)

31 August 2021
11:30

France	0–4	Brazil
	Report	Nonato 16', 26' (pen.); Jardiel 35', 39'

Aomi Urban Sports Park, Tokyo
Referee: Attila Balint (Hungary)

=== Group B ===
Pos	Team	Pld	W	D	L	GF	GA	GD	Pts	Qualification
1	Argentina	3	3	0	0	7	1	+6	9	Semi finals
2	Morocco	3	1	1	1	4	3	+1	4	Semi finals
3	Spain	3	1	1	1	2	3	−1	4	5th–6th place match
4	Thailand	3	0	0	3	0	6	−6	0	7th–8th place match

Source: TOCOG
29 August 2021
16:30

Argentina	2–1	Morocco
Espinillo 3', 15'	Report	Snisla 9'

Aomi Urban Sports Park, Tokyo
Referee: Attila Balint (Hungary)

29 August 2021
19:30

Spain	1–0	Thailand
Martin 40'	Report

Aomi Urban Sports Park, Tokyo
Referee: Urabe Yasushi (Japan)

30 August 2021
16:30

Thailand	0–2	Morocco
	Report	Snisla 6', 20'

Aomi Urban Sports Park, Tokyo
Referee: Kazuo Takagi (Japan)

30 August 2021
19:30

Spain	0–2	Argentina
	Report	Espinillo 8', 40'

Aomi Urban Sports Park, Tokyo
Referee: Lucio Morgado (Brazil)

31 August 2021
16:30

Argentina	3–0	Thailand
Espinillo 13'; Deldo 20'; Veliz 38'	Report

Aomi Urban Sports Park, Tokyo
Referee: Lucio Morgado (Brazil)

31 August 2021
19:30

Morocco	1–1	Spain
Snisla 18'	Report	Martin 30'

Aomi Urban Sports Park, Tokyo
Referee: Germinal Lubrano (Argentina)

== Knockout stage ==
=== Bracket ===
Semi-finals
2 September
China	0
Argentina	2
2 September
Brazil	1
Morocco	0

Gold medal match
4 September
Argentina	0
Brazil	1
Bronze medal match
4 September
China	0
Morocco	4

=== 7th–8th classification matches ===
2 September 2021
9:00

France	2–3	Thailand
Youme 29', 31'	Report	Buadee 9'; Kupan 17', 27'

Aomi Urban Sports Park, Tokyo
Referee: Attila Balint (Hungary)

=== 5th–6th classification matches ===
2 September 2021
11:30

Japan	1–0	Spain
Kuroda 20'	Report

Aomi Urban Sports Park, Tokyo
Referee: Rafael Gonzalez (Mexico)

=== Semi-finals ===
2 September 2021
16:30

China	0–2	Argentina
	Report	Espinillo 18', 22'

Aomi Urban Sports Park, Tokyo
Referee: Lucio Morgado (Brazil)

2 September 2021
19:30

Brazil	1–0	Morocco
Berka 28' (o.g.)	Report

Aomi Urban Sports Park, Tokyo
Referee: François Carcouët (France)

=== Bronze medal match ===
4 September 2021
11:30

China	0–4	Morocco
	Report	Snisla 4', 8', 18', 30'

Aomi Urban Sports Park, Tokyo
Referee: Lucio Morgado (Brazil)

=== Gold medal match ===
4 September 2021
17:30

Argentina	0–1	Brazil
	Report	Nonato 33'

Aomi Urban Sports Park, Tokyo
Referee: François Carcouët (France)

== Final rankings ==
Rank	Team
Gold medal	Brazil
Silver medal	Argentina
Bronze medal	Morocco
4	China
5	Japan
6	Spain
7	Thailand
8	France

== See also ==
- Football at the 2020 Summer Olympics
