= Zouhair Snisla =

Moroccan football player

Personal information
- Nationality: Moroccan
- Born: 25 January 1999 (age 27)

Sport
- Country: Morocco
- Sport: 5-a-side football
Medal record
5-a-side football
Representing Morocco
Paralympic Games
Bronze medal – third place	2020 Tokyo	Men's team

Zouhair Snisla (born 25 January 1999) is a Moroccan blind 5-a-side football player.

== Career ==
He made his debut appearance at the Paralympics representing Morocco at the 2016 Summer Paralympics was named in the Moroccan squad for the football 5-a-side tournament. It also marked Morocco's first appearance in a 5-a-side football competition at the Paralympics and Morocco also became the first African nation to take part in a 5-a-side football tournament at a Paralympic event. He was a key member of the Moroccan side which won the 2019 IBSA Blind Football African Championships.

He made his second appearance at the Paralympics during the 2020 Summer Paralympics representing Morocco in the football 5-a-side tournament at the 2020 Summer Paralympics. He gained spotlight and rose to prominence during the 2020 Tokyo Paralympics where he single-handedly helped Morocco to claim historic bronze medal in the men's 5-a-side football tournament by scoring four goals in the bronze medal match against People's Republic of China. It was also Morocco's first medal in football 5-a-side at the Summer Paralympics. One of his goals, where he managed to pull it from the opponents using his exceptional dribbling skills without the assistance of his fellow Moroccan players, gained large public attention, and his skills were also compared to those of Argentine veteran footballer Lionel Messi. Snisla went onto score all of his team's goals and he scored the goals in the 4th, 8th, 18th and 30th minute of the bronze medal match.

He also played a pivotal role in helping Morocco to win the 2022 IBSA Blind Football African Championship which was held in Morocco where Morocco defeated Mali 2–0 in the final. Zouhair Snisla emerged as the top goalscorer in the competition with 5 goals.
