= Mahdi Afri =

Moroccan Paralympic athlete

Personal information
- Born: 1 January 1996 (age 30)

Sport
- Country: Morocco
- Sport: Para-athletics
- Disability: Vision impairment
- Disability class: T12
- Events: 200 metres; 400 metres
Medal record
Paralympic Games
| Silver medal – second place | 2016 Rio de Janeiro | 400 m T12 |
| Bronze medal – third place | 2016 Rio de Janeiro | 200 m T12 |
World Championships
| Gold medal – first place | 2017 London | 200 m T12 |
| Gold medal – first place | 2017 London | 400 m T12 |
| Silver medal – second place | 2019 Dubai | 400 m T12 |
Islamic Solidarity Games
| Gold medal – first place | 2017 Baku | 400 m T12 |
| Bronze medal – third place | 2017 Baku | 100 m T12 |

Mahdi Afri (born 1 January 1996) is a visually impaired Moroccan Paralympic athlete competing in T12-classification sprinting events. He represented Morocco at the 2016 Summer Paralympics held in Rio de Janeiro, Brazil and he won two medals: the silver medal in the men's 400 metres T12 event and the bronze medal in the men's 200 metres T12 event.

At the 2017 Islamic Solidarity Games in Baku, Azerbaijan, he won two medals: the gold medal in the men's 400 metres T12 event and the bronze medal in the 100 metres T12 event.

At the 2017 World Championships he won the gold medal in both the men's 200 metres T12 and men's 400 metres T12 events. Two years later, at the 2019 World Championships, he won the silver medal in the men's 400 metres T12 event.
