= Ayoub Sadni =

Moroccan Paralympic athlete

Personal information
- Nationality: Morocco
- Born: 23 April 1999 (age 27) Rabat, Morocco

Sport
- Sport: Paralympic athletics
- Disability class: T47
- Coached by: Mohamed Sindaoui
Medal record
Paralympic athletics
Representing Morocco
Paralympic Games
Gold medal – first place	2020 Tokyo	400 m T47
Silver medal – second place	2024 Paris	400 m T47
World Championships
Gold medal – first place	2023 Paris	400 m T47
Gold medal – first place	2024 Kobe	400 m T47
Bronze medal – third place	2019 Dubai	400 m T47

Ayoub Sadni (born 23 April 1999) is a Moroccan Paralympic athlete specializing in sprints. He represented Morocco at the 2020 Summer Paralympics.

== Career ==
Sadni represented Morocco at the 2020 Summer Paralympics in the 400 metres T47 event and won a gold medal.
