= Abdeslam Hili =

Moroccan Paralympic athlete (born 1996)

Abdelslam Hili
Personal information
- Nationality: Moroccan
- Born: 19 December 1996 (age 29) Casablanca, Morocco

Sport
- Sport: Paralympic athletics
- Disability class: T12
- Event: Sprints
- Club: Raja Club Athletic
- Coached by: Serge Churyumov
Medal record
Men's para-athletics
Representing Morocco
Paralympic Games
Gold medal – first place	2020 Tokyo	400 m T12

Abdeslam Hili (born 19 December 1996) is a Moroccan para-athlete who specializes in sprints. He represented Morocco at the 2020 Summer Paralympics.

== Career ==
Hili represented Morocco in the 400 metres T12 event at the 2020 Summer Paralympics and won a gold medal.
