= Youssef Benibrahim =

Moroccan Paralympic athlete

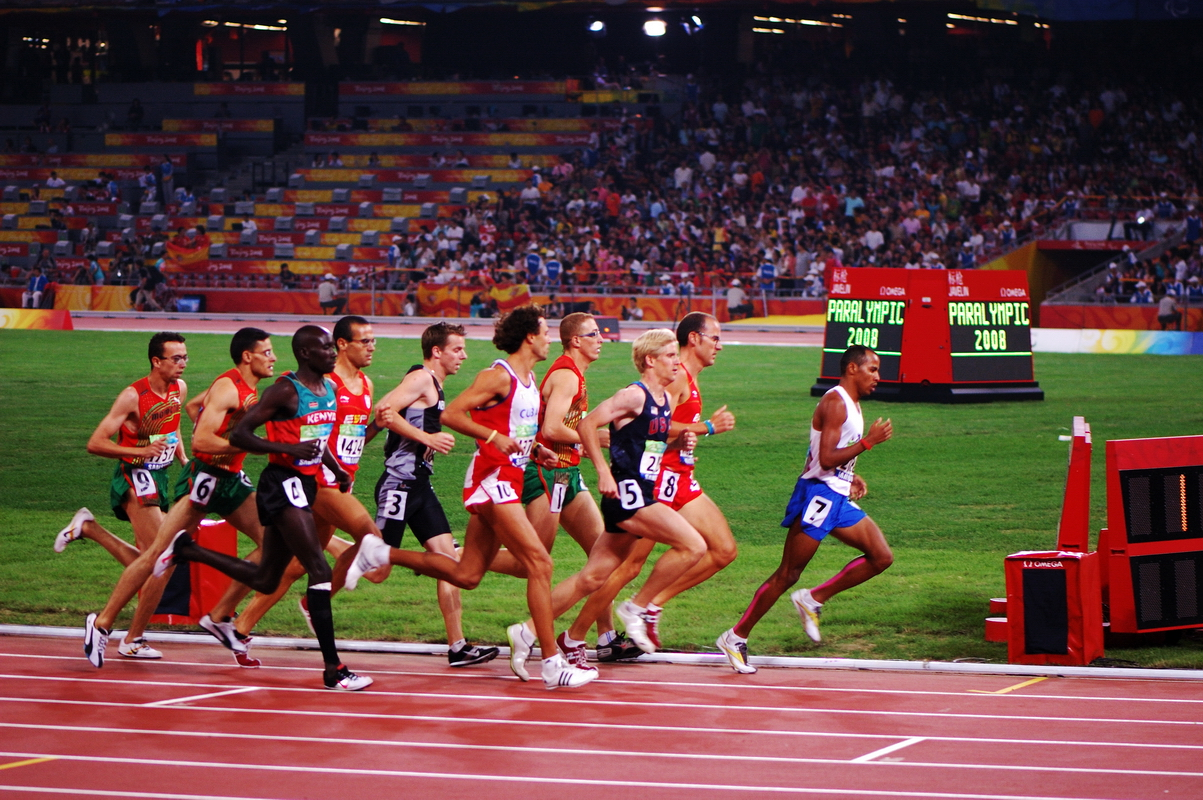
- Youssef Benibrahim (number 9) in the men's 1500 metres T13 final at the 2008 Summer Paralympics

Medal record

Paralympic athletics

Representing Morocco

Paralympic Games
Silver medal – second place	2008 Beijing	5000m - T13

IPC World Championships
Gold medal – first place	2017 London	5000m - T13
Bronze medal – third place	2015 Doha	5000m - T13

Youssef Benibrahim (born 19 July 1983) is a Paralympic athlete from Morocco competing mainly in category T13 long-distance events.

== Biography ==
He competed in the 2008 Summer Paralympics in Beijing, China. There he won a silver medal in the men's 5000 metres - T13 event and finished fourth in the men's 1500 metres - T13 event.

At the 2017 World Para Athletics Championships held in London, United Kingdom he won the gold medal in the men's 5000 metres T13 event.
