= Saida Amoudi =

Moroccan Paralympic athlete

Personal information
- Nationality: Moroccan
- Born: August 23, 1980 (age 46)

Sport
- Sport: Paralympic athletics
- Disability class: F34
- Events: shot put javelin throw
- Club: Olympic Club de Safi
- Coached by: Zedmout Aziz; Lakhdar Abdelouahab
Medal record
Women's para-athletics
Representing Morocco
Paralympic Games
Bronze medal – third place	2020 Tokyo	Shot put F34
Bronze medal – third place	2024 Paris	Shot put F34
World Championships
Silver medal – second place	2019 Dubai	Shot put F34
Bronze medal – third place	2023 Paris	Shot put F34
Bronze medal – third place	2024 Kobe	Shot put F34

Saida Amoudi (born August 23, 1980) is a Moroccan para-athlete who specializes in throwing events. She represented Morocco at the 2020 Summer Paralympics.

== Career ==
Amoudi represented Morocco in the women's shot put F34 event at the 2020 Summer Paralympics and won a bronze medal, Morocco's first medal of the 2020 Paralympic Games.
