= Youssra Karim =

Moroccan Paralympic athlete (born 1997)

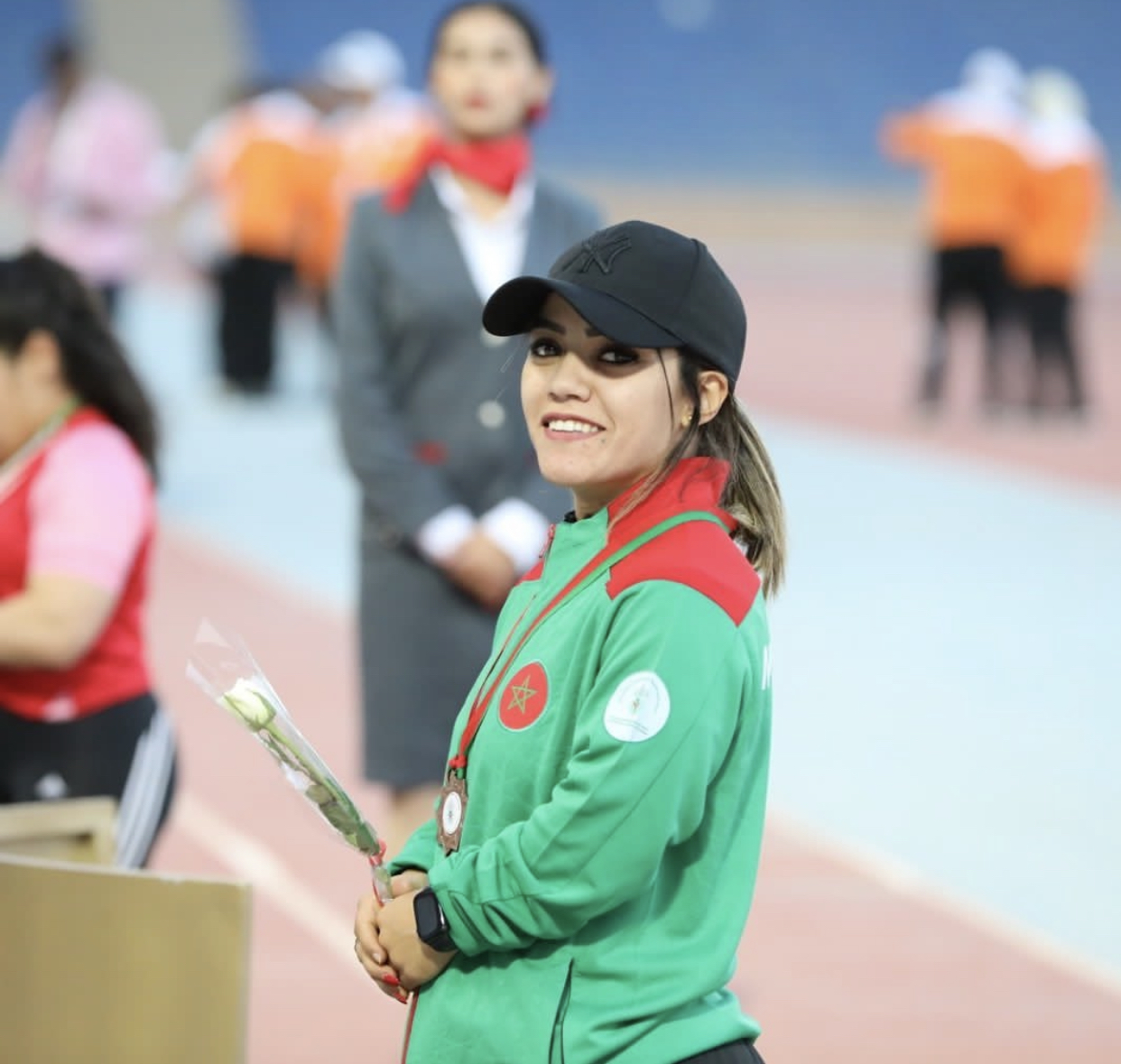

Personal information
- Nationality: Moroccan
- Born: 26 March 1997 (age 29) El Jadida, Morocco

Sport
- Sport: Paralympic athletics
- Disability class: F41
- Event(s): Shot put Discus throw
- Club: Club Amis de Fes
- Coached by: Zedmout Aziz; Lakhdar Abdelouaha; Alal Taky
Medal record
Women's para-athletics
Representing Morocco
Paralympic Games
Silver medal – second place	2020 Tokyo	Discus throw F41
Silver medal – second place	2024 Paris	Discus throw F41
World Championships
Gold medal – first place	2024 Kobe	Discus throw F41
Silver medal – second place	2019 Dubai	Discus throw F41
Silver medal – second place	2023 Paris	Discus throw F41

Youssra Karim (born 26 March 1997) is a Moroccan para-athlete who specializes in throwing events. She represented Morocco at the Paralympic Games.

== Career ==
Karim competed in the able-bodied weightlifting in the 58 kg category at the 2014 Summer Youth Olympics.

Karim represented Morocco in the women's shot put F41 event at the 2016 Summer Paralympics and finished in fourth place with a personal best of 8.16 metres. Karim represented Morocco in the women's discus throw F41 event at the 2020 Summer Paralympics and won a silver medal.
