= Laila El Garaa =

Moroccan Paralympic athlete

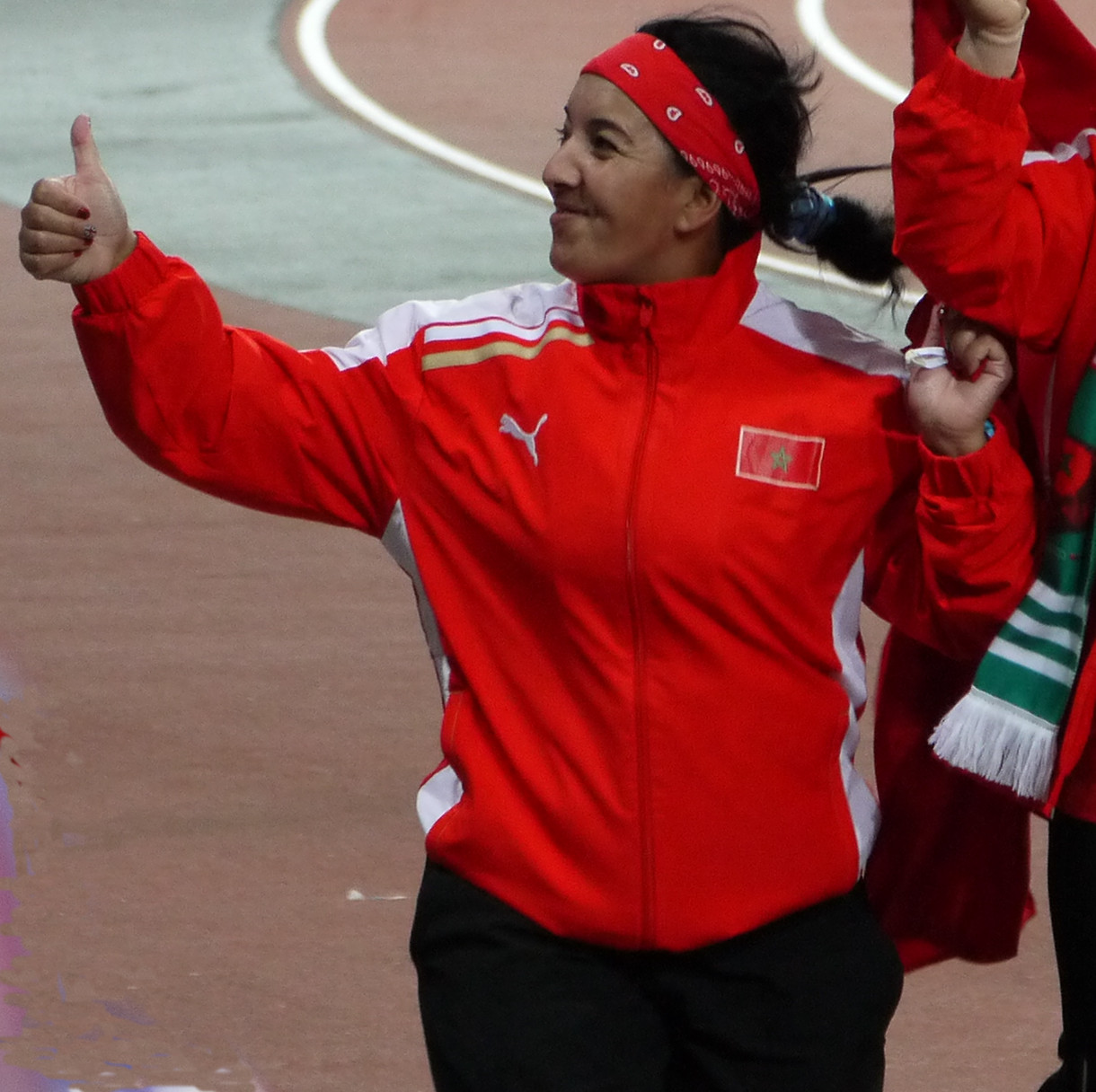

Personal information
- Years active: 2006–2012 (Track and field F40)

Sport
- Disability class: F40
Medal record
Women's para athletics
Representing Morocco
Paralympic Games
Silver medal – second place	2004 Athens	Shot put – F40
Bronze medal – third place	2008 Beijing	Shot put – F40

Laila El Garaa (Arabic: ليلى الڭرعة) is a Paralympian athlete from Morocco competing mainly in category F40 shot put events.

== Career ==
She competed in the 2004 Summer Paralympics in Athens, Greece. There she won a silver medal in the women's F40 shot put event. She also took part in the women's F40 javelin throw

She also competed in the 2008 Summer Paralympics in Beijing, China. There she won a bronze medal in the women's F40 shot put event. She also took part in the women's F40 discus throw.

== Personal life ==
Her sisters Najat and Hayat are both Paralympic medalists.
