= Abdelillah Mame =

Moroccan Paralympic athlete

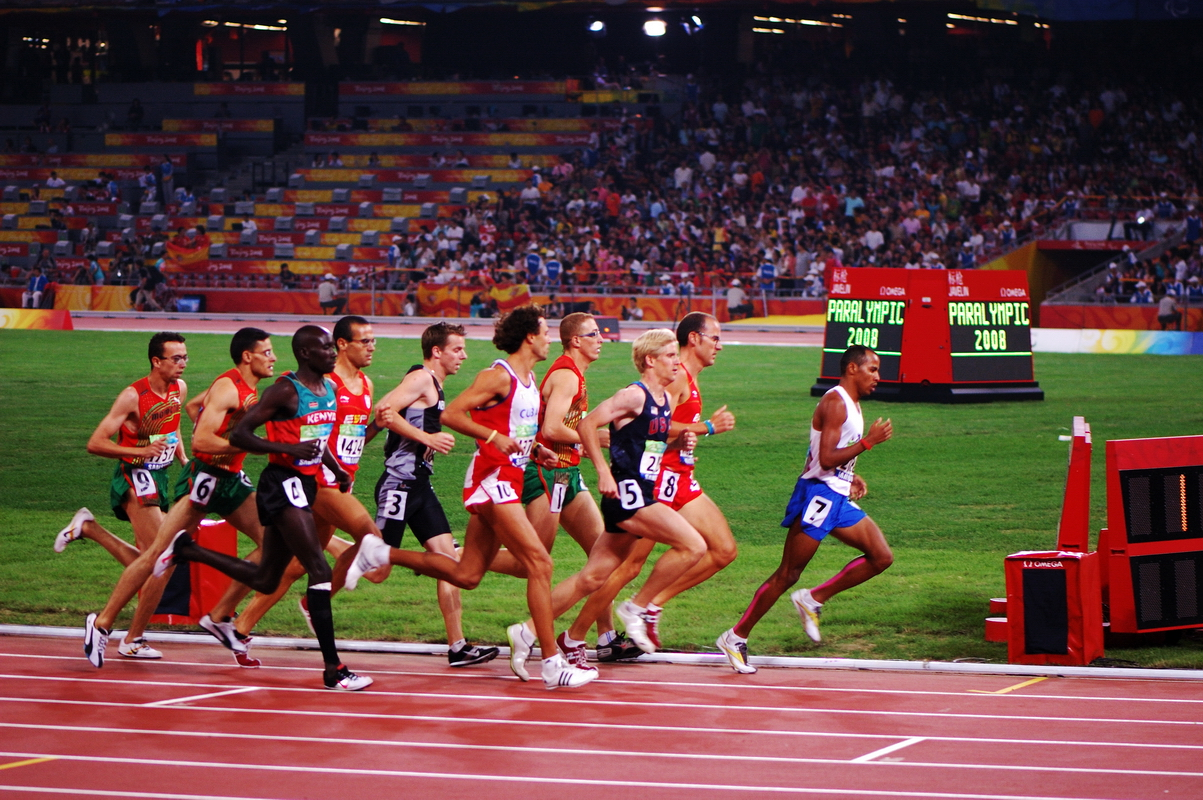
- Mame (number 6) in the men's 1500 metres T13 final at the 2008 Summer Paralympics

Medal record

Men's para athletics

Representing Morocco

Paralympic Games
Gold medal – first place	2008 Beijing	800 m – T13
Bronze medal – third place	2012 London	800 m – T13

World Championships
Gold medal – first place	2015 Doha	1,500 m T13
Bronze medal – third place	2013 Lyon	800 m T13

Abdelillah Mame (born 10 November 1975) is a Paralympian athlete from Morocco competing mainly in category T13 middle-distance events.

He competed in the 2008 Summer Paralympics in Beijing, China. There he won a gold medal in the men's 800 metres – T13 event, finished fourth in the men's 400 metres – T13 event and finished sixth in the men's 1500 metres – T13 event
