= Azeddine Nouiri =

Moroccan wheelchair athlete (born 1986)

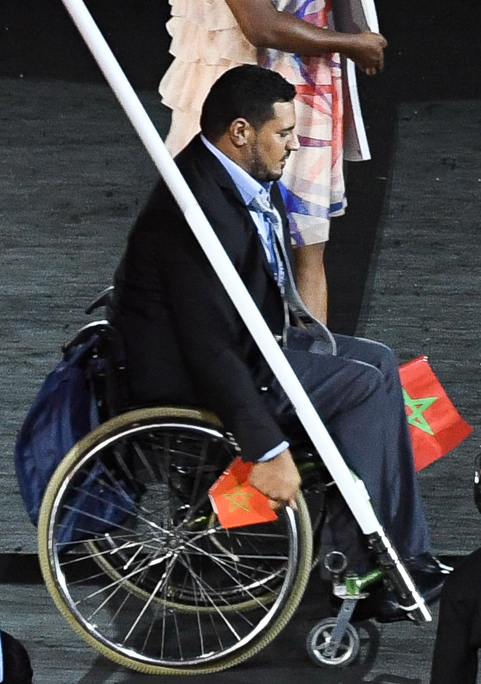
- Nouiri at the 2016 Paralympics

Personal information
- Nationality: Moroccan
- Born: 21 July 1986 (age 39) Casablanca, Morocco
- Height: 189 cm (6 ft 2 in)

Sport
- Country: Morocco
- Sport: Paralympic athletics
- Disability class: F34
- Event(s): Shot put, javelin throw
- Club: Club Sportif de l'Association d'Aide des handicapés du Sud du Maroc
Medal record
Representing Morocco
Paralympic Games
Gold medal – first place	2012 London	Shot put F34
Gold medal – first place	2016 Rio de Janeiro	Shot put F34
Silver medal – second place	2020 Tokyo	Shot put F34
Silver medal – second place	2024 Paris	Shot put F34

Azeddine Nouiri (born 21 July 1986) is a Moroccan wheelchair athlete who competes in throwing events. He won the F34 classification shot put competition at the 2012 and 2016 Paralympics, setting a world record at 13.10 metres in 2012. In the javelin throw he finished tenth and seventh, respectively. He served as the flag bearer for Morocco at the 2016 Summer Paralympics Parade of Nations.

At the 2013 IPC Athletics World Championships, Nouiri placed fourth in the shot put and lost his world record to Scott Jones.
