= Mohamed Amguoun =

Moroccan Paralympic athlete

Personal information
- Nationality: Moroccan
- Born: 8 November 1988 (age 37) Casablanca, Morocco
- Height: 189 cm (6 ft 2 in)

Sport
- Country: Morocco
- Sport: Athletics
- Disability class: T13
- Events: sprint, middle-distance
Medal record
Men's Paralympic athletics
Representing Morocco
Paralympic Games
Gold medal – first place	2016 Rio de Janeiro	400 m T13
Silver medal – second place	2020 Tokyo	400 m T13
Bronze medal – third place	2012 London	400 m T13
IPC World Championships
Gold medal – first place	2017 London	400 m T13
Gold medal – first place	2015 Doha	400 m T13
Bronze medal – third place	2015 Doha	800 m T13

Mohamed Amguoun (born 8 November 1988) is a visually impaired Moroccan sprinter and middle-distance runner. Competing in the T13 classification, Amguoun represented Morocco at the 2012 Summer Paralympics in London, where he won the bronze medal in the 400m sprint. He is also a World Championship winning athlete, taking gold in his favoured 400m race at the 2015 IPC Athletics World Championships in Doha.
