= Najat El Garaa =

Moroccan Paralympic athlete

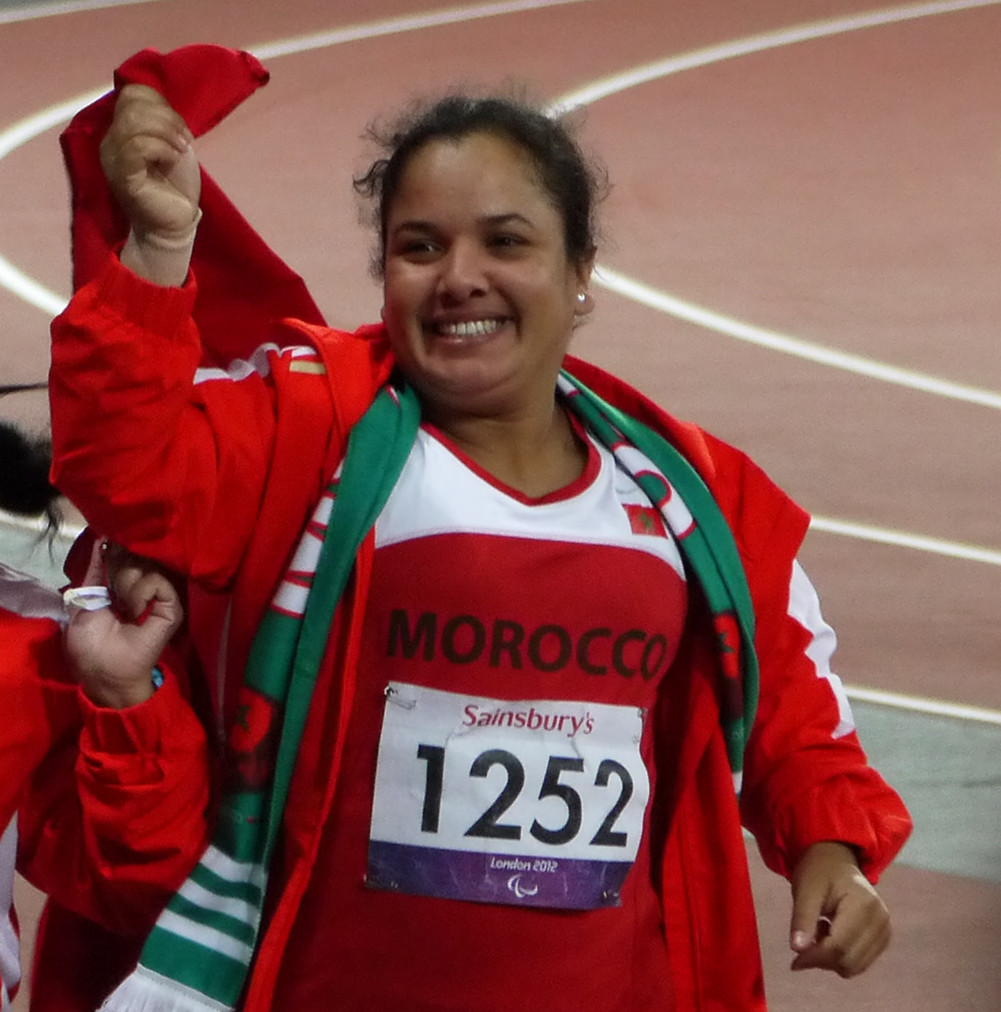

Personal information
- Years active: 2006–2024

Sport
- Disability class: F40
Medal record
Women's para athletics (F40)
Representing Morocco
Paralympic Games
| Gold medal – first place | 2012 London | Discus throw – F40 |
| Bronze medal – third place | 2012 London | Shot put – F40 |
| Bronze medal – third place | 2008 Beijing | Discus throw – F40 |

Najat El Garaa (Arabic: نجاة الكرعة) is a Paralympian athlete from Morocco competing mainly in category F40 athletics events.

== Career ==
El Garaa competed in the 2008 Summer Paralympics in Beijing, China. There she won a bronze medal in the women's F40 discus throw event.

She later competed in the 2012 Summer Paralympics in London where she won a gold medal in the women's F40 discus throw event. El Garaa made a new world record at 32.37 metres. She also achieved a bronze in F40 shot put.

El Garaa was declared Moroccan sportswoman of the year in 2012 and received Sheikh Mohamed Bin Rashid Al Maktoum's Creative Sports Award.

El Garaa also competed in the 2020 and 2024 Summer Paralympics, in powerlifting.

== Personal life ==
Her sisters Laila and Hayat are both Paralympic medalists.
