= Nonato (Paralympic footballer) =

Brazilian football-5-a-side player

Personal information
- Full name: Raimundo Nonato Alves Mendes
- Born: 19 August 1987 (age 38) Orocó, Pernambuco, Brazil

Sport
- Country: Brazil
- Sport: Blind football (5-a-side football)
Medal record
Men's Five-a-side football
Representing Brazil
Summer Paralympics
Gold medal – first place	2012 London	Men's
Gold medal – first place	2016 Rio de Janeiro	Men's
Gold medal – first place	2020 Tokyo	Men's
Bronze medal – third place	2024 Paris	Men's
Parapan American Games
Gold medal – first place	2015 Toronto	Men's
Gold medal – first place	2019 Lima	Men's
Gold medal – first place	2023 Santiago	Men's
World Blind Football Championships
Gold medal – first place	2014 Tokyo	Men's
Gold medal – first place	2018 Madrid	Men's
Bronze medal – third place	2023 Birmingham	Men's

Raimundo Nonato Alves Mendes (born 19 August 1987), simply known as Nonato is a Brazilian five-a-side football player.

== Career ==
Nonato was born blind due to congenital retinitis in the city of Orocó, Pernambuco. He started playing football for the blind at the age of 23. As his main achievements, Nonato was a three-time gold medalist for Brazil.

On 13 September 2024, Nonato had his feet immortalized in the Arena Pernambuco hall of fame, which features great footballers from the state such as Rivaldo, Ricardo Rocha and Manoel Tobias from futsal.

== Honours ==
Summer Paralympics

- Gold medal: 2012, 2016, 2020
- Bronze medal: 2024

Parapan American Games

- Gold medal: 2015, 2019, 2023

IBSA World Blind Football Championships

- Gold medal: 2014, 2018
- Bronze medal: 2023

IBSA Blind Football World Grand Prix

- Gold medal: 2022, 2023

IBSA Blind Football American Championships

- Gold medal: 2013, 2019
- Silver medal: 2022
