= Blind football in Australia =

- Country: Australia
- Governing body: Australian Blind Football
- National teams: Men's blind national team Men's partially sighted national team
- Clubs: Doncaster Rovers Soccer Club; FC Williamstown; Preston Lions Football Club; All Stars FC

Club competitions
- Victorian B-League Victorian B1 Championship

Blind football is played in Australia. The sport was introduced in the country in Victoria in 2014 as a result of Blind Sports Victoria creating a blind football development program. A regional blind football league was created in Victoria in 2015. The following year, the International Blind Sports Federation (IBSA) held a workshop in Melbourne, which was attended by representatives from blind sport organizations in New South Wales. Blind football continued to develop in 2017, governance of the sport was transferred to Blind Sports Australia who wanted to create a national team and develop the sport outside Victoria. That year also saw Australia get is first IBSA recognized blind football referees. In 2018, a talent development search took place in Sydney.

The Victorian B-League season started at Melbourne's Docklands in 2015, with two divisions. It was open to B1, B2, B3 and sighted players. The Grand Final in the inaugural season was between FC Williamstown and Preston Lions FC. With a final score of 3 - 1, FC Williamstown emerged as the winners.

National team development for both a blind (B1) and partially sighted (B2/B2) squads was underway in 2017 after Australian Blind Football took over governance of the sport. Michael Roski was named the head coach of the Australia men's national blind football team in June 2017.

== History ==
=== 2014 ===
Blind football was first played in Australia in 2014. It was introduced to the country by Blind Sports Victoria (BSV) who created a blind football development program.

In November Dave Connolly from Social Goal in Australia gave the IBSA an update on the development of blind football in Victoria, Australia. Connelly had been involved in the sport since 2013 and had attended that year's World Championships. Efforts to promote the sport that year included fund raising, an awareness-training session to skill up volunteers and an eight-week skill development program for 20 players. The IBSA quoted one player on the program who said "... I tell them I have been playing blind soccer they instantly ask me “how do you play it?” As people know soccer, they are intrigued and want to know more." On 7 December 2014, before an A-League game between Melbourne City Football Club and Brisbane Roar, a demonstration of the sport took place. During halftime, an abbreviated game of blind football took place as a demonstration.

=== 2015 ===
Blind Sports Victoria and Social Goal had a goal in 2015 to develop a "Victorian B League" for inclusive visually impaired football, with blind, visually impaired and sighted men and women all playing on the same team. They were working with Football Federation Victoria.

=== 2016 ===
No Australian referees or international officials were chosen to officiate matches at the 2016 Summer Paralympics for blind football. Instead, referees and their coordinator came from France, Argentina, Japan, Germany, Belgium, Great Britain and Greece. In August 2016, Melbourne, Australia hosted a blind football workshop at the Knox Regional Football Centre on the 7th. IBSA Football Chairman Ulrich Pfisterer served as the workshop facilitator. Australian players that participated included Prasantha Wijeyasiri. Blind Sports NSW was also officially represented as attendees of the event. The event lasted two days. It was run in partnership with Blind Sports & Recreation Victoria with support from the Victoria B League. Following this, the IBSA held a blind football workshop in Auckland, New Zealand.

=== 2017 ===
By 2017, the development of blind football in Australia had been taken over by Blind Sports Australia. They were working towards growing the sport in Victoria and other parts of the country. In early 2017, blind football education workshops and national team selection trials took place in Melbourne, Sydney, Perth and Adelaide. Around 60 footballers, coaches and officials took part in these events. Following these workshops, the Blind Sports Australia - Australian Blind Football was created in May 2017.

In June 2017, Australian Blind Football Coordinator Dave Connolly was quoted by the IBSA as saying, “It has taken a couple of years to get to this stage but it is an exciting time for blind football in Australia. While visiting states during the rollout of the national education program, I experienced first-hand the enthusiasm for the game. A number of players even put their hand up to see what they could do to support the development of the sport. It is great to see there is so much enthusiasm, some of the players have ambitious goals and we want to help them to achieve these goals. It is really important to acknowledge how blind football can be a game changer for people who are blind or vision impaired in Australia.” Vision impaired Australian sportsperson Matthew Cameron participated in the Sydney workshop. Following it, he was quoted by the IBSA as saying, “One thing I have always dreamed about is playing for my country in football. Now, that dream is within reach. After having to give up mainstream football due to my deteriorating vision I have been able to slip my goalkeeper gloves back on and do what I have always loved.”

In August 2017, Australia had pending IBSA recognized international B1 Blind Football referees, to be on the list after an official IBSA Football Referees Seminar. These were the first blind football referees from Australia.

=== 2018 ===
The first Australian international team was announced in preparation for matches in India and at the first Asian Blind Football Championships in 2019. The matches in India gave an opportunity for Shae Skinner to become the first Australian woman to compete in the sport internationally.

== Leagues ==
In September 2015, the Victorian B-League, the first adult blind football league, started at Melbourne's Docklands supported by Football Federation Victoria and Blind Sports and Recreation Victoria. The league had eight teams competing in two divisions. The first division included Doncaster Rovers Soccer Club, FC Williamstown, Preston Lions Football Club and All Stars FC who played in the Vision Impaired League. The league included B1, B2, B3 and sighted players. The second division was the B1 Championship. This league played using international blind football rules, but also allowed sighted players. In December the final was between FC Williamstown and Preston Lions FC. With a final score of 3 - 1, FC Williamstown came out victorious.

== National team ==
Australia has never had a ranked national men's blind football team in the three years of IBSA national team rankings. As of 2017, Blind Sports Australia was working towards developing national teams for form national teams in both B1 and B2/B3 forms.

Michael Roski was named the head coach of the Australia men's national blind football team in June 2017. Australian Blind Football Coordinator Dave Connolly was quoted by the IBSA as saying, “Michael has been involved in blind football activities in Melbourne for the past 18 months and has been instrumental in growing participation and awareness at a local level, while also assisting with a variety of activities during the national rollout. It’s great to have Michael on board in this role."

== See also ==
- Blind football in Cameroon
- Blind soccer
- Paralympic association football
