= IBSA Blind Football World Grand Prix =

The IBSA Blind Football World Grand Prix is an annual competition in blind football.

== History ==
The tournament of blind football was established in 2018 and held annually.

== Results ==
Year	Venue	Winners	Score	Runners-up	Third place	Score	Fourth place	Number of teams
2018; Details	(Japan); Tokyo	Argentina	0–0 (2–0 p)	England	Turkey	1–0	Russia	8
2019; Details	(Japan); Tokyo	Argentina	2–0	England	Spain	1–0	Japan	8
2020	(Japan); Tokyo	Cancelled due to COVID-19 pandemic			—N/a	—N/a	—N/a	—N/a
2021; Details	(Japan); Tokyo	Argentina	3–0	Japan	Spain	1–0	Thailand	5
2022; Details	(Mexico); Puebla	Brazil	0–0 (3–2 p)	Argentina	Mexico	0–0 (4–3 p)	Costa Rica	5
2023; Details	(Brazil); São Paulo	Brazil	2–0	Japan	Argentina	1–0	France	8

== See also ==
- World Blind Football Championships
- Blind football at the IBSA World Games
- IBSA Blind Football European Championships
- IBSA Blind Football Asian Championships
- Football 5-a-side at the Summer Paralympics
- Football 5-a-side at the Asian Para Games
