= Football in Argentina =

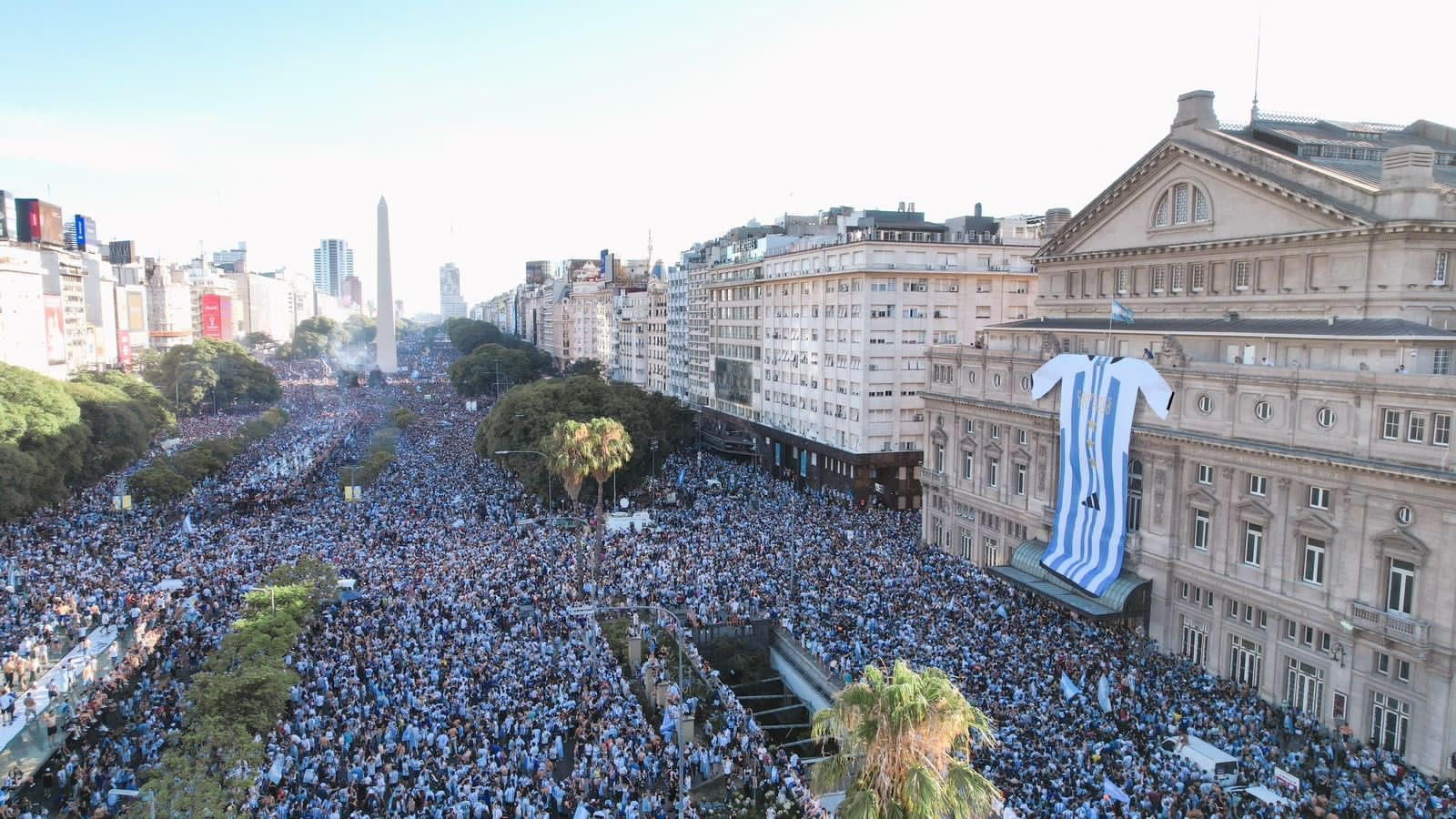
- Celebrations in Buenos Aires after Argentina won the 2022 FIFA World Cup
- Country: Argentina
- Governing body: AFA
- National team: Argentina
- First played: 1867; 159 years ago
- Registered players: 331,811
- Clubs: 3,377

National competitions
- FIFA World Cup; Copa América; Finalissima

Club competitions
- List: League: 1º Primera División 2º Primera Nacional 3º Primera B / Torneo Federal A 4º Primera C / Torneo Regional Federal 5º Torneo Promocional Amateur / Regional Leagues; Cups: Copa Argentina; Supercopa Argentina; Trofeo de Campeones; Supercopa Internacional

International competitions
- FIFA Club World Cup; FIFA Intercontinental Cup; Copa Libertadores; Copa Sudamericana; Recopa Sudamericana

Audience records
- Single match: 120,000 (Racing 2–1 Celtic at Avellaneda, 1967 Intercontinental Cup)
- Season: 106,000 (Racing 1–1 River Plate at Avellaneda, 1968 Nacional)

Football is the most popular sport in Argentina and part of the culture in the country. It is the one with the most players (2,658,811 total, 331,811 of which are registered and 2,327,000 unregistered; with 3,377 clubs and 37,161 officials, all according to FIFA) and is the most popular recreational sport, played from childhood into old age. The percentage of Argentines that declare allegiance to an Argentine football club is about 90%.

Football was introduced to Argentina in the latter half of the 19th century by the British immigrants in Buenos Aires. The first Argentine league was contested in 1891, making it the fifth-oldest recognised league of a FIFA member (after England, Scotland, Northern Ireland and the Netherlands). The Argentine Football Association (AFA) was formed in 1893 and is the eighth-oldest in the world.

The Argentina national team is one of the eight to have won the FIFA World Cup, having done so in 1978, 1986, and 2022, while being runner-up in 1930, 1990, 2014 and 2026. Argentina has also won the top continental tournament, the Copa América, 16 times, and the FIFA Confederations Cup in 1992. It also holds the record for having more official titles than any other nation with 23. The nation's Olympic representative has won two gold medals (in 2004 and 2008), while the under-20 team has won a record six U-20 World Cups. At club level, Argentine teams have won the most Intercontinental Cups (9) and the most Copa Libertadores (25).

Women's football has a national league since 1991, the Campeonato de Fútbol Femenino. In turn, the female national representative qualified for the World Cup for the first time in 2007 and won their first Campeonato Sudamericano Femenino (top continental competition) in 2006.

In futsal, Argentina were FIFUSA/AMF Futsal World Cup champions in 1994 and 2019. They also compete in the FIFA code of futsal, where they finished champions in 2016, runner-up in 2021 and fourth place in 2004. The team also won the FIFA Futsal Copa América in 2003, 2015 and 2022. Moreover, Argentina was world champion in futsal for the visually impaired in 2002, 2006 and 2023, and also won the gold medal at the IBSA World Blind Games 2015, a silver medal (2004) and two Bronze (2008 and 2016) in the Paralympic Games, three runner-up world championships (1998, 2000 and 2014), three championships of the Copa América (1999, 2005, 2017), three silver medals in the Parapan American Games (2007, 2011, 2015) and two runner-up finishes in the Copa América (2009 and 2013).

Argentina also compete in the beach football World Cup, where their best finish was third in 2001.

== History ==
=== The beginning ===
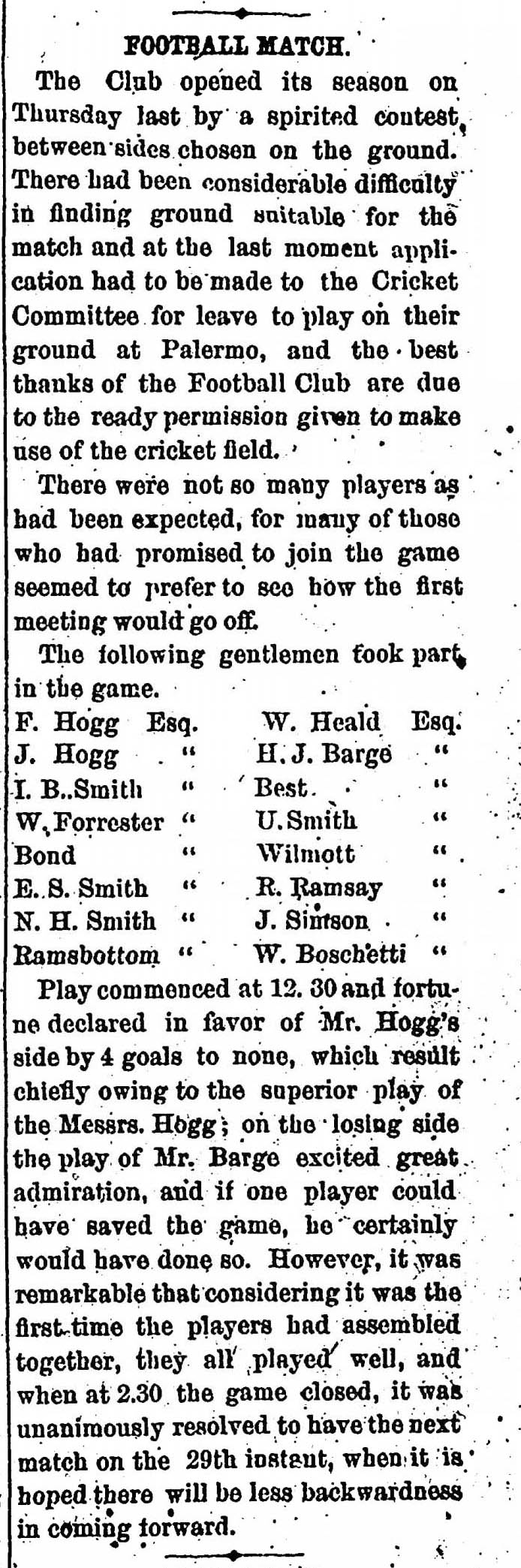
The first football match played in Argentina, as covered by The Standard, June 1867

By 1867, there was a large British community in Buenos Aires. Most of them had established themselves in Argentina coming from the United Kingdom as managers and workers of the British-owned railway companies that operated in Argentina. British citizens founded social and sports clubs where they could practise their sports, such as bowls, cricket, football, golf, horse riding, rugby union and tennis amongst others.

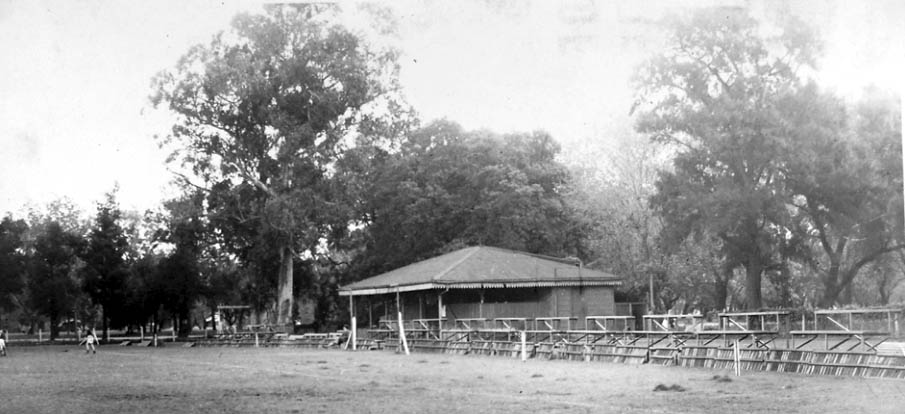
The Buenos Aires Cricket Club Ground in Palermo, Buenos Aires held the first football match on 20 June 1867

Two English immigrants, Thomas and James Hogg, organized a meeting on 9 May 1867 in Buenos Aires where the Buenos Aires Football Club was founded. The club was given permission by the Buenos Aires Cricket Club to make use of the cricket field in Parque Tres de Febrero, Palermo, Buenos Aires, on the site now occupied by the Galileo Galilei planetarium. The first recorded football match in Argentina took place on this pitch on 20 June 1867, being covered by English language daily newspaper The Standard. This newspaper, published in Argentina, was the first one to cover football matches in the country. That first match, originally scheduled for May 25 in La Boca, had to be postponed due to bad weather.

=== Early 20th. century ===
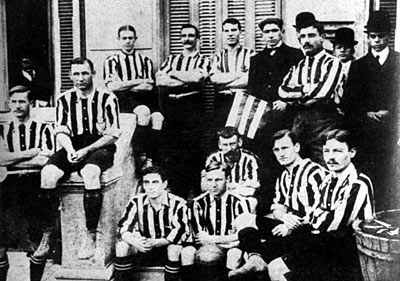
Team of Alumni that defeated South Africa in 1906. The Southafricans were one of several British teams that toured Argentina in the 20th. century

The most successful and admired team of this early period was Alumni, founded by graduates and students of Watson Hutton's English High School. Like all of the early clubs, it was composed mainly of British players.

Towards the end of the 19th century, the game became increasingly popular amongst other European immigrants, especially Italians.

British football clubs tours of South America contributed to the spread and development of football in Argentina during the first years of the 20th century. The first club to tour the country was Southampton F.C. in 1904, who were captained by George Molyneaux. They beat the Buenos Aires High School Alumni team 3-0 with Molyneaux remarking on 'how far the Argentines were ahead of their European counterparts in France and Denmark.' Several other teams came afterwards (mainly from England although some Scottish clubs also visited South America), until 1929 with Chelsea F.C. being the last team to tour.

In 1916, Argentina competed in the first Copa América which was won by Uruguay. Argentina would win the tournament for the first time in 1921, and have gone on to win it a total of 16 times.

=== Consolidation ===
During the 1920s decade, Huracan was a strong competitor, winning most of the annual championships, as Racing Club did during the 1910s. To mention a tradition, the Huracán footballers and fans used to meet at the historical Japanese Cafe.

In 1928, Argentina Olympic football team competed at the 1928 Olympics in Amsterdam, where they finished runners-up to Uruguay. Two years later, they competed in the first FIFA World Cup, again finishing runners up to hosts Uruguay.

Following two seasons of disrupted play due to mass cancellation and suspension of matches and the mid-season withdrawal of teams in the 1929, and 1930, 18 teams decided to form a breakaway professional league for the 1931 season. The amateur league carried on in parallel until it folded in 1934 with many of the teams joining the new professional second division The creation of the professional league helped curb the exodus of Argentine talent to high paying European football clubs. The 1934 World Cup Italy national team championship side featured several Oriundo in the squad composed of Argentine-born players such as Raimundo Orsi, Enrique Guaita, and Luis Monti who also played for Argentina in the 1930 World Cup.

In 1964, Independiente became the first Argentine club to win the Copa Libertadores, Argentine clubs have won the competition a total of 25 times.

In 1967, Racing became the first Argentine team to win the Intercontinental Cup. Argentine clubs have won the tournament a record 9 times.

In 1971, Rosario Central became the first club not based in Buenos Aires or Greater Buenos Aires to win the First Division League, after winning this year´s Nacional championship.

In 1978, Argentina hosted the World Cup, where the team defeated the Netherlands 3–1 after extra time in the final to win their first World Cup.

In 1979, a young Diego Maradona was part of the Argentina under-20 team which won the FIFA Under-20 World Cup. Argentina have gone on to win a record six U-20 World Cups.

In 1982, due to an uncertain political atmosphere and an extremely unstable government with multiple presidents over the span of a short time, most football clubs were lacking the money to keep top domestic players. 1982 saw a whole slew of players leave Argentina for Europe: players like Diego Maradona, Mario Kempes (who had already played in Spain and had briefly returned to Argentina), Daniel Passarella and many others leave for Spain, France, Italy or England.

In 1986, Argentina would win their second World Cup in the 1986 World Cup, where the team defeated to Germany 3–2.

In 1995, Rosario Central became the first club not based in Buenos Aires or Greater Buenos Aires to win an international cup recognised by FIFA, the Conmebol Cup. Argentine clubs have won the tournament a record three times.

In 2004, the Argentina Olympic football team won Gold at the Athens Olympic games; they defended their title in 2008 to become the first team to defend the Olympic football title since Hungary in 1968.

In 2022, Argentina won the World Cup for the third time, beating France 4–2 on penalties following a 3–3 draw after extra time.

== Clubs ==
=== League system ===
Around 520 registered football clubs play in the Argentine Football Association (AFA) league system, which is organized in a pyramid of seven leagues divided from the third level between clubs directly affiliated to AFA (es) and clubs indirectly affiliated to AFA (es). In the branch of clubs indirectly affiliated to AFA below the fourth level, there are 250 other Regional Leagues that are affiliated with AFA and compete for the right to enter the league system at the lowest tier.

The Primera División is the highest level of club football in Argentina. It was founded in 1891 as an amateur competition, becoming professional in 1931 with a league by 18 teams which were dissatisfied with the amateur system they were participating on until 1930. This group of 18 founding members of the present league included nearly all of the most prominent clubs of those times, unified by the idea that full and compulsory amateurism was no longer sustainable (many of those teams are still today among the most popular clubs in Argentina). For many years, the only winners were the so-called "big five" (Boca Juniors, Independiente, Racing Club, River Plate and San Lorenzo de Almagro). This dominance was finally broken in 1967 by Estudiantes de La Plata. Since then, ten other teams have won the championship, resulting in a total of 30 teams having been champions of Argentina as of 2026. River Plate has won the most championships with 38. The only teams outside the Buenos Aires and Greater Buenos Aires to have won the championship are Rosario Central and Newell's Old Boys from Rosario, Estudiantes and Gimnasia y Esgrima from La Plata and Belgrano from Córdoba.

Below the second division, Primera Nacional, the league system is regionalized with three divisions for clubs directly affiliated to AFA (es) of Buenos Aires, Greater Buenos Aires and twenty-two clubs from the cities of Rosario, Santa Fe, La Plata, Zarate, Campana, Luján, Junín, General Rodríguez, Cañuelas, Pilar and Mercedes; and two divisions for clubs indirectly affiliated to AFA (es) that cover the rest of the country. Even below these seven leagues, Argentine football is regionalized into almost 250 Regional Leagues, which consist of teams that participate in championships and tournaments organized by the Consejo Federal del Fútbol Argentino (es) (CFFA), internal organ of the Argentine Football Association (AFA), to obtain the right to enter the Torneo Regional Federal Amateur, established in 2018.

=== League championships ===
The Primera División has been using different formats for its championships, from a double round-robin tournament (1891 to 1966) to a single round-robin that would become the standard in Latin America, the Apertura and Clausura. In the particular case of Argentina, the Apertura was contested in the second half of the calendar year, and the Clausura was played in the first half of the following year (in order to synchronize the seasons with those of the European football). Different formats used also included the organization of Metropolitano and Nacional championships, that lasted from 1967 to 1985.

As of 2026 season, the Argentine Primera División league is made up of 30 teams, with a championship organized in a single round-robin schedule, resulting in a total of 27 rounds per team. Six teams from Argentina are eligible to play the Copa Libertadores, four from the league championship and the rest from the Copa Argentina and Copa de la Liga Profesional. The following six teams in the general table of the league championship are eligible to play the Copa Sudamericana.

From 1891 to date, River Plate is the most winning team with 38 domestic championships, followed by Boca Juniors with 36 titles. Racing holds the third position with 18 titles.

=== Domestic cups ===
Since the creation of the first league in 1891, several cups have been played in Argentine apart from the main competition, the Primera División. The first cup held in the country was the Copa de Honor Municipalidad de Buenos Aires; first contested in 1905, it was played until 1936.

As of the present, four domestic cups are held in Argentina: the Copa Argentina, that includes teams of all divisions of Argentine football, and the Supercopa Argentina –contested by the reigning champions of Primera División and Copa Argentina, organised by the AFA. The third and fourth one are the Copa de la Liga Profesional and Trofeo de Campeones, both organised by the Liga Profesional de Fútbol body. The annual football match was played for the first time in 2019, being played by the champions of Primera División and Copa de la Superliga Argentina respectively.

The Copa Campeonato, originally awarded to Primera División champion, is the oldest trophy of Argentine football, having been established in 1896, three year after the AFA was created, and played without interruption until 1926. The Cup received several names, such as "Championship Cup", "Copa Campeonato", "Challenge Cup" and "Copa Alumni", due to the association offered legendary team Alumni to keep the Cup definitely for having won it three consecutive times (1900–02), but the club from Belgrano declined the honour to keep the trophy under dispute.

All those competitions, although not considered league tournaments, are regarded as official titles.

=== Rivalries ===
There are many local rivalries in Argentine football. The most important is the Superderby, which is contested between Argentina's two most popular and successful teams, Buenos Aires rivals River Plate and Boca Juniors. The English newspaper The Observer put the superclásico (name in Spanish) at the top of their list of "The 50 Sporting Things You Must Do Before You Die".

The second-most important rivalry in Argentine football is the Avellaneda derby, which is contested between Independiente and Racing, the third- and fourth-most popular and third- and fourth-most successful teams of the country (respectively), both from the city of Avellaneda (located next to Buenos Aires, into it metropolitan area). Other important derbies include the derby between Huracán and San Lorenzo de Almagro (has no particular denomination), the Rosario derby (between Newell's Old Boys and Rosario Central), the La Plata derby (between Estudiantes de La Plata and Gimnasia y Esgrima La Plata), the West derby (between Ferro Carril Oeste and Vélez Sarsfield), the derby between Atlanta and Chacarita Juniors (formerly denominated "Villa Crespo derby"), the Santa Fe derby (between Colón and Unión), the North Zone derby (between Platense and Tigre), the Cordoba derby (between Belgrano and Talleres), the derby between Instituto and Racing de Córdoba (has no particular denomination) and the Tucuman derby (between San Martín and Atlético Tucumán).

=== Oldest clubs ===
Note: Only clubs that are currently affiliated to AFA are listed.

#	Club	City	Founded	Ref.
1	Mercedes	Mercedes	1875	
2	Gimnasia y Esgrima (LP)	La Plata	Jun 1887	
3	Quilmes	Quilmes	Nov 1887	
4	Rosario Central	Rosario	1889	
5	Banfield	Banfield	1896	
6	Estudiantes (BA)	Caseros	1898	
7	Argentino de Quilmes	Quilmes	1899	

Additional notes

- Some clubs that have a football section but do not participate in official competitions (such as Atlético del Rosario or C.A. San Isidro among others) are not included.
- Lobos A.C. (est. 1892) is the 4th. oldest club but it is not currently affiliated to the Association. The club had been disaffiliated in 1899 after AFA ruled that clubs could not have a venue distant more from 30 kms to the city of Buenos Aires.

=== Style of play ===
Circumstances allowed the wide development of a special style, called "pasture football", little regulated, often massive, without coaches, captains or parents. This includes a variety of football games, from more or less formal matches, to mass informal matches such as "el picado", or games such as "goal-goal-enter", the "loco", the "run", the " center-goal ", the" cañito-la liga ", the" football-tennis ", the" coca-cola ", the" head ", and so on. These conditions promoted a game based fundamentally on improvisation and individual skill in handling the ball, the so-called "art of dribbling" (dribbling), and the short pass, as well as a more physical and violent defensive game, with resource systematic to the old law of British premodern football, "hacking" or trip, known in the Río de la Plata as "ax".

=== Clubs at international competitions ===
The first international club competition was organized by both, Argentine and Uruguayan associations, with the establishment of Tie Cup or "Copa de Competencia Chevallier Boutell" in 1900. The tournament was held until 1919. Several competitions between teams from both countries followed, being the last the Copa Aldao, which last edition was played in 1955.

The most successful Argentine club on the international stage is Boca Juniors. The club has won a total of 22 international titles. Three of its wins are the Intercontinental Cup titles of 1977, 2000 and 2003.

Independiente has won the most important continental title on the most occasions, its seven Copa Libertadores titles is a record, as is its feat of winning the title on four consecutive occasions (1972–75). Also, Independiente was the most successful club on international cups by more than twenty years. These achievements earned them the nickname of Rey de Copas (King of Cups).

A number of other Argentine clubs have won the Copa Libertadores, including Estudiantes de La Plata and River Plate (four times each; Estudiantes in 1968, 1969, 1970, 2009 and River Plate in 1986, 1996, 2015, 2018), Racing (1967), Argentinos Juniors (1985), Vélez Sarsfield (1994) and San Lorenzo (2014).

Some Argentine teams have won international titles without having won a Primera División title, such as Talleres de Córdoba that won the Copa CONMEBOL in 1999, Arsenal de Sarandí winning the Copa Sudamericana in 2007 (although the team then won a title, the 2012 Torneo Clausura) and Defensa y Justicia winning the Copa Sudamericana in 2020.

==== List of international competitions (1900–present) ====
Argentine clubs have taken part of the following international club competitions, in order of appearance:

Competition	Years	Organiser/s
Tie Cup	1900–1919	AFA / AUF
Copa de Honor Cousenier	1905–1920	AFA / AUF
Copa Aldao	1913–1955	AFA / AUF
Copa Libertadores	1960–present	CONMEBOL
Intercontinental Cup	1960–2004	CONMEBOL / UEFA / FIFA
Copa Interamericana	1968–1998	CONMEBOL / CONCACAF
Intercontinental Supercup	1968–1970	CONMEBOL / UEFA
Supercopa Libertadores	1988–1997	CONMEBOL
Recopa Sudamericana	1989–present	CONMEBOL
Copa Master de Supercopa	1992–1995	CONMEBOL
Copa Conmebol	1992–1999	CONMEBOL
Copa de Oro	1993–1996	CONMEBOL
Copa Mercosur	1998–2001	CONMEBOL
Copa Sudamericana	2002–present	CONMEBOL
FIFA Club World Cup	2005–present	FIFA
J.League Cup / Copa Sudamericana Championship	2008–2019	CONMEBOL / J.League
FIFA Intercontinental Cup	2024–present	FIFA

== Culture ==
Football plays an important part in the life of many Argentines. Even those supporters who usually do not attend the matches watch them on television and comment on them the next day with friends and co-workers. When the Argentina national football team plays (especially during world cup matches), streets tend to look completely deserted as everyone is watching the match.

But before that in the 1920s is when the culture around Argentina's men's football team started and it had something this to do with the mass media boom during that time. With the mass media boom and having the first generation of immigrant children born, the Argentina government decided to use the Argentina's men's football team as way to establish a connection with them and the country so they could be proud of their nationality. So the media wrote that the team played so well and has created its nation team style and with its attention grabbing headlines reached a very wide audience. With this style it continued and by October 1924 it ranked third in Buenos Aires many daily's. By then end of the decade it was selling 300,000 copies a day. And their way of reporting on football had a big effect on these statistics. According to "National Identity in the Sports Pages: Football and the Mass Media in 1920s Buenos Aires" by Matthew B. Karush.

It was in 1986 when the figure of Diego Maradona became well known internationally beyond the scope of just football. In Argentina, Maradona became a cultural icon.

Supporters in Argentine football stadiums operate under a key principle known as Aguante (Endurance) which serves as a belief system that guides the behavior of those in attendance. Key values that make up aguante that scholars such as Eduardo Herrera have also claimed are central in the construction of Argentine masculinity are courage, endurance, and fearlessness in physical confrontation. Fans can showcase these values when they are at stadiums in three significant way which are always supporting your team with your participation in chants and jumping throughout the match, attending literally every match that your team plays regardless of the circumstances, and standing your ground in the face of opposition insults or when engaged in any physical altercations at the stadium. It is under this principal of aguante that those in attendance of stadium matches in Argentina can be labeled under three broad categories which are hinchas (Fans), hinchinda militantes (militant fans), and espectadores (spectator). Those who classified as Hinchas exhibit many of the qualities under the aguante principle and often go to many of their team's matches, while hinchinda militantes who are usually found behind the goals with their team colors strictly follow what is asked of them under aguante by attending every one of their team's matches regardless of the weather or performance of the team. The espectadores attend matches to enjoy the play of the game but do not weigh the principal of aguante close to heart compared the other two fan categories. Within the broad category of hinchinda militantes it is made up of la barra (supporters), la banda (the band), los pibes (the kids), and la pandilla (gang). La Barra is the central figure within the hinchinda militantes because of the critical role these subgroups of fans have in shaping the atmosphere of the stadium during matches and lead under a hierarchical structure with a capo (boss) at the top who organizes and tropes(followers) who heed the direction/instructions of the capo. The leadership of these organized subgroups of fans, which are mainly made up of men between the ages of 15–50 years old, are entirely driven by demonstrations of aguante and awarded additional benefits stemming from relationships with club executives that grant special privileges to these groups such as tickets or allowing them to bring in typically prohibited items into the stadium to stir energy and excitement for the football club during the match. The excitement and passion at stadiums are typically found to be instigated and sustained by the presence of the percussion and brass instrument brought in by barras groups. The typical percussion instruments that are brought in and played by members of the barras at stadiums are the bombo con platillo (bass drum), Brazilian surdo drums, redoblantes (snare drums), repiques, scrappers, tambourines, cowbells, and agogo bells. The brass instruments that are typically played at stadiums by outside musicians hired by barras groups are trumpets, trombones, and euphoniums. While the collective energy and synchronization incited by the music can create a sense of unity among attendants and supporters alike, ethnomusicological scholar Eduardo Herrera also believes that they can embolden individuals to normalize discriminatory behavior that they wouldn't otherwise do if they weren't in a crowd, which would explain some of the recorded derogatory language and violent behavior found in Argentine stadiums.

Argentine fans are not allowed to travel to see their teams in away matches, as they have been banned since 2013.

Hinchas (supporters) create an emotional ambiance in many stadiums, singing and cheering loudly all game long, but since the away fan ban due to violence, the atmosphere in many stadia has become less emotional, with goals for away teams greeted by silence and the disappearance of round trip chants between home and away fans, that provoked in each side to sing louder for show more passion.

Barra bravas (Argentine organized groups – like the English hooligan firms) also create occasional problems, usually in riots after the match.

== Major football stadiums ==
The major 50,000 plus capacity stadiums in the country are (in brackets, the owner/home team and its capacity): Mâs Monumental (River Plate – 84,567 spectators), La Bombonera (Boca Juniors – 57,200), Mario Kempes (owned by the Córdoba Province – 57,000), El Cilindro (Racing – 55,880) and Ciudad de La Plata (owned by the Buenos Aires Province – 53,000).

Stadiums with 45,000 plus capacity include José Amalfitani (Vélez Sársfield – 49,540), Tomás Adolfo Ducó (Huracán – 48,314), Pedro Bidegain (San Lorenzo – 47,964), Ciudad de Lanús (Lanús – 47,090), and Estadio Gigante de Arroyito (Rosario Central– 47,000)

== Most successful clubs overall ==
Club	Domestic Titles							South America Titles								Intercontinental Titles			Overall titles
Club	L	CA	SA	TCLP	SI	Other national titles (Note: Includes: Copa de Competencia Chevallier Boutell; Copa de Honor; Copa de Competencia Jockey Club; Copa Dr. Carlos Ibarguren; Copa de Competencia La Nación; Copa de Competencia de la Asociación Amateurs; Copa Estímulo; Campeonato Porteño; Copa de Competencia de la Liga Argentina; Copa Beccar Varela; Copa Escobar; Copa de la República; Copa de Competencia Británica; Copa Juan Domingo Perón; Copa Suecia; Copa Centenario; Copa Campeonato Copa del Bicentenario; Copa de la Superliga; Trofeo de Campeones de la Superliga; Copa de la Liga Profesional.)	Total	CL	CS / CM / CC	RS	SL	CO / CMS	CSC	CEG / CA / CHC / TC / CCRP	Total	IC	CI	Total	Overall titles
Boca Juniors	36	4	2	-	-	11	53	6	2	4	1	2	-	4	19	3	-	3	75
River Plate	38	3	3	2	-	8	54	4	1	3	1	-	1	6	16	1	1	2	72
Independiente	16	-	-	-	-	9	25	7	2	1	2	-	1	2	15	2	3	5	45
Racing	18	-	-	1	1	13	33	1	1	1	1	-	-	3	7	1	-	1	41
San Lorenzo	15	-	1	-	-	1	17	1	2	-	-	-	-	2	5	-	-	-	22
Alumni	10	-	-	-	-	8	18	-	-	-	-	-	-	4	4	-	-	-	22
Estudiantes (LP)	7	1	-	2	-	3	13	4	-	-	-	-	-	-	4	1	1	2	19
Vélez Sarsfield	11	-	2	-	1	-	14	1	-	1	1	-	-	-	3	1	1	2	19
Rosario Central	5	1	-	-	1	6	13	-	1	-	-	-	-	-	1	-	-	-	14
Huracán	5	1	1	-	-	6	13	-	-	-	-	-	-	-	-	-	-	-	13
Newell's Old Boys	6	-	-	-	-	3	9	-	-	-	-	-	-	-	-	-	-	-	9
Lanús	2	-	1	-	-	2	5	-	3	-	-	-	-	-	3	-	-	-	8
Belgrano Athletic	3	-	-	-	-	2	5	-	-	-	-	-	-	1	1	-	-	-	6
Lomas Athletic	6	-	-	-	-	-	6	-	-	-	-	-	-	-	-	-	-	-	6
Argentinos Juniors	3	-	-	-	-	-	3	1	-	-	-	-	-	-	1	-	1	1	5
Arsenal	1	1	1	-	-	-	3	-	1	-	-	-	1	-	2	-	-	-	5
San Isidro	-	-	-	-	-	4	4	-	-	-	-	-	-	1	1	-	-	-	5
Porteño	2	-	-	-	-	2	4	-	-	-	-	-	-	-	-	-	-	-	4
Quilmes	2	-	-	-	-	1	3	-	-	-	-	-	-	-	-	-	-	-	3
Rosario Athletic	-	-	-	-	-	3	3	-	-	-	-	-	-	-	-	-	-	-	3
Defensa y Justicia	-	-	-	-	-	-	0	-	1	1	-	-	-	-	2	-	-	-	2
Talleres (C)	-	-	-	-	1	-	1	-	1	-	-	-	-	-	1	-	-	-	2
Estudiantil Porteño	2	-	-	-	-	-	2	-	-	-	-	-	-	-	-	-	-	-	2
Ferro Carril Oeste	2	-	-	-	-	-	2	-	-	-	-	-	-	-	-	-	-	-	2
Banfield	1	-	-	-	-	1	2	-	-	-	-	-	-	-	-	-	-	-	2
Gimnasia y Esgrima (LP)	1	-	-	-	-	1	2	-	-	-	-	-	-	-	-	-	-	-	2
Sportivo Barracas	1	-	-	-	-	1	2	-	-	-	-	-	-	-	-	-	-	-	2
Belgrano (C)	1	-	-	-	-	-	1	-	-	-	-	-	-	-	-	-	-	-	1
Chacarita Juniors	1	-	-	-	-	-	1	-	-	-	-	-	-	-	-	-	-	-	1
Dock Sud	1	-	-	-	-	-	1	-	-	-	-	-	-	-	-	-	-	-	1
Old Caledonians	1	-	-	-	-	-	1	-	-	-	-	-	-	-	-	-	-	-	1
Platense	1	-	-	-	-	-	1	-	-	-	-	-	-	-	-	-	-	-	1
St. Andrew's	1	-	-	-	-	-	1	-	-	-	-	-	-	-	-	-	-	-	1
Central Córdoba (SdE)	-	1	-	-	-	-	1	-	-	-	-	-	-	-	-	-	-	-	1
Independiente Rivadavia	-	1	-	-	-	-	1	-	-	-	-	-	-	-	-	-	-	-	1
Patronato	-	1	-	-	-	-	1	-	-	-	-	-	-	-	-	-	-	-	1
Atlanta	-	-	-	-	-	1	1	-	-	-	-	-	-	-	-	-	-	-	1
Central Córdoba (R)	-	-	-	-	-	1	1	-	-	-	-	-	-	-	-	-	-	-	1
Colón	-	-	-	-	-	1	1	-	-	-	-	-	-	-	-	-	-	-	1
Estudiantes (BA)	-	-	-	-	-	1	1	-	-	-	-	-	-	-	-	-	-	-	1
Nueva Chicago	-	-	-	-	-	1	1	-	-	-	-	-	-	-	-	-	-	-	1
San Martín (T)	-	-	-	-	-	1	1	-	-	-	-	-	-	-	-	-	-	-	1
Sportivo Balcarce	-	-	-	-	-	1	1	-	-	-	-	-	-	-	-	-	-	-	1
Tigre	-	-	-	-	-	1	1	-	-	-	-	-	-	-	-	-	-	-	1
Tiro Federal (R)	-	-	-	-	-	1	1	-	-	-	-	-	-	-	-	-	-	-	1
Liga Cordobesa de Fútbol	-	-	-	-	-	1	1	-	-	-	-	-	-	-	-	-	-	-	1
Liga Cultural (SdE)	-	-	-	-	-	1	1	-	-	-	-	-	-	-	-	-	-	-	1
Liga Mendocina de Fútbol	-	-	-	-	-	1	1	-	-	-	-	-	-	-	-	-	-	-	1

== Attendances ==
The average attendance per top-flight football league season and the club with the highest average attendance:

Season	League average	Best club	Best club average
2025	32,255	River Plate	84,782
2024	27,745	River Plate	83,754
2023	28,592	River Plate	84,742
2018-19	19,988	Boca Juniors	44,712
2016	18,798	River Plate	50,814
2015	18,453	River Plate	45,732
2013-14	17,709	Boca Juniors	40,600

Sources: League pages on Wikipedia

== See also ==
- English Argentines
- Sport in Argentina
