= 2023 IBSA Men's World Blind Football Championship =

2023 IBSA World Blind Football Championship
Tournament details
- Host country: United Kingdom, England
- Dates: August 15 to 25
- Teams: 16 (from 5 confederations)
- Venue(s): Birmingham (in 1 host city)

Final positions
- Champions: Argentina (3rd title)
- Runners-up: China
- Third place: Brazil
- Fourth place: Colombia

Tournament statistics
- Top scorer(s): Paul Yobo (Italy)
- Best player(s): Maximiliano Espinillo (Argentina)
- Fair play award: Thailand

The 2023 IBSA World Blind Football Championship was a blind football tournament and the eighth World Blind Football Championships. The competition was staged in Birmingham between 15 and 25 August 2023, and involved sixteen teams of visually impaired players from around the world competing to be crowned world champion, and was won for the third time by Argentina. The competition was first held as part of the IBSA World Games.

== Group stage ==
=== Group A ===
Pos	Team	Pld	W	D	L	GF	GA	GD	Pts	Qualification
1	Italy	3	2	1	0	6	4	+2	7	Quarter-finals
2	Japan	3	2	1	0	3	1	+2	7	Quarter-finals
3	Thailand	3	0	1	2	2	4	−2	1	9th–12th place
4	Turkey	3	0	1	2	1	3	−2	1	13th–16th place

Source: blindfootball.sport
15 August 2023

Italy	1–1	Japan

15 August 2023

Thailand	0–0	Turkey

17 August 2023

Thailand	0–1	Japan

17 August 2023

Turkey	1–2	Italy

19 August 2023

Japan	1–0	Turkey

19 August 2023

Italy	3–2	Thailand

=== Group B ===
Pos	Team	Pld	W	D	L	GF	GA	GD	Pts	Qualification
1	China	3	2	1	0	3	0	+3	7	Quarter-finals
2	Argentina	3	1	2	0	2	0	+2	5	Quarter-finals
3	Germany	3	1	0	2	1	4	−3	3	9th–12th place
4	England (H)	3	0	1	2	0	2	−2	1	13th–16th place

Source: blindfootball.sport
(H) Hosts
15 August 2023

England	0–1	Germany

15 August 2023

Argentina	0–0	China

17 August 2023

Argentina	0–0	England

17 August 2023

China	2–0	Germany

19 August 2023

England	0–1	China

19 August 2023

Germany	0–2	Argentina

=== Group C ===
Pos	Team	Pld	W	D	L	GF	GA	GD	Pts	Qualification
1	Colombia	3	2	1	0	10	1	+9	7	Quarter-finals
2	France	3	2	1	0	11	3	+8	7	Quarter-finals
3	Spain	3	1	0	2	8	7	+1	3	9th–12th place
4	Mali	3	0	0	3	0	18	−18	0	13th–16th place

Source: blindfootball.sport
16 August 2023

Colombia	3–0	Spain

16 August 2023

France	6–0	Mali

18 August 2023

France	1–1	Colombia

18 August 2023

Spain	6–0	Mali

20 August 2023

Mali	0–6	Colombia

20 August 2023

Spain	2–4	France

=== Group D ===
Pos	Team	Pld	W	D	L	GF	GA	GD	Pts	Qualification
1	Brazil	3	2	1	0	2	0	+2	7	Quarter-finals
2	Iran	3	1	1	1	2	2	0	4	Quarter-finals
3	Morocco	3	1	0	2	3	2	+1	3	9th–12th place
4	Mexico	3	0	2	1	1	4	−3	2	13th–16th place

Source: blindfootball.sport
16 August 2023

Iran	0–1	Brazil

16 August 2023

Mexico	0–3	Morocco

18 August 2023

Mexico	1–1	Iran

18 August 2023

Morocco	0–1	Brazil

20 August 2023

Iran	1–0	Morocco

20 August 2023

Brazil	0–0	Mexico

== Knockout stage ==
=== Main tournament ===
Quarterfinals
1A	Italy	0
2B	Argentina	1
1C	Colombia	1
2D	Iran	0
1B	China	2
2A	Japan	1
1D	Brazil	1
2C	France	0

Semifinals
Q1	Argentina	3
Q2	Colombia	1
Q3	China (p)	0 (2)
Q4	Brazil	0 (0)

Finals
S1	Argentina (p)	0 (2)
S2	China	0 (1)
Third place
L1	Colombia	1
L2	Brazil	7

=== 5th–8th place ===
Semifinals
L1	Italy	1 (2)
L2	Iran (p)	1 (3)
L3	Japan	2
L4	France	0

5th place
W1	Iran	0
W2	Japan	1
7th place
L1	Italy	1
L2	France	2

=== 9th–12th place ===
Semifinals
3A	Thailand	1
3B	Germany	0
3C	Spain	0 (0)
3D	Morocco (p)	0 (1)

9th place
W1	Thailand (p)	1 (3)
W2	Morocco	1 (2)
11th place
L1	Germany	1
L2	Spain	0

=== 13th–16th place ===
Semifinals
4A	Turkey	0 (1)
4B	England (p)	0 (2)
4C	Mali	0
4D	Mexico	6

13th place
W1	England	1
W2	Mexico	0
15th place
L1	Turkey	6
L2	Mali	0

== Final ranking ==
Place	Team
1st place, gold medalist(s)	Argentina
2nd place, silver medalist(s)	China
3rd place, bronze medalist(s)	Brazil
4	Colombia
5	Japan
6	Iran
7	France
8	Italy
9	Thailand
10	Morocco
11	Germany
12	Spain
13	England
14	Mexico
15	Turkey
16	Mali

== See also ==
- 2023 IBSA World Games
- Blind football at the IBSA World Games
