= Football 5-a-side classification =

Disability football classification

Football 5-a-side classification is the classification system governing Football 5-a-side. Football players with a disability are classified into different categories based on their disability type. The classification is handled by the International Blind Sports Association.

== Definition ==
The blind classifications are based on medical classification, no functional classification.

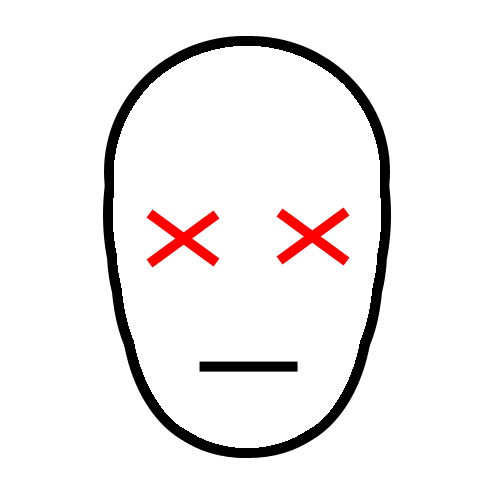
Visualisation of functional vision for a B1 competitor

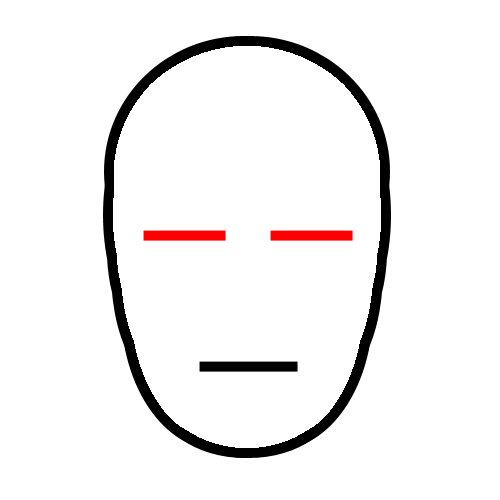
Visualisation of functional vision for a B2 competitor

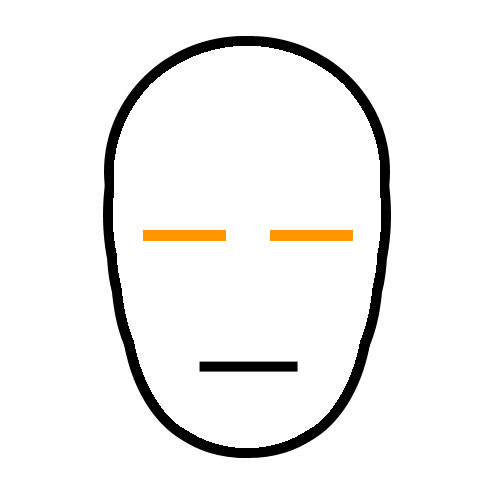
Visualisation of functional vision for a B3 competitor

== Governance ==
The sport is governed by the International Blind Sports Association.

== Eligibility ==
As of 2012, people with visual disabilities are eligible to compete in this sport. The sport is only open to men at the Paralympic Games.

== Sports ==
To ensure parity on the pitch, all players wear blindfolds.

== Process ==
For Australian competitors in this sport, the sport is not supported by the Australian Paralympic Committee. There are three types of classification available for Australian competitors: Provisional, national and international. The first is for club level competitions, the second for state and national competitions, and the third for international competitions.

== At the Paralympic Games ==
For the 2016 Summer Paralympics in Rio, the International Paralympic Committee had a zero classification at the Games policy. This policy was put into place in 2014, with the goal of avoiding last minute changes in classes that would negatively impact athlete training preparations. All competitors needed to be internationally classified with their classification status confirmed prior to the Games, with exceptions to this policy being dealt with on a case-by-case basis. In case there was a need for classification or reclassification at the Games despite best efforts otherwise, football 5-a-side classification was scheduled for September 4 to 6 at the Paralympic Village.

== Future ==
Going forward, disability sport's major classification body, the International Paralympic Committee, is working on improving classification to be more of an evidence-based system as opposed to a performance-based system so as not to punish elite athletes whose performance makes them appear in a higher class alongside competitors who train less.
