= 2022 IBSA Blind Football Asian Championships =

2022 IBSA Blind Football Asia/Oceania Championships
Tournament details
- Host country: India
- City: Kochi
- Dates: 9 November – 20 November 2022
- Teams: 10

Final positions
- Champions: China (7th title)
- Runners-up: Thailand
- Third place: Japan
- Fourth place: Iran

Tournament statistics
- Matches played: 13
- Goals scored: 62 (4.77 per match)
- Top scorer(s): Tomonari Kuroda (9 goals)
- Best player: Zhu Ruiming
- Best goalkeeper: Kasikonudompaisan Ponchai
- Fair play award: Australia

The 2022 IBSA Blind Football Asia/Oceania Championships is IBSA Blind Football Asian Championships' 9th edition for men, and 1st for women of the blind football tournament. The competition is being held at Kochi, India, will all matches being played at the United Sports Center between 9 November and 20 November 2022.

== Men's tournament ==
=== Group A ===
Pos	Team	Pld	W	D	L	GF	GA	GD	Pts	Qualification
1	China	4	4	0	0	16	0	+16	12	Semi-finals
2	Thailand	4	3	0	1	7	4	+3	9	Semi-finals
3	India	4	1	1	2	4	6	−2	4	
4	Malaysia	4	0	2	2	1	6	−5	2	
5	Kazakhstan	4	0	1	3	1	13	−12	1	

Updated to match(es) played on 16 November 2022. Source: IBSA Group Standings and IBSA Score Card
11 November 2022
18:00

India	4–0	Kazakhstan

United Sports Center, Kochi
11 November 2022
20:00

Thailand	2–0	Malaysia

United Sports Center, Kochi

13 November 2022
08:30

China	4–0	Thailand

United Sports Center, Kochi
13 November 2022
18:00

Malaysia	1–1	Kazakhstan

United Sports Center, Kochi

14 November 2022
08:30

Kazakhstan	0–5	China

United Sports Center, Kochi
14 November 2022
18:00

India	0–0	Malaysia

United Sports Center, Kochi

15 November 2022
08:30

Kazakhstan	0–3	Thailand

United Sports Center, Kochi
15 November 2022
18:00

China	4–0	India

United Sports Center, Kochi

16 November 2022
08:30

Malaysia	0–3	China

United Sports Center, Kochi
16 November 2022
18:00

Thailand	2–0	India

United Sports Center, Kochi

=== Group B ===
Pos	Team	Pld	W	D	L	GF	GA	GD	Pts	Qualification
1	Japan	4	4	0	0	24	0	+24	12	Semi-finals
2	Iran	4	3	0	1	18	2	+16	9	Semi-finals
3	South Korea	4	2	0	2	9	8	+1	6	
4	Uzbekistan	4	1	0	3	2	22	−20	3	
5	Australia	4	0	0	4	0	21	−21	0	

Updated to match(es) played on 16 November 2022. Source: IBSA Group Standings and IBSA Score Card
12 November 2022
18:00

Iran	8–0	Australia

United Sports Center, Kochi
12 November 2022
20:00

Japan	11–0	Uzbekistan

United Sports Center, Kochi

13 November 2022
16:00

South Korea	5–0	Uzbekistan

United Sports Center, Kochi
13 November 2022
20:00

Australia	0–8	Japan

United Sports Center, Kochi

14 November 2022
16:00

Japan	4–0	South Korea

United Sports Center, Kochi
14 November 2022
20:00

Uzbekistan	0–6	Iran

United Sports Center, Kochi

15 November 2022
16:00

Iran	0–1	Japan

United Sports Center, Kochi
15 November 2022
20:00

South Korea	3–0	Australia

United Sports Center, Kochi

16 November 2022
16:00

Australia	0–2	Uzbekistan

United Sports Center, Kochi
16 November 2022
20:00

South Korea	1–4	Iran

United Sports Center, Kochi

=== Placement stage ===
==== 9th-place placement match ====
17 November 2022
10:30

Australia	0–0 (1–2 pen.)	Kazakhstan

United Sports Center, Kochi

==== 5th/6th-place mini-tournament ====
Pos	Team	Pld	W	D	L	GF	GA	GD	Pts	Qualification
1	South Korea	3	2	1	0	7	1	+6	7	Qualification for 2023 IBSA Inter-Continental Tournament
2	Malaysia	3	1	2	0	3	2	+1	5	Qualification for 2023 IBSA Inter-Continental Tournament
3	India	3	1	1	1	3	2	+1	4	
4	Uzbekistan	3	0	0	3	2	10	−8	0	

Updated to match(es) played on 27 November 2022. Source: Group Standings
- The IBSA decided to repeat the scorelines of matches which have been already played in the tournament, then, there was no rematch. South Korea were handed a 5–0 win against Uzbekistan, while India were handed a 0–0 draw with Malaysia.

17 November 2022
08:30

Malaysia	3–2	Uzbekistan

United Sports Center, Kochi
17 November 2022
16:00

India	1–2	South Korea

United Sports Center, Kochi

18 November 2022
08:30

Malaysia	0–0	South Korea

United Sports Center, Kochi
18 November 2022
10:30

India	2–0	Uzbekistan

United Sports Center, Kochi

=== Semi-finals ===
17 November 2022
18:00

China	1–1 (3–2 pen.)	Iran

United Sports Center, Kochi
17 November 2022
20:00

Japan	0–0 (1–2 pen.)	Thailand

United Sports Center, Kochi

=== 3rd-place match ===
18 November 2022
18:00

Japan	0–0 (2–1 pen.)	Iran

United Sports Center, Kochi

=== Final ===
18 November 2022
18:00

China	0–0 (2–1 pen.)	Thailand

United Sports Center, Kochi

=== Top scorers ===
As of 16 November 2022

Rank	Player	Goals
1	(Japan) Tomonari Kuroda	9
2	(Japan) Ryo Kawamura	7
3	(Japan) Taichi Hirabayashi	5
3	(Iran) Sadeg Rahimighasr	5
3	(Iran) Behzad Zadaliashgari	5

== Women's tournament ==
It was played between two national teams in a two-legged final format.

11 November 2022
08:30 (IST +05:30)

India	0–2	Japan
		Sora Kikushima

United Sports Centre, Kochi
12 November 2022
08:30 (IST +05:30)

India	0–1	Japan
		Sora Kikushima

United Sports Centre, Kochi
