= Mali at the 2020 Summer Paralympics =

- Flag of Mali
- IPC code: MLI
- NPC: National Paralympic Committee of Mali

in Tokyo, Japan 24 August 2021 – 5 September 2021
- Competitors: 2 (1 man and 1 woman) in 1 sport and 2 events
- Medals: Gold 0 Silver 0 Bronze 0 Total 0

Summer Paralympics appearances (overview)
- 2000; 2004; 2008; 2012; 2016; 2020; 2024

Mali competed at the 2020 Summer Paralympics in Tokyo, Japan, from 24 August to 5 September 2021.

== Athletics ==
Two athletes represented Mali in athletics.

Men's track

Athlete	Events	Heat		Final	
Athlete	Events	Time	Rank	Time	Rank
Youssouf Coulibaly	100 m T13	11.52	5	did not advance	

Women's field

Athlete	Event	Final	
Athlete	Event	Result	Rank
Korotoumou Coulibaly	Discus throw F55	18.64; AR	9

== See also ==
- Mali at the Paralympics
- Mali at the 2020 Summer Olympics
