= Blind football in Cameroon =

Blind football in Cameroon is a sport played by people with vision impairments in Cameroon. The sport is currently in the development stage, with various activities supporting these efforts. A national competition for the sport took place in September 2016.

Internationally, Cameroon, along with Morocco, was one of the first countries in Africa to establish a men's blind football team. They missed out on a tournament in 2014 because of visa issues. The following year, the country hosted 2015 IBSA Blind Football African Championship. Cameroon finished second and failed to qualify for the 2016 Summer Paralympics. Following the tournament, there was an extended pay dispute between the national blind sport federation and the government, and the national team over the team's compensation for playing in the tournament. In July 2016, the national team ranked twenty-fifth in the world.

Cameroonian players have gone abroad, with Yvan Wouandji representing France in the sport at the 2012 Summer Paralympics.

== Domestic ==
Blind football players can face a number of challenges in Cameroon. The specialized football used for the sport costs five times as much as a traditional soccer ball because of the need to have it make sound for players to hear.

There has been a push to develop disability sports, and specifically blind football, in Africa in recent years. A lot of the football side has come through Cécifoot Impacts. They have worked on setting up football training centers in countries like Morocco, Senegal, Cameroon and the Ivory Coast. Cécifoot Impacts is an organization created by French Union for Blind and Visually Impaired People (UNADEV) with support of the International Blind Sports Federation (IBSA) to support the opportunity of all blind and vision impaired people to play football.

Development efforts in Cameroon have included a three-day referee development workshop in November 2003. In 2014, a national technical center for blind football opened in Cameroon. This was done as part of efforts by the IBSA to bring the football resources to Africa to allow for African-based and supported growth of the sport, instead of Europeans going to Africa to develop the sport without building the local infrastructure.

Blind football in Cameroon is also supported by national competitions. In September 2016 at the end of the 2015-2016 disability sports season, a national cup was held. The final involved Derouffignac and PROMHANDICAM Yaounde, with Promhandicam emerging victorious after the game ended 1 - 1 in regulation time. The game went to penalty kicks, with Promhandicam scoring two to Derouffignac's zero. Following the match, Charles Atangana from Derouffignac and André Ndo of Promhandicam were honored for being the best player and leading scorer respectively.

== International ==
In 2014, only two African countries had national teams: Cameroon and Morocco. There had never been a continental tournament as a result. The national team was supposed to play in a competition in France in 2014 to qualify for the IBSA World Championships. They were unable to do so because the team was denied visas to go to France. The French organizers, UNADEV, had been working for years to try to bring about the competition and had successfully been able to secure visas for the Moroccan team. The Cameroon delegation would have included 6 players, and three support staff. UNADEV had promised to cover all costs of participation for Cameroon in this competition and the costs of the winner of the competition to compete at the IBSA World Championships.

Douala, Cameroon hosted the 2015 IBSA Blind Football African Championship in October of that year. The tournament was a qualifier for the 2016 Summer Paralympics in Rio. Cameroon played Morocco in the final, losing 0 - 2. Other teams in the competition included Egypt, Senegal and Mali. Morocco's win against Cameroon secured them a berth to the Rio Games. Cameroon beat Senegal 2 - 0 in the semifinals to qualify for the finals. The roster for the game against Senegal included Nyobia Njoya, Zogning Lontsi Fulbert, Kaze Gaetan, Erick Michel Bonfeu, Andeme Patrick Ndo, Christol Atangana Ntsama, Ferdinand Atangana Ntsama, Mohamed Garga, Partick Bakounga Awa, and Nsan Gou Arouna. They were coached by Lucien Mbonga. Their guide was Willy Djiepmo. They opened play by defeating the Ivory Coast 5 - 0 in group play, and then beat Mali 1 - 0. Charles Cristol Atangana and André Patrick Andeme Ndo both scored a pair of goals in their opener. Captain Patrick Bakounga Awa scored one goal in the team's game against the Ivory Coast and put in a second in goal for the tournament against Mali. Cameroon's Roger Milla watched the final between the host country and Morocco. Their final game of group play was against Senegal, whom they defeated 3 - 0. The victory put them at the top of their group.

National team players were each promised a bonus of 4 million West African CFA franc (USD$7213.32) if they finished second in the African Championships. This was to be on top of a participation rate of 500,000 XOF (USD$901.66) a day. This money was not paid following the tournament. The team also alleged that CNPC President Jean Jacques Ndoudoumou and Cameroonian Sports Federation for the Visually Impaired and the Disabled President Norbert Tsoungui had made commitments on their behalf without consulting the team. After attempts to talk to the Ministry of Sports and Physical Education and others about the lack of payment in December 2015, the national team announced a hunger strike to start February 29, 2016. Roger Milla stepped up to try to mediate the dispute between the players and the Ministry. Milla promised to bring the concerns of the ten players and two officials directly to the Minister, and in exchange players decided that they would drop their strike threat. As of September 2016, the team had still not been paid the bonuses they had been promised by the Ministry of Sports and Physical Education. Players claim they are owed 10.6 million XOF (USD$19115.29) each after all the bonuses are added together. After visiting the Ministry in late September, Ministry of Sports and Physical Education Secretary General Oumarou Tado said players should be paid no later than October 1, 2016. Tado attributed the delay in payment to a lack of budgeting for the bonus payments.

== National team ==
The team is nicknamed the Indomitable Blind Football Lions (French: Lions indomptables cecifootbal). In 2015 and 2016, the national team had 12 members. They are captained by Patrick Bakounga Awa. Other members of the 2015 and 2016 national team included Nsangou Arouna, Christian Nyobia Njoya, Charles Cristol Atangana, André Patrick Andeme and Mohomed Garba. They were coached by Lucien Mbanga in 2015 and 2016. Club for the Blind Youth of Cameroon (CJARC) (French: Club des jeunes aveugles réhabilités du Cameroun) provided a development pathway for a number of players, with four club members being chosen for Cameroon's national team at the time of its establishment.

The Lions have been internationally ranked. On January 1, 2016, they were ranked twenty-fourth in the world, one spot behind Greece and one spot ahead of India. On July 31, 2016, they were ranked twenty-fifth in the world, one spot behind Georgia and one spot ahead of India.

=== Roster ===
Since the team's inception, a number of players have made caps for the team.

Player	Number	National Team Years	Competition Appearances	Goals	Ref
Christian Nyobia Njoya	1	2015, 2016	2015 IBSA Blind Football African Championship		
Zogning Lontsi Fulbert	16	2015	2015 IBSA Blind Football African Championship		
Kaze Gaetan	2	2015	2015 IBSA Blind Football African Championship		
Erick Michel Bonfeu	3	2015	2015 IBSA Blind Football African Championship		
André Patrick Andeme Ndo	4	2015, 2016	2015 IBSA Blind Football African Championship	2 vs. Ivory Coast (2015)	
Charles Christol Atangana Ntsama	5	2015, 2016	2015 IBSA Blind Football African Championship	2 vs. Ivory Coast (2015)	
Ferdinand Atangana Ntsama	7	2015	2015 IBSA Blind Football African Championship		
Mohomed Garba	9	2015, 2016	2015 IBSA Blind Football African Championship		
Patrick Bakounga Awa	10 (Captain)	2015, 2016	2015 IBSA Blind Football African Championship	1 vs. Ivory Coast (2015) 1 vs. Mali (2015)	
Nsangou Arouna	11	2015, 2016	2015 IBSA Blind Football African Championship		

=== Support staff ===
The national team has a number of other people supporting them including a coach, guide, physiotherapist and others.

Person	Role	Competitions	Ref
Lucien Mbonga	National team coach	2015 IBSA Blind Football African Championship	
Willy Djiepmo	Guide	2015 IBSA Blind Football African Championship	
Tankio Hortense	Technical assistant	2015 IBSA Blind Football African Championship	
Tamane	Doctor	2015 IBSA Blind Football African Championship	
Atouba	Physiotherapist	2015 IBSA Blind Football African Championship	

== Players ==
One blind football player from Cameroon is Yvan Wouandji. Born in Cameroon in 1994, he moved to France when he was ten years old to get treatment for his eyes. He faced challenges in staying in the country legally because French authorities sometimes think people claim they have diseases to try to game the system. He started playing football there, eventually making the France national team. He was with the French team when they won a silver medal at the 2012 Summer Paralympics in London. While playing a friendly against Germany for France in 2010, he dribbled the ball down the field and scored. Video of this went viral on YouTube, getting over 750,000 views, with an additional 53,000 views on Daily Motion. He plays club football for Saint-Mandé (Val-de-Marne).

== Referees ==
In the period of 2014 to 2016, the country had one IBSA 5-a-side football certified referee, Bertrand Desire Mboutngam.

== See also ==
- Blind football
- Goalball in Cameroon
- Para-athletics in Cameroon
- Paralympic association football
