= Mali at the 2016 Summer Paralympics =

- IPC code: MLI
- NPC: National Paralympic Committee of Mali

in Rio de Janeiro
- Competitors: 2 in 1 sports
- Medals: Gold 0 Silver 0 Bronze 0 Total 0

Summer Paralympics appearances (overview)
- 2000; 2004; 2008; 2012; 2016; 2020; 2024

Mali competed at the 2016 Summer Paralympics in Rio de Janeiro, Brazil, from 7 September to 18 September 2016.

== Athletics ==
Men's Track

Athlete	Events	Heat		Final	
Athlete	Events	Time	Rank	Time	Rank
Oumar Sidibe	100 m T38	did not finish		did not advance	

Women's Field

Athlete	Events	Result	Rank
Korotoumou Coulibaly	Javelin F55-56	12.77	12

== See also ==
- Mali at the 2016 Summer Olympics
