= Mali at the 2012 Summer Paralympics =

- IPC code: MLI
- NPC: National Paralympic Committee of Mali

in London
- Competitors: 1 in 1 sport
- Medals: Gold 0 Silver 0 Bronze 0 Total 0

Summer Paralympics appearances (overview)
- 2000; 2004; 2008; 2012; 2016; 2020; 2024

Mali competed at the 2012 Summer Paralympics in London, United Kingdom from August 29 to September 9, 2012.

== Athletics ==
Men's track

Athlete	Event	Heat		Final	
Athlete	Event	Result	Rank	Result	Rank
Mahamane Sacko	100m T46	DSQ		Did not advance	
Mahamane Sacko	200m T46	23.02	5	Did not advance	

== See also ==
- Mali at the Paralympics
- Mali at the 2012 Summer Olympics
