= Mali at the 2000 Summer Paralympics =

- IPC code: MLI
- NPC: National Paralympic Committee of Mali

in Sydney
- Competitors: 1 in 1 sport
- Medals: Gold 0 Silver 0 Bronze 0 Total 0

Summer Paralympics appearances (overview)
- 2000; 2004; 2008; 2012; 2016; 2020; 2024

Mali made its Paralympic Games début at the 2000 Summer Paralympics in Sydney. The country sent only one athlete (Facourou Sissoko), who competed in powerlifting. He did not win a medal. One of nineteen powerlifters in the men's up to 75 kg category, he lifted 130 kg, placing him last of the seventeen athletes who successfully lifted a weight.

Although Sissoko intended to return to the Games in 2008, he was banned before being able to compete, having been tested positive for steroids.

== Results ==
Name	Sport	Event	Score	Rank
Facourou Sissoko	Powerlifting	Men's Up To 75 kg	130 kg	17th

== See also ==
- Mali at the Paralympics
- Mali at the 2000 Summer Olympics
