= Mali at the 2008 Summer Paralympics =

- IPC code: MLI
- NPC: National Paralympic Committee of Mali

in Beijing
- Competitors: 0 in 0 sports
- Medals: Gold 0 Silver 0 Bronze 0 Total 0

Summer Paralympics appearances (overview)
- 2000; 2004; 2008; 2012; 2016; 2020; 2024

Mali sent a delegation to compete at the 2008 Summer Paralympics in Beijing, People's Republic of China. According to official records, the only athlete would have been powerlifter Facourou Sissoko. However, Sissoko was not allowed to start in the -75 kg class due to having tested positive for steroid use on September 6. He was given a two-year ban

== See also ==
- Mali at the Paralympics
- Mali at the 2008 Summer Olympics
