= Football 5-a-side at the 2010 Asian Para Games =

- Venue: Aoti Hockey Field
- Location: Guangzhou, China
- Dates: 13–18 December
- Nations: 5

Medalists
gold medal	China
silver medal	Iran
bronze medal	South Korea

5-a-side football or blind football at the 2010 Asian Para Games were held in Aoti Hockey Field from December 13 to December 18. There was 1 gold medals in this sport.

== Medalists ==
Event	Gold	Silver	Bronze
Men's team	China (CHN) Xu Huachu; Chen Shanyong; Li Xiaoqiang; Yu Yutan; Gao Kai; Gao Tianqi; Wang Zhoubin; Zheng Wenfa; Wang Yafeng; Niu Lei; Coach: Zou Hongmou	Iran (IRI) Morteza Maboodi Dalivand; Haftdar Pourrazavi; Kambiz Mohkam Nashtifani; Abdolja Gholgholizadeh; Mohammadreza Jalili; Abdolhamid Shalhavizadeh; Mohammad Heidari; Ardekani Shah Hosseini; Hossein Rajab Pour; Asghar Rouhi; Coach: Javad Felfeli	South Korea (KOR) Kim Sang-won; Park Jung-ho; Jang Yeong-jun; Yoon Jong-suk; Shin Yun-cheol; Park Seung-woo; Oh Yong-kyun; Ha Ji-young; Kwak Chang-hyun; Kim Kyung-ho; Coach: Lee Ok-hyeong

== Result ==
=== Group stage ===
Team	P	W	D	L	G	GA	GD	Score
China (CHN)	4	4	0	0	15	1	+14	12
Iran (IRI)	4	3	0	1	8	3	+5	9
Japan (JPN)	4	1	1	2	4	7	–3	4
South Korea (KOR)	4	1	1	2	4	9	–5	4
Thailand (THA)	4	0	0	4	3	14	–11	0

2010-12-13
14:00

South Korea	3–2	Thailand

Aoti Hockey Field

2010-12-13
16:00

China	3–0	Japan

Aoti Hockey Field

2010-12-14
14:00

Iran	3–0	Thailand

Aoti Hockey Field

2010-12-14
16:00

South Korea	0–4	China

Aoti Hockey Field

2010-12-15
14:00

Japan	3–1	Thailand

Aoti Hockey Field

2010-12-15
16:00

South Korea	0–2	Iran

Aoti Hockey Field

2010-12-16
14:00

Thailand	0–5	China

Aoti Hockey Field

2010-12-16
16:00

Iran	2–0	Japan

Aoti Hockey Field

2010-12-17
14:00

Iran	1–3	China

Aoti Hockey Field

2010-12-17
16:00

Japan	1–1	South Korea

Aoti Hockey Field

=== Bronze-medal match ===
2010-12-18
14:00

Japan	0–0 (a.e.t.)	South Korea
Penalties
	1–2

Aoti Hockey Field

=== Gold-medal match ===
2010-12-18
16:00

China	1–0	Iran

Aoti Hockey Field
