= Blind football =

Five-on-five football game for visually impaired players

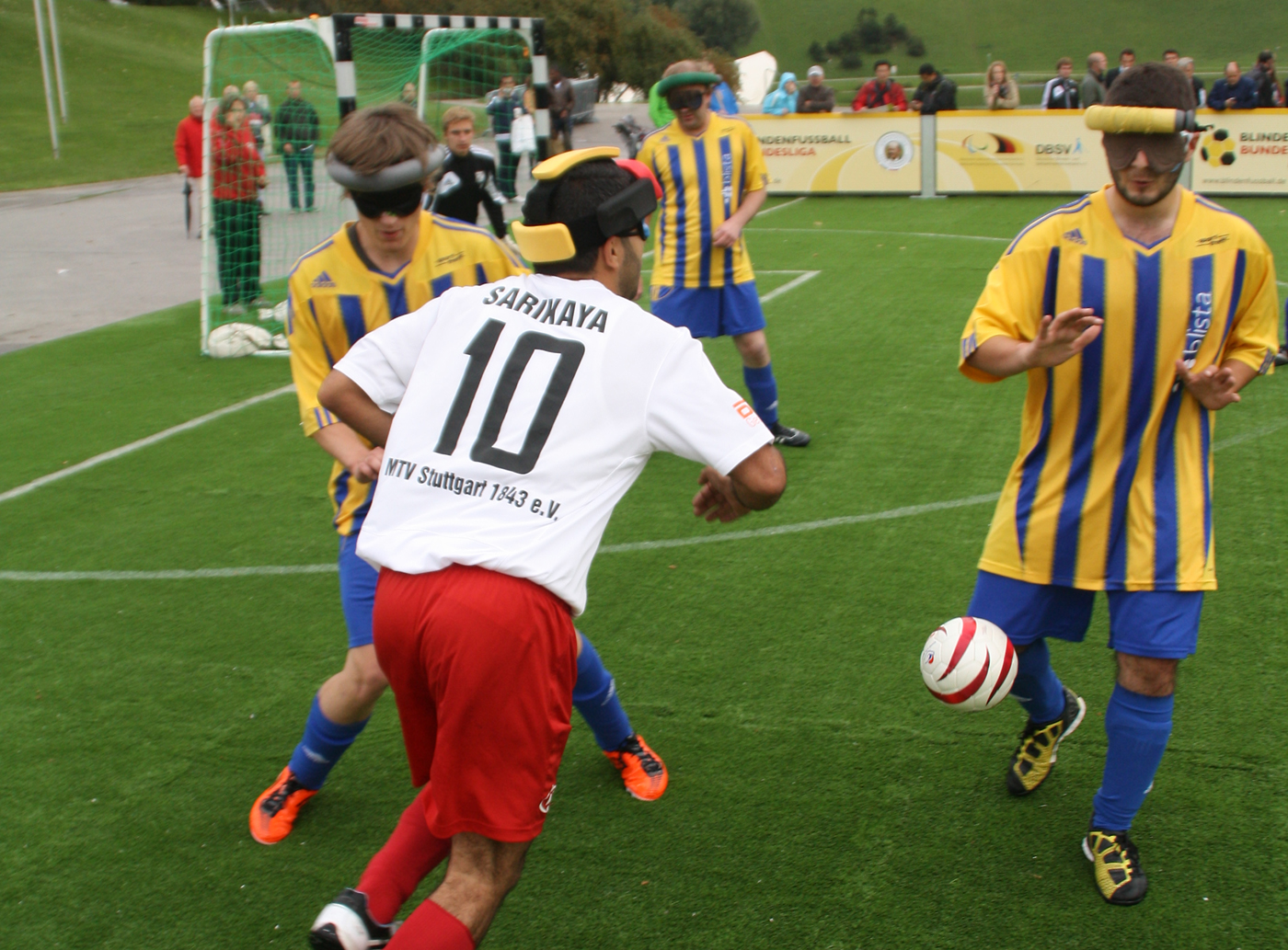
A blind football match between two teams in Germany

Blind football is a 5-a-side variation of football designed for visually impaired athletes. It is governed by the International Blind Sports Federation (IBSA) and has participated in the Paralympic programme since the Athens 2004 Paralympic Games.

== Overview ==
According to IBSA, "football for the blind and partially sighted started out as a playground game for school children in special schools for the visually impaired."

Blind football, is an adaptation of football for athletes with visual impairments including blindness. The sport, governed by the International Blind Sports Federation, is played with modified FIFA rules. The field of play is smaller, and is surrounded by boards. Teams are reduced to five players, including the goalkeeper, per team. Teams may also use one guide, who is positioned off the field of play, to assist in directing players. The ball is equipped with a noise-making device to allow players to locate it by sound. Matches consist of two 20-minute halves, with a ten-minute break at half-time. The field size is 40m by 20m and is surrounded by kickboards, which prevent the ball from leaving the pitch. The offside rule and throw-ins do not apply in blind football

== Classification ==
Blind football players are assigned to one of three sport classes based on their level of visual impairment:

- B1 – Totally or almost totally blind; from no light perception up to light perception but inability to recognize the shape of a hand.
- B2 – Partially sighted; able to recognize the shape of a hand up to a visual acuity of 2/60 or a visual field of less than 5 degrees.
- B3 – Partially sighted; visual acuity from 2/60 to 6/60 or visual field from 5 to 20 degrees

Teams are permitted to use sighted athletes as goalkeepers and guides; sighted goalkeepers cannot have been registered with FIFA for at least five years.

Two types of competition exist. For Class B1 games, only athletes with sport class B1 are permitted as players, with the exception of the goalkeepers and the guides, who may be class B2, B3, or sighted. For Class B2/B3 games, teams can field players in sport classes B2 and B3; at least two B2 players must be on the field at all times.

== Rules ==
The rules of blind football are very similar to the rules of futsal and the official FIFA rules with few adjustments. There are, however, some important exceptions.

- All players, except for the goalkeeper, wear blackout eye masks
- The ball has been modified to make a jingling or rattling sound, allowing players to follow the ball
- Players are required to say "voy", "go", or something similar when going for the ball; this alerts the other players about their position.
- An offence guide, positioned outside the field of play, provides instructions to the players and is allowed to make noise near the goal.
- The goalie may shout instructions to the players.
- The stadium must be silent until a goal is scored.

== Game play ==
To play blind football effectively, players must learn methods to determine the state of the field without visual cues:

One such method is utilizing head movement to more accurately track the ball's movements. By orienting their heads towards the sound of the ball, a player can determine when the ball changes direction based on which side of their head they hear the noise from. This allowed for better tracking of the ball, but has only been proven to work for ball trapping. Another method that allows the player to track the ball more effectively is learning how the sound pressure of the ball relates to its distance. By realizing these auditory changes, the players can understand how far the ball is from their location when the ball is kicked.

Players must also differentiate the sound of the ball from their teammates and opponents. Blind players are trained to be more receptive to the auditory cues their teammates provide to avoid defensive lines and understand the position of other players. Blind Football players also usually run slower and take smaller strides on average due to the lack of visual cues, and they also generally pass less. Passing is less prevalent in the blind game due to the difficulty associated with it, as they have to rely entirely on the direction of the voice of their teammate.

== History ==
=== First games (1930–1986) ===
The first people to play blind football were children in Brazil's schools for the visually impaired. It was first recorded having been played sometime in the first half of the twentieth century. The game later gained prominence in Brazil, with it later spreading to other countries by the 1960s. It was around this time that the game began getting support from the countries which it gained popularity in, such as the United States, which adopted the Rehabilitation Act in 1973, enabling it to spread further. For a while, there was no consensus on a proper ruleset, with each country playing its own variation of the game. National championships for the game began to arise around the world, with the first Spanish national championships taking place in 1986.

=== The International Blind Sports Federation (1981–2016) ===
In 1981 the International Blind Sports Federation was created, and it attempted to create a single unified ruleset for the game. But it was not until 1995 that the most prominent Blind football countries such as Brazil joined the IBSA. With there now being an internationally agreed upon ruleset in place, the first regional championship for blind football was hosted, and it was hosted in Paraguay and Spain in 1997. European and American championships for the game were then hosted shortly after, with the first World Championships happening in 1998.

After the first world championships and regional championships, the game started to become more prevalent throughout the world. The sport was then added to the Summer Paralympic Games in 2004, and it slowly became one of the most popular sports in the Paralympic Games.

=== Present day ===
Today, blind football is one of the most popular Paralympic sports, with over 60 countries actively playing blind football and with 46 countries being in the men's ranking. The sport now receives more support than most of the other Paralympic sports, with there being many children's training programs, such as a training session that was coached by David Beckham who coached children in blind soccer, and programs like the Bee Active Kids program in Britain, which encouraged children to try out blind soccer.

=== Blind football at the Paralympics ===
After the first world championships and regional championships, the game started to become more prevalent throughout the world. The sport was then added to the Summer Paralympic Games in 2004, when Brazil won gold in a final with Argentina, whilst Spain was placed third with a bronze medal. Blind football slowly became a popular sport~~s~~ in the Paralympic Games. Brazil has won the gold medal at every Paralympic Games, except for the Paris 2024 Paralympic Games. In the French capital Brazil won bronze, Argentina took silver and hosts France secured a historic first Paralympic gold medal.

== Player safety ==
Player safety is ensured through many policies, rules, and measures to provide athletes with a safe environment on and off the pitch. The United States Association of Blind Athletes provides an outline of player, coaches, and referee training, concussion safety, a place to report misconduct, background checks, and more. Organized youth programs also help improve safety of the game by instilling good practices in young ballers for when they grow older.

=== On the pitch ===
For player safety on the field, the ball contains a bell or noise system for players to locate it through sound. When players move towards the ball they watch out for audio cues that signals to them the position of other players to reduce collisions. There are boards along the field to keep the ball in play but also for players to touch and get a sense of where they are on the field. Soft helmets are sometimes worn by athletes that prefer them which protect them in the case of a head collision.

== Notable players ==
- Jefinho
- Ricardinho

== Blind football competitions ==
- World Blind Football Championships
- Blind football at the IBSA World Games
- IBSA Blind Football Asian Championships
- IBSA Blind Football African Championships
- IBSA Blind Football American Championships
- IBSA Blind Football European Championships
- IBSA Blind Football World Grand Prix
- Football 5-a-side at the Summer Paralympics
- Football 5-a-side at the Asian Para Games
- Football 5-a-side at the ASEAN Para Games
- Football 5-a-side at the Parapan American Games

== See also ==
- Football 5-a-side at the Summer Paralympics
- World Blind Football Championships
- Paralympic Games
- Paralympic soccer
- Football 5-a-side at the Asian Para Games
- IBSA Blind Football Asian Championships
- Blind football in Cameroon
- Blind football in Australia
- Blind football at the 2023 ASEAN Para Games
- Blind football at the 2024 Summer Paralympics
