= Mali at the 2024 Summer Paralympics =

- IPC code: MLI
- NPC: National Paralympic Committee of Mali

in Paris, France August 28, 2024 – September 8, 2024
- Competitors: 2 (1 man and 1 woman) in 1 sport
- Flag bearers: Samba Coulibaly; Korotoumou Coulibaly
- Medals: Gold 0 Silver 0 Bronze 0 Total 0

Summer Paralympics appearances (overview)
- 2000; 2004; 2008; 2012; 2016; 2020; 2024

Mali competed at the 2024 Summer Paralympics in Paris, France, from 28 August to 8 September 2024. This was the nation's sixth time competing at the Summer Paralympic Games after it made its debut at the 2000 Summer Paralympics. The delegation consisted of two competitors from one sport.

== Competitors ==
The following is the list of number of competitors in the Games.

Sport	Men	Women	Total
Athletics	1	1	2
Total	1	1	2

== Athletics ==
Field event

Athlete	Event	Qualification		Final	
Athlete	Event	Result	Rank	Result	Rank
Korotoumou Coulibaly	Women's discus throw F55	—		18.57	10
Korotoumou Coulibaly	Women's javelin throw F56	12.66	6	Did not advance	

Track and road event

Field event

Athlete	Event	Heat		Final	
Athlete	Event	Result	Rank	Result	Rank
Samba Coulibaly	Men's 100 metres T13	10.95	3 Q	10.97	7

== See also ==
- Mali at the 2024 Summer Olympics
- Mali at the Paralympics
