= Goalball in Cameroon =

Goalball in Cameroon is one of several sports available to people with vision impairments to participate in. It arrived late to the blind sports community in Cameroon, with torball arriving first. It has subsequently, been supported domestically by clubs such as Club for the Blind Youth of Cameroon (CJARC) and PROMHANDICAM Yaounde.

The sport has had been included on the domestic sports calendar, with national competitions taking place in 2006, 2012, and 2014. Cameroon has also been involved with the sport on the international level, with the men playing in the 2007 All-Africa Games and the 2008 African Francophone Games for the Handicapped. The women's team has been invited to participate in several competitions. The country has both men and women players who were classified internationally for the 2016 summer season. Some of these players have also represented Cameroon internationally in athletics.

== Club and association support ==
Goalball was a late arrival to the blind sports community in Cameroon. The sport was introduced in the 2000s. Prior to that, the major ball sport for blind people in Cameroon was torball. Since then, the sport is supported by local clubs and schools, and via activities at conferences and other events.

Club for the Blind Youth of Cameroon (CJARC) (Note: The name of the organization in French is, Club des jeunes aveugles réhabilités du Cameroun.) is an association supporting blind youth. In 2006, they supported a number of sporting activities for the blind at their club including athletics, African wrestling, judo and goalball. The club was still active supporting women's goalball in 2014, 2015 and 2016. Another association supporting disability sports is PROMHANDICAM Yaounde. (Note: The name of the organization in French is, Promhandicam de Yaoundé.) In 2004, they were supporting wheelchair basketball and goalball. That year, the club was visited by England's Prince Edward.

The sport has also appeared on the program for conferences related to disability rights in Cameroon. An example of this occurred at the 2012 Vaincre Handicap Conference, which took place in November in Douala, when Public School Akwa (Note: The name of the school in French is, l’école publique d’Akwa.) played an exhibition match against Douala.

== Domestic competitions ==
Goalball has been supported by a number of domestic competitions in the country. The sport was contested at the 2006 Champion of Cameroon in Handicap Sports that took place at the Higher Institute of Youth and Sports. PROMHANDICAM won the event, defeating CJARC 17 - 9 in the final.

Camtel Yaoundé has organized several national championships for goalball. Following the 2011-2012 domestic season, they organized a men's and women's national club championship. The men's final saw Rouffignac go up against CJARC. The match was close with CJARC coming out ahead by a score of 4 - 3. In the women's final, Fadi beat BGSA 13 - 3. The domestic season again took place for 2013–2014. Following the conclusion of the season, Camtel Yaoundé hosted the men's national club championship, with four teams taking part. These teams were Evangelical College Goalball Club of Douala, (Note: The name of the club in French is, Collège évangélique goalball club de Douala.) Cispam Goalball Cub of Bafoussam, (Note: The name of the club in French is, Cispam goalball club de Bafoussam.) Mount Cameroon Buea Goalball (Note: The name of the club in French is, Mont Cameroon goalball de Buea.) and PROMHANDICAM Yaounde.

== International competitions ==
Cameroon has participated in international goalball competitions, with the country having had both men and women's national teams competing abroad.

Cameroon sent a team to the 2007 All-Africa Games. The roster included André Patrick Ndo Andeme, Hervé Paulain Nomy Ngoma, Luc Yombi Kifie, and Boulom Théophile R. Le Grand. Goalball was on the program for the 2008 African Francophone Games for the Handicapped, which Cameroon was originally scheduled to host in July, but the Ministry of Sports and Physical Education postponed them because of poor facilities and lack of access to quality equipment. The Games did not take place until August. The men's national goalball team won gold at the event after Cameroon beat the Central African Republic 11 - 1 in the first game, and 13 - 3 in the return match.

The women's national team was invited to participate in the 2015 IBSA World Games in South Korea. In 2016, Cameroon was supposed to send a women's team to participate in International Blind Sports Federation (IBSA) Goalball Africa Regional Championships. Along with Cameroon, other nations that were supposed to participate in the women's tournament included Algeria, Côte d'Ivoire, Egypt, Ghana, Kenya, Morocco and Tunisia. The tournament was the first African Regional Championships which featured a women's competition. Their participation was in question until very close to the start of the tournament because of issues related to visas and international licenses. Cameroon ended up not going, with only Algeria, Egypt, Tunisia and Morocco participating.

== Goalball players ==
Cameroon has 13 players who had been classified internationally by the IBSA for the 2016 summer international goalball season. A number of these players have also represented Cameroon in athletics, including André Patrick Ndo Andeme and Simone Edwige Amandi Ngono. The women's national team assistant coach was Pascal Ele Mvondo.

Name	Gender	Birthday	Classification	Ref
Simone Edwige Amandi Ngono	Female	31/10/1991	B2	
Eliette Bruna Assampele	Female	17/05/1997	B1	
Charles Christole Atangana Ntsama	Male	22/09/1992	B1	
Patrick Bakounga Awa	Male	22/10/1986	B1	
Judith Kenekou	Female	22/05/1996	B1	
Judith Lebog Mariette	Female	13/05/1990	B1	
Malone Stephane Mollo Jules	Male	15/09/1996	B1	
Andre Patrick Ndo Andeme	Male	11/08/1985	B1	
Laurece Claire Ngansop Chimigni	Female	11/04/1998	B2	
Lucrece Raissa Ngansop Fobasso	Female	11/04/1998	B2	
Arouna Nsangou	Male	5/03/1992	B1	
Luc Yombi Kifie	Male	9/08/1986	B1	

== See also ==
- Blind football in Cameroon
- Para-athletics in Cameroon
