= World Blind Football Championships =

Football competition for the visually impaired

The World Blind Football Championships, formerly the Football-5-a-Side World Championships, were played for the first time in 1998.

== Men's B1 Category ==
Year	Venue	Date	Winners	Score	Runners-up	Third place	Score	Fourth place	Number of teams	Sources
1998; Details	(Brazil); Campinas	Sep	Brazil	1–0	Argentina	Spain	2–0	Colombia	6	
2000; Details	(Spain); Jerez de la Frontera	Sep 25–30	Brazil	4–0	Argentina	Spain	3–0	Greece	8	
2002; Details	(Brazil); Rio de Janeiro	Dec	Argentina	4–2	Spain	Brazil	2–0	Colombia	9	
2006; Details	(Argentina); Buenos Aires	Nov 24 - Dec 1	Argentina	1–0	Brazil	Paraguay	2–1	Spain	8	
2010; Details	(United Kingdom); Hereford	Aug 14–22	Brazil	2–0	Spain	China	1–0	England	10	
2014; Details	(Japan); Tokyo	Nov 16–24	Brazil	1–0	Argentina	Spain	0–0 (2–0 p)	China	12	
2018; Details	(Spain); Madrid	Jun 7–17	Brazil	2–0	Argentina	China	2–1	Russia	16	
2023; Details	(United Kingdom); Birmingham	Aug 15–25	Argentina	0–0 (2–1 p)	China	Brazil	7–1	Colombia	16	
2027; Details	(Brazil); São Paulo	October								

=== Medals summary ===
Rank	Nation	Gold	Silver	Bronze	Total
1	Brazil	5	1	2	8
2	Argentina	3	4	0	7
3	Spain	0	2	3	5
4	China	0	1	2	3
5	Paraguay	0	0	1	1
Totals (5 entries)		8	8	8	24

== Men's B2/B3 Category ==
Year	Venue	Date	Winners	Score	Runners-up	Third place	Score	Fourth place	Number of teams	Sources
1998; Details	(Brazil); Campinas	Sep	Belarus	3–2	Spain	Italy	9–2	Argentina	6	
2002; Details	(Italy); Varese	Sep 19–28	Belarus	14–2	Russia	Spain	3–2	Brazil	12	
2004; Details	(United Kingdom); Manchester	Dec 13–18	Belarus		Russia	Spain	3–2	Ukraine	12	
2007; Details	(Brazil); Sao Caetano do Sul	Aug 1–5	Belarus	1–1 (3–2 p)	Ukraine	Spain	4–0	Brazil	4	
2008; Details	(Argentina); Buenos Aires	Nov 16–22	Ukraine	0–0 (3–2 p)	Belarus	England		Argentina	10	
2011; Details	(Turkey); Antalya	Apr 3–9	Belarus	5–1	Ukraine	Spain	7–4	England	9	
2013; Details	(Japan); Miyagi	Feb 4–12	Russia	1–0 (a.e.t.)	Ukraine	England	14–0	Japan	4	
2015; Details	(South Korea); Seoul	May 11–16	Ukraine	3–1	Spain	Italy	2–1	Japan	5	
2017; Details	(Italy); Cagliari	May 29 - Jun 3	Ukraine	3–0	England	Russia	2–2 (2–1 p)	Spain	8	
2019; Details	(Turkey); Antalya	Dec 7–14	Ukraine	6–2	England	Russia	2–2 (3–2 p)	Turkey	7	
2023; Details	(United Kingdom); Birmingham	Aug 16–22	Ukraine	4–3 (a.e.t.)	England	Spain	9–0	Japan	7	

=== Medals summary ===
Rank	Nation	Gold	Silver	Bronze	Total
1	Ukraine	5	3	0	8
2	Belarus	5	1	0	6
3	Russia	1	2	2	5
4	England	0	3	2	5
5	Spain	0	2	5	7
6	Italy	0	0	2	2
Totals (6 entries)		11	11	11	33

== Women's results ==
=== B1/B2/B3 (together) ===
Year	Venue	Date	Winners	Score	Runners-up	Third place	Score	Fourth place	Number of teams	Sources
2020	(Nigeria); Enugu	Cancelled due to COVID-19 pandemic				—N/a	—N/a	—N/a	—N/a	
2023; Details	(United Kingdom); Birmingham	Aug 14–21	Argentina	2–1	Japan	Sweden	0–0 (1–0 p)	India	8	
2025	(India) Kakkanad	Oct 07- 11	Argentina	2–0	England	Japan	0–0 (2-1 p)	Brazil	8	
2027	(Brazil) São Paulo	October								

=== Medals summary ===
Rank	Nation	Gold	Silver	Bronze	Total
1	Argentina	2	0	0	2
2	Japan	0	1	1	2
3	England	0	1	0	1
4	Sweden	0	0	1	1
Totals (4 entries)		2	2	2	6

== See also ==
- Blind football at the IBSA World Games
- IBSA Blind Football World Grand Prix
- Blind football
- Cerebral Palsy International Sports and Recreation Association
- International Blind Sports Federation
- Paralympic games
- Paralympic sports
- Paralympic association football
- CP football
- Amputee football
