= 2018 IBSA World Blind Football Championship =

Tournament details
- Host country: Spain
- Dates: 7 June – 17 June
- Teams: 16 (from 6 confederations)
- Venue(s): Madrid (in 1 host city)

Final positions
- Champions: Brazil (5th title)
- Runners-up: Argentina
- Third place: China
- Fourth place: Russia

Tournament statistics
- Matches played: 44
- Goals scored: 136 (3.09 per match)

The 2018 IBSA World Blind Football Championship is a blind football tournament and the seventh World Blind Football Championship. The competition was staged in Spain between 7 June and 17 June 2018, and involved sixteen teams of visually impaired players from around the world competing to be crowned world champion. It was won for the fifth time by Brazil, who defeated their fellow finalists, Argentina, 2–0 to take the title.

== The tournament ==
The tournament got under way on 7 June with the opening match between Spain and Thailand. Brazil won the tournament after beating Argentina 2–0 in the final on 17 June. It was the fifth occasion on which Brazil have won the competition, and their team's striker, Ricardo Alves, was named Player of the tournament. China was awarded the fair play award.

== Draw ==
Pot 1	Pot 2	Pot 3	Not Ranked
1. Spain (assigned to A1); 2. Brazil; 3. Argentina; 4. China	5. Colombia; 6. France; 7. South Korea; 8. Turkey	9. Morocco	10. Costa Rica; 11. Great Britain; 12. Iran; 13. Mali; 14. Mexico; 15. Russia; 16. Thailand

== Group stage ==
=== Group A ===
Pos	Team	Pld	W	D	L	GF	GA	GD	Pts	Qualification
1	Spain (H)	3	2	0	1	5	2	+3	6	Quarter-finals
2	Morocco	3	2	0	1	5	4	+1	6	Quarter-finals
3	Thailand	3	1	0	2	4	5	−1	3	9th–12th place match
4	Turkey	3	1	0	2	2	5	−3	3	13th–16th place match

(H) Hosts
7 June 2018
18:00 UTC+2

Spain	2–1	Thailand

Madrid
8 June 2018
11:30 UTC+2

Turkey	1–2	Morocco

Madrid

9 June 2018
11:30 UTC+2

Spain	3–0	Morocco

Madrid
10 June 2018
11:30 UTC+2

Thailand	3–0	Turkey

Madrid

11 June 2018
11:30 UTC+2

Spain	0–1	Turkey

Madrid
12 June 2018
11:30 UTC+2

Morocco	3–0	Thailand

Madrid

=== Group B ===
Pos	Team	Pld	W	D	L	GF	GA	GD	Pts	Qualification
1	Argentina	3	2	1	0	4	0	+4	7	Quarter-finals
2	Colombia	3	2	1	0	5	2	+3	7	Quarter-finals
3	Iran	3	1	0	2	8	3	+5	3	9th–12th place match
4	France	3	0	0	3	1	13	−12	0	13th–16th place match

8 June 2018
14:00 UTC+2

Argentina	1–0	Iran

Madrid
8 June 2018
16:30 UTC+2

France	1–3	Colombia

Madrid

9 June 2018
16:30 UTC+2

Colombia	0–0	Argentina

Madrid
10 June 2018
16:30 UTC+2

Iran	7–0	France

Madrid

11 June 2018
16:30 UTC+2

Argentina	3–0	France

Madrid
12 June 2018
16:30 UTC+2

Colombia	2–1	Iran

Madrid

=== Group C ===
Pos	Team	Pld	W	D	L	GF	GA	GD	Pts	Qualification
1	China	3	3	0	0	4	0	+4	9	Quarter-finals
2	Russia	3	1	1	1	4	2	+2	4	Quarter-finals
3	Mexico	3	0	2	1	2	3	−1	2	9th–12th place match
4	South Korea	3	0	1	2	1	6	−5	1	13th–16th place match

8 June 2018
9:00 UTC+2

China	2–0	South Korea

Madrid
9 June 2018
9:00 UTC+2

Russia	1–1	Mexico

Madrid

10 June 2018
9:00 UTC+2

Mexico	0–1	China

Madrid
11 June 2018
9:00 UTC+2

South Korea	0–3	Russia

Madrid

12 June 2018
9:00 UTC+2

China	1–0	Russia

Madrid
12 June 2018
14:00 UTC+2

Mexico	1–1	South Korea

Madrid

=== Group D ===
Pos	Team	Pld	W	D	L	GF	GA	GD	Pts	Qualification
1	Brazil	3	3	0	0	23	2	+21	9	Quarter-finals
2	Great Britain	3	2	0	1	11	4	+7	6	Quarter-finals
3	Mali	3	1	0	2	2	10	−8	3	9th–12th place match
4	Costa Rica	3	0	0	3	2	22	−20	0	13th–16th place match

8 June 2018
19:00 UTC+2

Brazil	6–1	Mali

Madrid

9 June 2018
19:00 UTC+2

Costa Rica	1–14	Brazil

Madrid
10 June 2018
19:00 UTC+2

Mali	0–4	Great Britain

Madrid

11 June 2018
14:00 UTC+2

Costa Rica	0–1	Mali

Madrid
11 June 2018
19:00 UTC+2

Brazil	3–0	Great Britain

Madrid

12 June 2018
19:00 UTC+2

Great Britain	7–1	Costa Rica

Madrid

== Knockout stage ==
=== 9th–16th place match ===
13th place
A4	Turkey	7
D4	Costa Rica	0
15th place
B4	France	3
C4	South Korea	0

13th–16th place semifinals
A4	Turkey	4
B4	France	1
C4	South Korea	1
D4	Costa Rica	2

9th–16th place quarterfinals

9th–12th place semifinals
A3	Thailand	0
B3	Iran	4
C3	Mexico	1
D3	Mali	2

9th place
B3	Iran (p)	2(2)
D3	Mali	2(0)
11th place
A3	Thailand	1
C3	Mexico	2

=== Quarter-finals ===
Fifth place
A1	Spain	4
B2	Colombia	1
Seventh place
D2	Great Britain (p)	0(2)
A2	Morocco	0(1)

Consolation semifinals
D2	Great Britain	0(1)
A1	Spain (p)	0(2)
B2	Colombia	3
A2	Morocco	1

Quarterfinals
B1	Argentina (p)	1(1)
D2	Great Britain	1(0)
A1	Spain	0
C2	Russia	1
D1	Brazil	3
B2	Colombia	0
C1	China	1
A2	Morocco	0

Semifinals
B1	Argentina	1
C2	Russia	0
D1	Brazil	1
C1	China	0

Final
B1	Argentina	0
D1	Brazil	2
Third place
C2	Russia	0
C1	China	1

== Final ranking ==
Place	Team
1st place, gold medalist(s)	Brazil
2nd place, silver medalist(s)	Argentina
3rd place, bronze medalist(s)	China
4	Russia
5	Spain
6	Colombia
7	Great Britain
8	Morocco
9	Iran
10	Mali
11	Mexico
12	Thailand
13	Turkey
14	Costa Rica
15	France
16	South Korea
