= Football 5-a-side at the Asian Para Games =

- Organiser(s): OCA
- Founded: 2010
- Region: Asia
- Current champions: China
- Most championships: China (3 titles)
- Football 5-a-side at the 2026 Asian Para Games

Football 5-a-side or blind football has been contested in the Asian Para Games since its inception in 2010. Only men has competed in the football 5-a-side event in the games as of the 2014 edition. It was not contested in the 2018 games.

== Summaries ==
Year	Host	Final			Third-place game		
Year	Host	Champion	Score	Second Place	Third Place	Score	Fourth Place
2010; Details	(China); Guangzhou	China	1–0	Iran	South Korea	0–0 (a.e.t.) (pen. 2–1)	Japan
2014; Details	(South Korea); Incheon	Iran	round robin	Japan	China	round robin	South Korea
2022; Details	(China); Hangzhou	China	0–0 (pen. 1–2)	Iran	Thailand	0–0 (pen. 0–1)	Japan
2026; Details	(Japan); Nagoya	China	1–0	Japan	Iran	2–1	Thailand

== Medals ==
Rank	Nation	Gold	Silver	Bronze	Total
1	China (CHN)	3	0	1	4
2	Iran (IRN)	1	2	1	4
3	Japan (JPN)	0	2	0	2
4	South Korea (KOR)	0	0	1	1
4	Thailand (THA)	0	0	1	1
Totals (5 entries)		4	4	4	12

== Participating nations ==
Nation	(China) 2010	(South Korea) 2014	(China) 2022	Overall Appearances
China	1st	3rd	1st	3
India			5th	1
Iran	2nd	1st	2nd	3
Japan	4th	2nd	4th	3
Malaysia			6th	1
South Korea	3rd	4th		2
Thailand	5th	5th	3rd	3
