= Ulrich Pfisterer =

German footballer (born 1951)

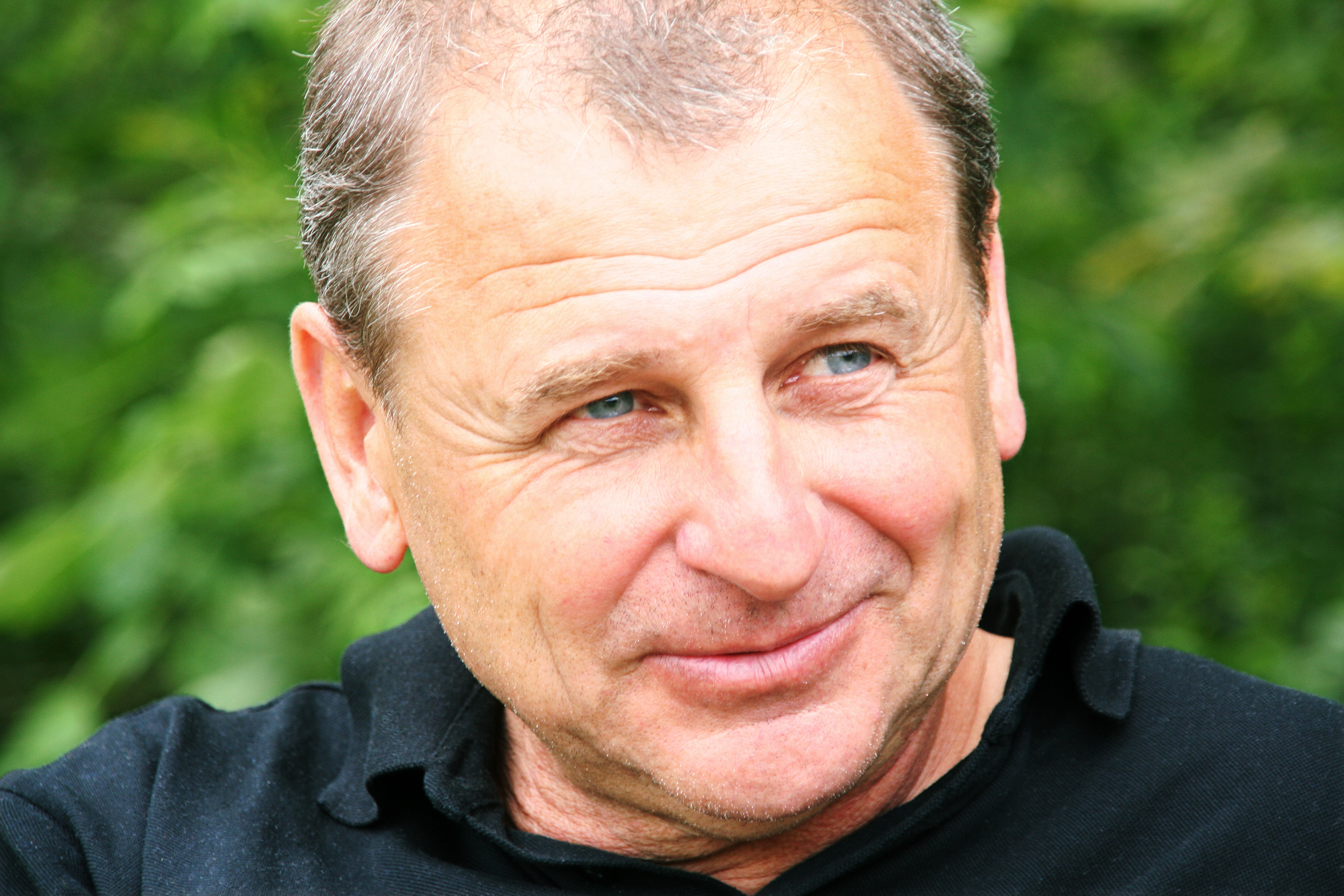
- Pfisterer in 2009

Personal information
- Date of birth: 4 November 1951 (age 74)
- Place of birth: Berlin, Germany
- Position: Midfielder

Team information
- Current team: German National Blind Football Team (Coach)

Senior career*
Years	Team	Apps	(Gls)
1974–1975	SC Westend 1901		
1976–1978	Juventus Melbourne		
1979–1980	Knox City		

Managerial career
- 1983–1984: Alemannia Richmond
- 2007–: MTV Stuttgart
- 2007–: German National Blind Football Team
- * Club domestic league appearances and goals

Ulrich Pfisterer (born 4 November 1951) is a German football coach and former player who is head coach of Blind Football Team Germany and of MTV Stuttgart since 2007.

== Playing career ==
Pfisterer was born in Berlin, Germany. He was 1970 German U21 champion with Hertha 03 Berlin. In 1972, he was a member of the German Olympic Squad, losing his place with the final cut off. In 1976, he signed a two-year contract with Juventus Melbourne, Australia.

== Coaching career ==
After finishing his Physical Education Teacher Training 1974 in Berlin, he went 1976 to Australia working as a P.E. teacher for the Royal Victorian Institute for the Blind, Melbourne. Here he developed many new approaches to teaching Blind and Vision Impaired Children. In 1982, he received his Post-Graduate Diploma in Physical Education and Recreation for the Disabled at Deakin University (Burwood State College). As a founding member of the Victorian Olympic Sports Association of and for the Blind (1980) he also introduced Goal Ball to Australia. From 1990 to 1998 he was asked by the University of Melbourne and Renwick College Sydney, to lecture in Early Childhood Development, Motorik, and Integration of the Blind. In 2005, he joined the Nikolauspflege in Stuttgart, Germany as a P.E. and English teacher. In May 2006 he participated in the IBSA Footsal-Workshop in Berlin, Germany. Straight after he founded the Blind Football team at the MTV Stuttgart, Germany. In 2007, he was asked to become Head Coach of the German B1-Football Team. In 2009 this side became 5th at the European Championships in Nantes, France. 2009, 2010, and 2011 he coached MTV Stuttgart to successive German Championships. Since July 2011 Ulrich Pfisterer is a member of IBSA Futsal Subcommittee.

== Publications ==
- Ulrich Pfisterer: Games for All of Us. Activities for Blind and Sighted Children in Integrated settings, Royal Victorian Institute for the Blind, Melbourne, 1983, ISBN 0-949390-03-8
- Ulrich Pfisterer: Peers-Video, P.E. and Integration, 1993
- Ulrich Pfisterer: Methods of Teaching Blind Football, NPC-Germany and Sepp-Herberger Stiftung, 2008
