= Mali at the Paralympics =

- IPC code: MLI
- NPC: National Paralympic Committee of Mali
- Medals: Gold 0 Silver 0 Bronze 0 Total 0

Summer appearances
- 2000; 2004; 2008; 2012; 2016; 2020; 2024

Mali made its Paralympic Games debut at the 2000 Summer Paralympics in Sydney, sending a single representative (Facourou Sissoko) to compete in powerlifting. In the up-to-75 kg category, he lifted 130 kg, finishing last of the seventeen competitors who successfully lifted a weight. He therefore did not win a medal.

Mali did not compete at the 2004 Paralympic Games because the country sent nine officials instead of the athletes. In 2008, Facourou Sissoko was due to compete as Mali's sole representative, but he was banned after testing positive for boldenone metabolite (a steroid) on the day of the opening ceremony.

Mahamane Sacko represented Mali on the track at the 2012 Summer Paralympics, but did not proceed past the heats.

== Results for Mali at the Paralympics ==
Name	Games	Sport	Event	Score	Rank
Facourou Sissoko	2000 Sydney	Powerlifting	Men's Up To 75 kg	130 kg	17th
Mahamane Sacko	2012 London	Athletics	100m T46	DSQ	
Mahamane Sacko	2012 London	Athletics	200m T46	23.02	did not advance
Oumar Sidibe	2016 Rio	Athletics	Men's 100m T38	DSQ	
Korotoumou Coulibaly	2016 Rio	Athletics	Women's javelin F56	12.77 m	12th
Youssouf Coulibaly	2020 Tokyo	Athletics	Men's 100m T13	11.52	5th in heat 1; did not qualify
Korotoumou Coulibaly	2020 Tokyo	Athletics	Women's discus F55	18.64 m	9th
Samba Coulibaly	2024 Paris	Athletics	Men's 100m T13	heats: 10.95 final: 10.97	3rd in heat 1; 7th
Korotoumou Coulibaly	2024 Paris	Athletics	Women's discus F55	18.57 m	10th
Korotoumou Coulibaly	2024 Paris	Athletics	Women's javelin F56	12.66 m	6th in qualification; did not advance

== See also ==
- Mali at the Olympics
