= IBSA Blind Football European Championships =

International blind football competition

The IBSA Blind Football European Championships is a continental competitions in blind football.

== Men's B1 Category ==
=== Division A ===
1997: 1999: 2001:? 2003: 2005: 2007: 2009: 2011: 2013: 2015: 2017: 2019: 2022:

Year	Venue	Date	1st	2nd	3rd	4th	5th	6th	7th	8th	9th	10th
1997	(Spain); Barcelona	Sep 16-20	ESP	GRE	GBR	ITA	POR					
1999	(Portugal); Porto	Jun 20-26	ESP	GBR	GRE	POR	FRA					
2001	Unknown											
2003	(United Kingdom); Manchester	Jul 13-19	ESP	ENG	FRA	GRE	ITA					
2005	(Spain); Torremolinos	Nov 27 - Dec 2	ESP	FRA	ENG	GRE	ITA	POR	RUS			
2007	(Greece); Athens	Sep 22 - Oct 1	ESP	GBR	FRA	GRE	ITA	TUR	GER			
2009	(France); Nantes	Jun 26 - Jul 6	FRA	ENG	ESP	GRE	GER	TUR	RUS	ITA	BLR	
2011	(Turkey); Aksaray	Sep 25 - Oct 1	FRA	ESP	ENG	TUR	RUS	GRE	ITA	GER		
2013	(Italy); Loano	Jun 15-22	ESP	FRA	TUR	GER	RUS	ITA	GRE	ENG		
2015	(United Kingdom); Hereford	Aug 22-29	TUR	RUS	ESP	ENG	FRA	GER	ITA	BEL	POL	GRE
2017	(Germany); Berlin	Aug 18-26	RUS	ESP	ENG	FRA	TUR	GER	ITA	BEL	ROU	GEO
2019	(Italy); Rome	Sep 17-24	ESP	FRA	ENG	TUR	RUS	ITA	GER	BEL	ROU	GRE
2022	(Italy); Pescara	Jun 7-18	FRA	TUR	ENG	GER	ITA	GRE	POL	ROU	ESP	CZE

=== Medals summary ===
Rank	Nation	Gold	Silver	Bronze	Total
1	Spain	7	2	2	11
2	France	3	3	2	8
3	Turkey	1	1	1	3
4	Russia	1	1	0	2
5	England	0	2	5	7
6	United Kingdom	0	2	1	3
7	Greece	0	1	1	2
Totals (7 entries)		12	12	12	36

=== Division B ===
2017: 2019: 2021:

Year	Venue	Date	1st	2nd	3rd	4th	5th	6th	7th	8th	9th	10th
2017	(Romania); Bacau	Apr 3-9	ROU	GEO	GRE	CZE	ALB	IRL	MDA			
2019	(Romania); Bucharest	Mar 26-30	ROU	GRE	GEO	BLR						
2021	(Romania); Bucharest	Sep 25-28	ROU	GRE	POL	ALB						

=== Euro Challenge Cup ===
2014: 2016: 2018: 2022:

Year	Venue	Date	1st	2nd	3rd	4th	5th	6th	7th	8th	9th	10th
2014	(Czech Republic); Prague	Jul 10-12	BEL	CZE	POL	HUN	MDA	ROU				
2016	(Greece); Thessaloniki	May 5-7	ROU	GEO	MDA	HUN	ALB	RUS Youth				
2018	(Poland); Kraków	May 10-12	POL	IRE	HUN	BLR	AUT	SWI				
2022	(Sweden); Stockholm	Jul 6-10	SWI	AUT	SWE	ARM						

== Women's B1 Category ==
2022:

Year	Venue	Date	1st	2nd	3rd	4th	5th	6th	7th	8th	9th	10th
2022	(Italy); Pescara	Jun 1-6	GER	ENG								

=== Medals summary ===
Rank	Nation	Gold	Silver	Bronze	Total
1	Germany	1	0	0	1
2	England	0	1	0	1
Totals (2 entries)		1	1	0	2

== Men's B2/B3 Category ==
1997: 1999: 2001: 2007: 2009: 2012: 2014: 2016: 2018: 2024:

Year	Venue	Date	1st	2nd	3rd	4th	5th	6th	7th	8th	9th	10th
1997	(Spain); Barcelona	Sep 16-20	ESP	ITA	BLR	GBR	IRE					
1999	(Belarus); Minsk	Oct 9-16	ESP	BLR	GBR	ITA	FRA	RUS	GRE	UKR		
2001	(France); Paris	Jun 29 - Jul 8	BLR	Unknown	UKR							
2007	(Turkey); Antalya	Dec 2-8	BLR	RUS	ESP	UKR	ENG and Unknown		ITA and Unknown		TUR and Unknown	
2009	(France); Nantes	Jun 29 - Jul 4	BLR	UKR	ESP	FRA	IRL	ENG	ITA	TUR		
2012	(Turkey); Kayseri	Jun 4-9	BLR	ESP	UKR	ENG	RUS	ITA	TUR			
2014	(Italy); La Spezia	Dec 13-16	ESP	RUS	UKR	ENG	ITA	TUR	AUT			
2016	(Turkey); Antalya	Dec 10-16	UKR	FRA	GBR	TUR	ESP					
2018	(Georgia (country)); Tbilisi	Dec 7-14	UKR	RUS	ENG	ITA	TUR	GEO				
2024	(Turkey); Antalya	Nov 4-10	ESP	UKR	ENG	TUR	ITA					

=== Medals summary ===
Rank	Nation	Gold	Silver	Bronze	Total
1	Spain	4	1	2	7
2	Belarus	4	1	1	6
3	Ukraine	2	2	3	7
4	Russia	0	3	0	3
5	France	0	1	0	1
5	Italy	0	1	0	1
7	England	0	0	2	2
7	United Kingdom	0	0	2	2
Totals (8 entries)		10	9	10	29
