= Blind football at the IBSA World Games =

The blind football at the IBSA World Games is an event of blind football at the IBSA World Games.

Football 5-a-side of blind football is a variation of association football designed for players who are blind or visually impaired.

== Results ==
Men's B1

Year	Venue	Winners	Score	Runners-up	Third place	Score	Fourth place	Number of teams
2007; Details	(Brazil); São Paulo	Brazil	2–0	Argentina	Spain	0–0(1–0 p)	Japan	4
2011; Details	(Turkey); Antalya	Iran	3–0	France	China	3–0	England	7
2015; Details	(South Korea); Seoul	Argentina	2–1	United Kingdom	Spain	1–0	China	9
2023	(United Kingdom); Birmingham	See 2023 IBSA Men's World Blind Football Championship			See 2023 IBSA Men's World Blind Football Championship			16

Men's B2/B3

Year	Venue	Winners	Score	Runners-up	Third place	Score	Fourth place	Number of teams
2007; Details	(Brazil); São Paulo	Belarus	1–1 (3–2 p)	Ukraine	Spain	4–0	Brazil	4
2011; Details	(Turkey); Antalya	Belarus	5–1	Ukraine	Spain	7–4	England	9
2015; Details	(South Korea); Seoul	Ukraine	3–1	Spain	Italy	2–1	Japan	5

== See also ==
- IBSA World Games
- Paralympic football
