= IBSA Blind Football Asian Championships =

Biannual sport event

The IBSA Blind Football Asian Championships is a sport event, held biannually for Asian and Oceanic men's and women's blind football national teams. In the men's tournament, China holds a record of six titles won, making them the most successful national team at the championship. The women's tournament only started on 2022, which saw Japan earn their first title in the two-team contested edition.

== Winners overview ==
=== Men's B1 ===
Year	Venue	Winners	Score	Runners-up	Third place	Score	Fourth place	Teams
2005; Details	(Vietnam); Ho Chi Minh City	Japan	— (Note: The tournament was played in a round-robin format)	South Korea	Vietnam	—	none	3
2007; Details	(South Korea); Seoul	China	3–0	South Korea	Iran	1–0	Japan	4
2009; Details	(Japan); Tokyo	China	2–0	Japan	South Korea	0–0 (a.e.t.) (1–0 p.)	Iran	5
2011; Details	(Japan); Sendai	China	1–0	Iran	Japan	2–0	South Korea	4
2013; Details	(China); Beijing	China	0–0 (a.e.t.) (3–2 p.)	Japan	South Korea	— (Note: The knockout stage format was only played between 2 clubs, in the Final)	—	3
2015; Details	(Japan); Tokyo	Iran	0–0 (a.e.t.) (1–0 p.)	China	South Korea	0–0 (a.e.t.) (2–1 p.)	Japan	6
2017; Details	(Malaysia); Kuala Lumpur	China	2–0	Iran	Thailand	2–0	South Korea	6
2019; Details	(Thailand); Pattaya	China	1–0	Iran	Japan	2–1	Thailand	8
2022; Details	(India); Kochi	China	0–0	Thailand	Japan	0–0	Iran	10

=== Women's B1 ===
Year	Venue	Winners	Score	Runners-up	Third place	Score	Fourth place	Teams
2022; Details	(India); Kochi	Japan	2–0 (1st leg); 1–0 (2nd leg)	India	Not held			2

== Summary ==
Matches in Penalty = Draw / Exclude of Penalty Goals

=== Men (2005-2022) ===
Rank	Team	Part	M	W	D	L	GF	GA	GD	Points
1	China	8	37	27	10	0	81	6	+75	91
2	Japan	9	39	18	11	10	62	25	+37	65
3	Iran	7	34	15	11	8	69	16	+53	56
4	South Korea	9	37	11	8	18	36	58	-22	41
5	Thailand	3	15	6	4	5	26	16	+10	22
6	Malaysia	4	19	4	3	12	11	33	–22	15
7	India	3	16	3	2	11	9	47	–38	11
8	Uzbekistan	1	6	1	0	5	4	27	–23	3
9	Kazakhstan	1	5	0	2	3	1	13	–12	2
10	Vietnam	1	2	0	1	1	0	1	–1	1
11	Oman	1	4	0	1	3	0	16	–16	1
12	Australia	1	5	0	1	4	0	21	–21	1

=== Women (2022-2022) ===
Rank	Team	Part	M	W	D	L	GF	GA	GD	Points
1	Japan	1	2	2	0	0	3	0	+3	6
2	India	1	2	0	0	2	0	3	-3	0

== Medals ==
=== Men (2005-2022) ===
Rank	Nation	Gold	Silver	Bronze	Total
1	China (CHN)	7	1	0	8
2	Iran (IRI)	1	3	1	5
3	Japan (JPN)	1	2	3	6
4	South Korea (KOR)	0	2	3	5
5	Thailand (THA)	0	1	1	2
6	Vietnam (VIE)	0	0	1	1
Totals (6 entries)		9	9	9	27

=== Women (2022-2022) ===
Rank	Nation	Gold	Silver	Bronze	Total
1	Japan (JPN)	1	0	0	1
2	India (IND)	0	1	0	1
Totals (2 entries)		1	1	0	2

== Ranking ==
=== Men ===
Year	1st	2nd	3rd	4th	5th	6th	7th	8th	9th	10th
2005	JPN	KOR	VIE							
2007	CHN	KOR	IRI	JPN						
2009	CHN	JPN	KOR	IRI						
2011	CHN	IRI	JPN	KOR						
2013	CHN	JPN	KOR							
2015	IRI	CHN	KOR	JPN	MAS	IND				
2017	CHN	IRI	THA	KOR	JPN	MAS				
2019	CHN	IRI	JPN	THA	IND	MAS	KOR	OMA		
2022	CHN	THA	JPN	IRI	KOR	MAS	IND	UZB	KAZ	AUS

=== Women ===
Year	1st	2nd	3rd	4th	5th	6th	7th	8th	9th	10th
2022	JPN	IND								

== Results ==
=== 2005 ===
1. Japan 2-1 South Korea
2. South Korea 1-0 Vietnam
3. Japan 0-0 Vietnam

=== 2007 ===
1. Japan 0-0 China
2. South Korea 2-0 Iran
3. Japan 0-0 Iran
4. China 4-1 South Korea
5. Japan 0-1 South Korea
6. Iran 0-0 China
7. Iran 1-0 Japan
8. China 3-0 South Korea

=== 2009 ===
1. China 1-0 Japan
2. Malaysia 0-3 South Korea
3. China 1-0 Iran
4. Japan 5-0 Malaysia
5. Iran 0-1 South Korea
6. China 4-1 South Korea
7. Japan 0-0 Iran
8. China 3-0 Malaysia
9. Iran 3-0 Malaysia
10. Japan 2-1 South Korea
11. South Korea 0-0 Iran (Penalty 1–0)
12. China 2-0 Japan

=== 2011 ===
1. China 2-0 Japan
2. South Korea 1-1 Iran
3. China 1-0 Iran
4. Japan 2-1 South Korea
5. Iran 2-0 Japan
6. South Korea 0-0 China
7. Japan 2-0 South Korea
8. China 1-0 Iran

=== 2013 ===
1. China 0-0 South Korea
2. Japan 2-0 South Korea
3. China 2-0 Japan
4. China 0-0 Japan (Penalty 3–2)

=== 2015 ===
1. India 0-6 South Korea
2. Malaysia 0-5 Iran
3. Japan 0-1 China
4. Malaysia 1-0 India
5. China 1-0 South Korea
6. Iran 0-0 Japan
7. China 2-0 Malaysia
8. Iran 10-0 India
9. South Korea 0-2 Japan
10. Iran 0-0 China
11. Japan 5-0 India
12. South Korea 1-0 Malaysia
13. India 0-5 China
14. South Korea 0-4 Iran
15. Japan 2-0 Malaysia
16. Malaysia 1-0 India
17. South Korea 0-0 Japan (Penalty 2–1)
18. Iran 0-0 China (Penalty 1–0)

=== 2017 ===
1. China 2-1 Thailand
2. Iran 3-0 South Korea
3. Iran 2-0 Malaysia
4. China 3-0 Japan
5. Japan 2-2 Thailand
6. South Korea 4-3 Malaysia
7. China 6-0 South Korea
8. Iran 1-1 Thailand (Penalty 3–2)
9. Japan 2-1 Malaysia
10. Thailand 2-0 South Korea
11. China 2-0 Iran

=== 2019 ===
1. Japan 5-0 Oman
2. Iran 4-0 Malaysia
3. Thailand 6-0 India
4. China 8-0 South Korea
5. Iran 10-0 Oman
6. Japan 1-0 Malaysia
7. Thailand 4-0 South Korea
8. China 5-0 India
9. Malaysia 1-0 Oman
10. China 2-0 Thailand
11. Japan 0-1 Iran
12. India 0-0 South Korea
13. South Korea 0-0 Oman (Penalty 1–0)
14. Iran 3-2 Thailand
15. China 2-2 Japan (Penalty 3–2)
16. India 2-0 Malaysia
17. Japan 2-1 Thailand
18. China 1-0 Iran
