= Paralympic football =

Adaptations of association football for athletes with a physical disability

Paralympic football consists of adaptations of the para football, the sport of association football for athletes with a physical disability. These sports are typically played using International Federation of Association Football (FIFA) rules, with modifications to the field of play, equipment, numbers of players, and other rules as required to make the game suitable for the athletes.

The two most prominent versions of Paralympic football are 5-a-side football for athletes with visual impairments, and 7-a-side football for athletes with cerebral palsy.

== Blind football (5-a-side) ==
5-a-side football, also known as blind futsal and blind football, is an adaptation of football for athletes with visual impairments including blindness. The sport, governed by the International Blind Sports Federation (IBSA), is played with modified FIFA rules. The field of play is smaller, and is surrounded by boards. Teams are reduced to five players, including the goalkeeper, per team. Teams may also use one guide, who is positioned off the field of play, to assist in directing players. The ball is equipped with a noise-making device to allow players to locate it by sound. Matches consist of two 20-minute halves, with a ten-minute break at half-time.

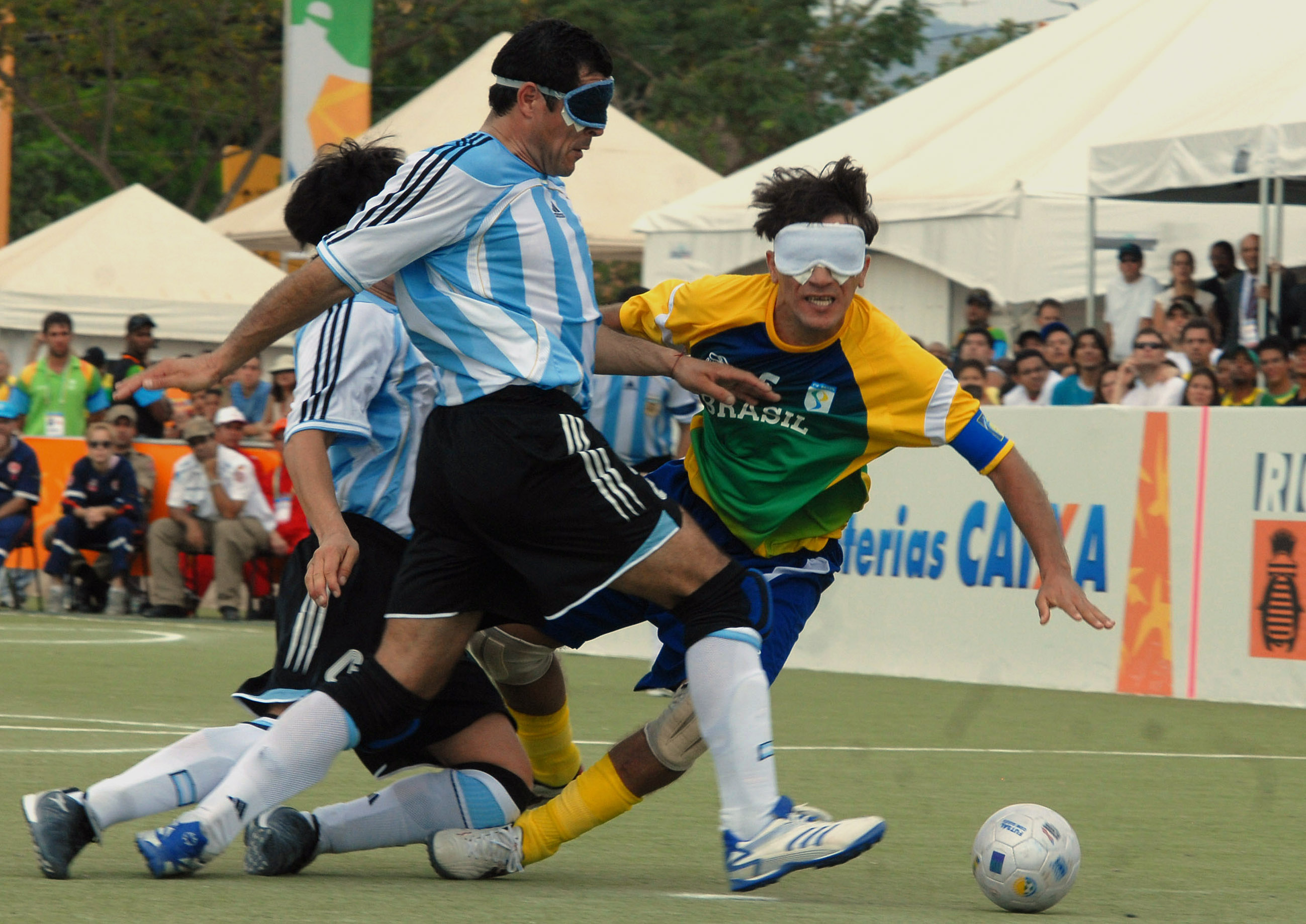
Brazil vs. Argentina in the Final of the Football for 5 at the 2007 Parapan American Games in Rio de Janeiro

Football 5-a-side players are assigned to one of three sport classes based on their level of visual impairment:

- B1 - Totally or almost totally blind; from no light perception up to light perception but inability to recognise the shape of a hand.
- B2 - Partially sighted; able to recognise the shape of a hand up to a visual acuity of 2/60 or a visual field of less than 5 degrees.
- B3 - Partially sighted; visual acuity from 2/60 to 6/60 or visual field from 5 to 20 degrees

Teams are permitted to use sighted athletes as goalkeepers and guides; sighted goalkeepers cannot have been registered with FIFA for at least five years.

Two types of competition exist. For Class B1 games, only athletes with sport class B1 are permitted as players, with the exception of the goalkeepers and the guides, who may be class B2, B3, or sighted. For Class B2/B3 games, teams can field players in sport classes B2 and B3; at least two B2 players must be on the field at all times.

5-a-side football in Europe was developed in Spain. The first Spanish national championships took place in Spain in 1986. In South America, there are records of a Brazilian Tournament organized in 1980. European and American Championships took place in 1997, followed by the first World Championships in 1998. The sport was added to the Summer Paralympic Games in 2004.

=== Blind football competitions ===
- World Blind Football Championships
- Blind football at the IBSA World Games
- IBSA Blind Football European Championships
- IBSA Blind Football Asian Championships
- IBSA Blind Football American Championships
- IBSA Blind Football African Championships
- Football 5-a-side at the Summer Paralympics
- Football 5-a-side at the Asian Para Games
- Football 5-a-side at the ASEAN Para Games
- Football 5-a-side at the Parapan American Games

== Cerebral palsy football (7-a-side) ==
7-a-side football is an adaptation of association football for athletes with cerebral palsy and other neurological disorders, including stroke and traumatic brain injury. The sport is governed by the Cerebral Palsy International Sports and Recreation Association (CP-ISRA). The sport is played with modified FIFA rules. Among the modifications are a reduced field of play, a reduction in the number of players, elimination of the offside rule, and permission for one-handed throw-ins. Matches consist of two thirty-minute halves, with a fifteen-minute half-time break.

Players competing in 7-a-side football are given a sport class based on their level of disability. Eligible classes are:

- C5: Athletes with difficulties when walking and running, but not in standing or when kicking the ball.
- C6: Athletes with control and co-ordination problems of their upper limbs, especially when running.
- C7: Athletes with hemiplegia.
- C8: Minimally disabled athletes; they must meet eligibility criteria and have an obvious impairment that has impact on the sport of football.

Teams must field at least one class C5 or C6 player at all times. No more than one players of class C8 are permitted to play at the same time.

International competition in 7-a-side football began at the 1978 CP-ISRA International Games in Edinburgh, Scotland. The sport was added to the Summer Paralympic Games at the 1984 Summer Paralympics in New York City, U.S., and has been played at every Summer Games until 2016 Summer Paralympics.

=== Cerebral palsy football competitions ===
- Football at the Cerebral Palsy Games
- IFCPF CP Football World Championships
- IFCPF CP Football European Championships
- IFCPF CP Football Americas Championship
- IFCPF CP Football Asia-Oceana Championship
- Football 7-a-side at the Summer Paralympics
- Football 7-a-side at the ASEAN Para Games
- Football 7-a-side at the Asian Para Games
- Football 7-a-side at the Parapan American Games
