= 2019 World Para Athletics Championships – Women's shot put =

The women's shot put at the 2019 World Para Athletics Championships was held in Dubai in November 2019.

== Medalists ==
Event	Gold		Silver		Bronze	
F12	Assunta Legnante; Italy	15.83 SB	Safiya Burkhanova; Uzbekistan	14.97 CR	Rebeca Valenzuela Álvarez; Mexico	12.99
F20	Sabrina Fortune; United Kingdom	13.91 CR	Anastasiia Mysnyk; Ukraine	13.48 PB	Gloria Agblemagnon; France	12.96
F32	Anastasiia Moskalenko; Ukraine	6.92 CR	Evgeniia Galaktionova; Russia	6.67 PB	Mounia Gasmi; Algeria	6.22 PB
F33	Lucyna Kornobys; Poland	7.81 WR	Svetlana Krivenok; Russia	7.23 PB	Fouzia El Kassioui; Morocco	6.42 AR
F34	Zou Lijuan; China	8.76 CR	Saida Amoudi; Morocco	8.09 AR	Vanessa Wallace; United Kingdom	7.66 PB
F35	Mariia Pomazan; Ukraine	12.94	Wang Jun; China	10.94	Marivana Oliveira da Nobrega; Brazil	9.44
F36	Birgit Kober; Germany	11.19 CR	Galina Lipatnikova; Russia	10.36	Wu Qing; China	9.32 SB
F37	Lisa Adams; New Zealand	14.80 WR	Mi Na; China	12.95	Irina Vertinskaya; Russia	11.78 SB
F40	Raja Jebali; Tunisia	8.63 PB	Renata Śliwińska; Poland	8.62	Lauritta Onye; Nigeria	8.00
F41	Raoua Tlili; Tunisia	10.33 CR	Antonella Ruiz Diaz; Argentina	9.49 AR	Claire Keefer; Australia	9.19 AR
F54	Francisca Mardones Sepulveda; Chile	8.19 WR	Mariia Bogacheva; Russia	7.64 SB	Gloria Zarza Guadarrama; Mexico	7.47
F57	María de los Ángeles Ortiz; Mexico	10.61 SB	Nassima Saifi; Algeria	10.32 SB	Safia Djelal; Algeria	10.10
F64	Yao Juan; China	10.90	Faustyna Kotłowska; Poland	9.71 AR	Martina Simonova; Czech Republic	9.13
WR world record | AR area record | CR championship record | GR games record | NR national record | OR Olympic record | PB personal best | SB season best | WL world leading (in a given season)

== Detailed results ==
=== F12 ===
The event was held on 8 November.

Rank	Athlete	1	2	3	4	5	6	Best	Notes
1st place, gold medalist(s)	Assunta Legnante; Italy	14.62	X	15.45	15.83	14.92	15.45	15.83	SB
2nd place, silver medalist(s)	Safiya Burkhanova; Uzbekistan	14.19	14.35	14.97	14.38	14.27	X	14.97	CR
3rd place, bronze medalist(s)	Rebeca Valenzuela Álvarez; Mexico	12.88	12.79	X	12.67	12.44	12.99	12.99	
4	Zhao Yuping; China	12.38	12.18	12.30	12.61	12.04	11.70	12.61	SB
5	Sofia Oksem; Russia	11.24	11.65	11.47	11.67	11.44	9.84	11.67	
6	Natalija Eder; Austria	10.36	X	10.70	9.38	10.50	11.39	11.39	PB
7	Lydia Church; United Kingdom	11.10	11.25	10.65	10.93	10.44	10.50	11.25	
8	Tamara Sivakova; Belarus	10.67	10.44	10.04	10.06	10.22	10.07	10.67	
9	Liu Ya-ting; Chinese Taipei	10.35	10.10	10.23				10.35	
10	Zhang Liangmin; China	9.93	X	9.77				9.93	
11	Tang Hongxia; China	9.57	9.37	9.18				9.57	
12	Izabela Campos; Brazil	8.97	X	9.18				9.18	
13	Florencia Belen Romero; Argentina	8.99	8.77	8.66				8.99	

=== F20 ===
The event was held on 14 November.

Rank	Athlete	1	2	3	4	5	6	Best	Notes
1st place, gold medalist(s)	Sabrina Fortune; United Kingdom	12.32	12.79	13.26	13.12	13.25	13.91	13.91	CR
2nd place, silver medalist(s)	Anastasiia Mysnyk; Ukraine	12.97	X	13.06	12.95	13.31	13.48	13.48	PB
3rd place, bronze medalist(s)	Gloria Agblemagnon; France	12.66	11.95	12.40	12.18	12.76	12.96	12.96	
4	Viktoriia Shpachynska; Ukraine	12.94	X	12.83	X	11.87	12.87	12.94	PB
5	Poleth Méndes; Ecuador	12.73	12.82	12.82	12.44	12.67	12.55	12.82	AR
6	Valasia Kyrgiovanaki; Greece	12.44	12.21	11.39	11.39	12.54	12.29	12.54	PB
7	Aleksandra Zaitseva; Russia	11.26	12.05	11.82	12.45	X	12.43	12.45	
8	Zoi Mantoudi; Greece	11.27	12.10	11.23	11.59	11.62	12.26	12.26	SB
9	Anaís Méndez; Ecuador	11.46	10.42	11.56				11.56	
10	Inês Fernandes; Portugal	10.54	10.85	X				10.85	
11	Eda Yildirim; Turkey	10.41	10.47	10.62				10.62	
12	Brigila Clair; Mauritius	10.38	9.99	X				10.38	
13	Hulda Sigurjonsdottir; Iceland	9.40	9.61	X				9.61	

=== F32 ===
The event was held on 11 November.

Rank	Athlete	1	2	3	4	5	6	Best	Notes
1st place, gold medalist(s)	Anastasiia Moskalenko; Ukraine	6.61	6.49	6.85	6.87	6.92	6.90	6.92	CR
2nd place, silver medalist(s)	Evgeniia Galaktionova; Russia	5.90	6.42	5.00	6.67	5.78	6.04	6.67	PB
3rd place, bronze medalist(s)	Mounia Gasmi; Algeria	5.56	5.88	5.64	5.69	6.22	5.98	6.22	PB
4	Noura Alktebi; United Arab Emirates	5.73	5.48	6.00	5.92	5.68	5.77	6.00	AR
5	Maroua Ibrahmi; Tunisia	5.17	5.39	5.60	5.52	5.63	5.64	5.64	
6	Maria Stamatoula; Greece	X	4.53	X	5.41	X	4.78	5.41	
7	Thekra Alkaabi; United Arab Emirates	4.00	3.92	4.19	4.43	4.47	4.50	4.50	PB
8	Hanna Wichmann; Germany	4.06	4.26	3.90	3.91	3.90	4.15	4.26	
9	Krisztina Kalman; Hungary	X	2.73	X	2.62	2.76	2.59	2.76	

=== F33 ===
The event was held on 15 November.

Rank	Athlete	1	2	3	4	5	6	Best	Notes
1st place, gold medalist(s)	Lucyna Kornobys; Poland	6.98	7.07	7.37	7.81	7.12	7.04	7.81	WR
2nd place, silver medalist(s)	Svetlana Krivenok; Russia	6.69	6.98	6.51	7.19	6.87	7.23	7.23	PB
3rd place, bronze medalist(s)	Fouzia El Kassioui; Morocco	6.34	6.09	6.21	6.03	6.42	5.95	6.42	AR
4	Joanna Oleksiuk; Poland	6.24	6.32	6.20	6.40	6.31	6.32	6.40	PB
5	Maria Strong; Australia	6.35	6.26	5.94	6.06	6.30	6.37	6.37	AR
6	Asmahane Boudjadar; Algeria	6.09	6.32	5.95	6.13	6.31	5.06	6.32	
7	Qian Zao; China	5.93	X	X	X	X	6.18	6.18	AR
8	Sara Hamdi Masoud; Qatar	5.07	3.20	5.22	5.24	5.36	X	5.36	SB
9	Sara Al Senaani; United Arab Emirates	5.27	5.06	5.14	5.33	5.14	5.07	5.33	PB
10	Anthi Liagkou; Greece	4.33	4.46	4.51	X	4.37	4.32	4.51	
11	Aishah Salem Alkhaaldi; United Arab Emirates	3.81	3.80	3.99	3.88	3.75	3.98	3.99	

=== F34 ===
The event was held on 12 November.

Rank	Athlete	1	2	3	4	5	6	Best	Notes
1st place, gold medalist(s)	Zou Lijuan; China	8.38	8.38	8.47	X	8.49	8.76	8.76	CR
2nd place, silver medalist(s)	Saida Amoudi; Morocco	7.99	8.03	8.05	8.01	8.03	8.09	8.09	AR
3rd place, bronze medalist(s)	Vanessa Wallace; United Kingdom	7.25	7.35	7.16	7.52	7.66	7.27	7.66	PB
4	Jessica Gillan; New Zealand	7.34	7.13	7.59	7.47	7.55	7.47	7.59	
5	Marie Brämer-Skowronek; Germany	7.05	7.41	7.27	6.84	7.35	6.98	7.41	PB
6	Charleen Kosche; Germany	6.62	6.92	6.86	6.79	X	6.86	6.92	
7	Basimah Najim; Kuwait	5.68	X	5.75	X	4.75	5.69	5.75	=SB
8	Ansaf Alnuaimi; United Arab Emirates	X	5.52	5.57	X	5.41	5.41	5.57	
9	Thuraya Alzaabi; United Arab Emirates	X	X	5.19	X	5.19	X	5.19	SB

=== F35 ===
The event was held on 14 November.

Rank	Athlete	1	2	3	4	5	6	Best	Notes
1st place, gold medalist(s)	Mariia Pomazan; Ukraine	11.93	12.94	12.16	12.82	X	12.67	12.94	
2nd place, silver medalist(s)	Wang Jun; China	10.32	10.94	X	10.68	10.75	10.88	10.94	
3rd place, bronze medalist(s)	Marivana Oliveira da Nobrega; Brazil	9.30	9.29	9.09	9.04	9.44	8.80	9.44	
4	Anna Nicholson; United Kingdom	7.52	7.93	8.47	7.36	8.00	7.65	8.47	PB
5	Klaudia Maliszewska; Poland	7.76	8.44	8.33	8.16	7.73	7.65	8.44	PB
6	Anna Luxová; Czech Republic	7.51	X	7.46	7.93	7.79	8.18	8.18	

=== F36 ===
The event was held on 12 November.

Rank	Athlete	1	2	3	4	5	6	Best	Notes
1st place, gold medalist(s)	Birgit Kober; Germany	X	X	10.90	11.08	9.99	11.19	11.19	CR
2nd place, silver medalist(s)	Galina Lipatnikova; Russia	10.36	9.30	10.28	9.84	9.12	10.09	10.36	
3rd place, bronze medalist(s)	Wu Qing; China	9.11	9.24	9.18	8.92	9.32	9.01	9.32	SB
4	Juliane Mogge; Germany	8.15	7.28	X	8.44	X	8.99	8.99	
5	Sarah Aljumaah; Saudi Arabia	6.28	6.27	6.84	6.74	6.58	6.53	6.84	PB

=== F37 ===
The event was held on 9 November.

Rank	Athlete	1	2	3	4	5	6	Best	Notes
1st place, gold medalist(s)	Lisa Adams; New Zealand	14.70	13.15	14.45	14.60	X	14.80	14.80	WR
2nd place, silver medalist(s)	Mi Na; China	12.95	12.54	X	12.61	12.45	12.78	12.95	
3rd place, bronze medalist(s)	Irina Vertinskaya; Russia	11.78	11.22	11.36	X	11.42	11.10	11.78	SB
4	Li Yingli; China	11.55	10.51	10.66	11.13	11.50	11.21	11.55	
5	Eva Datinska; Czech Republic	X	10.52	10.47	10.31	X	10.48	10.52	
6	YDJ Cohen Epieyu; Venezuela	9.28	9.60	9.18	9.11	9.28	9.55	9.60	SB
7	Caitlin Dore; New Zealand	9.22	9.12	9.35	9.47	9.10	9.50	9.50	PB
8	Amal Alahmari; Saudi Arabia	4.95	4.75	X	4.60	4.27	X	4.95	PB

=== F40 ===
The event was held on 15 November.

Rank	Athlete	1	2	3	4	5	6	Best	Notes
1st place, gold medalist(s)	Raja Jebali; Tunisia	7.92	8.63	8.31	8.15	8.52	8.34	8.63	CR
2nd place, silver medalist(s)	Renata Śliwińska; Poland	8.01	8.46	8.62	X	8.52	8.36	8.62	
3rd place, bronze medalist(s)	Lauritta Onye; Nigeria	7.81	8.00	X	7.72	X	7.86	8.00	
4	Rima Abdelli; Tunisia	7.79	X	7.36	X	7.38	7.18	7.79	
5	Lara Baars; Netherlands	7.22	X	6.93	7.04	X	7.47	7.47	PB
6	Zhang Fengju; China	7.28	7.24	7.02	7.04	7.19	7.35	7.35	
7	Mary Fitzgerald; Ireland	6.21	5.42	X	6.49	6.87	6.15	6.87	
8	Maryam Alzeyoudi; United Arab Emirates	5.54	5.66	5.97	5.45	6.17	6.03	6.17	
9	Saruultugs Dagvadorj; Mongolia	5.77	5.80	5.74				5.80	
10	Sylvia Shivolo; Namibia	5.71	5.31	5.72				5.72	PB
11	Sebehe Clarisse Lago; Ivory Coast	4.99	X	4.56				4.99	
12	Oxana Spataru; Moldova	4.13	4.57	4.34				4.57	
13	Chimi Dema; Bhutan	4.07	4.13	4.51				4.51	PB

=== F41 ===
The event was held on 14 November.

Rank	Athlete	1	2	3	4	5	6	Best	Notes
1st place, gold medalist(s)	Raoua Tlili; Tunisia	10.33	X	9.51	9.83	9.41	9.62	10.33	CR
2nd place, silver medalist(s)	Antonella Ruiz Diaz; Argentina	8.93	9.49	9.10	X	X	X	9.49	AR
3rd place, bronze medalist(s)	Claire Keefer; Australia	7.80	8.30	9.02	8.97	8.89	9.19	9.19	AR
4	Youssra Karim; Morocco	X	8.83	8.99	8.78	8.79	9.06	9.06	PB
5	Samar Ben Koelleb; Tunisia	8.39	8.41	8.62	8.55	8.26	8.34	8.62	
6	Hayat El Garaa; Morocco	8.07	7.98	7.84	X	8.12	8.06	8.12	
7	Kubaro Khakimova; Uzbekistan	7.57	7.68	7.81	7.53	7.47	7.12	7.81	AR
8	Fathia Amaimia; Tunisia	7.30	7.45	7.42	7.69	7.50	7.27	7.69	
9	Rose Vandegou; France	X	7.30	7.38				7.38	
10	Rabia Cirit; Turkey	6.30	6.88	6.51				6.88	PB
11	Li Wei; China	6.86	6.38	X				6.86	
12	Ana Gradecak; Croatia	6.37	6.83	6.62				6.83	PB
13	Estefany López; Ecuador	6.31	6.35	6.14				6.35	
14	Claudine Uwitije; Rwanda	5.22	4.75	5.60				5.60	PB

=== F54 ===
The event was held on 12 November.

Rank	Athlete	1	2	3	4	5	6	Best	Notes
1st place, gold medalist(s)	Francisca Mardones Sepulveda; Chile	7.45	8.19	7.26	7.26	7.89	7.59	8.19	WR
2nd place, silver medalist(s)	Mariia Bogacheva; Russia	5.15	7.26	7.64	7.62	7.25	7.55	7.64	SB
3rd place, bronze medalist(s)	Gloria Zarza Guadarrama; Mexico	6.88	6.75	7.27	X	7.47	X	7.47	
4	Yang Liwan; China	7.35	7.14	7.22	7.24	7.32	7.09	7.35	
5	Nurkhon Kurbanova; Uzbekistan	X	6.71	X	6.88	6.80	X	6.88	PB
6	Flora Ugwunwa; Nigeria	5.78	6.51	6.47	6.44	6.84	6.49	6.84	PB
7	Yuliya Nezhura; Burkina Faso	6.58	6.44	6.25	6.48	6.24	6.49	6.58	PB
8	Hania Aida; Tunisia	6.05	5.98	6.29	X	5.87	6.11	6.29	
9	Fadhila Nafati; Tunisia	6.10	6.14	6.10	6.28	6.21	5.95	6.28	
10	Amal Ali; Bahrain	5.42	5.28	5.30	5.46	5.49	5.15	5.49	PB

=== F57 ===
The event was held on 13 November.

Rank	Athlete	1	2	3	4	5	6	Best	Notes
1st place, gold medalist(s)	María de los Ángeles Ortiz; Mexico	10.32	10.18	10.36	10.61	X	X	10.61	SB
2nd place, silver medalist(s)	Nassima Saifi; Algeria	9.91	10.24	10.32	X	X	X	10.32	SB
3rd place, bronze medalist(s)	Safia Djelal; Algeria	X	X	10.10	X	X	X	10.10	
4	Xu Mian; China	9.70	9.74	9.90	9.96	10.02	9.63	10.02	AR
5	Mahnaz Amini Nogourani; Iran	9.05	X	X	X	X	9.47	9.47	PB
6	Tian Yuxin; China	9.44	9.34	9.44	X	X	9.10	9.44	
7	Nadia Medjmedj; Algeria	9.26	9.31	9.37	X	X	9.12	9.37	
8	Zhao Ruihua; China	8.93	9.13	8.87	8.77	8.68	8.89	9.13	
9	Mokhigul Khamdamova; Uzbekistan	8.39	X	7.98	X	8.28	8.39	8.39	
10	Tsogtgerel Gendendarjaa; Mongolia	6.87	7.50	7.45	7.60	8.03	8.21	8.21	SB
11	Nguyễn Thị Hải; Vietnam	8.09	7.91	X	X	7.92	8.08	8.09	
12	Arlette Mawe Fokoa; Cameroon	7.39	X	7.79	X	7.47	7.25	7.79	

=== F64 ===
The event was held on 13 November.

Rank	Athlete	1	2	3	4	5	6	Best	Notes
1st place, gold medalist(s)	Yao Juan; China	10.75	10.68	10.90	-	-	-	10.90	
2nd place, silver medalist(s)	Faustyna Kotłowska; Poland	8.97	9.71	9.32	7.68	9.68	9.44	9.71	AR
3rd place, bronze medalist(s)	Martina Simonova; Czech Republic	8.67	9.00	7.83	8.66	8.05	9.13	9.13	
4	Ida Nesse; Norway	8.85	8.78	8.75	9.07	8.75	8.58	9.07	
5	Kristel Walther; Denmark	7.63	7.54	8.25	8.15	X	8.36	8.36	
6	Mandilene Hoffmann; South Africa	7.92	8.24	7.79	8.18	8.20	X	8.24	
7	Sydney Barta; United States	7.01	7.53	6.91	7.07	7.25	7.79	7.79	
8	Litsitso Khotlele; Lesotho	7.02	6.83	7.00	7.10	7.13	7.10	7.13	
9	Sylvia Atieno Olero; Kenya	6.36	6.48	6.18				6.48	

== See also ==
- List of IPC world records in athletics
