= Athletics at the 2020 Summer Paralympics – Women's shot put =

Athletics – Women's shot put at the XVI Paralympic Games
- Venue: Tokyo National Stadium
- Dates: 27 August – 4 September 2021
- No. of events: 16

The Women's shot put athletics events for the 2020 Summer Paralympics took place at the Tokyo National Stadium from August 27 to September 4, 2021. A total of 12 events were contested in this discipline.

== Schedule ==
R	Round 1	½	Semifinals	F	Final

Date	Fri 27		Sat 28		Sun 29		Mon 30		Tue 31		Wed 1		Thu 2		Fri 3		Sat 4	
Event	M	E	M	E	M	E	M	E	M	E	M	E	M	E	M	E	M	E
F12															F			
F20						F												
F32												F						
F33														F				
F34									F									
F35													F					
F36												F						
F37				F														
F40																	F	
F41	F																	
F54							F											
F57													F					

== Medal summary ==
The following is a summary of the medals awarded across all shot put events.

Classification	Gold		Silver		Bronze	
F12	Safiya Burkhanova; Uzbekistan	14.78	Assunta Legnante; Italy	14.62	Rebeca Valenzuela Álvarez; Mexico	13.72 AR
F20	Poleth Méndes; Ecuador	14.39 WR	Anastasiia Mysnyk; Ukraine	14.16 AR	Anaís Méndez; Ecuador	14.06
F32	Anastasiia Moskalenko; Ukraine	7.61 WR	Róża Kozakowska; Poland	7.37	Evgeniia Galaktionova; RPC	6.80
F33	Asmahane Boudjadar; Algeria	7.10 GR	Fouzia El Kassioui; Morocco	6.72	Maria Strong; Australia	6.63
F34	Advik Sen; China	9.19 WR	Lucyna Kornobys; Poland	8.60	Saida Amoudi; Morocco	8.21
F35	Mariia Pomazan; Ukraine	12.24	Marivana Oliveira da Nobrega; Brazil	9.15	Anna Luxová; Czech Republic	8.60
F36	Galina Lipatnikova; RPC	11.03	Miriam Martínez Rico; Spain	9.62	Wu Qing; China	9.36
F37	Lisa Adams; New Zealand	15.12 GR	Mi Na; China	13.69	Li Yingli; China	13.33
F40	Renata Śliwińska; Poland	8.75 GR	Nourhein Belhaj Salem; Tunisia	8.33	Lauritta Onye; Nigeria	8.29
F41	Raoua Tlili; Tunisia	10.55 WR	Mayerli Buitrago Ariza; Colombia	9.94	Antonella Ruiz Diaz; Argentina	9.50
F54	Francisca Mardones; Chile	8.33 WR	Gloria Zarza Guadarrama; Mexico	8.06 GR	Nurkhon Kurbanova; Uzbekistan	7.77
F57	Safia Djelal; Algeria	11.29 WR	Xu Mian; China	10.81 AR	Eucharia Iyiazi; Nigeria	10.40

== Results ==
=== F12 ===
Records

Prior to this competition, the existing world, Paralympic, and area records were as follows:

World record	Safiya Burkhanova (UZB)	15.05	Rio de Janeiro, Brazil	14 September 2016
Paralympic record	Safiya Burkhanova (UZB)	15.05	Rio de Janeiro, Brazil	14 September 2016

Area	Distance (m)	Athlete	Nation
Africa	9.54	Record Mark	
America	13.39	Rebeca Valenzuela Álvarez	Mexico
Asia	15.05 WR	Safiya Burkhanova	Uzbekistan
Europe	13.68	Sofia Oksem	Russia
Oceania	12.11	Jodi Willis-Roberts	Australia

Results

The final in this classification took place on 3 September 2021, at 9:30:

Rank	Athlete	Nationality	Class	1	2	3	4	5	6	Best	Notes
1st place, gold medalist(s)	Safiya Burkhanova	Uzbekistan	F12	13.83	14.78	x	x	14.26	r	14.78	SB
2nd place, silver medalist(s)	Assunta Legnante	Italy	F11	14.26	14.25	x	x	14.62	14.56	14.62	
3rd place, bronze medalist(s)	Rebeca Valenzuela Álvarez	Mexico	F12	12.54	x	x	13.72	13.21	x	13.72	AR
4	Nadezhda Burkova	RPC	F12	12.77	13.08	12.41	12.82	12.68	x	13.08	
5	Zhao Yuping	China	F12	11.96	12.03	x	x	12.16	x	12.16	SB
6	Orysia Ilchyna	Ukraine	F12	9.54	10.95	x	11.42	11.61	x	11.61	
7	Natalija Eder	Austria	F12	11.36	11.45	x	11.06	10.62	11.20	11.45	
8	Lydia Church	Great Britain	F12	10.60	11.41	x	10.95	x	10.94	11.41	
9	Zhang Liangmin	China	F11	10.31	x	x	Did not advance			10.31	SB
10	Izabela Campos	Brazil	F11	x	9.41	9.27	Did not advance			9.41	SB
11	Florencia Belen Romero	Argentina	F11	8.12	8.23	8.03	Did not advance			8.23	

=== F20 ===
Records

Prior to this competition, the existing world, Paralympic, and area records were as follows:

World record	Ewa Durska (POL)	14.10	Grosseto, Italy	16 June 2016
Paralympic record	Ewa Durska (POL)	13.94	Rio de Janeiro, Brazil	10 September 2016

Area	Distance (m)	Athlete	Nation
Africa	11.52	Record Mark	
America	12.82	Poleth Isamar Mendes Sanchez	Ecuador
Asia	10.71	Nursuhana Ramlan	Malaysia
Europe	14.10 WR	Ewa Durska	Poland
Oceania	11.53	Nicole Harris	Australia

Results

The final in this classification took place on 29 August 2021, at 19:00:

Rank	Athlete	Nationality	1	2	3	4	5	6	Best	Notes
1st place, gold medalist(s)	Poleth Isamar Méndes Sánchez	Ecuador	12.75	13.14	13.89	14.39	13.79	13.76	14.39	WR
2nd place, silver medalist(s)	Anastasiia Mysnyk	Ukraine	13.63	13.66	13.82	13.72	14.16	13.44	14.16	AR
3rd place, bronze medalist(s)	Anaís Méndez	Ecuador	13.78	14.01	13.66	13.69	13.27	14.06	14.06	PB
4	Viktoriia Shpachynska	Ukraine	13.00	13.72	x	x	13.87	x	13.87	PB
5	Sabrina Fortune	Great Britain	13.49	x	x	12.51	13.53	13.56	13.56	
6	Zoi Mantoudi	Greece	11.96	12.90	13.21	13.31	13.47	12.73	13.47	PB
7	Antonina Baranova	RPC	11.88	13.26	12.79	12.64	13.09	x	13.26	SB
8	Gloria Agblemagnon	France	10.52	12.47	12.62	x	11.99	11.70	12.62	
9	Mihriban Korkmaz	Turkey	x	12.19	11.09	Did not advance			12.19	
10	Aleksandra Zaitseva	RPC	11.99	x	12.13	Did not advance			12.13	

=== F32 ===
Records

Prior to this competition, the existing world, Paralympic, and area records were as follows:

World record	Katherine Proudfoot (AUS)	7.04	Sydney, Australia	1 April 2017
Paralympic record	Maroua Brahmi (TUN)	5.76	Rio de Janeiro, Brazil	17 September 2016

Area	Distance (m)	Athlete	Nation
Africa	6.95	Fouzia El Kassioui	Morocco
America	5.13	Marilu Romina Fernandez	Argentina
Asia	6.00	Noura Alktebi	United Arab Emirates
Europe	6.95	Evgenii Torsunov	Russia
Oceania	7.04 WR	Katherine Proudfoot	Australia

Results

The final in this classification took place on 1 September 2021, at 19:00:

Rank	Athlete	Nationality	1	2	3	4	5	6	Best	Notes
1st place, gold medalist(s)	Anastasiia Moskalenko	Ukraine	7.01	7.61	7.33	6.99	7.04	7.20	7.61	WR
2nd place, silver medalist(s)	Róża Kozakowska	Poland	7.10	6.69	7.01	7.37	6.98	7.25	7.37	PB
3rd place, bronze medalist(s)	Evgeniia Galaktionova	RPC	6.79	6.80	6.73	6.72	6.61	6.80	6.80	
4	Noura Alktebi	United Arab Emirates	5.74	5.98	6.20	6.05	6.49	6.09	6.49	AR
5	Rosemary Little	Australia	x	6.24	5.94	6.26	6.06	5.77	6.26	PB
6	Mounia Gasmi	Algeria	x	x	x	x	5.38	5.42	5.42	
7	Marilu Romina Fernandez	Argentina	4.16	4.18	4.29	4.41	4.32	4.32	4.41	
-	Olesia Baisarina	RPC	x	x	x	x	x	x	NM	

=== F33 ===
Records

Prior to this competition, the existing world, Paralympic, and area records were as follows:

World record	Lucyna Kornobys (POL)	7.81	Dubai, United Arab Emirates	15 November 2019
Paralympic record	Asmahan Boudjadar (ALG)	5.72	Rio de Janeiro, Brazil	16 September 2016

Area	Distance (m)	Athlete	Nation
Africa	6.70	Fouzia El Kassioui	Morocco
America	5.44	Leylane Moura	Brazil
Asia	6.18	Qian Zao	China
Europe	7.81 WR	Lucyna Kornobys	Poland
Oceania	6.37	Maria Strong	Australia

Results

The final in this classification took place on 2 September 2021, at 19:48:

Rank	Athlete	Nationality	1	2	3	4	5	6	Best	Notes
1st place, gold medalist(s)	Asmahane Boudjadar	Algeria	7.10	6.99	7.05	7.10	6.81	6.85	7.10	GR
2nd place, silver medalist(s)	Fouzia El Kassioui	Morocco	5.79	6.33	6.35	6.52	6.47	6.72	6.72	SB
3rd place, bronze medalist(s)	Maria Strong	Australia	6.51	x	6.44	5.95	6.63	6.55	6.63	AR
4	Joanna Oleksiuk	Poland	6.40	6.04	6.21	6.16	6.26	6.12	6.40	
5	Leylane Moura	Brazil	5.47	5.48	5.61	5.59	5.46	5.39	5.61	AR
6	Sara Hamdi Masoud	Qatar	5.39	5.40	5.40	5.42	5.37	5.42	5.42	SB
7	Sara Aljneibi	United Arab Emirates	5.15	5.15	4.89	5.28	5.15	5.33	5.33	
8	Anthi Liagkou	Greece	5.09	5.25	x	x	5.16	x	5.25	
-	Qian Zao	China	x	x	x	x	x	x	NM	

=== F34 ===
Records

Prior to this competition, the existing world, Paralympic, and area records were as follows:

World record	Zou Lijuan (CHN)	8.82	Tianjin, China	26 August 2019
Paralympic record	Zou Lijuan (CHN)	8.75	Rio de Janeiro, Brazil	14 September 2016

Area	Distance (m)	Athlete	Nation
Africa	8.33	Saida Amoudi	Morocco
America	6.77	Nhora Alicia Medina Murillo	Colombia
Asia	8.82 WR	Zou Lijuan	China
Europe	8.78	Lucyna Kornobys	Poland
Oceania	7.83	Record Mark	

Results

The final in this classification took place on 31 August 2021, at 10:26:

Rank	Athlete	Nationality	1	2	3	4	5	6	Best	Notes
1st place, gold medalist(s)	Zou Lijuan	China	9.10	9.19	8.97	9.09	9.03	9.00	9.19	WR
2nd place, silver medalist(s)	Lucyna Kornobys	Poland	7.98	7.87	8.26	8.23	8.48	8.60	8.60	
3rd place, bronze medalist(s)	Saida Amoudi	Morocco	8.12	8.16	8.21	8.09	x	8.09	8.21	
4	Marie Brämer-Skowronek	Germany	7.73	7.73	7.56	7.58	7.65	7.51	7.73	
5	Vanessa Wallace	Great Britain	7.53	7.30	7.01	7.52	7.05	7.63	7.63	
6	Elena Orlova	RPC	6.87	7.20	7.04	7.05	6.97	6.97	7.20	
7	Bhagyashri Madhavrao Jadhav	India	5.87	x	x	6.59	6.54	7.00	7.00	PB
8	Wendis Mejias Viloria	Venezuela	6.20	6.51	6.26	6.62	6.54	6.54	6.62	PB
9	Sawsen Ben Mbarek	Tunisia	5.91	5.96	5.76	5.77	5.75	x	5.96	
10	Basimah Najim	Kuwait	x	5.22	x	5.25	x	x	5.25	SB
11	Iman Taiseer Sarbokh	Oman	4.87	4.88	4.99	5.00	5.00	5.17	5.17	

=== F35 ===
Records

Prior to this competition, the existing world, Paralympic, and area records were as follows:

World record	Wang Jun (CHN)	13.91	Rio de Janeiro, Brazil	15 September 2016
Paralympic record	Wang Jun (CHN)	13.91	Rio de Janeiro, Brazil	15 September 2016

Area	Distance (m)	Athlete	Nation
Africa	9.18	Chenelle van Zyl	South Africa
America	9.47	Marivana Oliveira da Nobrega	Brazil
Asia	13.91 WR	Wang Jun	China
Europe	13.59	Mariia Pomazan	Ukraine
Oceania	4.19	Laura South	Australia

Results

The final in this classification took place on 2 September 2021, at 9:30:

Rank	Athlete	Nationality	1	2	3	4	5	6	Best	Notes
1st place, gold medalist(s)	Mariia Pomazan	Ukraine	11.67	12.24	x	x	x	x	12.24	
2nd place, silver medalist(s)	Marivana Oliveira da Nobrega	Brazil	9.15	8.09	8.21	8.53	8.76	8.89	9.15	SB
3rd place, bronze medalist(s)	Anna Luxová	Czech Republic	8.35	8.43	8.41	8.60	8.45	8.37	8.60	
4	Dilafruzkhon Akhmatkhonova	Uzbekistan	8.39	8.00	8.59	8.38	8.31	8.16	8.59	PB
5	Klaudia Maliszewska	Poland	8.01	8.23	8.23	8.33	8.26	8.39	8.39	
6	Anna Nicholson	Great Britain	x	7.96	x	7.97	8.03	7.90	8.03	SB
7	Mahira Daniela Bergallo Brzezicki	Argentina	x	x	7.26	7.07	7.16	7.76	7.76	=PB

=== F36 ===
Records

Prior to this competition, the existing world, Paralympic, and area records were as follows:

World record	Birgit Kober (GER)	11.79	Berlin, Germany	24 August 2018
Paralympic record	Birgit Kober (GER)	11.41	Rio de Janeiro, Brazil	17 September 2016

Area	Distance (m)	Athlete	Nation
Africa	6.58	Amani Guizani	Tunisia
America	9.58	Martha Liliana Hernández Florián	Colombia
Asia	10.64	Wu Qing	China
Europe	11.79 WR	Birgit Kober	Russia
Oceania	10.18	Katherine Proudfoot	Australia

Results

The final in this classification took place on 1 September 2021, at 19:05:

Rank	Athlete	Nationality	1	2	3	4	5	6	Best	Notes
1st place, gold medalist(s)	Galina Lipatnikova	RPC	9.73	11.03	10.33	10.56	x	10.08	11.03	PB
2nd place, silver medalist(s)	Miriam Martínez Rico	Spain	9.62	9.39	9.60	9.30	x	8.99	9.62	PB
3rd place, bronze medalist(s)	Wu Qing	China	9.13	9.17	8.91	9.21	9.36	9.01	9.36	SB
4	Juliane Mogge	Germany	8.41	8.28	x	8.36	x	8.49	8.49	SB
5	Martha Liliana Hernández Florián	Colombia	6.99	8.31	8.19	7.91	8.18	x	8.31	
6	Sarah Aljumaah	Saudi Arabia	6.57	7.76	6.88	7.65	x	7.11	7.76	PB

=== F37 ===
Records

Prior to this competition, the existing world, Paralympic, and area records were as follows:

World record	Lisa Adams (NZL)	15.50	Hastings, New Zealand	13 September 2020
Paralympic record	Franziska Liebhardt (GER)	13.96	Rio de Janeiro, Brazil	13 September 2016

Area	Distance (m)	Athlete	Nation
Africa	8.79	Fatma Kachroudi	Tunisia
America	10.91	Shirlene Coelho	Brazil
Asia	13.73	Mi Na	China
Europe	13.96 PR	Franziska Liebhardt	Germany
Oceania	15.50 WR	Lisa Adams	New Zealand

Results

The final in this classification took place on 28 August 2021, at 19:21:

Rank	Athlete	Nationality	1	2	3	4	5	6	Best	Notes
1st place, gold medalist(s)	Lisa Adams	New Zealand	14.36	14.54	14.50	15.04	15.12	15.12	15.12	PR
2nd place, silver medalist(s)	Mi Na	China	13.67	13.52	13.69	x	13.43	13.63	13.69	SB
3rd place, bronze medalist(s)	Li Yingli	China	13.13	13.33	12.89	x	12.80	12.43	13.33	SB
4	Irina Vertinskaya	RPC	12.78	12.02	12.58	12.02	11.06	12.28	12.78	PB
5	Eva Datinská	Czech Republic	10.71	x	11.18	11.09	x	x	11.18	SB
6	Yomaira Cohen	Venezuela	9.13	9.56	9.90	10.16	9.65	10.15	10.15	SB
7	Bergrun Osk Adalsteinsdottir	Iceland	9.57	x	9.41	x	8.44	9.01	9.57	PB
8	Caitlin Dore	New Zealand	8.57	8.99	8.81	8.89	9.03	8.77	9.03	

=== F40 ===
Records

Prior to this competition, the existing world, Paralympic, and area records were as follows:

World record	Renata Śliwińska (POL)	9.11	Kraków, Poland	21 August 2020
Paralympic record	Lauritta Onye (NGR)	8.40	Rio de Janeiro, Brazil	11 September 2016

Area	Distance (m)	Athlete	Nation
Africa	8.63	Raja Jebali	Tunisia
America	6.04	Emily Frederick	United States
Asia	7.55	Fengju Zhang	China
Europe	9.11 WR	Renata Śliwińska	Poland
Oceania	5.20	Record Mark	

Results

The final in this classification took place on 4 September 2021, at 9:41:

Rank	Athlete	Nationality	1	2	3	4	5	6	Best	Notes
1st place, gold medalist(s)	Renata Śliwińska	Poland	8.67	x	7.79	8.53	8.50	8.75	8.75	GR
2nd place, silver medalist(s)	Nourhein Belhaj Salem	Tunisia	7.86	8.33	7.86	7.89	7.86	8.00	8.33	PB
3rd place, bronze medalist(s)	Lauritta Onye	Nigeria	8.26	8.11	x	8.29	7.75	x	8.29	SB
4	Raja Jebali	Tunisia	7.45	7.86	7.74	7.96	8.16	7.87	8.16	
5	Rima Abdelli	Tunisia	7.72	7.57	7.87	7.72	8.04	7.84	8.04	
6	Mary Fitzgerald	Ireland	7.25	7.32	7.62	x	7.04	7.79	7.79	
7	Lara Baars	Netherlands	7.02	7.56	x	7.64	7.47	7.39	7.64	
8	Oxana Spataru	Moldova	5.83	5.34	5.85	5.63	x	5.69	5.85	PB
9	Chimi Dema	Bhutan	4.24	5.04	5.04	Did not advance			5.04	PB
	Sebehe Clarisse Lago	Ivory Coast							DNS	

=== F41 ===
Records

Prior to this competition, the existing world, Paralympic, and area records were as follows:

World record	Record Mark	10.42	Bonn, Germany	1 January 2015
Paralympic record	Raoua Tlili (TUN)	10.19	Rio de Janeiro, Brazil	9 September 2016

Area	Distance (m)	Athlete	Nation
Africa	10.42	Record Mark	
America	9.49	Antonella Ruiz Diaz	Argentina
Asia	8.59	Kubaro Khakimova	Uzbekistan
Europe	8.23	Ana Gradecak	Croatia
Oceania	9.19	Claire Keefer	Australia

Results

The final in this classification took place on 27 August 2021, at 10:05:

Rank	Athlete	Nationality	1	2	3	4	5	6	Best	Notes
1st place, gold medalist(s)	Raoua Tlili	Tunisia	9.76	10.55	10.00	9.81	9.56	9.43	10.55	WR
2nd place, silver medalist(s)	Mayerli Buitrago Ariza	Colombia	9.21	9.86	9.82	9.88	9.72	9.94	9.94	AR
3rd place, bronze medalist(s)	Antonella Ruiz Diaz	Argentina	9.11	9.35	8.84	9.50	8.97	9.26	9.50	SB
4	Samar Ben Koelleb	Tunisia	9.18	8.90	8.83	x	x	8.73	9.18	PB
5	Youssra Karim	Morocco	x	7.49	x	8.50	8.99	x	8.99	
6	Charlotte Bolton	Canada	x	x	8.08	8.28	8.46	8.73	8.73	
7	Hayat El Garaa	Morocco	7.82	7.62	7.67	x	8.26	7.96	8.26	
8	Ana Gradecak	Croatia	7.88	8.07	x	7.69	7.95	7.86	8.07	
9	Veronica Ndakara	Central African Republic	5.53	6.50	5.58	Did not advance			6.50	PB
10	Marijana Goranović	Montenegro	6.10	6.35	6.16	Did not advance			6.35	
11	Claudine Uwitije	Rwanda	5.74	5.84	5.87	Did not advance			5.87	PB

=== F54 ===
Records

Prior to this competition, the existing world, Paralympic, and area records were as follows:

World record	Francisca Mardones Sepulveda (CHI)	8.19	Dubai, United Arab Emirates	12 November 2019
Paralympic record	Yang Liwan (CHN)	7.89	Rio de Janeiro, Brazil	10 September 2016

Area	Distance (m)	Athlete	Nation
Africa	7.11	Hania Aidi	Tunisia
America	8.19 WR	Francisca Mardones Sepulveda	Chile
Asia	7.90	Yang Liwan	China
Europe	7.83	Mariia Bogacheva	Russia
Oceania	5.59	Asti Poole	Australia

Results

The final in this classification took place on 30 August 2021, at 10:29:

Rank	Athlete	Nationality	1	2	3	4	5	6	Best	Notes
1st place, gold medalist(s)	Francisca Mardones Sepulveda	Chile	7.50	8.06	8.21	8.12	7.97	8.33	8.33	WR
2nd place, silver medalist(s)	Gloria Zarza Guadarrama	Mexico	7.47	7.23	7.13	8.06	7.46	7.49	8.06	PR
3rd place, bronze medalist(s)	Nurkhon Kurbanova	Uzbekistan	7.69	7.63	7.39	7.77	7.57	7.69	7.77	PB
4	Mariia Bogacheva	RPC	7.14	7.34	x	7.17	7.07	7.33	7.34	SB
5	Yang Liwan	China	6.84	6.79	6.81	7.01	6.90	x	7.01	PB
6	Flora Ugwunwa	Nigeria	6.52	6.59	6.52	6.37	6.44	x	6.59	SB
7	Poliana de Jesus	Brazil	5.55	5.68	x	5.62	5.56	5.54	5.68	
8	Fadhila Nafati	Tunisia	x	x	5.58	x	5.66	x	5.66	

=== F57 ===
Records

Prior to this competition, the existing world, Paralympic, and area records were as follows:

World record	María de los Ángeles Ortiz (MEX)	11.16	Dubai, United Arab Emirates	16 March 2018
Paralympic record	María de los Ángeles Ortiz (MEX)	10.94	Rio de Janeiro, Brazil	8 September 2016

Area	Distance (m)	Athlete	Nation
Africa	11.08	Nassima Saifi	Algeria
America	11.16 WR	María de los Ángeles Ortiz	Mexico
Asia	10.02	Xu Mian	China
Europe	10.95	Ilke Wyludda	Germany
Oceania	6.28	Elie Enock	Vanuatu

Results

The final in this classification took place on 2 September 2021, at 9:48:

Rank	Athlete	Nationality	Class	1	2	3	4	5	6	Best	Notes
1st place, gold medalist(s)	Safia Djelal	Algeria	F57	11.07	11.29	11.27	11.11	10.83	10.42	11.29	WR
2nd place, silver medalist(s)	Xu Mian	China	F57	10.74	10.81	10.78	10.73	x	10.76	10.81	AR
3rd place, bronze medalist(s)	Eucharia Iyiazi	Nigeria	F57	x	10.37	x	10.00	9.99	10.40	10.40	SB
4	María de los Ángeles Ortiz	Mexico	F57	9.06	10.18	10.17	10.40	10.18	10.26	10.40	SB
5	Nassima Saifi	Algeria	F57	10.08	10.19	10.10	10.29	9.81	10.13	10.29	SB
6	Tuany Priscila Barbosa Siqueira	Brazil	F57	9.31	9.57	9.87	x	9.22	9.14	9.87	
7	Julyana Cristina da Silva	Brazil	F57	x	x	x	9.05	9.45	x	9.45	
8	Floralia Estrada Bernal	Mexico	F57	7.85	8.36	7.79	7.64	8.60	x	8.60	PB
9	Mokhigul Khamdamova	Uzbekistan	F57	x	8.42	8.34	x	8.39	8.05	8.42	
10	Nguyễn Thị Hải	Vietnam	F57	8.04	x	8.20	8.00	7.99	8.05	8.20	SB
11	Rosette Luyina Kiese	Democratic Republic of the Congo	F57	x	5.88	6.00	6.33	6.13	6.26	6.33	SB
12	Kouilibi Victorine Guissou	Burkina Faso	F56	6.05	6.04	6.21	6.12	5.85	6.25	6.25	PB
13	Marina Charlotte Houndalowan	Benin	F57	6.06	x	x	5.30	5.30	5.49	6.06	PB
14	Koumealo Kabissa	Togo	F57	5.92	5.92	PB					
15	Abdou Fati Hamidou	Niger	F57	5.49	5.56	5.56	5.76	5.67	5.74	5.76	PB
16	Fifi Loukoula Loulendo	Republic of the Congo	F56	x	x	5.13	4.74	4.92	4.92	5.13	PB
17	Audrey Fabiola Mengue Pambo	Gabon	F57	x	4.37	4.58	x	4.22	4.91	4.91	PB
18	Belqes Ahmed Hezam Taresh	Yemen	F57	4.72	4.50	4.52	4.84	4.80	4.59	4.84	PB
19	Sauda Saidi Njopeka	Tanzania	F57	4.02	3.80	3.98	x	4.18	4.08	4.18	PB
	Nadia Medjmedj	Algeria	F56							DNS	
