= 2023 World Para Athletics Championships – Women's shot put =

The women's shot put events at the 2023 World Para Athletics Championships were held in Paris, France from 9 to 17 July 2023.

== Medalists ==
Event	Gold	Silver	Bronze
F12	Assunta Legnante; Italy	Safiya Burkhanova; Uzbekistan	Zhao Yuping; China
F20	Sabrina Fortune; Great Britain	Poleth Mendes; Ecuador	Viktoriia Shpachynska; Ukraine
F32	Anastasiia Moskalenko; Ukraine	Wanna Brito; Brazil	Rosemary Little; Australia
F33	Asmahan Boudjadar; Algeria	Maria Strong; Australia	Joanna Oleksiuk; Poland
F34	Zou Lijuan; China	Lucyna Kornobys; Poland	Saida Amoudi; Morocco
F35	Mariia Pomazan; Ukraine	Wang Jun; China	Dilafruzkhon Akhmatkhonova; Uzbekistan
F37	Lisa Adams; New Zealand	Li Yingli; China	Mi Na; China
F40	Renata Śliwińska; Poland	Lauritta Onye; Nigeria	Raja Jebali; Tunisia
F41	Raoua Tlili; Tunisia	Kubaro Khakimova; Uzbekistan	Mayerli Buitrago Ariza; Colombia
F46	Noelle Malkamaki; United States	Holly Robinson; New Zealand	Yukiko Saito; Japan
F54	Elizabeth Rodrigues; Brazil	Francisca Mardones; Chile	Nurkhon Kurbanova; Uzbekistan
F57	Safia Djelal; Algeria	Xu Mian; China	Nassima Saifi; Algeria
F64	Yao Juan; China	Goodness Nwachukwu; Nigeria	Samantha Heyison; United States

== Results ==
=== F12 ===
The final of this event took place at 9:12 on 15 Jul 2023 at Charlety Stadium, Paris.

Rank	Athlete	Attempts						Result	Notes
Rank	Athlete	1	2	3	4	5	6	Result	Notes
1st place, gold medalist(s)	Assunta Legnante (ITA)	14.92	14.3	14.64	15.27	15.55	14.37	15.55	
2nd place, silver medalist(s)	Safiya Burkhanova (UZB)	13.05	13.16	13.56	13.54	13.43	13.72	13.72	SB
3rd place, bronze medalist(s)	Yuping Zhao (CHN)	12.19	11.87	12.34	12.16	11.89	12.78	12.78	SB
4	Lydia Church (GBR)	X	X	11.51	11.59	X	X	11.59	
5	Serap Demirkapu (TUR)	10.66	10.12	9.81	10.8	10.44	10.66	10.80	PB
6	Enhui Xue (CHN)	9.89	10	10.44	10.68	9.98	9.63	10.68	PB
7	Ya-Ting Liu (TPE)	9.16	9.99	9.5	9.55	9.84	9.97	9.99	SB
8	Mateu Paula Heras (ESP)	8.69	9.82	9.51	9.76	9.45	9.5	9.82	
9	Izabela Campos (BRA)	X	X	8.95				8.95	
10	Liangmin Zhang (CHN)	8.42	r					8.42	

=== F20 ===
The final of this event took place at 18:51 on 11 Jul 2023 at Charlety Stadium.

Rank	Athlete	Attempts						Result	Notes
Rank	Athlete	1	2	3	4	5	6	Result	Notes
1st place, gold medalist(s)	Sabrina Fortune (GBR)	12.82	13.64	14.01	12.49	X	13.72	14.01	
2nd place, silver medalist(s)	Poleth Mendes (ECU)	13.6		X	12.77	12.79	13.32	13.60	
3rd place, bronze medalist(s)	Viktoriia Shpachynska (UKR)	12.37	12.75	13.16	12.77	12.03	X	13.16	
4	Gloria Agblemagnon (FRA)	X	12.63	12.94	X	12.78	13.11	13.11	
5	Grecely Padilla (ECU)	11.69	12.52	12.93	12.77	12.43	12.43	12.93	
6	Zoi Mantoudi (GRE)	12.34	12.69	12.66	12.65	12.92	12.89	12.92	
7	Anastasiia Mysnyk (UKR)	12.83	12.47	12.51	X	12.83	X	12.83	
8	Eda Yildirim (TUR)	11.55	11.92	11.56	X	12.1	X	12.10	
9	Ebrar Keskin (TUR)	X	11.62	11.91				11.91	
10	Brigila Clair (MRI)	11.86		11.09				11.86	

=== F32 ===
The final of this event took place at 18:34 on 14 Jul 2023 at Charlety Stadium.

Rank	Athlete	Attempts						Result	Notes
Rank	Athlete	1	2	3	4	5	6	Result	Notes
1st place, gold medalist(s)	Anastasiia Moskalenko (UKR)	6.87	7.24	7.5	7.14	7.46	6.83	7.5	CR
2nd place, silver medalist(s)	Wanna Brito (BRA)	6.34	6.45	6.49	6.46	6.8	6.31	6.8	
3rd place, bronze medalist(s)	Rosemary Little (AUS)	5.68	6.33	6.01	5.39	5.79	5.6	6.33	PB
4	Mounia Gasmi (ALG)	5.49	5.71	5.9	5.91	5.73	6.26	6.26	
5	Noura Alktebi (UAE)	6.03	5.74	6.02	5.92	5.88	6.11	6.11	SB
6	Maroua Ibrahmi (TUN)	5.8	5.94	5.84	5.6	5.62	5.82	5.94	
7	Sarah Clifton-Bligh (AUS)	5.02	4.82	5.26	5.02	5.21	5.21	5.26	PB
8	Marilu Fernandez (ARG)	5.01	5.06	5.07	4.77	4.7	4.72	5.07	
9	Thekra Alkaabi (UAE)	4.26	4.39	X	X	4.47	4.51	4.51	

=== F33 ===
The final of this event took place at 18:30 on 15 Jul 2023 at Charlety Stadium.

Rank	Athlete	Attempts						Result	Notes
Rank	Athlete	1	2	3	4	5	6	Result	Notes
1st place, gold medalist(s)	Asmahane Boudjadar (ALG)	6.71	6.63	6.82	6.55	6.44	7.06	7.06	
2nd place, silver medalist(s)	Maria Strong (AUS)	6.82	X	6.79	6.39	6.63	6.28	6.82	
3rd place, bronze medalist(s)	Joanna Oleksiuk (POL)	6.64	6.47	6.7	6.69	6.58	6.47	6.7	
4	Zao Qian (CHN)	6.56	6.56	6.46	6.32	6.14	6.61	6.61	
5	Fouzia El Kassioui (MAR)	6.42	6.27	6.34	X	6.35	6.48	6.48	
6	Sara Aljneibi (UAE)	6.34	6.1	6.07	6.34	6.39	6.33	6.39	
7	Anthi Liagkou (GRE)	5.46	X	5.49	5.21	5.23	X	5.49	
8	Marilu Fernandez (ARG)	5.01	5.06	5.07	4.77	4.7	4.72	5.07	
9	Thekra Alkaabi (UAE)	4.26	4.39	X	X	4.47	4.51	4.51	

=== F34 ===
The final of this event took place at 18:34 on 12 Jul 2023 at Charlety Stadium.

Rank	Athlete	Attempts						Result	Notes
Rank	Athlete	1	2	3	4	5	6	Result	Notes
1st place, gold medalist(s)	Lijuan Zou (CHN)	8.94	8.97	8.97	9.25	8.81	8.7	9.25	WR
2nd place, silver medalist(s)	Lucyna Kornobys (POL)	8.07	8.16	8.49	8.03	8.14	8.23	8.49	SB
3rd place, bronze medalist(s)	Saida Amoudi (MAR)	7.69	7.84	X	7.98	7.94	7.74	7.98	SB
4	Bhagyashri Mahavrao Jadhav (IND)	X	6.63	7.16	6.89	X	7.23	7.23	
5	Ansaf Alnuaimi (UAE)	6.37	6.2	6.62	6.37	6.42	6.46	6.62	SB
6	Dayna Crees (AUS)	5.97	6.13	6.02	6.08	6.26	5.86	6.26	PB
8	Marilu Fernandez (ARG)	5.01	5.06	5.07	4.77	4.7	4.72	5.07	
9	Thekra Alkaabi (UAE)	4.26	4.39	X	X	4.47	4.51	4.51	
10	Brigila Clair (MRI)	11.86		X	11.09			11.86	

=== F35 ===
The final of this event took place at 11:02 on 15 Jul 2023 at Charlety Stadium.

Rank	Athlete	Attempts						Result	Notes
Rank	Athlete	1	2	3	4	5	6	Result	Notes
1st place, gold medalist(s)	Mariia Pomazan (UKR)	12.22	12.49	12.84	11.74	12.04	12.24	12.84	SB
2nd place, silver medalist(s)	Jun Wang (CHN)	10.45	X	10.39	10.39	10.57	10.63	10.63	SB
3rd place, bronze medalist(s)	D Akhmatkhonova (UZB)	8.38	8.8	8.57	8.67	8.84	8.61	8.84	PB
4	Anna Nicholson (GBR)	8.67	8.41	8.58	8.36	8.38	7.96	8.67	PB
5	Anna Luxova (CZE)	8.44	8.58	7.74	X	8.56	8.47	8.58	
6	Klaudia Maliszewska (POL)	7.86	8.41	8.27	X	X	8.14	8.41	SB
7	Mahira Bergallo (ARG)	6.94	7.52	7.7	7.88	7.59	7.27	7.88	SB

=== F37 ===
The event took place on 10 July.

Rank	Athlete	Result	Notes
1st place, gold medalist(s)	Lisa Adams (NZL)	14.84	CR
2nd place, silver medalist(s)	Li Yingli (CHN)	13.46	SB
3rd place, bronze medalist(s)	Mi Na (CHN)	12.50	SB
4	Ella Hose (AUS)	10.01	
5	Eva Datinska (CZE)	9.90	SB
6	Karen Tassi Sanchez (ARG)	9.49	PB
7	Ingeborg Gardarsdottir (ISL)	8.82	

=== F40 ===
The final of this event took place at 9:35 on 17 Jul 2023 at Charlety Stadium.

Rank	Athlete	Attempt						Result	Notes
Rank	Athlete	1	2	3	4	5	6	Result	Notes
1st place, gold medalist(s)	Renata Sliwinska (POL)	8.89	9.21	8.45	8.34	8.69	-	9.21	WR
2nd place, silver medalist(s)	Lauritta Onye (NGR)	8.10	X	8.21	8.72	9.02	8.46	9.02	PB
3rd place, bronze medalist(s)	Raja Jebali (TUN)		8.51	8.70	8.75	8.72	8.82	8.82	PB
4	Lara Baars (NED)	7.72	8.03	8.43	8.53	8.12	8.58	8.58	PB
5	Salem Nourhein Belhaj (TUN)	8.25	7.89	8.37	8.24	8.08	8.25	8.37	
6	Maryam Alzeyoudi (UAE)	8.32	8.21	8.18	8.06	8.11	8.28	8.32	SB
7	Mary Fitzgerald (IRL)	7.47	7.75	7.84	7.81	7.50	7.33	7.84	SB
8	Rabia Cirit (TUR)	7.32	7.25	X	7.01	7.28	7.26	7.32	
9	Saruultugs Dagvadorj (MGL)	6.30	6.30	X				6.30	SB
10	Aida Rzayeva (AZE)	5.72	5.67	5.93				5.93	PB
11	Unurmaa Erdenechimeg (MGL)	5.70	5.90	X				5.90	
—	Josphine Ashivaka (KEN)							DNS	
—	Jeniffer Chepkoech (KEN)							DNS	

=== F41 ===
The event took place on 9 July.

Rank	Athlete	Attempt						Result	Notes
Rank	Athlete	1	2	3	4	5	6	Result	Notes
1st place, gold medalist(s)	Raoua Tlili (TUN)	10.14	X	9.65	9.69	9.6	10.15	10.15	
2nd place, silver medalist(s)	Kubaro Khakimova (UZB)	9.24	9.12	9.83	9.56	9.11	9.57	9.83	AR
3rd place, bronze medalist(s)	Mayerli Buitrago Ariza (COL)	9.26	9.62	9	9.23	9.2	9.35	9.62	SB
4	Antonella Ruiz Diaz (ARG)	9.14	9.24	X	X	8.62	8.95	9.24	
5	Samar Ben Koelleb (TUN)	8.34	X	8.62	8.86	X	X	8.86	
6	Karim Youssra (MAR)	8.26	8.52	8.28	8.72	8.74	8.8	8.80	SB
7	Estefany Lopez (ECU)	7.7	7.57	8.04	8.08	8.35	8.1	8.35	
8	Hayat El Garaa (MAR)	X	6.96	7.76	7.77	X	7.8	7.8	SB
9	Charlotte Bolton (CAN)	6.87	7.12	7.49				7.49	
10	Veronica Ndakara (CAF)	6.55	6.5	6.58				6.58	PB

=== F46 ===
The final of this event took place at 19:25 on 14 Jul 2023 at Charlety Stadium.

Rank	Athlete	Attempt						Result	Notes
Rank	Athlete	1	2	3	4	5	6	Result	Notes
1st place, gold medalist(s)	Noelle Malkamaki (USA)	12.31	13.02	12.61	13.25	13.16	13.32	13.32	WR
2nd place, silver medalist(s)	Holly Robinson (NZL)	10.92	11.59	11.19	X	X	11.27	11.59	AR
3rd place, bronze medalist(s)	Yukiko Saito (JPN)	10.24	10.97	10.98	10.76	11.35	11.42	11.42	
4	Gaiting Shi (CHN)	10.14	10.1	9.62	10.15	10.34	10.49	10.49	PB
5	Juane Le Roux (RSA)	9.97	9.14	X	9.95	8.9	10.47	10.47	AR
6	Suzana Nahirnei (BRA)	9.59	10.37	X	10	10.15	X	10.37	
7	Tiantian Huang (CHN)	9.12	9.95	10.04	10.05	10.24	10.36	10.36	SB
8	Achoura Boukoufa (ALG)	9.78	9.24	10.02	X	9.37	9.38	10.02	PB
9	Jiamin Zhang (CHN)	X	X	9.49				9.49	
10	Seneida Rodriguez (ECU)	9.44	9.35	X				9.44	
11	Roziyakhon Ergasheva (UZB)	8.86	9.42	9.36				9.42	
12	Mariam Almatrooshi (UAE)	9.39	8.71	X				9.39	
13	Eivyde Vainauskaite (LTU)	9.22	9.06	9.01				9.22	PB
14	Saska Sokolov (SRB)	9.09	r					9.09	
15	Maryam Alhamidi (BRN)	8.33	8.61	X				8.61	SB
16	Dorna Longbut (PNG)	6.8	X	6.99				6.99	

=== F54 ===
The final of this event took place at 9:04 on 12 Jul 2023 at Charlety Stadium.

Rank	Athlete	Attempt						Result	Notes
Rank	Athlete	1	2	3	4	5	6	Result	Notes
1st place, gold medalist(s)	Elizabeth Rodrigues (BRA)	7.22	7.34	6.31	7.23	7.75	6.63	7.75	WR
2nd place, silver medalist(s)	Francisca Mardones (CHI)	X	X	7.3	7.44	7.37	7.27	7.44	
3rd place, bronze medalist(s)	Nurkhon Kurbanova (UZB)	7.15	7.05	7.38	7.33	7.3	7.32	7.38	PB
4	Elham Salehi (IRI)	5.91	6.96	7.23	7.1	7.15	X	7.23	
5	Flora Ugwunwa (NGR)	5.51	X	5.05	5.59	5.63	6.2	6.2	
6	Pooja (IND)	5.42	5.42	5.48	5.58	5.37	5.51	5.58	
	Gloria Zarza Guadarrama (MEX)	X	X	X	X	X	X	NM	

=== F57 ===
The final of this event took place at 9:00 on 15 Jul 2023 at Charlety Stadium.

Rank	Athlete	Attempt						Result	Notes
Rank	Athlete	1	2	3	4	5	6	Result	Notes
1st place, gold medalist(s)	Safia Djelal (ALG)	11.57	10.86	11.45	11.5	11	11.37	11.57	WR
2nd place, silver medalist(s)	Xu Mian (CHN)	10.15	10.77	10.55	10.69	10.44	10.25	10.77	SB
3rd place, bronze medalist(s)	Nassima Saifi (ALG)	10.41	10.16	X		X 10.13	10.51	10.51	
4	Maria de los Angeles Ortiz (MEX)	10.19	9.99	10.3	10.44	10.35	10.3	10.44	=SB
5	Eucharia Njideka Iyiazi (NGR)	9.82	X	x	10.1	X	X	10.1	SB
6	Arlette Mawe Fokoa (CMR)	8.89	9.26	9.18	9.36	9.49	9.44	9.49	PB
7	Mokhigul Khamdamova (UZB)	7.41	7.04	7.76	7.43	7.87	8.13	8.13	SB
8	Sarah Mickey (CAN)	6.89	7.03	6.67	7.03	7.27	6.55	7.27	SB
9	Guadalupe Cota Gilda (MEX)	6.24	6.17	6.2	5.94	6.15	6.35	6.35	
10	Nadha Alhumaydani (KSA)	5.65	5.96	5.64	5.47	X	6.02	6.02	SB

=== F64 ===
The final of this event took place at 9:04 on 15 Jul 2023 at Charlety Stadium.

Rank	Athlete	Attempt						Result	Notes
Rank	Athlete	1	2	3	4	5	6	Result	Notes
1st place, gold medalist(s)	Juan Yao (CHN)	11.85	x	11.5	X	X	X	11.85	SB
2nd place, silver medalist(s)	Goodness Nwachukwu (NGR)	10.99	10.77	10.36	11.64	10.56	X	11.64	WR
3rd place, bronze medalist(s)	Samantha Heyison (USA)	10.55	10.76	10.83	10.58	10.57	10.34	10.83	
4	Funmi Oduwaiye (GBR)	10.69	X	X	10.15	X	X	10.69	
5	Faustyna Kotlowska (POL)	10.53	X	X	9.39	9.49	9.92	10.53	CR
6	Las Heras Noraivis De (CUB)	9.84	9.82	10.03	9.92	9.28	9.46	10.03	SB
7	Wagner Lisa Martin (GER)	9.03	8.51	8.06	9.12	8.83	8.89	9.12	PB
8	Alexandra Nouchet (FRA)	8.43	8.5	8.89	8.31	8.26	8.18	8.89	AR
9	Naibili Vatunisolo (FIJ)	8.62	8.79	8.59				8.79	AR
10	Yane Van Der Merwe (RSA)	8.12	8.53	8.54				8.54	SB
11	Regina Edward (PNG)	7.52	8.09	8.2				8.2	SB
