= Athletics at the 2024 Summer Paralympics – Women's shot put F35 =

Women's shot put F35 at the XVII Paralympic Games
- Venue: Stade de France, Paris
- Date: 5 September 2024
- Competitors: 8 from 8 nations

Medalists
| 1st place, gold medalist(s) | | Mariia Pomazan | Ukraine |
| 2nd place, silver medalist(s) | | Wang Jun | China |
| 3rd place, bronze medalist(s) | | Anna Nicholson | Great Britain |

The Athletics at the 2024 Summer Paralympics – Women's shot put F35 event at the 2024 Summer Paralympics in Paris, took place on 5 September 2024.

== Classification ==
F35 athletes throw from a standing position, they may require assistive devices when walking, but not necessarily when standing. They have moderate diplegic impairment.

== Records ==
Prior to the competition, the existing records were as follows:

| World Record | Wang Jun (CHN) | 13.91m | (Brazil) Rio de Janeiro | 15 September 2016 |
| Paralympic Record | Wang Jun (CHN) | 13.91m | (Brazil) Rio de Janeiro | 15 September 2016 |

== Results ==
=== Final ===
The final in this classification took place on 5 September 2024:

| Rank | Athlete | Nationality | 1 | 2 | 3 | 4 | 5 | 6 | Best | Notes |
|---|---|---|---|---|---|---|---|---|---|---|
| 1st place, gold medalist(s) | Mariia Pomazan | Ukraine | 12.75 | 10.40 | 11.37 | 12.20 | 12.27 | 12.09 | 12.75 | SB |
| 2nd place, silver medalist(s) | Wang Jun | China | 11.65 | x | 11.94 | 11.79 | 11.62 | x | 11.94 | |
| 3rd place, bronze medalist(s) | Anna Nicholson | Great Britain | x | 9.44 | x | 9.19 | 8.91 | 9.18 | 9.44 | |
| 4 | Anna Luxova | Czech Republic | 8.69 | 8.99 | 8.91 | 8.26 | 8.80 | 8.48 | 8.99 | PB |
| 5 | Dilafruzkhon Akhmatkhonova | Uzbekistan | 8.87 | 8.98 | 8.85 | 8.97 | x | x | 8.98 | |
| 6 | Klaudia Maliszewska | Poland | 8.53 | x | 8.18 | 8.22 | 8.15 | 7.92 | 8.53 | |
| 7 | Daria Ivanova | Neutral Paralympic Athletes | 7.95 | 7.61 | 7.92 | 7.37 | x | x | 7.95 | |
| 8 | Marivana Oliveira da Nobrega | Brazil | 7.60 | x | 7.40 | 7.45 | 7.94 | 7.70 | 7.94 | |
