= Suzana Nahirnei =

Brazilian para-athlete (born 1994)

Personal information
- Born: July 14, 1994 (age 32) Blumenau, Santa Catarina, Brazil

Sport
- Country: Brazil
- Sport: Para-athletics
- Disability class: F46
- Events: Shot put, javelin throw
- Club: Associação de Paradesporto de Blumenau

Suzana Nahirnei (born 14 July 1994) is a Brazilian para-athlete who competes in field events. She competes in shot put and javelin throw in the F46 classification. She represented Brazil at the 2024 Summer Paralympics. She is a Brazilian record holder in the F46 shot put and has represented Brazil at multiple World Para Athletics Championships.

== Early and personal life ==
Suzana Nahirnei was born on 14 July 1994 in Blumenau, Santa Catarina. She was born with a congenital malformation of her left arm. Nahirnei identifies as LGBTQ.

== Career ==
Nahirnei became involved in para-athletics while attending an association for people with physical disabilities and subsequently began training after receiving an invitation from coaches working in the sport. She is supported by the city of Blumenau, through the Secretariat of Inclusion of Persons with Disabilities and Parasport of Brazil. She competes in the F46 classification for athletes with upper-limb impairments.

In 2022, Nahirnei made her international debut for Brazil at the Nottwil Grand Prix in Switzerland where she won gold medals in both the shot put and javelin throw events in her disability classification. Later that yera, she won the gold medal at the Paralympic Athletics Open in Lima with a throw of 10.02 m (32.9 ft), which moved her to fifth in the world rankings in the women's F46 shot put. In November 2022, Nahirnei represented the Blumenau Parasport Association at an event conducted by the Brazilian Paralympic Committee in Florianópolis. She recorded a throw of 10.45 m (34.3 ft), improving her position to third in the world in the F46 classification.

In 2023, Nahirnei won gold in F46 shot put in the Circuito Brasil Loterias Caixa Para Athletics meet while setting a Brazilian national record in the process. She represented Brazil at the 2023 World Para Athletics Championships in Paris, where she finished sixth in shot put and fifteenth in javelin throw in the women's F46 events. She qualified for the 2024 Summer Paralympics in Paris and competed in the women's F46 shot put. In the competition, she recorded a best throw of 11.43 m (37.5 ft) to finish fifth amongst the 15 competitors. She registered her personal best throw of 12.29 m (40.3 ft) in shot put at the Circuito Brasil Loterias Caixa Para Athletics meet on 29 April 2025. In the 2025 World Para Athletics Championships held in New Delhi, she finished fifth in the women's shot put F46 event with a throw of 12.15 m (39.9 ft).
