= Lisa Adams (athlete) =

New Zealand Paralympic athlete

Personal information
- Born: 18 November 1990 (age 36) Rotorua, New Zealand
- Height: 187 cm (6 ft 2 in)

Sport
- Country: New Zealand
- Sport: Paralympic athletics
- Disability: hemiplegia
- Disability class: F37
- Club: Lake City Athletic Club
- Coached by: Valerie Adams
Medal record
Women's para athletics
Representing New Zealand
Paralympic Games
Gold medal – first place	2020 Tokyo	Shot put F37
Gold medal – first place	2024 Paris	Shot put F37
World Championships
Gold medal – first place	2019 Dubai	Shot put F37
Gold medal – first place	2023 Paris	Shot put F37
Gold medal – first place	2025 New Delhi	Shot put F37

Lisa Adams (born 18 November 1990) is a New Zealand Paralympic F37 shot putter and F38 discus thrower. Adams competed at the 2020 Summer Paralympics in Tokyo, Japan, and won a gold medal in Women's shot put F37, setting four Paralympics records in the process.

== Early life and athletic career ==
Adams was born and grew up in Rotorua, New Zealand. She was diagnosed with left hemiplegia, a form of cerebral palsy, at an early age. She played netball and basketball when she was growing up, and played rugby with the Waikite women's able-bodied team in 2017.

In 2018 she became the first woman to play with the New Zealand men's national team at the Physical Disability Rugby League (PDRL) Commonwealth Championship. She was selected as flag bearer for the championship's opening ceremony.

Adams began competing in para-athletics in 2018 at the age of 28. She became world champion and world record holder in the F37 shot put in 2019, winning a gold medal at the 2019 World Para Athletics Championships.

Adams announced her retirement on 9 April 2024, but returned to competition at the 2025 World Para Athletics Championships announced on 6 August 2025 winning the gold medal in the F37 shot put.

== Personal life ==
Adams is the younger sister of Valerie Adams, who was also her personal coach. Basketball player Steven Adams is her younger brother.
