= Noelle Malkamaki =

American Paralympic athlete (born 2001)

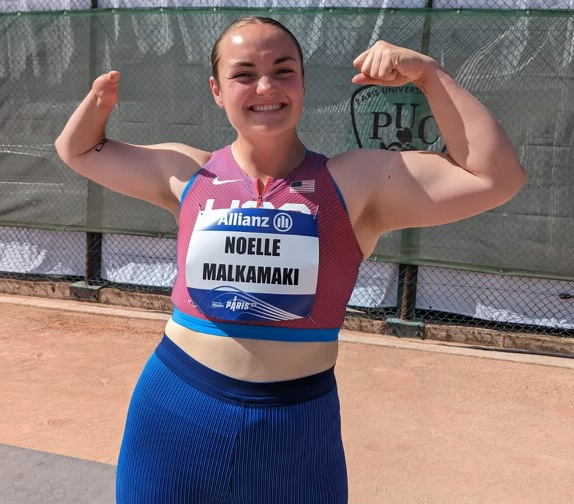
- Malkamaki in 2023

Personal information
- Born: January 9, 2001 (age 25) Decatur, Illinois, U.S.
- Education: DePaul University

Sport
- Sport: Para-athletics
- Disability: Amniotic band syndrome
- Disability class: F46
- Event: Shot put
- Coached by: Brandon Murer

Achievements and titles
- Personal bests: Shot put F46: 14.06 m (46 ft 1 1/2 in) (2024, WR, PR, NR)
Medal record
Para-athletics
Representing the United States
Paralympic Games
Gold medal – first place	2024 Paris	Shot put F46
World Championships
Gold medal – first place	2023 Paris	Shot put F46
Gold medal – first place	2024 Kobe	Shot put F46

Noelle Malkamaki (née DeJaynes; born January 9, 2001) is an American track and field athlete competing in shot put. She represented the United States at the 2024 Summer Paralympics, winning a gold medal in shot put and setting a new world record.

== Early life and education ==
Noelle DeJaynes was born in Decatur, Illinois, to Christopher and Sara DeJaynes. She was born with a congenital birth defect, amniotic band syndrome, which prevented her right hand from developing. She has one sister, Caley.

DeJaynes graduated from St. Teresa High School in 2019, where she participated in volleyball and track and field. During her junior and senior year she helped St. Teresa finish in third place at the Illinois State 1A High School Championships.

Following high school graduation she attended DePaul University, where she competed in track and field. She graduated from DePaul in December 2023 with a degree in English literary studies.

== Career ==
DeJaynes’ first outdoor track and field season at DePaul University was canceled by the COVID-19 pandemic in 2020. After getting married in July 2020, she started competing as Noelle Malkamaki.

At the 2022 U.S. Paralympics Track & Field National Championships, Malkamaki won her first national title and set an American record in the shot put with a throw of 12.18 m (39 ft 11 1/2 in). In 2023, she won her second national title and set a new world record of 12.63 m (41 ft 5 in).

With her nationals win, Malkamaki was named to the team to compete at the 2023 World Para Athletics Championships, where she made her international debut for the United States. During the 2023 World Para Championships she won a gold medal in the shot put F46 event with a world record throw of 13.32 m (43 ft 8 1/4 in). She again represented the United States at the 2024 World Para Athletics Championships and won a gold medal in the shot put F46 event with a throw of 13.12 m (43 ft 1/2 in).

In July 2024, during the U.S. Paralympic Trials, she set a new world record throw of 13.60 m (44 ft 7 1/4 in), and qualified to represent the United States at the 2024 Summer Paralympics. At the 2024 Summer Paralympics in Paris, she won a gold medal in the shot put F46 event with a world record throw of 14.06 m (46 ft 1 1/2 in).

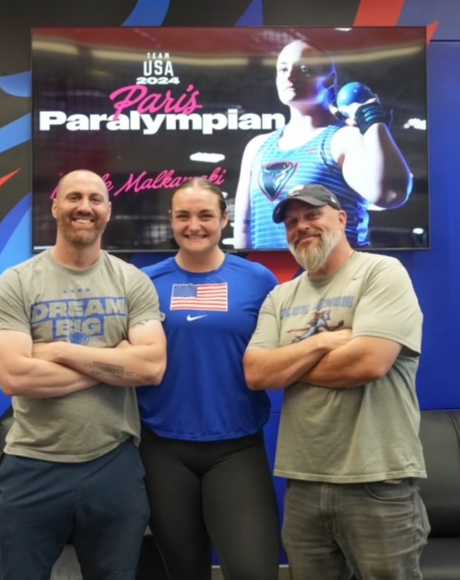
Malkamaki in 2024

== Personal life ==
Malkamaki married her high school sweetheart Robert Malkamaki in July 2020.
