= Raja Jebali =

Tunisian Paralympic athlete (born 1997)

Personal information
- Nationality: Tunisian
- Born: 2 August 1997 (age 28) Hammamet, Tunisia

Sport
- Sport: Para-athletics
- Disability class: F40
- Event: shot put
Medal record
Women's para-athletics
Representing Tunisia
Paralympic Games
Bronze medal – third place	2024 Paris	Shot put F40
World Championships
Gold medal – first place	2019 Dubai	Shot put F40
Bronze medal – third place	2017 London	Shot put F40
Bronze medal – third place	2023 Paris	Shot put F40
Bronze medal – third place	2025 New Delhi	Shot put F40

Raja Jebali (born 2 August 1997) is a Tunisian para-athlete specializing in shot put.

== Career ==
Jebali represented Tunisia at the 2024 Summer Paralympics and won a bronze medal in the shot put F40 event.
