= Miriam Martínez Rico =

Spanish Paralympic athlete

Personal information
- Born: 19 September 1990 (age 35) Ibi, Spain

Sport
- Country: Spain
- Sport: Para-athletics
- Disability class: F36
Medal record
Women's para-athletics
Representing Spain
Paralympic Games
Silver medal – second place	2020 Tokyo	Shot put F36
European Championships
Gold medal – first place	2021 Bydgoszcz	Shot put F36

Miriam Martínez Rico (born 19 September 1990) is a Spanish Paralympic athlete. She won the silver medal in the women's shot put F36 event at the 2020 Summer Paralympics held in Tokyo, Japan.
