= Antonella Ruiz Díaz =

Argentine Paralympic athlete

Personal information
- Full name: Agustina Antonella Ruiz Diaz
- Born: 28 December 1996 (age 29) Gualeguaychú, Entre Ríos, Argentina

Sport
- Sport: Paralympic athletics
- Disability class: F41
- Event: Shot put
- Club: Asociacion ParaAtletika
- Coached by: Javier Alvarez; Maria Marta Giacopuzzi
Medal record
Paralympic athletics
Representing Argentina
Paralympic Games
Bronze medal – third place	2020 Tokyo	Shot put F41
Bronze medal – third place	2024 Paris	Shot put F41
World Championships
Silver medal – second place	2019 Dubai	Shot put F41
Parapan American Games
Gold medal – first place	2019 Lima	Discus throw F41
Silver medal – second place	2019 Lima	Shot put F40/41

Antonella Ruiz Díaz (born 28 December 1996), also known as Agustina Antonella Ruiz, is an Argentine Paralympic athlete specializing in shot put. She represented Argentina at the 2019 Parapan American Games and the 2020 Summer Paralympics.

== Career ==
Díaz represented Argentina in the shot put F41 event at the 2020 Summer Paralympics and won a bronze medal.
