= Evgeniia Galaktionova =

Russian Paralympic athlete (born 2000)

Personal information
- Born: 12 April 2000 (age 26) Pyatigorsk, Russia

Sport
- Country: Russia
- Sport: Para-athletics
- Disability class: F32
- Events: Club throw; Shot put
Medal record
Women's para-athletics
Representing Neutral Paralympic Athletes
Paralympic Games
Bronze medal – third place	2024 Paris	Shot put F32
World Championships
Silver medal – second place	2024 Kobe	Shot put F32
Representing RPC
Paralympic Games
Bronze medal – third place	2020 Tokyo	Shot put F32
Representing Russia
World Championships
Silver medal – second place	2019 Dubai	Shot put F32
European Championships
Gold medal – first place	2021 Bydgoszcz	Shot put F32

Evgeniia Galaktionova (born 12 April 2000) is a Russian Paralympic athlete.

== Career ==
She won the bronze medal in the women's shot put F32 event at the 2020 Summer Paralympics held in Tokyo, Japan. She competed at the Summer Paralympics under the flag of the Russian Paralympic Committee.

In 2024, she competed in the women's club throw F32 event at the Summer Paralympics in Paris, France.
