= Safiya Burkhanova =

Uzbekistani Paralympic shot putter

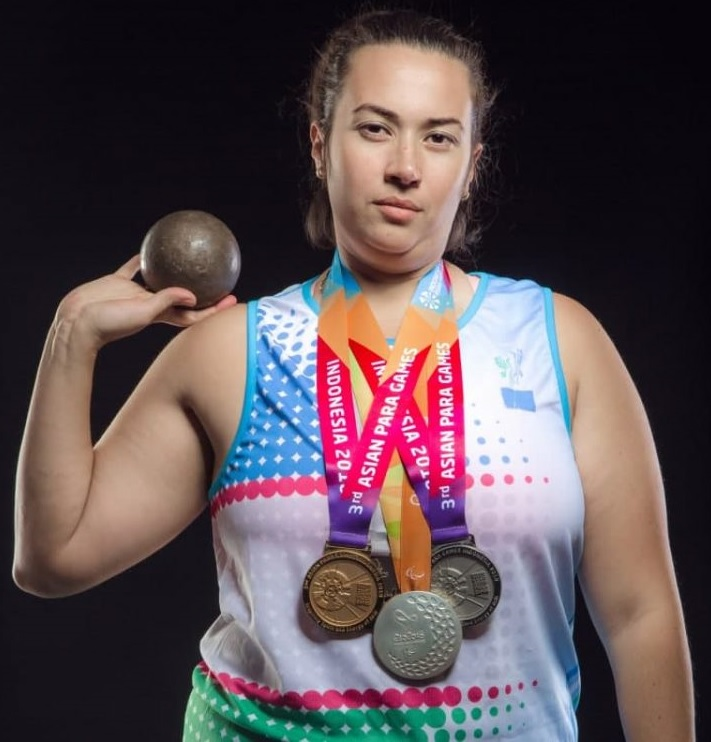

Personal information
- Born: 1 December 1989 (age 36)

Sport
- Country: Uzbekistan
- Sport: Para athletics
- Disability class: F12
- Event: Shot put
Medal record
Representing Uzbekistan
Women's para athletics
Paralympic Games
Gold medal – first place	2020 Tokyo	Shot put F12
Silver medal – second place	2016 Rio de Janeiro	Shot put F12
Silver medal – second place	2024 Paris	Shot put F12
World Championships
Gold medal – first place	2024 Kobe	Shot put F12
Silver medal – second place	2023 Paris	Shot put F12
Asian Para Games
Gold medal – first place	2018 Jakarta	Shot put F11/12
Gold medal – first place	2022 Hangzhou	Shot put F11/12
Women's athletics
Asian Indoor Championships
Gold medal – first place	2014 Hangzhou	Shot put

Sofiya Burkhanova (born 1 December 1989) is an Uzbekistani shot putter. She is a two-time medalist, including gold, in the women's shot put F12 event at the Summer Paralympics.

== Career ==
She came third at the 2008 Asian Junior Athletics Championships. She threw over seventeen metres for the first time in 2009, winning the Uzbek national title in the process. This performance gained her selection for the 2010 Asian Games, where she finished seventh in the final. The following year she placed fourth at the 2011 Asian Athletics Championships. She went unbeaten on the Asian Grand Prix in 2012, with three straight victories. She threw a personal best of 17.44 m (57 ft 2 1/2 in) in Almaty that year.

Burkhanova came close to the medals again at the 2013 Asian Athletics Championships, this time placing fifth in the shot put. She won her first continental title at the 2014 Asian Indoor Athletics Championships, where her throw of 16.80 m (55 ft 1 1/4 in) sufficed for the victory.
