= Nourhein Belhaj Salem =

Tunisian Paralympic athlete

Personal information
- Born: 6 July 2003 (age 23)

Sport
- Country: Tunisia
- Sport: Para-athletics
- Disability class: F40
- Event: Shot put
Medal record
Women's para-athletics
Representing Tunisia
Paralympic Games
Silver medal – second place	2020 Tokyo	Shot put F40

Nourhein Belhaj Salem (born 6 July 2003) is a Tunisian Paralympic athlete. She won the silver medal in the women's shot put F40 event at the 2020 Summer Paralympics held in Tokyo, Japan.
