= Rebeca Valenzuela Álvarez =

Mexican Paralympic athlete (born 1992)

Personal information
- Born: 1 September 1992 (age 33) Hermosillo, Sonora, Mexico

Sport
- Country: Mexico
- Sport: Para-athletics
- Disability: Glaucoma
- Events: Javelin throw; Shot put
Medal record
Paralympic Games
Bronze medal – third place	2016 Rio de Janeiro	Shot put F12
Bronze medal – third place	2020 Tokyo	Shot put F12
World Championships
Bronze medal – third place	2015 Doha	Shot put F12
Bronze medal – third place	2017 London	Shot put F12
Bronze medal – third place	2019 Dubai	Shot put F12
Parapan American Games
Gold medal – first place	2015 Toronto	Javelin throw F11/12
Gold medal – first place	2015 Toronto	Shot put F11/12
Gold medal – first place	2019 Lima	Javelin throw F11/12/13
Gold medal – first place	2019 Lima	Shot put F12

Rebeca Valenzuela Álvarez (born 1 September 1992) is a visually impaired Mexican Paralympic athlete. She represented Mexico at the Summer Paralympics in 2012, 2016 and 2021 and she won the bronze medal in the women's shot put F12 event in 2016. She also won the bronze medal in the same event at the 2020 Summer Paralympics.

In 2019, she qualified to represent Mexico at the 2020 Summer Paralympics in Tokyo, Japan after winning the bronze medal in the women's shot put F12 event at the 2019 World Para Athletics Championships held in Dubai, United Arab Emirates. She also competed in the women's javelin throw F13 event where she finished in 6th place.
