= Galina Lipatnikova =

Russian Paralympic athlete

Personal information
- Nationality: Russian
- Born: 25 April 1984 (age 42) Perm, Russia

Sport
- Sport: Para-athletics; Darts; Paralympic swimming
- Disability: Cerebral palsy
- Disability class: F36 (athletics)
- Event: Shot put (athletics)
- Club: Perm Regional Adaptive Sports School of Paralympic Reserve
- Coached by: Sergey Lodochnikov (athletics)
Medal record
Women's para-athletics
Representing RPC
Paralympic Games
Gold medal – first place	2020 Tokyo	shot put F36
Representing Neutral Paralympic Athletes (NPA)
World Championships
Bronze medal – third place	2025 New Delhi	Shot put F34
Representing Russia
World Championships
Silver medal – second place	2019 Dubai	Shot put F36
European Championships
Silver medal – second place	2016 Grosseto	Shot put F36

Galina Sergeyevna Lipatnikova (Russian: Галина Сергеевна Липатникова; born 25 April 1984) is a Russian para-athlete, darts player and para-swimmer (regional class). In athletics, she specializes in shot put, and is a Paralympic champion and runner-up in both the World Championships and the European Championships.

== Career ==
Lipatnikova represented Russian Paralympic Committee athletes at the 2020 Summer Paralympics in the shot put F36 event and won a gold medal.

== Awards ==
Lipatnikova is a Master of Sports in athletics and darts. She is also a Master of Sport of International Class.
