= Maria Strong (athlete) =

Australian Paralympic athlete

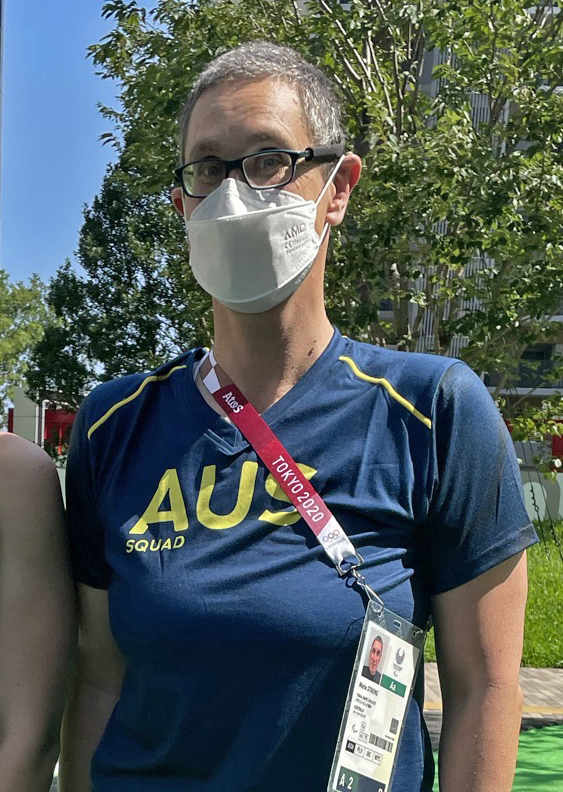

Personal information
- Nickname: Maz
- Nationality: Australian
- Born: 11 March 1971 (age 55)

Sport
- Country: Australia
- Sport: Paralympic athletics
- Club: Athletics Essendon
- Coached by: John Eden
Medal record
Para-athletics
Representing Australia
Paralympic Games
Bronze medal – third place	2020 Tokyo	Women's shot put F33
World Para Athletics Championships
Gold medal – first place	2023 Paris	Women’s 100m T72
Silver medal – second place	2023 Paris	Women’s Shot Put F33

Maria Strong (born 11 March 1971) is an Australian Paralympic athlete. They won a bronze medal in Women's shot put F33 at the 2020 Summer Paralympics and a gold medal in the Women’s 100m T72 frame running and a silver medal in the Women's Shot Put F33 events at the 2023 World Para Athletics Championships.

They have been selected for the 2024 Paris Paralympics in Women's Shot put F33, where they finished 8th.

Strong is nonbinary and uses they/them pronouns.
