= Mayerli Buitrago Ariza =

Colombian Paralympic athlete (born 1986)

Personal information
- Nationality: Colombian
- Born: 4 November 1986 (age 39) Bucaramanga, Colombia

Sport
- Sport: Para-athletics
- Disability class: F41
- Events: Discus throw; Shot put
- Club: Santander
- Coached by: Anderson Calderon
Medal record
Representing Colombia
Women's para-athletics
Event	1st	2nd	3rd
Paralympic Games	0	1	0
World Championships	1	0	2
Parapan American Games	1	1	1
Total	2	2	3
Paralympic Games
Silver medal – second place	2020 Tokyo	Shot put F41
World Championships
Gold medal – first place	2025 New Delhi	Shot put F41
Bronze medal – third place	2023 Paris	Shot put F41
Bronze medal – third place	2024 Kobe	Shot put F41
Parapan American Games
Gold medal – first place	2019 Lima	Shot put F40/41
Silver medal – second place	2023 Santiago	Shot put F40/41
Bronze medal – third place	2019 Lima	Discus throw F41

Mayerli Buitrago Ariza (born 4 November 1986) is a Colombian Paralympic athlete specializing in shot put. She represented Colombia at the 2020 and 2024 Summer Paralympics.

== Career ==
Ariza represented Colombia in the shot put F41 event at the 2020 Summer Paralympics and won a silver medal.
