= Fouzia El Kassioui =

Moroccan Paralympic athlete (born 1992)

Personal information
- Born: 1 January 1992 (age 34) Benslimane, Morocco

Sport
- Country: Morocco
- Sport: Para-athletics
- Disability class: F33
- Event: Shot put
Medal record
Women's para-athletics
Representing Morocco
Paralympic Games
Silver medal – second place	2020 Tokyo	Shot put F33
World Championships
Bronze medal – third place	2019 Dubai	Shot put F33
Bronze medal – third place	2024 Kobe	Javelin throw F34

Fouzia El Kassioui (born 1 January 1992) is a Moroccan Paralympic athlete.

== Biography ==
At the age of 10, she was diagnosed with Parkinson's disease and cerebral palsy. In 2017, she joined the Benslimane Al-Ahd Al-Jadid Association and began training in shot put.

At the 2019 World Para Athletics Championships held in Dubai, United Arab Emirates, she won the bronze medal in the women's shot put F33 event.

She won the silver medal in the women's shot put F33 event at the 2020 Summer Paralympics held in Tokyo, Japan. She also competed in the women's javelin throw F34 event.
