= Lauritta Onye =

Nigerian Paralympic athlete

Personal information
- Nationality: Nigerian
- Born: 4 January 1984 (age 42) Owerri, Nigeria
- Height: 125 cm (4 ft 1 in)

Sport
- Country: Nigeria
- Sport: Athletics (track)
- Disability: short stature
- Disability class: F40
- Coached by: Patrick Anaeto
Medal record
Women's para athletics
Representing Nigeria
Paralympic Games
Gold medal – first place	2016 Rio de Janeiro	Shot put F40
Bronze medal – third place	2020 Tokyo	Shot put F40
World Championships
Gold medal – first place	2015 Doha	Shot put F40
Silver medal – second place	2023 Paris	Shot put F40

Lauritta Onye // (born 4 January 1984) is a Paralympian athlete who competes in F40 classification throwing events. She competed at the 2016 Summer Paralympics in Rio de Janeiro winning gold in the F40 shot put. Onye is also an actress, performing under the name Laury White.

== Personal history ==
Onye was born in Owerri, Nigeria in 1984. She is from Ikeduru. Onye was born with a form of achondroplasia and is 1.25 metres (4.1 ft) in height. Besides athletics, Onye had ambitions to be an actress and in 2015 she starred in the Nollywood film Lords of Money, appearing under the name Laury White.

== Athletics career ==
Onye took up athletics in 2008, but she did not make an impact on the international scene until a change in the laws of athletics Para-athletics classification in 2012. Prior to 2012, athletes of short stature were classified under the F40 rule, which included any female competitor under 140 cm. In attempt to balance the field the 2012 ruling split F40 classification into F40 and F41, with F40 now being for female athletes of 125 cm and under, placing Onye as one of the tallest athletes in her class.

One of the first major international evens to hold a throwing event for F40 classification athletes was the 2015 IPC Athletics World Championships held in Doha. Onye entered the only event held for F40 athletes, the shot put. Onye went into the World Championships as one of the favourites, having set a world record distance of 7.59 metres in Tunisia in March early in the year. In Doha Onye improved on her own record by throwing a distance of 7.72 on her first attempt. Her nearest rival, Lara Baars of the Netherlands, threw a best of 6.80, in itself a European record, but almost a metre short of Onye. It was the Nigerian team's only medal of the Championships.

On returning to Nigeria, the country's top Olympic and Paralympic athletes were received by President Buhari and awarded funding to aid in the athletes' training for the 2016 Games in Rio de Janeiro. Despite Onye claiming the funding was forthcoming, neither she, not her coach received the money leading to a negative impact on Onye's preparations for Rio. She believed that it was due to her being a disabled athlete that the money was not allocated to her. In response she threatened to pull out of the Games.

Despite the financial hardships Onye did represent Nigeria at the 2016 Summer Paralympics, entering the shot put (T40). Onye dominated her field, beating Tunisia's Rima Abdelli into silver place. On becoming the first T40 athlete to throw over eight metres, Onye reacted excitedly by cartwheeling and dancing in front of the Brazilian crowd.

Achievements:

- 2011: All Africa Games-Maputo Shot Put-Silver medalist
- 2015: African Championships-Tunisia Shot Put-Gold and Discus-Silver medalist
- 2015 IPC Athletics World Championships ( Now World Para Athletics Championships)-Doha, Shot put Gold medalist.
- 2016:Paralympics- Rio Shot Put Gold and New World Record of 8.4m
