= Asmahan Boudjadar =

Algerian Paralympic athlete

Personal information
- National team: Algeria
- Born: 30 June 1980 (age 46) Constantine, Algeria

Sport
- Country: Algeria
- Sport: Para-athletics
- Disability class: F33
- Events: Javelin throw Shot put
Medal record
Representing Algeria
Women's para athletics
Paralympic Games
Gold medal – first place	2016 Rio de Janeiro	Shot put F33
Gold medal – first place	2020 Tokyo	Shot put F33
World Championships
Gold medal – first place	2023 Paris	Shot put F33

Asmahan Boudjadar is an Algerian athlete competing in the shot put and javelin. She won the gold medal in the F33 shot put at the 2016 Summer Paralympics held in Rio de Janeiro, Brazil.

== Career ==
Asmahan Boudjadar competed in the shot put at the 2015 IPC Athletics World Championships in Doha, Qatar. She threw a no mark in the final, ending in last place. In March 2016, she broke the African F33 shot put record with a throw of 5.56 metres (18.2 ft) at the IPC Athletes Grand Prix in Dubai. Boudjadar also threw in the javelin, where she set a new F33 world record.

She competed in her first Summer Paralympics in 2016 in Rio de Janeiro, Brazil, later that year. Taking part in the women's F33 shot put, she won the gold medal with a new African record of 5.72 metres (18.8 ft), ahead of Qatar's Sara Hamdi Masoud and Sara Alesanaani of the United Arab Emirates in second and third place respectively. Boudjadar spoke after the event, saying that she felt it was her revenge after the results at the previous World Championships. In the first Grand Prix event of 2017, she broke the javelin world record once again, with a throw of 12.82 metres (42.1 ft).
