= Vanessa Wallace =

British Paralympic athlete (born 1977)

Personal information
- Nickname: Nessa
- Born: 20 June 1977 (age 49) London, England

Sport
- Country: United Kingdom
- Sport: Paralympic athletics
- Disability: Ehlers Danlos syndrome, dystonia
- Disability class: F34
- Event(s): Shot put Javelin throw
- Club: Enfield and Haringey Athletic Club
- Coached by: Alison O'Riordan
Medal record
Paralympic athletics
Representing United Kingdom
World Championships
Bronze medal – third place	2019 Dubai	Women's shot put F34
European Championships
Gold medal – first place	2018 Berlin	Women's shot put F34

Vanessa Wallace (born 20 June 1977) is a British Paralympic athlete who competes in shot put and javelin events in international level events.
