= Kubaro Khakimova =

Uzbekistani Paralympic athlete (born 2002)

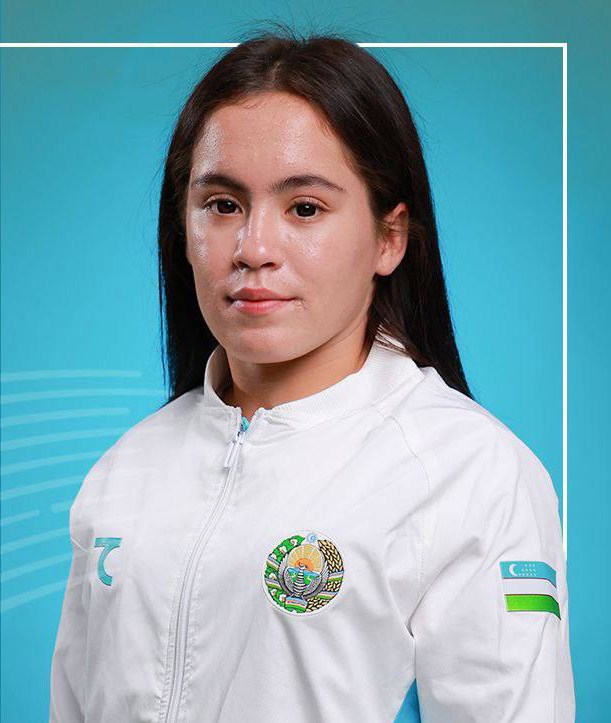

Personal information
- Nationality: Uzbekistani
- Born: 31 January 2002 (age 24) Samarkand, Uzbekistan

Sport
- Sport: Para-athletics
- Disability class: F41
- Event(s): shot put discus throw
Medal record
Para-athletics
Representing Uzbekistan
Paralympic Games
Silver medal – second place	2024 Paris	Shot put F41
World Championships
Silver medal – second place	2023 Paris	Shot put F41
Silver medal – second place	2024 Kobe	Shot put F41
Silver medal – second place	2025 New Delhi	Shot put F41
Asian Para Games
Gold medal – first place	2022 Hangzhou	Shot put F41

Kubaro Khakimova (born 31 January 2002) is an Uzbekistani para-athlete, competing in throwing events: shot put and discus throw. She represented Uzbekistan at the 2024 Summer Paralympics.

== Career ==
Khakimova represented Uzbekistan at the 2023 World Para Athletics Championships and won a silver medal in the shot put F41 event. She again represented Uzbekistan at the 2024 World Para Athletics Championships and won a silver medal in the shot put F41 event.

She represented Uzbekistan at the 2024 Summer Paralympics and won a silver medal in the shot put F41 event.
