= Gloria Zarza Guadarrama =

Mexican Paralympic athlete (born 1984)

Gloria Zarza
Personal information
- Full name: Gloria Zarza Guadarrama
- Born: 20 August 1984 (age 41) Zinacantepec, Mexico

Sport
- Sport: Paralympic athletics
- Disability class: F54
- Event: shot put
Medal record
Women's para-athletics
Representing Mexico
Paralympic Games
Gold medal – first place	2024 Paris	Shot put F54
Silver medal – second place	2020 Tokyo	Shot put F54
World Championships
Gold medal – first place	2024 Kobe	Shot put F54
Gold medal – first place	2025 New Delhi	Shot put F54
Parapan American Games
Bronze medal – third place	2019 Lima	Shot put F53/54/55

Gloria Zarza Guadarrama (born 20 August 1984) is a Mexican Paralympic athlete specializing in shot put. She represented Mexico in the Paralympic Games.

== Career ==
Zarza made her international debut for Mexico at the 2016 Summer Paralympics where she finished in fourth place in the women's shot put F54 event.

Zarza again represented Mexico at the 2020 Summer Paralympics in the women's shot put F54 event and won a silver medal.
