= Safia Djelal =

Algerian Paralympic athlete (born 1983)

Personal information
- Nationality: Algerian
- Born: 4 March 1983 (age 43) Batna, Algeria

Sport
- Country: Algeria
- Sport: Athletics (track)
- Disability class: T58
Medal record
Women's para athletics
Representing Algeria
Paralympic Games
Gold medal – first place	2004 Athens	Javelin throw F56-58
Gold medal – first place	2020 Tokyo	Shot put F57
Gold medal – first place	2024 Paris	Shot put F57
Silver medal – second place	2012 London	Javelin throw F56-58
World Championships
Gold medal – first place	2024 Kobe	Shot put F57
Gold medal – first place	2025 New Delhi	Shot put F57

Sofia Djelal (Arabic: صفية جلال, born 4 March 1983) is a Paralympian athlete from Algeria competing mainly in category F56-58 javelin throw events.

== Career ==
=== Paralympic Games ===
She competed in the 2004 Summer Paralympics in Athens, Greece. There she won a gold medal in the women's F56-F58 javelin throw event. She also competed in the F56-F58 shot put and discus events.

=== IPC Athletics World Championships ===
At the 2006 IPC Athletics World Championships in Assen, Netherlands, Djelal won gold in the women's javelin F57/58 event, as well as silver in the shot put F58 event.

In 2015, Djelal was awarded a bronze medal in the F57 discus event at the IPC Athletics World Championships in Doha. In 2023, she broke her own world record of F57 weight throw (in a wheelchair) at the World Para Athletics Championships in Paris, with a throw of 11.57 metres.
