= Nicole Harris =

Australian Paralympic athlete (born 1992)

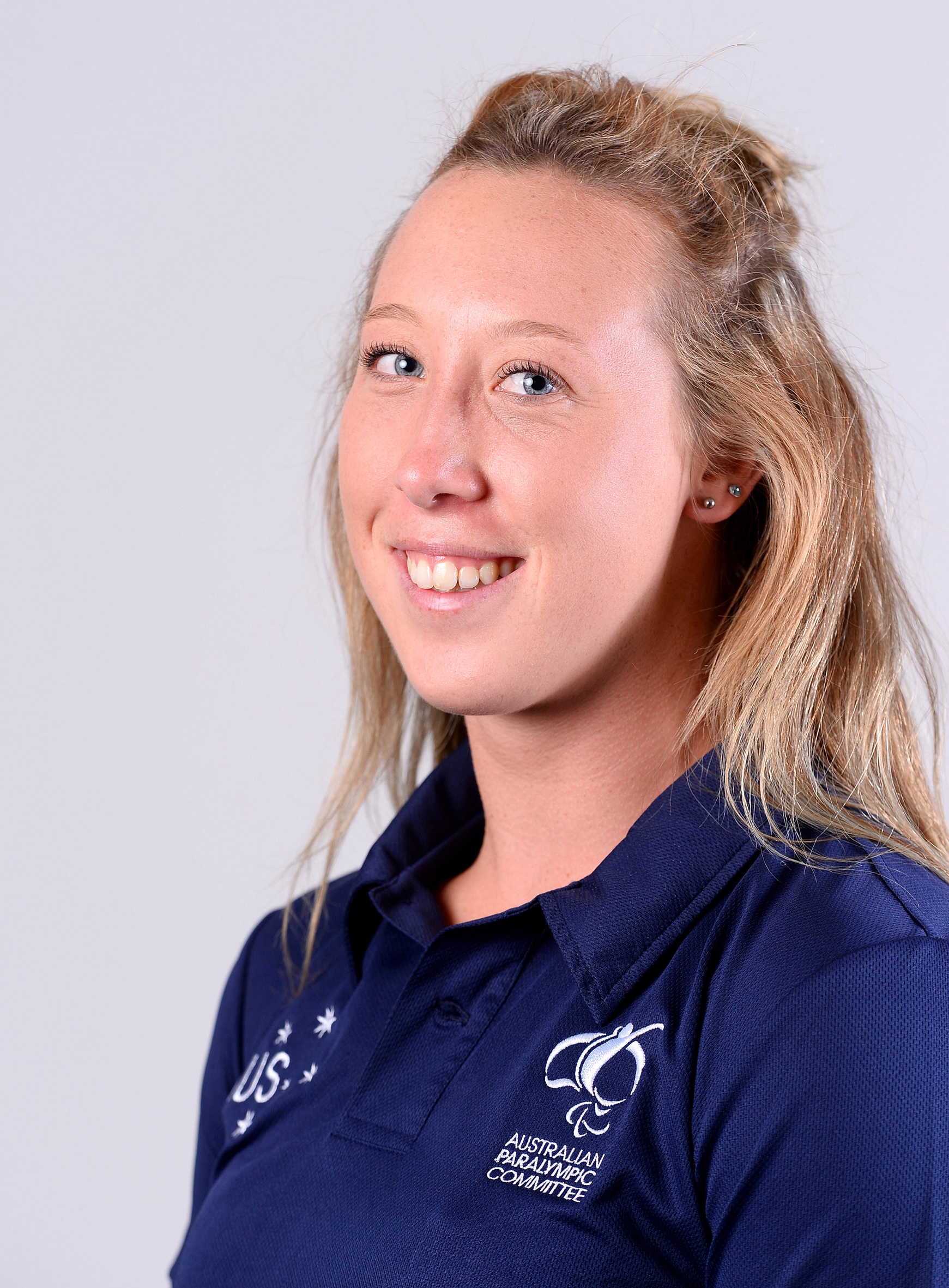
- 2016 Australian team portrait

Personal information
- Nickname: Coley
- Born: 16 July 1992 (age 33) Hurstville, New South Wales
- Height: 183 cm (6 ft 0 in)
- Weight: 79 kg (174 lb)

Sport
- Country: Australia
- Sport: Track and field (F20)
- Club: St George District Athletics Club

Nicole Harris (born 16 July 1992) is an Australian Paralympic athlete with intellectual disability and mild cerebral palsy. She represented Australia at the 2016 Rio Paralympics in athletics.

== Personal ==
Harris was born on 16 July 1992 in Hurstville, New South Wales with an intellectual impairment and cerebral palsy. She attended Danebank Anglican School for Girls. In 2016, she works at Danebank School and Caringbah YMCA.

== Athletics ==
Harris was initially a 1500m runner but changed to throwing events after a coach suggested that she might be successful due to her long limbs. She is classified as a F20 athlete. At the 2013 IPC Athletics World Championships, she finished 6th in the Women's Shot Put F20. At the 2015 IPC Athletics World Championships, she finished 7th in the Women's Shot Put F20.

At the 2016 Rio Paralympics Harris competed in the F20 Shot put event ranking 7th overall.
