= Xu Mian (athlete) =

Chinese Paralympic athlete (born 1997)

Personal information
- Nationality: Chinese
- Born: 10 September 1997 (age 28) Huai'an, China

Sport
- Sport: Paralympic athletics
- Disability class: F57
- Event(s): shot put discus throw
- Coached by: Xu Chongyao
Medal record
Women's para-athletics
Representing China
Paralympic Games
Silver medal – second place	2020 Tokyo	Shot put F57
Silver medal – second place	2024 Paris	Discus throw F57
Silver medal – second place	2024 Paris	Shot put F57
World Championships
Silver medal – second place	2019 Dubai	Discus throw F57
Silver medal – second place	2024 Kobe	Shot put F57
Asian Para Games
Gold medal – first place	2022 Hangzhou	Shot put F57
Bronze medal – third place	2022 Hangzhou	Discus throw F56/57

Xu Mian (born 10 September 1997) is a Chinese Paralympic athlete specializing in throwing events. She represented China at the 2020 Summer Paralympics.

== Career ==
Mian represented China in the shot put F57 event at the 2020 Summer Paralympics and won a silver medal.
