= Aleksandra Zaitseva =

Russian para athlete (born 1999)

Personal information
- Nationality: Russian
- Born: 15 January 1999 (age 27)

Sport
- Sport: Para-athletics
- Disability class: F20
- Event: shot put
Medal record
Women's para-athletics
Representing Neutral Paralympic Athletes
World Championships
Bronze medal – third place	2024 Kobe	Shot put F20
Bronze medal – third place	2025 New Delhi	Shot put F20
European Championships
Gold medal – first place	2021 Bydgoszcz	Shot put F20

Aleksandra Zaitseva (born 15 January 1999) is a Russian para athlete specializing in shot put. She competed at the 2020 and 2024 Summer Paralympics.

== Career ==
Aleksandra represented Russian Paralympic Committee athletes at the 2020 Summer Paralympics and finished in tenth place in the shot put F20 event. She represented Neutral Paralympic Athletes at the 2024 Summer Paralympics and finished in eighth place in the shot put F20 event.

She competed at the 2024 World Para Athletics Championships and won a bronze medal in the shot put F20 event. She again competed at the 2025 World Para Athletics Championships and won a bronze medal in the shot put F20 event.
