= Gloria Agblemagnon =

French Paralympic athlete

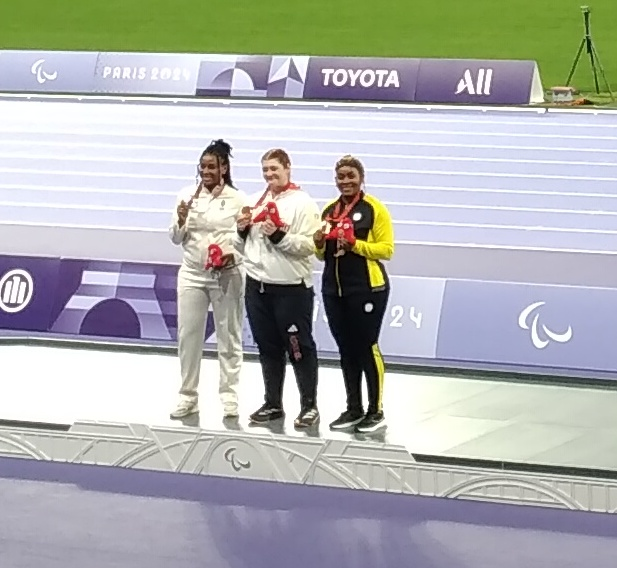
- Gloria Agblemagnon, Sabrina Fortune, and Poleth Isamar Méndes Sánchez at the F20 shot put medal ceremony at the Paris 2024 Paralympic Games

Personal information
- Born: 9 December 1997 (age 28) Vierzon, France

Sport
- Country: France
- Sport: Paralympic athletics
- Disability: Intellectual impairment
- Disability class: F20
- Event: Shot put
- Club: Saran Loiret Athletics Club
Medal record
Women's para athletics
Representing France
Paralympic Games
Silver medal – second place	2024 Paris	Shot put F20
World Championships
Bronze medal – third place	2019 Dubai	Shot put F20
INAS Global Games
Gold medal – first place	2015 Quito	Shot put F20
Gold medal – first place	2019 Brisbane	Shot put F20

Gloria Agblemagnon (born 9 December 1997) is a French Paralympic athlete who competes in shot put in international level events.
