= Marivana Oliveira =

Brazilian Paralympic athlete (born 1990)

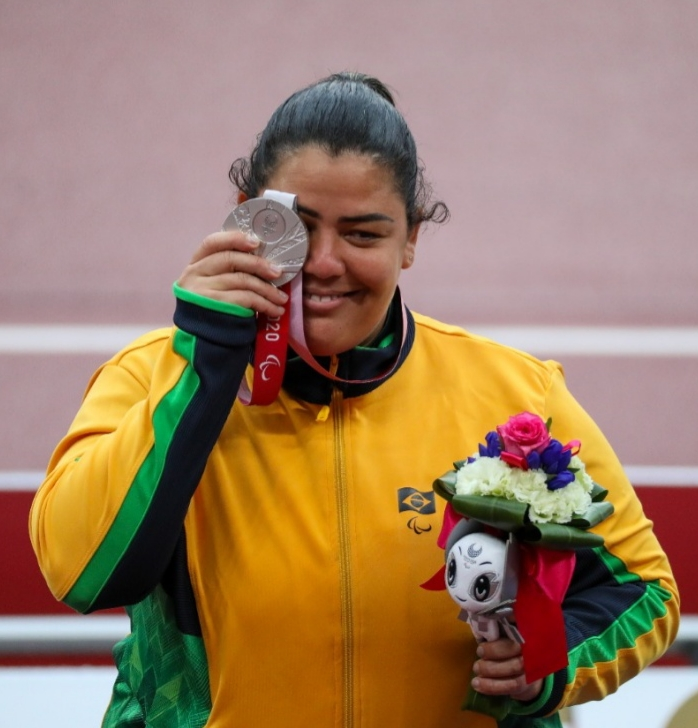
- Oliveira in 2021

Personal information
- Full name: Marivana Oliveira da Nóbrega
- Born: 2 May 1990 (age 36) Maceió, Alagoas, Brazil

Sport
- Country: Brazil
- Sport: Para-athletics
- Disability: Cerebral palsy
- Disability class: F35
- Events: Discus throw; Shot put
Medal record
Paralympic Games
Silver medal – second place	2020 Tokyo	Shot put F35
Bronze medal – third place	2016 Rio de Janeiro	Shot put F35
World Championships
Bronze medal – third place	2015 Doha	Shot put F35
Bronze medal – third place	2019 Lima	Shot put F35
Parapan American Games
Gold medal – first place	2011 Guadalajara	Discus throw F35/36/37
Gold medal – first place	2015 Toronto	Shot put F35/36
Silver medal – second place	2011 Guadalajara	Shot put F35/36/37
Bronze medal – third place	2019 Lima	Shot put F35/36/37

Marivana Oliveira da Nóbrega (born 2 May 1990) is a Brazilian Paralympic athlete with cerebral palsy. She won the silver medal in the women's shot put F35 event at the 2020 Summer Paralympics held in Tokyo, Japan. She also represented Brazil at the 2012 Summer Paralympics held in London, United Kingdom and at the 2016 Summer Paralympics held in Rio de Janeiro, Brazil. She won the bronze medal in the women's shot put F35 event in 2016.

She won the bronze medal in the women's shot put F35 event at the World Para Athletics Championships both in 2015 and in 2019.
