= Juliane Mogge =

German Paralympic athlete

Personal information
- Born: 5 March 1990 (age 36) Kassel, Germany
- Height: 1.73 m (5 ft 8 in)

Sport
- Country: Germany
- Sport: Paralympic athletics
- Disability: Cerebral palsy
- Disability class: T36
- Event: Shot put
- Club: LC Adler Bottrop
- Coached by: Marion Peters
Medal record
Paralympic athletics
Representing Germany
World Championships
Silver medal – second place	2017 London	Shot put F36
European Championships
Bronze medal – third place	2016 Grosseto	Shot put F35/36
Bronze medal – third place	2018 Berlin	Shot put F36-37

Juliane Mogge (born 5 March 1990) is a German Paralympic athlete who competes at international track and field competitions in the shot put. She is a World silver medalist and a two-time European bronze medalist.
