= Fadhila Nafati =

Tunisian Paralympic athlete

Sport
- Country: Tunisia
- Sport: Para-athletics
- Disability class: F54
- Events: Javelin throw; Shot put
Medal record
Paralympic Games
| Bronze medal – third place | 2016 Rio de Janeiro | Shot put F54 |
Pan Arab Games
| Gold medal – first place | 2011 Doha | Shot put F54/55/56 |
| Silver medal – second place | 2011 Doha | Javelin throw F54/55/56 |

Fadhila Nafati is a Tunisian Paralympic athlete. She represented Tunisia at the Summer Paralympics in 2012, 2016 and 2021. She won the bronze medal in the women's shot put F54 event in 2016.

== Achievements ==
| Year | Competition | Venue | Position | Event | Notes |
Representing Tunisia
| 2016 | Summer Paralympics | Rio de Janeiro, Brazil | 3rd | Shot put | 6.38 m |
