= Francisca Mardones =

Francisca Mardones may refer to:

- Francisca Mardones (parathlete), Chilean Paralympic athlete and wheelchair tennis player
- Francisca Mardones (footballer), Chilean footballer
