= Ana Gradečak =

Croatian Paralympic athlete

Personal information
- Born: 24 May 1990 (age 36) Novska, Yugoslavia

Sport
- Sport: Paralympic athletics
- Disability class: F41
- Event: Shot put
Medal record
Representing Croatia
European Championships
| Gold medal – first place | 2021 Bydgoszcz | Shot put F41 |

Ana Gradečak (born 24 May 1990) is a Croatian Paralympic athlete who specializes in international track and field events. She is a European champion in shot put and participated in the 2020 Summer Paralympics.
