= Anna Nicholson =

British Paralympic athlete (born 1995)

Personal information
- Nationality: British
- Born: 13 April 1995 (age 31)
- Home town: Brampton, Carlisle, U.K.

Sport
- Sport: Para-athletics
- Disability class: F35
- Event: shot put
Medal record
Women's para-athletics
Representing Great Britain
Paralympic Games
| Bronze medal – third place | 2024 Paris | Shot put F35 |
World Championships
| Bronze medal – third place | 2025 New Delhi | Shot put F35 |

Anna Nicholson (born 13 April 1995) is a British para-athlete specializing in shot put. She represented Great Britain at the 2024 Summer Paralympics.

== Career ==
Nicholson represented Great Britain at the 2023 World Para Athletics Championships and finished in fourth place in the shot put F35 event.

She represented Great Britain at the 2024 Summer Paralympics and won a bronze medal in the shot put F35 event. She competed at the 2025 World Para Athletics Championships and won a bronze medal in the shot put F35 event.
