= Zoi Mantoudi =

Greek Paralympic athlete (born 1994)

Personal information
- Born: 21 December 1994 (age 31)

Sport
- Country: Greece
- Sport: Paralympic athletics
- Disability class: F20
- Event: Shot put
Medal record
Paralympic athletics
Representing Greece
World Championships
Bronze medal – third place	2017 London	Shot put F20
European Championships
Bronze medal – third place	2021 Bydgoszcz	Shot put F20

Zoi Mantoudi (born 21 December 1994) is a Greek Paralympic athlete who competes in shot put at international track and field competitions. She is a World and European bronze medalist. She has also competed at the 2016 and 2020 Summer Paralympics where she finished ninth and sixth place respectively.
