= Mary Fitzgerald (athlete) =

Irish Paralympic athlete

Personal information
- Born: 11 August 1999 (age 26) Kilkenny, Ireland

Sport
- Sport: Paralympic athletics
- Disability: Achondroplasia
- Disability class: F40
- Event: Shot put
- Club: Gowran Athletics Club
Medal record
Representing Ireland
European Championships
Bronze medal – third place	2021 Bydgoszcz	Shot put F40

Mary Fitzgerald (born 11 August 1999) is an Irish Paralympic athlete who competes in international track and field competitions. She is a European bronze medalist in shot put and has competed at the 2020 Summer Paralympics but did not medal.

Fitzgerald is also a pediatric occupational therapist and is an ambassador for Enable Ireland, an Irish disability services provider that supports disabled people.
