= Joanna Oleksiuk =

Personal information
- Born: 14 July 1992 (age 34) Gryfino, Poland

Sport
- Sport: Paralympic athletics
- Disability: Cerebral hypoxia
Medal record
Representing Poland
World Championships
Bronze medal – third place	2023 Paris	Shot put F33
European Championships
Gold medal – first place	2021 Bydgoszcz	Shot put F33
Silver medal – second place	2018 Berlin	Shot put F33

Joanna Oleksiuk (born 14 July 1992) is a Polish Paralympic athlete who competes in international track and field competitions. She is a World bronze medalist and European champion in shot put. She has also competed at the 2020 and 2024 Summer Paralympics.
