= María de los Ángeles Ortiz =

Mexican Paralympic athlete (born 1973)

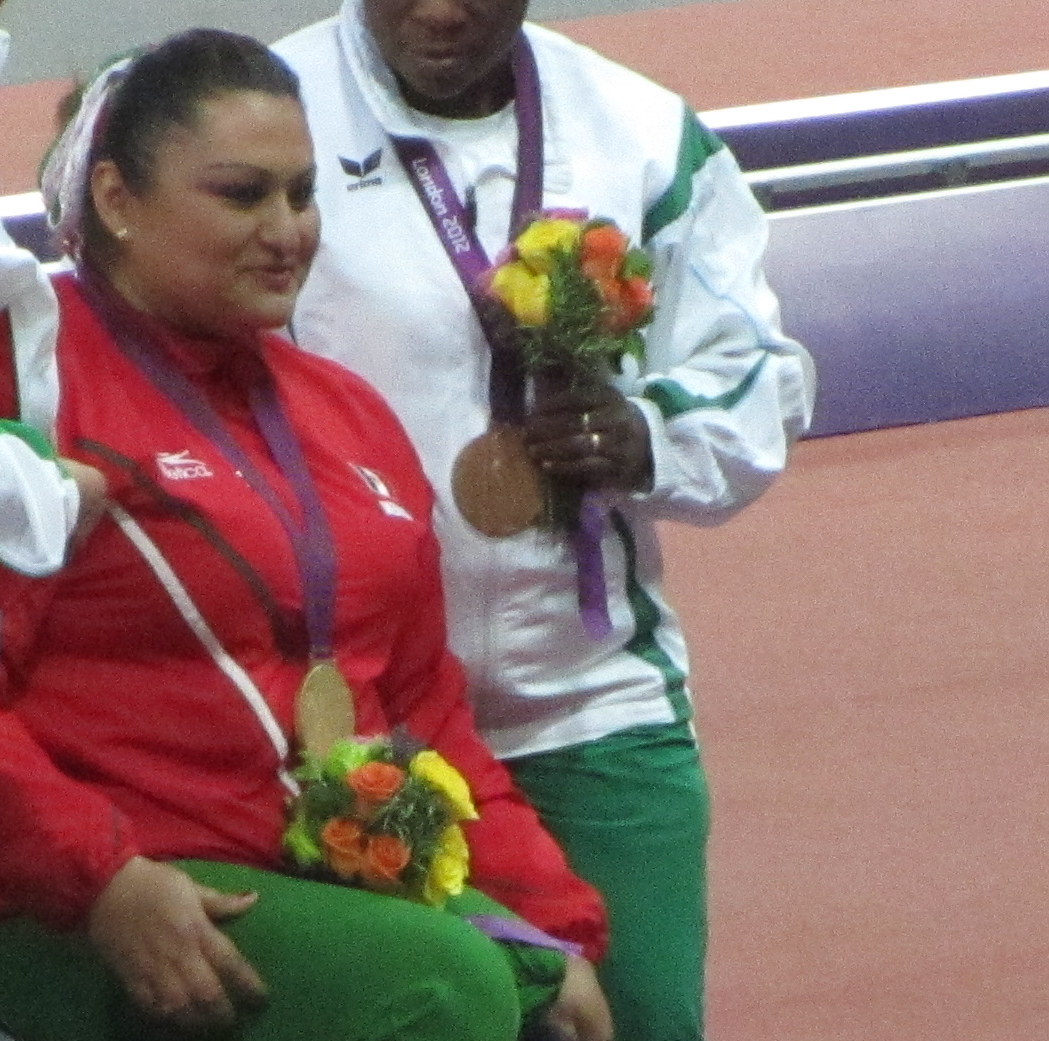
- Ortiz at London 2012 Summer Paralympics

Personal information
- Full name: María de los Ángeles Ortiz Hernández
- Born: 18 February 1973 (age 53) Comalcalco, Tabasco, Mexico
Medal record
Women's para-athletics
Representing Mexico
Paralympic Games
| Gold medal – first place | 2012 London | Shot put F57/58 |
| Gold medal – first place | 2016 Rio de Janeiro | Shot put F57/58 |
| Silver medal – second place | 2008 Beijing | Shot put F57/58 |
World Championships
| Silver medal – second place | 2024 Kobe | Discus throw F57 |
Parapan American Games
| Gold medal – first place | 2007 Rio de Janeiro | Shot put F55–58 |
| Gold medal – first place | 2011 Guadalajara | Shot put F57/58 |
| Gold medal – first place | 2015 Toronto | Shot put F56/57 |
| Gold medal – first place | 2019 Lima | Shot put F57 |
| Gold medal – first place | 2023 Santiago | Shot put F57 |

María de los Ángeles Ortiz Hernández (born 18 February 1973) is a Mexican paralympian athlete competing mainly in category F57/58 shot put events.

== Career ==
She competed in the 2008 Summer Paralympics in Beijing, China. There, she won a silver medal in the women's shot put F57/F58 event. Three years later she won the gold medal and world record in the same event at the 2011 IPC Athletics World Championships held in Christchurch, New Zealand. In 2011 won the gold medal and new world record in the Parapanamericans Games in Guadalajara, Mexico, and silver medal in discus throw.

She became double Paralympic Champion by winning gold at the 2012 Summer Paralympics in London and 2016 Summer Paralympics in Rio de Janeiro.

== Personal life ==
She is daughter of Víctor Ángel Ortiz Tenorio, a baseball player.
