= Lydia Church =

British Paralympic athlete

Personal information
- Born: 13 October 1999 (age 26) Peterborough, England

Sport
- Country: United Kingdom
- Sport: Paralympic athletics
- Disability: Visually impaired
- Disability class: F12
- Event: Shot put
- Club: Peterborough and Nene Valley Athletic Club
- Coached by: Jim Edwards
Medal record
Women's para-athletics
Representing United Kingdom
World Championships
Bronze medal – third place	2025 New Delhi	Shot put F12
European Championships
Silver medal – second place	2021 Bydgoszcz	Shot put F12

Lydia Church (born 13 October 1999) is a British Paralympic athlete who competes in shot put events in international level events. She won the silver medal at the 2021 World Para Athletics European Championships in women's shot put F12. Church was also selected to compete at the 2020 Summer Paralympics.

Church competed at the 2025 World Para Athletics Championships in New Delhi. She won the bronze medal with a throw of 12.60m.
