= Klaudia Maliszewska =

Polish Paralympic athlete (born 1992)

Personal information
- Born: 28 January 1992 (age 34) Grudziądz, Poland
- Height: 1.62 m (5 ft 4 in)

Sport
- Country: Poland
- Sport: Paralympic athletics
- Disability: Cerebral palsy
- Disability class: F35
- Event: Shot put
Medal record
Paralympic athletics
Representing Poland
World Championships
Bronze medal – third place	2017 London	Shot put F35
European Championships
Silver medal – second place	2018 Berlin	Shot put F35
Bronze medal – third place	2021 Bydgoszcz	Shot put F35

Klaudia Maliszewska (born 28 January 1992) is a Polish Paralympic athlete who competes in the shot put at international elite competitions. She is a World bronze medalist and a European silver medalist and she is selected to compete at the 2020 Summer Paralympics. She is the daughter of Polish Paralympic powerlifter Miroslaw Maliszewski.
