= Athletics at the 2012 Summer Paralympics – Women's shot put =

The Women's Shot Put athletics events for the 2012 Summer Paralympics took place at the London Olympic Stadium from September 1 to September 8, 2012. A total of 9 events were contested incorporating 16 different classifications.

== Schedule ==
Event↓/Date →	Fri 31	Sat 1	Sun 2	Mon 3	Tue 4	Wed 5	Thr 6	Fri 7	Sat 8
F11/12 Shot Put					F				
F20 Shot Put						F			
F32–34 Shot Put							F		
F35/36 Shot Put			F						
F37 Shot Put					F				
F40 Shot Put									F
F42/44 Shot Put				F					
F54–56 Shot Put		F							
F57/58 Shot Put									F

== Results ==
=== F11/12 ===
Rank	Athlete	Nationality	Class	1	2	3	4	5	6	Result	Score	Notes
1st place, gold medalist(s)	Assunta Legnante	Italy	F11	16.74	16.47	15.80	16.41	16.45	16.69	16.74	1011	WR
2nd place, silver medalist(s)	Hongxia Tang	China	F11	11.58	11.83	x	11.44	12.47	11.29	12.47	1008	RR
3rd place, bronze medalist(s)	Liangmin Zhang	China	F11	10.28	x	x	9.86	10.57	11.07	11.07	1003	SB
4	Tania Lorena Jimenez Manzanarez	Mexico	F11	9.24	8.87	8.45	8.50	8.93	8.85	9.24	981	
5	Hajar Taktaz	Iran	F11	7.75	x	8.81	8.48	8.85	8.84	8.85	970	PB
6	Tamara Sivakova	Belarus	F12	12.21	12.39	x	11.82	12.08	12.31	12.39	966	SB
7	Izabela Campos	Brazil	F11	8.53	x	8.07	8.39	8.30	8.71	8.71	966	
8	Marta Prokofyeva	Russia	F12	12.15	11.77	12.04	11.69	12.25	11.95	12.25	958	
9	Orysia Ilchyna	Ukraine	F12	11.76	11.75	11.76	–	–	–	11.76	928	SB
10	Rita Elena Osorio Cota	Mexico	F11	7.19	7.80	7.54	–	–	–	7.80	921	PB
11	Yuclesy Pinto	Venezuela	F11	7.43	7.56	7.33	–	–	–	7.56	904	
12	Ailish Dunne	Ireland	F11	6.64	6.67	6.12	–	–	–	6.67	808	
13	Natalija Eder	Austria	F12	x	9.96	9.78	–	–	–	9.96	773	
14	Rebeca Valenzuela Alvarez	Mexico	F12	9.95	9.41	x	–	–	–	9.95	772	
15	Rose Welepa	France	F12	9.89	9.80	9.62	–	–	–	9.89	766	PB
16	Hamela Devi Enikutty	Malaysia	F12	8.40	9.77	9.23	–	–	–	9.77	753	
17	Elizabeth Almada	Argentina	F12	9.46	9.47	9.72	–	–	–	9.72	747	
18	Nadine Lattimore	Ireland	F11	5.78	6.06	5.79	–	–	–	6.06	705	
–	Yesenia Maria Restrepo Munoz	Colombia	F11	x	x	x	–	–	–	NM		

=== F20 ===
Rank	Athlete	Nationality	1	2	3	4	5	6	Result	Notes
1st place, gold medalist(s)	Ewa Durska	Poland	13.08	13.40	13.51	13.80	x	12.80	13.80	PR
2nd place, silver medalist(s)	Anastasiia Mysnyk	Ukraine	12.34	12.67	12.59	12.35	12.41	12.38	12.67	PB
3rd place, bronze medalist(s)	Svitlana Kudelya	Ukraine	11.74	12.09	x	x	12.03	12.24	12.24	
4	Inês Fernandes	Portugal	11.48	11.53	11.28	11.52	11.27	11.84	11.84	
5	Sirly Tiik	Estonia	10.77	11.15	11.12	11.04	11.54	11.01	11.54	PB
6	Sandra Mast	Germany	11.16	11.26	10.44	x	11.36	x	11.36	
7	Nursuhana Ramlan	Malaysia	10.06	10.31	9.75	10.40	10.71	x	10.71	
8	Eddy Guerrero	Venezuela	10.00	x	9.88	10.22	10.11	8.78	10.22	PB
9	Evangelia Ziska	Greece	9.76	9.74	9.73				9.76	
10	Leslie Mendoza	Mexico	9.05	x	9.32				9.32	
11	Ayşegül Tahtakale	Turkey	8.41	x	8.31				8.41	

=== F32–34 ===
Rank	Athlete	Nationality	Class	1	2	3	4	5	6	Best	Score	Notes
1st place, gold medalist(s)	Birgit Kober	Germany	F34	10.25	x	x	-	-	-	10.25	1112	WR
2nd place, silver medalist(s)	Louise Ellery	Australia	F32	x	5.90	5.79	x	5.75	-	5.90	895	PR
3rd place, bronze medalist(s)	Maroua Ibrahmi	Tunisia	F32	5.47	5.60	5.75	5.11	5.43	5.25	5.75	869	RR
4	Marjaana Huovinen	Finland	F34	7.55	7.49	7.64	7.14	7.29	7.37	7.64	866	PB
5	Maria Stamatoula	Greece	F32	5.66	x	4.92	x	x	x	5.66	853	
6	Brydee Moore	Australia	F33	3.93	x	5.84	5.55	6.05	x	6.05	850	
7	Mounia Gasmi	Algeria	F32	x	x	5.43	5.16	x	5.56	5.56	835	
8	Frances Herrmann	Germany	F34	6.95	7.27	7.36	6.88	7.04	7.21	7.36	827	
9	Veronika Doronina	Russia	F34	7.06	6.50	7.03	-	-	-	7.06	784	
10	Marie Brämer-Skowronek	Germany	F34	7.01	x	6.98	-	-	-	7.01	776	
11	Elena Burdykina	Russia	F34	6.83	6.77	6.83	-	-	-	6.83	748	
12	Zandile Nhlapo	South Africa	F34	5.37	x	6.41	-	-	-	6.41	680	SB
13	Gemma Prescott	Great Britain	F32	3.61	4.19	4.14	-	-	-	4.19	535	
-	Thuraya Alzaabi	United Arab Emirates	F34	x	x	x	-	-	-	NM	0	

=== F35/36 ===
Rank	Athlete	Nationality	Class	1	2	3	4	5	6	Result	Score	Notes
1st place, gold medalist(s)	Mariia Pomazan	Ukraine	F35	11.15	11.42	12.22	11.39	x	x	12.22	1062	WR
2nd place, silver medalist(s)	Wang Jun	China	F35	10.59	11.40	12.00	11.62	11.81	12.07	12.07	1056	RR
3rd place, bronze medalist(s)	Qing Wu	China	F36	10.60	9.26	10.18	10.16	10.64	10.44	10.64	1041	WR
4	Kath Proudfoot	Australia	F36	9.621	9.24	x	8.49	9.63	9.76	9.76	984	
5	Alla Malchyk	Ukraine	F36	8.73	8.83	8.83	9.09	8.82	9.01	9.09	923	SB
6	Renata Chilewska	Poland	F35	9.50	9.54	x	8.89	x	9.07	9.54	873	
7	Jiongyu Bao	China	F35	8.24	8.47	8.18	8.33	8.44	8.38	8.47	729	PB
8	Marivana Oliveira	Brazil	F35	7.94	7.92	8.15	x	8.13	x	8.15	677	RR
9	Chenelle van Zyl	South Africa	F35	6.28	x	7.83				7.83	621	
10	Perla Muñoz	Argentina	F35	7.35	7.49	7.54				7.54	567	

=== F37 ===
Rank	Athlete	Nationality	1	2	3	4	5	6	Result	Notes
1st place, gold medalist(s)	Mi Na	China	12.20	11.71	11.94	11.01	11.30	11.05	12.20	WR
2nd place, silver medalist(s)	Xu Qiuping	China	10.36	10.50	11.04	10.93	10.42	x	11.04	PB
3rd place, bronze medalist(s)	Eva Berná	Czech Republic	10.16	10.37	11.00	10.11	x	x	11.00	RR
4	Shirlene Coelho	Brazil	10.27	10.29	10.01	9.50	10.57	10.60	10.60	RR
5	Qianqian Jia	China	9.85	x	9.57	10.35	9.99	x	10.35	PB
6	Viktorya Yasevych	Ukraine	9.15	x	9.56	x	9.93	x	9.93	PB
7	Beverley Jones	Great Britain	8.58	9.62	9.85	9.46	9.35	8.92	9.85	
8	Taiga Kantane	Latvia	8.88	9.05	8.98	9.01	9.21	8.41	9.21	SB
9	Yomaira Cohen	Venezuela	8.72	8.36	8.61				8.72	PB
10	Liene Grutzite	Latvia	7.83	7.11	6.78				7.83	

=== F40 ===
Rank	Athlete	Nationality	1	2	3	4	5	6	Result	Notes
1st place, gold medalist(s)	Raoua Tlili	Tunisia	9.42	9.86	9.35	9.64	9.77	9.83	9.86	WR
2nd place, silver medalist(s)	Menggenjimisu	China	7.95	9.13	8.73	x	8.49	8.82	9.13	RR
3rd place, bronze medalist(s)	Najat El Garaa	Morocco	8.23	8.40	x	8.04	8.30	8.62	8.62	PB
4	Laila El Garaa	Morocco	7.33	7.49	7.81	7.69	8.10	x	8.10	SB
5	Daria Kabiesz	Poland	7.90	x	7.86	x	7.77	x	7.90	
6	Fatiha Mehdi	Algeria	6.49	6.02	x	5.89	6.37	6.00	6.49	
7	Marijana Goranović	Montenegro	6.09	6.17	6.35	5.77	6.06	6.23	6.35	PB

=== F42/44 ===
Rank	Athlete	Nationality	Class	1	2	3	4	5	6	Result	Score	Notes
1st place, gold medalist(s)	Juan Yao	China	F44	12.85	12.66	13.05	12.39	12.97	12.73	13.05	1055	WR
2nd place, silver medalist(s)	Yue Yang	China	F44	11.53	11.46	12.02	x	11.72	12.22	12.22	980	SB
3rd place, bronze medalist(s)	Michaela Floeth	Germany	F44	11.50	12.16	11.41	11.93	x	12.21	12.21	979	SB
4	Sanela Redžić	Bosnia and Herzegovina	F42	8.64	8.31	x	8.59	8.47	8.08	8.64	809	PB
5	Jelena Vuković	Croatia	F42	7.85	7.62	7.79	7.72	x	7.32	7.85	683	
6	Leitu Viliamu	Samoa	F42	5.18	4.85	5.32	5.03	4.35	4.06	5.32	257	SB

=== F54–56 ===
Rank	Athlete	Nationality	Class	1	2	3	4	5	6	Best	Score	Notes
1st place, gold medalist(s)	Yang Liwan	China	F54	7.44	7.50	7.27	6.80	x	6.71	7.50	1057	WR
2nd place, silver medalist(s)	Marianne Buggenhagen	Germany	F55	8.27	8.21	8.32	7.91	8.16	7.82	8.32	946	
3rd place, bronze medalist(s)	Angela Madsen	United States	F56	8.48	8.40	8.63	7.91	8.18	8.88	8.88	934	PR
4	Martina Willing	Germany	F56	8.80	8.46	8.86	8.40	8.38	8.66	8.86	931	
5	Hania Aidi	Tunisia	F54	6.30	5.21	5.92	5.96	6.24	5.94	6.30	904	SB
6	Tatjana Majcen	Slovenia	F54	6.11	5.93	5.82	6.03	6.24	6.02	6.24	894	
7	Fadhila Nafati	Tunisia	F54	6.02	6.21	5.92	6.05	6.13	5.94	6.21	888	
8	Irena Perminiene	Lithuania	F54	5.77	6.02	6.14	x	4.88	5.95	6.14	876	
9	Eva Kacanu	Czech Republic	F54	5.79	5.98	5.47	-	-	-	5.98	846	SB
10	Marziyeh Sedighi Saghinsara	Iran	F54	5.69	5.86	5.93	-	-	-	5.93	837	
11	Patricia Ndidi Amaka Nnaji	Nigeria	F55	x	7.37	6.95	-	-	-	7.37	813	RR
12	Tanja Cerkvenik	Slovenia	F55	6.75	6.84	6.48	-	-	-	6.84	721	
13	Daniela Todorova	Bulgaria	F55	6.78	6.83	6.54	-	-	-	6.83	719	
14	Yanive Torres Martinez	Colombia	F54	4.37	5.20	4.85	-	-	-	5.20	673	
15	Milka Milinkovic	Croatia	F55	5.80	6.46	6.12	-	-	-	6.46	647	
16	Ruth Aguilar Fulgencio	Spain	F55	5.29	5.28	5.19	-	-	-	5.29	393	PB

=== F57/58 ===
Rank	Athlete	Nationality	Class	1	2	3	4	5	6	Best	Score	Notes
1st place, gold medalist(s)	Angeles Ortiz Hernandez	Mexico	F58	11.10	11.39	11.43	11.12	10.61	11.02	11.43	1015	WR
2nd place, silver medalist(s)	Stela Eneva	Bulgaria	F58	11.14	11.22	11.38	10.89	10.92	x	11.38	1012	RR
3rd place, bronze medalist(s)	Eucharia Iyiazi	Nigeria	F58	10.32	10.26	11.11	9.79	10.20	x	11.11	997	RR
4	Safia Djelal	Algeria	F58	10.05	10.31	10.52	9.50	x	9.94	10.52	958	SB
5	Ilke Wyludda	Germany	F58	9.89	10.01	10.16	9.89	10.23	9.95	10.23	937	PB
6	Larisa Volik	Russia	F57	10.05	10.05	9.99	x	x	9.66	10.05	931	RR
7	Nassima Saifi	Algeria	F58	9.71	9.77	x	8.73	x	9.68	9.77	899	
8	Catalina Rosales Montiel	Mexico	F58	9.32	9.06	9.03	9.07	x	x	9.32	857	SB
9	Ivanka Koleva	Bulgaria	F57	8.48	8.79	9.10	-	-	-	9.10	845	SB
10	Li Ling	China	F57	8.71	8.92	x	-	-	-	8.92	826	SB
11	Evelyne Tuitavake	France	F58	6.66	7.59	8.09	-	-	-	8.09	717	
12	Olga Sergienko	Russia	F57	x	7.87	7.55	-	-	-	7.87	700	
13	Mary Nakhumicha Zakayo	Kenya	F57	7.70	7.63	x	-	-	-	7.70	677	
14	Grace Nwaozuzu	Nigeria	F58	7.07	7.60	7.57	-	-	-	7.60	651	
15	Hellen Glenda Saohaga	Solomon Islands	F57	x	5.00	5.23	-	-	-	5.23	298	SB
16	Nephtalie Jean Louis	Haiti	F57	4.75	x	x	-	-	-	4.75	228	SB
17	Rhodah Mutale	Zambia	F58	4.55	4.48	4.59	-	-	-	4.59	200	SB
-	Madinat Abdullayeva	Azerbaijan	F57	x	x	x	-	-	-	NM	0	
-	Nadia Medjmedj	Algeria	F57	x	x	x	-	-	-	NM	0	
