= 2011 IPC Athletics World Championships – Women's shot put =

The women's shot put at the 2011 IPC Athletics World Championships was held at the QEII Stadium from 22–29 January.

== Medalists ==
Class	Gold	Silver	Bronze
F11	Liangmin Zhang; China	Yuclesy Pinto; Venezuela	Yesenia Maria Restrepo Munoz; Colombia
F12	Tamara Sivakova; Belarus	Orysia Ilchyna; Ukraine	Marta Prokofyeva; Russia
F20	Ewa Durska; Poland	Svitlana Kudelya; Ukraine	Ines Fernandes; Portugal
F32/33/34	Birgit Kober; Germany	Maria Stamatoula; Greece	Louise Ellery; Australia
F35/36	Mariia Pomazan; Ukraine	Wu Qing; China	Alla Malchyk; Ukraine
F37	Mi Na; China	Xu Qiuping; China	Shirlene Coelho; Brazil
F40	Raoua Tlili; Tunisia	Menggenjimisu; China	Laila El Garaa; Morocco
F42/44/46	Michaela Floeth; Germany	Yajuan Jin; China	Yongyuan Zhong; China
F52/53	Estela Salas; Mexico	Deepa Malik; India	Martha Gustafson; Canada
F54/55/56	Marianne Buggenhagen; Germany	Tatjana Majcen; Slovenia	Eva Kacanu; Czech Republic
F57/58	Angeles Ortiz Hernandez; Mexico	Stela Eneva; Bulgaria	Nadia Medjmedj; Algeria

== F11 ==
The Women's shot put, F11 was held on January 26

- F11 = visual impairment: may range from no light perception in either eye to light perception with the inability to recognise the shape of a hand at any distance or in any direction.

=== Results ===
==== Final ====
Rank	Athlete	Nationality	#1	#2	#3	#4	#5	#6	Result	Notes
1st place, gold medalist(s)	Liangmin Zhang	China	9.02	9.61	8.72	x	x	x	9.61	CR
2nd place, silver medalist(s)	Yuclesy Pinto	Venezuela	7.85	7.35	7.40	6.43	7.27	7.63	7.85	SB
3rd place, bronze medalist(s)	Yesenia Maria Restrepo Munoz	Colombia	7.64	x	6.74	x	x	6.80	7.64	SB
4	Tania Lorena Jimenez Manzanarez	Mexico	x	6.83	x	x	6.05	7.11	7.11	
5	Rita Elena Osorio Cota	Mexico	7.05	6.76	6.67	6.59	6.30	x	7.05	
6	Ailish Dunne	Ireland	6.30	6.54	6.40	6.04	6.59	6.62	6.62	
7	Nadine Lattimore	Ireland	6.12	5.91	5.73	6.05	5.89	5.99	6.12	

Key: CR = Championship Record, SB = Season Best

== F12 ==
The Women's shot put, F12 was held on January 26

- F12 = visual impairment: may have the ability to recognise the shape of a hand, have a visual acuity of 2/60 and/or visual field of less than 5 degrees.

=== Results ===
==== Final ====
Rank	Athlete	Nationality	#1	#2	#3	#4	#5	#6	Result	Notes
1st place, gold medalist(s)	Tamara Sivakova	Belarus	11.74	12.26	12.26	11.38	11.80	x	12.26	
2nd place, silver medalist(s)	Orysia Ilchyna	Ukraine	10.74	x	11.27	11.54	11.45	x	11.54	
3rd place, bronze medalist(s)	Marta Prokofyeva	Russia	10.92	11.11	11.29	11.03	11.02	11.21	11.29	
4	Marija Ivekovic	Croatia	10.89	10.76	10.97	10.48	x	10.83	10.97	
5	Mariela Almada	Argentina	10.31	10.30	10.56	10.60	x	10.33	10.60	
6	Jessica Castellano	Spain	10.37	10.36	10.24	x	10.17	10.13	10.37	
7	Alvarez Rebeca Valenzuela	Mexico	8.53	8.92	9.26	9.45	9.90	9.33	9.90	
8	Hamela Devi Enikutty	Malaysia	9.24	x	9.19	8.55	x	8.88	9.24	
9	Natallia Eder	Austria	9.16	x	8.73				9.16	
10	Sumeyye Ozcan	Turkey	6.44	5.28					6.44	

== F20 ==
The Women's shot put, F20 was held on January 28

- F20 = intellectual disability.

=== Results ===
==== Final ====
Rank	Athlete	Nationality	#1	#2	#3	#4	#5	#6	Result	Notes
1st place, gold medalist(s)	Ewa Durska	Poland	12.55	13.15	13.47	x	x	12.95	13.47	
2nd place, silver medalist(s)	Svitlana Kudelya	Ukraine	11.20	11.84	11.35	x	11.95	x	11.95	SB
3rd place, bronze medalist(s)	Ines Fernandes	Portugal	11.21	11.01	10.82	11.30	11.16	11.45	11.45	
4	Given Ratsoma	South Africa	10.32	10.21	10.31	10.46	10.31	10.13	10.46	SB
5	Nicole Nicole Vernon	Australia	9.01	x	9.28	9.96	9.92	9.54	9.96	
6	Evangelia Ziska	Greece	8.45	x	8.39	8.97	9.27	9.03	9.27	
7	Eddy Guerrero	Venezuela	x	8.73	7.56	x	x	8.96	8.96	
8	Zoi Mantoudi	Greece	8.69	8.79	8.48	8.23	8.30	x	8.79	
9	Valasia Kyrgiovanaki	Greece	8.31	8.38	7.91				8.38	
10	Lai Shan Yeung	Hong Kong	7.55	6.54	7.74				7.74	
	Krestina Zhukova	Russia	x	x	x				NM	

Key: SB = Season Best, NM = No Mark

== F32/33/34 ==
The Women's shot put, F32/33/34 was held on January 23 with the medal ceremony on January 24

F32/33/34:

- F32 = poor functional strength in arms, legs and trunk, able to propel a wheelchair, compete in a wheelchair and may throw a club or discus from a throwing frame.
- F33 = some degree of trunk movement when pushing a wheelchair, forward trunk movement is limited during forceful pushing, throwing movements are mainly from the arm, compete in a wheelchair or from a throwing frame.
- F34 = good functional strength with minimal limitation or control problems in the arms or trunk, compete in a wheelchair or from a throwing frame.

=== Results ===
==== Final ====
Rank	Athlete	Nationality	#1	#2	#3	#4	#5	#6	Result	Points	Notes
1st place, gold medalist(s)	Birgit Kober	Germany	8.59	9.30	x	9.02	x	x	9.30	1122	WR
2nd place, silver medalist(s)	Maria Stamatoula	Greece	5.55	6.60	6.00	-	-	-	6.60	1053	WR
3rd place, bronze medalist(s)	Louise Ellery	Australia	5.95	6.31	x	x	5.62	6.16	6.31	1017	AR
4	Birgit Pohl	Germany	7.21	7.94	7.99	7.54	x	7.77	7.99	1013	
5	Lucyna Kornobys	Poland	5.67	5.92	5.63	6.12	6.12	5.86	6.12	938	=CR
6	Jessica Hamill	New Zealand	6.96	7.07	7.34	6.91	7.18	7.02	7.34	938	AR
7	Gemma Prescott	Great Britain	5.68	5.33	5.40	4.87	5.35	5.31	5.68	923	
8	Frances Herrmann	Germany	7.06	7.01	x	6.76	6.62	6.77	7.06	900	
9	Mounia Gasmi	Algeria	x	5.36	4.94				5.36	866	AR
10	Marjaana Huovinen	Finland	6.35	6.76	x				6.76	857	SB
11	Maroua Ibrahmi	Tunisia	5.02	5.08	4.92				5.08	811	
12	Elena Burdykina	Russia	x	6.10	6.24				6.24	773	
13	Robyn Stawski	United States	x	5.17	5.20				5.20	772	
14	Thuraya Alzaabi	United Arab Emirates	x	6.23	x				6.23	771	

Key: WR = World Record, =CR = Equal Championship Record, AR = Area Record, SB = Season Best

== F35/36 ==
The Women's shot put, F35/36 was held on January 27 with the medal ceremony on January 28

F35/36:

- F35 = good static balance, problems in dynamic balance, may need assistive devices for walking but not when standing or throwing, may have sufficient lower extremity function to execute a run up when throwing.
- F36 = walk without assistance or assistive devices, have more control problems with upper than lower limbs. All four limbs are involved, dynamic often better than static balance. Hand control, grasp and release are affected when throwing.

=== Results ===
==== Final ====
Rank	Athlete	Nationality	#1	#2	#3	#4	#5	#6	Result	Points	Notes
1st place, gold medalist(s)	Mariia Pomazan	Ukraine	8.89	9.47	10.05	x	10.05	10.61	10.61	1035	WR
2nd place, silver medalist(s)	Qing Wu	China	9.33	9.10	9.66	9.03	x	9.25	9.66	1005	WR
3rd place, bronze medalist(s)	Alla Malchyk	Ukraine	8.61	x	9.00	8.44	9.02	9.28	9.28	975	
4	Katherine Proudfoot	Australia	x	8.39	9.13	8.55	8.44	8.67	9.13	962	SB
5	Renata Chilewska	Poland	8.78	8.91	9.02	8.71	9.20	8.93	9.20	927	SB
6	Noni Thompson	Australia	7.04	7.37	7.98	7.59	6.86	x	7.98	826	SB
7	Chanelle van Zyl	South Africa	7.90	8.04	6.34	6.93	7.56	7.42	8.04	778	

Key: WR = World Record, SB = Season Best

== F37 ==
The Women's shot put, F37 was held on January 24 with the medal ceremony on January 25

- F37 = spasticity in an arm and leg on the same side, good functional ability on the non impaired side, better development, good arm and hand control and follow through.

=== Results ===
==== Final ====
Rank	Athlete	Nationality	#1	#2	#3	#4	#5	#6	Result	Notes
1st place, gold medalist(s)	Mi Na	China	10.81	10.19	10.62	x	11.16	-	11.16	CR
2nd place, silver medalist(s)	Xu Qiuping	China	9.88	9.93	9.62	10.23	10.01	9.91	10.23	SB
3rd place, bronze medalist(s)	Shirlene Coelho	Brazil	9.74	9.26	10.10	10.21	9.72	9.61	10.21	AR
4	Eva Berna	Czech Republic	9.86	x	9.90	9.93	9.93	x	9.93	
5	Beverley Jones	Great Britain	9.89	x	9.20	x	x	x	9.89	SB
6	Qianqian Jia	China	x	9.77	x	9.83	9.55	9.48	9.83	SB
7	Viktorya Yasevych	Ukraine	8.68	9.45	9.04	x	8.78	x	9.45	SB
8	Taiga Kantane	Latvia	x	x	9.24	8.82	9.18	8.98	9.24	

Key: CR = Championship Record, SB = Season Best, AR = Area Record

== F40 ==
The Women's shot put, F40 was held on January 23

F40 = dwarfism.

Tunisia's Raoua Tlili took the gold medal, China's Menggenjimisu the silver, while the Moroccan sisters Laila El Garaa and Najat El Garaa placed 3rd and 4th at the event.

=== Results ===
==== Final ====
Rank	Athlete	Nationality	#1	#2	#3	#4	#5	#6	Result	Notes
1st place, gold medalist(s)	Raoua Tlili	Tunisia	8.62	9.23	x	8.89	8.36	x	9.23	CR
2nd place, silver medalist(s)	Menggenjimisu	China	8.29	8.56	8.64	8.46	x	8.58	8.64	AR
3rd place, bronze medalist(s)	Laila El Garaa	Morocco	7.78	8.04	8.21	8.42	8.54	x	8.54	
4	Najat El Garaa	Morocco	8.38	8.35	8.47	8.41	8.17	8.18	8.47	SB
5	Sophie Hancock	Great Britain	7.22	7.36	7.54	7.08	7.33	7.32	7.54	AR
6	Daria Kabiesz	Poland	6.72	6.39	x	6.29	6.79	6.92	6.92	
7	Marijana Goranovic	Montenegro	x	5.30	4.87	5.17	4.83	5.10	5.30	

Key: CR = Championship Record, SB = Season Best, AR = Area Record

== F42/44/46 ==
The Women's shot put, F42/44/46 was held on January 22

F42/44/46:

- F42 = single above knee amputation or equivalent impairments.
- F44 = single below knee amputation or equivalent impairments.
- F46 = single above or below elbow amputation or equivalent impairments.

=== Results ===
==== Final ====
Rank	Athlete	Nationality	#1	#2	#3	#4	#5	#6	Result	Points	Notes
1st place, gold medalist(s)	Michaela Floeth	Germany	12.12	11.66	12.56	12.06	11.17	11.74	12.56	1012	CR
2nd place, silver medalist(s)	Yajuan Jin	China	11.91	12.47	11.81	11.83	x	11.72	12.47	1004	
3rd place, bronze medalist(s)	Yongyuan Zhong	China	9.35	9.64	9.51	9.70	9.47	9.56	9.70	957	CR
4	Juan Yao	China	10.72	11.17	11.03	11.38	11.35	11.46	11.46	900	
5	Jana Schmidt	Germany	8.47	8.40	9.11	8.89	9.03	9.10	9.11	878	AR
6	Yue Yang	China	9.85	10.24	10.81	10.90	10.78	10.56	10.90	836	
7	Holly Robinson	New Zealand	8.35	8.01	8.35	8.43	7.76	7.65	8.43	442	

Key: CR = Championship Record, AR = Asian Record

== F52/53 ==
The Women's shot put, F52/53 was held on January 23

F52/53:

- F52 = good shoulder, elbow and wrist function, poor to normal finger flexion and extension, no trunk or leg function.
- F53 = normal upper limb function, no abdominal, leg or lower spinal function.

=== Results ===
==== Final ====
Rank	Athlete	Nationality	#1	#2	#3	#4	#5	#6	Result	Points	Notes
1st place, gold medalist(s)	Estela Salas	Mexico	3.58	3.73	3.56	3.67	3.67	3.76	3.76	747	
2nd place, silver medalist(s)	Deepa Malik	India	3.27	3.32	x	2.97	3.59	3.56	3.59	687	
3rd place, bronze medalist(s)	Martha Gustafson	Canada	3.31	3.23	3.45	2.70	3.38	x	3.45	540	CR
4	Rosemary Tallon	Ireland	2.84	2.58	3.15	2.95	3.15	3.04	3.15	495	

Key: CR = Championship Record

== F54/55/56 ==
The Women's shot put, F54/55/56 was held on January 29

F54/55/56:

- F54 = normal upper limb function, no abdominal or lower spinal function.
- F55 = normal upper limb function, may have partial to almost completely normal trunk function, no leg function.
- F56 = normal upper limb and trunk function, some leg function, high bilateral above knee amputation.

=== Results ===
==== Final ====
Rank	Athlete	Nationality	#1	#2	#3	#4	#5	#6	Result	Points	Notes
1st place, gold medalist(s)	Marianne Buggenhagen	Germany	8.33	8.48	8.21	8.24	8.22	8.28	8.48	964	SB
2nd place, silver medalist(s)	Tatjana Majcen	Slovenia	6.51	6.50	6.64	6.41	6.32	6.37	6.64	957	CR
3rd place, bronze medalist(s)	Eva Kacanu	Czech Republic	5.84	5.92	6.34	5.75	x	5.97	6.34	911	
4	Irena Perminienė	Lithuania	5.76	6.20	6.11	5.90	5.87	6.03	6.20	887	
5	Hania Aidi	Tunisia	5.90	6.01	5.90	5.74	5.49	5.77	6.01	852	
6	Martina Willing	Germany	8.03	7.82	8.22	7.97	8.20	8.22	8.22	850	CR
7	Veronica Azucena Saucedo Miranda	Mexico	7.24	7.11	7.27	5.85	6.76	6.71	7.27	700	
8	Tanja Cerkvenik	Slovenia	6.59	6.57	6.67	5.60	6.45	6.19	6.67	688	
9	Feixia Dong	China	6.44	6.61	5.37				6.61	677	

Key: CR = Championship Record, SB = Season Best

== F57/58 ==
The Women's shot put, F57/58 was held on January 23

F57/58:

- F57 = normal upper limb and trunk function, may have bilateral above knee amputations.
- F58 = normal upper limb and trunk function, a bilateral below knee amputation or single above knee amputation.

=== Results ===
==== Final ====
Rank	Athlete	Nationality	#1	#2	#3	#4	#5	#6	Result	Points	Notes
1st place, gold medalist(s)	Angeles Ortiz Hernandez	Mexico	10.35	10.86	11.21	9.68	10.23	10.90	11.21	1002	WR
2nd place, silver medalist(s)	Stela Eneva	Bulgaria	10.38	10.54	10.49	10.44	10.21	10.48	10.54	960	AR
3rd place, bronze medalist(s)	Nadia Medjmedj	Algeria	8.95	8.50	9.48	9.26	9.24	9.23	9.48	901	
4	Safia Djelal	Algeria	8.58	8.98	9.12	x	x	x	9.12	837	
5	Ivanka Koleva	Bulgaria	8.09	8.60	8.65	8.10	8.45	8.45	8.65	817	
6	Ling Li	China	x	8.12	8.62	7.31	x	7.95	8.62	814	
7	Jeanette Thompson	United States	8.55	8.69	8.31	8.29	8.60	8.85	8.85	808	
8	Catherine Callahan	United States	7.72	8.28	8.06	8.25	7.87	x	8.28	774	AR
9	Nassima Saifi	Algeria	8.22	8.42	8.27				8.42	759	
10	Evelyne Tuitavake	France	x	x	8.23				8.23	735	
11	Mary Nakhumica	Kenya	7.80	7.91	x				7.91	728	
12	Olga Sergienko	Russia	7.69	7.74	x				7.74	705	
13	Leilei Gao	China	6.90	x	7.54				7.54	643	
14	Katalin Szmrtnik	Hungary	4.76	x	4.93				4.93	269	

Key: WR = World Record, AR = Asian Record

== See also ==
- List of IPC world records in athletics
