= 2012 IPC Athletics European Championships – Women's shot put =

The women's shot put at the 2012 IPC Athletics European Championships was held at Stadskanaal Stadium from 24–28 July.

== Medalists ==
Results given by IPC Athletics.

| Class | Gold | Silver | Bronze |
|---|---|---|---|
| F11/12 | Marta Prokofyeva; Russia | Tamara Sivakova; Belarus | Orysia Ilchyna; Ukraine |
| F20 | Svitlana Kudelya; Ukraine | Ewa Durska; Poland | Anastasiia Mysnyk; Ukraine |
| F32/33 | Tetyana Yakybchuk; Ukraine | Maria Stamatoula; Greece | Krisztina Kalman; Hungary |
| F34 | Birgit Kober; Germany | Frances Herrmann; Germany | Marjaana Huovinen; Finland |
| F35/36 | Mariia Pomazan; Ukraine | Alla Malchyk; Ukraine | N/A |
| F37 | Eva Berna; Czech Republic | Beverley Jones; United Kingdom | Viktorya Yasevych; Ukraine |
| F40/42/44 | Darija Kabeš; Poland | Anet Jelita; Germany | Sanela Redžić; Bosnia and Herzegovina |
| F54/55/56 | Marianne Buggenhagen; Germany | Irena Perminienė; Lithuania | Tatjana Majcen; Slovenia |
| F57/58 | Stela Eneva; Bulgaria | Larisa Volik; Russia | N/A |

== Results ==
=== F11/12 ===
| Rank | Class | Athlete | 1 | 2 | 3 | 4 | 5 | 6 | Best | Points | Notes |
|---|---|---|---|---|---|---|---|---|---|---|---|
| 1st place, gold medalist(s) | F12 | Marta Prokofyeva; Russia | 11.77 | 12.31 | X | 12.01 | 12.34 | 12.56 | 12.56 | 975 | SB |
| 2nd place, silver medalist(s) | F12 | Tamara Sivakova; Belarus | 12.17 | 12.30 | 11.84 | 11.70 | X | 12.27 | 12.30 | 961 | SB |
| 3rd place, bronze medalist(s) | F12 | Orysia Ilchyna; Ukraine | 10.87 | 11.25 | 11.24 | 9.82 | 10.86 | 11.30 | 11.30 | 895 | |
| 4 | F11 | Nadine Lattimore; Ireland | 5.62 | 7.25 | 6.82 | 5.86 | 6.49 | X | 7.25 | 877 | |
| 5 | F12 | Dangutė Skėrienė; Lithuania | 10.37 | 9.98 | 9.87 | 9.21 | 10.19 | 9.69 | 10.37 | 815 | |
| 6 | F12 | Natalija Eder; Austria | 10.35 | 9.45 | 8.77 | 9.70 | 10.06 | 9.77 | 10.35 | 813 | |
| 7 | F11 | Ailish Dunne; Ireland | 6.07 | X | X | 5.80 | 6.35 | 6.50 | 6.50 | 783 | |
| 8 | F11 | Öznur Alumur; Turkey | 5.85 | 5.48 | 6.06 | 5.62 | 5.48 | 5.93 | 6.06 | 705 | SB |
| 9 | F12 | Elena Favaretto; Italy | 6.53 | 6.77 | 6.31 | | | | 6.77 | 345 | |
| 10 | F12 | Sumeyye Ozcan; Turkey | 6.45 | 6.57 | 6.22 | | | | 6.57 | 316 | |

=== F20 ===
| Rank | Class | Athlete | 1 | 2 | 3 | 4 | 5 | 6 | Best | Notes |
|---|---|---|---|---|---|---|---|---|---|---|
| 1st place, gold medalist(s) | F20 | Svitlana Kudelya; Ukraine | X | X | 11.25 | 12.00 | 11.88 | 12.60 | 12.60 | SB |
| 2nd place, silver medalist(s) | F20 | Ewa Durska; Poland | X | X | 11.27 | 12.09 | 12.16 | X | 12.16 | |
| 3rd place, bronze medalist(s) | F20 | Anastasiia Mysnyk; Ukraine | 11.62 | 11.41 | 11.61 | 10.84 | 11.11 | X | 11.62 | |
| 4 | F20 | Inês Fernandes; Portugal | 11.04 | X | X | 11.36 | 11.40 | 11.55 | 11.55 | |
| 5 | F20 | Sandra Mast; Germany | X | 11.28 | 10.78 | 10.69 | 11.24 | 11.09 | 11.28 | |
| 6 | F20 | Sirly Tiik; Estonia | 10.72 | X | 11.11 | 11.13 | 11.02 | 10.87 | 11.13 | SB |
| 7 | F20 | Evangelia Ziska; Greece | 9.83 | 9.29 | 9.24 | 9.67 | 9.16 | X | 9.83 | SB |
| 8 | F20 | Zoi Mantoudi; Greece | 9.73 | 9.34 | 9.44 | 9.40 | 9.77 | 9.26 | 9.77 | SB |
| 9 | F20 | Valasia Kyrgiovanaki; Greece | 9.22 | 8.54 | 8.80 | | | | 9.22 | |
| 10 | F20 | Hulda Sigurjonsdottir; Iceland | 9.03 | 8.76 | 9.04 | | | | 9.04 | |
| 11 | F20 | Maria Maganinho; Portugal | 8.83 | X | 8.58 | | | | 8.83 | |
| 12 | F20 | Aysegul Tahtakale; Turkey | X | 8.59 | 8.39 | | | | 8.59 | SB |

=== F32/33 ===
| Rank | Class | Athlete | 1 | 2 | 3 | 4 | 5 | 6 | Best | Points | Notes |
|---|---|---|---|---|---|---|---|---|---|---|---|
| 1st place, gold medalist(s) | F33 | Tetyana Yakybchuk; Ukraine | 5.52 | 5.61 | X | 5.69 | X | 5.28 | 5.69 | 786 | SB |
| 2nd place, silver medalist(s) | F32 | Maria Stamatoula; Greece | X | X | X | X | 4.97 | X | 4.97 | 716 | |
| 3rd place, bronze medalist(s) | F32 | Krisztina Kalman; Hungary | X | 3.00 | 3.05 | 2.75 | X | 3.27 | 3.27 | 313 | |
| 4 | F32 | Vendula Pisarikova; Czech Republic | 2.62 | X | X | X | 2.93 | X | 2.93 | 238 | |

=== F34 ===
| Rank | Class | Athlete | 1 | 2 | 3 | 4 | 5 | 6 | Best | Notes |
|---|---|---|---|---|---|---|---|---|---|---|
| 1st place, gold medalist(s) | F34 | Birgit Kober; Germany | 9.68 | X | 9.70 | X | X | 10.06 | 10.06 | WR |
| 2nd place, silver medalist(s) | F34 | Frances Herrmann; Germany | 6.19 | X | 7.08 | 6.69 | 6.97 | 7.06 | 7.08 | |
| 3rd place, bronze medalist(s) | F34 | Marjaana Huovinen; Finland | 6.64 | 6.96 | 6.94 | X | X | 7.00 | 7.00 | |
| 4 | F34 | Elena Burdykina; Russia | 6.12 | 6.27 | 6.57 | 6.34 | X | 6.81 | 6.81 | |
| 5 | F34 | Veronika Doronina; Russia | 6.80 | X | X | 5.83 | X | 6.62 | 6.80 | SB |
| 6 | F34 | Marie Brämer-Skowronek; Germany | 6.69 | 6.43 | 6.70 | 6.75 | 6.55 | 6.57 | 6.75 | SB |

=== F35/36 ===
| Rank | Class | Athlete | 1 | 2 | 3 | 4 | 5 | 6 | Best | Points | Notes |
|---|---|---|---|---|---|---|---|---|---|---|---|
| 1st place, gold medalist(s) | F35 | Mariia Pomazan; Ukraine | 10.15 | 11.34 | 9.94 | X | 8.89 | 11.07 | 11.34 | 1021 | WR |
| 2nd place, silver medalist(s) | F36 | Alla Malchyk; Ukraine | 7.84 | 8.54 | 8.87 | 8.22 | 8.57 | 8.42 | 8.76 | 887 | |
| 3 | F35 | Renata Chilewska; Poland | 9.07 | 9.59 | 9.41 | 9.61 | 9.42 | 9.19 | 9.61 | 881 | SB |

=== F37 ===
| Rank | Class | Athlete | 1 | 2 | 3 | 4 | 5 | 6 | Best | Notes |
|---|---|---|---|---|---|---|---|---|---|---|
| 1st place, gold medalist(s) | F37 | Eva Berna; Czech Republic | 9.73 | 10.24 | 9.69 | 9.97 | 9.89 | 9.45 | 10.24 | |
| 2nd place, silver medalist(s) | F37 | Beverley Jones; United Kingdom | 9.94 | 9.21 | 9.63 | 9.22 | 9.07 | 8.06 | 9.94 | |
| 3rd place, bronze medalist(s) | F37 | Viktorya Yasevych; Ukraine | 8.40 | 8.97 | 9.11 | 9.42 | 8.98 | 8.94 | 9.42 | |
| 4 | F37 | Taiga Kantane; Latvia | 8.86 | 8.33 | 8.95 | 8.47 | 8.62 | 8.99 | 8.99 | |
| 5 | F37 | Liene Grutzite; Latvia | 7.09 | 7.42 | 7.50 | 6.70 | 7.21 | 6.73 | 7.50 | |
| 6 | F37 | Ingebord Gardarsdottir; Iceland | 6.16 | 6.15 | 5.77 | 6.18 | 6.21 | 6.35 | 6.35 | |

=== F40/42/44 ===
| Rank | Class | Athlete | 1 | 2 | 3 | 4 | 5 | 6 | Best | Points | Notes |
|---|---|---|---|---|---|---|---|---|---|---|---|
| 1st place, gold medalist(s) | F40 | Daria Kabiesz; Poland | 7.85 | 7.51 | 7.46 | X | 7.92 | X | 7.92 | 906 | |
| 2nd place, silver medalist(s) | F42 | Anett Jelitte; Germany | 8.00 | 7.85 | 8.72 | 7.75 | 8.76 | 7.70 | 8.76 | 827 | SB |
| 3rd place, bronze medalist(s) | F42 | Sanela Redzic; Bosnia and Herzegovina | 8.37 | X | 8.05 | 8.35 | X | 8.47 | 8.47 | 783 | |
| 4 | F42 | Jelena Vukovic; Croatia | 7.60 | 7.33 | 7.21 | 7.68 | 7.45 | 8.13 | 8.13 | 729 | |
| 5 | F40 | Marijana Goranovic; Montenegro | 6.02 | X | X | 5.61 | 5.89 | 5.73 | 6.02 | 588 | |
| 6 | F42 | Ivita Strode; Latvia | 6.95 | X | X | 6.61 | X | 6.74 | 6.95 | 528 | |
| 7 | F42 | Martina Caironi; Italy | 5.56 | 6.06 | 5.30 | | | | 6.06 | 374 | |

=== F54/55/56 ===
| Rank | Class | Athlete | 1 | 2 | 3 | 4 | 5 | 6 | Best | Points | Notes |
|---|---|---|---|---|---|---|---|---|---|---|---|
| 1st place, gold medalist(s) | F55 | Marianne Buggenhagen; Germany | 7.71 | 8.22 | 7.66 | 8.16 | 7.82 | 7.85 | 8.22 | 934 | |
| 2nd place, silver medalist(s) | F54 | Irena Perminienė; Lithuania | X | 6.23 | 6.35 | 6.08 | 6.09 | 5.95 | 6.35 | 912 | |
| 3rd place, bronze medalist(s) | F54 | Tatjana Majcen; Slovenia | X | 6.30 | 5.91 | X | 6.00 | 5.92 | 6.30 | 904 | |
| 4 | F56 | Martina Willing; Germany | 8.13 | 8.45 | 8.31 | 8.45 | 8.45 | X | 8.45 | 881 | |
| 5 | F54 | Eva Kacanu; Czech Republic | 5.64 | 5.64 | 5.76 | 5.65 | 5.61 | 5.49 | 5.76 | 802 | |
| 6 | F55 | Daniela Todorova; Bulgaria | 6.70 | 6.85 | 5.62 | 6.92 | 7.06 | X | 7.06 | 761 | SB |
| 7 | F56 | Lucyna Kornobys; Poland | 6.77 | 6.49 | 7.05 | 7.20 | 6.96 | 7.15 | 7.20 | 687 | |
| 8 | F55 | Carmen Acunto; Italy | X | 6.21 | X | 6.59 | X | X | 6.59 | 673 | |
| 9 | F56 | Lorraine Regan; Ireland | 6.07 | 6.17 | 6.35 | 6.36 | 6.03 | X | 6.36 | 525 | |
| 10 | F55 | Tanja Cerkvenik; Slovenia | 5.76 | 5.78 | X | 5.81 | 5.58 | 5.43 | 5.81 | 509 | |

=== F57/58 ===
| Rank | Class | Athlete | 1 | 2 | 3 | 4 | 5 | 6 | Best | Points | Notes |
|---|---|---|---|---|---|---|---|---|---|---|---|
| 1st place, gold medalist(s) | F58 | Stela Eneva; Bulgaria | 11.14 | 11.09 | | | | | 11.14 | 998 | ER |
| 2nd place, silver medalist(s) | F57 | Larisa Volik; Russia | 9.25 | X | 9.39 | 9.41 | 9.54 | 9.52 | 9.54 | 888 | |
| 3 | F57 | Ivanka Koleva; Bulgaria | 8.01 | 8.36 | 8.60 | 8.76 | 8.77 | 8.88 | 8.88 | 822 | |

== See also ==
- List of IPC world records in athletics
