= 2011 IPC Athletics World Championships – Women's discus throw =

The women's discus throw at the 2011 IPC Athletics World Championships was held at the QEII Stadium on 22–23, 25 and 29 January.

== Medalists ==
Class	Gold	Silver	Bronze
F12	Marija Ivekovic; Croatia	Liangmin Zhang; China	Orysia Ilchyna; Ukraine
F35/36	Mariia Pomazan; Ukraine	Renata Chilewska; Poland	Kath Proudfoot; Australia
F37	Mi Na; China	Beverley Jones; Great Britain	Xu Qiuping; China
F40	Najat El Garaa; Morocco	Raoua Tlili; Tunisia	Menggenjimisu; China
F51/52/53	Catherine Wayland; Ireland	Zena Cole; United States	Estela Salas; Mexico
F54/55/56	Marianne Buggenhagen; Germany	Feixia Dong; China	Tatjana Majcen; Slovenia
F57/58	Nassima Saifi; Algeria	Stela Eneva; Bulgaria	Nadia Medjmedj; Algeria

== F12 ==
The Women's discus throw, F12 was held on January 22

- The event included both F11 and F12 classified athletes:
  - F11 = visual impairment: may range from no light perception in either eye, to light perception with the inability to recognise the shape of a hand.
  - F12 = visual impairment: may recognise the shape of a hand, have a visual acuity of 2/60 and/or visual field of less than 5 degrees.

China's Liangmin Zhang set a world record for athletes with an F11 classification, with a throw of 40.42.

=== Results ===
==== Final ====
Rank	Athlete	Nationality	#1	#2	#3	#4	#5	#6	Result	Notes
1st place, gold medalist(s)	Marija Iveković	Croatia	x	37.33	40.62	x	37.95	38.20	40.62	
2nd place, silver medalist(s)	Liangmin Zhang	China	36.71	37.46	x	x	40.42	x	40.42	WR
3rd place, bronze medalist(s)	Orysia Ilchyna	Ukraine	34.14	36.99	x	35.99	33.97	38.86	38.86	
4	Siena Christen	Germany	34.11	35.38	32.85	38.17	36.74	33.86	38.17	
5	Claire Williams	Great Britain	37.19	35.46	x	36.94	36.65	x	37.19	
6	Tamara Sivakova	Belarus	34.88	x	33.84	36.90	x	34.82	36.90	
7	Mariela Almada	Argentina	35.89	34.78	33.40	x	35.86	35.02	35.89	
8	Jessica Castellano	Spain	29.90	32.88	x	x	33.53	31.25	33.53	

Key: WR = World Record

== F35/36 ==
The Women's discus throw, F35/36 was held on January 29

- F35/36
  - F35 = good static balance, problems in dynamic balance, may need assistive devices for walking but not when standing or throwing, may have sufficient lower extremity function to do a run up when throwing.
  - F36 = walk without assistance or assistive devices, more control problems with upper than lower limbs. All four limbs are involved. Hand control, grasp and release affected when throwing.

=== Results ===
==== Final ====
Rank	Athlete	Nationality	#1	#2	#3	#4	#5	#6	Result	Points	Notes
1st place, gold medalist(s)	Mariia Pomazan	Ukraine	25.83	27.18	26.59	28.73	x	x	28.73	1073	WR
2nd place, silver medalist(s)	Renata Chilewska	Poland	24.08	24.92	25.22	23.80	24.08	x	25.22	994	SB
3rd place, bronze medalist(s)	Kath Proudfoot	Australia	23.21	23.19	24.52	x	23.35	20.57	24.52	958	CR
4	Wu Qing	China	18.66	18.49	20.38	18.54	21.79	20.29	21.79	850	
5	Chanelle van Zyl	South Africa	20.57	x	x	x	x	17.55	20.57	810	
6	Alla Malchyk	Ukraine	18.98	20.65	20.92	x	20.33	18.70	20.92	808	SB
7	Noni Thompson	Australia	17.09	17.97	15.14	17.03	18.76	x	18.76	687	

Key: WR = World Record, CR = Championship Record, SB = Season Best

== F37 ==
The Women's discus throw, F37 was held on January 23

- F37 = spasticity in an arm and leg on the same side, good functional ability on the non impaired side, good arm and hand control and follow through.

=== Results ===
==== Final ====
Rank	Athlete	Nationality	#1	#2	#3	#4	#5	#6	Result	Notes
1st place, gold medalist(s)	Mi Na	China	29.80	29.69	30.73	30.66	31.46	-	31.46	CR
2nd place, silver medalist(s)	Beverley Jones	Great Britain	24.12	28.81	30.62	26.41	30.19	29.86	30.62	AR
3rd place, bronze medalist(s)	Xu Qiuping	China	27.16	26.35	24.85	26.95	26.02	28.74	28.74	
4	Viktorya Yasevych	Ukraine	26.54	x	23.99	23.03	x	28.14	28.14	SB
5	Qianqian Jia	China	25.00	26.01	x	25.93	26.66	25.96	26.66	SB
6	Eva Berna	Czech Republic	22.84	23.01	26.00	23.27	25.08	23.86	26.00	SB
7	Shirlene Coelho	Brazil	x	25.01	24.42	25.24	25.06	x	25.24	AR
8	Taiga Kantane	Latvia	23.02	22.59	21.64	21.78	17.17	22.34	23.02	

Key: CR = Championship Record, AR = Asian Record, SB = Season Best

== F40 ==
The Women's discus throw, F40 was held on January 29

F40 = dwarfism.

=== Results ===
==== Final ====
Rank	Athlete	Nationality	#1	#2	#3	#4	#5	#6	Result	Notes
1st place, gold medalist(s)	Najat El Garaa	Morocco	x	28.13	26.57	28.36	28.99	x	28.99	CR
2nd place, silver medalist(s)	Raoua Tlili	Tunisia	24.50	26.00	x	28.55	27.71	27.91	28.55	
3rd place, bronze medalist(s)	Menggenjimisu	China	26.34	26.30	26.41	25.08	x	25.26	26.41	
4	Laila El Garaa	Morocco	23.20	22.04	24.40	24.11	26.37	24.98	26.37	
5	Daria Kabiesz	Poland	12.69	21.27	x	20.32	23.31	x	23.31	AR

Key: CR = Championship Record, AR = Area Record

== F51/52/53 ==
The Women's discus throw, F51/52/53 was held on January 29

- F51/52/53
  - F51 = a weakness in shoulder function, the ability to bend but not straighten the elbow joint, no trunk or leg function, no movement in the fingers, can bend the wrists backwards but not forwards.
  - F52 = good shoulder, elbow and wrist function, poor to normal finger flexion and extension, no trunk or leg function.
  - F53 = normal upper limb function, no abdominal, leg or lower spinal function.

=== Results ===
==== Final ====
Rank	Athlete	Nationality	#1	#2	#3	#4	#5	#6	Result	Points	Notes
1st place, gold medalist(s)	Catherine Wayland	Ireland	x	5.53	5.68	5.70	5.89	5.82	5.89	941	SB
2nd place, silver medalist(s)	Zena Cole	United States	4.16	4.79	4.58	4.35	4.76	4.54	4.79	651	
3rd place, bronze medalist(s)	Estela Salas	Mexico	x	11.68	11.95	12.08	11.71	11.86	12.08	568	
4	Martha Gustafson	Canada	9.13	x	8.35	9.56	9.40	8.64	9.56	415	
5	Rosemary Tallon	Ireland	x	7.43	x	7.22	7.04	x	7.43	211	
6	Deepa Malik	India	x	5.63	5.53	5.91	5.69	5.92	5.92	135	

Key: SB = Season Best

== F54/55/56 ==
The Women's discus throw, F54/55/56 was held on January 25

- F54/55/56
  - F54 = normal upper limb function, no abdominal or lower spinal function.
  - F55 = normal upper limb function, may have partial to almost completely normal trunk function, no leg function.
  - F56 = normal upper limb and trunk function, some leg function, may have high bilateral above knee amputation.

=== Results ===
==== Final ====
Rank	Athlete	Nationality	#1	#2	#3	#4	#5	#6	Result	Points	Notes
1st place, gold medalist(s)	Marianne Buggenhagen	Germany	26.28	26.75	26.41	26.44	26.69	x	26.75	973	SB
2nd place, silver medalist(s)	Feixia Dong	China	23.72	23.46	25.57	24.91	25.06	24.56	25.57	941	AR
3rd place, bronze medalist(s)	Tatjana Majcen	Slovenia	x	15.97	x	14.68	15.70	16.13	16.13	833	SB
4	Martina Willing	Germany	20.98	21.38	20.84	20.12	20.75	20.09	21.38	750	
5	Veronica Azucena Saucedo Miranda	Mexico	17.08	17.65	16.88	14.74	16.70	14.20	17.65	560	SB

Key: AR = Area Record, SB = Season Best

== F57/58 ==
The Women's discus throw, F57/58 was held on January 29

- F57/58
  - F57 = normal upper limb and trunk function, may have bilateral above knee amputations.
  - F58 = normal upper limb and trunk function, a bilateral below knee amputation or single above knee amputation.

=== Results ===
==== Final ====
Rank	Athlete	Nationality	#1	#2	#3	#4	#5	#6	Result	Points	Notes
1st place, gold medalist(s)	Nassima Saifi	Algeria	40.99	x	37.06	x	35.03	36.94	40.99	1040	WR
2nd place, silver medalist(s)	Stela Eneva	Bulgaria	32.96	39.84	36.89	34.80	37.80	38.42	39.84	1022	AR
3rd place, bronze medalist(s)	Nadia Medjmedj	Algeria	25.32	29.60	27.69	27.12	27.28	28.96	29.60	965	CR
4	Orla Barry	Ireland	28.95	28.87	27.14	28.92	27.99	27.25	28.95	947	
5	Catherine Callahan	United States	26.15	23.05	x	22.68	20.38	24.04	26.15	852	AR
6	Li Ling	China	21.96	21.68	25.99	24.38	22.22	25.60	25.99	846	SB
7	Angeles Ortiz Hernandez	Mexico	29.04	28.41	29.53	27.88	21.01	26.78	29.53	748	SB
8	Leilei Gao	China	27.57	28.94	x	26.18	22.57	28.41	28.94	725	
9	Ivanka Koleva	Bulgaria	21.44	20.76	21.98				21.98	659	
10	Mary Nakhumica	Kenya	19.46	21.94	20.51				21.94	657	
11	Siham Alrasheedy	United Arab Emirates	x	21.68	x				21.68	643	

Key: WR = World Record, AR = Area Record, CR = Championship Record, SB = Season Best

== See also ==
- List of IPC world records in athletics
