= 2013 IPC Athletics World Championships – Women's shot put =

The women's shot put at the 2013 IPC Athletics World Championships was held at the Stade du Rhône from 20–29 July.

== Medalists ==
| Class | Gold | Silver | Bronze |
|---|---|---|---|
| F11 | Assunta Legnante; Italy | Zhang Liangmin; China | Izabela Campos; Brazil |
| F12 | Marta Prokofyeva; Russia | Sofia Oksem; Russia | Tamara Sivakova; Belarus |
| F20 | Ewa Durska; Poland | Antonina Baranova; Russia | Anastasiia Mysnyk; Ukraine |
| F32/33/34 | Birgit Kober; Germany | Mounia Gasmi; Algeria | Maria Stamatoula; Greece |
| F35/36 | Mariia Pomazan; Ukraine | Wu Qing; China | Kath Proudfoot; Australia |
| F37 | Mi Na; China | Eva Berna; Czech Republic | Shirlene Coelho; Brazil |
| F42/44 | Jana Schmidt; Germany | Yao Juan; China | Sanela Redzic; Bosnia and Herzegovina |
| F52/53 | Cassie Mitchell; United States | Svitlana Stetsyuk; Ukraine | Pamela Lejean; Canada |
| F54 | Mariia Bogacheva; Russia | Yang Liwan; China | Hania Aidi; Tunisia |
| F55/56/57 | Martina Willing; Germany | Nadia Medjmedj; Algeria | Larisa Volik; Russia |
| F58 | Angeles Ortiz; Mexico | Stela Eneva; Bulgaria | Nassima Saifi; Algeria |

== See also ==
- List of IPC world records in athletics
