= 2014 IPC Athletics European Championships – Women's shot put =

The women's shot put at the 2014 IPC Athletics European Championships was held at the Swansea University Stadium from 18 to 23 August.

== Medalists ==
Event	Gold		Silver		Bronze	
F12	Assunta Legnante; Italy	16.84	Marta Prokofyeva; Russia	12.86	Sofia Oksem; Russia	12.45
F20	Anastasiia Mysnyk; Ukraine	12.73	Antonina Baranova; Russia	12.69	Svitlana Kudelya; Ukraine	12.25
F32/33	Svetlana Krivenok (F33); Russia	6.37; 912 pts	Maria Stamatoula (F32); Greece	5.62; 814 pts	Anthi Liagkou (F33); Greece	4.38; 377 pts
F34	Birgit Kober; Germany	8.60	Lucyna Kornobys; Poland	7.39	Frances Herrmann; Germany	6.61
F35/36	Mariia Pomazan (F35); Ukraine	11.93; 1045pts	Alla Malchyk (F36); Ukraine	9.29; 797pts	—	
F37	Eva Berná; Czech Republic	11.01 ER	Franziska Liebhardt; Germany	10.66	Irina Vertinskaya; Russia	10.49
F53/54/55	Maria Bogacheva (F54); Russia	7.04; 952pts	Svitlana Stetsyuk (F53); Ukraine	4.28; 903pts	Marianne Buggenhagen (F55); Germany	7.28; 824pts
F57	Stela Eneva (F57); Bulgaria	10.58	Ilke Wyludda (F57); Germany	10.46	Martina Willing (F56); Germany	7.46

== See also ==
- List of IPC world records in athletics
