= Sanela Redžić =

Bosnian disabled athlete

Personal information
- National team: Bosnia and Herzegovina

Sport
- Country: Bosnia and Herzegovina
- Sport: Shot put
- Disability class: F42
- Club: Athletic Disability Club Chelik
- Coached by: Elvir Krehmić
Medal record
Women's shot put
Representing Bosnia and Herzegovina
IPC Athletics European Championships
Bronze medal – third place	2012 Stadskanaal	F40/42/44
IPC Athletics World Championships
Bronze medal – third place	2013 Lyon	F42/44
- Updated on 14 November 2017

Sanela Redžić is a Bosnian disabled athlete who competes for her nation. She has won bronze medals at the IPC Athletics European and World Championships, and placed fourth in her event at the 2012 Summer Paralympics.

== Career ==
Sanela Redžić grew up in Tešanj, Bosnia and Herzegovina, during the Bosnian War. Following the war, she started taking part in competitive shooting, become the local champion in her first year. Redžić started taking part in discus, javelin throw and shot put for recreation in 2005, only taking part competitively from 2010 onwards. She trains at Athletic Disability Club Chelik, although without full funding and initially without a proper sport prosthesis. She competes in the F42 disability class.

Redžić met the required standard to compete at the 2012 Summer Paralympics in London, England. A few months prior to the Games, she took part in the IPC Athletics European Championships in Stadskanaal, Netherlands in the F40/42/44 shot put. She won the gold medal behind Poland's Darija Kabeš and Germany's Anet Jelita. Redžić was the only individual athlete in the Bosnia and Herzegovina team for the 2012 Summer Paralympics, alongside their volleyball team. In the F42/44 shot put, Redžić set a new national record with her first throw. However, her successful throws were not as far, and she finished in fourth place outside of the medal positions.

She was one of two Bosnian athletes to travel to the 2013 IPC Athletics World Championships in Lyon, France. Redžić competed in the women's shot put, where she won the bronze medal in the F42/44 disability class. Her throw of 8.81 metres (28.9 ft) was a new national record. She hoped that this medal would lead to proper sports equipment for her to use, and was looking forward to compete at the 2016 Summer Paralympics in Rio de Janeiro, Brazil. She was named the best athlete in Bosnia and Herzegovina in 2013, due to her performance at the previous year's World Championships. Redžić had surgery on her leg in 2014, following a bone growth which was causing difficulties for her to compete.
