= Anastasiia Mysnyk =

Ukrainian Paralympic athlete (born 1991)

Ewa Durska
Personal information
- Nationality: Ukrainian
- Born: 19 February 1991 (age 35) Znamianka, Ukraine

Sport
- Sport: track and field
- Disability: Intellectual impairment
- Disability class: F20
- Event: shot put
- Club: Invasport: Kropyvnytskyi
- Coached by: Oleg Sokolovsky
Medal record
Paralympic athletics
Representing Ukraine
Paralympic Games
Silver medal – second place	2012 London	Shot put F20
Silver medal – second place	2020 Tokyo	Shot put F20
IPC World Championships
Bronze medal – third place	2013 Lyon	Shot put F20
Bronze medal – third place	2015 Doha	Shot put F20
IPC Athletics European Championships
Gold medal – first place	2014 Swansea	Shot put F20
Bronze medal – third place	2012 Stadskanaal	Shot put F20

Anastasiia Mysnyk (born 19 February 1991) is a Paralympian athlete from Ukraine competing mainly in category F20 shot put events. She won the silver medal in her event at the 2012 Summer Paralympics in London. As well as Paralympic success she has won medals at both World and European level.
