= Athletics at the 2008 Summer Paralympics – Women's shot put F42–46 =

Women's Shot Put F42-46 at the XIII Paralympic Games
- Venue: Beijing National Stadium
- Dates: 9 September
- Competitors: 9 from 6 nations
- Winning distance: 10.06

Medalists
1st place, gold medalist(s)		Zheng Baozhu	China
2nd place, silver medalist(s)		Zhong Yongyuan	China
3rd place, bronze medalist(s)		Michaela Floeth	Germany

The women's shot put F42-46 event at the 2008 Summer Paralympics took place at the Beijing National Stadium at 18:10 on 9 September. There was a single round of competition; after the first three throws, only the top eight had 3 further throws. The competition was won by Zheng Baozhu, representing China.

== Results ==
Rank	Athlete	Nationality	Cl.	1	2	3	4	5	6	Best	Pts.	Notes
1st place, gold medalist(s)	Zheng Baozhu	China	F42	9.55	9.98	9.71	x	9.93	10.06	10.06	1078	WR
2nd place, silver medalist(s)	Zhong Yongyuan	China	F42	9.53	9.70	x	9.80	x	x	9.80	1051	
3rd place, bronze medalist(s)	Michaela Floeth	Germany	F44	11.10	11.53	12.14	12.32	12.58	12.22	12.58	1034	WR
4	Jin Yajuan	China	F44	x	11.86	11.41	11.48	11.81	12.14	12.14	998	
5	Jana Schmidt	Germany	F42	7.89	8.73	8.70	8.76	9.01	8.83	9.01	966	
6	Perla Bustamante	Mexico	F42	8.70	7.89	153.00	851.00	869.00	874.00	9.07	8.7	933
7	Jelena Vukovic	Croatia	F42	8.27	7.69	8.22	8.31	8.04	7.86	8.31	891	
8	Nikoletta Pavlidou	Greece	F46	9.79	9.78	9.62	9.76	8.88	9.74	9.79	805	
9	Artimiza Sequeira	Cape Verde	F42	5.61	5.57	5.08	-	-	-	5.61	601	

WR = World Record.
