= Birgit Kober =

German Paralympic athlete

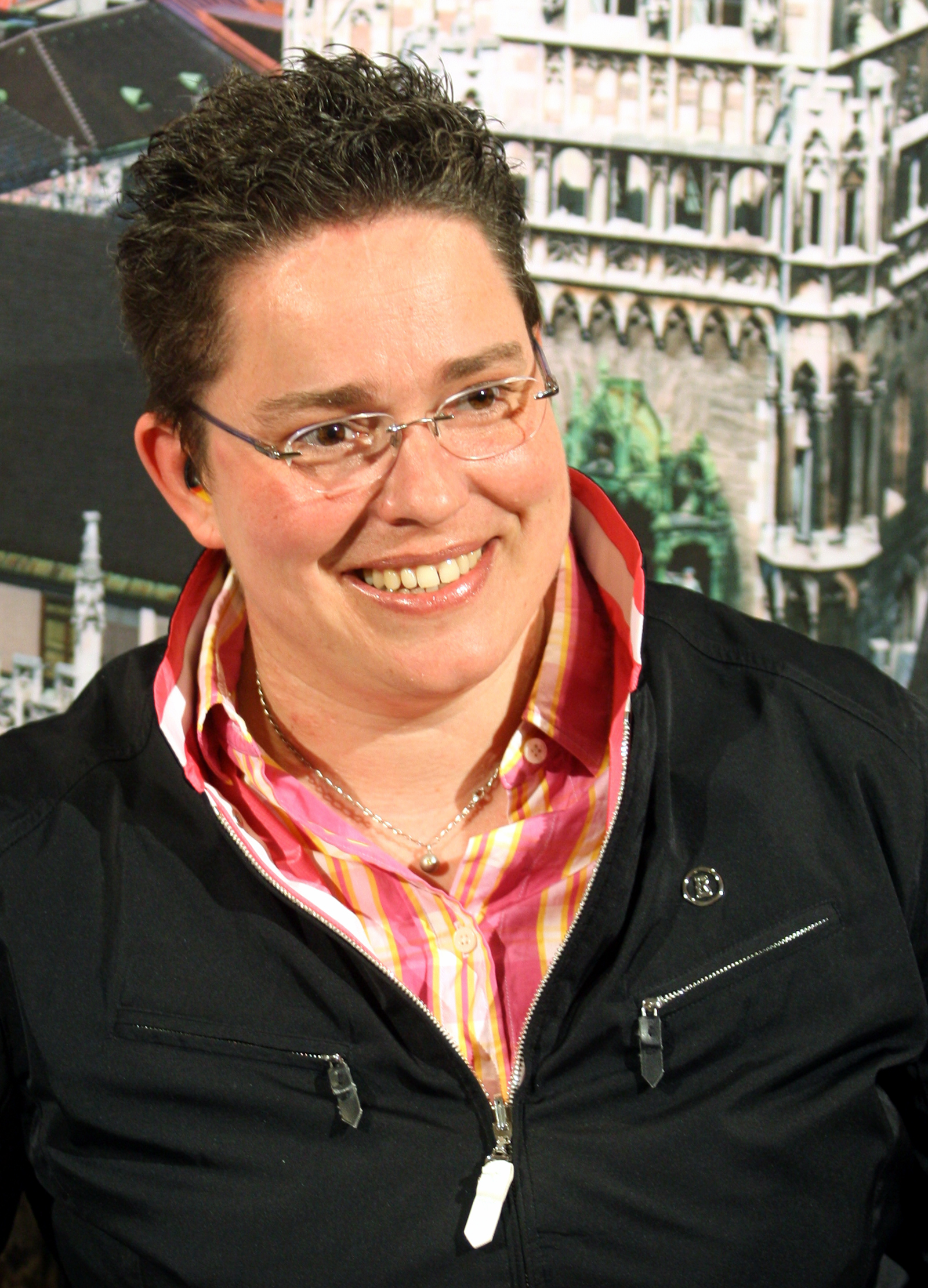
- Kober in April 2013.

Personal information
- Nationality: German
- Born: 10 July 1971 (age 54) Munich, West Germany
- Website: www.birgitkober.de

Sport
- Sport: Track and field
- Disability: Ataxia
- Event(s): shot put Javelin throw
- Club: TSV Bayer 04 Leverkusen
- Coached by: Joachim Lipske
Medal record
Women's para athletics
Representing Germany
Event	1st	2nd	3rd
Paralympic Games	3	0	0
World Championships	4	0	0
European Championships	5	0	0
Paralympic Games
Gold medal – first place	2012 London	Shot put F33/34
Gold medal – first place	2012 London	Javelin – F33/34/52/53
Gold medal – first place	2016 Rio de Janeiro	Shot put – F36
IPC World Championships
Gold medal – first place	2011 Christchurch	Shot put – F33/34
Gold medal – first place	2011 Christchurch	Javelin F33/34/52/53
Gold medal – first place	2013 Lyon	Shot put – F32/33/34
Gold medal – first place	2013 Lyon	Javelin F33/34
IPC European Championships
Gold medal – first place	2012 Stadskanaal	Shot put – F34
Gold medal – first place	2012 Stadskanaal	Javelin F33/34/52/53
Gold medal – first place	2014 Swansea	Javelin F34
Gold medal – first place	2014 Swansea	shot put F34
Gold medal – first place	2016 Grosseto	shot put F35/36

Birgit Kober (born 10 July 1971) is a German Paralympic athlete. She initially competed in F34 seated throwing events, and from 2011 to 2013 she became the reigning champion at European, World and Paralympic level in both shot put and javelin in her class. At the 2012 Summer Paralympic Games in London, she broke the world record in both her events. Following changes to the IPC rules for seated throws in 2014, she chose to compete in a standing position as an F36 athlete. She won the F36 shot put at the 2016 Summer Paralympic Games with a Paralympic record throw. As of April 2017 she is World Record holder in the Women's F36 shot put, a distance of 11.52 m set in July 2016.

== Career history ==
=== Early history ===
Kober was born in 1971 and grew up in Munich. She took to sport at a young age, and by 14 she was involved in athletics and the javelin throw while at school in Munich. At the age of 16 a reaction with medical treatment left her deaf, and a year later she suffered an epileptic seizure. While still a teenager she moved to the Ruhr region where she attended a school for the deaf. She continued her education, specializing in medicine but was forced to cut her studies in 2006 to help care for her sick mother. In 2007 Kober suffered from a status epilepticus and she was rushed to hospital, but after complications she was left with ataxia.

=== Athletics career ===
Kober returned to athletics in 2008, mainly as a form of enjoyment with no serious ambitions to take the sport further. She joined TSV Bayer 04 Leverkusen where she was coached by Joachim Lipske. Kober was quickly identified as a potential talent in throwing events and by 2009 she was competing in national competitions. Classified as a T/F34 category para-athlete, Kober specialized in both the javelin and shot put. She qualified for the 2011 IPC Athletics World Championships in Christchurch, New Zealand, and took gold in both her events. In the shot put, where she competed in a mixed F32/33/34 grouping, she threw a distance of 9.30m, a new world record.

In 2012, in the build-up to the Summer Paralympics in London, she entered the European Championships in Stadskanaal in the Netherlands. She again dominated the field taking both gold medals and recording a world record in the shot put with a throw of 10.06m. At the Paralympics she recorded a distance of 27.03m in the javelin and three days later she threw 10.25m in the shot put. Both distances were new world records in the F34 classification and gave her gold in both events.

Kober defended her World titles when she travelled to Lyon for the 2013 World Championships. She took both the javelin throw (F33/34) and shot put titles, equaling her world record throw in the javelin.
