= Xu Qiuping =

Chinese Paralympic athlete

Personal information
- Born: 29 August 1984 (age 41) Shanghai, China
- Height: 174 cm (69 in)

Sport
- Country: China
- Sport: Athletics
- Disability class: F37
- Event(s): shot put discus throw javelin throw
- Club: Shanghai
- Coached by: Wang Xingzhang
Medal record
Track and field
Representing China
Paralympic Games
Silver medal – second place	2012 London	Shot put – F37
Silver medal – second place	2012 London	Discus – F37
World Championships
Silver medal – second place	2011 Christchurch	shot put – F37
Bronze medal – third place	2011 Christchurch	discus – F37
Asian Para Games
Bronze medal – third place	2010 Guangzhou	Discus – F37
Bronze medal – third place	2010 Guangzhou	Javelin – F37
Bronze medal – third place	2010 Guangzhou	Shot put – F37

Xu Qiuping (born 29 August 1984) is a Paralympian athlete from China competing mainly in F37 classification throwing events.

Xu first represented her country at a Paralympic Games in 2008 in Beijing, entering the F37/38 shot put event. Her best throw of 10.21 left her in sixth place, outside the medals. She experienced greater success at the 2012 Summer Paralympics in London, where she won two medals; both silver in the F37 discus and shot put. As well as her Paralympic success Xu has won medals at the World Championships winning a silver and bronze in the 2011 Games in Christchurch.

== Personal history ==
Xu was born in Shanghai, China in 1984. Due to damage to nerves in her brain, Xu is unable to move her right hand. She still lives is Shanghai and is a professional athlete.
