= Deepa Malik =

Indian paralympic swimmer, biker, and athlete (born 1970)

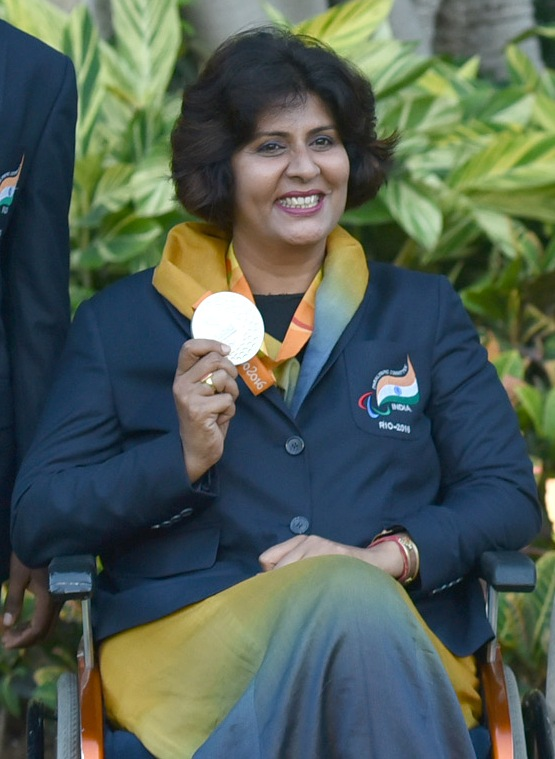
- Malik in 2016

Personal information
- Full name: Deepa Malik
- Born: 30 September 1970 (age 55) Bhainswal, Haryana, India

President of Paralympic Committee of India
- In office 1 February 2020 – 8 March 2024
- Preceded by: Gursharan Singh (Acting President)
- Succeeded by: Devendra Jhajharia

Sport
- Country: India
- Events: Shot Put, Javelin throw, Discus Throw, Swimming & Motorcycling

Achievements and titles
- Paralympic finals: 2016 Rio de Janeiro
Medal record
Representing India
Women's athletics
Paralympic Games
Silver medal – second place	2016 Rio de Janeiro	Shot put – F53
IPC World Championships
Silver medal – second place	2011 Christchurch	Shot put – F52-53
Asian Para Games
Bronze medal – third place	2010 Guangzhou	Javelin throw – F33-34-52-53
Silver medal – second place	2014 Incheon	Javelin throw -F53-54
Bronze medal – third place	2018 Jakarta	Discus throw – F51/52/53
Bronze medal – third place	2018 Jakarta	Javelin Throw – F53-54

Deepa Malik (born 30 September 1970) is an Indian para athlete from Haryana. She won a silver medal at the 2016 Summer Paralympics in shot put, becoming the first Indian woman to win a medal in the Paralympic Games.

In 2020, she was elected as President of the Paralympic Committee of India.

== Early life ==
Malik was born to Veena Nagpal and Bal Krishan Nagpal in 1970. Her father was in the Indian Army. Her brother, Vikram Nagpal, is a brigadier in the Indian Army. Her elder daughter, Devika, is studying sports psychology. At 5, she was diagnosed with a spinal tumor for which she underwent three years of treatment. The treatment was successful but Malik required aggressive physiotherapy to recover.

In 1999 at age 29, Malik was again diagnosed with spinal tumor. She underwent three surgeries to successfully remove the tumor but the surgeries left her paralyzed from the waist down. Afterwards, she again underwent physiotherapy for six years. After recovering, Malik began to develop an interest in sports. She became a swimmer and a biker, and soon afterwards swam across the River Yamuna.

== Sports career ==
Malik started her sports career at the age of 30 in 2000. She qualified B level in javelin throw F53 category for 2008 Summer Olympics at Beijing. In 2006, she came second in the FESPIC Games, Kuala Lumpur in S5 swimming backstroke category. In 2008, she represented India in the World Open Swimming Championship at Berlin and finished 10th in S5 swimming backstroke event. In 2009, she won a shot put bronze medal at IWAS World Games.

In January 2011, she won a silver medal at the IPC World Athletics Championship in Christchurch. At the same event, she qualified for the Commonwealth Games in shot put. In December 2011, she won two bronze medals with Asian records at the IWAS World Games at Sharjah. In April 2012, she won two gold medals at the first Malaysian Open Athletics Championship in Javelin and discus throw F53 category. In 2013, she qualified for the IPC World Athletics Championship at Lyon 2013 at the German Open Athletics Championship, Berlin 2013. In April 2014, she won a gold in the shot put F53-55 category at the IPC 2nd China Open Athletics Championship at Beijing. In 2015, she got a 5th place in the IPC Athletics World Championship, Doha, Qatar in shot put, diploma 5th position. In March 2016, she won a gold in javelin and silver in shot put at the IPC Oceania Asian Championship, Dubai, United Arab Emirates. In 2018, she won a gold in the F-53/54 javelin event at the Para Athletic Grand Prix held in Dubai.

=== Asian Para Games ===
She won the first medal by an Indian woman winning a bronze at Para-Asian Games at China in December 2010. She is the only Indian woman to win medals in three consecutive Asian Para Games in 2010, 2014 and 2018.

In 2014, she won a silver medal at the Incheon Asian Para Games 2014 in the women's 53–54 javelin with a new Asian Record. She also qualified for the IPC World Athletics Championship to be held at Doha in October 2015.

In 2018, she won two bronze medals in the Asian Para Games at Jakarta. She won a bronze in the F53/F54 category javelin throw and another bronze in F51/52/53 category discus throw.

=== Paralympic Games ===
In the 2016 Summer Paralympics at Rio, she won a silver medal in shot put and became the first woman to win a Paralympic medal for India.

== Motorsports ==
Deepa Malik was one of the first persons to receive a license for an invalid (modified) rally vehicle, a case she consistently pursued for 19 months in Maharashtra. She is also the first physically challenged individual in the country to receive an official rally license from the Federation of Motor Sports Club of India (FMSCI) and become a navigator and driver in the toughest car rallies of the country- Raid-de-HIMALAYA 2009 and Desert Storm 2010.

She undertook an 8-day, 1,700-km drive in sub-zero temperatures which included a climb to 18,000 feet (5,500 m) in the Raid De Himalaya event that went through remote Himalayas, Leh, Shimla and Jammu.

Malik participated in the grid and national anthem ceremony at the start of the 2013 Indian Grand Prix at the Buddh International Circuit.

== Personal life ==
Malik is married to Bikram Singh Malik, who proposed to her with a bike rather than a ring. They bonded over a mutual love of sports. "I had fallen in love with Bikram because he was a biker," said Malik of their relationship. Malik is a former colonel in the Indian Army. Together, they have two daughters.

In 2003, while her husband was away on tour, she opened a restaurant in Ahmednagar where she employed underprivileged youths and took care that they return to their education. The restaurant continued operations until its closure in 2010.

== Awards and recognition ==
=== National awards ===
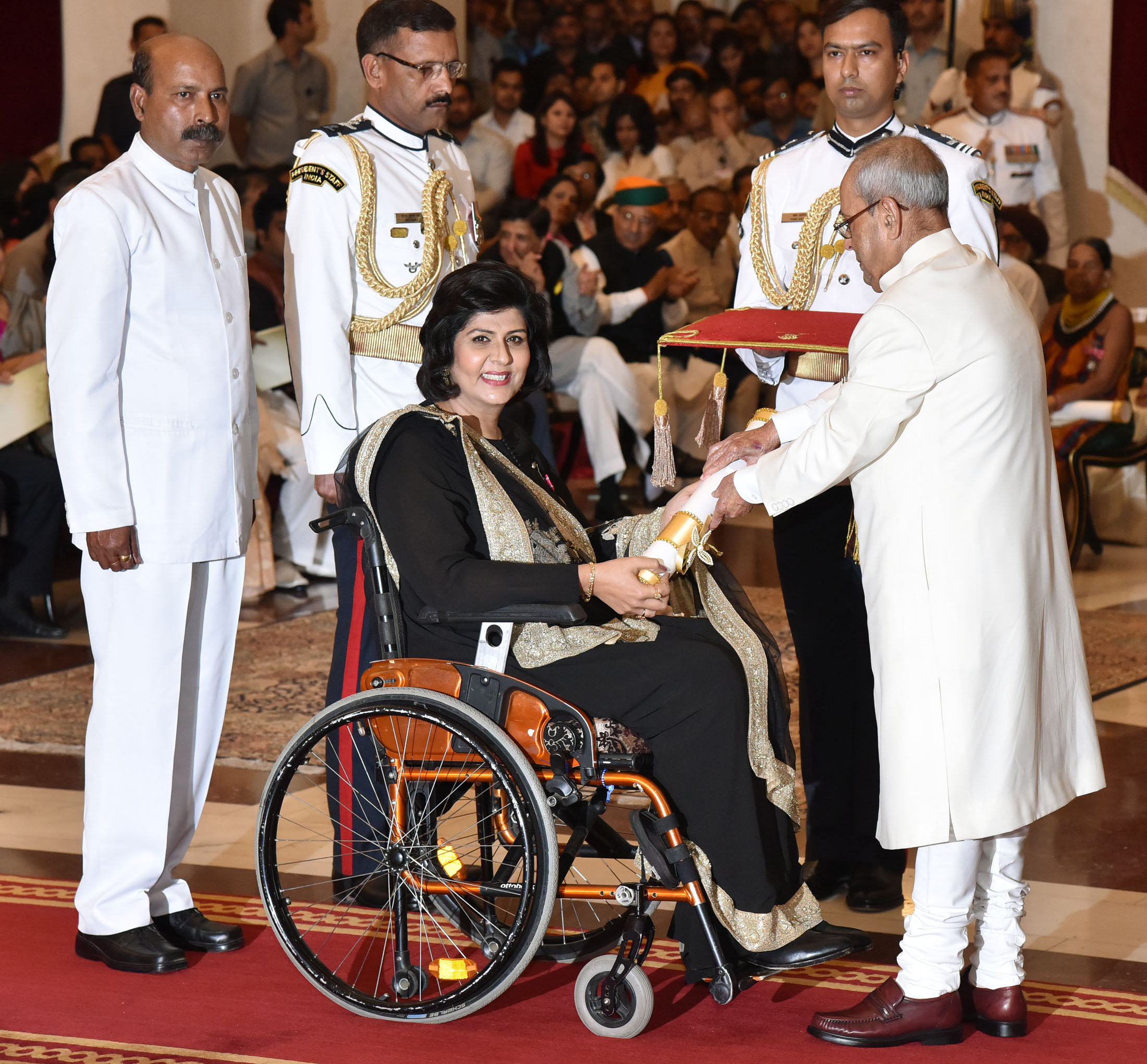
The President, Shri Pranab Mukherjee presenting the Padma Shri Award to Ms. Deepa Malik, at a Civil Investiture Ceremony, at Rashtrapati Bhavan, in New Delhi on March 30, 2017

- President Role Model Award (2014)
- Arjuna Award in 2012 at the age of 42 years.
- Maharashtra Chhatrapati Award (sports) (2009–10)
- Haryana Karambhoomi Award (2008)
- Swawlamban Puruskar Maharashtra (2006)
- Padma Shri Award (2017)
- First Ladies Award - Ministry of Women & Child Development.
- Major Dhyan Chand Khel Ratna Award (2019)

=== Other awards ===
- The Wise Owl Literary Award 2026 (1st Runner Up)for her book Bring It On.
- WCRC Leaders Asia Excellence Award 2014
- Limca people of the year award 2014
- iCONGO Karamveer Puruskar 2014
- Amazing Indian Awards Times Now-2013
- Cavinkare National Ability Mastery Award −2013
- Karamaveer Chakra award 2013
- Nominee for L'Oreal Femina Awards 2013 in “Women We Love Category”
- Batra Positive Health Hero Award 2012
- AWWA Excellence Award For Sports 2012
- Media Peace & Excellence Award For Sports 2012
- Maharana Mewar Arawali Sports Award 2012
- Misaal-e-Himmat Award (2012)
- International Women's day appreciation Award 2011 – Cancer Patient Aid Association New Delhi.
- Shree Shakti Puruskar CARE- 2011
- District Sports Award Ahmednagar-2010
- Rashtra Gaurav Puraskar 2009
- Naari Gaurav Puraskar 2009
- Guru Gobind Shaurya Puraskar 2009
- Rotary Women Of The Year Award 2007

For the silver medal at the 2016 Summer Paralympics

- ₹4 crore (US$420,000) from the Government of Haryana
- ₹50 lakh (US$52,000) from the Ministry of Youth Affairs and Sports

== Records and rankings ==
- Holds An Official IPC Asian Record In Javelin F-53 Category – Felicitated by Milkha Singh and P.T.Usha.
- Holds All Three National Records In Throws {Discus, Javelin, Shot-put} In F-53 Category
- Holds All Three National Records In S-1 Swimming Category {Back Stroke, Breast Stroke, Free Style }
- World Ranking 2010–12 – 2nd Shot-put, 3rd -Discus, 3rd Javelin
- Asian Ranking 2010–12 – 1st In All Three Throws

LIMCA World Records

- Longest Pan-India drive done by a paraplegic women. Chennai-Delhi 3278 km – 2013
- Driving Across Nine High Altitude Passes in Nine Days on Leh-Ladakh Highest Motorable Roads. (First Woman in the world in her disability to attempt a journey like this – 2011)
- Riding Special Bike −2009
- Swimming in River Yamuna Against The Current For 1 km. Allahabad-2008

== Public appearances ==
- 11 October 2019, On the occasion of International Day of the Girl Child, Deepa appeared on the popular Indian TV game show Kaun Banega Crorepati.

== Political career ==
Deepa Malik joined the BJP shortly before the 2019 general election. She is a member of the working group in the formulation 12th five-year plan (2012–2017) on sports and physical education as nominated by the Planning Commission HRD Division on behalf of the Sports Ministry.

== See also ==
- Athletics at the 2010 Commonwealth Games – Women's shot put (F32–34/52/53)
- 2011 IPC Athletics World Championships – Women's discus throw
- Athletics at the 2010 Asian Para Games
- 2011 IPC Athletics World Championships – Women's javelin throw
- 2011 IPC Athletics World Championships – Women's shot put
