= Svitlana Kudelya =

Ukrainian Paralympic athlete (born 1992)

Personal information
- Nationality: Ukrainian
- Born: 22 January 1992 (age 34) Mykolaiv, Ukraine

Sport
- Sport: track and field
- Disability: Intellectual impairment
- Disability class: T20
- Event: shot put
- Coached by: Irina Slyusar
Medal record
Paralympic athletics
Representing Ukraine
Paralympic Games
Bronze medal – third place	2012 London	shot put – T20
IPC World Championships
Silver medal – second place	2011 Christchurch	shot put – T20
IPC Athletics European Championships
Gold medal – first place	2012 Stadskanaal	Shot put – T20
Bronze medal – third place	2014 Swansea	Shot put – T20

Svitlava Kudelya (born 22 January 1992) is a Paralympian athlete from Ukraine competing mainly in category T20 shot put events. She won the bronze medal in her event at the 2012 Summer Paralympics in London. As well as Paralympic success she has won medals at both World and European level.
