= Michaela Floeth =

German Paralympic athlete

Personal information
- Born: 5 April 1969 (age 57)

Sport
- Disability: Limb deficiency
- Disability class: F44
Medal record
Women's para-athletics
Representing Germany
World Championships
Gold medal – first place	2011 Christchurch	Shot put F42/44/46
Paralympic Games
Bronze medal – third place	2008 Beijing	Shot put F42–46
Bronze medal – third place	2012 London	Shot put F42–44

Michaela Floeth (born 5 April 1969) is a former para-athlete from Germany who competed predominantly in F44 category shot put events.

At the 2008 Summer Paralympics in Beijing, China, she won a bronze medal in the Women's shot put F42–46 event. She also finished fourth in the women's discus throw F42-46 event.

Floeth won a gold medal at the 2011 IPC Athletics World Championships in the Women's shot put F42/44/46 event.

At the 2012 Summer Paralympics, she won a bronze medal in the women's shot put F42–44 event.
