= Athletics at the 2008 Summer Paralympics – Women's shot put F54–56 =

Women's Shot Put F54-56 at the XIII Paralympic Games
- Venue: Beijing National Stadium
- Dates: 8 September
- Competitors: 15 from 12 nations
- Winning distance: 6.73

Medalists
1st place, gold medalist(s)		Eva Kacanu	Czech Republic
2nd place, silver medalist(s)		Martina Monika Willing	Germany
3rd place, bronze medalist(s)		Marianne Buggenhagen	Germany

The women's shot put F54-56 event at the 2008 Summer Paralympics took place at the Beijing National Stadium at 09:05 on 8 September. There was a single round of competition; after the first three throws, only the top eight had 3 further throws. The competition was won by Eva Kacanu, representing Czech Republic.

== Results ==
Rank	Athlete	Nationality	Cl.	1	2	3	4	5	6	Best	Pts.	Notes
1st place, gold medalist(s)	Eva Kacanu	Czech Republic	F54	6.59	6.53	6.45	6.24	6.17	6.73	6.73	1084	WR
2nd place, silver medalist(s)	Martina Monika Willing	Germany	F56	8.50	8.61	8.41	8.24	7.98	8.54	8.61	1034	WR
3rd place, bronze medalist(s)	Marianne Buggenhagen	Germany	F55	8.44	8.39	8.22	8.47	8.25	8.54	8.54	1026	SB
4	Hania Aidi	Tunisia	F54	6.31	6.11	6.24	5.71	6.19	6.12	6.31	1016	SB
5	Tatjana Majcen Ljubic	Slovenia	F54	6.27	6.00	6.01	6.24	5.87	6.10	6.27	1010	
6	Irena Perminiene	Lithuania	F54	5.48	5.97	5.94	5.59	5.67	5.59	5.97	962	SB
7	Yang Liwan	China	F55	7.84	6.01	7.94	7.36	7.69	7.73	7.94	954	SB
8	Jenni Bryce	Australia	F56	7.46	7.85	7.78	7.10	7.72	7.65	7.85	943	SB
9	Azucena Saucedo	Mexico	F56	7.31	7.34	7.56	-	-	-	7.56	908	SB
10	Chen Liping	China	F54	5.51	5.58	5.54	-	-	-	5.58	899	
11	Dzenita Klico	Bosnia and Herzegovina	F54	5.21	5.39	5.25	-	-	-	5.39	868	SB
12	Zanele Situ	South Africa	F54	4.91	5.07	4.83	-	-	-	5.07	817	
13	Suely Guimaraes	Brazil	F56	6.39	6.68	6.56	-	-	-	6.68	803	SB
14	Dong Feixia	China	F55	5.41	6.29	5.93	-	-	-	6.29	756	
15	Milka Milinkovic	Croatia	F55	5.61	5.84	5.84	-	-	-	5.84	702	

WR = World Record. SB = Seasonal Best.
