= Ewa Durska =

Polish Paralympic athlete

Personal information
- Nationality: Polish
- Born: 27 February 1977 (age 49) Nowogard, Poland

Sport
- Sport: track and field
- Disability: Intellectual impairment
- Disability class: T20
- Event: shot put
- Club: UKS Barnim Goleniow
- Coached by: Waldemar Nowotny
Medal record
Women's para-athletics
Representing Poland
Paralympic Games
Gold medal – first place	2000 Sydney	Shot put – T20
Gold medal – first place	2012 London	Shot put – T20
IPC World Championships
Gold medal – first place	1998 Birmingham	Shot put – T20
Gold medal – first place	2011 Christchurch	Shot put – T20
Gold medal – first place	2013 Lyon	Shot put – T20
Gold medal – first place	2015 Doha	Shot put – T20
IPC European Championships
Gold medal – first place	2016 Grosseto	Shot put – T20
Silver medal – second place	2012 Stadskanaal	Shot put – T20

Ewa Durska (born 27 February 1977) is a Paralympian athlete from Poland competing mainly in category T20 shot put events. She is a two time Paralympic gold medalist in the shot put at the 2000 Games in Sydney and the 2012 Games in London. Her Paralympic career was put on hold after a sporting controversy at the 2000 Games saw her classification removed for the next two cycle of Paralympic Games. Durska is a four time World Championship gold medalist.
