= Ruth Aguilar =

Spanish Paralympic athletics competitor

Personal information
- Full name: Ruth Aguilar Fulgencio
- Nationality: Spanish
- Born: 3 February 1975 (age 51) Torrent, Valencia
- Website: RuthAguilar.es

Sport
- Country: Spain
- Sport: Athletics

Ruth Aguilar Fulgencio (Note: In this Spanish name, the first or paternal surname is Aguilar and the second or maternal family name is Fulgencio.) (born 3 February 1975) is a Spanish Paralympic athletics competitor who has represented Spain at the 2012 Summer Paralympics. She played for Spain's national U-17 handball team before suffering a fractured spine in a car accident.

== Personal ==
Aguilar was born on 3 February 1975 in Torrent, Valencia, and attended Colegio Público Miguel Hernández. Before fracturing her spine in a car accident in December 1992, she played handball. She represented Spain internationally in handball at the under 17 level. She played club handball as a goalball for Urbana Valencia. As an athlete with a disability, sports she initially tried included swimming, wheelchair basketball and powerlifting.

Aguilar took a break from competitive sport at one point to give birth to her son. Her break from sport was extended after her father got lung cancer and she tended to him until he died from the disease. In 2013, she was getting a disability pension. In February 2013, local police in Alfafar organized a talk about driver education, and Aguilar participated in the talk as a speaker because of the impact a traffic accident had in her life. While at the event, she also signed the city's Book of Honor. In November 2013, she was given an award at the fifth edition of the Carta de Poblament awards. She won in the category of arts, letters and sports. In November 2013, she participated in a program run by the Programa ADOP Empleo to train Paralympic athletes in developing business communication and entrepreneurship skills.

== Athletics ==
Aguilar competes in athletics using a wheelchair.

The 2011 Spanish National Adaptive Athletics Championships were held in Valencia and Aguilar competed in them. Competing at the 2010 IPC European Championships, she finished third in the sho tput. Aguilar competed at the 2012 Summer Paralympics in athletics. In 2013, she was working on qualifying for the 2016 Summer Paralympics in the javelin, discus and shot put. In March 2013, she participated in a dualathlon event as part of a relay team, with Jesus Cordero Ballesteros her teammate.
