= Nassima Saifi =

Algerian Paralympic athlete (born 1988)

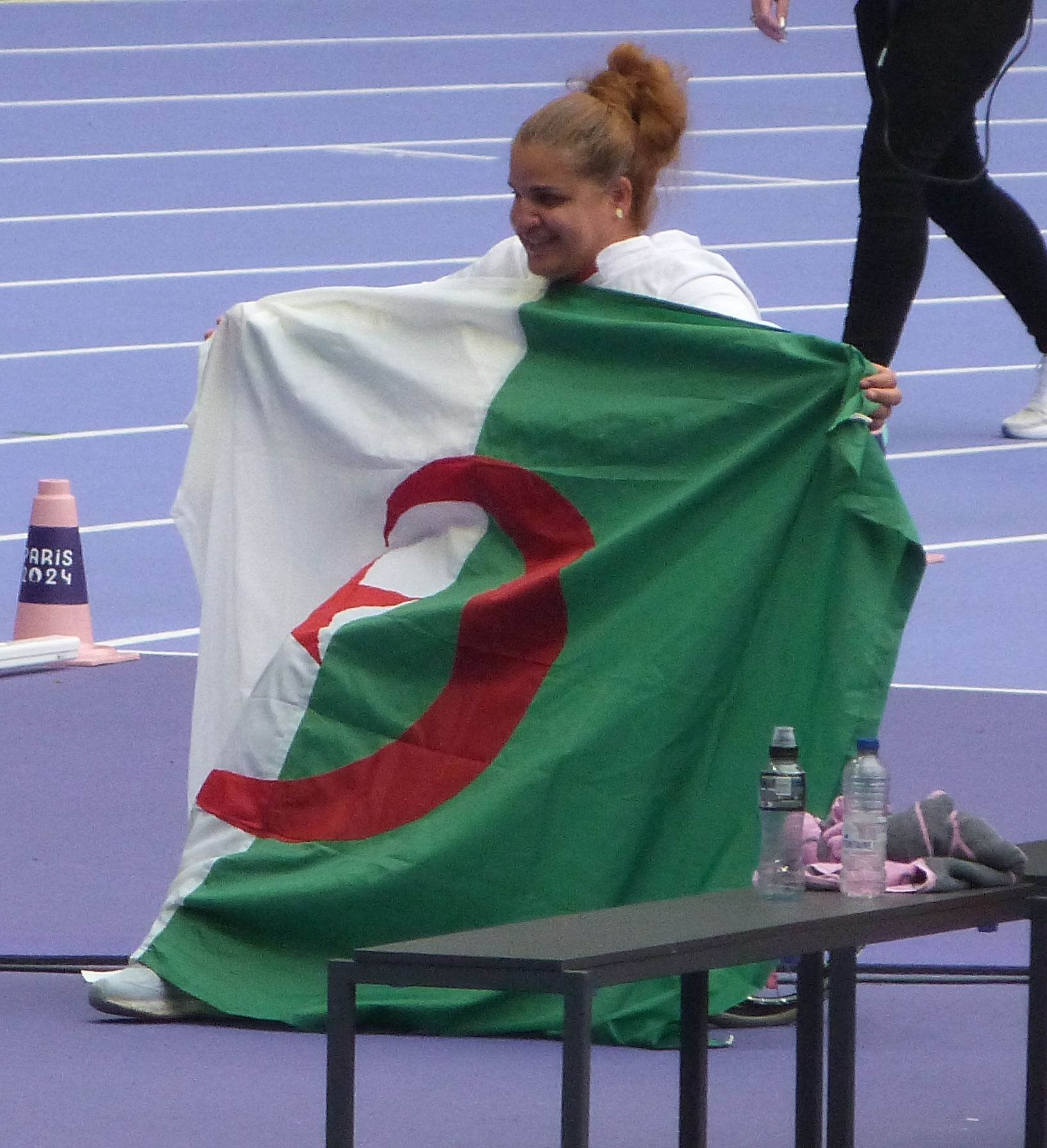

Personal information
- Nationality: Algerian
- Born: 29 October 1988 (age 37) Mila, Algeria
- Height: 180 cm (71 in)

Sport
- Country: Algeria
- Sport: Athletics (track)
- Disability: Limb deficiency
- Disability class: F58
- Club: GSP Alger
- Coached by: Hocine Saadoune
Medal record
Women's para athletics
Representing Algeria
Paralympic Games
Gold medal – first place	2012 London	Discus – T57/58
Gold medal – first place	2016 Rio de Janeiro	Discus – T56/57
Gold medal – first place	2024 Paris	Discus throw F56/57
Silver medal – second place	2016 Rio de Janeiro	Shot put – F56/F57
Silver medal – second place	2020 Tokyo	Discus throw F56/57
Bronze medal – third place	2024 Paris	Shot put F55/56/57
World Championships
Gold medal – first place	2011 Christchurch	Discus – T57/58
Gold medal – first place	2013 Lyon	Discus – T57/58
Gold medal – first place	2015 Doha	Discus – T57
Gold medal – first place	2023 Paris	Discus – F57
Gold medal – first place	2025 New Delhi	Discus – F57
Silver medal – second place	2025 New Delhi	Shot put – F57
Bronze medal – third place	2013 Lyon	Shot put – F58
Bronze medal – third place	2024 Kobe	Shot put – F57
Pan Arab Games
Gold medal – first place	2011 Doha	Discus throw – F57/58
Bronze medal – third place	2011 Doha	Shot put – F57/58

Nassima Saifi (/nɑːˈsɪmɑː saɪfiː/; born 29 October 1988) is a Paralympian athlete from Algeria competing mainly in category F58 throwing events. Specialising in both the discus throw and shot put, Saifi is a double Paralympic gold medal winner and three time World Champion.

== Personal history ==
Saifi was born in Mila, Algeria in 1988. Born able-bodied, she had her left leg amputated following after being hit by a car in 1998. Her father, realizing she needed something to work on in her spare time, encouraged her to take up an athletics career. She joined the Mila handisport club where she was able to train.

== Athletic career ==
Thanks to her father's assistance and encouragement, Saifi made her international debut for Algeria at the 2006 IPC Athletics World Championships in Assen. She entered both the shot put and discus throw, finishing fifth in both. Saifi made her first appearance at a Summer Paralympics in the 2008 Games in Beijing. She entered both the shot put and discus throw, finishing tenth and fourth respectively.

Saifi's first major international success came at the 2011 IPC Athletics World Championships in Christchurch, where she entered both the discus throw and the shot put. Although finishing ninth in the shot, she threw a distance of 40.99 metres to win the gold medal, an improvement of over six metres on her Beijing best. The following year she appeared at the 2012 Paralympics in London, winning gold in the discus and making her the joint World and Paralympic champion.

At the 2013 IPC World Championships in Lyon Saifi not only retained her discus title, but also won a bronze in the shot put, her first medal in the event at world level. The discus event was a close affair with Saifi requiring a world record throw of 42.05 metres to record a higher points tally over Ireland's Orla Barry. Two years later in Doha, Saifi claimed her third consecutive World discus title in her class.

In preparation for the Paralympics, she was trained by Hocine Saadoun for three hours a day, every day, except for weekends. Saifi cemented her position as one of the greatest Paralympic competitors at the 2016 Summer Paralympics in Rio. Despite throwing well below her best (her winning throw being 33.33 metres) she was still able to take the gold medal, making her unbeaten at world and Paralympic level since 2011. She also took silver in her less favoured shot put, her first at a Paralympics.
