= Nadia Medjmedj =

Algerian Paralympic athlete

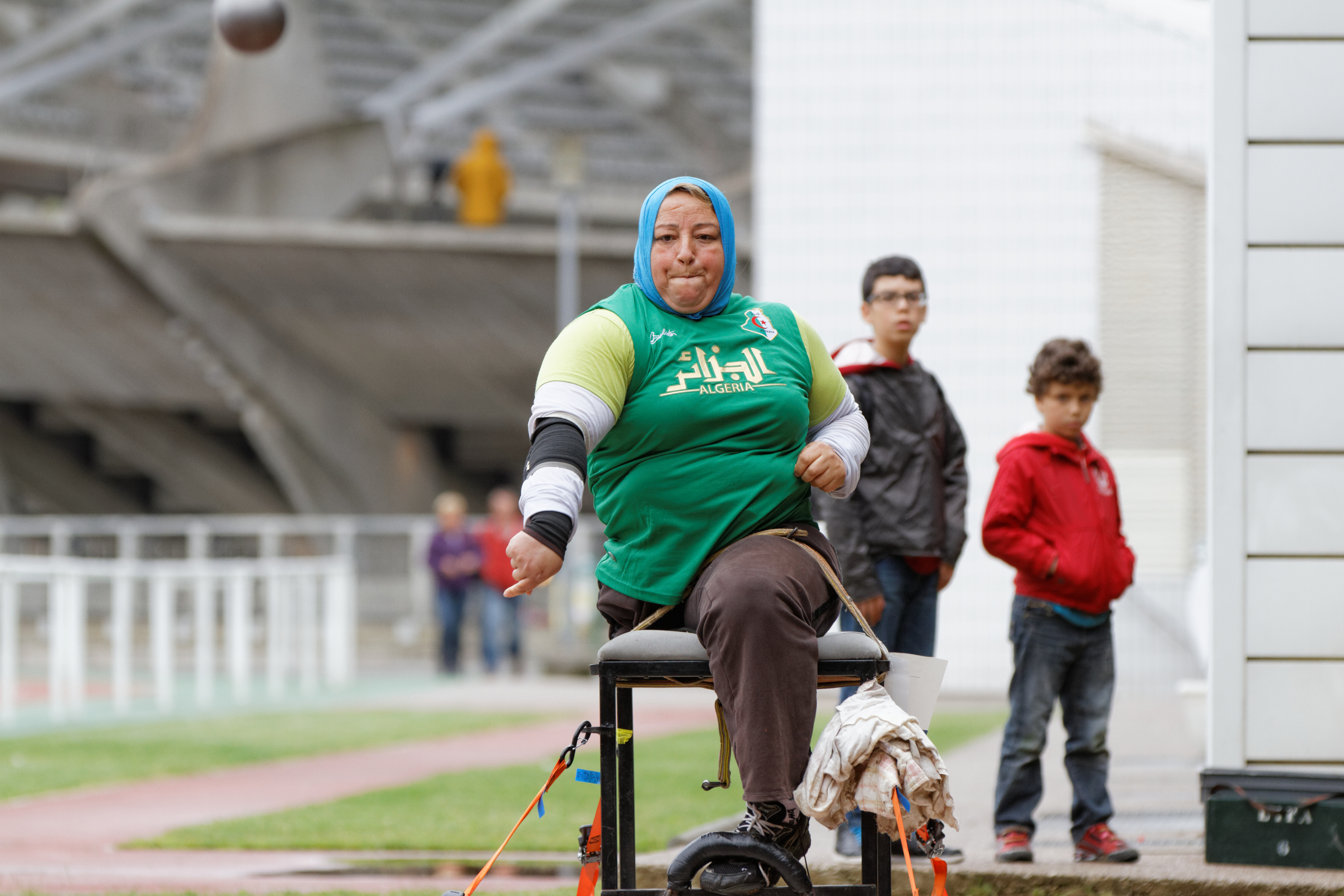

Personal information
- Nationality: Algerian
- Born: 20 March 1974 (age 52) Constantine, Algeria

Sport
- Country: Algeria
- Sport: Athletics (track)
- Disability: Limb deficiency
- Disability class: T56
- Club: GSP Alger
Medal record
Women's para athletics
Representing Algeria
Paralympic Games
Gold medal – first place	2004 Athens	Shot put F56/F58
Bronze medal – third place	2008 Beijing	Shot put F57/F58
Bronze medal – third place	2008 Beijing	Discus throw F57/F58
Bronze medal – third place	2016 Rio	Javelin throw F56
Bronze medal – third place	2016 Rio	Shot put F56
World Championships
Silver medal – second place	2013 Lyon	Shot put F56
Bronze medal – third place	2011 Christchurch	Discus throw F57/58
Bronze medal – third place	2011 Christchurch	Shot put F57/58
Pan Arab Games
Silver medal – second place	2011 Doha	Discus throw F57/58
Silver medal – second place	2011 Doha	Shot put F57/58

Nadia Medjmedj (born 20 March 1974) is a Paralympian athlete from Algeria competing mainly in category F56 shot put and discus throw events.

She competed in the 2008 Summer Paralympics in Beijing, China. There, she won a bronze medal in both the women's shot put F57/F58 event and the women's discus throw F57/F58 event.
