= Irena Perminienė =

Lithuanian former Paralympic athlete

Personal information
- Born: 17 April 1958 (age 68) Klaipėda, Soviet Union

Sport
- Country: Lithuania
- Sport: Paralympic athletics
- Disability: Spinal cord injury
- Disability class: F54
- Event: Shot put
Medal record
Paralympic athletics
Representing Lithuania
World Championships
Silver medal – second place	2006 Assen	Shot put F54
European Championships
Silver medal – second place	2012 Stadskanaal	Shot put F54/55/56

Irena Perminienė (born 17 April 1958) is a Lithuanian former Paralympic athlete who competed in shot put at international track and field competitions. She is a World and European silver medalist and has competed at the 2008 and 2012 Summer Paralympics.

== Accident ==
At the age of twelve, Perminienė boarded her school bus one morning in early November in her hometown of Užkalnis. The bus was full of schoolchildren heading to school, the school bus was on an icy road, lost control and turned over onto its side. Perminienė suffered a spinal cord injury from this accident. Once Perminienė started using a wheelchair following the accident, she tried out various wheelchair sports such as Paralympic powerlifting, sitting volleyball and wheelchair racing.

In 1987, she competed in her first sporting competition. She took part in a 10 km wheelchair race in Brno, Czech Republic at a Paralympic Athletics Grand Prix, where she was up against twenty other participants, she described the race wasn't an easy race, the wheelchair that she was given didn't meet sporting standards at the time: she explained that an elite racing wheelchair weighed around four kilograms, the wheelchair that she was given at the time was much heavier and was estimated to have weighed 30 kg, she had difficulty going uphill with the wheelchair however she won the race. Following her success, she began competing at various marathons and claimed that goat's milk was her supplement for her marathon success.

Perminienė wanted to participate at the 1980 Summer Paralympics, at the time the-then Soviet authorities refused to host a Paralympic Games and so the Games were held in Arnhem, Netherlands instead following the authourities denying the existence of people with disabilities in their country which came as a big shock to Perminienė and her other teammates who couldn't participate at the Games following the dispute. She eventually participated at her first Games 28 years later at the 2008 Summer Paralympics in Beijing competing for Lithuania, however before the Games, she had a ruptured shoulder and undertook surgery in January then went to the Paralympics in September. Perminienė finished in sixth place in the shot put F54 final despite having pain in her shoulder. She competed at the 2012 Summer Paralympics in London, she finished in eighth place in the shot put F54 final.

== Personal life ==
Perminienė studied social pedagogy and psychology at the Šiauliai University and she currently works as a wellness coordinator at an employment centre for disabled people. She was also awarded the Order of Merit for Lithuania in 2010 and was recognised as one of Lithuania's top ten athletes in 2011 and 2012, she has received congratulations from the-then President of Lithuania Dalia Grybauskaitė on three occasions following her success at continental and international competitions.
