= Mariia Pomazan =

Ukrainian Paralympic athlete (born 1988)

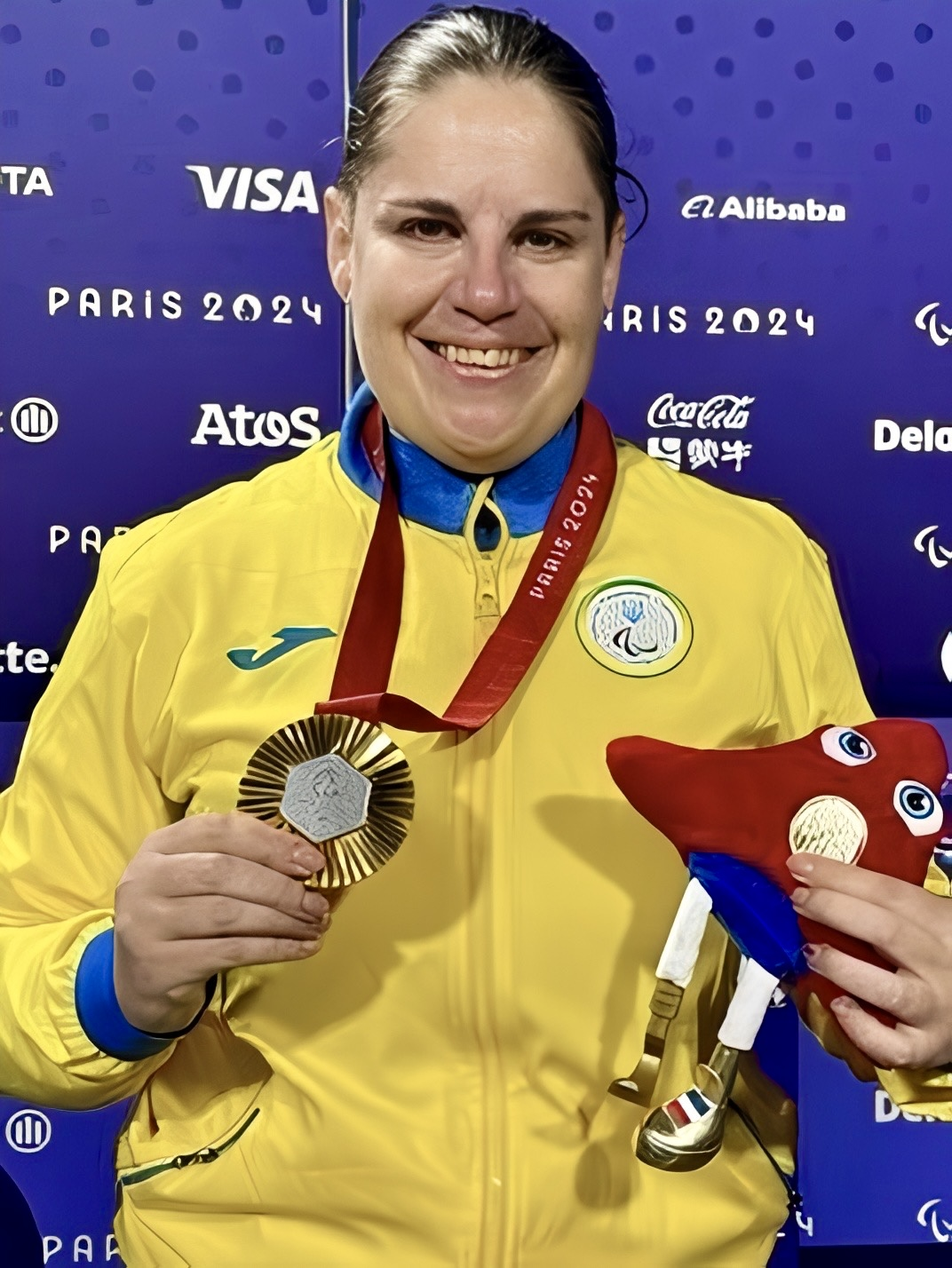
- Pomazan at the 2024 Summer Paralympics

Personal information
- Nationality: Ukrainian
- Born: 15 October 1988 (age 37) Zaporizhzhia, Ukraine
- Education: History – Zaporozhskiy National University, Ukraine
- Height: 172 cm (68 in)

Sport
- Sport: Paralympic athletics
- Disability: Cerebral palsy
- Disability class: F35
- Events: Discus throw; Shot put
- Coached by: Tamara Edisherashvili
Medal record
Women's para athletics
Representing Ukraine
Paralympic Games
Gold medal – first place	2012 London	Shot put – F35/F36
Gold medal – first place	2020 Tokyo	Shot put – F35
Gold medal – first place	2024 Paris	Shot put – F35
Silver medal – second place	2012 London	Discus throw – F35/F36
Silver medal – second place	2016 Rio de Janeiro	Shot put – F35
World Championships
Gold medal – first place	2011 Christchurch	Shot put – F35/F36
Gold medal – first place	2011 Christchurch	Discus throw – F35/F36
Gold medal – first place	2013 Lyon	Shot put – F35/F36
Gold medal – first place	2013 Lyon	Discus throw – F35/F36
Gold medal – first place	2015 Doha	Shot put – F35
Gold medal – first place	2017 London	Shot put – F35
Gold medal – first place	2023 Paris	Shot put – F35
Gold medal – first place	2025 New Delhi	Shot put – F35

Mariia Pomazan (Ukrainian: Марія Олександрівна Помазан; born 15 October 1988) is a Ukrainian Paralympic athlete. She competes in throwing events in the F35 classification for athletes with cerebral palsy. As of April 2014, she held the Women's F35 world records for shot put and discus.

== Career ==
Pomazan started athletics at age 19 and made her international debut in 2010. At the 2011 IPC Athletics World Championships in Christchurch, she won two gold medals with F35 world record throws in both shot put and discus. She broke both these world records at the 2012 Summer Paralympics in London.

In London, a miscalculation of the Raza Points System in the combined F35/F36 discus event caused extended confusion and protest. Pomazan was initially awarded the gold medal over world record breaking F36 athlete Wu Qing, then relegated to silver. One official described the situation as "a shambles." A second medal ceremony was held, which Pomazan refused to attend. Several days later she was required to return the discus gold medal. Pomazan later won gold in Women's Shot Put – F35/36.

At the 2013 IPC Athletics World Championships in Lyon, Pomazan won the F35/36 shot put and discus events, breaking her own F35 World records in both events.

In 2017 the Chinese athlete Wang Jun broke the F35 javelin record at the World Para Athletics Grand Prix in Beijing. Wang's throw of 12.1m was 50 cm more that Pomezan's previous record.
