= Maria Stamatoula =

Greek Paralympic athlete (born 1972)

Medal record

Paralympic athletics

Representing Greece

Paralympic Games
Bronze medal – third place	2008 Beijing	Shot put - F32-34/52-53

World Championships
Gold medal – first place	2006 Assen	Shot put F32-34
Silver medal – second place	2011 Christchurch	Shot put F32/33/34
Silver medal – second place	2017 London	Shot put F32
Bronze medal – third place	2013 Lyon	Shot put F32/33/34

European Championships
Silver medal – second place	2014 Swansea	Shot put - F32/33

Maria Stamatoula (born 15 August 1972) is a Paralympian athlete from Greece competing mainly in F32 shot put and club throw events.

She competed in the 2008 Summer Paralympics in Beijing, China. There she won a bronze medal in the women's F32-34/52-53 shot put event. In the 2011 IPC Athletics World Championships she won a silver medal in the Women's Shot Put event, and broke the previous F32 world record in shot put.

She was awarded as the Best Greek female athlete with a disability for 2010, 2011 and 2017.
