= Eva Berná =

Czech Paralympic athlete (born 1986)

Personal information
- Born: 25 May 1986 (age 40) Městec Králové, Czechoslovakia
Medal record
Women's para athletics
Representing Czech Republic
Paralympic Games
Bronze medal – third place	2004 Athens	Shot put - F37/38
Bronze medal – third place	2008 Beijing	Shot put - F37/38
Bronze medal – third place	2012 London	Shot put - F37
Bronze medal – third place	2016 Rio de Janeiro	Shot put - F37
World Championships
Silver medal – second place	2013 Lyon	Shot put - F37
European Championships
Gold medal – first place	2012 Stadskanaal	Shot put - F37
Gold medal – first place	2014 Swansea	Shot put - T37
Silver medal – second place	2016 Grosseto	Discus throw - T38
Bronze medal – third place	2014 Swansea	Javelin - T37

Eva Berná (born 25 May 1986), also known as Eva Datinská, is a Czech Paralympic athlete competing mainly in category F37 shot put events.

She competed in the 2000 Summer Paralympics in Sydney, Australia. There she competed in the F37 discus, javelin and shot put events but failed to win any medals.

At the 2004 Summer Paralympics in Athens, Greece., she won a bronze medal in the women's F37-38 shot put event but failed to win a medal in either the F37 discus or F35-38 javelin. She also competed in the 2008 Summer Paralympics in Beijing, China. There she won her second bronze medal in the F37-38 shot put event but again failed to medal in the F37/38 discus.
