= Alla Solomonova =

Ukrainian Paralympic athlete

Medal record

Paralympic athletics

Representing Ukraine

Paralympic Games
| Gold medal – first place | 2008 Beijing | Shot Put - F35/F36 |
| Bronze medal – third place | 2004 Athens | Shot Put - F35/F36 |
| Bronze medal – third place | 2008 Beijing | Discus Throw - F35/F36 |

IPC Athletics World Championships
| Silver medal – second place | 2015 Doha | Shot put - F36 |
| Bronze medal – third place | 2011 Christchurch | Shot put - F35/36 |

World Para Athletics European Championships
| Silver medal – second place | 2012 Stadskanaal | Shot put - F35/36 |
| Silver medal – second place | 2014 Swansea | Shot put - F35/36 |

Alla Solomonova (Malchyk) is a Paralympian athlete from Ukraine competing mainly in category F35/F36 shot put events.

== Biography ==
She competed in the 2004 Summer Paralympics in Athens, Greece. There she won a bronze medal in the women's shot put F35/F36 event. She also set a world record in the F36 discus throw while finishing fifth in the F35/F36/F38 discus throw.

Four years later she competed in the 2008 Summer Paralympics in Beijing, China. There she improved to gold medal in the women's shot put F35/F36 event and bronze in the women's discus throw F35/F36.
