= Inês Fernandes =

Portuguese Paralympic athlete

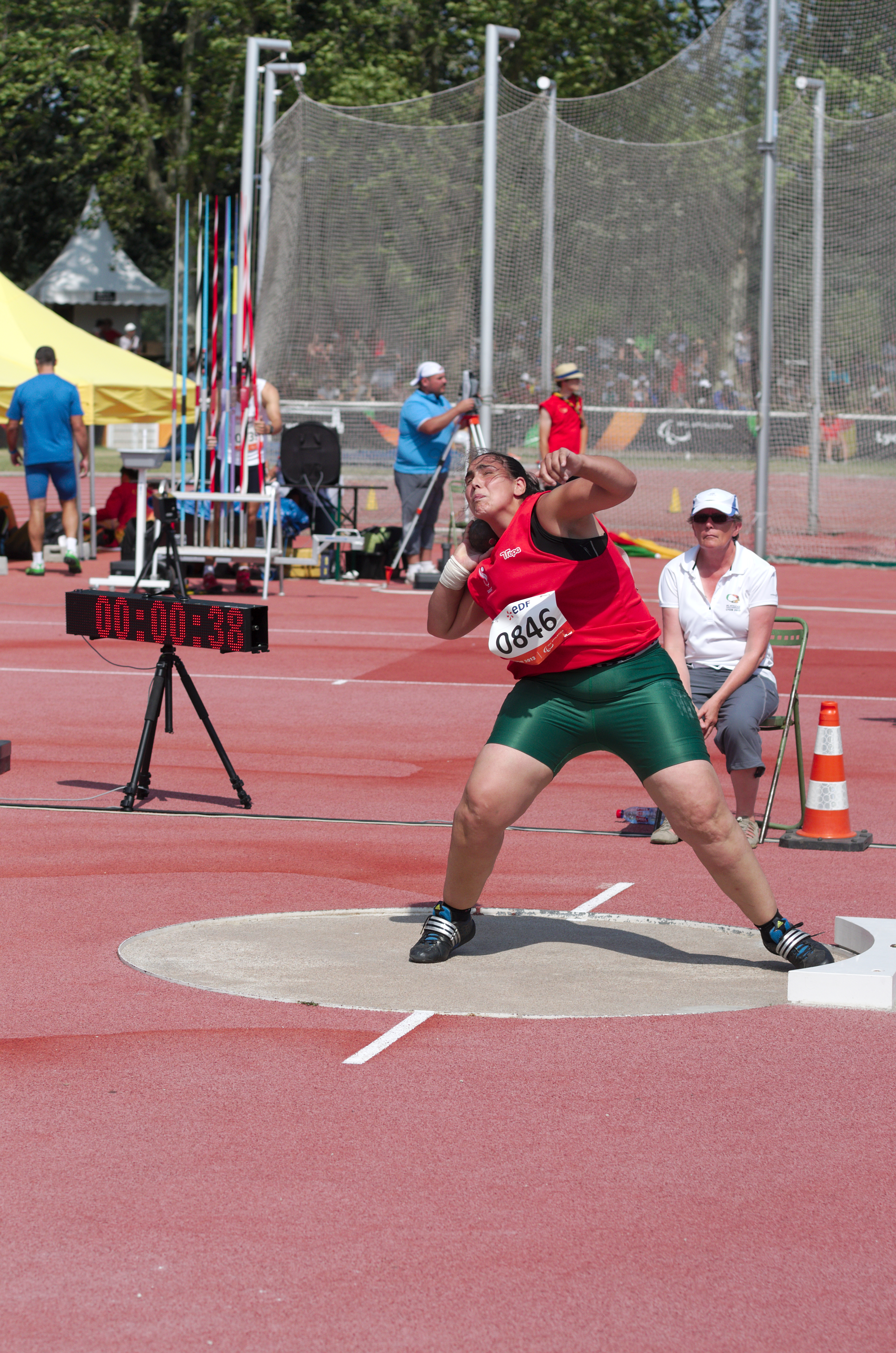
- Fernandes in 2013 IPC Athletics World Championships competing at shot put F20

Personal information
- Born: 28 June 1988 (age 38) Valença, Portugal
- Height: 1.75 m (5 ft 9 in)

Sport
- Country: Portugal
- Sport: Paralympic athletics
- Disability class: F20
- Event(s): Shot put Hammer throw Discus throw Javelin throw
- Club: Associação Desportiva Recreativa e Cultural Lovelhe, Viana do Castelo
- Coached by: Jorge Rodrigues
Medal record
Paralympic athletics
Representing Portugal
INAS Global Games
Silver medal – second place	2011 Liguria	Women's hammer throw
Silver medal – second place	2015 Guayaquil	Women's hammer throw
Silver medal – second place	2019 Brisbane	Women's hammer throw
Bronze medal – third place	2015 Guayaquil	Women's javelin throw
Bronze medal – third place	2015 Guayaquil	Women's shot put
World Para Athletics Championships
Bronze medal – third place	2011 Christchurch	Women's shot put F20
INAS World Athletics Championships
Gold medal – first place	2013 Prague	Women's hammer throw
Silver medal – second place	2013 Prague	Women's discus throw
Silver medal – second place	2013 Prague	Women's shot put
World Para Athletics European Championships
Bronze medal – third place	2016 Grosseto	Women's shot put F20
INAS European Athletics Championships
Gold medal – first place	2012 Gävle	Women's hammer throw
Gold medal – first place	2012 Gävle	Women's shot put
Gold medal – first place	2014 Bergen op Zoom	Women's hammer throw
Silver medal – second place	2010 Varaždin	Women's hammer throw
Silver medal – second place	2010 Varaždin	Women's shot put
Silver medal – second place	2014 Bergen op Zoom	Women's shot put
Silver medal – second place	2014 Bergen op Zoom	Women's discus throw
Bronze medal – third place	2010 Varaždin	Women's discus throw
Bronze medal – third place	2012 Gävle	Women's javelin throw

Inês Fernandes (born 28 June 1988) is a Portuguese Paralympic athlete who competes in shot put at the Paralympic Games and hammer throw, javelin throw and discus throw at the INAS World Athletics Championships and INAS Global Games.
