= Frances Herrmann =

German Paralympic athlete

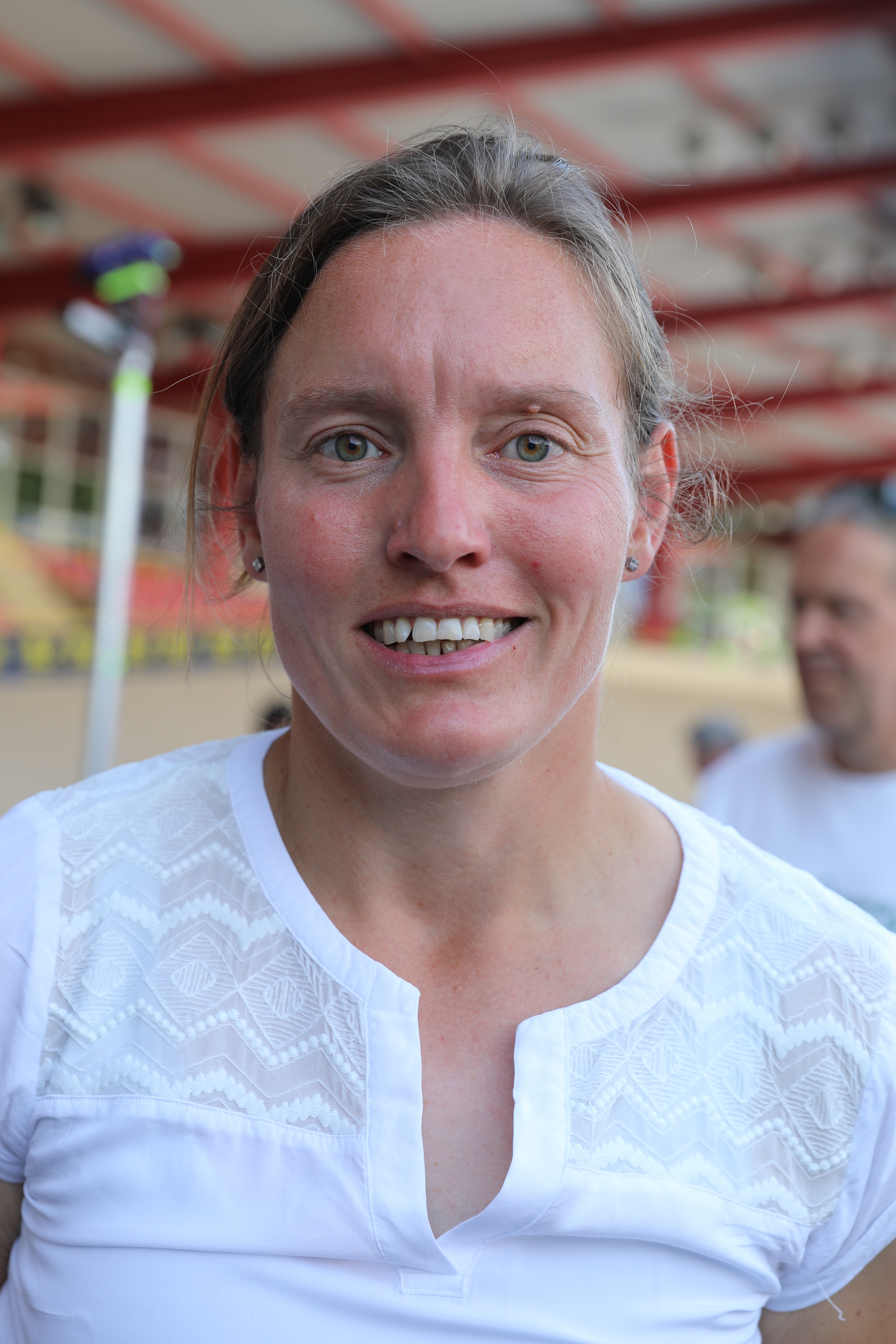
- Herrmann in 2024.

Medal record

Paralympic athletics

Representing Germany

Paralympic Games
Silver medal – second place	2008 Beijing	Discus throw F32-34/51-53
Silver medal – second place	2020 Tokyo	Javelin throw F34
Bronze medal – third place	2016 Rio	Javelin throw F34

World Championships
Silver medal – second place	2023 Paris	Javelin throw F34
Bronze medal – third place	2015 Doha	Javelin throw F34

European Championships
Silver medal – second place	2016 Grosseto	Javelin throw F34
Bronze medal – third place	2014 Swansea	Shot put F34
Bronze medal – third place	2016 Grosseto	Shot put F34

Frances Herrmann (born 22 June 1989) is a Paralympian athlete from Germany competing mainly in category F34 throwing events.

== Career ==
She competed in the 2008 Summer Paralympics in Beijing, China. There she won a silver medal in the women's F32-34/51-53 discus throw event as well as competing in the F32-34/52/53 shot put and the F33/34/52/53 javelin throw.
