= Taiga Kantāne =

Latvian Paralympic athlete

Personal information
- National team: Latvia
- Born: March 27, 1970 (age 55) Bauska, Semigallia, Latvian SSR, Soviet Union

Sport
- Country: Latvia
- Sport: Discus, shot put
- Disability: Paralysis on one side
- Disability class: F37
- Updated on 17 November 2017

Taiga Kantāne (born 27 March 1970) is a Latvian athlete who competed for her country at the 2012 and 2016 Summer Paralympics in the discus and shot put.

== Career ==
Taiga Kantāne was born on 27 March 1970 in Bauska, Semigallia. She had a stroke which paralysed one side of her body in 2005. After being unable to continue with her previous hobbies because of the disability, Kantāne looked for an active pursuit. In 2007 with the advice of coach Aldi Crane, she took up discus and shot put, seeking to go to the Summer Paralympics.

Kantāne was selected as one of nine members of the Latvian team for the 2012 Summer Paralympics. In the F37 class, she finished in eight place in the shot put with a throw of 9.21 metres (30.2 ft) which was her best of the season. In the discus, she finished ninth in the same class. She was once again named to the Latvian team for the 2016 Summer Paralympics in Rio de Janeiro, Brazil. Kantāne finished in eighth place in the shot put with a throw of 8.78 metres (28.8 ft).
