= Eva Kacanu =

Czech Republic Paralympic athlete

Personal information
- Born: 20 May 1965 (age 61)
Medal record
Paralympic athletics
Representing Czech Republic
Paralympic Games
Gold medal – first place	2008 Beijing	Shot Put - F54/F56
Silver medal – second place	2004 Athens	Shot Put - F54/F55

Eva Kacanu (born 20 May 1965) is a Paralympian athlete from the Czech Republic competing mainly in category F54/F56 shot put events.

She competed at the 2004 Summer Paralympics in Athens, Greece. There she won a silver medal in the women's shot put F54/F55 event.

Four years later she competed at the 2008 Summer Paralympics in Beijing, China. This time she won the women's shot put F54/F56 event.
