= Beverley Jones =

Welsh Paralympic track and field athlete

Personal information
- Full name: Beverley Ann Jones
- Nationality: British
- Born: 17 October 1974 (age 51) Queensferry, Flintshire, Wales

Sport
- Country: Wales, Great Britain
- Sport: Athletics
- Event(s): sprinting Shot put Discus
- Club: Gloucester AC
- Coached by: John Parkin

Achievements and titles
- Paralympic finals: 2000, 2004, 2008, 2012, 2016
- Personal best(s): Shot Put: 10.57m Discus: 31.99m
Medal record
Representing Great Britain
Women's athletics
Commonwealth Games
Bronze medal – third place	2006 Melbourne	EAD 100 m
Paralympic Games
Bronze medal – third place	2012 London	Discus throw F37
World Championships
Bronze medal – third place	2013 Lyon	Discus throw F37
European Championships
Silver medal – second place	2012 Stadskanaal	Shot put – F37

Beverley Jones (born 17 October 1974) is a Paralympian from Wales competing in category F37 throwing events. Jones won a bronze medal at the 2006 Commonwealth Games as an EAD in the 100m sprint. Jones has qualified for four Summer Paralympics from 2000 to 2016 finishing fourth thrice, in the sprint in 2000 at Sydney, in the shot put at Athens in 2004, and in the discus in 2016.

== History ==
Jones was born in Queensferry, Flintshire in north Wales in 1974. Jones, who has cerebral palsy, first began playing representative sports when she played cricket for Wales, and was in the team that beat England at Lords in 1996. She was introduced to athletics at the Wrexham Sports Club for the Disabled in 1997 and began entering sprinting events in her 1998. In 2000, she was selected for the Great Britain team at the Summer Paralympics, competing in the T38 sprint. She finished 4th in the 100m and 8th in the 200m.

In 2004 Jones was reselected for the Great Britain Paralympic team for the Summer games in Athens, this time qualifying as F38 for the combined F37/38 shot put, finishing just outside the medals in fourth place. She was reclassified to the higher disability grade of F37 after the competition. In the 2005 CP World Championships in Connecticut, USA she took gold in the shot put, 100m and 200m sprints. At the 2006 IPC World Athletics Championships in Assen, Netherlands, she set a F37 shot put world record of 10.57m. Jones was still combining her shot put with sprinting when she was chosen to represent Wales at the 2006 Commonwealth Games. Since the Manchester Games in 2002, the Commonwealth Games had introduced a limited number of events for elite athletes with a disability. The only T37 event at the Games was women's sprinting, for which Jones qualified, winning the bronze medal in the final.

As of the 2008 Paralympics in Beijing, Jones began concentrating on throwing events, mainly discus and shot put. She qualified for both events in China, finishing 5th in the T37 Shot Put and 7th in the T37 discus with a European record throw of 27.27m. Her 5th place in shot put saw Jones throwing her personal best of 10.35m.

In 2011 Jones represented Great Britain in both the Shot and discus at the IPC Athletics World Championships in New Zealand. She threw a European record in the discus of 30.62m, but was unable to beat Na Mi of China, and finished in second place, taking silver.

2012 saw Jones qualify for Great Britain at her fourth Paralympic Games, on this occasion in the F37 shot put and the F37 discus at London. In her first event, the shot put, she threw 9.85m to end in seventh place. Later in the Games, on 6 September at the London Olympic Stadium, she recorded a distance of 30.99m in the discus which gave Jones a bronze medal, her first Paralympic podium finish.

Jones qualified for the 2016 Paralympic Games in F37 discus and placed 5th with a throw of 28.53m.
