= Martina Willing =

German Paralympic athlete (born 1959)

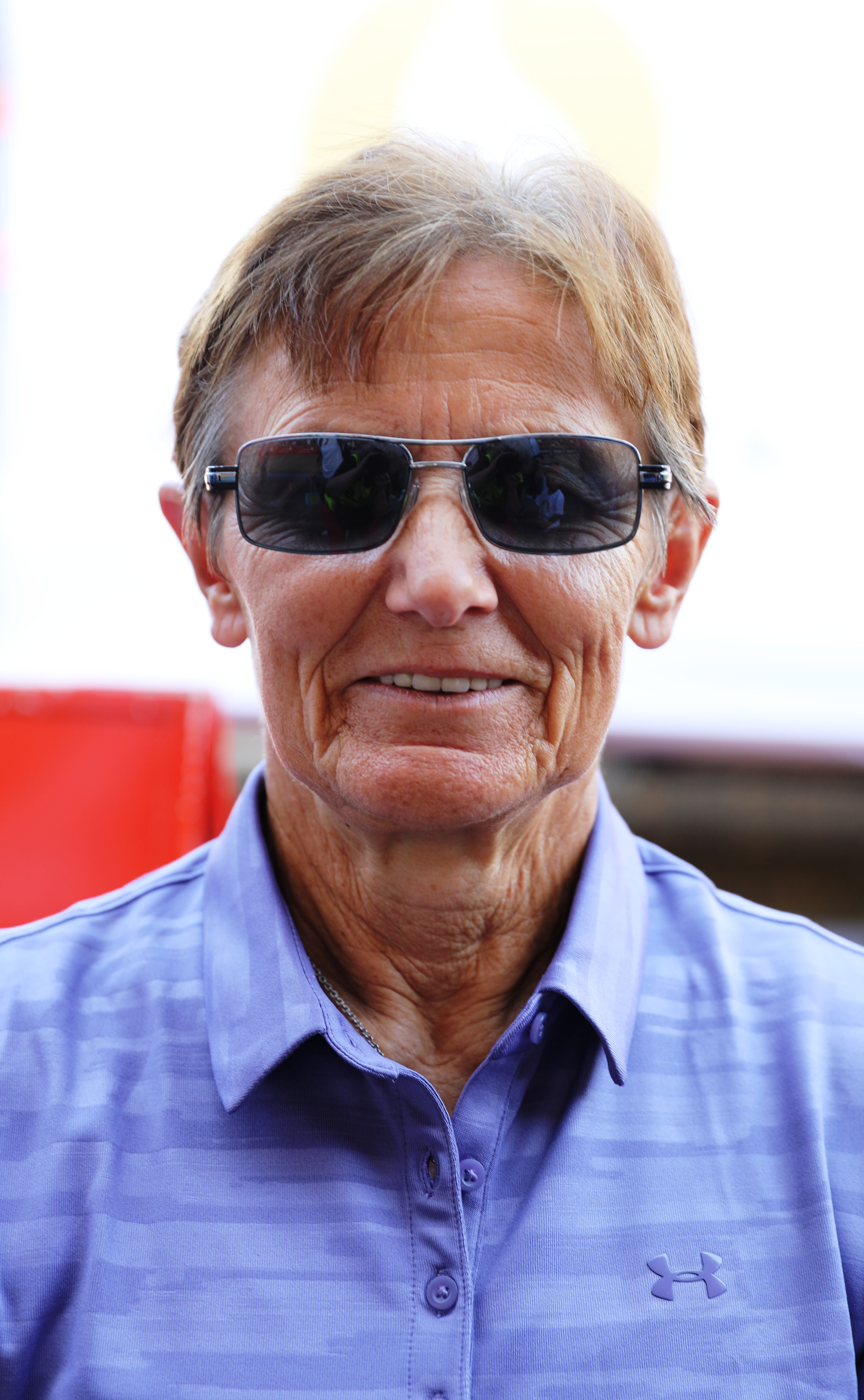

Personal information
- Full name: Martina Monika Willing
- Born: 3 October 1959 (age 66)

Sport
- Sport: Athletics
- Disability: Blind and paraplegic
- Disability class: F56 (F11 until 1994)
- Event(s): Javelin, Discus, Shot put
Medal record
Paralympic athletics
Representing Germany
Paralympic Games
Gold medal – first place	1992 Barcelona	Javelin throw – B1–3
Gold medal – first place	1996 Atlanta	Javelin throw – F53–54
Gold medal – first place	2008 Beijing	Javelin – F54–56
Silver medal – second place	1992 Barcelona	Discus – B1
Silver medal – second place	2000 Sydney	Shot put – F57
Silver medal – second place	2008 Beijing	Shot put – F54–56
Silver medal – second place	2016 Rio	Javelin – F56
Bronze medal – third place	1992 Barcelona	Shot put – B1
Bronze medal – third place	1996 Atlanta	Discus – F53–54
Bronze medal – third place	1996 Atlanta	Shot put – F53–54
Bronze medal – third place	2004 Athens	Shot put – F56–58
Bronze medal – third place	2012 London	Javelin – F54-F56
IPC World Championships
Gold medal – first place	2013 Lyon	Shot put – F55/56/57
Gold medal – first place	2015 Doha	Javelin – F56
Silver medal – second place	2011 Christchurch	Javelin – F54/55/56
Silver medal – second place	2013 Lyon	Discus – F54/55/56
Bronze medal – third place	2017 London	Javelin – F56
European Championships
Gold medal – first place	2016 Grosseto	Javelin – F56
Silver medal – second place	2016 Grosseto	Shot put – F57
Bronze medal – third place	2014 Swansea	Shot put – F57
Bronze medal – third place	2016 Grosseto	Discus – F57
Cross-country skiing
Representing Germany
Paralympic Games
Silver medal – second place	1994 Lillehammer	3x2.5 km relay – open
Biathlon
Representing Germany
Paralympic Games
Bronze medal – third place	1994 Lillehammer	7.5 km free technique – B1-3

Martina Monika Willing (born 3 October 1959) is a Paralympic athlete from Germany competing in field events. She is both blind and paraplegic. Until 1994 she competed in the F11 classification for vision impaired athletes; following her paralysis, she returned to competition as a seated thrower. Willing has competed and medalled in eight Paralympic Games – all seven summer games from 1992 in Barcelona to 2016 in Rio as well as at the 1994 winter games in Lillehammer. Complications during knee surgery following a fall at the Lillehammer Paralympics led to her paralysis.

As of May 2017, she is world record holder in both F11 and F56 javelin, and P11 pentathlon events.

Willing won the Whang Youn Dai Achievement Award in 2000. She worked as a biologist, but has now retired.
