= Stela Eneva =

Bulgarian Paralympic athlete

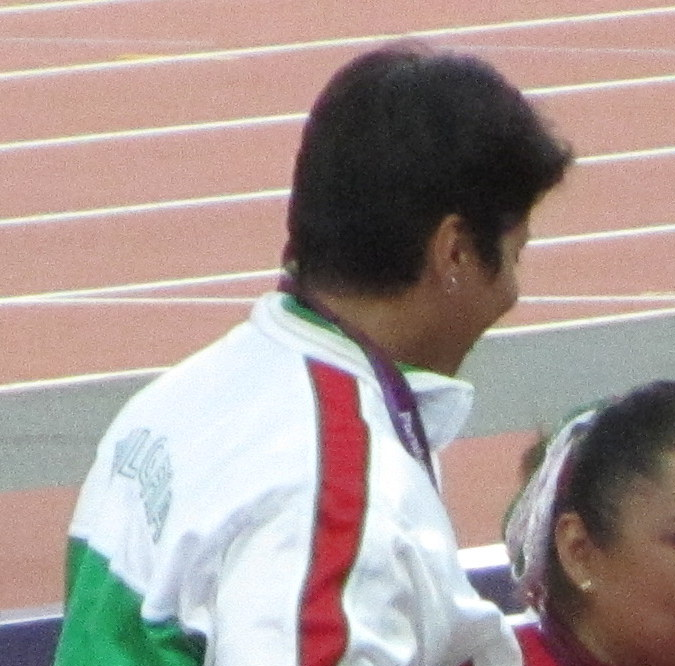
- Eneva at London 2012 Summer Paralympics

Personal information
- Born: 18 July 1975 (age 50)
Medal record
Women's para-athletics
Representing Bulgaria
Paralympic Games
Silver medal – second place	2008 Beijing	Discus Throw - F57-58
Silver medal – second place	2012 London	Discus Throw - F57-58
IPC World Championships
Silver medal – second place	2015 Doha	Discus - F57
European Championships
Gold medal – first place	2012 Stadskanaal	Shot put - F57/58
Gold medal – first place	2014 Swansea	Shot put - T57
Gold medal – first place	2014 Swansea	Discus - T57

Stela Eneva (Bulgarian: Стела Енева, born 18 July 1975) is a Paralympian athlete from Bulgaria competing mainly in throwing events.

She competed at the 2004 Summer Paralympics in Athens, Greece. There she competed in the F42-46 discus throw, shot put and javelin throw events but failed to win any medals.

She had more luck when she competed in the 2008 Summer Paralympics in Beijing, China. There she won a silver medal in the women's F57-58 discus throw event but could not medal in the shot put. She also won silver at the 2012 Paralympics in London.
