= Tatjana Majcen Ljubič =

Slovenian Paralympic athlete

Medal record

Paralympic athletics

Representing Slovenia

Paralympic Games
| Silver medal – second place | 2004 Athens | Javelin Throw - F54/55 |
| Bronze medal – third place | 2004 Athens | Shot Put - F54/55 |

Tatjana Majcen Ljubič is a Paralympian athlete from Slovenia competing mainly in category F54/55 throwing events.

Tatjana has competed in two Paralympics, each time competing in all three throws. She has won two medals both in 2004 a silver in the F54/55 javelin and a bronze in the F54/55 shot put. Her other games in 2008 were ultimately unsuccessful.
