= Shirlene Coelho =

Brazilian Paralympic athlete

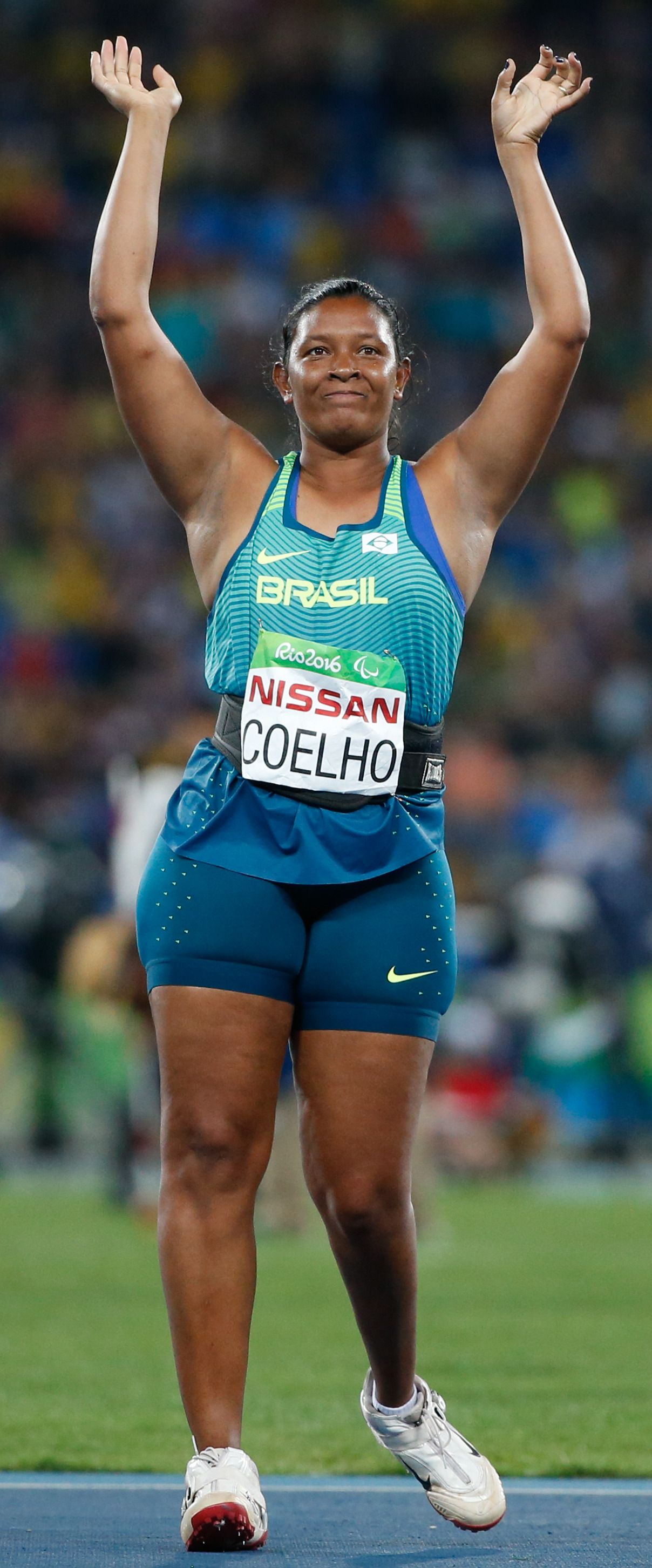
- Coelho at the 2016 Paralympics

Personal information
- Born: 19 February 1981 (age 45) Corumbá, Brazil
- Height: 1.69 m (5 ft 7 in)

Sport
- Sport: Paralympic athletics
- Disability class: T37
- Events: Javelin throw, discus throw, shot put
Medal record
Women's para athletics
Representing Brazil
Paralympic Games
Gold medal – first place	2012 London	Javelin throw F37/38
Gold medal – first place	2016 Rio	Javelin throw F37
Silver medal – second place	2008 Beijing	Javelin throw F35-38
Silver medal – second place	2016 Rio	Discus throw F37/F38
World Championships
Gold medal – first place	2015 Doha	Javelin F37
Parapan American Games
Gold medal – first place	2007 Rio de Janeiro	Javelin throw F35-38
Gold medal – first place	2011 Guadalajara	Shot put F35/36/37
Gold medal – first place	2011 Guadalajara	Javelin throw F37/38
Silver medal – second place	2007 Rio de Janeiro	Shot put F35-38
Silver medal – second place	2007 Rio de Janeiro	Discus throw F35-38
Silver medal – second place	2011 Guadalajara	Discus throw F35/36/37
Bronze medal – third place	2015 Toronto	Discus throw F37/38/44

Shirlene Coelho (born 19 February 1981) is a Paralympian athlete. She competed in the T37 javelin throw, discus throw and shot put at the 2008, 2012 and 2016 Paralympics. At the 2016 Rio Paralympic games, she won a gold medal in Women's Javelin F37 and won a silver medal in Women's Discus Throw F38. At the 2012 London Paralympic games, she won a gold medal at the Women's Javelin F37/38 event. At the 2008 Beijing Paralympic games, she won a silver medal at the Women's Javelin F35-38.
