= Marta Prokofyeva =

Russian former Paralympic athlete (born 1987)

Personal information
- Born: 31 October 1987 (age 38) Zheleznogorsk, Krasnoyarsk Krai, Soviet Union

Sport
- Sport: Paralympic athletics
- Disability class: F12
Medal record
Representing Russia
World Championships
Gold medal – first place	2013 Lyon	Shot put F12
Bronze medal – third place	2011 Christchurch	Shot put F12
European Championships
Gold medal – first place	2012 Stadskanaal	Shot put F12

Marta Nikolayevna Prokofyeva (Russian: Марта Николаевна Прокофьева; born 31 October 1987) is a Russian former Paralympic athlete who competed at international track and field competitions. She is a World and European champion in shot put and has competed at the 2012 Summer Paralympics but did not medal.
