= Athletics at the 2024 Summer Paralympics – Women's discus throw =

Event at the 2024 Summer Paralympics

Athletics – Women's discus throw at the XVII Paralympic Games
- Venue: Stade de France
- Dates: 30 August – 6 September 2024
- No. of events: 7
- Competitors: 81 from 38 nations

The Women's discus throw athletics events for the 2024 Summer Paralympics took place at the Stade de France from August 27 to September 4, 2024. A total of 7 events were contested in this discipline.

== Schedule ==
Q	Qualification	F	Final

Date	Fri 30		Sat 31		Sun 1		Mon 2		Tue 3		Wed 4		Thu 5		Fri 6	
Event	M	E	M	E	M	E	M	E	M	E	M	E	M	E	M	E
Discus throw F11									F							
Discus throw F38																F
Discus throw F41											F					
Discus throw F53								F								
Discus throw F55	F															
Discus throw F57	Q		F													
Discus throw F64					F											

== Medal summary ==
The following is a summary of the medals awarded across all discus throw events.

Classification	Gold		Silver		Bronze	
F11	Zhang Liangmin; China	39.08 SB	Assunta Legnante; Italy	38.01 SB	Xue Enhui; China	37.67
F38	Simoné Kruger; South Africa	38.70 PR	Li Yingli; China	38.64 PR	Xiomara Saldarriaga; Colombia	38.36 AR
F41	Raoua Tlili; Tunisia	36.55 SB	Youssra Karim; Morocco	36.46	Estefany López; Ecuador	30.89 AR
F53	Elizabeth Rodrigues Gomes; Brazil	17.37 PR	Keiko Onidani; Japan	15.78 AR	Zoia Ovsii; Ukraine	14.17 SB
F55	Érica Castaño; Colombia	26.70	Dong Feixia; China	26.67 AsR	Rosa María Guerrero; Mexico	25.81
F57	Nassima Saifi; Algeria	35.55 PB	Xu Mian; China	32.81 PB	Mokhigul Khamdamova; Uzbekistan	32.75
F64	Yang Yue; China	42.39 SB	Yao Juan; China	41.98	Osiris Machado; Mexico	40.01

== Results ==
=== F11 ===
==== Records ====
Prior to the competition, the existing records were as follows:

World Record	Zhang Liangmin (CHN)	40.83	(Japan) Tokyo	31 August 2021
Paralympic Record	Zhang Liangmin (CHN)	40.83	(Japan) Tokyo	31 August 2021

Area	Record		Athlete	Location	Date
Africa	Vacant				
America	40.12		(Brazil) Izabela Campos	(Brazil) São Paulo	16 March 2024
Asia	40.83	WR	(China) Zhang Liangmin	(Japan) Tokyo	31 August 2021
Europe	40.25		(Italy) Assunta Legnante	(Japan) Tokyo	31 August 2021
Oceania	15.42		(Tonga) Alailupe Valeti	(South Korea) Busan	28 October 2002

==== Results ====
The final in this classification took place on 3 September 2024, at 12:00:

Rank	Athlete	Nationality	1	2	3	4	5	6	Best	Notes
1st place, gold medalist(s)	Zhang Liangmin	China	35.93	39.08	38.50	37.89	x	37.13	39.08	SB
2nd place, silver medalist(s)	Assunta Legnante	Italy	x	x	36.07	38.01	30.85	34.74	38.01	SB
3rd place, bronze medalist(s)	Xue Enhui	China	37.65	37.67	37.03	x	34.22	37.31	37.67	
4	Izabela Campos	Brazil	x	x	x	29.93	x	34.94	34.94	
5	Oksana Dobrovolskaja	Lithuania	33.33	33.23	34.49	33.92	x	x	34.49	
6	Yesenia Restrepo	Colombia	26.33	x	27.39	31.06	33.77	30.57	33.77	SB
7	Elena Shakh	Neutral Paralympic Athletes	32.14	30.57	32.80	33.34	x	x	33.34	
8	Büşra Nur Tırıklı	Turkey	x	26.04	x	x	26.08	x	26.08	

=== F38 ===
==== Records ====
Prior to the competition, the existing records were as follows:

World Record	Simoné Kruger (RSA)	38.82	(Japan) Kobe	25 May 2024
Paralympic Record	Rosa Carolina Castro (MEX)	33.73	(Japan) Tokyo	4 September 2021

Area	Record		Athlete	Location	Date
Africa	38.82	WR	(South Africa) Simoné Kruger	(Japan) Kobe	25 May 2024
America	37.83		(Canada) Renee Foessel	(Canada) Guelph	16 June 2021
Asia	Vacant				
Europe	32.95		(Republic of Ireland) Noelle Lenihan	(Germany) Berlin	22 August 2018
Oceania	34.02		(Australia) Samantha Schmidt	(France) Paris	17 July 2023

==== Results ====
The final in this classification took place on 6 September 2024, at 19:10:

Rank	Athlete	Nationality	Class	1	2	3	4	5	6	Best	Notes
1st place, gold medalist(s)	Simoné Kruger	South Africa	F38	37.69	38.35	38.70	37.59	X	37.44	38.70	PR
2nd place, silver medalist(s)	Li Yingli	China	F37	38.46	31.58	36.90	36.96	X	38.64	38.64	PR
3rd place, bronze medalist(s)	Xiomara Saldarriaga	Colombia	F38	38.27	X	36.83	38.36	38.32	37.75	38.36	AR
4	Mi Na	China	F37	37.25	X	37.12	37.51	X	X	37.51	
5	Rosa Carolina Castro	Mexico	F38	32.84	33.04	34.50	X	X	X	34.50	
6	Renee Foessel	Canada	F38	34.40	X	X	X	X	29.75	34.40	
7	Samantha Schmidt	Australia	F38	29.00	29.61	33.05	X	X	32.12	33.05	SB
8	María Henao	Colombia	F37	31.30	32.27	33.01	30.51	31.80	29.40	33.01	SB
9	Irina Vertinskaya	Neutral Paralympic Athletes	F37	27.23	28.24	29.15				29.15	
10	Ivana Purkić	Croatia	F38	26.85	X	28.67				28.67	
11	Ella Hose	Australia	F37	27.90	28.36	X				28.36	PB
12	Karen Tassi	Argentina	F37	24.92	23.09	X				24.92	SB
13	Yomaira Cohen	Venezuela	F37	23.98	24.27	22.19				24.27	SB
14	Meleane Falemaka	Tonga	F37	16.58	16.71	15.86				16.71	PB

=== F41 ===
==== Records ====
Prior to the competition, the existing records were as follows:

World Record	Raoua Tlili (TUN)	37.91	(Japan) Tokyo	1 September 2021
Paralympic Record	Raoua Tlili (TUN)	37.91	(Japan) Tokyo	1 September 2021

Area	Record		Athlete	Location	Date
Africa	37.91	WR	(Tunisia) Raoua Tlili	(Japan) Tokyo	1 September 2021
America	30.27		(Ecuador) Estefany Lopez	(France) Paris	14 July 2023
Asia	27.53		(China) Li Wei	(China) Beijing	11 May 2019
Europe	32.67		(Republic of Ireland) Niamh McCarthy	(France) Paris	14 June 2018
Oceania	23.27		(Australia) Claire Keefer	(Brazil) Rio de Janeiro	15 September 2016

==== Results ====
The final in this classification took place on 4 September 2024, at 10:00:

Rank	Athlete	Nationality	Class	1	2	3	4	5	6	Best	Notes
1st place, gold medalist(s)	Raoua Tlili	Tunisia	F41	34.52	36.55	34.41	32.97	x	x	36.55	SB
2nd place, silver medalist(s)	Youssra Karim	Morocco	F41	35.92	x	34.18	33.36	34.93	36.46	36.46	
3rd place, bronze medalist(s)	Estefany Lopez	Ecuador	F41	28.76	x	30.89	25.62	30.59	29.55	30.89	AR
4	Hayat El Garaa	Morocco	F41	28.82	29.28	x	29.49	29.67	29.74	29.74	
5	Samar Ben Koelleb	Tunisia	F41	28.63	27.12	27.73	26.74	27.57	27.97	28.63	PB
6	Charlotte Bolton	Canada	F41	24.31	28.53	26.55	x	x	27.04	28.53	
7	Antonella Ruiz Diaz	Argentina	F41	28.38	27.13	28.16	x	x	x	28.38	
8	Fathia Amaimia	Tunisia	F41	x	25.59	25.95	27.37	26.55	x	27.37	
9	Kubaro Khakimova	Uzbekistan	F41	21.59	x	25.19				25.19	SB
10	Renata Śliwińska	Poland	F40	23.61	x	21.62				23.61	
11	Madina Mukhtorova	Uzbekistan	F41	19.77	19.41	18.70				19.77	PB
12	Maryam Alzeyoudi	United Arab Emirates	F40	17.45	16.99	x				17.45	
—	Mayerli Buitrago Ariza	Colombia	F41							—	DNS

=== F53 ===
Prior to the competition, the existing records were as follows:

World Record	Elizabeth Rodrigues Gomes (BRA)	18.45	(Brazil) São Paulo	29 June 2024
Paralympic Record	Iana Lebiedieva (UKR)	15.48	(Japan) Tokyo	30 August 2021

Area	Record		Athlete	Location	Date
Africa	11.67		(Tunisia) Bochra Rzouga	(Tunisia) Tunis	18 March 2021
America	18.45	WR	(Brazil) Elizabeth Rodrigues Gomes	(Brazil) São Paulo	29 June 2024
Asia	14.49		(Japan) Keiko Onidani	(Japan) Kobe	20 May 2024
Europe	16.26		(Ukraine) Iana Lebiedieva	(United Arab Emirates) Dubai	14 November 2019
Oceania	14.46		(New Zealand) Cristeen Smith	(United Kingdom) Stoke Mandeville	26 July 1995

==== Results ====
The final in this classification took place on 2 September 2024, at 19:04:

Rank	Athlete	Nationality	Class	1	2	3	4	5	6	Best	Notes
1st place, gold medalist(s)	Elizabeth Rodrigues Gomes	Brazil	F53	13.42	15.73	16.75	14.27	17.37	17.05	17.37	PR
2nd place, silver medalist(s)	Keiko Onidani	Japan	F53	15.69	15.78	15.09	15.07	14.64	15.15	15.78	AR
3rd place, bronze medalist(s)	Zoia Ovsii	Ukraine	F51	13.63	13.58	14.06	13.54	14.17	13.33	14.17	SB
4	Cassie Mitchell	United States	F51	12.62	13.81	11.73	13.99	x	12.46	13.99	
5	Elena Gorlova	Neutral Paralympic Athletes	F51	11.63	12.34	12.15	12.24	12.19	12.44	12.44	
6	Leticia Ochoa Delgado	Mexico	F52	10.92	10.46	10.27	10.84	10.85	x	10.92	SB
7	Kanchan Lakhani	India	F53	9.81	9.70	9.92	9.43	9.71	10.06	10.06	PB
8	María Salas	Mexico	F53	x	x	9.44	9.62	10.02	9.91	10.02	

=== F55 ===
==== Records ====
Prior to the competition, the existing records were as follows:

World Record	Marianne Buggenhagen (GER)	27.80	(China) Beijing	9 September 2008
Paralympic Record	Marianne Buggenhagen (GER)	27.80	(China) Beijing	9 September 2008

Area	Record		Athlete	Location	Date
Africa	22.18		(Morocco) Norelhouda El Kaoui	(Japan) Kobe	17 May 2024
America	27.10		(Mexico) Rosa María Guerrero	(France) Paris	10 June 2022
Asia	26.64		(China) Dong Feixia	(Japan) Tokyo	27 August 2021
Europe	27.80	WR	(Germany) Marianne Buggenhagen	(China) Beijing	9 September 2008
Oceania	15.29	Record Mark			

==== Results ====
The final in this classification took place on 30 August 2024, at 10:00:

Rank	Athlete	Nationality	Class	1	2	3	4	5	6	Best	Notes
1st place, gold medalist(s)	Érica Castaño	Colombia	F55	24.45	26.70	25.59	24.96	26.04	25.06	26.70	
2nd place, silver medalist(s)	Dong Feixia	China	F55	24.08	24.39	26.39	26.08	26.10	26.67	26.67	AsR
3rd place, bronze medalist(s)	Rosa María Guerrero	Mexico	F55	24.99	25.22	25.81	25.05	19.49	24.93	25.81	SB
4	Diāna Krūmiņa	Latvia	F55	23.74	23.87	24.31	20.63	22.83	X	24.31	
5	Norelhouda El Kaoui	Morocco	F55	23.42	22.71	22.39	X	22.91	21.98	23.42	AfR
6	Rooba Al-Omari	Bahrain	F55	21.99	22.05	22.14	22.95	22.77	23.24	23.24	
7	María Navarro	Mexico	F55	X	21.51	X	21.35	21.66	20.52	21.66	
8	Sakshi Kasana	India	F55	19.55	X	X	19.15	21.49	19.76	21.49	SB
9	Karamjyoti Dalal	India	F55	X	18.78	17.87	17.67	20.04	20.22	20.22	SB
10	Korotoumou Coulibaly	Mali	F55	14.78	16.91	17.40	18.57	18.41	12.48	18.57	
11	Nurkhon Kurbanova	Uzbekistan	F55	15.33	17.01	16.69	16.46	16.71	17.26	17.26	SB
12	Natalya Semyonova	Uzbekistan	F55	X	11.70	13.48	11.96	X	11.86	13.48	SB
—	Iveth Valdes Romero	Panama	F55							—	DNS

=== F57 ===
==== Records ====
Prior to the competition, the existing records were as follows:

World Record	Nassima Saifi (ALG)	35.76	(United Arab Emirates) Dubai	9 November 2019
Paralympic Record	Nassima Saifi (ALG)	33.33	(Brazil) Rio de Janeiro	15 September 2016

Area	Record		Athlete	Location	Date
Africa	35.76	WR	(Algeria) Nassima Saifi	(United Arab Emirates) Dubai	9 November 2019
America	30.49		(Mexico) Floralia Estrada Bernal	(France) Paris	10 July 2023
Asia	33.28		(Uzbekistan) Mokhigul Khamdamova	(Japan) Kobe	18 May 2024
Europe	31.88	Record mark			
Oceania	15.35		(Australia) Julie Charlton	South Australia	17 April 2021

==== Results ====
This event had a partial qualification event. The four highest finishers qualified for the final.

Rank	Athlete	Nationality	Class	1	2	3	Best	Notes
1	Julyana Cristina da Silva	Brazil	F57	24.75	r		24.75	q
2	Ekaterina Vetokhina	Neutral Paralympic Athletes	F57	x	24.52	x	24.52	q
3	Zinabu Issah	Ghana	F57	19.3	24.39	x	24.39	q
4	Arlette Mawe Fokoa	Cameroon	F57	21.74	21.25	21.87	21.87	q
5	Miroslava Obrova	Czech Republic	F57	17.41	16.7	17.07	17.41	
6	Audrey Mengue Pambo	Gabon	F57	12.28	12.37	x	12.37	PB

The final in this classification took place on 31 August 2024, at 10:00. The four qualifiers joined the highest ranked eight athletes.

Rank	Athlete	Nationality	Class	1	2	3	4	5	6	Best	Notes
1st place, gold medalist(s)	Nassima Saifi	Algeria	F57	35.55	31.73	33.14	34.20	32.81	35.00	35.55	PR
2nd place, silver medalist(s)	Xu Mian	China	F57	31.26	31.98	X	31.90	32.81	X	32.81	PB
3rd place, bronze medalist(s)	Mokhigul Khamdamova	Uzbekistan	F57	32.13	32.75	31.63	30.51	28.24	30.20	32.75	
4	Stela Eneva	Bulgaria	F57	30.22	30.59	30.13	29.48	28.67	29.89	30.59	SB
5	Tian Yuxin	China	F57	28.96	29.99	30.48	29.98	29.87	30.48	30.48	PB
6	Yeniffer Paredes	Colombia	F57	28.42	18.95	X	28.76	30.12	28.99	30.12	PB
7	Floralia Estrada Bernal	Mexico	F57	29.66	28.64	29.82	29.31	28.95	28.97	29.82	
8	Safia Djelal	Algeria	F57	X	26.47	29.17	X	X	28.75	29.17	
9	Julyana Cristina da Silva	Brazil	F57	24.11	24.02	25.97	19.80	25.16	22.36	25.97	
10	Ekaterina Vetokhina	Neutral Paralympic Athletes	F57	22.21	24.42	23.82	X	23.47	X	24.42	
11	Arlette Mawe Fokoa	Cameroon	F57	23.03	23.53	21.44	23.94	23.52	23.76	23.94	
12	Zinabu Issah	Ghana	F57	23.16	23.14	X	22.52	23.69	23.85	23.85	

=== F64 ===
==== Records ====
Prior to the competition, the existing records were as follows:

World Record	Faustyna Kotłowska (POL)	41.17	(Poland) Warsaw	17 August 2024
Paralympic Record	Jessica Heims (USA)	34.89	(Japan) Tokyo	29 August 2021

Area	Record		Athlete	Location	Date
Africa	27.09		(South Africa) Maria Combrink	(South Africa) Stellenbosch	20 March 2019
America	40.79		(United States) Jessica Heims	(United States) Arizona	31 May 2024
Asia	24.22		(Japan) Juri Maeda	(Japan) Kyoto	14 May 2022
Europe	41.17	WR	(Poland) Faustyna Kotłowska	(Poland) Warsaw	17 August 2024
Oceania	Vacant				

==== Results ====
The final in this classification took place on 1 September 2024, at 10:47:

Rank	Athlete	Nationality	Class	1	2	3	4	5	6	Best	Notes
1st place, gold medalist(s)	Yang Yue	China	F44	40.50	42.39	41.09	x	x	40.84	42.39	SB
2nd place, silver medalist(s)	Yao Juan	China	F44	41.07	x	x	x	41.98	41.92	41.98	
3rd place, bronze medalist(s)	Osiris Machado	Mexico	F44	34.66	40.01	x	39.94	39.72	x	40.01	
4	Faustyna Kotłowska	Poland	F64	35.96	38.79	39.89	x	38.91	x	39.89	PR
5	Samantha Heyison	United States	F44	33.12	34.93	37.73	36.10	37.61	38.78	38.78	
6	Jessica Heims	United States	F64	x	34.01	32.02	34.59	34.23	34.68	34.68	
7	Sarah Edmiston	Australia	F44	32.33	33.42	32.47	34.33	32.92	30.51	34.33	SB
8	Funmi Oduwaiye	Great Britain	F44	x	32.00	33.29	30.24	33.32	x	33.32	
9	Ida Yessica Nesse	Norway	F44	30.35	x	32.73				32.73	
10	Arelle Middleton	United States	F44	x	30.38	30.19				30.38	
11	Litsitso Khotlele	Lesotho	F44	17.80	23.12	23.32				23.32	SB
—	Yané Van Der Merwe	South Africa	F44							NM	
