= 2023 World Para Athletics Championships – Women's discus throw =

The women's discus throw events at the 2023 World Para Athletics Championships were held at Charlety Stadium, Paris, France, from 9 to 17 July.

== Medalists ==
| Event | Gold | Silver | Bronze |
|---|---|---|---|
| F11 | Zhang Liangmin; China | Xue Enhui; China | Assunta Legnante; Italy |
| F38 | Simoné Kruger; South Africa | Renee Danielle Foessel; Canada | Mi Na; China |
| F41 | Raoua Tlili; Tunisia | Youssra Karim; Morocco | Estefany López; Ecuador |
| F53 | Elizabeth Rodrigues; Brazil | Cassie Mitchell; United States | Zoia Ovsii; Ukraine |
| F55 | Rosa María Guerrero; Mexico | Érica Castaño; Colombia | Diana Krumina; Latvia |
| F57 | Nassima Saifi; Algeria | Mokhigul Khamdamova; Uzbekistan | Floralia Estrada; Mexico |
| F64 | Yao Juan; China | Faustyna Kotłowska; Poland | Samantha Heyison; United States |

== Results ==
=== F11 ===
The final of the Women's Discus Throw F11 took place at 10:04 on 13 Jul 2023.

| Rank | Athlete | Attempt | | | | | | Result | Notes |
| Rank | Athlete | 1 | 2 | 3 | 4 | 5 | 6 | Result | Notes |
|---|---|---|---|---|---|---|---|---|---|
| 1st place, gold medalist(s) | Zhang Liangmin (CHN) | 36.64 | 38 | 36.93 | 38.57 | 36.75 | 37.75 | 38.57 | |
| 2nd place, silver medalist(s) | Xue Enhui (CHN) | X | 37.13 | 36.49 | 37.74 | X | 37.51 | 37.74 | |
| 3rd place, bronze medalist(s) | Assunta Legnante (ITA) | 36.52 | 33.5 | 33.07 | X | X | 28.77 | 36.52 | SB |
| 4 | Yesenia Restrepo (COL) | 33.94 | X | X | 29.94 | 33.24 | X | 33.94 | |
| 5 | Oksana Dobrovolskaja (LTU) | 29.46 | 31.32 | 30.50 | 29.32 | 33.48 | 28.98 | 33.48 | PB |
| 6 | Izabela Campos (BRA) | X | X | 32.02 | X | X | X | 32.02 | |
| 7 | Busra Nur Tirikli (TUR) | 24.08 | X | X | X | X | X | 24.08 | |

=== F38 ===
The final of the Women's Discus Throw F38 took place on 17 Jul 2023.

| Rank | Athlete | Attempt | | | | | | Result | Notes |
| Rank | Athlete | 1 | 2 | 3 | 4 | 5 | 6 | Result | Notes |
|---|---|---|---|---|---|---|---|---|---|
| 1st place, gold medalist(s) | Simoné Kruger (RSA) | 35.64 | X | 37.87 | X | X | 38.1 | 38.1 | WR |
| 2nd place, silver medalist(s) | Renee Danielle Foessel (CAN) | 35.42 | 33.98 | 34.61 | 37.01 | 34.64 | X | 37.01 | SB |
| 3rd place, bronze medalist(s) | Mi Na (CHN) | 35.24 | X | 33.3 | 34.05 | 35.77 | 35.53 | 35.77 | |
| 4 | Li Yingli (CHN) | 34.08 | 34.53 | X | X | 33.56 | 33.57 | 34.53 | SB |
| 5 | Samantha Schmidt (AUS) | 30.12 | 31.63 | 34.02 | X | 32.21 | 28.08 | 34.02 | AR |
| 6 | Katty Hurtado (COL) | 28.55 | 24.18 | 26.46 | 31.67 | 33.12 | 33.53 | 33.53 | PB |
| 7 | Rosa Carolina Castro (MEX) | X | X | 32.61 | 30.45 | 33.21 | 32.7 | 33.21 | |
| 8 | Ivana Purkic (CRO) | 28.7 | | X | X | 27.04 | X | 28.7 | PB |
| 9 | Jennifer Brown (CAN) | 25.18 | x | 24.75 | —N/a | | | 25.18 | |
| 10 | Ella Hose (AUS) | 24.62 | x | 24.72 | —N/a | | | 24.72 | |
| 11 | Ramune Adomaitiene (LTU) | X | 19.38 | 23.59 | —N/a | | | 23.59 | |
| 12 | Eva Datinska (CZE) | X | 23.22 | X | —N/a | | | 23.22 | |
| 13 | Karen Tassi Sanchez (ARG) | 19.82 | x | 20.67 | —N/a | | | 20.67 | SB |

=== F41 ===
The final of the Women's Discus Throw F41 took place at 9:04 on 14 Jul 2023.

| Rank | Athlete | Attempt | | | | | | Result | Notes |
| Rank | Athlete | 1 | 2 | 3 | 4 | 5 | 6 | Result | Notes |
|---|---|---|---|---|---|---|---|---|---|
| 1st place, gold medalist(s) | Raoua Tlili (TUN) | 37.00 | X | 35.04 | | 35.4 | 36.73 | 37.00 | CR |
| 2nd place, silver medalist(s) | Youssra Karim (MAR) | 32.70 | 34.63 | 35.42 | 32.81 | X | 34.79 | 35.42 | |
| 3rd place, bronze medalist(s) | Estefany Lopez (ECU) | 19.73 | 25.63 | X 30.27 | | X | 20.46 | 30.27 | AR |
| 4 | Hayat El Garaa (MAR) | X | 28.94 | 30.15 | 29.69 | X | 29.62 | 30.15 | SB |
| 5 | Antonella Ruiz Diaz (ARG) | 25.12 | 27.82 | 26.45 | X | X | 27.77 | 27.82 | |
| 6 | Samar Ben Koelleb (TUN) | 24.88 | 25.73 | 25.85 | 26.47 | 27.43 | 27.19 | 27.43 | |
| 7 | Renata Sliwinska (POL) | X | 23.17 | 24.62 | 23.28 | 24.73 | 22.67 | 24.73 | CR |
| 8 | Charlotte Bolton (CAN) | X | 24.45 | 24.15 | 23.02 | 24.48 | 24.63 | 24.63 | |
| 9 | Saruultugs Dagvadorj (MGL) | 20.04 | 19.72 | 16 | | | | 20.04 | SB |
| 10 | Maryam Alzeyoudi (UAE) | 19.69 | 19.04 | 19.07 | | | | 19.69 | |

=== F53 ===
The final of the Women's Discus Throw F53 took place at 18:30 on 12 Jul 2023.

| Rank | Athlete | Attempt | | | | | | Result | Notes |
| Rank | Athlete | 1 | 2 | 3 | 4 | 5 | 6 | Result | Notes |
|---|---|---|---|---|---|---|---|---|---|
| 1 | Elizabeth Rodrigues (BRA) | 16.71 | 17.12 | 17.12 | 16.26 | 16.29 | 15.16 | 17.12 | WR |
| 2 | Cassie Mitchell (USA) | 12.87 | 13.13 | 11.91 | 14.24 | 13.76 | 13.11 | 14.24 | CR |
| 3 | Zoia Ovsii (UKR) | 13.24 | 12.26 | 14.10 | 13.20 | 13.76 | 13.65 | 14.10 | SB |
| 4 | Aghdas Elnaz Darabian (IRI) | 13.41 | 11.41 | 12.18 | 12.21 | 12.96 | 13.48 | 13.48 | |
| 5 | Leticia OchoaDelgado (MEX) | 10.94 | 11.04 | 11.00 | 10.94 | 10.98 | 11.11 | 11.11 | |
| 6 | Kanchan Lakhani (IND) | 9.45 | 9.59 | 9.79 | 9.95 | 9.81 | 9.97 | 9.97 | PB |
| 7 | Ekta Bhyan (IND) | 5.95 | 5.78 | 6.44 | 6.10 | 5.44 | 6.55 | 6.55 | AR |

=== F55 ===
The event took place on 9 July.

| Rank | Athlete | Result | Notes |
|---|---|---|---|
| 1st place, gold medalist(s) | Rosa María Guerrero (MEX) | 26.12 | |
| 2nd place, silver medalist(s) | Érica Castaño (COL) | 25.70 | PB |
| 3rd place, bronze medalist(s) | Diana Krumina (LAT) | 24.63 | SB |
| 4 | Dong Feixia (CHN) | 24.47 | SB |
| 5 | Rooba Alomari (BHN) | 23.69 | PB |
| 6 | Sakshi Kasana (IND) | 21.73 | PB |
| 7 | Norelhouda El Kaoui (MAR) | 21.31 | AR |
| 8 | Sarah Mickey (CAN) | 21.14 | |
| 9 | Karam Jyoti (IND) | 18.76 | |
| 10 | Nurkhon Kurbanova (UZB) | 18.34 | SB |
| 11 | Pooja (IND) | 16.67 | |
| 12 | Lin Sitong (CHN) | 16.37 | SB |

=== F57 ===
The event took place on 10 July.

| Rank | Athlete | Result | Notes |
|---|---|---|---|
| 1st place, gold medalist(s) | Nassima Saifi (ALG) | 34.22 | SB |
| 2nd place, silver medalist(s) | Mokhigul Khamdamova (UZB) | 30.51 | SB |
| 3rd place, bronze medalist(s) | Floralia Estrada (MEX) | 30.49 | AR |
| 4 | Xu Mian (CHN) | 30.43 | |
| 5 | Safia Djelal (ALG) | 30.23 | SB |
| 6 | Yeniffer Paredes (COL) | 28.34 | SB |
| 7 | Arlette Mawe Fokoa (CMR) | 25.61 | SB |
| 8 | Maria de los Angeles Ortiz (MEX) | 23.39 | PB |
| 9 | Myadagmaa Tumursuren (MGL) | 21.35 | |
| 10 | Miroslava Obrova (CZE) | 19.46 | SB |
| 11 | Gilda Guadalupe Cota (MEX) | 13.42 | |

=== F64/44 ===
The final of the Women's Discus Throw F64 took place at 9:04 on 11 Jul 2023.

| Rank | Athlete | Attempt | | | | | | Result | Notes |
| Rank | Athlete | 1 | 2 | 3 | 4 | 5 | 6 | Result | Notes |
|---|---|---|---|---|---|---|---|---|---|
| 1st place, gold medalist(s) | Yao Juan (CHN) | 41.66 | 41.22 | X | X | X | X | 41.66 | SB |
| 2nd place, silver medalist(s) | Faustyna Kotlowska (POL) | 34.35 | 36.84 | X | 38.58 | 37.9 | 35.5 | 38.58 | SB |
| 3rd place, bronze medalist(s) | Samantha Heyison (USA) | 33.03 | 36.02 | X | 32.9 | 35.6 | 37.84 | 37.84 | |
| 4 | Sarah Edmiston (AUS) | X | 35.11 | X | X | 34.67 | 34.45 | 35.11 | |
| 5 | Osiris Aneth Machado (MEX) | X | 32.99 | X | 29.06 | X | X | 32.99 | |
| 6 | Funmi Oduwaiye (GBR) | 32.79 | X | 32.11 | X | X | X | 32.79 | PB |
| 7 | Noraivis De Las Heras (CUB) | X | 25.85 | 27.12 | 28.49 | 26.67 | X | 28.49 | SB |
| 8 | Yane Van Der Merwe (RSA) | X | X | 27.59 | 28.33 | 27.06 | X | 28.33 | |
| 9 | Sylvia Atieno Olero (KEN) | 25.79 | 24.66 | X | —N/a | | | 25.79 | |
| 10 | Regina Edward (PNG) | 18.69 | 20.62 | X | —N/a | | | 20.62 | |
| 11 | Florentina Hriscu (ROU) | X | X | 17.04 | —N/a | | | 17.04 | |
