= Athletics at the 2020 Summer Paralympics – Women's discus throw =

The Women's discus throw athletics events for the 2020 Summer Paralympics took place at the Tokyo National Stadium from August 27 to September 4, 2021. A total of 7 events were contested in this discipline.

== Schedule ==
R	Round 1	½	Semifinals	F	Final

Date	Fri 27		Sat 28		Sun 29		Mon 30		Tue 31		Wed 1		Thu 2		Fri 3		Sat 4	
Event	M	E	M	E	M	E	M	E	M	E	M	E	M	E	M	E	M	E
F11									F									
F38																		F
F41											F							
F53								F										
F55	F																	
F57			F															
F64					F													

== Medal summary ==
The following is a summary of the medals awarded across all discus throw events.

Classification	Gold		Silver		Bronze	
F11	Zhang Liangmin; China	40.83 WR	Assunta Legnante; Italy	40.25 AR	Yesenia Restrepo; Colombia	36.11
F38	Mi Na; China	38.50 WR (F37)	Li Yingli; China	33.73	Rosa Carolina Castro Castro; Mexico	33.73 GR
F41	Raoua Tlili; Tunisia	37.91 WR	Youssra Karim; Morocco	37.35	Hayat El Garaa; Morocco	29.30
F53	Elizabeth Rodrigues Gomes; Brazil	17.62 WR (F52)	Iana Lebiedieva; Ukraine	15.48 GR	Zoia Ovsii; Ukraine	14.37 GR (F51)
F55	Dong Feixia; China	26.64 AR	Diāna Dadzīte; Latvia	25.02	Rosa María Guerrero; Mexico	24.11
F57	Mokhigul Khamdamova; Uzbekistan	31.46	Nassima Saifi; Algeria	30.81	Julyana Cristina da Silva; Brazil	30.49 AR
F64	Yao Juan; China	44.73 WR	Yang Yue; China	40.48 SB	Sarah Edmiston; Australia	37.85 AR

== Results ==
=== F11 ===
Records

Prior to this competition, the existing world, Paralympic, and area records were as follows:

World record	Zhang Liangmin (CHN)	40.42	Christchurch, New Zealand	22 January 2011
Paralympic record	Zhang Liangmin (CHN)	40.13	London, United Kingdom	1 September 2012

Area	Distance (m)	Athlete	Nation
Africa	Vacant		
Americas	38.66	Lisa Banta	United States
Asia	40.42 WR	Zhang Liangmin	China
Europe	37.89	Assunta Legnante	Italy
Oceania	15.42	Alailupe Valeti	Tonga

Results

The final in this classification took place on 31 August 2021, at 9:34:

Rank	Athlete	Nationality	1	2	3	4	5	6	Best	Notes
1st place, gold medalist(s)	Zhang Liangmin	China	38.62	-	40.83	x	39.19	39.79	40.83	WR
2nd place, silver medalist(s)	Assunta Legnante	Italy	37.62	39.53	x	x	x	40.25	40.25	AR
3rd place, bronze medalist(s)	Yesenia Restrepo	Colombia	30.95	33.29	34.85	34.55	32.73	32.73	36.11	
4	Tang Hongxia	China	31.27	33.46	x	31.00	x	31.09	33.46	SB
5	Elena Shakh	RPC	32.80	30.29	31.24	x	4.88	5.76	32.80	
6	Büşra Nur Tırıklı	Turkey	32.70	31.40	27.27	29.14	31.15	x	32.70	
7	Izabela Campos	Brazil	32.26	x	x	31.17	x	x	32.26	
8	Oksana Dobrovolskaja	Lithuania	x	29.50	29.30	22.26	x	x	29.50	
9	Florencia Belen Romero	Argentina	x	x	29.07	Did not advance			29.07	

=== F38 ===
Records

Prior to this competition, the existing world, Paralympic, and area records were as follows:

World record	Renee Foessel (CAN)	37.83	Guelph, Canada	16 June 2021
Paralympic record	Noelle Lenihan (IRL)	31.71	Rio de Janeiro, Brazil	17 September 2016

Area	Distance (m)	Athlete	Nation
Africa	33.91	Simoné Kruger	South Africa
Americas	37.83 WR	Renee Foessel	Canada
Asia	Vacant		
Europe	32.95	Noelle Lenihan	Ireland
Oceania	33.66	Samantha Schmidt	Australia

Results

The final in this classification took place on 4 September 2021, at 19:35:

Rank	Athlete	Nationality	Class	1	2	3	4	5	6	Best	Notes
1st place, gold medalist(s)	Mi Na	China	F37	37.36	37.49	37.66	38.50	36.36	–	38.50	WR (F37)
2nd place, silver medalist(s)	Li Yingli	China	F37	x	x	31.02	33.73	33.70	28.45	33.73	SB
3rd place, bronze medalist(s)	Rosa Carolina Castro Castro	Mexico	F38	25.22	28.58	32.07	32.21	33.73	31.23	33.73	GR
4	Renee Foessel	Canada	F38	32.23	28.99	30.15	31.69	x	x	32.23	
5	Simoné Kruger	South Africa	F38	x	x	26.52	31.51	30.30	x	31.51	
6	Samantha Schmidt	Australia	F38	x	30.26	27.73	x	29.35	x	30.26	
7	Lisa Adams	New Zealand	F37	x	29.69	29.22	28.80	x	x	29.69	
8	Jenn Brown	Canada	F38	x	27.57	27.18	x	x	27.18	27.57	
9	Eva Datinska	Czech Republic	F37	x	21.31	x	Did not advance			21.31	

=== F41 ===
Records

Prior to this competition, the existing world, Paralympic, and area records were as follows:

World record	Youssra Karim (MAR)	35.33	Tunis, Tunisia	20 March 2021
Paralympic record	Raoua Tlili (TUN)	33.38	Rio de Janeiro, Brazil	15 September 2016

Area	Distance (m)	Athlete	Nation
Africa	35.33 WR	Youssra Karim	Morocco
Americas	25.80	Antonella Ruiz Diaz	Argentina
Asia	27.53	Li Wei	China
Europe	32.67	Niamh McCarthy	Ireland
Oceania	23.27	Claire Keefer	Australia

Results

The final in this classification took place on 1 September 2021, at 9:35:

Rank	Athlete	Nationality	Class	1	2	3	4	5	6	Best	Notes
1st place, gold medalist(s)	Raoua Tlili	Tunisia	F41	30.05	35.58	35.29	37.13	x	37.91	37.91	WR
2nd place, silver medalist(s)	Youssra Karim	Morocco	F41	x	34.49	37.35	35.80	x	x	37.35	SB
3rd place, bronze medalist(s)	Hayat El Garaa	Morocco	F41	28.22	x	29.28	29.30	28.83	x	29.30	
4	Fathia Amaimia	Tunisia	F41	28.09	26.52	28.23	29.04	28.67	28.54	29.04	PB
5	Niamh McCarthy	Ireland	F41	28.59	5.32	x	28.52	x	28.94	28.94	
6	Charlotte Bolton	Canada	F41	26.50	27.72	25.21	x	x	x	27.72	AR
7	Samar Ben Koelleb	Tunisia	F41	x	25.52	25.87	26.02	x	x	26.02	SB
8	Renata Śliwińska	Poland	F40	22.35	x	24.25	24.70	22.86	23.59	24.70	PR
9	Antonella Ruiz Diaz	Argentina	F41	x	x	21.42	Did not advance			21.42	
10	Claudine Uwitije	Rwanda	F41	19.28	19.66	18.49	Did not advance			19.66	PB
11	Marijana Goranović	Montenegro	F41	16.22	x	x	Did not advance			16.22	
	Saruultugs Dagvadorj	Mongolia	F40							DNS	
	Maryam Alzeyoudi	United Arab Emirates	F40							DNS	

=== F53 ===
Records

Prior to this competition, the existing world, Paralympic, and area records were as follows:

World record	Iana Lebiedieva (UKR)	16.26	Dubai, United Arab Emirates	14 November 2019
Paralympic record	Maria Salas (MEX)	12.59	Beijing, China	10 September 2008

Area	Distance (m)	Athlete	Nation
Africa	11.67	Bochra Rzouga	Tunisia
America	13.18	Sônia Gouveia	Brazil
Asia	10.95	Fatema Nedham	Bahrain
Europe	16.26 WR	Iana Lebiedieva	Ukraine
Oceania	14.46	Cristeen Smith	New Zealand

Results

The final in this classification took place on 30 August 2021, at 19:10:

Rank	Athlete	Nationality	Class	1	2	3	4	5	6	Best	Notes
1st place, gold medalist(s)	Elizabeth Rodrigues Gomes	Brazil	F52	15.68	16.35	x	x	17.33	17.62	17.62	WR (F52)
2nd place, silver medalist(s)	Iana Lebiedieva	Ukraine	F53	x	x	x	13.17	14.35	15.48	15.48	GR (F53)
3rd place, bronze medalist(s)	Zoia Ovsii	Ukraine	F51	14.11	11.80	13.67	14.37	13.68	14.01	14.37	GR (F51)
4	Cassie Mitchell	United States	F51	x	14.16	13.20	x	13.88	13.50	14.16	
5	Elena Gorlova	RPC	F51	x	12.77	12.79	12.49	x	12.71	12.79	SB
6	Elnaz Darabian Aghdas	Iran	F53	10.79	12.34	11.30	12.28	12.37	12.49	12.49	AR
7	Leticia Ochoa Delgado	Mexico	F52	x	11.56	11.44	11.38	11.58	11.46	11.58	
8	Maria Salas	Mexico	F53	11.00	x	10.63	x	9.99	x	11.00	SB
9	Bochra Rzouga	Tunisia	F53	10.68	x	10.76	10.52	10.42	10.77	10.77	

=== F55 ===
Records

Prior to this competition, the existing world, Paralympic, and area records were as follows:

World record	Marianne Buggenhagen (GER)	27.80	Beijing, China	9 September 2008
Paralympic record	Marianne Buggenhagen (GER)	27.80	Beijing, China	9 September 2008

Area	Distance (m)	Athlete	Nation
Africa	17.38	Korotoumou Coulibaly	Mali
America	26.22	Rosa María Guerrero	Mexico
Asia	26.22	Dong Feixia	China
Europe	27.80 WR	Marianne Buggenhagen	Germany
Oceania	15.29	Record Mark	

Results

The final in this classification took place on 27 August 2021, at 10:19:

Rank	Athlete	Nationality	Class	1	2	3	4	5	6	Best	Notes
1st place, gold medalist(s)	Dong Feixia	China	F55	26.64	26.13	25.74	24.98	25.53	26.24	26.64	AR
2nd place, silver medalist(s)	Diāna Dadzīte	Latvia	F55	23.01	23.40	22.31	23.10	24.05	25.02	25.02	PB
3rd place, bronze medalist(s)	Rosa María Guerrero	Mexico	F55	x	24.11	23.87	23.62	22.39	22.72	24.11	
4	Érica Castaño	Colombia	F55	23.98	22.65	21.89	23.04	23.09	23.28	23.98	PB
5	Rooba Alomari	Bahrain	F55	21.94	22.15	23.11	21.50	22.34	21.70	23.11	PB
6	Sarah Mickey	Canada	F55	20.39	21.34	x	22.03	21.59	22.49	22.49	
7	Belen Montserrat Sanchez Dominguez	Mexico	F55	20.59	19.67	21.11	21.05	21.32	20.84	21.32	SB
8	Nurkhon Kurbanova	Uzbekistan	F54	19.18	20.36	19.63	18.55	x	20.40	20.40	WR
9	Korotoumou Coulibaly	Mali	F55	x	18.64	18.35	17.73	17.68	17.12	18.64	AR
10	Francisca Mardones Sepulveda	Chile	F54	18.53	17.89	17.38	15.94	18.31	17.05	18.53	SB
	Nataliia Chebakova	RPC	F55	x	x	x	x	x	x	NM	

=== F57 ===
Records

Prior to this competition, the existing world, Paralympic, and area records were as follows:

World record	Nassima Saifi (ALG)	35.76	Dubai, United Arab Emirates	9 November 2019
Paralympic record	Nassima Saifi (ALG)	33.33	Rio de Janeiro, Brazil	15 September 2016

Area	Distance (m)	Athlete	Nation
Africa	35.76 WR	Nassima Saifi	Algeria
America	30.35	Floralia Estrada Bernal	Mexico
Asia	32.49	Mokhigul Khamdamova	Uzbekistan
Europe	31.88	Record Mark	
Oceania	15.35	Julie Charlton	Australia

Results

The final in this classification took place on 28 August 2021, at 9:30:

Rank	Athlete	Nationality	Class	1	2	3	4	5	6	Best	Notes
1st place, gold medalist(s)	Mokhigul Khamdamova	Uzbekistan	F57	31.46	30.82	x	30.95	31.28	29.50	31.46	
2nd place, silver medalist(s)	Nassima Saifi	Algeria	F57	x	x	26.52	x	30.81	x	30.81	
3rd place, bronze medalist(s)	Julyana Cristina da Silva	Brazil	F57	30.36	30.28	30.49	29.41	28.66	29.63	30.49	AR
4	Floralia Estrada Bernal	Mexico	F57	29.21	x	29.07	29.95	30.34	30.21	30.34	SB
5	Safia Djelal	Algeria	F57	28.26	28.67	29.47	x	14.84	27.07	29.47	SB
6	Grace Nwaozuzu	Nigeria	F57	27.29	28.00	28.21	x	29.26	29.10	29.26	
7	Xu Mian	China	F57	27.82	x	28.68	28.74	29.22	27.10	29.22	SB
8	Eucharia Iyiazi	Nigeria	F57	x	25.48	26.14	27.49	x	26.27	27.49	
9	Nguyễn Thị Hải	Vietnam	F57	25.88	26.68	26.04	27.39	26.72	26.38	27.39	SB
10	Sylvia Grant	Jamaica	F57	22.40	22.73	22.69	23.12	22.05	22.92	23.12	SB
11	Tuany Priscila Barbosa Siqueira	Brazil	F57	21.21	20.10	20.96	21.30	20.47	20.79	21.30	SB
12	Famini Famini	Indonesia	F56	x	21.13	20.76	x	20.92	x	21.13	SB

=== F64 ===
Records

Prior to this competition, the existing world, Paralympic, and area records were as follows:

World record	Faustyna Kotłowska (POL)	36.53	Kraków, Poland	22 August 2020
Paralympic record	Vacant	–		

Area	Distance (m)	Athlete	Nation
Africa	27.09	Maria Combrink	South Africa
America	34.40	Jessica Heims	United States
Asia	23.57	Juri Maeda	Japan
Europe	36.53 WR	Faustyna Kotłowska	Poland
Oceania	Vacant		

Results

The final in this classification took place on 29 August 2021, at 10:17:

Rank	Athlete	Nationality	Class	1	2	3	4	5	6	Best	Notes
1st place, gold medalist(s)	Yao Juan	China	F44	41.41	44.40	43.19	x	42.61	44.73	44.73	WR
2nd place, silver medalist(s)	Yang Yue	China	F44	40.48	x	39.93	40.08	39.35	x	40.48	SB
3rd place, bronze medalist(s)	Sarah Edmiston	Australia	F44	34.87	36.83	37.41	34.32	36.38	37.85	37.85	AR
4	Ida Yessica Nesse	Norway	F44	32.33	33.85	35.83	x	33.18	33.26	35.83	PB
5	Jessica Heims	United States	F64	32.84	34.42	32.24	34.89	34.07	33.04	34.89	AR
6	Kristel Walther	Denmark	F64	31.20	x	34.16	32.29	33.35	31.96	34.16	PB
7	Faustyna Kotłowska	Poland	F64	27.25	x	30.12	33.40	32.88	30.86	33.40	
8	Noralvis de Las Heras Chivas	Cuba	F44	29.62	27.22	x	x	29.24	30.62	30.62	SB
9	Litsitso Khotlele	Lesotho	F44	21.47	21.82	22.75	did not advance			22.75	PB
10	Anila Izzat Baig	Pakistan	F44	x	5.57	19.08	did not advance			19.08	SB
