= Athletics at the 2016 Summer Paralympics – Women's discus throw =

The women's discus throw athletics events for the 2016 Summer Paralympics took place at the Rio Olympic Stadium from 9 September. A total of 7 events were contested for 15 different classifications, the medal summary included over 7 different women.

== Medal summary ==
Classification	Gold		Silver		Bronze	
F11	Liangmin Zhang; China	36.65	Hongxia Tang; China	35.01	Izabela Campos; Brazil	32.60 PB
F38 (inc. F37)	Mi Na; China	37.60	Shirlene Coelho; Brazil	33.91	Noelle Lenihan; Ireland	31.71
F41 (inc. F40)	Raoua Tlili; Tunisia	33.38	Niamh McCarthy; Ireland	26.67	Fathia Amaimia; Tunisia	26.16
F44 (inc. F43)	Juan Yao; China	44.53 WR	Yue Yang; China	43.47 PB	Noraivis de la Heras Chibas; Cuba	32.47
F52 (inc. F51)	Rachael Morrison; United States	13.09 WR	Cassie Mitchell; United States	12.87 SB	Zoia Ovsii; Ukraine	12.17
F55 (inc. F54)	Dong Feixia; China	25.03	Marianne Buggenhagen; Germany	24.56	Diāna Dadzīte; Latvia	22.66
F57 (inc. F56)	Nassima Saifi; Algeria	33.33	Orla Barry; Ireland	30.06	Eucharia Iyiazi; Nigeria	27.54 SB

== Competition format ==
The competition for each classification consisted of a single round. Each athlete threw three times, after which the eight best threw three more times (with the best distance of the six throws counted).

== Results ==
=== F11 ===
The F11 event took place on 9 September.

Rank	Bib	Name	Nationality	Distance (m)	Notes
1st place, gold medalist(s)	183	Zhang Liangmin	China	36.65	
2nd place, silver medalist(s)	175	Tang Hongxia	China	35.01	
3rd place, bronze medalist(s)	97	Izabela Campos	Brazil	32.60	PB
4	451	Assunta Legnante	Italy	31.51	SB
5	218	Yesenia Maria Restrepo Munoz	Colombia	30.81	PB
6	143	Ness Murby	Canada	28.02	
7	23	Florencia Belen Romero	Argentina	25.69	PB
8	851	Busra Nur Tirikli	Turkey	25.65	
9	617	Ingrid Van Kranen	Netherlands	25.57	

=== F38/F37 ===
The F38/F37 event took place on 14 September.

Rank	Name	Nationality	Distance (m)	Notes
1st place, gold medalist(s)	Mi Na	China	37.60	WR
2nd place, silver medalist(s)	Shirlene Coelho	Brazil	33.91	
3rd place, bronze medalist(s)	Noelle Lenihan	Ireland	31.71	PR
4	Renee Danielle Foessel	Canada	30.70	
5	Beverley Jones	Great Britain	28.53	
6	Eva Berná	Czech Republic	28.30	
7	Jennifer Brown	Canada	27.95	
8	Rae Anderson	Australia	27.14	SB
9	Yomaira Cohen	Venezuela	26.79	
10	Jia Qianqian	China	26.65	
11	Taiga Kantane	Latvia	23.53	SB

=== F41 ===
The F41 event took place on 15 September.

Rank	Name	Nationality	Distance (m)	Notes
1st place, gold medalist(s)	Raoua Tlili	Tunisia	33.38	
2nd place, silver medalist(s)	Niamh McCarthy	Ireland	26.67	
3rd place, bronze medalist(s)	Fathia Amaimia	Tunisia	26.16	
4	Samar Ben Koelleb	Tunisia	25.79	
5	Hayat El Garaa	Morocco	25.72	
6	Renata Sliwinska	Poland	23.34	
7	Claire Keefer	Australia	23.27	
8	Holly Neill	Great Britain	23.13	
9	Marijana Goranovic	Montenegro	19.28	
10	Lara Baars	Netherlands	19.01	
11	Fenju Zhang	China	17.52	
12	Hasnaa Moubal	Morocco	17.20	
13	Karina Erika Loyola	Argentina	17.18	
14	Lauritta Onye	Nigeria		DNS

=== F44 ===
The F44 event took place on 11 September.

Rank	Name	Nationality	Distance (m)	Notes
1st place, gold medalist(s)	Juan Yao	China	44.53	WR
2nd place, silver medalist(s)	Yang Yue	China	43.47	PB
3rd place, bronze medalist(s)	Noraivis de la Heras Chibas	Cuba	32.47	
4	Frederike Charlotte Koleiski	Germany	30.34	
5	Mariem Soudani	Tunisia	29.68	
6	Natalie Bieule	United States	28.62	
7	Ida Nesse	Norway	27.08	
8	Jessica Heims	United States	25.98	
9	Kristel Walther	Denmark	25.15	
10	Litsitso Khotele	Lesotho	19.91	
11	Maggie Aiono	Samoa	19.56	
12	Florentina Hriscu	Romania	18.59	

=== F52 ===
The F52 event took place on 14 September.

Rank	Name	Nationality	Distance (m)	Notes
1st place, gold medalist(s)	Rachael Morrison	United States	13.09	WR
2nd place, silver medalist(s)	Cassie Mitchell	United States	12.87	
3rd place, bronze medalist(s)	Zoia Ovsii	Ukraine	12.17	
4	Leticia Ochoa Delgado	Mexico	10.85	
5	Joanna Butterfield	Great Britain	9.40	
6	Zena Cole	United States	4.98	

=== F55 ===
The F55 event took place on 17 September.

=== F57 ===
The F57 event took place on 15 September. The event incorporates athletes from classification F56 in addition to F57.
