= 2024 World Para Athletics Championships – Women's discus throw =

The women's discus throw events at the 2024 World Para Athletics Championships were held in Kobe.

== Medalists ==
Event	Gold	Silver	Bronze
F11	Xue Enhui; China	Zhang Liangmin; China	Izabela Campos; Brazil
F38	Simoné Kruger; South Africa	Mi Na; China	Li Yingli; China
F41	Youssra Karim; Morocco	Raoua Tlili; Tunisia	Estefany López; Ecuador
F53	Elizabeth Rodrigues Gomes; Brazil	Keiko Onidani; Japan	Elena Gorlova; Neutral Paralympic Athletes (NPA)
F55	Érica Castaño; Colombia	Dong Feixia; China	Rosa María Guerrero; Mexico
F57	Nguyễn Thị Hải; Vietnam	María de los Ángeles Ortiz; Mexico	Myadagmaa Tumursuren; Mongolia
F64	Yao Juan; China	Osiris Aneth Machado Plata; Mexico	Yang Yue; China
