= 2021 World Para Athletics European Championships – Women's discus throw =

The women's discus throw events were held at the 2021 World Para Athletics European Championships in Bydgoszcz, Poland.

== Medalists ==
Event	Gold		Silver		Bronze	
F11/F12	Büşra Nur Tırıklı (TUR)	34.12 CR (F11)	Elena Shakh (RUS)	33.12 PB (F11)	Orysia Ilchyna (UKR)	35.29 (F12)
F38	Eva Datinska (CZE)	26.78	Natalia Jasińska (POL)	24.62 PB	Emily Stewart (GBR)	24.41
F41	Niamh McCarthy (IRL)	30.03	Renata Śliwińska (POL)	24.77 WR	Lara Baars (NED)	24.19
F53	Iana Lebiedieva (UKR)	15.44 CR	Zoia Ovsii (UKR)	14.15 WR	Elena Gorlova (RUS)	12.18
F55	Karolina Strawinska (POL)	19.76	Ivana Petrovic (SRB)	19.54 PB	Iryna Baranovskaya (BLR)	18.26
F64	Faustyna Kotłowska (POL)	34.58 CR	Ida Yessica Nesse (NOR)	34.05	Kristel Walther (DEN)	31.38
WR world record | ER European record | CR championship record | NR national record | WL world leading | EL European leading | PB personal best | SB seasonal best

== See also ==
- List of IPC world records in athletics
