= Athletics at the 2023 Parapan American Games =

Athletics competitions at the 2023 Parapan American Games

- Athletics pictogram
- Venue: Centro Atlético Mario Recordón
- Dates: 21 – 25 November 2023
- No. of events: 68
- Competitors: 406 from 26 nations

Athletics competitions at the 2023 Parapan American Games in Santiago, Chile are held at the Mario Recordón Athletics Training Center (Centro Atlético Mario Recordón) within the Julio Martínez National Stadium from 21 to 25 November.

== Participating nations ==
There are 406 athletes from 26 nations participating in the games.

- Argentina (38)
- Bermuda (1)
- Brazil (60)
- Canada (16)
- Chile (13) (Host)
- Colombia (39)
- Costa Rica (7)
- Cuba (16)
- Dominican Republic (8)
- Ecuador (16)
- El Salvador (5)
- Grenada (2)
- Guatemala (5)
- Haiti (1)
- Honduras (1)
- Jamaica (2)
- Mexico (54)
- Nicaragua (2)
- Panama (11)
- Paraguay (1)
- Peru (10)
- Puerto Rico (5)
- Trinidad and Tobago (1)
- United States (58)
- Uruguay (2)
- Venezuela (32)

== Medal table ==
* Host nation (Chile)

Rank	NPC	Gold	Silver	Bronze	Total
1	Brazil (BRA)	34	27	22	83
2	Colombia (COL)	18	16	12	46
3	United States (USA)	16	22	16	54
4	Mexico (MEX)	12	14	12	38
5	Argentina (ARG)	9	9	15	33
6	Ecuador (ECU)	7	4	2	13
7	Cuba (CUB)	7	2	4	13
8	Venezuela (VEN)	5	10	11	26
9	Costa Rica (CRC)	2	1	0	3
10	Canada (CAN)	1	3	8	12
11	Chile (CHI)*	1	1	1	3
12	Bermuda (BER)	1	0	0	1
12	Trinidad and Tobago (TTO)	1	0	0	1
14	Peru (PER)	0	3	2	5
15	Dominican Republic (DOM)	0	2	2	4
16	Puerto Rico (PUR)	0	0	1	1
Totals (16 entries)		114	114	108	336

== Medalists ==
=== Men's events ===
Event	Class	Gold	Silver	Bronze
100 metres	T11	Enderson Santos; Venezuela	Daniel Silva; Brazil	Antoine Craig; United States
100 metres	T12	Fernando Vázquez; Argentina	Marcos Vinicius de Oliveira; Brazil	Pedro José Urgellés; Cuba
100 metres	T13	Fabrício Barros; Brazil	Jean Carlos Mina Aponzá; Colombia	Stirley Jones Jr. United States
100 metres	T35	Hernán Barreto; Argentina	Maximiliano Villa; Argentina	Fábio Bordignon; Brazil
100 metres	T36	Alexis Sebastian Chavez; Argentina	Aser Almeida; Brazil	Fabricio Lopez; Argentina
100 metres	T37	Ricardo Gomes de Mendonça; Brazil	Christian Gabriel Luiz; Brazil	Andrés Malambo; Colombia
100 metres	T38	Ryan Medrano; United States	Santiago Solís; Colombia	José Rodolfo Chessani; Mexico
100 metres	T47	Petrúcio Ferreira; Brazil	Washington Junior; Brazil	Raciel González; Cuba
100 metres	T52	Anthony Bouchard; Canada	Salvador Hernandez; Mexico	Cristian Eduardo Torres; Colombia
100 metres	T53	Ariosvaldo Fernandes; Brazil	Robert Hunt; United States	Phillip Croft; United States
100 metres	T54	Juan Cervantes; Mexico	Cristian Ribera; Brazil	Evan Correll; United States
100 metres	T64	Sherman Guity; Costa Rica	Jonathan Gore; United States	Zachary Blair; United States
200 metres	T35	Maximiliano Villa; Argentina	Hernán Barreto; Argentina	Fábio Bordignon; Brazil
200 metres	T37	Ricardo Gomes; Brazil	Christian Gabriel Luiz; Brazil	Andrés Malambo; Colombia
200 metres	T64	Sherman Guity; Costa Rica	Jesús Castillo; Peru	Andres Patiño; Colombia
400 metres	T11	Daniel Silva; Brazil	Enderson Santos; Venezuela	José de Jesus Flores; Mexico
400 metres	T12	Yamil Acosta; Colombia	Marcos Vinicius de Oliveira; Brazil	Richard González; Dominican Republic
400 metres	T13	Buinder Bermúdez; Colombia	Davi Wilker de Souza; Brazil	Yosmer Rojas; Venezuela
400 metres	T20	Samuel Oliveira; Brazil	Jhon Obando; Colombia	Luis Felipe Rodríguez; Venezuela
400 metres	T36	Alexis Sebastian Chavez; Argentina	Alan Zavala; Mexico	Fabricio Lopez; Argentina
400 metres	T37	Yeferson Suárez; Colombia	Andrés Malambo; Colombia	Carlos Rodriguez; Mexico
400 metres	T38	Ryan Medrano; United States	José Rodolfo Chessani; Mexico	Dixon Hooker; Colombia
400 metres	T47	Daniel Milanes; Cuba	Tahmar Upshaw; United States	Rayven Sample; United States
400 metres	T52	Leonardo de Jesús Perez; Mexico	Cristian Eduardo Torres; Colombia	Anthony Bouchard; Canada
400 metres	T53	Ariosvaldo Fernandes; Brazil	Phillip Croft; United States	Robert Hunt; United States
400 metres	T54	Juan Cervantes; Mexico	Cristian Ribera; Brazil	Evan Correll; United States
800 metres	T53/54	Fernando Sanchez; Mexico	Miguel Jimenez-Vergara; United States	Cristian Ribera; Brazil
1500 metres	T11	Júlio Cesar Agripino; Brazil	Rosbil Guillen; Peru	Alejandro Pacheco; Mexico
1500 metres	T13	Joel Gomez; United States	Sixto Moreta; Ecuador	Sivaldo de Souza; Brazil
1500 metres	T20	Samuel Guarín; Colombia	Michael Barber; Canada	Carmelo Rivera; Puerto Rico
1500 metres	T38	Leo Merle; United States	Liam Stanley; Canada	Jhonier Gómez; Colombia
1500 metres	T46	Mauricio Orrego; Chile	Tahmar Upshaw; United States	Bryan Muguicha; Ecuador
1500 metres	T54	Miguel Jimenez-Vergara; United States	Cristian Ribera; Brazil	Fernando Sanchez; Mexico
5000 metres	T11	Yeltsin Jacques; Brazil	Rosbil Guillen; Peru	Júlio Cesar Agripino; Brazil
5000 metres	T13	Sixto Moreta; Ecuador	Noah Scherf; United States	Sivaldo de Souza; Brazil
5000 metres	T54	Evan Correll; United States	Miguel Jimenez-Vergara; United States	Phillip Croft; United States
Long Jump	T13	Tyson Gunter; United States	Paulo Henrique Andrade; Brazil	Franco Pinetti; Argentina
Long Jump	T20	Jhon Obando; Colombia	Roberto Chala; Ecuador	Noah Vucsics; Canada
Long Jump	T36	Aser Almeida; Brazil	Rodrigo Parreira; Brazil	Sergio Markieviche; Argentina
Long Jump	T37/38	Brian Lionel Impellizzeri; Argentina	Juan Gómez Coa; Colombia	Jesse Zesseu; Canada
Long Jump	T47	Robiel Sol; Cuba	Alberto Piriz; Argentina	José Messu; Colombia
Shot Put	F11	Alessandro Rodrigo da Silva; Brazil	Wilmer Zambrano; Venezuela	Franklin Bracho; Venezuela
Shot Put	F12	Caio Vinicius da Silva; Brazil	Devin Huhta; United States	Antonio Rodas; Argentina
Shot Put	F20	Jordi Congo; Ecuador	Frank Yepez; Ecuador	Ronny Valdes; Venezuela
Shot Put	F32/33/34	Mauricio Valencia; Colombia	Diego Meneses; Colombia	Sebastian Poltrone; Argentina
Shot Put	F35/36/37	Jose Roman Ruiz; Mexico	Hernan Emanuel Urra; Argentina	Bryan Enriquez; Mexico
Shot Put	F40/41	Marco Churuchumbi; Ecuador	Heriberto Prieto; Venezuela	Andres Pinillos; Argentina
Shot Put	F46	Josh Cinnamo; United States	Edward Felipe Ortiz; Colombia	Juan Aznarez; Argentina
Shot Put	F53/54	Johnatan Salinas; Mexico	Erick Ortiz; Mexico	Alex Bohorquez; Colombia
Shot Put	F55	Wallace Santos; Brazil	Jackson Blanco; Venezuela	Sandro Varela; Brazil
Shot Put	F57	Thiago Paulino; Brazil	Marco Aurélio Borges; Brazil	Flavio De Jesús Teheran; Colombia
Shot Put	F63	Edenilson Floriani; Brazil	Nicolás Antonio Castro; Chile	Carlos Enrique Felipa; Peru
Discus Throw	F11	Alessandro Rodrigo da Silva; Brazil	Andrileydis Silot; Cuba	Wilmer Zambrano; Venezuela
Discus Throw	F37	Edwars Varela; Venezuela	Jesse Zesseu; Canada	João Victor Teixeira; Brazil
Discus Throw	F56	Claudiney Batista; Brazil	Leonardo Díaz; Cuba	Kenny Pacheco; Peru
Discus Throw	F64	Akeem Stewart; Trinidad and Tobago	Max Rohn; United States	Yorisan Monterey; Cuba
Javelin Throw	F13	Ulicer Aguilera Cruz; Cuba	Nathanael Sanchez; Dominican Republic	Only three competitors in event
Javelin Throw	F37/38	José Lemos; Colombia	Bryan Enriquez; Mexico	Luis Fernando Lucumí Villegas; Colombia
Javelin Throw	F41	Ever Castro Martínez; Cuba	Carlos Camargo; Venezuela	Marco Churuchumbi; Ecuador
Javelin Throw	F46	Guillermo Varona; Cuba	Eliezer Gabriel; Mexico	Matias Puebla; Argentina
Javelin Throw	F54	Edgar Fuentes; Mexico	Justin Phongsavanh; United States	Johnatan Salinas; Mexico
Javelin Throw	F55	Sandro Varelo; Brazil	Reinaldo Naranjo; Venezuela	Wallace Santos; Brazil
Javelin Throw	F57	Cícero Lins; Brazil	Luis Gomeztagle; Mexico	Gerdan Fonseca; Cuba
Javelin Throw	F64	Edenilson Floriani; Brazil	Francisco de Lima; Brazil	Romy Rodriguez; Venezuela

=== Women's events ===
Event	Class	Gold	Silver	Bronze
100 metres	T11	Jerusa Geber; Brazil	Angie Pabón; Colombia	Linda Pérez; Venezuela
100 metres	T12	Omara Durand; Cuba	Alejandra Pérez; Venezuela	Lorraine Gomes; Brazil
100 metres	T13	Rayane Soares; Brazil	Blanca Cerrudo; Argentina	Greilyz Villarroel; Venezuela
100 metres	T35	Brianna Salinaro; United States	Milagros Mostaffa; Argentina	Delaney Nolin; United States
100 metres	T36	Araceli Rotela; Argentina	Yanina Andrea Martinez; Argentina	Martha Hernández; Colombia
100 metres	T37	Karen Palomeque; Colombia	Taylor Swanson; United States	Marcelly Pedroso; Brazil
100 metres	T38	Darian Faisury Jiménez; Colombia	Katty Hurtado; Colombia	Catarina Guimarães; United States
100 metres	T47	Kiara Rodríguez; Ecuador	Fernanda da Silva; Brazil	Sheriauna Haase; Canada
100 metres	T53	Jessica Cooper Lewis; Bermuda	Chelsea Stein; United States	Lucero Vazquez; Mexico
100 metres	T54	Hannah Dederick; United States	Lucia Montenegro; Argentina	Aline Rocha; Brazil
100 metres	T64	Beatriz Hatz; United States	Sydney Barta; United States	Catherine Carey; United States
200 metres	T11	Jerusa Geber; Brazil	Thalita Simplício; Brazil	Sol Rojas; Venezuela
200 metres	T12	Omara Durand; Cuba	Alejandra Pérez; Venezuela	Lorraine Gomes; Brazil
200 metres	T35	Brianna Salinaro; United States	Delaney Nolin; United States	Milagros Mostaffa; Argentina
200 metres	T36	Araceli Rotela; Argentina	Samira da Silva; Brazil	Yanina Andrea Martinez; Argentina
200 metres	T37	Karen Palomeque; Colombia	Taylor Swanson; United States	Marcelly Pedroso; Brazil
200 metres	T47	Lisbeli Marina Vera Andrade; Venezuela	Fernanda da Silva; Brazil	Sheriauna Haase; Canada
200 metres	T64	Sydney Barta; United States	Beatriz Hatz; United States	Catherine Carey; United States
400 metres	T11	Thalita Simplicio; Brazil	Ionis Salcedo; Colombia	Diana Coraza; Mexico
400 metres	T12	Daniela Velasco; Mexico	Manuela Jacinto; Dominican Republic	Only three competitors in event
400 metres	T13	Rayane Soares; Brazil	Melissa Calvo; Costa Rica	Priscila Chavez; Mexico
400 metres	T20	María Alejandra Murillo; Colombia	Leonela Vera; Venezuela	Diana Vivenes; Dominican Republic
400 metres	T38	Karen Palomeque; Colombia	Katty Hurtado; Colombia	Milagros Gonzalez; Argentina
400 metres	T47	Fernanda da Silva; Brazil	Maria Clara Augusto; Brazil	Amanda Cerna; Chile
400 metres	T54	Hannah Dederick; United States	Aline Rocha; Brazil	Vanessa de Souza; Brazil
800 metres	T53/54	Aline Rocha; Brazil	Hannah Dederick; United States	Vanessa de Souza; Brazil
1500 metres	T11	Diana Coraza; Mexico	Johana Ramos; Mexico	Irene Suárez; Venezuela
1500 metres	T13	Francy Osorio; Colombia	Daniela Velasco; Mexico	Only three competitors in event
1500 metres	T54	Hannah Dederick; United States	Aline Rocha; Brazil	Vanessa de Souza; Brazil
Long Jump	T11/12	Lorena Silva; Brazil	Alice de Oliveira; Brazil	Rosibel Colmenarez; Venezuela
Long Jump	T36/37/38	Karen Palomeque; Colombia	Catarina Guimarães; United States	Tianna Rissling; Canada
Long Jump	T47	Kiara Rodríguez; Ecuador	Paola del Valle Garcia; Venezuela	Aldana Ibañez; Argentina
Long Jump	T42–44/ T61–64	Beatriz Hatz; United States	Ana Cláudia Maria da Silva; Brazil	Catherine Carey; United States
Shot Put	F12	Izabela Campos; Brazil	Jenifer da Silva; Brazil	Yesenia Restrepo; Colombia
Shot Put	F20	Poleth Méndes; Ecuador	Grecely Padilla; Ecuador	Only three competitors in event
Shot Put	F32/33/34	Wanna Brito; Brazil	Beth Grauer; United States	Leylane de Castro; Brazil
Shot Put	F35/36/37	Yomaira Cohen; Venezuela	María Henao; Colombia	Karen Tassi; Argentina
Shot Put	F40/41	Agustina Ruiz; Argentina	Mayerli Buitrago Ariza; Colombia	Pauleth Mejia; Mexico
Shot Put	F53/54/55	Elizabeth Rodrigues; Brazil	Gloria Zarza; Mexico	Rosa María Guerrero; Mexico
Shot Put	F57	María de los Ángeles Ortiz; Mexico	Christina Gardner; United States	Julyana Cristina da Silva; Brazil
Discus Throw	F11	Izabela Campos; Brazil	Yesenia Restrepo; Colombia	Florencia Romero; Argentina
Discus Throw	F38	Katty Hurtado; Colombia	Rosa Castro; Mexico	Renee Foessel; Canada
Discus Throw	F41	Estefany Lopez; Ecuador	Agustina Ruiz; Argentina	Charlotte Bolton; Canada
Discus Throw	F55	Érica Castaño; Colombia	Rosa María Guerrero; Mexico	Only three competitors in event
Discus Throw	F57	Floralia Estrada; Mexico	Yeniffer Paredes; Colombia	Julyana Cristina da Silva; Brazil
Discus Throw	F64	Osiris Machado; Mexico	Jessica Heims; United States	Alicia Guerrero; United States
Javelin Throw	F46	Naibys Daniela Morillo; Venezuela	Kenya Lozano; Mexico	Jennifer Villalobos; Mexico
Javelin Throw	F54	Yanivé Torres; Colombia	Poliana de Sousa; Brazil	Elizabeth Rodrigues; Brazil
Javelin Throw	F56	Raíssa Machado; Brazil	Yessica Jimenez; Mexico	Only three competitors in event

=== Mixed events ===
Event	Class	Gold	Silver	Bronze
4 × 100 metre relay	Universal	Colombia; Angie Pabón; Joan Lasso; Karen Palomeque; Sairo Fernández	Brazil; Jerusa Geber; Petrúcio Ferreira; Marcelly Pedroso; Ariosvaldo Fernandes	United States; David Brown; Beatriz Hatz; Ryan Medrano; Hannah Dederick

== See also ==
- Athletics at the 2023 Pan American Games
- Athletics at the 2024 Summer Paralympics
