= Tunisia at the 2013 IPC Athletics World Championships =

Tunisia participated in the 2013 IPC Athletics World Championships in Lyon, France. She participated with 12 athletes—6 men and 6 women—and she finished the competition in the 10th rank, with 15 medals: 8 gold, 6 silver, and 1 bronze.

== Participants and medallists ==
Men

- Walid Ktila
- Farhat Chida
- Abderrahim Zhiou
- Abbes Saidi
- Mohamed Zemzemi
- Mohamed Charmi

Women

- Neda Bahi
- Hania Aidi
- Raoua Tlili
- Fathia Amaimia
- Maroua Ibrahmi
- Fadhila Nafati
