= 2019 World Para Athletics Championships – Women's discus throw =

The women's discus throw events at the 2019 World Para Athletics Championships were held in Dubai win November 2019.

== Medalists ==
Event	Gold		Silver		Bronze	
F11	Assunta Legnante; Italy	37.89 AR	Zhang Liangmin; China	36.78 SB	Izabela Campos; Brazil	34.28
F38	Mi Na; China	37.50 CR	Simone Kruger; South Africa	33.91 WR	Renee Foessel; Canada	33.37 AR
F41	Raoua Tlili; Tunisia	34.48 CR	Youssra Karim; Morocco	33.59 PB	Niamh McCarthy; Ireland	29.70
F53	Elizabeth Rodrigues Gomes; Brazil	16.89 WR	Iana Lebiedieva; Ukraine	16.26 WR	Zoia Ovsii; Ukraine	13.52 WR
F55	Érica Castaño; Colombia	23.97 PB	Dong Feixia; China	23.49	Diāna Dadzīte; Latvia	22.97
F57	Nassima Saifi; Algeria	35.76 WR	Xu Mian; China	31.49 AR	Safia Djelal; Algeria	31.05 PB
F64	Yao Juan; China	38.78	Sarah Edmiston; Australia	36.43 AR	Faustyna Kotłowska; Poland	33.53 AR
WR world record | AR area record | CR championship record | GR games record | NR national record | OR Olympic record | PB personal best | SB season best | WL world leading (in a given season)

== See also ==
- List of IPC world records in athletics
