= Mokhigul Khamdamova =

Uzbekistani Paralympic athlete

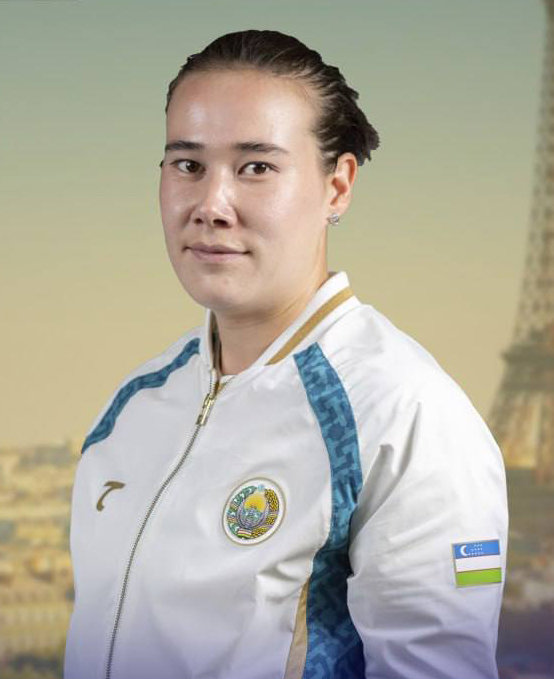

Personal information
- Born: 2 October 1995 (age 30) Fergana, Uzbekistan

Sport
- Country: Uzbekistan
- Sport: Para-athletics
- Event(s): Discus throw Shot put
Medal record
Women's para-athletics
Representing Uzbekistan
Paralympic Games
Gold medal – first place	2020 Tokyo	Discus throw F57
Bronze medal – third place	2024 Paris	Discus throw F57
World Championships
Silver medal – second place	2023 Paris	Discus throw F57
Asian Para Games
Gold medal – first place	2022 Hangzhou	Discus throw F56/57
Silver medal – second place	2018 Jakarta	Javelin throw F57
Bronze medal – third place	2022 Hangzhou	Shot put F57

Mokhigul Khamdamova (born 2 October 1995) is an Uzbekistani Paralympic athlete. She won the gold medal in the women's discus throw F57 event at the 2020 Summer Paralympics held in Tokyo, Japan. She also competed in the women's shot put F57 event.

== Career ==
In 2019, Khamdamova competed in the women's shot put F57 event at the World Para Athletics Championships held in Dubai, United Arab Emirates. She also competed in the women's discus throw F57 event.

== Achievements ==
=== Discus throw ===
Year	Competition	Venue	Position	Notes
2019	World Championships	Dubai, United Arab Emirates	5th	27.92 m
2021	Summer Paralympics	Tokyo, Japan	1st	31.46 m
2023	World Championships	Paris, France	2nd	30.51 m

=== Shot put ===
Year	Competition	Venue	Position	Notes
2019	World Championships	Dubai, United Arab Emirates	9th	8.39 m
2021	Summer Paralympics	Tokyo, Japan	9th	8.42 m
