= 2013 IPC Athletics World Championships – Women's discus throw =

The women's discus throw at the 2013 IPC Athletics World Championships was held at the Stade du Rhône from 20 to 29 July.

== Medalists ==
Class	Gold	Silver	Bronze
F11/12	Sofia Oksam; Russia	Liangmin Zhang; China	Marija Iveković-Meštrović; Croatia
F35/36	Mariia Pomazan; Ukraine	Wu Qing; China	Kath Proudfoot; Australia
F37	Mi Na; China	Victorya Yasevych; Ukraine	Beverley Jones; United Kingdom
F41	Raoua Tlili; Tunisia	Fathia Amaimia; Tunisia	Holly Neill; United Kingdom
F51/52/53	Josie Pearson; United Kingdom	Becky Richter; Canada	Zena Cole; United States
F54/55/56	Marianne Buggenhagen; Germany	Martina Willing; Germany	Shaimaa Gaber; Egypt
F57/58	Nassima Saifi; Algeria	Orla Barry; Ireland	Liu Ming; China

== See also ==
- List of IPC world records in athletics
