= Dong Feixia =

Chinese Paralympic athlete (born 1989)

Personal information
- Nationality: Chinese
- Born: 17 March 1989 (age 37)

Sport
- Country: China
- Sport: Athletics
- Disability class: F55
- Events: Javelin throw, discus throw, shot put
Medal record
Paralympic athletics
Representing China
Paralympic Games
Gold medal – first place	2016 Rio de Janeiro	Discus throw F54–56
Gold medal – first place	2020 Tokyo	Discus throw F55
Silver medal – second place	2024 Paris	Discus throw F55
World Championships
Silver medal – second place	2011 Christchurch	Discus throw F54/55/56
Silver medal – second place	2015 Doha	Discus throw F55
Silver medal – second place	2019 Dubai	Discus throw F55
Silver medal – second place	2024 Kobe	Discus throw F55
Asian Para Games
Gold medal – first place	2010 Guangzhou	Discus throw F54-56
Gold medal – first place	2010 Guangzhou	Shot put F54-56
Gold medal – first place	2014 Incheon	Discus throw F55/56
Gold medal – first place	2014 Incheon	Javelin throw F55/56
Gold medal – first place	2022 Hangzhou	Discus throw F54/55
Silver medal – second place	2018 Jakarta	Discus throw F54/55
Bronze medal – third place	2010 Guangzhou	Javelin throw F54-56

Dong Feixia (born 17 March 1989) is a Chinese Paralympian athlete who primarily competes in throwing events.

== Career ==
Dong first started the sport at the age of 15, after successfully completing a selection trial.

She made her debut at 2008 Summer Paralympics, held in her home country Chinacompeting in the Discus throw and Shot put events, placing 4th and 14th respectively in her class.

At the 2011 World Para Athletics Championships, Dong won Silver in the Discus. She also placed 8th in the Javelin throw and 9th in the Shot put.

After missing the 2012 Summer Paralympics, Dong returned to competition at the 2015 IPC Athletics World Championships, placing 2nd in the Discus, claiming the silver. She also competed in the Javelin and Shot put, placing 6th in both.

At the 2016 Summer Paralympics, Dong won gold in the F54/55/56 Discus Throw, with an attempt of 25.03 metres. She also placed 9th in the Javelin throw.

At the 2019 World Para Athletics Championships, Dong won silver in the Discus throw and placed 13th in the Javelin.

At the postponed 2020 Summer Paralympics, Dong retained her Olympic title in the Discus with a throw of 26.64 metres.

At the 2023 World Para Athletics Championships, she competed in the Discus and Javelin events placing 4th and 8th respectively.

In 2024, she once again competed at the World Para Athletics Championships gaining the silver in the Discus and 9th in the Javelin. At 2024 Summer Paralympics she failed to retain her title, placing 2nd behind Erica María Castâno.
