= Xue Enhui =

Chinese Paralympic athlete (born 1982)

Personal information
- Nationality: Chinese
- Born: 6 September 1982 (age 43) Harbin, China

Sport
- Sport: Para-athletics
- Disability class: F11
- Event(s): discus throw shot put
Medal record
Women's para-athletics
Representing China
Paralympic Games
Bronze medal – third place	2024 Paris	Discus throw F11
World Championships
Gold medal – first place	2024 Kobe	Discus throw F11
Gold medal – first place	2025 New Delhi	Discus throw F11
Silver medal – second place	2023 Paris	Discus throw F11
Bronze medal – third place	2024 Kobe	Shot put F12
Asian Para Games
Silver medal – second place	2022 Hangzhou	Discus throw F11
Bronze medal – third place	2022 Hangzhou	Shot put F11

Xue Enhui (born 6 September 1982) is a Chinese para-athlete specializing in throwing events: discus throw and shot put. She represented China at the 2024 Summer Paralympics.

== Career ==
In May 2024, Xue represented China at the 2024 World Para Athletics Championships and won a gold medal in the discus throw F11 and shot put F11 events. As a result, she qualified for the 2024 Summer Paralympics. At the 2024 Summer Paralympics, she won a bronze medal in the discus throw F11 event.
