= Glendale High School (Tillsonburg) =

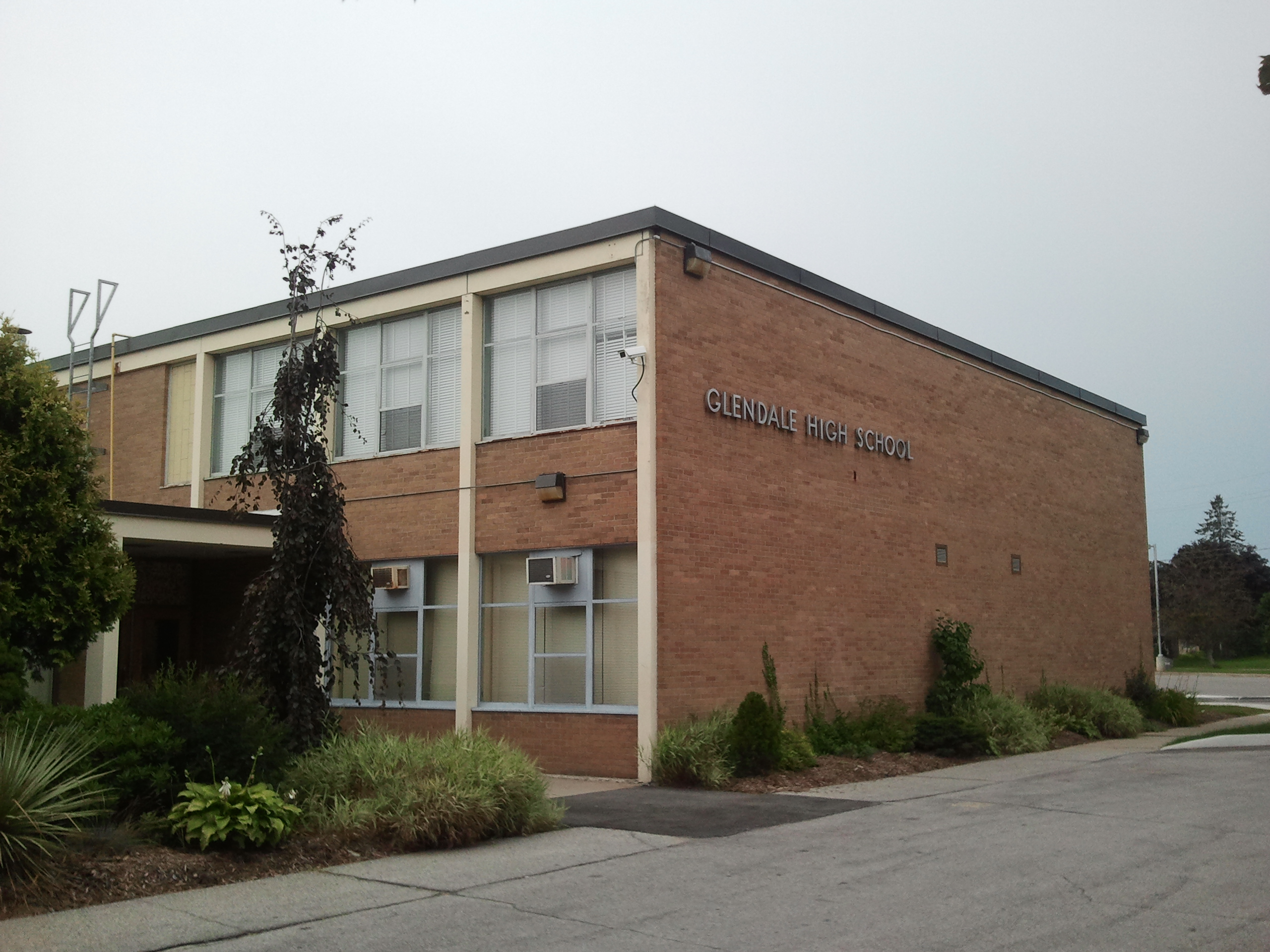

Location
- 37 Glendale Dr. Tillsonburg, Ontario, N4G 1J6; Canada; 42.86714°N 80.74171°W

Information
- School type: Public Secondary
- Motto: Scientia Est Vita (Knowledge is life)
- Founded: 1959
- School board: Thames Valley District School Board
- Superintendent: B. Sonier
- School number: 2130
- Administrator: A. Summers
- Principal: D. Robertson
- Grades: 9–12
- Enrollment: 876 (July 2011)
- Language: English
- Area: Tillsonburg
- Colours: Black, Gold, Green, White
- Mascot: Griff the Gryphon
- Team name: The Gemini
- Website: www.tvdsb.ca/Glendale.cfm

Glendale High School is the senior public high school in Tillsonburg, Ontario, Canada, and was founded in 1959. It is a fully composite school community offering courses for students in grades 9 through 12, along with sports, clubs and special events. Students within its attendance boundaries live in Tillsonburg, Otterville, Straffordville, Springford, Brownsville, and Courtland. Its mascot is the Griffon and its colours are black, gold, white, and green. Its staff consists of 54 classroom teachers supported by a teacher librarian, nurse, special education teachers and guidance counselors. The school shows strong academics with a strong staff across all departments. As of 2011 the school had an enrollment of 876. The school underwent renovations in 2010 and saw the addition of a new west wing which consisted of a new gymnasium and greenhouse, along with new Science, History, Geography, Law, Horticulture, Dance and French classrooms. The school went underway with another renovation in 2012 with the addition of a weight room.

== History ==
Glendale was founded in 1959 as a high school in Tillsonburg, Ontario. The school underwent renovations and additions to fit the incoming grade 9 students of Annandale High School to make Glendale a grade 9–12 school in 2010.

== Notable alumni ==
- Charlotte Bolton, Para-athlete

== See also ==
- Education in Ontario
- List of secondary schools in Ontario
