= Estefany López =

Ecuadorian Paralympic athlete (born 1992)

Personal information
- Full name: Estefany Gisela López Macas
- Nationality: Ecuadorian
- Born: 31 January 1992 (age 34)

Sport
- Country: Ecuador
- Sport: Para-athletics
- Disability class: F41
- Event(s): discus throw shot put
Medal record
Women's para-athletics
Representing Ecuador
Paralympic Games
Bronze medal – third place	2024 Paris	Discus throw F41
World Championships
Silver medal – second place	2025 New Delhi	Discus throw F41
Bronze medal – third place	2023 Paris	Discus throw F41
Bronze medal – third place	2024 Kobe	Discus throw F41
Parapan American Games
Gold medal – first place	2023 Santiago	Discus throw F41

Estefany Gisela López Macas (Note: In this Spanish name, the first or paternal surname is López and the second or maternal family name is Macas.) (born 31 January 1992) is an Ecuadorian para-athlete specializing in throwing events: discus throw and shot put. She represented Ecuador at the 2024 Summer Paralympics.

== Career ==
López competed at the 2023 World Para Athletics Championships and won a bronze medal in the discus throw F41 event with an America's record of 30.27 metres.

In May 2024, she competed at the 2024 World Para Athletics Championships and won a bronze medal in the discus throw F41 event.
