= Rosa María Guerrero =

Mexican Paralympic athlete (born 1984)

Personal information
- Full name: Rosa María Guerrero Cazares
- Nationality: Mexican
- Born: 30 November 1984 (age 41)
- Home town: Mazatlán, Mexico

Sport
- Country: Mexico
- Sport: Paralympic athletics
- Disability class: F55
- Events: Discus throw Shot put
- Club: Sinaloa State
- Coached by: Ivan Rodriguez Luna
Medal record
Women's para-athletics
Representing Mexico
Paralympic Games
Bronze medal – third place	2020 Tokyo	Discus throw F55
Bronze medal – third place	2024 Paris	Discus throw F55
World Championships
Gold medal – first place	2023 Paris	Discus throw F55
Bronze medal – third place	2017 London	Shot put F55
Bronze medal – third place	2024 Kobe	Discus throw F55
Parapan American Games
Gold medal – first place	2019 Lima	Discus throw F55
Gold medal – first place	2019 Lima	Shot put F53/54/55
Silver medal – second place	2023 Santiago	Discus Throw F55
Bronze medal – third place	2023 Santiago	Shot put F53/54/55

Rosa María Guerrero Cazares (Note: In this Spanish name, the first or paternal surname is Guerrero and the second or maternal family name is Cazares.) (born 30 November 1984) is a Mexican Paralympic athlete who competes in discus throw and shot put events in international level events.

== Career ==
For a long time she played soccer, but in 2010, due to a health problem, she was immobilized from the waist down and started playing basketball in a wheelchair. Shortly thereafter, the national athletics coach invited her to train at the CONADE's Mexican Paralympic Committee Center.

At the 2017 World Para Athletics Championships, she won the bronze medal in the F55 Shot put, with a throw of 7.45 metres. She also competed in the Discus throw coming 9th.

At the 2019 World Para Athletics Championships, she placed 4th in the F55 Discus Throw with a throw of 22.43 metres.

At the 2020 Summer Paralympics she finished in third place in the discus throw with a 24.11 meters, winning a bronze medal.

At the 2023 Parapan American Games, she competed in the F55 Discus and Shot put events, winning the silver and bronze respectively.

At the 2024 Summer Paralympics, she repeated her 2020 result winning bronze again with a throw of 25.81 metres, which was also a seasons best for her.
