= Mohamed Zemzemi =

Tunisian Paralympic athlete

Personal information
- Native name: محمد الزمزمي
- Born: Mohamed Zemzemi; July 3, 1991 (age 34)

Sport
- Disability class: F51
- Event: Discus throw
Medal record
Men's para athletics
Representing Tunisia
Paralympic Games
Bronze medal – third place	2012 London	Discus throw F51–52–53
World Championships
Silver medal – second place	2013 Lyon	Discus throw F51/52/53

Mohamed Zemzemi (Arabic: محمد الزمزمي; born July 3, 1991) is a Paralympian athlete from Tunisia competing mainly in category F51.

== Achievements ==
He competed in the 2012 Summer Paralympics in London, UK. There he won two bronze medals in the men's discus throw F51–53 event.

In 2013 IPC Athletics World Championships in Lyon, Mohamed Zemzemi won a silver medal in Men's discus throw F51/52/53 event.

== See also ==
- Tunisia at the 2013 IPC Athletics World Championships
- Tunisia at the 2012 Summer Paralympics
- Tunisia at the Paralympics
