= Charlotte Bolton =

Canadian para athletics competitor (born 2003)

- Bolton in 2026

Personal information
- Born: June 27, 2003 (age 23)
- Home town: Tillsonburg, Ontario, Canada

Sport
- Sport: Para athletics
- Disability class: F41
- Club: SISU Throws Club
- Coached by: Richard Parkinson
Medal record
Para athletics
Representing Canada
Parapan American Games
Bronze medal – third place	2023 Santiago	Women's Discus Throw F41

Charlotte Bolton (born June 27, 2003) is a Canadian para athlete. She competes in F41 throwing events. She has won 29 medals at the World Dwarf Games and a bronze medal in discus at the 2023 Parapan American Games.

== Early life and education ==
Bolton was born on June 27, 2003 to parents Scot Bolton and Bridget Fearon. She has cartilage-hair hypoplasia, a rare form of dwarfism. She has a sister, Madelyn.

Bolton attended Glendale High School in Tillsonburg. She is studying international biomedical sciences at York University, where she also competes on the varsity team.

== Career ==
At the 2013 World Dwarf Games in East Lansing, Michigan, Bolton won seven gold medals, four silver medals and one bronze medal in the 7 to 11-year-old Junior A youth division. Her medals included gold in shot put, javelin, discus, 40-metre, 60-metre, soccer, mixed volleyball and table tennis, as well as silver medals in the mixed-age relay, 25-metre freestyle and 25-metre backstroke, and bronze in the 25-metre relay.

In 2015, she wrote an original song, "Strong," which received over 5,500 views on YouTube. She performed "Strong" as well as other songs with her father at the Summer Daze Acoustic Concert Series in Tillsonburg.

Bolton won 17 medals in her 12-15 year old division at the 2017 World Dwarf Games held in Guelph: ten gold, six silver and one bronze. She competed in badminton, basketball, soccer, swimming, track and field, table tennis and volleyball. She joined the Woodstock Legion Athletic Club in 2018 to concentrate training on throwing. During the COVID-19 pandemic, as her high school classes shifted online, Bolton was able to train with the national coach Richard Parkinson at the East Hub in Toronto.

Bolt holds three F41 national records. In June 2021, Bolton set the Canadian F41 discus record at the Royal City Inferno Track & Field Festival in Guelph, tossing 29.65 metres. She made her Paralympic debut at the 2020 Summer Paralympics in Tokyo. At 18 years old, she was the youngest member of Canada's para-athletics team. Bolton placed 6th in both the women's F41 shot put and discus throw.

She won bronze in the women's discus throw F41 at the 2023 Parapan American Games, her Parapan Am debut. She also came fifth in the women's F41 shot put. At the 2023 World Para Athletics Championships, Bolton placed ninth in the women's F41 shot put. She placed eighth in the women's discus throw F41.

Bolton competed at the 2024 Summer Paralympics. She placed 10th in the women's F41 shotput and 6th in the women's F41 discus. She trains full time at the Athletics Canada East Hub in Toronto.
