= Iana Lebiedieva =

Ukrainian Paralympic athlete (born 1984)

Personal information
- Born: 12 February 1984 (age 42)

Sport
- Country: Ukraine
- Sport: Para-athletics
- Disability class: F53
- Events: Discus throw; Javelin throw; Shot put
Medal record
Women's para-athletics
Representing Ukraine
Paralympic Games
Silver medal – second place	2020 Tokyo	Discus throw F53
World Championships
Silver medal – second place	2017 London	Shot put F53
Silver medal – second place	2019 Dubai	Discus throw F53
European Championships
Gold medal – first place	2018 Berlin	Discus throw F53
Gold medal – first place	2021 Bydgoszcz	Discus throw F53
Gold medal – first place	2021 Bydgoszcz	Shot put F54
Silver medal – second place	2018 Berlin	Shot put F54
Bronze medal – third place	2018 Berlin	Javelin throw F54

Iana Lebiedieva (born 12 February 1984) is a Ukrainian Paralympic athlete competing in F53-classification events. She won the silver medal in the women's discus throw F53 event at the 2020 Summer Paralympics in Tokyo, Japan.

She is a two-time silver medalist at the World Para Athletics Championships and a five-time medalist, including three golds, at the World Para Athletics European Championships.
