= Oksana Dobrovolskaja =

Lithuania para athlete (born 1996)

Personal information
- Born: 6 February 1996 (age 30) Vilnius, Lithuania

Sport
- Sport: Para-athletics
- Disability: Retinitis pigmentosa
- Disability class: F11
- Event: discus throw
- Coached by: Terese Nekrošaitė (previously Jonas Burakovas)

Achievements and titles
- Personal best: Discus F11: 38.87 m (2026)
Medal record
Women's para-athletics
Representing Lithuania
World Championships
Bronze medal – third place	2025 New Delhi	Discus throw F11

Oksana Dobrovolskaja (born 6 February 1996) is a visually impaired Lithuanian para-athlete specializing in discus throw. She represented Lithuania at the 2020 and 2024 Summer Paralympics.

== Career ==
Dobrovolskaja initially tried swimming and blind table tennis before focusing on para-athletics in 2018, when coach Jonas Burakovas suggested she train in discus throw. She made her international debut at the 2019 Grand Prix stage in Paris and finished fourth in the discus throw F11 at the 2021 European Para Athletics Championships. Dobrovolskaja represented Lithuania at the 2020 Summer Paralympics and finished in eighth place in the discus throw F11 event. At the 2020 Summer Paralympics, she recorded a distance of 29.50 m. She was named the Lithuanian Sportswoman of the Year for Paralympic sports in 2021, 2024, and 2025. She again represented Lithuania at the 2024 Summer Paralympics and finished in fifth place in the discus throw F11 event with a throw of 34.49 m.

Following the 2024 Summer Paralympics, she visited 15 schools for children with disabilities in sports activities. She was subsequently awarded the Young Athlete Role Model award by the Lithuanian National Olympic Committee. She received competition support through the IPC's Sport for Mobility programme to attend the 2025 World Championships. She competed at the 2025 World Para Athletics Championships and won a bronze medal in the discus throw F11 event. After winning bronze, Dobrovolskaja reflected: "It turned out to be an interesting chronology: in my first World Championship I took fifth place, in the second fourth place, and in this third championship I won bronze, finally earning a long-awaited medal."

== Personal life ==
Dobrovolskaja was diagnosed with retinitis pigmentosa. She initially studied at Vilnius Lazdynai School before transferring to the Lithuanian Education Center for the Blind and Visually Impaired in the tenth grade due to progressive vision loss. She later earned a bachelor's degree in law and finance from Vytautas Magnus University.
