= Samantha Schmidt =

Australian Paralympic athlete

Personal information
- Nationality: Australian
- Born: 10 October 2001 (age 24)

Sport
- Disability class: F38
- Club: Bundaberg Athletic Club
- Coached by: Ralph Newton

Samantha Schmidt (born 10 October 2001) is an Australian Paralympic athlete. She represented Australia at the 2020 Tokyo Paralympics and the 2024 Paris Paralympics.

== Early life ==
Samanatha Schmidt was born on 10 October 2001 to Gemina Moore and David Schmidt. Schmidt has cerebral palsy, and is of Wakawaka and Gubbi Gubbi descent. She attended Bundaberg State High School and lives in Bundaberg, Queensland.

== Athletics career ==
Schmidt picked up a discus at the age of five and is classified as F38 thrower. She was the national champion for open women para discus and javelin in 2018, and she was chosen for the Tokyo 2020 Paralympic discus shadow squad in 2020.

In March 2021, Schmidt threw a personal best 33.66 m, setting a new national and Oceania record.

At the 2020 Tokyo Paralympics, she finished sixth in the Women's Discus F38 with a distance of 30:26. She finished fifth in the Women's Discus F38 at the 2023 World Para Athletics Championships. At the 2024 Paris Paralympics, she finished seventh in the Women's Discus throw F38.

Schmidt is coached by Ralph Newton.
