= Samantha Heyison =

American para athlete (born 2005)

Personal information
- Born: August 5, 2005 (age 20) Adamstown, Maryland, U.S.
- Education: Wake Forest University

Sport
- Sport: Para-athletics
- Disability: Constricted band syndrome
- Disability class: F64
- Event(s): discus throw shot put
Medal record
Women's para-athletics
Representing the United States
World Championships
Silver medal – second place	2025 New Delhi	Discus throw F44
Bronze medal – third place	2023 Paris	Discus throw F64
Bronze medal – third place	2023 Paris	Shot put F64

Samantha Heyison (born August 5, 2005), is an American para athlete specializing in throwing events. She represented the United States at the 2024 Summer Paralympics.

== Early life and education ==
Heyison played soccer, softball and basketball growing up, before focusing on track and field. She attended Urbana High School in Ijamsville, Maryland. During the 2021 Maryland 4A state championship she finished in second place in discus and fifth in shot put. She was the 2022 Maryland 4A state champion in discus and the 2023 Maryland 4A state champion in both discus and shot put. She was named a two-time U.S. Paralympics track and field high school Athlete of the Year.

She attends Wake Forest University and is a member of their track and field team.

== Career ==
Heyison made her international debut for the United States at the 2023 World Para Athletics Championships and won bronze medals in the discus throw and shot put events.

In July 2024, during the U.S. Paralympic team trials, she qualified to represent the United States at the 2024 Summer Paralympics in discus throw and shot put.

== Personal life ==
Heyison was born five and a half weeks premature and diagnosed with Constricted band syndrome, which resulted in a clubbed left foot with all five toes being partially amputated, a right foot with three toes fused together and a right hand missing two fingers. Her mother, Tanya, played volleyball at the University of Maryland, Baltimore County, while her father, Marc, was a baseball player and drafted in the ninth round of the 1983 MLB draft by the Baltimore Orioles.
