= Keiko Onidani =

Japanese Paralympic athlete (born 1994)

Personal information
- Born: 21 December 1994 (age 31) Kochi, Japan

Sport
- Sport: Para-athletics
- Disability class: F53
- Event: discus throw
Medal record
Para-athletics
Representing Japan
Paralympic Games
Silver medal – second place	2024 Paris	Discus throw F53
World Championships
Silver medal – second place	2024 Kobe	Discus throw F53
Asian Para Games
Bronze medal – third place	2022 Hangzhou	Discus throw F51/52/53

Keiko Onidani (鬼谷 慶子, Onidani Keiko; born 21 December 1994 in Kochi, Japan) is a Japanese para-athlete specializing in discus throw. She represented Japan at the 2024 Summer Paralympics.

== Career ==
In May 2024, Onidani represented Japan at the 2024 World Para Athletics Championships and won a silver medal in the discus throw F53 event. She then represented Japan at the 2024 Summer Paralympics and won a silver medal in the javelin throw F53 event.
