= Julyana Cristina da Silva =

Brazilian Paralympic athlete (born 1996)

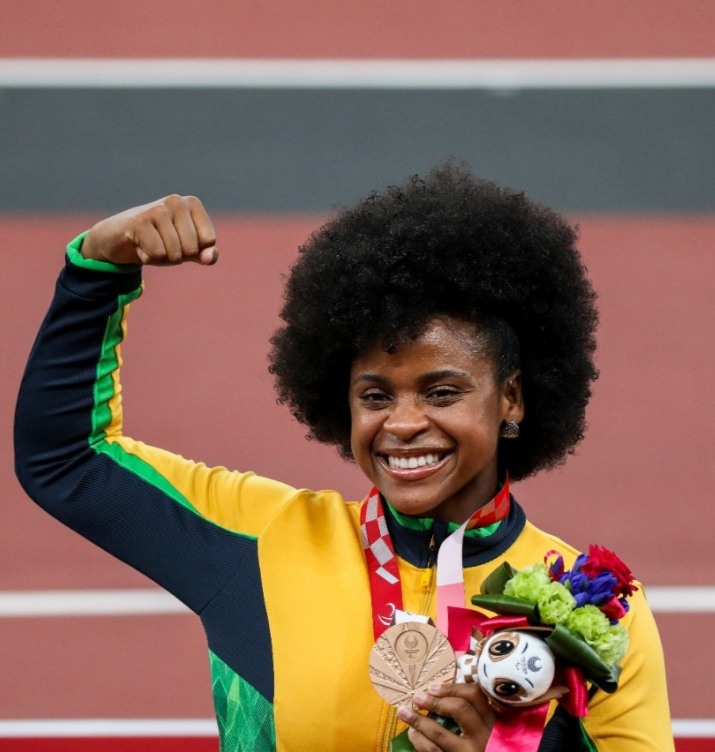
- Silva at the 2020 Summer Paralympics

Personal information
- Born: 1 May 1996 (age 30) Rio de Janeiro, Brazil

Sport
- Country: Brazil
- Sport: Para-athletics
Medal record
Women's para-athletics
Representing Brazil
Paralympic Games
Bronze medal – third place	2020 Tokyo	Discus throw F57
Parapan American Games
Bronze medal – third place	2023 Santiago	Shot put F57
Bronze medal – third place	2023 Santiago	Discus throw F57

Julyana Cristina da Silva (born 1 May 1996) is a Brazilian Paralympic athlete. She won the bronze medal in the women's discus throw F57 event at the 2020 Summer Paralympics held in Tokyo, Japan.
