= Norelhouda El Kaoui =

Moroccan Paralympic athlete

Personal information
- Born: 3 January 1983 (age 42)

Sport
- Sport: Paralympic athletics

Norelhouda El Kaoui (born 3 January 1983) is a Moroccan Paralympic athlete who competes in throwing events.

== Career ==
Her first major competition was at the 2023 World Para Athletics Championships, where she placed 7th in the F55 shot put.

At the same championships the following year in 2024, Norelhouda placed 6th in the same event.

In the 2024 Summer Paralympics, Norelhouda placed 5th in the shot put, breaking the African record with a throw of 23.42 metres.
