= Ella Hose =

Australian Paralympic athlete

Personal information
- Nationality: Australian
- Born: 4 July 2005 (age 21)

Sport
- Country: Australia
- Sport: Athletics
- Disability: Cerebral Palsy
- Events: Shot Put and Discus Throw
- Club: Ringwood Athletics Club
- Coached by: John Eden

Achievements and titles
- Highest world ranking: 4th
- Personal best: 11.25m

Ella Hose (born 4 July 2005) is an Australian Paralympic athletics competitor. She competed at the 2024 Paris Paralympics.

== Personal ==
Hose was born 4 July 2005. She was diagnosed with left hemiplegic cerebral palsy at two and a half. Her twin sister Jasmine also has cerebral palsy. In 2011, Ella and her sister Jasmine, underwent surgery at the Royal Children's Hospital to correct their limbs. Ella had her tendon lengthened in her left leg which meant she could place her foot on the ground. She attended Eastwood Primary School and Ringwood Secondary College, graduating in 2023, achieving multiple academic awards throughout her time there.

== Athletics ==
She is classified as a F37 athlete. Hose played netball, basketball, tennis, dancing, swimming growing up. She was classified in 2015. During, high school she set many Australian junior records and won a total of 10 national titles. After changing classifications from an F38 to an F37 in 2022, Hose began to set her sights on the Paris 2024 Paralympics F37 Shot Put event. At the 2023 World Para Athletics Championships, when she had just turned eighteen, she finished fourth in the Women's Shot Put F37 and tenth in the Women's Discus F37.

Hose competed at the 2024 Paralympic Games in Paris, France. She placed fourth in the Women’s Shot Put F37 with a PB and Australian Record of 11.25 m. She placed 11th in the Women’s Discus F38 with a PB of 28.36 m. At the 2025 World Para Athletics Championships, she finished fourth and seventh in the Women’s Shot Put F37 and Women's Discus F38 respectively with season’s bests of 10.80m and 28.09m. In 2025, Hose made technical changes in her shot put to begin throwing with a rotation action.

She was coached by Gus Puopolo from 2017 to 2023. As of 2024, she is coached by John Eden, a Paralympic medalist in track and field.

In 2024, she was awarded a Tier 3 Scholarship within the Sport Australia Hall of Fame Scholarship and Mentoring Program. In 2024, she is a Victorian Institute of Sport scholarship athlete.
