= Mi Na (athlete) =

Chinese Paralympic athlete (born 1986)

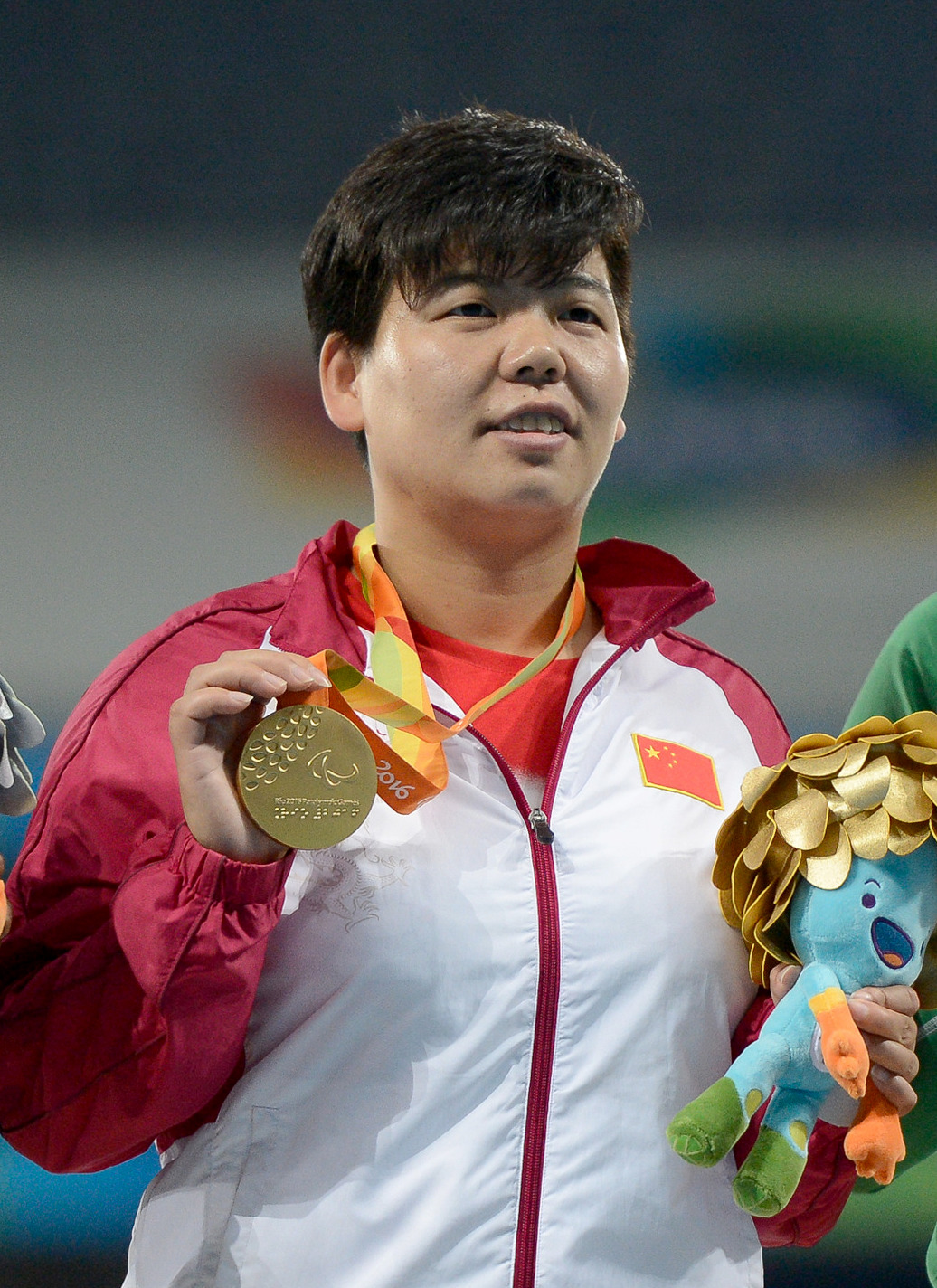
- Mi at the 2016 Paralympics

Personal information
- Born: August 5, 1986 (age 39) Hebei, China
- Education: Accounting; Hebei Language Institute: Shijiazhuang, China

Sport
- Sport: Para-athletics
- Disability: Cerebral palsy
- Disability class: F37
- Club: Hebei Para-Athletics Team
- Coached by: Han Song
Medal record
Women's para athletics
Representing China
Paralympic Games
Gold medal – first place	2008 Beijing	Shot put F37/F38
Gold medal – first place	2008 Beijing	Discus throw F37/F38
Gold medal – first place	2012 London	Shot put F37
Gold medal – first place	2012 London	Discus throw F37
Gold medal – first place	2016 Rio de Janeiro	Discus throw F37/38
Gold medal – first place	2020 Tokyo	Discus throw F37/38
Silver medal – second place	2016 Rio de Janeiro	Shot put F37
Silver medal – second place	2016 Rio de Janeiro	Javelin throw F37
Silver medal – second place	2020 Tokyo	Shot put F37
Silver medal – second place	2024 Paris	Shot put F37
World Championships
Gold medal – first place	2011 Christchurch	Shot put F37
Gold medal – first place	2011 Christchurch	Discus throw F37
Gold medal – first place	2013 Lyon	Shot put F37
Gold medal – first place	2013 Lyon	Discus throw F37
Gold medal – first place	2015 Doha	Shot put F37
Gold medal – first place	2015 Doha	Discus throw F38
Gold medal – first place	2017 London	Discus throw F38
Gold medal – first place	2017 London	Javelin throw F37
Gold medal – first place	2017 London	Shot Put F37
Gold medal – first place	2019 Dubai	Discus throw F38
Silver medal – second place	2015 Doha	Javelin throw F37
Silver medal – second place	2019 Dubai	Shot Put F37
Silver medal – second place	2025 New Delhi	Discus throw F38
Bronze medal – third place	2023 Paris	Discus throw F38
Bronze medal – third place	2024 Kobe	Shot put F37
Bronze medal – third place	2025 New Delhi	Shot put F37
Asian Para Games
Gold medal – first place	2010 Guangzhou	Discus throw F37
Gold medal – first place	2010 Guangzhou	Shot put F37
Gold medal – first place	2014 Incheon	Discus throw F36/37/38
Gold medal – first place	2018 Jakarta	Discus throw F37/38
Gold medal – first place	2018 Jakarta	Shot put F35/36/37
Gold medal – first place	2022 Hangzhou	Discus throw F37/38
Silver medal – second place	2010 Guangzhou	Javelin throw F37-38
Silver medal – second place	2014 Incheon	Javelin throw F37/38
Silver medal – second place	2022 Hangzhou	Shot put F35/36/37

Mi Na (Chinese: 米娜; pinyin: Mǐ Nà; born August 5, 1986) is a Chinese Paralympic athlete who competes in throwing events for F37 classification cerebral palsy athletes.

== Career ==
From April 2014 until September 2016 she held the women's F37 World Record in the shot put. She holds the world record in the F37 discus throw. She won 9 medals (6 Gold) at the Paralympic Games and 12 medals (10 Gold) at the IPC Athletics World Championships.

Mi began competing in para-athletics in 2005, and made her international debut in 2008. She competed at the 2008 Summer Paralympics in Beijing, China, where she won gold medals in the women's shot put F37/F38 and discus throw F37/F38 events, setting new F37 world records both events. At the 2012 Summer Paralympics in London, Mi repeated this double, winning the F37 shot put and F37 discus gold medals with world record throws. She placed 4th in the F37/F38 javelin event at the 2012 Paralympics. At the 2016 Rio Games she won the discus throw and placed second in the javelin and shot put.

In 2017 she won the F37 discus and shot put events at the World Para Athletics Grand Prix in Beijing.
