= Renee Foessel =

Canadian para athletics competitor

Personal information
- Full name: Renee Danielle Foessel
- Born: May 30, 1995 (age 31) Mississauga, Ontario, Canada
- Education: Humber College

Sport
- Country: Canada
- Sport: Para athletics
- Disability: Cerebral palsy, hemiplegia
- Disability class: T38
- Event(s): Discus throw Javelin throw Shot put
- Club: Cruisers Sports
- Coached by: Ken Hall
Medal record
Para athletics
Representing Canada
World Championships
Silver medal – second place	2023 Paris	Discus throw F38
Bronze medal – third place	2015 Doha	Discus throw F38
Bronze medal – third place	2019 Dubai	Discus throw F38
Parapan American Games
Gold medal – first place	2015 Toronto	Discus throw F38
Silver medal – second place	2015 Toronto	Shot put F38
Bronze medal – third place	2015 Toronto	Javelin throw F38
Bronze medal – third place	2023 Santiago	Discus throw F38

Renee Danielle Foessel (born May 30, 1995) is a Canadian Paralympic athlete who specializes in throwing events in international level events.

== Early life and education ==
Foessel was born with cerebral palsy with hemiplegia affecting her right side. She is the middle child of three daughters. She was born in Mississauga, Ontario, and moved with her family to Orangeville in 2014.

In 2020, Foessel completed a degree in criminal justice and a diploma in community and justice services at Humber College.

== Career ==
Foessel is coached by Ken Hall at Cruisers Sports in Mississauga, where she began training at six years old. In 2011, she was the youngest Canadian athlete at the 2011 International Paralympic Committee Athletics World Championship. She was set to compete in javelin, discus, and shot put, but was told at the championships that, due to a switch in classification, she could only compete in javelin. She was just shy of making the team for the 2012 Summer Paralympics. In 2013, Athletics Ontario named her the Most Outstanding Female Field Performer.

At the 2015 Parapan American Games in Toronto, Foessel won three medals: bronze in javelin, silver in shot put, and gold in discus. She placed fourth in the F38 discus throw at the 2016 Summer Paralympics. She also placed fourth in discus at the 2017 World Para Athletics Championships. At the 2019 World Para Athletics Championships, Foessel won bronze in women's discus F38 and set a new Canadian record.

Foessel qualified for the 2020 Summer Paralympics, in Discus throw F38. She placed fourth overall. In 2021, she set a world record in the F38 discus with a throw of 37.88 meters. At the 2022 Canadian National Track and Field Championships in Langley, she was the Canadian Women’s Para-Ambulatory Discus and Shot Put Champion.

She won silver in F38 discus at the 2023 World Para Athletics Championships, her fifth appearance at Worlds. Later that year, she won bronze in discus at the 2023 Parapan American Games. Foessel will compete in F38 discus at the 2024 Summer Paralympics.

== Personal life ==
Foessel works as an information management clerk for the Barrie Police Service.
