= Rosa Carolina Castro Castro =

Mexican Paralympic athlete (born 2002)

Rosa Carolina Castro
Personal information
- Full name: Rosa Carolina Castro Castro
- Nationality: Mexican
- Born: 3 February 2002 (age 24) Los Cabos, Baja California Sur

Sport
- Country: Mexico
- Sport: Paralympic athletics
- Disability class: F38
Medal record
Women's parathletism
Representing Mexico
Summer Paralympics
Bronze medal – third place	2020 Tokyo	discus throw F38

Rosa Carolina Castro Castro (born 3 February 2002) is a Mexican Paralympic athlete. She represented Mexico at the 2020 Summer Paralympics, where she won a bronze medal in the discus throw F38 event.
