= Sakshi Kasana =

Indian para athlete

Personal information
- Born: 21 August 1996 (age 29) Meerut, India

Sport
- Sport: Paralympic athletics

Sakshi Kasana (born 21 August 1996) is an Indian para athlete from Uttar Pradesh. She competes in the women's discus throw F55 category. She qualified to represent India at the 2024 Summer Paralympics at Paris.

== Early life ==
Kasana was born with a congenital deformity in her right leg that affected her mobility. After taking up sports, she learnt her basics at the Sports Authority of India training centre at Ghaziabad under coach Amit Kumar.

== Career ==
She could not qualify for the 2020 Summer Paralympics at Tokyo as many Indians could not travel to the qualifying event, the European Grand Prix Circuit, in May 2021 due to COVID-19.

However, she later won a bronze at the 2022 Asian Para Games at Hangzhou, China. She threw a distance of 24.77m and finished behind China's Wang Yanping and Iran's Hashemiyeh Motaghian Moavi in the javelin throw. She also placed 6th in the discus throw.

In March 2021, she came into limelight with a silver at the National Para Athletics Championship at Bangalore. At the 2023 World Para Athletics Championships, she placed 6th and the 11th in the Discus and Javelin throw respectively. At the 2024 World Para Athletics Championships, she placed 7th in the Discus throw. After missing out on Tokyo, Sakshi qualified for the discus throw at the 2024 Summer Paralympics. There she placed 7th with a throw of 21.45 metres.
