= Ida Yessica Nesse =

Norwegian Paralympic athlete

Ida Yessica Viviana Nesse
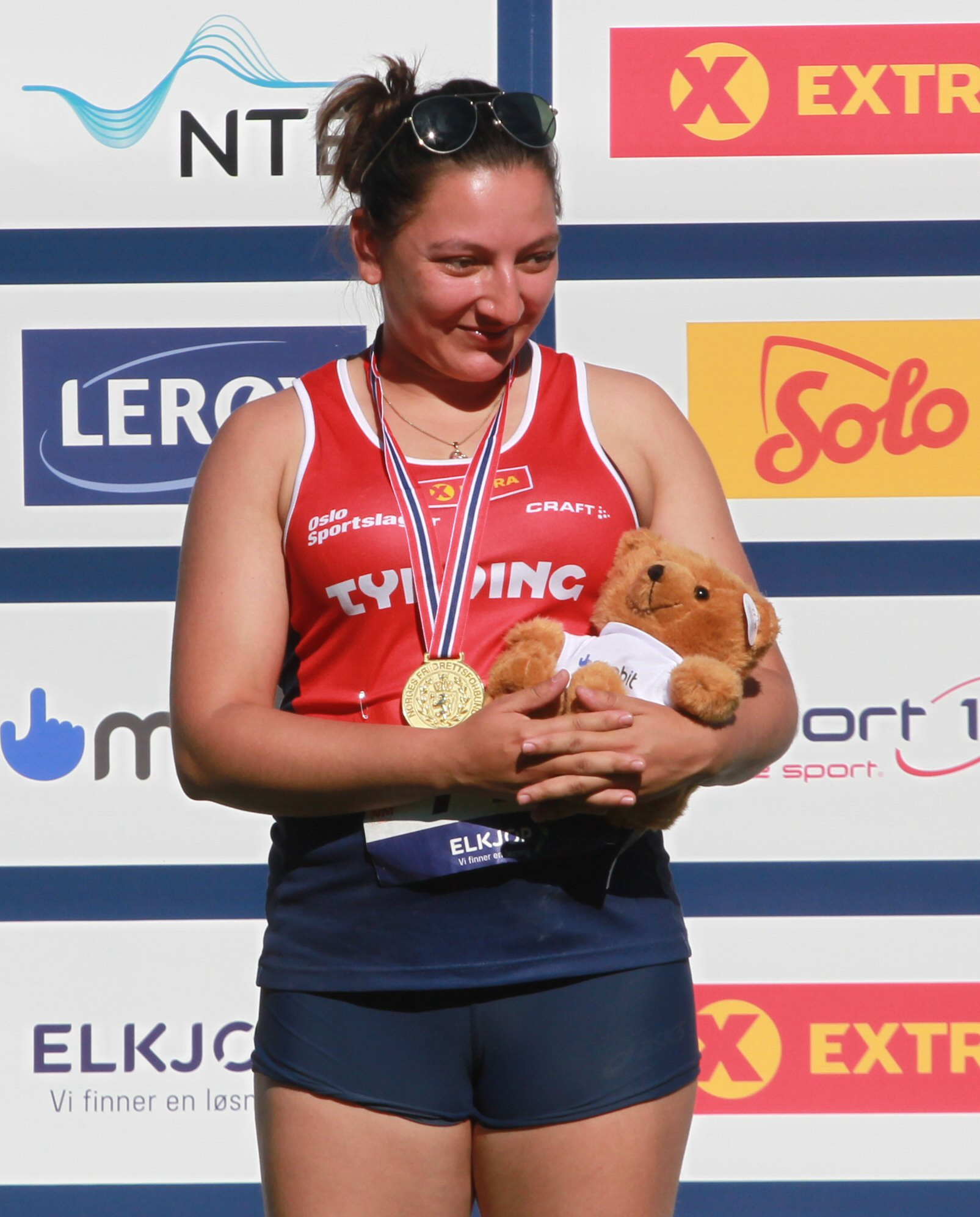
- Nesse in 2022

Personal information
- Full name: Ida Yessica Nesse
- Born: 19 October 1992 (age 33) Bærum, Norway

Sport
- Country: Norway
- Sport: Paralympic athletics
- Disability: Club foot
- Disability class: T44
- Coached by: Jo Nesse
Medal record
Paralympic athletics
Representing Norway
European Championships
Gold medal – first place	2018 Berlin	Discus throw F64
Silver medal – second place	2021 Bydgoszcz	Discus throw F64

Ida Yessica Viviana Nesse (born 19 October 1992) is a Norwegian Paralympic athlete who competes in discus throw and shot put at international elite competitions. She is a European champion in the discus throw. Nesse competed for Norway at the 2016 Summer Paralympics, where she finished seventh in the women's F44 discus throw event. She has qualified to compete at the 2020 Summer Paralympics.
