= Raoua Tlili =

Tunisian Paralympic athlete (born 1989)

Personal information
- Native name: روعة التليلي
- Born: Raoua Tlili; October 5, 1989 (age 36)
- Years active: 2006–2015 (Track and field F40); 2015–present (Track and field F41)
- Height: 1.33 m (4 ft 4 in)
- Weight: 51 kg (112 lb)

Sport
- Disability class: F41
- Club: Tunisian Federation of Sports for the Disabled, Gafsa, TUN
- Coached by: Mohamed Yahia
Medal record
Women's para athletics
Representing Tunisia
Paralympic Games
Gold medal – first place	2012 London	Shot put F40
Gold medal – first place	2016 Rio de Janeiro	Shot put F41
Gold medal – first place	2016 Rio de Janeiro	Discus throw F41
Gold medal – first place	2020 Tokyo	Shot put F41
Gold medal – first place	2020 Tokyo	Discus throw F41
Gold medal – first place	2024 Paris	Shot put F41
Gold medal – first place	2024 Paris	Discus throw F41
Silver medal – second place	2008 Beijing	Discus throw F40
Silver medal – second place	2008 Beijing	Shot put F40
Silver medal – second place	2012 London	Discus throw F40
World Championships
Gold medal – first place	2011 Christchurch	Shot put F40
Gold medal – first place	2013 Lyon	Discus throw F41
Gold medal – first place	2015 Doha	Discus throw F41
Gold medal – first place	2015 Doha	Shot put F41
Gold medal – first place	2017 London	Discus throw F41
Gold medal – first place	2017 London	Shot put F41
Gold medal – first place	2019 Dubai	Discus throw F41
Gold medal – first place	2023 Paris	Shot put F41
Gold medal – first place	2023 Paris	Discus throw F41
Gold medal – first place	2024 Kobe	Shot put F41
Gold medal – first place	2025 New Delhi	Discus throw F41
Silver medal – second place	2011 Christchurch	Discus throw F40
Bronze medal – third place	2006 Assen	Discus throw F40
Bronze medal – third place	2025 New Delhi	Shot put F41

Raoua Tlili (Arabic: روعة التليلي; born October 5, 1989) is a Paralympian athlete from Tunisia competing mainly in category F41 shot put and discus events and is a seven time gold medalist at the Paralympics.

== Career ==
Tlili made her senior international debut back in 2006, she competed in the 2008 Summer Paralympics in Beijing, China, there she won a gold medal in the women's shot put F40 event throwing a new world record of 8.95 meters and also a silver medal in the women's discus throw F40 event.

Four years later she competed in the 2012 Summer Paralympics in London, UK. She matched her medal tally from Beijing, again winning the gold medal in the F40 shot put in another world record distance of 9.86 meters, she also backed that up with another silver medal in the F40 discus event.

At the 2016 Summer Olympics she managed to win gold medals in both here events, firstly she won in the F41 shot put throwing a distance of 10.19 meters winning by 1.80 meters, then six days later she throw a new world record distance of 33.38 meters to win the F40/F41 discus gold medal.

At the delayed 2020 Summer Paralympics, held in Tokyo, Tlili won gold in both the shot put and discus events.

At the 2024 Summer Paralympics, held in Paris, Tlili won her fifth consecutive gold medal in the shot put, with a throw of 10.40 metres. She also won gold in the discus throw, taking her tally to seven Paralympic gold medals.

In between the Summer Olympics her success continued at the IPC Athletics World Championships, with gold medals in the F40/F41 shot put in 2011 and 2015, and in the F40/F41 discus she won gold in 2013 and 2015 with a silver medal in 2011. In 2019, she won the gold medal in the women's shot put F41 event at the 2019 World Para Athletics Championships.

== IPC Records ==
As of October 2016, Tlili is the owner of IPC world records of 33.38 meters in the discus category F41, which is also the Paralympic record, and she is also the Paralympic record holder in the F41 shot put with 10.19, she also holds the IPC Athletics World Championships records in shot put and discus, she set them both at the 2015 IPC Athletics World Championships.

== Events ==
- Women's shot put – F41
- Women's discus throw – F41
