= Kristel Walther =

Danish Paralympic discus thrower

Personal information
- Full name: Kristel Høj Walther
- Born: 11 December 1987 (age 38) Kerteminde, Denmark

Sport
- Country: Denmark
- Sport: Paralympic athletics
- Disability class: T64
- Event: Discus throw
- Club: Odense Atletik
Medal record
Paralympic athletics
Representing Denmark
European Championships
Silver medal – second place	2018 Berlin	Women's discus throw F64

Kristel Høj Walther (born 11 December 1987) is a Danish Paralympic athlete who competes in discus throw at international level events. She is a European silver medalist at the 2018 World Para Athletics European Championships. In 2008, she had her right leg amputated below the knee after she discovered an aggressive benign tumour in her heel bone.

Walther's great-grandfather, Aage Walther was a silver medalist in gymnastics at the 1920 Summer Olympics in Antwerp. Kristel finished ninth at the women's discus throw F46 and is scheduled to compete at the 2020 Summer Paralympics.
