= Fathia Amaimia =

Tunisian Paralympic athlete

Personal information
- Born: 5 September 1989 (age 37)

Sport
- Country: Tunisia
- Sport: Para-athletics
- Disability class: F41
- Events: Discus throw; Shot put
Medal record
Women's para-athletics
Representing Tunisia
Paralympic Games
Bronze medal – third place	2016 Rio de Janeiro	Discus throw F41
World Championships
Silver medal – second place	2013 Lyon	Discus throw F41
Silver medal – second place	2015 Doha	Discus throw F41

Fathia Amaimia (born 5 September 1989) is a Tunisian Paralympic athlete of short stature. She competes in F41-classification throwing events. She represented Tunisia at the 2016 Summer Paralympics in Rio de Janeiro, Brazil and she won the bronze medal in the women's discus throw F41 event. She also competed in the women's shot put F41 event where she finished in 6th place.

At the 2013 IPC Athletics World Championships held in Lyon, France, she won the silver medal in the women's discus throw F41 event. Two years later, at the 2015 IPC Athletics World Championships in Doha, Qatar, she also won a silver medal in the same event. In 2019, she finished in 8th place in the women's shot put F41 event at the 2019 World Para Athletics Championships held in Dubai, United Arab Emirates.
