= Osiris Aneth Machado =

Mexican paralympic athlete

Personal information
- Born: 2 January 2004 (age 22)

Sport
- Country: Mexico
- Sport: Para-athletics
- Disability class: F64
Medal record
Para-athletics
Representing Mexico
Paralympic Games
Bronze medal – third place	2024 Paris	Discus throw F64
World Championships
Gold medal – first place	2025 New Delhi	Discus throw F44
Silver medal – second place	2024 Kobe	Discus throw F64

Osiris Aneth Machado (born 2 January 2004) is a Mexican para-athlete. She competed at the 2024 Summer Paralympics, winning the bronze medal in the women's discus throw F64 event.
