= Izabela Campos =

Brazilian Paralympic athlete (born 1981)

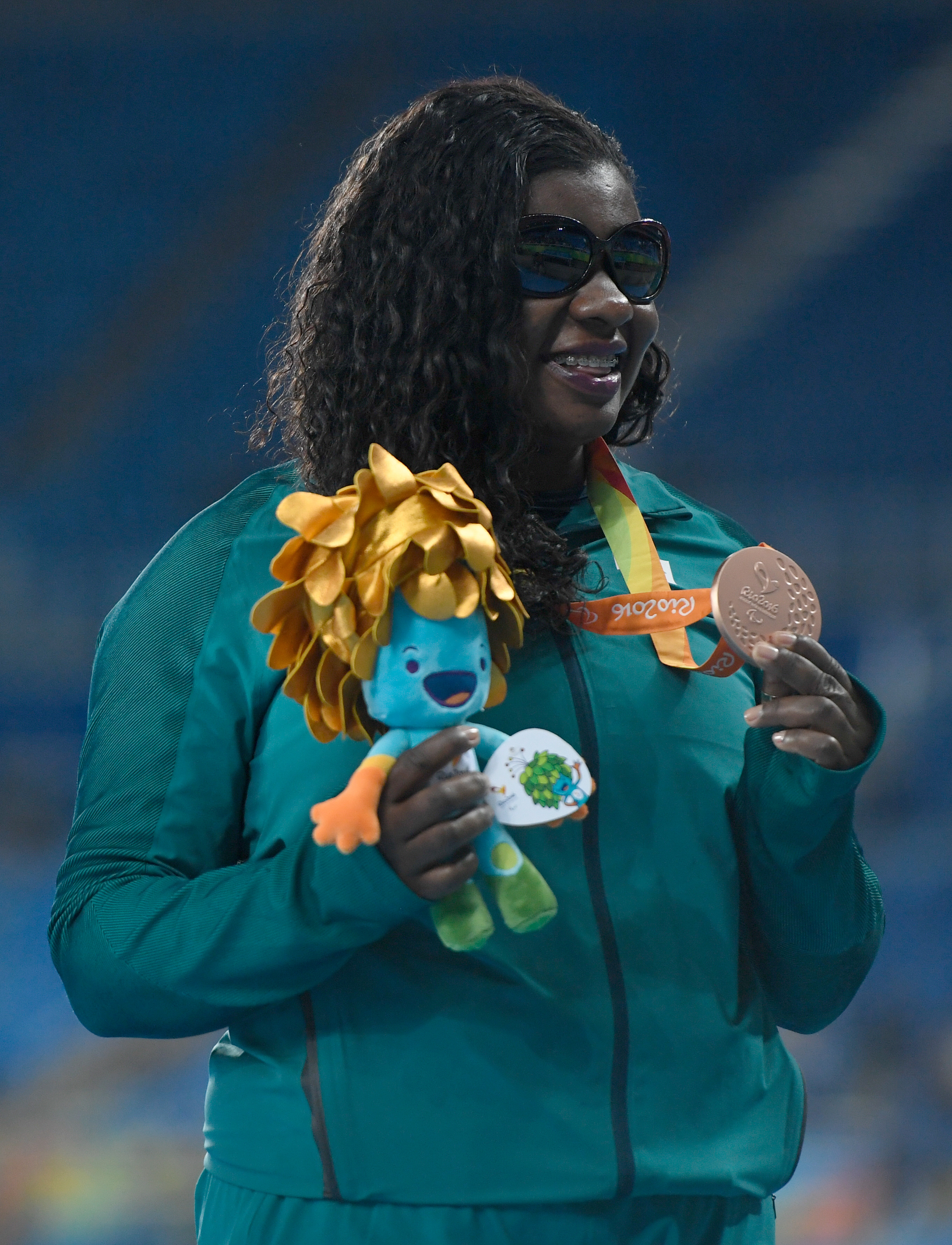
- Rio 2016

Personal information
- Full name: Izabela Silva Campos
- Born: 11 April 1981 (age 45) Belo Horizonte, Brazil
- Height: 1.66 m (5 ft 5 in)

Sport
- Country: Brazil
- Sport: Para-athletics
- Disability class: F11, F12
- Events: Shot Put, and Discus

Achievements and titles
- Paralympic finals: 2012, 2016, 2020
Medal record
Paralympic Games
Bronze medal – third place	2016 Rio de Janeiro	Discus throw F11
Parapan American Games
Gold medal – first place	2019 Lima	Discus throw F11
Gold medal – first place	2023 Santiago	Discus throw F11
Bronze medal – third place	2019 Lima	Shot put F12

Izabela Silva Campos (Note: This name uses Portuguese naming customs: the first or maternal family name is Silva and the second or paternal family name is Campos.) (born 11 April 1981) is a Brazilian visually impaired F11/12 shot putter and discus thrower. She won a bronze medal in the discus throw at the 2016 Summer Paralympics. She qualified for the 2020 Summer Paralympics, in Women's discus throw.

== Personal life ==
Campos lost her sight when she was five after having measles.

== Career ==
Campos competed at the 2012 Summer Paralympics in London in the women's shot put. That event was won by Assunta Legnante. She won a silver in the javelin. At the 2016 Paralympics in Rio she threw her discus 32.60 m to get a bronze medal. She missed out to Liangmin Zhang (36.65 m) from China and Tang Hongxia (35.01 m).

She competed at the 2019 Parapan American Games, winning gold in Discus, and bronze in Javelin, and Shot put. She came twelfth in the shot put at the 2019 World Para Athletics Championships in Dubai but she took the bronze in the F11 Women's discus throw. She qualified for the 2020 Summer Paralympics, in Women's discus throw. Campos trains with other leading athletes at the Federal University of Minas. Gerais. At the 2023 Parapan American Games Brazil sent a large team of 123 women and 190 men. Campos took a gold in the F11 Discus and shot put.

In 2024 she competed in Paris at her fourth paralympics. Brazil sent four athletes: Campos, shot putter Ana Caroline da Silva, Arthur Xavier Ribeiro and Ana Carolina Silva de Moura.
