= Yao Juan =

Chinese Paralympic athlete (born 1983)

Personal information
- Born: 18 July 1983 (age 42) Wuxi, China

Sport
- Sport: Paralympic athletics
Medal record
Paralympic athletics
Representing China
Paralympic Games
| Gold medal – first place | 2000 Sydney | Javelin throw F44 |
| Gold medal – first place | 2008 Beijing | Javelin throw F42–46 |
| Gold medal – first place | 2012 London | Shot put F42/44 |
| Gold medal – first place | 2016 Rio de Janeiro | Discus throw F44 |
| Gold medal – first place | 2020 Tokyo | Discus throw F64 |
| Gold medal – first place | 2024 Paris | Shot put F64 |
| Silver medal – second place | 2024 Paris | Discus throw F64 |
World Championships
| Gold medal – first place | 2002 Lille | Javelin throw F42–46 |
| Gold medal – first place | 2006 Assen | Javelin throw F42–46 |
| Gold medal – first place | 2015 Doha | Discus throw F44 |
| Gold medal – first place | 2015 Doha | Shot put F44 |
| Gold medal – first place | 2017 London | Discus throw F44 |
| Gold medal – first place | 2019 Dubai | Discus throw F44 |
| Gold medal – first place | 2019 Dubai | Shot put F44 |
| Gold medal – first place | 2023 Paris | Discus throw F64 |
| Gold medal – first place | 2023 Paris | Shot put F64 |
| Gold medal – first place | 2024 Kobe | Shot put F64 |
| Silver medal – second place | 2017 London | Shot put F44 |
| Silver medal – second place | 2025 New Delhi | Shot put F44 |
| Bronze medal – third place | 2025 New Delhi | Discus throw F44 |
Asian Para Games
| Gold medal – first place | 2014 Incheon | Shot put F44 |
| Gold medal – first place | 2018 Jakarta | Discus throw F43/44/62/64 |
| Gold medal – first place | 2018 Jakarta | Shot put F43/44/62/64 |
| Gold medal – first place | 2022 Hangzhou | Shot put F64 |
| Gold medal – first place | 2022 Hangzhou | Discus throw F64 |
| Bronze medal – third place | 2010 Guangzhou | Shot put F42/44/46 |

Yao Juan (Chinese: 姚娟; pinyin: Yáo Juān; born July 18, 1983) is a Paralympian athlete from China competing mainly in category F43/44/62/64 Javelin Throw, Shot Put and Discus Throw events.

== Career ==
She won a gold medal at the 2000 paralympics in the F44 Javelin. She has competed in five other Paralympics 2004, 2008, 2012, 2016 & 2020 and she won five gold medals. She also won ten medals, including nine gold medals, at the World Para Athletics Championships.
