= Faustyna Kotłowska =

Polish Paralympic athlete (born 2001)

Personal information
- Nickname: Fisia
- Born: 24 March 2001 (age 25) Kościerzyna, Poland

Sport
- Country: Poland
- Sport: Paralympic athletics
- Disability class: F64
- Event(s): Discus throw Javelin throw Shot put
- Club: UKS Olimpijcyk Skorzewo; START Gorzow Wielkopolski
- Coached by: Leszek Zblewski; Zbigniew Lewkowicz
Medal record
Paralympic athletics
Representing Poland
World Championships
Gold medal – first place	2025 New Delhi	Discus throw F64
Gold medal – first place	2025 New Delhi	Shot put F64
Silver medal – second place	2019 Dubai	Shot put F64
Silver medal – second place	2023 Paris	Discus throw F64
Bronze medal – third place	2019 Dubai	Discus throw F64
World Junior Championships
Gold medal – first place	2019 Nottwil	Discus throw F64
Gold medal – first place	2019 Nottwil	Shot put F64
European Championships
Bronze medal – third place	2018 Berlin	Discus throw F64

Faustyna Kotłowska (born 24 March 2001) is a Polish Paralympic athlete who competes in discus throw, javelin throw and shot put events in international level events.

== Personal life ==
Kotłowska sustained a serious leg injury in March 2016 when she was involved in an accident. She wears a prosthetic when participating in sporting events.
