= Maryam Al-Zeyoudi =

Emirati Paralympic athlete (born 1995)

Personal information
- Born: 2 August 1995 (age 31) Khor Fakkan, United Arab Emirates

Sport
- Sport: Paralympic athletics
Medal record
Representing United Arab Emirates
World Championships
Gold medal – first place	2024 Kobe	Shot put F40
Asian Para Games
Gold medal – first place	2022 Hangzhou	Discus throw F40/41
Silver medal – second place	2022 Hangzhou	Shot put F40/41

Maryam Ahmed Al-Zeyoudi (born 2 August 1995) is an Emirati Paralympic athlete who competes at international track and field competitions. She is a World and Asian Para Games champion in shot put and discus throw. She has competed at the 2020 and 2024 Summer Paralympics.
