= Érica Castaño =

Colombian para-athlete

Personal information
- Full name: Érica María Castaño Salazar
- Nationality: Colombian
- Born: 9 October 1985 (age 41) Medellín, Colombia

Sport
- Country: Colombia
- Sport: Para-athletics
- Disability class: F55
- Events: Discus throw; Javelin throw; Shot put
Medal record
Women's para-athletics
Representing Colombia
Event	1st	2nd	3rd
Paralympic Games	1	0	0
World Championships	2	4	0
Parapan American Games	1	2	2
Total	4	6	2
Paralympic Games
Gold medal – first place	2024 Paris	Discus throw F55
World Championships
Gold medal – first place	2019 Dubai	Discus throw F55
Gold medal – first place	2024 Kobe	Discus throw F55
Silver medal – second place	2017 London	Shot put F55
Silver medal – second place	2017 London	Discus throw F55
Silver medal – second place	2023 Paris	Discus throw F55
Silver medal – second place	2025 New Delhi	Discus throw F55
Parapan American Games
Gold medal – first place	2023 Santiago	Discus throw F54
Silver medal – second place	2015 Toronto	Javelin throw F55/56
Silver medal – second place	2019 Lima	Discus throw F55
Bronze medal – third place	2015 Toronto	Shot put F53/54/55
Bronze medal – third place	2015 Toronto	Discus throw F53/54/55

Érica María Castaño Salazar (Note: In this Spanish name, the first or paternal surname is Castaño and the second or maternal family name is Salazar.) (born 9 October 1985) is a Colombian para-athlete, who competes in the F55 category, which is for seated athletes with no leg function, partial upper body function and full arm function.

== Background ==
Castaño has a spinal cord injury after she was shot at a shopping mall in Medellín, Colombia in December 2008. Her brother, Carlos Rousselvelt, is also a para-athlete, and has the same injury after a similar incident five months earlier. She began para-athletics in 2014, and made her international debut during the 2015 Parapan American Games. She is married to Edward Ortiz, and works as a lawyer.

== Career ==
Castaño participated in the 2015 Parapan American Games, where she won three medals. In shot put she won bronze in class F53/54/55, and in discus she won bronze in class F54/55. In the javelin throw, she won silver, only beaten by Angela Madsen of the United States. The following year, she participated in the 2016 Summer Paralympics, where she came fourth in the discus (F55) and eighth in the javelin throw (F56).

Castaño participated in the 2017 World Para Athletics Championships in Athletics in London, where she won silver in the shot put in the F55 class, behind Diāna Dadzīte of Latvia, and she won silver in the discus throw, where Dadzite also won this class. There, she set area records for the Americas in the discus with 21.30 metres, and in the shot put with 7.77 metres.

Castaño participated in the 2019 Parapan American Games in Lima, Peru, and came second in discus in the F55 class, behind Rosa Maria Guerrero from Mexico. In the javelin throw she came fourth, and in the shot put she came fifth.

At the 2024 Summer Paralympics, Castano won the F55 Discus event with a throw of 26.70 metres.
