= Jennifer Brown (athlete) =

Canadian Paralympic athlete (born 1980)

Personal information
- Nicknames: Jenn, JB
- Born: June 28, 1980 (age 46) Calgary, Alberta
- Education: University of Saskatchewan
- Height: 180 cm (5 ft 11 in)

Sport
- Country: Canada
- Sport: Paralympic athletics
- Disability: Multiple sclerosis
- Disability class: F38
- Event: Discus throw
Medal record
Paralympic athletics
Representing Canada
Parapan American Games
Gold medal – first place	2015 Toronto	Women's shot put F38
Gold medal – first place	2019 Lima	Women's discus throw F38
Silver medal – second place	2015 Toronto	Women's discus throw F38

Jennifer Brown (born June 28, 1980) is a Canadian Paralympic athlete who competes in discus throw and javelin throw at international elite events.

Brown was diagnosed with multiple sclerosis in 2006 after graduating in University of Saskatchewan.
