= Jessica Heims =

American Paralympic athlete (born 1998)

Personal information
- Nickname: Jessie
- Born: 11 December 1998 (age 27) Cedar Rapids, Iowa, United States
- Height: 1.73 m (5 ft 8 in)
- Weight: 61 kg (134 lb)

Sport
- Country: United States
- Sport: Paralympic athletics
- Disability: Amniotic band syndrome
- Disability class: T64
- Event: Discus throw
- Club: University of Northern Iowa Track Team, Cedar Falls, Iowa
- Coached by: Bill Calloway; Dave Paulsen
Medal record
Women's para athletics
Representing the United States
World Championships
Silver medal – second place	2025 New Delhi	Discus throw F64
Parapan American Games
Gold medal – first place	2019 Lima	Discus throw F64
World Junior Championship
Gold medal – first place	2017 Nottwil	Discus throw F44
Bronze medal – third place	2017 Nottwil	200m T44

Jessica Heims (born 11 December 1998) is an American Paralympics athlete who competes in discus throw events. She is currently the world record holder in the discus throw in her sports category.

== Personal life ==
Heims was born with amniotic band syndrome and had her left leg amputated below the knee aged one year old.
