= Büşra Nur Tırıklı =

Turkish Paralympic athlete

Personal information
- Nationality: Turkish
- Born: 7 December 1994 (age 31)

Sport
- Country: Turkey
- Sport: Para-athletics
- Disability class: F11
- Event: Discus throw
- Club: Gaziantep BB Disabled SK
Medal record
Women's discus throw
Representing Turkey
European Para Athletics Championships
Gold medal – first place	2021 Bydgoszcz	Discus throw F11 CR
Silver medal – second place	2016 Grosseto	Discus throw F11

Büşra Nur Tırıklı (born 7 December 1994) is a Turkish Paralympian athlete competing in the F11 disability class of discus throw event. She is a member of Gaziantep BB Disabled SK.

She won the silver medal in the discus throw F11/12 event at the 2016 IPC Athletics European Championships held in Grosseto, Italy.

She competed in the discus throw F11 at the 2016 Paralympics in Rio de Janeiro, Brazil after receiving a special invitation. AT the 2021 World Para Athletics European Championships in Bydgoszcz, Poland, she won the gold medal in the discus throw F11 event, and set a new championship record with 34.12 m (111.9 ft).
