= Zhang Liangmin =

Chinese Paralympic athlete (born 1985)

Personal information
- Born: 12 October 1985 (age 40) Shanghai, China

Sport
- Sport: Paralympic athletics
Medal record
Paralympic athletics
Representing China
Paralympic Games
Gold medal – first place	2012 London	Discus throw F11–12
Gold medal – first place	2016 Rio de Janeiro	Discus throw F11–12
Gold medal – first place	2020 Tokyo	Discus throw F11
Gold medal – first place	2024 Paris	Discus throw F11
Silver medal – second place	2008 Beijing	Discus throw F12–13
Bronze medal – third place	2012 London	Shot put F11–12
World Championships
Gold medal – first place	2011 Christchurch	Shot put F11
Gold medal – first place	2015 Doha	Javelin throw F11
Gold medal – first place	2017 London	Discus throw F11
Silver medal – second place	2011 Christchurch	Discus throw F11
Silver medal – second place	2013 Lyon	Shot put F11
Silver medal – second place	2013 Lyon	Discus throw F11/12
Silver medal – second place	2019 Dubai	Discus throw F11
Bronze medal – third place	2015 Doha	Javelin throw F11
Asian Para Games
Gold medal – first place	2010 Guangzhou	Shot put F12
Gold medal – first place	2014 Incheon	Discus throw F11/12
Gold medal – first place	2014 Incheon	Shot put F11/12
Gold medal – first place	2018 Jakarta	Discus throw F11
Gold medal – first place	2022 Hangzhou	Discus throw F11
Silver medal – second place	2018 Jakarta	Shot put F11/12

Zhang Liangmin (Chinese: 张亮敏; pinyin: Zhāng Liàngmǐn; born October 12, 1985) is a blind Paralympian athlete from China competing mainly in throwing events.

She competed in the 2008 Summer Paralympics in Beijing, China. There she won a silver medal in the women's F12–13 discus throw event and also competed in the F12/13 shot put.

In the 2016 Summer Paralympics in Rio she took a gold medal in the discus after a throw of 36.65 metres. Silver medalist Tang Hongxia threw 35.01 metres and Izabela Campos took the bronze with a throw of 32.60 metres.

In 2017 she won the F11 discus and F11/F12 shot put events at the World Para Athletics Grand Prix in Beijing.

In the 2020 Summer Paralympics in Tokyo she took a gold medal in the Discus Throw F11 with a world record of 40.83 metres.
