= 2018 World Para Athletics European Championships – Women's shot put =

The women's shot put at the 2018 World Para Athletics European Championships was held at the Friedrich-Ludwig-Jahn-Sportpark in Berlin from 20 to 26 August. 12 classification finals are held in all over this event.

== Medalists ==
| Event | Gold | | Silver | | Bronze | |
|---|---|---|---|---|---|---|
| F12 | Assunta Legnante (ITA) | 15.85 | Orysia Ilchyna (UKR) | 12.68 | Tamara Sivakova (BLR) | 11.31 |
| F20 | Sabrina Fortune (GBR) | 13.30 CR | Ewa Durska (POL) | 12.93 | Anastasiia Mysnyk (UKR) | 12.46 |
| F32 | Anastasiia Moskalenko (UKR) | 5.65 CR | Maria Stamatoula (GRE) | 5.27 | Hanna Wichmann (GER) | 4.45 |
| F33 | Lucyna Kornobys (POL) | 7.49 WR | Joanna Oleksiuk (POL) | 5.59 | Anthi Liagkou (GRE) | 4.59 |
| F34 | Vanessa Wallace (GBR) | 7.45 | Marie Brämer-Skowronek (GER) | 6.93 | Charleen Kosche (GER) | 6.74 |
| F35 | Mariia Pomazan (UKR) | 11.42 | Klaudia Maliszewska (POL) | 8.32 | Anna Luxová (CZE) | 8.10 |
| F37 | Birgit Kober (GER) | 11.79 WR | Eva Datinska (CZE) | 10.79 | Juliane Mogge (GER) | 9.46 |
| F40 | Renata Śliwińska (POL) | 8.50 WR | Lara Baars (NED) | 6.78 | Petra Struklec (CRO) | 4.83 |
| F41 | Rose Vandegou (FRA) | 7.19 ER | Marijana Goranovic (MNE) | 6.56 | Rabia Cirit (TUR) | 6.20 |
| F54 | Yuliya Nezhura (BLR) | 6.10 | Iana Lebiedieva (UKR) | 5.43 | Eva Kacanu (CZE) | 5.02 |
| F55 | Diana Dadzite (LAT) | 8.00 | Daniela Todorova (BUL) | 6.86 | Karolina Strawinska (POL) | 6.00 |
| F57 | Ivanka Koleva (BUL) | 8.02 | Martina Willing (GER) | 7.60 | no medal awarded. | |
WR world record | AR area record | CR championship record | GR games record | NR national record | OR Olympic record | PB personal best | SB season best | WL world leading (in a given season)

== Results ==
=== F12 ===
| Rank | Athlete | Result | Notes |
|---|---|---|---|
| 1st place, gold medalist(s) | Assunta Legnante; Italy | 15.85 | |
| 2nd place, silver medalist(s) | Orysia Ilchyna; Ukraine | 12.68 | |
| 3rd place, bronze medalist(s) | Tamara Sivakova; Belarus | 11.31 | |
| 4 | Rose Welepa; France | 10.19 | |

=== F20 ===
| Rank | Athlete | Result | Notes |
|---|---|---|---|
| 1st place, gold medalist(s) | Sabrina Fortune; United Kingdom | 13.30 | CR |
| 2nd place, silver medalist(s) | Ewa Durska; Poland | 12.93 | |
| 3rd place, bronze medalist(s) | Anastasiia Mysnyk; Ukraine | 12.46 | |
| 4 | Zoi Mantoudi; Greece | 12.29 | |
| 5 | Valasia Kyrgiovanaki; Greece | 12.16 | |
| 6 | Mihriban Kaya; Turkey | 11.41 | |
| 7 | Hulda Sigurjonsdottir; Iceland | 9.40 | |

=== F32 ===
| Rank | Athlete | Result | Notes |
|---|---|---|---|
| 1st place, gold medalist(s) | Anastasiia Moskalenko; Ukraine | 5.65 | CR |
| 2nd place, silver medalist(s) | Maria Stamatoula; Greece | 5.27 | |
| 3rd place, bronze medalist(s) | Hanna Wichmann; Germany | 4.45 | |
| 4 | Noemi Szigeti; Hungary | 3.22 | |
| 5 | Krisztina Kalman; Hungary | 3.20 | |

=== F33 ===
| Rank | Athlete | Result | Notes |
|---|---|---|---|
| 1st place, gold medalist(s) | Lucyna Kornobys; Poland | 7.49 | WR |
| 2nd place, silver medalist(s) | Joanna Oleksiuk; Poland | 5.59 | |
| 3rd place, bronze medalist(s) | Anthi Liagkou; Greece | 4.59 | |
| 4 | Dorota Szymula; Poland | 4.16 | |
| 5 | Anna Marcanikova; Czech Republic | 4.04 | |

=== F34 ===
| Rank | Athlete | Result | Notes |
|---|---|---|---|
| 1st place, gold medalist(s) | Vanessa Wallace; United Kingdom | 7.45 | SB |
| 2nd place, silver medalist(s) | Marie Brämer-Skowronek; Germany | 6.93 | |
| 3rd place, bronze medalist(s) | Charleen Kosche; Germany | 6.74 | |
| 4 | Frances Herrmann; Germany | 6.71 | |
| 5 | Taiga Kantāne; Latvia | 6.55 | |

=== F35 ===
| Rank | Athlete | Result | Notes |
|---|---|---|---|
| 1st place, gold medalist(s) | Mariia Pomazan; Ukraine | 11.42 | |
| 2nd place, silver medalist(s) | Klaudia Maliszewska; Poland | 8.32 | |
| 3rd place, bronze medalist(s) | Anna Luxová; Czech Republic | 8.10 | |
| 4 | Aikaterini El Latif; Greece | 6.18 | |

=== F36/37 ===
| Rank | Athlete | Result | Notes |
|---|---|---|---|
| 1st place, gold medalist(s) | Brigit Kober; Germany | 11.79 | WR |
| 2nd place, silver medalist(s) | Eva Datinska; Czech Republic | 10.79 | |
| 3rd place, bronze medalist(s) | Juliane Mogge; Germany | 9.46 | |
| 4 | Cheyenne Bouthoorn; Netherlands | 7.23 | |

=== F40 ===
| Rank | Athlete | Result | Notes |
|---|---|---|---|
| 1st place, gold medalist(s) | Renata Śliwińska; Poland | 8.50 | WR |
| 2nd place, silver medalist(s) | Lara Baars; Netherlands | 6.78 | |
| 3rd place, bronze medalist(s) | Petra Struklec; Croatia | 4.83 | |
| 4 | Oxana Spataru; Moldova | 4.77 | |

=== F41 ===
| Rank | Athlete | Result | Notes |
|---|---|---|---|
| 1st place, gold medalist(s) | Rose Vandegou; France | 7.19 | ER |
| 2nd place, silver medalist(s) | Marijana Goranovic; Montenegro | 6.56 | |
| 3rd place, bronze medalist(s) | Rabia Cirit; Turkey | 6.20 | |
| 4 | Ana Gradecak; Croatia | 5.96 | |

=== F54 ===
| Rank | Athlete | Result | Notes |
|---|---|---|---|
| 1st place, gold medalist(s) | Yuliya Nezhura; Belarus | 6.10 | |
| 2nd place, silver medalist(s) | Iana Lebiedieva; Ukraine | 5.43 | |
| 3rd place, bronze medalist(s) | Eva Kacanu; Czech Republic | 5.02 | |
| 4 | Maja Rajkovic; Montenegro | 4.48 | |
| 5 | Svitlana Stetsiuk; Ukraine | 4.34 | |

=== F55 ===
| Rank | Athlete | Result | Notes |
|---|---|---|---|
| 1st place, gold medalist(s) | Diana Dadzite; Latvia | 8.00 | |
| 2nd place, silver medalist(s) | Daniela Todorova; Bulgaria | 6.86 | |
| 3rd place, bronze medalist(s) | Karolina Strawinska; Poland | 6.00 | |
| 4 | Iryna Baranovskaya; Belarus | 5.43 | |

=== F57 ===
| Rank | Athlete | Result | Notes |
|---|---|---|---|
| 1st place, gold medalist(s) | Ivanka Koleva; Bulgaria | 8.02 | |
| 2nd place, silver medalist(s) | Martina Willing; Germany | 7.60 | |
| – | Jelena Vukovic; Croatia | NM | |
| – | Miroslava Obrova; Czech Republic | DNS | |

== See also ==
- List of IPC world records in athletics

== See also ==
- List of IPC world records in athletics
