= Uzbekistan at the 2025 World Para Athletics Championships =

- IPC code: UZB
- NPC: National Paralympic Committee of Uzbekistan
- Website: paralympic.uz

in New Delhi, India September 27, 2025 – October 5, 2025
- Medals: Gold 0 Silver 0 Bronze 0 Total 0

Summer appearances
- 2025

Uzbekistan is participating in the 2025 World Para Athletics Championships, being held in New Delhi, India from 27 September to 5 October 2025.

== Track events ==
Legend:

- Note – Ranks given for track events are only within the athlete's heat.
- Q = Qualified for the next round
- q = Qualified for the next round as the fastest loser or, in field events, by position without achieving the qualifying target.
- DSQ = Disqualified
- DNF = Did Not Finish
- WR = World Record
- CR = Championship Record
- AR = Area (or Continental) Record
- PB = Personal Best
- SB = Season's Best

=== Men ===
Athlete	Event	Heats		Semi-final		Final	
Athlete	Event	Result	Rank	Result	Rank	Result	Rank
Izzat Turgunov	100m T36	12.82 SB	6	Did not advance to next round			
Fakhriddin Khamraev	400m T12	49.86 SB	1Q	—N/a			
Marufjon Murodulloev	400m T47	51.31 SB	4	Did not advance to next round			

=== Women ===
Athlete	Event	Heats		Semi-final		Final	
Athlete	Event	Result	Rank	Result	Rank	Result	Rank

== Field events ==
Legend:

- Note – Ranks given for track events are only within the athlete's heat.
- Q = Qualified for the next round
- q = Qualified for the next round as the fastest loser or, in field events, by position without achieving the qualifying target.
- DSQ = Disqualified
- WR = World Record
- CR = Championship Record
- PB = Personal Best
- SB = Season's Best

=== Men ===
Athlete	Event	Qualification		Final	
Athlete	Event	Result	Rank	Result	Rank
Abdulazizkhon Abdukhakimov	Club Throw F32	—N/a		32.27 SB	6
Kudratillokhon Marufkhujaev	Discus Throw F37	—N/a		44.84	9
Tolibboy Yuldashev	Discus Throw F37	—N/a		50.81 SB	5
Ilkhomjon Turgunov	Discus Throw F57	40.43	2q	39.49	9
Yorkinbek Odilov	Discus Throw F57	44.44 ~~SB~~	1q	45.05 SB	4
Elyorbek Elmatov	Javelin Throw F46	—N/a		47.49 PB	11
Muzrobjon Ganiev	Javelin Throw F46	—N/a		55.05 PB	8
Yorkinbek Odilov	Javelin Throw F57	—N/a		52.06; AS PB	2nd place, silver medalist(s)
Doston Kahhorov	Long Jump T37	—N/a		5.62 PB	12
Sodikjon Mamadiev	Long Jump T37	—N/a		5.17 SB	13
Omadbek Khasanov	Long Jump T47	—N/a		7.10 SB	4
Jasur Khodjaev	Shot Put F32	—N/a		9.96 SB	1st place, gold medalist(s)
Barotjon Bakhtiyorov	Shot Put F36	—N/a		13.74 PB	6
Kudratillokhon Marufkhujaev	Shot Put F37	—N/a		13.21	10
Tolibboy Yuldashev	Shot Put F37	—N/a		15.86 PB	3rd place, bronze medalist(s)
Bobirjon Omonov	Shot Put F41	—N/a		12.36	2nd place, silver medalist(s)
Boburjon Isomiddinov	Shot Put F41	—N/a		9.79 PB	8
Yorkinbek Odilov	Shot Put F57	13.08 PB	3q		

=== Women ===
Athlete	Event	Qualification		Final	
Athlete	Event	Result	Rank	Result	Rank
Makhliyo Akramova	Club Throw F32	23.77 ~~PB~~	1q	23.82 PB	6
Shahrizoda Temirova	Discus Throw F11	—N/a		26.10 PB	7
Kubaro Khakimova	Discus Throw F41	—N/a		27.85 PB	5
Madina Mukhtorova	Discus Throw F41	—N/a		20.20	12
Navruza Akhmatova	Discus Throw F41	—N/a		28.83; AS PB	3rd place, bronze medalist(s)
Angelina Kolesnikova	Discus Throw F44	—N/a		24.48 PB	8
Husnorakhon Kudratullaeva	Javelin Throw F46	—N/a		39.57 PB	4
Karomat Omonova	Javelin Throw F46	—N/a		38.56 PB	6
Shahinakhon Yigitalieva	Javelin Throw F46	—N/a		41.97 SB	2nd place, silver medalist(s)
Yokutkhon Kholbekova	Long Jump T12	—N/a		5.54 SB	1st place, gold medalist(s)
Zokhira Kozokova	Shot Put F37	—N/a		9.17 PB	9
Kubaro Khakimova	Shot Put F41	—N/a		10.17 SB	2nd place, silver medalist(s)
Navruza Akhmatova	Shot Put F41	—N/a		9.49 PB	4
Angelina Kolesnikova	Shot Put F44	—N/a		9.33 PB	7
Karomat Omonova	Shot Put F46	—N/a		13.07; AS PB	1st place, gold medalist(s)
Shahinakhon Yigitalieva	Shot Put F46	—N/a		9.04	10
