= 2018 World Para Athletics European Championships – Women's discus throw =

The women's discus throw at the 2018 World Para Athletics European Championships was held at the Friedrich-Ludwig-Jahn-Sportpark in Berlin from 20 to 26 August. 7 classification finals are held in all over this event.

== Medalists ==
Event	Gold		Silver		Bronze	
F12	Orysia Ilchyna (UKR)	40.38	Tamara Sivakova (BLR)	38.63	Rose Wélépa (FRA)	30.41
F38	Noelle Lenihan (IRL)	32.95 WR	Eva Datinska (CZE)	27.29	Ingrīda Priede (LAT)	25.52
F41	Niamh McCarthy (IRL)	31.76 ER	Renata Śliwińska (POL)	21.54	Lara Baars (NED)	20.47
F53	Iana Lebiedieva (UKR)	14.93 WR	Zoia Ovsii (UKR)	13.04	Svitlana Stetsiuk (UKR)	10.47
F55	Diāna Dadzīte (LAT)	22.46	Daniela Todorova (BUL)	18.45	Katerina Novakova (CZE)	16.13
F57	Orla Barry (IRL)	28.76	Martina Willing (GER)	20.53	Ivanka Koleva (BUL)	19.95
F64	Ida Nesse (NOR)	34.08	Kristel Walther (DEN)	31.55	Faustyna Kotłowska (POL)	26.28
WR world record | AR area record | CR championship record | GR games record | NR national record | OR Olympic record | PB personal best | SB season best | WL world leading (in a given season)

== See also ==
- List of IPC world records in athletics

== See also ==
- List of IPC world records in athletics
