= 2025 World Para Athletics Championships – Women's shot put =

The women's shot put events at the 2025 World Para Athletics Championships were held at the Jawaharlal Nehru Stadium, Delhi in New Delhi.

== Medalists ==
Event	Gold	Silver	Bronze
F12	Assunta Legnante; Italy	Zhao Yuping; China	Lydia Church; Great Britain
F20	Sabrina Fortune; Great Britain	Ebrar Keskin; Turkey	Aleksandra Zaitseva; Neutral Paralympic Athletes
F32	Wanna Brito; Brazil	Anastasiia Moskalenko; Ukraine	Evgeniia Galaktionova; Neutral Paralympic Athletes
F33	Svetlana Krivenok; Neutral Paralympic Athletes	Wu Qing; China	Julia Hanes; Canada
F34	Zou Lijuan; China	Lucyna Kornobys; Poland	Galina Lipatnikova; Neutral Paralympic Athletes
F35	Mariia Pomazan; Ukraine	Wang Jun; China	Anna Nicholson; Great Britain
F36	Cheyenne Bouthoorn; Netherlands	Kirra Wright; Australia	—N/a
F37	Lisa Adams; New Zealand	Irina Vertinskaya; Neutral Paralympic Athletes	Mi Na; China
F40	Lara Baars; Netherlands	Madina Mukhtorova; Uzbekistan	Raja Jebali; Tunisia
F41	Mayerli Buitrago Ariza; Colombia	Kubaro Khakimova; Uzbekistan	Raoua Tlili; Tunisia
F44	Arelle Middleton; United States	Yao Juan; China	Funmi Oduwaiye; Great Britain
F46	Karomat Omonova; Uzbekistan	Holly Robinson; New Zealand	Katie Pegg; Canada
F54	Gloria Zarza Guadarrama; Mexico	Elizabeth Rodrigues Gomes; Brazil	Elham Salehi; Iran
F57	Safia Djelal; Algeria	Nassima Saifi; Algeria	Tian Yuxin; China
F64	Faustyna Kotłowska; Poland	Alexandra Nouchet; France	Alicia Guerrero; United States

== F12 ==
Final

The event took place on 4 October.

Rank	Name	Nationality	Сlass	#1	#2	#3	#4	#5	#6	Result	Notes
1st place, gold medalist(s)	Assunta Legnante	Italy	F11	14.05	13.82	14.44	x	11.53	13.82	14.44	
2nd place, silver medalist(s)	Zhao Yuping	China	F12	12.05	12.38	12.28	12.37	12.07	12.67	12.67	SB
3rd place, bronze medalist(s)	Lydia Church	Great Britain	F12	11.66	11.25	11.51	12.60	x	12.34	12.60	
4	Serap Demirkapu	Turkey	F12	x	9.76	9.23	10.97	11.37	11.41	11.41	PB
5	Elena Shakh	Neutral Paralympic Athletes	F11	11.04	11.25	x	10.89	11.11	10.20	11.25	SB
6	Xue Enhui	China	F11	10.76	9.94	10.20	x	9.25	x	10.76	SB
7	Liu Ya-ting	Chinese Taipei	F12	9.89	10.20	10.26	10.47	x	10.62	10.62	SB
8	Izabela Campos	Brazil	F11	9.70	10.51	x	x	x	9.65	10.51	
9	Yokutkhon Kholbekova	Uzbekistan	F12	7.73	8.20	8.86				8.86	SB

== F20 ==
Final

The event took place on 29 September.

Rank	Name	Nationality	Сlass	#1	#2	#3	#4	#5	#6	Result	Notes
1st place, gold medalist(s)	Sabrina Fortune	Great Britain	F20	16.75	13.99	14.68	15.21	14.81	15.71	16.75	WR
2nd place, silver medalist(s)	Ebrar Keskin	Turkey	F20	13.80	12.65	13.37	x	13.32	12.94	13.80	SB
3rd place, bronze medalist(s)	Aleksandra Zaitseva	Neutral Paralympic Athletes	F20	12.35	12.91	13.20	12.63	13.40	13.74	13.74	PB
4	Anaís Méndez	Ecuador	F20	13.05	13.32	13.00	13.74	12.96	12.79	13.74	SB
5	Svetlana Mironova	Neutral Paralympic Athletes	F20	13.22	13.29	12.98	13.70	13.66	13.32	13.70	
6	Gloria Agblemagnon	Italy	F20	11.40	x	13.35	13.64	13.17	13.30	13.64	SB
7	Grecely Padilla	Ecuador	F20	12.30	x	12.31	12.82	12.63	12.99	12.99	SB
8	Antonina Baranova	Neutral Paralympic Athletes	F20	11.66	12.13	12.16	x	x	12.00	12.16	SB
9	Beatrice Aoustin	France	F20	10.97	11.47	11.39				11.47	SB
10	Reina Hori	Japan	F20	11.21	11.28	11.13				11.28	
11	Suparni Yati	Indonesia	F20	9.97	10.58	10.29				10.58	SB

== F32 ==
Final

The event took place on 2 October.

Rank	Name	Nationality	Сlass	#1	#2	#3	#4	#5	#6	Result	Notes
1st place, gold medalist(s)	Wanna Brito	Brazil	F32	x	7.66	7.86	8.43	8.00	8.49	8.49	WR
2nd place, silver medalist(s)	Anastasiia Moskalenko	Ukraine	F32	7.43	7.48	x	8.07	7.78	7.90	8.07	ER
3rd place, bronze medalist(s)	Evgeniia Galaktionova	Neutral Paralympic Athletes	F32	7.57	7.51	7.58	7.44	7.57	7.56	7.58	SB
4	Nargiza Safarova	Neutral Paralympic Athletes	F32	6.08	x	x	6.49	6.23	5.83	6.49	PB
5	Maroua Brahmi	Tunisia	F32	5.84	5.61	5.61	5.90	5.65	5.74	5.90	
6	Giovanna Boscolo	Brazil	F32	5.60	5.09	5.25	5.63	5.57	5.44	5.63	
7	Mounia Gasmi	Algeria	F32	4.99	x	x	x	5.46	5.19	5.46	
8	Noura Alktebi	United Arab Emirates	F32	x	5.39	5.27	x	5.27	5.18	5.39	
9	Lea Majernikova	Slovakia	F32	4.64	4.97	4.98	5.12	4.81	4.88	5.12	SB
	Róża Kozakowska	Italy	F32	DNS							

== F33 ==
Final

The event took place on 3 October.

Rank	Name	Nationality	Сlass	#1	#2	#3	#4	#5	#6	Result	Notes
1st place, gold medalist(s)	Svetlana Krivenok	Neutral Paralympic Athletes	F33	7.65	7.79	x	7.51	7.78	8.14	8.14	CR
2nd place, silver medalist(s)	Wu Qing	China	F33	7.41	7.56	6.93	7.50	5.98	7.03	7.56	SB
3rd place, bronze medalist(s)	Julia Hanes	Canada	F33	x	x	7.36	7.51	7.04	7.40	7.51	
4	Asmahan Boudjadar	Algeria	F33	7.06	x	6.71	6.94	6.51	7.26	7.26	SB
5	Vera Isakova	Neutral Paralympic Athletes	F33	x	6.60	x	6.82	6.60	x	6.82	PB
6	Qian Zao	China	F33	5.87	6.37	6.16	6.09	6.15	6.21	6.37	
7	Sara Hamdi Masoud	Qatar	F33	4.93	5.04	5.00	4.88	4.98	5.11	5.11	SB
	Gilda Guadalupe Cota Vera	Mexico	F33	x	x	x	x	x	x	NM	

== F34 ==
Final

The event took place on 30 September.

Rank	Name	Nationality	Сlass	#1	#2	#3	#4	#5	#6	Result	Notes
1st place, gold medalist(s)	Zou Lijuan	China	F34	9.15	8.82	8.80	9.06	8.56	8.82	9.15	SB
2nd place, silver medalist(s)	Lucyna Kornobys	Poland	F34	8.11	8.25	8.08	8.26	8.07	8.26	8.26	
3rd place, bronze medalist(s)	Galina Lipatnikova	Neutral Paralympic Athletes	F34	7.19	7.70	7.83	7.92	8.01	7.66	8.01	PB
4	Charleen Kosche	Germany	F34	7.76	7.67	7.83	7.70	7.59	7.57	7.83	PB
5	Zuo Caiyun	China	F34	7.57	7.66	7.50	7.79	7.36	7.68	7.79	PB
6	Bhagyashri Madhavrao Jadhav	India	F34	7.29	7.22	7.58	x	7.43	7.67	7.67	SB
7	Elena Orlova	Neutral Paralympic Athletes	F34	7.06	7.10	7.06	6.88	x	7.01	7.10	
8	Hadeel Al Thwai	Saudi Arabia	F34	6.41	x	6.62	6.63	6.15	6.73	6.73	PB

== F35 ==
Final

The event took place on 4 October.

Rank	Name	Nationality	Сlass	#1	#2	#3	#4	#5	#6	Result	Notes
1st place, gold medalist(s)	Mariia Pomazan	Ukraine	F35	11.92	11.67	11.55	11.70	12.04	11.97	12.04	SB
2nd place, silver medalist(s)	Wang Jun	China	F35	10.12	10.43	10.20	x	10.15	9.93	10.43	SB
3rd place, bronze medalist(s)	Anna Nicholson	Great Britain	F35	8.98	9.38	9.02	9.58	9.23	8.70	9.58	PB
4	Anna Luxová	Czech Republic	F35	8.56	x	8.52	9.03	8.99	9.18	9.18	=PB
5	Klaudia Maliszewska	Poland	F35	8.33	8.33	8.47	7.72	8.35	8.13	8.47	
6	Daria Ivanova	Neutral Paralympic Athletes	F35	7.63	7.85	7.74	8.13	7.57	7.46	8.13	
7	Oxana Corso	Italy	F35	6.77	6.99	7.09	7.65	7.18	7.22	7.65	

== F36 ==
Final

The event took place on 27 September.

Rank	Name	Nationality	Сlass	#1	#2	#3	#4	#5	#6	Result	Notes
1st place, gold medalist(s)	Cheyenne Bouthoorn	Netherlands	F36	x	9.41	9.15	9.25	9.62	9.11	9.62	PB
2nd place, silver medalist(s)	Kirra Wright	Australia	F36	6.57	7.96	x	8.30	7.57	8.08	8.30	PB
3	Kate Hwang	United States	F36	6.31	6.63	6.92	6.97	6.95	7.51	7.51	PB
4	Melany Favela	Mexico	F36	5.55	5.04	4.86	5.25	5.36	5.45	5.55	PB

== F37 ==
Final

The event took place on 28 September.

Rank	Name	Nationality	Сlass	#1	#2	#3	#4	#5	#6	Result	Notes
1st place, gold medalist(s)	Lisa Adams	New Zealand	F37	13.83	13.17	x	x	13.78	12.89	13.83	SB
2nd place, silver medalist(s)	Irina Vertinskaya	Neutral Paralympic Athletes	F37	12.95	12.31	11.95	12.86	12.85	12.55	12.95	
3rd place, bronze medalist(s)	Mi Na	China	F37	12.28	11.99	x	12.23	x	x	12.28	SB
4	Ella Hose	Australia	F37	9.76	9.30	10.56	10.75	10.80	10.40	10.80	SB
5	Carleigh Hiltz	Canada	F37	9.75	9.29	10.27	9.49	9.47	9.37	10.27	PB
6	Ingeborg Eide Garðarsdóttir	Iceland	F37	x	8.92	9.35	9.32	9.66	10.08	10.08	PB
7	Eva Berná	Czech Republic	F37	9.72	x	x	x	x	x	9.72	
8	Zokhira Kozokova	Uzbekistan	F37	8.47	8.68	8.88	8.65	9.11	9.17	9.17	PB

== F40 ==
Final

The event took place on 5 October.

Rank	Name	Nationality	Сlass	#1	#2	#3	#4	#5	#6	Result	Notes
1st place, gold medalist(s)	Lara Baars	Netherlands	F40	9.11	8.70	9.41	9.10	9.77	x	9.77	WR
2nd place, silver medalist(s)	Madina Mukhtorova	Uzbekistan	F40	7.41	8.63	8.27	8.65	6.99	8.99	8.99	AS
3rd place, bronze medalist(s)	Raja Jebali	Tunisia	F40	8.56	8.26	7.83	8.79	8.30	8.86	8.86	PB
4	Maryam Alzeyoudi	United Arab Emirates	F40	8.76	7.74	7.64	8.46	7.77	x	8.76	PB
5	Renata Śliwińska	Poland	F40	8.63	8.13	x	8.41	7.85	8.31	8.63	
6	Pauleth Mejía	Mexico	F40	7.72	7.99	8.43	8.29	8.28	8.17	8.43	
7	Rabia Cirit	Turkey	F40	7.16	7.70	7.56	x	7.64	x	7.70	SB
8	Saruultugs Dagvadorj	Mongolia	F40	4.27	5.35	5.76	6.11	6.18	x	6.18	SB
9	Diana Shaposhnikova	Kazakhstan	F40	5.47	5.40	5.62				5.62	PB
10	Oxana Spataru	Moldova	F40	5.29	5.12	5.10				5.29	

== F41 ==
Final

The event took place on 27 September.

Rank	Name	Nationality	Сlass	#1	#2	#3	#4	#5	#6	Result	Notes
1st place, gold medalist(s)	Mayerli Buitrago Ariza	Colombia	F41	9.80	x	9.96	9.64	9.69	10.21	10.21	AM
2nd place, silver medalist(s)	Kubaro Khakimova	Uzbekistan	F41	9.70	9.78	10.17	9.82	10.09	9.86	10.17	SB
3rd place, bronze medalist(s)	Raoua Tlili	Tunisia	F41	x	9.61	9.45	9.96	9.76	9.56	9.96	
4	Navruza Akhmatova	Uzbekistan	F41	9.49	9.46	9.10	8.85	8.89	9.44	9.49	PB
5	Charlotte Bolton	Canada	F41	8.62	x	x	x	8.49	9.09	9.09	
6	Isabella Michela	Chile	F41	8.41	8.45	8.41	8.14	8.71	8.37	8.71	PB
7	Amy Thompson	Great Britain	F41	8.17	7.76	8.33	7.66	7.64	7.87	8.33	
8	Ibtissame El Garaa	Morocco	F41	x	6.83	7.91	7.51	x	7.67	7.91	PB
9	Hayat El Garaa	Morocco	F41	7.34	x	7.81				7.81	
10	Estefany López	Ecuador	F41	7.60	7.72	7.29				7.72	SB

== F44 ==
Final

The event took place on 3 October.

Rank	Name	Nationality	Сlass	#1	#2	#3	#4	#5	#6	Result	Notes
1st place, gold medalist(s)	Arelle Middleton	United States	F44	12.38	12.37	12.39	12.95	12.93	12.56	12.95	
2nd place, silver medalist(s)	Yao Juan	China	F44	12.32	12.42	12.81	x	x	12.52	12.81	SB
3rd place, bronze medalist(s)	Funmi Oduwaiye	Great Britain	F44	12.11	x	x	x	x	x	12.11	PB
4	Samantha Heyison	United States	F44	11.11	10.53	11.04	10.83	10.79	11.33	11.33	
5	Lisa Martin Wagner	Germany	F44	10.35	x	10.25	x	10.51	10.28	10.51	
6	Ida Yessica Nesse	Norway	F44	9.46	x	9.16	9.29	9.57	9.41	9.57	
7	Angelina Kolesnikova	Uzbekistan	F44	8.51	8.61	9.33	8.73	8.39	8.47	9.33	PB
8	Faosia Nafula Sifuna	Kenya	F44	9.08	9.21	9.19	8.73	8.87	8.22	9.21	PB
	Osiris Aneth Machado	Mexico	F44	DNS							

== F46 ==
Final

The event took place on 2 October.

Rank	Name	Nationality	Сlass	#1	#2	#3	#4	#5	#6	Result	Notes
1st place, gold medalist(s)	Karomat Omonova	Uzbekistan	F46	x	12.88	11.97	11.85	12.09	13.07	13.07	AS
2nd place, silver medalist(s)	Holly Robinson	New Zealand	F46	12.67	12.71	12.86	12.50	12.26	12.58	12.86	OC
3rd place, bronze medalist(s)	Katie Pegg	Canada	F46	11.48	12.11	12.29	12.15	12.68	12.76	12.76	PB
4	Jihen Azaiez	Tunisia	F46	12.33	12.33	x	x	11.82	x	12.33	AF
5	Suzana Nahirnei	France	F46	11.49	11.32	10.97	11.87	12.15	12.04	12.15	
6	Shi Gaiting	China	F46	10.13	10.12	10.20	9.86	10.17	10.54	10.54	PB
7	Kim Marie Vaske	Germany	F46	9.87	10.42	10.21	10.45	10.11	10.31	10.45	
8	Martina Krog	Croatia	F46	10.11	9.79	10.07	9.87	9.71	10.08	10.11	PB
9	Amisha Rawat	India	F46	10.11	x	x				10.11	PB
10	Shahinakhon Yigitalieva	Uzbekistan	F46	9.04	8.78	r				9.04	
11	Cintia Frasquet y Sanchez	Spain	F46	8.43	8.99	x				8.99	

== F54 ==
Final

The event took place on 30 September.

Rank	Name	Nationality	Сlass	#1	#2	#3	#4	#5	#6	Result	Notes
1st place, gold medalist(s)	Gloria Zarza Guadarrama	Mexico	F54	7.64	7.73	7.89	7.89	7.95	7.97	7.97	SB
2nd place, silver medalist(s)	Elizabeth Rodrigues Gomes	Brazil	F53	7.20	7.61	7.78	7.77	7.75	7.60	7.78	CR
3rd place, bronze medalist(s)	Elham Salehi	Iran	F54	7.17	7.09	7.13	6.68	6.96	7.13	7.17	SB
4	Mariia Bogacheva	Neutral Paralympic Athletes	F54	6.74	6.58	6.56	6.81	6.71	6.85	6.85	
5	Yuliya Nezhura	Neutral Paralympic Athletes	F54	6.41	6.37	x	6.16	6.63	6.38	6.63	
6	Keerthika Jayachandran	India	F54	6.21	5.96	6.25	5.97	5.92	5.97	6.25	PB

== F57 ==
Final

The event took place on 2 October.

Rank	Name	Nationality	Сlass	#1	#2	#3	#4	#5	#6	Result	Notes
1st place, gold medalist(s)	Safia Djelal	Algeria	F57	x	x	11.59	x	11.67	x	11.67	WR
2nd place, silver medalist(s)	Nassima Saifi	Algeria	F57	10.42	10.28	x	10.45	x	x	10.45	
3rd place, bronze medalist(s)	Tian Yuxin	China	F57	x	9.99	10.20	10.28	10.35	x	10.35	PB
4	María de los Ángeles Ortiz	Mexico	F57	x	10.15	9.98	9.78	9.97	9.91	10.15	SB
5	Sharmila Dhankhar	India	F57	9.87	10.01	9.36	x	8.83	10.03	10.03	PB
6	Gabriela Navarro Rodriguez	Spain	F57	7.99	x	8.79	8.77	8.28	8.57	8.79	
7	Rooba Al-Omari	Bahrain	F55	6.82	7.19	7.16	7.24	7.44	6.97	7.44	SB

== F64 ==
Final

The event took place on 3 October.

Rank	Name	Nationality	Сlass	#1	#2	#3	#4	#5	#6	Result	Notes
1st place, gold medalist(s)	Faustyna Kotłowska	Poland	F64	10.22	10.88	10.11	10.63	10.77	10.86	10.88	CR
2nd place, silver medalist(s)	Alexandra Nouchet	France	F63	9.05	x	10.10	9.43	8.85	9.52	10.10	SB
3rd place, bronze medalist(s)	Alicia Guerrero	United States	F64	9.97	9.45	9.55	10.02	8.99	9.24	10.02	
4	Fiona Pinar Batalla	Spain	F64	8.95	9.33	9.03	x	9.30	8.55	9.33	PB
5	Addisyn Franceschini	Canada	F64	8.09	x	8.13	8.66	8.40	8.01	8.66	PB
6	Dayawanti	India	F64	7.71	7.49	7.53	7.62	x	7.90	7.90	PB
