= Orla Barry =

Irish Paralympic discus thrower

Personal information
- Nationality: Irish
- Born: 21 September 1989 (age 37) Ladysbridge, County Cork
- Height: 177.8 cm (5 ft 10 in)

Sport
- Sport: Athletics
- Disability class: F57
- Events: Discus, Shot put
- Club: Leevale Athletic Club

Achievements and titles
- Personal best: 31.18 m
Medal record
Women's Discus
Representing Ireland
Summer Paralympics
Bronze medal – third place	2012 London	Discus - F57/58
Silver medal – second place	2016 Rio de Janeiro	Discus (F57)
IPC World Championships
Silver medal – second place	2013 Lyon	Discus - F57/58
Silver medal – second place	2015 Doha	Discus - F57
European Championships
Gold medal – first place	2012 Stadskanaal	Discus - F57/58
Gold medal – first place	2016 Grosseto	Discus - F57
Gold medal – first place	2018 Berlin	Discus - F57
Silver medal – second place	2014 Swansea	Discus - F57

Orla Barry (born 21 September 1989) is an Irish discus thrower. Barry was born in Ladysbridge, County Cork, Ireland and competes in the F57 classification. She has won two Paralympic medals, and is a three time European champion (2012, 2016 and 2018) in the event. On 13 January 2020, Barry announced her retirement from Paralympic sports.
