= Katie Pegg =

Canadian para athlete

Personal information
- Born: June 19, 2004 (age 22) Markham, Ontario, Canada
- Education: Saint Mary's University

Sport
- Sport: Para athletics
- Disability class: F46
- Event: Shot put
- Coached by: Jodi Langley
Medal record
Women's para athletics
Representing Canada
World Championships
Bronze medal – third place	2025 New Delhi	Shot put F46

Katie Pegg (born June 19, 2004) is a Canadian football player and para-athlete who competes in the women's F46 shot put.

== Early life and education ==
Pegg was born without a radial bone in her right forearm. She was first introduced to shotput in grade three and began playing football in sixth grade.

== Career ==
Pegg was the only girl competing in her league in Scarborough when she played for the Scarborough Thunder high school team. She played defensive tackle. Pegg played one year of football with the Halifax Explosion women's football team.

In her second year of university, Pegg joined the Saint Mary's University Huskies track and field team. She competed against able-bodied athletes in shot put in the Atlantic University Sport (AUS) conference, finishing fourth at the AUS championship in Moncton, New Brunswick. She competed as a para-athlete for the first time at the Fazza International Championships in Dubai, part of the World Para Athletics Grand Prix 2024. She won gold in the women's F46 shot put, with a then personal-best throw of 11.15 metres. At the 2024 World Para Athletics Championships, Pegg placed fifth in the women's F46 shot put.

After her results at the 2024 Bell Track & Field Trials, Pegg qualified to compete at the 2024 Summer Paralympics. She placed seventh in women's F46 shot put. She won bronze at the 2025 World Para Athletics Championships in the women’s F46 shot put, throwing a new personal best 12.76 metres.
