= 2016 IPC Athletics European Championships – Women's discus throw =

The women's discus throw at the 2016 IPC Athletics European Championships was held at the Stadio Olimpico Carlo Zecchini in Grosseto from

== Medalists ==
Event	Gold		Silver		Bronze	
F11/12	Sofia Oksem (F12); Russia	47.40 WR; 1048 pts	Busra Nur Tirikli (F11); Turkey	26.61; 805 pts	—	
F38	Noelle Lenihan; Ireland	32.14 WR	Eva Berna (F37); Czech Republic	30.79 CR	Irina Vertinskaya (F37); Russia	29.59 PB
F40/41	Renata Śliwińska (F40); Poland	16.86 PB	Niamh McCarthy (F41); Ireland	27.05 ER	Holly Neill (F41); Great Britain	22.44
F55	Marianne Buggenhagen; Germany	24.57	Marie Hawkeswood; Germany	20.90 PB	Diana Dadzite; Latvia	20.77 PB
F57	Orla Barry; Ireland	31.18 PB	Ivanka Koleva; Bulgaria	21.66	Martina Willing (F56); Germany	20.94 SB
WR world record | AR area record | CR championship record | GR games record | NR national record | OR Olympic record | PB personal best | SB season best | WL world leading (in a given season)

== See also ==
- List of IPC world records in athletics
