= Sabrina Fortune =

British Paralympic athlete

Sabrina Fortune MBE
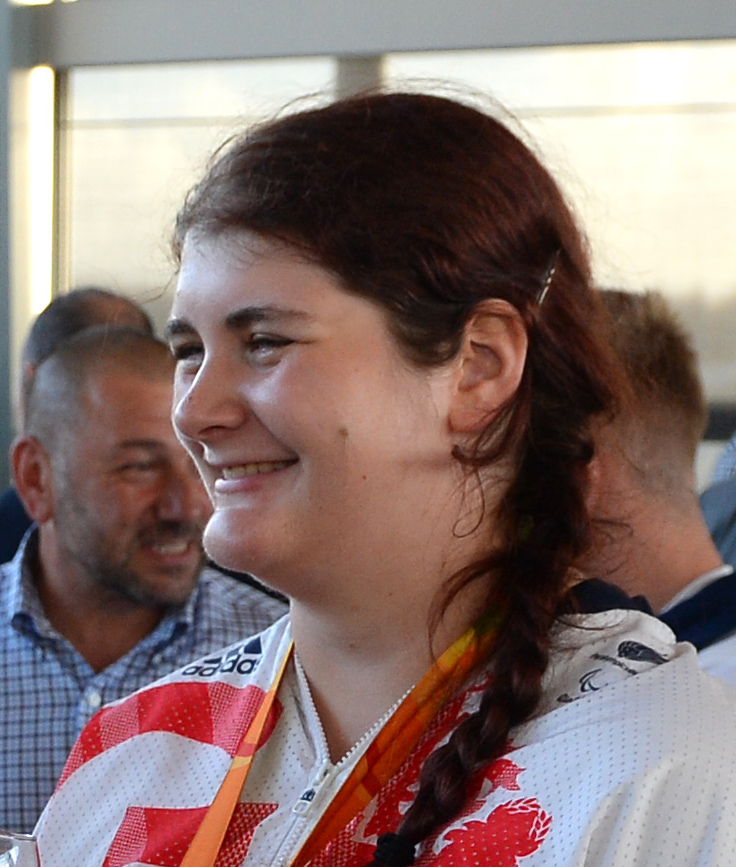
- Fortune in 2016

Personal information
- Nationality: British
- Born: 25 May 1997 (age 29) Chester
- Home town: Wrexham, Wales

Sport
- Country: Wales, Great Britain
- Sport: Para athletics
- Disability: Intellectual impairment
- Disability class: F20
- Event(s): Shot put Discus
- Club: Deeside Amateur Athletic Club
- Coached by: Ian Robinson

Achievements and titles
- Paralympic finals: 2012
Medal record
Women's para athletics
Representing Great Britain
Paralympic Games
Gold medal – first place	2024 Paris	Shot put F20
Bronze medal – third place	2016 Rio	Shot put F20
World Championships
Gold medal – first place	2019 Dubai	Shot put F20
Gold medal – first place	2023 Paris	Shot put F20
Gold medal – first place	2024 Kobe	Shot put F20
Gold medal – first place	2022 New Delhi	Shot put F20
European Championships
Gold medal – first place	2018 Berlin	Shot put F20

Sabrina Fortune (born 25 May 1997) is a British Paralympic track and field athlete from Wales competing in category F20 throwing events. Fortune won a bronze medal at the 2016 Summer Paralympics in the shot put, a gold medal at the 2019 World Para Athletics Championships, also in shot put, and a gold medal at the 2024 Summer Paralympics in shot put.

== History ==
Fortune, who comes from Bryn-y-baal, Mold in north Wales, has speech dyspraxia which makes communication difficult for her. Her condition resulted in a mild intellectual impairment. She attended Argoed High School, after which she studied hospitality management at Coleg Cambria in Wrexham.

== Athletics career ==
Fortune became inspired to take up athletics after watching her brother compete. She joined a club at the age of eleven in 2008 and began competing at local meets. In 2014, she travelled to São Paulo to take part in the Brazilian Paralympic School Games, winning gold in the F20 shot put. That year she also took part in her first IPC Grand Prix, in Grosseto, Italy. The following year Fortune was selected for the Great Britain team to compete at the 2015 IPC Athletics World Championships in Doha, entering the shot put event. Her throw of 12.14m saw her finish just outside the medal positions in fourth place.

In 2016, in the buildup the Rio Paralympics, Fortune travelled back to Grosseto, this time to compete in the 2016 IPC Athletics European Championships. A distance of 12.14m saw her again finish fourth in the shot put. Fortune's results saw her selected for Team GB at the 2016 Summer Paralympics, competing in the shot put. She competed in the final on 10 September throwing a personal best of 12.94 m to win the bronze medal, becoming the first Welsh athlete of the games to reach the podium.

Fortune won the gold medal in shot put F20 at 2018 World Para Athletics European Championships in Berlin, with a championship-record throw of 13.30 m. Fortune won the gold medal in shot put F20 at 2019 World Para Athletics Championships in Dubai, with a championship-record throw of 13.91m.

In June 2021 she was among the first dozen athletes chosen for the UK athletics teams at the postponed 2020 Paralympics in Tokyo. She came fifth in the 2020 Paralympic F20 Shot Put, with a distance of 13.56m.

At the 2023 World Para Athletics Championships Sabrina won gold in the F20 shot put.

In the lead up to the 2024 Summer ParalympicsSabrina broke her own world record in the F20 shot put, with a throw of 14.83m.

At the 2024 Summer Paralympics, Sabrina won the gold medal in the F20 shot put, with another world record of 15.12m.
