= 2015 IPC Athletics World Championships – Women's discus throw =

The women's discus throw at the 2015 IPC Athletics World Championships was held at the Suheim Bin Hamad Stadium in Doha from 22–31 October.

== Medalists ==
Event	Gold		Silver		Bronze	
F11	Zhang Liangmin; China	36.03	Tang Hongxia; China	34.01	Izabela Campos; Brazil	29.95
F12	Sofia Oksem; Russia	45.36 CR	Zhao Yuping; China	41.18 PB	Orysia Ilchyna; Ukraine	38.87 PB
F38	Mi Na (F37); China	33.59 CR	Noelle Lenihan (F38); Ireland	31.64 WR	Renee Danielle Foessel (F38); Canada	30.39
F41	Raoua Tlili; Tunisia	29.70 WR	Fathia Amaimia; Tunisia	24.83	Niamh McCarthy; Ireland	23.66
F44	Yao Juan; China	43.39 WR	Yang Yue; China	41.61	Natalie Bieule; United States	29.61 AR
F52	Rachael Morrison (F51); United States	12.86 WR	Leticia Ochoa Delgado (F52); Mexico	10.66	Joanna Butterfield (F51); Great Britain	8.96 AR
F55	Marianne Buggenhagen; Germany	25.40 SB	Dong Feixia; China	22.74	Marie Hawkeswood; Germany	20.1
F57	Nassima Saifi; Algeria	34.31	Stela Eneva; Bulgaria	32.25	Orla Barry; Ireland	29.82 SB
WR world record | AR area record | CR championship record | GR games record | NR national record | OR Olympic record | PB personal best | SB season best | WL world leading (in a given season)

== See also ==
- List of IPC world records in athletics
