= Noelle Lenihan =

Irish Paralympic discus thrower

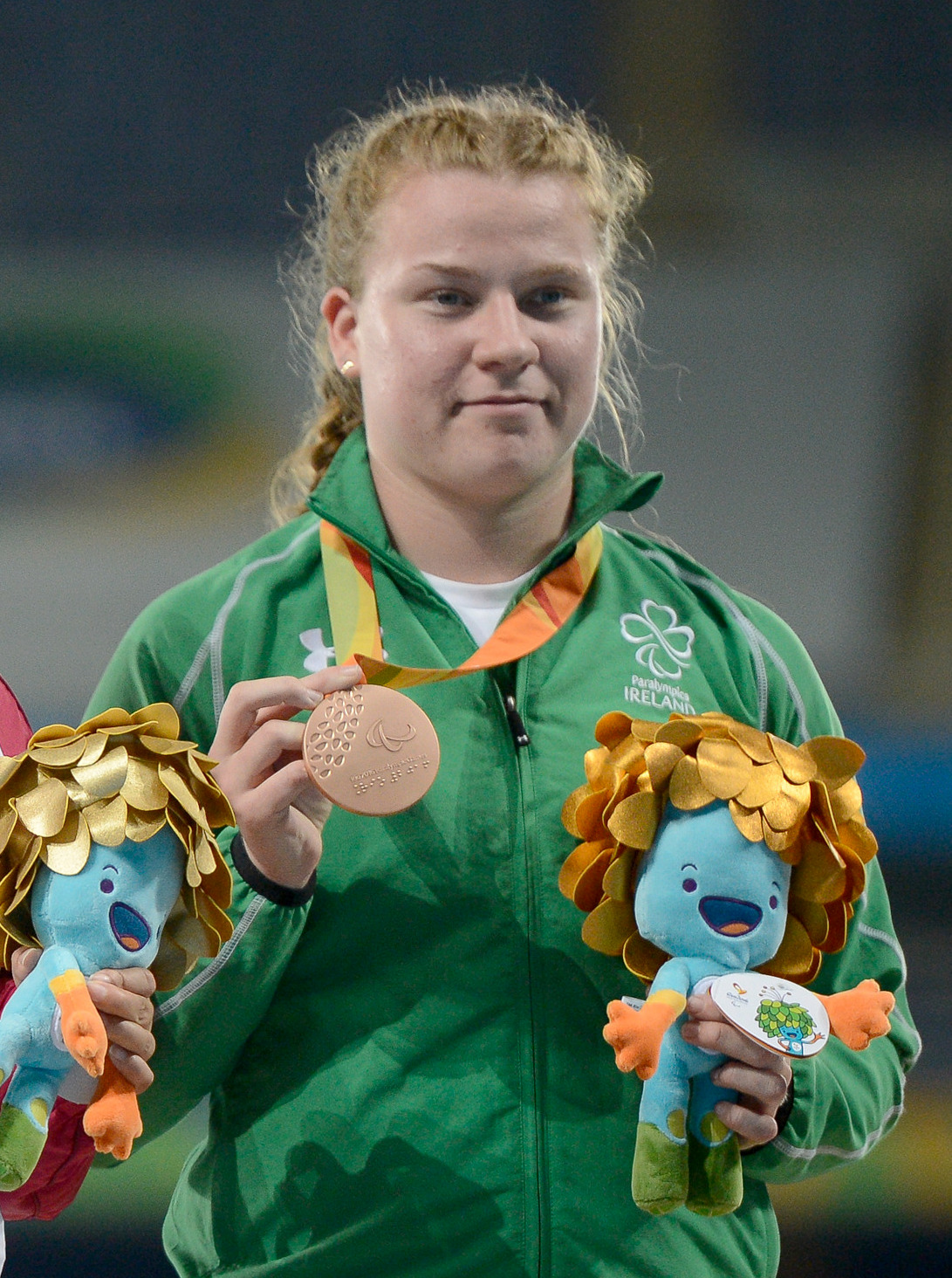
- Lenihan at the 2016 Paralympics

Personal information
- Nationality: Irish
- Born: 4 November 1999 (age 26) County Cork

Sport
- Sport: Athletics
- Disability class: F38
- Event: Discus
- Club: North Cork Athletic Club
- Coached by: Dave Sweeney, Jim Lenihan

Achievements and titles
- Personal best: 32.95 m WR
Medal record
Representing Ireland
Summer Paralympics
Bronze medal – third place	2016 Rio de Janeiro	Discus F37/38
IPC World Championships
Silver medal – second place	2015 Doha	Discus F37/38
Silver medal – second place	2017 London	Discus throw - F38
WPA European Championships
Gold medal – first place	2016 Grosseto	Discus F38
Gold medal – first place	2018 Berlin	Discus F38

Noelle Lenihan (born 4 November 1999) is an Irish paralympic discus thrower competing in the F38 category for athletes with cerebral palsy. Lenihan is a double European champion in the event and, as of August 2018, holds the world record in the classification at 32.95 metres.

== Career ==
Lenihan won silver at the 2015 IPC Athletics World Championships, gold at the 2016 and 2018 World Para Athletics European Championships (both with a world record throw) and bronze at the 2016 Summer Paralympics.

== Personal life ==
Lenihan lives in Deliga, near Milford, County Cork. She has cerebral palsy and so competes in F38 classification events. Her left side is weaker than her right, so she throws using the "South African" half-turn style. Noelle went to school in Hazlewood College Dromcollogher County Limerick from 2012 to 2017.
