= Alexandra Nouchet =

French para athlete (born 1998)

Personal information
- Nationality: French
- Born: 10 April 1998 (age 28)

Sport
- Country: France
- Sport: Para-athletics
- Disability: Agenesis
- Disability class: F64
- Event: shot put
Medal record
Women's para-athletics
Representing France
World Championships
Silver medal – second place	2025 New Delhi	Shot put F64

Alexandra Nouchet (born 10 April 1998) is a French para-athlete specializing in shot put. She represented France at the 2024 Summer Paralympics.

== Career ==
Nouchet represented France at the 2024 Summer Paralympics and finished in tenth place in the shot put F64 event. She competed at the 2025 World Para Athletics Championships and won a silver medal in the shot put F64 event.

== Personal life ==
Nouchet was born with agenesis of the right leg.
