= Kate Hwang =

American para athlete (born 1980)

Personal information
- Nationality: American
- Born: December 26, 1980 (age 45)
- Home town: Courtland, Minnesota, U.S.

Sport
- Sport: Para-athletics
- Disability class: F36
- Event: shot put
Medal record
Women's para-athletics
Representing the United States
World Championships
| Bronze medal – third place | 2025 New Delhi | Shot put F36 |

Kate Hwang (born December 26, 1980) is an American F36 para athlete.

== Early life ==
Hwang began her career with the Kansas City Police Department in the summer of 2002. On June 12, 2003, during a standard traffic stop, she was ambushed by attackers who did not want their vehicle ticketed. As a result she suffered a traumatic brain injury which forced her to retire.

== Career ==
On August 3, 2025, Hwang was selected to represent the United States at the 2025 World Para Athletics Championships. She won a bronze medal in the shot put F36 event.
