= Lucyna Kornobys =

Polish Paralympic athlete (born 1978)

Personal information
- Born: 17 February 1978 (age 48) Kamienna Góra

Sport
- Country: Poland
- Sport: Para-athletics
- Disability: Impaired muscle power
- Disability class: F34
- Events: Discus throw; Javelin throw; Shot put
Medal record
Women's para-athletics
Representing Poland
Paralympic Games
Silver medal – second place	2016 Rio de Janeiro	Shot put F34
Silver medal – second place	2020 Tokyo	Shot put F34
Silver medal – second place	2024 Paris	Shot put F34
World Championships
Gold medal – first place	2019 Dubai	Shot put F33
Silver medal – second place	2011 Christchurch	Javelin throw F33/34/52/53
Silver medal – second place	2015 Doha	Javelin throw F34
Silver medal – second place	2017 London	Shot put F34
Silver medal – second place	2023 Paris	Shot put F34
Silver medal – second place	2025 New Delhi	Shot put F34
Bronze medal – third place	2015 Doha	Shot put F34
Bronze medal – third place	2017 London	Javelin throw F34
Bronze medal – third place	2019 Dubai	Javelin throw F34
European Championships
Gold medal – first place	2018 Berlin	Shot put F33
Gold medal – first place	2021 Bydgoszcz	Shot put F34
Bronze medal – third place	2018 Berlin	Javelin throw F34
Bronze medal – third place	2021 Bydgoszcz	Javelin throw F34

Lucyna Kornobys (born 17 February 1978) is a Polish Paralympic athlete competing in discus throw, javelin throw and shot put events. She represented Poland at the 2016 Summer Paralympics held in Rio de Janeiro, Brazil and she won the silver medal in the women's shot put F34 event. She also won the silver medal in this event at the 2020 Summer Paralympics in Tokyo, Japan and the 2024 Summer Paralympics in Paris, France.

== Career ==
At the 2018 World Para Athletics European Championships held in Berlin, Germany, she won the gold medal in the women's shot put F33 event with a new world record of 7.49 m. She also won the bronze medal in the women's javelin throw F34 event with a new world record of 16.22 m.

In July 2019, she set a new world record in the women's discus throw F33 and women's javelin throw F33 events at the World Para Athletics Grand Prix in Bydgoszcz, Poland.

At the 2019 World Para Athletics Championships held in Dubai, United Arab Emirates, she won the gold medal in the women's shot put F33 event. She also won the bronze medal in the women's javelin throw F34 event. She set new world records in both events.

== Achievements ==
Year	Competition	Venue	Position	Event	Notes
2016	Summer Paralympics	Rio de Janeiro, Brazil	2nd	Shot put	8.00 m
2017	World Championships	London, United Kingdom	2nd	Shot put	8.22 m
2017	World Championships	London, United Kingdom	3rd	Javelin throw	15.63 m
2018	European Championships	Berlin, Germany	1st	Shot put	7.49 m
2018	European Championships	Berlin, Germany	3rd	Javelin throw	16.22 m
2019	World Championships	Dubai, United Arab Emirates	1st	Shot put	7.81 m
2019	World Championships	Dubai, United Arab Emirates	3rd	Javelin throw	16.99 m
2021	European Championships	Bydgoszcz, Poland	3rd	Javelin throw	16.12 m
2021	European Championships	Bydgoszcz, Poland	1st	Shot put	8.78 m
2021	Summer Paralympics	Tokyo, Japan	2nd	Shot put	8.60 m
2023	World Championships	Paris, France	2nd	Shot put	8.49 m
