= Niamh McCarthy =

Irish Paralympic discus thrower

Personal information
- Nationality: Irish
- Born: 4 January 1994 (age 32) County Cork, Ireland

Sport
- Sport: Para-athletics
- Disability class: F41
- Event: Discus throw
- Club: Leevale Athletic Club

Achievements and titles
- Personal best(s): 31.76 m 32.67 m (unofficial)
Medal record
Women's para athletics
Representing Ireland
Summer Paralympics
| Silver medal – second place | 2016 Rio de Janeiro | Discus throw F41 |
World Championships
| Silver medal – second place | 2017 London | Discus throw F41 |
| Bronze medal – third place | 2015 Doha | Discus throw F41 |
European Championships
| Gold medal – first place | 2018 Berlin | Discus throw F41 |
| Silver medal – second place | 2016 Grosseto | Discus throw F40/41 |

Niamh McCarthy (born 4 January 1994) is an Irish Paralympic discus thrower, competing in the F41 classification, a classification for persons of reduced stature. She is the 2018 European champion in the event at her classification and, as of August 2018, the European record holder at 31.76 metres.

== Career ==
McCarthy started competing in discus events in 2013, winning world and European medals before taking a silver at the 2016 Summer Paralympics.

McCarthy won the gold medal at the European Para Athletics Championships in Berlin, August 2018, setting a new European record of 31.76 m

In October 2021, McCarthy retired from competitive throwing after her participation in the deferred 2020 Paralympic Games.

== Personal life ==
McCarthy has lived in England and France. is a former student of Biological and Chemical Sciences at University College Cork. She also practises sky-diving. She has lordosis and competes in F41 classification events, which for women is for those under 140 cm (4 ft 7 in) in height.

After discovering that none of the Irish press or TV channels had sent any journalists to the 2018 Para Athletics European Championships, Niamh decided to cover the Championships herself via her Instagram account.
