= Elham Salehi =

Iranian Paralympic athlete (born 1980)

Personal information
- Nationality: Iranian
- Born: 23 September 1980 (age 46)

Sport
- Country: Iran
- Sport: Para-athletics
- Disability class: F54
- Events: javelin throw shot put
Medal record
Women's para-athletics
Representing Iran
Paralympic Games
Bronze medal – third place	2024 Paris	Javelin throw F54
World Championships
Gold medal – first place	2025 New Delhi	Javelin throw F54
Silver medal – second place	2023 Paris	Javelin throw F54
Bronze medal – third place	2024 Kobe	Javelin throw F54
Bronze medal – third place	2025 New Delhi	Shot put F54
Asian Para Games
Gold medal – first place	2022 Hangzhou	Shot put F54
Gold medal – first place	2026 Aichi–Nagoya	Javelin throw F52/53/54
Gold medal – first place	2026 Aichi–Nagoya	Shot put F53/54
Bronze medal – third place	2022 Hangzhou	Javelin throw F54

Elham Salehi (born 23 September 1980) is an Iranian para-athlete specializing in throwing events: javelin throw and shot put. She represented Iran at the 2024 Summer Paralympics.

== Career ==
Salehi competed at the 2023 World Para Athletics Championships and won a silver medal in the javelin throw F54 event.

In May 2024, Salehi competed at the 2024 World Para Athletics Championships and won a bronze medal in the javelin throw F54 event. She then represented Iran at the 2024 Summer Paralympics and won a bronze medal in the javelin throw F54 event. She competed at the 2025 World Para Athletics Championships and won a gold medal in the javelin throw F54 event, and a bronze medal in the shot put F54 event.

In October 2026, she competed at the 2026 Asian Para Games and won a gold medal in the javelin throw F52/53/54 class with a throw of 16.44 meters. She also won a gold medal in the shot put F53/F54 event.
