= Arelle Middleton =

American Paralympic athlete

Personal information
- Born: February 9, 2008 (age 18) Rancho Cucamonga, California, U.S.

Sport
- Sport: Para-athletics; Wheelchair basketball
- Disability: Congenital Femoral Deficiency
- Disability class: F64
- Event: shot put
Medal record
Representing the United States
Women's para-athletics
Paralympic Games
| Silver medal – second place | 2024 Paris | Shot put F64 |
World Championships
| Gold medal – first place | 2025 New Delhi | Shot put F44 |
| Silver medal – second place | 2024 Kobe | Shot put F64 |
Women's wheelchair basketball
World Championship
| Gold medal – first place | 2026 Ottawa | Team |

Arelle Middleton (born February 9, 2008) is an American para track and field athlete who competes in shot put and discus throw. She is a World Champion and Paralympic Games silver medalist in shot put. She also plays wheelchair basketball.

== Early life and education ==
Middleton is from Rancho Cucamonga, California. Her mother, Sandra Van Embricqs, was born in Suriname and is a former professional basketball player who has coached girls basketball at Chino High School since 2010.

Middleton was born with congenital femoral deficiency, resulting in a left leg that is six inches shorter than her right leg, and a left hip that is underdeveloped. The difference has varied as she has grown and had several surgeries to incrementally lengthen her leg.

Middleton has been involved in sports since she was five years old, playing water polo, volleyball, wheelchair basketball, wheelchair tennis, and doing shot put and discus.

She attended Chino High School in Chino, California, where she competeed in track and field.

== Career ==
=== Para-athletics ===
During her freshman year at Los Osos High School in 2023, Middleton competed in the para division at the CIF State Track & Field Championships and won the ambulatory shot put title with a state record–breaking throw of 12.02 m (39 ft 5 in). She was subsequently named a 2023 U.S. Paralympics Track and Field High School All-American.

In 2024, Middleton missed the state championships, instead making her international debut for the United States at the 2024 World Para Athletics Championships, where she was the youngest member of the team at age 16. She won a silver medal in shot put F64 with a throw of 11.84 m (38 ft 10 in) and placed sixth in discus F64 with a throw of 28.98 m (95 ft 3/4 in). At the 2024 U.S. Paralympic Trials, she threw 11.79 m (38 ft 8 in) in shot put F64 and qualified to represent the United States at the 2024 Summer Paralympics. During the 2024 Summer Paralympics she won a silver medal in the shot put F64 event with a throw of 12.19 m (39 ft 11 3/4 in) and placed tenth in discus F64 with a throw of 30.38 m (99 ft 8 in). She was not only the youngest on the U.S. team, but also the youngest U.S. medalist.

She competed at the 2025 World Para Athletics Championships and won a gold medal in the shot put F44 with a throw of 12.95 m (42 ft 5 3/4 in).

=== Wheelchair basketball ===
Middleton plays wheelchair basketball for the Rancho Halos in the junior division of the National Wheelchair Basketball Association. During the 2023–24 season she was named to the second team all-tournament and the female all-tournament teams.
