= 2017 Canada Summer Games =

- XXVI Canada Games
- Host city: Winnipeg, Manitoba
- Teams: 13
- Opening: July 28
- Closing: August 13
- Opened by: Janice Filmon
- Main venue: Bell MTS Place

Summer

Winter

The 2017 Canada Summer Games, officially known as the XXVI Canada Games, were held in Winnipeg, Manitoba from July 28 to August 13, 2017.

== Venues ==
- Axworthy Health and Recplex - Winnipeg (basketball, wrestling)
- Bell MTS Place - Winnipeg (Opening ceremonies)
- Birds Hill Provincial Park - St. Clements (triathlon, cycling, open water swimming)
- Bison Butte Mountain Bike Course - Winnipeg (cycling - mountain bike)
- Canada Games Sport For Life Centre - Winnipeg (basketball, volleyball)
- Duckworth Centre - Winnipeg (basketball)
- Elmwood Giants Field - Winnipeg (baseball)
- Gimli Yacht Club - Gimli (sailing)
- Investors Group Athletic Centre - Winnipeg (volleyball)
- Investors Group Field - Winnipeg (Closing ceremony)
- John Blumberg Softball Complex - Headingley (softball)
- Kenora Rowing Club - Kenora, Ontario (rowing)
- Manitoba Canoe and Kayak Centre - Winnipeg (canoe/kayak)
- Pan Am Pool - Winnipeg (swimming, diving)
- Ralph Cantafio Soccer Complex - Winnipeg (soccer)
- Red River Exhibition Park - Winnipeg (cycling)
- Sargent Park Beach Volleyball Centre - Winnipeg (beach volleyball)
- Shaw Park - Winnipeg (baseball)
- Southwood Golf & Country Club - Winnipeg (golf)
- The Forks - Winnipeg (festivities)
- University of Manitoba Stadium - Winnipeg (athletics)
- Whittier Park - Winnipeg (baseball)
- Winnipeg Lawn Tennis Club - Winnipeg (tennis)

== Sports ==
- Athletics (54)
- Baseball
- Basketball
- Beach volleyball
- Canoe/Kayak
- Cycling
- Diving
- Golf
- Mountain biking
- Open water swimming
- Rowing
- Sailing
- Soccer
- Softball
- Swimming
- Tennis
- Triathlon
- Volleyball
- Wrestling

=== Calendar ===
OC	Opening ceremony	●	Event competitions	1	Event finals	CC	Closing ceremony

July / August	28th Fri	29th Sat	30th Sun	31st Mon	1st Tues	2nd Wed	3rd Thurs	4th Fri	5th Sat	6th Sun	7th Mon	8th Tues	9th Wed	10th Thurs	11th Fri	12th Sat	13th Sun	Total
Ceremonies	OC																CC	
Athletics				4	6		21	23										54
Baseball		●	●	●	●	●	●	1										1
Basketball		●	●	●	●	●	●	2										2
Canoe/Kayak											8	8	10	10				36
Cycling			2		2		2					2	1	1		2		12
Diving				2	2	2	2											8
Golf												●	●	●	4			4
Rowing				●	●		7	7										14
Sailing			●	●	●		●	5										5
Soccer		●	●	●	●	●	1				●	●	●	●	●	1		2
Softball		●	●	●	●	●	●	1			●	●	●	●	●	●	1	2
Swimming											4	16	16	14	15	2		70
Tennis											●	●	●	●	5			5
Triathlon				2			2	1										5
Volleyball			●	●	●	●	●	2			●	●	●	●	●	2		4
Wrestling													●	2	22			24
Total gold medals			2	8	10	2	35	42			12	26	27	27	46	7	1	245
July / August	28th Fri	29th Sat	30th Sun	31st Mon	1st Tues	2nd Wed	3rd Thurs	4th Fri	5th Sat	6th Sun	7th Mon	8th Tues	9th Wed	10th Thurs	11th Fri	12th Sat	13th Sun	Total

=== Participating teams ===
The number of athletes by province and territory are as follows:

- Alberta (344)
- British Columbia (354)
- Manitoba (330)
- New Brunswick (302)
- Newfoundland and Labrador (273)
- Northwest Territories (95)
- Nova Scotia (318)
- Nunavut (8)
- Ontario (353)
- Prince Edward Island (236)
- Quebec (334)
- Saskatchewan (325)
- Yukon (116)

== Medal table ==
The following is the final medal table for the 2017 Canada Summer Games.

* Host nation ( Manitoba)

Rank	Province	Gold	Silver	Bronze	Total
1	Ontario	87	65	60	212
2	British Columbia	55	49	42	146
3	Quebec	45	41	52	138
4	Alberta	26	38	33	97
5	Nova Scotia	13	21	15	49
6	Manitoba*	10	15	17	42
7	Saskatchewan	8	10	17	35
8	New Brunswick	4	9	11	24
9	Newfoundland and Labrador	0	1	0	1
9	Prince Edward Island	0	1	0	1
11	Northwest Territories	0	0	0	0
11	Nunavut	0	0	0	0
11	Yukon	0	0	0	0
Totals (13 entries)		248	250	247	745

== Medal summary ==
Event	Gold	Silver	Bronze
Athletics - 100m Female	Quebec; DeOndra Green	Ontario; Shyvonne Roxborough	Manitoba; Tegan Turner
Athletics - 100m Male	Ontario; Karson Kowalchuk	British Columbia; Jerome Blake	Ontario; Samuel Adams
Athletics - 100m Special Olympics Female	Ontario; Kristy Alford	Manitoba; Regan Hofley	Nova Scotia; Joy MacLachlan
Athletics - 100m Special Olympics Male	Ontario; Gaerrisen Freeland	British Columbia; Malcolm Jovahny Borsoi	Nova Scotia; Donald Peters
Athletics - 200m Female	Quebec; DeOndra Green	British Columbia; Jasneet Nijjar	Quebec; Audrey Jackson
Athletics - 200m Male	British Columbia; Jerome Blake	Ontario; Karson Kowalchuk	Ontario; Khamal Stewart-Baynes
Athletics - 200m Special Olympics Female	Ontario; Kristy Alford	Manitoba; Regan Hofley	Ontario; Desiree Allen
Athletics - 200m Special Olympics Male	British Columbia; Malcolm Jovahny Borsoi	Ontario; Gaerrisen Freeland	Nova Scotia; Donald Peters
Athletics - 400m Female	Manitoba; Victoria Tachinski	Quebec; Audrey Jackson	Ontario; Katrina Innanen
Athletics - 400m Male	Alberta; Austin Cole	Ontario; Ramzi Abdulahi	Quebec; Alexander Szuba
Athletics - 800m Female	Saskatchewan; Julie Labach	Manitoba; Victoria Tachinski	Ontario; Kate Ayers
Athletics - 800m Male	Alberta; Marco Arop	Saskatchewan; Alexander Eiswerth	Manitoba; Shane Dillon
Athletics - 1500m Female	Quebec; Aurélie Dubé-Lavoie	Saskatchewan; Julie Labach	Saskatchewan; Courtney Hufsmith
Athletics - 1500m Male	Saskatchewan; Alexander Eiswerth	British Columbia; Lukas Jarron	Ontario; Sergio Ráez Villanueva
Athletics - 5000m Female	Ontario; Natalia Hawthorn	New Brunswick; Laura Dickinson	Quebec; Meggie Dargis
Athletics - 5000m Male	British Columbia; Jesse Hooton	Alberta; Russell Pennock	Ontario; Sergio Ráez Villanueva
Athletics - 100m Hurdles Female	Ontario; Brittany Stenekes	Saskatchewan; Katelyn Lehner	Alberta; Hailey Hitchings
Athletics - 110m Hurdles Male	British Columbia; Jackson Cheung	Ontario; Ashton Colaire	Saskatchewan; Payne Wylie
Athletics - 400m Hurdles Female	British Columbia; Megan Champoux	Alberta; Charlotte Terek	Ontario; Dallyssa Huggins
Athletics - 400m Hurdles Male	British Columbia; Jake Hanna	Ontario; Nate St. Romain	Saskatchewan; Payne Wylie
Athletics - 3000m Steeplechase Female	British Columbia; Grace Fetherstonhaugh	New Brunswick; Laura Dickinson	Saskatchewan; Courtney Hufsmith
Athletics - 3000m Steeplechase Male	Quebec; Jean-Simon Desgagnés	Ontario; Josh Kellier	British Columbia; Nickolas Peter Colyn
Athletics - 200m Wheelchair Para Female	New Brunswick; Veronica Coombes	British Columbia; Yeshi Renaerts	Ontario; Jessica Tinney
Athletics - 200m Wheelchair Para Male	Ontario; Isaiah Christophe	Nova Scotia; Ben Brown	Quebec; Lee Leclerc
Athletics - 400m Wheelchair Para Female	New Brunswick; Veronica Coombes	British Columbia; Yeshi Renaerts	Ontario; Jessica Tinney
Athletics - 400m Wheelchair Para Male	Ontario; Isaiah Christophe	Nova Scotia; Ben Brown	Quebec; Lee Leclerc
Athletics - 1500m Wheelchair Para Female	New Brunswick; Veronica Coombes	British Columbia; Yeshi Renaerts	Ontario; Jessica Tinney
Athletics - 1500m Wheelchair Para Male	Ontario; Isaiah Christophe	Nova Scotia; Ben Brown	New Brunswick; Jacob LeBlanc
Athletics - 4x100m Female	British Columbia	Alberta	Manitoba
Athletics - 4x100m Male	Ontario	Quebec	Saskatchewan
Athletics - 4x400m Female	British Columbia	Manitoba	Ontario
Athletics - 4x400 Male	British Columbia	Alberta	Saskatchewan
Athletics - High Jump Female	Quebec; Mikella Lefebvre-Oatis	Ontario; Autumn Bigger	Ontario; Emily Brandenhorst
Athletics - High Jump Male	Quebec; Emile Ollivier	Manitoba; Nathan Smith	Quebec; Philippe St-Hilaire
Athletics - Long Jump Female	Alberta; Sandy Latrace	Quebec; Tatiana Aholou	Ontario; Jamilah James
Athletics - Long Jump Male	Quebec; Stevens Dorcelus	Quebec; Jesse Thibodeau	Alberta; Austin Ost
Athletics - Triple Jump Female	Ontario; Jamilah James	Manitoba; Rebekah Eckert	Ontario; Laura Amoi
Athletics - Triple Jump Male	Quebec; Patrick Hanna	Alberta; Aaron Hernandez	Ontario; Tacuma Anderson-Richards
Athletics - Pole Vault Female	Ontario; Makiah Hunt	Ontario; Rachael Wolfs	Alberta; Meghan Lim
Athletics - Pole Vault Male	British Columbia; David Thomas Boyd	Ontario; Ross Benn	Ontario; Daniel Gleason
Athletics - Shot Put Female	Nova Scotia; Sarah Mitton	British Columbia; Olivia Moriconi	Ontario; Trinity Tutti
Athletics - Shot Put Male	Ontario; Joseph Maxwell	Ontario; Eli Pawliw	New Brunswick; Liam Turgeon
Athletics - Shot Put Para Female	Ontario; Julia Hanes	Alberta; Sarah Mickey	Nova Scotia; Casey Perrin
Athletics - Shot Put Para Male	Alberta; Brian Hnatiw	British Columbia; Eddy Abel Thomm Solla	British Columbia; Dakoda Darling
Athletics - Discus Female	Ontario; Trinity Tutti	Alberta; Gabrielle Rains	Ontario; Grace Tennant
Athletics - Discus Male	Ontario; Mackenzie Josie	Ontario; Joseph Maxwell	Quebec; Samir Aber
Athletics - Discus Para Female	Ontario; Julia Hanes	Alberta; Sarah Mickey	New Brunswick; Christel Robichaud
Athletics - Discus Para Male	British Columbia; Dakoda Darling	Nova Scotia; Ryan Shay	British Columbia; Eddy Abel Thomm Solla
Athletics - Javelin Female	Ontario; Ashley Pryke	Ontario; Bailey Dell	Manitoba; Brooke-Lynn Boyd
Athletics - Javelin Male	Ontario; Ben Cross	Quebec; Gabriel Bisson-Desrosiers	Ontario; Joshua Caleb Mather
Athletics - Hammer Female	British Columbia; Kaila Butler	British Columbia; Chanell Alexa Botsis	Ontario; Lauren Bohn
Athletics - Hammer Male	British Columbia; Sam Willett	British Columbia; Peter Behncke	Alberta; Andreas Troschke
Athletics - Decathlon Male	Quebec; Jonah Elbaz	Saskatchewan; Kieran Johnston	Quebec; Philippe Baril
Athletics - Heptathlon Female	Ontario; Dallyssa Huggins	Quebec; Maude Léveillé	Alberta; Kira Kopec
Baseball - Male	Saskatchewan	Manitoba	Alberta
Basketball - Female	Quebec	Ontario	Manitoba
Basketball - Male	Ontario	Alberta	Quebec
Canoe/Kayak - C-1 200m Female	Quebec; Anne-Sophie Lavoie-Parent	Nova Scotia; Nicole Jessop	Ontario; Rowan Hardy-Kavanagh
Canoe/Kayak - C-1 200m Male	Alberta; Brady Garcia	Nova Scotia; Connor Fitzpatrick	Quebec; Philippe Laliberé
Canoe/Kayak - C-1 500m Female	Quebec; Anne-Sophie Lavoie-Parent	Ontario; Jillian Perrone	Nova Scotia; Nicole Jessop
Canoe/Kayak - C-1 500m Male	Nova Scotia; Connor Fitzpatrick	Quebec; Clément Bouchard	Alberta; Brady Garcia
Canoe/Kayak - C-1 1000m Female	Quebec; Sophia Jensen	Nova Scotia; Marlee Dawn MacIntosh	Manitoba; Maddy Mitchell
Canoe/Kayak - C-1 1000m Male	Nova Scotia; Connor Fitzpatrick	Ontario; Sam Pennyfather	Quebec; Foster Isaiah Salpeter
Canoe/Kayak - C-1 5000m Female	Nova Scotia; Marlee Dawn MacIntosh	Manitoba; Maddy Mitchell	Quebec; Sophia Jensen
Canoe/Kayak - C-1 5000m Male	Nova Scotia; Bret Himmelman	Ontario; Sam Pennyfather	Manitoba; Sam Stevens
Canoe/Kayak - C-2 200m Female	Ontario; Rowan Hardy-Kavanagh; Jillian Perrone	Quebec; Juliette Brault; Anne-Sophie Lavoie-Parent	Manitoba; Nicole Boyer; Maddy Mitchell
Canoe/Kayak - C-2 200m Male	Alberta; Brady Garcia; Gavin Jaeger-Freeborn	Quebec; Clément Bouchard; Louis-David Morency	Nova Scotia; James Gregory MacPhee; Mark Wiseman
Canoe/Kayak - C-2 500m Female	Ontario; Rowan Hardy-Kavanagh; Jillian Perrone	Quebec; Juliette Brault; Anne-Sophie Lavoie-Parent	Nova Scotia; Ava Carew; Nicole Jessop
Canoe/Kayak - C-2 500m Male	Alberta; Brady Garcia; Gavin Jaeger-Freeborn	Quebec; Nikolas Favreau-Regimballe; Foster Isaiah Salpeter	Nova Scotia; Bret Himmelman; Mark Wiseman
Canoe/Kayak - C-2 1000m Female	Quebec; Juliette Brault; Sophia Jensen	Manitoba; Nicole Boyle; Maddy Mitchell	Ontario; Emily Howard; Lindsay Irwin
Canoe/Kayak - C-2 1000m Male	Quebec; Clément Bouchard; Nikolas Favreau-Regimballe	Alberta; Robin Kendall; Mateh Kowaluk	Nova Scotia; Connor Fitzpatrick; Matthew Peachey
Canoe/Kayak - IC-4 200m Female	Manitoba	Quebec	Nova Scotia
Canoe/Kayak - IC-4 200m Male	Quebec	Alberta	Ontario
Canoe/Kayak - IC-4 500m Female	Quebec	Nova Scotia	Ontario
Canoe/Kayak - IC-4 1000m Male	Nova Scotia	Quebec	Ontario
Canoe/Kayak - K-1 200m Female	Nova Scotia; Grace Whebby	Ontario; August Sibthorpe	Quebec; Keisha Tomasik
Canoe/Kayak - K-1 200m Male	Ontario; Nick Matveev	Manitoba; James Lavallée	Quebec; Albert Lavigne
Canoe/Kayak - K-1 500m Female	Nova Scotia; Ashley Card	Ontario; Hayley Plante	Quebec; Keisha Tomasik
Canoe/Kayak - K-1 500m Male	Ontario; Nick Matveev	Nova Scotia; Zane Clarke	Manitoba; James Lavallée
Canoe/Kayak - K-1 1000m Female	Ontario; August Sibthorpe	Nova Scotia; Ashley Card	Alberta; Jane Girgulis
Canoe/Kayak - K-1 1000m Male	Nova Scotia; Zane Clarke	Quebec; Vincent Jourdenais	British Columbia; Alex Brent
Canoe/Kayak - K-1 5000m Female	British Columbia; Cassidy MacPherson	Alberta; Jane Girgulis	Manitoba; Emma Mitchell
Canoe/Kayak - K-1 5000m Male	Ontario; Mitchell Barran	Nova Scotia; Mark Marschalko	British Columbia; Alex Brent
Canoe/Kayak - K-2 200m Female	Nova Scotia; Jessica Hogg; Grace Whebby	Ontario; Lucy Pennyfather; August Sibthorpe	Quebec; Caroline Lesage; Keisha Tomasik
Canoe/Kayak - K-2 200m Male	Quebec; Vincent Jourdenais; Albert Lavigne	Nova Scotia; Paul LaPierre; Mark Marschalko	Ontario; Nick Matveev; Joe Spratt
Canoe/Kayak - K-2 500m Female	Ontario; Hayley Plante; August Sibthorpe	Quebec; Corrina Destiny Higgins; Caroline Lesage	Nova Scotia; Ashley Card; Anna Negulic
Canoe/Kayak - K-2 500m Male	Quebec; Olivier Courchesne; Victor Desaulniers	Nova Scotia; Robert Francis Theodore Laureijs; Jacob Steele	Ontario; Mathieu Schmied; Joe Spratt
Canoe/Kayak - K-2 1000m Female	Ontario; Genevieve L'Abbe; Lexy Vincent	Nova Scotia; Ashley Card; Anna Negulic	Alberta; Jane Girgulis; Stephanie Kendall
Canoe/Kayak - K-2 1000m Male	Nova Scotia; Mark Marschalko; Jacob Steele	Quebec; Vincent Jourdenais; Nicolas Thirion	Ontario; Mitchell Barran; Mathieu Schmied
Canoe/Kayak - K-4 200m Female	Nova Scotia	Ontario	Quebec
Canoe/Kayak - K-4 200m Male	Quebec	Nova Scotia	Manitoba
Canoe/Kayak - K-4 500m Female	Ontario	Nova Scotia	Quebec
Canoe/Kayak - K-4 1000m Male	Quebec	Nova Scotia	Ontario
Road Cycling - Individual time trial Female	British Columbia; Gillian Ellsay	Quebec; Simone Boilard	Quebec; Catherine Ouellette
Road Cycling - Individual time trial Male	Quebec; Adam Roberge	Quebec; Pier-André Côté	British Columbia; Jay Lamoureux
Road Cycling - Criterium Female	British Columbia; Gillian Ellsay	Quebec; Simone Boilard	Ontario; Katherine Maine
Road Cycling - Criterium Male	Quebec; Pier-André Côté	Quebec; Marc-Antoine Soucy	Quebec; Raphaël Auclair
Road Cycling - Road Race Female	Quebec; Simone Boilard	Ontario; Katherine Maine	Alberta; Anna Talman
Road Cycling - Road Race Male	Quebec; Pier-André Côté	Alberta; Connor Toppings	British Columbia; Jay Lamoureux
Mountain Bike - Cross-Country Female	Quebec; Anne-Julie Tremblay	Ontario; Jenn Jackson	Ontario; Soren Meeuwisse
Mountain Bike - Cross-Country Male	Quebec; Felix Burke	Ontario; Brody Sanderson	Quebec; Félix Belhumeur
Mountain Bike - Sprint Female	Quebec; Anne-Julie Tremblay	Nova Scotia; Mackenzie Grace Anne Myatt	Ontario; Jenn Jackson
Mountain Bike - Sprint Male	British Columbia; Rhys Harley Verner	Alberta; Isaac Niles	Quebec; Felix Burke
Mountain Bike - Relay Female	Quebec; Marine Lewis; Sophianne Samson; Anne-Julie Tremblay	Ontario; Dana Gilligan; Jenn Jackson; Soren Meeuwisse	British Columbia; Julia Long; Lucy Schick; Emily Unterberger
Mountain Bike - Relay Male	British Columbia; Sean Fincham; Holden Jones; Rhys Harley Verner	Quebec; Félix Belhumeur; Felix Burke; Félix Longpré	Ontario; Gunnar Holmgren; Liam Mulcahy; Brody Sanderson
Diving - Springboard 1m Female	Ontario; Elaena Nancy Dick	British Columbia; Coral Strugnell	Alberta; Ashley McCool
Diving Springboard 1m Male	Ontario; Henry McKay	British Columbia; Bryden Hattie	Quebec; Peter Thach Mai
Diving - Springboard 3m Female	Ontario; Elaena Nancy Dick	Alberta; Ashley McCool	British Columbia; Coral Strugnell
Diving Springboard 3m Male	Quebec; Peter Thach Mai	British Columbia; Bryden Hattie	British Columbia; Ryan Grover
Diving - Synchro 3m Female	Alberta; Margo Erlam; Ashley McCool	Ontario; Elaena Nancy Dick; Aimee Wilson; Quebec; Sarah Jodoin Di Maria; Mia Vallee	
Diving Synchro 3m Male	Quebec; Gabriel Corriveau; Peter Thach Mai	British Columbia; Ryan Grover; Bryden Hattie	Ontario; Josh Inglis; Victor Povzner
Diving Platform 10m Female	Ontario; Elaena Nancy Dick	Quebec; Sarah Jodoin Di Maria	Saskatchewan; Alyssa Clairmont
Diving Platform 10m Male	Quebec; Thomas William Ciprick	Quebec; Laurent Gosselin-Paradis	Saskatchewan; Rylan Mackenzie Wiens
Golf - Individual Female	Quebec; Céleste Dao	British Columbia; Alisha Lau	Ontario; Eleanor Szeryk
Golf - Individual Male	Quebec; Christopher Charles Vandette	Quebec; Louis-Alexandrew Jobin-Colgan	British Columbia; Tristan Mandur
Golf - Team Female	Quebec; Céleste Dao; Sarah-Ève Florence Monique Rhéaume; Brigitte Thibault	British Columbia; Tiffany Kong; Alisha Lau; Hannah Lee	Ontario; Sarah Beqaj; Monet Chun; Eleanor Szeryk
Golf - Team Male	Quebec; Louis-Alexandre Jobin-Colgan; Antoine Roy; Christopher Charles Vandette	British Columbia; Keaton Gudz; Tristan Mandur; Nolan Thoroughgood	New Brunswick; Stuart Michael Earle; Samuel Reid; Calvin Ross
Rowing - Single Scull Female	Manitoba; Emma Gray	Quebec; Marilou Duvernay-Tardif	British Columbia; Ivy Elling Quaintance
Rowing - Single Scull Male	Ontario; Trevor Jones	British Columbia; Ty Adams	Saskatchewan; Thomas Isaac Markewich
Rowing - Double Sculls Female	Quebec; Anna Claire Margaretha Burnotte; Marilou Duvernay-Tardif	British Columbia; Julia Lindsay; McKenna Jae Simpson	Manitoba; Emma Gray; Gabriella Yakemow
Rowing - Double Sculls Male	Ontario; Trevor Jones; Gavin Stone	British Columbia; Ty Adams; Elliot Rogers	Quebec; Quentin Basiren; Sam Carmel
Rowing - Lightweight Double Sculls	British Columbia; Riley Knight; Julia Lindsay	Saskatchewan; Sarah Craven; Kate Morstad	Alberta; Lucy Lu; Emily Arich
Rowing - Quadruple Sculls Female	Ontario	British Columbia	Manitoba
Rowing - Quadruple Sculls Male	Ontario	British Columbia	Alberta
Rowing - Pair Female	British Columbia; Lise McCracken; Avalon Clare Wasteneys	Alberta; Aline Belzil; Veronique Ulrich	Ontario; Claire Dirks; Lauren Gadsdon
Rowing - Pair Male	Ontario; Hunter Amesbury; Luke Gadsdon	British Columbia; Isaac Donaldson; Travis Gronsdahl	Alberta; Curtis Ames; Alexander Sawers
Rowing - Four Female	British Columbia	Alberta	Saskatchewan
Rowing - Four Male	British Columbia	Ontario	Alberta
Rowing - Lightweight Four Male	Ontario	British Columbia	Alberta
Rowing - Eight with Coxswain Female	British Columbia	Alberta	Ontario
Rowing - Eight with Coxswain Male	Ontario	British Columbia	Alberta
Sailing - Single-handed - Laser Male	Ontario; Matti Muru	British Columbia; John Owen	Quebec; Justin Vittecoq
Sailing - Single-handed - Laser Radial Female	Ontario; Clara Gravely	Nova Scotia; Lauren Sullivan	Quebec; Léa Desgroseilliers
Sailing - 2.4m Para Mix	Saskatchewan; Joe Gerlinsky	Ontario; Aaron Wong-Sing	Nova Scotia; Siobhan MacDonald
Sailing - 29er Female	Quebec; Caterina Kunz; Audrey Staples	Ontario; Chloe Congourdeau; Georgia Stein	British Columbia; Emily Bugeja; Hannah Kathleen Smith
Sailing - 29er Male	Nova Scotia; Cameron Ewan Bayne Shaw; Justin Garret Timmins	Ontario; Jake Adair; Galen Richardson	Quebec; Alec Baird; Cameron Baird
Soccer - Female	Quebec	Ontario	Nova Scotia
Soccer - Male	Ontario	Alberta	Quebec
Softball - Female	British Columbia	Alberta	Ontario
Softball - Male	Ontario	Saskatchewan	Quebec
Swimming - 50m Freestyle Female	Manitoba; Oksana Chaput	New Brunswick; Brooklyn Elizabeth Douthwright	Ontario; Genevieve Sasseville
Swimming - 50m Freestyle Male	British Columbia; Tyler Wall	Ontario; Joshua Liendo	Quebec; Brandon Lacroix
Swimming - 50m Freestyle Para Female	Saskatchewan; Shelby Lynn Newkirk	Ontario; Angela Marina	British Columbia; Arianna Hunsicker
Swimming - 50m Freestyle Para Male	Ontario; Tyson MacDonald	Quebec; Benjamin Désilets	Quebec; Nicolas Plamondon
Swimming - 50m Freestyle Special Olympics Female	Quebec; Myriam Vézina	British Columbia; Mikyla Elaine Carlow	British Columbia; Genny Verge
Swimming - 50m Freestyle Special Olympic Male	British Columbia; Jesse Shade	Alberta; Wesley Wilks	British Columbia; Cameron Chambers
Swimming - 100m Freestyle Female	Manitoba; Oksana Chaput	Ontario; Hanna Henderson	New Brunswick; Brooklyn Elizabeth Douthwright; Jessica Luo
Swimming - 100m Freestyle Male	British Columbia; Tyler Wall	Alberta; Cole Pratt	Ontario; Ethan Placek
Swimming - 100m Freestyle Para Female	Ontario; Angela Marina	Saskatchewan; Shelby Lynn Newkirk	British Columbia; Arianna Hunsicker
Swimming - 100m Freestyle Para Male	Ontario; Tyson MacDonald	Quebec; Benjamin Désilets	Quebec; Nicolas Plamondon
Swimming - 100m Freestyle Special Olympics Female	Manitoba; Quinlan Roberts	British Columbia; Genny Verge	British Columbia; Mikyla Elaine Carlow
Swimming - 100m Freestyle Special Olympics Male	British Columbia; Jesse Shade	Alberta; Wesley Wilks	Ontario; Gaël Shindano
Swimming - 200m Freestyle Female	Ontario; Hanna Henderson	Ontario; Tori Meklensek	Alberta; Emma O'Croinin
Swimming - 200m Freestyle Male	Alberta; Cole Pratt	Ontario; Owen Huang	British Columbia; Raben Commann
Swimming - 400m Freestyle Female	Alberta; Emma O'Croinin	Ontario; Tori Meklensek	British Columbia; Zoe Froh
Swimming - 400m Freestyle Male	British Columbia; Raben Dommann	Quebec; Patrick Hussey	Ontario; David Quirie
Swimming - 800m Freestyle Female	Alberta; Emma O'Croinin	British Columbia; Sophie Grace Lorette	British Columbia; Zoe Froh
Swimming - 800m Freestyle Male	British Columbia; Raben Dommann	Saskatchewan; Michael McGillivray	Quebec; Louis Bertrand
Swimming - 1500m Freestyle Female	Alberta; Emma O'Croinin	Ontario; Kenna Smallegange	Saskatchewan; Rebecca Lou Dean
Swimming - 1500m Freestyle Male	British Columbia; Raben Dommann	Quebec; Patrick Hussey	Alberta; Drew Edwards
Swimming - 200m (S1-5, S14)/400m (S6-13) Freestyle Para Female	Ontario; Angela Marina	Quebec; Miori Hénault	British Columbia; Arianna Hunsicker
Swimming - 200m (S1-5, S14)/400m (S6-13) Freestyle Para Male	Ontario; Tyson MacDonald	Quebec; Benjamin Désilets; Quebec; Nicolas Plamondon	
Swimming - 4x50m Freestyle Relay Female	Ontario	British Columbia	Quebec
Swimming - 4x50m Freestyle Relay Male	Ontario	Quebec	British Columbia
Swimming - 4x100m Freestyle Relay Female	Ontario	British Columbia	Quebec
Swimming - 4x100m Freestyle Relay Male	Ontario	British Columbia	Alberta
Swimming - 4x200m Freestyle Relay Female	British Columbia	Ontario	Quebec
Swimming - 4x200m Freestyle Relay Male	British Columbia	Ontario	Quebec
Swimming - 50m Backstroke Female	Ontario; Hanna Henderson	New Brunswick; Brooklyn Elizabeth Douthwright	Alberta; Alex Butler
Swimming - 50m Backstroke Male	Ontario; Graysen Bernard	Quebec; Alex Labrie	Quebec; Samuel George Bourassa
Swimming - 50m Backstroke Special Olympics Female	Ontario; Desiree Pennells	Manitoba; Quinlan Roberts	Manitoba; Sam Currie
Swimming - 50m Backstroke Special Olympics Male	British Columbia; Jesse Shade	British Columbia; Cameron Chambers	Alberta; Wesley Wilks
Swimming - 100m Backstroke Female	Ontario; Hanna Henderson	British Columbia; Haley Klenk	Alberta; Alex Butler
Swimming - 100m Backstroke Male	Alberta; Cole Pratt	Ontario; Graysen Bernard	British Columbia; Tyler Wall
Swimming - 100m Backstroke Special Olympics Female	British Columbia; Genny Verge	Ontario; Desiree Pennells	Manitoba; Sam Currie
Swimming - 100m Backstroke Special Olympics Male	British Columbia; Jesse Shade	British Columbia; Cameron Chambers	Nova Scotia; Andy Lowe
Swimming - 200m Backstroke Female	British Columbia; Acacia Kathryn Benn	British Columbia; Hana Edwards	Quebec; Jacqueline Rosemary Doray Buche
Swimming - 200m Backstroke Male	Ontario; Graysen Bernard	British Columbia; Tyler Wall	Alberta; Cole Pratt
Swimming - 50m (S1-5) / 100m (S6-14) Backstroke Para Female	Saskatchewan; Shelby Lynn Newkirk	Ontario; Angela Marina	Ontario; Gabby Baird
Swimming - 50m (S1-5) / 100m (S6-14) Backstroke Para Male	Ontario; Tyson MacDonald	Ontario; Matt Cabraja	New Brunswick; Jesse Myles Canney
Swimming - 50m Breaststroke Female	Alberta; Avery Wiseman	Prince Edward Island; Alexa McQuaid	Alberta; Pilar McCann
Swimming - 50m Breaststroke Male	Ontario; Gabe Mastromatteo	Ontario; Owen Huang	British Columbia; Michael Schmidt
Swimming - 100m Breaststroke Female	Alberta; Avery Wiseman	Ontario; Emma Myburgh	Alberta; Pilar McCann
Swimming - 100m Breaststroke Male	Ontario; Owen Huang	Alberta; Finlay Knox	British Columbia; Michael Schmidt
Swimming - 200m Breaststroke Female	Alberta; Avery Wiseman	British Columbia; Bailey Paula Herbert	Saskatchewan; Emma Spence
Swimming - 200m Breaststroke Male	Alberta; Finlay Knox	Ontario; Gabe Mastromatteo	Ontario; Owen Huang
Swimming - 50m (S1-3) / 100m (S4-14) Breaststroke Para Female	Saskatchewan; Shelby Lynn Newkirk	British Columbia; Arianna Hunsicker	Ontario; Angela Marina
Swimming - 50m (S1-3) / 100m (S4-14) Breaststroke Para Male	Ontario; Tyson MacDonald	Alberta; Hidde Geurts	Quebec; Benjamin Désilets
Swimming - 50m Butterfly Female	Ontario; Genevieve Sasseville	Manitoba; Oksana Chaput	Ontario; Hanna Henderson
Swimming - 50m Butterfly Male	Ontario; Joshua Liendo	Quebec; Brandon Lacroix	Alberta; Sterlyng Blair
Swimming - 100m Butterfly Female	Ontario; Genevieve Sasseville	Quebec; Jeanne Dahmen	Manitoba; Oksana Chaput
Swimming - 100m Butterfly Male	Alberta; Cole Pratt	Ontario; Joshua Liendo	Ontario; Graysen Bernard
Swimming - 200m Butterfly Female	Quebec; Lora Willar	Ontario; Hanna Henderson	British Columbia; Sophie Grace Lorette
Swimming - 200m Butterfly Male	Alberta; Cole Pratt	Ontario; Joshua Liendo	Ontario; Ray Yang
Swimming - 50m (S1-7) / 100m (S8-14) Butterfly Para Female	Ontario; Angela Marina	Saskatchewan; Shelby Lynn Newkirk	British Columbia; Aimee Brennan
Swimming - 50m (S1-7) / 100m (S8-14) Butterfly Para Male	Quebec; Nicolas Plamondon	New Brunswick; Jesse Myles Canney	Ontario; Tyson MacDonald
Swimming - 200m Medley Female	British Columbia; Bailey Paul Herbert	British Columbia; Acacia Kathryn Benn	Alberta; Avery Wiseman
Swimming - 200m Medley Male	Alberta; Cole Pratt	Ontario; Graysen Bernard	Alberta; Finlay Knox
Swimming - 400m Medley Female	British Columbia; Bailey Paula Herbert	Alberta; Emma O'Cronin	Ontario; Regan Rathwell
Swimming - 400m Medley Male	Ontario; Graysen Bernard	Alberta; Finlay Knox	New Brunswick; Jacob Gallant
Swimming - 150m (S1-4) / 200m (S5-14) Medley Para Female	Saskatchewan; Shelby Lynn Newkirk	Ontario; Angela Marina	British Columbia; Arianna Hunsicker
Swimming - 150m (S1-4) / 200m (S5-14) Medley Para Male	Ontario; Tyson MacDonald	New Brunswick; Jesse Myles Canney	Quebec; Nicolas Plamondon
Swimming - 4x50m Medley Relay Female	Alberta	Ontario	Quebec
Swimming - 4x50m Medley Relay Male	Ontario	British Columbia	Alberta
Swimming - 4x100m Medley Relay Female	Ontario	Alberta	British Columbia
Swimming - 4x100m Medley Relay Male	Ontario	Alberta	British Columbia
Swimming - 5000m Open Water Female	Alberta; Emma O'Croinin	British Columbia; Acacia Kathryn Benn	New Brunswick; Brooklyn Elizabeth Douthwright
Triathlon- Individual Female	British Columbia; Desirae Ridenour	British Columbia; Hannah Henry	Manitoba; Kyla Roy
Tennis - Singles Female	Ontario; Rhea Verma	Alberta; Ashleigh Jacobs	Ontario; Vanessa Wong
Tennis - Singles Male	Ontario; Malik Bhatnagar	Quebec; Nicaise Muamba	Ontario; Victor Krustev
Tennis - Doubles Female	Ontario; Ariana Arseneault; Jada Bui	Quebec; Érica Di Battista; Mireille Moreau	British Columbia; Yasmin Mansouri; Sasha Vagramov
Tennis - Doubles Male	Quebec; Kamen Damov; Alex-Antoine Marquis	Ontario; Daniel Ethan Fainblum; Josh Lapadat	British Columbia; Aaron Diemer; Jovan Sihota
Tennis - Team Mix	Ontario	British Columbia	Quebec
Triathlon - Individual Female	British Columbia; Desirae Ridenour	British Columbia; Hannah Henry	Manitoba; Kyla Roy
Triathlon - Individual Male	Quebec; Paul-Alexandre Pavlos Antoniades	British Columbia; Michael Milic	Ontario; Liam Donnelly
Triathlon - 3X Relay Female	British Columbia; Hannah Henry; Desirae Ridenour; Holly Henry	Manitoba; Kyla Roy; Claire Healey; Caitlyn Roy	Ontario; Ella Kubas; Haley Sturrock; Cassandra Dalbec
Triathlon - 3X Relay Male	British Columbia; Michael Milic; Brock Oliver Hoel; Aiden Longcroft-Harris	Ontario; Tristen Jones; Justin De Jong; Liam Donnelly	Quebec; Paul-Alexandre Pavlos Antoniades; Jérémie Martin; Félix Plourde-Couture
Triathlon - Mixed Relay Mix	British Columbia	Ontario	Quebec
Indoor Volleyball - Female	Manitoba	Alberta	Ontario
Indoor Volleyball - Male	Ontario	Alberta	British Columbia
Beach Volleyball - Female	Alberta; Kate Pexman; Olivia Furlan	Ontario; Molly McBain; Lea Monkhouse	British Columbia; Quinci Birker; Darby Taylor Dunn
Beach Volleyball - Male	British Columbia; Jeff Webb; Isaac Bevis	Nova Scotia; Christian Fricke; Kobe Mckeil Shannon	Ontario; Logan Mend; Tomas Sorra
Wrestling Team - Female	British Columbia	Alberta	Ontario
Wrestling Team - Female	Ontario	British Columbia	Quebec
Wrestling Individual - 38 kg-40 kg Female	British Columbia; Emilee Lai	Ontario; Halle Bachiu	Alberta; Maya Johnston
Wrestling Individual - 40–44 kg Male	Ontario; Gregor McNeil	British Columbia; Ravi Manhas	Quebec; Chistopher Merlo
Wrestling Individual - Up to 44 kg Female	British Columbia; Alexia Seal	Alberta; Kenza Messaoudini	New Brunswick; Annabelle Boudreau
Wrestling Individual - Up to 48 kg Female	Ontario; Jayden Sparks	New Brunswick; Tania Blanchard	Alberta; Xana Beran
Wrestling Individual - Up to 48 kg Male	Ontario; Mateo Anisi	Quebec; Marius Samson	Saskatchewan; Drake Joseph Buechler
Wrestling Individual - Up to 52 kg Female	British Columbia; Jacqueline Law	Ontario; Samantha Romano	Alberta; Tiana Bryant
Wrestling Individual - Up to 52 kg Male	Ontario; Lachlan McNeil	Manitoba; Khaled Aldrar	British Columbia; Kye Mills
Wrestling Individual - Up to 56 kg Female	British Columbia; Victoria Seal	Saskatchewan; Aleah Nickel	Quebec; Erin Rainville
Wrestling Individual - Up to 56 kg Male	Alberta; Jordan Wong	Ontario; Stone Lewis	New Brunswick; Alex Cormier
Wrestling Individual - Up to 60 kg Female	British Columbia; Jade Trolland	Nova Scotia; Makayla Levy	Saskatchewan; Frankie Marie Gawryluik
Wrestling Individual - Up to 60 kg Male	Ontario; Patrik Leder	British Columbia; Karan Gill	Quebec; Nataël Lebrun Cantin
Wrestling Individual - Up to 64 kg Female	British Columbia; Sara Brinkac	New Brunswick; Jasmine Thebeau	Ontario; Nyla Burgess
Wrestling Individual - Up to 65 kg Male	Alberta; Connor McNeice	Ontario; Pierre Arabadjian	British Columbia; Juggy Gakhal
Wrestling Individual - Up to 69 kg Female	British Columbia; Ana Paula Godinez	Ontario; Ellise Daynes	Saskatchewan; Rachel Evans
Wrestling Individual - Up to 70 kg Male	Ontario; Adam Scott	Alberta; Magnus McCrackin	British Columbia; Aaron Badovinac
Wrestling Individual - Up to 74 kg Female	Ontario; Dejah Slater	Alberta; Praise Abidemi-Aremu	Nova Scotia; Hannah Hubley
Wrestling Individual - Up to 76 kg Male	Alberta; Adam Thomson	Manitoba; Carson Lee	British Columbia; Harbans Gill
Wrestling Individual - Up to 79 kg Female	Ontario; Shantay Slater	Alberta; Halima Fanta	Saskatchewan; Lillian Pinay
Wrestling Individual - Up to 84 kg Female	Manitoba; Jessica Rabet	Newfoundland and Labrador; Angel Hiltz-Morrell	Ontario; Sydney Lewis
Wrestling Individual - Up to 85 kg Male	Quebec; Julien Choquette	New Brunswick; Justin Patrick Joseph Shannon	British Columbia; Connor Pattison
Wrestling Individual - Up to 98 kg Male	Manitoba; Hunter Lee	Ontario; Kyle Jordon	Saskatchewan; Austin Shopa
Wrestling Individual 98 kg-120 kg Male	New Brunswick; Chris O'Toole	Ontario; Jeremy Badgley	British Columbia; Tanjot Kahlon
