= 2024 World Para Athletics Championships – Women's shot put =

The women's shot put events at the 2024 World Para Athletics Championships were held in Kobe.

== Medalists ==
Event	Gold	Silver	Bronze
F12	Safiya Burkhanova; Uzbekistan	Zhao Yuping; China	Xue Enhui; China
F20	Sabrina Fortune; Great Britain	Poleth Méndes; Ecuador	Aleksandra Zaitseva; Neutral Paralympic Athletes (NPA)
F32	Wanna Helena Brito Oliveira; Brazil	Evgeniia Galaktionova; Neutral Paralympic Athletes (NPA)	Maroua Brahmi; Tunisia
F33	Gilda Guadalupe Cota Vera; Mexico	Wu Qing; China	Svetlana Krivenok; Neutral Paralympic Athletes (NPA)
F34	Zou Lijuan; China	Bhagyashree Jadhav; India	Saida Amoudi; Morocco
F35	Wang Jun; China	Dilafruzkhon Akhmatkhonova; Uzbekistan	not awarded
F37	Li Yingli; China	Irina Vertinskaya; Neutral Paralympic Athletes (NPA)	Mi Na; China
F40	Maryam Alzeyoudi; United Arab Emirates	Pauleth Mejía Hernández; Mexico	Lara Baars; Netherlands
F41	Raoua Tlili; Tunisia	Kubaro Khakimova; Uzbekistan	Mayerli Buitrago Ariza; Colombia
F46	Noelle Malkamaki; United States	Holly Robinson; New Zealand	Yukiko Saito; Japan
F54	Gloria Zarza Guadarrama; Mexico	Elizabeth Rodrigues Gomes; Brazil	Nurkhon Kurbanova; Uzbekistan
F57	Safia Djelal; Algeria	Xu Mian; China	Nassima Saifi; Algeria
F64	Yao Juan; China	Arelle Middleton; United States	Yang Yue; China
