= 2021 World Para Athletics European Championships – Women's shot put =

The women's shot put events were held on each day of the 2021 World Para Athletics European Championships in Bydgoszcz, Poland.

== Medalists ==
Event	Gold		Silver		Bronze	
F12	Nadezhda Burkova; Russia	13.06 CR	Lydia Church; Great Britain	12.34	Orysia Ilchyna; Ukraine	11.84 SB
F20	Aleksandra Zaitseva; Russia	13.29 PB	Viktoriia Shpachynska; Ukraine	13.22 PB	Zoi Mantoudi; Greece	13.00
F32	Evgeniia Galaktionova; Russia	6.95 ER	Anastasiia Moskalenko; Ukraine	6.81	Róża Kozakowska; Poland	2.82
F33	Joanna Oleksiuk; Poland	6.62	Anthi Liagkou; Greece	5.29 SB	Not awarded	
F34	Lucyna Kornobys; Poland	8.78 ER	Vanessa Wallace; Great Britain	8.73 PB	Marie Brämer-Skowronek; Germany	7.76 PB
F35	Mariia Pomazan; Ukraine	12.81 CR	Anna Luxová; Czech Republic	8.85 PB	Klaudia Maliszewska; Poland	8.67 PB
F36	Miriam Martínez Rico; Spain	9.50	Cheyenne Bouthoorn; Netherlands	9.49 PB	Not awarded	
F37	Eva Datinská; Czech Republic	10.20	Bergrun Osk Adalsteinsdottir; Iceland	8.76 PB	Ingeborg Eide Gardarsdottir; Iceland	8.75 PB
F40	Renata Śliwińska; Poland	8.75 CR	Lara Baars; Netherlands	7.85	Mary Fitzgerald; Ireland	7.35
F41	Ana Gradečak; Croatia	8.23 ER	Rabia Cirit; Turkey	7.61	Rose Vandegou; France	7.25 SB
F54	Iana Lebiedieva; Ukraine	5.62 ER (F53)	Mariia Bogacheva; Russia	7.10 CR (F54)	Yuliya Nezhura; Belarus	6.61 (F54)
F57	Miroslava Obrová; Czech Republic	7.06 SB	Jelena Vuković; Croatia	7.05 SB	Nataša Sobočan; Croatia	6.94 SB
WR world record | ER European record | CR championship record | NR national record | WL world leading | EL European leading | PB personal best | SB seasonal best

== See also ==
- List of IPC world records in athletics
