= Holly Neill =

British Paralympic athlete

Personal information
- Full name: Holly Neil
- Nationality: British
- Born: 6 April 1989 (age 37)

Sport
- Country: Great Britain
- Sport: Athletics
- Event(s): F41 Shot put F41 Discus throw
- Club: Yeovil
- Coached by: Andrew Roda

Achievements and titles
- Personal best(s): Shot Put: 7.1 m Discus: 22.49 m
Medal record
Women's para-athletics
Representing United Kingdom
IPC World Championships
Bronze medal – third place	2013 Lyon	Discus - F41
IPC European Championships
Bronze medal – third place	2016 Grosseto	Discus - F40/41

Holly Neill (born 6 April 1989) is a parasport track and field athlete from England competing in category F41 throwing events. Neill has represented Great Britain in the 2013 IPC Athletics World Championships in the discus throw, finishing third. She competes in the Les Autres Paralympic category as an athlete with dwarfism.

== Career history ==
Neill, who was born with dwarfism, was initially more interested in equestrian sports, but after an injury to her competition horse, and a lack of funds, she began looking for other sporting outlets. Neill had always been interested in athletics, and had entered the 2009 World Dwarf Games in Belfast, where she had won three medals in throwing events, but she now decided to take the sport more seriously.

In 2010 Neill entered several meets, including the Sport Grand Prix in Perivale, the UK National Open Dwarf Games in Birmingham and the London Disability Athletics Challenge, competing in the discus, javelin and shot put. She also entered the IWAS World Junior Championships in Olomouc in the Czech Republic. At the Junior Championship, Neill took bronze in the javelin and discus and gold in the shot put.

In 2011 Neill dropped the javelin throw to concentrate on her other two events. She again entered the IWAS World Junior Championships, this time held in Dubai. There she took silver in the discus and retained her shot put title. 2011 also saw Neill enter the Paralympic World Cup in Manchester where she came fourth in the shot. Although not part of Team GB in the 2012 Summer Paralympics, Neill was selected for the 2013 IPC Athletics World Championships in Lyon, selected in the discus. There she threw 21.54m, below her personal best, to win the bronze medal.
