= Ebrar Keskin =

Turkish para athlete (born 2007)

Personal information
- Nationality: Turkish
- Born: 24 January 2007 (age 19)

Sport
- Sport: Para-athletics
- Disability class: F20
- Event: shot put
Medal record
Women's para-athletics
Representing Turkey
World Championships
Silver medal – second place	2025 New Delhi	Shot put F20

Ebrar Keskin (born 24 January 2007) is a Turkish para athlete specializing in shot put. She represented Turkey at the 2024 Summer Paralympics.

== Career ==
Keskin represented Turkey at the 2024 Summer Paralympics and finished in the fifth place in the shot put F20 event. She competed at the 2025 World Para Athletics Championships and won a silver medal in the shot put F20 event with a personal best throw of 13.80 metres. She became the first Turkish female athlete to win a silver medal in shot put at the World Para Athletics Championships.
