= Rabia Cirit =

Turkish Paralympic athlete

Personal information
- Born: 16 April 1998 (age 28) Malatya, Turkey

Sport
- Country: Turkey
- Sport: Paralympic athletics
- Disability: Short stature
- Disability class: F41
- Event(s): Shot put, discus throw
Medal record
Track and field
Representing Turkey
World Para Athletics European Championships
Silver medal – second place	2021 Bydgoszcz	Shot put F41
Bronze medal – third place	2018 Berlin	Shot put F41

Rabia Cirit (born 16 April 1998) is a Turkish female para-athlete competing in the F41 disability class of shot put and discus throw events.

== Private life ==
Rabia Cirit was born in Malatya, Turkey on 16 April 1998.

== Sport career ==
Cirit began her sport career at Samsun Canik Belediyespor in 2016. In 2017, she was admitted to the Turkey national team.

She captured two gold medals, in the shot put F41 and discus throw F41 events, at the 2018 IPC World Para-Athletics Grand Prix Italian Open in Rieti. She won the silver medal in the shot put F41 event at the third leg of the 2021 World Para-Athletics Grand Prix held in Jesolo, Italy. She broke the European record with 8.14 m (26.7 ft) set on 17 April 2021, which belonged to Ana Gradecak from Croatia. At the 2018 World Para Athletics European Championships in Berlin, Germany, she took the bronze medal in the shot put F41 event . She won the silver medal in the shot put F41 event of the 2021 World Para Athletics European Championships in Bydgoszcz, Poland.
