= Julia Hanes =

Canadian para athletics competitor

Personal information
- Born: May 19, 1995 (age 31)
- Home town: LaSalle, Ontario, Canada

Sport
- Country: Canada
- Sport: Para-athletics; Wheelchair rugby
- Disability class: F33
- Club: BC Wheelchair Sports Assoc. - Athletics
- Coached by: Agnes Esser
Medal record
Women's para-athletics
Representing Canada
World Championships
Bronze medal – third place	2025 New Delhi	Shot put F33

Julia Hanes (born May 19, 1995) is a Canadian para-athletics athlete who competes in throwing events.

== Early life and education ==
Hanes is from LaSalle, Ontario. She acquired hemiplegia when she was 17 in January 2013.

In 2017, she graduated from McMaster University's health sciences program with a specialization biomedical sciences. She entered the University of Ottawa School of Medicine's MD program shortly after. She was one of the first medical students in the university's history to regularly use a wheelchair. After completing her MD in 2022, she began a residency at the University of British Columbia.

== Career ==
After acquiring her disability, Hanes was introduced to para-sport through para ice hockey. She competed at the 2017 Canada Summer Games in shotput and discus. She won gold in both events, throwing 20.62 metres for discus and 7 meters for shotput. In 2018, she won a silver medal in shot put at the World Cerebral Palsy Games. In 2023, Hanes competed at the Wheelchair Rugby Women's Cup in Paris as a member of the Canadian women's wheelchair rugby team. The team won bronze at the competition. She won gold in F33 women's shot put at the 2024 Canadian Track and Field Championships.

Hanes made her Paralympic debut at the 2024 Summer Paralympics. She place sixth in women's F33 shot put and eighth in women's F34 javelin, throwing 15.34 metres. She was one of only two F33 competitors in the F34 event. At the 2025 World Para Athletics Championships, Hanes won a bronze medal in the women's F33 shot put, with a throw of 7.51 metres.

== Personal life ==
Hanes lives in Vancouver, British Columbia.
