= Lara Baars =

Dutch Paralympic athlete (born 1996)

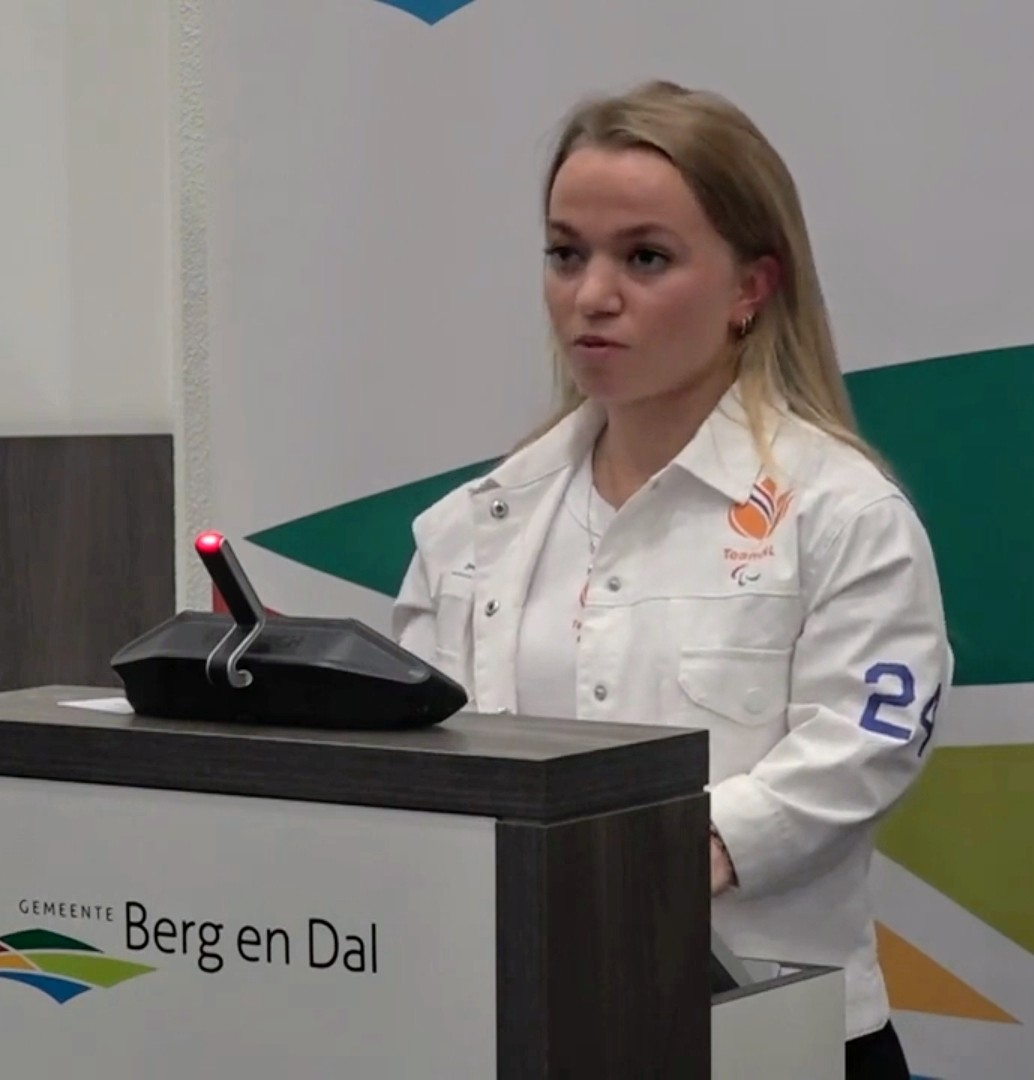

Personal information
- Born: 23 December 1996 (age 29)

Sport
- Country: Netherlands
- Sport: Para-athletics
- Disability: Achondroplasia (short stature)
- Disability class: F40
- Events: Discus throw; Shot put
Medal record
Women's para-athletics
Representing Netherlands
Paralympic Games
Gold medal – first place	2024 Paris	Shot put F40
Bronze medal – third place	2016 Rio de Janeiro	Shot put F40
World Championships
Gold medal – first place	2025 New Delhi	Shot put F40
Silver medal – second place	2015 Doha	Shot put F40
European Championships
Silver medal – second place	2018 Berlin	Shot put F40
Silver medal – second place	2021 Bydgoszcz	Shot put F40
Bronze medal – third place	2018 Berlin	Discus throw F41
Bronze medal – third place	2021 Bydgoszcz	Discus throw F41

Lara Baars (born 23 December 1996) is a Dutch Paralympic athlete competing in shot put and discus throw events. She was born with achondroplasia, a form of dwarfism. She won the gold medal in the women's shot put F40 event at the 2024 Summer Paralympics held in Paris, France.

== Career ==
At the 2015 IPC Athletics World Championships in Doha, Qatar, Baars won the silver medal in the women's shot put F40 event.

Baars represented the Netherlands at the 2016 Summer Paralympics in Rio de Janeiro, Brazil and she won the bronze medal in the women's shot put F40 event.

At the 2018 World Para Athletics European Championships in Berlin, Germany, Baars won the silver medal in the women's shot put F40 event and the bronze medal in the women's discus throw F41 event. The following year, she competed in the women's shot put F40 event at the 2019 World Para Athletics Championships held in Dubai, United Arab Emirates where she finished in 5th place with a new personal best of 7.47 m.

Baars won two medals at the 2021 World Para Athletics European Championships in Bydgoszcz, Poland: she won silver in the shot put F40 event and bronze in the discus throw F41 event.
