= Madina Mukhtorova =

Uzbekistani para-athlete (born 2006)

Personal information
- Nationality: Uzbekistani
- Born: 1 November 2006 (age 19)

Sport
- Sport: Para-athletics
- Disability class: F40
- Event(s): discus throw shot put
Medal record
Women's para-athletics
Representing Uzbekistan
World Championships
Silver medal – second place	2025 New Delhi	Shot put F40
Asian Para Games
Bronze medal – third place	2022 Hangzhou	Discus throw F40/41

Madina Mukhtorova (born 1 November 2006) is an Uzbekistani para-athlete specializing in discus throw and shot put. She represented Uzbekistan at the 2024 Summer Paralympics.

== Career ==
Mukhtorova represented Uzbekistan at the 2024 Summer Paralympics and finished in eighth place in the shot put F41 event. She also finished in eleventh place in the discus throw F41 event with a personal best throw of 19.77 metres. She competed at the 2025 World Para Athletics Championships and won a silver medal in the shot put F40 event.
