= Navruza Akhmatova =

Uzbekistani para athlete (born 2005)

Personal information
- Nationality: Uzbekistani
- Born: 20 March 2005 (age 21)

Sport
- Country: Uzbekistan
- Sport: Para-athletics
- Disability class: F41
- Event(s): discus throw shot put
Medal record
Women's para-athletics
Representing Uzbekistan
World Championships
Bronze medal – third place	2025 New Delhi	Discus throw F41

Navruza Akhmatova (born 20 March 2005) is an Uzbekistani para-athlete specializing in throwing events: discus throw and shot put.

== Career ==
Akhmatova made her World Para Athletics Championships debut at the 2025 World Para Athletics Championships. She won a bronze medal in the discus throw F41 event, with an Asian record throw of 28.83 metres. She also competed in the shot put F41 event, and finished in fourth place with a personal best throw of 9.49 metres.
