= Rose Wélépa =

New Caledonian Paralympic athlete

Rose Welepa
Personal information
- Born: 19 January 1986 (age 40) Maré, New Caledonia

Sport
- Country: France
- Sport: Paralympic athletics
- Disability: Visual impairment
- Disability class: F12
- Event(s): Discus throw Javelin throw Shot put
- Club: Club Athletique Jules Garnier
- Coached by: Olivier Deniaud
Medal record
Paralympic athletics
Representing France
European Championships
Bronze medal – third place	2016 Grosseto	Women's shot put F12
Bronze medal – third place	2018 Berlin	Women's discus throw F12
Bronze medal – third place	2018 Berlin	Women's javelin throw F13
Representing Papua New Guinea
Pacific Games
Silver medal – second place	2011 Nouméa	Women's shot put seated
Representing New Caledonia
Gold medal – first place	2015 Port Moresby	Women's shot put ambulant

Rose Wélépa (born 19 January 1986) is a New Caledonian Paralympic athlete who competes in discus throw, javelin throw and shot put events representing France in international level events.
