= Karomat Omonova =

Uzbekistani Paralympic athlete (born 2005)

Personal information
- Nationality: Uzbekistani
- Born: 28 April 2005 (age 21)

Sport
- Country: Uzbekistan
- Sport: Para athletics
- Disability class: F46
- Event(s): Javelin throw shot put
Medal record
Women's para-athletics
Representing Uzbekistan
World Championships
Gold medal – first place	2025 New Delhi	Shot put F46

Karomat Omonova (born 28 April 2005) is an Uzbekistani para-athlete who specializes in javelin throw and shot put events.

== Career ==
Omonova competed in the Olomouc 2025 Women's Grand Prix, where she won the gold medal in the shot put in her classification.

Omonova competed in the 2025 World Para Athletics Championships held in New Delhi, where she won the gold medal in the shot put F46, setting a new Asian record in the process.
