= Renata Śliwińska =

Polish Paralympic athlete (born 1996)

Personal information
- Born: 5 September 1996 (age 29) Skwierzyna, Poland

Sport
- Country: Poland
- Sport: Para-athletics
- Disability: Short stature
- Disability class: F40
- Events: Discus throw; Shot put
Medal record
Women's para-athletics
Representing Poland
Paralympic Games
Gold medal – first place	2020 Tokyo	Shot put F40
Silver medal – second place	2024 Paris	Shot put F40
World Championships
Gold medal – first place	2023 Paris	Shot put F40
Silver medal – second place	2017 London	Shot put F40
Silver medal – second place	2019 Dubai	Shot put F40
European Championships
Gold medal – first place	2018 Berlin	Shot put F40
Gold medal – first place	2021 Bydgoszcz	Shot put F40
Silver medal – second place	2018 Berlin	Discus throw F41
Silver medal – second place	2021 Bydgoszcz	Discus throw F41

Renata Śliwińska (born 5 September 1996) is a Polish Paralympic athlete competing in F40-classification discus throw and shot put events. She won the gold medal in the women's shot put F40 event at the 2020 Summer Paralympics held in Tokyo, Japan. In this event, she is also a two-time gold medalist at the World Para Athletics European Championships and a three-time medalist, including gold, at the World Para Athletics Championships.

== Career ==
In 2016, Śliwińska represented Poland at the Summer Paralympics and she competed in both the women's discus throw F41 and women's shot put F40 events. In the women's discus throw event she set a new world record of 23.34. She represented Poland at the 2020 Summer Paralympics in the women's shot put F40 event after she finished 2nd in the women's shot put F40 event at the 2019 World Para Athletics Championships held in Dubai, United Arab Emirates.

Śliwińska won the gold medal in the women's shot put F40 event at the 2018 World Para Athletics European Championships in Berlin, Germany. She also won the silver medal in the women's discus throw F41 event.
