= Ivanka Koleva =

Bulgarian Paralympic athlete

Personal information
- Nationality: Bulgaria
- Born: 9 December 1968 (age 57) Chirpan, Bulgaria

Sport
- Sport: Athletics, Powerlifting
- Event(s): Javelin, Shot put, Discus
- Coached by: Stefan Stoykov
Medal record
Paralympic athletics
Representing Bulgaria
Paralympic Games
Gold medal – first place	2000 Sydney	Shot Put - F57
IPC World Championships
Gold medal – first place	1994 Berlin	Discus - F56
Silver medal – second place	1998 Birmingham	Shot put- F56/57
Bronze medal – third place	1994 Berlin	Javelin - F57
European Championships
Gold medal – first place	2016 Grosseto	Shot put - T57
Silver medal – second place	2016 Grosseto	Discus throw - T57

Ivanka Koleva (Bulgarian: Иванка Колева) (born 9 December 1968) is a Paralympian track and field athlete from Bulgaria competing mainly in throwing events in the T57 classification. Koleva has represented Bulgaria at four Summer Paralympics from 2000 to 2012, winning gold in the shot put in the 2000 Summer Paralympics in Sydney. She was also world champion in the discus in 1994, and competed once as a powerlifter in the 2008 Summer Paralympics at Beijing.

== Personal history ==
Koleva was born in Chirpan Bulgaria in 1968. Her mother had a kidney problem during pregnancy and was given a medication which had a harmful effect on the foetus. Due to this Koleva was born with impairments to her legs which resulted in them being amputated when she was six years-old.

== Sporting career ==
Koleva took up para-sport in Stara Zagora in 1985 out of curiosity. In 1994 she represented Bulgaria at the 1994 IPC Athletics World Championships in Berlin, winning gold in the discus throw and bronze in the javelin. She followed this with further success in the 1998 World Championships in Birmingham, when she took silver in the shot put.

She competed in her first Summer Paralympic Games in 2000 in Sydney. There she entered the discus throw (F58) and the shot put (F57), taking the gold medal in the latter with a distance of 7.85. She would go on to represent her country at the following three Summer Paralympics, but despite entering another nine events, all in field athletics, she failed to repeat the success of her first games. Her best result after 2000 were two sixth places in the 2004 and 2008 games in the shot put, but after Sydney her event was merged with other classification athletes on a points basis, greatly widening the field of competition. At the 2008 Games Koleva also entered the powerlifting tournament in the 67.5 kg event, but failed to complete a successful lift.

Koleva has competed at every IPC World Championship from 1994 to 2015, and in 2016 she entered the 2016 European Games in Grosseto. In the F57 shot put she threw a season's best of 8.50 to take her first major international gold medal for 16 years.
