= 2018 World Para Athletics European Championships =

Track and field competition

World Para Athletics European Championships
- Host city: Berlin, Germany
- Nations: 35
- Athletes: 596
- Events: Track and field
- Dates: 20–26 August
- Main venue: Friedrich-Ludwig-Jahn-Sportpark

The 2018 World Para Athletics European Championships was a track and field competition for athletes with a disability open to International Paralympic Committee (IPC) affiliated countries within Europe, plus Azerbaijan and Israel. It was held in Berlin, Germany and took place between 20 and 26 August 2018 at the Friedrich-Ludwig-Jahn-Sportpark. 596 athletes from 35 countries competed during the championships.

Formerly the IPC Athletics European Championships, this was the first edition of the championships since IPC undertook a rebrand of all sports for which they are the governing body, including the 'World Para' title for the committees running each sport. IPC Athletics was rebranded World Para Athletics in 2016; its first World Para Athletics Championships were held in 2017, and the European Championships followed suit in 2018.

Russia were unable to compete due to their ongoing suspension from IPC and World Para Athletics. Poland topped the medal table.

== Venue ==
Berlin, Germany

The venue for the Championships was the Friedrich-Ludwig-Jahn-Sportpark athletics stadium in the Northeast of Berlin.

== Format ==
The 2018 World Para Athletics European Championships was an invitational championships for track and field events. No combined sports were included and not all events were open to all classifications, no events were contested between classifications.

Athletes who came in first place were awarded the gold medal, second place the silver medal and third place the bronze. If only three competitors were declared to compete in an event then no bronze medal was awarded. Some events were classed as 'no medal' events.

== Events ==
=== Classification ===
To ensure competition is as fair and balanced as possible, athletes are classified dependent on how their disability impacts on their chosen event/s. Thus athletes may compete in an event against competitors with a different disability to themselves. Where there are more than one classification in one event, (for example discus throw F54/55/56), a points system is used to determine the winner. RaceRunning, an event using adapted tricycle frames for athletes with a severe balance impairment, was introduced for the first time in the RR category, while 'blade' athletes, using a prosthetic specialist limb were placed in new *61-4 categories, while athletes with lower limb disabilities, but not amputations, remained in the *42-4 categories.

- F = field athletes
- T = track athletes
- 11-13 – visually impaired, 11 and 12 compete with a sighted guide
- 20 – intellectual disability
- 31-38 – cerebral palsy or other conditions that affect muscle co-ordination and control. Athletes in class 31-34 compete in a seated position; athletes in class 35-38 compete standing.
- 40-47 – arm amputation, lower limb deficiencies and les autres
- 51-58 – wheelchair athletes
- 61-63 – leg amputees, 'blade' athletes
- RR1-3 – racerunners who employ an adapted tricycle to maintain balance.

== Summary ==
36 athletes won two gold medals or more at the event, while the seven listed below won 3 golds or more. Pierre Fairbank of France, with 4 gold medals, was the most successful athlete at the event, with Diana Dadzite of Latvia and Sophie Hahn of Great Britain the most successful female athletes with 3 gold medals.

The most successful home athletes were Felix Streng and Johannes Floors, with three gold and one silver medal each.

Alexandra Helbling of Switzerland won 5 medals, a gold, 3 silvers and a bronze, the most medals of any athlete at the event.

Rank	Athlete	Nation	Gold	Silver	Bronze	Total
1	Pierre Fairbank	France (FRA)	4	0	0	4
2	Johannes Floors	Germany (GER)	3	1	0	4
2	Felix Streng	Germany (GER)	3	1	0	4
2	Leo Pekka Tahti	Finland (FIN)	3	1	0	4
5	Sophie Hahn	Great Britain (GBR)	3	0	0	3
5	Diana Dadzite	Latvia (LAT)	3	0	0	3
5	Marcel Hug	Switzerland (SUI)	3	0	0	3

=== Broken records ===
15 World Records were broken in total across all events, with a further 9 European records also falling. Lucyna Kornobys of Poland was the only athlete to break two world records, setting new marks in the women's javelin F33 and shot put F33. Markus Rehm of Germany broke his own world record in the long jump T64 with a distance of 8.48 - a distance that would have won the able bodied event a few weeks earlier.

Event	Round	Name	Nation	Time/Distance	Date
Men's long jump T64	Final	Markus Rehm	Germany	8.48 WR	25 Aug
Men's shot put F34	Final	Tomasz Paulinski	Poland	11.00 WR	24 Aug
Men's shot put F41	Final	Bartosz Tyszkowski	Poland	14.04 WR	20 Aug
Men's discus throw F11	Final	Oney Tapia	Italy	46.07 WR	22 Aug
Men's discus throw F55	Final	Nebojša Đurić	Serbia	39.84 WR	20 Aug
Men's javelin throw F38	Final	Dmitrijs Silovs	Latvia	51.54 ER	20 Aug
Men's javelin throw F40	Final	Take Zonneveld	Netherlands	33.22 ER	26 Aug
Women's 100m T64	Final	Marlene van Gansewinkel	Netherlands	12.85 WR	20 Aug
Women's 400m T20	Final	Carina Paim	Portugal	57.29 ER	22 Aug
Women's 800m T20	Final	Barbara Niewiedzial	Poland	2:15.79 WR	23 Aug
Women's long jump T20	Final	Karolina Kucharczyk	Poland	6.14 WR	24 Aug
Women's long jump T64	Final	Marie-Amelie Le Fur	France	6.01 WR	26 Aug
Women's shot put F33	Final	Lucyna Kornobys	Poland	7.49 WR	20 Aug
Women's shot put F36	Final	Birgit Kober	Germany	11.79 WR	24 Aug
Women's shot put F40	Final	Renata Śliwińska	Poland	8.50 WR	22 Aug
Women's shot put F41	Final	Rose Vandegou	France	7.19 ER	23 Aug
Women's shot put F53	Final	Iana Lebiedieva	Ukraine	5.43 ER	25 Aug
Women's discus throw F38	Final	Noelle Lenihan	(Republic of Ireland) Ireland	32.95 WR	22 Aug
Women's discus throw F41	Final	Niamh McCarthy	(Republic of Ireland) Ireland	31.76 ER	26 Aug
Women's discus throw F51	Final	Zoia Ovsii	Ukraine	13.04 ER	20 Aug
Women's discus throw F53	Final	Iana Lebiedieva	Ukraine	14.93 WR	20 Aug
Women's javelin throw F33	Final	Lucyna Kornobys	Poland	16.22 WR	24 Aug
Women's javelin throw F53	Final	Iana Lebiedieva	Ukraine	11.15 ER	23 Aug
Women's club throw F51	Final	Zoia Ovsii	Ukraine	24.31 WR	24 Aug

== Medal table ==
In a number of events not all medals were awarded, due to field sizes or tied medals. In addition, a small number of rces were deemed 'non-medal' events, and are therefore not included in the final medal table.

Final table, 26 August 2018.

Host nation (Germany)

Rank	Nation	Gold	Silver	Bronze	Total
1	Poland	26	15	20	61
2	Great Britain	20	14	16	50
3	Ukraine	19	22	8	49
4	France	17	13	9	39
5	Germany*	14	19	9	42
6	Spain	8	13	7	28
7	Switzerland	8	5	10	23
8	Finland	8	4	2	14
9	Portugal	7	7	3	17
10	Italy	6	3	8	17
11	Ireland	6	0	3	9
12	Turkey	5	6	8	19
13	Latvia	5	1	1	7
14	Netherlands	4	13	7	24
15	Bulgaria	4	2	5	11
16	Belarus	4	2	2	8
17	Serbia	3	2	8	13
18	Denmark	3	2	2	7
19	Austria	3	2	0	5
20	Greece	2	5	4	11
21	Lithuania	2	3	3	8
21	Sweden	2	3	3	8
23	Croatia	2	2	4	8
24	Belgium	2	2	2	6
25	Norway	1	1	0	2
26	Hungary	1	0	3	4
27	Czech Republic	0	5	5	10
28	Slovakia	0	2	1	3
29	Azerbaijan	0	2	0	2
29	Cyprus	0	2	0	2
29	Luxembourg	0	2	0	2
32	Iceland	0	1	3	4
33	Montenegro	0	1	0	1
34	Israel	0	0	3	3
35	Romania	0	0	1	1
Totals (35 entries)		182	176	160	518

== Participating nations ==
Below is the list of countries who participated in the Championships. Russia were unable to take part due to their ongoing suspension from the IPC.

- Austria
- Azerbaijan
- Belarus
- Belgium
- Bosnia and Herzegovina
- Bulgaria
- Croatia
- Cyprus
- Czech Republic
- Denmark
- Estonia
- Finland
- France
- Germany
- Great Britain
- Greece
- Hungary
- Iceland
- Ireland
- Israel
- Italy
- Latvia
- Lithuania
- Luxembourg
- Moldova
- Montenegro
- Netherlands
- Norway
- Poland
- Portugal
- Romania
- Serbia
- Slovakia
- Slovenia
- Spain
- Sweden
- Switzerland
- Turkey
- Ukraine

== Footnotes ==
Notes

== See also ==
- 2018 World Para Swimming European Championships, held in the National Aquatic Centre, Dublin.
- 2018 European Athletics Championships, also held in Berlin.
