= Athletics at the 2024 Summer Paralympics – Women's javelin throw =

Event at the 2024 Summer Paralympics

The Women's javelin throw athletics events for the 2024 Summer Paralympics took place at the Stade de France from August 31 to September 7, 2024. A total of 5 events were contested in this discipline.

== Schedule ==
R	Round 1	½	Semifinals	F	Final

Date	Sat 31		Sun 1		Mon 2		Tue 3		Wed 4		Thu 5		Fri 6		Sat 7	
Event	M	E	M	E	M	E	M	E	M	E	M	E	M	E	M	E
F13	F															
F34				F												
F46														F		
F54															F	
F56							F									

== Medal summary ==
The following is a summary of the medals awarded across all javelin throw events.

Classification	Gold		Silver		Bronze	
F13	Zhao Yuping; China	47.06 WR	Anna Kulinich-Sorokina; Neutral Paralympic Athletes	38.10	Natalija Eder; Austria	37.22
F34	Lijuan Zou; China	22.55 WR	Caiyun Zuo; China	19.44	Dayna Crees; Australia	17.65
F46	Naibys Morillo; Venezuela	43.77 PR	Shahinakhon Yigitalieva; Uzbekistan	43.12	Hollie Arnold; Great Britain	40.59
F54	Nurkhon Kurbanova; Uzbekistan	21.12 WR	Flora Ugwunwa; Nigeria	19.26	Elham Salehi; Iran	16.24
F56	Diāna Krumina; Latvia	24.99 PR	Raíssa Rocha Machado; Brazil	23.51	Lin Sitong; China	22.35

== Results ==
=== F13 ===
Women's Javelin Throw F13 at the XVII Paralympic Games
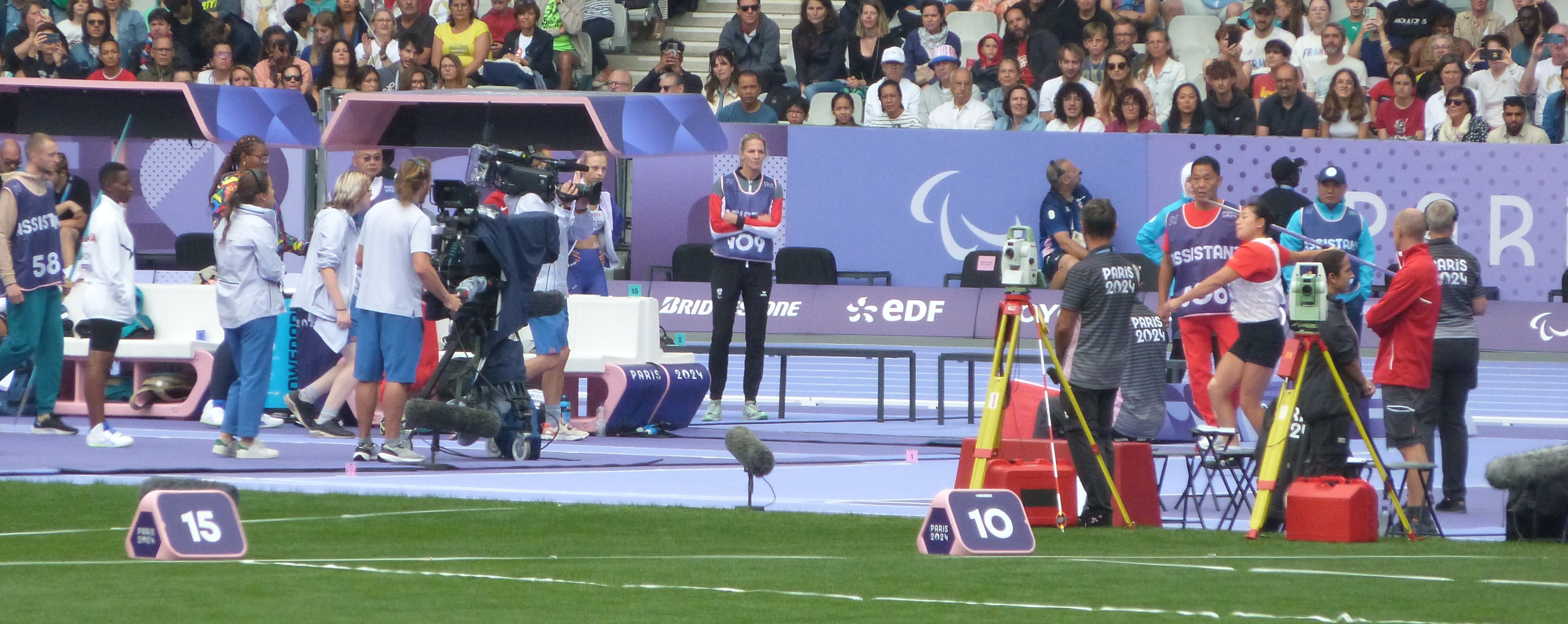
- Zhao Yuping competing for China in the Women's Javelin F13
- Venue: Stade de France, Paris
- Date: 3 September 2024
- Competitors: 11 from 10 nations

Medalists
1st place, gold medalist(s)		Zhao Yuping	China
2nd place, silver medalist(s)		Anna Kulinich-Sorokina	Neutral Paralympic Athletes
3rd place, bronze medalist(s)		Natalija Eder	Austria

The Women's javelin throw F13 event at the 2024 Summer Paralympics in Paris, took place on 3 September 2024.

Records

Prior to this competition, the existing world, Paralympic, and area records were as follows:

Results

The final in this classification took place on 31 August 2024, at 11:06

Rank	Athlete	Nationality	1	2	3	4	5	6	Best	Notes
1st place, gold medalist(s)	Yuping Zhao	China	44.72	47.06	43.72	x	45.34	44.71	47.06	WR
2nd place, silver medalist(s)	Anna Kulinich-Sorokina	Neutral Paralympic Athletes	34.32	34.50	33.30	x	36.56	38.10	38.10	SB
3rd place, bronze medalist(s)	Natalija Eder	Austria	35.40	33.51	34.46	33.56	36.35	37.22	37.22	
4	Lizaveta Dabravolskaya	Neutral Paralympic Athletes	32.31	34.66	35.75	x	x	36.71	36.71	
5	Gulbakhyt Kaiyrzhanova	Kazakhstan	x	32.94	29.53	31.64	32.23	34.23	34.23	PB
6	Ya-Ting Liu	Chinese Taipei	30.13	31.27	30.84	30.88	32.76	27.93	32.76	SB
7	Ashlyn Renneberg	Canada	27.14	30.86	30.93	30.56	x	28.96	30.93	
8	Bakhta Benallou	Algeria	29.59	x	28.81	x	29.63	x	29.63	
9	Sheilla Wanyoyi	Kenya	x	28.44	18.81				28.44	
10	Escobar Yasiris Blandon	Colombia	26.55	x	x				26.55	SB
	Serap Demirkapu	Turkey							DNS	

=== F34 ===
Women's Javelin Throw F34 at the XVII Paralympic Games
- Venue: Stade de France, Paris
- Date: 1 September 2024
- Competitors: 10 from 7 nations

Medalists
1st place, gold medalist(s)		Lijuan Zou	China
2nd place, silver medalist(s)		Zuo Caiyun	China
3rd place, bronze medalist(s)		Dayna Crees	Australia

Records

Prior to this competition, the existing world, Paralympic, and area records were as follows:

Results

The final in this classification took place on 1 September 2024, at 19:49.

Rank	Athlete	Nationality	1	2	3	4	5	6	Best	
1st place, gold medalist(s)	Lijuan Zou	China	22.49	21.98	22.09	22.55	22.36	21.21	22.55	WR
2nd place, silver medalist(s)	Caiyun Zuo	China	18.19	19.42	18.73	18.49	17.69	19.44	19.44	PB
3rd place, bronze medalist(s)	Dayna Crees	Australia	17.65	x	17.55	16.38	17.13	x	17.65	
4	Yousra Ben Jemaa	Tunisia	15.25	16.03	15.85	16.62	17.14	17.20	17.20	
5	Frances Herrmann	Germany	16.92	16.98	16.87	17.18	17.16	17.10	17.18	
6	Marjaana Heikkinen	Finland	x	16.28	16.30	16.44	15.75	16.58	16.58	
7	Fouzia El Kassioui	Morocco	13.86	15.43	14.64	15.98	x	15.39	15.98	
8	Julia Hanes	Canada	14.38	15.34	14.53	15.28	x	13.20	15.34	
9	Sawsen Ben Mbarek	Tunisia	14.27	14.97	13.49	14.74	x	x	14.97	
10	Saida Amoudi	Morocco	14.59	13.83	13.56	14.73	14.50	x	14.73	

=== F46 ===
Women's Javelin Throw F46 at the XVII Paralympic Games
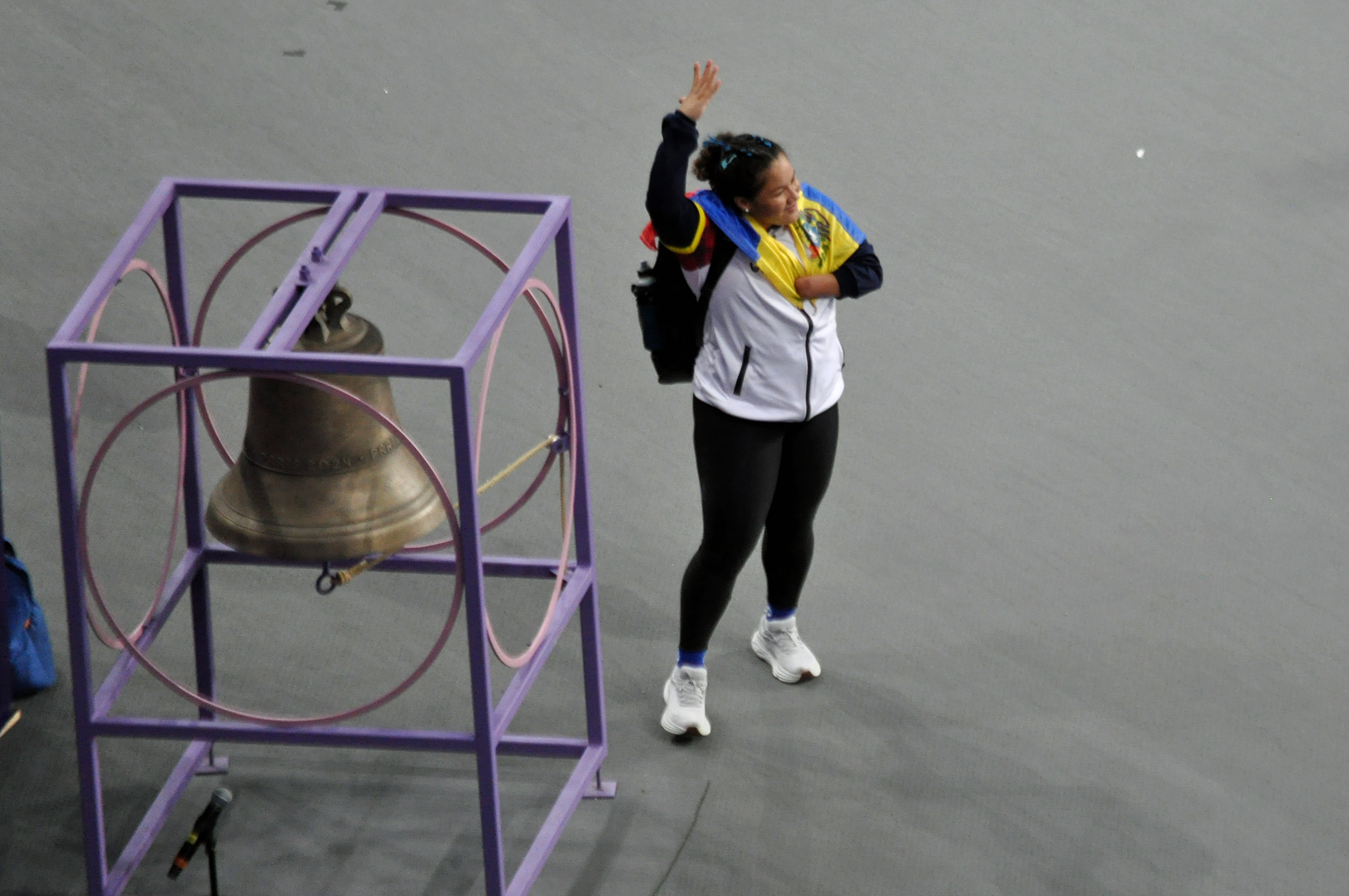
- Naibys Morillo celebrates gold in the Women's javelin F46, ringing the Paralympic bell.
- Venue: Stade de France, Paris
- Date: 6 September 2024
- Competitors: 11 from 10 nations

Medalists
1st place, gold medalist(s)		Naibys Morillo	Venezuela
2nd place, silver medalist(s)		Shahinakhon Yigitalieva	Uzbekistan
3rd place, bronze medalist(s)		Hollie Arnold	Great Britain

Records

Prior to this competition, the existing world, Paralympic, and area records were as follows:

Results

The final in this classification took place on 6 September 2024, at 19:28.

Rank	Athlete	Nationality	1	2	3	4	5	6	Best	Notes
1st place, gold medalist(s)	Naibys Morillo	Venezuela	x	41.90	39.54	37.16	40.80	43.77	43.77	PR, AR
2nd place, silver medalist(s)	Shahinakhon Yigitalieva	Uzbekistan	40.27	39.27	39.55	39.06	43.09	43.12	43.12	AR
3rd place, bronze medalist(s)	Hollie Arnold	Great Britain	38.46	40.16	40.59	37.36	36.14	39.25	40.59	
4	Noelle Roorda	Netherlands	38.57	36.89	x	36.66	40.58	40.53	40.58	
5	Ba Chaudhary	India	37.31	36.40	39.64	39.70	x	35.39	39.70	PB
6	Holly Robinson	New Zealand	39.03	x	x	x	x	x	39.03	SB
7	Saska Sokolov	Serbia	31.94	30.81	36.83	x	33.35	31.43	36.83	
8	Lise Petersen	Germany	35.20	36.01	33.75	34.66	36.62	35.68	36.62	
9	Roziyakhon Ergasheva	Uzbekistan	35.98	35.21	34.56				35.98	
10	Kenya Nayeli Lozano Mendez	Mexico	33.39	35.73	35.18				35.73	SB
11	Ishona Charles	Grenada	28.09	30.66	25.63				30.66	

=== F56 ===
Women's Javelin Throw F56 at the XVII Paralympic Games
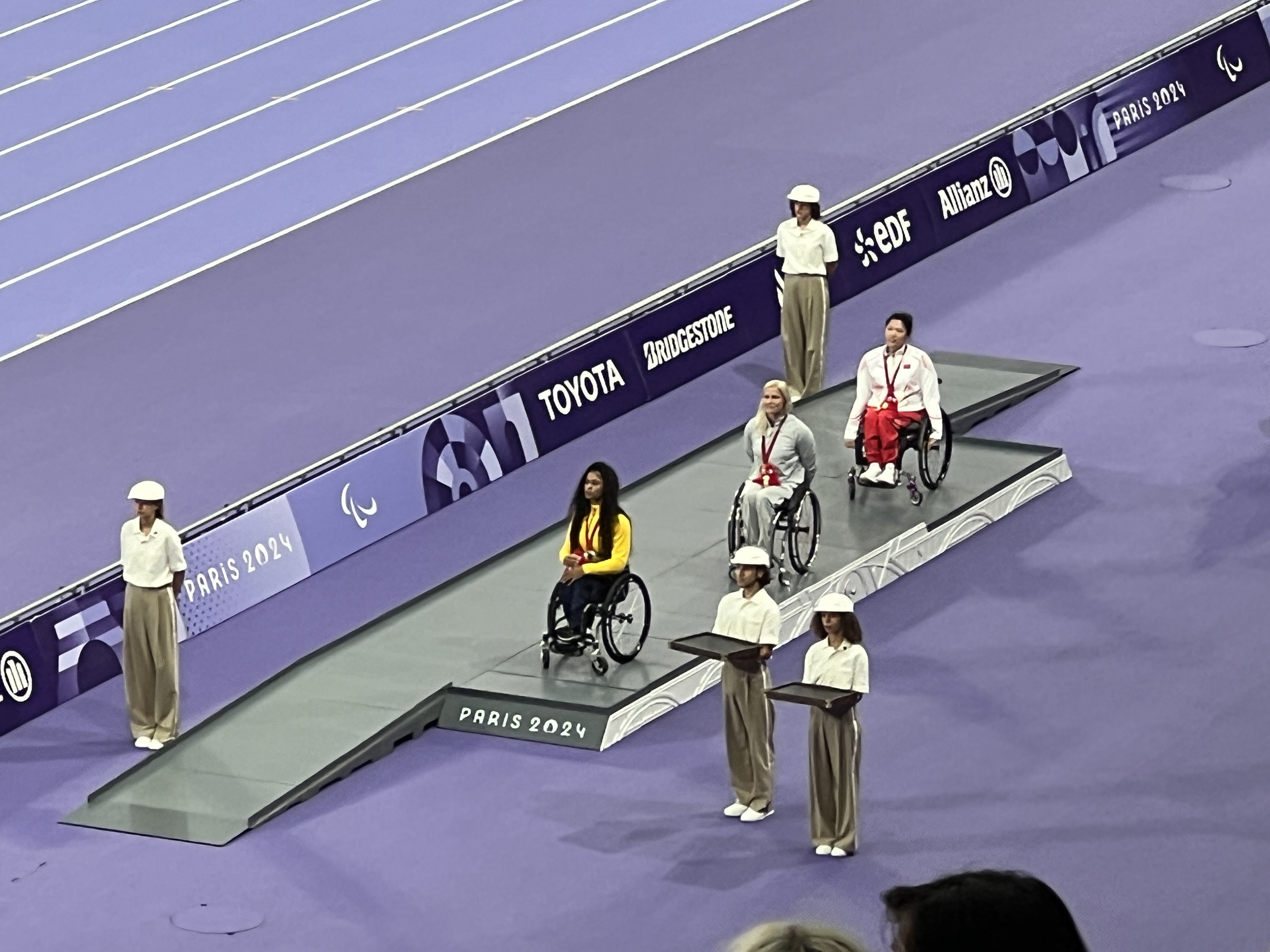
- The podium for the women's javelin F56.
- Venue: Stade de France, Paris
- Date: 3 September 2024
- Competitors: 16 from 14 nations

Medalists
1st place, gold medalist(s)		Diāna Krumina	Latvia
2nd place, silver medalist(s)		Raíssa Rocha Machado	Brazil
3rd place, bronze medalist(s)		Lin Sitong	China

The Women's javelin throw F56 event at the 2024 Summer Paralympics in Paris, took place on 3 September 2024.

==== Classification ====
The event is open to F55 and F56 athletes. These athletes are seated when throwing, they have normal arm muscle power with full or nearly full trunk movement. F55 athletes may have flickers of hip flexor, while F56 may use hip flexor

==== Records ====
Prior to the competition, the existing records were as follows:

F55 Records

World Record	Diāna Krumina (LAT)	27.07m	(United Kingdom) London	17 July 2017
Paralympic Record	Diāna Krumina (LAT)	24.22m	(Japan) Tokyo	31 August 2021

F56 Records

World Record	Raíssa Rocha Machado (BRA)	24.80m	(Brazil) São Paulo	13 March 2022
Paralympic Record	H M Moavi (IRI)	24.50m	(Japan) Tokyo	31 August 2021

==== Results ====
===== Qualification =====
The qualifying round in this classification took place on 2 September 2024: The 4 best performers (Q) advance to the final.

Rank	Athlete	Nationality	Class	1	2	3	Best	Notes
1	Maria Guadalupe Navarro Hernandez	Mexico	F55	x	17.10	16.71	17.10	Q
2	Natalya Semyanova	Uzbekistan	F55	17.00	16.86	x	17.00	Q
3	Miroslava Obrova	Czech Republic	F56	15.81	15.20	16.38	16.38	Q
4	Érica Castaño	Colombia	F55	15.98	x	16.12	16.12	Q SB
5	Dong Feixia	China	F55	14.98	15.93	15.64	15.93	SB
6	Korotoumou Coulibaly	Mali	F55	10.65	12.01	12.66	12.66	
	Mireille Nganga	Republic of the Congo	F56	x	x	x	NM	YC R6.16.1
	Iveth del Rosario Valdes Romero	Panama	F55				DNS	

===== Final =====
The final in this classification took place on 3 September 2024:

Rank	Athlete	Nationality	Class	1	2	3	4	5	6	Best	Notes
1st place, gold medalist(s)	Diāna Krumina	Latvia	F55	24.99	23.67	23.99	x	23.09	24.09	24.99	PR
2nd place, silver medalist(s)	Raíssa Rocha Machado	Brazil	F56	23.51	x	21.76	23.99	21.96	23.07	23.51	
3rd place, bronze medalist(s)	Lin Sitong	China	F55	x	22.35	x	21.03	21.53	20.39	22.35	
4	Soultana Keramyda	Greece	F56	21.70	21.48	21.33	x	x	21.96	21.96	YC R6.16.1
5	Hashemiyeh Motaghian Moavi	Iran	F56	18.78	21.16	21.51	20.06	20.61	21.69	21.69	
6	Martina Willing	Germany	F56	18.50	17.77	18.01	18.96	18.10	18.09	18.96	
7	Nadia Medjmedj	Algeria	F56	x	17.51	17.49	x	17.80	17.47	17.80	
8	Maria Guadalupe Navarro Hernandez	Mexico	F55	16.71	16.76	17.36	x	16.47	17.29	17.36	PB
9	Natalya Semyanova	Uzbekistan	F55	16.96	16.06	x	16.46	x	16.77	16.96	
10	Yessica de la Luz Jimenez Peralta	Mexico	F56	15.31	15.59	16.08	16.03	16.25	15.82	16.25	
11	Miroslava Obrova	Czech Republic	F56	14.97	14.98	15.34	15.77	15.63	15.28	15.77	YC R6.16.1
12	Érica Castaño	Colombia	F55	14.24	14.97	x	x	15.47	13.98	15.47	

Notes: YC=Yellow card for - "Noncompliance of equipment – racing chairs, running frames, throwing frames, prosthetic devices, helmets, tethers and eye masks/ opaque glasses"

=== F54 ===
Women's Javelin Throw F54 at the XVII Paralympic Games
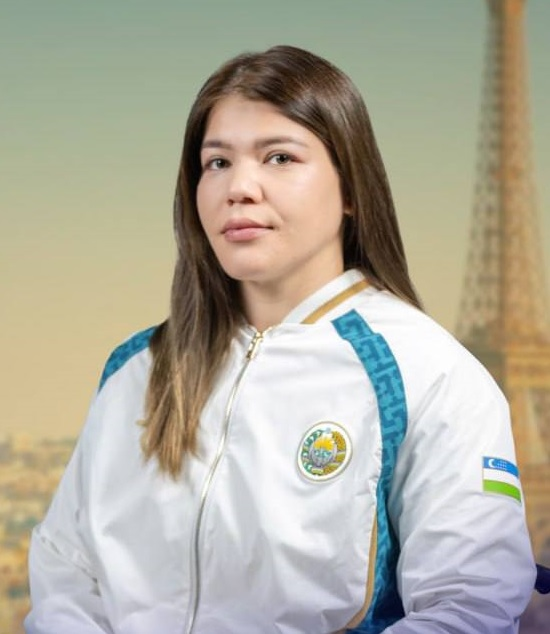
- Nurkhon Kurbanova, sometimes spelt as Nurxon Qurbonova, winner of the Women's javelin F54 for Uzbekistan.
- Venue: Stade de France, Paris
- Date: 7 September 2024
- Competitors: 6 from 6 nations

Medalists
1st place, gold medalist(s)		Nurkhon Kurbanova	Uzbekistan
2nd place, silver medalist(s)		Flora Ugwunwa	Nigeria
3rd place, bronze medalist(s)		Elham Salehi	Iran

Records

Prior to this competition, the existing world, Paralympic, and area records were as follows:

Results

The final in this classification took place on 7 September 2024, at 9:30.

Rank	Athlete	Nationality	1	2	3	4	5	6	Best	Notes
1st place, gold medalist(s)	Nurkhon Kurbanova	Uzbekistan	20.07	21.02	20.27	21.02	21.12	20.98	21.12	WR
2nd place, silver medalist(s)	Flora Ugwunwa	Nigeria	18.00	19.26	18.24	18.68	18.40	17.50	19.26	
3rd place, bronze medalist(s)	Elham Salehi	Iran	x	15.69	x	x	x	16.24	16.24	
4	Cendy Asusano	Philippines	15.05	x	14.58	14.71	14.47	x	15.05	
5	Mariia Bogacheva	Neutral Paralympic Athletes	13.03	14.35	14.26	14.18	x	14.55	14.55	
6	Maja Rajkovic	Montenegro	12.26	12.32	11.98	12.51	x	12.63	12.63	
