= 2019 World Para Athletics Championships – Women's javelin throw =

The women's javelin throw at the 2019 World Para Athletics Championships was held in Dubai on 7, 10 and 11 November 2019.

== Medalists ==
Event	Gold		Silver		Bronze	
F13	Zhao Yuping; China	46.00 WR	Anna Kulinich-Sorokina; Russia	38.87 SB	Nozimakhon Kayumova; Uzbekistan	38.86
F34	Zou Lijuan; China	19.33	Marjaana Heikkinen; Finland	18.52	Lucyna Kornobys; Poland	16.99 WR
F46	Hollie Arnold; United Kingdom	44.73 CR	Holly Robinson; New Zealand	41.60	Naibys Daniela Morillo Gil; Venezuela	40.95 AR
F54	Yang Liwan; China	18.41 SB	Flora Ugwunwa; Nigeria	18.38 SB	Hania Aidi; Tunisia	18.03
F56	Diāna Dadzīte; Latvia	25.54	Hashemiyeh Motaghian; Iran	22.67 AR	Raíssa Rocha Machado; Brazil	22.28
WR world record | AR area record | CR championship record | GR games record | NR national record | OR Olympic record | PB personal best | SB season best | WL world leading (in a given season)

== Detailed results ==
=== F13 ===
The event was held on 11 November.

Rank	Athlete	1	2	3	4	5	6	Best	Notes
1st place, gold medalist(s)	Zhao Yuping; China	42.47	x	42.77	43.53	44.95	46.00	46.00	WR
2nd place, silver medalist(s)	Anna Kulinich-Sorokina; Russia	37.85	36.51	x	38.87	35.28	37.06	38.87	SB
3rd place, bronze medalist(s)	Nozimakhon Kayumova; Uzbekistan	37.37	38.86	36.26	36.93	x	x	38.86	
4	Natalija Eder; Austria	34.73	37.65	36.40	x	33.25	34.10	37.65	SB
5	Lizaveta Piatrenka; Belarus	x	32.54	x	x	x	33.04	33.04	PB
6	Rebeca Valenzuela Álvarez; Mexico	28.40	29.57	x	27.69	32.15	30.73	32.15	
7	Bakhta Benallou; Algeria	30.42	30.78	27.81	31.05	x	28.81	31.05	PB
8	Liu Ya-ting; Chinese Taipei	23.88	25.28	27.06	26.25	26.09	26.91	27.06	
9	Sara Fernandez Roldan; Spain	x	20.89	20.62	-	-	-	20.89	

=== F34 ===
The event was held on 10 November.

Rank	Athlete	1	2	3	4	5	6	Best	Notes
1st place, gold medalist(s)	Zou Lijuan; China	x	17.56	19.33	x	18.08	x	19.33	
2nd place, silver medalist(s)	Marjaana Heikkinen; Finland	18.52	18.12	x	x	17.98	18.39	18.52	
3rd place, bronze medalist(s)	Lucyna Kornobys; Poland	16.99	14.85	15.36	x	15.18	15.27	16.99	WR
4	Frances Herrmann; Germany	14.95	15.46	15.47	14.92	15.15	15.22	15.47	
5	Saida Amoudi; Morocco	14.88	15.22	14.61	14.24	x	x	15.22	
6	Fouzia El Kassioui; Morocco	13.15	x	12.86	13.16	14.04	13.64	14.04	AR
7	Qian Zao; China	11.83	x	12.04	13.09	12.39	12.70	13.09	AR
8	Joanna Oleksiuk; Poland	11.67	11.86	11.11	x	11.94	12.09	12.09	PB

=== F46 ===
The event was held on 11 November.

Rank	Athlete	1	2	3	4	5	6	Best	Notes
1st place, gold medalist(s)	Hollie Arnold; United Kingdom	40.87	40.45	44.73	x	42.25	41.18	44.73	CR
2nd place, silver medalist(s)	Holly Robinson; New Zealand	39.65	41.60	34.73	41.09	40.42	36.35	41.60	
3rd place, bronze medalist(s)	Naibys Daniela Morillo Gil; Venezuela	37.58	30.22	34.85	36.34	40.95	40.78	40.95	AR
4	Huang Yezi; China	36.84	37.66	35.24	36.79	39.59	38.84	39.59	
5	Noëlle Roorda; Netherlands	37.79	35.72	x	36.10	39.36	36.66	39.36	PB
6	Katarzyna Piekart; Poland	33.48	33.38	31.25	34.73	31.81	33.05	34.73	SB
7	Roziyakhon Ergasheva; Uzbekistan	31.83	32.33	34.08	28.65	x	x	34.08	
8	Mariia Shpatkivska; Ukraine	31.48	32.48	29.40	32.89	32.15	30.87	32.89	PB
9	Saška Sokolov; Serbia	32.09	x	x				32.09	
10	Achoura Boukoufa; Algeria	29.95	30.76	31.55				31.55	
11	Ramya Nagaranai Shanmugam; India	25.87	x	27.48				27.48	
12	Aya Ahmed; Egypt	20.68	23.45	27.39				27.39	PB
13	Ishona Charles; Grenada	13.96	x	27.15				27.15	
14	Mariam Almatrooshi; United Arab Emirates	x	24.23	x				24.23	
15	Maryam Alhamidi; Bahrain	19.90	18.13	19.20				19.90	PB

=== F54 ===
The event was held on 7 November.

Rank	Athlete	1	2	3	4	5	6	Best	Notes
1st place, gold medalist(s)	Yang Liwan; China	16.93	17.14	17.78	18.41	x	17.65	18.41	SB
2nd place, silver medalist(s)	Flora Ugwunwa; Nigeria	16.73	17.08	x	x	18.38	17.96	18.38	SB
3rd place, bronze medalist(s)	Hania Aidi; Tunisia	17.91	x	x	x	18.03	17.79	18.03	
4	Yanive Torres Martinez; Colombia	16.35	x	16.76	x	16.72	16.78	16.78	
5	Mariia Bogacheva; Russia	14.96	14.21	14.44	15.07	15.12	14.37	15.12	
6	Nurkhon Kurbanova; Uzbekistan	14.85	15.03	x	x	x	x	15.03	PB
7	Ntombizanele Situ; South Africa	x	14.90	x	x	x	x	14.90	
8	Francisca Mardones Sepulveda; Chile	14.48	13.66	13.68	13.85	14.36	14.36	14.48	PB
9	Yuliya Nezhura; Belarus	12.77	x	x	13.17	13.17	13.24	13.24	PB
10	Iana Lebiedieva; Ukraine	10.04	x	x	11.30	x	11.52	11.52	AR
11	Amal Ali; Bahrain	9.92	9.87	10.11	x	10.32	x	10.32	

=== F56 ===
The event was held on 11 November.

Rank	Athlete	1	2	3	4	5	6	Best	Notes
1st place, gold medalist(s)	Diāna Dadzīte; Latvia	24.42	24.14	23.81	x	25.54	x	25.54	
2nd place, silver medalist(s)	Hashemiyeh Motaghian; Iran	x	21.16	22.35	22.67	x	21.30	22.67	AR
3rd place, bronze medalist(s)	Raíssa Rocha Machado; Brazil	21.96	22.28	21.77	21.80	20.83	x	22.28	
4	Nadia Medjmedj; Algeria	x	x	20.07	21.00	19.99	x	21.00	AR
5	Martina Willing; Germany	20.44	x	20.97	20.49	20.17	20.97	20.97	
6	Lin Sitong; China	19.04	x	20.25	x	19.86	19.90	20.25	
7	Daniela Todorova; Bulgaria	17.12	x	x	18.01	17.96	18.27	18.27	
8	Natalya Semyonova; Uzbekistan	18.04	17.91	17.69	x	x	18.04	18.04	PB
9	Zhang Jiayu; China	17.43	17.40	x	16.62	17.14	17.29	17.43	
10	Miroslava Obrova; Czech Republic	14.16	14.84	14.59	x	15.47	13.87	15.47	
11	Nelly Jeptoo Sile; Kenya	14.41	14.41	14.60	x	14.26	13.68	14.60	
12	Korotoumou Coulibaly; Mali	x	13.33	11.52	13.20	11.13	x	13.33	

== See also ==
- List of IPC world records in athletics
