= 2023 World Para Athletics Championships – Women's javelin throw =

The women's javelin throw events at the 2023 World Para Athletics Championships were held at Charlety Stadium, Paris, France, from 10 to 17 July.

== Medalists ==
Event	Gold	Silver	Bronze
F13	Zhao Yuping; China	Nozimakhon Kayumova; Uzbekistan	Natalija Eder; Austria
F34	Zou Lijuan; China	Frances Herrmann; Germany	Marjaana Heikkinen; Finland
F46	Hollie Arnold; Great Britain	Saška Sokolov; Serbia	Naibys Morillo Gil; Venezuela
F54	Nurkhon Kurbanova; Uzbekistan	Elham Salehi; Iran	Pooja; India
F56	Diana Krumina; Latvia	Raíssa Rocha Machado; Brazil	Hashemiyeh Motaghian; Iran

== Results ==
=== F13 ===
The final of the Women's Javelin Throw F13 event took place at 9:08 on 10 Jul 2023. Athletes from both F12 and F13 classifications took part.

Rank	Athlete	Attempt						Result	Notes
Rank	Athlete	1	2	3	4	5	6	Result	Notes
1st place, gold medalist(s)	Zhao Yuping (CHN)	45.82	40.4	43.9	37.52	X	36.75	45.82	SB
2nd place, silver medalist(s)	Nozimakhon Kayumova (UZB)	39.13	39.92	40.78	37.29	37.35	X	40.78	SB
3rd place, bronze medalist(s)	Natalija Eder (AUT)	34.48	34.63	X	X	X	32.05	34.63	
4	Bakhta Benallou (ALG)	29.76	X	29.82	31	30.57	28.45	31	SB
5	Fatme Ismail (BUL)	28.47	27.44	27.72	28.02	29.19	27.49	29.19	
6	Serap Demirkapu (TUR)	X	X	X	27.46	X	X	27.46	PB
7	Liu Ya-Ting (TPE)	25.04	25.79	25.54	23.27	24.68	25.52	25.79	
8	Cai-Syuan Wang (TPE)	20.96	20.59	X	18.42	X	20.66	20.96	

=== F34 ===
The final of the Women's Javelin Throw F34 took place at 18:34 on 11 Jul 2023.

Rank	Athlete	Attempt						Result	Notes
Rank	Athlete	1	2	3	4	5	6	Result	Notes
1st place, gold medalist(s)	Zou Lijuan (CHN)	19.84	20.74	20.13	19.35	19.32	19.18	20.74	CR
2nd place, silver medalist(s)	Frances Herrmann (GER)	17.74	17.29	17.13	17.30	17.28	17.42	17.74	SB
3rd place, bronze medalist(s)	Marjaana Heikkinen (FIN)	X	16.75	X	16.90	16.90	16.52	16.90	SB
4	Dayna Crees (AUS)	X	16.82	16.55	16.84	16.74	X	16.84	AR
5	Yousra Ben Jemaa (TUN)	16.57	15.76	14.25	X	X	15.65	16.57	
6	Qian Zao (CHN)	X	X	15.26	14.9	15.78	15.46	15.78	AR
7	Fouzia El Kassioui (MAR)	13.38	X	14.35	X	14.64	15.24	15.24	AR
8	Saida Amoudi (MAR)	X	X	X	X	X	14.6	14.6	
9	Miriam Martinez Rico (ESP)	X	13.84	X	14.23	X	X	14.23	PB
10	Joanna Oleksiuk (POL)	11.77	r	-	-	-	-	11.77	

=== F46 ===
The final of the Women's Javelin Throw F46 event took place at 09:26 a.m. on 12 Jul 2023.

Rank	Athlete	Attempt						Result	Notes
Rank	Athlete	1	2	3	4	5	6"	Result	Notes
1st place, gold medalist(s)	Hollie Arnold (GBR)	37.36	36.59	39.49	41.06	37.37	39.97	41.06	SB
2nd place, silver medalist(s)	Saska Sokolov (SRB)	X	34.42	39.64	38.19	36.93	39.96	39.96	PB
3rd place, bronze medalist(s)	Naibys Daniela Morillo Gil (VEN)	34.1	35.11	37.27	X	X	39.4	39.4	
4	Holly Robinson (NZL)	36.36	38.97	X	X	36.77	X	38.97	SB
5	Roziyakhon Ergasheva (UZB)	35.46	34.39	34.09	38.01	37.97	36.27	38.01	PB
6	Noelle Roorda (NED)	35.69	35.75	36.11	36.44	X	37.93	37.93	SB
7	Kenya Nayeli Lozano (MEX)	34.25	32.93	33.61	32.35	30.42	34.72	34.72	
8	Lise Petersen (GER)	33.17	32.24	32.51	X	31.44	X	33.17	
9	Shi Gaiting (CHN)	32.15	30.94	32.8				32.8	PB
10	Huang Yezi (CHN)	31.43	32.72	X				32.72	
11	Juane Le Roux (RSA)	X	31.17	25.18				31.17	PB
12	Achoura Boukoufa (ALG)	30.29	30.71	X				30.71	SB
13	Jiamin Zhang (CHN)	21.46	X	25.98				25.98	
14	Dorna Longbut (PNG)	15.93	X	24.34				24.34	
15	Suzana Nahirnei (BRA)	22.41	20.55	22.04				22.41	SB
16	Mariam Almatrooshi (UAE)	18.77	18.57	-				18.77	

=== F54 ===
The final of the Women's Javelin Throw F54 event took place at 9:00 on 17 Jul 2023.

Rank	Athlete	Attempt						Result	Notes
Rank	Athlete	1	2	3	4	5	6	Result	Notes
1st place, gold medalist(s)	Nurkhon Kurbanova (UZB)	19.11	19.29	19.58	X	19.60	20.15	20.15	CR
2nd place, silver medalist(s)	Elham Salehi (IRI)	16.16	17.08	16.93	16.79	16.71	16.89	17.08	PB
3rd place, bronze medalist(s)	Pooja (IND)	13.49	13.59	14.7	13.96	14.04	13.8	14.70	PB
4	Maja Rajkovic (MNE)	13.05	12.82	13.37	12.65	13.57	12.29	13.57	
5	Elizabeth Rodrigues (BRA)	12.73	12.85	X	X	12.74	12.85	12.85	CR

=== F56 ===
The final of the Women's Javelin Throw F56 event took place at 9:00 on 13 Jul 2023.

Rank	Athlete	Attempt						Result	Notes
Rank	Athlete	1	2	3	4	5	6	Result	Notes
1st place, gold medalist(s)	Diana Krumina (LAT)	X	23.57	23.99	24.75	25.22	25.81	23.86	SB
2nd place, silver medalist(s)	Raissa Rocha Machado (BRA)	23.05	X	X	22.87	22.96	X	23.05	
3rd place, bronze medalist(s)	Hashemiyeh Motaghian (IRI)	21.89	22.78	22.41	22.12	22.95	22.26	22.95	SB
4	Lin Sitong (CHN)	19.36	20.32	20.92	21.25	20.3	X	21.25	SB
5	Nadia Medjmedj (ALG)	18.88	17.89	X	18.9		X	18.90	SB
6	Fatou Kine Ndiaye (SEN)	15.03	15.03	X	16.01	15.67	16.04	16.68	
7	Miroslava Obrova (CZE)	15.64	15.64	14.4	15.32	15.41	15.46	15.64	
8	Dong Feixia (CHN)	14.89	14.89	13.99	14.08	15.20	15.21	15.56	
9	Hortence Mendy (SEN)	13.85	13.85	14.26	14.50	13.52	14.02	14.50	
10	Iveth del Rosario Valdes (PAN)	13.75	13.75	14.1	14.21	12.95	13.28	14.21	
11	Sakshi Kasana (IND)	12.96	12.96	12.13	X	12.94	13.31	13.31	
12	Nadha Alhumaydani (KSA)	X	X	8.98	9.11	11.56	X	11.56	
