= 2025 World Para Athletics Championships – Women's javelin throw =

The women's javelin throw events at the 2025 World Para Athletics Championships were held at the Jawaharlal Nehru Stadium, Delhi in New Delhi.

== Medalists ==
Event	Gold	Silver	Bronze
F13	Zhao Yuping; China	Sheilla Wanyoyi; Kenya	Anna Kulinich-Sorokina; Neutral Paralympic Athletes
F34	Zou Lijuan; China	Zuo Caiyun; China	Dayna Crees; Australia
F46	Noëlle Roorda; Netherlands	Shahinakhon Yigitalieva; Uzbekistan	Hollie Arnold; Great Britain
F54	Elham Salehi; Iran	Alondra Salazar; Mexico	Rebeca Citlaly Cortés; Mexico
F56	Diāna Krumina; Latvia	Raíssa Rocha Machado; Brazil	Zeinab Moradi Rashnou; Iran

== F13 ==
Final

The event took place on 28 September.

Rank	Name	Nationality	Сlass	#1	#2	#3	#4	#5	#6	Result	Notes
1st place, gold medalist(s)	Zhao Yuping	China	F12	45.22	44.98	44.70	44.27	43.61	43.83	45.22	SB
2nd place, silver medalist(s)	Sheilla Wanyoyi	Kenya	F12	37.08	35.24	30.92	26.46	32.90	38.63	38.63	AF
3rd place, bronze medalist(s)	Anna Kulinich-Sorokina	Neutral Paralympic Athletes	F12	33.33	36.44	x	37.74	34.89	37.16	37.74	SB
4	Lizaveta Dabravolskaya	Neutral Paralympic Athletes	F13	37.20	35.28	37.62	34.47	33.83	x	37.62	
5	Natalija Eder	Austria	F12	x	x	33.86	30.46	33.65	34.62	34.62	
6	Serap Demirkapu	Turkey	F12	28.60	33.23	31.08	x	x	30.62	33.23	PB
7	Ashlyn Renneberg	Canada	F13	x	29.14	x	x	x	33.20	33.20	AM
8	Liu Ya-ting	Chinese Taipei	F12	27.29	27.24	28.27	27.97	28.57	27.03	28.57	SB
9	Fatme Ismail	Bulgaria	F12	18.20	x	x				18.20	

== F34 ==
Final

The event took place on 29 September.

Rank	Name	Nationality	Сlass	#1	#2	#3	#4	#5	#6	Result	Notes
1st place, gold medalist(s)	Zou Lijuan	China	F34	20.45	20.69	x	21.41	20.20	20.37	21.41	CR
2nd place, silver medalist(s)	Zuo Caiyun	China	F34	19.98	20.58	19.72	x	20.23	x	20.58	PB
3rd place, bronze medalist(s)	Dayna Crees	Australia	F34	17.78	18.78	18.97	18.44	18.48	18.39	18.97	OC
4	Frances Herrmann	Germany	F34	17.10	16.96	17.57	17.51	17.74	17.91	17.91	
5	Julia Hanes	Canada	F33	15.13	x	16.41	16.49	16.86	16.72	16.86	AM
6	Galina Lipatnikova	Neutral Paralympic Athletes	F34	14.14	x	14.14	16.36	16.01	x	16.36	PB
7	Yousra Ben Jemaa	Tunisia	F34	15.72	15.45	x	x	x	15.44	15.72	
8	Qian Zao	China	F33	14.71	15.42	15.40	15.37	15.19	15.14	15.42	
9	Elena Orlova	Neutral Paralympic Athletes	F34	12.57	14.07	14.37	14.26	14.21	13.43	14.37	PB
10	Asmahan Boudjadar	Algeria	F33	x	11.43	x	11.91	12.48	12.38	12.48	

Qualification

The event took place on 28 September. Qualification: The 4 best performers (q) advance to the Final

Rank	Name	Nationality	Сlass	#1	#2	#3	Result	Notes
1	Galina Lipatnikova	Neutral Paralympic Athletes	F34	14.96	16.20	14.48	16.20	q, PB
2	Qian Zao	China	F33	14.34	15.31	x	15.31	q
3	Asmahan Boudjadar	Algeria	F33	x	x	14.21	14.21	q, PB
4	Elena Orlova	Neutral Paralympic Athletes	F34	x	13.75	13.51	13.75	q, SB
5	Vera Isakova	Neutral Paralympic Athletes	F33	12.95	13.71	13.45	13.71	SB

== F46 ==
Final

The event took place on 27 September.

Rank	Name	Nationality	Сlass	#1	#2	#3	#4	#5	#6	Result	Notes
1st place, gold medalist(s)	Noëlle Roorda	Netherlands	F46	40.98	42.02	42.84	43.74	42.36	41.54	43.74	PB
2nd place, silver medalist(s)	Shahinakhon Yigitalieva	Uzbekistan	F46	37.78	39.62	37.93	37.35	41.97	39.94	41.97	SB
3rd place, bronze medalist(s)	Hollie Arnold	Great Britain	F46	41.94	41.81	x	40.84	41.24	41.24	41.94	SB
4	Husnorakhon Kudratullaeva	Uzbekistan	F46	39.57	37.29	x	x	37.25	37.67	39.57	PB
5	Huang Yezi	China	F46	35.50	38.67	37.79	37.48	38.17	37.80	38.67	SB
6	Karomat Omonova	Uzbekistan	F46	36.27	38.56	36.11	33.15	35.71	x	38.56	PB
7	Lise Petersen	Germany	F46	34.02	36.37	36.46	36.42	x	x	36.46	
8	Bhavanaben Ajabaji Chaudhary	India	F46	34.81	35.34	x	x	x	x	35.34	
9	Cintia Frasquet y Sanchez	Spain	F46	32.68	33.22	x				33.22	
10	Shi Gaiting	China	F46	29.63	31.04	28.00				31.04	SB
11	Anna Harriet Anzoa	Uganda	F46	30.44	28.23	26.33				30.44	PB

== F54 ==
Final

The event took place on 1 October.

Rank	Name	Nationality	Сlass	#1	#2	#3	#4	#5	#6	Result	Notes
1st place, gold medalist(s)	Elham Salehi	Iran	F54	16.82	16.51	16.12	x	17.06	x	17.06	SB
2nd place, silver medalist(s)	Alondra Salazar	Mexico	F54	15.82	16.81	x	16.83	x	16.72	16.83	PB
3rd place, bronze medalist(s)	Rebeca Citlaly Cortés	Mexico	F54	14.14	15.48	14.10	14.64	14.57	14.55	15.48	PB
4	Yuliya Nezhura	Neutral Paralympic Athletes	F54	13.22	x	13.47	12.19	14.55	13.80	14.55	
5	Mariia Bogacheva	Neutral Paralympic Athletes	F54	13.72	12.55	13.84	13.06	13.51	13.46	13.84	

== F56 ==
Final

The event took place on 1 October.

Rank	Name	Nationality	Сlass	#1	#2	#3	#4	#5	#6	Result	Notes
1st place, gold medalist(s)	Diāna Krumina	Latvia	F55	24.55	26.02	26.18	x	24.22	x	26.18	SB
2nd place, silver medalist(s)	Raíssa Rocha Machado	Brazil	F56	x	23.90	22.68	x	22.97	22.89	23.90	CR
3rd place, bronze medalist(s)	Zeinab Moradi Rashnou	Iran	F56	21.85	x	x	20.69	21.98	22.06	22.06	
4	Soultana Keramyda	Greece	F56	21.43	22.02	x	x	x	x	22.02	SB
5	María Guadalupe Navarro Hernández	Mexico	F55	20.89	20.01	20.57	19.93	20.46	x	20.89	AM
6	Suchitra Parida	India	F55	x	x	17.57	x	18.29	x	18.29	PB
7	Nataliia Chebakova	Neutral Paralympic Athletes	F55	14.98	15.85	15.85	15.76	15.83	16.31	16.31	SB
8	Miroslava Obrova	Czech Republic	F56	15.49	15.85	15.45	15.97	15.88	16.10	16.10	
9	Saki Komatsu	Japan	F55	15.75	15.34	x	14.62	x	14.87	15.75	
10	Amalia Ortuño	Costa Rica	F56	15.32	15.32	14.95	14.40	x	13.49	15.32	PB
11	Cendy Asusano	Philippines	F55	x	10.72	x	10.96	11.49	10.50	11.49	
