= Athletics at the 2020 Summer Paralympics – Women's javelin throw =

The Women's javelin throw athletics events for the 2020 Summer Paralympics took place at the Tokyo National Stadium from August 28 to September 4, 2021. A total of 5 events were contested in this discipline.

== Schedule ==
R	Round 1	½	Semifinals	F	Final

Date	Sat 28		Sun 29		Mon 30		Tue 31		Wed 1		Thu 2		Fri 3		Sat 4	
Event	M	E	M	E	M	E	M	E	M	E	M	E	M	E	M	E
F13	F															
F34				F												
F46														F		
F54															F	
F56							F									

== Medal summary ==
The following is a summary of the medals awarded across all javelin throw events.

Classification	Gold		Silver		Bronze	
F13	Nozimakhon Kayumova; Uzbekistan	42.59	Zhao Yuping; China	41.85	Lizaveta Piatrenka; Belarus	38.99 AR
F34	Zou Lijuan; China	22.28 WR	Frances Herrmann; Germany	17.72	Marjaana Heikkinen; Finland	17.47
F46	Holly Robinson; New Zealand	40.99	Noëlle Roorda; Netherlands	40.06	Hollie Arnold; Great Britain	39.73
F54	Flora Ugwunwa; Nigeria	19.39	Nurkhon Kurbanova; Uzbekistan	18.38	Yang Liwan; China	17.83
F56	Hashemiyeh Motaghian; Iran	24.50 WR	Raíssa Rocha Machado; Brazil	24.39 AR	Diāna Dadzīte; Latvia	24.22

== Results ==
=== F13 ===
Records

Prior to this competition, the existing world, Paralympic, and area records were as follows:

World record	Nozimakhon Kayumova (UZB)	44.58	Rio de Janeiro, Brazil	17 September 2016
Paralympic record	Nozimakhon Kayumova (UZB)	44.58	Rio de Janeiro, Brazil	17 September 2016

Area	Distance (m)	Athlete	Nation
Africa	31.05	Record Mark	
America	32.23	Record Mark	
Asia	44.58 WR	Nozimakhon Kayumova	Uzbekistan
Europe	37.33	Lizaveta Piatrenka	Belarus
Oceania	36.04	Isabelle Hampton	Australia

Results

The final in this classification took place on 28 August 2021, at 11:06:

Rank	Athlete	Nationality	Class	1	2	3	4	5	6	Best	Notes
1st place, gold medalist(s)	Nozimakhon Kayumova	Uzbekistan	F13	41.99	41.20	40.21	42.59	42.16	39.06	42.59	SB
2nd place, silver medalist(s)	Zhao Yuping	China	F12	39.68	39.07	31.63	32.33	39.56	41.85	41.85	SB
3rd place, bronze medalist(s)	Lizaveta Piatrenka	Belarus	F13	x	36.60	37.04	38.74	38.56	38.99	38.99	AR
4	Natalija Eder	Austria	F12	34.95	37.70	37.92	35.86	37.13	34.68	37.92	SB
5	Anna Kulinich-Sorokina	RPC	F12	37.17	35.85	34.80	37.48	34.59	35.63	37.48	
6	Liu Ya-ting	Chinese Taipei	F12	31.00	31.94	30.68	30.17	29.82	32.44	32.44	SB
7	Rebeca Valenzuela Álvarez	Mexico	F12	30.02	x	–	–	–	–	30.02	
8	Fatme Ismail	Bulgaria	F12	25.52	17.93	24.88	21.10	26.84	x	26.84	PB

=== F34 ===
Records

Prior to this competition, the existing world, Paralympic, and area records were as follows:

World record	Zou Lijuan (CHN)	22.28	Jakarta, Indonesia	11 October 2018
Paralympic record	Zou Lijuan (CHN)	21.86	Rio de Janeiro, Brazil	9 September 2016

Area	Distance (m)	Athlete	Nation
Africa	17.41	Yousra Ben Jemaa	Tunisia
America	15.44	Wendis Mejias Viloria	Venezuela
Asia	22.28 WR	Zou Lijuan	China
Europe	19.58	Marjaana Heikkinen	Finland
Oceania	14.36	Record Mark	

Results

The final in this classification took place on 29 August 2021, at 19:49:

Rank	Athlete	Nationality	Class	1	2	3	4	5	6	Best	Notes
1st place, gold medalist(s)	Zou Lijuan	China	F34	21.41	21.99	22.20	x	22.28	x	22.28	=WR
2nd place, silver medalist(s)	Frances Herrmann	Germany	F34	17.72	17.38	17.11	17.61	17.28	17.43	17.72	SB
3rd place, bronze medalist(s)	Marjaana Heikkinen	Finland	F34	x	17.47	17.18	16.91	17.31	17.39	17.47	
4	Yousra Ben Jemaa	Tunisia	F34	16.08	x	x	x	15.12	x	16.08	
5	Wendis Mejias Viloria	Venezuela	F34	15.88	x	15.78	x	15.27	15.90	15.90	AR
6	Saida Amoudi	Morocco	F34	x	15.23	x	15.29	15.26	x	15.29	
7	Fouzia El Kassioui	Morocco	F33	13.82	12.38	14.18	x	12.22	x	14.18	
8	Sawsen Ben Mbarek	Tunisia	F34	x	12.20	x	x	13.00	12.43	13.00	PB
9	Joanna Oleksiuk	Poland	F33	10.25	12.09	10.80	-	-	-	12.09	

=== F46 ===
Records

Prior to this competition, the existing world, Paralympic, and area records were as follows:

World record	Holly Robinson (NZL)	45.73	Sydney, Australia	6 April 2019
Paralympic record	Hollie Arnold (GBR)	43.01	Rio de Janeiro, Brazil	13 September 2016

Area	Distance (m)	Athlete	Nation
Africa	33.79	Achoura Boukoufa	Algeria
America	40.95	Naibys Daniela Morillo Gil	Venezuela
Asia	41.97	Huang Yezi	China
Europe	44.73	Hollie Arnold	Great Britain
Oceania	45.73 WR	Holly Robinson	New Zealand

Results

The final in this classification took place on 3 September 2021, at 19:28:

Rank	Athlete	Nationality	1	2	3	4	5	6	Best	Notes
1st place, gold medalist(s)	Holly Robinson	New Zealand	37.46	38.68	x	38.75	38.40	40.99	40.99	
2nd place, silver medalist(s)	Noëlle Roorda	Netherlands	37.71	38.99	38.90	36.78	39.26	40.06	40.06	PB
3rd place, bronze medalist(s)	Hollie Arnold	Great Britain	39.05	x	37.37	39.73	37.20	34.48	39.73	
4	Naibys Daniela Morillo Gil	Venezuela	35.02	38.33	32.88	36.28	32.51	37.17	38.33	
5	Saška Sokolov	Serbia	33.85	32.91	x	32.01	34.55	36.09	36.09	
6	Huang Yezi	China	32.60	32.53	34.00	34.76	31.47	34.49	34.76	SB
7	Lise Petersen	Germany	x	29.33	32.46	28.51	31.62	29.98	32.46	
8	Achoura Boukoufa	Algeria	30.27	29.77	30.69	31.01	28.39	x	31.01	
9	Ishona Charles	Grenada	28.75	x	28.17	Did not advance			28.75	
10	Juan Faith Jackson	Sierra Leone	24.16	21.33	x	Did not advance			24.16	PB
11	Nelly Ruth Leva	Papua New Guinea	x	x	23.30	Did not advance			23.30	PB

=== F54 ===
Records

Prior to this competition, the existing world, Paralympic, and area records were as follows:

World record	Flora Ugwunwa (NGR)	20.25	Rio de Janeiro, Brazil	13 September 2016
Paralympic record	Flora Ugwunwa (NGR)	20.25	Rio de Janeiro, Brazil	13 September 2016

Area	Distance (m)	Athlete	Nation
Africa	20.25 WR	Flora Ugwunwa	Nigeria
America	16.92	Yanive Torres Martinez	Colombia
Asia	18.50	Yang Liwan	China
Europe	15.79	Mariia Bogacheva	Russia
Oceania	12.02	Asti Poole	Australia

Results

The final in this classification took place on 4 September 2021, at 9:30:

Rank	Athlete	Nationality	Class	1	2	3	4	5	6	Best	Notes
1st place, gold medalist(s)	Flora Ugwunwa	Nigeria	F54	18.38	19.08	x	18.85	19.39	17.89	19.39	SB
2nd place, silver medalist(s)	Nurkhon Kurbanova	Uzbekistan	F54	18.38	17.80	17.35	x	18.02	16.53	18.38	PB
3rd place, bronze medalist(s)	Yang Liwan	China	F54	17.21	17.04	x	17.19	17.66	17.83	17.83	SB
4	Yanive Torres Martinez	Colombia	F54	16.12	x	15.49	16.26	15.39	15.32	16.26	SB
5	Zanele Situ	South Africa	F54	15.68	x	x	16.22	x	x	16.22	
6	Mariia Bogacheva	RPC	F54	15.14	14.94	x	x	15.22	14.66	15.22	SB
7	Poliana Jesus	Brazil	F54	x	12.65	13.61	x	13.69	13.04	13.69	
8	Iana Lebiedieva	Ukraine	F53	x	11.00	11.70	11.89	11.32	x	11.89	WR (F53)

=== F56 ===
Records

Prior to this competition, the existing world, Paralympic, and area records were as follows:

World record	Martina Willing (GER)	24.03	Berlin, Germany	13 June 2008
Paralympic record	Martina Willing (GER)	23.99	Beijing, China	14 September 2008

Area	Distance (m)	Athlete	Nation
Africa	21.00	Nadia Medjmedj	Algeria
America	23.96	Raíssa Rocha Machado	Brazil
Asia	22.67	Hashemiyeh Motaghian	Iran
Europe	24.03 WR	Martina Willing	Germany
Oceania	17.88	Jenni Bryce	Australia

Results

The final in this classification took place on 31 August 2021, at 10:12:

Rank	Athlete	Nationality	Class	1	2	3	4	5	6	Best	Notes
1st place, gold medalist(s)	Hashemiyeh Motaghian	Iran	F56	22.94	22.98	24.50	24.14	24.42	22.88	24.50	WR
2nd place, silver medalist(s)	Raíssa Rocha Machado	Brazil	F56	23.62	23.87	24.39	22.94	23.22	23.39	24.39	AR
3rd place, bronze medalist(s)	Diāna Dadzīte	Latvia	F55	23.98	x	23.68	24.22	x	23.34	24.22	PR
4	Nadia Medjmedj	Algeria	F56	18.60	17.99	x	x	20.02	x	20.02	SB
5	Martina Willing	Germany	F56	19.11	19.78	x	19.61	18.50	x	19.78	
6	Fatou Kiné N'Diaye	Senegal	F56	14.69	x	14.52	15.46	14.70	15.43	15.46	PB
7	Korotoumou Coulibaly	Mali	F55	x	13.73	x	14.64	12.80	x	14.64	SB
8	Iveth Valdes Romero	Panama	F55	13.24	14.40	x	13.25	x	x	14.40	SB
9	Patience Johnson	Liberia	F55	9.12	9.69	9.55	10.03	x	x	10.03	PB
