= Athletics at the 2016 Summer Paralympics – Women's javelin throw =

The women's javelin throw athletics events for the 2016 Summer Paralympics take place at the Rio Olympic Stadium from 9 September. A total of 6 events are contested for 6 different classifications.

== Competition format ==
The competition for each classification consisted of a single round. Each athlete threw three times, after which the eight best threw three more times (with the best distance of the six throws counted).

== Medal summary ==
Classification	Gold		Silver		Bronze	
F13	Nozimakhon Kayumova; Uzbekistan	44.58	Irada Aliyeva; Azerbaijan	42.58	Natalija Eder; Austria	40.49
F34	Zou Lijuan; China	21.86	Marjaana Heikkinen; Finland	18.42	Frances Herrmann; Germany	18.16
F37	Shirlene Coelho; Brazil	37.57	Mi Na; China	30.18	Jia Qianqian; China	29.47
F46	Hollie Arnold; Great Britain	43.01	Holly Robinson; New Zealand	41.22	Katarzyna Piekart; Poland	41.07
F54	Flora Ugwunwa; Nigeria	20.25	Hania Aidi; Tunisia	18.88	Ntombizanele Situ; South Africa	17.90
F58	Diāna Dadzīte; Latvia	23.26	Martina Willing; Germany	22.22	Nadia Medjmedj; Algeria	20.24

== Results ==
=== F13 ===
The F13 event took place on 17 September.

Rank	Athlete	category	1	2	3	4	5	6	Best	Notes
1st place, gold medalist(s)	Nozimakhon Kayumova (UZB)	F13	41.27	44.58	43.25	40.76	x	42.49	44.58	WR
2nd place, silver medalist(s)	Irada Aliyeva (AZE)	F12	39.27	x	39.63	41.57	42.58	41.59	42.58	PR
3rd place, bronze medalist(s)	Natalija Eder (AUT)	F12	40.49	37.52	x	34.50	38.25	37.51	40.49	PB
4	Zhao Yuping (CHN)	F12	38.11	32.68	39.59	x	37.94	34.44	39.59	
5	Liu Ya-ting (TPE)	F12	35.18	31.05	32.59	x	32.68	32.50	35.18	
6	Rebeca Valenzuela Álvarez (MEX)	F12	x	x	-	-	R		NM	

=== F34 ===
The F34 event took place on 9 September.

Rank	Athlete	1	2	3	4	5	6	Best	Notes
1st place, gold medalist(s)	Zou Lijuan (CHN)	21.00	21.68	21.86	17.87	18.17	18.97	21.86	WR
2nd place, silver medalist(s)	Marjaana Heikkinen (FIN)	x	x	18.42	x	x	x	18.42	SB
3rd place, bronze medalist(s)	Frances Herrmann (GER)	18.14	17.14	18.16	17.40	17.85	17.39	18.16	
4	Lucyna Kornobys (POL)	17.42	17.88	16.74	16.42	x	x	17.88	SB
5	Louadjeda Benoumessad (ALG)	16.96	x	x	14.61	x	x	16.96	
6	Yousra Ben Jemaa (TUN)	15.29	x	15.07	x	x	x	15.29	
7	Maryam Soltani (IRI)	14.84	15.00	x	x	x	x	15.00	
8	Saida Amoudi (MAR)	12.97	14.24	13.87	13.22	13.16	x	14.24	

=== F37 ===
The F37 event took place on 10 September.

Rank	Athlete	1	2	3	4	5	6	Best	Notes
1st place, gold medalist(s)	Shirlene Coelho (BRA)	35.55	37.34	37.57	32.73	37.10	x	37.57	SB
2nd place, silver medalist(s)	Mi Na (CHN)	x	30.18	28.35	28.96	x	x	30.18	PB
3rd place, bronze medalist(s)	Jia Qianqian (CHN)	x	x	x	29.47	x	x	29.47	
4	Yomaira Cohen (VEN)	26.96	28.56	28.51	28.46	28.14	26.98	28.56	
5	Rae Anderson (AUS)	25.58	28.46	27.88	25.98	26.22	27.83	28.46	PB
6	Eva Berna (CZE)	20.66	x	x	x	21.79	23.27	23.27	PB
7	Caitlin Dore (NZL)	19.55	x	x	20.87	20.74	20.49	20.87	

=== F46 ===
The F46 event took place on 13 September.

Rank	Athlete	1	2	3	4	5	6	Best	Notes
1st place, gold medalist(s)	Hollie Arnold (GBR)	41.10	41.68	38.28	38.70	x	43.01	43.01	WR
2nd place, silver medalist(s)	Holly Robinson (NZL)	40.80	38.92	40.13	40.83	41.22	40.62	41.22	OC
3rd place, bronze medalist(s)	Katarzyna Piekart (POL)	40.80	41.07	39.15	35.69	36.90	34.66	41.07	SB
4	Zhao Hongmei (CHN)	39.50	38.16	38.47	x	39.82	39.44	39.82	AS
5	Madeleine Hogan (AUS)	37.53	39.75	39.28	38.76	37.69	37.52	39.75	SB
6	Saška Sokolov (SRB)	33.26	32.20	29.44	31.41	28.26	32.17	33.26	
7	Surang Khamsuk (THA)	x	x	23.00	28.46	x	26.68	28.46	SB
8	Maryam Almatrooshi (UAE)	25.11	x	26.69	x	25.41	26.94	26.94	

=== F54 ===
The F54 event took place on 13 September.

Rank	Athlete	1	2	3	4	5	6	Best	Notes
1st place, gold medalist(s)	Flora Ugwunwa (NGR)	20.25	17.88	x	x	18.04	18.72	20.25	WR
2nd place, silver medalist(s)	Hania Aidi (TUN)	18.28	x	18.88	17.45	18.23	x	18.88	PB
3rd place, bronze medalist(s)	Ntombizanele Situ (RSA)	17.18	17.88	17.90	17.52	16.73	x	17.90	PB
4	Yang Liwan (CHN)	x	x	17.30	16.80	17.39	17.52	17.52	
5	Poliana Jesus (BRA)	13.94	13.96	13.72	13.17	13.69	12.61	13.96	
6	Estela Salas (MEX)	x	10.83	x	x	11.62	11.16	11.62	SB
7	Raya Al'abri (OMA)	9.27	x	x	8.67	x	9.57	9.57	PB
	Yanive Torres Martinez (COL)	x	x	x				NM	
	Fadhila Nafati (TUN)	x	x	x				NM	

=== F56 ===
The F56 event took place on 10 September. The event incorporates athletes from classification F55 in addition to F56.

Rank	Athlete	1	2	3	4	5	6	Best	Notes
1st place, gold medalist(s)	Diāna Dadzīte (LAT)	22.25	23.08	23.26	23.19	21.77	21.78	23.26	WR
2nd place, silver medalist(s)	Martina Willing (GER)	21.80	x	22.22	21.42	x	x	22.22	
3rd place, bronze medalist(s)	Nadia Medjmedj (ALG)	19.45	20.24	x	x	18.36	19.63	20.24	
4	Hashemiyeh Motaghian (IRI)	18.99	19.83	18.74	x	x	19.81	19.83	
5	Daniela Todorova (BUL)	18.95	18.49	19.06	18.73	19.54	19.02	19.54	PB
6	Raíssa Rocha Machado (BRA)	17.38	x	18.34	x	18.57	x	18.57	
7	Angela Madsen (USA)	17.21	x	x	15.24	16.84	x	17.21	
8	Érica Castaño (COL)	15.85	16.40	15.00	15.07	x	x	16.40	
9	Dong Feixia (CHN)	13.76	14.33	14.25	–	–	–	14.33	
10	Milka Milinković (CRO)	13.70	13.92	13.95	–	–	–	13.95	
11	Iveth Valdes Romero (PAN)	13.27	11.76	13.57	–	–	–	13.57	
12	Kororoumou Coulibaly (MLI)	x	x	12.77	–	–	–	12.77	
