= Hollie Arnold =

British athlete (born 1994)

Hollie Arnold MBE
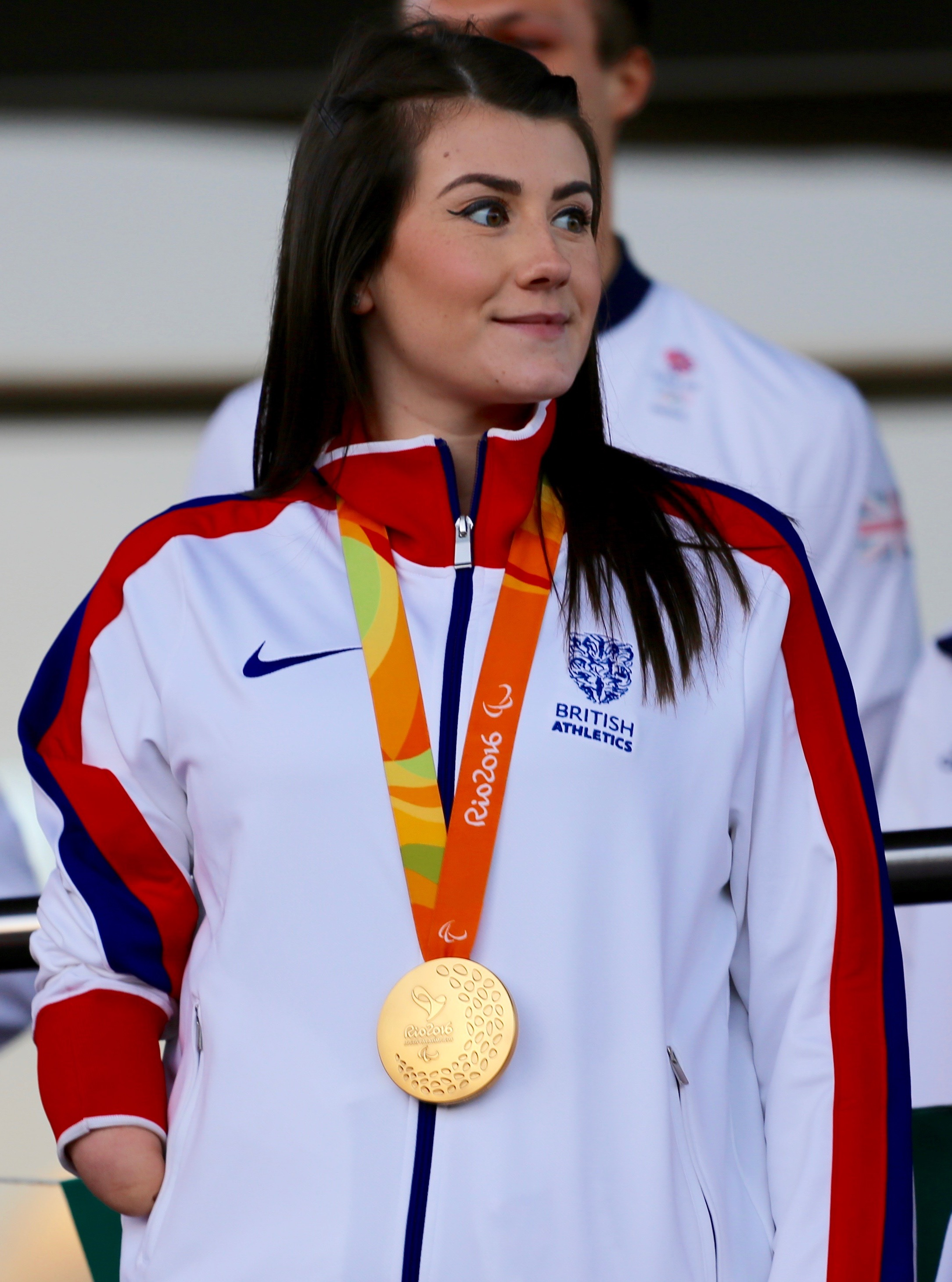
- Hollie Arnold with her 2016 Paralympic gold medal

Personal information
- Born: Hollie Beth Arnold; 26 June 1994 (age 32) Holton-le-Clay, Lincolnshire, England

Sport
- Country: Great Britain; Wales
- Sport: Para-athletics
- Disability class: F46
- Event: Javelin
- Club: Blackheath and Bromley AC
- Coached by: Scott Knighton

Achievements and titles
- Paralympic finals: 2008, 2012, 2016, 2020
- Highest world ranking: 1st
- Personal best: Javelin 44.73m
Medal record
Women's para-athletics
Representing Great Britain
Paralympic Games
Gold medal – first place	2016 Rio	Javelin throw – F46
Bronze medal – third place	2020 Tokyo	Javelin throw – F46
Bronze medal – third place	2024 Paris	Javelin throw – F46
World Championships
Gold medal – first place	2013 Lyon	Javelin throw – F46
Gold medal – first place	2015 Doha	Javelin throw – F46
Gold medal – first place	2017 London	Javelin throw – F46
Gold medal – first place	2019 Dubai	Javelin throw – F46
Gold medal – first place	2023 Paris	Javelin throw – F46
Gold medal – first place	2024 Kobe	Javelin throw – F46
Bronze medal – third place	2011 Christchurch	Javelin throw – F46
Bronze medal – third place	2025 New Delhi	Javelin throw – F46
European Championships
Gold medal – first place	2018 Berlin	Javelin throw – F46
Silver medal – second place	2012 Stadskanaal	Javelin throw – F46
Representing Wales
Commonwealth Games
Gold medal – first place	2018 Gold Coast	Javelin throw – F46

Hollie Beth Arnold (born 26 June 1994) is a British parasport athlete competing in category F46 javelin. Although born in Grimsby, she now lives and trains in Loughborough. She represents Wales in the Commonwealth Games.

Arnold was the youngest ever field athlete to ever compete in the Paralympics, at the age of 14 at the 2008 Summer Paralympics in Beijing, under the guidance of Olympic Javelin Thrower Shelley Holroyd, throwing a personal best. She also threw a personal best in 2012 Summer Paralympics in London. She took the gold medal in the F46 javelin in the 2016 Rio Paralympics, also throwing a new world record at the same time. In 2021, at the delayed 2020 Tokyo Paralympics, she took the bronze medal in the same event.

In 2018, she became the first ever Para Javelin thrower in history to hold all four major titles in the same Paralympic 4-year cycle: Rio Paralympics and world record 2016, London World Championships and world record 2017, Berlin European Championships and course record 2018 and Gold Coast Commonwealth Games and world record 2018. In 2019 Arnold lost her World Record to New Zealand F46 Para Javelin Thrower Holly Robinson with the first 45m+ throw in history. She also holds four consecutive world titles: 2013 Lyon, 2015 Doha, 2017 London, and 2019 Dubai.

== Personal life ==
Arnold was born in Lincolnshire in 1994, growing up in Holton-le-Clay. She was born without her right forearm. When attending a Star Track Athletics course during her Summer holidays she discovered an ability at the javelin. She joined Cleethorpes Athletic Club and began her career under the watchful eye of Olympic Javelin Thrower, Shelley Holroyd. She later moved to Hengoed in Wales to be near her former athletics coach. In 2017, she relocated to train with her present coach at Loughborough University.

In November 2020, Arnold took part in the twentieth series of I'm a Celebrity...Get Me Out of Here! where she was the first contestant voted off the show.

Arnold is an ambassador for two charities: Caudwell Children and St. Andrews Hospice, in Grimsby where she was born.

== Athletics career ==
Her first disability sports event was at the age of 11, winning seven gold medals across several events. In 2008, at the age of 14, she was selected to represent Great Britain at the Summer Paralympic Games in Beijing, finishing 11th in the women's F42–46 javelin. She was the youngest member of the 2008 Great Britain team. The next year she won her first significant medals when she competed in the 2009 IWAS World Junior Championships in Switzerland, winning silver in the F46 discus and bronze in the F46 javelin. 2009 was the last year Arnold competed at championships in discus, concentrating fully on the javelin.

The following year she improved on her javelin medal when she took silver at the 2010 IWAS World Junior Championship and then took gold at the 2011 Championship which was held in Dubai. The year 2011 saw Arnold step up to the senior level representing Britain at the IPC Athletics World Championships in New Zealand; she finished third in the F46 javelin, taking the bronze medal. In 2012, she took the silver medal at the IPC Championships. Her personal best at F46 javelin was recorded at 35.88m in June 2012 at the Welsh Championships in Cardiff, ranking her as the world number two in her event going into the 2012 Paralympics. Arnold's personal best was increased at the 2012 Summer Paralympics in London with a throw of 36.27m. On 22 July 2013, Arnold competed in the IPC Athletics World Championships in Lyon. She won gold with a winning throw of 37.45m, furthering her personal best.

In 2014, Arnold was preparing for the buildup to the IPC Athletics European Championships in Swansea, hoping to improve on the silver medal she won in Stadskanaal two years prior. With only a few weeks to the event, Arnold was informed that due to a lack of competitors her F46 event had been removed. Her next chance for a major international medal came at the 2015 IPC Athletics World Championships in Doha, where she threw a championship record distance of 40.53 to retain her gold medal.

In September 2016, Arnold won the gold medal at the 2016 Summer Paralympics in Rio de Janeiro with a world record throw of 43.01 metres.

She was appointed Member of the Order of the British Empire (MBE) in the 2017 New Year Honours for services to field athletics.

In April 2018, Arnold won the gold medal with a world record throw of 44.43 metres at the 2018 Commonwealth Games in Gold Coast, Australia, where she represented Wales.

In June 2021 she was among the first dozen athletes chosen to represent the UK at the postponed 2020 Paralympics in Tokyo.

At the 2023 World Para Athletics Championships, Hollie won gold in the F46 Javelin Throw.

At the 2024 World Para Athletics Championships, Hollie won her sixth world title in the F46 Javelin throw, ahead of Saška Sokolov and Noëlle Roorda.

At the 2024 Summer Paralympics, held in Paris, France, Hollie won the bronze medal in the F46 Javelin Throw.
