= 2021 World Para Athletics European Championships – Women's javelin throw =

The women's javelin throw events were held at the 2021 World Para Athletics European Championships in Bydgoszcz, Poland.

== Medalists ==
| Event | Gold | | Silver | | Bronze | |
|---|---|---|---|---|---|---|
| F13 | Anna Kulinich-Sorokina (RUS) | 37.95 | Lizaveta Piatrenka (BLR) | 37.33 ER | Natalija Eder (AUT) | 37.06 SB |
| F34 | Marjaana Heikkinen (FIN) | 17.85 | Frances Herrmann (GER) | 17.16 | Lucyna Kornobys (POL) | 16.12 |
| F46 | Noëlle Roorda (NED) | 39.72 PB | Saška Sokolov (SRB) | 36.78 PB | Katarzyna Piekart (POL) | 34.89 |
| F54 | Mariia Bogacheva (RUS) | 14.86 CR | Yuliya Nezhura (BLR) | 12.49 | Maja Rajkovic (MNE) | 12.33 SB |
| F56 | Martina Willing (GER) | 20.00 | Miroslava Obrova (CZE) | 15.09 | Ivana Petrovic (SRB) | 15.00 SB |
WR world record | ER European record | CR championship record | NR national record | WL world leading | EL European leading | PB personal best | SB seasonal best

== See also ==
- List of IPC world records in athletics
