= Athletics at the 2024 Summer Paralympics – Women's javelin throw F56 =

Women's Javelin Throw F56 at the XVII Paralympic Games
- Venue: Stade de France, Paris
- Date: 3 September 2024
- Competitors: 16 from 14 nations

Medalists
1st place, gold medalist(s)		Diāna Krumina	Latvia
2nd place, silver medalist(s)		Raíssa Rocha Machado	Brazil
3rd place, bronze medalist(s)		Lin Sitong	China

The Athletics at the 2024 Summer Paralympics – Women's javelin throw F56 event at the 2024 Summer Paralympics in Paris, took place on 3 September 2024.

== Classification ==
The event is open to F55 and F56 athletes. These athletes are seated when throwing, they have normal arm muscle power with full or nearly full trunk movement. F55 athletes may have flickers of hip flexor, while F56 may use hip flexor

== Records ==
Prior to the competition, the existing records were as follows:

F55 Records

World Record	Diāna Krumina (LAT)	27.07m	(United Kingdom) London	17 July 2017
Paralympic Record	Diāna Krumina (LAT)	24.22m	(Japan) Tokyo	31 August 2021

F56 Records

World Record	Raíssa Rocha Machado (BRA)	24.80m	(Brazil) São Paulo	13 March 2022
Paralympic Record	Hashemiyeh Motaghian Moavi (IRI)	24.50m	(Japan) Tokyo	31 August 2021

== Results ==
=== Qualification ===
The qualifying round in this classification took place on 2 September 2024: The 4 best performers (Q) advance to the final.

Rank	Athlete	Nationality	Class	1	2	3	Best	Notes
1	Maria Guadalupe Navarro Hernandez	Mexico	F55	x	17.10	16.71	17.10	Q
2	Natalya Semyanova	Uzbekistan	F55	17.00	16.86	x	17.00	Q
3	Miroslava Obrova	Czech Republic	F56	15.81	15.20	16.38	16.38	Q
4	Érica Castaño	Colombia	F55	15.98	x	16.12	16.12	Q SB
5	Dong Feixia	China	F55	14.98	15.93	15.64	15.93	SB
6	Korotoumou Coulibaly	Mali	F55	10.65	12.01	12.66	12.66	
	Mireille Nganga	Republic of the Congo	F56	x	x	x	NM	YC R6.16.1
	Iveth del Rosario Valdes Romero	Panama	F55				DNS	

=== Final ===
The final in this classification took place on 3 September 2024:

Rank	Athlete	Nationality	Class	1	2	3	4	5	6	Best	Notes
1st place, gold medalist(s)	Diāna Krumina	Latvia	F55	24.99	23.67	23.99	x	23.09	24.09	24.99	PR
2nd place, silver medalist(s)	Raíssa Rocha Machado	Brazil	F56	23.51	x	21.76	23.99	21.96	23.07	23.51	
3rd place, bronze medalist(s)	Lin Sitong	China	F55	x	22.35	x	21.03	21.53	20.39	22.35	
4	Soultana Keramyda	Greece	F56	21.70	21.48	21.33	x	x	21.96	21.96	YC R6.16.1
5	Hashemiyeh Motaghian Moavi	Iran	F56	18.78	21.16	21.51	20.06	20.61	21.69	21.69	
6	Martina Willing	Germany	F56	18.50	17.77	18.01	18.96	18.10	18.09	18.96	
7	Nadia Medjmedj	Algeria	F56	x	17.51	17.49	x	17.80	17.47	17.80	
8	Maria Guadalupe Navarro Hernandez	Mexico	F55	16.71	16.76	17.36	x	16.47	17.29	17.36	PB
9	Natalya Semyanova	Uzbekistan	F55	16.96	16.06	x	16.46	x	16.77	16.96	
10	Yessica de la Luz Jimenez Peralta	Mexico	F56	15.31	15.59	16.08	16.03	16.25	15.82	16.25	
11	Miroslava Obrova	Czech Republic	F56	14.97	14.98	15.34	15.77	15.63	15.28	15.77	YC R6.16.1
12	Érica Castaño	Colombia	F55	14.24	14.97	x	x	15.47	13.98	15.47	

Notes: YC=Yellow card for - "Noncompliance of equipment – racing chairs, running frames, throwing frames, prosthetic devices, helmets, tethers and eye masks/ opaque glasses"
