= 2017 World Para Athletics Championships – Women's javelin throw =

The women's javelin throw at the 2017 World Para Athletics Championships was held at the Olympic Stadium in London from 14 to 23 July.

== Medalists ==
Event	Gold		Silver		Bronze	
F11	Zhong Huimin; China	26.05 CR	Izabela Campos; Brazil	24.90	Ness Murby; Canada	23.69 PB
F13	Zhao Yuping; China	42.72 CR	Nozimakhon Kayumova; Uzbekistan	41.25 CR	Natalija Eder; Austria	38.37 SB
F34	Zou Lijuan; China	20.67 SB	Marjaana Heikkinen; Finland	18.71	Lucyna Kornobys; Poland	15.63
F37	Mi Na; China	26.22	Rae Anderson; Australia	24.98	—	
F46	Hollie Arnold; Great Britain	43.02 WR	Holly Robinson; New Zealand	42.41 AR	Surang Khamsuk; Thailand	29.86 SB
F54	Yang Liwan; China	17.79 SB	Hania Aidi; Tunisia	17.71	Ntombizanele Situ; South Africa	17.02
F56	Diana Dadzite; Latvia	27.07 WR	Hashemiyeh Motaghian; Iran	20.66 AR	Martina Willing; Germany	20.57
WR world record | AR area record | CR championship record | GR games record | NR national record | OR Olympic record | PB personal best | SB season best | WL world leading (in a given season)

Events listed in pink were contested but no medals were awarded.

== Detailed results ==
=== F11 ===
Rank	Athlete	1	2	3	4	5	6	Best	Notes
1st place, gold medalist(s)	(China) Zhong Huimin	26.05	22.96	25.42	22.19	23.55	22.35	26.05	CR
2nd place, silver medalist(s)	(Brazil) Izabela Campos	X	X	X	X	X	24.90	24.90	
3rd place, bronze medalist(s)	(Canada) Ness Murby	23.69	22.01	23.28	23.58	23.58	22.57	23.69	PB
4	(China) Zhang Liangmin	13.36	14.89	13.79	14.56	15.69	14.17	15.69	
5	(China) Zhou Guohua	X	9.89	X	11.47	X	13.34	13.34	PB
—	(Greece) Paraskevi Kantza	X	X	X	X	X	X	—	NM

=== F13 ===
Rank	Athlete	1	2	3	4	5	6	Best	Notes
1st place, gold medalist(s)	(China) Zhao Yuping	39.92	32.91	40.43	38.16	42.72	37.13	42.72	CR
2nd place, silver medalist(s)	(Uzbekistan) Nozimakhon Kayumova	37.07	37.48	X	39.65	41.25	41.18	41.25	
3rd place, bronze medalist(s)	(Austria) Natalija Eder	38.37	37.89	32.84	35.99	33.88	37.30	38.37	SB
4	(Chinese Taipei) Liu Ya-ting	30.82	34.30	31.64	30.30	31.48	32.69	34.30	SB
5	(Croatia) Marija Vidacek	X	X	27.33	29.25	X	X	29.25	SB
6	(Kazakhstan) Zhaniya Ayaubayeva	X	X	12.75	14.87	X	13.85	14.87	

=== F34 ===
Rank	Athlete	1	2	3	4	5	6	Best	Notes
1st place, gold medalist(s)	(China) Zou Lijuan	19.38	19.14	20.67	18.95	17.17	19.38	20.67	SB
2nd place, silver medalist(s)	(Finland) Marjaana Heikkinen	18.12	18.69	18.71	X	X	18.64	18.71	
3rd place, bronze medalist(s)	(Poland) Lucyna Kornobys	X	15.15	14.49	15.63	X	14.62	15.63	
4	(Morocco) Saida Amoudi	12.96	X	13.01	12.70	13.01	12.97	13.01	

=== F37 ===
Rank	Athlete	1	2	3	4	5	6	Best	Notes
1	(China) Mi Na	X	25.49	X	26.22	X	X	26.22	
2	(Australia) Rae Anderson	23.67	24.42	23.67	20.71	22.49	24.98	24.98	

=== F46 ===
Rank	Athlete	1	2	3	4	5	6	Best	Notes
1st place, gold medalist(s)	Hollie Arnold (GBR)	41.38	42.13	41.90	43.02	42.89	x	43.02	WR
2nd place, silver medalist(s)	Holly Robinson (NZL)	39.91	38.92	38.47	41.83	40.89	42.41	42.41	AR
3rd place, bronze medalist(s)	Surang Khamsuk (THA)	25.86	29.42	29.86	x	x	28.11	29.86	SB
4	Marlam Almatrooshi (UAE)	26.87	x	x	x	x	x	26.87	
5	Yukiko Kato (JPN)	x	x	x	x	x	26.48	26.48	

=== F54 ===
Rank	Athlete	1	2	3	4	5	6	Best	Notes
1st place, gold medalist(s)	(China) Yang Liwan	17.09	X	17.79	16.45	17.03	16.95	17.79	SB
2nd place, silver medalist(s)	(Tunisia) Hania Aidi	X	X	17.71	17.70	X	X	17.71	
3rd place, bronze medalist(s)	(South Africa) Ntombizanele Situ	17.02	X	X	16.49	16.93	15.92	17.02	
4	(Belarus) Yuliya Nezhura	12.32	X	X	10.44	X	11.26	12.32	PB
5	(Mexico) Maria Salas	X	10.78	X	10.44	10.47	X	10.78'	SB

=== F56 ===
Rank	Athlete	1	2	3	4	5	6	Best	Notes
1st place, gold medalist(s)	(Latvia) Diana Dadzite	X	26.22	27.07	X	X	X	27.07	WR
2nd place, silver medalist(s)	(Iran) Hashemiyeh Motaghian	20.23	19.62	20.66	18.66	20.50	19.72	20.66	AR
3rd place, bronze medalist(s)	(Germany) Martina Willing	X	X	X	20.17	X	20.57	20.57	
4	(Algeria) Nadia Medjmedj	20.05	20.52	20.45	19.14	19.01	X	20.52	
5	(Bulgaria) Daniela Todorova	X	18.38	X	X	18.28	18.65	18.65	
6	(Jamaica) Santana Shawana Campbell	X	18.15	17.89	17.24	18.15	17.28	18.15	AR
7	(Bahrain) Rooba Alomari	13.15	X	13.68	11.99	X	X	13.68	PB
8	(Kenya) Nelly Jeptoo Sile	X	12.69	13.13	12.62	13.41	X	13.41	

== See also ==
- List of IPC world records in athletics
