= 2024 World Para Athletics Championships – Women's javelin throw =

The women's javelin throw events at the 2024 World Para Athletics Championships were held in Kobe.

== Medalists ==
Event	Gold	Silver	Bronze
F13	Zhao Yuping; China	Natalija Eder; Austria	Lizaveta Dabravolskaya; Neutral Paralympic Athletes (NPA)
F34	Zou Lijuan; China	Zuo Caiyun; China	Fouzia El Kassioui; Morocco
F46	Hollie Arnold; Great Britain	Saška Sokolov; Serbia	Noëlle Roorda; Netherlands
F54	Nurkhon Kurbanova; Uzbekistan	Flora Ugwunwa; Nigeria	Elham Salehi; Iran
F56	Raíssa Rocha Machado; Brazil	Hashemiyeh Motaghian; Iran	Lin Sitong; China
