= Sheilla Wanyoyi =

Kenyan para athlete (born 1998)

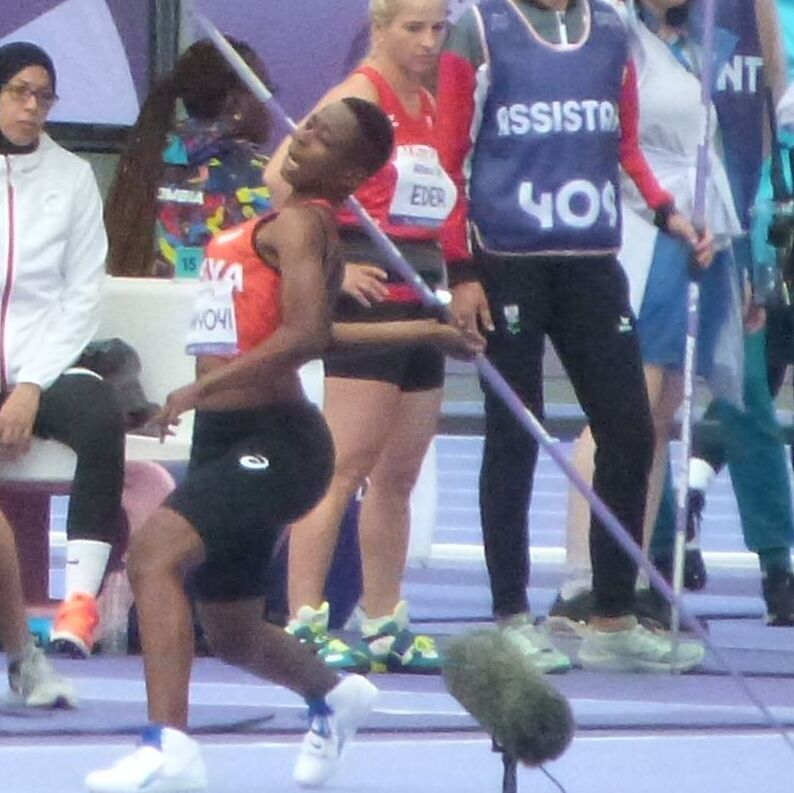
- Wanyoyi at the 2024 Summer Paralympics

Personal information
- Nationality: Kenyan
- Born: 6 January 1998 (age 28)

Sport
- Sport: Para-athletics
- Disability: Visual impairment
- Disability class: F13
- Event: javelin throw
Medal record
Women's para-athletics
Representing Kenya
World Championships
| Silver medal – second place | 2025 New Delhi | Javelin throw F13 |

Sheilla Wanyoyi (born 6 January 1998) is a visually impaired Kenyan para-athlete who specializes in javelin throw. She represented Kenya at the 2024 Summer Paralympics.

== Career ==
Wanyoyi represented Kenya at the 2024 Summer Paralympics and finished in ninth place in the javelin throw F13 event. She competed at the 2025 World Para Athletics Championships and won a silver medal in the javelin throw F13 event with an African record throw of 38.63 metres.
