= Zhao Yuping =

Chinese Paralympic athlete (born 1994)

Personal information
- Born: 1 January 1994 (age 32) Hebei, China

Sport
- Country: China
- Sport: Para-athletics
- Disability: Vision impairment
- Disability class: F12
- Event(s): Discus throw Javelin throw Shot put
Medal record
Women's para athletics
Representing China
Paralympic Games
Gold medal – first place	2024 Paris	Javelin throw F13
Silver medal – second place	2020 Tokyo	Javelin throw F13
Bronze medal – third place	2024 Paris	Shot put F12
World Championships
Gold medal – first place	2017 London	Javelin throw F13
Gold medal – first place	2019 Dubai	Javelin throw F13
Gold medal – first place	2023 Paris	Javelin throw F13
Gold medal – first place	2024 Kobe	Javelin throw F13
Gold medal – first place	2025 New Delhi	Javelin throw F13
Silver medal – second place	2015 Doha	Discus throw F12
Silver medal – second place	2024 Kobe	Shot put F12
Silver medal – second place	2025 New Delhi	Shot put F12
Bronze medal – third place	2015 Doha	Javelin throw F13
Bronze medal – third place	2023 Paris	Shot put F12
Asian Para Games
Gold medal – first place	2018 Jakarta	Discus throw F12
Gold medal – first place	2018 Jakarta	Javelin throw F12/13
Gold medal – first place	2022 Hangzhou	Javelin throw F12/13
Silver medal – second place	2022 Hangzhou	Shot put F11/12
Bronze medal – third place	2018 Jakarta	Shot put F11/12

Zhao Yuping (born 1 January 1994) is a visually impaired Chinese Paralympic athlete competing in F12/F13-classification events. She won the gold medal in the women's javelin throw F13 event at the 2024 Summer Paralympics in Paris, France. She also won the silver medal in her event at the 2020 Summer Paralympics in Tokyo, Japan. She is a four-time gold medalist in this event at the World Para Athletics Championships.

== Career ==
Zhao represented China at the 2016 Summer Paralympics in Rio de Janeiro, Brazil and she finished in 4th place in the women's javelin throw F13 event. At the 2017 World Para Athletics Championships held in London, United Kingdom, she won the gold medal in the women's javelin throw F13 event.

At the 2019 World Para Athletics Championships held in Dubai, United Arab Emirates, Zhao won the gold medal in the women's javelin throw F13 event and she set a new world record of 46.00m. She also competed in the women's shot put F12 event where she finished in 4th place.

Zhao again represented China at the 2020 Summer Paralympics in Tokyo, Japan and she won the silver medal in the women's javelin throw F13 event.

In 2023, she won the gold medal in the women's javelin throw F13 event at the World Para Athletics Championships held in Paris, France. She also won the bronze medal in the women's shot put F12 event.

She won the gold medal in the women's javelin throw F13 event at the 2024 Summer Paralympics in Paris, France.
