= Flora Ugwunwa =

Nigerian Paralympic athlete (born 1984)

Personal information
- Born: 26 June 1984 (age 42)

Sport
- Country: Nigeria
- Sport: Para-athletics
- Disability: Paraplegia
- Disability class: F54
- Events: Discus throw; Javelin throw
Medal record
Paralympic Games
Gold medal – first place	2016 Rio de Janeiro	Javelin throw F54
Gold medal – first place	2020 Tokyo	Javelin throw F54
Silver medal – second place	2024 Paris	Javelin throw F54
World Championships
Silver medal – second place	2019 Dubai	Javelin throw F54
Silver medal – second place	2024 Kobe	Javelin throw F54
African Games
Gold medal – first place	2015 Brazzaville	Discus throw F54/57
Silver medal – second place	2015 Brazzaville	Javelin throw F54/56

Flora Ugwunwa (born 26 June 1984) is a Nigerian Paralympic athlete competing in F54-classification events. She won the gold medal in the women's javelin throw F54 event at the 2016 Summer Paralympics held in Rio de Janeiro, Brazil. She won silver in this event at the 2024 Summer Paralympics in Paris, France.

== Career ==
Ugwunwa represented Nigeria at the 2016 Summer Paralympics held in Rio de Janeiro, Brazil and she won the gold medal in the women's javelin throw F54 event. She also set a new world record of 20.25m at this event.

Ugwunwa represented Nigeria at the 2020 Summer Paralympics in Tokyo, Japan after winning the silver medal in the women's javelin throw F54 event at the 2019 World Para Athletics Championships held in Dubai, United Arab Emirates. She also competed in the women's shot put F54 event where she finished in 6th place.
