= Nurkhon Kurbanova =

Uzbekistani Paralympic athlete (born 1994)

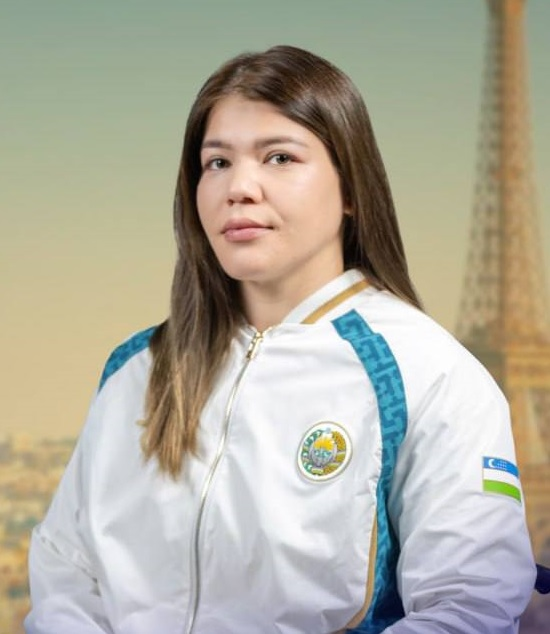

Personal information
- Nationality: Uzbekistani
- Born: 12 August 1994 (age 31) Namangan, Uzbekistan

Sport
- Sport: Paralympic athletics
- Disability class: F55
- Events: Discus throw; Javelin throw; Shot put
- Coached by: Sardor Abdukholikov; Yakhyo Yakubov
Medal record
Women's para-athletics
Representing Uzbekistan
Paralympic Games
| Gold medal – first place | 2024 Paris | Javelin throw F54 |
| Silver medal – second place | 2020 Tokyo | Javelin throw F54 |
| Bronze medal – third place | 2020 Tokyo | Shot put F54 |
| Bronze medal – third place | 2024 Paris | Shot put F54 |
World Championships
| Gold medal – first place | 2023 Paris | Javelin throw F54 |
| Gold medal – first place | 2024 Kobe | Javelin throw F54 |
| Bronze medal – third place | 2023 Paris | Shot put F54 |
| Bronze medal – third place | 2024 Kobe | Shot put F54 |
Asian Para Games
| Gold medal – first place | 2022 Hangzhou | Javelin throw F54 |

Nurkhon Kurbanova (born 12 August 1994) is an Uzbekistani Paralympic athlete specializing in throwing events. She represented Uzbekistan at the 2020 Summer Paralympics and 2024 Summer Paralympics.

== Career ==
Kurbanova made her international debut for Uzbekistan at the 2019 World Para Athletics Championships where she finished in fifth place in the women's shot put F54 event and sixth place in the women's javelin throw F54 event.

Kurbanova represented Uzbekistan in the women's shot put F54 event at the 2020 Summer Paralympics and won a bronze medal. She also won a silver medal in the women's javelin throw F54 event and placed 8th in the Shot put.

At the 2022 Asian Para Games Kurbanova won the Javelin Throw and a silver medal in the Shot Put. She also placed 4th in the Discus Throw.

At the 2023 World Para Athletics Championships, she won gold in the Javelin and bronze in the shot put, also placing 10th in the discus throw.

At the 2024 World Para Athletics Championships, she again won gold in the Javelin and bronze in the shot put.

She qualified to represent Uzbekistan at the 2024 Summer Paralympics, winning gold in the Javelin Throw with a world record of 21.12 metres, bronze in the shot put and placed 11th in the discus.
