= Nozimakhon Kayumova =

Uzbekistani Paralympic athlete (born 1992)

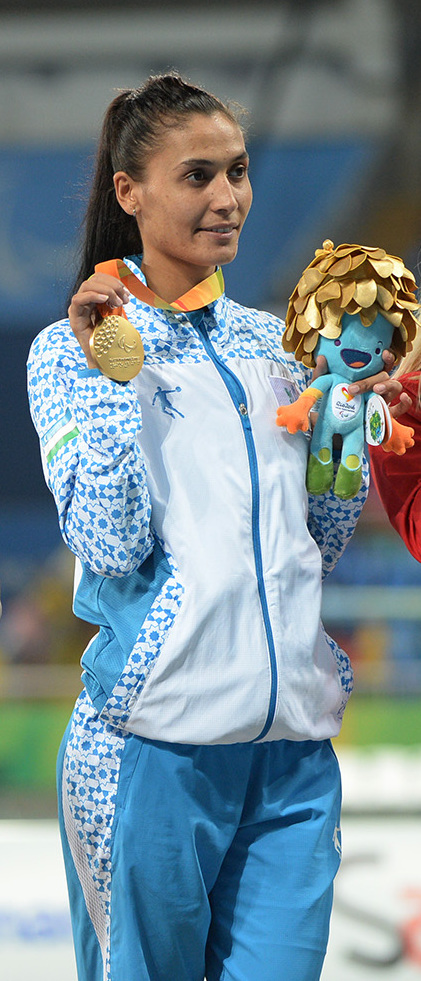
- Nozimakhon Kayumova (2016)

Personal information
- Born: 17 August 1992 (age 33)

Sport
- Country: Uzbekistan
- Sport: Para athletics
- Disability: Vision impairment
- Disability class: F13
- Event: Javelin throw
Medal record
Women's para athletics
Representing Uzbekistan
Paralympic Games
Gold medal – first place	2016 Rio de Janeiro	Javelin throw F13
Gold medal – first place	2020 Tokyo	Javelin throw F13
World Championships
Silver medal – second place	2017 London	Javelin throw F13
Silver medal – second place	2023 Paris	Javelin throw F13
Bronze medal – third place	2019 Dubai	Javelin throw F13
Asian Para Games
Silver medal – second place	2022 Hangzhou	Javelin throw F12/13

Nozimakhon Kayumova (born 17 August 1992) is a visually impaired Uzbekistani Paralympic athlete and she competes in F13-classification javelin throw events. She won the gold medal in the women's javelin throw F13 event at both the 2016 Summer Paralympics in Rio de Janeiro, Brazil and the 2020 Summer Paralympics in Tokyo, Japan.

== Career ==
Kayumova represented Uzbekistan at the 2016 Summer Paralympics in Rio de Janeiro, Brazil and she won the gold medal in the women's javelin throw F13 event with a throw of 44.58 metres. This was also a new F13 world record in this event.

At the 2017 World Para Athletics Championships held in London, United Kingdom, Kayumova won the silver medal in the women's javelin throw F13 event. She also set a new F13 championship record with a throw of 41.25 metres.

Kayumova qualified to represent Uzbekistan at the 2020 Summer Paralympics in Tokyo, Japan after winning the bronze medal in the women's javelin throw F13 event at the 2019 World Para Athletics Championships in Dubai, United Arab Emirates. She won the gold medal in the women's javelin throw F13 event at the 2020 Summer Paralympics held in Tokyo, Japan.

In 2023, she won the silver medal in the women's javelin throw F13 event at the World Para Athletics Championships held in Paris, France.

== Achievements ==
Year	Competition	Venue	Position	Event	Notes
2016	Summer Paralympics	Rio de Janeiro, Brazil	1st	Javelin throw	44.58 m
2017	World Championships	London, United Kingdom	2nd	Javelin throw	41.25 m
2019	World Championships	Dubai, United Arab Emirates	3rd	Javelin throw	38.86 m
2021	Summer Paralympics	Tokyo, Japan	1st	Javelin throw	42.59 m
2023	World Championships	Paris, France	2nd	Javelin throw	40.78 m
