= Ness Murby =

Canadian Paralympic athlete

Personal information
- Full name: Ness Ashby Murby
- Born: 4 October 1985 (age 40) Melbourne, Australia
- Height: 1.79 m (5 ft 10 in)

Sport
- Country: Canada
- Sport: Para-athletics
- Disability: Hyperferritinemia
- Disability class: F11
- Events: Discus throw; Javelin throw
Medal record
Para-athletics
Representing Canada
World Championships
| Silver medal – second place | 2015 Doha | Women's javelin throw F11 |
| Bronze medal – third place | 2017 London | Women's javelin throw F11 |
Parapan American Games
| Silver medal – second place | 2015 Toronto | Women's javelin throw F11 |
| Bronze medal – third place | 2015 Toronto | Women's discus throw F11 |

Ness Ashby Murby (born 4 October 1985) is a Canadian Paralympian (PLY) who competes in Para-Athletics discus throw and javelin throw.

== Career ==
Murby has competed in goalball, powerlifting and para-athletics, and has represented Australia, Japan and Canada. He competes in the F11 disability class. Representing Canada, Murby won a silver medal in javelin throw and a bronze medal in discus throw at the 2015 Parapan American Games. Competing in javelin throw, he won a silver medal at the 2015 IPC Athletics World Championships and a bronze medal at the 2017 World Para Athletics Championships, coming sixth in discus throw at the intervening 2016 Summer Paralympics and at the 2019 World Para Athletics Championships. Murby participated in the second season of the AMI documentary series Mind Set Go in 2019. In November 2020, he came out as genderqueer and transmasculine.

In 2023, Murby was the subject of Ness Murby: Transcending, a six-part television documentary series on AMI-tv.

== Personal life ==
Murby was born on 4 October 1985 in Melbourne, Australia. He was born with limited eyesight, which deteriorated while he was a teenager, and is now blind. Murby lives in Vancouver with his wife Eva Fejes, who met him in Japan.
