= Zou Lijuan =

Chinese Paralympic athlete

Personal information
- Nationality: China
- Born: 6 August 1994 (age 31) Xuzhou, China

Sport
- Sport: Para-athletics
- Event(s): Javelin throw Shot put
Medal record
Women's para athletics
Representing China
Paralympic Games
Gold medal – first place	2016 Rio de Janeiro	Javelin throw F34
Gold medal – first place	2016 Rio de Janeiro	Shot put F34
Gold medal – first place	2020 Tokyo	Javelin throw F34
Gold medal – first place	2020 Tokyo	Shot put F34
Gold medal – first place	2024 Paris	Javelin throw F34
Gold medal – first place	2024 Paris	Shot put F34
World Championships
Gold medal – first place	2015 Doha	Shot put F34
Gold medal – first place	2015 Doha	Javelin throw F34
Gold medal – first place	2017 London	Shot put F34
Gold medal – first place	2017 London	Javelin throw F34
Gold medal – first place	2019 Dubai	Shot put F34
Gold medal – first place	2019 Dubai	Javelin throw F34
Gold medal – first place	2023 Paris	Shot put F34
Gold medal – first place	2024 Kobe	Shot put F34
Gold medal – first place	2024 Kobe	Javelin throw F34
Gold medal – first place	2025 New Delhi	Shot put F34
Gold medal – first place	2025 New Delhi	Javelin throw F34
Asian Para Games
Gold medal – first place	2014 Incheon	Shot put F34
Gold medal – first place	2014 Incheon	Javelin throw F33/34
Gold medal – first place	2018 Jakarta	Shot put F34
Gold medal – first place	2018 Jakarta	Javelin throw F34
Gold medal – first place	2022 Hangzhou	Shot put F34
Gold medal – first place	2022 Hangzhou	Javelin throw F34

Zou Lijuan (born 6 August 1994) is a Chinese track and field athlete who competes in javelin and shot put.

== Career ==
She won a gold medal at the Women's Javelin Throw F34 event at the 2016 Summer Paralympics with a world record of 21.86. She also won a gold medal at the Women's Shot Put F34 event. At the 2020 Summer Paralympics she won a gold medal in Women's Javelin Throw F34 with a world record of 22.28. She also won a gold medal at the Women's Shot Put F34 event with a world record of 9.19. She won seven gold medals at the World Para Athletics Championships.
