= Mariia Shpatkivska =

Ukrainian Paralympic athlete (born 2000)

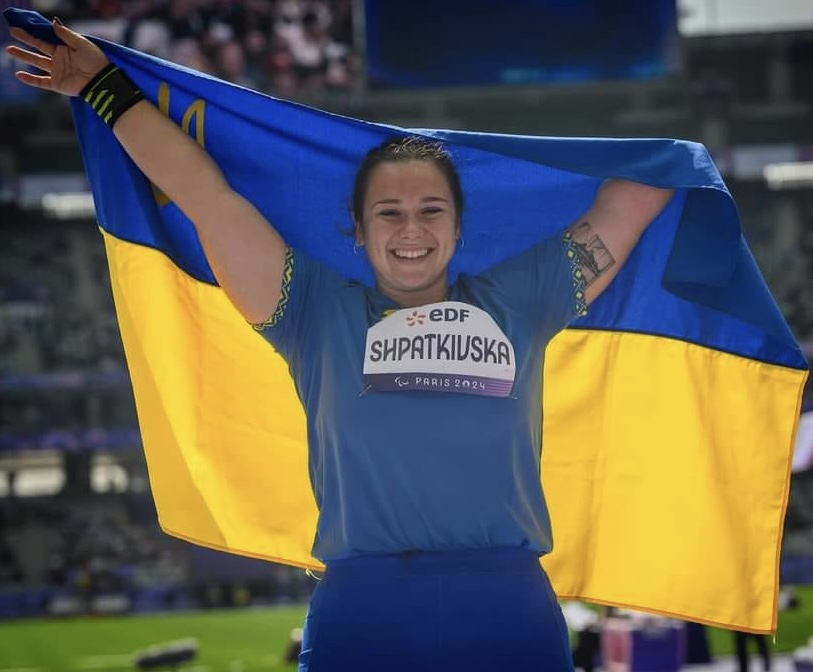
- Shpatkivska at the 2024 Summer Paralympics

Personal information
- Nationality: Ukrainian
- Born: 8 June 2000 (age 26) Koziatyn, Ukraine

Sport
- Sport: Para-athletics
- Disability class: F46
- Event: shot put
Medal record
Women's para-athletics
Representing Ukraine
Silver medal – second place	2024 Paris	Shot put F46

Mariia Shpatkivska (born 8 June 2000) is a Ukrainian para-athlete specializing in shot put. She represented Ukraine at the 2024 Summer Paralympics.

== Career ==
Shpatkivska represented Ukraine at the 2024 Summer Paralympics and won a silver medal in the shot put F46 event.
