= Raíssa Rocha Machado =

Brazilian Paralympic athlete (born 1996)

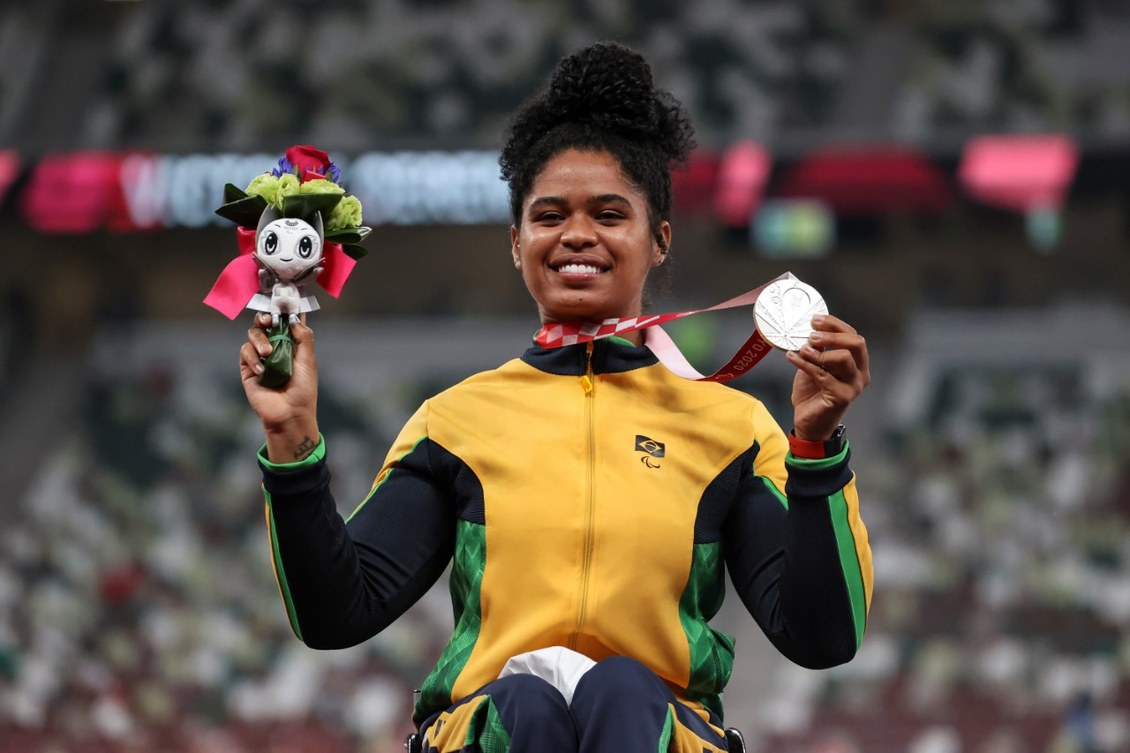
- Machado at Tokyo 2020 Paralympics

Personal information
- Nickname: Boto
- Born: 17 May 1996 (age 30) Ibipeba, Bahia, Brazil
- Home town: Uberaba, Brazil
- Height: 1.64 m (5 ft 5 in)

Sport
- Country: Brazil
- Sport: Paralympic athletics
- Disability class: F56
- Event: Javelin throw
Medal record
Women's para athletics
Representing Brazil
Paralympic Games
Silver medal – second place	2020 Tokyo	Javelin throw F56
Silver medal – second place	2024 Paris	Javelin throw F56
World Championships
Gold medal – first place	2024 Kobe	Javelin throw F56
Silver medal – second place	2015 Doha	Javelin throw F56
Silver medal – second place	2023 Paris	Javelin throw F56
Silver medal – second place	2025 New Delhi	Javelin throw F56
Bronze medal – third place	2019 Dubai	Javelin throw F56
Parapan American Games
Gold medal – first place	2019 Lima	Javelin throw F56
Bronze medal – third place	2015 Toronto	Javelin throw F56

Raíssa Rocha Machado (Note: This name uses Portuguese naming customs: the first or maternal family name is Rocha and the second or paternal family name is Machado.) (born 17 May 1996) is a Brazilian Paralympic javelin thrower.

== Career ==
Machado competed at the 2015 Parapan American Games, where she won a bronze medal. At the 2019 Parapan American Games, she won a gold medal.

Machado finished sixth at the 2016 Summer Paralympics. She qualified for the 2020 Summer Paralympics.
