= Dayna Crees =

Australian Paralympic athlete

Personal information
- Nationality: Australian
- Born: 19 March 2002 (age 24)

Sport
- Country: Australia
- Sport: Athletics
- Disability: Hereditary Spastic Paraplegia
- Club: Casey Cardinia Athletics Club
Medal record
Women's para-athletics
Representing Australia
Paralympic Games
Bronze medal – third place	2024 Paris	Javelin throw F34
World Championships
Bronze medal – third place	2025 New Delhi	Javelin throw F34

Dayna Crees (born 19 March 2002) is an Australian Paralympic athletics competitor. She competed at the 2024 Paris Paralympics, where she won a bronze medal

== Personal ==
Crees was born on 19 March 2002. Since birth she has hereditary spastic paraplegia. She attended St Francis Xavier College, Beaconsfield. In 2023, she undertaking a Certificate III in Early Childhood Education and Care at Chisholm TAFE.

== Athletics ==
She is classified as a F34 athlete. At the age oft twelve, her physiotherapist recommended she take up athletics. At the 2023 World Para Athletics Championships, she finished sixth in Women's Shot Put F34 and fourth in the Women's Javelin F34. She broke Australian and Oceania records in the javelin event.

At the 2024 Paris Paralympics, she won the bronze medal in the Women's Javelin throw F34 and finished ninth in the Women's Shot put F34.

In 2024, she is a Victorian Institute of Sport scholarship athlete. She is coached by Gordon Talbot.
