= Zuo Caiyun =

Chinese Paralympic athlete (born 1996)

Personal information
- Born: 7 February 1996 (age 30) Guangdong, China

Sport
- Sport: Para-athletics
- Disability class: F34
- Event: javelin throw
Medal record
Para-athletics
Representing China
Paralympic Games
Silver medal – second place	2024 Paris	Javelin throw F34
World Championships
Silver medal – second place	2024 Kobe	Javelin throw F34
Silver medal – second place	2025 New Delhi	Javelin throw F34
Asian Para Games
Silver medal – second place	2022 Hangzhou	Javelin throw F34

Zuo Caiyun (Simplified Chinese: 左彩云)(born 7 February 1996) is a Chinese para-athlete specializing in javelin throw. She represented China at the 2024 Summer Paralympics.

== Career ==
She represented China at the 2024 World Para Athletics Championships and won a silver medal in the javelin throw F34. As a result, she qualified for the 2024 Summer Paralympics. At the 2024 Summer Paralympics she won a silver medal in the javelin throw F34 event.
