= Shahinakhon Yigitalieva =

Uzbekistani Paralympic athlete (born 2008)

Personal information
- Nationality: Uzbekistani
- Born: 19 October 2008 (age 17)

Sport
- Country: Uzbekistan
- Sport: Para-athletics
- Disability class: F46
- Event: javelin throw
Medal record
Women's para-athletics
Representing Uzbekistan
Paralympic Games
Silver medal – second place	2024 Paris	Javelin throw F46
World Championships
Silver medal – second place	2025 New Delhi	Javelin throw F46
Asian Para Games
Gold medal – first place	2022 Hangzhou	Javelin throw F46

Shahinakhon Yigitalieva (born 19 October 2008) is an Uzbekistani para-athlete specializing in javelin throw. She represented Uzbekistan at the 2024 Summer Paralympics.

== Career ==
Yigitalieva represented Uzbekistan at the 2024 Summer Paralympics and won a silver medal in the javelin throw F46 event. She competed at the 2025 World Para Athletics Championships and won a silver medal in the javelin throw F46 event.
