= Lupita Navarro =

Mexican para-athlete (born 2006)

Personal information
- Full name: María Guadalupe Navarro Hernández
- Nationality: Mexican
- Born: 10 December 2006 (age 19) Jalisco, Mexico

Sport
- Sport: Para-athletics
- Disability class: F55
- Events: discus throw javelin throw
Medal record
Women's para-athletics
Representing Mexico
World Championships
Bronze medal – third place	2025 New Delhi	Discus throw F55

María Guadalupe Navarro Hernández (born 10 December 2006), known as Lupita Navarro, is a Mexican para-athlete specializing in discus throw and javelin throw. She represented Mexico at the 2024 Summer Paralympics.

== Career ==
In July 2025, Navarro was selected to represent Mexico at the 2024 Summer Paralympics. She finished in seventh place in the discus throw F55 event with a throw of 21.66 metres. She also competed in the javelin throw F56 event. During the qualification round she ranked first with a throw of 17.10 metres. She finished the finals in eighth place with a personal best throw of 17.36 metres.

She competed at the 2025 World Para Athletics Championships and won a bronze medal in the discus throw F55 event.
