= Diāna Krumina =

Paralympic athlete

Diana Krumina
Personal information
- Nationality: Latvian
- Born: Diana Dadzite; 4 February 1986 (age 40) Riga, Latvian SSR, Soviet Union

Sport
- Sport: Paralympic athletics
- Disability class: F55, F56
- Events: Javelin throw discus throw shot put
Medal record
Representing Latvia
Paralympic Games
Gold medal – first place	2016 Rio de Janeiro	Javelin throw F55/56
Gold medal – first place	2024 Paris	Javelin throw F56
Silver medal – second place	2020 Tokyo	Discus throw F55
Bronze medal – third place	2016 Rio de Janeiro	Discus throw F55
Bronze medal – third place	2020 Tokyo	Javelin throw F56
World Championships
Gold medal – first place	2017 London	Shot put F55
Gold medal – first place	2017 London	Discus throw F55
Gold medal – first place	2017 London	Javelin throw F56
Gold medal – first place	2019 Dubai	Javelin throw F56
Gold medal – first place	2023 Paris	Javelin throw F56
Gold medal – first place	2025 New Delhi	Javelin throw F56
Gold medal – first place	2025 New Delhi	Discus throw F55
Bronze medal – third place	2019 Dubai	Discus throw F55
Bronze medal – third place	2023 Paris	Discus throw F55

Diāna Krumina née Dadzīte (born 4 February 1986) is a Latvian Paralympic track and field athlete competing in shot put, discus and javelin throw, and is twice Paralympic javelin champion.

== Career ==
Krumina first started competing in 2014 for Latvia. The following year she went to her first world championship. She competed in Shot put, Javelin and Discus throw, placing 4th, 7th and 11th respectively.

Krumina was selected to compete at 2016 Summer Paralympics, where she won gold in the F56 Javelin with a throw of 23.26 metres which was also a new world record. She also had the honour of being Latvia’s flag bearer for the opening ceremony.

At the 2017 World Para Athletics Championships, she won gold in Javelin, Shot put and Discus throw in her class. She was labelled the most successful field eventer at the championship, due to winning all three events in one championship.

She next competed at the 2019 Worlds, claiming a bronze in the Discus throw and gold in the Javelin.

At the postponed, 2020 Summer Paralympics, she won a silver in the discus and bronze in the Javelin throw.

At the 2023 World Para Athletics Championships, Krumina won the Javelin event with a throw of 25.81 metres. She also placed 3rd in the shot put.

Krumina was selected to compete at the 2024 Summer Paralympics, where she placed 4th in the Discus Throw.
