= Yang Liwan =

Chinese Paralympic athlete

Personal information
- Nationality: Chinese
- Born: 18 January 1978 (age 48) Shishi, Fujian, China
- Height: 183 cm (72 in)

Sport
- Country: China
- Sport: Athletics (track)
- Disability: Limb deficiency
- Disability class: T54
- Club: Fujian Province
- Coached by: Du Huaizhen
Medal record
Track and field
Representing China
Paralympic Games
Gold medal – first place	2012 London	Javelin – T54/55/56
Gold medal – first place	2012 London	Shot put – F54–56
Gold medal – first place	2016 Rio de Janeiro	Shot put F54
Bronze medal – third place	2020 Tokyo	Javelin throw F54
World Championships
Gold medal – first place	2015 Doha	Shot put – F54
Gold medal – first place	2017 London	Javelin throw – F54
Silver medal – second place	2013 Lyon	Shot put – F54
Silver medal – second place	2013 Lyon	Javelin Throw F54/55/56
Silver medal – second place	2015 Doha	Javelin – F54
Bronze medal – third place	2017 London	Discus throw – F55
Asian Para Games
Gold medal – first place	2014 Incheon	Discus throw – F52/53/54
Gold medal – first place	2014 Incheon	Javelin throw – F53/54
Gold medal – first place	2014 Incheon	Shot put – F53/54

Yang Liwan (born 18 January 1978) is a Paralympian athlete from China competing mainly in category F54 throwing events.

== Athletic career ==
Yang made her first appearance at a Summer Paralympics in the 2008 Games in Beijing. She entered both the shot put and javelin throw, finishing seventh and eighth respectively. Four years later she appeared at the 2012 Paralympics in London, winning gold in both the javelin and the shot put.

As well as her Paralympic success, Yang has also found success at World Championship level. At the 2015 IPC Athletics World Championships in Doha she won gold in the shot put along with a silver in the javelin.

== Personal history ==
Yang was born in Shishi, China in 1978. In 1996 she was struck by a falling object resulting in paraplegia.
