= Rae Anderson (athlete) =

Australian Paralympic athlete (born 1997)

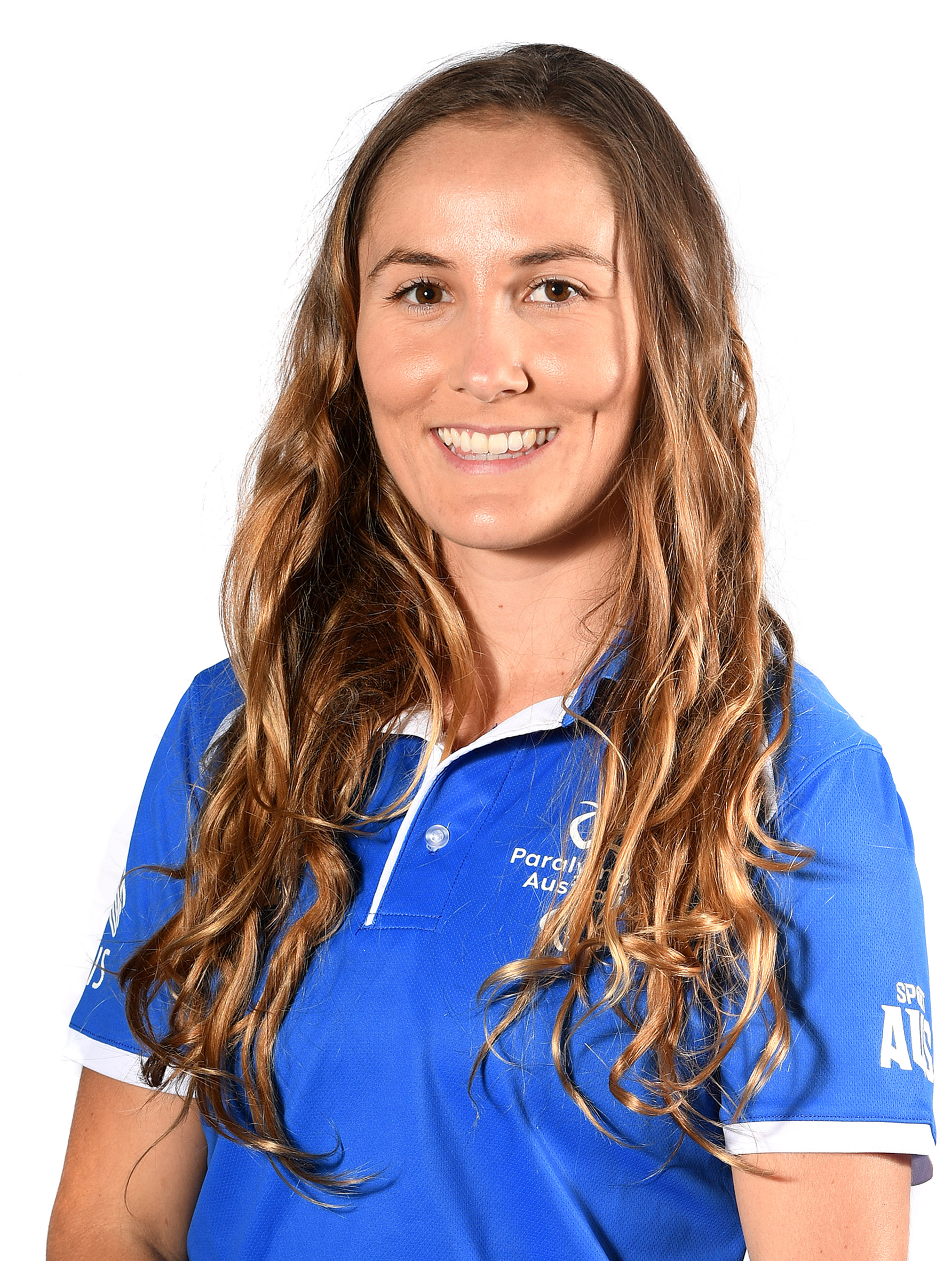
- Rae Anderson in April 2021

Personal information
- Born: 16 February 1997 (age 29)

Sport
- Country: Australia
- Sport: Track and field (F37/38); Alpine skiing (LW6/8-2)
- Club: Mingara Athletics Club

Rae Anderson (born 16 February 1997) is an Australian Paralympic athlete with cerebral palsy. She represented Australia at the 2016 Rio Paralympics in athletics and in alpine skiing at the 2022 Winter Paralympics. She became the seventh Australian Paralympic athlete to represent Australia at a Summer and Winter Paralympics.

== Personal ==
Anderson was born 16 February 1997 with cerebral palsy, left hemiplegia but it was not diagnosed until she was one. As a child she had three major operations at Westmead Children's Hospital. She attended Terrigal High School on the Central Coast, New South Wales. She has completed a Bachelor of Arts at the University of Sydney. In 2022, Anderson moved to Indonesia for six months to undertake a degree in cultural studies at the Gadjah Mada University in Yogyakarta. In 2021, Anderson is the Project Coordinator for the Activate Inclusion Sports Days (AISD) and Start Up Kidz program for Disability Sports Australia.

== Athletics ==
In her early teenage years, Anderson learnt to sail and played soccer, basketball and oz tag. A meeting with Evan O'Hanlon led to her taking up athletics in 2010. At the 2014 Commonwealth Games, she competed in the Women's Long Jump F37/38 and finished 7th with a jump of 3.67m(+0.9). At the 2015 IPC Athletics World Championships, she competed in two throwing events and finished 7th in the Women's Discus F38 and 6th in the Women's Javelin F37. In 2016 she became the first Australian woman with a disability to model for a lingerie company after becoming the face of underwear brand ModiBodi. She competed in the 2016 Rio Paralympics, placing 5th in the F38 Shot put event and 8th in the F37 Discus event.

At the 2017 World Para Athletics Championships in London, England, she finished second in the Women's Javelin F37 with a throw of 24.98m but this event was a non-medal event.

== Skiing ==
After the 2017 World Para Athletics Championships in London, Anderson transferred to skiing with the aim of competing at the 2022 Winter Paralympics. She is classified as LW9-1. At the 2022 Winter Paralympics, Anderson finished seventh in the Women's Slalom Standing and tenth in the Women's Giant Slalom Standing.

== Football ==
In 2022, Anderson became a member of the Paramatildas. She was awarded received the Rookie of the Year title in 2022.
