= Ashlyn Renneberg =

Canadian Paralympic athlete (born 2005)

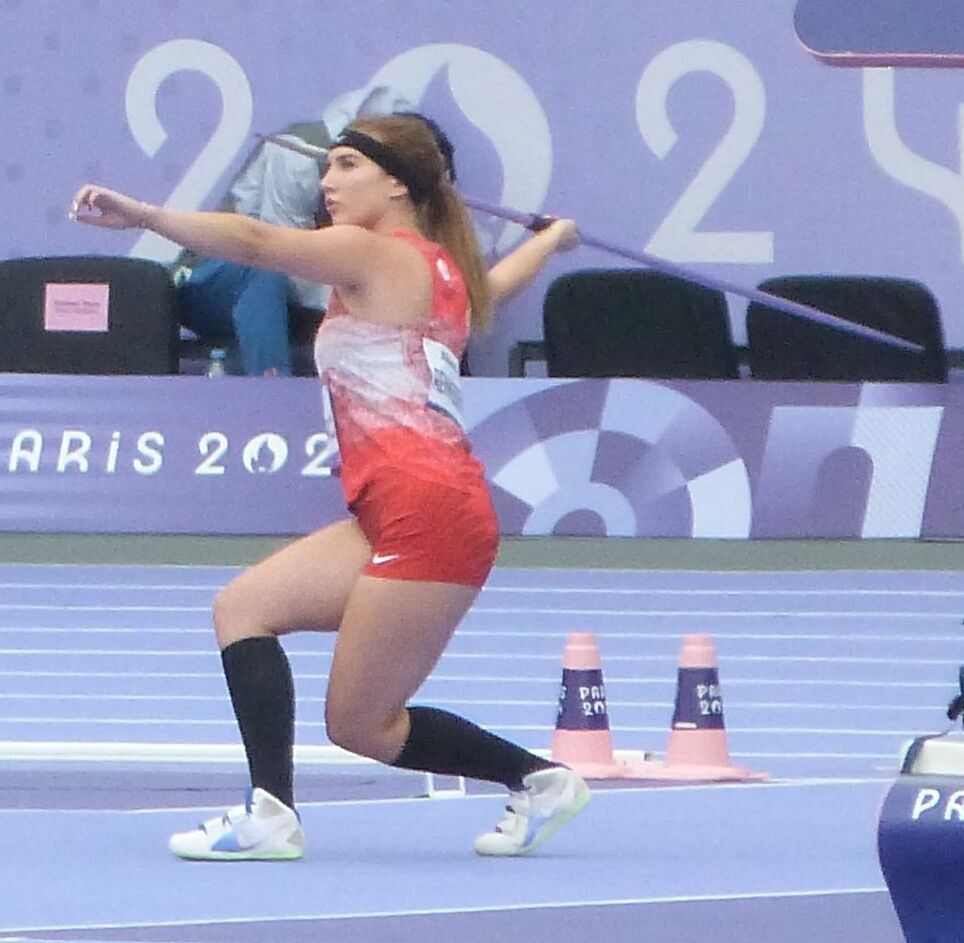

Personal information
- Born: January 26, 2005 (age 21) Saskatoon, Saskatchewan, Canada

Sport
- Sport: Paralympic athletics
- Disability class: F13
- Event: Javelin throw

Ashlyn Renneberg (born January 26, 2005) is a Canadian Paralympic athlete who competes in international track and field competitions, she specialises in javelin throw. She competed at the 2024 Summer Paralympics. Renneberg is also a record holder for Canadian and Americas' javelin throw in her sports category which she achieved at the 2025 World Para Athletics Championships in September 2025.

Renneberg was diagnosed with a subependymoma tumour when she was 13 years old after experiencing visual problems.
