= Yanivé Torres Martinez =

Colombian para-athlete (born 1979)

Personal information
- Born: 26 November 1979 (age 46) Puente Nacional, Santander, Colombia

Sport
- Sport: Paralympic athletics
- Disability class: F54
Medal record
Representing Colombia
Parapan American Games
Gold medal – first place	2011 Guadalajara	Shot put F54/55/56
Gold medal – first place	2019 Lima	Javelin throw F54
Gold medal – first place	2023 Santiago	Javelin throw F54
Silver medal – second place	2015 Toronto	Discus throw F54

Yanivé Torres Martínez (born 26 November 1979) is a Colombian Paralympic athlete who competes in international track and field competitions. She is a three-time Parapan American Games champion and has competed at the 2012, 2016 and 2020 Summer Paralympics.

Torres Martinez had a spinal injury and contracted hepatitis A after falling off an orange tree when she was seventeen years old.
