= Lin Sitong =

Chinese Paralympic athlete (born 2000)

Personal information
- Nationality: Chinese
- Born: 19 June 2000 (age 26) Ningde, China

Sport
- Sport: Para-athletics
- Disability class: F55
- Event: javelin throw
Medal record
Para-athletics
Representing China
Paralympic Games
Bronze medal – third place	2024 Paris	Javelin throw F56
World Championships
Bronze medal – third place	2024 Kobe	Javelin throw F56
Asian Para Games
Gold medal – first place	2022 Hangzhou	Javelin throw F56

Lin Sitong (born 19 June 2000) is a Chinese para-athlete specializing in javelin throw. She represented China at the 2024 Summer Paralympics.

== Career ==
Lin represented China at the 2024 World Para Athletics Championships and won a bronze medal in the javelin throw F56 event. As a result, she qualified for the 2024 Summer Paralympics. At the 2024 Summer Paralympics, she won a bronze medal in the javelin throw F56 event.
