= Hashemiyeh Motaghian =

Iranian Paralympic athlete

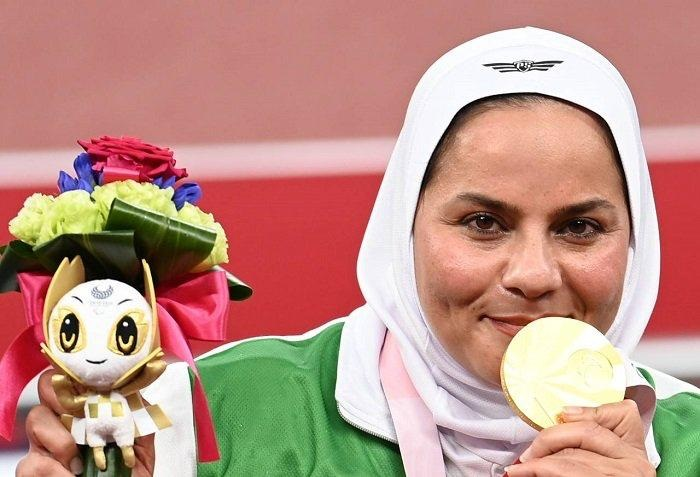
- Motaghian in Paralympics 2020 Tokyo

Personal information
- Full name: Hashemiyeh Motaghian Moavi
- Nationality: Iranian
- Born: 22 May 1986 (age 40) Ahvaz, Iran

Sport
- Sport: Para-athletics
- Disability class: F56
- Event: Javelin throw
Medal record
Women's para-athletics
Representing Iran
Paralympic Games
Gold medal – first place	2020 Tokyo	Javelin throw F56
World Championships
Silver medal – second place	2017 London	Javelin throw F56
Silver medal – second place	2019 Dubai	Javelin throw F56
Silver medal – second place	2024 Kobe	Javelin throw F56
Bronze medal – third place	2023 Paris	Javelin throw F56
Asian Para Games
Gold medal – first place	2018 Jakarta	Discus throw F56/57
Gold medal – first place	2022 Hangzhou	Javelin throw F56
Silver medal – second place	2018 Jakarta	Javelin throw F55/56
Silver medal – second place	2014 Incheon	Javelin throw F55/56
Silver medal – second place	2014 Incheon	Discus throw F56/57
Bronze medal – third place	2026 Aichi–Nagoya	Javelin throw F55/56
Islamic Solidarity Games
Gold medal – first place	2025 Riyadh	Javelin Throw F55/56

Hashemiyeh Motaghian Moavi (Persian: هاشمیه متقیان معاوی, born May 22, 1986) is an Iranian Paralympic athlete.

== Career ==
She represented Iran at the 2020 Summer Paralympics in Tokyo, Japan and won the gold medal in the javelin throw F56 event with a world record of 24.50.
