= Naibys Morillo =

Venezuelan Paralympic athlete

Personal information
- Born: 5 March 2000 (age 26)

Sport
- Country: Venezuela
- Sport: Para-athletics
- Disability class: F46
- Event: Javelin throw

Naibys Morillo (born 5 March 2000) is a Venezuelan para-athlete specializing in the javelin throw. She won the gold medal at the 2024 Summer Paralympics in the F46 class.
