= Lise Petersen =

German Paralympic athlete (born 2005)

Personal information
- Born: 27 June 2005 (age 21) Heide, Germany

Sport
- Sport: Paralympic athletics
- Club: TSV Bayer 04 Leverkusen
Medal record
Representing Germany
World Junior Championships
Gold medal – first place	2019 Nottwil	Javelin throw F45-64

Lise Petersen (born 27 June 2005) is a German Paralympic athlete who competes in international track and field competitions. She is a World junior champion in javelin throw. She competed at the 2020 and 2024 Summer Paralympics.

Petersen trains at a sports boarding school in Leverkusen founded by her mentor Steffi Nerius.
