= Holly Robinson (athlete) =

New Zealand para-athlete (born 1994)

Holly Robinson MNZM
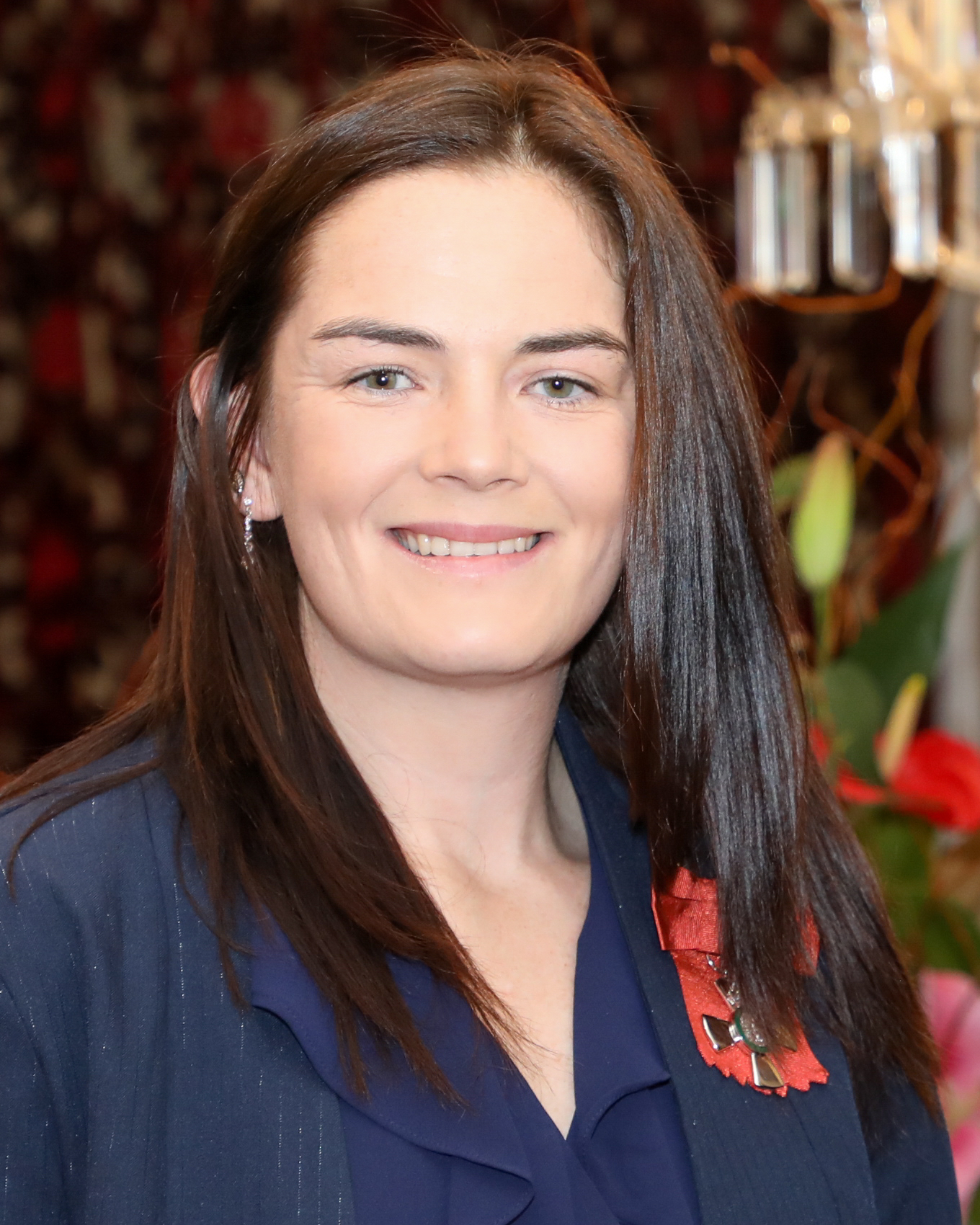
- Robinson in 2022

Personal information
- Full name: Holly Irene Robinson
- Born: 10 December 1994 (age 31) Hokitika, New Zealand
- Home town: Dunedin, New Zealand

Sport
- Country: New Zealand
- Sport: Athletics
- Disability class: F46
- Event: Javelin throw
- Club: Athletics Taieri

Achievements and titles
- Personal best: 45.73 m (2021)
Medal record
Women's para athletics
Representing New Zealand
Paralympic Games
Silver medal – second place	2016 Rio de Janeiro	Javelin F46
Gold medal – first place	2020 Tokyo	Javelin F46
Bronze medal – third place	2024 Paris	Shot put F46
World Championships
Silver medal – second place	2013 Lyon	Javelin F46
Silver medal – second place	2017 London	Javelin F46
Silver medal – second place	2024 Kobe	Shot put F46
Silver medal – second place	2025 New Delhi	Shot put F46
Bronze medal – third place	2015 Doha	Javelin F46
Commonwealth Games
Silver medal – second place	2018 Gold Coast	Javelin F46

Holly Irene Robinson MNZM (born 10 December 1994) is a New Zealand para-athlete, primarily competing in the javelin throw. She represented New Zealand at the 2012, 2016 and 2020 Summer Paralympics, winning silver in 2016 and gold in 2020. At the 2016 Games, she was New Zealand's flagbearer for the opening ceremony.

== Early life ==
Robinson was born in Hokitika, on the South Island's West Coast, and is of Ngāi Tahu descent. She has a twin brother, Jonathon, and her father Steve represented the West Coast in Heartland Championship rugby. Robinson has a congenital limb reduction with her left arm ending below the elbow. She attended Westland High School and later Taieri College after moving to Dunedin.

== Sporting career ==
Robinson started competing in para-athletics at age 12. She is classified F46 for field events and T47 for track events and long jump. Robinson's first major international competition was the 2011 IPC Athletics World Championships in Christchurch, New Zealand, achieving a fifth-place ranking in the women's javelin throw F46 and a seventh-place ranking in the women's shot put F42–44/46. She was selected to represent New Zealand at the 2012 Summer Paralympics, the sole female athletics competitor selected. She finished seventh in the women's javelin F46, with a 32.58 m throw. Robinson won her first international competition medal at the 2013 IPC Athletics World Championships, earning a silver medal with a 34.37 m throw.

At the 2015 IPC Athletics World Championships, Robinson earned a bronze medal with a 38.18 m throw. At the 2016 Australian Athletics Championships she set a New Zealand national record with a throw of 40.81 m, ranking her number one in the world for the javelin F46 during the Paralympic qualifying period and earning her a slot at the 2016 Paralympics Games. She was officially confirmed to represent New Zealand at the Paralympics on 23 May 2016.

At the 2016 Summer Paralympics, Robinson won the silver medal in the women's javelin throw F46, with a personal best throw of 41.22 m. At the 2018 Commonwealth Games, Robinson won the silver medal in the women's javelin throw with a personal best throw of 43.32m.

In September 2021 Robinson donated a US$50,000 prize to Ronald McDonald House South Island.

In the 2022 Queen's Birthday and Platinum Jubilee Honours, Robinson was appointed a Member of the New Zealand Order of Merit, for services to athletics.

== Statistics ==
=== Personal bests ===
Event	Distance	Date	Location	Notes
Javelin (F46)	45.73 m	6 April 2019	Sydney, Australia	AR
Shot put (F46)	10.84 m	15 April 2014	Beijing, China	NR
Discus (F46)	34.62 m	20 February 2016	Dunedin, New Zealand	NR

=== Javelin throw progression ===
Year	Performance	Competition	Location	Date	World ranking
2011	30.61 m		Melbourne, Australia	16 April	7
2012	32.58 m	Summer Paralympics	London, United Kingdom	1 September	7
2013	34.37 m	IPC Athletics World Championships	Lyon, France	22 July	3
2014	35.58 m		Beijing, China	16 April	2
2015	38.18 m	IPC Athletics World Championships	Doha, Qatar	31 October	4
2016	41.22 m	Summer Paralympics	Rio de Janeiro, Brazil	13 September	2
2017	42.68 m	Otago Championships	Dunedin, New Zealand	26 February	
2018	43.32 m	Commonwealth Games	Gold Coast, Australia	8 April	
2019	45.73 m	Australian Championships	Sydney, Australia	6 April	
2020	40.64 m		Dunedin, New Zealand	25 January	
2021	44.26 m	New Zealand Championships	Hastings, New Zealand	27 March	
