= Lizaveta Piatrenka =

Belarusian Paralympic athlete

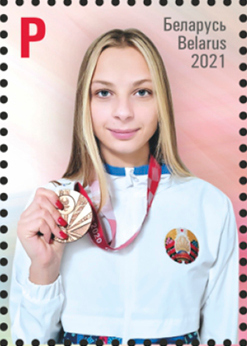

Personal information
- Nationality: Belarusian
- Born: 21 April 2002 (age 24) Mogilev, Belarus

Sport
- Sport: Paralympic athletics
- Disability class: F13
- Event: Javelin throw
- Coached by: Ihar Fartunau
Medal record
Paralympic athletics
Representing Belarus
Paralympic Games
Bronze medal – third place	2020 Tokyo	Javelin throw F13
European Championships
Silver medal – second place	2021 Bydgoszcz	Javelin throw F13

Lizaveta Piatrenka (born 21 April 2002) is a Belarusian visually impaired Paralympic athlete specializing in javelin throw. She represented Belarus at the 2020 Summer Paralympics.

== Career ==
Piatrenka represented Belarus in the javelin throw F13 event at the 2020 Summer Paralympics and won a bronze medal.
