= Natalija Eder =

Austrian Paralympic athlete

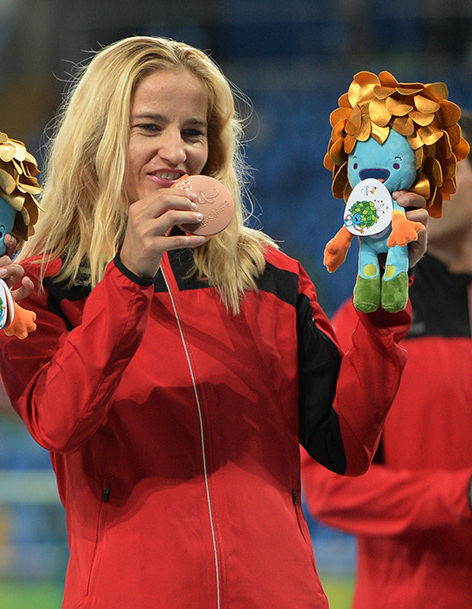

Personal information
- Nationality: Belarusian/Austrian
- Born: 6 August 1980 (age 45) Grodno, Byelorussian SSR, Soviet Union
- Height: 162 cm (5 ft 4 in)

Sport
- Country: Austria
- Sport: Athletics
- Disability class: F12
- Event(s): shot put, javelin
- Club: ABSV-Wien: Vienna
- Coached by: Gregor Hopler
Medal record
Paralympic athletics
Representing Austria
Paralympic Games
Bronze medal – third place	2012 London	Javelin - F12/13
Bronze medal – third place	2016 Rio de Janeiro	Javelin - F13
Bronze medal – third place	2024 Paris	Javelin throw F13
World Championships
Silver medal – second place	2013 Lyon	Javelin throw F12/13
Silver medal – second place	2024 Kobe	Javelin throw F13
Bronze medal – third place	2023 Paris	Javelin throw F13
European Championships
Silver medal – second place	2014 Swansea	Javelin - F12
Silver medal – second place	2016 Grosseto	Javelin - F11-13

Natalija Eder (born 6 August 1980) is a visually impaired Paralympian athlete from Austria competing mainly in F12 classification throwing events. She won a bronze medal in javelin throw at the 2012 and 2016 Summer Paralympics.

== Career ==
Eder took up para-sports in 1997 while still living in her home country of Belarus. She moved to Austria in 2003 and represented her new country in the 2012 Summer Paralympics in London.

Eder has also won medals at IPC World and European Championships.

She again competed at the 2020 Summer Paralympics and placed fourth.

In 2023, she won the bronze medal in the women's javelin throw F13 event at the World Para Athletics Championships held in Paris, France.
