= Noëlle Roorda =

Dutch Paralympic athlete

Personal information
- Born: 19 May 2000 (age 26) Amstelveen, Netherlands
- Height: 1.73 m (5 ft 8 in)

Sport
- Country: Netherlands
- Sport: Paralympic athletics
- Disability class: F46
- Event: Javelin throw
Medal record
Paralympic athletics
Representing Netherlands
Paralympic Games
Silver medal – second place	2020 Tokyo	Javelin throw F46
World Championships
Gold medal – first place	2025 New Delhi	Javelin throw F46
Bronze medal – third place	2024 Kobe	Javelin throw F46
European Championships
Gold medal – first place	2021 Bydgoszcz	Javelin throw F46

Noëlle Roorda (born 19 May 2000) is a Dutch Paralympic athlete who competes in the javelin throw at international elite competitions. She is a European champion and has been selected to compete at the 2020 Summer Paralympics. She won the silver medal with a personal best of 40.06m.

Roorda was inspired to take part in athletics by admiring her idol Thomas Röhler.
