= Saška Sokolov =

Serbian Paralympic athlete (born 1995)

Personal information
- National team: Serbia
- Born: 15 May 1995 (age 31) Pirot, FR Yugoslavia

Sport
- Country: Serbia
- Sport: Javelin throw
- Disability class: F46
Medal record
Women's para athletics
Representing Serbia
World Championships
Silver medal – second place	2023 Paris	Shot put F46
Silver medal – second place	2023 Paris	200 m T47
Silver medal – second place	2024 Kobe	Javelin throw F46
Silver medal – second place	2024 Kobe	100 m T47
Bronze medal – third place	2024 Kobe	200 m T47

Saška Sokolov (born 15 May 1995) is a Serbian athlete who competed for her nation in the javelin throw at the 2016 Summer Paralympics, and 2020 Summer Paralympics.

== Career ==
Saška Sokolov was born in Pirot, Serbia, the daughter of football coach Sasha Sokolov. As a child, she began to participate in football, but as Pirot did not have a women's team, she switched to handball where she played for ŽRK Pirot. In 2013, she moved to Belgrade, where she attended the Faculty of Special Education and Rehabilitation. She had moved to the capital to study defectology. While there, she took up javelin throw, and became Junior European Champion within three months. She also won the gold medal in the shot put. Within a year, she had qualified for the 2016 Summer Paralympics with a personal best throw of 34.8 metres (114 ft).

While at the 2016 Games, she was one of the youngest competitors. Sokolov competed in the F46 class of the women's javelin throw where she finished in sixth place with a longest throw of 33.26 metres (109.1 ft). She afterwards spoke of her desire to win the event at the 2020 Summer Paralympics in Tokyo, Japan.

She competed at the 2018 European Championships, where she won a bronze medal.
