= Uzbekistan at the 2022 Asian Para Games =

- IPC code: UZB
- NPC: Uzbekistan National Paralympic Association

in Hangzhou, China 22–28 October 2023
- Competitors: 103 in 11 sports
- Flag bearer: Nurkhon Kurbanova
- Medals Ranked 8th: Gold 25 Silver 24 Bronze 31 Total 80

Asian Para Games appearances
- 2010; 2014; 2018; 2022; 2026

Uzbekistan competed at the 2022 Asian Para Games in Hangzhou, China from 22 to 28 October 2023. Originally scheduled to take place from 9 to 15 October 2022, the event was postponed to 2023 on 17 May 2022 due to the COVID-19 pandemic.

== Medalists ==
The following Uzbekistan competitors won medals at the Games.

Medal	Name	Sport	Event	Date
Gold	Shakhnoza Mamadalieva	Canoeing	Women's VL3	23 Oct
Gold	Irodakhon Rustamova	Canoeing	Women's VL2	23 Oct
Gold	Azizbek Abdulkhabibov	Canoeing	Men's KL2	23 Oct
Gold	Safiya Burkhanova	Athletics	Women's Shot Put	23 Oct
Gold	Kemran Nurillaev	Judo	Men's -60 kg J2	23 Oct
Gold	Muzaffar Tursunkhujaev	Swimming	Men's 100m Butterfly	23 Oct
Gold	Khasan Kuldashev	Canoeing	Men's KL3	24 Oct
Gold	Shakhnoza Mirzaeva	Canoeing	Women's KL3	24 Oct
Gold	Khaytmurot Sherkuziev	Canoeing	Men's VL3	24 Oct
Gold	Doniyor Saliev	Athletics	Men's Long Jump-T12	24 Oct
Gold	Dmitriy Khorlin	Swimming	400 m Freestyle-S13	24 Oct
Gold	Shahinakhon Yigitalieva	Athletics	Women's Javelin Throw-F46	24 Oct
Gold	Doniyorjon Akhmedov	Athletics	Men's Long Jump-T13	25 Oct
Gold	Guljanoy Naimova	Taekwondo	Women's K44 +65 kg	25 Oct
Gold	Mokhigul Khamdamova	Athletics	Women's Discus Throw-F56/57	25 Oct
Gold	Asila Mirzayorova	Athletics	Women's Long Jump-T11/12	25 Oct
Gold	Mukhammad Rikhsimov	Athletics	Men's Shot Put-F63	25 Oct
Gold	Kirill Pankov	Swimming	Men's 100m Backstroke-S13	26 Oct
Gold	Bobirjon Omonov	Athletics	Men's Shot Put-F41	26 Oct
Gold	Nurkhon Kurbanova	Athletics	Women's Javelin Throw-F54	26 Oct
Gold	Omadbek Khasanov	Athletics	Men's Long Jump-T47	27 Oct
Gold	Kubaro Khakimova	Athletics	Women's Shot Put-F41	27 Oct
Gold	Kudratillokhon Marufkhujaev	Athletics	Men's Shot Put-F37	27 Oct
Gold	Islam Aslanov	Swimming	50 m Freestyle	27 Oct
Gold	Kholmurod Egamberdiev	Rowing	PR1 Men's Single Sculls	28 Oct
Silver	Khosiyatkhon Poziljonova	Judo	Women's -57 kg J1	23 Oct
Silver	Ziyodakhon Isokova	Taekwondo	Women's K44 -47 kg	23 Oct
Silver	Yorkinbek Odilov	Athletics	Men's Javelin Throw-F57	23 Oct
Silver	Sherzod Namozov	Judo	Men's -60 kg J2	23 Oct
Silver	Temurbek Giyasov	Athletics	Men's High Jump-T64	23 Oct
Silver	Islam Aslanov	Swimming	Men's 100m Butterfly	23 Oct
Silver	Natalya Semyonova	Athletics	Men's Javelin Throw-F56	23 Oct
Silver	Nozimakhon Kayumova	Athletics	Women's Javelin Throw-F12/13	24 Oct
Silver	Izzat Turgunov	Athletics	Men's Long Jump-T36	24 Oct
Silver	Nurkhon Kurbonova	Athletics	Women's Shot Put-F54	24 Oct
Silver	Feruz Sayidov	Judo	Men's -73 kg J2	24 Oct
Silver	Firdavsbek Musabekov	Swimming	Men's 100m Breaststroke-SB13	24 Oct
Silver	Feruza Ergasheva	Judo	Women's +70 kg J1	25 Oct
Silver	Munisa Madrimova	Judo	Women's -70 kg J2	25 Oct
Silver	Muslima Nuriddinova	Powerlifting	Women's -55 kg	25 Oct
Silver	Golibbek Mirzoyarov	Cycling	Men's C2 3000m Ind. Pursuit	25 Oct
Silver	Aloviddin Jurakulov	Judo	Men's +90 kg J2	25 Oct
Silver	Muzaffar Tursunkhujaev	Swimming	Men's 100m Backstroke-S13	26 Oct
Silver	Kudratoy Toshpulatova	Powerlifting	Women's -67 kg	26 Oct
Silver	Elbek Sultonov	Athletics	Men's Shot Put-F12	27 Oct
Silver	Tolibboy Yuldashev	Athletics	Men's Shot Put-F37	27 Oct
Silver	Farhod Umirzakov	Powerlifting	Men's -97 kg	27 Oct
Silver	Muzaffar Tursunkhujaev	Swimming	50 m Freestyle	27 Oct
Silver	Otabek Kuchkorov; Gulchiroy Esanboeva	Rowing	PR2 Mixed Double Sculls	28 Oct
Bronze	Sarvar Azimov	Athletics	Men's Club Throw	23 Oct
Bronze	Uljon Amrieva	Judo	Women's -57 kg J1	23 Oct
Bronze	Fotima Tairova	Judo	Women's -48 kg J1	23 Oct
Bronze	Lobar Khurramova	Judo	Women's -48 kg J2	23 Oct
Bronze	Urganchbek Egamnazarov	Athletics	Men's Long Jump-T11	23 Oct
Bronze	Doniyorjon Akhmedov	Athletics	Men's 100m-T13	23 Oct
Bronze	Sanjarbek Mukhtorov	Taekwondo	Men's K44 -58 kg	23 Oct
Bronze	Kirill Pankov	Swimming	Men's 100m Butterfly	23 Oct
Bronze	Kudratjon Haydarov	Taekwondo	Men's K44 -63 kg	24 Oct
Bronze	Javokhir Alikulov	Taekwondo	Men's K44 -70 kg	24 Oct
Bronze	Kumushkhon Khodjaeva	Judo	Women's -57 kg J2	24 Oct
Bronze	Uchkun Kuranbaev	Judo	Men's -73 kg J2	24 Oct
Bronze	Mokhigul Khamdamova	Athletics	Women's Shot Put-F57	24 Oct
Bronze	Firdavsbek Musabekov	Swimming	400 m Freestyle-S13	24 Oct
Bronze	Bekzod Jamilov	Powerlifting	Men's -72 kg	25 Oct
Bronze	Asadbek Toshtemirov	Taekwondo	Women's K44 -80 kg	25 Oct
Bronze	Azimbek Abdullaev	Cycling	Men's C4-5 4000m Individual Pursuit	25 Oct
Bronze	Asadbek Anvarov	Taekwondo	Men's K44 +80 kg	25 Oct
Bronze	Khusniddin Norbekov	Athletics	Men's Shot Put-F35	25 Oct
Bronze	Yokutkhon Kholbekova	Athletics	Women's Long Jump-T11/12	25 Oct
Bronze	Azizbek Boynazarov	Swimming	Men's 100m Butterfly-S8	25 Oct
Bronze	Boymurodov Yavkochev	Cycling	Men's C4-5 Time Trial	26 Oct
Bronze	Asila Mirzayorova	Athletics	Women's 200m-T11	26 Oct
Bronze	Shahnozahon Adhamova	Athletics	Women's Discus Throw-F11	27 Oct
Bronze	Firdavsbek Musabekov	Swimming	Men's 200m IM	27 Oct
Bronze	Kirill Pankov	Swimming	50 m Freestyle	27 Oct
Bronze	Mukhayyo Abdusattorova	Rowing	PR1 Women's Single Sculls	28 Oct
Bronze	Abdumutal Abdurakhmonov; Gulzoda Shotanova; Kudratulla Khabibullaev; Diyora Dodoeva	Rowing	PR3 Mixed Coxed Four	28 Oct
Bronze	Madina Mukhtorova	Athletics	Women's Discus Throw-F40/41	28 Oct
Bronze	Yokutkhon Kholbekova	Athletics	Women's 400m-T12	28 Oct
Bronze	Asila Mirzayorova	Athletics	Women's 400m-T11	28 Oct

Medals by sport
Sport	1st place, gold medalist(s)	2nd place, silver medalist(s)	3rd place, bronze medalist(s)	Total
Athletics	12	8	11	31
Canoeing	6	0	0	6
Cycling	0	1	2	3
Judo	1	6	5	12
Powerlifting	0	3	1	4
Rowing	1	1	2	4
Swimming	4	4	5	13
Taekwondo	1	1	5	7

Medals by day
Day	Date	1st place, gold medalist(s)	2nd place, silver medalist(s)	3rd place, bronze medalist(s)	Total
1	October 23	6	7	8	21
2	October 24	6	5	6	17
3	October 25	5	5	7	17
4	October 26	3	2	2	7
5	October 27	4	4	3	11
6	October 28	1	1	5	7

== Competitors ==
The following is a list of the number of competitors representing Uzbekistan that will participate at the Asian Para Games:

Sport	Men	Women	Total
Athletics	20	15	35
Chess	2	2	4
Canoeing	3	3	6
Cycling	4	0	4
Judo	12	8	20
Powerlifting	2	3	5
Rowing	4	4	8
Shooting	1	1	2
Swimming	8	0	8
Taekwondo	7	2	9
Table tennis	2	0	2
Total	66	37	103

== Athletics ==
=== Track ===
Men

Athlete	Event	Class	Heat		Final	
Athlete	Event	Class	Time	Rank	Time	Rank
Urganchbek Egamnazarov	100m	T11	31.89	4	Did not advance	
Miran Sakhatov	100m	T11	Disqualified		Did not advance	
Doniyorjon Akhmedov	100m	T13	—N/a		11.35	3rd place, bronze medalist(s)
Jamoliddin Akobirov	100m	T36	14.37	4	14.34	7
Izzat Turgunov	100m	T36	12.60	4	12.64	5
Miran Sakhatov	400m	T11	56.11	3	—N/a	
Jamoliddin Akobirov	400m	T36	—N/a		1:01.77	5
Izzat Turgunov	400m	T36	—N/a		1:04.30	6
Marufjon Murodulloev	400m	T47	—N/a			

Women

Athlete	Event	Class	Heat		Final	
Athlete	Event	Class	Time	Rank	Time	Rank
Asila Mirzayorova	100m	T11	Disqualified		Did not advance	
Asila Mirzayorova	200m	T11	27.68	2	26.55	3rd place, bronze medalist(s)
Yokutkhon Kholbekova	200m	T12	27.77	3	Did not advance	
Asila Mirzayorova	400m	T11	1:00.58	1	1:01.37	3rd place, bronze medalist(s)
Yokutkhon Kholbekova	400m	T12	1:01.76	1	1:01.01	3rd place, bronze medalist(s)

=== Field ===
Men

Athlete	Event	Class	Final	
Athlete	Event	Class	Result	Rank
Temurbek Giyasov	High jump	T64	2.02	2nd place, silver medalist(s)
Urganchbek Egamnazarov	Long Jump	T11	6.32	3rd place, bronze medalist(s)
Doniyor Saliev	Long Jump	T12	7.28	1st place, gold medalist(s)
Doniyorjon Akhmedov	Long Jump	T13	6.88	1st place, gold medalist(s)
Jamoliddin Akobirov	Long Jump	T36	4.56	5
Izzat Turgunov	Long Jump	T36	5.55	2nd place, silver medalist(s)
Omadbek Khasanov	Long Jump	T47	7.21	1st place, gold medalist(s)
Temurbek Giyasov	Long Jump	T64	5.42	7
Kudratillokhon Marufkhujaev	Discus throw	F37	44.64	6
Tolibboy Yuldashev	Discus throw	F37	46.54	5
Elbek Sultonov	Shot put	F12	15.37	2nd place, silver medalist(s)
Sarvarbek Normetov	Shot put	F33	7.12	5
Khusniddin Norbekov	Shot put	F35	15.90	3rd place, bronze medalist(s)
Shakhboz Rajabov	Shot put	F36	12.15	4
Kudratillokhon Marufkhujaev	Shot put	F37	14.89	1st place, gold medalist(s)
Tolibboy Yuldashev	Shot put	F37	14.09	2nd place, silver medalist(s)
Bobirjon Omonov	Shot put	F41	13.14	1st place, gold medalist(s)
Yorkinbek Odilov	Shot put	F57	12.10	6
Mukhammad Rikhsimov	Shot put	F63	14.52	1st place, gold medalist(s)
Bakhtiyor Negmatov	Javelin throw	F37/38	41.20	7
Yorkinbek Odilov	Javelin throw	F57	47.72	1st place, gold medalist(s)
Sarvar Azimov	Club throw	F32	39.13	3rd place, bronze medalist(s)

Women

Athlete	Event	Class	Final	
Athlete	Event	Class	Result	Rank
Yokutkhon Kholbekova	Long Jump	T11/T12	5.64	3rd place, bronze medalist(s)
Asila Mirzayorova	Long Jump	T11/T12	5.24	1st place, gold medalist(s)
Shahnozahon Adhamova	Discus throw	F11	27.08	3rd place, bronze medalist(s)
Kubaro Khakimova	Discus throw	F40/41	26.48	4
Madina Mukhtorova	Discus throw	F40/41	19.55	3rd place, bronze medalist(s)
Nurkhon Kurbanova	Discus throw	F54/55	17.45	7
Natalya Semyonova	Discus throw	F54/55	17.80	6
Mokhigul Khamdamova	Discus throw	F56/57	31.64	1st place, gold medalist(s)
Rokiyakhon Musinova	Discus throw	F56/57	23.62	6
Safiya Burkhanova	Shot put	F11/F12	13.87	1st place, gold medalist(s)
Dilafruzkhon Akhmatkhonova	Shot put	F35/F36/F37	9.14	4
Kubaro Khakimova	Shot put	F41	9.64	1st place, gold medalist(s)
Madina Mukhtorova	Shot put	F41	7.51	4
Roziyakhon Ergasheva	Shot put	F46	9.81	4
Shahinakhon Yigitalieva	Shot put	F46	9.74	5
Nurkhon Kurbanova	Shot put	F54	7.34	2nd place, silver medalist(s)
Mokhigul Khamdamova	Shot put	F57	9.31	3rd place, bronze medalist(s)
Rokiyakhon Musinova	Shot put	F57	7.17	5
Nozimakhon Kayumova	Javelin throw	F12/13	43.36	2nd place, silver medalist(s)
Roziyakhon Ergasheva	Javelin throw	F46	34.12	5
Shahinakhon Yigitalieva	Javelin throw	F46	40.90	1st place, gold medalist(s)
Nurkhon Kurbanova	Javelin throw	F54	18.95	1st place, gold medalist(s)
Natalya Semyonova	Javelin throw	F56	17.40	2nd place, silver medalist(s)
Makhliyo Akramova	Club throw	F32/51	20.52	4

== Chess ==
B1

Athlete	Event	Round 1	Round 2	Round 3	Round 4	Round 5	Round 6	Round 7	Total score	Rank
Athlete	Event	Opposition Score	Opposition Score	Opposition Score	Opposition Score	Opposition Score	Opposition Score	Opposition Score	Total score	Rank
Amrillo Abdullaev	Men's Individual Standard	Fitriyanto Prasetyo (INA); W 1–0	Dinh Tuan Son (VIE); W 1–0	Yoga Indra (INA); L 0–1	Moshirabadi Hadi (IRI); W 1–0	Ghoorchibeygi Alireza (IRI); L 0–1	Alizedah Mohammedreza (IRI); W 1–0	Pradhan Soundarya (IND); L 0–1	4	
Amrillo Abdullaev	Men's Individual Rapid	Fitriyanto Prasetyo (INA); W 1–0	Sarmiento Rodolfo (PHI); W 1–0	Dinh Tuan Son (VIE); W 1–0	Yoga Indra (INA); D ½–½	Inani Darpan Satish (INA); L 0–1	Ching Francis (PHI)			
Raykhona Sharofova	Women's Individual Standart	1	Pham Thi Huong (VIE); L 0–1	Sinaga Wilma (INA); L 0–1	Tran Ngoc Loan (VIE); L 0–1	Halawa Yustina (INA); L 0–1	Saganlal Jain (IND); L 0–1	More Sanskruti (IND); L 0–1	1	

B2/B3

Athlete	Event	Round 1	Round 2	Round 3	Round 4	Round 5	Round 6	Round 7	Total score	Rank
Athlete	Event	Opposition Score	Opposition Score	Opposition Score	Opposition Score	Opposition Score	Opposition Score	Opposition Score	Total score	Rank
Akhadkhon Kimsanboev	Men's Individual Standard	Suhrob Hamdamov (TJK); D ½–½	Majid Bagheri (IRI); D ½–½	Hartono Adji (INA); L 0–1	Yuan Shoubo (CHN); L 0–1	Jumadi (INA); W 1–0	Somendra (IND); W 1–0	Joshi Aryan (IND); D ½–½	3½	
Akhadkhon Kimsanboev	Men's Individual Rapid	Bernardo Darry (PHI); D ½–½	Majid Bagheri (IRI); W 1–0	Redor Menandro (PHI); L 0–1	Rabbi Khorasgani (IRI); D ½–½					
Durdona Jumonova	Women's Individual Standard	Fu Xinyu (CHN); W 1–0	Budiarti Farah (INA); L 0–1	Bates Amantayeva (KAZ); W 1–0	Khairunnisa (INA); L 0–1	Gawar Tijan (IND); W 1–0	Naghavi Mandi (IRI); L 0–1	Bilog Maria (PHI); W 1–0	4	

== Canoeing ==
Men

Athlete	Event	Final	
Athlete	Event	Time	Rank
Azizbek Abdulkhabibov	KL2	42.487	1st place, gold medalist(s)
Khasan Kuldashev	KL3	42.258	1st place, gold medalist(s)
Khaytmurot Sherkuziev	VL3	49.345	1st place, gold medalist(s)

Women

Athlete	Event	Final	
Athlete	Event	Time	Rank
Shakhnoza Mirzaeva	KL3	50.680	1st place, gold medalist(s)
Irodakhon Rustamova	VL2	1:02.125	1st place, gold medalist(s)
Shakhnoza Mamadalieva	VL3	58.775	1st place, gold medalist(s)

== Cycling ==
=== Men ===
Track

Athlete	Event	Qualifying round		Final	
Athlete	Event	Timing	Rank	Timing	Rank
Bunyod Khayitmakhammadov	C1-3 1000m Time Trial	1:24.662	11	Did not advance	
Golibbek Mirzoyarov	C1-3 1000m Time Trial	1:17.897	7	1:24.289	8
Azimbek Abdullaev	C4 1000m Time Trial	1:11.782	6	1:11.139	6
Boymurodov Yavkochev	C4 1000m Time Trial	1:12.511	7	1:12.993	7
Bunyod Khayitmakhammadov	Men's C1 3000m Individual Pursuit	4:40.062	4	—N/a	4
Golibbek Mirzoyarov	Men's C2 3000m Individual Pursuit	4:03.751	2	1:26.601	2nd place, silver medalist(s)
Azimbek Abdullaev	Men's C4-5 4000m Individual Pursuit	4:54.573	4	—N/a	3rd place, bronze medalist(s)
Boymurodov Yavkochev	Men's C4-5 4000m Individual Pursuit	4:53.473	3	—N/a	4

Road

Athlete	Event	Qualifying round		Final	
Athlete	Event	Timing	Rank	Timing	Rank
Bunyod Khayitmakhammadov	Men's C1-3 Road Race	—N/a		1:37:07	12
Golibbek Mirzoyarov	Men's C1-3 Road Race	—N/a		1:31:59	7
Azimbek Abdullaev	Men's C4-5 Road Race	—N/a		1:48:08	12
Boymurodov Yavkochev	Men's C4-5 Road Race	—N/a		1:47:40	11
Bunyod Khayitmakhammadov	Men's C1-3 Time Trial	—N/a		20:13.49	6
Golibbek Mirzoyarov	Men's C1-3 Time Trial	—N/a		19:43.30	4
Azimbek Abdullaev	Men's C4-5 Time Trial	—N/a		26:16.24	4
Boymurodov Yavkochev	Men's C4-5 Time Trial	—N/a		26:10.86	3rd place, bronze medalist(s)
Golibbek Mirzoyarov; Azimbek Abdullaev; Boymurodov Yavkochev	Mixed C1-5 750m Team Sprint	57.826	5	Did not advance	

== Judo ==
Men

Athlete	Class	Event	Round of 16	Quarterfinal	Semifinal	Repechage R1	Repechage R2	Final / BM	
Athlete	Class	Event	Opposition Result	Opposition Result	Opposition Result	Opposition Result	Opposition Result	Opposition Result	Rank
Shukurov Sukhrob	J1	60 kg	Nashwan Shugaa (YEM); L 00–10	Did not advance	Did not advance	Abdikarimov Temirlan (KGZ); W 10s2-0	Kongsuk Viton (THA); W 10–1	Junaedi (INA); L 00–10	4
Diyorbek Maydonov	J1	60 kg	Bayasgalan Sukhbat (MGL); W 11–1	Banitaba Khorram (IRI); L 00–10	Did not advance	Rustam Mambetkulov (KAZ); L 00–11	Did not advance		
Shokhrukh Mamedov	J1	-73 kg	Bye	Zhou Zhiwei (CHN); W 10-0s1	Assylan Nurdauletov (KAZ); L 0-1s1	—N/a		Borchlou Mahdi (IRI); L 0–10	4
Turgun Abdiev	J1	-90 kg	Naranjargal Tserentogtokh (MGL); W 10–0	Abylay Adilbekov (KAZ); W 10–0	Gholamishafia Mousa (IRI); L 1–10	—N/a		Batkhuyag Battugs (MGL); L 1s1-10s1	4
Azizbek Normuminov	J1	+90 kg	—N/a	Xiakeerjiang Yilayin (CHN); W 10–0	Utepov Yerlan (CHN); L 0–10	—N/a		Navaei Ali (IRI); L 0–10	4
Sherzod Namozov	J2	60 kg	Bye	Zhao Xu (CHN); W 11–0	Lee Min Jae (KOR); W 10–0	—N/a		Kemran Nurillaev (UZB); L 0–10	2nd place, silver medalist(s)
Kemran Nurillaev	J2	60 kg	Bye	Kouhkan Seid (IRI); W 10–0	Anuar Sariyev (KAZ); W 11s1-0	—N/a		Sherzod Namozov (UZB); W 10–0	1st place, gold medalist(s)
Uchkun Kuranbaev	J2	-73 kg	Ma Jinxin (CHN); W 10–0	Seto Yujiro (JPN); L0s1-10	Did not advance	—N/a	Enkhtuya Davaadagva (MGL); W 10–0	Kim Donghoon (KOR); W 1s1-0	3rd place, bronze medalist(s)
Feruz Sayidov	J2	-73 kg	Bye	Azamat Nokushev (KAZ); W 11–0	Kim Donghoon (KOR); W 10-0s1	—N/a		Olzhas Orazalzyuly (KAZ); L 0H-0	2nd place, silver medalist(s)
Otabek Irisbekov	J2	-90 kg	Bye	Maalinkhuu Lantuu (MGL); W 10–0	Amanzhol Zhanbota (KAZ); L 0s2-10s1	—N/a		Smagululy Galmyhan (KAZ); L 0s1-1s2	4
Davurkhon Karomatov	J2	-90 kg	Bye	Jafari Seyed Omid (IRI); W 10–0	Lee Jung Min (KOR); L 0H-0s2	—N/a		Feng Bin (CHN); L 0–10	4
Aloviddin Jurakulov	J2	+90 kg	—N/a	—N/a	Azhgaliyev Talgat (KAZ); W 10–0	—N/a		Nouri Vahid (IRI); L 0H-0s1	2nd place, silver medalist(s)

Women

Athlete	Class	Event	Round of 16	Quarterfinal	Semifinal	Repechage R1	Repechage R2	Final / BM	
Athlete	Class	Event	Opposition Result	Opposition Result	Opposition Result	Opposition Result	Opposition Result	Opposition Result	Rank
Fotima Tairova	J1	-48 kg	Bye	Togtokhbayar Suvd-Erdene (MGL); W 1s2-0s2	Hangai Shizuka (JPN); L 0s1-1	Did not advance		Janki Bai (IND); W 10s1-0	3rd place, bronze medalist(s)
Mukharramkhon Abdusamatova	J1	-70 kg	Bye	Lkhaijav Turuunaa (MGL); L0-10	—N/a			Dinara Kujulova (KAZ); L 0–11	4
Lobar Khurramova	J1	J2	-48 kg	Bye	Lee Kai-Lin (TPE); W 1s1-0	Li Liqing (CHN); L 1-10s1	Did not advance	Liu Yi (CHN); W 1–0	3rd place, bronze medalist(s)
Kumushkhon Khodjaeva	-57 kg	J2	Bye		Hirose Junko (JPN); L0s1-10s2	—N/a		Kudo Hiroko (JPN); W 10–0	3rd place, bronze medalist(s)

Women's Preliminary Round

Athlete	Class	Event	First game	Second game	Third game	Fourth game	Rank
Athlete	Class	Event	Opposition Result	Opposition Result	Opposition Result	Opposition Result	Rank
Uljon Amrieva	J1	-57 kg	Khosiyatkhon Poziljonova (UZB); L 0–10	Alfiya Tlekkabyl (KAZ); W 10–0	Shi Yijie (CHN); L 0–10	—N/a	3rd place, bronze medalist(s)
Khosiyatkhon Poziljonova	J1	-57 kg	Uljon Amrieva (UZB); W 10–0	Alfiya Tlekkabyl (KAZ); W 10s2-0s1	Shi Yijie (CHN); L 0–10	—N/a	2nd place, silver medalist(s)
Feruza Ergasheva	J1	+70 kg	Tambupolon Roma (INA); L 0–10	Meng Yan (CHN); W 10–0	Rani Mukesh (IND); L 10–0	Aldhanhani Maryam (UAE); W 11–1	2nd place, silver medalist(s)
Munisa Madrimova	J2	-70 kg	Thongsri Pornnapa (THA); W 10–0	More Vrushali Ashok (IND); W 10–0	Wang Yue (CHN); L 0s1-10	—N/a	2nd place, silver medalist(s)

== Powerlifting ==
Men

Athlete	Event	Attempt 1	Attempt 2	Attempt 3	Total	Rank
Bekzod Jamilov	-72 kg	197	204	~~209~~	204	3rd place, bronze medalist(s)
Farhod Umirzakov	-97 kg	222	228	~~234~~	228	2nd place, silver medalist(s)

Women

Athlete	Event	Attempt 1	Attempt 2	Attempt 3	Total	Rank
Muslima Nuriddinova	-55 kg	99	104	107	107	2nd place, silver medalist(s)
Kudratoy Toshpulatova	-67 kg	115	116	~~121~~	116	2nd place, silver medalist(s)
Orzugul Urolova	-73 kg	~~118~~	~~118~~	~~120~~	—N/a	

== Rowing ==
Men

Athlete	Event	Heats		Final	
Athlete	Event	Time	Rank	Time	Rank
Kholmurod Egamberdiev	PR1 Men's Single Sculls	9:40.72	1	10:26.63	1st place, gold medalist(s)

Women

Athlete	Event	Heats		Final	
Athlete	Event	Time	Rank	Time	Rank
Mukhayyo Abdusattorova	PR1 Women's Single Sculls	11:14.88	3	12:28.83	3rd place, bronze medalist(s)

Mixed

Athlete	Event	Heats		Final	
Athlete	Event	Time	Rank	Time	Rank
Otabek Kuchkorov; Gulchiroy Esanboeva	PR2 Mixed Double Sculls	9:16.83	2	10:06.99	2nd place, silver medalist(s)
Abdumutal Abdurakhmonov; Gulzoda Shotanova; Kudratulla Khabibullaev; Diyora Dodoeva	PR3 Mixed Coxed Four	7:46.60	3	8:26.78	3rd place, bronze medalist(s)

== Shooting ==
Men

Athlete	Event	Qualification		Final	
Athlete	Event	Score	Rank	Score	Rank
Server Ibragimov	P1 - 10m Air Pistol SH1	559-11x	10	Did not advance	

Women

Athlete	Event	Qualification		Final	
Athlete	Event	Score	Rank	Score	Rank
Shakhnoza Mamajonova	P2 - 10m Air Pistol SH1	567-16x	2	106.4	8

Mixed

Athlete	Event	Qualification		Final	
Athlete	Event	Score	Rank	Score	Rank
Server Ibragimov	P4 - 50m Pistol SH1	531	6	88.6	8

== Swimming ==
Men

Athlete	Event	Class	Heats		Final	
Athlete	Event	Class	Time	Rank	Time	Rank
Bakhtiyorjon Ortikov	50 m Freestyle	S4	—N/a		56.77	6
Sardor Bakhtiyorov	50 m Freestyle	S7	32.22	2	31.81	4
Islam Aslanov	50 m Freestyle	S13	24.17	1	23.97	1st place, gold medalist(s)
Kirill Pankov	50 m Freestyle	S13	25.48	2	25.36	3rd place, bronze medalist(s)
Muzaffar Tursunkhujaev	50 m Freestyle	S13	25.08	1	24.64	2nd place, silver medalist(s)
Bakhtiyorjon Ortikov	100 m Freestyle	S4	—N/a		2:09.66	5
Bakhtiyorjon Ortikov	400 m Freestyle	S7	5:50.63	4	5:35.24	5
Dmitriy Khorlin	400 m Freestyle	S13	—N/a		4:24.68	1st place, gold medalist(s)
Firdavsbek Musabekov	400 m Freestyle	S13	—N/a		4:28.59	3rd place, bronze medalist(s)
Muzaffar Tursunkhujaev	400 m Freestyle	S13	—N/a		4:30.77	4
Bakhtiyorjon Ortikov	50 m Backstroke	S4	—N/a		58.81	5
Sardor Bakhtiyorov	100m Backstroke	S7	—N/a		1:21.94	4
Azizbek Boynazarov	100m Backstroke	S8	1:14.13	2	1:12.78	4
Islam Aslanov	100m Backstroke	S13	—N/a		1:05.40	4
Dmitriy Khorlin	100m Backstroke	S13	—N/a			
Kirill Pankov	100m Backstroke	S13	—N/a		1:02.82	1st place, gold medalist(s)
Muzaffar Tursunkhujaev	100m Backstroke	S13	—N/a		1:04.82	2nd place, silver medalist(s)
Azizbek Boynazarov	100 m Breaststroke	SB8	1:19.66	4	1:20.99	7
Muzaffar Tursunkhujaev	100 m Breaststroke	SB13	1:20.45	4	1:20.42	7
Firdavsbek Musabekov	100 m Breaststroke	SB13	1:11.53	1	1:08.36	2nd place, silver medalist(s)
Sardor Bakhtiyorov	50m Butterfly	S7	—N/a		34.42	5
Azizbek Boynazarov	100m Butterfly	S8	—N/a		1:09.03	3rd place, bronze medalist(s)
Islam Aslanov	100m Butterfly	S13	—N/a		59.36	2nd place, silver medalist(s)
Dmitriy Khorlin	100m Butterfly	S13	—N/a			
Kirill Pankov	100m Butterfly	S13	—N/a		1:00.22	3rd place, bronze medalist(s)
Muzaffar Tursunkhujaev	100m Butterfly	S13	—N/a		58.54	1st place, gold medalist(s)
Sardor Bakhtiyorov	200m Individual Medley	SM7	—N/a		3:19.64	7
Azizbek Boynazarov	200m Individual Medley	SM8	2:37.79	3	2:37.53	4
Dmitriy Khorlin	200m Individual Medley	SM13	2:26.80	3	2:20.96	4
Muzaffar Tursunkhujaev	200m Individual Medley	SM13	2:29.40	2	2:22.74	5
Firdavsbek Musabekov	200m Individual Medley	SM13	2:23.31	1	2:20.05	3rd place, bronze medalist(s)

== Taekwondo ==
Men

Athlete	Event	Round of 16	Quarterfinal	Semifinal	Repechange	Final / BM	
Athlete	Event	Opposition Result	Opposition Result	Opposition Result	Opposition Result	Opposition Result	Rank
Sanjarbek Mukhtorov	K44 -58 kg	Bye	Kaenkham Thanwa (THA); W 28–12	Xiao Xiang-wen (TPE); L 9-39	—N/a	Awatari Kentra (JPN); W 31–25	3rd place, bronze medalist(s)
Kudratjon Haydarov	K44 -63 kg	Al-Buhaydar Hussein (IRQ); W 16–9	Ni Zheyi (CHN); W 28–9	Ganbat Bolor-erdene (MGL); L 11–28	—N/a	Lee Dongho (KOR); W 36–22	3rd place, bronze medalist(s)
Zukhriddin Tokhirov	K44 -63 kg	Bye	Chen Chien-chiang (TPE); W 25–20	Sadeghiapour Saeid (IRI); L 13–25	—N/a	Sotthiset Tanapan (THA); L 0–2	4
Javokhir Alikulov	K44 -70 kg	Bye	Zhumagali Yerzhanov (KAZ); W 14–0	Pourrahnamaahmad Mahdi (IRI); L 5–14	—N/a	Batbayar Shinebayar (MGL); W 27–6	3rd place, bronze medalist(s)
Aslbek Khusanov	K44 -70 kg	Bye	Pourrahnamaahmad Mahdi (IRI); L 12–24	Did not advance	Zhumagali Yerzhanov (KAZ); W 29–10	Kudo Shunsoke (JPN); L 15–26	4
Asadbek Toshtemirov	K44 -80 kg	—N/a	Aljaber Abdulaziz (KSA); W 33–2	Bakhti Alireza (IRI); L 5–13	—N/a	Zhanbolat Kaziyev (KAZ); W 0-0	3rd place, bronze medalist(s)
Asadbek Anvarov	K44 +80 kg	—N/a	Alisher Gapirollayev (KAZ); L 9–10	Did not advance	Qarainees Ali Bader (BRN); W 21–3	Kim Taehun (KOR); W 21–18	3rd place, bronze medalist(s)

Women

Athlete	Event	Round of 16	Quarterfinal	Semifinal	Final / BM	
Athlete	Event	Opposition Result	Opposition Result	Opposition Result	Opposition Result	Rank
Ziyodakhon Isokova	K44 -47 kg	—N/a	Bye	Chen Tong Tong (CHN) W 8–3	Phuangkitcha Khwansuda (THA) L 2-2	2nd place, silver medalist(s)
Guljanoy Naimova	K44 +65 kg	—N/a	Bye	Tang Qi (CHN); W 12–0	Mirzaei Leila (IRI); W 16–0	1st place, gold medalist(s)

== Table tennis ==
Men

Athlete	Event	Group stage			Round of 16	Quarterfinal	Semifinal	Final
Athlete	Event	Opposition Score	Opposition Score	Rank	Opposition Score	Opposition Score	Opposition Score	Rank
Rasul Atamuratov	Singles Class 3	Feng Panfeng (CHN); L 0–3	Yin Chien-ping (TPE); L 0–3	3	Did not advance			
Sunnatillo Murodullaev	Singles Class 8	Lam Ka Wai (HKG); L 0–3	Prahasta Mohamad Rian (INA); W 3–2	1	Sun Churen (CHN); L 0–3	Did not advance		

== See also ==
- Uzbekistan at the 2022 Asian Games
