= Sitting volleyball at the 2022 Asian Para Games =

- Location: Hangzhou, Zhejiang, China
- Dates: 23–27 October 2023
- Nations: 9

Sitting volleyball at the 2022 Asian Para Games in Hangzhou, China took place between 23 and 27 October 2023.

== Draw ==
The men's and women's teams were drawn into three groups (Groups A and B for men, and Group C for women)

Men's		Women's
Group A	Group B	Group C
China; Japan; Myanmar; South Korea	Iran; Cambodia; Kazakhstan; Thailand	China; Thailand; Japan; Mongolia; Iran; South Korea

== Results ==
=== Men's tournament ===
Men's sitting volleyball at the 2022 Asian Para Games
- Dates: 23–27 October 2023
- Nations: 8

Medalists
gold medal	Iran
silver medal	Kazakhstan
bronze medal	China

==== Preliminary round ====
===== Group A =====
Pos	Team	Pld	W	L	Pts	SW	SL	SR	SPW	SPL	SPR	Qualification
1	China (H)	3	3	0	6	9	0	MAX	225	126	1.786	Semi-finals
2	South Korea	3	2	1	5	6	5	1.200	235	234	1.004	Semi-finals
3	Japan	3	1	2	4	3	7	0.429	201	239	0.841	5th place match
4	Myanmar	3	0	3	3	3	9	0.333	225	287	0.784	7th place match

Source: HAPGOC
(H) Host

23 October 2022; 14:00 UTC+8	China	3–0	Myanmar	Linping Sports Centre Gymnasium
23 October 2022; 14:00 UTC+8	(25–4, 25–12, 25–19); Report			Linping Sports Centre Gymnasium

23 October 2022; 15:30 UTC+8	Japan	0–3	South Korea	Linping Sports Centre Gymnasium
23 October 2022; 15:30 UTC+8	(20–25, 15–25, 23–25); Report			Linping Sports Centre Gymnasium

24 October 2022; 9:00 UTC+8	Myanmar	2–3	South Korea	Linping Sports Centre Gymnasium
24 October 2022; 9:00 UTC+8	(25–23, 20–25, 26–24, 19–25, 11–15); Report			Linping Sports Centre Gymnasium

24 October 2022; 10:30 UTC+8	China	3–0	Japan	Linping Sports Centre Gymnasium
24 October 2022; 10:30 UTC+8	(25–18, 25–13, 25–12); Report			Linping Sports Centre Gymnasium

25 October 2022; 14:00 UTC+8	Japan	3–1	Myanmar	Linping Sports Centre Gymnasium
25 October 2022; 14:00 UTC+8	(25–23, 25–27, 25–16, 25–23); Report			Linping Sports Centre Gymnasium

25 October 2022; 15:30 UTC+8	South Korea	0–3	China	Linping Sports Centre Gymnasium
25 October 2022; 15:30 UTC+8	(19–25, 16–25, 13–25); Report			Linping Sports Centre Gymnasium

===== Group B =====
Pos	Team	Pld	W	L	Pts	SW	SL	SR	SPW	SPL	SPR	Qualification
1	Iran	3	3	0	6	9	0	MAX	225	139	1.619	Semi-finals
2	Kazakhstan	3	2	1	5	6	3	2.000	200	154	1.299	Semi-finals
3	Cambodia	3	1	2	4	3	6	0.500	194	230	0.843	5th place match
4	Thailand	3	0	3	3	1	9	0.111	150	246	0.610	7th place match

Source: HAPGOC

23 October 2022; 17:00 UTC+8	Iran	3–0	Thailand	Linping Sports Centre Gymnasium
23 October 2022; 17:00 UTC+8	(25–12, 25–17, 25–12); Report			Linping Sports Centre Gymnasium

23 October 2022; 19:00 UTC+8	Kazakhstan	3–0	Cambodia	Linping Sports Centre Gymnasium
23 October 2022; 19:00 UTC+8	(25–12, 25–22, 25–16); Report			Linping Sports Centre Gymnasium

24 October 2022; 12:00 UTC+8	Thailand	1–3	Cambodia	Linping Sports Centre Gymnasium
24 October 2022; 12:00 UTC+8	(19–25, 16–25, 25–21, 20–25); Report			Linping Sports Centre Gymnasium

24 October 2022; 14:00 UTC+8	Iran	3–0	Kazakhstan	Linping Sports Centre Gymnasium
24 October 2022; 14:00 UTC+8	(25–10, 25–22, 25–18); Report			Linping Sports Centre Gymnasium

25 October 2022; 17:00 UTC+8	Kazakhstan	3–0	Thailand	Linping Sports Centre Gymnasium
25 October 2022; 17:00 UTC+8	(25–10, 25–7, 25–12); Report			Linping Sports Centre Gymnasium

25 October 2022; 19:00 UTC+8	Cambodia	0–3	Iran	Linping Sports Centre Gymnasium
25 October 2022; 19:00 UTC+8	(14–25, 19–25, 15–25); Report			Linping Sports Centre Gymnasium

==== Final round ====
Semi-finals
26 October – 12:00
China	2
Kazakhstan	3
26 October – 14:00
Iran	3
South Korea	0

Gold medal game
27 October – 15:00
Kazakhstan	0
Iran	3
Bronze medal game
27 October – 13:30
China	3
South Korea	0

5th place match
26 October – 10:30
Japan	1
Cambodia	3
7th place match
26 October – 9:00
Myanmar	0
Thailand	3

===== 7th place match =====
26 October 2022; 9:00 UTC+8	Myanmar	0–3	Thailand	Linping Sports Centre Gymnasium
26 October 2022; 9:00 UTC+8	(22–25, 19–25, 23–25); Report			Linping Sports Centre Gymnasium

===== 5th place match =====
26 October 2022; 10:30 UTC+8	Japan	1–3	Cambodia	Linping Sports Centre Gymnasium
26 October 2022; 10:30 UTC+8	(20–25, 26–24, 18–25, 19–25); Report			Linping Sports Centre Gymnasium

===== Semi-finals =====
26 October 2022; 12:00 UTC+8	China	2–3	Kazakhstan	Linping Sports Centre Gymnasium
26 October 2022; 12:00 UTC+8	(22–25, 13–25, 19–22, 25–16, 25–15); Report			Linping Sports Centre Gymnasium

26 October 2022; 14:00 UTC+8	Iran	3–0	South Korea	Linping Sports Centre Gymnasium
26 October 2022; 14:00 UTC+8	(25–13, 25–19, 25–7); Report			Linping Sports Centre Gymnasium

===== Bronze medal game =====
27 October 2022; 13:30 UTC+8	China	3–0	South Korea	Linping Sports Centre Gymnasium
27 October 2022; 13:30 UTC+8	(25–11, 25–9, 25–13); Report			Linping Sports Centre Gymnasium

===== Gold medal game =====
27 October 2022; 15:00 UTC+8	Kazakhstan	0–3	Iran	Linping Sports Centre Gymnasium
27 October 2022; 15:00 UTC+8	(14–25, 16–25, 18–25); Report			Linping Sports Centre Gymnasium

=== Women's tournament ===
Women's sitting volleyball at the 2022 Asian Para Games
- Dates: 23–27 October 2023
- Nations: 6

Medalists
gold medal	China
silver medal	Iran
bronze medal	Japan

Round Robin – Group C

Pos	Team	Pld	W	L	Pts	SW	SL	SR	SPW	SPL	SPR	Result
1	China (H)	5	5	0	10	9	0	MAX	375	160	2.344	Gold medal
2	Iran	5	4	1	9	12	3	4.000	343	212	1.618	Silver medal
3	Japan	5	3	2	8	9	7	1.286	338	318	1.063	Bronze medal
4	Thailand	5	2	3	7	7	9	0.778	288	347	0.830	
5	Mongolia	5	1	4	6	3	12	0.250	239	359	0.666	
6	South Korea	5	0	5	5	0	15	0.000	189	376	0.503	

Source: HAPGOC
(H) Host

23 October 2022; 9:00 UTC+8	China	3–0	Thailand	Linping Sports Centre Gymnasium
23 October 2022; 9:00 UTC+8	(25–12, 25–14, 25–7); Report			Linping Sports Centre Gymnasium

23 October 2022; 10:30 UTC+8	Japan	3–0	Mongolia	Linping Sports Centre Gymnasium
23 October 2022; 10:30 UTC+8	(25–12, 25–22, 25–21); Report			Linping Sports Centre Gymnasium

23 October 2022; 12:00 UTC+8	Iran	3–0	South Korea	Linping Sports Centre Gymnasium
23 October 2022; 12:00 UTC+8	(25–10, 25–11, 25–6); Report			Linping Sports Centre Gymnasium

24 October 2022; 15:30 UTC+8	Thailand	3–0	South Korea	Linping Sports Centre Gymnasium
24 October 2022; 15:30 UTC+8	(25–13, 25–17, 25–20); Report			Linping Sports Centre Gymnasium

24 October 2022; 17:00 UTC+8	Mongolia	0–3	Iran	Linping Sports Centre Gymnasium
24 October 2022; 17:00 UTC+8	(4–25, 18–25, 6–25); Report			Linping Sports Centre Gymnasium

24 October 2022; 19:00 UTC+8	China	3–0	Japan	Linping Sports Centre Gymnasium
24 October 2022; 19:00 UTC+8	(25–10, 25–17, 25–10); Report			Linping Sports Centre Gymnasium

25 October 2022; 9:00 UTC+8	Japan	3–1	Thailand	Linping Sports Centre Gymnasium
25 October 2022; 9:00 UTC+8	(25–18, 25–16, 22–25, 25–18); Report			Linping Sports Centre Gymnasium

25 October 2022; 10:30 UTC+8	Iran	0–3	China	Linping Sports Centre Gymnasium
25 October 2022; 10:30 UTC+8	(20–25, 13–25, 10–25); Report			Linping Sports Centre Gymnasium

25 October 2022; 12:00 UTC+8	South Korea	0–3	Mongolia	Linping Sports Centre Gymnasium
25 October 2022; 12:00 UTC+8	(24–26, 13–25, 22–25); Report			Linping Sports Centre Gymnasium

26 October 2022; 15:30 UTC+8	Thailand	3–0	Mongolia	Linping Sports Centre Gymnasium
26 October 2022; 15:30 UTC+8	(25–15, 25–15, 25–20)			Linping Sports Centre Gymnasium

26 October 2022; 17:00 UTC+8	China	3–0	South Korea	Linping Sports Centre Gymnasium
26 October 2022; 17:00 UTC+8	(25–10, 25–3, 25–4)			Linping Sports Centre Gymnasium

26 October 2022; 19:00 UTC+8	Japan	0–3	Iran	Linping Sports Centre Gymnasium
26 October 2022; 19:00 UTC+8	(15–25, 22–25, 17–25)			Linping Sports Centre Gymnasium

27 October 2022; 9:00 UTC+8	Iran	3–0	Thailand	Linping Sports Centre Gymnasium
27 October 2022; 9:00 UTC+8	(25–11, 25–10, 25–7)			Linping Sports Centre Gymnasium

27 October 2022; 10:30 UTC+8	South Korea	0–3	Japan	Linping Sports Centre Gymnasium
27 October 2022; 10:30 UTC+8	(15–25, 11–25, 10-25)			Linping Sports Centre Gymnasium

27 October 2022; 12:00 UTC+8	Mongolia	0–3	China	Linping Sports Centre Gymnasium
27 October 2022; 12:00 UTC+8	(10–25, 11–25, 9–25)			Linping Sports Centre Gymnasium

== Final standings ==
Men's tournament
Rank	Team	Pld	W	L
1st place, gold medalist(s)	Iran	5	5	0
2nd place, silver medalist(s)	Kazakhstan	5	3	2
3rd place, bronze medalist(s)	China	5	4	1
4	South Korea	5	4	1
5	Cambodia	4	2	2
6	Japan	4	1	3
7	Thailand	4	1	3
8	Myanmar	4	0	4
Source: HAPGOC

Women's tournament
Rank	Team	Pld	W	L
1st place, gold medalist(s)	China	5	5	0
2nd place, silver medalist(s)	Iran	5	4	1
3rd place, bronze medalist(s)	Japan	5	3	2
4	Thailand	5	2	3
5	Mongolia	5	1	4
6	South Korea	5	0	5
Source: HAPGOC

== Medalists ==
Event	Gold	Silver	Bronze
Men	Iran (IRI): Ghasem Eslami; Morteza Mehrzadselakjani; Pour Meisam Ali; Davoud Alipourian; Movahhed Meysam Hajibabaei; Jamal Nazari; Sadegh Bigdeli; Alireza Poursemnani; Hossein Golestani; Masoud Emami; Ramezan Salehihajikolaei; Mahdi Babadi	Kazakhstan (KAZ): Kuanysh Tazhikov; Rassul Imangaliyev; Bauyrzhan Sartayev; Perdebay Namuratov; Nurtau Mukanbetkaliyev; Berik Izmaganbetov; Zhangali Suieuov; Beket Turniyazov; Yerlan Bitemirov; Shyngys Medeuov; Erik Kaskabayev; Yerbolat Altayev	China (CHN): Xu Zengbing; Wang Qiang; Gao Hui; Wang Shuo; Jia Youming; Ding Jian; Zhao Peiwen; Zhang Zhongmin; Li Lei; Yu Qianyuan; Zhong Xikai; Xie Yiwen
Women	China (CHN): Tang Xuemei; Lyu Hongqin; Su Limei; Hu Huizi; Li Ting; Wang Yanan; Zhang Xufei; Xu Yixiao; Qiu Junfei; Zhao Meiling; Gong Bin; Chen Yalin	Iran (IRI): Barouti Masoumeh Zarei; Dizicheh Zeynab Maleki; Farzaneh Heidari; Farsangi Batoul Khalilzadeh; Daryakenari Mehri Fallahi; Fatemeh Abbasi; Zahra Lotfi; Zahra Nejatiaref; Tayebeh Jafarivardanjani; Zahra Danayetous; Fatemeh Jahani; Mirghaed Hadis Rezaei	Japan (JPN): Michiyo Nishiie; Mika Hata; Mikiko Sumitomo; Junko Fujii; Sachie Akakura; Satoko Kikuchi; Mamiko Osada; Hikari Yoshimoto; Mizuho Fujimoto; Mika Okuda; Kasumi Iihoshi

Source: HAPGOC (Men's and Women's)

== See also ==
- Volleyball at the 2022 Asian Games
