= Athletics at the 2022 Asian Para Games =

Paralympic athletics at the 2022 Asian Para Games
- Venue: Yellow Dragon Sports Center
- Location: Hangzhou, China
- Dates: 23–28 October
- Competitors: 611 from 43 nations

Paralympic athletics at the 2022 Asian Para Games, which was held in Hangzhou, China between 23 and 28 October 2023.

== Medal table ==
* Host nation (China)

Rank	NPC	Gold	Silver	Bronze	Total
1	China (CHN)*	46	43	33	122
2	Iran (IRI)	21	20	10	51
3	India (IND)	18	17	20	55
4	Uzbekistan (UZB)	12	8	10	30
5	Thailand (THA)	10	8	11	29
6	Japan (JPN)	9	12	13	34
7	Indonesia (INA)	5	7	4	16
8	United Arab Emirates (UAE)	3	3	1	7
9	Malaysia (MAS)	3	2	4	9
10	Saudi Arabia (KSA)	2	4	3	9
10	Sri Lanka (SRI)	2	4	3	9
12	Iraq (IRQ)	2	3	3	8
13	Oman (OMA)	2	2	0	4
14	Jordan (JOR)	2	0	0	2
15	South Korea (KOR)	1	3	2	6
16	Philippines (PHI)	1	1	0	2
17	Kazakhstan (KAZ)	1	0	1	2
18	Pakistan (PAK)	1	0	0	1
19	Kyrgyzstan (KGZ)	0	2	1	3
20	Mongolia (MGL)	0	1	1	2
20	Vietnam (VIE)	0	1	1	2
22	Timor-Leste (TLS)	0	1	0	1
23	Myanmar (MYA)	0	0	3	3
24	Chinese Taipei (TPE)	0	0	2	2
24	Hong Kong (HKG)	0	0	2	2
26	Bahrain (BRN)	0	0	1	1
26	Kuwait (KUW)	0	0	1	1
26	Qatar (QAT)	0	0	1	1
26	Syria (SYR)	0	0	1	1
Totals (29 entries)		141	142	132	415

== Medalists ==
Medalists are presented as below:

=== Track ===
Men

Event	Class	Gold		Silver		Bronze	
100 m	T11	Di Dongdong; China	11.23	Zhao Pingan; China	11.33 PB	Ye Tao; China	11.45 PB
100 m	T12	Mehrdad Moradi; Iran	11.17 GR	Eko Saputra; Indonesia	11.22 PB	Daiki Ishiyama; Japan	11.36 PB
100 m	T13	Jakkarin Dammunee; Thailand	11.00 GR	Vahid Alinajimi; Iran	11.27	Doniyorjon Akhmedov; Uzbekistan	11.35 SB
100 m	T34	Chaiwat Rattana; Thailand	15.18 GR	Gong Wenhao; China	15.55	Ali Radi Arshid; Qatar	15.60 PB
100 m	T35	Alireza Zare; Iran	12.74 GR	Idrees Al-Zaidi; Iraq	13.19 PB	Narayan Thakur; India	14.37
100 m	T36	Deng Peicheng; China	11.80 GR	Yang Yifei; China	12.15	Takeru Matsumoto; Japan	12.38
100 m	T37	Saptoyoga Purnomo; Indonesia	11.35 GR	Ali Yousef Al-Nakhli; Saudi Arabia	12.11 SB	Shreyansh Trivedi; India	12.24
100 m	T38	Zhu Dening; China	11.08 GR	Zhou Peng; China	11.24	Zhong Huanghao; China	11.50 SB
100 m	T44	Gamage Maththaka; Sri Lanka	11.63 GR	Eddy Bernard; Malaysia	11.86	Nour Mohammed Asana; Saudi Arabia	12.07 SB
100 m	T47	Wang Hao; China	10.99 SB	Kakeru Ishida; Japan	11.10.096	Nur Ferry Pradana; Indonesia	11.10.099 SB
100 m	T52	Tatsuya Ito; Japan	17.41 GR	Jerrold Mangliwan; Philippines	18.65 PB	Jeong Jong-dae; South Korea	18.67
100 m	T53	Abdulrahman Al-Qurashi; Saudi Arabia	14.56 GR	Pongsakorn Paeyo; Thailand	14.62	Pichet Krungget; Thailand	15.29
100 m	T54	Athiwat Paeng-nuea; Thailand	13.66 GR	Zhang Ying; China	14.41	Jaenal Aripin; Indonesia	14.47 SB
100 m	T63	Partin; Indonesia	12.24 GR	Pedige Yodha; Sri Lanka	12.98	Phalathip Khamta; Thailand	13.12 PB
100 m	T64	Kengo Oshima; Japan	11.27 AR	Shunsuke Itane; Japan	11.49	Pea Soe; Myanmar	11.63
200 m	T35	Alireza Zare; Iran	25.51 AR	Idrees Al-Zaidi; Iraq	26.54 PB	Narayan Thakur; India	29.83
200 m	T37	Saptoyoga Purnomo; Indonesia	23.34 GR	Ali Yousef Al-Nakhli; Saudi Arabia	24.75 SB	Shreyansh Trivedi; India	25.26
200 m	T52	Jeong Jong-dae; South Korea	32.43 GR	Pichaya Kurattanasiri; Thailand	33.69 SB	not awarded	
200 m	T64	Shunsake Itani; Japan	22.99 AR	Kengo Oshima; Japan	23.61 SB	Pea Soe; Myanmar	24.04
400 m	T11	Di Dongdong; China	52.28 GR	Mohammed Ayade; Iraq	52.29 SB	Nguyễn Ngọc Hiệp; Vietnam	56.41
400 m	T12	Mehrdad Moradi; Iran	49.60	Phạm Nguyễn Khánh Minh; Vietnam	50.17 SB	Kissanapong Tisuwan; Thailand	50.49 PB
400 m	T13	Jakkarin Dammunee; Thailand	49.51 GR	Vahid Alinajimi; Iran	50.03 PB	Omid Zarifsanayei; Iran	50.79
400 m	T20	Muhammad Ammar Aiman Nor Azmi; Malaysia	47.60 AR	Alfin Nomleni; Indonesia	49.07 PB	Torkamani Ramazani; Iran	50.43
400 m	T36	Deng Peicheng; China	55.17 AR	Takeru Matsumoto; Japan	56.65	Ahmad Fizzi Rosni; Malaysia	57.19
400 m	T37	Saptoyoga Purnomo; Indonesia	54.80	Apisit Taprom; Thailand	56.63 SB	Thamer Al-Zahrani; Saudi Arabia	57.55
400 m	T38	Ali Al-Rikabi; Iraq	51.15 GR	Reza Hatamishooli; Iran	51.84 PB	Zhou Peng; China	53.09 PB
400 m	T47	Dilip Mahadu Gavit; India	49.48	Nur Ferry Pradana; Indonesia	49.82 PB	Marawaka Subasinghe; Sri Lanka	50.37 SB
400 m	T52	Jerrold Mangliwan; Philippines	1:01.54 PB	Hirokazu Ueyonabaru; Japan	1:01.79 SB	Tatsuya Ito; Japan	1:04.96
400 m	T53	Pongsakorn Paeyo; Thailand	47.53 GR	Yoo Byung-hoon; South Korea	50.69	Abdulrahman Al-Qurashi; Saudi Arabia	51.00 PB
400 m	T54	Athiwat Paeng-nuea; Thailand	44.62 GR	Hu Yang; China	45.05	Dai Yunqiang; China	45.71 PB
400 m	T64	Nour Mohammed Asana; Saudi Arabia	52.81 AR	Ajay Kumar; India	54.85 PB	Jafa Seapla; Thailand	55.09 AR
800 m	T34	Mohamed Alhammadi; United Arab Emirates	1:38.10 GR	Gong Wenhao; China	1:39.22 PB	Wang Yang; China	1:40.36
800 m	T53	Pongsakorn Paeyo; Thailand	1:36.82 GR	Masaberee Arsae; Thailand	1:38.14	Yoo Byung-hoon; South Korea	1:38.36 PB
800 m	T54	Hu Yang; China	1:35.59	Saichon Konjen; Thailand	1:35.98	Prawat Wahoram; Thailand	1:36.13
1500 m	T11	Ankur Dhama; India	4:27.70	Zhalaldin Abduvaliev; Kyrgyzstan	4:30.87	not awarded	
1500 m	T13	Nabeel Maqableh; Jordan	4:07.50 GR	Shankarappa Makanahalli; India	4:13.60	Wong King Yeung; Hong Kong	5:05.83
1500 m	T20	Kenta Okawachi; Japan	4:05.12	Daisuke Nakagawa; Japan	4:06.35	Muhamad Nurdin Ibrahim; Malaysia	4:19.95 SB
1500 m	T38	Raman Sharma; India	4:20.80 AR	Teofilo Freitas; Timor-Leste	4:21.75 AR	Takafumi Igusa; Japan	4:29.42
1500 m	T46	Wahumpurag Puwakpitikande; Sri Lanka	4:05.14 GR	Pramod; India	4:09.25 PB	Rakesh Bhaira; India	4:11.09 SB
1500 m	T54	Prawat Wahoram; Thailand	2:51.03 GR	Putharet Khongrak; Thailand	2:51.08	Hu Yang; China	2:51.10 PB
5000 m	T11	Ankur Dhama; India	16:37.29	Zhalaldin Abduvaliev; Kyrgyzstan	17:18.74	not awarded	
5000 m	T54	Prawat Wahoram; Thailand	10:33.67	Putharet Khongrak; Thailand	10:33.94	Faisal Alrajehi; Kuwait	10:33.95
High jump	T47	Nishad Kumar; India	2.02 GR	Chen Hongjie; China Pal Ram; India	1.94	not awarded	
High jump	T63	Shailesh Kumar; India	1.82 GR	Mariyappan Thangavelu; India	1.80 SB	not awarded	
High jump	T64	Praveen Kumar; India	2.02 GR	Temurbek Giyazov; Uzbekistan	2.00	Unni Renu; India	1.95
Long jump	T11	Di Dongdong; China	6.65 AR	Ye Tao; China	6.37 PB	Urganchbek Egamnazarov; Uzbekistan	6.32 PB
Long jump	T12	Doniyor Saliev; Uzbekistan	7.28 GR	Amir Khosravani; Iran	7.19	Daiki Ishiyama; Japan	6.96 PB
Long jump	T13	Doniyorjon Akhmedov; Uzbekistan	6.88 PB	Mehidi Moradikoochi; Iran	6.22	Wu Nung-pin; Chinese Taipei	6.00 PB
Long jump	T20	Abdul Latif Romly; Malaysia	7.18	Hassan Dawshi; Saudi Arabia	6.80	Zulkifly Abdullah; Malaysia	6.48
Long jump	T36	Yang Yifei; China	5.69 GR	Izzat Turgunov; Uzbekistan	5.55	Deng Peicheng; China	5.17
Long jump	T37/38	Zhu Dening; China	7.15 GR	Zhong Huanghao; China	6.62	Zhou Peng; China	6.28
Long jump	T47	Omadbek Khasanov; Uzbekistan	7.21 PB	Wang Hao; China	6.98	Zhao Yalong; China	6.73 PB
Long jump	T63	Hajime Kondo; Japan	6.16 GR	Partin; Indonesia	5.60 GR	Kantinan Khumphong; Thailand	5.56
Long jump	T64	Solairaj Dharmaraj; India	6.80 AR	Gamage Maththaka; Sri Lanka	6.68 AR	Koto Matayoshi; Japan	6.35

Women

Event	Class	Gold		Silver		Bronze	
100 m	T11	Liu Cuiqing; China	12.00 GR	Zhou Guohua; China	12.26	Suneeporn Tanomwong; Thailand	13.07
100 m	T12	Ni Made Arianti Putri; Indonesia	12.52 GR	Simran; India	12.68	Shen Yaqin; China	12.78
100 m	T13	Liang Yanfen; China	12.92 PB	Mana Sasaki; Japan	13.36	not awarded	
100 m	T34	Lan Hanyu; China	19.32 GR	Haruka Kitaura; Japan	19.93	Moe Onodera; Japan	20.32
100 m	T35	Zhou Xia; China	13.86 GR	Guo Qianqian; China	14.04	Fatimah Suwaed; Iraq	15.10
100 m	T36	Shi Yiting; China	14.56	Jeon Min-jae; South Korea	15.26	Yam Kwok Fan; Hong Kong	15.47 PB
100 m	T37	Wen Xiaoyan; China	12.59 WR	Jiang Fenfen; China	13.29	Aorawan Chimpaen; Thailand	15.41
100 m	T47	Li Lu; China	12.63	Shan Jie; China	12.78	Sasirawan Inthachot; Thailand	12.81 PB
100 m	T54	Zhou Zhaoqian; China	16.07 GR	Luo Shuimei; China	16.35 PB	Tian Yajuan; China	16.37
100 m	T63/64	Saki Takakuwa; Japan	14.11	Karisma Evi Tiarani; Indonesia	14.37 WR	Win Law Lar; Myanmar	15.02
200 m	T11	Liu Cuiqing; China	24.78 SB	Zhou Guohua; China	25.60 SB	Asila Mirzayorova; Uzbekistan	26.55
200 m	T12	Ghahderijani Safarzadeh; Iran	25.87	Simran; India	26.12	Shen Yaqin; China	26.36
200 m	T35	Zhou Xia; China	28.08 GR	Guo Qianqian; China	30.32	Fatimah Suwaed; Iraq	31.94
200 m	T36	Shi Yiting; China	28.17 WR	Jeon Min-jae; South Korea	31.27 SB	Li Sishuang; China	31.95 PB
200 m	T37	Wen Xiaoyan; China	26.18 WR	Jiang Fenfen; China	27.45	Aorawan Chimpaen; Thailand	32.13
200 m	T47	Sasirawan Inthachot; Thailand	25.58 GR	Li Lu; China	25.68 PB	Jiang Yunfei; China	26.42 PB
400 m	T11	Liu Cuiqing; China	56.53 GR	He Shanshan; China	59.86 PB	Asila Mirzayorova; Uzbekistan	1:01.37
400 m	T12	Fatemeh Amirzadegani; Iran	59.88 PB	Shen Yaqin; China	1:00.18 SB	Yokutkhon Kholbekova; Uzbekistan	1:01.01 PB
400 m	T20	Deepthi Jeevanji; India	56.69 AR	Orawan Kaising; Thailand	59.00 PB	Niina Kanno; Japan	59.73 PB
400 m	T37/38	Chen Zimo; China	1:01.71 GR	Jiang Fenfen; China	1:02.29 GR	Yuka Takamatsu; Japan	1:12.80
400 m	T47	Li Lu; China	58.52	Jiang Yunfei; China	58.89 PB	Sae Tsuji; Japan	1:00.95
400 m	T54	Tian Yajuan; China	52.94 GR	Zhou Zhaoqian; China	53.88	Luo Shuimei; China	54.33
800 m	T34	Lan Hanyu; China	2:09.33 AR	Haruka Kitaura; Japan	2:27.80 SB	Liu Panpan; China	3:45.77
800 m	T54	Tian Yajuan; China	1:47.59 GR	Zhou Zhaoqian; China	1:48.15	Luo Shuimei; China	1:48.74
1500 m	T11	Rakshitha Raju; India	5:21.45	Lalitha Killaka; India	5:48.85	Gulnaz Zhuzbaeva; Kyrgyzstan	6:31.22
1500 m	T20	Moeko Yamamoto; Japan	4:56.60	Misaki Ari; Japan	5:24.57	Pooja; India	5:38.81
1500 m	T54	Zhou Zhaoqian; China	3:31.43 GR	Tian Yajuan; China	3:31.45	Luo Shuimei; China	3:31.91
Long jump	T11/12	Asila Mirazayorova; Uzbekistan	5.24 AR 1027	Zhou Guohua; China	5.11 994	Yokutkhon Kholbekova; Uzbekistan	5.64 GR 884
Long jump	T20	Sonomi Sakai; Japan	5.37 GR	Rio Kawaguchi; Japan	5.32	Rica Oktavia; Indonesia	5.14
Long jump	T37/38	Wen Xiaoyan; China	5.45 WR	Chen Zimo; China	4.99 GR	Aorawan Chimpaen; Thailand	3.58
Long jump	T47	Suresh Chakkungalparambil; India	5.15 GR	Arachchcig Wickramasingha; Sri Lanka	4.89 GR	Mudiyanselage Dissanayaka; Sri Lanka	4.76

Mixed

Event	Class	Gold		Silver		Bronze	
4 × 100 m relay	Universal	China (CHN); Zhou Guohua; Wang Hao; Wen Xiaoyan; Hu Yang	45.78 AR	Indonesia (INA); Ni Made Arianti Putri; Nanda Mei Sholihah; Saptoyogo Purnomo; Jaenal Aripin	47.23 NR	Japan (JPN); Uran Sawada; Yuya Sambongi; Yuka Takamatsu; Tomoki Ikoma	48.15

=== Field ===
Men

Event	Class	Gold		Silver		Bronze	
Shot put	F11	Darbeid Al-Ipour; Iran	13.92 SB	Mahdi Olad; Iran	13.30	Monu Ghangas; India	12.33 SB
Shot put	F12	Saman Pakbaz; Iran	16.15 GR	Elbek Sultonov; Uzbekistan	15.37	Ali Shamshiri; Iran	14.14
Shot put	F20	Muhammad Ziyad Zolkefli; Malaysia	16.65	Mohamad Aliff Awi; Malaysia	13.75 PB	Boonkong Sanepoot; Thailand	13.67 PB
Shot put	F32	Mohammed Jamil Al-Mashaykhi; Oman	8.33 SB	Mohammed Harith Al-Qasmi; Oman	7.34	no awarded	
Shot put	F33	Cai Bingchen; China	12.03 AR	Hani Alnakhli; Saudi Arabia	10.53	Liu Li; China	9.70
Shot put	F34	Ahmad Hindi; Jordan	11.93	Hadi Kaeidi; Iran	11.04	Zhang Zhongqiang; China	10.41
Shot put	F35	Seyed Javanmardi; Iran	16.17 SB	Fu Xinhan; China	15.96 SB	Khusniddin Norbekov; Uzbekistan	15.90
Shot put	F36	Dastan Mukashbekov; Kazakhstan	15.74 AR	Mohammed Saeed Al-Kaabi; United Arab Emirates	12.99	Ivan Zaleznyak; Kazakhstan	12.39
Shot put	F37	Kudratillokhon Marufkhujaev; Uzbekistan	14.89 PB	Tolibboy Yuldashev; Uzbekistan	14.09	Manu; India	14.09 PB
Shot put	F40	Garrah Tnaiash; Iraq	10.80	Ravi Rongali; India	9.92 PB	Battulga Tsegmid; Mongolia	9.74 PB
Shot put	F41	Bobirjon Omonov; Uzbekistan	13.14 GR	Xia Zhiwei; China	11.36 SB	Sun Pengxiang; China	10.61
Shot put	F46	Sachin Sarjerao Khilari; India	16.03 GR	Wei Enlong; China	14.93 SB	Rohit Kumar; India	14.56 PB
Shot put	F53	Rashid Masjedi; Iran	8.73 AR	Alireza Mokhtari; Iran	8.59 SB	Alaa Abdulsalam; Syria	7.87 PB
Shot put	F55	Hamed Amiri; Iran	11.27	Zafar Zaker; Iran	11.16	Muthuraja; India	10.42
Shot put	F57	Yasin Khosravi; Iran	16.00 GR	Soman Rana; India	14.42	Hotozhe Sema; India	13.94 PB
Shot put	F63	Mukhammad Rikhsimov; Uzbekistan	14.52 PB	Sajad Mohammadian; Iran	14.27	Gedara Halgahawela; Sri Lanka	14.15 PB
Discus throw	F11	Mahdi Olad; Iran	42.73 GR	Monu Ghangas; India	37.87 PB	Hassan Bajoulvand; Iran	37.62
Discus throw	F37	Haider Ali; Pakistan	51.23	Yamato Shimbo; Japan	49.70	Zhang Xuelong; China	48.26
Discus throw	F51/52/53	Alireza Mokhtari; Iran	22.38 858	Asadollah Azimi; Iran	21.57 818	Rashid Masjedi; Iran	20.71 PB 772
Discus throw	F54/55/56	Neeraj Yadav; India	38.56 AR 1014	Yogesh Kathuniya; India	42.13 946	Muthuraja; India	35.06 935
Javelin throw	F13	Ali Pirouj; Iran	63.73	Sajad Nikparast; Iran	62.92	Yuta Wakoh; Japan	57.44
Javelin throw	F33/34	Saeid Afrooz; Iran	40.18 GR 1068	Moein Erfan Rezaei; Iran	27.07 WR 1057	Cai Bingchen; China	25.51 1017
Javelin throw	F37/38	Haney Haney; India	55.97 GR 1082	Hormoz Seidikazpounji; Iran	48.47 SB 979	An Dongquan; China	52.52 AR 936
Javelin throw	F41	Sun Pengxiang; China	48.46 WR	Sadegh Beit Sayah; Iran	45.20	Wildan Nukhailawi; Iraq	42.87 SB
Javelin throw	F46	Sundar Singh Gurjar; India	68.60 WR	Rinku; India	67.08	Singh Ajeet; India	63.52
Javelin throw	F54	Deraznoei Erfan Bondori; Iran	28.28 GR	Pradeep Kumar; India	25.94 PB	Laxit; India	21.20 PB
Javelin throw	F55	Neeraj Yadav; India	33.69 GR	Zafar Zaker; Iran	33.58 PB	Chand Tek; India	30.36 PB
Javelin throw	F57	Amanolah Papi; Iran	49.24 GR	Yorkinbek Odilov; Uzbekistan	47.72	Fauzi Purwolaksono; Indonesia	44.69 PB
Javelin throw	F64	Sumit Antil; India	73.29 WR	Arachchige Kodithuwakku; Sri Lanka	64.09 GR	Pushpendra Singh; India	62.06
Club throw	F32	Mohammed Jamil Al-Mashaykhi; Oman	27.78	Mohammed Harith Al-Qasmi; Oman	27.33	no awarded	
Club throw	F51	Pranav Soorma; India	30.01 GR	Dharambir; India	28.76	Amit Kumar; India	26.93

Women

Event	Class	Gold		Silver		Bronze	
Shot put	F11/12	Safiya Burkhanova; Uzbekistan	13.87 SB 998	Zhao Yuping; China	12.73 915	Xue Enhui; China	11.21 SB 676
Shot put	F20	Rerina Hori; Japan	11.93 AR	Supami Yati; Indonesia	11.12	Noor Imanina Idris; Malaysia	11.08
Shot put	F32	Noura Khalifa Al-Ketbi; United Arab Emirates	5.94	Parastoo Habibi; Iran	5.49 PB	Thekra Ahmed Al-Kaabi; United Arab Emirates	4.11
Shot put	F33	Qian Zao; China	6.71 AR	Ha Atena Mohammadi; Iran	6.10	Batoul Jahangiri; Iran	5.99
Shot put	F34	Zou Lijuan; China	9.14 GR	Bhagyashree Jadhav; India	7.54	Moghadam Moradi; Iran	6.71 PB
Shot put	F35/36/37	Li Yingli; China	13.82 AR 1089	Mi Na; China	13.12 SB 1057	Wang Jun; China	11.15 GR 930
Shot put	F41	Kubaro Khakimova; Uzbekistan	9.64 GR	Maryam Al-Zeyoudi; United Arab Emirates	8.49 AR	Li Wei; China	7.78
Shot put	F46	Huang Tiantian; China	10.95 SB	Shi Gating; China	10.13	Zhang Jiamin; China	10.13
Shot put	F54	Elham Salehi; Iran	7.36	Nurkhon Kurbanova; Uzbekistan	7.34	Yang Liwan; China	7.19 SB
Shot put	F57	Xu Mian; China	11.06 AR	Tian Yuxin; China	10.20	Mokhigul Khamdamova; Uzbekistan	9.31 PB
Shot put	F64	Yao Juan; China	11.40	Yang Yue; China	10.52 SB	Leila Kabgzan; Iran	10.00 PB
Discus throw	F11	Zhang Liangmin; China	40.12	Xue Enhui; China	39.76	Shahnozahon Adhamova; Uzbekistan	27.08
Discus throw	F37/38	Mi Na; China	38.73 WR 1080	Li Yingli; China	37.04 SB 1052	Lakshmi; India	22.55 PB 505
Discus throw	F40/41	Maryam Al-Zeyoudi; United Arab Emirates	21.97 AR 913	Saruultugs Dagvadorj; Mongolia	20.79 SB 853	Madina Mukhtorova; Uzbekistan	19.55 PB 781
Discus throw	F51/52/53	Aghdas Elnaz Darabian; Iran	14.25 AR 1045	Omeir Hanan Kaab; Iran	11.55 868	Keiko Onidani; Japan	11.01 818
Discus throw	F54/55	Dong Feixia; China	26.35 GR 1021	Pooja; India	18.17 PB 976	Yang Liwan; China	17.15 SB 944
Discus throw	F56/57	Mokhigul Khamdamova; Uzbekistan	31.64 GR 968	Faezeh Dibaei; Iran	22.98 GR 966	Xu Mian; China	31.02 951
Discus throw	F64	Yao Juan; China	40.17	Yang Yue; China	38.37 SB	Vajiheh Houshmand; Iran	28.92 WR
Javelin throw	F12/13	Zhao Yuping; China	45.69 GR	Nozimakhon Kayumova; Uzbekistan	43.36 SB	Liu Ya-ting; Chinese Taipei	33.40 SB
Javelin throw	F34	Zou Lijuan; China	21.59 SB	Zuo Caiyun; China	18.24 PB	Qian Zao; China	16.37 AR
Javelin throw	F46	Shahinakhon Yigitalieva; Uzbekistan	40.90 GR	Shi Gaiting; China	36.93 PB	Huang Yezi; China	36.03
Javelin throw	F54	Nurkhon Kurbanova; Uzbekistan	18.95 GR	Yang Liwan; China	18.53	Elham Salehi; Iran	16.91
Javelin throw	F56	Lin Sitong; China	21.53 GR	Natalya Semyonova; Uzbekistan	17.40 SB	Rooba Yusuf Al-Moari; Bahrain	17.26 SB
Club throw	F32/51	Parastoo Habibi; Iran	22.88 AR 934	Thekra Ahmed Al-Kaabi; United Arab Emirates	21.26 857	Ekta Bhyan; India	21.66 AR 932

== No medal events ==
Men

Event	Class	First place		Second place		Third place		Report
5000 m	T13	Shankarappa Makanahalli; India	20:18.90	Nabeel Maqableh; Jordan	20:18.91	—N/a		Report
Discus throw	F64	Kumar Devender; India	49.72	Pradeep; India	46.41 SB	Sourav; India	43.75	Report

Women

Event	Class	First place		Second place		Report
100 m	T38	Chen Zimo; China	13.04 GR	—N/a		Report
100 m	T53	Gao Fong; China	16.36 GR	Zhou Hongzhuan; China	17.01	Report
400 m	T13	Mana Sasaki; Japan	59.81 GR	Liang Yanfen; China	1:07.22	Report
400 m	T53	Zhou Hongzhuan; China	54.65 GR	Gao Fang; China	55.83	Report
800 m	T53	Zhou Hongzhuan; China	1:49.51 GR	Gao Fang; China	1:52.17 PB	Report
1500 m	T13	Venkatesh Radha; India	5:19.35	Esmaell Pour; Iran	5:24.98	Report
5000 m	T54	Tian Yajuan; China	12:03.09	Maria Yati; Indonesia	12:09.24	Report
Long jump	T42/44/61/64	Saki Takakuwa; Japan	4.79	Karisma Evi Tiarani; Indonesia	4.16 WR	Report

== Nations ==
611 players from 43 nations participate this event.

1. Afghanistan (1)
2. Bahrain (5)
3. Bangladesh (3)
4. Bhutan (1)
5. Brunei (1)
6. Cambodia (1)
7. China (76)
8. Hong Kong (14)
9. India (123)
10. Indonesia (22)
11. Iran (52)
12. Iraq (10)
13. Japan (45)
14. Jordan (2)
15. Kazakhstan (17)
16. South Korea (11)
17. Kuwait (6)
18. Kyrgyzstan (6)
19. Laos (2)
20. Lebanon (1)
21. Macau (3)
22. Malaysia (16)
23. Maldives (2)
24. Mongolia (9)
25. Nepal (2)
26. Myanmar (4)
27. Oman (6)
28. Pakistan (2)
29. Philippines (9)
30. Palestine (5)
31. Qatar (4)
32. Saudi Arabia (12)
33. Singapore (9)
34. Sri Lanka (15)
35. Syria (3)
36. Chinese Taipei (7)
37. Tajikistan (1)
38. Thailand (45)
39. Timor-Leste (4)
40. United Arab Emirates (19)
41. Uzbekistan (36)
42. Vietnam (10)
43. Yemen (2)

== See also ==
- Athletics at the 2023 ASEAN Para Games
- Athletics at the 2022 Asian Games
