= Wang Xixi =

Chinese rower

Personal information
- Born: 21 May 1993 (age 33) Taizhou, Zhejiang Province, China

Sport
- Sport: Adaptive rowing
Medal record
Representing China
World Championships
Silver medal – second place	2025 Shanghai	PR3 Mixed coxed four
Asian Para Games
Gold medal – first place	2022 Hangzhou	PR3 Mixed coxed four
Gold medal – first place	2022 Hangzhou	PR3 Mixed double sculls

Wang Xixi (born 21 May 1995) is a Chinese Paralympic rower who competes in international rowing competitions. She is a World silver medalist, double Asian Para Games champion and has competed at the 2024 Summer Paralympics.
