= Yuji Taguchi =

Japanese goalball player (born 1991)

Personal information
- Nationality: Japanese
- Born: February 16, 1991 (age 35) Mihara, Hiroshima, Japan

Sport
- Sport: Goalball
Medal record
Representing Japan
Summer Paralympics
Gold medal – first place	2024 Paris	Men's
Asian Para Games
Silver medal – second place	2022 Hangzhou	Men's

Yuji Taguchi (田口侑治, Taguchi Yuji; born February 16, 1991) is a Japanese goalball player and a member of Japanese men's national team.

Taguchi was a part of the Japan roster in the men's goalball tournament of the 2020 Summer Paralympics. He was on the team that won silver in the men's tournament, at the 2022 Asian Para Games. Taguchi was on the team that won gold in the men's tournament, at the 2024 Summer Paralympics.
