= Japan at the 2022 Asian Para Games =

- IPC code: JPN
- NPC: Japanese Paralympic Committee

in Hangzhou 22-28 October 2023
- Competitors: 259 in 20 sports
- Flag bearer: Mika Hata
- Medals Ranked 3rd: Gold 42 Silver 49 Bronze 59 Total 150

Asian Para Games appearances (overview)
- 2010; 2014; 2018; 2022; 2026

Japan participated at the 2022 Asian Para Games in Hangzhou, China from 22 to 28 October 2023. Originally scheduled to take place from 9 to 15 October 2022, the event was postponed to 2023 on 17 May 2022 due to the COVID-19 pandemic. Japan sent 259 athletes to the game, consisting of 153 men and 106 women, and competed in 20 out of 22 events, excepting only chess and go. Japanese athletes won a total of 150 medals, consisted of 42 gold medals, 49 silver medals and 59 bronze medals. They finished third at the medal table after China and Iran.

The Japanese team entered the opening ceremony in twelfth place, and were led into the stadium by flag bearer, women’s seated volleyball player Mika Hata. The closing ceremony flag-bearer for the Japanese delegation was Aira Kinoshita, who won three gold medals and two silver medals in swimming events at the games.

== Medalists ==
The following Japan competitors won medals at the Games.

Medal	Name	Sport	Event	Date
Gold	Reina Hori	Athletics	Women's shot put F20	23 October
Gold	Shunsuke Itani	Athletics	Men's 200 m T64	23 October
Gold	Aira Kinoshita	Swimming	Women's 200 m freestyle S14	23 October
Gold	Tatsuya Ito	Athletics	Men's 100 m T52	24 October
Gold	Junko Hirose	Judo	Women's -57 kg	24 October
Gold	Takayuki Suzuki	Swimming	Men's 100 m freestyle S4	24 October
Gold	Uchu Tomita	Swimming	Men's 400 m freestyle S11	24 October
Gold	Naohide Yamaguchi	Swimming	Men's 100 m backstroke S14	24 October
Gold	Akito Minai	Swimming	Men's 200 m individual medley SM10	24 October
Gold	Kota Kubota	Swimming	Men's 100 m backstroke S8	24 October
Gold	Keiichi Kimura	Swimming	Men's 100 m butterfly S11	24 October
Gold	Naohide Yamaguchi; Aira Kinoshita; Mami Inoue; Keichi Nakajima	Swimming	Mixed 4 × 100 m freestyle relay S14	24 October
Gold	Shota Kawamoto	Cycling	Men's 3000 m individual pursuit C2	25 October
Gold	Masaki Fujita	Cycling	Men's 3000 m individual pursuit C3	25 October
Gold	Natsuki Wada	Table tennis	Women's singles Class 11	25 October
Gold	Katsuyoshi Yagi	Table tennis	Men's singles Class 7	25 October
Gold	Daisuke Ishito; Koji Sugeno	Wheelchair tennis	Quad doubles	25 October
Gold	Yui Kamiji; Manami Tanaka	Wheelchair tennis	Women's doubles	25 October
Gold	Naohide Yamaguchi	Swimming	Men's 100 m breaststroke SB14	25 October
Gold	Mikika Serizawa	Swimming	Women's 100 m breaststroke SB14	25 October
Gold	Sonomi Sakai	Athletics	Women's long jump T20	26 October
Gold	Koji Sugeno	Wheelchair tennis	Quad singles	26 October
Gold	Yui Kamiji	Wheelchair tennis	Women's singles	26 October
Gold	Kengo Oshima	Athletics	Men's 100 m T64	26 October
Gold	Saki Takakuwa	Athletics	Women's 100 m T63/64	26 October
Gold	Masaki Fujita	Cycling	Men's time trial C1-3	26 October
Gold	Uchu Tomita	Swimming	Men's 200 m individual medley SM11	26 October
Gold	Anku Matsuda	Swimming	Men's 100 m butterfly S14	26 October
Gold	Sarina Satomi	Badminton	Women's singles WH1	26 October
Gold	Kanon Fukuda	Swimming	Women's 100 m breaststroke SB8	26 October
Gold	Daiki Kajiwara	Badminton	Men's singles WH2	27 October
Gold	Tokito Oda	Wheelchair tennis	Men's singles	27 October
Gold	Hiroaki Kozai; Koki Maruyama; Ryohei Miyamoto; Naohiro Murakami; Yoshinobu Takamatsu; Ryuga Akaishi; Kei Akita; Renshi Chokai; Takuya Furusawa; Shota Horiuchi; Akinobu Ito; Rin Kawahara	Wheelchair basketball	Men's tournament	27 October
Gold	Naohide Yamaguchi	Swimming	Men's 200 m individual medley SM14	27 October
Gold	Aira Kinoshita	Swimming	Women's 200 m individual medley SM14	27 October
Gold	An Nishida	Swimming	Women's 50 m butterfly S7	27 October
Gold	Akito Minai	Swimming	Men's 400 m freestyle S9	27 October
Gold	Takayuki Suzuki	Swimming	Men's 50 m freestyle S4	27 October
Gold	Taiyo Kawabuchi	Swimming	Men's 100 m butterfly S10	27 October
Gold	Hajime Kondo	Athletics	Men's long jump T63	28 October
Gold	Kenta Okawachi	Athletics	Men's 1500 m T20	28 October
Gold	Moeko Yamamoto	Athletics	Women's 1500 m T20	28 October
Silver	Monika Seryu	Canoeing	Women's KL1	23 October
Silver	Kengo Oshima	Athletics	Men's 200 m T64	23 October
Silver	Mana Sasaki	Athletics	Women's 100 m T13	23 October
Silver	Keiko Sugiura	Cycling	Women's 3000 m individual pursuit C1-3	23 October
Silver	Shizuka Hangai	Judo	Women's -48 kg	23 October
Silver	Keiichi Kimura	Swimming	Men's 50 m freestyle S11	23 October
Silver	Mitsuya Tanaka	Taekwondo	Men's -58 kg K44	23 October
Silver	Haruka Kitaura	Athletics	Women's 800 m T34	24 October
Silver	Minako Tsuchiya	Judo	Women's -70 kg	24 October
Silver	Genki Saito	Swimming	Men's 400 m freestyle S13	24 October
Silver	Aira Kinoshita	Swimming	Women's 100 m backstroke S14	24 October
Silver	Taiyo Kawabuchi	Swimming	Men's 200 m individual medley SM9	24 October
Silver	Uchu Tomita	Swimming	Men's 100 m butterfly S11	24 October
Silver	Takeru Matsumoto	Athletics	Men's 400 m T36	25 October
Silver	Koyo Iwabuchi	Table tennis	Men's singles Class 9	25 October
Silver	Mahiro Funayama	Table tennis	Men's singles Class 10	25 October
Silver	Takeshi Takemori	Table tennis	Men's singles Class 11	25 October
Silver	Yuri Tomono	Table tennis	Women's singles Class 8	25 October
Silver	Keiichi Kimura	Swimming	Men's 100 m breaststroke SB11	25 October
Silver	Eigo Tanaka; Takayuki Suzuki; Mami Inoue; Keichi Nakajima	Swimming	Mixed 4 × 50 m medley relay 20 points	25 October
Silver	Akito Minai	Swimming	Men's 100 m freestyle S10	25 October
Silver	Yamato Shimbo	Athletics	Men's discus throw F37	26 October
Silver	Haruka Kitaura	Athletics	Women's 100 m T34	26 October
Silver	Rio Kawaguchi	Athletics	Women's long jump T20	26 October
Silver	Daisuke Ishito	Wheelchair tennis	Quad singles	26 October
Silver	Kakeru Ishida	Athletics	Men's 100 m T47	26 October
Silver	Shunsuke Itani	Athletics	Men's 100 m T64	26 October
Silver	Keiichi Kimura	Swimming	Men's 200 m individual medley SM11	26 October
Silver	Aira Kinoshita	Swimming	Women's 100 m butterfly S14	26 October
Silver	Onta Uezono	Swimming	Men's 100 m backstroke S10	26 October
Silver	Mikuni Utsugi	Swimming	Women's 100 m breaststroke SB8	26 October
Silver	Kota Kubota; Mikuni Utsugi; Taiyo Kawabuchi; Kanon Fukuda	Swimming	Mixed 4 × 100 m medley relay 34 points	26 October
Silver	Mayo Hagino; Mari Amimoto; Mayumi Tsuchida; Chihiro Kitada; Miho Otsu; Chinami Shimizu; Hotaru Tatsuoka; Kotone Usui; Amane Yanagimoto; Izumi Zaima; Chihiro Furuya; Yui Ishikawa	Wheelchair basketball	Women's tournament	26 October
Silver	Hirokazu Ueyonabaru	Athletics	Men's 400 m T52	27 October
Silver	Tomohiro Ueyama	Archery	Men's recurve individual	27 October
Silver	Kazuya Kaneko; Yuto Sano; Yuta Kawashima; Koji Miyajiki; Yuji Taguchi; Haruki Torii	Goalball	Men's tournament	27 October
Silver	Eiko Kakehata; Masae Komiya; Yuki Temma; Minami Arai; Rieko Takahashi; Norika Hagiwara	Goalball	Women's tournament	27 October
Silver	Sarina Satomi; Yuma Yamazaki	Badminton	Women's doubles WH1-WH2	27 October
Silver	Takashi Sanada	Wheelchair tennis	Men's singles	27 October
Silver	Uchu Tomita	Swimming	Men's 100 m freestyle S12	27 October
Silver	Daiki Kubo	Swimming	Men's 100 m butterfly S10	27 October
Silver	Mikuni Utsugi	Swimming	Women's 100 m backstroke S9	27 October
Silver	Genki Saito	Swimming	Men's 200 m individual medley SM13	27 October
Silver	Kotaro Ogiwara; Kota Kubota; Kanon Fukuda; Mikuni Utsugi	Swimming	Mixed 4 × 100 m freestyle relay 34 points	27 October
Silver	Daisuke Nakagawa	Athletics	Men's 1500 m T20	28 October
Silver	Kohji Oyama	Archery	Men's open W1	28 October
Silver	Misaki Ari	Athletics	Women's 1500 m T20	28 October
Silver	Takeshi Takemori; Koya Kato	Table tennis	Men's doubles Class 22	28 October
Silver	Koyo Iwabuchi; Hayuma Abe	Table tennis	Men's doubles Class 18	28 October
Silver	Kanami Furukawa; Maki Ito	Table tennis	Women's doubles Class 22	28 October
Bronze	Saki Komatsu	Canoeing	Women's VL2	23 October
Bronze	Hiromi Tatsumi	Canoeing	Men's KL2	23 October
Bronze	Yuka Takamatsu	Athletics	Women's 400 m T37/38	23 October
Bronze	Keiko Onidani	Athletics	Women's discus throw F53	23 October
Bronze	Tomomi Ishiura	Swimming	Women's 50 m freestyle S11	23 October
Bronze	Ema Maeda	Swimming	Women's 100 m breaststroke SB9	23 October
Bronze	Mami Inoue	Swimming	Women's 200 m freestyle S14	23 October
Bronze	Tae Kawabe	Swimming	Women's 50 m freestyle S10	23 October
Bronze	Akito Minai	Swimming	Men's 50 m freestyle S10	23 October
Bronze	Daiki Ishiyama	Athletics	Men's 100 m T12	24 October
Bronze	Niina Kanno	Athletics	Women's 400 m T20	24 October
Bronze	Daiki Ishiyama	Athletics	Men's long jump T12	24 October
Bronze	Shota Kawamoto	Cycling	Men's 1000 m time trial C1-3	24 October
Bronze	Keiko Sugiura	Cycling	Women's 500 m time trial C1-3	24 October
Bronze	Yujiro Seto	Judo	Men's -73 kg	24 October
Bronze	Shunsuke Kudo	Taekwondo	Men's -70 kg K44	24 October
Bronze	Maori Yui	Swimming	Women's 200 m freestyle S5	24 October
Bronze	Yuta Wakoh	Athletics	Men's javelin throw F13	24 October
Bronze	Kanon Fukuda	Swimming	Women's 200 m individual medley SM9	24 October
Bronze	Kotaro Ogiwara	Swimming	Men's 100 m backstroke S8	24 October
Bronze	Masayuki Arita	Boccia	Men's individual BC3	25 October
Bronze	Anri Sakurai	Wheelchair fencing	Women's individual épée	25 October
Bronze	Kazuki Shichino	Table tennis	Men's singles Class 4	25 October
Bronze	Takuro Chihara	Table tennis	Men's singles Class 6	25 October
Bronze	Nozomi Nakamura	Table tennis	Women's singles Class 10	25 October
Bronze	Kanami Furukawa	Table tennis	Women's singles Class 11	25 October
Bronze	Yuto Sato	Swimming	Men's 100 m breaststroke SB14	25 October
Bronze	Taiyo Kawabuchi	Swimming	Men's 100 m butterfly S9	25 October
Bronze	Moe Onodera	Athletics	Women's 100 m T34	26 October
Bronze	Daisuke Fujihara	Badminton	Men's singles SL3	26 October
Bronze	Genki Saito	Swimming	Men's 100 m backstroke S13	26 October
Bronze	Kotone Matsunaga	Swimming	Women's 100 m backstroke S10	26 October
Bronze	Chika Shigesada; Tomohiro Ueyama	Archery	Mixed team recurve	26 October
Bronze	Takuya Miki; Takashi Sanada	Wheelchair tennis	Men's doubles	26 October
Bronze	Mamiko Toyoda	Badminton	Women's singles SU5	26 October
Bronze	Keiko Sugiura	Cycling	Women's time trial C1-3	26 October
Bronze	Shota Kawamoto	Cycling	Men's time trial C1-3	26 October
Bronze	Kanon Fukuda	Swimming	Women's 100 m freestyle S9	26 October
Bronze	Michinobu Fujita; Shintaro Kano; Naoki Yasu; Akira Tsunoda	Wheelchair fencing	Men's team foil	26 October
Bronze	Keichi Nakajima	Swimming	Men's 100 m butterfly S14	26 October
Bronze	Mami Inoue	Swimming	Women's 100 m butterfly S14	26 October
Bronze	Takeru Matsumoto	Athletics	Men's 100 m T36	27 October
Bronze	Takafumi Igusa	Athletics	Men's 1500 m T38	27 October
Bronze	Koto Matayoshi	Athletics	Men's long jump T64	27 October
Bronze	Mamiko Toyoda	Badminton	Women's singles SU5	27 October
Bronze	Daisuke Fujihara	Badminton	Men's singles SL3	27 October
Bronze	Masaki Fujita	Cycling	Men's road race C1-3	27 October
Bronze	Mika Mizuta	Shooting	Mixed 10 m air rifle prone SH2	27 October
Bronze	Genki Saito; Kazuki Shichino	Table tennis	Men's doubles Class 8	27 October
Bronze	Nozomi Nakamura; Yuri Tomono	Table tennis	Women's doubles Class 20	27 October
Bronze	Kanami Furukawa; Takashi Asano	Table tennis	Mixed doubles Class 22	27 October
Bronze	Sachie Akakura; Junko Fujii; Mika Hata; Hikari Yoshimoto; Satoko Kikuchi; Michiyo Nishiie; Mizuho Fujimoto; Mamiko Osada; Kasumi Iihoshi; Mikiko Sumitomo; Mika Okuda	Sitting volleyball	Women's tournament	27 October
Bronze	Takuya Miki	Wheelchair tennis	Men's singles	27 October
Bronze	Keichi Nakajima	Swimming	Men's 200 m individual medley SM14	27 October
Bronze	Manami Urata	Swimming	Women's 400 m freestyle S9	27 October
Bronze	Ema Maeda	Swimming	Women's 100 m backstroke S9	27 October
Bronze	Tae Kawabe	Swimming	Women's 100 m butterfly S10	27 October
Bronze	Sae Tsuji	Athletics	Women's 400 m T47	28 October
Bronze	Uran Sawada; Yuya Sambongi; Yuka Takamatsu; Tomoki Ikoma	Athletics	4 × 100 m universal relay	28 October
Bronze	Takuya Mori	Rowing	Men's single sculls PR1	28 October

== Medal summary ==
=== Medals by sport ===
Medals by sport
Sport	1st place, gold medalist(s)	2nd place, silver medalist(s)	3rd place, bronze medalist(s)	Total
Swimming	19	18	19	56
Athletics	9	12	12	33
Wheelchair tennis	5	2	2	9
Cycling	3	1	5	9
Table tennis	2	7	7	16
Badminton	2	1	4	7
Judo	1	2	1	4
Wheelchair basketball	1	1	0	2
Archery	0	2	1	3
Goalball	0	2	0	2
Canoeing	0	1	2	3
Taekwondo	0	1	1	2
Wheelchair fencing	0	0	2	2
Boccia	0	0	1	1
Rowing	0	0	1	1
Shooting	0	0	1	1
Sitting volleyball	0	0	1	1
Total	42	49	59	150

=== Medals by day ===
Medals by day
Day	Date	1st place, gold medalist(s)	2nd place, silver medalist(s)	3rd place, bronze medalist(s)	Total
1	October 23	3	7	9	19
2	October 24	9	6	11	26
3	October 25	8	8	8	24
4	October 26	10	12	13	35
5	October 27	9	11	16	36
6	October 28	3	6	3	12
Total		42	49	59	150

== Competitors ==
Sport	Men	Women	Total
Archery	4	1	5
Athletics	27	18	45
Badminton	7	8	15
Blind football	8	—N/a	8
Boccia	4	5	9
Canoeing	4	4	8
Cycling	2	1	3
Goalball	6	6	12
Judo	5	7	12
Lawn bowls	1	1	2
Powerlifting	7	1	8
Rowing	3	3	6
Shooting	2	2	4
Sitting volleyball	8	11	19
Swimming	26	17	43
Table tennis	14	5	19
Taekwondo	4	—N/a	4
Wheelchair basketball	12	12	24
Wheelchair fencing	4	1	5
Wheelchair tennis	5	3	8
Total	153	106	259

== Background ==
=== Qualification for Paris ===
The games were seen as especially important for some Japanese athletes, such as the wheelchair tennis players, since winning gold medals in these games secured those athletes a place in the 2024 Paris Paralympics. In the event, Japan dominated the wheelchair tennis, winning a clean sweep in the men’s singles, Tokito Oda taking gold, Takashi Sanada taking silver, and Takuya Miki taking bronze. With his gold, Oda won the coveted Paris spot. Japan also won gold in the women’s singles, quad singles, and all three women’s, men’s and quad doubles golds, with Yui Kamiji gaining a Paris qualifying spot with her women’s singles win.

Other athletes securing Paris qualifying spots included Mika Mizuta for SH2 R5 mixed 10m prone air rifle, and Kazuya Okada for SH1 R3 mixed 10m prone air rifle, as well as Katsuyoshi Yagi for men’s class 7 table tennis, and Natsuki Wada for women’s class 11 table tennis.

=== Records ===
Keigo Oshima set a new Asian record in the men’s 100m (T64) sprint with a time of 11.27 seconds.

Reina Hori set a new Asian record for women’s shot put (F20) with a distance of 11 meters and 93 centimeters.

The mixed 4x100m swimming relay team set a new Asian record with a time of 3 minutes and 53.63 seconds.

Keiko Sugiura set two new Asian Para Games records, a new record in the women’s C3 class 3000 m individual pursuit, and a new record of 39.995 seconds in the women’s C3 class 500 m time trial.

== See also ==
- Japan at the 2022 Asian Games
