= Canoeing at the 2022 Asian Para Games =

- Location: Hangzhou, China
- Dates: 23–24 October

Canoeing at the 2022 Asian Para Games was held in Hangzhou, China in October 2023.

== Nations ==
53 from 9 nations.

1. China (8)
2. India (10)
3. Iran (6)
4. Japan (8)
5. Kazakhstan (4)
6. South Korea (3)
7. Macau (1)
8. Thailand (7)
9. Uzbekistan (6)

== Entries ==
Events	KL1	KL2	KL3	VL2	VL3
Men's	6	7	9	5	8
Women's	4	6	7	4	8

== Athletes ==
Source:

== Medal table ==
* Host nation (China)

Rank	NPC	Gold	Silver	Bronze	Total
1	Uzbekistan (UZB)	6	0	0	6
2	Iran (IRI)	2	1	2	5
3	China (CHN)*	1	3	2	6
4	India (IND)	1	1	2	4
5	Kazakhstan (KAZ)	0	3	2	5
6	Japan (JPN)	0	1	2	3
7	Thailand (THA)	0	1	0	1
Totals (7 entries)		10	10	10	30

== Medalists ==
Event	Class	Gold	Silver	Bronze
Men's kayak	KL1	Saeid Hosseinpour; Iran	Yu Xiaowei; China	Maxim Bogatyrev; Kazakhstan
Men's kayak	KL2	Azizbek Abdulkhabibov; Uzbekistan	Bibarys Spatay; Kazakhstan	Hiromi Tatsumi; Japan
Men's kayak	KL3	Khasan Kuldashev; Uzbekistan	Zhalgas Taikenov; Kazakhstan	Manish Kaurav; India
Men's va'a	VL2	Eslam Jahedi; Iran	Santi Wantawee; Thailand	Gajendra Singh; India
Men's va'a	VL3	Khaytmurot Sherkuziev; Uzbekistan	Bibarys Spatay; Kazakhstan	Pu Yi; China
Women's kayak	KL1	Xie Maosan; China	Monika Seryu; Japan	Sara Abdolmaleki; Iran
Women's kayak	KL2	Prachi Yadav; India	Wang Shanshan; China	Roya Soltani; Iran
Women's kayak	KL3	Shakhnoza Mirzaeva; Uzbekistan	Shahla Behrouzirad; Iran	Cai Yuqingyan; China
Women's va'a	VL2	Irodakhon Rustamova; Uzbekistan	Prachi Yadav; India	Saki Komatsu; Japan
Women's va'a	VL3	Shakhzoda Mamadalieva; Uzbekistan	Zhong Yongyuan; China	Zhanyl Baltabayeva; Kazakhstan
