= Goalball at the 2022 Asian Para Games =

- Venue: Zhejiang Tangxi Goalball Base
- Location: Hangzhou, Zhejiang, China
- Dates: 23–28 October 2023

Goalball was one of the events featured at the 2022 Asian Para Games, which took place at the Zhejiang Tangxi Goalball Base in Hangzhou, Zhejiang, China, from 23 to 27 October 2023.

== Draw ==
The men's teams were drawn into two groups of four while all the women's event is schedules to be held in a round robin event.

=== Men ===
Group A

- China
- Jordan
- Saudi Arabia
- South Korea

Group B

- Iran
- Iraq
- Japan
- Qatar

=== Women ===
Round Robin

- China
- Iran
- Japan
- South Korea
- Thailand

== Results ==
=== Men's tournament ===
==== Preliminary round ====
===== Group A =====
Pos	Team	Pld	W	D	L	GF	GA	GD	Pts	Qualification
1	China (H)	3	3	0	0	37	15	+22	9	Semi-finals
2	South Korea	3	2	0	1	31	19	+12	6	Semi-finals
3	Jordan	3	1	0	2	18	31	−13	3	5th place match
4	Saudi Arabia	3	0	0	3	19	40	−21	0	7th place match

Source: HAPGOC
(H) Hosts

23 October 2023; 10:00 UTC+8	China	10–6	South Korea	Zhejiang Tangxi Goalball Base
23 October 2023; 10:00 UTC+8		Report		Zhejiang Tangxi Goalball Base

23 October 2023; 14:45 UTC+8	Jordan	13–6	Saudi Arabia	Zhejiang Tangxi Goalball Base
23 October 2023; 14:45 UTC+8		Report		Zhejiang Tangxi Goalball Base

24 October 2023; 10:00 UTC+8	China	14–6	Saudi Arabia	Zhejiang Tangxi Goalball Base
24 October 2023; 10:00 UTC+8		Report		Zhejiang Tangxi Goalball Base

24 October 2023; 14:45 UTC+8	South Korea	12–2	Jordan	Zhejiang Tangxi Goalball Base
24 October 2023; 14:45 UTC+8		Report		Zhejiang Tangxi Goalball Base

25 October 2023; 10:00 UTC+8	China	13–3	Jordan	Zhejiang Tangxi Goalball Base
25 October 2023; 10:00 UTC+8		Report		Zhejiang Tangxi Goalball Base

25 October 2023; 14:45 UTC+8	South Korea	13–7	Saudi Arabia	Zhejiang Tangxi Goalball Base
25 October 2023; 14:45 UTC+8		Report		Zhejiang Tangxi Goalball Base

===== Group B =====
Pos	Team	Pld	W	D	L	GF	GA	GD	Pts	Qualification
1	Japan	3	3	0	0	35	12	+23	9	Semi-finals
2	Iran	3	2	0	1	29	15	+14	6	Semi-finals
3	Qatar	3	1	0	2	8	25	−17	3	5th place match
4	Iraq	3	0	0	3	9	29	−20	0	7th place match

Source: HAPGOC

23 October 2023; 11:15 UTC+8	Japan	13–8	Iran	Zhejiang Tangxi Goalball Base
23 October 2023; 11:15 UTC+8		Report		Zhejiang Tangxi Goalball Base

23 October 2023; 16:00 UTC+8	Iraq	4–7	Qatar	Zhejiang Tangxi Goalball Base
23 October 2023; 16:00 UTC+8		Report		Zhejiang Tangxi Goalball Base

24 October 2023; 11:15 UTC+8	Japan	10–0	Qatar	Zhejiang Tangxi Goalball Base
24 October 2023; 11:15 UTC+8		Report		Zhejiang Tangxi Goalball Base

24 October 2023; 16:00 UTC+8	Iran	10–1	Iraq	Zhejiang Tangxi Goalball Base
24 October 2023; 16:00 UTC+8		Report		Zhejiang Tangxi Goalball Base

25 October 2023; 11:15 UTC+8	Japan	12–4	Iraq	Zhejiang Tangxi Goalball Base
25 October 2023; 11:15 UTC+8		Report		Zhejiang Tangxi Goalball Base

25 October 2023; 14:45 UTC+8	Iran	11–1	Qatar	Zhejiang Tangxi Goalball Base
25 October 2023; 14:45 UTC+8		Report		Zhejiang Tangxi Goalball Base

==== Final round ====
Semi-finals
26 October – 14:00
China	11
Iran	7
26 October – 14:00
Japan	10
South Korea	5

Gold medal game
27 October – 15:15
China	9
Japan	3
Bronze medal game
27 October – 11:15
Iran	7
South Korea	3

5th place match
26 October – 11:15
Jordan	10
Qatar	4
7th place match
26 October – 11:15
Saudi Arabia	5
Iraq	6

Source: HAPGOC

===== 7th place match =====
26 October 2023; 11:15 UTC+8	Saudi Arabia	5–6	Iraq	Zhejiang Tangxi Goalball Base
26 October 2023; 11:15 UTC+8		Report		Zhejiang Tangxi Goalball Base

===== 5th place match =====
26 October 2023; 11:15 UTC+8	Jordan	10–4	Qatar	Zhejiang Tangxi Goalball Base
26 October 2023; 11:15 UTC+8		Report		Zhejiang Tangxi Goalball Base

===== Semi-finals =====
27 October 2023; 14:00 UTC+8	China	11–7	Iran	Zhejiang Tangxi Goalball Base
27 October 2023; 14:00 UTC+8		Report		Zhejiang Tangxi Goalball Base

27 October 2023; 14:00 UTC+8	Japan	10–5	South Korea	Zhejiang Tangxi Goalball Base
27 October 2023; 14:00 UTC+8		Report		Zhejiang Tangxi Goalball Base

===== Bronze medal game =====
27 October 2023; 11:15 UTC+8	Iran	7–3	South Korea	Zhejiang Tangxi Goalball Base
27 October 2023; 11:15 UTC+8		Report		Zhejiang Tangxi Goalball Base

===== Gold medal game =====
27 October 2023; 15:15 UTC+8	China	9–3	Japan	Zhejiang Tangxi Goalball Base
27 October 2023; 15:15 UTC+8		Report		Zhejiang Tangxi Goalball Base

=== Women's tournament ===
==== Preliminary round ====
Pos	Team	Pld	W	D	L	GF	GA	GD	Pts	Qualification
1	China (H)	4	4	0	0	41	14	+27	12	Semi-finals
2	Japan	4	2	1	1	21	6	+15	7	Semi-finals
3	South Korea	4	2	1	1	20	15	+5	7	Semi-finals
4	Thailand	4	1	0	3	13	34	−21	3	Semi-finals
5	Iran	4	0	0	4	7	33	−26	0	

Source: HAPGOC
(H) Hosts

23 October 2023; 10:00 UTC+8	Japan	4–5	China	Zhejiang Tangxi Goalball Base
23 October 2023; 10:00 UTC+8		Report		Zhejiang Tangxi Goalball Base

23 October 2023; 11:15 UTC+8	South Korea	11–2	Iran	Zhejiang Tangxi Goalball Base
23 October 2023; 11:15 UTC+8		Report		Zhejiang Tangxi Goalball Base

23 October 2023; 16:00 UTC+8	China	15–6	Thailand	Zhejiang Tangxi Goalball Base
23 October 2023; 16:00 UTC+8		Report		Zhejiang Tangxi Goalball Base

24 October 2023; 10:00 UTC+8	Japan	10–0	Thailand	Zhejiang Tangxi Goalball Base
24 October 2023; 10:00 UTC+8		Report		Zhejiang Tangxi Goalball Base

24 October 2023; 11:15 UTC+8	China	10–0	Iran	Zhejiang Tangxi Goalball Base
24 October 2023; 11:15 UTC+8		Report		Zhejiang Tangxi Goalball Base

24 October 2023; 16:00 UTC+8	Japan	1–1	South Korea	Zhejiang Tangxi Goalball Base
24 October 2023; 16:00 UTC+8		Report		Zhejiang Tangxi Goalball Base

25 October 2023; 10:00 UTC+8	China	11–1	South Korea	Zhejiang Tangxi Goalball Base
25 October 2023; 10:00 UTC+8		Report		Zhejiang Tangxi Goalball Base

25 October 2023; 11:15 UTC+8	Iran	2–6	Thailand	Zhejiang Tangxi Goalball Base
25 October 2023; 11:15 UTC+8		Report		Zhejiang Tangxi Goalball Base

26 October 2023; 10:00 UTC+8	South Korea	7–1	Thailand	Zhejiang Tangxi Goalball Base
26 October 2023; 10:00 UTC+8		Report		Zhejiang Tangxi Goalball Base

26 October 2023; 10:00 UTC+8	Japan	6–0	Iran	Zhejiang Tangxi Goalball Base
26 October 2023; 10:00 UTC+8		Report		Zhejiang Tangxi Goalball Base

==== Final round ====
Semi-finals
26 October – 15:15
China	11
Thailand	1
26 October – 16:30
Japan	3
South Korea	0

Gold medal game
27 October – 14:00
China	5
Japan	0
Bronze medal game
27 October – 10:00
Thailand	2
South Korea	7

Source: HAPGOC

===== Semi-finals =====
27 October 2023; 15:15 UTC+8	China	11–1	Thailand	Zhejiang Tangxi Goalball Base
27 October 2023; 15:15 UTC+8		Report		Zhejiang Tangxi Goalball Base

27 October 2023; 16:30 UTC+8	Japan	3–0	South Korea	Zhejiang Tangxi Goalball Base
27 October 2023; 16:30 UTC+8		Report		Zhejiang Tangxi Goalball Base

===== Bronze medal game =====
27 October 2023; 10:00 UTC+8	Thailand	2–7	South Korea	Zhejiang Tangxi Goalball Base
27 October 2023; 10:00 UTC+8		Report		Zhejiang Tangxi Goalball Base

===== Gold medal game =====
27 October 2023; 14:00 UTC+8	China	5–0	Japan	Zhejiang Tangxi Goalball Base
27 October 2023; 14:00 UTC+8		Report		Zhejiang Tangxi Goalball Base

== Medalists ==
Event	Gold	Silver	Bronze
Men	China (CHN): Yang Mingyuan; Chen Liangliang; Hu Mingyao; Yu Qinquan; Yu Deyi; Lai Liangyu	Japan (JPN): Yuto Sano; Haruki Torii; Yuji Taguchi; Kazuya Kaneko; Koji Miyajiki; Yuta Kawashima	Iran (IRI): Khalil Shahriarnasab; Milad Souri; Mahdi Abbasi; Yajlou Mostafa Shahbazi; Nematolah Sarafraz; Hasan Jafari
Women	China (CHN): Zhang Xiling; Cao Zhenhua; Wang Lizhen; Xu Miao; Wang Chunyan; Ke Peiying	Japan (JPN): Yuki Temma; Minami Arai; Eiko Kakehat; Norika Hagiwara; Rieko Takahashi; Masae Komiya	South Korea (KOR): Kim Heejin; Park Minkyoung; Kim Eunji; Sim Seonhwa; Seo Minji; Choi Eumjee

Source: HAPGOC (Men's and Women's)

== Athletes ==
Source:
