= Rowing at the 2022 Asian Para Games =

- Location: Hangzhou, China
- Dates: 26–28 October

Rowing at the 2022 Asian Para Games in China was held on 26 and 28 October 2023.

== Nations ==
1. China (10)
2. Hong Kong (2)
3. India (2)
4. Japan (7)
5. Kazakhstan (1)
6. South Korea (7)
7. Sri Lanka (2)
8. Thailand (10)
9. Uzbekistan (9)

== Events ==
1. PR1 Men's Single Sculls (6)
2. PR1 Women's Single Sculls (6)
3. PR2 Mixed Double Sculls (4)
4. PR3 Mixed Double Sculls (3)
5. PR3 Mixed Coxed Four (6)

== Medal table ==
Rank	NPC	Gold	Silver	Bronze	Total
1	China	4	1	0	5
2	Uzbekistan	1	1	2	4
3	South Korea	0	2	0	2
4	India	0	1	0	1
5	Thailand	0	0	2	2
6	Japan	0	0	1	1
Totals (6 entries)		5	5	5	15

== Medalists ==
Event	Class	Gold	Silver	Bronze
Men's single sculls	PR1	Kholmurod Egamberdiev; Uzbekistan	Yang Jie; China	Takuya Mori; Japan
Women's single sculls	PR1	Wang Lili; China	Kim Se-jeong; South Korea	Mukhayyo Abdusattorova; Uzbekistan
Mixed double sculls	PR2	China; Liu Shuang; Jiang Jijian	Uzbekistan; Gulchiroy Esanboeva; Otabek Kuchkorov	Thailand; Numtip Sinchai; Phongsakon Chumchai
Mixed double sculls	PR3	China; Wang Xixi; Chen Xinxin	India; Anita; Narayana Konganapalle	Thailand; Chintana Chueasaart; Poramin Phongamthippayakul
Mixed coxed four	PR3	China; Wang Xixi; Zeng Wanbin; Wu Yunlong; Jiang Lingtao; Yu Li	South Korea; Bae Ji-in; Kang Hyoun-joo; Kang I-seong; Lee Seung-hoo; Kim Su-hyun	Uzbekistan; Diyora Dodoeva; Gulzoda Shotanova; Kudratulla Khabibullaev; Abdumutal Abdurakhmonov; Amalbek Mustafakulov
