= Taekwondo at the 2022 Asian Para Games =

- Location: Hangzhou, China
- Dates: 24–26 October

Taekwondo made its debut as an Asian Para Games sport during the 2022 competition, held in Hangzhou, China. 77 fighters from 17 nations took part in the competition, fighting in ten weight categories. Competitors qualified under the K44 designation, which includes athletes with unilateral arm amputation or similar impairment, or loss of toes affecting the ability to lift the heel.

Before the tournament, Uzbekistan, Iran and Mongolia were favourites to win medals. By the end of the tournament, Iran had won the most medals, followed by China and Uzbekistan, with Mongolia coming fourth. Nepal’s Palesha Goverdhan claimed her country’s first ever international medal in Taekwondo, winning a bronze medal in the women’s 57kg class.

== Gold medal matches ==
In the men’s K44 58kg final, Taiwan’s Xiao Xiang-wen defeated Japan’s Mitsuya Tanaka by 27-11.

In the men’s K44 63kg final Mongolia’s Ganbat Bolor-Erdene defeated Iran’s Saeid Sadeghianpour by 6-2.

In the men’s K44 70kg final, Iran’s Mehdi Pourrahnama defeated China’s Shihe Chen by 16-3.

In the men’s K44 80kg final, Korea’s Joo Jeong-hun defeated Iran’s Alireza Bakht.

In the men’s K44 +80kg final, Iran’s Hamed Haghshenas defeated Kazakhstan’s Nyshan Omirali.

In the women’s 47kg final, Thailand’s Khwansuda Phuangkitcha defeated Uzbekistan’s Ziyodakhon Isakova by 7-4.

In the women’s 52kg final, China’s Shao Qian defeated Mongolia’s Surenjav Ulambayar.

In the women’s 57kg final, Roza Ebrahimi defeated Kazakhstan’s Kamilya Dosmalova by 34-15.

In the women’s 65kg final, China’s Yao Yinan defeated Iran’s Romina Chamsouraki.

In the women’s +65kg final, Uzbekistan’s Guljonoy Naimova defeated Iran’s Leila Mirzaei.

== Nations ==
1. Afghanistan (3)
2. Bahrain (1)
3. China (11)
4. India (4)
5. Iran (10)
6. Iraq (2)
7. Japan (4)
8. Kazakhstan (9)
9. South Korea (5)
10. Saudi Arabia (2)
11. Nepal (1)
12. Mongolia (4)
13. Philippines (1)
14. Chinese Taipei (2)
15. Thailand (4)
16. Uzbekistan (9)
17. Vietnam (1)

== Entries ==
Events	M/W 1	M/W 2	M/W 3	M/W 4	M/W 5
Men's	9	12	8	8	9
Women's	6	6	5	5	5

== Athletes ==
Source:

== Medal table ==
Rank	NPC	Gold	Silver	Bronze	Total
1	Iran (IRI)	3	4	3	10
2	China (CHN)	2	1	3	6
3	Uzbekistan (UZB)	1	1	5	7
4	Mongolia (MGL)	1	1	0	2
5	Thailand (THA)	1	0	2	3
6	South Korea (KOR)	1	0	1	2
7	Chinese Taipei (TPE)	1	0	0	1
8	Kazakhstan (KAZ)	0	2	3	5
9	Japan (JPN)	0	1	1	2
10	India (IND)	0	0	1	1
10	Nepal (NEP)	0	0	1	1
Totals (11 entries)		10	10	20	40

== Medalists ==
=== Men ===
Event	Gold	Silver	Bronze
58 kg	Xiao Xiang-wen; Chinese Taipei	Mitsuya Tanaka; Japan	Thanwa Kaenkham; Thailand
58 kg	Xiao Xiang-wen; Chinese Taipei	Mitsuya Tanaka; Japan	Sanjarbek Mukhtorov; Uzbekistan
63 kg	Ganbatyn Bolor-Erdene; Mongolia	Saeid Sadeghianpour; Iran	Tanapan Sotthiset; Thailand
63 kg	Ganbatyn Bolor-Erdene; Mongolia	Saeid Sadeghianpour; Iran	Kudratjon Haydarov; Uzbekistan
70 kg	Mahdi Pourrahnama; Iran	Chen Shihe; China	Shunsuke Kudo; Japan
70 kg	Mahdi Pourrahnama; Iran	Chen Shihe; China	Javokhir Alikulov; Uzbekistan
80 kg	Joo Jeong-hun; South Korea	Alireza Bakht; Iran	Nurlan Dombayev; Kazakhstan
80 kg	Joo Jeong-hun; South Korea	Alireza Bakht; Iran	Asadbek Toshtemirov; Uzbekistan
+80 kg	Hamed Haghshenas; Iran	Nyshan Omirali; Kazakhstan	Alisher Garipollayev; Kazakhstan
+80 kg	Hamed Haghshenas; Iran	Nyshan Omirali; Kazakhstan	Asadbek Anvarov; Uzbekistan

=== Women ===
Event	Gold	Silver	Bronze
47 kg	Khwansuda Phuangkitcha; Thailand	Ziyodakhon Isakova; Uzbekistan	Aruna Tanwar; India
47 kg	Khwansuda Phuangkitcha; Thailand	Ziyodakhon Isakova; Uzbekistan	Maryam Abdollahpour; Iran
52 kg	Shao Qian; China	Surenjav Ulambayar; Mongolia	Narges Javadi; Iran
52 kg	Shao Qian; China	Surenjav Ulambayar; Mongolia	Mahdiyeh Sadat Hosseini; Iran
57 kg	Roza Ebrahimi; Iran	Kamilya Dosmalova; Kazakhstan	Li Yujie; China
57 kg	Roza Ebrahimi; Iran	Kamilya Dosmalova; Kazakhstan	Palesha Goverdhan; Nepal
65 kg	Yao Yinan; China	Romina Chamsouraki; Iran	Mariam Salimgereeva; Kazakhstan
65 kg	Yao Yinan; China	Romina Chamsouraki; Iran	Kim Won-seon; South Korea
+65 kg	Guljonoy Naimova; Uzbekistan	Leila Mirzaei; Iran	Tang Qi; China
+65 kg	Guljonoy Naimova; Uzbekistan	Leila Mirzaei; Iran	Pan Lianhua; China

== Ranking ==
Source:
