= Zhang Xufei =

Chinese sitting volleyball player (born 1984)

Zhang Xufei (born 28 August 1984 in Shanghai) is a Chinese sitting volleyball player.

She was in China's women's sitting volleyball team at the Summer Paralympics in 2004, 2008, 2012, 2016, 2020 and 2024, winning gold medals in 2004, 2008, and 2012, and silver in 2016, 2020 and 2024.

She was also in the gold-medal-winning team at the 2022 Asian Para Games.
