= Asila Mirzayorova =

Uzbekistani Paralympic athlete

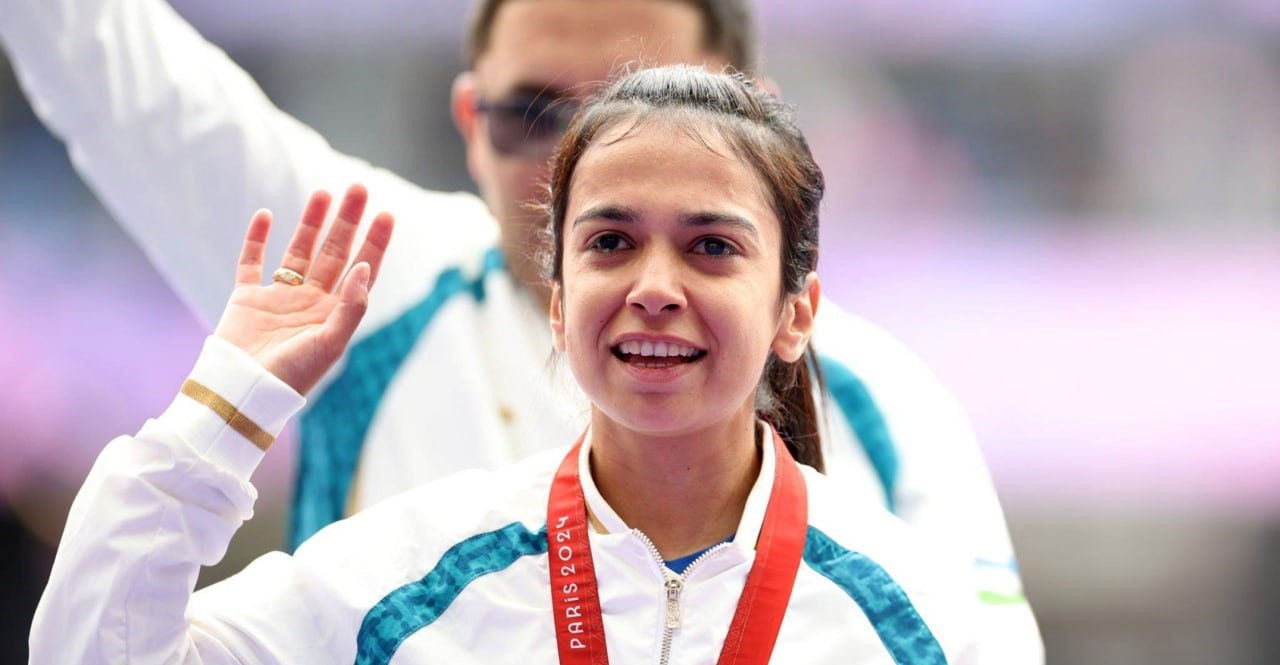
- Asila Mirzayorova at the 2024 Summer Paralympics

Personal information
- Native name: Asila Mirzayorova
- Citizenship: Uzbek
- Born: 3 July 1999 (age 27)

Sport
- Country: Uzbekistan
- Sport: Para-athletics
- Disability: Vision impairment
- Disability class: T11
- Event: Long jump
Medal record
Women's para-athletics
Representing Uzbekistan
Paralympic Games
Gold medal – first place	2024 Paris	Long jump T11
Silver medal – second place	2020 Tokyo	Long jump T11
World Championships
Gold medal – first place	2023 Paris	Long jump T11
Gold medal – first place	2024 Kobe	Long jump T11
Asian Para Games
Gold medal – first place	2022 Hangzhou	Long jump T11/12
Bronze medal – third place	2018 Jakarta	Long jump T11/12

Asila Mirzayorova (born 3 July 1999) is a visually impaired Uzbekistani Paralympic athlete. She won the silver medal in the women's long jump T11 event at the 2020 Summer Paralympics held in Tokyo, Japan. At the 2024 Summer Paralympics, she won gold in the women's long jump T11 while breaking the Paralympic record twice. Her best 2024 Paralympics jump was 5.24 meters.

== Biography ==
Asila was born in 1999 in the city of Karshi, Kashkadarya Region, Uzbekistan. She had perfect vision until the age of 15 and was studying piano at a music school. After a head injury, she lost her sight and later began participating in sports. In 2021, by the decree of the President of Uzbekistan, Shavkat Mirziyoyev, she was awarded the title of "Oʻzbekiston Respublikasida xizmat koʻrsatgan sportchi".

== Career ==
In 2016, she began participating in Paralympic athletics under the guidance of coach Sardor Abduhalikov. Starting from 2017, she took part in international competitions. In the same year, she won the Uzbekistan Para-Athletics Championship. In that year, she also secured a gold medal in long jump at the Para Asian Junior Games. In 2018, at the Summer Para Asian Games in Jakarta, Indonesia, she won a bronze medal in the long jump with a result of 4.47 meters. In 2019, at the World Para Athletics Championships in Dubai, UAE, she finished in seventh place with a result of 4.44 meters.

She won the silver medal in the women's long jump T11 event at the 2020 Summer Paralympics held in Tokyo, Japan. In 2021, she was awarded the "O‘zbekiston belgisi" medal. In the same year, she won a gold medal in long jump at the Grand Prix stage of Paralympic athletics in Dubai, UAE. At the Summer Paralympic Games in Tokyo, Japan, in the long jump competition in the T11 category, she achieved a jump of 4.91 meters, earning her a silver medal in the games.

She won the gold medal in the women's long jump T11 event at the 2023 World Para Athletics Championships held in Paris, France with a leap of 5.13 meters. With that result, Asila Mirzayorova won a berth at the 2024 Summer Paralympics Games, where she set a new Paralympic record of 5.24 meters while winning the gold medal.
