= Natsuki Wada =

Japanese table tennis player (born 2003)

Personal information
- Native name: 和田なつき
- Nationality: Japanese
- Born: 29 August 2003 (age 23) Matsubara, Osaka, Japan
- Website: https://wadanatsuki.com/

Sport
- Sport: Para table tennis
- Disability class: C11
Medal record
Women's para table tennis
Representing Japan
Paralympic Games
| Gold medal – first place | 2024 Paris | Singles C11 |
Asian Para Games
| Gold medal – first place | 2022 Hangzhou | Singles C11 |

Natsuki Wada (和田 なつき, Wada Natsuki; born 29 August 2003) is a Japanese para table tennis player. She represented Japan at the 2024 Summer Paralympics.

== Career ==
Wada represented Japan at the 2024 Summer Paralympics and won a gold medal in the singles C11 event.
