= Linping Sports Centre Gymnasium =

Sports venue in Hangzhou, China

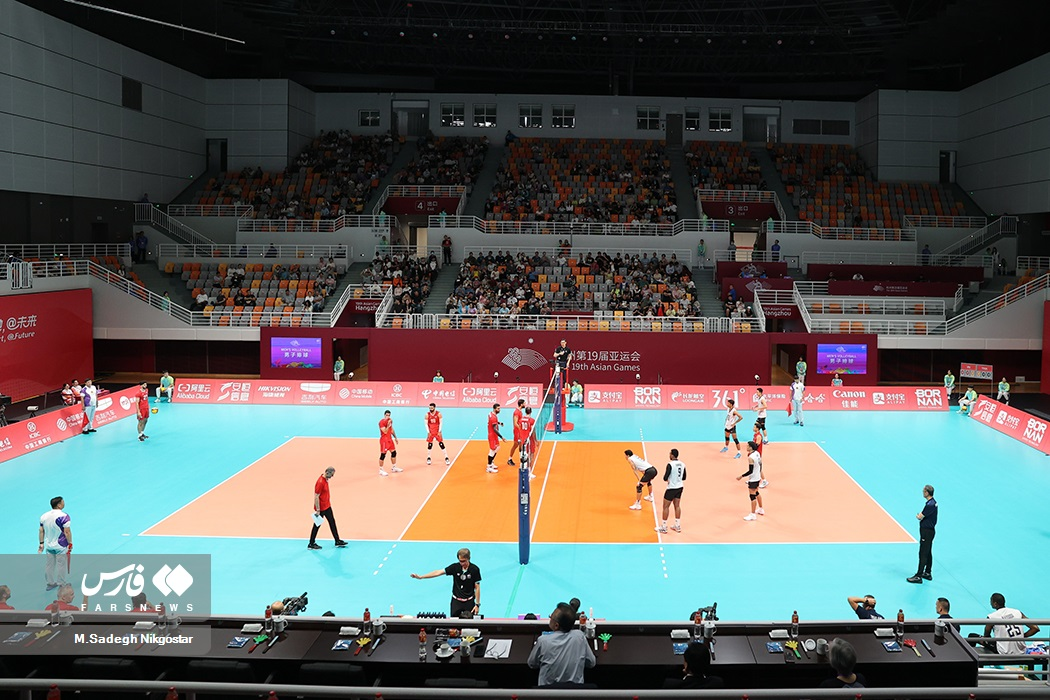
- Interactive map of Linping Sports Centre Gymnasium
- Full name: Linping Sports Centre Gymnasium
- Location: Hangzhou, China
- Coordinates: 30°24′57″N 120°18′23″E
- Capacity: 4,200
- Field size: 46 m × 28.5 m (151 ft × 94 ft)

Linping Sports Centre Gymnasium (Chinese: 临平体育中心体育馆, romanized: Línpíng tǐyù zhōngxīn tǐyùguǎn) is an indoor sporting arena located in Hangzhou, China. The stadium has a capacity of 4,200 and covers an area of 16,885 square meters (181,750 sq ft). The Linping Sports Center was the main volleyball and futsal venue, hosting the preliminary and final matches and the karate during the 2022 Asian Games.
