= Gulnaz Zhuzbaeva =

Human rights activist from Kyrgyzstan

- Гүлназ Жүзбаева
- Education: Louisiana Center for the Blind
- Occupation: Disability rights activist
- Organization(s): Kyrgyz Federation of the Blind; Empower Blind People
- Awards: BBC 100 Women (2020)

Gulnaz Zhuzbaeva (in Kyrgyz: Гүлназ Жүзбаева) is a disability rights activist from Kyrgyzstan. She was presented with one the BBC's 100 Women awards in 2020. Formerly head of the Kyrgyz Federation of the Blind, Zhuzbaeva worked as a Braille translator in 2021. She also provides training for people who are visually impaired, as well as their employers. She is also a co-director of the non-governmental organisation Empower Blind People. She has previously studied at the Louisiana Center for the Blind. Public speaking engagements have included: a TEDx talk in Bishkek in 2021; for the United Nations on International Women's Day in 2019, amongst others.
