= 2022 Asian Para Games =

Multi-sport event in Hangzhou, China

4th Asian Para Games
- Host city: Hangzhou, Zhejiang, China
- Motto: Hearts Meet, Dreams Shine (Chinese: 心相约，梦闪耀; pinyin: Xīn xiāngyuē, mèng shǎnyào)
- Nations: 43
- Athletes: 3,100
- Events: 501 in 22 sports (in 23 disciplines)
- Opening: 22 October 2023
- Closing: 28 October 2023
- Opened by: Ding Xuexiang; Vice Premier of the People's Republic of China
- Closed by: Majid Rashed; President of the Asian Paralympic Committee
- Athlete's Oath: Yu Qinquan; Jiang Yuyuan
- Judge's Oath: Chen Ran; Xia Xin
- Torch lighter: Xu Jialing
- Main venue: Hangzhou Sports Park Stadium
- Website: www.hangzhou2022.cn/paragames/En/

The 2022 Asian Para Games (Chinese: 2022年亚洲残疾人运动会; pinyin: 2022nían yàzhōu cánjírén yùndònghuì), also known as the 4th Asian Para Games and commonly known as the Hangzhou 2022 Asian Para Games, were a multi-sport event that paralleled the 2022 Asian Games which was held for Asian athletes with disabilities in Hangzhou, Zhejiang, China from 22 to 28 October 2023. Hangzhou was the second Chinese city to host the Asian Para Games, after Guangzhou in 2010.

Originally scheduled to take place from 9 to 15 October 2022, the event was postponed to 2023 on 17 May 2022 due to the COVID-19 pandemic as a result of the 2020 Summer Olympics in Tokyo postponement to 2021. XXIV Winter Olympic Games (in Chinese 第二十四屆冬季奧林匹克運動會, ��二十四届冬季��林匹克运动会, Di èrshísì jiè dōngjì àolínpǐkè yùndònghuì), also known as Beijing 2022, took place in Beijing, capital of China, from February 4 to 20, 2022. The XIII Paralympic Winter Games were held in the same location in March.

== Host city ==
As is the tradition of the event, since 2010, the Asian Para Games are usually held after every Asian Games in the same host country. On 16 September 2018, the Asian Paralympic Committee announced that Hangzhou in Zhejiang Province, China hosted the fourth edition of the Asian Para Games after making a visit there in July. The city was previously awarded the 2022 Asian Games on 16 September 2015 by the Olympic Council of Asia.

== Development and preparation ==
=== Marketing ===
==== Emblem ====
The official emblem of the 2022 Asian Para Games, "Ever Forward", was unveiled on 2 March 2020. It features a wheelchair athlete striving forward on a running track with 10 semi-arc lines and resembling surging Qiantang River tides. The organising committee stated that the emblem was meant to reflect "the sublime heroism of the para-athletes in persevering and challenging themselves".

==== Mascot ====
Fei Fei (飞飞), a character inspired by the motive of the divine bird in the Liangzhu culture and which is a symbol of bliss in local legend, was unveiled online on 16 April 2020 as the official mascot of the Games. The first "fly" is the flight of a bird. The high sky allows birds to fly, which means a good atmosphere of tolerance, respect and friendship in human society. The second "fly" is the mental state of disabled athletes who chase their dreams and leap ahead of themselves. She displays a pattern of the Liangzhu Culture around her body from wings to cheeks and the letter "i" on her crown representing intelligence and Hangzhou as the City of Internet, which blinks when she is happy or playing sports. Her chest features a ring of 45 dots which represents the Asian Paralympic Committee's (APC) members, with the Games logo in the centre. She is described as the fusion of Hangzhou's heritage and drive for technological innovation and a messenger of joy and cultural distinction.

==== Motto ====
The official motto of the 2022 Asian Para Games, "Hearts meet, Dreams shine" was unveiled on the same day as the emblem. Similar to the motto of the Asian Games, it symbolises connectivity between the countries of Asia.

==== Medals ====
On 14 July 2023, the 100-day countdown to the 4th Asian Para Games, the medal design named "Osmanthus Grace" (Chinese: 桂子; pinyin: Guìzǐ) was released. Its name was derived from a Tang lyric poem composed by the poet-governor of Hangzhou a thousand years ago, one line of which goes, "Around mountain temples, I search for osmanthus blooms falling from the moon" (Chinese: 山寺月中寻桂子; pinyin: Shānsì yuè zhōng xún guìzǐ). The medal design was a combination of two different Jades: round green Bi and yellow square Cong in the Liangzhu culture, respectively associated with heaven and earth. The obverse featured the Games edition logo encircled by Sweet Osmanthus flowers – city flower of Hangzhou, while the reverse featured the Asian Paralympic Council Emblem surrounded by braille letters and the name of the event in Chinese and English.

=== Torch ===
"Laurel Wreath" design thought, from the demonstration of five thousand years of Chinese civilization history Liangzhu Yu Cong and Hangzhou flower - osmanthus flower, respect Liangzhu Yu Cong as the source of culture, the gift of heaven and earth, the road through the ancient and modern; The fragrance of Hangzhou osmanthus flowers is overflowing, implying the idea of sunshine, harmony, self-improvement and sharing.

=== Torch relay ===
The flame of Asian Para Games 2022 was lit in Guangzhou Sports Culture Museum, Guangzhou on 12 October. The flame arrived in Zhejiang province after one week later after a train trip and the relay had three days duration and was used to light the cauldron at Hangzhou Sports Park Stadium on 22 October.

=== Venues ===
In December 2021, Asian Paralympic Committee declared 19 final venues ready for upcoming Asian Para Games.

== Ceremonies ==
=== Opening ceremony ===
The opening ceremony of the 2022 Asian Para Games was held on 22 October 2023, at the Hangzhou Sports Park Stadium in Hangzhou, China. The ceremony was directed by Sha Xiaolan, one of assistant directors of the opening and closing ceremonies of the 2022 Winter Olympics and 2022 Winter Paralympics held in Beijing. It was attended by Chinese Vice Premier Ding Xuexiang, some Asian foreign leaders and the President of the International Paralympic Committee, Andrew Parsons. The final torchbearer was a Chinese para-swimmer gold medalist Xu Jialing, who lighted the cauldron to started the Games.

=== Closing ceremony ===
The closing ceremony for the 2022 Asian Para Games was held on 28 October 2023. The ceremony closed after nine days of competition and 566 events at the Hangzhou Sports Park Stadium in Hangzhou, China.

== The Games ==
=== Sports ===
The Games featured 501 gold medal events in 22 sports (in 23 disciplines). including Para Taekwondo, Para Canoe and Go which were included for the first time in the games' programme. Absent from the previous edition, Blind Football and Rowing which were not featured at the 2018 edition returned. The organizing committee chose to drop the bowling events held at the 3 previous editions due a lack of possible venues and also motivated by the changes of 2022 Asian Games program.Also two non-Paralympic sports were at the program: lawn bowls and mind sports (chess and go). It is worth noting that 431 of the 501 events held were present in the 2020 Summer Paralympics program and will be in the 2024 Summer Paralympics.

Another change compared to 2018 was that the number of events decreased from 566 to 501.However, this was a consequence of the reduction in the number of finals, caused by cancellation due to lack of registered athletes or due to several functional reclassifications of athletes and the merger of classes. Thus, the organizers planned to compete in 566 finals.

=== Changes at the Sporting Program ===
- 1 Sport removed consist of 18 events: Bowling at the 2018 Asian Para Games (-18).
- 5 New Sports added 30 events: Para Taekwondo (+10), Para Canoeing (+10), Mind Sports (+4), Blind Football (1), Para Rowing (+5).
- 2 Sports reduced their events (-13): Para Athletics (-8), Para Table Tennis (-5).
- 7 Sports added 61 new events: Para Archery (+6), Para Badminton (+3), Boccia (with changes in competition format) (+4), Para Cycling (+3), Para Judo (with changes in classifications) (+1), Lawn Bowls (+9), Para Swimming (+35).

In swimming: 141 events were planned but for reclassifications and shortage competitors it was decreased to 97 events.

In athletics: 153 events were planned but for reclassifications and shortage competitors it was decreased to 141 events (some events were played but no medal was awarded).

In lawn bowls: 24 events were planned but for reclassifications and shortage competitors it was decreased to 18 events.

In table tennis: 37 events were planned but for classifications and shortage competitors it was decreased to 36 events.

In archery: 15 events were planned but for classifications and shortage competitors it was decreased to 14 events.

In mind sports: 4 events in Go were planned but for classifications and shortage competitors it was decreased to 3 events.

2022 Asian Para Games Sports Programme

- Archery (14)
- Athletics (141)
- Badminton (22)
- Board Games (27)
  - Chess (24)
  - Go (3)
- Boccia (11)
- Canoeing (10)
- Cycling (30)
  - Road (15)
  - Track (15)
- Football 5-a-side (1)
- Goalball (2)
- Judo (16)
- Lawn bowls (18)
- Powerlifting (20)
- Rowing (5)
- Sitting volleyball (2)
- Shooting (13)
- Swimming (97)
- Table tennis (36)
- Taekwondo (10)
- Wheelchair basketball (2)
- Wheelchair fencing (18)
- Wheelchair tennis (6)

=== Events ===
| # | Sports | Events | Gold | Silver | Bronze | Total | Entries | Medalists | Medal Tables |
|---|---|---|---|---|---|---|---|---|---|
| 1 | Archery | 14 | 14 | 13 | 12 | 39 | | | |
| 2 | Athletics | 141 | 141 | 142 | 132 | 415 | | | |
| 3 | Badminton | 22 | 22 | 22 | 42 | 86 | | | |
| 4 | Boccia | 11 | 11 | 11 | 11 | 33 | | | |
| 5 | Chess | 24 | 24 | 24 | 24 | 72 | | | |
| 6 | Canoe | 10 | 10 | 10 | 10 | 30 | | | |
| 7 | Cycling | 30 | 30 | 28 | 27 | 85 | | | |
| 8 | B Football | 1 | 1 | 1 | 1 | 3 | | | |
| 9 | Goalball | 2 | 2 | 2 | 2 | 6 | | | |
| 10 | Judo | 16 | 16 | 16 | 27 | 59 | | | |
| 11 | Bowls | 18 | 18 | 18 | 18 | 54 | | | |
| 12 | Go | 3 | 3 | 3 | 3 | 9 | | | |
| 13 | Powerlifting | 20 | 20 | 20 | 20 | 60 | | | |
| 14 | Rowing | 5 | 5 | 5 | 5 | 15 | | | |
| 15 | Shooting | 13 | 13 | 13 | 13 | 39 | | | |
| 16 | Swimming | 97 | 98 | 97 | 96 | 291 | | | |
| 17 | Taekwondo | 10 | 10 | 10 | 20 | 40 | | | |
| 18 | Table Tennis | 36 | 36 | 36 | 69 | 141 | | | |
| 19 | Volleyball | 2 | 2 | 2 | 2 | 6 | | | |
| 20 | Basketball | 2 | 2 | 2 | 2 | 6 | | | |
| 21 | Fencing | 18 | 18 | 18 | 30 | 66 | | | |
| 22 | Tennis | 6 | 6 | 6 | 6 | 18 | | | |
| Total | | 501 | 502 | 499 | 572 | 1573 | - | - | - |

== Calendar ==
| Event/Date→ | | October | | | | | | | | | | Events |
| Event/Date→ | | 19 Thu | 20 Fri | 21 Sat | 22 Sun | 23 Mon | 24 Tue | 25 Wed | 26 Thu | 27 Fri | 28 Sat | Events |
|---|---|---|---|---|---|---|---|---|---|---|---|---|
| Ceremonies | | | | | OC | | | | | | CC | |
| Archery | | | | | | ● | ● | 4 | 4 | 4 | 2 | 14+1 |
| Athletics | | | | | | 25 | 28 | 28 | 26 | 19 | 15 | 141+12 |
| Badminton | | | ● | ● | | ● | ● | ● | 11 | 11 | | 22 |
| Blind football | | | | | | ● | ● | ● | ● | ● | 1 | 1 |
| Board games | Chess | | | | | ● | ● | ● | 12 | ● | 12 | 24 |
| Board games | Go | | | | | ● | ● | 2 | 1 | | | 3+1 |
| Boccia | | | | ● | | ● | ● | 8 | ● | 3 | | 11 |
| Canoeing | | | | | | 5 | 5 | | | | | 10 |
| Cycling | Track | | | | | 5 | 6 | 4 | | | | 15 |
| Cycling | Road | | | | | | | | 8 | 7 | | 15 |
| Goalball | | | | | | ● | ● | ● | ● | 2 | | 2 |
| Judo | | | | | | 5 | 5 | 6 | | | | 16 |
| Lawn bowls | | | | ● | | ● | 2 | 10 | ● | 6 | | 18+6 |
| Powerlifting | | | | | | 3 | 4 | 4 | 4 | 3 | 2 | 20 |
| Rowing | | | | | | | | | ● | | 5 | 5 |
| Shooting | | | | | | 3 | 3 | 2 | 2 | 3 | | 13 |
| Sitting volleyball | | | | | | ● | ● | ● | ● | 2 | | 2 |
| Swimming | | | | | | 19 | 21 | 19 | 18 | 20 | | 97+44 |
| Table tennis | | | | | ● | ● | ● | 21 | ● | 8 | 7 | 36+1 |
| Taekwondo | | | | | | 3 | 4 | 3 | | | | 10 |
| Wheelchair basketball | | ● | ● | ● | | | ● | ● | ● | 2 | | 2 |
| Wheelchair fencing | | | | | | 4 | 2 | 4 | 2 | 4 | 2 | 18 |
| Wheelchair tennis | | | | | | ● | ● | 2 | 3 | 1 | | 6 |
| Daily medal events | | | | | | 72 | 80 | 117 | 91 | 95 | 46 | 501+65 |
| Cumulative total | | | | | | 72 | 152 | 269 | 360 | 455 | 501 | 501+65 |

== Medal table ==
The top ten ranked NPCs at these Games are listed below.

* Host nation (China)

2022 Asian Para Games medal table
| Rank | NPC | Gold | Silver | Bronze | Total |
|---|---|---|---|---|---|
| 1 | China* | 214 | 167 | 140 | 521 |
| 2 | Iran | 44 | 46 | 41 | 131 |
| 3 | Japan | 42 | 49 | 59 | 150 |
| 4 | South Korea | 30 | 33 | 40 | 103 |
| 5 | Indonesia | 29 | 30 | 37 | 96 |
| 6 | India | 27 | 32 | 49 | 108 |
| 7 | Thailand | 27 | 26 | 55 | 108 |
| 8 | Uzbekistan | 25 | 24 | 30 | 79 |
| 9 | Philippines | 10 | 4 | 5 | 19 |
| 10 | Hong Kong | 8 | 15 | 24 | 47 |
| 11–33 | Remaining NPCs | 44 | 74 | 91 | 209 |
| Totals (33 entries) | | 500 | 500 | 571 | 1,571 |

== Participation ==
43 National Paralympic Committees who are members of the Asian Paralympic Committee were expected to compete.

North Korea withdrew from the games after the Asian Paralympic Committee refused to allow it to use their national symbols in compliance with sanctions by the World Anti-Doping Agency (WADA). WADA imposed the sanction in October 2021 due to North Korea's non-compliance with doping regulations. This is in contrast with the 2022 Asian Games where North Korea was allowed to use its symbols by the Olympic Council of Asia in spite of the WADA sanctions.

Participating National Paralympic Committees
- Afghanistan (19)
- Bangladesh (12)
- Bahrain (7)
- Bhutan (4)
- Brunei (1)
- Cambodia (24)
- China (439) (host)
- Hong Kong (98)
- India (309)
- Indonesia (130)
- Iran (209)
- Iraq (55)
- Japan (259)
- Jordan (17)
- Kazakhstan (131)
- South Korea (213)
- Kuwait (25)
- Kyrgyzstan (28)
- Laos (16)
- Lebanon (4)
- Macau (18)
- Malaysia (98)
- Maldives (5)
- Mongolia (63)
- Myanmar (19)
- Nepal (17)
- Oman (7)
- Pakistan (11)
- Palestine (5)
- Philippines (72)
- Qatar (10)
- Saudi Arabia (26)
- Singapore (31)
- Sri Lanka (26)
- Syria (12)
- Chinese Taipei (93)
- Tajikistan (9)
- Thailand (314)
- Timor-Leste (10)
- Turkmenistan (11)
- United Arab Emirates (42)
- Uzbekistan (103)
- Vietnam (71)
- Yemen (4)

== Final Ranking ==
1. Archery
2. Athletics
3. Badminton
4. Boccia
5. Chess
6. Canoe
7. Cycling
8. B Football
9. Goalball
10. Judo
11. Bowls
12. Go
13. Powerlifting
14. Rowing
15. Shooting
16. Swimming
17. Taekwondo
18. Table Tennis
19. Volleyball
20. Basketball
21. Fencing
22. Tennis

== See also ==
- 2022 Asian Games
- 2022 Winter Paralympics
