= China at the Asian Para Games =

- IPC code: CHN
- NPC: National Paralympic Committee of China
- Medals Ranked 1st: Gold 952 Silver 585 Bronze 446 Total 1,983

Asian Para Games appearances (overview)
- 2010; 2014; 2018; 2022; 2026

The People's Republic of China first competed at the Asian Para Games in 2010. China has led the gold medal count in each Asian Games since 2010 Asian Games. At the Asian Para Games in 2010, Yuqing Cai won the first gold medal for China in Women's 400m freestyle -S9 final. Hangzhou in Zhejiang Province, China hosted the fourth edition of the Asian Para Games in October 2023.

China has been the only team to win more than 100 gold medals and 200 total medals at every Asian Para Games.

== Asian Games ==
*Red border color indicates tournament was held on home soil.

=== Medals by Games ===
Games	Rank	Gold	Silver	Bronze	Total
2010 Guangzhou	1	185	118	88	391
2014 Incheon	1	174	95	48	317
2018 Jakarta	1	172	88	59	319
2022 Hangzhou	1	214	167	140	521
2026 Aichi-Nagoya	1	207	117	111	435
Total	1	952	585	446	1983

[*]

== Medals by Sports ==
Para Dance ?

Medals per sport

Sport Gold Silver Bronze Total

Archery 9 6 5 20

Athletics 192 110 57 359

Badminton 11 8 8 27

Blind Football 1 0 1 2

Boccia 3 1 3 7

Cycling Road 24 14 12 50

Goalball 3 3 0 6

Judo 12 2 11 25

Para Football 7-a-side 0 1 0 1

Para Shooting 12 16 10 38

Powerlifting 28 5 2 35

Rowing 4 1 0 5

Sitting Volleyball 3 3 0 6

Swimming 135 90 47 272

Table Tennis 57 21 24 102

Wheelchair Basketball 2 2 0 4

Wheelchair Fencing 34 15 14 63

Wheelchair Tennis 1 3 1 5

Total 531 301 195 1027

Medals per year

Year Gold Silver Bronze Total

2018 172 88 59 319

2014 174 95 48 317

2010 185 118 88 391

Total 531 301 195 1027

== See also ==
- China at the Paralympics
- Sports in China
