= List of Asian Para Games medalists for Indonesia =

This is a list of Indonesian medalists at the Asian Para Games. For more information about Indonesian participation at the Asian Para Games, see Indonesia at the Asian Para Games.

== Medalists ==
=== Archery ===
Medal	Name	Event	Games
Bronze	Ken Swagumilang	Men's individual open compound	2022 Asian Para Games
Bronze	Wahyu Retno Wulandari; Mahda Aulia	Women's doubles open recurve	2022 Asian Para Games

=== Athletics ===
Medal	Name	Event	Games
Gold	Saptoyogo Purnomo	Men's 100 m T37	2018 Asian Para Games
Gold	Saptoyogo Purnomo	Men's 200 m T37	2018 Asian Para Games
Gold	Putri Aulia	Women's 100 m T13	2018 Asian Para Games
Gold	Karisma Evi Tiarani	Women's 100 m T42/63	2018 Asian Para Games
Gold	Rica Octavia	Women's long jump T20	2018 Asian Para Games
Gold	Suparni Yati	Women's shot put F20	2018 Asian Para Games
Gold	Saptoyogo Purnomo	Men's 100 m T37	2022 Asian Para Games
Gold	Partin	Men's 100 m T63	2022 Asian Para Games
Gold	Saptoyogo Purnomo	Men's 200 m T37	2022 Asian Para Games
Gold	Saptoyogo Purnomo	Men's 400 m T37	2022 Asian Para Games
Gold	Ni Made Arianti Putri	Women's 100 m T12	2022 Asian Para Games
Silver	Wagiyo	Men's 400 m T44	2014 Asian Para Games
Silver	Setyo Budi Hartanto; Martin Losu; Wagiyo; Rasyidi	Men's 4 × 100 m T42–47	2014 Asian Para Games
Silver	Abdul Halim Dalimunte	Men's 100 m T11	2018 Asian Para Games
Silver	Nur Ferry Pradana	Men's 100 m T45/46/47	2018 Asian Para Games
Silver	Eko Saputra	Men's 200 m T12	2018 Asian Para Games
Silver	Rizal Bagus Saktiyono	Men's 200 m T45/46/47	2018 Asian Para Games
Silver	Jaenal Aripin	Men's 200 m T54	2018 Asian Para Games
Silver	Felipus Kolymau	Men's 400 m T20	2018 Asian Para Games
Silver	Nur Ferry Pradana	Men's 400 m T45/46/47	2018 Asian Para Games
Silver	Setyo Budi Hartanto	Men's long jump T45/46/47	2018 Asian Para Games
Silver	Ni Made Arianti Putri	Women's 100 m T13	2018 Asian Para Games
Silver	Ni Made Arianti Putri	Women's 400 m T13	2018 Asian Para Games
Silver	Karisma Evi Tiarani	Women's long jump T42–44/61–64	2018 Asian Para Games
Silver	Famini	Women's discus throw F56/57	2018 Asian Para Games
Silver	Eko Saputra	Men's 100 m T12	2022 Asian Para Games
Silver	Alfin Nomleni	Men's 400 m T20	2022 Asian Para Games
Silver	Nur Ferry Pradana	Men's 400 m T47	2022 Asian Para Games
Silver	Partin	Men's long jump T63	2022 Asian Para Games
Silver	Karisma Evi Tiarani	Women's 100 m T63/64	2022 Asian Para Games
Silver	Suparni Yati	Women's shot put F20	2022 Asian Para Games
Silver	Ni Made Arianti Putri; Nanda Mei Sholihah; Saptoyogo Purnomo; Jaenal Aripin	Mixed 4 × 100 m universal relay	2022 Asian Para Games
Bronze	Suyono	Men's 200 m T38	2010 Asian Para Games
Bronze	Suyono	Men's 400 m T38	2010 Asian Para Games
Bronze	Setyo Budi Hartanto	Men's long jump F46	2010 Asian Para Games
Bronze	Abdul Halim Dalimunte	Men's 100 m T11	2014 Asian Para Games
Bronze	Rasyidi	Men's 100 m T44	2014 Asian Para Games
Bronze	Sunoto	Men's 200 m T11	2014 Asian Para Games
Bronze	Sunoto	Men's 400 m T11	2014 Asian Para Games
Bronze	Harjono Tarihoran; Sunoto; I Nyoman Oka; Abdul Halim Dalimunte	Men's 4 × 100 m relay T11–T13	2014 Asian Para Games
Bronze	Setyo Budi Hartanto	Men's long jump T47	2014 Asian Para Games
Bronze	Alan Sastra Ginting	Men's discus throw F57	2014 Asian Para Games
Bronze	Abdul Halim Dalimunte	Men's 200 m T11	2018 Asian Para Games
Bronze	Eko Saputra	Men's 400 m T12	2018 Asian Para Games
Bronze	Endi Nurdin Tine	Men's 400 m T20	2018 Asian Para Games
Bronze	Mulyono	Men's long jump T42/61/63	2018 Asian Para Games
Bronze	Rasyidi	Men's long jump T44/62/64	2018 Asian Para Games
Bronze	Alan Sastra Ginting	Men's discus throw F57	2018 Asian Para Games
Bronze	Endang Sari Sitorus	Women's 100 m T13	2018 Asian Para Games
Bronze	Elvin Elhudia Sesa	Women's 400 m T20	2018 Asian Para Games
Bronze	Tiwa	Women's shot put F20	2018 Asian Para Games
Bronze	Putri Aulia; Karisma Evi Tiarani; Saptoyogo Purnomo; Jaenal Aripin	Mixed 4 × 100 m universal relay	2018 Asian Para Games
Bronze	Nur Ferry Pradana	Men's 100 m T47	2022 Asian Para Games
Bronze	Jaenal Aripin	Men's 100 m T54	2022 Asian Para Games
Bronze	Fauzi Purwolaksono	Men's javelin throw F57	2022 Asian Para Games
Bronze	Rica Oktavia	Women's long jump T20	2022 Asian Para Games

=== Badminton ===
Medal	Name	Event	Games
Gold	Hary Susanto; Trihono	Men's doubles BMSTL 1–3	2010 Asian Para Games
Gold	Ukun Rukaendi	Men's singles SL3	2014 Asian Para Games
Gold	Fredy Setiawan	Men's singles SL4	2014 Asian Para Games
Gold	Hary Susanto; Ukun Rukaendi	Men's doubles SL3–SL4	2014 Asian Para Games
Gold	Fredy Setiawan; Leani Ratri Oktila	Mixed doubles SL3–SU5	2014 Asian Para Games
Gold	Dheva Anrimusthi	Men's singles SU5	2018 Asian Para Games
Gold	Dwiyoko; Fredy Setiawan	Men's doubles SL3–SL4	2018 Asian Para Games
Gold	Dheva Anrimusthi; Hafizh Briliansyah Prawiranegara	Men's doubles SU5	2018 Asian Para Games
Gold	Leani Ratri Oktila; Khalimatus Sadiyah	Women's doubles SL3–SU5	2018 Asian Para Games
Gold	Hary Susanto; Leani Ratri Oktila	Mixed doubles SL3–SU5	2018 Asian Para Games
Gold	Fredy Setiawan; Dheva Anrimusthi; Hafizh Briliansyah Prawiranegara; Hary Susanto; Suryo Nugroho; Ukun Rukaendi	Men's team SL3–SU5	2018 Asian Para Games
Gold	Dheva Anrimusthi	Men's singles SU5	2022 Asian Para Games
Gold	Dheva Anrimusthi; Hafizh Briliansyah Prawiranegara	Men's doubles SU5	2022 Asian Para Games
Gold	Leani Ratri Oktila; Khalimatus Sadiyah	Women's doubles SL3–SU5	2022 Asian Para Games
Gold	Hikmat Ramdani; Leani Ratri Oktila	Mixed doubles SL3–SU5	2022 Asian Para Games
Gold	Subhan; Rina Marlina	Mixed doubles SH6	2022 Asian Para Games
Silver	Dwiyoko	Men's singles BMSTL2	2010 Asian Para Games
Silver	Hary Susanto	Men's singles BMSTL3	2010 Asian Para Games
Silver	Suryo Nugroho	Men's singles BMSTU5	2010 Asian Para Games
Silver	Dwiyoko; Ryan Yohwari	Men's doubles BMSTU4–5	2010 Asian Para Games
Silver	Oddie Kurnia Dwi Listianto Putra	Men's singles SU5	2014 Asian Para Games
Silver	Dwiyoko; Fredy Setiawan	Men's doubles SL3–SL4	2014 Asian Para Games
Silver	Leani Ratri Oktila; Khalimatus Sadiyah	Women's doubles SL3–SU5	2014 Asian Para Games
Silver	Ukun Rukaendi	Men's singles SL3	2018 Asian Para Games
Silver	Fredy Setiawan	Men's singles SL4	2018 Asian Para Games
Silver	Suryo Nugroho	Men's singles SU5	2018 Asian Para Games
Silver	Leani Ratri Oktila	Women's singles SL4	2018 Asian Para Games
Silver	Suryo Nugroho; Oddie Kurnia Dwi Listianto Putra	Men's doubles SU5	2018 Asian Para Games
Silver	Qonitah Ikhtiar Syakuroh	Women's singles SL3	2022 Asian Para Games
Silver	Leani Ratri Oktila	Women's singles SL4	2022 Asian Para Games
Silver	Rina Marlina	Women's singles SH6	2022 Asian Para Games
Silver	Dwiyoko; Fredy Setiawan	Men's doubles SL3–SL4	2022 Asian Para Games
Silver	Fredy Setiawan; Khalimatus Sadiyah	Mixed doubles SL3–SU5	2022 Asian Para Games
Bronze	Ryan Yohwari	Men's singles BMSTU5	2010 Asian Para Games
Bronze	Imam Kunantoro	Men's singles SU5	2014 Asian Para Games
Bronze	Suryo Nugroho	Men's singles SU5	2014 Asian Para Games
Bronze	Leani Ratri Oktila	Women's singles SL4	2014 Asian Para Games
Bronze	Imam Kunantoro; Suryo Nugroho	Men's doubles SU5	2014 Asian Para Games
Bronze	Hikmat Ramdani	Men's singles SL4	2018 Asian Para Games
Bronze	Oddie Kurnia Dwi Listianto Putra	Men's singles SU5	2018 Asian Para Games
Bronze	Khalimatus Sadiyah	Women's singles SL4	2018 Asian Para Games
Bronze	Hikmat Ramdani; Khalimatus Sadiyah	Mixed doubles SL3–SU5	2018 Asian Para Games
Bronze	Fredy Setiawan	Men's singles SL4	2022 Asian Para Games
Bronze	Suryo Nugroho	Men's singles SU5	2022 Asian Para Games
Bronze	Khalimatus Sadiyah	Women's singles SL4	2022 Asian Para Games
Bronze	Dimas Tri Aji; Subhan	Men's doubles SH6	2022 Asian Para Games

=== Boccia ===
Medal	Name	Event	Games
Gold	Felix Ardi Yudha	Men's individual BC2	2022 Asian Para Games
Silver	Handayani; Felix Ardi Yudha; Muhammad Bintang Satria Herlangga	Mixed team BC1/BC2	2022 Asian Para Games
Bronze	Muhamad Afrizal Syafa	Men's individual BC1	2022 Asian Para Games

=== Bowling ===
Medal	Name	Event	Games
Gold	Elsa Maris	Women's singles TPB4	2018 Asian Para Games
Silver	Andrey Azward; Elsa Maris	Mixed doubles TPB4+TPB4	2018 Asian Para Games

=== Chess ===
Medal	Name	Event	Games
Gold	Hendi Wirawan	Men's individual standard B1	2018 Asian Para Games
Gold	Edy Suryanto; Carsidi; Hendi Wirawan	Men's team standard B1	2018 Asian Para Games
Gold	Edy Suryanto	Men's individual rapid B1	2018 Asian Para Games
Gold	Edy Suryanto; Carsidi; Hendi Wirawan	Men's team rapid B1	2018 Asian Para Games
Gold	Gayuh Satrio; Adji Hartono; M. Haryanto	Men's team rapid B2	2018 Asian Para Games
Gold	Nasip Farta Simanja	Women's individual standard P1	2018 Asian Para Games
Gold	Nasip Farta Simanja; Roslinda Manurung; Yuni	Women's team standard P1	2018 Asian Para Games
Gold	Debi Ariesta	Women's individual standard B1	2018 Asian Para Games
Gold	Debi Ariesta; Tati Karhati; Wilma Margaretha Sinaga	Women's team standard B1	2018 Asian Para Games
Gold	Tati Karhati	Women's individual rapid B1	2018 Asian Para Games
Gold	Debi Ariesta; Tati Karhati; Wilma Margaretha Sinaga	Women's team rapid B1	2018 Asian Para Games
Gold	Tirto	Men's individual standard P1	2022 Asian Para Games
Gold	Alfrets Dien; Maksum Firdaus; Tirto	Men's team standard P1	2022 Asian Para Games
Gold	Indra Yoga	Men's individual standard B1	2022 Asian Para Games
Gold	Prasetyo Fitriyanto; Yadi Sopian; Indra Yoga	Men's team standard B1	2022 Asian Para Games
Gold	Lilis Herna Yulia; Nasip Farta Simanja; Yuni	Women's team standard P1	2022 Asian Para Games
Gold	Lilis Herna Yulia; Nasip Farta Simanja; Yuni	Women's team rapid P1	2022 Asian Para Games
Gold	Aisah Wijayanti Putri Brahmana	Women's individual standard B2/3	2022 Asian Para Games
Gold	Aisah Wijayanti Putri Brahmana; Khairunnisa; Farah Yumna Budiarti	Women's team standard B2/3	2022 Asian Para Games
Gold	Khairunnisa	Women's individual rapid B2/3	2022 Asian Para Games
Gold	Aisah Wijayanti Putri Brahmana; Khairunnisa; Farah Yumna Budiarti	Women's team rapid B2/3	2022 Asian Para Games
Silver	Maksum Firdaus	Men's individual standard P1	2018 Asian Para Games
Silver	Maksum Firdaus; Suhardi Sinaga; Sutikno	Men's team standard P1	2018 Asian Para Games
Silver	Maksum Firdaus; Suhardi Sinaga; Sutikno	Men's team rapid P1	2018 Asian Para Games
Silver	Gayuh Satrio	Men's individual rapid B2/3	2018 Asian Para Games
Silver	Tati Karhati	Women's individual standard B1	2018 Asian Para Games
Silver	Gayuh Satrio	Men's individual rapid B2/3	2022 Asian Para Games
Silver	Gayuh Satrio; Jumadi; Adji Hartono	Men's team rapid B2/3	2022 Asian Para Games
Silver	Yuni	Women's individual standard P1	2022 Asian Para Games
Silver	Lilis Herna Yulia	Women's individual rapid P1	2022 Asian Para Games
Silver	Tita Puspita	Women's individual rapid B1	2022 Asian Para Games
Silver	Wilma Margaretha Sinaga; Yustina Halawa; Tita Puspita	Women's team rapid B1	2022 Asian Para Games
Silver	Khairunnisa	Women's individual standard B2/3	2022 Asian Para Games
Bronze	Edy Suryanto	Men's individual standard B1	2018 Asian Para Games
Bronze	Carsidi	Men's individual rapid B1	2018 Asian Para Games
Bronze	Gayuh Satrio; Adji Hartono; M. Haryanto	Men's team standard B2/3	2018 Asian Para Games
Bronze	Roslinda Manurung	Women's individual standard P1	2018 Asian Para Games
Bronze	Nasip Farta Simanja; Roslinda Manurung; Yuni	Women's team rapid P1	2018 Asian Para Games
Bronze	Aisah Wijayanti Putri Brahmana; Khairunnisa; Tita Puspita	Women's team rapid B2/3	2018 Asian Para Games
Bronze	Tirto	Men's individual rapid P1	2022 Asian Para Games
Bronze	Alfrets Dien; Maksum Firdaus; Tirto	Men's team rapid P1	2022 Asian Para Games
Bronze	Prasetyo Fitriyanto; Yadi Sopian; Indra Yoga	Men's team rapid B1	2022 Asian Para Games
Bronze	Gayuh Satrio	Men's individual standard B2/3	2022 Asian Para Games
Bronze	Gayuh Satrio; Jumadi; Adji Hartono	Men's team standard B2/3	2022 Asian Para Games
Bronze	Nasip Farta Simanja	Women's individual standard P1	2022 Asian Para Games
Bronze	Wilma Margaretha Sinaga; Yustina Halawa; Tita Puspita	Women's team standard B1	2022 Asian Para Games
Bronze	Farah Yumna Budiarti	Women's individual standard B2/3	2022 Asian Para Games

=== Cycling - road ===
Medal	Name	Event	Games
Gold	Fadli Immammuddin	Men's time trial C4–5	2022 Asian Para Games
Gold	Sri Sugiyanti	Women's road race B	2022 Asian Para Games
Gold	Sri Sugiyanti	Women's time trial B	2022 Asian Para Games
Silver	Saipul Anwar	Men's time trial C3	2018 Asian Para Games
Silver	Fadli Immammuddin	Men's time trial C4	2018 Asian Para Games
Silver	Sufyan Saori	Men's time trial C5	2018 Asian Para Games
Silver	Sri Sugiyanti	Women's road race B	2018 Asian Para Games
Silver	Nurfendi	Men's road race B	2022 Asian Para Games
Silver	Nurfendi	Men's time trial B	2022 Asian Para Games
Bronze	Herman Halawa	Men's time trial B	2018 Asian Para Games
Bronze	Martin Losu	Men's road race C5	2018 Asian Para Games
Bronze	Somantri	Men's time trial H4–5	2018 Asian Para Games
Bronze	Somantri	Men's road race H4–5	2018 Asian Para Games
Bronze	Sri Sugiyanti	Women's time trial B	2018 Asian Para Games
Bronze	Ni Kadek Karyadewi	Women's time trial H2–4	2018 Asian Para Games
Bronze	Sufyan Saori	Men's road race C4–5	2022 Asian Para Games

=== Cycling - track ===
Medal	Name	Event	Games
Gold	Fadli Immammuddin	Men's pursuit C4	2018 Asian Para Games
Silver	Saipul Anwar	Men's pursuit C3	2018 Asian Para Games
Silver	Sufyan Saori	Men's pursuit C5	2018 Asian Para Games
Silver	Sri Sugiyanti	Women's pursuit B	2018 Asian Para Games
Silver	Sri Sugiyanti	Women's kilo B	2018 Asian Para Games
Silver	Fadli Immammuddin	Men's 4000 m individual pursuit C4–5	2022 Asian Para Games
Silver	Sri Sugiyanti	Women's 3000 m individual pursuit B	2022 Asian Para Games
Bronze	Herman Halawa	Men's pursuit B	2018 Asian Para Games
Bronze	Habib Shaleh; Fadli Immammuddin; Martin Losu	Men's team sprint C1–5	2018 Asian Para Games
Bronze	Nurfendi	Men's 4000 m individual pursuit pursuit B	2022 Asian Para Games
Bronze	Tifan Abid Alana	Men's 3000 m individual pursuit pursuit C3	2022 Asian Para Games
Bronze	Fadli Immammuddin; Sufyan Saori; Habib Shaleh	Men's 750 m team sprint C1–5	2022 Asian Para Games

=== Fencing ===
Medal	Name	Event	Games
Bronze	Suwarsih; Sri Lestari; Elih; Survaya Dewi Ningrum	Women's team sabre A-B	2018 Asian Para Games

=== Judo ===
Medal	Name	Event	Games
Gold	Roma Siska Tampubolon	Women's +70 kg J1	2022 Asian Para Games
Bronze	Junaedi	Men's 60 kg J1	2022 Asian Para Games
Bronze	Novia Larassati	Women's 48 kg J1	2022 Asian Para Games

=== Lawn bowls ===
Medal	Name	Event	Games
Gold	Mella Windasari	Women's singles B6	2018 Asian Para Games
Gold	Dwi Widiantoro	Mixed singles B1	2018 Asian Para Games
Gold	Julia Verawati	Mixed singles B2	2018 Asian Para Games
Gold	Suwondo	Mixed singles B4	2018 Asian Para Games
Gold	Julia Verawati; Kacung	Mixed pairs B2	2018 Asian Para Games
Gold	Kacung	Men's singles B2	2022 Asian Para Games
Silver	Retnowati Yugia Sibarani	Women's singles B6	2018 Asian Para Games
Silver	Nimatul Fauziyah	Mixed singles B1	2018 Asian Para Games
Silver	Dian Kristiyaningsih	Mixed singles B3	2018 Asian Para Games
Silver	Euis Rahayu Efendi; Suwondo	Mixed pairs B4	2018 Asian Para Games
Silver	Dwi Widiantoro	Men's singles B1	2022 Asian Para Games
Silver	Nimatul Fauziyah	Women's singles B1	2022 Asian Para Games
Silver	Titin	Women's singles B8	2022 Asian Para Games
Bronze	I Wayan Damai	Men's singles B6	2018 Asian Para Games
Bronze	Asep Darmawan	Men's singles B7	2018 Asian Para Games
Bronze	Sudarno	Men's singles B8	2018 Asian Para Games
Bronze	Sriyanti	Women's singles B7	2018 Asian Para Games
Bronze	Mella Windasari; I Wayan Damai	Mixed pairs B6	2018 Asian Para Games
Bronze	Sriyanti; Sukirman	Mixed pairs B7	2018 Asian Para Games
Bronze	Taufik Abdul Rahim	Men's singles B3	2022 Asian Para Games
Bronze	Julia Verawati	Women's singles B2	2022 Asian Para Games
Bronze	Elsa Nur Fitriana	Women's singles B3	2022 Asian Para Games
Bronze	Nimatul Fauziyah; Dwi Widiantoro	Mixed pair B1	2022 Asian Para Games
Bronze	Kacung; Julia Verawati	Mixed pair B2	2022 Asian Para Games

=== Powerlifting ===
Medal	Name	Event	Games
Silver	Ni Nengah Widiasih	Women's 41 kg	2014 Asian Para Games
Silver	Ni Nengah Widiasih	Women's 41 kg	2018 Asian Para Games
Silver	Nurtani Purba	Women's 73 kg	2018 Asian Para Games
Silver	Siti Mahmudah	Women's 79 kg	2018 Asian Para Games
Silver	Sriyanti	Women's +86 kg	2018 Asian Para Games
Silver	Ni Nengah Widiasih	Women's 45 kg	2022 Asian Para Games
Silver	Sriyanti	Women's +86 kg	2022 Asian Para Games
Bronze	Rani Puji Astuti	Women's 50 kg	2014 Asian Para Games
Bronze	Rahayu	Women's 67 kg	2014 Asian Para Games
Bronze	Ni Nengah Widiasih	Women's 79 kg	2014 Asian Para Games
Bronze	Rani Puji Astuti	Women's 55 kg	2018 Asian Para Games
Bronze	Ni Nengah Widiasih	Women's 86 kg	2018 Asian Para Games
Bronze	Siti Mahmudah	Women's 79 kg	2022 Asian Para Games

=== Swimming ===
Medal	Name	Event	Games
Gold	Mulyana	Men's 50 m freestyle S4	2014 Asian Para Games
Gold	Mulyana	Men's 50 m butterfly S4	2014 Asian Para Games
Gold	Marinus Melianus Yowei	Men's 100 m breaststroke SB13	2014 Asian Para Games
Gold	Jendi Pangabean	Men's 100 m backstroke S9	2018 Asian Para Games
Gold	Syuci Indriani	Women's 100 m breaststroke SB14	2018 Asian Para Games
Gold	Syuci Indriani	Women's 200 m individual medley SM14	2018 Asian Para Games
Gold	Jendi Pangabean	Men's 100 m backstroke S9	2022 Asian Para Games
Gold	Maulana Rifky Yavianda	Men's 100 m freestyle S12	2022 Asian Para Games
Gold	Maulana Rifky Yavianda	Men's 100 m backstroke S12	2022 Asian Para Games
Silver	Agus Ngaimin	Men's	2010 Asian Para Games
Silver	Mulyana	Men's 50 m backstroke S4	2014 Asian Para Games
Silver	Tangkilisan Steven Sualang	Men's 100 m backstroke S10	2014 Asian Para Games
Silver	Marinus Melianus Yowei	Men's 50 m freestyle S13	2014 Asian Para Games
Silver	Marinus Melianus Yowei	Men's 100 m freestyle S13	2014 Asian Para Games
Silver	Aris Wibawa	Men's 100 m breaststroke SB7	2018 Asian Para Games
Silver	Guntur	Men's 100 m breaststroke SB8	2018 Asian Para Games
Silver	Jendi Pangabean	Men's 100 m butterfly S9	2018 Asian Para Games
Silver	Syuci Indriani	Women's 100 m butterfly S14	2018 Asian Para Games
Silver	Maulana Rifky Yavianda	Men's 100 m butterfly S12	2022 Asian Para Games
Bronze	Agus Ngaimin	Men's 100 m backstroke S6	2014 Asian Para Games
Bronze	Zaki Zulkarnain	Men's 100 m breaststroke SB8	2018 Asian Para Games
Bronze	Jendi Pangabean	Men's 100 m freestyle S9	2018 Asian Para Games
Bronze	Tangkilisan Steven Sualang	Men's 100 m backstroke S10	2018 Asian Para Games
Bronze	Guntur; Jendi Pangabean; Tangkilisan Steven Sualang; Suriansyah	Men's 4 × 100 m medley relay 34 points	2018 Asian Para Games
Bronze	Syuci Indriani	Women's 200 m freestyle S14	2018 Asian Para Games
Bronze	Syuci Indriani	Women's 100 m breaststroke SB14	2022 Asian Para Games

=== Table tennis ===
Medal	Name	Event	Games
Gold	Agus Sutanto	Men's singles TT 5	2014 Asian Para Games
Gold	David Jacobs	Men's singles TT 10	2014 Asian Para Games
Gold	David Jacobs	Men's singles TT 10	2018 Asian Para Games
Gold	David Jacobs; Komet Akbar	Men's doubles TT 10	2018 Asian Para Games
Gold	Agus Sutanto; Tatok Hardiyanto	Men's doubles TT 4–5	2018 Asian Para Games
Gold	Mohamad Rian Prahasta; Suwarti	Mixed doubles TT 6–8	2018 Asian Para Games
Silver	David Jacobs; Komet Akbar	Men's team TT 9	2014 Asian Para Games
Silver	Mohamad Rian Prahasta; Kusnanto	Men's doubles TT 8–9	2018 Asian Para Games
Silver	Ana Widyasari	Women's singles TT 11	2018 Asian Para Games
Silver	Ana Widyasari; Lola Amalia	Women's doubles TT 11	2018 Asian Para Games
Silver	Banyu Tri Mulyo; Hamida	Mixed doubles TT 6–8	2018 Asian Para Games
Bronze	David Jacobs	Men's singles TT 10	2010 Asian Para Games
Bronze	Ajang Abidin	Men's singles TT 7	2014 Asian Para Games
Bronze	Komet Akbar	Men's singles TT 10	2014 Asian Para Games
Bronze	Sella Dwi Radayana	Women's singles TT 9–10	2014 Asian Para Games
Bronze	Adyos Astan	Men's singles TT 4	2018 Asian Para Games
Bronze	Rahmad Hidayat	Men's singles TT 6	2018 Asian Para Games
Bronze	Sefrianto; Cahyo Pambudi	Men's doubles TT 2–3	2018 Asian Para Games
Bronze	Adyos Astan; Yayang Gunaya	Men's doubles TT 4–5	2018 Asian Para Games
Bronze	Banyu Tri Mulyo; Wawan Widiantoro	Men's doubles TT 8–9	2018 Asian Para Games
Bronze	Sella Dwi Radayana; Hana Resti	Women's doubles TT 6–10	2018 Asian Para Games
Bronze	Sefrianto; Osrita Muslim	Mixed doubles TT 2–3	2018 Asian Para Games
Bronze	Agus Sutanto; Tarsilem	Mixed doubles TT 4–5	2018 Asian Para Games
Bronze	Komet Akbar; Sella Dwi Radayana	Mixed doubles TT 9–10	2018 Asian Para Games
Bronze	Rahmad Hidayat	Men's singles class 6	2022 Asian Para Games
Bronze	Yayang Gunaya; Adyos Astan	Men's doubles class 8	2022 Asian Para Games
Bronze	Hamida	Women's singles class 8	2022 Asian Para Games
Bronze	Hana Resti; Mohamad Rian Prahasta	Mixed doubles class 17–20	2022 Asian Para Games

== Podium sweeps ==
Year	Sport	Event	Gold	Silver	Bronze
2018	Athletics	Women's 100 m T12	Putri Aulia	Ni Made Arianti Putri	Endang Sari Sitorus
2022	Chess	Women's individual standard B2/3	Aisah Wijayanti Putri Brahmana	Khairunnisa	Farah Yumna Budiarti
