= Philippines at the 2022 Asian Para Games =

- IPC code: PHI
- NPC: Paralympic Committee of the Philippines

in Hangzhou, Zhejiang, China 22–28 October 2023
- Competitors: 70 in 12 sports
- Flag bearers: Darry Bernardo (Chess); Angel Otom (Swimming)
- Medals Ranked 9th: Gold 10 Silver 4 Bronze 5 Total 19

Asian Para Games appearances (overview)
- 2010; 2014; 2018; 2022; 2026

Philippines competed at the 2022 Asian Para Games in Hangzhou, Zhejiang, China, from 22 to 28 October 2023. It was to take place in 2022 but due to COVID-19 pandemic cases rising in China the event was postponed and rescheduled to October 2023.

The delegation had 70 athletes with Ral Rosario as the chef de mission.

The Philippines attained its best ever finish in the medal tally, placing ninth with ten golds, four silver, and five bronze medals.

== Competitors ==
The following is the list of number of competitors participating in the Games:

Sport	Men	Women	Total
Archery	3	1	4
Athletics	6	3	9
Badminton	1	1	2
Boccia	2	2	4
Chess	9	4	13
Cycling	3	0	3
Judo	2	0	2
Powerlifting	1	3	4
Swimming	8	1	9
Table tennis	5	2	7
Taekwondo	1	0	1
Wheelchair basketball	12	0	12
Total	53	17	70

== Medalists ==
=== Gold ===
No.	Medal	Name	Sport	Event	Date
1	Gold	Ernie Gawilan	Swimming	Men's 400 m freestyle S7	24 October
2	Gold	Menandro Redor	Chess	Men's individual standard VI – B2/B3	26 October
3	Gold	Cheyzer Mendoza	Chess	Women's individual standard P1	26 October
4	Gold	Darry Bernardo; Menandro Redor; Arman Subaste	Chess	Men's team standard VI – B2/B3	26 October
5	Gold	Jerrold Mangliwan	Athletics	Men's 400 m T52	27 October
6	Gold	Henry Roger Lopez	Chess	Men's individual rapid P1	28 October
7	Gold	Darry Bernardo	Chess	Men's individual rapid VI – B2/B3	28 October
8	Gold	Cheyzer Mendoza	Chess	Women's individual rapid P1	28 October
9	Gold	Henry Roger Lopez; Jasper Rom; Sander Severino	Chess	Men's team rapid P1	28 October
10	Gold	Darry Bernardo; Menandro Redor; Arman Subaste	Chess	Men's team rapid VI – B2/B3	28 October

=== Silver ===
No.	Medal	Name	Sport	Event	Date
1	Silver	Jerrold Mangliwan	Athletics	Men's 100 m T52	24 October
2	Silver	Henry Roger Lopez	Chess	Men's individual standard P1	26 October
3	Silver	Henry Roger Lopez; Jasper Rom; Sander Severino	Chess	Men's team standard P1	26 October
4	Silver	Cheryl Angot; Cheyzer Mendoza; Jean-Lee Nacita	Chess	Women's team rapid P1	28 October

=== Bronze ===
No.	Medal	Name	Sport	Event	Date
1	Bronze	Ernie Gawilan	Swimming	Men's 200 m individual medley SM7	23 October
2	Bronze	Gary Bejino	Swimming	Men's 100 m freestyle S6	23 October
3	Bronze	Cheryl Angot; Cheyzer Mendoza; Jean-Lee Nacita	Chess	Women's team standard P1	26 October
4	Bronze	Sander Severino	Chess	Men's individual standard P1	26 October
5	Bronze	Gary Bejino	Swimming	Men's 400 m freestyle S6	26 October

=== Multiple ===
Name	Sport	Gold	Silver	Bronze	Total
Menandro Redor	Chess	3	0	0	3
Henry Roger Lopez	Chess	2	2	0	4
Cheyzer Mendoza	Chess	2	1	1	4
Darry Bernardo	Chess	2	0	0	2
Arman Subaste	Chess	2	0	0	2
Sander Severino	Chess	1	1	1	3
Jerrold Mangliwan	Athletics	1	1	0	2
Jasper Rom	Chess	1	1	0	2
Ernie Gawilan	Swimming	1	0	1	2
Cheryl Angot	Chess	0	1	1	2
Jean-Lee Nacita	Chess	0	1	1	2
Gary Bejino	Swimming	0	0	2	2

== Medal summary ==
=== By sports ===
Sport	Gold	Silver	Bronze	Total
Chess	8	3	2	13
Athletics	1	1	0	2
Swimming	1	0	3	4
Totals (3 entries)	10	4	5	19

=== By date ===
Day	Date	1st place, gold medalist(s)	2nd place, silver medalist(s)	3rd place, bronze medalist(s)	Total
1	October 23	0	0	2	2
2	October 24	1	1	0	2
3	October 25	0	0	0	0
4	October 26	3	2	3	8
5	October 27	1	0	0	1
6	October 28	5	1	0	6
Total		10	4	5	19

== Archery ==
Men's

Athlete	Event	Ranking round		Round of 32	Round of 16	Quarterfinals	Semifinals	Final / BM	
Athlete	Event	Score	Seed	Opposition Score	Opposition Score	Opposition Score	Opposition Score	Opposition Score	Rank
Arthur Azcuna	Individual compound	651	26 Q	Watanabe (JPN); W 139–138	Wu C.H. (TPE); L 135–143	Did not advance			
Marzel Burgos	Individual compound	656	24 Q	Ngai K.C. (HKG); L 133–138	Did not advance				
Angelo Manangdang	Individual compound	627	27	Did not advance					
Arthur Azcuna; Marzel Burgos	Doubles compound	—N/a		Inkaew; Singpirom (THA); W 152–144	Kumar; Singh (IND); L 153–158	Did not advance			

Women's

Athlete	Event	Ranking round		Round of 16	Quarterfinals	Semifinals	Final / BM	
Athlete	Event	Score	Seed	Opposition Score	Opposition Score	Opposition Score	Opposition Score	Rank
Agustina Bantiloc	Individual compound	652 Q	13	Yavarpoor Shahrbabaki (IRI); L 131–135	Did not advance			

Mixed

Athlete	Event	Round of 16	Quarterfinals	Semifinals	Final / BM	
Athlete	Event	Opposition Score	Opposition Score	Opposition Score	Opposition Score	Rank
Agustina Bantiloc; Marzel Burgos	Team compound	Ateibekov; Kopiratova (KAZ); L 144–144	Did not advance			

== Athletics ==
Jerrold Mangliwan won a silver medal at the 100m T52 event.

Men's road & track

Athlete	Event	Heats		Final	
Athlete	Event	Result	Rank	Result	Rank
Arman Dino	100m T47	11.60	3 Q	11.60	8
Arman Dino	400m T47	55.45	4 q	55.42	7
Jerrold Mangliwan	100m T52	—N/a		18.65 PB	2nd place, silver medalist(s)
Jerrold Mangliwan	400m T52	—N/a		1:01.54 PB	1st place, gold medalist(s)
Ronn-Russel Mitra	400m T20	53.46	4 q	52.92 PB	5
Daniel Enderes Jr.	1500m T20	—N/a		4:37.43 PB	6
King James Reyes	1500m T46	—N/a		4:15.12 PB	6

Men's field

Athlete	Event	Final	
Athlete	Event	Result	Rank
Ronn-Russel Mitra	Long jump T20	6.16 PB	6
Andrei Kuizon	Discus throw F54/55/56	11.38	10
Andrei Kuizon	Javelin throw F55	19.80	9
Andrei Kuizon	Shot put F55	7.25	4

Women's field

Athlete	Event	Final	
Athlete	Event	Result	Rank
Rosalie Torrefiel	Discus throw F11	20.17 PB	7
Cendy Asusano	Discus throw F54/55	13.87 SB	4
Cendy Asusano	Javelin throw F54	14.23	4
Cendy Asusano	Shot put F54	3.53	9
Jesebel Tordecilla	Discus throw F54/55	13.24	7
Jesebel Tordecilla	Javelin throw F56	12.88	8

== Badminton ==
Men

Athlete	Event	Group Stage	Rank	Quarterfinals	Semifinals	Final / BM	Rank
Athlete	Event	Opposition Result	Rank	Opposition Result	Opposition Result	Opposition Result	Rank
Antonio Dela Cruz Jr.	Singles SU50	Shi S. (CHN); L (12–21, 9–21)	3	Did not advance			
Antonio Dela Cruz Jr.	Singles SU50	Cheah L.H. (MAS); L (15–21, 9–21)	3	Did not advance			

Women

Athlete	Event	Group Stage	Rank	Quarterfinals	Semifinals	Final / BM	Rank
Athlete	Event	Opposition Result	Rank	Opposition Result	Opposition Result	Opposition Result	Rank
Paz Lita	Singles WH2	Hoàng (VIE); L (10–21, 7–21)	4	Did not advance			
Paz Lita	Singles WH2	Lee S. (KOR); L (4–21, 7–21)	4	Did not advance			
Paz Lita	Singles WH2	Wetwithan (THA); L (5–21, 7–21)	4	Did not advance			

== Boccia ==
Athlete	Event	Group Stage				Quarterfinal	Semifinal	Final / BM	
Athlete	Event	Opposition Score	Opposition Score	Opposition Score	Rank	Opposition Score	Opposition Score	Opposition Score	Rank
David Gonzaga	Men's individual BC2	Vongsa (THA); L 0–14	Saifulifram (MAS); L 1–6	Lee C. (KOR); L 0–8	4	Did not advance			
Ramon Rey Apilado	Men's individual BC4	Somsanuk (THA); L 0–14	Jang S. (KOR); L 2–12	—N/a	3	Did not advance			
Daniella Catacutan	Women's individual BC1	Phromsiri (THA); L 0–8	Leung M.Y. (HKG); L 3–6	Handayani (INA); L 6–8	4	Did not advance			
Michelle Fernandez	Women's individual BC4	Phonsila (THA); L 1–12	Gupta (IND); L 2–5	—N/a	3	Did not advance			

== Chess ==
The Philippines entered 13 chess players.

Men

Athlete	Event	Round 1	Round 2	Round 3	Round 4	Round 5	Round 6	Round 7	Final Score	Rank
Henry Roger Lopez	Individual standard P1	Sripakdee (THA); W 1–0	Ayapov (KAZ); W 1–0	Kutwal (IND); D 0.5–0.5	Firdaus (INA); W 1–0	Severino (PHI); L 0–1	Kazamian Aski (IRI); W 1–0	Sonom (MGL); W 1–0	5.5	2nd place, silver medalist(s)
Jasper Rom	Individual standard P1	Khoonmee (THA); W 1–0	Kachian (IRI); W 1–0	Tirto (INA); D 0.5–0.5	Severino (PHI); L 0–1	Kazamian Aski (IRI); D 0.5–0.5	Dien (INA); D 0.5–0.5	Ibraimov (KGZ); D 0.5–0.5	4	9
Sander Severino	Individual standard P1	Sonom (MGL); W 1–0	Kazamian Aski (IRI); W 1–0	Firdaus (INA); D 0.5–0.5	Rom (PHI); W 1–0	Lopez (PHI); W 1–0	Kutwal (IND); D 0.5–0.5	Tirto (INA); L 0–1	5	3rd place, bronze medalist(s)
Henry Roger Lopez	Individual rapid P1	Sripakdee (THA); W 1–0	Zakeri (IRI); W 1–0	Ganthimeri (IND); W 1–0	Kazamian Aski (IRI); D 0.5–0.5	Tirto (INA); D 0.5–0.5	Severino (PHI); W 1–0	Rom (PHI); W 1–0	6	1st place, gold medalist(s)
Jasper Rom	Individual rapid P1	Ibraimov (KGZ); W 1–0	Kim M. (KOR); L 0–1	Khoonmee (THA); W 1–0	Sonom (MGL); W 1–0	Rakhatbekov (KGZ); W 1–0	Kazamian Aski (IRI); D 0.5–0.5	Lopez (PHI); L 0–1	4.5	6
Sander Severino	Individual rapid P1	Kachian (IRI); D 0.5–0.5	Kutwal (IND); D 0.5–0.5	Zakeri (IRI); W 1–0	Soltanov (KAZ); D 0.5–0.5	Kim M. (KOR); W 1–0	Lopez (PHI); L 0–1	Ibraimov (KGZ); W 1–0	4.5	5
Darry Bernardo	Individual standard VI – B2/B3	Mosleh Rasht Abadi (IRI); W 1–0	Satrio (INA); L 0–1	Bagheri (IRI); W 1–0	Kishan (IND); L 0–1	Yuan S. (CHN); W 1–0	Atabaýew (TKM); L 0–1	Hartono (INA); D 0.5–0.5	3.5	8
Menandro Redor	Individual standard VI – B2/B3	Gan-ochir (MGL); W 1–0	Hartono (INA); W 1–0	Kishan (IND); D 0.5–0.5	Satrio (INA); W 1–0	Rabbi Khorasgani (IRI); D 0.5–0.5	Subaste (PHI); W 1–0	Atabaýew (TKM); D 0.5–0.5	5.5	1st place, gold medalist(s)
Arman Subaste	Individual standard VI – B2/B3	Jumadi (INA); L 0–1	Gombo (MGL); W 1–0	Mosleh Rasht Abadi (IRI); W 1–0	Hartono (INA); W 1–0	Kishan (IND); D 0.5–0.5	Redor (PHI); L 0–1	Hamdamov (TJK); D 0.5–0.5	4	7
Darry Bernardo	Individual rapid VI – B2/B3	Kimsanboev (UZB); D 0.5–0.5	Jumadi (INA); W 1–0	Hamdamov (TJK); W 1–0	Kishan (IND); W 1–0	Satrio (INA); D 0.5–0.5	Subaste (PHI); W 1–0	Hartono (INA); W 1–0	6	1st place, gold medalist(s)
Menandro Redor	Individual rapid VI – B2/B3	Gan-ochir (MGL); W 1–0	Joshi (IND); L 0–1	Kimsanboev (UZB); W 1–0	Mosleh Rasht Abadi (IRI); W 1–0	Hartono (INA); W 1–0	Satrio (INA); W 1–0	Hamdamov (TJK); L 0–1	5	8
Arman Subaste	Individual rapid VI – B2/B3	Wang M. (CHN); W 1–0	Atabaýew (TKM); L 0–1	Rabbi Khorasgani (IRI); D 0.5–0.5	Bagheri (IRI); D 0.5–0.5	Yang Y. (CHN); W 1–0	Bernardo (PHI); L 0–1	Jumadi (INA); W 1–0	4	9
Cecilio Bilog	Individual standard VI – B1	Ching (PHI); L 0–1	Alikhanov (KAZ); W 1–0	Đinh T.S. (VIE); W 1–0	Inani (IND); L 0–1	Alizadeh (IRI); L 0–1	Saenpoch (THA); W 1–0	Makwana (IND); L 0–1	3	14
Francis Ching	Individual standard VI – B1	Bilog (PHI); W 1–0	Lê V.V. (VIE); L 0–1	Sopian (INA); L 0–1	Sarmiento (PHI); W 1–0	Đinh T.S. (VIE); W 1–0	Inani (IND); L 0–1	Fitriyanto (INA); W 1–0	4	9
Rodolfo Sarmiento	Individual standard VI – B1	Wang Z. (CHN); W 1–0	Ghoorchibeygi (IRI); L 0–1	Đào T.K. (VIE); L 0–1	Ching (PHI); L 0–1	Ulzii-Ochir (MGL); W 1–0	Bye; W 1–0	Alikhanov (KAZ); L 0–1	3	16
Cecilio Bilog	Individual rapid VI – B1	Alikhanov (KAZ); W 1–0	Abdullaev (UZB); L 0–1	Ghoorchibeygi (IRI); L 0–1	Ulzii-Ochir (MGL); W 1–0	Saenpoch (THA); W 1–0	Alizadeh (IRI); L 0–1	Fitriyanto (INA); D 0.5–0.5	3.5	12
Francis Ching	Individual rapid VI – B1	Đào T.K. (VIE); W 1–0	Lê V.V. (VIE); D 0.5–0.5	Inani (IND); L 0–1	Sarmiento (PHI); W 1–0	Fitriyanto (INA); W 1–0	Abdullaev (UZB); L 0–1	Yoga (INA); L 0–1	3.5	11
Rodolfo Sarmiento	Individual rapid VI – B1	Ulzii-Ochir (MGL); W 1–0	Yoga (INA); L 0–1	Saenpoch (THA); L 0–1	Ching (PHI); L 0–1	Wang Z. (CHN); L 0–1	Bye; W 1–0	Erkaboev (TJK); L 0–1	2	21
Henry Roger Lopez; Jasper Rom; Sander Severino	Team standard P1	—N/a							14.5	2nd place, silver medalist(s)
Henry Roger Lopez; Jasper Rom; Sander Severino	Team rapid P1	—N/a							15	1st place, gold medalist(s)
Darry Bernardo; Menandro Redor; Arman Subaste	Team standard VI – B2/B3	—N/a							12	1st place, gold medalist(s)
Darry Bernardo; Menandro Redor; Arman Subaste	Team rapid VI – B2/B3	—N/a							15	1st place, gold medalist(s)
Cecilio Bilog; Francis Ching; Rodolfo Sarmiento	Team standard VI – B1	—N/a							10	5
Cecilio Bilog; Francis Ching; Rodolfo Sarmiento	Team rapid VI – B1	—N/a							9	5

Women

Athlete	Event	Round 1	Round 2	Round 3	Round 4	Round 5	Round 6	Round 7	Final Score	Rank
Cheryl Angot	Individual standard P1	Kudainazarov (KGZ); W 1–0	Mendoza (PHI); L 0–1	Raju Prema (IND); W 1–0	Mehta (IND); W 1–0	Aby (IND); L 0–1	Yulia (INA); L 0–1	Simanja (INA); L 0–1	3	10
Cheyzer Mendoza	Individual standard P1	Yuni (INA); W 1–0	Angot (PHI); W 1–0	Đoàn T.H. (VIE); D 0.5–0.5	Yulia (INA); W 1–0	Simanja (INA); W 1–0	Aby (IND); W 1–0	Mijgee (MGL); L 0–1	5.5	1st place, gold medalist(s)
Jean-Lee Nacita	Individual standard P1	Zhang Y. (CHN); W 1–0	Simanja (INA); L 0–1	Mehta (IND); L 0–1	Kudainazarov (KGZ); W 1–0	Mijgee (MGL); L 0–1	Zhang X. (CHN); L 0–1	Raju Prema (IND); D 0.5–0.5	2.5	14
Cheryl Angot	Individual rapid P1	Mehta (IND); W 1–0	Zhang Y. (CHN); W 1–0	Aby (IND); W 1–0	Simanja (INA); W 1–0	Mendoza (PHI); D 0.5–0.5	Trần T.B.T. (VIE); L 0–1	Yulia (INA); L 0–1	4.5	5
Cheyzer Mendoza	Individual rapid P1	Yuni (INA); L 0–1	Zhang X. (CHN); W 1–0	Chen F. (CHN); W 1–0	Đoàn T.H. (VIE); W 1–0	Angot (PHI); D 0.5–0.5	Simanja (INA); W 1–0	Trần T.B.T. (VIE); W 1–0	5.5	1st place, gold medalist(s)
Jean-Lee Nacita	Individual rapid P1	Trần T.B.T. (VIE); L 0–1	Nguyễn T.K. (VIE); L 0–1	Mehta (IND); W 1–0	Zhang Y. (CHN); L 1–0	Bye; W 1–0	Đoàn T.H. (VIE); L 0–1	Chen F. (CHN); L 0–1	2	17
Maria Teresa Bilog	Individual standard VI – B2/B3	Naghavi Mandi (IRI); L 0–1	Nguyễn T.M.L. (VIE); L 0–1	Abdykadyrova (KGZ); W 1–0	Amantayeva (KAZ); W 1–0	Pande (IND); L 0–1	Long H. (CHN); W 1–0	Jumonova (UZB); L 0–1	3	17
Maria Teresa Bilog	Individual rapid VI – B2/B3	Naghavi Mandi (IRI); L 0–1	Batsukh (MGL); W 1–0	Jumonova (UZB); L 0–1	Botkate (THA); W 1–0	Rahimzadeh (IRI); L 0–1	Khuijanthuek (THA); L 0–1	Bye; W 1–0	3	17
Cheryl Angot; Cheyzer Mendoza; Jean-Lee Nacita	Team standard P1	—N/a							11	3rd place, bronze medalist(s)
Cheryl Angot; Cheyzer Mendoza; Jean-Lee Nacita	Team rapid P1	—N/a							12	2nd place, silver medalist(s)

== Cycling ==
=== Road ===
Men

Athlete	Event	Result	Rank
Artus Bucay	C4-5 time trial	28:24.04	10
Nikko Peralta	C4-5 time trial	27:08.14	5
Arthus Bucay	Road race C4-5	1:46.28	6
Nikko Peralta	Road race C4-5	1:59.13	14
Godfrey Taberna	Road race C4-5	2:00.53	16

=== Track ===
Men

Athlete	Event	Heats		Final	
Athlete	Event	Result	Rank	Result	Rank
Nikko Peralta	4000m individual pursuit C4-5	5:27.185	10	Did not advance	

== Judo ==
Athlete	Event	Round of 16	Quarterfinals	Semifinals	Repechage 1	Repechage 2	Final / BM	
Athlete	Event	Opposition Result	Opposition Result	Opposition Result	Opposition Result	Opposition Result	Opposition Result	Rank
Deterson Omas	Men's −73 kg	Nurdauletov (KAZ); L 0–10	Did not advance		Suranov (KGZ); L 0s1–10s1	Did not advance		
Carlito Agustin Jr.	Men's −90 kg	Matsumoto (JPN); L 0–10	Did not advance					

== Powerlifting ==
The Philippines qualified three female powerlifters for the Asian Para Games by competing at the 2023 World Para Powerlifting Championships in Dubai, United Arab Emirates.

Men

Athlete	Event	Attempt 1	Attempt 2	Attempt 3	Total	Rank
Romeo Tayawa	-54 kg	120	125	130	~~125~~	7

Women

Athlete	Event	Attempt 1	Attempt 2	Attempt 3	Total	Rank
Marydol Pamati-an	-41 kg	68	74	~~76~~	74	6
Achelle Guion	-45 kg	80	83	~~85~~	83	4
Adeline Dumapong-Ancheta	+86 kg	90	~~100~~	~~106~~	90	7

== Swimming ==
The Philippines clinched at least three bronze medals courtesy of Ernie Gawilan and Gary Bejino. This was followed by a gold medal from Gawilan.

Men

Athlete	Event	Heats		Final	
Athlete	Event	Result	Rank	Result	Rank
Marco Tinamisan	50m backstroke S4	—N/a		1:41.00	7
Marco Tinamisan	50m freestyle S4	—N/a		50.32	4
Marco Tinamisan	100m freestyle S4	—N/a		1:46.94	4
Marco Tinamisan	200m freestyle S5	3:50.35	6	Did not advance	
Gary Bejino	50m butterfly S6	—N/a		34.49	5
Gary Bejino	100m freestyle S6	1:12.61	2 Q	1:12.76	3rd place, bronze medalist(s)
Gary Bejino	400m freestyle S6	—N/a		5:44.31	3rd place, bronze medalist(s)
Ernie Gawilan	100m backstroke S7	—N/a		1:23.40	5
Ernie Gawilan	400m freestyle S7	5:11.16	1 Q	4:58.29	1st place, gold medalist(s)
Ernie Gawilan	200m individual medley SM7	—N/a		2:52.82	3rd place, bronze medalist(s)
Edwin Villanueva	400m freestyle S8	—N/a		6:11.28	8
Edwin Villanueva	200m individual medley SM8	DSQ		Did not advance	
Arnel Aba	50m freestyle S9	32.55	5	Did not advance	
Arnel Aba	100m butterfly S9	1:21.24	6	Did not advance	
Arnel Aba	400m freestyle S9	5:24.81	5 R	Did not advance	
Roland Sabido	100m backstroke S9	1:16.62	6 R	Did not advance	
Roland Sabido	400m freestyle S9	5:24.02	4 Q	5:15.15	8
Roland Sabido	200m individual medley SM9	2:55.96	5	Did not advance	
Muhaimin Ulag	50m freestyle S9	31.82	5	Did not advance	
Muhaimin Ulag	100m breaststroke SB9	1:24.25	7	Did not advance	
Ariel Alegarbes	100m backstroke S14	1:06.16	3 Q	1:04.36	5
Ariel Alegarbes	100m butterfly S14	1:01.04	4 Q	1:02.03	8
Ariel Alegarbes	200m individual medley SM14	2:24.76	4 Q	2:27.76	8

Women

Athlete	Event	Heats		Final	
Athlete	Event	Result	Rank	Result	Rank
Angel Otom	50m butterfly S6	—N/a		45.80	7
Angel Otom	50m freestyle S6	43.19	4 Q	42.65	8
Angel Otom	200m freestyle S5	—N/a		3:32.34	4

== Table tennis ==
The Philippines entered five men and two women in table tennis.

Men

Athlete	Event	Group Stage				Round of 16	Quarterfinals	Semifinals	Final / BM	
Athlete	Event	Opposition Result	Opposition Result	Opposition Result	Rank	Opposition Result	Opposition Result	Opposition Result	Opposition Result	Rank
Smith Billy Cartera	Individual C4	Chaiwut (THA); L 0–3	Yoy (CAM); W 3–1	—N/a	2 Q	Astan (INA); L 1–3	Did not advance			
Racleo Martinez Jr.	Individual C4	Shi Y. (CHN); L 0–3	Otepov (KAZ); W 3–0	Gunaya (INA); L 0–3	3	Did not advance				
Andrew Kevin Arandia	Individual C8	Mulyo (INA); L 0–3	Tateishi (JPN); L 0–3	—N/a	3	Did not advance				
Benedicto Gaela	Individual C9	Ho K.S. (HKG); L 0–3	Liu C. (CHN); L 0–3	Silva (SRI); L 0–3	4	Did not advance				
Linard Sultan	Individual C9	Chee C. (MAS); L 1–3	Chougule (IND); L 0–3	Fan Y. (CHN); L 1–3	4	Did not advance				
Smith Billy Cartera; Racleo Martinez Jr.	Doubles CMD8	—N/a				Chaiwut; Glinbancheun (THA); L 0–3	Did not advance			
Benedicto Gaela; Linard Sultan	Doubles CMD18	—N/a				Ho K.S. Wong C.Y. (HKG); L 0–3	Did not advance			

Women

Athlete	Event	Group Stage				Round of 16	Quarterfinals	Semifinals	Final / BM	
Athlete	Event	Opposition Result	Opposition Result	Opposition Result	Rank	Opposition Result	Opposition Result	Opposition Result	Opposition Result	Rank
Angela Querebin	Individual C7	Xiong G. (CHN); L 0–3	Yerzhankyzy (KAZ); L 0–3	—N/a	3	Did not advance				
Jhona Peña	Individual C9	Chiu K.S. (HKG); L 0–3	U C.H. (MAC); L 2–3	—N/a	3	Did not advance				
Jhona Peña; Angela Querebin	Doubles CWD20	—N/a				Radayana; Resti (INA); L 0–3	Did not advance			

Mixed

Athlete	Event	Round of 32	Round of 16	Quarterfinals	Semifinals	Final / BM	
Athlete	Event	Opposition Result	Opposition Result	Opposition Result	Opposition Result	Opposition Result	Rank
Benedicto Gaela; Jhona Peña	Doubles CXD17-20	Prahasta; Resti (INA); L 1–3	Did not advance				
Angela Querebin; Linard Sultan	Doubles CXD17-20	Makhulbekov; Yerzhaykyny (KAZ); L 2–3	Did not advance				

== Taekwondo ==
The Philippines qualified one male taekwondo athlete. Ganapin would get disqualified in the repecharge for unsportsmanlike behavior.

Athlete	Event	Quarterfinals	Semifinals	Repechage 1	Repechage 2	Final / BM	
Athlete	Event	Opposition Result	Opposition Result	Opposition Result	Opposition Result	Opposition Result	Rank
Allain Ganapin	Men's –80 kg	Dombayev (KAZ); L 3–7	—N/a	Kaziyev (KAZ); L DQB	Did not advance		

== Wheelchair basketball ==
The Philippine men's national team qualified for the Asian Para Games by virtue of finishing third at the 2023 IWBF Asia-Oceania Championship in Thailand.

Roster

The Philippines submitted a 12-man roster for the games.

Philippines men's national wheelchair basketball team – 2022 Asian Para Games roster
Players
Coaches

No.	Name	Age – Date of birth	Pts.
4	Mark Vincent Aguilar	23 – 23 June 2000	4.0
5	John Rey Escalante	31 – 29 August 1992	4.0
6	Kenneth Christopher Tapia	28 – 5 April 1995	3.5
8	Alfie Cabañog	33 – 20 February 1990	4.0
10	Jannil Cañete	33 – 19 January 1990	1.0
11	Cleford Trocino	36 – 4 May 1987	1.0
12	Marlon Nacita	41 – 24 September 1982	2.0
13	Freddie Magdayo	32 – 20 October 1990	3.5
14	Jefferson Legacion	43 – 13 July 1980	4.0
16	Kyle Carlo Carandang	21 – 29 August 2002	1.5
17	Anthony Aze Demesa	19 – 25 October 2003	3.5
18	Moises Escobar	38 – 4 May 1985	4.0

Head coach

- (Philippines) Vernon Perea

Assistant coach(es)

- (Philippines) Yolanda Hernandez
- (Philippines) Juanito Mingarine
- (Philippines) Harry Solanoy

Legend

- Age – describes age
  on 19 October 2023

Summary

Team	Event	Group Stage					Classification	Semifinals	Final / BM	
Team	Event	Opposition Score	Opposition Score	Opposition Score	Opposition Score	Rank	Opposition Score	Opposition Score	Opposition Score	Rank
Philippines men's	Men's tournament	China; L 34–83	Afghanistan; L 49–53	Thailand; L 32–70	Iran; L 32–90	5	Kuwait; W 54–51	Did not advance		9

Preliminary Rounds – Group A

Pos	Team	Pld	W	L	PF	PA	PD	Pts	Qualification
1	Iran	4	4	0	308	157	+151	8	Advance to Semi-finals
2	China (H)	4	3	1	278	207	+71	7	Advance to Semi-finals
3	Thailand	4	2	2	278	207	+71	6	Qualified for classification 5th–8th
4	Afghanistan	4	1	3	172	316	−144	5	Qualified for classification 5th–8th
5	Philippines	4	0	4	147	296	−149	4	Qualified for the Ninth place game

Source: HAPGOC
Rules for classification: 1) Points; 2) Head-to-head results; 3) Points difference; 4) Points scored.
(H) Hosts

19 October
16:15 UTC+8

Report

China	83–34	Philippines
Scoring by quarter: 14–6, 24–11, 23–13, 22–4

20 October
11:45 UTC+8

Report

Philippines	49–53	Afghanistan
Scoring by quarter: 8–17, 10–13, 15–9, 16–14

21 October
11:00 UTC+8

Report

Thailand	70–32	Philippines
Scoring by quarter: 16–16, 18–2, 11–6, 25–8

24 October
19:00 UTC+8

Report

Philippines	32–90	Iran
Scoring by quarter: 2–26, 15–26, 10–23, 5–15

Classification – Ninth place game

26 October
9:30 UTC+8

Report

Philippines	54–51	Kuwait
Scoring by quarter: 14–16, 19–15, 10–11, 11–9
