= Kanami Furukawa =

Japanese para table tennis player

Personal information
- Native name: 古川佳奈美
- Born: 27 July 1997 (age 28) Fukuoka, Japan

Sport
- Sport: Table tennis
- Disability class: 11
Medal record
Women's para table tennis
Representing Japan
Paralympic Games
Bronze medal – third place	2024 Paris	Singles C11
World Championships
Bronze medal – third place	2018 Laško	Singles C11
Asian Para Games
Silver medal – second place	2022 Hangzhou	Doubles C22
Bronze medal – third place	2022 Hangzhou	Mixed doubles C22
Bronze medal – third place	2022 Hangzhou	Singles C11

Kanami Furukawa (Japanese: 古川佳奈美; born 27 July 1997) is a Japanese para table tennis player. She competed at the 2020 Summer Paralympics and the 2024 Summer Paralympics; in 2024, she won the bronze medal in the women's individual C11 event.
