= 2022 Asian Para Games medal table =

The 2022 Asian Para Games, also known as the 4th Asian Para Games and commonly known as the Hangzhou 2022 Asian Para Games, was a multi-sport event that paralleled the 2022 Asian Games which was held for Asian athletes with disabilities in Hangzhou, Zhejiang, China from 22 to 28 October 2023.

Kyrgyzstan, Nepal and Yemen won their first ever Asian Para Games medals.

== Medal table ==
* Host nation (China)

2022 Asian Para Games medal table
Rank	NPC	Gold	Silver	Bronze	Total
1	China*	214	167	140	521
2	Iran	44	46	41	131
3	Japan	42	49	59	150
4	South Korea	30	33	40	103
5	Indonesia	29	30	37	96
6	India	27	32	49	108
7	Thailand	27	26	55	108
8	Uzbekistan	25	24	30	79
9	Philippines	10	4	5	19
10	Hong Kong	8	15	24	47
11	Kazakhstan	8	12	21	41
12	Malaysia	7	15	17	39
13	Chinese Taipei	4	4	12	20
14	United Arab Emirates	4	4	3	11
15	Jordan	4	2	1	7
16	Iraq	3	7	4	14
17	Singapore	3	3	2	8
18	Sri Lanka	2	5	4	11
19	Saudi Arabia	2	4	3	9
20	Mongolia	2	3	3	8
21	Oman	2	2	0	4
22	Vietnam	1	10	9	20
23	Kyrgyzstan	1	2	1	4
24	Pakistan	1	0	0	1
25	Timor-Leste	0	1	0	1
26	Myanmar	0	0	3	3
27	Syria	0	0	2	2
28	Bahrain	0	0	1	1
28	Kuwait	0	0	1	1
28	Macau	0	0	1	1
28	Nepal	0	0	1	1
28	Qatar	0	0	1	1
28	Yemen	0	0	1	1
Totals (33 entries)		500	500	571	1,571

== Changes ==
List of official changes by country
NOC	Gold	Silver	Bronze	Net Change
India	−1	+1	−2	−2
Indonesia	0	0	+1	+1
Iran	+1	-1	+1	+1

Men's Javelin Throw Throw-F55 28 Oct :

India - Iran - India - Original results

Iran - India - Iran - After changes

Men's Discus Throw-F54/55/56 24 Oct :

India - India - India - Original results

India - India - Indonesia - After changes

=== Doping ===
Neeraj Yadav lose 2 gold medals. YADAV Neeraj 5th in Men's Shot Put-F55.

Men's Javelin Throw Throw-F55 :

1. India YADAV Neeraj
2. Iran ZAKER Zafar
3. India TEK Chand
4. Iran AMIRI Hamed
5. India MANIHAS
6. Kazakhstan AITMYRZAYEV Mukan
7. UAE YOUNAS Omair Muhammad Muhammad
8. Brunei Darussalam HAJI Juma'at Shari

Men's Discus Throw-F54/55/56 :

1. India YADAV Neeraj
2. India KATHUNIYA Yogesh
3. India MUTHURAJA
4. Indonesia SAPUTRA Riadi
5. UAE YOUNAS Omair Muhammad Muhammad
6. Chinese Taipei LIU Wei-chi
7. Kazakhstan AITMYRZAYEV Mukan
8. Brunei Darussalam HAJI Juma'at Shari

=== Timing ===
Women's Javelin Throw-F56 (2023-10-23):

Motaghian snatched the gold and the silver went to Zeinab Moradi, another Iranian. They lose medals after late with china protest.

1. China LIN Sitong
2. Uzbekistan SEMYONOVA Natalya
3. Bahrain ALOMARI Rooba Yusuf Mohamed Awad
4. China DONG Feixia
5. India SHARMA Poonam
6. Vietnam TRUONG Bich Van
7. India FATIMA Khatoon
8. Philippines TORDECILLA Jesebel
