= Lawn bowls at the 2022 Asian Para Games =

- Location: Hangzhou, China
- Dates: 21–27 October

Lawn bowls at the 2022 Asian Para Games in China was held between 21 and 27 October 2023.

== Nations ==
89 (47+42) from 9 nation

1. China (12)
2. Hong Kong (12)
3. India (12)
4. Indonesia (12)
5. Japan (2)
6. South Korea (12)
7. Malaysia (10)
8. Singapore (5)
9. Thailand (12)

== Entries ==
Events	M/W B1	M/W B2	M/W B3	M/W B4	M/W B5	M/W B6	M/W B7	M/W B8
Men's Singles	5	6	8	0	0	11	11	6
Women's Singles	5	5	7	0	0	10	9	6
Mixed Pairs	5	5	7	0	0	9	10	6

24 events but 6 events in B4 and B5 was cancelled because of lack of competitors.

== Medal table ==
Rank	NPC	Gold	Silver	Bronze	Total
1	China (CHN)	7	4	3	14
2	South Korea (KOR)	4	4	2	10
3	Thailand (THA)	4	1	3	8
4	Hong Kong (HKG)	2	3	2	7
5	Indonesia (INA)	1	3	5	9
6	Malaysia (MAS)	0	2	2	4
7	Singapore (SIN)	0	1	1	2
Totals (7 entries)		18	18	18	54

== Medalists ==
Event	Class	Gold	Silver	Bronze
Men's singles	B1	Weng Feibiao; China	Dwi Widiantoro; Indonesia	Chen Guoqiang; China
Men's singles	B2	Kacung; Indonesia	Muhamad Ayub; Malaysia	Rockey Li Chi Ming; Hong Kong
Men's singles	B3	Song Jinqi; China	Iron Tang Tsz Long; Hong Kong	Taufik Abdul Karim; Indonesia
Men's singles	B6	Hwang Dong-gi; South Korea	Xu Yonggang; China	Im Chun-kyu; South Korea
Men's singles	B7	Choochat Sukjarern; Thailand	Haszely Elias; Malaysia	Mohamad Khirmern; Singapore
Men's singles	B8	Jeong Jae-hong; South Korea	Jeong Sang-cheol; South Korea	Anek Banjerdkitkul; Thailand
Women's singles	B1	Methini Wongchomphu; Thailand	Nimatul Fauziyah; Indonesia	Huang Lingling; China
Women's singles	B2	Zhu Xiali; China	Tang Shun Yee; Hong Kong	Julia Verawati; Indonesia
Women's singles	B3	Kong Qiaoli; China	Wu Yanfeng; China	Elsa Nur Fitriana; Indonesia
Women's singles	B6	Somwang Chamnanpana; Thailand	Faridah Salleh; Singapore	Rebecca Chan Yuet Lui; Hong Kong
Women's singles	B7	Wu Man Ying; Hong Kong	Nimit Karatak; Thailand	Jariah Zakaria; Malaysia
Women's singles	B8	Kim Seung-hui; South Korea	Titin Titin; Indonesia	Samorn Sombatdee; Thailand
Mixed pair	B1	China; Fan Hongyan; Chen Guoqiang	China; Weng Feibiao; Huang Lingling	Indonesia; Nimatul Fauziyah; Dwi Widiantoro
Mixed pair	B2	Hong Kong; Rockey Li Chi Ming; Tang Shun Yee	China; Zhu Xiali; Feng Shugui	Indonesia; Kacung Kacung; Julia Verawati
Mixed pair	B3	China; Song Jinqi; Kong Qiaoli	Hong Kong; Iron Tang Tsz Long; Chan Ka Man	China; Wu Yanfeng; Zhang Huatyong
Mixed pair	B6	South Korea; Lee Mi-jeong; Im Chun-kyu	South Korea; Kang Jae-bun; Hwang Dong-gi	Thailand; Prayat Praman; Somwang Chamnanpana
Mixed pair	B7	China; Zhou Xiaofang; Xu Yonggang	South Korea; Song Myeung-jun; Lee Doo-yi	Malaysia; Jariah Zakaria; Haszely Elias
Mixed pair	B8	Thailand; Anek Banjerdkitkul; Samorn Sombatdee	South Korea; Woo Myung-ja; Jeong Jae-hong	South Korea; Kim Seung-hui; Jeong Sang-cheol
