= Table tennis at the 2022 Asian Para Games =

Para table tennis at the 2022 Asian Para Games
- Location: , , China
- Dates: 22–27 October

Para Table Tennis at the 2022 Asian Para Games was held Hangzhou, China between 22 and 27 October 2023.

== Events ==
36 events:

MS (11 event): 1-2-3-4-5-6-7-8-9-10-11

MD (5 event) : 4-8-14-18-22

WS (10 event): (1-2)-3-4-5-6-7-8-9-10-11

WD (5 event): 5-10-14-20-22

XD (5 event): 4-(7-10)-14-(17-20)-22

== Entries ==
=== Singles ===
1-2 in women was merged.

Events	M/W 1	M/W 2	M/W 3	M/W 4	M/W 5	M/W 6	M/W 7	M/W 8	M/W 9	M/W 10	M/W 11
Men's	5	13	16	23	14	7	13	15	17	10	15
Women's	0	6	8	12	6	10	9	7	13	9	13

=== Doubles ===
Events	MD4 / WD5 / XD4	MD8 / WD10 / XD7-10	MD14 / WD14 / XD14	MD18 / WD20 / XD17-20	MD22 / WD22 / XD22
Men's	7	16	9	14	6
Women's	4	9	7	11	6
Mixed	7	15	11	21	10

== Nations ==
148 men + 93 women = 241 Total

1. Bangladesh (1)
2. Cambodia (1)
3. China (38)
4. Hong Kong (17)
5. India (11)
6. Indonesia (15)
7. Iran (4)
8. Iraq (4)
9. Japan (19)
10. Jordan (2)
11. Kazakhstan (14)
12. Kyrgyzstan (1)
13. South Korea (23)
14. Kuwait (3)
15. Saudi Arabia (2)
16. Macau (10)
17. Malaysia (4)
18. Mongolia (2)
19. Nepal (4)
20. Pakistan (2)
21. Philippines (7)
22. Singapore (1)
23. Sri Lanka (1)
24. Syria (2)
25. Chinese Taipei (15)
26. Tajikistan (1)
27. Thailand (28)
28. Timor-Leste (5)
29. Uzbekistan (2)
30. Vietnam (5)

== Medal table ==
Rank	Nation	Gold	Silver	Bronze	Total
1	China (CHN)*	15	14	14	43
2	South Korea (KOR)	9	5	14	28
3	Thailand (THA)	5	5	11	21
4	Chinese Taipei (TPE)	3	3	4	10
5	Japan (JPN)	2	7	7	16
6	Hong Kong (HKG)	1	2	9	12
7	Iraq (IRQ)	1	0	0	1
8	Indonesia (INA)	0	0	4	4
9	India (IND)	0	0	2	2
9	Iran (IRI)	0	0	2	2
11	Macau (MAC)	0	0	1	1
11	Singapore (SGP)	0	0	1	1
Totals (12 entries)		36	36	69	141

== Results ==
1. Day 1:
2. Day 2:
3. Day 3:
4. Day 4:
5. Day 5:
6. Day 6:
7. Day 7:

== Medalists ==
=== Men ===
Event	Class	Gold	Silver	Bronze
Singles	1	Joo Young-dae; South Korea	Nam Ki-won; South Korea	Sandeep Dangi; India
Singles	2	Park Jin-cheol; South Korea	Cha Soo-yong; South Korea	Thirayu Chueawong; Thailand
Singles	2	Park Jin-cheol; South Korea	Cha Soo-yong; South Korea	Hassan Janfeshan; Iran
Singles	3	Feng Panfeng; China	Yuttajak Glinbancheun; Thailand	Jang Yeong-jin; South Korea
Singles	3	Feng Panfeng; China	Yuttajak Glinbancheun; Thailand	Zhai Xiang; China
Singles	4	Wanchai Chaiwut; Thailand	Kim Young-gun; South Korea	Kim Jung-gil; South Korea
Singles	4	Wanchai Chaiwut; Thailand	Kim Young-gun; South Korea	Kazuki Shichino; Japan
Singles	5	Liu Fu; China	Zhan Dashun; China	Cheng Ming-chih; Chinese Taipei
Singles	5	Liu Fu; China	Zhan Dashun; China	Cao Ningning; China
Singles	6	Rungroj Thainiyom; Thailand	Huang Jiaxin; China	Takuro Chihara; Japan
Singles	6	Rungroj Thainiyom; Thailand	Huang Jiaxin; China	Rahmad Hidayat; Indonesia
Singles	7	Katsuyoshi Yagi; Japan	Liao Keli; China	Yan Shuo; China
Singles	7	Katsuyoshi Yagi; Japan	Liao Keli; China	Chalermpong Punpoo; Thailand
Singles	8	Zhao Shuai; China	Peng Weinan; China	Sun Churen; China
Singles	8	Zhao Shuai; China	Peng Weinan; China	Phisit Wangphonphathanasiri; Thailand
Singles	9	Zhao Yiqing; China	Koyo Iwabuchi; Japan	Liu Chaodong; China
Singles	9	Zhao Yiqing; China	Koyo Iwabuchi; Japan	Wong Chi Yin; Hong Kong
Singles	10	Lian Hao; China	Mahiro Funayama; Japan	Lin Chun-ting; Chinese Taipei
Singles	10	Lian Hao; China	Mahiro Funayama; Japan	Su Jin-sian; Chinese Taipei
Singles	11	Chen Po-yen; Chinese Taipei	Takeshi Takemori; Japan	Kim Chang-gi; South Korea
Singles	11	Chen Po-yen; Chinese Taipei	Takeshi Takemori; Japan	Kim Gi-tae; South Korea
Doubles	4	South Korea; Joo Young-dae; Jang Yeong-jin	Thailand; Natthawut Thinathet; Thirayu Chueawong	South Korea; Cha Soo-yong; Park Jin-cheol
Doubles	4	South Korea; Joo Young-dae; Jang Yeong-jin	Thailand; Natthawut Thinathet; Thirayu Chueawong	Iran; Hassan Janfeshan; Mahdi Rezapour
Doubles	8	Thailand; Wanchai Chaiwut; Yuttajak Glinbancheun	China; Cao Ningning; Feng Panfeng	Indonesia; Yayang Gunaya; Adyos Astan
Doubles	8	Thailand; Wanchai Chaiwut; Yuttajak Glinbancheun	China; Cao Ningning; Feng Panfeng	Japan; Kazuki Shichino; Genki Saito
Doubles	14	Thailand; Rungroj Thainiyom; Phisit Wangphonphathanasiri	China; Liao Keli; Yan Shuo	China; Peng Weinan; Huang Jiaxin
Doubles	14	Thailand; Rungroj Thainiyom; Phisit Wangphonphathanasiri	China; Liao Keli; Yan Shuo	Hong Kong; Choy Hing Lam; Tong Chi Ming
Doubles	18	China; Zhao Shuai; Lian Hao	Japan; Koyo Iwabuchi; Hayuma Abe	Thailand; Bunpot Sillapakong; Chalermpong Punpoo
Doubles	18	China; Zhao Shuai; Lian Hao	Japan; Koyo Iwabuchi; Hayuma Abe	Hong Kong; Wong Chi Yin; Ho Ka Sing
Doubles	22	South Korea; Kim Chang-gi; Kim Gi-tae	Japan; Takeshi Takemori; Koya Kato	Hong Kong; Fan Ka Ho; Wan Wai Lok
Doubles	22	South Korea; Kim Chang-gi; Kim Gi-tae	Japan; Takeshi Takemori; Koya Kato	Hong Kong; Leung Chung Yan; Tsoi Ming Fai

=== Women ===
Event	Class	Gold	Silver	Bronze
Singles	1–2	Seo Su-yeon; South Korea	Liu Jing; China	Chilchitraryak Bootwansirina; Thailand
Singles	1–2	Seo Su-yeon; South Korea	Liu Jing; China	Claire Toh; Singapore
Singles	3	Yoon Ji-yu; South Korea	Xue Juan; China	Lee Mi-gyu; South Korea
Singles	3	Yoon Ji-yu; South Korea	Xue Juan; China	Dararat Asayut; Thailand
Singles	4	Gu Xiaodan; China	Zhou Ying; China	Wijittra Jaion; Thailand
Singles	4	Gu Xiaodan; China	Zhou Ying; China	Bhavina Patel; India
Singles	5	Pan Jiamin; China	Zhang Bian; China	Moon Sung-hye; South Korea
Singles	5	Pan Jiamin; China	Zhang Bian; China	Kang Oe-jeong; South Korea
Singles	6	Najlah Al-Dayyeni; Iraq	Lee Kun-woo; South Korea	Pang Wing Ka; Hong Kong
Singles	6	Najlah Al-Dayyeni; Iraq	Lee Kun-woo; South Korea	Jin Yucheng; China
Singles	7	Wang Rui; China	Chiu Kan Shan; Hong Kong	U Choi Hong; Macau
Singles	7	Wang Rui; China	Chiu Kan Shan; Hong Kong	Kim Seong-ok; South Korea
Singles	8	Huang Wenjuan; China	Yuri Tomono; Japan	Kanlaya Chaiwut-Kriabklang; Thailand
Singles	8	Huang Wenjuan; China	Yuri Tomono; Japan	Hamida; Indonesia
Singles	9	Mao Jingdian; China	Kim Kun-hea; South Korea	Xiong Guiyan; China
Singles	9	Mao Jingdian; China	Kim Kun-hea; South Korea	Liu Meng; China
Singles	10	Lin Tzu-yu; Chinese Taipei	Tien Shiau-wen; Chinese Taipei	Nozomi Nakamura; Japan
Singles	10	Lin Tzu-yu; Chinese Taipei	Tien Shiau-wen; Chinese Taipei	Hou Chunxiao; China
Singles	11	Natsuki Wada; Japan	Wong Ting Ting; Hong Kong	Ng Mui Wui; Hong Kong
Singles	11	Natsuki Wada; Japan	Wong Ting Ting; Hong Kong	Kanami Furukawa; Japan
Doubles	5	South Korea; Lee Mi-gyu; Seo Su-yeon	China; Xue Juan; Liu Jing	not awarded
Doubles	10	China; Zhou Ying; Zhang Bian	China; Gu Xiaodan; Pan Jiamin	South Korea; Yoon Ji-yu; Kang Oe-jeong
Doubles	10	China; Zhou Ying; Zhang Bian	China; Gu Xiaodan; Pan Jiamin	Thailand; Wassana Sringam; Wijittra Jaion
Doubles	14	China; Huang Wenjuan; Jin Yucheng	Thailand; Kanlaya Chaiwut-Kriabklang; Kanokporn Phathumcai	Hong Kong; Wong Yue Ching; Chiu Kan Shan
Doubles	14	China; Huang Wenjuan; Jin Yucheng	Thailand; Kanlaya Chaiwut-Kriabklang; Kanokporn Phathumcai	South Korea; Lee Kun-woo; Kim Seong-ok
Doubles	20	China; Xiong Guiyan; Zhao Xiaojing	Chinese Taipei; Tien Shiau-wen; Lin Tzu-yu	China; Liu Meili; Liu Meng
Doubles	20	China; Xiong Guiyan; Zhao Xiaojing	Chinese Taipei; Tien Shiau-wen; Lin Tzu-yu	Japan; Yuri Tomono; Nozomi Nakamura
Doubles	22	Hong Kong; Ng Mui Wui; Wong Ting Ting	Japan; Kanami Furukawa; Maki Ito	Hong Kong; Wong Ka Man; Wong Pui Kei
Doubles	22	Hong Kong; Ng Mui Wui; Wong Ting Ting	Japan; Kanami Furukawa; Maki Ito	Chinese Taipei; Li Jing-shiuan; Lydia Li Yi-ya

=== Mixed ===
Event	Class	Gold	Silver	Bronze
Doubles	4	South Korea; Park Jin-cheol; Seo Su-yeon	Thailand; Thirayu Chueawong; Chilchitraryak Bootwansirina	China; Zhai Xiang; Mao Lin
Doubles	4	South Korea; Park Jin-cheol; Seo Su-yeon	Thailand; Thirayu Chueawong; Chilchitraryak Bootwansirina	China; Liu Jing; Gao Yanming
Doubles	7–10	China; Feng Panfeng; Zhou Ying	Thailand; Wijittra Jaion; Wanchai Chaiwut	South Korea; Yoon Ji-yu; Kim Jung-gil
Doubles	7–10	China; Feng Panfeng; Zhou Ying	Thailand; Wijittra Jaion; Wanchai Chaiwut	South Korea; Kang Oe-jeong; Kim Young-gun
Doubles	14	Thailand; Rungroj Thainiyom; Kanlaya Chaiwut-Kriabklang	China; Wang Rui; Yan Shuo	China; Huang Wenjuan; Chen Chao
Doubles	14	Thailand; Rungroj Thainiyom; Kanlaya Chaiwut-Kriabklang	China; Wang Rui; Yan Shuo	Thailand; Kanokporn Phathumcai; Phisit Wangphonphathanasiri
Doubles	17–20	Chinese Taipei; Lin Chun-ting; Lin Tzu-yu	China; Lian Hao; Xiong Guiyan	Indonesia; Hana Resti; Mohamad Rian Prahasta
Doubles	17–20	Chinese Taipei; Lin Chun-ting; Lin Tzu-yu	China; Lian Hao; Xiong Guiyan	South Korea; Kim Kun-hea; Shin Seung-weon
Doubles	22	South Korea; Seo Yang-hee; Kim Gi-tae	Chinese Taipei; Li Jing-shiuan; Chen Po-yen	Japan; Takashi Asano; Kanami Furukawa
Doubles	22	South Korea; Seo Yang-hee; Kim Gi-tae	Chinese Taipei; Li Jing-shiuan; Chen Po-yen	Thailand; Narawit Techo; Phimolphan Deekam

== See also ==
- Table tennis at the 2023 ASEAN Para Games
- Table tennis at the 2022 Asian Games
