= Chess at the 2022 Asian Para Games =

- Location: Hangzhou, China
- Dates: 23–28 October 2023
- Competitors: 125 in 24 events

Chess at the 2022 Asian Para Games was held in China between 23 and 28 October 2023.

== Events ==
=== Women ===
1. Women's Individual Standard VI – B1 - 12 Athletes
2. Women's Individual Standard VI – B2/B3 - 23 Athletes
3. Women's Individual Standard PI - 18 Athletes
4. Women's Team Standard VI – B1 - 4 Team
5. Women's Team Standard VI – B2/B3 - 5 Team
6. Women's Team Standard PI - 5 Team
7. Women's Individual Rapid VI – B1 - 13 Athletes
8. Women's Individual Rapid VI – B2/B3 - 23 Athletes
9. Women's Individual Rapid PI - 18 Athletes
10. Women's Team Rapid VI – B1 - 4 Team
11. Women's Team Rapid VI – B2/B3 - 5 Team
12. Women's Team Rapid PI - 5 Team

=== Men ===
1. Men's Individual Standard VI – B1 - 23 Athletes
2. Men's Individual Standard VI – B2/B3 - 22 Athletes
3. Men's Individual Standard PI - 26 Athletes
4. Men's Team Standard VI – B1 - 6 Team
5. Men's Team Standard VI – B2/B3 - 7 Team
6. Men's Team Standard PI – 8 Team
7. Men's Individual Rapid VI – B1 - 23 Athletes
8. Men's Individual Rapid VI – B2/B3 - 22 Athletes
9. Men's Individual Rapid PI - 26 Athletes
10. Men's Team Rapid VI – B1 - 6 Team
11. Men's Team Rapid VI – B2/B3 - 7 Team
12. Men's Team Rapid PI - 8 Team

== Nations ==
1. Bangladesh (1)
2. China (15)
3. India (18)
4. Indonesia (18)
5. Iran (16)
6. Kazakhstan (4)
7. South Korea (1)
8. Kyrgyzstan (6)
9. Mongolia (7)
10. Philippines (13)
11. Turkmenistan (1)
12. Tajikistan (2)
13. Thailand (7)
14. Uzbekistan (4)
15. Vietnam (12)

== Entries ==
Source:

== Medal table ==
Rank	Nation	Gold	Silver	Bronze	Total
1	Indonesia (INA)	10	7	8	25
2	Philippines (PHI)	8	3	2	13
3	Iran (IRI)	4	7	4	15
4	India (IND)	2	1	5	8
5	Vietnam (VIE)	0	6	4	10
6	Kazakhstan (KAZ)	0	0	1	1
Totals (6 entries)		24	24	24	72

== Medalists ==
=== Men ===
Event	Class	Gold	Silver	Bronze
Individual standard	PI	Tirto; Indonesia	Henry Roger Lopez; Philippines	Sander Severino; Philippines
Team standard	PI	Indonesia; Alfrets Dien; Maksum Firdaus; Tirto	Philippines; Jasper Rom; Sander Severino; Henry Roger Lopez	Kazakhstan; Alimzhan Ayapov; Serik Soltanov
Individual rapid	PI	Henry Roger Lopez; Philippines	Abolfazl Kazemian Aski; Iran	Tirto; Indonesia
Team rapid	PI	Philippines; Jasper Rom; Sander Severino; Henry Roger Lopez	Iran; Abolfazl Kazemian Aski; Omid Zakeri; Amir Kachian	Indonesia; Alfrets Dien; Maksum Firdaus; Tirto
Individual standard	B1	Indra Yoga; Indonesia	Lê Văn Việt; Vietnam	Alireza Ghoorchibeygi; Iran
Team standard	B1	Indonesia; Prasetyo Fitriyanto; Yadi Sopian; Indra Yoga	Vietnam; Đinh Tuấn Sơn; Đào Tuấn Kiệt; Lê Văn Việt	Iran; Alireza Ghoorchibeygi; Hadi Moshirabadi; Mohammadreza Alizadeh
Individual rapid	B1	Darpan Satish Inani; India	Soundarya Kumar Pradhan; India	Ashvin Makwana; India
Team rapid	B1	India; Ashvin Makwana; Darpan Satish Inani; Soundarya Kumar Pradhan	Iran; Alireza Ghoorchibeygi; Hadi Moshirabadi; Mohammadreza Alizadeh	Indonesia; Prasetyo Fitriyanto; Yadi Sopian; Indra Yoga
Individual standard	B2/3	Menandro Redor; Philippines	Amir Rabbi Khorasgani; Iran	Gayuh Satrio; Indonesia
Team standard	B2/3	Philippines; Darry Bernardo; Arman Subaste; Menandro Redor	Iran; Majid Bagheri; Amir Rabbi Khorasgani; Mosleh Hamzeh Rashtabadi	Indonesia; Gayuh Satrio; Jumadi; Adji Hartono
Individual rapid	B2/3	Darry Bernardo; Philippines	Gayuh Satrio; Indonesia	Kishan Gangolli; India
Team rapid	B2/3	Philippines; Darry Bernardo; Arman Subaste; Menandro Redor	Indonesia; Gayuh Satrio; Jumadi; Adji Hartono	India; Aryan Bhalchandra Joshi; Kishan Gangolli; Somendra

=== Women ===
Event	Class	Gold	Silver	Bronze
Individual standard	PI	Cheyzer Mendoza; Philippines	Yuni; Indonesia	Đoàn Thu Huyền; Vietnam
Team standard	PI	Indonesia; Lilis Herna Yulia; Nasip Farta Simanja; Yuni	Vietnam; Đoàn Thu Huyền; Nguyễn Thị Kiều; Trần Thị Bích Thủy	Philippines; Jean-Lee Nacita; Cheyzer Mendoza; Cheryl Angot
Individual rapid	PI	Cheyzer Mendoza; Philippines	Lilis Herna Yulia; Indonesia	Nasip Farta Simanja; Indonesia
Team rapid	PI	Indonesia; Lilis Herna Yulia; Nasip Farta Simanja; Yuni	Philippines; Jean-Lee Nacita; Cheyzer Mendoza; Cheryl Angot	Vietnam; Đoàn Thu Huyền; Nguyễn Thị Kiều; Trần Thị Bích Thủy
Individual standard	B1	Maliheh Safaei; Iran	Phạm Thị Hương; Vietnam	Rathi Himanshi; India
Team standard	B1	Iran; Leila Zarezadehshahrak; Maliheh Safaei; Samira Aghaeichaghoush	Vietnam; Đào Thị Lê Xuân; Tran Ngoc Loan; Phạm Thị Hương	Indonesia; Wilma Margaretha Sinaga; Yustina Halawa; Tita Puspita
Individual rapid	B1	Maliheh Safaei; Iran	Tita Puspita; Indonesia	Leila Zarezadehshahrak; Iran
Team rapid	B1	Iran; Leila Zarezadehshahrak; Maliheh Safaei; Samira Aghaeichaghoush	Indonesia; Wilma Margaretha Sinaga; Yustina Halawa; Tita Puspita	India; Rathi Himanshi; Sanskruti More; Vruthi Saganlal Jain
Individual standard	B2/3	Aisah Wijayanti Putri Brahmana; Indonesia	Khairunnisa; Indonesia	Farah Yumna Budiarti; Indonesia
Team standard	B2/3	Indonesia; Aisah Wijayanti Putri Brahmana; Khairunnisa; Farah Yumna Budiarti	Iran; Atefeh Naghavi Mandi; Maryam Rahimzadeh; Fatemeh Rahimimehneh	Vietnam; Nguyễn Thị Mỹ Linh; Nguyễn Thị Minh Thư; Nguyễn Thị Hồng Châu
Individual rapid	B2/3	Khairunnisa; Indonesia	Nguyễn Thị Hồng Châu; Vietnam	Atefeh Naghavi Mandi; Iran
Team rapid	B2/3	Indonesia; Aisah Wijayanti Putri Brahmana; Khairunnisa; Farah Yumna Budiarti	Iran; Atefeh Naghavi Mandi; Maryam Rahimzadeh; Fatemeh Rahimimehneh	Vietnam; Nguyễn Thị Mỹ Linh; Nguyễn Thị Minh Thư; Nguyễn Thị Hồng Châu

== Ranking ==
Source:

== Start List ==
1. https://resultsapg.hangzhou2022.com.cn/APG2022/data/CHS/CHSWINDIVIDR01011-----------------_DT_PDF_C32C.pdf?random=0.4943752015538344
2. https://resultsapg.hangzhou2022.com.cn/APG2022/data/CHS/CHSMTEAM---R04011-----------------_DT_PDF_C32C.pdf?random=0.9294975350553303
3. https://resultsapg.hangzhou2022.com.cn/APG2022/data/CHS/CHSMTEAM---R03021-----------------_DT_PDF_C32C.pdf?random=0.15494607982069342
4. https://resultsapg.hangzhou2022.com.cn/APG2022/data/CHS/CHSMTEAM---R01011-----------------_DT_PDF_C32C.pdf?random=0.19016687260522147
5. https://resultsapg.hangzhou2022.com.cn/APG2022/data/CHS/CHSMINDIVIDR04011-----------------_DT_PDF_C32C.pdf?random=0.3574145898033143
6. https://resultsapg.hangzhou2022.com.cn/APG2022/data/CHS/CHSMINDIVIDR03021-----------------_DT_PDF_C32C.pdf?random=0.5747969272183147
7. https://resultsapg.hangzhou2022.com.cn/APG2022/data/CHS/CHSMINDIVIDR01011-----------------_DT_PDF_C32C.pdf?random=0.6138554017793022
8. https://resultsapg.hangzhou2022.com.cn/APG2022/data/CHS/CHSWTEAM---R04011-----------------_DT_PDF_C32C.pdf?random=0.14415984111597913
9. https://resultsapg.hangzhou2022.com.cn/APG2022/data/CHS/CHSWTEAM---R03021-----------------_DT_PDF_C32C.pdf?random=0.3818356426357067
10. https://resultsapg.hangzhou2022.com.cn/APG2022/data/CHS/CHSWTEAM---R01011-----------------_DT_PDF_C32C.pdf?random=0.5905867277460007
11. https://resultsapg.hangzhou2022.com.cn/APG2022/data/CHS/CHSWINDIVIDR04011-----------------_DT_PDF_C32C.pdf?random=0.7946386482635428
12. https://resultsapg.hangzhou2022.com.cn/APG2022/data/CHS/CHSWINDIVIDR03021-----------------_DT_PDF_C32C.pdf?random=0.6302163615295266
13. https://resultsapg.hangzhou2022.com.cn/APG2022/data/CHS/CHSMINDIVIDR01011-----------------_DT_PDF_C32C.pdf?random=0.6138554017793022
14. https://resultsapg.hangzhou2022.com.cn/APG2022/data/CHS/CHSWTEAM---R04011-----------------_DT_PDF_C32C.pdf?random=0.14415984111597913
15. https://resultsapg.hangzhou2022.com.cn/APG2022/data/CHS/CHSWTEAM---R03021-----------------_DT_PDF_C32C.pdf?random=0.3818356426357067
16. https://resultsapg.hangzhou2022.com.cn/APG2022/data/CHS/CHSWTEAM---R01011-----------------_DT_PDF_C32C.pdf?random=0.5905867277460007
17. https://resultsapg.hangzhou2022.com.cn/APG2022/data/CHS/CHSWINDIVIDR04011-----------------_DT_PDF_C32C.pdf?random=0.7946386482635428
18. https://resultsapg.hangzhou2022.com.cn/APG2022/data/CHS/CHSWINDIVIDR03021-----------------_DT_PDF_C32C.pdf?random=0.03686234004866307
19. https://resultsapg.hangzhou2022.com.cn/APG2022/data/CHS/CHSMINDIVIDS01010-----------------_DT_PDF_C32C.pdf?random=0.39805309150104384
20. https://resultsapg.hangzhou2022.com.cn/APG2022/data/CHS/CHSMINDIVIDS03020-----------------_DT_PDF_C32C.pdf?random=0.9118352741577589
21. https://resultsapg.hangzhou2022.com.cn/APG2022/data/CHS/CHSMINDIVIDS04010-----------------_DT_PDF_C32C.pdf?random=0.7247809083763487
22. https://resultsapg.hangzhou2022.com.cn/APG2022/data/CHS/CHSWINDIVIDS01010-----------------_DT_PDF_C32C.pdf?random=0.5155912398162361
23. https://resultsapg.hangzhou2022.com.cn/APG2022/data/CHS/CHSWINDIVIDS03020-----------------_DT_PDF_C32C.pdf?random=0.36471538388848823
24. https://resultsapg.hangzhou2022.com.cn/APG2022/data/CHS/CHSWINDIVIDS04010-----------------_DT_PDF_C32C.pdf?random=0.9601955577453505

== See also ==
- Chess at the 2023 ASEAN Para Games
