= Boccia at the 2022 Asian Para Games =

- Location: Hangzhou, China
- Dates: 21–27 October

Boccia at the 2022 Asian Para Games in China was held between 21 and 27 October 2023.

== Nations ==
1. China (7)
2. Hong Kong (10)
3. India (4)
4. Indonesia (5)
5. Iran (4)
6. Iraq (1)
7. Japan (9)
8. Kazakhstan (4)
9. South Korea (10)
10. Macau (1)
11. Malaysia (4)
12. Mongolia (2)
13. Philippines (4)
14. Singapore (4)
15. Chinese Taipei (8)
16. Thailand (10)

== Entries ==
=== Singles ===
Events	M/W 1	M/W 2	M/W 3	M/W 4
Men's	10	15	10	11
Women's	11	9	11	10

=== Pair and Team ===
Mixed Team - BC1/BC2 - 8 Team (3 athletes per team)

Mixed Pairs - BC3 - 9 Team

Mixed Pairs - BC4 - 8 Team

== Medal table ==
* Host nation (China)

Rank	NPC	Gold	Silver	Bronze	Total
1	China (CHN)*	3	2	0	5
2	Thailand (THA)	3	0	5	8
3	South Korea (KOR)	2	4	1	7
4	Hong Kong (HKG)	1	2	3	6
5	Malaysia (MAS)	1	2	0	3
6	Indonesia (INA)	1	1	1	3
7	Japan (JPN)	0	0	1	1
Totals (7 entries)		11	11	11	33

== Medalists ==
Event	Class	Gold	Silver	Bronze
Men's individual	BC1	Witsanu Huadpradit; Thailand	Kim Do-hyun; South Korea	Muhamad Afrizal Syafa; Indonesia
Men's individual	BC2	Felix Ardi Yudha; Indonesia	Lee Chee Hoong; Malaysia	Lee Chung-ho; South Korea
Men's individual	BC3	Akkadej Choochuenklin; Thailand	Jeong Ho-won; South Korea	Masayuki Arita; Japan
Men's individual	BC4	Pornchok Larpyen; Thailand	Zheng Yuansen; China	Leung Yuk Wing; Hong Kong
Women's individual	BC1	Zhang Qi; China	Angeline Melissa Lawas; Malaysia	Satanan Phromsiri; Thailand
Women's individual	BC2	Yeung Hiu Lam; Hong Kong	Jeong So-yeong; South Korea	Karen Kwok Hoi Ying; Hong Kong
Women's individual	BC3	Yang Beibei; China	Choi Ye-jin; South Korea	Ladamanee Kla-han; Thailand
Women's individual	BC4	Noor Askuzaimey Mat Salim; Malaysia	Lin Ximei; China	Cheung Yuen; Hong Kong
Mixed pairs	BC3	South Korea; Jeong Ho-won; Kang Sun-hee	Hong Kong; Tse Tak Wah; Ho Yuen Kei	Thailand; Ladamanee Kla-han; Akkadej Choochuenklin
Mixed pairs	BC4	China; Lin Ximei; Zheng Yuansen	Hong Kong; Leung Yuk Wing; Cheung Yuen	Thailand; Nuanchan Phonsila; Pornchok Larpyen
Mixed team	BC1/BC2	South Korea; Jeong So-yeong; Kim Do-hyun; Seo Min-kyu	Indonesia; Handayani; Felix Ardi Yudha; M. Bintang Satria Herlangga	Thailand; Watcharaphon Vongsa; Worawut Saengampa; Satanan Phromsiri
