= Indonesia at the 2022 Asian Para Games =

- IPC code: INA
- NPC: National Paralympic Committee of Indonesia

in Hangzhou 22–28 October 2023
- Competitors: 130 in 12 sports
- Flag bearer: Riadi Saputra (opening)
- Medals Ranked 5th: Gold 29 Silver 30 Bronze 37 Total 96

Asian Para Games appearances (overview)
- 2010; 2014; 2018; 2022; 2026

Youth appearances
- 2009; 2013; 2017; 2021

Indonesia participated in the 2022 Asian Para Games, the fourth edition of Asian Para Games in Hangzhou, China from 22 to 28 October 2023. The Indonesian contingent for the games consisted of 130 athletes in 12 sports. Indonesia aimed to win at least 19 gold medals or to finish in tenth position.

== Competitors ==
Sport	Total
Archery	5
Athletics	22
Badminton	18
Boccia	5
Chess	18
Cycling	7
Judo	6
Lawn bowls	12
Powerlifting	9
Shooting	4
Swimming	9
Table tennis	15
Total	130

== Medal summary ==
=== Medal by sport ===
Medals by sport
Sport	1st place, gold medalist(s)	2nd place, silver medalist(s)	3rd place, bronze medalist(s)	Total
Chess	10	7	8	25
Athletics	5	7	4	16
Badminton	5	5	4	14
Cycling	3	4	4	11
Swimming	3	1	1	5
Lawn bowls	1	3	5	9
Boccia	1	1	1	3
Judo	1	0	2	3
Powerlifting	0	2	1	3
Table tennis	0	0	4	4
Archery	0	0	2	2
Total	29	30	36	95

=== Medal by Date ===
Medals by date
Day	Date	1st place, gold medalist(s)	2nd place, silver medalist(s)	3rd place, bronze medalist(s)	Total
1	23 October	2	2	5	9
2	24 October	1	3	3	7
3	25 October	4	5	8	17
4	26 October	12	7	10	29
5	27 October	7	4	6	17
6	28 October	3	9	4	16
Total		29	30	36	95

== Medalists ==
The following Indonesian competitors won medals at the Games.

Medal	Name	Sport	Event	Date
Gold	Saptoyogo Purnomo	Athletics	Men's 400 m T37	23 October
Gold	Maulana Rifky Yavianda	Swimming	Men's 100 m Backstroke S12	23 October
Gold	Ni Made Arianti Putri; Bayu Aji Laksono (Guide)	Athletics	Women's 100 m T12	24 October
Gold	Saptoyogo Purnomo	Athletics	Men's 200 m T37	25 October
Gold	Roma Siska Tampubolon	Judo	Women's +70 kg J1	25 October
Gold	Kacung; Muhammad Anglas Bayu Rendra (Director)	Lawn bowls	Men's Singles B2	25 October
Gold	Felix Ardi Yudha	Boccia	Men's Individual BC2	25 October
Gold	Sri Sugiyanti	Cycling	Women's B Time Trial	26 October
Gold	Saptoyogo Purnomo	Athletics	Men's 100 m T37	26 October
Gold	Muhammad Fadli Imammudin	Cycling	Men's C4-5 Time Trial	26 October
Gold	Yoga Indra	Chess	Men's Individual Standard VI-B1	26 October
Gold	Tirto	Chess	Men's Individual Standard PI	26 October
Gold	Yuni; Nasip Farta Simanja; Lilis Herna Yulia	Chess	Women's Team Standard PI	26 October
Gold	Wijayanti Putri Brahmana Aisah	Chess	Women's Individual Standard VI-B2/3	26 October
Gold	Sopian Yadi; Prasetyo Fitriyanto; Yoga Indra	Chess	Men's Team Standard VI-B1	26 October
Gold	Wijayanti Putri Brahmana Aisah; Khairunnisa; Yumna Budiarti Farah	Chess	Women's Team Standard VI-B2/3	26 October
Gold	Tirto; Dien Alfrets; Firdaus Maksum	Chess	Men's Team Standard PI	26 October
Gold	Subhan; Rina Marlina	Badminton	Mixed's Doubles SH6	26 October
Gold	Hikmat Ramdani; Leani Ratri Oktila	Badminton	Mixed's Doubles SL3-SU5	26 October
Gold	Sri Sugiyanti	Cycling	Women's Road Race B	27 October
Gold	Dheva Anrimusthi	Badminton	Men's Singles SU5	27 October
Gold	Hafizh Briliansyah; Dheva Anrimusthi	Badminton	Men's Doubles SU5	27 October
Gold	Khalimatus Sadiyah; Leani Ratri Oktila	Badminton	Women's Doubles SL3-SU5	27 October
Gold	Partin	Athletics	Men's 100 m T63	27 October
Gold	Jendy Pangabean	Swimming	Men's 100 m Backstroke S9	27 October
Gold	Maulana Rifky Yavianda	Swimming	Men's 100 m Freestyle S12	27 October
Gold	Yuni; Nasip Farta Simanja; Lilis Herna Yulia	Chess	Women's Team Rapid PI	28 October
Gold	Wijayanti Putri Brahmana Aisah; Khairunnisa; Yumna Budiarti Farah	Chess	Women's Team Rapid VI-B2/3	28 October
Gold	Khairunnisa	Chess	Women's Individual Standard VI-B2/3	28 October
Silver	Suparni Yati	Athletics	Women's Shot Put F20	23 October
Silver	Sri Sugiyanti; Nimal Magfiroh (Pilot)	Cycling	Women's B 3000 m Individual Pursuit	23 October
Silver	Eko Saputra	Athletics	Men's 100 m T12	24 October
Silver	Ni Nengah Widiasih	Powerlifting	Women's -45 kg	24 October
Silver	Maulana Rifky Yavianda	Swimming	Men's 100 m Butterfly S12	24 October
Silver	Muhammad Fadli Imammuddin	Cycling	Men's C4-5 4000 m Individual Pursuit	25 October
Silver	Nimatul Fauziyah; Tatiana Prihandayani (Director)	Lawn bowls	Women's Singles B1	25 October
Silver	Dwi Widiantoro; Muhammad Anglas Bayu Rendra (Director)	Lawn bowls	Men's Singles B1	25 October
Silver	Alfin Nomleni	Athletics	Men's 400 m T20	25 October
Silver	Titin	Lawn bowls	Women's Singles B8	25 October
Silver	Nurfendi	Cycling	Men's B Time Trial	26 October
Silver	Yuni	Chess	Women's Individual Standard PI	26 October
Silver	Khairunnisa	Chess	Women's Individual Standard VI-B2/3	26 October
Silver	Karisma Evi Tiarani	Athletics	Women's 100 m T63/64	26 October
Silver	Leani Ratri Oktila	Badminton	Women's Singles SL4	26 October
Silver	Qonitah Ikhtiar Syakuroh	Badminton	Women's Singles SL3	26 October
Silver	Fredy Setiawan; Khalimatus Sadiyah	Badminton	Mixed's Doubles SL3-SU5	26 October
Silver	Nurfendi	Cycling	Men's Road Race B	27 October
Silver	Rina Marlina	Badminton	Women's Singles SH6	27 October
Silver	Fredy Setiawan; Dwiyoko	Badminton	Men's Doubles SL3-SL4	27 October
Silver	Muhammad Bintang Satria Herlangga; Felix Ardi Yudha; Handayani	Boccia	Mixed Team - BC1/BC2	27 October
Silver	Nur Ferry Pradana	Athletics	Men's 400 m T47	28 October
Silver	Partin	Athletics	Men's Long Jump T63	28 October
Silver	Ni Made Arianti Putri; Nanda Mei Sholihah; Saptoyogo Purnomo; Jaenal Aripin	Athletics	4x100m Universal Relay	28 October
Silver	Satrio Gayuh; Jumadi; Hartono Adji	Chess	Men's Team Rapid VI-B2/3	28 October
Silver	Satrio Gayuh	Chess	Men's Individual Rapid VI-B2/3	28 October
Silver	Yustina Halawa; Wilma Margaretha Sinaga; Tita Puspita	Chess	Women's Team Rapid PI	28 October
Silver	Tita Puspita	Chess	Women's Individual Rapid PI	28 October
Silver	Lilis Herna Yulia	Chess	Women's Individual Rapid PI	28 October
Silver	Sriyanti	Powerlifting	Women's +86 kg	28 October
Bronze	Nurfendi; Diwan Fiar Pradana (Pilot)	Cycling	Men's B 4000 m Individual Pursuit	23 October
Bronze	Muhammad Fadli Imammuddin Habib Shaleh Sufyan Saori	Cycling	Mixed C1-5 750 m Team Sprint	23 October
Bronze	Novia Larassati	Judo	Women -48 kg J1	23 October
Bronze	Junaedi	Judo	Men -60 kg J1	23 October
Bronze	Fauzi Purwolaksono	Athletics	Men's Javelin Throw F57	23 October
Bronze	Taufik Abdul Karim; Ryan Erry Atmaji (Director)	Lawn bowls	Men's Singles B3	24 October
Bronze	Elsa Nur Fitriana; Sutrisna (Director)	Lawn bowls	Women's Singles B3	24 October
Bronze	Hamida	Table tennis	Women's Singles - Class 8	24 October
Bronze	Jaenal Aripin	Athletics	Men's 100 m T54	25 October
Bronze	Wahyu Retno Wulandari; Mahda Aulia	Archery	Women's Doubles Recurve - Open	25 October
Bronze	Rahmad Hidayat	Table tennis	Men's Singles - Class 6	25 October
Bronze	Tifan Abid Alana	Cycling	Men's C3 3000 m Individual Pursuit	25 October
Bronze	Julia Verawati; Pomo Warih Adi (Director)	Lawn bowls	Women's Singles B2	25 October
Bronze	Khalimatus Sadiyah	Badminton	Women's Singles SL4	25 October
Bronze	Muhammad Afrizal Syafa	Boccia	Men's Individual BC1	25 October
Bronze	Syuci Indriani	Swimming	Women's 100 m Breaststroke SB14	25 October
Bronze	Rica Octavia	Athletics	Women's Long Jump T20	26 October
Bronze	Satrio Gayuh	Chess	Men's Individual Standard VI-B2/3	26 October
Bronze	Satrio Gayuh; Jumadi; Hartono Adji	Chess	Men's Team Standard VI-B2/3	26 October
Bronze	Yumna Budiarti Farah	Chess	Women's Individual Standard VI-B2/3	26 October
Bronze	Yustina Halawa; Wilma Margaretha Sinaga; Tita Puspita	Chess	Women's Team Standard PI	26 October
Bronze	Siti Mahmudah	Powerlifting	Women's 79 kg	26 October
Bronze	Freddy Setiawan	Badminton	Men's Singles SL4	26 October
Bronze	Suryo Nugroho	Badminton	Men's Singles SU5	26 October
Bronze	Dimas Tri Aji; Subhan	Badminton	Men's Doubles SH6	26 October
Bronze	Nur Ferry Pradana	Athletics	Men's 100 m T47	26 October
Bronze	Sufyan Saori	Cycling	Men's Road Race C4-5	27 October
Bronze	Ken Swagumilang	Archery	Men's Individual Compound	27 October
Bronze	Adyos Astan; Yayang Gunaya	Table tennis	Men's Doubles - Class MD8	27 October
Bronze	Hana Resti; Mohamad Rian Prahasta	Table tennis	Mixed Doubles - Class XD17-20	27 October
Bronze	Nimatul Fauziyah; Dwi Widiantoro	Lawn bowls	Mixed Pairs B1	27 October
Bronze	Kacung; Julia Verawati	Lawn bowls	Mixed Pairs B2	27 October
Bronze	Sopian Yadi; Prasetyo Fitriyanto; Yoga Indra	Chess	Men's Team Rapid VI-B1	28 October
Bronze	Tirto; Dien Alfrets; Firdaus Maksum	Chess	Men's Team Rapid PI	28 October
Bronze	Tirto	Chess	Men's Individual Rapid PI	28 October
Bronze	Nasip Farta Simanja	Chess	Women's Individual Rapid PI	28 October

== Boccia ==
=== Men ===
Team	Event	Group Stage				Quarterfinal	Semifinals	Final / BM	
Team	Event	Opposition Score	Opposition Score	Opposition Score	Rank	Opposition Score	Opposition Score	Opposition Score	Rank
Muhamad Afrizal Syafa	Individual BC1	Munkhdembrel Togootogtokh (MGL); W 6–1	Chia Sheng Liu (TPE); W 9–0	—N/a	1 Q	Mohammed Chyad (IRQ); W 11–1	Witsanu Huadpradit (THA); L 1–4	Takumi Nakamura (JPN); W 6–2	3rd place, bronze medalist(s)
Muhammad Bintang Satria Herlangga	Individual BC2	Che Yang Lin (TPE); W 5–4	Zhijian Lan (CHN); L 2–7	—N/a	2 Q	Lee Chee Hong (MAS); L 2–4	Did not advance		
Felix Ardi Yudha	Individual BC2	Irmuun KhurelBaatar (MGL); W 12–0	Lee Chee Hong (MAS); L 2–4	—N/a	1 Q	Zhijian Lan (CHN); W 6–2	Watcharaphon Vongsa (THA); W 7–3	Lee Chee Hong (MAS); W 5–3	1st place, gold medalist(s)

=== Women ===
Team	Event	Group Stage				Quarterfinal	Semifinals	Final / BM	
Team	Event	Opposition Score	Opposition Score	Opposition Score	Rank	Opposition Score	Opposition Score	Opposition Score	Rank
Handayani	Individual BC1	Satanan Phromsiri (THA); L 0–7	Mei Yee Leung (HKG); L 1–5	Daniella Catacutan (PHI); W 8–6	3	Did not advance			
Gischa Zayana	Individual BC2	Ayami Ito (JPN); W 7–5	Soyeong Jeong (KOR); L 2–4	—N/a	2	Did not advance			

=== Mixed ===
Team	Event	Group Stage				Semifinals	Final / BM	
Team	Event	Opposition Score	Opposition Score	Opposition Score	Rank	Opposition Score	Opposition Score	Rank
Muhammad Bintang Satria Herlangga; Felix Ardi Yudha; Handayani	Team BC1–2	Hong Kong (HKG); W 11–3	South Korea (KOR); W 5–3	Kazakhstan (KAZ); W 23–1	1 Q	China (CHN); W 8–3	South Korea (KOR); L 4–8	2nd place, silver medalist(s)

== Blind Judo ==
Athlete	Event	Group Stage				Round of 16	Quarter Finals	Semifinals	Repechage 1	Repechage 2	Final	
Athlete	Event	Oppositions Score	Opposition Score	Opposition Score	Opposition Score	Oppositions Score	Opposition Score	Opposition Score	Opposition Score	Opposition Score	Opposition Score	Rank
Junaedi	Men -60 kg J1	—N/a				Uulu Beksultan Abdrakhim (KGZ); W 10–0	Rustam Mambetkulov (KAZ); W 10–1	Seyed Meysam Abadi (IRN); L 0–10	—N/a		Sukhrob Shukurov (UZB); W 10–0	3rd place, bronze medalist(s)
Rafli Ahnaf Shidqi	Men -73 kg J1	—N/a				Manoj Bhatta (NEP); W 10–0	Mahdi Borchlou (IRN); W 0s1–0H	Shamey Yergali (KAZ); L 0H–1s1	—N/a		Zhiwei Zhou (CHN); L 0s2–10	Did not advance
Fajar Pambudi	Men -90 kg J1	—N/a				Devendra Yadav (IND); W 1s1–0s2	Mousa Gholamishafia (IRN); L 0s1–10	—N/a	Bye	Tserentogtokh Naranjargal (MGL); W 10–0	Bauyrzhan Arstanbekov (CHN); L 0–10s1	Did not advance
Tony Ricardo Mantolas	Men -90 kg J1	—N/a					Yerlan Konkiyev (KAZ); L 0s2–10s2	Did not advance	Bye	—N/a	Talgat Azhgaliyev (KAZ); L 0–1s2	Did not advance
Larassati Novia	Women -48 kg J1	—N/a					Bai Janki (IND); W 10–0	Khaiitkhon Khusan Kyzf (IND); L 0–10	Bye	—N/a	Suvd Erdene Togtokhbayar (MGL); W 10–0	3rd place, bronze medalist(s)
Roma Siska Tampubolon	Women -70 kg J1	Feruza Ergasheva (UZB); W 10–0	Maryam Aldhanhani (UAE); W 10–0	Yan Meng (CHN); W 10–0	Mukesh Rani (IND); W 11–1	—N/a						1st place, gold medalist(s)

== See also ==
- Indonesia at the 2022 Asian Games
