= Cycling at the 2022 Asian Para Games =

- Location: Hangzhou, China
- Dates: 23–27 October

Cycling at the 2022 Asian Para Games in Hangzhou, China was held between 23 and 27 October 2023.

== Nations ==
1. China (19)
2. Indonesia (7)
3. India (6)
4. Iran (3)
5. Japan (3)
6. Kazakhstan (2)
7. South Korea (7)
8. Laos (2)
9. Malaysia (9)
10. Philippines (3)
11. Thailand (11)
12. Tajikistan (1)
13. United Arab Emirates (5)
14. Uzbekistan (4)

== Entries ==
1. Men's C1-3 1000m Time Trial = 12
2. Men's C4-5 1000m Time Trial = 10
3. Men's B 1000m Time Trial = 7
4. Men's C1 3000m Individual Pursuit = 4
5. Men's C2 3000m Individual Pursuit = 6
6. Men's C3 3000m Individual Pursuit = 4
7. Men's C4-5 4000m Individual Pursuit = 11
8. Men's B 4000m Individual Pursuit = 8
9. Men's C1-3 Road Race = 14
10. Men's C4-5 Road Race = 18
11. Men's B Road Race = 10
12. Men's H1-5 Road Race = 10
13. Men's C1-3 Time Trial = 13
14. Men's B Time Trial = 8
15. Men's C4-5 Time Trial = 14
16. Men's H1-5 Time Trial = 10
17. Women's C1-5 Road Race = 7
18. Women's H1-5 Road Race = 7
19. Women's B Road Race = 7
20. Women's C1-3 Time Trial = 6
21. Women's H1-5 Time Trial = 7
22. Women's C4-5 Time Trial = 3
23. Women's B Time Trial = 6
24. Women's C1-3 500m Time Trial = 6
25. Women's C4-5 500m Time Trial = 2
26. Women's B 1000m Time Trial = 5
27. Women's C1-3 3000m Individual Pursuit = 6
28. Women's C4-5 3000m Individual Pursuit = 2
29. Women's B 3000m Individual Pursuit = 6
30. Mixed C1-5 750m Team Sprint = 5

== Medal table ==
Rank	NPC	Gold	Silver	Bronze	Total
1	China (CHN)	19	14	5	38
2	South Korea (KOR)	4	0	4	8
3	Indonesia (INA)	3	4	4	11
4	Japan (JPN)	3	1	5	9
5	Malaysia (MAS)	1	6	4	11
6	Thailand (THA)	0	2	0	2
7	Uzbekistan (UZB)	0	1	2	3
8	Kazakhstan (KAZ)	0	0	2	2
9	Iran (IRI)	0	0	1	1
Totals (9 entries)		30	28	27	85

== Medalists ==
=== Road cycling ===
Men

Event	Class	Gold	Silver	Bronze
Road race	B	Kim Jung-been; South Korea	Nurfendi Nurfendi; Indonesia	Kenzhegul Seitzhan; Kazakhstan
Time trial	B	Kim Jung-been; South Korea	Nurfendi Nurfendi; Indonesia	Kenzhegul Seitzhan; Kazakhstan
Road race	C1–3	Liang Weicong; China	Adi Raimie Amizazahan; Malaysia	Masaki Fujita; Japan
Time trial	C1–3	Masaki Fujita; Japan	Liang Weicong; China	Shota Kawamoto; Japan
Road race	C4–5	Wei Guoping; China	Wang Xian; China	Sufyan Saori; Indonesia
Time trial	C4–5	Fadli Immammuddin; Indonesia	Wang Xian; China	Boymurod Yavkochev; Uzbekistan
Road race	H1–5	Liu Qiangli; China	Atachai Sriwichai; Thailand	Yoon Yeo-keun; South Korea
Time trial	H1–5	Liu Qiangli; China	Atachai Sriwichai; Thailand	Yoon Yeo-keun; South Korea

Women

Event	Class	Gold	Silver	Bronze
Road race	B	Sri Sugiyanti; Indonesia	Wang Linhua; China	Nur Azlia Syafinaz Zais; Malaysia
Time trial	B	Sri Sugiyanti; Indonesia	Wang Linhua; China	Nur Azlia Syafinaz Zais; Malaysia
Road race	C1–5	Ji Zixian; China	Li Xiaohui; China	Wang Xiaomei; China
Time trial	C1–3	Qian Wangwei; China	Wang Xiaomei; China	Keiko Sugiura; Japan
Time trial	C4–5	Li Xiaohui; China	Ji Zixian; China	not awarded
Road race	H1–5	Sun Bianbian; China	Li Huaxian; China	Lee Do-yeon; South Korea
Time trial	H1–5	Lee Do-yeon; South Korea	Sun Bianbian; China	Li Huaxian; China

=== Track cycling ===
Men

Event	Class	Gold	Silver	Bronze
1000 m time trial	B	Luo Fei; China	Mohd Khairul Hazwan Wahab; Malaysia	Mohammad Dalir Heidarabadi; Iran
4000 m individual pursuit	B	Kim Jung-been; South Korea	Mohd Khairul Hazwan Wahab; Malaysia	Nurfendi Nurfendi; Indonesia
1000 m time trial	C1–3	Li Zhangyu; China	Liang Weicong; China	Shota Kawamoto; Japan
3000 m individual pursuit	C1	Li Zhangyu; China	Liang Weicong; China	Yusof Hafizi Shaharuddin; Malaysia
3000 m individual pursuit	C2	Shota Kawamoto; Japan	Golibbek Mirzoyarov; Uzbekistan	Yeom Seul-chan; South Korea
3000 m individual pursuit	C3	Masaki Fujita; Japan	Adi Raimie Amizazahan; Malaysia	Tifan Abid Alana; Indonesia
1000 m time trial	C4–5	Wu Guoqing; China	Lai Shanzhang; China	Tan Zeqiang; China
4000 m individual pursuit	C4–5	Wang Xian; China	Fadli Immammuddin; Indonesia	Azimbek Abdullaev; Uzbekistan

Women

Event	Class	Gold	Silver	Bronze
1000 m time trial	B	Nur Suraiya Zamri; Malaysia	Nur Azlia Syafinaz Zais; Malaysia	Wang Linhua; China
3000 m individual pursuit	B	Wang Linhua; China	Sri Sugiyanti; Indonesia	Nur Azlia Syafinaz Zais; Malaysia
500 m time trial	C1–3	Qian Wangwei; China	Song Zhenling; China	Keiko Sugiura; Japan
3000 m individual pursuit	C1–3	Qian Wangwei; China	Keiko Sugiura; Japan	Wang Xiaomei; China
500 m time trial	C4–5	Li Xiaohui; China	not awarded	not awarded
3000 m individual pursuit	C4–5	Ji Zixian; China	not awarded	not awarded

Mixed

Event	Class	Gold	Silver	Bronze
750 m team sprint	C1–5	China; Lai Shanzhang; Li Zhangyu; Wu Guoqing; Liang Weicong; Tan Zeqiang	Malaysia; Zuhairie Ahmad Tarmizi; Muhammad Hafiz Jamali; Yusof Hafiz Shaharuddin	Indonesia; Fadli Immammuddin; Sufyan Saori; Habib Shaleh
