= Iran at the 2022 Asian Para Games =

- IPC code: IRN
- NPC: I. R. Iran National Paralympic Committee
- Website: www.paralympic.ir (in Persian and English)

19–28 October 2023
- Competitors: 209 in 16 sports
- Flag bearers: Vahid Nouri & Sareh Javanmardi
- Medals Ranked 2nd: Gold 44 Silver 46 Bronze 41 Total 131

Asian Para Games appearances (overview)
- 2010; 2014; 2018; 2022

Youth appearances
- 2009; 2013; 2017; 2021

Iran competed in the 2022 Asian Para Games in Hangzhou, China from 19 October to 28 October 2023. Earlier the event was scheduled to held in October 2022 but due to COVID-19 pandemic cases rising in China the event was postponed and rescheduled to October 2023.

== Competitors ==
Iran participated at the Games with 209 athletes (127 men and 82 women) in 16 sports. The following is the list of sports and numbers of athletes participating at the 2022 Asian Para Games.

Sport	Men	Women	Total
Archery	7	4	11
Athletics	31	21	52
Blind Football	10	0	10
Boccia	2	2	4
Chess	9	7	16
Cycling	3	0	3
Goalball	6	6	12
Judo	8	0	8
Para Canoe	3	3	6
Powerlifting	10	4	14
Shooting	1	5	6
Sitting volleyball	12	12	24
Swimming	5	0	5
Table tennis	4	0	4
Taekwondo	4	6	10
Wheelchair basketball	12	12	24
Total	127	82	209

== Medal summary ==
=== Medals by sport ===
Medals by sport
Sport	Gold	Silver	Bronze	Total
Athletics	21	20	10	51
Archery	5	1	3	9
Chess	4	7	4	15
Swimming	3	5	6	14
Taekwondo	3	4	3	10
Powerlifting	2	4	5	11
Judo	2	1	3	6
Para Canoe	2	1	2	5
Shooting	1	1	0	2
Sitting volleyball	1	1	0	2
Blind Football	0	1	0	1
Table tennis	0	0	2	2
Cycling	0	0	1	1
Wheelchair basketball	0	0	1	1
Goalball	0	0	1	1
Total	44	46	41	131

=== Medals by day ===
Medals by day
Day	Date	Gold	Silver	Bronze	Total
1	23 Oct	8	8	6	22
2	24 Oct	8	11	6	25
3	25 Oct	8	11	7	26
4	26 Oct	8	6	9	23
5	27 Oct	7	3	9	19
6	28 Oct	5	7	4	16
Total		44	46	41	131

=== Medals by gender ===
Medals by gender
Gender	Gold	Silver	Bronze	Percantage	Total
Male	31	34	24	89	67.9%
Female	12	12	16	40	30.5%
Mixed	1	0	1	2	1.53%
Total	44	46	41	131	100%

=== Medalists ===
Medal	Name	Sport	Event	Date
Gold	Alireza Mokhtari	Athletics	Men's Discus Throw-F51/52/53	23 October
Gold	Amirhossein Alipour	Athletics	Men's Shot Put-F11	23 October
Gold	Amanolah Papi	Athletics	Men's Javelin Throw-F57	23 October
Gold	Aghdas Elnaz Darabian	Athletics	Women's Discus Throw-F51/52/53	23 October
Gold	Seyed Meysam Banitaba	Judo	Men -60 kg J1	23 October
Gold	Saeid Hosseinpoor	Para Canoe	Men's KL1	23 October
Gold	Sina Zeyghaminejad	Swimming	Men's 50m Freestyle - S10	23 October
Gold	Sina Zeyghaminejad	Swimming	Men's 100m Breaststroke - SB9	23 October
Gold	Mehrdad Moradi	Athletics	Men's 100m-T12	24 October
Gold	Ali Pirouj	Athletics	Men's Javelin Throw-F13	24 October
Gold	Elham Salehi	Athletics	Women's Shot Put-F54	24 October
Gold	Parastoo Habibi	Athletics	Women's Club Throw-F32/51	24 October
Gold	Eslam Jahedi	Para Canoe	Men's VL2	24 October
Gold	Faezeh Ahmadi	Shooting	P2 - Women's 10m Air Pistol SH1	24 October
Gold	Mahdi Pour Rahnama	Taekwondo	Men's K44 -70kg	24 October
Gold	Roza Ebrahimi	Taekwondo	Women's K44 -57kg	24 October
Gold	Mohammadreza Arab Ameri; Gholamreza Rahimi	Archery	Men's Doubles Recurve - Open	25 October
Gold	Alireza Zare	Athletics	Men's 200m-T35	25 October
Gold	Rashid Masjedi	Athletics	Men's Shot Put-F53	25 October
Gold	Seyed Aliasghar Javanmardi	Athletics	Men's Shot Put-F35	25 October
Gold	Yasin Khosravi	Athletics	Men's Shot Put-F57	25 October
Gold	Vahid Nouri	Judo	Men +90 kg J2	25 October
Gold	Sina Zeyghaminejad	Swimming	Men's 100m Freestyle - S10	25 October
Gold	Hamed Haghshenas	Taekwondo	Men's K44 +80kg	25 October
Gold	Zahra Nemati; Mohammadreza Arab Ameri	Archery	Mixed Team Recurve - Open	26 October
Gold	Alireza Zare	Athletics	Men's 100m-T35	26 October
Gold	Saeid Afrooz	Athletics	Men's Javelin Throw-F33/34	26 October
Gold	Hagar Safarzadeh	Athletics	Women's 200m-T12	26 October
Gold	Mahdi Olad	Athletics	Men's Discus Throw-F11	26 October
Gold	Hamed Amiri	Athletics	Men's Shot Put-F55	26 October
Gold	Maliheh Shafaei	Chess	Women's Individual Standard VI-B1	26 October
Gold	Leila Zarezadeh; Maliheh Shafaei; Samira Aghaei	Chess	Women's Team Standard VI-B1	26 October
Gold	Alisina Manshaezadeh	Archery	Men's Individual Compound - Open	27 October
Gold	Gholamreza Rahimi	Archery	Men's Individual Recurve - Open	27 October
Gold	Zahra Nemati	Archery	Women's Individual Recurve - Open	27 October
Gold	Erfan Bondori	Athletics	Men's Javelin Throw-F54	27 October
Gold	Saman Pakbaz	Athletics	Men's Shot Put-F12	27 October
Gold	Aliakbar Gharibshahi	Powerlifting	Men's -107 kg	27 October
Gold	Iran men's national sitting volleyball team: Ghasem Eslami; Morteza Mehrzad; Meisam Alipour; Davoud Alipourian; Meysam Hajibabaei; Jamal Nazari; Sadegh Bigdeli; Alireza Poursemnani; Hossein Golestani; Masoud Emami; Ramezan Salehi; Mahdi Babadi	Siiting volleyball	Men's Team	27 October
Gold	Mehrdad Moradi	Athletics	Men's 400m-T12	28 October
Gold	Fatemeh Amirzadegani	Athletics	Women's 400m-T12	28 October
Gold	Maliheh Shafaei	Chess	Women's Individual Rapid VI-B1	28 October
Gold	Leila Zarezadeh; Maliheh Shafaei; Samira Aghaei	Chess	Women's Team Rapid VI-B1	28 October
Gold	Ahmad Aminzadeh	Powerlifting	Men's +107 kg	28 October
Silver	Vahid Alinajimi	Athletics	Men's 100m-T13	23 October
Silver	Reza Hatami	Athletics	Men's 400m-T38	23 October
Silver	Asadollah Azimi	Athletics	Men's Discus Throw-F51/52/53	23 October
Silver	Mahdi Olad	Athletics	Men's Shot Put-F11	23 October
Silver	Hanan Kaab Omeir	Athletics	Women's Discus Throw-F51/52/53	23 October
Silver	Shahin Izadyar	Swimming	Men's 50m Freestyle - S10	23 October
Silver	Shahin Izadyar	Swimming	Men's 100m Breaststroke - SB9	23 October
Silver	Mohammadhossein Karimi	Swimming	Men's 100m Backstroke - S12	23 October
Silver	Amir Khosravani	Athletics	Men's Long Jump-T12	24 October
Silver	Sajad Nikparast	Athletics	Men's Javelin Throw-F13	24 October
Silver	Sadegh Beit Sayah	Athletics	Men's Javelin Throw-F41	24 October
Silver	Mousa Gholami	Judo	Men -90 kg J1	24 October
Silver	Shahla Behrouzirad	Para Canoe	Women's KL3	24 October
Silver	Mohsen Bakhtiar	Powerlifting	Men's -59 kg	24 October
Silver	Amir Jafari Arangeh	Powerlifting	Men's -65 kg	24 October
Silver	Sareh Javanmardi	Shooting	P2 - Women's 10m Air Pistol SH1	24 October
Silver	Sina Zeyghaminejad	Swimming	Men's 200m Individual Medley - SM10	24 October
Silver	Saeid Sadeghianpour	Taekwondo	Men's K44 -63kg	24 October
Silver	Romina Chamsouraki	Taekwondo	Women's K44 -65kg	24 October
Silver	Zahra Nemati; Somayeh Rahimi	Archery	Women's Doubles Recurve - Open	25 October
Silver	Alireza Mokhtari	Athletics	Men's Shot Put-F53	25 October
Silver	Hormoz Seidi	Athletics	Men's Javelin Throw-F37/38	25 October
Silver	Mahdi Moradikoochi	Athletics	Men's Long Jump-T13	25 October
Silver	Sajad Mohammadian	Athletics	Men's Shot Put-F63	25 October
Silver	Parastoo Habibi	Athletics	Women's Shot Put-F32	25 October
Silver	Faezeh Dibaei	Athletics	Women's Discus Throw-F56/57	25 October
Silver	Roohollah Rostami	Powerlifting	Men's -80 kg	25 October
Silver	Abolfazl Zarif	Swimming	Men's 50m Freestyle - S9	25 October
Silver	Alireza Bakhti	Taekwondo	Men's K44 -80kg	25 October
Silver	Leila Mirzaei	Taekwondo	Women's K44 +65kg	25 October
Silver	Erfan Rezaei	Athletics	Men's Javelin Throw-F33/34	26 October
Silver	Atena Mohammadi	Athletics	Women's Shot Put-F33	26 October
Silver	Zafar Zaker	Athletics	Men's Shot Put-F55	26 October
Silver	Amir Rabbi	Chess	Men's Individual Standard VI-B2/B3	26 October
Silver	Majid Bagheri; Amir Rabbi; Hamzeg Mosleh	Chess	Men's Team Standard VI-B2/B3	26 October
Silver	Fatemeh Rahimi; Maryam Rahimzadeh; Atefeh Naghavi	Chess	Women's Team Standard VI-B2/B3	26 October
Silver	Hadi Kaeidi	Athletics	Men's Shot Put-F34	27 October
Silver	Vahid Alinajimi	Athletics	Men's 400m-T13	27 October
Silver	Iran Women's national sitting volleyball team: Masoumeh Zarei; Zeynab Maleki; Farzaneh Heidari; Batoul Khalilzadeh; Mehri Fallahi; Fatemeh Abbasi; Zahra Lotfi; Tayebeh Jafari; Zahra Danayetous; Fatemeh Jahani; Hadis Rezaei; Zahra Nejati	Siiting volleyball	Women's Team	27 October
Silver	Zafar Zaker	Athletics	Men's Javelin Throw-F55	28 October
Silver	Iran men's national Blind Football team: Mohammadamin Rahimzadeh; Sadegh Rahimi; Morteza Karimi; Alireza Bakht; Alireza Izadi; Ahmadreza Shahhosseini; Kambiz Mohkam; Hossein Rajabpour; Seyed Saeed Mousavi; Morteza Ramezani	Blind Football	Men's Team	28 October
Silver	Abolfazl Kazemian	Chess	Men's Individual Rapid PI	28 October
Silver	Hadi Moshirabadi; Alireza Ghoorchibeygi; Mohammadreza Alizadeh	Chess	Men's Team Rapid VI-B1	28 October
Silver	Omid Zakeri; Abolfazl Kazemian; Amir Kachian	Chess	Men's Team Rapid PI	28 October
Silver	Atefeh Naghavi; Maryam Rahimzadeh; Fatemeh Rahimi	Chess	Women's Team Rapid VI-B2/B3	28 October
Silver	Mahdi Sayadi	Powerlifting	Men's +107 kg	28 October
Bronze	Rashid Masjedi	Athletics	Men's Discus Throw-F51/52/53	23 October
Bronze	Saeid Kouhkan	Judo	Men -60 kg J2	23 October
Bronze	Sara Abdolmaleki	Para Canoe	Women's KL1	23 October
Bronze	Maryam Abdollahpour	Taekwondo	Women's K44 -47kg	23 October
Bronze	Narges Javadi	Taekwondo	Women's K44 -52kg	23 October
Bronze	Mahdiyeh Sadat Hosseini	Taekwondo	Women's K44 -52kg	23 October
Bronze	Mohammad Dalir	Cycling	Men's B 1000m Time Trial	24 October
Bronze	Mahdi Borchlou	Judo	Men -73 kg J1	24 October
Bronze	Roya Soltani	Para Canoe	Women's KL2	24 October
Bronze	Seyed Yousef Yousefi	Powerlifting	Men's -59 kg	24 October
Bronze	Mohammadhossein Karimi	Swimming	Men's 100m Butterfly - S12	24 October
Bronze	Shahin Izadyar	Swimming	Men's 200m Individual Medley - SM10	24 October
Bronze	Maryam Yavarpoor; Farzaneh Asgari	Archery	Women's Doubles Compound - Open	25 October
Bronze	Milad Ramazani	Athletics	Men's 400m-T20	25 October
Bronze	Leila Kabgzan	Athletics	Women's Shot Put-F64	25 October
Bronze	Ali Navaei	Judo	Men +90 kg J1	25 October
Bronze	Mahdieh Mohammadian	Powerlifting	Women's -55 kg	25 October
Bronze	Shahin Izadyar	Swimming	Men's 100m Freestyle - S10	25 October
Bronze	Hassan Janfeshan	Table tennis	Men's Singles - Class 2	25 October
Bronze	Maryam Yavarpoor; Hadi Nori	Archery	Mixed Team Compound - Open	26 October
Bronze	Batoul Jahangiri	Athletics	Women's Shot Put-F33	26 October
Bronze	Fereshteh Moradi	Athletics	Women's Shot Put-F34	26 October
Bronze	Hassan Bajoulvand	Athletics	Men's Discus Throw-F11	26 October
Bronze	Elham Salehi	Athletics	Women's Javelin Throw-F54	26 October
Bronze	Alireza Ghoorchibeygi	Chess	Men's Individual Standard VI-B1	26 October
Bronze	Alireza Ghoorchibeygi; Hadi Moshirabadi; Mohammadreza Alizadeh	Chess	Men's Team Standard VI-B1	26 October
Bronze	Zahra Aghaei	Powerlifting	Women's -73 kg	26 October
Bronze	Shahin Izadyar	Swimming	Men's 100m Backstroke - S10	26 October
Bronze	Ali Shamshiri	Athletics	Men's Shot Put-F12	27 October
Bronze	Omid Zarif	Athletics	Men's 400m-T13	27 October
Bronze	Vajiheh Houshmand	Athletics	Women's Discus Throw-F64	27 October
Bronze	Iran men's national goalball team: Nematolah Sarafraz; Hassan Jafari; Mahdi Abbasi; Milad Souri; Mostafa Shahbazi; Khalil Shahriarnasab	Goalball	Men's Team	27 October
Bronze	Saman Razi	Powerlifting	Men's -107 kg	27 October
Bronze	Mohammadhossein Karimi	Swimming	Men's 100m Freestyle - S12	27 October
Bronze	Abolfazl Negarestani	Swimming	Men's 100m Backstroke - S9	27 October
Bronze	Hassan Janfeshan; Mahdi Rezapour	Table tennis	Men's Doubles - Class MD4	27 October
Bronze	Iran men's national wheelchair basketball team: Mahdi Abbasi; Morteza Abedi; Amirreza Ahmadi; Vahid Saadatpoor; Omid Hadizhar; Hakim Mansouri; Abdoljalil Gharanjik; Mohammad Mohammadnezhad; Mohammadhassan Sayari; Mohsen Bigdeli; Mohsen Tolouei; Abolfazl Jalaei	Wheelchair basketball	Men's Team	27 October
Bronze	Mohammadreza Zandi	Archery	Men's Individual - W1 Open	28 October
Bronze	Leila Zarezadeh	Chess	Women's Individual Rapid VI-B1	28 October
Bronze	Atefeh Naghavi	Chess	Women's Individual Rapid VI-B2/B3	28 October
Bronze	Nikoo Rozbahani	Powerlifting	Women's +86 kg	28 October

=== Multiple medalists ===
Multiple medalists
Name	Sport	Gold	Silver	Bronze	Total
Maliheh Shafaei	Chess	4	0	0	4
Sina Zeyghaminejad	Swimming	3	1	0	4
Zahra Nemati	Archery	2	1	0	3
Leila Zarezadeh	Archery	2	0	1	3
Gholamreza Rahimi	Archery	2	0	0	2
Mohammadreza Arab Ameri	Archery	2	0	0	2
Alireza Zare	Athletics	2	0	0	2
Mehrdad Moradi	Athletics	2	0	0	2
Samira Aghaei	Chess	2	0	0	2
Alireza Mokhtari	Athletics	1	1	0	2
Mahdi Olad	Athletics	1	1	0	2
Parastoo Habibi	Athletics	1	1	0	2
Elham Salehi	Athletics	1	0	1	2
Rashid Masjedi	Athletics	1	0	1	2
Shahin Izadyar	Swimming	0	2	3	5
Atefeh Naghavi	Chess	0	2	1	3
Vahid Alinajimi	Athletics	0	2	0	2
Zafar Zaker	Athletics	0	2	0	2
Abolfazl Kazemian	Chess	0	2	0	2
Amir Rabbi	Chess	0	2	0	2
Maryam Rahimzadeh	Chess	0	2	0	2
Fatemeh Rahimi	Chess	0	2	0	2
Alireza Ghoorchibeygi	Chess	0	1	2	3
Mohammadhossein Karimi	Swimming	0	1	2	3
Hadi Moshirabadi	Chess	0	1	1	2
Mohammadreza Alizadeh	Chess	0	1	1	2
Maryam Yavarpoor	Archery	0	0	2	2
Hassan Janfeshan	Chess	0	0	2	2

== See also ==
- Iran at the 2022 Asian Games
