= Fadli Immammuddin =

Indonesian former motorcycle racer

- Nationality: Indonesian
- Born: Muhammad Fadli Immammuddin; 25 July 1984 (age 42); Cibinong, Bogor Regency, Indonesia
Motorcycle racing career statistics
Moto2 World Championship
Active years	2013
Manufacturers	Motobi
2013 championship position	NC (0 pts)
Starts / Wins / Podiums / Poles / F. laps / Points; 1 / 0 / 0 / 0 / 0 / 0

Medal record

Para-cycling

Representing Indonesia

World Abilitysport Games
Gold medal – first place	2023 Nakhon Ratchasima	Time trial C4
Gold medal – first place	2023 Nakhon Ratchasima	Road race C4
Gold medal – first place	2023 Nakhon Ratchasima	Pursuit C4-5
Silver medal – second place	2023 Nakhon Ratchasima	Kilo C4-5
Silver medal – second place	2023 Nakhon Ratchasima	Scratch race C4-5
Silver medal – second place	2023 Nakhon Ratchasima	Omnium C4-5

Asian Para Games
Gold medal – first place	2018 Jakarta	Pursuit C4
Gold medal – first place	2022 Hangzhou	Time trial C4-5
Gold medal – first place	2026 Aichi–Nagoya	Pursuit C4
Silver medal – second place	2018 Jakarta	Time trial C4
Silver medal – second place	2022 Hangzhou	Pursuit C4-5
Bronze medal – third place	2018 Jakarta	Team sprint C1–5
Bronze medal – third place	2022 Hangzhou	Team sprint C1-5

Asian Championships
Gold medal – first place	2019 Tashkent	Road race C4
Gold medal – first place	2019 Jincheon	Pursuit C4-C5
Gold medal – first place	2024 New Delhi	Kilo C4
Gold medal – first place	2024 New Delhi	Pursuit C4

ASEAN Para Games
Silver medal – second place	2017 Kuala Lumpur	Time trial C4
Silver medal – second place	2017 Kuala Lumpur	Pursuit C4
Bronze medal – third place	2017 Kuala Lumpur	Road race C4
Bronze medal – third place	2017 Kuala Lumpur	Kilometer C4

Muhammad Fadli Immammuddin (born 25 July 1984) is an Indonesian paralympic cyclist and former motorcycle racer.

== Early career ==
Faldi began racing in 2001 by participating in regional championships in scooter class, riding modified Vespa scooters. Throughout the 2000s, he competed in both regional and national championships in Indonesia, varied from 110cc novice underbone to 115cc seeded underbone. He won the 115cc underbone class of Asia Road Racing Championship (ARRC) in 2004. In the same year, he won gold medal in motorcycling in the 2004 Pekan Olahraga Nasional (team 4-stroke 110cc) and silver in individual 2-stroke underbone class. In general, he has achieved 6 national titles in various classes (4-stroke 110cc 2004, Indoprix 2007 in both MP1 and MP2 classes, Indonesia Racing Series or IRS 2010–11, and IRS in Supersport 600cc class 2013). He also raced in ARRC Supersport 600 class until 2015 season.

== Moto2 World Championship ==
Fadli took part in the 2013 Malaysian motorcycle Grand Prix. He raced for JiR Moto2 team as a replacement for Mike di Meglio. Unfortunately, he was caught in a crash that took down other riders including Zaqhwan Zaidi, Axel Pons, and Decha Kraisart shortly before the second lap. The Cibinong-born rider was unable to restart the race. Fadli's participation there remains his sole appearance in the Grand Prix racing.

== Later career ==
During the 2015 Indonesian Round of Supersport 600 ARRC at Sentul International Circuit, Fadli was celebrating his Race 2 victory in front of the local crowd when he was hit from the back by a Thai rider, Jakkrit Sawangswat. The crash was inevitable and he was badly injured that later the injury required him to have his left leg amputated. This marked the end of his professional motorcycle racing career.

After the incident, it was reported that Sawangswat lost his motivation to race and gave up racing, possibly being pressured by the guilt over the incident at Sentul. However, Fadli himself traveled to Thailand to personally meet the Thai rider, telling him to forget about the incident and continue racing again. The two riders now have become best friends.

In 2018, Fadli started his career in auto racing by participating in Indonesia Sentul Series of Motorsport (ISSOM) and national level one-make race series.

== Paracycling career ==
After recovering from his injuries sustained from his career-ending motorcycle crash, Fadli became a para-cycling athlete as he joined Indonesia national para-cycling team in 2017. He made his debut in 2017 Asian Cycling Championships, finishing fourth in time-trial C4 class. He represented Indonesia in 2018 Asian Para Games in several classes of cycling. He won a silver medal in Road Cycling C4 class (which took place at Sentul International Circuit), and a gold in Track Cycling Pursuit C4 class.

Fadli was part of Indonesia national team in 2018 UCI Para-cycling Road World Championship and 2019 UCI Para-cycling Track World Championships. He earned gold in C4 category of para-cycling in 2019 Asian Road Cycling Championships, gold in individual pursuit C4 category of para-cycling in 2019 Asian Track Cycling Championships, and gold at 2019 Asian Track Championship in Jincheon, South Korea.

Fadli participated in 2020 Summer Paralympics, where he finished 17th in Men's time trial C4–5 and 6th in Men's individual pursuit C4. In the 2024 event, he finished 20th in Men's C4-5 road race and qualified tenth in Men's individual pursuit C4. He won gold in Individual Pursuit C4 at 2026 Asian Para Games, defeating Iranian cyclist Behrooz Farzad and set the new record at 4 minutes and 50,169 seconds.

== Awards and nominations ==
Award	Year	Category	Result	Ref.
Golden Award SIWO PWI	2019	Favorite Male Para Athlete	Won	
Indonesian Sport Awards	2018	Favorite Male Para Athlete Individual	Nominated	

== Career statistics ==
=== By season ===
Season	Class	Motorcycle	Team	Number	Race	Win	Podium	Pole	FLap	Pts	Plcd
2013	Moto2	Motobi	JiR Moto2	62	1	0	0	0	0	0	NC
Total					1	0	0	0	0	0	

==== By class ====
Class	Seasons	1st GP	1st Pod	1st Win	Race	Win	Podiums	Pole	FLap	Pts	WChmp
Moto2	2013	2013 Malaysia			1	0	0	0	0	0	0
Total	2013				1	0	0	0	0	0	0

=== Races by year ===
(key)

Year	Class	Bike	1	2	3	4	5	6	7	8	9	10	11	12	13	14	15	16	17	Pos	Pts
2013	Moto2	Motobi	QAT	AME	SPA	FRA	ITA	CAT	NED	GER	INP	CZE	GBR	RSM	ARA	MAL; Ret	AUS	JPN	VAL	NC	0
