= South Korea at the 2022 Asian Para Games =

- IPC code: KOR
- NPC: Korean Paralympic Committee

in Hangzhou, China 22-28 October 2023
- Flag bearers: Joo Jeong-hun, Kim Hee-Jin and Kim Young-gun
- Medals Ranked 3rd: Gold 30 Silver 33 Bronze 40 Total 103

Asian Para Games appearances (overview)
- 2010; 2014; 2018; 2022; 2026

South Korea took part in the 2022 Asian Para Games in Hangzhou, China, held from the 22nd to 28th of October, 2023. The games were originally scheduled for the 9th to 15th of October 2022, but were postponed in May 2022 because of issues caused by the ongoing COVID-19 pandemic. The games retained their 2022 designation, despite being held in 2023.

South Korea sent a delegation of 345 athletes and officials to the Para Games, and competed in 21 different sports. The South Korean team was the 15th team to enter the stadium during the opening ceremonies on Sunday 22 October, and were led by their flag bearers, Joo Jeong-hun, who competes in taekwondo, and Kim Hee-Jin who competes in goalball. The South Korean flag bearer at the October 28 closing ceremonies was Kim Young-gun, who had won a silver medal in table tennis.

South Korea finished in fourth place on the medal table, which had been their aim before the games, coming behind China, Iran and Japan, and only just beating India due to a gold medal advantage despite winning fewer medals in total. At the final tally they had won a total of 103 medals, 30 gold, 33 silver, and 40 bronze.

South Korea's most successful sport was table tennis, where they won 28 medals in total, more than a quarter of their overall medals. South Korean table tennis players won 9 golds, 5 silvers and 14 bronzes.

== Records ==
Cyclist Kim Jung-been set a new games record in the men's Class B 4,000 meter individual pursuit. The record, which he set in the qualifying heat, was 4 minutes and 32.549 seconds.

== Medal summary ==
=== Medal by sport ===
Medals by sport
Sport	1st place, gold medalist(s)	2nd place, silver medalist(s)	3rd place, bronze medalist(s)	Total
Swimming	1	6	1	8
Athletics	1	3	2	6
Wheelchair tennis	?	?	?	?
Cycling	4	0	4	8
Table tennis	9	5	14	28
Badminton	0	3	5	8
Judo	1	0	0	1
Wheelchair basketball	0	1	0	1
Archery	1	2	0	3
Goalball	0	0	1	1
Taekwondo	1	0	1	2
Wheelchair fencing	?	?	?	?
Boccia	2	4	1	7
Rowing	0	2	0	2
Shooting	3	3	3	9
Powerlifting	0	0	2	2
Lawn bowls	4	4	2	10
Go	1	?	?	?
Total	30	33	40	103
