= Hong Kong at the 2022 Asian Para Games =

- IPC code: HKG
- NPC: China Hong Kong Paralympic Committee
- Website: www.paralympic.hk

in Hangzhou, China 22 October 2023 – 28 October 2023
- Competitors: 98 in 11 sports
- Medals Ranked 10th: Gold 8 Silver 15 Bronze 24 Total 47

Asian Para Games appearances (overview)
- 2010; 2014; 2018; 2022

Hong Kong competed at the 2022 Asian Para Games in Hangzhou, Zhejiang, China, from 22 October 2023 to 28 October 2023. However, due to COVID-19 pandemic cases rising in China the event was postponed and rescheduled to October 2023. These were the first games contested by Hong Kong under the Hong Kong Paralympic Committee umbrella, following its split with Hong Kong Sports Association for the Physically Disabled on 1 April 2022.

== See also ==
- Hong Kong at the 2022 Asian Games
