= India at the 2022 Asian Para Games =

- IPC code: IND
- NPC: Paralympic Committee of India

in Hangzhou, China 22–28 October 2023
- Competitors: 309 (196 men and 113 women) in 17 sports
- Flag bearers (opening): Amit Kumar Saroha; Parul Parmar
- Flag bearer (closing): TBD
- Medals Ranked 6th: Gold 27 Silver 32 Bronze 49 Total 108

Asian Para Games appearances (overview)
- 2010; 2014; 2018; 2022; 2026

India competed at the 2022 Asian Para Games in Hangzhou, Zhejiang, China, from 22 October 2023 to 28 October 2023. Due to COVID-19 pandemic cases rising in China the event was postponed and rescheduled to October 2023.

India had its best ever medal haul beating the previous best medal haul of 72 achieved at the 2018 Asian Para Games, crossing the 100 medal mark for the first time in history.

== Medalists ==
=== Medals by sport ===
Medals by sport
Sport	Gold	Silver	Bronze	Total
Athletics	16	16	16	48
Badminton	4	4	13	21
Archery	2	3	2	7
Shooting	2	2	2	6
Chess	2	1	5	8
Paracanoe	1	1	2	4
Powerlifting	0	1	2	3
Judo	0	1	1	2
Rowing	0	1	0	1
Table tennis	0	0	2	2
Swimming	0	0	1	1
Taekwondo	0	0	1	1
Total	27	31	51	109

=== Medals by gender ===
Medals by gender
Gender	Gold	Silver	Bronze	Total
Male	18	20	31	69
female	7	9	17	33
Mixed/Open	1	2	3	7
Total	27	32	49	108

=== Medals by day ===
Medals by date
Day	Date	Gold medal	Silver medal	Bronze medal	Total
Day 1	23 Oct	6	6	5	17
Day 2	24 Oct	2	6	7	15
Day 3	25 Oct	6	8	15	29
Day 4	26 Oct	3	3	13	19
Day 5	27 Oct	7	6	4	17
Day 6	28 Oct	3	3	5	12
Total		27	32	49	108

=== Medalists ===
Medal	Name	Sport	Event	Date
Gold	Pranav Soorma	Athletics	Men's Club Throw-F51	23 October
Gold	Shailesh Kumar	Athletics	Men's High Jump-T63	23 October
Gold	Nishad Kumar	Athletics	Men's High Jump-T47	23 October
Gold	Ankur Dhama	Athletics	Men's 5000m-T11	23 October
Gold	Praveen Kumar	Athletics	Men's High Jump-T64	23 October
Gold	Avani Lekhara	Shooting	Women's 10m AR Stand SH1	23 October
Gold	Prachi Yadav	Canoeing	Women's KL2	24 October
Gold	Deepthi Jeevanji	Athletics	Women's 400m-T20	24 October
Gold	Neeraj Yadav (Note: After Neeraj Yadav (para-athlete) failed doping tests, his medals were suspended.)	Athletics	Men's Discus Throw-F54/55/56	24 October
Gold	Sumit Antil	Athletics	Men's Javelin Throw Throw-F64	25 October
Gold	Haney (para athlete)	Athletics	Men's Javelin Throw Throw-F37/38	25 October
Gold	Sundar Singh Gurjar	Athletics	Men's Javelin Throw Throw-F46	25 October
Gold	Ankur Dhama	Athletics	Men's 1500m-T11	25 October
Gold	Rakshitha Raju	Athletics	Women's 1500m-T11	25 October
Gold	Nimisha Chakkungalparambil	Athletics	Women's Long Jump-T47	25 October
Gold	Rakesh Kumar Sheetal Devi	Archery	Mixed Team Compound - Open	26 October
Gold	Sidhartha Babu	Shooting	Mixed 50m Rifle Prone	26 October
Gold	Sachin Sarjerao Khilari	Athletics	Men's Shot Put-F46	26 October
Gold	Sheetal Devi	Archery	Women's Individual Compound - Open	27 October
Gold	Suhas Lalinakere Yathiraj	Badminton	Men's Singles SL4	27 October
Gold	Pramod Bhagat	Badminton	Men's Singles SL3	27 October
Gold	Thulasimathi Murugesan	Badminton	Women's Singles SU5	27 October
Gold	Tarun Dhillon; Nitesh Kumar	Badminton	Men's DOUBLES SL3-SL4	27 October
Gold	Raman Sharma	Athletics	Men's 1500m-T38	27 October
Gold	Solairaj Dharmaraj	Athletics	Men's Long Jump-T64	27 October
Gold	Darpan Inani	Chess	Men's Individual Rapid VI-B1	28 October
Gold	Darpan Inani Soundarya Kumar Pradhan Ashwin Makwana	Chess	Men's Team Rapid VI-B1	28 October
Gold	Neeraj Yadav	Athletics	Men's Javelin Throw Throw-F55	28 October
Gold	Dilip Gavit	Athletics	Men's 400m-T47	28 October
Silver	Prachi Yadav	Canoeing	Women's VL2	23 October
Silver	Kapil Parmar	Judo	Men -60 kg J1	23 October
Silver	Rudransh Khandelwal	Shooting	Mixed 50m Pistol SH1	23 October
Silver	Dharambeer	Athletics	Men's Club Throw-F51	23 October
Silver	Ram Pal	Athletics	Men's High Jump-T47	23 October
Silver	Mariyappan Thangavelu	Athletics	Men's High Jump-T63	23 October
Silver	Rudransh Khandelwal	Shooting	Men's 10m Air Pistol SH1	24 October
Silver	Simran Sharma	Athletics	Women's 100m-T12	24 October
Silver	Ajay Kumar	Athletics	Men's 400m-T64	24 October
Silver	Yogesh Kathuniya	Athletics	Men's Discus Throw-F54/55/56	24 October
Silver	Ravi Rongali	Athletics	Men's Shot Put-F40	24 October
Silver	Pramod	Athletics	Men's 1500m-T46	24 October
Silver	Sheetal Devi Sarita Devi	Archery	Women's Doubles Compound - Open	25 October
Silver	Rakesh Kumar Suraj Singh	Archery	Men's Doubles Compound - Open	25 October
Silver	Zainab Khatoon	Powerlifting	Women's -61 kg	25 October
Silver	Pooja Yadav	Athletics	Women's Discus Throw-F54/55	25 October
Silver	Soman Rana	Athletics	Men's Shot Put-F57	25 October
Silver	Rinku	Athletics	Men's Javelin Throw Throw-F46	25 October
Silver	Lalitha Killaka	Athletics	Women's 1500m-T11	25 October
Silver	Bhagyashree Jadhav	Athletics	Women's Shot Put-F34	26 October
Silver	Monu Ghanghas	Athletics	Men's Discus Throw-F11	26 October
Silver	Simran Sharma	Athletics	Women's 200m-T12	26 October
Silver	Rakesh Kumar	Archery	Men's Individual Compound - Open	27 October
Silver	Krishna Nagar	Badminton	Men's Singles SH6	27 October
Silver	Manasi Joshi Thulasimathi Murugesan	Badminton	Women's Doubles SL3-SU5	27 October
Silver	Nitesh Kumar	Badminton	Men's Singles SL3	27 October
Silver	Chirag Baretha Raj Kumar	Badminton	Men's Doubles SU5	27 October
Silver	Pradeep Kumar	Athletics	Men's Javelin Throw Throw-F54	27 October
Silver	Soundarya Kumar Pradhan	Chess	Men's Individual Rapid VI-B1	October 28
Silver	Narayana Konganapalle Anita	Rowing	PR3 Mixed Double Sculls	October 28
Bronze	Kokila Kaushiklate	Judo	Women -48 kg J2	23 October
Bronze	Aruna Tanwar	Taekwondo	Women's K44 -47kg	23 October
Bronze	Amit Kumar	Athletics	Men's Club Throw-F51	23 October
Bronze	Unni Renu	Athletics	Men's High Jump-T64	23 October
Bronze	Monu Ghanghas	Athletics	Men's Shot Put-F11	23 October
Bronze	Manish Kaurav	Canoeing	Men's KL3	24 October
Bronze	Gajendra Singh	Canoeing	Men's VL2	24 October
Bronze	Manish Narwal	Shooting	Men's 10m Air Pistol SH1	24 October
Bronze	Rubina Francis	Shooting	Women's 10m Air Pistol SH1	24 October
Bronze	Ekta Bhyan	Athletics	Women's Club Throw-F32/51	24 October
Bronze	Muthuraja	Athletics	Men's Discus Throw-F54/55/56	24 October
Bronze	Rakesh Bhaira	Athletics	Men's 1500m-T46	24 October
Bronze	Ashok	Powerlifting	Men's -65 kg	24 October
Bronze	Harvinder Singh Sahil	Archery	Men's Doubles Recurve - Open	25 October
Bronze	Vaishnavi Puneyani	Badminton	Women's Singles SL4	25 October
Bronze	Sivarajan Solaimalai Nithya Sre Sivan	Badminton	Mixed Doubles SH6	25 October
Bronze	Nitesh Kumar Thulasimathi Murugesan	Badminton	Mixed Doubles SL3-SU5	25 October
Bronze	Pramod Bhagat Manisha Ramadass	Badminton	Mixed Doubles SL3-SU5	25 October
Bronze	Nithya Sre Sivan Rachana Patel	Badminton	Women's doubles SH6	25 October
Bronze	Mandeep Kaur	Badminton	Women's Singles SL3	25 October
Bronze	Manasi Joshi	Badminton	Women's Singles SL3	25 October
Bronze	Himanshi Rathi	Chess	Women's Individual Standard VI-B1	25 October
Bronze	Raj Kumari	Powerlifting	Women's -61 kg	25 October
Bronze	Bhavina Patel	Table tennis	Women's Singles	25 October
Bronze	Sandeep Dangi	Table tennis	Men's Singles	25 October
Bronze	Pushpendra Singh	Athletics	Men's Javelin Throw Throw-F64	25 October
Bronze	Narayan Thakur	Athletics	Men's 200m-T35	25 October
Bronze	Shreyansh Trivedi	Athletics	Men's 200m-T37	25 October
Bronze	Sema Hokato Hotozhe	Athletics	Men's Shot Put	25 October
Bronze	Ajeet Singh	Athletics	Men's Javelin Throw Throw-F46	25 October
Bronze	Adil Ansari Naveen Dalal	Archery	Men's Doubles - W1 Open	26 October
Bronze	Narayan Thakur	Athletics	Men's 100m-T35	26 October
Bronze	Rohit Kumar	Athletics	Men's Shot Put-F46	26 October
Bronze	Shreyansh Trivedi	Athletics	Men's 100m-T37	26 October
Bronze	Sukant Kadam	Badminton	Men's Singles SL4	27 October
Bronze	Krishna Nagar Shivarajan Solaimalai	Badminton	Men's Doubles SH6	27 October
Bronze	Mandeep Kaur Manisha Ramadass	Badminton	Women's Doubles SL3-SU5	27 October
Bronze	Manisha Ramadass	Badminton	Women's Singles SU5	27 October
Bronze	Ashwin Makwana	Chess	Men's Individual Rapid VI-B1	28 October
Bronze		Chess	Men's Team Rapid VI-B2/B3	28 October
Bronze	Himanshi Rathi, Sanskruti More, Vruthi Jain	Chess	Women's Team Rapid VI-B1	28 October
Bronze	Kishan Gangoli	Chess	Men's Individual Rapid VI-B2/B3	28 October
Bronze	Tek Chand	Athletics	Men's Javelin Throw Throw-F55	28 October
Bronze	Pooja	Athletics	Women's 1500m-T20	28 October

== Competitors ==
List of sports and numbers of athletes that participated at the 2022 Asian Para Games:

Sport	Men	Women	Total
Archery	8	5	13
Athletics	88	35	123
Badminton	17	12	29
Blind Football	8	—N/a	8
Boccia	2	2	4
Canoeing	5	5	10
Chess	9	9	18
Cycling	5	2	7
Judo	4	6	10
Lawn bowls	6	6	12
Powerlifting	6	9	15
Rowing	1	1	2
Shooting	10	5	15
Swimming	10	3	13
Table tennis	8	5	13
Taekwondo	2	3	5
Wheelchair fencing	5	5	10
Total	196	113	309

== Archery ==
Compound

Athlete	Event	Ranking round		Round of 32	Round of 16	Quarterfinals	Semifinals	Final / BM	Rank
Athlete	Event	Score	Seed	Opposition Score	Opposition Score	Opposition Score	Opposition Score	Opposition Score	Rank
Rakesh Kumar	Men's individual	699	3Q	—N/a	Julin (MAS); Won 145-138	Nori (IRI); Won 146-137	Wu (TPE); Won 145-142	Manshaezadeh (IRI); Lost 144-144 (9-10)	2nd place, silver medalist(s)
Shyam Sundar Swami	Men's individual	686	9	Did not advance to next round					
Suraj Singh	Men's individual	694	4Q	—N/a	Inkaew (THA); Won 145-141	Swagumilang (INA); Lost 142-144	Did not advance to next round		
Jyoti Baliyan	Women's individual	664	9	Did not advance to next round					
Sarita Devi	Women's individual	675	4Q	—N/a	Jalil (MAS); Won 135-115	Zhang (CHN); Won 143-136	Devi (IND); Lost 142-143	Lin (CHN); Lost 138-144	4
Sheetal Devi	Women's individual	680	1Q	—N/a	Chan (HKG); Won 142-128	Choi (KOR); Won 145-137	Sarita (IND); Won 143-142	Syahidah (SGP); Won 144-142	1st place, gold medalist(s)
Rakesh Kumar; Suraj Singh	Men's doubles	1393	2Q	—N/a		Philippines (PHI); Won 158-153	Chinese Taipei (TPE); Won 154-152	China (CHN); Lost 150-155	2nd place, silver medalist(s)
Sheetal Devi; Sarita Devi	Women's doubles	1355	1Q	—N/a		Hong Kong (HKG); Won 140-118	South Korea (KOR); Won 154-146	China (CHN); Lost 150-152	2nd place, silver medalist(s)
Sheetal Devi; Rakesh Kumar	Mixed doubles	1379	2Q	—N/a		Kazakhstan (KAZ); Won 155-141	Iran (IRI); Won 152-150	China (CHN); Won 151-149	1st place, gold medalist(s)

Recurve

Athlete	Event	Ranking round		Round of 32	Round of 16	Quarterfinals	Semifinals	Final / BM	Rank
Athlete	Event	Score	Seed	Opposition Score	Opposition Score	Opposition Score	Opposition Score	Opposition Score	Rank
Dhanna Ram Godara	Men's individual	DNS	—N/a	Did not advance to next round					
Harvinder Singh	Men's individual	634	6	Alom (BAN); Won 7-1	Selvathamby (MAS); Won 6-2	Lixue (CHN); Lost 0-6	Did not advance to next round		
Sahil Gautam	Men's individual	582	17	Rigsel (BHU); Won 6-4	Rahimi (IRI); Lost 2-6	Did not advance to next round			
Pooja Jatyan	Women's individual	604	3Q	—N/a	Akter (BAN); Won 6-2	Jo (KOR); Won 6-2	Nemati (IRI); Lost 0-6	Chunyan (CHN); Lost 4-6	4
Pooja Khanna	Women's individual	541	16Q	Samyibek (KGZ); Won 6-0	Nemati (IRI); Lost 0-6	Did not advance to next round			
Harvinder Singh; Sahil Gautam	Men's doubles	1216	3Q	—N/a		Indonesia (INA); Won 5-4	China (CHN); Lost 2-6	Thailand (THA); Won 6-0	3rd place, bronze medalist(s)
Pooja Khanna; Pooja Jatyan	Women's doubles	1145	4Q	—N/a		South Korea (KOR); Lost 4-5	Did not advance to next round		
Harvinder Singh; Pooja Jatyan	Mixed doubles	1238	3Q	—N/a		Thailand (THA); Lost 2-6	Did not advance to next round		

W1

Athlete	Event	Ranking round		Round of 32	Round of 16	Quarterfinals	Semifinals	Final / BM	Rank
Athlete	Event	Score	Seed	Opposition Score	Opposition Score	Opposition Score	Opposition Score	Opposition Score	Rank
Adil Ansari	Men's individual	609	7Q	Yung (HKG); Won 131-113	Zandi (IRI); Lost 129-136	Did not advance to next round			
Naveen Dalal	Men's individual	518	11Q	Samutchaiyakij (THA); Lost 107-129	Did not advance to next round				
Adil Ansari; Naveen Dalal	Men's doubles	1127	3Q	—N/a			South Korea (KOR); Lost 113-133	Kazakhstan (KAZ); Won 125-120	3rd place, bronze medalist(s)

== Athletics ==
=== Track ===
Men

Athlete	Event	Class	Heat		Final	
Athlete	Event	Class	Time	Rank	Time	Rank
Narayan Thakur	100m	T35	—N/a	—N/a	14.37	3rd place, bronze medalist(s)
Ravi Kumar	100m	T35	—N/a	—N/a	14.74	5
Chirag	100m	T36	—N/a	—N/a	15.51	6
Shreyansh Trivedi	100m	T37	—N/a	—N/a	25.26	3rd place, bronze medalist(s)
Manoj Bhaskar	100m	T44	—N/a	—N/a	12.48	7
Vijay Kumar	100m	T44	—N/a	—N/a	12.34	5
Vinay Kumar	100m	T44	—N/a	—N/a	DSQ	—N/a
Sheikh Abdul Kadhar	100m	T47	—N/a	—N/a	11.31	5
Manoj Kumar Sabapathi	100m	T54	16.83	11	did not advance	
Vijay Kumar	100m	T63	—N/a	—N/a		
Pranav Desai	100m	T64	—N/a	—N/a	11.91	4
Narayan Thakur	200m	T35	—N/a	—N/a	29.83	3rd place, bronze medalist(s)
Ravi Kumar	200m	T35	—N/a	—N/a	31.28	5
Shreyansh Trivedi	200m	T37	—N/a	—N/a	25.26	3rd place, bronze medalist(s)
Pranav Desai	200m	T64	—N/a	—N/a	24.24	4
Madan	400m	T11	57.56	2	Didn't advance	
Mohammad Arif	400m	T12	55.18	3Q		
Khodaji Thakor	400m	T12	1:03.71	2	Did not advance	
Dilip Gavit	400m	T47				
Jasbeer	400m	T47				
Ajay Kumar	400m	T64	—N/a	—N/a	54.85	2nd place, silver medalist(s)
Vijay Kumar	400m	T64	—N/a	—N/a	Did not finish	—N/a
Vinay Kumar Lal	400m	T64	—N/a	—N/a	55.49	4
Ankur Dhama	1500m	T11	—N/a	—N/a	4:27.70	1st place, gold medalist(s)
Keshavmurthy Gururaju	1500m	T11	—N/a	—N/a	Disqualified	—N/a
Sharath Shankarappa	1500m	T13	—N/a	—N/a	4:13.60	2nd place, silver medalist(s)
Raman Sharma	1500m	T38	—N/a	—N/a	4:20.80	1st place, gold medalist(s)
Rakesh Bhaira	1500m	T46	—N/a	—N/a	4:11.09	3rd place, bronze medalist(s)
Pramod	1500m	T46	—N/a	—N/a	4:09.25	2nd place, silver medalist(s)
Sandeep	1500m	T46	—N/a	—N/a	Did not finish	—N/a
Ankur Dhama	5000m	T11	—N/a	—N/a	16:37.29	1st place, gold medalist(s)
Sharath Shankarappa	5000m	T13	—N/a	—N/a	20:18.90	1

Women

Athlete	Event	Class	Heat		Final	
Athlete	Event	Class	Time	Rank	Time	Rank
Simran Sharma	100m	T12	—N/a	—N/a	12.68	2nd place, silver medalist(s)
Preeti Pal	100m	T35	—N/a	—N/a	15.24	4
Devika Malik	100m	T37	—N/a	—N/a	17.02	4
Jayanti Behera	100m	T47	—N/a	—N/a	13.66	8
Salini Saraswathi	100m	T64	—N/a	—N/a	18.53	4
Ishwari Nishad	200m	T11	35.06	3	Didn't advance	
Simran Sharma	200m	T12	26.00	2Q	26.12	2nd place, silver medalist(s)
Preeti Pal	200m	T35	—N/a	—N/a	32.19	4
Jayanti Behera	200m	T47	—N/a	—N/a	27.85	7
Lalitha Killaka	400m	T11	1:06.86	3	Didn't advance	
Radha Venkatesh	400m	T12	1:07.48	2Q		
Simran Sharma	400m	T12	DQ			
Deepthi Jeevanji	400m	T20	—N/a	—N/a	56.69	1st place, gold medalist(s)
Pooja	400m	T20	—N/a	—N/a	DQ	
Jayanti Behera	400m	T47	—N/a	—N/a		
Rakshitha Raju	1500m	T11	—N/a	—N/a	5:21.45	1st place, gold medalist(s)
Lalitha Killaka	1500m	T11	—N/a	—N/a	5:48.85	2nd place, silver medalist(s)
Radha Venkatesh	1500m	T13	—N/a	—N/a		

=== Field ===
Men

Athlete	Event	Class	Final	
Athlete	Event	Class	Result	Rank
Rampal Chahar	High jump	T47	1.94	2nd place, silver medalist(s)
Nishad Kumar	High jump	T47	2.02 AR	1st place, gold medalist(s)
Mariyappan Thangavelu	High jump	T63	1.80	2nd place, silver medalist(s)
Ramsingh Padhiyar	High jump	T63	1.78	3
Shailesh Kumar	High jump	T63	1.82	1st place, gold medalist(s)
Shyam Injamuri	High jump	T64	1.75	5
Unni Renu	High jump	T64	1.95	3rd place, bronze medalist(s)
Praveen Kumar	High jump	T64	2.02 GR	1st place, gold medalist(s)
Jagdish Parmar	Long Jump	T11	4.81	5
Rakeshbhai Bhatt	Long Jump	T37/38	5.68	4
Mukesh	Long Jump	T37/38	4.81	5
Arjun Singh	Long Jump	T47	6.38	7
Ajay Singh	Long Jump	T47	6.63	5
Vikas	Long Jump	T47	6.58	6
Shailesh Kumar	Long Jump	T63		
Ramsingh Padhiyar	Long Jump	T63		
Mit Patel	Long Jump	T63		
Solairaj Dharmaraj	Long Jump	T64	6.80AR	1st place, gold medalist(s)
Pradeep	Long Jump	T64		
Someswara Rao Ramudri	Long Jump	T64		
Monu Ghanghas	Discus throw	F11	37.87	2nd place, silver medalist(s)
Balaji Rajendran	Discus throw	F11	27.40	6
Rishi Raj Rathore	Discus throw	F37	44.13	7
Krishnappa Babu	Discus throw	F51/52/53	Did not start	—N/a
Pranav Soorma	Discus throw	F51/52/53	Did not Start	—N/a
Dharambir	Discus throw	F51/52/53	Did not start	—N/a
Yogesh Kathuniya	Discus throw	F54/55/56	42.13	2nd place, silver medalist(s)
Muthuraja	Discus throw	F54/55/56	35.06	3rd place, bronze medalist(s)
Neeraj Yadav	Discus throw	F54/55/56	38.56	1st place, gold medalist(s)
Devender Kumar	Discus throw	F64		
Pradeep	Discus throw	F64		
Sourav	Discus throw	F64		
Monu Ghanghas	Shot put	F11	12.33	3rd place, bronze medalist(s)
Balaji Rajendran	Shot put	F11	11.56	5
Sagar	Shot put	F12		
Devershee Sachan	Shot put	F33		
Manu	Shot put	F37		
Mayank	Shot put	F37		
Ravi Rongali	Shot put	F40	9.92	2nd place, silver medalist(s)
Ritender	Shot put	F41		
Sachin Khilari	Shot put	F46	16.03	1st place, gold medalist(s)
Rohit Kumar	Shot put	F46	14.56	3rd place, bronze medalist(s)
Mohmmad Yasser	Shot put	F46	13.84	5
Manihas	Shot put	F55	9.12	6
Muthuraja	Shot put	F55	10.42	3rd place, bronze medalist(s)
Neeraj Yadav	Shot put	F55	9.57	5
Sema Hotoze	Shot put	F57	13.94	3rd place, bronze medalist(s)
Soman Rana	Shot put	F57	14.42	2nd place, silver medalist(s)
Virender	Shot put	F57	13.48	4
Dinesh Chaudhary	Shot put	F63	12.24	4
Rishikant Sharma	Javelin throw	F13	51.77	5
Manjeet	Javelin throw	F13	54.43	4
Boby	Javelin throw	F37/38	42.23	6
Haney	Javelin throw	F37/38	55.97	1st place, gold medalist(s)
Navdeep	Javelin throw	F41	40.48	4
Ravi Rongali	Javelin throw	F41	32.23	5
Ajeet Singh Yadav	Javelin throw	F46	63.52	3rd place, bronze medalist(s)
Sundar Singh Gurjar	Javelin throw	F46	68.60 WR AR GR	1st place, gold medalist(s)
Rinku	Javelin throw	F46	67.08	2nd place, silver medalist(s)
Abhishek Chamoli	Javelin throw	F54	NM	
Lakshit	Javelin throw	F54	21.20	3rd place, bronze medalist(s)
Pradeep Kumar	Javelin throw	F54	25.94	2nd place, silver medalist(s)
Manihas	Javelin throw	F55		
Neeraj Yadav	Javelin throw	F55		
Tek Chand	Javelin throw	F55		
Parveen Kumar	Javelin throw	F57	41.31	4
Virender	Javelin throw	F57	21.87	8
Sandeep	Javelin throw	F64	61.84 GR	4
Pushpendra Singh	Javelin throw	F64	62.06	3rd place, bronze medalist(s)
Sumit Antil	Javelin throw	F64	73.29 WR AR GR	1st place, gold medalist(s)
Amit Kumar	Club throw	F51	26.93	3rd place, bronze medalist(s)
Dharambir	Club throw	F51	28.76	2nd place, silver medalist(s)
Pranav Soorma	Club throw	F51	30.01	1st place, gold medalist(s)

Women

Athlete	Event	Class	Final	
Athlete	Event	Class	Result	Rank
Nimisha Chakkungalparambil	Long jump	T47	5.15	1st place, gold medalist(s)
Keerti Chauhan	Long jump	T47	4.42	4
Ekta Bhyan	Club throw	F51	21.66	3rd place, bronze medalist(s)
Poonam Sharma	Javelin Throw	F56	14.98	5
Fatima Khatoon	Javelin Throw	F56	13.99	7

== Badminton ==
=== Men ===
Athlete	Event	Seed	Group stage				Round of 16	Quarterfinals	Semifinals	Final	
Athlete	Event	Seed	Opposition Score	Opposition Score	Opposition Score	Rank	Opposition Score	Opposition Score	Opposition Score	Opposition Score	Rank
Prem Kumar Ale	Singles WH1	6	Shiau-we (TPE); Won 2-0	Hoang (VIE); Won 2-0	Kornpeekanok (THA); Won 2-0	1Q	Ramli (MAS); Lost 0-2	Did not advance to next round			
Shashank Kumar	Singles WH1	—N/a	Sammour (SYR); Won 2-0	Nishimura (JPN); Lost 0-2	—N/a	2Q	Nagashima (JPN); Lost 0-2	Did not advance to next round			
Abu Hubaida	Singles WH2	—N/a	Noorlan (MAS); Lost 0-2	Matsumoto (JPN); Lost 0-2	Truong (VIE); Lost 0-2	4	Did not advance to next round				
Pramod Bhagat	Singles SL3	1	Huang (TPE); Won 2-0	Latheef (MDV); Won 2-0	—N/a	1Q	—N/a	Lichaun (CHN); Won 2-0	Bunsun (THA); Won 2-0	Nitesh (IND); Won 2-1	1st place, gold medalist(s)
Manoj Sarkar	Singles SL3	4	Gohar (PAK); Won 2-0	Lichaun (CHN); Won 2-0	—N/a	1Q	—N/a	Bunsun (THA); Lost 1-2	Did not advance to next round		
Nitesh Kumar	Singles SL3	2	Dwiyoko (INA); Won 2-0	Xiaoyu (CHN); Won 2-0	—N/a	1Q	—N/a	Anh Tuấn (VIE); Won 2-0	Fujihara (JPN); Won 2-0	Bhagat (IND); Lost 1-2	2nd place, silver medalist(s)
Sukant Kadam	Singles SL4	3	Yeh (TPE); Won 2-0	Fayaz (MDV); Won 2-0	—N/a	1Q	—N/a	Kyung-hwan (KOR); Won 2-1	Burhanuddin (MAS); Lost 1-2	Did not advance	3rd place, bronze medalist(s)
Suhas Lalinakere Yathiraj	Singles SL4	5	Fu (CHN); Won 2-0	Kyung-hwan (KOR); Won 2-1	Shamin (BAN); Won 2-0	1Q	Dhillon (IND); Won 2-0	Ramdani (INA); Won 2-0	Setiawan (INA); Won 2-0	Burhanuddin (MAS); Won 2-1	1st place, gold medalist(s)
Tarun Dhillon	Singles SL4	2	Burhanuddin (MAS); Lost 2-0	Yuyang (CHN); Won 2-0	—N/a	2Q	Yathiraj (IND); Lost 0-2	Did not advance to next round			
Chirag Baretha	Singles SU5	6	Ming (SGP); Won 2-0	Fareez (MAS); Lost 1-2	—N/a	2Q	Imai (JPN); Lost 0-2	Did not advance to next round			
Ruthick Ragupathi	Singles SU5	5	Gi-yeon (KOR); Won 2-0	Mingpan (CHN); Lost 0-2	—N/a	2Q	Fareez (MAS); Lost 1-2	Did not advance to next round			
Hardik Makkar	Singles SU5	—N/a	Liu (CHN); Won 2-0	Anrimusthi (INA); Lost 0-2	—N/a	2Q	Fang (TPE); Lost 0-2	Did not advance to next round			
Krishna Nagar	Singles SH6	2	Natthapong (THA); Won 2-1	Quingtao (CHN); Won 2-1	Rizk (LBN); Won 2-0	1Q	—N/a	Lee (KOR); Won 2-1	Naili (CHN); Won 2-1	Chu (HKG); Lost 1-2	2nd place, silver medalist(s)
Madhawan Sethu	Singles SH6	—N/a	Hossain (BAN); Won 2-0	Hatakeyama (JPN); Lost 0-2	Subhan (INA); Lost 0-2	3	Did not advance to next round				
Gokul Das Areeparamb Vadakkayil	Singles SH6	—N/a	Dimas (INA); Lost 0-2	Lee (KOR); Lost 0-2	Wong (HKG); Lost 0-2	4	Did not advance to next round				
Prem Kumar Ale; Abu Hubaida	Doubles WH1-WH2	4	Sumpradit / Kornpeekanok (THA); Won 2-0	Hoàng / Trương (HKG); Won 2-0	Dung / Fang (TPE); Won 2-0	1Q	—N/a	Yang / Zhou (CHN); Lost 0-2	Did not advance to next round		
Nitesh Kumar; Tarun Dhillon	Doubles SL3-SL4	2	Ashraf / Alasadi (SYR); Won 2-0	Singha / Teamarrom (THA); Won 2-0	—N/a	1Q	—N/a	Rukaendi / Susanto (INA); Won 2-1	Kyung-hwan / Joo (KOR); Won 2-0	Dwiyoko / Setiawan (INA); Won 2-1	1st place, gold medalist(s)
Pramod Bhagat; Sukant Kadam	Doubles SL3-SL4	1	Rukaendi / Susanto (INA); Won 2-0	Huang / Yeh (TPE); Won 2-0	—N/a	1Q	—N/a	Singha / Teamarrom (THA); Won 2-1	Dwiyoko / Setiawan (INA); Lost 1-2	Did not advance	3rd place, bronze medalist(s)
Chirag Baretha; Raj Kumar	Doubles SU5	1	Yazid / Faris (MAS); Won 2-0	Hiong / Ming (SGP); Won 2-0	—N/a	1Q	—N/a	Bùi / Phạm (VIE); Won 2-1	Fang / Gui-yu (TPE); Won 2-1	Anrimusthi / Briliansyah (INA); Lost 1-2	2nd place, silver medalist(s)
Ruthick Ragupathi; Hardik Makkar	Doubles SU5	3	Nugroho / Listiant (INA); Lost 0-2	Fang / Pu (TPE); Lost 0-2	—N/a	3	Did not advance to next round				
Krishna Nagar; Shivarajan Solaimalai	Doubles SH6	2	Meechai / Yaemmali (THA); Won 2-1	Dimas / Subhan (INA); Lost 0-2	—N/a	2Q	—N/a		Kai / Wong (HKG); Lost 0-2	Did not advance	3rd place, bronze medalist(s)
Akash Madhavan; Gokul Areeparamb Vadakkayil	Doubles SH6	—N/a	Lin / Qingtao (CHN); Lost 0-2	Kai / Wong (HKG); Lost 0-2	—N/a	3	Did not advance to next round				

=== Women ===
Athlete	Event	Seed	Group stage				Round of 16	Quarterfinals	Semifinals	Final	
Athlete	Event	Seed	Opposition Score	Opposition Score	Opposition Score	Rank	Opposition Score	Opposition Score	Opposition Score	Opposition Score	Rank
Ammu Mohan	Singles WH2	—N/a	Liu (CHN); Lost 0-2	Yamazaki (JPN); Lost 0-2	—N/a	3	Did not advance to next round				
Manasi Joshi	Singles SL3	3	Xiao (CHN); Lost 0-2	Henpraiwan (THA); Won 2-0	—N/a	2Q	—N/a	Liu (CHN); Won 2-1	Syakuroh (INA); Lost 0-2	Did not advance	3rd place, bronze medalist(s)
Parul Parmar	Singles SL3	—N/a	Liu (CHN); Lost 0-2	Syakuroh (INA); Lost 0-2	—N/a	3	Did not advance to next round				
Mandeep Kaur	Singles SL3	2	Matar (SYR); Won 2-0	Shabnam (TJK); Won 2-0	—N/a	1Q	—N/a		Xiao (CHN); Lost 0-2	Did not advance	3rd place, bronze medalist(s)
Palak Kohli	Singles SL4	—N/a	Cheng (CHN); Lost RET	—N/a		4	Did not advance to next round				
Jyoti	Singles SL4	—N/a	Sawada (JPN); Lost 0-2	Sadiyah (INA); Lost 0-2	—N/a	3	Did not advance to next round				
Vaishnavi Puneyani	Singles SL4	—N/a	Machlab (LBN); Won 2-0	Fujino (JPN); Won 2-0	—N/a	1Q	—N/a		Oktila (INA); Lost 0-2	Did not advance	3rd place, bronze medalist(s)
Manisha Ramadass	Singles SU5	—N/a	Murugesan (IND); Lost 1-2	Sugino (JPN); Won 2-0	Li (CHN); Won 2-0	2Q	—N/a		Yang (CHN); Lost 0-2	Did not advance	3rd place, bronze medalist(s)
Thulasimathi Murugesan	Singles SU5	—N/a	Ramadass (IND); Won 2-1	Li (CHN); Won 2-0	Sugino (JPN); Won 2-0	1Q	—N/a		Toyoda (JPN); Won 2-0	Yang (CHN); Won 2-0	1st place, gold medalist(s)
Shanthiya Vishwanathan	Singles SU5	—N/a	Yang (CHN); Lost 0-2	Toyoda (JPN); Lost 0-1 RET	Kameyama (JPN) w/o RET	4	Did not advance to next round				
Nithya Sre Sumathy Sivan	Singles SH6	—N/a	Lam (HKG); Won 2-0	Lin (CHN); Lost 0-2	—N/a	2Q	—N/a	Saeyang (THA); Won 2-0	Marlina (INA); Lost 0-2	Did not advance	3rd place, bronze medalist(s)
Rachana Patel	Singles SH6	—N/a	Choi (HKG); Won 2-0	Wu (TPE); Lost 0-2	—N/a	2Q	—N/a	Marlina (INA); Lost 0-2	Did not advance to next round		
Manasi Joshi; Thulasimathi Murugesan	Doubles SL3-SU5	—N/a									
Mandeep Kaur; Manisha Ramadass	Doubles SL3-SU5	—N/a	Li Tongtong / Liu Yuemei (CHN)								
Nithyasre Sivan; Rachana Patel	Doubles SH6	—N/a	Wu Yu-yen / Cai Yi-lin (TPE); L 1-2								

=== Mixed ===
Athlete	Event	Group stage				Round of 16	Quarterfinals	Semifinals	Final	
Athlete	Event	Opposition Score	Opposition Score	Opposition Score	Rank	Opposition Score	Opposition Score	Opposition Score	Opposition Score	Rank
Shashank Kumar; Ammu Mohan	Doubles WH1-WH2	Yu Sooyoung / Kwon Hyunah (KOR); L 0-2	Manh Giang Hoang / Thi Hong Thao Hoang (VIE); L 1-2							
Pramod Bhagat; Manisha Ramadass	Doubles SL3-SU5	Chanida Srinavakul / Chawarat Kittichowattana (THA); W 2-0	Yang Jianyuan / Yang Qiuxia (CHN); L 0-2	Daisuke Fujihara / Akiko Sugino (JPN); W 2-0						
Nitesh Kumar; Thulasimathi Murugesan	Doubles SL3-SU5	Freddy Setiawan / Kalimatus Sadiah (INA); L 0-2	Feras Sheiha / Altaf Matar (SYR); W 2-0	Siripong Teamarrom / Nipada Saensupa (THA); W 2-1						
Krishna Nagar; Rachana Shaileshkumar Patel	Doubles SH6	Zeng Quingtao / Lin Shuangbao (CHN); L 0-2	Chai Saeyang / Natthapong Meechai (THA)							
Sivarajan Somaimala; Sumathy Sivan Nitya Sre	Doubles SH6	Chun Yim Wong / Ching Yung Lam (HKG)	Chen Yi-ying / Cai Yi-lin (TPE); W 2-0							

== Board games – Chess ==
=== Visually impaired ===
==== B1 ====
Athlete	Event	Round 1	Round 2	Round 3	Round 4	Round 5	Round 6	Round 7	Total score	Rank
Athlete	Event	Opposition Score	Opposition Score	Opposition Score	Opposition Score	Opposition Score	Opposition Score	Opposition Score	Total score	Rank
Darpan Inani	Men's individual standard									
Ashwin Makwana	Men's individual standard									
Soundarya Pradhan	Men's individual standard									
Darpan Inani	Men's individual rapid									1st place, gold medalist(s)
Soundarya Pradhan	Men's individual rapid									2nd place, silver medalist(s)
Ashwin Makwana	Men's individual rapid									3rd place, bronze medalist(s)
Darpan Inani; Ashwin Makwana; Soundarya Pradhan	Men's team rapid									1st place, gold medalist(s)
Sanskruti More	Women's individual standard									
Himanshi Rathi	Women's individual standard									3rd place, bronze medalist(s)
Vruthi Jain	Women's individual standard									
Sanskruti More	Women's individual rapid									
Himanshi Rathi	Women's individual rapid									
Vruthi Jain	Women's individual rapid									
Sanskruti More; Himanshi Rathi; Vruthi Jain	Women's team rapid									3rd place, bronze medalist(s)

==== B2/B3 ====
Athlete	Event	Round 1	Round 2	Round 3	Round 4	Round 5	Round 6	Round 7	Total score	Rank
Athlete	Event	Opposition Score	Opposition Score	Opposition Score	Opposition Score	Opposition Score	Opposition Score	Opposition Score	Total score	Rank
Aryan Joshi	Men's individual standard									
Kishan Gangolli	Men's individual standard									
Somendra	Men's individual standard									
Aryan Joshi	Men's individual rapid									
Kishan Gangolli	Men's individual rapid									3rd place, bronze medalist(s)
Somendra	Men's individual rapid									
Aryan Joshi; Kishan Gangolli; Somendra	Men's team rapid									3rd place, bronze medalist(s)
Tijan Gawar	Women's individual standard									
Sarita Karde	Women's individual standard									
Mrunali Pandey	Women's individual standard									
Tijan Gawar	Women's individual rapid									
Sarita Karde	Women's individual rapid									
Mrunali Pandey	Women's individual rapid									
Tijan Gawar; Sarita Karde; Mrunali Pandey	Women's team rapid									

=== Physically impaired ===
Athlete	Event	Round 1	Round 2	Round 3	Round 4	Round 5	Round 6	Round 7	Total score	Rank
Athlete	Event	Opposition Score	Opposition Score	Opposition Score	Opposition Score	Opposition Score	Opposition Score	Opposition Score	Total score	Rank
Naveenkumar Arigala	Men's individual standard									
Akkisetti Ganthimeri	Men's individual standard									
Shashikant Kutwal	Men's individual standard									
Naveenkumar Arigala	Men's individual rapid									
Akkisetti Ganthimeri	Men's individual rapid									
Shashikant Kutwal	Men's individual rapid									
Naveenkumar Arigala; Akkisetti Ganthimeri; Shashikant Kutwal	Men's team rapid									
Rachel Sharon	Women's individual standard									
Charvi Mehta	Women's individual standard									
Prema Raju	Women's individual standard									
Rachel Sharon; Prema Raju	Women's team standard									
Rachel Sharon	Women's individual rapid									
Charvi Mehta	Women's individual rapid									
Prema Raju	Women's individual rapid									

== Boccia ==
=== Individual ===
Athlete	Event	Group stage					Quarterfinals	Semifinals	Final	
Athlete	Event	Opposition Score	Opposition Score	Opposition Score	Opposition Score	Rank	Opposition Score	Opposition Score	Opposition Score	Rank
Sachin Chamaria	Men's BC3	Wah (HKG); Lost 8-2	Masayuki (JPN); Lost 7-4	—N/a	—N/a	3	Did not advance to next round			8
Jatin Kumar Kushwah	Men's BC4	Larypen (THA); Lost 14-0	Wong (HKG); Lost 7-0	Zeng (CHN); Lost 9-2	—N/a	4	Did not advance to next round			11
Anjali Devi	Women's BC3	Choi (KOR); Lost 7-1	Kla-han (THA); Lost 4-2	Sakai (JPN); Lost 2-5	—N/a	4	Did not advance to next round			10
Pooja Gupta	Women's BC4	Fernandez (PHI); Won 5-2	Phonsila (THA); Lost 0-13	—N/a	—N/a	2Q	Lin (CHN); Lost 2-11	Did not advance to next round		6

=== Pair ===
Athlete	Event	Group stage				Semifinals	Final	
Athlete	Event	Opposition Score	Opposition Score	Opposition Score	Rank	Opposition Score	Opposition Score	Rank
Sachin Chamaria; Anjali Devi	Mixed BC3	Hong Kong; Lost 1-12	South Korea; Lost 1-9	Singapore; Lost 2-5	4	Did not advance to next round		8
Jatin Kumar Kushwah; Pooja Gupta	Mixed BC4	Thailand; Lost 0-12	South Korea; Lost 0-10	—N/a	3	Did not advance to next round		6

== Canoeing ==
=== Sprint ===
==== Men ====
Athlete	Event	Heats		Semifinal		Final	
Athlete	Event	Time	Rank	Time	Rank	Time	Rank
Yash Kumar	KL1	—N/a				59.455	4
Sanjeev Kotiya	KL2	—N/a				48.445	5
Manish Kaurav	KL3	44.928	2	44.797	1	44.605	3rd place, bronze medalist(s)
Gajendra Singh	VL2	—N/a				1:01.084	3rd place, bronze medalist(s)
Sanjeev Kotiya	VL3	—N/a				55.826	7
Jai Deep	VL3	—N/a				50.370	4

==== Women ====
Athlete	Event	Final	
Athlete	Event	Time	Rank
Pooja Ojha	KL1	1:14.468	4
Rajni Jha	KL2	1:07.15	5
Prachi Yadav	KL2	54.96	1st place, gold medalist(s)
Shabana	KL3	1:02.627	5
Prachi Yadav	VL2	1:03.147	2nd place, silver medalist(s)
Shabana	VL3	1:10.447	5
Rajni Jha	VL3	1:17.274	7
Sangeeta Rajput	VL3	1:08.760	4

== Cycling ==
=== Men ===
==== Track ====
Athlete	Event	Qualifying round		Final	
Athlete	Event	Timing	Rank	Timing	Rank
Jalaluddin Ansari	C1-3 1000m Time Trial	-			
Arshad Shaik	C1-3 1000m Time Trial	-			
Jalaluddin Ansari	C2 3000m Individual Pursuit				
Arshad Shaik	C2 3000m Individual Pursuit				
Abishek	C1-3 Time Trial				
Arshad Shaik	C1-3 Time Trial				
Yogesh Bhimrao Ahire	H1-5 Time Trial				
Prashant Sudarshan Arkal	H1-5 Time Trial				

==== Road ====
Athlete	Event	Final	
Athlete	Event	Timing	Rank
Abishek	C1-3 Road Race		
Arshad Shaik	C1-3 Road Race		
Yogesh Bhimrao Ahire	H1-5 Road Race		
Prashant Sudarshan Arkal	H1-5 Road Race		

=== Women ===
==== Track ====
Athlete	Event	Qualifying round		Final	
Athlete	Event	Timing	Rank	Timing	Rank
Jyoti Gaderiya	C1-3 Time Trial				
Jyoti Gaderiya	C1-3 500m Time Trial				
Jyoti Gaderiya	C1-3 3000m Individual Pursuit				
Geeta Shambhusingh Rao	C4-5 500m Time Trial				
Geeta Shambhusingh Rao	C4-5 3000m Individual Pursuit				

==== Road ====
Athlete	Event	Final	
Athlete	Event	Timing	Rank
Jyoti Radheshyam Gaderia	C1-5 Road Race		

== Football 5-a-side ==
Team	Event	Group stage						Final / BM	
Team	Event	Opposition Score	Opposition Score	Opposition Score	Opposition Score	Opposition Score	Rank	Opposition Score	Rank
India men's	Men's tournament	China; L 0-4	Malaysia; W 1-0	Iran; L 0-3	Japan; L 0-1	Thailand; L 0-3	5	Did not advance	5

Team

1. Klingson Marak
2. Pradeep Patel
3. Sahil
4. Shivam Singh Negi
5. Sovendra Singh
6. Vishnu Vaghela
7. Akash Singh
8. Chaudhary Prakash

Group stage

Team	Pld	W	D	L	GF	GA	GD	Pts	Qualification
Iran	5	4	1	0	8	0	+8	13	Gold medal match
China	5	4	0	1	10	1	+9	12	Gold medal match
Japan	5	2	2	1	4	2	+2	8	Bronze medal match
Thailand	5	2	1	2	7	4	+3	7	Bronze medal match
India	5	1	0	4	1	11	−10	3	
Malaysia	5	0	0	5	0	12	−12	0	

Source: HAPGOC

== Judo ==
=== Men ===
Athlete	Class	Event	Round of 16	Quarterfinal	Semifinal	Repechage	Final / BM	
Athlete	Class	Event	Opposition Result	Opposition Result	Opposition Result	Opposition Result	Opposition Result	Rank
Kapil Kumar	J1	60 kg						
Devendra Yasav	J1	90 kg						
Jaydev Gorain	J1	+90 kg						
Sunil Kumar	J2	-90 kg						

=== Women ===
Athlete	Class	Event	Round of 16	Quarterfinal	Semifinal	Repechage	Final / BM	
Athlete	Class	Event	Opposition Result	Opposition Result	Opposition Result	Opposition Result	Opposition Result	Rank
Janki Bai	J1	48 kg						
Renuka Salave	J1	70 kg						
Mukesh Rani	J1	+70 kg						
Kokila Kaushiklate	J2	48 kg						
Gulshan	J2	57 kg						
Vrushali More	J2	70						

== Lawn bowls ==
Men

Athlete	Event	Group stage					Quarterfinals	Semifinals	Final	
Athlete	Event	Opposition Score	Opposition Score	Opposition Score	Opposition Score	Rank	Opposition Score	Opposition Score	Opposition Score	Rank
Murthy Balaji Krishna	Singles B6									
Raghvendra Puttaswamamiah	Singles B6									
Devendra Kumar	Singles B7									
Vikas Narwal	Singles B7									
Vikas Dagar	Singles B8									
Sujit Singh	Singles B8									

Women

Athlete	Event	Group stage					Quarterfinals	Semifinals	Final	
Athlete	Event	Opposition Score	Opposition Score	Opposition Score	Opposition Score	Rank	Opposition Score	Opposition Score	Opposition Score	Rank
Anju Bala	Singles B6									
Nirmala Devi	Singles B6									
Nilima Ray	Singles B7									
Rinki	Singles B7									
Bharti Rathee	Singles B8									
Sapana	Singles B8									

Mixed

Athlete	Event	Group stage					Quarterfinals	Semifinals	Final	
Athlete	Event	Opposition Score	Opposition Score	Opposition Score	Opposition Score	Rank	Opposition Score	Opposition Score	Opposition Score	Rank
Murthy Balaji Krishna; Nirmala Devi	Pairs B6									
Raghvendra Puttaswamamiah; Anju Bala	Pairs B6									
Devendra Kumar; Nilima Ray	Pairs B7									
Vikas Narwal; Rinki	Pairs B7									
Vikas Dagar; Bharti Rathee	Pairs B8									
Sujit Singh; Sapana	Pairs B8									

== Powerlifting ==
=== Men ===
Athlete	Event	Attempt 1	Attempt 2	Attempt 3	Total	Rank
Paramjeet Kumar	49 kg				160	4
Manish Kumar	54 kg				160	6
Ashok Malik	65 kg				192	3rd place, bronze medalist(s)
Ramubhai Rambhava	72 kg					
Sandesha Giddegowda	80 kg					
Pradeep Joon	+107 kg					

=== Women ===
Athlete	Event	Attempt 1	Attempt 2	Attempt 3	Total	Rank
Manpreet Kaur	41 kg				75	5
Jaspreet Kaur	45 kg	DSQ				
Sakina Khatun	50 kg				—N/a	—N/a
Pratima Krishnarao	50 kg					
Suman Devi	55 kg				88	6
Seema Rani	55 kg				90	5
Raj Kumari	61 kg				84	3rd place, bronze medalist(s)
Zainab Khatoon	61 kg				85	2nd place, silver medalist(s)
Kasthuri Rajmani	67 kg					

== Rowing ==
Athlete	Event	Heats		Semifinal		Final	
Athlete	Event	Time	Rank	Time	Rank	Time	Rank
Narayana Konganapalle; Anita	PR3 Mixed Double Sculls						

== Shooting ==
=== Men ===
Athlete	Event	Qualification		Final	
Athlete	Event	Score	Rank	Score	Rank
Swaroop Mahavir Unhalkar	R1 - 10m Air Rifle Standing SH1	614.0	5Q	160.8	6
Akash	P1 - 10m Air Pistol SH1	565	6Q	112.3	8
Rudransh Khandelwal	P1 - 10m Air Pistol SH1	567	5Q	238.3	2nd place, silver medalist(s)
Manish Narwal	P1 - 10m Air Pistol SH1	573	2Q	217.3	3rd place, bronze medalist(s)
Singhraj Adhana	P1 - 10m Air Pistol SH1	559	9	did not advance	

=== Women ===
Athlete	Event	Qualification		Final	
Athlete	Event	Score	Rank	Score	Rank
Mona Agarwal	R2 - 10m Air Rifle Standing SH1	617.8	8Q	162.7	6
Avani Lekhara	R2 - 10m Air Rifle Standing SH1	626.6	2Q	249.6	1st place, gold medalist(s)
Avani Lekhara	R8 - 50m Rifle 3 Positions SH1				
Rubina Francis	P2 - 10m Air Pistol SH1	559	7Q	211	3rd place, bronze medalist(s)
Nisha Kanwar	P2 - 10m Air Pistol SH1	545	10	did not advance	
Sumedha Pathak	P2 - 10m Air Pistol SH1	551	8Q	129.4	7

=== Mixed ===
Athlete	Event	Qualification		Final	
Athlete	Event	Score	Rank	Score	Rank
Avani Lekhara	R3 - 10m Air Rifle Prone SH1	632.9	5Q	208.1	4
Mona Agarwal	R3 - 10m Air Rifle Prone SH1	624	20	did not advance	
Swaroop Mahavir Unhalkar	R3 - 10m Air Rifle Prone SH1	622.4	22	did not advance	
Sidhartha Babu	R3 - 10m Air Rifle Prone SH1	629.4	11	did not advance	
Ramakrishna Sriharsha Devaraddi	R4 - 10m Air Rifle Standing SH2	630.2	4Q	145	7
Ramakrishna Sriharsha Devaraddi	R5 - 10m Air Rifle Prone SH2	632.5	6Q	115.6	8
Avani Lekhara	R6 - 50m Rifle Prone SH1	615.0	8Q	119.6	8
Swaroop Mahavir Unhalkar	R6 - 50m Rifle Prone SH1	603.2	18	did not advance	
Siddhartha Basu	R6 - 50m Rifle Prone SH1	620.3	3Q	247.7APGR	1st place, gold medalist(s)
Amir Ahmad	P3 - 25m Pistol SH1	571	2Q	7	7
Nihal Bhat	P3 - 25m Pistol SH1	566	7Q	18	4
Rahul Jakhar	P3 - 25m Pistol SH1	570	3Q	5	8
Rahul Jakhar	P4 - 50m Pistol SH1	525	10	did not advance	
Akash	P4 - 50m Pistol SH1	517	11	did not advance	
Rudransh Khandelwal	P4 - 50m Pistol SH1	538	3Q	218.9	2nd place, silver medalist(s)
Singhraj Adhana	P4 - 50m Pistol SH1	516	12	did not advance	

== Swimming ==
Athlete	Event	Class	Heat		Final	
Athlete	Event	Class	Time	Rank	Time	Rank
Mohammad Shams Aalam Shaikh	50m Freestyle	S5	55.22	8	Did not advance	
Suyash Jadhav	50m Freestyle	S7				
Niranjan Mukundan	50m Freestyle	S7				
Tejas Nandkumar	50m Freestyle	S7				
Swapnil Patil	50m Freestyle	S10	27.92	3 Q	27.70	7
Himanshu Nandal	50m Freestyle	S11	31.08	5	Did not advance	
Shridhar Nagappa Malagi	100m Freestyle	S8				
Swapnil Patil	100m Freestyle	S10	1:02.65	3Q	1:02.30	6
Gopichand Lingutla	400m Freestyle	S7	5:49.43	2Q	5:47.47	6
Niranjan Mukundan	400m Freestyle	S7	5:26.43	2Q	5:16.85	4
Tejas Nandkumar	400m Freestyle	S7	5:49.67	3Q	5:50.57	8
Shridhar Nagappa Malagi	400m Freestyle	S8	—N/a	—N/a	5:11.41	5
Punith Nandkumar	400m Freestyle	S8	—N/a	—N/a	5:53.05	7
Himanshu Nandal	400m Freestyle	S11	5:33.04	2Q	5:28.71	4
Suyash Jadhav	100m Backstroke	S7				
Gopichand Lingutla	100m Backstroke	S7				
Tejas Nandkumar	100m Backstroke	S7				
Punith Nandkumar	100m Backstroke	S8	1:31.83	5	Did not advance	
Swapnil Patil	100m Backstroke	S10				
Himanshu Nandal	100m Backstroke	S11	1:17.96	3Q		
Herojit Singh Rajkumar	100m Breaststroke	SB4	—N/a	—N/a	2:24.49	5
Mohammad Shams Aalam Shaikh	100m Breaststroke	SB4	—N/a	—N/a	2:24.05	4
Anowar Sikdar	100m Breaststroke	SB8				
Himanshu Nandal	100m Breaststroke	SB11	—N/a	—N/a	1:32.05	6
Mohammad Shams Aalam Shaikh	50m Butterfly	S5	58.62	6	Did not advance	
Suyash Jadhav						
Niranjan Mukundan						

Athlete	Event	Class	Heat		Final	
Athlete	Event	Class	Time	Rank	Time	Rank
Mohammad Shams Aalam Shaikh	50m Freestyle	S5				

== Taekwondo ==
=== Men ===
Athlete	Event	Round of 16	Quarterfinal	Semifinal	Final / BM	
Athlete	Event	Opposition Result	Opposition Result	Opposition Result	Opposition Result	Rank
Mohit Singh	K44 -58kg					
Ranjan Kumar	K44 -63kg					

=== Women ===
Athlete	Event	Round of 16	Quarterfinal	Semifinal	Final / BM	
Athlete	Event	Opposition Result	Opposition Result	Opposition Result	Opposition Result	Rank
Aruna Tanwar	K44 -47kg					
Muskan	K44 -52kg					
Veena Arora	K44 -52kg					

== Table Tennis ==
=== Men ===
Athlete	Event	Group stage					Quarterfinal	Semifinal	Final	
Athlete	Event	Opposition Score	Opposition Score	Opposition Score	Opposition Score	Rank	Opposition Score	Opposition Score	Opposition Score	Rank
Sandeep Dangi	Singles Class 1	Madan (IND); Won 3-2	Nam (KOR); Lost 0-3	Joo (KOR); Lost 0-3	Ibrahim (KUW); Won 3-0	3Q	—N/a			3rd place, bronze medalist(s)
Jehan Dorab Madan	Singles Class 1	Dangi (IND); Lost 2-3	Ibrahim (KUW); Won 3-1	Nam (KOR); Lost 0-3	Joo (KOR); Lost 0-3	4	—N/a			4
Jashvant Chaudhary	Singles Class 4	Kim (KOR); Lost 1-3	Lin (TPE); Lost 0-3	—N/a		3	Did not advance to next round			
Raj Alagar	Singles Class 5	Cao (CHN); Lost 0-3	Chanpahaka (THA); Lost 0-3	—N/a		3	Did not advance to next round			
Dattaprasad Chougule	Singles Class 9	Fan (CHN); Lost 0-3	Sultan (PHI); Won 3-0	Chee (MAS); Lost 0-3	—N/a	3	Did not advance to next round			
Hitesh Dolwani	Singles Class 10	Su (TPE); Lost 0-3	Mondal (BAN); Won 3-0	Akbar (INA); Lost 0-3	—N/a	3	Did not advance to next round			
Sandeep Dangi / Jehan Dorab Madan	Doubles Class 4	Joo / Jang (KOR); Lost 0-3	Janfeshan / Reza (IRI); Lost 0-3	—N/a		3	Did not advance to next round			

=== Women ===
Athlete	Event	Group stage				Quarterfinal	Semifinal	Final	
Athlete	Event	Opposition Score	Opposition Score	Opposition Score	Rank	Opposition Score	Opposition Score	Opposition Score	Rank
Sonalben Patel	Singles Class 3	Xue (CHN); Lost 0-3	Pattaravadee (THA); Lost 2-3	Lee (KOR); Lost 1-3	4	Did not advance to next round			
Bhavina Patel	Singles Class 4	Stepanova (KAZ); Won 3-0	Shin (KOR); Won 3-1	—N/a	1Q	Tarsilem (INA); Won 3-0	Gu (CHN); Lost 1-3	Did not advance	3rd place, bronze medalist(s)
Poonam	Singles Class 6	Jin (CHN); Lost 0-3	Pascoela (TLS); Lost 2-3	Farttoosi (IRQ); Lost 0-3	4	Did not advance to next round			
Pragati Kesharwani	Singles Class 8	Huang (CHN); Lost 0-3	Hamida (INA); Lost 0-3	—N/a	3	Did not advance to next round			
Baby Sahana Ravi	Singles Class 9	Liu (CHN); Lost 0-3	Baduova (KAZ); Won 3-0	—N/a	2Q	Xiong (CHN); Lost 0-3	Did not advance to next round		
Sonal Patel; Bhavina Patel	Doubles Class 10	—N/a				Zhou / Zhang (CHN); Lost 0-3	Did not advance to next round		
Poonam; Pragati Kesharwani	Doubles Class 14	Wong / Chiu (HKG); Lost 0-3	Al-Dayyeni / Farttoosi (IRQ); Lost 0-3	Huang / Jin (CHN); Lost 0-3	4	Did not advance to next round			

=== Mixed ===
Athlete	Event	Group stage				Round of 32	Round of 16	Quarterfinal	Semifinal	Final	
Athlete	Event	Opposition Score	Opposition Score	Opposition Score	Rank	Opposition Score	Opposition Score	Opposition Score	Opposition Score	Opposition Score	Rank
Jehan Dorab Madan / Sonalben Patel	Doubles Class 4	Park / Seo (KOR); Lost 0-3	Gao / Liu (CHN); Lost 0-3	—N/a	3	Did not advance to next round					
Bhavina Patel / Jashvant Chaudhary	Doubles Class 7-10	—N/a					Hardiyanto / Marlina (CHN); Lost 0-3	Did not advance to next round			
Dattaprasad Chougule / Pragati Kesharwani	Doubles Class 17-20	—N/a					Prahasta / Resti (INA); Lost 0-3	Did not advance to next round			
Baby Sahana Ravi; Hitesh Dolwani	Doubles Class 17-20	—N/a				Zhao S / Zhao X (CHN); Lost 0-3	Did not advance to next round				

== Wheelchair Fencing ==
=== Men ===
Athlete	Event	Group stage							Round of 32	Round of 16	Quarterfinal	Semifinal	Final / BM	
Athlete	Event	Opposition Score	Opposition Score	Opposition Score	Opposition Score	Opposition Score	Opposition Score	Rank	Opposition Score	Opposition Score	Opposition Score	Opposition Score	Opposition Score	Rank
Praveen	Foil - Category A													
Venkateshar Ramesh Rao	Foil - Category A													
Rakhal Sethy	Foil - Category A													
Sunil Phogat	Foil - Category B													
Venkateshar Ramesh Rao	Épée - Category A													
Rakhal Sethy	Épée - Category A													
Rakhal Sethy	Sabre - Category A													
Sunil Phogat	Sabre - Category B													
Prafulla Kumar Khandayatray	Sabre - Category B													
Sunil Phogat Venkateshar Ramesh Rao Rakhal SethyPraveen	Foil Team													
Prafulla Kumar Khandayatray Venkateshar Ramesh Rao Rakhal SethyPraveen	Sabre Team													

=== Women ===
Athlete	Event	Group stage							Round of 32	Round of 16	Quarterfinal	Semifinal	Final / BM	
Athlete	Event	Opposition Score	Opposition Score	Opposition Score	Opposition Score	Opposition Score	Opposition Score	Rank	Opposition Score	Opposition Score	Opposition Score	Opposition Score	Opposition Score	Rank
Rekha Devi	Foil - Category B													
Rekha	Épée - Category A													
Pujaswini Nayak	Épée - Category B													
Anuradha Pandhari Solanki	Sabre - Category A													
Sheranthi Thomas	Sabre - Category B													
Rekha Rekha Devi Anuradha Pandhari Solanki Pujaswini Nayak	Foil Team													

== See also ==
- India at the 2022 Asian Games
- India at the Asian Games
