= Badminton at the 2022 Asian Para Games – Men's doubles SU5 =

Badminton tournament

Badminton's men's doubles SU5 at the 2022 Asian Para Games
- Venue: Binjiang Gymnasium, Hangzhou
- Dates: 21 – 27 August 2023
- Competitors: 26 from 10 nations

Medalists
gold medal	Dheva Anrimusthi; Hafizh Briliansyah	Indonesia
silver medal	Chirag Baretha; Raj Kumar	India
bronze medal	Fang Jen-yu; Pu Gui-yu	Chinese Taipei
bronze medal	Muhammad Fareez Anuar; Cheak Liek Hou	Malaysia

The men's doubles SU5 badminton tournament at the 2022 Asian Para Games is playing from 21 to 27 October 2023 in Binjiang Gymnasium, Hangzhou. A total of 13 pairs competed at the tournament, four of whom was seeded.

== Competition schedule ==
Plays are taking place between 21 and 27 October 2023.

GS	Group stage	¼	Quarterfinals	½	Semifinals	F	Final

Events	Fri 20	Sat 21	Sun 22	Mon 23	Tue 24	Wed 25	Thu 26	Fri 27
Men's doubles SU5		GS		GS	GS	¼	½	F

== Seeds ==
The following players were seeded:

1. Chirag Baretha / Raj Kumar (IND) (final; silver medalists)
2. Muhammad Fareez Anuar / Cheah Liek Hou (MAS) (semi-finals; bronze medalists)
3. Hardik Makkar / Ruthick Ragupathi (IND) (group stage)
4. Dheva Anrimusthi / Hafizh Briliansyah (INA) (champion; gold medalists)

== Group stage ==
=== Group A ===
Pos	Team	Pld	W	L	GF	GA	GD	PF	PA	PD	Qualification
1	Chirag Baretha (IND) Raj Kumar (IND) [1]	2	2	0	4	0	+4	84	57	+27	Qualification to elimination stage
2	Mohamad Faris Ahmad Azri (MAS) Amyrul Yazid Ahmad Sibi (MAS)	2	1	1	2	2	0	69	72	−3	Qualification to elimination stage
3	Ang Chee Hiong (SGP) Tay Wei Ming (SGP)	2	0	2	0	4	−4	60	84	−24	

Source: Group A – standings

Date		Score		Game 1	Game 2	Game 3
21 Oct	Mohamad Faris Ahmad Azri (Malaysia); Amyrul Yazid Ahmad Sibi (Malaysia)	2–0	(Singapore) Ang Chee Hiong (Singapore) Tay Wei Ming	21–15	21–15	
23 Oct	Chirag Baretha (India); Raj Kumar (India)	2–0	(Malaysia) Mohamad Faris Ahmad Azri (Malaysia) Amyrul Yazid Ahmad Sibi	21–17	21–10	
24 Oct	Chirag Baretha (India); Raj Kumar (India)	2–0	(Singapore) Ang Chee Hiong (Singapore) Tay Wei Ming	21–15	21–15	

=== Group B ===
Pos	Team	Pld	W	L	GF	GA	GD	PF	PA	PD	Qualification
1	Muhammad Fareez Anuar (MAS) Cheak Liek Hou (MAS) [2]	2	2	0	4	0	+4	0	0	0	Qualification to elimination stage
2	Li Mingpan (CHN) Shi Shengzhuo (CHN) (H)	2	1	1	2	2	0	42	13	+29	Qualification to elimination stage
3	Adhikari Prakash (NEP) Hem Gurung (NEP)	2	0	2	0	4	−4	13	42	−29	

Source: Group B – standings
(H) Host

Date		Score		Game 1	Game 2	Game 3
21 Oct	Li Mingpan (China); Shi Shengzhuo (China)	2–0	(Nepal) Adhikari Prakash (Nepal) Hem Gurung	21–8	21–5	
23 Oct	Muhammad Fareez Anuar (Malaysia); Cheak Liek Hou (Malaysia)	2–0	(China) Li Mingpan (China) Shi Shengzhuo	21–17	21–19	
24 Oct	Muhammad Fareez Anuar (Malaysia); Cheak Liek Hou (Malaysia)	2–0	(Nepal) Adhikari Prakash (Nepal) Hem Gurung	21–6	21–8	

=== Group C ===
Pos	Team	Pld	W	L	GF	GA	GD	PF	PA	PD	Qualification
1	Fang Jen-yu (TPE) Pu Gui-yu (TPE)	2	2	0	4	1	+3	101	77	+24	Qualification to elimination stage
2	Suryo Nugroho (INA) Oddie Listiant (INA)	2	1	1	3	2	+1	86	84	+2	Qualification to elimination stage
3	Hardik Makkar (IND) Ruthick Ragupathi (IND) [3/4]	2	0	2	0	4	−4	58	84	−26	

Source: Group C – standings

Date		Score		Game 1	Game 2	Game 3
21 Oct	Suryo Nugroho (Indonesia); Oddie Listiant (Indonesia)	1–2	(Chinese Taipei) Fang Jen-yu (Chinese Taipei) Pu Gui-yu	21–17	9–21	14–21
23 Oct	Hardik Makkar (India); Ruthick Ragupathi (India)	0–2	(Indonesia) Suryo Nugroho (Indonesia) Oddie Listiant	9–21	16–21	
24 Oct	Hardik Makkar (India); Ruthick Ragupathi (India)	0–2	(Chinese Taipei) Fang Jen-yu (Chinese Taipei) Pu Gui-yu	19–21	14–21	

=== Group D ===
Pos	Team	Pld	W	L	GF	GA	GD	PF	PA	PD	Qualification
1	Dheva Anrimusthi (INA) Hafizh Briliansyah (INA) [3/4]	3	3	0	6	0	+6	126	74	+52	Qualification to elimination stage
2	Bùi Minh Hải (VIE) Phạm Văn Tới (VIE)	3	2	1	4	4	0	132	144	−12	Qualification to elimination stage
3	Pricha Somsiri (THA) Nattaphon Thaweesap (THA)	3	1	2	3	4	−1	121	131	−10	
4	Jeon Sun-woo (KOR) Kim Gi-yeon (KOR)	3	0	3	1	6	−5	109	139	−30	

Source: Group D – standings

Date		Score		Game 1	Game 2	Game 3
21 Oct	Dheva Anrimusthi (Indonesia); Hafizh Briliansyah (Indonesia)	2–0	(Vietnam) Bùi Minh Hải (Vietnam) Phạm Văn Tới	21–6	21–14	
21 Oct	Pricha Somsiri (Thailand); Nattaphon Thaweesap (Thailand)	2–0	(South Korea) Jeon Sun-woo (South Korea) Kim Gi-yeon	21–17	21–15	
23 Oct	Dheva Anrimusthi (Indonesia); Hafizh Briliansyah (Indonesia)	2–0	(Thailand) Pricha Somsiri (Thailand) Nattaphon Thaweesap	21–12	21–15	
23 Oct	Jeon Sun-woo (South Korea); Kim Gi-yeon (South Korea)	1–2	(Vietnam) Bùi Minh Hải (Vietnam) Phạm Văn Tới	18–21	21–13	11–21
24 Oct	Dheva Anrimusthi (Indonesia); Hafizh Briliansyah (Indonesia)	2–0	(South Korea) Jeon Sun-woo (South Korea) Kim Gi-yeon	21–15	21–12	
24 Oct	Pricha Somsiri (Thailand); Nattaphon Thaweesap (Thailand)	1–2	(Vietnam) Bùi Minh Hải (Vietnam) Phạm Văn Tới	21–15	15–21	16–21

== Elimination round ==
Top two ranked in each group qualified to the elimination round, the draw will be decided after the previous round finished.

Quarter-finals
1	Chirag Baretha (IND); Raj Kumar (IND)	16	21	21
Bùi Minh Hải (VIE); Phạm Văn Tới (VIE)	21	17	15
Fang Jen-yu (TPE); Pu Gui-yu (TPE)	21	18	21
Mohamad Faris Ahmad Azri (MAS); Amyrul Yazid Ahmad Sibi (MAS)	18	21	18
Li Mingpan (CHN); Shi Shengzhuo (CHN)	8	13
3/4	Dheva Anrimusthi (INA); Hafizh Briliansyah (INA)	21	21
Suryo Nugroho (INA); Oddie Listiant (INA)	15	13
2	Muhammad Fareez Anuar (MAS); Cheak Liek Hou (MAS)	21	21

Semi-finals
1	Chirag Baretha (IND); Raj Kumar (IND)	21	16	21
Fang Jen-yu (TPE); Pu Gui-yu (TPE)	15	21	9
3/4	Dheva Anrimusthi (INA); Hafizh Briliansyah (INA)	19	21	21
2	Muhammad Fareez Anuar (MAS); Cheak Liek Hou (MAS)	21	15	12

Final
1	Chirag Baretha (IND); Raj Kumar (IND)	11	21	11
3/4	Dheva Anrimusthi (INA); Hafizh Briliansyah (INA)	21	19	21
