= Himanshi =

Himanshi is a given name. Notable people with the name include:

- Himanshi Khurana, Indian model, actress and singer
- Himanshi Choudhry, British actress
- Himanshi Rathi, Indian para chess player
- Himanshi Shelat (Born: 1947), Indian Gujarati-language author
- Himanshi Parashar, Indian television series
- Himanshi Gawande, Field hockey franchise team in India
