= Pradeep Kumar (javelin thrower) =

Indian para javelin thrower

Pradeep Kumar (born 1981) is an Indian para athlete who competes in the men's javelin throw F53/54 events. He represented India in the 2026 Asian Para Games at Aichi Nagoya, Japan, and won a silver medal in the javelin throw event.

Kumar achieved a personal best throw of 27.45 metres and won a silver with 901 Raza points at the Asian Games on 20 October 2026. It was his second successive silver medal at the Asian Games. In 2023, he represented India at the 2022 Asian Para Games and won a silver with a 5.94-meter throw in the men's javelin F54 event.
