= Football 5-a-side at the 2022 Asian Para Games =

- Venue: Gongshu Canal Sports Park Field Hockey Field
- Location: Hangzhou, Zhejiang, China
- Dates: 23–28 October 2023
- Nations: 6

Medalists
gold medal	China
silver medal	Iran
bronze medal	Thailand

5-a-side football or blind football was one of the events featured at the 2022 Asian Para Games, which took place at the Gongshu Canal Sports Park Field Hockey Field in Hangzhou, Zhejiang, China, from 23 to 28 October 2023. Six teams entered.

== Results ==
=== Group stage ===
Team	Pld	W	D	L	GF	GA	GD	Pts	Qualification
Iran	5	4	1	0	8	0	+8	13	Gold medal match
China	5	4	0	1	10	1	+9	12	Gold medal match
Japan	5	2	2	1	4	2	+2	8	Bronze medal match
Thailand	5	2	1	2	7	4	+3	7	Bronze medal match
India	5	1	0	4	1	11	−10	3	
Malaysia	5	0	0	5	0	12	−12	0	

Source: HAPGOC
23 October 2023
10:00 UTC+8

China	4–0	India
Zhang Jaibin; Zhu Ruiming; Tang Zhihua; Lu Haifu	Report

Gongshu Canal Sports Park Field Hockey Field, Hangzhou
23 October 2023
12:00 UTC+8

Iran	0–0	Japan
	Report

Gongshu Canal Sports Park Field Hockey Field, Hangzhou
23 October 2023
14:00 UTC+8

Thailand	3–0	Malaysia
Kupan Panyawat; Baodee Kittikom	Report

Gongshu Canal Sports Park Field Hockey Field, Hangzhou

24 October 2023
10:00 UTC+8

China	1–0	Japan
Yu Yutan	Report

Gongshu Canal Sports Park Field Hockey Field, Hangzhou
24 October 2023
12:00 UTC+8

Iran	2–0	Thailand
Rahimighasr Sadegh	Report

Gongshu Canal Sports Park Field Hockey Field, Hangzhou
24 October 2023
14:00 UTC+8

Malaysia	0–1	India
	Report	Souvendra Singh

Gongshu Canal Sports Park Field Hockey Field, Hangzhou

25 October 2023
10:00 UTC+8

Thailand	1–1	Japan
Kupan Panyawat	Report	Hirabayashi Taichi

Gongshu Canal Sports Park Field Hockey Field, Hangzhou
25 October 2023
12:00 UTC+8

China	4–0	Malaysia
Tang Zhihua; Yu Yutan; Lu Haifu; Xu Guansheng	Report

Gongshu Canal Sports Park Field Hockey Field, Hangzhou
25 October 2023
14:00 UTC+8

Iran	3–0	India
Rajab Pour Hossein; Rahimighasr Sadegh	Report

Gongshu Canal Sports Park Field Hockey Field, Hangzhou

26 October 2023
10:00 UTC+8

China	1–0	Thailand
Zhang Jaibin	Report

Gongshu Canal Sports Park Field Hockey Field, Hangzhou
26 October 2023
12:00 UTC+8

Japan	1–0	India
Vagela Vishnubha Tejubha (o.g.)	Report

Gongshu Canal Sports Park Field Hockey Field, Hangzhou
26 October 2023
14:00 UTC+8

Iran	2–0	Malaysia
Rahimighasr Sadegh; Karimimaleh Morteza	Report

Gongshu Canal Sports Park Field Hockey Field, Hangzhou

27 October 2023
10:00 UTC+8

Thailand	3–0	India
Kupan Panyawat; Baodee Kittikom	Report

Gongshu Canal Sports Park Field Hockey Field, Hangzhou
27 October 2023
12:00 UTC+8

Malaysia	0–2	Japan
	Report	Torii Kento; Hirabayashi Taichi

Gongshu Canal Sports Park Field Hockey Field, Hangzhou
27 October 2023
14:00 UTC+8

China	0–1	Iran
	Report	Rahimighasr Sadegh

Gongshu Canal Sports Park Field Hockey Field, Hangzhou

=== Final round ===
==== Bronze medal match ====
28 October 2023
9:30 UTC+8

Japan	0–0	Thailand
	Report
Penalties
Yuzuki Sonobe (penalty missed); Taichi Hirabayashi (penalty missed); Ryo Kawamura (penalty missed)	0–1	(penalty missed) Panyawut Kupan; (penalty missed) Ronnarod Phuna; (penalty scored) Prakong Buayai

Gongshu Canal Sports Park Field Hockey Field, Hangzhou

==== Gold medal match ====
28 October 2023
11:30 UTC+8

Iran	0–0	China
	Report
Penalties
Sedegh Rahimighasr (penalty missed); Morteza Karimiamaleh (penalty scored); Mohammadamin Rahimzadeharab (penalty missed); Alireza Izadi (penalty missed)	1–2	(penalty scored) Liu Meng; (penalty missed) Tang Zhihua; (penalty missed) Li Haifu; (penalty scored) Zhu Ruiming

Gongshu Canal Sports Park Field Hockey Field, Hangzhou

== Final rankings ==
Pos.	Team	Pld	W	D	L	Pts	GF	GA	GD
Gold medal	China (CHN)	6	4	1	1	13	10	1	+9
Silver medal	Iran (IRI)	6	4	2	0	14	8	0	+8
Bronze medal	Thailand (THA)	6	2	2	2	8	7	4	+3
4	Japan (JPN)	6	2	3	1	9	4	2	+2
Eliminated in the Group Stage
5	India (IND)	5	1	0	4	3	1	11	−10
6	Malaysia (MAS)	5	0	0	5	0	0	12	−12

Source: HAPGOC

== Goalscorers ==
6 goals

- Sadegh Rahimighasr (IRI)

5 goals

- Panyawut Kupan (THA)

2 goals

- Zhang Jiabin (CHN)
- Li Haifu (CHN)
- Tang Zhihua (CHN)
- Yu Yutan (CHN)
- Taichi Hirabayashi (JPN)
- Kittikorn Baodee (THA)

1 goal

- Xu Guansheng (CHN)
- Zhu Ruiming (CHN)
- Morteza Karimiamaleh (IRI)
- Hossein Rajab Pour (IRI)
- Kento Torii (JPN)
- Singh Sovendra (IND)

Source: HAPGOC

== Medalists ==
Event	Gold	Silver	Bronze
Men's team	China (CHN): Wu Limin; Tang Zhihua; Liu Meng; Zhang Jiabin; Yu Yutan; Li Haifu; Xu Guansheng; Zhong Liang; Zhu Ruiming; Xu Huachu	Iran (IRI): Shirkouhi Morteza Ramezani; Mohammadamin Rahimzadeharab; Alireza Bakht; Alireza Izadi; Nashtifani Kambiz Mohkam; Hossein Rajab Pour; Morteza Karimiamaleh; Sadegh Rahimighasr; Ahmadreza Shahhosseiniardekani; Seyedsaeed Mousavipirmoradi	Thailand (THA): Ponchai Kasikonudompaisan; Satayu Wannit; Bancha Munphet; Panyawut Kupan; Somchai Magong; Prakrong Buayai; Ronnarod Phuna; Phichitchai Somboonsak; Kittikorn Baodee; Sanan Phetkrachangsuk

Source: HAPGOC
