= Badminton at the 2022 Asian Para Games – Women's singles WH2 =

Badminton's women's singles WH2 at the 2022 Asian Para Games
- Venue: Binjiang Gymnasium, Hangzhou
- Dates: 20 – 27 August 2023
- Competitors: 10 from 8 nations

Medalists
gold medal	Liu Yutong	China
silver medal	Li Hongyan	China
bronze medal	Jung Gyeoul	South Korea
bronze medal	Amnouy Wetwithan	Thailand

The women's singles WH2 badminton tournament at the 2022 Asian Para Games is playing from 20 to 27 October 2023 in Binjiang Gymnasium, Hangzhou. A total of 10 players competed at the tournament, two of whom was seeded.

== Competition schedule ==
Plays are taking place between 20 and 27 October 2023.

GS	Group stage	¼	Quarterfinals	½	Semifinals	F	Final

Events	Fri 20	Sat 21	Sun 22	Mon 23	Tue 24	Wed 25	Thu 26	Fri 27
Women's singles WH2	GS	GS		GS		¼	½	F

== Seeds ==
The following players were seeded:

1. Yuma Yamazaki (JPN) (quarter-finals)
2. Jung Gyeoul (KOR) (semi-finals; bronze medalist)
3. Lee Sun-ae (KOR) (quarter-finals)

== Group stage ==
=== Group A ===
Pos	Team	Pld	W	L	GF	GA	GD	PF	PA	PD	Qualification
1	Liu Yutong (CHN) (H)	2	2	0	4	0	+4	84	16	+68	Qualification to elimination stage
2	Yuma Yamazaki (JPN) [1]	2	1	1	2	2	0	54	53	+1	Qualification to elimination stage
3	Ammu Mohan (IND)	2	0	2	0	4	−4	15	84	−69	

Source: Group A – standings
(H) Host

Date		Score		Game 1	Game 2	Game 3
20 Oct	Ammu Mohan (India)	0–2	(China) Liu Yutong	2–21	2–21	
21 Oct	Yuma Yamazaki (Japan)	2–0	(India) Ammu Mohan	21–5	21–6	
23 Oct	Yuma Yamazaki (Japan)	0–2	(China) Liu Yutong	6–21	6–21	

=== Group B ===
Pos	Team	Pld	W	L	GF	GA	GD	PF	PA	PD	Qualification
1	Li Hongyan (CHN) (H)	2	2	0	4	0	+4	84	30	+54	Qualification to elimination stage
2	Jung Gyeoul (KOR) [2]	2	1	1	2	2	0	60	69	−9	Qualification to elimination stage
3	Yang I-chen (TPE)	2	0	2	0	4	−4	39	84	−45	

Source: Group B – standings
(H) Host

Date		Score		Game 1	Game 2	Game 3
20 Oct	Li Hongyan (China)	2–0	(Chinese Taipei) Yang I-chen	21–4	21–8	
21 Oct	Jung Gyeoul (South Korea)	0–2	(China) Li Hongyan	9–21	9–21	
23 Oct	Jung Gyeoul (South Korea)	2–0	(Chinese Taipei) Yang I-chen	21–8	21–19	

=== Group C ===
Pos	Team	Pld	W	L	GF	GA	GD	PF	PA	PD	Qualification
1	Amnouy Wetwithan (THA)	3	3	0	6	0	+6	126	56	+70	Qualification to elimination stage
2	Lee Sun-ae (KOR) [3]	3	2	1	4	2	+2	113	73	+40	Qualification to elimination stage
3	Hoàng Thị Hồng Thảo (VIE)	3	1	2	2	4	−2	77	101	−24	
4	Paz Lita (PHI)	3	0	3	0	6	−6	40	126	−86	

Source: Group C – standings

Date		Score		Game 1	Game 2	Game 3
20 Oct	Lee Sun-ae (South Korea)	0–2	(Vietnam) Hoàng Thị Hồng Thảo	17–21	12–21	
20 Oct	Paz Lita (Philippines)	0–2	(Thailand) Amnouy Wetwithan	10–21	7–21	
21 Oct	Lee Sun-ae (South Korea)	2–0	(Philippines) Paz Lita	21–4	21–7	
21 Oct	Hoàng Thị Hồng Thảo (Vietnam)	0–2	(Thailand) Amnouy Wetwithan	5–21	10–21	
23 Oct	Lee Sun-ae (South Korea)	2–0	(Vietnam) Hoàng Thị Hồng Thảo	21–9	21–11	
23 Oct	Paz Lita (Philippines)	0–2	(Thailand) Amnouy Wetwithan	5–21	7–21	

== Elimination round ==
Top two ranked in each group qualified to the elimination round, the draw was decided after the previous round finished.

Quarter-finals
2	Jung Gyeoul (KOR)	21	21
3	Lee Sun-ae (KOR)	17	10
1	Yuma Yamazaki (JPN)	20	18
Amnouy Wetwithan (THA)	22	21

Semi-finals
Liu Yutong (CHN)	21	21
2	Jung Gyeoul (KOR)	7	6
Amnouy Wetwithan (THA)	12	15
Li Hongyan (CHN)	21	21

Final
Liu Yutong (CHN)	21	21
Li Hongyan (CHN)	8	10
