= Lalitha Killaka =

Indian para athlete

Personal information
- Born: Vizianagaram, India

Sport
- Sport: Paralympic athletics
Medal record
Women's para-athletics
Representing India
Asian Para Games
Silver medal – second place	2022 Hangzhou	1500m T11

Lalitha Killaka is a para athlete from Andhra Pradesh. She won a gold and a silver at the World Para Athletics Championships in March 2024. Earlier in October 2023, she won a silver medal at the 2022 Asian Para Games.

== Early life and education ==
Killaka is a visually challenged tribal girl from Gummalakshmipuram in Vizianagaram district, Andhra Pradesh. She did her schooling at Netra Vidyalaya run by Chinna Jeer Swami and passed Class X in 2020. She is currently studying 2nd year degree in Netra Vidyalaya college. She is trained by coach Rahul Balakrishna. Tabares Khan is her guide runner. Her father K. Borja and mother Chitamma are farm labourers. She is one of the four siblings. Her school awarded her a cash prize of Rs.3,00,000 and Rs.50,000 for her guide runner.

== Career ==
She was part of the Indian team at the 2022 Asian Para Games at Hangzhou, China. She won a silver medal finishing second behind Rakshitha Raju in the women 1500m T11 on 25 October 2023.

In May 2023, she won a silver at the 5th Indian Open Para Athletics International Championship at Shree Kanteerava Stadium in Bengaluru.
