= Zainab Khatoon =

Indian para powerlifter

Zainab Khatoon (born 1997) is an Indian para-power lifter from Uttar Pradesh. She was part of the Indian para team and won a silver medal at the 2022 Asian Para Games at Hangzhou, China in the women's 61 kg power lifting events. Prime Minister Narendra Modi congratulated her on winning the silver medal and also tweeted it, like he did for all Asiad medal winners.

== Early life ==
Khatoon hails from Sahu Nagla, in Meerut, Uttar Pradesh. She is the daughter of a Meerut-based mason, Mohammed Adil. When she was six, she suffered partial paralysis after she was administered an injection, and she could not walk thereafter. But her father supported her and she completed her Bachelor of Arts degree. She underwent six operations in Delhi and Rajasthan but had to put up with her loss. On the suggestion of her class teacher in school, she took up power-lifting. For two years she walked to the bus stop on her crutches and took a bus to the Kailash Prakash Stadium, where she practiced and finally her hard work paid off when she was selected to represent India. She trained under coach Tanvir Logani before the Asian Para Games.

== Career ==
On 25 October 2023, she won a silver medal at the 2022 Asian Para Games in the 61 kg power lifting event. In 2022 she won a bronze medal at the Fazza Championships in Dubai that booked her a place in the Asian Powerlifting Championships. In the same year, she bagged a 7th place in the World Championship also in Dubai. Earlier in 2021, she won gold medal in both the state and National Powerlifting Championship.
