= Malaysia at the 2022 Asian Para Games =

- IPC code: MAS
- NPC: Paralympic Council Malaysia

in Hangzhou, China 22-28 October 2023
- Competitors: 98 Athletes in 14 sports
- Flag bearers: Muhammad Ikhwan Ramli; Nani Shahiera Zawawi
- Medals Ranked 12th: Gold 7 Silver 15 Bronze 17 Total 39

Asian Para Games appearances (overview)
- 2010; 2014; 2018; 2022

Malaysia competed at the 2022 Asian Para Games in Hangzhou, China from 22 to 28 October 2023. Originally scheduled to take place from 9 to 15 October 2022, the event was postponed to 2023 on 17 May 2022 due to the COVID-19 pandemic.

== Competitors ==
The following is a list of the number of competitors representing Malaysia that will participate at the Asian Para Games:

Sport	Men	Women	Total
Archery	4	1	5
Athletics	13	3	16
Badminton	7	0	7
Boccia	2	2	4
Cycling	7	2	9
Football 5-a-side	10	0	10
Lawn bowls	5	5	10
Powerlifting	5	0	5
Shooting	1	0	1
Swimming	7	2	9
Table tennis	3	1	4
Wheelchair basketball	12	0	12
Wheelchair fencing	2	1	3
Wheelchair tennis	2	1	3
Total	80	18	98

== Medal summary ==
=== Medal by sport ===
Medals by sport
Sport	1st place, gold medalist(s)	2nd place, silver medalist(s)	3rd place, bronze medalist(s)	Total
Athletics	3	2	4	9
Badminton	0	2	2	4
Boccia	1	2	0	3
Cycling	1	6	4	11
Lawn bowls	0	2	2	4
Powerlifting	1	0	1	2
Swimming	1	0	4	5
Wheelchair tennis	0	1	0	1
Total	7	15	17	39

=== Medal by date ===
Medals by date
Day	Date	1st place, gold medalist(s)	2nd place, silver medalist(s)	3rd place, bronze medalist(s)	Total
1	23 October	1	2	3	6
2	24 October	3	4	3	10
3	25 October	3	5	5	13
4	26 October	0	1	2	3
5	27 October	0	3	3	6
6	28 October	0	0	1	1
Total		7	15	17	39

=== Medallists ===
Medal	Name	Sport	Event	Date
Gold	Muhammad Nur Syaiful Zulkafli	Swimming	Men's 100m Breaststroke SB4	23 October
Gold	Nur Suraiya Muhammad Zamri	Cycling	Women's B 1000m Time Trial	24 October
Gold	Muhammad Ziyad Zolkefli	Athletics	Men's Shot Put F20	24 October
Gold	Abdul Latif Romly	Athletics	Men's Long Jump T20	24 October
Gold	Bonnie Bunyau Gustin	Powerlifting	Men's 72kg	25 October
Gold	Muhammad Ammar Aiman Nor Azmi	Athletics	Men's 400m T20	25 October
Gold	Noor Askuzaimey Mat Salim	Boccia	Women's Individual BC4	25 October
Silver	Mohd Khairul Hazwan Wahab	Cycling	Men's B 4000m Individual Pursuit	23 October
Silver	Mohamad Yusof Hafizi Shaharuddin; Muhammad Hafiz Jamali; Zuhairie Ahmad Tarmizi	Cycling	Mixed C1-5 750m Team Sprint	23 October
Silver	Eddy Bernard	Athletics	Men's 100m T44	24 October
Silver	Mohd Khairul Hazwan Wahab	Cycling	Men's B Individual 1000m Time Trial	24 October
Silver	Nur Azlia Syafinaz Mohd Zais	Cycling	Women's B Individual 100m Time Trial	24 October
Silver	Mohamad Aliff Mohamad Awi	Athletics	Men's Shot Put F20	24 October
Silver	Muhammad Adi Raimie Amizazahan	Cycling	Men's C3 3000m Individual Pursuit	25 October
Silver	Muhammad Ayub Bin Mohd	Lawn bowls	Men's Individual B2	25 October
Silver	Lee Chee Hoong	Boccia	Men's Individual BC2	25 October
Silver	Haszely Elias	Lawn bowls	Men's Individual B7	25 October
Silver	Angeline Melissa Lawas	Boccia	Women's Individual BC1	25 October
Silver	Abu Samah Borhan; Mohamad Yusshazwan Yusoff	Wheelchair tennis	Men's Doubles	26 October
Silver	Cheah Liek Hou	Badminton	Men's Singles SU5	27 October
Silver	Mohd Amin Burhanuddin	Badminton	Men's Singles SL4	27 October
Silver	Muhammad Adi Raimie Amizazahan	Cycling	Men's C1-3 Road Race	27 October
Bronze	Zy Kher Lee	Swimming	Men's 100m Breaststroke SB4	23 October
Bronze	Noor Imanina Idris	Athletics	Women's Shot Put F20	23 October
Bronze	Nur Azlia Syafinaz Mohd Zais	Cycling	Women's B 3000m Individual Pursuit	23 October
Bronze	Zulkifly Abdullah	Athletics	Men's Long Jump T20	24 October
Bronze	Zy Kher Lee	Swimming	Men's 200m Freestyle S5	24 October
Bronze	Muhammad Iman Aiman Muhammad Redzuan	Swimming	Men's 100m Backstroke S14	24 October
Bronze	Mohamad Yusof Hafizi Shaharuddin	Cycling	Men's C1 3000m Pursuit	25 October
Bronze	Ahmad Fizzi Rosni	Athletics	Men's 400m T36	25 October
Bronze	Jariah Zakaria	Lawn bowls	Women's Individual B7	25 October
Bronze	Muhammad Nur Syaiful Zulkafli	Swimming	Men's 100m Freestyle S5	25 October
Bronze	Muhammad Ikhwan Ramli	Badminton	Men's Singles WH1	25 October
Bronze	Nur Azlia Syafinaz Mohd Zais	Cycling	Women's B Individual Time Trial	26 October
Bronze	Cheah Liek Hou; Muhammad Fareez Anuar	Badminton	Men's Doubles SU5	26 October
Bronze	Nur Azlia Syafinaz Mohd Zais	Cycling	Women's B Road Race	27 October
Bronze	Nicodemus Manggoi Moses	Powerlifting	Men's - 97 kg	27 October
Bronze	Haszely Elias; Jariah Zakaria	Lawn bowls	Mixed Pairs B7	27 October
Bronze	Muhammad Nurdin Ibrahim	Athletics	Men's 1500m T20	28 October

=== Multiple medalists ===
Name	Medal	Sport	Event
Muhammad Nur Syaiful Zulkafli	Gold; Bronze	Swimming	Men's 100m Breaststroke SB4; Men's 100m Freestyle S5
Muhammad Adi Raimie Amizazahan	Silver; Silver; Silver	Cycling	Mixed C1-5 750m Team Sprint; Men's C3 3000m Individual Pursuit; Men's C1-3 Road Race
Mohd Khairul Hazwan Wahab	Silver; Silver	Cycling	Men's B 4000m Individual Pursuit; Men's B 1000m Individual Time Trial
Nur Azlia Syafinaz Mohd Zais	Silver; Bronze; Bronze; Bronze	Cycling	Women's B 1000m Time Trial; Women's B 3000m Individual Pursuit; Women's B Time Trial; Women's B Road Race
Cheah Liek Hou	Silver; Bronze	Badminton	Men's Singles SU5; Men's Doubles SU5
Mohamad Yusof Hafizi Shaharuddin	Silver; Bronze	Cycling	Mixed C1-5 750m Team Sprint; Men's C1 3000m Individual Pursuit
Haszely Elias	Silver; Bronze	Lawn bowls	Men's Individual B7; Mixed Pairs B7
Jariah Zakaria	Bronze; Bronze	Lawn bowls	Women's Individual B7; Mixed Pairs B7
Zy Kher Lee	Bronze; Bronze	Swimming	Men's 100m Breaststroke SB4; Men's 200m Freestyle S5

== Archery ==
=== Men ===
Athlete	Event	Ranking round		Round of 16	Round of 8	Quarterfinals	Semifinals	Final / BM	
Athlete	Event	Result	Rank	Opposition Result	Opposition Result	Opposition Result	Opposition Result	Opposition Result	Rank
Wiro Julin	Individual compound	659	22	Jang Ho Sik (KOR); W 140–138	Rakesh Kumar (IND); L 138-145	Did not advance			
Daneshen Govinda Rajan	Individual compound	657	23	Sakon Inkaew (THA); L 138-140	Did not advance				
Nurfaizal Hamzah	Individual recurve	524	29	Tseng Lung-hui (TPE); L 4–6	Did not advance				
Suresh Selvathamby	Individual recurve	603	13	Cheng-Ching Hung (TPE); W 6-0	Harvinder Singh (IND); L 2-6	Did not advance			
Wiro Julin; Daneshen Govinda Rajan	Doubles compound	—			Arlan Ateibekov / Alexandr Medvedev (KAZ); L 147-149	Did not advance			
Suresh Selvathamby; Nurfaizal Hamzah	Doubles recurve	—			Tseng Lung-hui / Cheng-Ching Hung (TPE); W 5-4	Gan Jun / Zhao Lixue (CHN); L 2-6	Did not advance		

=== Women ===
Athlete	Event	Ranking round		Round of 16	Round of 8	Quarterfinals	Semifinals	Final / BM	
Athlete	Event	Result	Rank	Opposition Result	Opposition Result	Opposition Result	Opposition Result	Opposition Result	Rank
Nur Jannaton Abdul Jalil	Individual compound	577	23	Praphaporn Homjanthuek (THA); W 129–128	Sarita (IND); L 115-135	Did not advance			

=== Mixed ===
Athlete	Event	Round of 8	Quarterfinals	Semifinals	Final / BM	
Athlete	Event	Opposition Result	Opposition Result	Opposition Result	Opposition Result	Rank
Wiro Julin; Daneshen Govinda Rajan; Nur Jannaton Abdul Jalil	Team compound	Thailand (THA); L 137-142	Did not advance			

== Athletics ==
=== Men ===
==== Track events ====
Athlete	Event	Heats		Final	
Athlete	Event	Result	Rank	Result	Rank
Mohamad Ridzuan Mohamad Puzi	100 m T36	12.17	2 Q	DSQ	
Eddy Bernard	100 m T44	—		11.86	2nd place, silver medalist(s)
Muhammad Ammar Aiman Nor Azmi	400 m T20	48.36	1 Q	47.60 AR GR	1st place, gold medalist(s)
Nasharuddin Mohd	400 m T20	51.68	3 Q	DSQ	
Ahmad Fizzi Rosni	400 m T36	—		57.19	3rd place, bronze medalist(s)
Muhamad Nurdin Ibrahim	1500 m T20	—		4:19.95 SB	3rd place, bronze medalist(s)
Muhammad Faiz Haizat Rosdi	1500 m T38	—		4:41.61	4
Muhammad Ashraf Muhammad Haisham	1500 m T46	—		4:13.76	5

==== Field events ====
Athlete	Event	Final	
Athlete	Event	Result	Rank
Abdul Latif Romly	Long jump T20	7.18	1st place, gold medalist(s)
Zulkifly Abdullah	Long jump T20	6.48	3rd place, bronze medalist(s)
Mohamad Ridzuan Mohamad Puzi	Long jump T36	4.42	6
Eddy Bernard	Long jump T64	6.32	4
Mohamad Aliff Mohamad Awi	Shot put F20	13.75 PB	2nd place, silver medalist(s)
Muhammad Ziyad Zolkefli	Shot put F20	16.65	1st place, gold medalist(s)
Mohammad Zikri Zakaria	Shot put F55	9.88	4

=== Women ===
==== Field events ====
Athlete	Event	Final	
Athlete	Event	Result	Rank
Nani Shahiera Zawawi	Long jump T20	4.90	4
Nur Hidayah Mohd Izaha	Long jump T20	4.73	5
Noor Imanina Idris	Shot put F20	11.08	3rd place, bronze medalist(s)

== Badminton ==
Men

Athlete	Event	Group stage				Round of 16	Quarterfinals	Semifinals	Finals	
Athlete	Event	Opposition Score	Opposition Score	Opposition Score	Rank	Opposition Score	Opposition Score	Opposition Score	Opposition Score	Rank
Muhammad Ikhwan Ramli	Singles WH1	Lee Sam-seop (KOR); W 2–0	Qu Zimo (CHN); L 0–2	—	2 Q	Prem Kumar Ale (IND); W 2–0	Keita Nishimura (JPN); W 2–0	Qu Zimo (CHN); L 0–2	Did not advance	3rd place, bronze medalist(s)
Noor Azwan Noorlan	Singles WH2	Abu Hubaida (IND); W 2–0	Truong Ngoc Binh (VIE); W 2–1	Takumi Matsumoto (JPN); W 2–1	1 Q	Bye	Chan Ho Yuen (HKG); L 0–2	Did not advance		
Mhd Amin Burhanuddin	Singles SL4	Gao Yuyang (CHN); W 2–0	Tarun (IND); W 2–0	—	1 Q	Bye	Yeh En-chuan (TPE); W 2–0	Sukant Kadam (IND); W 2–0	Suhas Lalinakere Yathiraj (IND); L 1–2	2nd place, silver medalist(s)
Cheah Liek Hou	Singles SU5	Shi Shengzhuo (CHN); W 2–0	Antonio Dela Cruz Jr (IND); W 2–0	—	1 Q	Pham Van Toi (VIE); W 2–0	Taiyo Imai (JPN); W 2–1	Fang Jen-yu (TPE); W 2–0	Dheva Anrimusthi (INA); L 1–2	2nd place, silver medalist(s)
Mohamad Faris Ahmad Azri	Singles SU5	Bui Minh Hai (VIE); W 2–0	Taiyo Imai (JPN); L 0–2	Pricha Somsiri (THA); W 2–0	2 Q	Li Mingpan (CHN); L 0–2	Did not advance			
Muhammad Fareez Anuar	Singles SU5	Tay Wei Ming (SGP); W 2–0	Chirag Baretha (IND); W 2–1	—	1 Q	Ruthik Ragupathi (IND); W 2–1	Fang Jen-yu (TPE); L 0–2	Did not advance		
Muhammad Ikhwan Ramli; Noor Azwan Noorlan	Doubles WH1-WH2	Agung Widodo / Supriadi (INA); W 2–0	Yu Sooyoung / Lee Sam-seop (KOR); L 1–2	—	2 Q	—	Qu Zimo / Mai Jianpeng (CHN); L 0–2	Did not advance		
Amyrul Yazid Ahmad Sibi; Mohamad Faris Ahmad Azri	Doubles SU5	Tan Wei Ming / Ang Chee Hiong (SGP); W 2–0	Chirag Baretha / Raj Kumar (IND); L 0–2	—	2 Q	—	Pu Gui-yu / Fang Jen-yu (TPE); L 1–2	Did not advance		
Cheah Liek Hou; Muhammad Fareez Anuar	Doubles SU5	Li Mingpan / Shi Shengzhuo (CHN); W 2–0	Prakash Adhikari / Hem Bahadur Gurung (NEP); W 2–0	—	1 Q	—	Oddie Kurnia Dwi Listyanto / Suryo Nugroho (INA); W 2–0	Hafizh Briliansyah / Dheva Anrimusthi (INA); L 1–2	Did not advance	3rd place, bronze medalist(s)

== Boccia ==
=== Men ===
Athlete	Event	Pool matches				Quarterfinals	Semifinals	Final / BM	
Athlete	Event	Opposition Score	Opposition Score	Opposition Score	Rank	Opposition Score	Opposition Score	Opposition Score	Rank
Iman Haikal Saifulifram	Individual BC1	Lee Chung Ho (KOR); L 2–9	David Gonzaga (PHI); W 6–1	Watcharaphon Vongsa (THA); L 0–10	3	Did not advance			
Lee Chee Hoong	Individual BC1	Irmuun Khurelbaatar (MGL); W 3–2	Felix Ardi Yudha (INA); W 4–2	—	1 Q	Bintang Satria Herlangga (INA); W 5–2	Lee Chung Ho (KOR); W 3–1	Felix Ardi Yudha (INA); L 3–5	2nd place, silver medalist(s)

=== Women ===
Athlete	Event	Pool matches			Play-off	Semifinals	Final / BM	
Athlete	Event	Opposition Score	Opposition Score	Rank	Opposition Score	Opposition Score	Opposition Score	Rank
Angeline Melissa Lawas	Individual BC1	Tsai Yi-ting (TPE); W 8–0	Yuriko Fujii (JPN); W 8–1	1 Q	Jeralyn Tan Yee Ting (SGP); W 3–2	Satanan Phromsiri (THA); W 5–1	Zhang Qi (CHN); L 2–8	2nd place, silver medalist(s)
Noor Askuzaimey Mat Salim	Individual BC4	Yuen Cheung (HKG); L 5–5	Myungsoon Lee (KOR); W 8–0	1 Q	Vivian Lau Wai-yan (HKG); W 6–1	Nuanchan Phonsila (THA); W 4–1	Lin Ximei (CHN); W 3–2	1st place, gold medalist(s)

=== Mixed ===
Athlete	Event	Pool matches				Semifinals	Final / BM	
Athlete	Event	Opposition Score	Opposition Score	Opposition Score	Rank	Opposition Score	Opposition Score	Rank
Angeline Melissa Lawas; Iman Haikal Saifulifram; Lee Chee Hoong	Team BC1/BC2	Japan (JPN); W 14–3	Thailand (THA); L 1–17	China (CHN); L 3–13	3	Did not advance		

== Cycling ==
=== Men ===
==== Road ====
Athlete	Event	Time	Rank
Mohamad Yusof Hafizi Shaharuddin	Road race C1–3	1:31:54	6
Mohamad Yusof Hafizi Shaharuddin	Time trial C1–3	19:47.22	5
Muhammad Adi Raimie Amizazahan	Road race C1–3	1:27:23	2nd place, silver medalist(s)
Muhammad Adi Raimie Amizazahan	Time trial C1–3	20:26.56	7
Zuhairie Ahmad Tarmizi	Road race C4–5	2:00:53	15
Mohd Raffiq Isam	Road race C4–5	2:09:02	18
Mohd Raffiq Isam	Time trial C4–5	30:05.30	12
Ahmad Ahlami Mohammad (Arfy Qhairant – pilot)	Road race B	2:02:18	8
Mohd Khairul Hazwan Wahab (Khairul Adha Rasol – pilot)	Road race B	1:58:02	7

==== Track ====
Athlete	Event	Qualification		Final	
Athlete	Event	Time	Rank	Opposition Time	Rank
Mohamad Yusof Hafizi Shaharuddin	1000 m time trial C1-3	1:18.355	4 Q	1:16.308	4
Mohamad Yusof Hafizi Shaharuddin	3000 m individual pursuit C1	4:00.687	3 Q	Bunyod Khayitmakhammadov (UZB); W OVL	3rd place, bronze medalist(s)
Muhammad Adi Raimie Amizazahan	1000 m time trial C1-3	1:13.612	5 Q	1:15.011	6
Muhammad Adi Raimie Amizazahan	3000 m individual pursuit C3	3:51.646	2 Q	Masaki Fujita (JPN); L 3:52.541	2nd place, silver medalist(s)
Zuhairie Ahmad Tarmizi	1000 m time trial C4-5	1:08.643	4 Q	1:09.787	4
Muhammad Hafiz Jamali	1000 m time trial C4-5	1:14.141	9	Did not advance	
Ahmad Ahlami Mohammad (Arfy Qhairant – pilot)	1000 m time trial B	1:07.950	4 Q	1:07.746	4
Ahmad Ahlami Mohammad (Arfy Qhairant – pilot)	4000 m individual pursuit B	4:56.936	6	Did not advance	
Mohd Khairul Hazwan Wahab (Khairul Adha Rasol – pilot)	1000 m time trial B	1:05.422	2 Q	1:05.740	2nd place, silver medalist(s)
Mohd Khairul Hazwan Wahab (Khairul Adha Rasol – pilot)	4000 m individual pursuit B	4:45.178	2 Q	Kim Jungbeen (Yoon Jungheon – pilot) (KOR); L OVL	2nd place, silver medalist(s)
Mohamad Yusof Hafizi Shaharuddin; Muhammad Hafiz Jamali; Muhammad Adi Raimie Amizazahan; Zuhairie Ahmad Tarmizi	Mixed team sprint	52.099	2 Q	China (CHN); L 52.356	2nd place, silver medalist(s)

=== Women ===
==== Road ====
Athlete	Event	Time	Rank
Nur Azlia Syafinaz Mohd Zais (Nurul Suhada Zainal – pilot)	Road race B	2:00:23	3rd place, bronze medalist(s)
Nur Azlia Syafinaz Mohd Zais (Nurul Suhada Zainal – pilot)	Time trial B	29:19.38	3rd place, bronze medalist(s)
Nur Suraiya Muhammad Zamri (Farina Shawati Mohd Adnan – pilot)	Road race B	2:18:10	7

==== Track ====
Athlete	Event	Qualification		Final	
Athlete	Event	Time	Rank	Opposition Time	Rank
Nur Azlia Syafinaz Mohd Zais (Nurul Suhada Zainal – pilot)	1000 m time trial B	1:14.393	2 Q	1:14.083	2nd place, silver medalist(s)
Nur Azlia Syafinaz Mohd Zais (Nurul Suhada Zainal – pilot)	3000 m individual pursuit B	3:52.231	3 Q	Rarinthip Saelo (Nontakaewworanan – pilot) (THA); W OVL	3rd place, bronze medalist(s)
Nur Suraiya Muhammad Zamri (Farina Shawati Mohd Adnan – pilot)	1000 m time trial B	1:13.263	1 Q	1:13.434	1st place, gold medalist(s)
Nur Suraiya Muhammad Zamri (Farina Shawati Mohd Adnan – pilot)	3000 m individual pursuit B	4:46.272	6	Did not advance	

== Football 5-a-side ==
Team	Event	Preliminary						Final / BM	
Team	Event	Opposition Score	Opposition Score	Opposition Score	Opposition Score	Opposition Score	Rank	Opposition Score	Rank
Malaysia national blind football team	Men's team	Thailand; L 0–3	India; L 0–1	China; L 0–4	Iran; L 0–2	Japan; L 0–2	6	Did not advance	

Squad

- Muhamad Azuan Abdul Rasiad
- Mohd Azuwan Atan
- Mohd Azwan Azhar
- Mohamad Amirul Arif Mahadhir
- Rollen Marakim
- Muhamad Azan Mat Hussin
- Luqmanulhakim Mohd Hamidon
- Muhammad Shazrul Izdhar Mohd Shuhaidi
- Luqman Hakim Mohd Sukri
- Ahmad Fikri Omar

== Lawn bowls ==
=== Men ===
Athlete	Event	Preliminary round						Semifinals	Final / BM	
Athlete	Event	Opposition Score	Opposition Score	Opposition Score	Opposition Score	Opposition Score	Rank	Opposition Score	Opposition Score	Rank
Mohd Zamrie Hasan	Singles B1	Kietkongtawee Krisada (THA); L 9–10	Dwi Widiantoro (INA); L 7–19	Weng Feibiao (CHN); L 10–18	Chen Guoqiang (CHN); L 8–17	—	5	Did not advance		
Muhamad Ayub Mohd	Singles B2	Thipphayamongkhonkun Kritsanu (THA); W W/O	Kwok Wing (HKG); W 15–14	Kacung (INA); W 14–7	Feng Shugui (CHN); L 9–18	Rockey Li Chi Ming (HKG); W `20–14	1 Q	Feng Shugui (CHN); W 13–12	Kacung (INA); L 8–15	2nd place, silver medalist(s)
Amirul Nabil Jamaludin	Singles B3	Taufik Abdul Karim (INA); L 3–16	Zhang Huayong (CHN); L 10–21	Mahendran Pasupathy (SGP); W 21–5	—		3	Did not advance		
Mohd Rafi Muda	Singles B6	Hwang Donggi (KOR); D 10–10	Mawjit Singh Gurmet Singh (SGP); L 10–16	Puk Chi Yeung (HKG); L 17–11	Balaji Krishna Murthy (IND); W 21–5	Praman Prayat (THA); L 9–21	5	Did not advance		
Haszely Elias	Singles B7	Kwon Hyuk Kyu (KOR); W 20–12	Sukjarern Choochat (THA); L 11–21	Dharmendra Kumar (IND); W 21–18	Lui Wai Kwong (HKG); W 21–10	James Joseph Michael (SGP); W 21–2	2 Q	Song Myeungjun (KOR); W 17–10	Sukjarern Choochat (THA); L 5–21	2nd place, silver medalist(s)

=== Women ===
Athlete	Event	Preliminary round						Semifinals	Final / BM	
Athlete	Event	Opposition Score	Opposition Score	Opposition Score	Opposition Score	Opposition Score	Rank	Opposition Score	Opposition Score	Rank
Hazel Sigang Daud	Singles B1	Methini Wongchomphu (THA); L 8–18	Huang Lingling (CHN); L 5–21	Nimatul Fauziyah (INA); L 5–21	Fan Hongyan (CHN); L 8–21	—	5	Did not advance		
Then Chiew Yen	Singles B2	Zhu Xiali (CHN); L 3–21	Tang Shun Yee (HKG); L 6–21	Nuttanicha Moya (THA); L 3–20	Julia Verawati (INA); L 7–20	—	5	Did not advance		
Norhasfalinda Hamdan	Singles B3	Heni Uswatun Chasanah (INA); W 12–10	Kong Qiaoli (CHN); L 4–21	Aitsaraphon Khwaengmueang (THA); L 8–19	—		4	Did not advance		
Rattna Aizah Mohd Idris	Singles B6	Faridah Salleh (SGP); L 8–20	Lee Mijeong (KOR); D 17–17	Chamnanpana Somwang (THA); L 5–21	Nirmala Devi (IND); W 21–2	—	4	Did not advance		
Jariah Zakaria	Singles B7	Wong Wai Yin Mandy (HKG); W 21–10	Karatak Nimit (THA); L 19–20	Ji Il Joo (KOR); W 21–18	Rinki (IND); W 21–8	—	2 Q	Wu Man Ying (HKG); L 12–19	Lee Dooyi (KOR); W 18–15	3rd place, bronze medalist(s)

=== Mixed ===
Athlete	Event	Preliminary round						Semifinals	Final / BM	
Athlete	Event	Opposition Score	Opposition Score	Opposition Score	Opposition Score	Opposition Score	Rank	Opposition Score	Opposition Score	Rank
Hazel Sigang Daud; Mohd Zamrie Hasan	Pairs B1	Fan Hongyan / Chen Guoqiang (CHN); L 5–18	Nimatul Fauziyah / Dwi Widiantoro (INA); L 4–15	Kietkongtawee Krisada / Methini Wongchomphu (THA); L 7–10	Weng Feibiao / Huang Lingling (CHN); W 11–6	—	5	Did not advance		
Then Chiew Yen; Muhamad Ayub Mohd	Pairs B2	Rockey Li Chi Ming / Tang Shun Yee (HKG); L 7–16	Zhu Xiali / Feng Shugui (CHN); L 4–15	Kacung / Julia Verawati (INA); W 13–9	Thipphayamongkhonkun Kritsanu / Nuttanicha Moya (THA); W W/O	—	4 Q	Zhu Xiali / Feng Shugui (CHN); L 8–16	Kacung / Julia Verawati (INA); L 7–14	4
Norhasfalinda Hamdan; Amirul Nabil Jamaludin	Pairs B3	Song Jinqi / Kong Qiaoli (CHN); L 9–16	Heni Uswatun Chasanah / Taufik Abdul Karim (INA); L 3–19	Tang Tsz Long Iron / Chan Ka Man (HKG); L 10–17	—		4	Did not advance		
Rattna Aizah Mohd Idris; Mohd Rafi Muda	Pairs B6	Praman Prayat / Chamnanpana Somwang (THA); L 6–22	Kang Jaebun / Hwang Donggi (KOR); L 3–20	Faridah Salleh / Mawjit Singh Gurmet Singh (SGP); L 5–19	Nirmala Devi / Balaji Krishna Murthy (IND); W 22–5	—	4	Did not advance		
Jariah Zakaria; Haszely Elias	Pairs B7	Dharmendra Kumar / Ray Nilima (IND); L 13–21	Kwon Hyuk Kyu / Ji Il Joo (KOR); W 15–8	Hisao Kojima / Setsuko Matsumoto (JPN); W 15–5	Lui Wai Kwong / Wong Wai Yin Mandy (HKG); W 13–8	—	2 Q	Zhou Xiaofang / Xu Yonggang (CHN); L 8–20	Kwon Hyuk Kyu / Ji Il Joo (KOR); W 15–10	3rd place, bronze medalist(s)

== Powerlifting ==
Men

Athlete	Event	Result	Rank
Azlan Mos	–59 kg	157	6
Bonnie Bunyau Gustin	–72 kg	230 APGR	1st place, gold medalist(s)
Bryan Junency Gustin	–80 kg	180	6
Nicodemus Manggoi Moses	–97 kg	210	3rd place, bronze medalist(s)
Jong Yee Khie	–107 kg	221	4

== Shooting ==
Athlete	Event	Qualification		Final	
Athlete	Event	Score	Rank	Score	Rank
Muhamad Khaidir Kassim	Mixed R3 – 10 m air rifle prone SH1	623.1	21	Did not advance	

== Swimming ==
=== Men ===
Athlete	Event	Heats		Final	
Athlete	Event	Result	Rank	Result	Rank
Muhammad Nur Syaiful Zulkafli	50 m freestyle S5	34.36	4 Q	33.93	4
Muhammad Nur Syaiful Zulkafli	100 m freestyle S5	1:19.48	4 Q	1:15.46	3rd place, bronze medalist(s)
Muhammad Nur Syaiful Zulkafli	200 m freestyle S5	2:53.93	5 Q	2:50.16	4
Muhammad Nur Syaiful Zulkafli	100 m breaststroke SB4	—		1:46.78 APGR	1st place, gold medalist(s)
Zy Kher Lee	50 m freestyle S5	38.45	10	Did not advance	
Zy Kher Lee	100 m freestyle S5	1:18.94	3 Q	1:19.50	5
Zy Kher Lee	200 m freestyle S5	2:50.43	1 Q	2:47.62	3rd place, bronze medalist(s)
Zy Kher Lee	100 m breaststroke SB4	—		2:11.80	3rd place, bronze medalist(s)
Abd Halim Mohammad	50 m freestyle S9	28.02	6 Q	28.18	7
Abd Halim Mohammad	100 m freestyle S8	1:06.45	3 Q	1:03.52	5
Abd Halim Mohammad	100 m breaststroke SB8	1:21.37	7 Q	1:15.66	4
Fraidden Dawan	100 m backstroke S10	1:13.34	8 Q	1:13.39	8
Fraidden Dawan	100 m butterfly S10	1:10.45	8 Q	1:10.38	8
Bryan Lau Sze Kai	200 m freestyle S14	2:02.17	5 Q	2:02.98	5
Bryan Lau Sze Kai	100 m backstroke S14	1:12.18	13	Did not advance	
Bryan Lau Sze Kai	100 m butterfly S14	59.77	6 Q	59.34	4
Bryan Lau Sze Kai	200 m individual medley SM14	2:34.19	12	Did not advance	
Muhammad Imaan Aiman Muhammad Redzuan	100 m backstroke S14	1:03.64	4 Q	1:02.98	3rd place, bronze medalist(s)
Muhammad Imaan Aiman Muhammad Redzuan	100 m butterfly S14	1:01.42	10	Did not advance	
Mohd Adib Iqbal Abdullah	100 m breaststroke SB14	1:13.31	6 Q	1:12.34	6
Mohd Adib Iqbal Abdullah	200 m individual medley SM14	2:31.40	10	Did not advance	

=== Women ===
Athlete	Event	Heats		Final	
Athlete	Event	Result	Rank	Result	Rank
Brenda Anellia Larry	100 m breaststroke SB6	2:35.19	10	Did not advance	
Lim Carmen	50 m freestyle S8	—		34.78	4
Lim Carmen	100 m backstroke S8	—		1:36.26	5
Lim Carmen	100 m breaststroke SB8	1:40.56	6 Q	1:39.10	6

== Table tennis ==
=== Men ===
Athlete	Event	Group Stage				Round of 16	Quarterfinals	Semifinals	Final / BM	
Athlete	Event	Opposition Result	Opposition Result	Opposition Result	Rank	Opposition Result	Opposition Result	Opposition Result	Opposition Result	Rank
Brady Zi Rong Chin	Singles class 9	Zhao Yi Qing (CHN); L 1–3	Hayuma Abe (JPN); L 1–3	—	3	Did not advance				
Chee Chaoming	Singles class 9	Linard Combras Sultan (PHI); W 3–1	Fan Yufei (CHN); L 1–3	Dattaprasad Jotiram Chougule (IND); W 3–0	2 Q	Mohammaderfan Gholami (IRI); L 1–3	Did not advance			
Jennahtul Fahmi Ahmad Jennah	Singles class 11	Chen Po-yen (TPE); L 0–3	Tsoi Ming Fai (HKG); W 3–0	—	2 Q	Wan Wai-lok (HKG); W 3–2	Takeshi Takemori (JPN); L 2–3	Did not advance		
Chee Chaoming; Brady Zi Rong Chin	Doubles class 18	—				Komet Akbar / Banyu Tri Mulyo (INA); L 1–3	Did not advance			

=== Women ===
Athlete	Event	Group Stage				Round of 16	Quarterfinals	Semifinals	Final / BM	
Athlete	Event	Opposition Result	Opposition Result	Opposition Result	Rank	Opposition Result	Opposition Result	Opposition Result	Opposition Result	Rank
Gloria Gracia Wong Sze	Singles class 10	Nozomi Nakamura (JPN); L 1–3	Hou Chunxiao (CHN); L 1–3	—	3	Did not advance				

=== Mixed ===
Athlete	Event	Round of 32	Round of 16	Quarterfinals	Semifinals	Final / BM	
Athlete	Event	Opposition Result	Opposition Result	Opposition Result	Opposition Result	Opposition Result	Rank
Gloria Gracia Wong Sze; Chee Chaoming	Doubles class 17-20	Bye	Lian Hao / Xiong Guiyan (CHN); L 0–3	Did not advance			

== Wheelchair basketball ==
Team	Event	Group stage					Semifinals	Final / BM	
Team	Event	Opposition Score	Opposition Score	Opposition Score	Opposition Score	Rank	Opposition Score	Opposition Score	Rank
Malaysia men's	Men's tournament	Chinese Taipei; L 52–53	South Korea; L 29–63	Japan; L 27–95	Kuwait; W 57-47	3	Semifinals 5-8; Afghanistan; W 65–64	Semifinals 5-6 Thailand; L 20–62	6

Squad

- Marzuan Abdullah
- Hafizuddin Bahrin
- Razali Cantik
- Ahmad Nazri Hamzah
- Muhammad Azzwar Hassan Asaari
- Muhammad Firdaus Ibrahim
- Muhammad Roozaimi Johari
- Karthik Kanapathy
- Muhammad Hafiz Ramli
- Fready Tan Yei Bing
- Tan Wei Min
- Muhammad Atib Zakaria

== Wheelchair fencing ==
Athlete	Event	Round of 32	Round of 16	Quarterfinals	Semifinals	Finals	
Athlete	Event	Opposition Score	Opposition Score	Opposition Score	Opposition Score	Opposition Score	Rank
Firdaus Shukor	Men's individual épée B	Lin Yu-Hao (TPE); L 13–15	Did not advance				
Firdaus Shukor	Men's individual foil B	—	Glass Sean (HKG); L 9–15	Did not advance			
Muhammad Adam Salleh	Men's individual épée B	—	Qin Benjun (CHN); L 7–15	Did not advance			
Muhammad Adam Salleh	Men's individual sabre B	—	Hu Daoliang (CHN); L 11–15	Did not advance			
Nooraishah Arshad	Women's individual foil A	—	Hyo Kyeong Kwon (KOR); L 1–15	Did not advance			
Nooraishah Arshad	Women's individual sabre A	—	Hyo Kyeong Kwon (KOR); L 7–15	Did not advance			

== Wheelchair tennis ==
=== Men ===
Athlete	Event	First round	Second round	Quarterfinals	Semifinals	Final / BM	
Athlete	Event	Opposition Result	Opposition Result	Opposition Result	Opposition Result	Opposition Result	Rank
Abu Samah Borhan	Singles	Naluemitr Benkhunthod (THA); W 2–1	Habal Hussein (IRQ); L 1–2	Did not advance			
Mohamad Yusshazwan Yusoff	Singles	Han Tsung Cheng (TPE); W 2–0	Tokito Oda (JPN); L 0–2	Did not advance			
Abu Samah Borhan; Mohamad Yusshazwan Yusoff	Doubles	—		Chao Han Tang / Chun Chieh Chen (TPE); W 2–0	Takuya Miki / Takashi Sanada (JPN); W 2–1	Im Howon / Han Sungbong (KOR); L 0–2	2nd place, silver medalist(s)

=== Women ===
Athlete	Event	First round	Quarterfinals	Semifinals	Final / BM	
Athlete	Event	Opposition Result	Opposition Result	Opposition Result	Opposition Result	Rank
Faizatul Ahya Abdullah Thani	Singles	Shiori Funamizu (JPN); L 0–2	Did not advance			
