= Sanskruti More =

Indian para chess player (born 2006)

Sanskruti Vikas More (born 2006) is an Indian para chess player. She was part of the Indian team for the women's chess B1 category at the 2022 Asian Para Games at Hangzhou, China. She is a visually challenged chess player. Along with Himanshi Rathi, Vruthi Jain, she won the women's team rapid VI-B1 bronze medal at the Asiad 2022.
