= Nimisha Chakkungalparambil =

Indian para-athlete

Personal information
- Full name: Nimisha Suresh Chakkungalparambil
- Born: 3 May 1995 (age 31)

Sport
- Sport: Para athletics
- Disability class: T47
- Event: long jump
Medal record
Women's para-athletics
Representing India
Asian Para Games
Gold medal – first place	2022 Hangzhou	Long jump T47

Nimisha Suresh Chakkungalparambil (born 3 May 1995) is an Indian para-athlete from Kerala. She competes in the women's T47 long jump event. She was selected for the Indian team that took part in the 2022 Hangzhou Asian Para Games. She won the T47 long jump gold medal on 25 October 2023.

== Career ==
Nimisha trained at the Sports Authority of India Centre of Excellence at Gandhinagar, Gujarat.

In February 2021, she won long jump F46/47 gold in the 2nd Fazza International World Para Athletics Grand Prix at Dubai clearing 5.25m. The Grand Prix was her first international event.
