= Raj Kumari (para powerlifting) =

Indian Paralympic powerlifter

Raj Kumari (born 1991) is an Indian para-power lifter from Delhi. She won a bronze medal at the 2022 Asian Para Games at Hangzhou, China in the women's 61 kg powerlifting event.

== Early life and education ==
She lives in Chhatarpur, New Delhi and takes tuition classes for students to meet her training expenses. She only receives a ‘disability pension’ of Rs.2500 per month. She trained under Tanvir Logani for the Asian Para Games. She was affected by polio in the childhood and met with an accident in 2018. She finished post-graduate in history through distance education at the Indira Gandhi National Open University.

== Career ==
Kumari won the bronze medal in the women's 61 kg category at the 2022 Asian Games finishing behind Zainab Khatoon, who clinched the silver for India. Earlier, she took part in the Tbilisi 2021 World Para Powerlifting Senior World Championships at Georgia.
