= Pooja Yadav =

Indian Paralympic athlete (born 1989)

Medal record

Representing India

Women's para-athletics

Asian Para Games
Silver medal – second place	2022 Hangzhou	Discus throw F54/55

Pooja Yadav (born 1989) is a para athlete from Haryana. She represented India at the 2022 Asian Para Games and won a silver medal in the women's discus throw F54/55 event on 25 October 2023.

== Early life and background ==
Yadav hails from Tauru in Nuh district of Haryana. During childhood, she fell in a well at the age of eight and suffered irreversible spinal injury and has been using wheelchair. She is a single-parent child and her father is a farmer. She is supported by a scholarship from M3M foundation.

== Career ==
=== Domestic ===
She won her first medal in shot put in 2017 at the 17th National Para Athletics at Jaipur. In 2018, in the 18th National Para athletics championship at Panchkula, she won two gold medals in javelin throw and shot put and got a bronze in the discus throw. In 2021, she won three gold medals winning all the throw events at the Indian Open Para athletics championship in Bengaluru.

=== International ===
In 2019, Yadav made her international debut taking part in the World Para Athletics Grand Prix Championship in Dubai and won a bronze medal in discus throw. In July 2023, she won a bronze medal in javelin at the World Para Athletics Championship in Paris to book a berth for the 2022 Asian Para Games in China.
