= Himanshi Rathi =

Indian para chess player

Himanshi Bhaveshbhai Rathi (born 30 October 1999) is an Indian para chess player from Gujarat. She was part of the Indian team for the women's chess B1 category at the 2022 Asian Para Games at Hangzhou, China. She is a visually challenged chess player. Along with Sanskruti More, Vruthi Jain, the trio won the women's team rapid VI-B1 bronze medal.

== Early life ==
Himanshi is from Ahmedabad. She is born to Bhavesh Rathi, a business man, and Dipali Rathi. Her sister Urvi is a gymnast with visual impairment. After she lost her sight in her Class 10, she started playing chess to develop concentration. She passed her BA in English with gold medal from Gujarat University. Before the Asian Para Games, she trained under coach Hemal Thanki.

== Career ==
She won the All Indian Chess Federation for the Blind National Women's Chess Championship 2022, where the top three players were selected to the Indian team for the Asian Para Games. She was also the National champion in 2019 and 2020. Her early coaches were Ashwin Makwana and Hemal Thanki and Jalpan Bhatt.
