= Rakshitha Raju =

Indian runner (born 2001)

Personal information
- Born: 15 January 2001 (age 25) Chikmagalur, India

Sport
- Sport: Paralympic athletics
Medal record
Women's para-athletics
Representing India
Asian Para Games
Gold medal – first place	2018 Jakarta	1500m T11
Gold medal – first place	2022 Hangzhou	1500m T11

Rakshitha Raju (born 15 January 2001) is an Indian runner, who is visually impaired. She takes part in the women's 1500 metres T11 category. She was selected for the Indian team that took part in the 2022 Hangzhou Asian Para Games. She won the gold medal Asian Para Games behind China's Shanshan He. Later, Shanshan was disqualified and Raju was promoted to take the gold medal. She clocked 5 minutes, 21.45 seconds. Being a visually handicapped runner, Rakshitha completed the race with the help of a guide Rahul Balakrishna.

== Early life and education ==
Rakshitha hails from Baluguddanahalli village in Chikkamagalur district. She was a student of Asha Kirana Andha Makkala Shale (blind school) in Chikkamagaluru. She learnt her basics under coach and mentor Balakrishna, who is also her guide runner. She was introduced to Balakrishna by her initial guide runner Sowmya at Asha Kirana school. She lost both her parents at an early age and was brought up by her grandmother, who was dumb and deaf. She was a product of the Sports Authority of India, Bengaluru. Rahul was her first coach.

== Career ==
Rakshitha took part in the 1500m at the Para Athletics World Championships in July 2023. Earlier in 2021, she won a bronze medal in the 1500m event at World Para Athletics Grand Prix 2021 in Dubai after another bronze in 2019, at the World Para Athletics Grand Prix Paris where she clocked her personal best of 5.29.00 . She also won a gold medals in the 1500m and 800m events at the 2019 World Para Athletics Junior Championships, Nottwil, Switzerland.

In 2017, she was selected for the Youth Asian Games but could not travel due to passport issues. However, in 2018 she won the Gold in the 1500m event at the Asian Para Games at Jakarta.

== Domestic career ==
In 2022, she won a gold medal in the 200m, 400m and 1500m events at the 20th National Para Athletics Championships, Odisha. In 2021 she won the gold medal in the 400m and 1500m events at the 19th National Para Athletics Championships, Bengaluru.
