= 2000 Summer Paralympics =

Multi-parasport event in Sydney, New South Wales, Australia

XI Paralympic Games
- Location: Sydney, Australia
- Motto: Performance, Power and Pride
- Nations: 123
- Athletes: 3,879
- Events: 550 in 19 sports
- Opening: 18 October 2000
- Closing: 29 October 2000
- Opened by: Governor-General Sir William Deane
- Closed by: IPC President Robert Steadward
- Cauldron: Louise Sauvage
- Stadium: Stadium Australia

The 2000 Summer Paralympic Games or the XI Summer Paralympics were held in Sydney, New South Wales, Australia, between 18 and 29 October. The Sydney Paralympics was the last time that the Summer Paralympics were organised by two different Organizing Committees. In this edition, a record 3,801 athletes from 123 National Paralympic Committees participated in 551 events in 19 sports. The 2000 Summer Paralympics were the second largest sporting event ever until that date held in Australia and in the Southern Hemisphere. Sydney was the eighth city to jointly host the Olympic and Paralympic Games. However, it was only the fourth to jointly organise both events in complete conjunction with the Olympics. This edition was also the first time that the Paralympics were held in Australia and Oceania.

The mascot for the 2000 Paralympics was Lizzie the frill-necked lizard.

== Host city bid process ==
=== Historical context and changes to host city selection ===
Before the International Paralympic Committee became fully operational in 1993, host cities for the Olympic and Paralympic Games were selected through separate processes, with cities submitting independent bids for each event.

Following challenges related to the 1992 Summer Paralympics (shared by Barcelona and Madrid) and issues that threatened the 1996 Summer Paralympics, the International Olympic Committee (IOC) changed its host city selection process. The IOC began requiring cities bidding for the Olympics to include their plans for hosting the Paralympic Games. Starting with the 2000 Summer Olympics, the IOC mandated that both events be organized under a single framework, though this unified structure was not fully implemented until the 2008 Summer Olympics in Beijing. Sydney was the last city to submit separate bids for the Olympic and Paralympic Games.

=== Early IPC structure and the Atlanta experience ===
Following the success of the 1992 Summer Paralympics, the International Coordinating Committee for Disabled Sports (ICC) was dissolved in February 1993. The International Paralympic Committee (IPC) assumed its functions the following month. The IPC had already been operating and had selected host cities for the 1994 and 1998 Winter Games and the 1996 Summer Games.

The 1994 Winter Paralympics in Lillehammer were held without major incidents reported. In contrast, the 1996 Summer Paralympics in Atlanta faced organizational challenges. A lack of coordination between the Olympic and Paralympic organizers led to communication breakdowns, conflicts, and legal disputes. This differed from Barcelona, where a single committee had coordinated both events.

The difficulties in Atlanta shaped the IPC's approach to future host city selections. As a recently established institution with limited political influence, the IPC lacked leverage to negotiate directly with Olympic organizers. The IOC intervened by requiring bidding cities to include their Paralympic plans in Olympic bid questionnaires; cities that failed to provide clear responses could be eliminated from consideration.

This change, implemented for the 2000 Summer Olympics, was unanticipated by some cities. Bidding cities received additional evaluation time to accommodate the new requirements. According to the IOC's initial evaluation results, all five finalist cities were capable of hosting the games, with Sydney and Beijing rated slightly ahead in technical preparation, infrastructure, and overall vision.

=== The 2000 Summer Olympics bidding process ===
Despite the new IOC requirements, the IPC had no voting power in the host city selection process for the 2000 Summer Olympics; it could only be consulted. After three cities withdrew, five finalists remained. The IOC sent their projects to the IPC for analysis.

In its preliminary assessment in early 1993, the IPC identified four bids: Beijing, Manchester, Sydney, and Berlin, as viable for the Paralympics. Istanbul was eliminated.

Beijing, Manchester, and Berlin submitted integrated Olympic‑Paralympic proposals. Sydney initially proposed a separate bid, relying on a private funding model similar to Los Angeles (1984) and Atlanta (1996). Public and political pressure later led to a shift toward a public‑private partnership. Australian law prevented the merger of the Olympic and Paralympic bid committees until a legislative act in 1995. During this period, the Olympic committee assisted the newly formed Australian Paralympic Committee in preparing a simplified Paralympic proposal, which was presented to the IPC in September 1993.

The other bids faced various challenges. Beijing had political and logistical uncertainties; Manchester lacked solid financial support and infrastructure; Berlin faced difficulties related to post‑reunification issues. Sydney's proposal, though more modest in scope, had government backing and popular support. It was unanimously selected by the 94 National Paralympic Committees then part of the IPC to host the 2000 Summer Paralympics.

=== Delays and contingency planning ===
The IPC's decision could not be announced immediately, as it might have interfered with the ongoing IOC selection process for the Olympic host city. The decision was kept secret for several months until the Olympic process concluded.

A further issue was the lack of solid financial guarantees for the Paralympic Games, which remained unresolved until months before the event. To cover costs, organizers imposed registration fees on athletes, an unprecedented measure. Some National Paralympic Committees, particularly in developing countries, lacked government support and could not afford participation, leading to reduced representation and the exclusion of some athletes.

The IPC also prepared for the possibility that the Olympic host city might differ from the city selected for the Paralympics. Contingency plans included negotiating with the winning Olympic city to secure commitments to host the Paralympics, or as a backup, moving the games to Great Britain because of its historical ties to the Paralympic movement. After Sydney was selected as the Olympic host and later committed to hosting the Paralympics, these contingency plans were not needed.

=== Subsequent winter games ===
==== Salt Lake City 2002 ====
The organizational difficulties of the 1996 Summer Games were still under discussion when the bidding process for the 2002 Winter Olympics began in 1993. The IOC applied the same requirements used for the 2000 Summer Games, requiring bidding cities to address Paralympic plans. Salt Lake City won the bid. The Salt Lake City bidding committee publicly committed to organizing the Winter Paralympics alongside the Olympics.

==== Turin 2006 ====
The 2006 Winter Olympics organizing committee (TOROC) faced an operating deficit of €95 million and decided not to organize the Paralympic Games directly. In September 2005, TOROC transferred its Paralympic department to a newly formed public‑private entity, ComParTo (Turin Paralympic Organizing Committee), for one euro cent, while contributing €40 million toward its operating costs. ComParTo was funded by local companies, the Italian Paralympic Committee, and the Piedmont Region. Although separate, it shared operational sectors including marketing, logistics, and infrastructure with TOROC to ensure coordination.

== Background to the bid process ==
=== Context before the games ===
The United States and Australia have long been active participants in the Paralympic movement. Nevertheless, during the late 1980s and early 1990s, local authorities in both countries were slow to recognize that the Olympic and Paralympic Games could no longer be held separately. The Paralympics were often viewed as a secondary event or a financial liability.

Atlanta's 1996 Summer Paralympics were marked by administrative and financial difficulties stemming from two separate organizing committees that had been in conflict since the city's Olympic bid in 1987. Atlanta's Olympic project followed a 100% private financing model similar to Los Angeles 1984, which helped it win the bid but left no flexibility or funding for the Paralympics.

When Sydney won the Australian Olympic Committee's internal selection in 1990, there were initial proposals to replicate the private‑funding model. However, strong public interest and the need for urban redevelopment led to a broader partnership. As the project evolved, it gained support at all levels of government, eventually resulting in a funding structure with three equal partners—federal government, city, and private investors—each contributing one‑third of the games budget.

=== History of the Paralympic movement in Australia ===
Despite Australia's long history of participation in the Paralympic movement, including medal wins in the previous eight Summer Paralympics, the country had traditionally shown little interest in Paralympic sport. During the bidding process for the 2000 Summer Olympics, Sydney initially did not submit a proposal to host the Paralympics. As Sydney emerged as a favoured candidate, this lack of interest became a competitive disadvantage relative to Manchester and Berlin, both of which proposed an integrated management model similar to Barcelona's.

Between 1989 and 1993, Germany and Great Britain—both traditional powers in the Olympic and Paralympic movements—held greater international reputation than Australia. Australian media coverage of Paralympic athletes was minimal during this period, and even strong results, including fifth place at the 1992 Summer Paralympics and second place in 1996, did not generate sustained public attention. Within some sectors of Australian society, the Paralympics continued to be regarded as a secondary event.

=== The impact of Barcelona and Atlanta at the bids for the 2000 Games ===
- See also: 1984 Summer Olympics, 1996 Summer Olympics, 1996 Summer Paralympics.

The joint management of the 1992 Summer Paralympics had opened new possibilities for the games, but the disorganization surrounding the 1996 Summer Paralympics in Atlanta threatened to damage the Paralympic movement. In Atlanta, the Olympic and Paralympic Games were planned by two separate organizing committees operating without communication or coordination. By contrast, Nagano, host of the 1998 Winter Paralympics, also used two separate committees, but they shared the same stakeholders, providing greater stability.

Following the financial success of the 1984 Summer Olympics, several U.S. cities pursued Olympic bids. Atlanta (1996) and later Salt Lake City (2002) adopted a private‑funding model similar to 1984, relying on sponsors rather than public funds. Under this approach, Atlanta's organizing committee did not include the Paralympics in its plans, leading to funding shortfalls and public criticism once the situation became known.

As Salt Lake City was already in the bidding process for the 2002 Winter Olympics, the IOC changed its approach. In 1994, it signed a strategic partnership with the IPC, requiring future host cities to organize both Games under the same organizing committee.

=== Two committees, too much confusion ===
ACOG (the Atlanta Olympic organizing committee) was criticized for neglecting the Paralympics, citing the event's lower economic returns and visibility compared to the Olympics. The Shepherd Center, a local spinal cord injury hospital, led a public campaign to secure the games. A backup agreement was reportedly in place to move the 1996 Summer Paralympics to an undisclosed city in Great Britain if Atlanta declined or proved unable to host.

Despite pressure from the United States Olympic Committee (USOC) and sponsors—some of whom threatened to withdraw funding—the Shepherd Center’s efforts succeeded in keeping the Paralympics in Atlanta. The games ultimately faced organizational difficulties, with raised funds being used by ACOG to contract essential services.

=== The Olympic bidding process ===
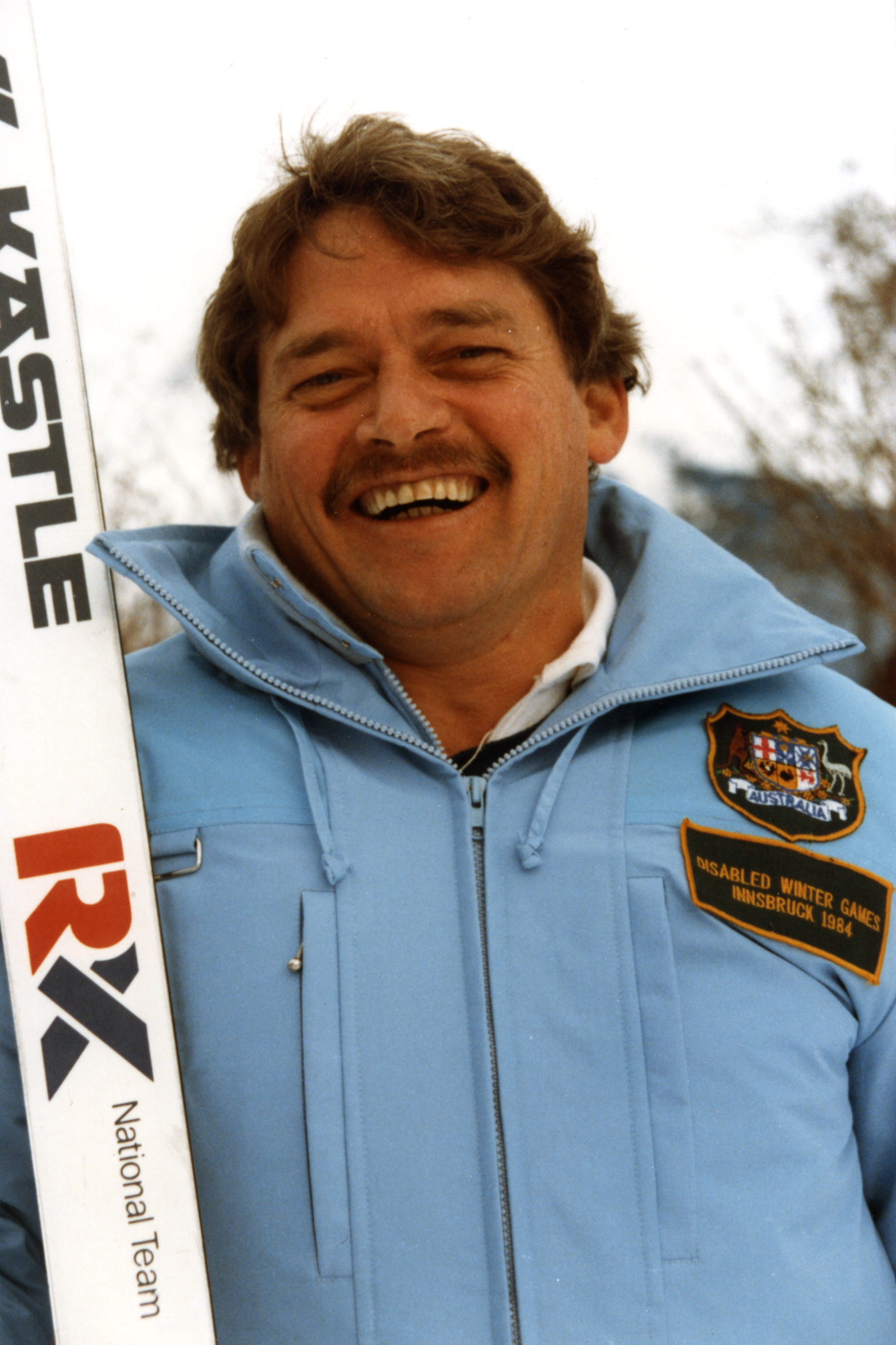
Then-president of the Australian Paralympic Federation, Ron Finneran, during the 1984 Winter Paralympics, held in Innsbruck, Austria

When the bidding process for the 2000 Summer Olympics opened, eight National Olympic Committees showed initially expressed interest: Australia, Brazil, China, Germany, Great Britain, Italy, Turkey and Uzbekistan. Six of them indicated in their bid documents an intention to also host the Paralympics.

Brazil, Italy, and Uzbekistan later withdrew, leaving five finalists. The IPC evaluated the candidates and determined that Turkey did not meet the conditions to host the Paralympic Games. The remaining four bids still faced various technical and feasibility requirements.

==== Sydney's reluctance to host the Paralympics ====
Sydney's Olympic bid committee (SOBC) initially showed little interest in hosting the Paralympics. Several factors contributed to this hesitation:

- Concerns that winning both bids might overstretch the city's capacity.
- The ongoing disarray in Atlanta, where separate organizing committees clashed over budget, logistics, and venue quality.
- In Atlanta, the Olympic Village and many competition venues were not accessible or were located far from Paralympic events.
- Sponsorship conflicts: Atlanta organizers had resisted selling Paralympic sponsorship packages that might compete with Olympic sponsors.

The IOC intervened in Atlanta by purchasing a sponsorship quota and encouraging its partners to do the same, helping to secure some funding. However, the experience underscored the risks of separate organizing committees.

In 1993, the IOC changed the rules: starting with the 2002 Winter Olympics bid process, all applicant cities were required to include plans for the Paralympic Games.

Meanwhile, Sydney's bid committee remained skeptical about hosting the Paralympics, citing low market appeal and the difficulties seen in Atlanta. The Australian Paralympic Federation (APF), led by Ron Finneran, pushed for inclusion, but the Olympic committee doubted the APF's capacity to manage a Games. The APF had limited funding, relying on government and member contributions.

Public concerns also arose about television rights and funding. Broadcasting rights were not resolved until 1999, when the Australian Broadcasting Corporation (ABC) took on the local broadcast role. The Paralympics lacked the commercial appeal of the Olympics or Commonwealth Games, making private sponsorship difficult to secure.

=== The beginning of the dream ===
Following the integration of the Olympic and Paralympic Games in Barcelona, early contacts between the APF and the Sydney 2000 Bid Committee (SOBC) took place in 1991 and early 1992. Sydney formally registered its interest in hosting the Paralympic Games in March 1993.

As with previous Olympic host cities, the SOBC did not initially plan to bid for the Paralympics unless Sydney secured the Olympic Games. Legal constraints under Australian law also complicated planning. The SOBC was established as a specific-purpose entity, jointly owned in equal parts by the Australian Olympic Committee, the Government of New South Wales, and the Commonwealth of Australia. Its structure could not be altered, and it was required to dissolve at the end of the bid process regardless of the outcome. These limitations prevented it from formally incorporating Paralympic planning, leaving the APF to proceed independently.

Among the candidate cities, Beijing, Berlin, Manchester, and Sydney were considered technically capable of hosting the Paralympic Games, while Istanbul was excluded on feasibility grounds. Most bids proposed staging the Olympic and Paralympic Games jointly to share resources; Sydney was the only exception.

Berlin was widely regarded as a leading candidate, supported by plans to align the games with broader national events, including the tenth anniversary of German reunification and Expo 2000. However, public opposition and protests shortly before the final vote weakened its bid.

Manchester's bid was also considered strong but was affected by delays in urban redevelopment and criticism of its promotional campaign. Its proposal further faced technical issues, including a schedule exceeding the maximum permitted duration for the Paralympic Games at the time. Despite this, the city later hosted the 2002 Commonwealth Games.

Beijing's bid was viewed as less competitive, citing organizational and legislative limitations, including accessibility concerns and the broader political context following the events of 1989.

With other candidates weakened or eliminated, Sydney emerged as the only remaining viable option, despite ongoing concerns regarding financial and structural guarantees.

During the initial feasibility phase, the SOBC had declined to include the Paralympic Games, partly due to organizational challenges observed in the lead-up to the 1996 Atlanta Games, where the Olympic and Paralympic events were managed separately. This led the International Paralympic Committee (IPC) to consider alternative arrangements, including potential backup options in the United Kingdom.

At the same time, the organization of the 1996 Paralympic Games in Atlanta faced significant difficulties but was ultimately completed through local initiatives, including support from civil society organizations such as the Shepherd Center.

=== The Sydney Olympic affair ===
On 19 June 1991, the Sydney City Council and the Government of New South Wales agreed to pursue a bid for the 2000 Summer Olympics. The Sydney Olympics 2000 Bid Limited (SOBC) was established the same day to manage the campaign. Sydney's bid emphasized Australia's longstanding participation in the Olympic Games, as well as the country's sporting culture and experience in hosting major international events. It also incorporated emerging priorities in Olympic planning, including environmental considerations and logistics.

The International Olympic Committee (IOC) established guidelines for the bidding process during the 1992 Winter Olympics in Albertville. Sydney was formally registered as a candidate city in April 1992, and representatives of the bid committee attended Olympic events and related meetings throughout 1992 to promote the proposal.

In March 1993, the IOC confirmed that seven cities had submitted bids for the 2000 Games. The International Paralympic Committee (IPC) did not participate directly in the selection process, although Paralympic-related matters were included in the bid documentation.

Sydney performed strongly in the preliminary evaluation phase, finishing in first place. Beijing was widely regarded as a leading contender during the campaign, but Sydney was ultimately selected as host city by a margin of two votes. Contemporary commentary attributed the result to Australia's experience in organizing major sporting events and the perceived reliability of its bid, which emphasized infrastructure, environmental planning, and organizational capacity.

=== The Sydney Paralympic affair ===
In contrast to its Olympic bid, Sydney initially did not plan to host the Paralympic Games, and joint organization of the two events was not included in the early stages of the project. Representatives of the newly formed Paralympics Australia expressed concern that the opportunity might be overlooked, particularly in light of the integrated approach adopted at the 1992 Barcelona Games. They advocated for Sydney to consider hosting the Paralympics as part of a broader commitment to equal opportunities and disability awareness.

Following the submission of preliminary bid documents, it was reported that six of the seven candidate cities had provided guarantees to host the Paralympic Games. Sydney's absence from this group was seen as a potential weakness in its bid. Other candidates, including Berlin and Manchester, proposed fully integrated организаtion and financing of both events.

As a result, Sydney revised its proposal to include the Paralympic Games before submitting final documentation to the International Olympic Committee in Lausanne. Despite this change, structural and legal constraints prevented full integration between the Olympic bid committee and Paralympic organizers, raising the possibility that the two events would be managed by separate organizing bodies, as planned for the 1996 Atlanta Games.

=== Third phase: the fight continues ===
As the final presentation phase approached, the Sydney Paralympic bid committee (SPBC) was established. Compared to other candidates, it operated with a more limited structure and resources, reflecting the lower level of institutional support available to the bid.

=== The APF's resilience ===
The Australian Paralympic Federation (APF), established in the late 1980s, assumed responsibility for Sydney's bid for the 2000 Summer Paralympic Games. In its early years, it also took on functions previously held by the Australian Confederation of Sports for the Disabled, which ceased operations on 31 December 1989. These responsibilities were later assumed by the Australian Paralympic Committee (APC).

As part of the bid process, the APF coordinated planning efforts, engaged with stakeholders, and promoted Australia's capacity to host the Paralympic Games. Its activities included advocating for greater recognition of para-athletes and the integration of the Paralympic movement within Australian sport.

The organization had previously secured government support for its establishment, including backing from Prime Minister Bob Hawke. It was also provided office space at the New South Wales Sport House by the Government of New South Wales.

=== Fourth phase: "We are on this" ===
As 1992 drew to a close, preparations for Sydney's Paralympic bid intensified, with the Australian Paralympic Federation (APF) required to present its proposal to external stakeholders. Public engagement with the Olympic bid increased during this period, although support for hosting the Paralympic Games remained more limited.

Ahead of the submission deadline of 21 March 1993, the bid proposal was developed in collaboration with the Sydney Olympic bid committee. The final documentation included letters of support from senior government officials, including the Prime Minister, the Premier of New South Wales, and the Lord Mayor of Sydney.

The proposal was presented to the International Paralympic Committee (IPC) at a meeting in Lillehammer, where candidate cities outlined their plans. Compared to other bids, Sydney's presentation was described as more limited in scale and resources, reflecting the relatively modest structure of its Paralympic bid organization. Support from the Olympic bid committee included covering travel expenses for the delegation, although the Paralympic bid team remained responsible for producing its own materials.

During the Lillehammer presentation, the estimated budget for the Paralympic Games was placed at over AU$84 million. Funding was expected to come from sponsorship, ticket sales, licensing, marketing activities, and contributions from the New South Wales and Australian governments.

=== 1993: almost everything collapses ===
1993 proved to be a decisive year for both the Sydney Olympic and Paralympic bids. At the beginning of the year, the Australian Paralympic Federation (APF) confirmed that it had obtained formal support from government authorities and the Sydney Olympic bid committee.

Despite this support, the Paralympic bid continued to face significant financial uncertainty. The APF lacked sufficient resources to fund the bid independently, and financial guarantees had not yet been secured. Contemporary assessments also suggested that the Paralympic Games had more limited commercial potential than the Olympic Games, which further complicated fundraising efforts.

Revised cost estimates placed the projected budget for the Paralympic Games at approximately AU$82 million. Funding was expected to come from a combination of ticket sales, sponsorship, licensing, fundraising activities, and contributions from public authorities, although a substantial shortfall remained. In response, the organizers explored the possibility of coordinating marketing efforts with the Olympic bid in order to attract shared sponsors and private-sector support.

Later in the year, Sydney's bid progressed to the final phase, including inspection visits by the International Paralympic Committee (IPC) and a final presentation to member organizations in Berlin on 12 September 1993. The selection took place shortly before the 101st Session of the International Olympic Committee in Monte Carlo, where Sydney was ultimately chosen as host city for the 2000 Summer Olympics by a margin of two votes.

With Sydney's selection, the city was confirmed as host of both the Olympic and Paralympic Games, continuing the practice of staging the two events in the same host city. The Paralympic Games were scheduled to take place shortly after the Olympic Games in 2000.

=== After the elections: first innovative proposal ===
On 19 April 1993, representatives of the Australian Paralympic Federation (APF) informed government authorities that neither the organization nor the wider disability sports community had the capacity to assume full financial or organizational responsibility for the Paralympic Games. They proposed that the Olympic and Paralympic Games should be planned and marketed jointly in order to ensure their viability.

In May 1993, the APF established a small committee to coordinate the bid strategy. The group produced a policy document outlining the conditions under which the Paralympic Games would be organized if Sydney were selected as host city, as well as the organization's position in negotiations with government and Olympic authorities.

Despite progress in the bid process, uncertainties regarding funding and governance continued. These issues led to further negotiations in the following years. In 1995, as legislation related to the games was considered by the Australian Parliament, the Sydney Paralympic Organizing Committee was established within the structure of the Sydney Organising Committee for the Olympic Games (SOCOG).

== Costs ==
The Sydney 2000 Paralympic Bidding Committee (SPBC) initially estimated that staging the games would require a budget of approximately AU$84 million, to be funded primarily through ticket sales, sponsorship, licensing, and marketing, with limited contributions from the federal and New South Wales governments. Early projections did not include revenue from broadcasting rights, and market assessments at the time suggested limited commercial potential compared to the Olympic Games, making sponsorship more difficult to secure.

In 1993, revised estimates placed the budget at AU$82.67 million. Confirmed and projected revenues covered only part of this amount, leaving a substantial funding shortfall. Government contributions were subsequently increased, with financial support provided by both the New South Wales and Commonwealth governments.

Over the following years, projected costs rose significantly. By 1998, total expenses were estimated at AU$150 million, with an identified shortfall that organizers sought to address through additional sponsorship and ticket sales.

The final cost of the games was estimated at AU$157 million. Funding was provided through a combination of government contributions, support from the Sydney Organising Committee for the Olympic Games (SOCOG), and revenue from sponsorship and ticketing. The Sydney Paralympic Organising Committee (SPOC), established following the award of the games in 1993, was responsible for delivering the event under the terms of the host city agreement with the International Paralympic Committee.

== Environment ==
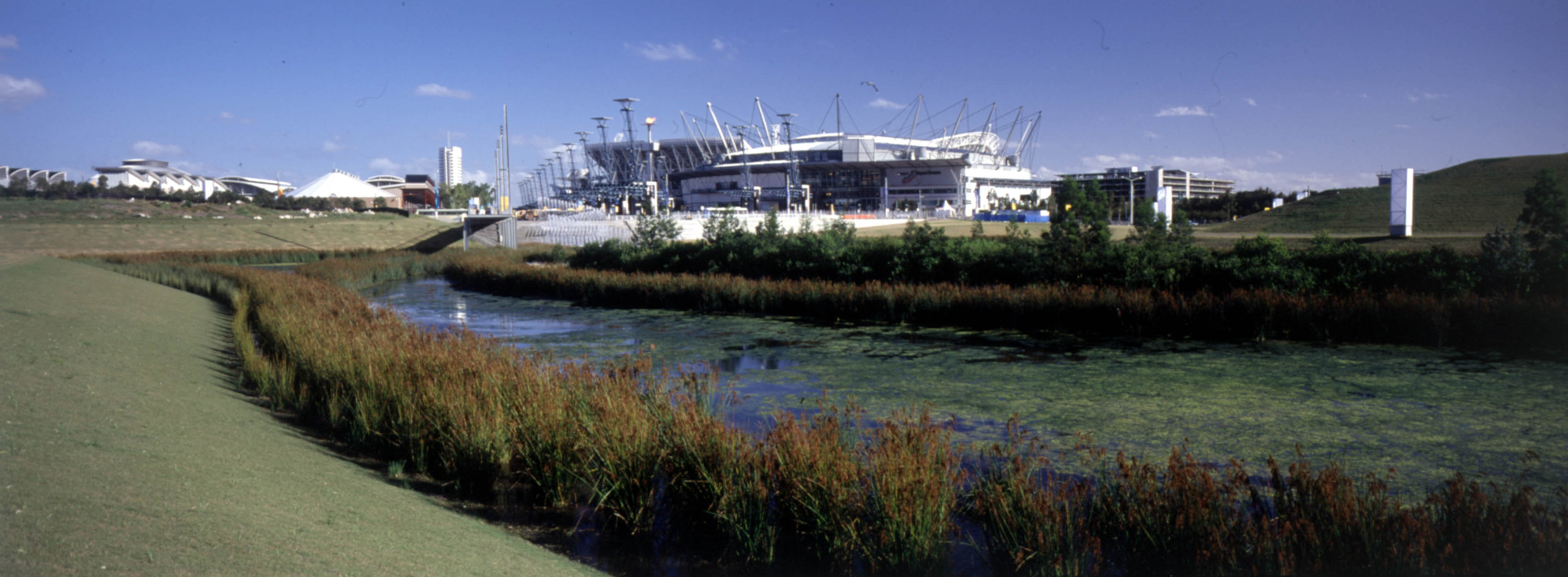
Daytime view of pond with water lilies at Sydney Olympic Park during the 2000 Sydney Paralympic Games.

The Olympic and Paralympic project emphasized the first stage of the Millennium Parklands, which covers 450 hectares and includes up to 40 kilometers of pedestrian and cycle trails, designed to integrate with the competition venues and support recreation, conservation, and environmental education.

Water management strategies included the Water Reclamation and Management Scheme (WRAMS), which supplied recycled water for flushing and irrigation during the games and was planned for continued development afterward. Additional measures included using stormwater runoff from Newington and rainwater collected from Stadium Australia's roof for irrigation, along with a requirement that Olympic venues adopt water‑saving technologies. An environmental education program ran in 1999–2000 to reinforce the games’ environmental legacy.

== Administration ==
The 2000 Summer Paralympic Games were overseen by the IPC, led by president Robert Steadward. The Sydney Paralympic Organising Committee (SPOC), headed by Dr. John Grant and CEO Lois Appleby, was established on 12 November 1993, by the same legislative act that created SOCOG (Sydney Organising Committee for the Olympic Games). Initially, SPOC operated as a subsidiary of SOCOG with separate budget and autonomy. However, early negotiations (1993–1995) revealed overlapping functions, and lessons from Atlanta led to a decision to merge the two organizations. An Olympic Coordinating Authority (OCA) was created to mediate common issues.

In January 1995, SPOC became a public company limited by guarantee under SOCOG, but the two operated independently without full legal integration. They shared personnel and structures, with OCA overseeing both. Each retained specific responsibilities: SOCOG handled marketing, ticketing, broadcasting, ceremonies, and athlete housing; SPOC managed venue conversion between the games, athlete classification, and Paralympic branding.

Despite the merger, Paralympic preparations lagged. In June 1997, OCA established a Joint Risk Management Committee to mediate potential conflicts. In November 1997, the Sydney 2000 Games Administration Act was passed, transferring assets and liabilities to OCA after the games.

To address Paralympic‑specific needs, the IPC pushed for additional support. In 1998, a Liaison Committee was formed to mediate between SPOC and the IPC. Earlier, SPOC hired Xavier Gonzalez, who had held similar roles in Barcelona and Atlanta, to oversee competition venues, athlete services, and the Paralympic calendar—which was revised several times before finalization in early 2000.

== Educational program ==
As part of the Educational Program, developed with all spheres of government and civil society, a multitude of monitoring and participation programs were developed with a view to helping the games organisation raise the AU$20 million that was needed for the games' account to be closed.

=== "Set No Limits" kits ===
The first educational initiative started in July 1998, SPOC distributed 10,000 free information resource kits to public and private schools and also to universities and libraries across Australia an educational material called "Set No Limits". Designed to raise awareness and build anticipation of the Paralympic Games among students through a series of playing and learning activities based on the Paralympic sport and a collective healthy lifestyle. In this material there were also several questions related to the performance of para-athletes and what motivated them to practice the sport. Together with the function of encouraging the participation of young people in order to spark their curiosity so that they would assist them during the preparation period. This series of guides and proposed activities were developed by teachers, educators and Paralympic athletes such as the wheelchair basketball player Liesl Tesch. The "Set No Limits" was a multidisciplinary project and included technical sheets, videos, spreadsheets and other lot of class and work materials, activity proposals for physical education classes and official posters. The exercises and activities were all related to the athletes' personal life stories, health and quality of life issues and also specific focus at the venues on Sydney Olympic Park and had Lizzie, the games' mascot also a protagonist. Mainly aimed at students aged 8 to 15, the kit helps young Australians value and respect the commitment and performance of elite athletes with disabilities and encourages them to attend the Paralympic Games to see the athletes compete.

=== LEAP (Link Elite Athletes Program) ===
When a school finished all the stages from the "Set No Limits", the institution was invited to be part of LEAP (Link Elite Athletes Program). Schools interested in being part of LEAP received a series of documents that had to be sent to the SPOC education department confirming their intentions to participate. In these documents, the institution was consulted about their characteristics and what type of athlete they wanted to be chosen to carry out the project. Exchanges between schools and athletes took place three times a year between 1998 and 2000 and they collected letters, faxes, cards, emails, drawings and photographs as they learned from each other realities. If this athlete lived or trained less than 200 km from the school where he was communicating, he could, in one of these opportunities, adopt the school and, visit the students in person in special events or during the school year. The students learned about the lifestyle, routine and specificities of each athlete with their training schedules and training methods. They also shared their experiences and dreams in view of the Paralympic Games. The exchange also allowed students to break down ideas and paradigms about what is necessary to be a Paralympian the standards so that each athlete can qualify for the Paralympic Games, together with the understanding of what "disability is" and what sport is Paralympic or adapted and how it is practiced.

The original goals of the LEAP program were to reach more than 1000 schools by April 2000, with 60 of them in a special category. Because they were "schools that are more than 3000km from Sydney". SPOC aimed to attract more than 2,500 schools as members and encourage more than 170,000 students to be at the Olympic Park during the 12-day Games, a goal that was made easier with the introduction of a specific grant from the Australian Federal Government, which helped schools that were more than 200 km or more away from Sydney Olympic Park.

This donation of AU$1.3 million was specifically for those schools that were within the LEAP program. Those schools beyond 200 km of Sydney Olympic Park that participate in the Paralympic Games received AU$10 per student; Those who were ‘beyond 400km’ category received AU$20; Those in the ‘beyond 1000km’ category received AU$40; Those who were more than 2,000 km away or in Tasmania received AU$100 and those who are more than 3,000 km away received AU$200.

Schools could also take advantage of the Day Pass system, which was adapted from large resorts and theme parks and could choose which sports or events could be attended. The value of the Day Pass was AU$15 per person and each student paid half, which was AU$8.As an incentive for their participation, schools that completed the LEAP program had access to advance purchase of daily passes and had a different condition for purchasing them. For every 100 passes sold, each school received another 10 free passes as a bonus. the federal government and SPOC encouraged schools to use these bonus passes for parents, teachers or coordination assistants to accompany their students to the games. Children under five do not pay for any type of day pass and they were admitted with any type of fee.

"As many Australian children as possible should witness the Sydney 2000 Paralympic Games — our athletes are among the best in the world. Our children should be encouraged to experience first hand the triumph of our athletes who overcome their disabilities to excel." The Federal Minister for Sport and Tourism, Jackie Kelly upon announcing the LEAP Subsidy.

Following the LEAP program, the organising committee selected approximately 900 students from 120 participating schools to assist authorities and security forces during the award ceremonies. Their duties included carrying trays containing flower bouquets and medals. The students were from Year Five and Year Six and were aged between 10 and 12 in 2000.

On 29 February 2000, SPOC announced that the number of schools involved in LEAP exceeded more than 2000 institutions involved in all Australian states and territories. Applications for the LEAP scholarship ended on 30 April 2000, and had no cost for the schools involved and covered all types of primary and secondary school institutions. By that date, approximately 272 LEAP participating schools in 5 states had purchased approximately 80,000 Day Passes.

=== Paralympic Voice ===
As part of the educational program, the SPOC also developed a program of lectures and face-to-face actions called Paralympic Voice, which had several similarities to LEAP. But now it was developed with companies, commercial and community associations and other types of institutions. In this case, in addition to the possibility of communications and exchange of previous experiences, Paralympic athletes and other partners could visit these institutions in person through lectures and other institutional events when available.

== Public reception ==
The incidents that happened before Atlanta forced Australian organisers to rethink the way in which the Paralympic Games would be promoted, and this involved work related to local communities and across the country. A big novelty was the development of a marketing campaign in which the issue of disability was abandoned and there was a focus on the trajectory of each athlete, and this ended up resulting in something unprecedented, as around more than 1 million people were present in the Olympic Park during the games, namely some 340,000 basic education students. Public and private schools were provided with free day tickets for students and teachers to attend, as a conclusion for the schools' education project which ran before the games. This was also the result of the involvement from a diverse range of areas and groups from the third sector.

=== Volunteers ===
As they were jointly managing several areas, SOCOG and SPOC were also responsible for joint management of the volunteer program resulting in a total number of more than 62.000 volunteers who were divided between the Olympic Games and the Paralympic Games themselves.

Training for this gigantic number of the volunteers, contractors and headquarters staff working during the Olympic and Paralympic Games was totally integrated and involved specific actions for people with disabilities. Those actions were developed by TAFE NSW tasking Team and included a focus on disability awareness. In the period before the games, TAFENSW was a reference in Australia on the issue of Education and Training of People with Disabilities or Learning Difficulties (VET). At the time, around 6000 students were part of the VET program. In order to complement these efforts, SOCOG's internal training team, which was made up of employees from the Olympic Organizing Committee and TAFE NSW, were complemented by other outstanding employees from TAFE NSW. However, now with specific knowledge and experience in the VET area.

=== Service clubs ===
Part of the local community involvement program also took place in the third sector through service clubs or associations. In this group were Rotary International, Apex Clubs of Australia, Lions Clubs International, Freemasonry, Soroptimist International and Zonta International worked together with the SPOC on projects to send groups of spectators. It is noteworthy that they also helped finance the logistics so that schools and socially vulnerable groups could go to venues during the games. Another groups such as Probus Clubs and Legacy Australia were encouraged to take actions and led their members to the be present at the games. These actions also encompassed national scout and guide groups across Australia. As part of the education programs, they also received training about the Paralympic Games and their families also participated in the entire process, which culminated in active participation in several actions that took place in Sydney during the games.

=== Multiculturalism ===
Just like the Olympic Games, the issue of multiculturalism in Australia was part of the planning of actions related to the Paralympic Games. Alongside SOCOG, SPOC developed several actions related to these delicate issues. This led to encouraging links between Australian ethnic groups and the visitors from other countries. And these communities worked alongside the organisation to reach a new level of spectator support, raise funds and also provide a specific group of volunteers specialised in translation.

=== Spheres of local government ===
All spheres of federal, state and local government in Australia contributed to help and held the financial and promotional support to the Paralympic Games. It was observed that the effort regarding education programs also involved councilors, mayors, members of the state and federal parliaments and also the respective residents locals who also helped SPOC raise funds for the games.

== Fundraising and partnerships ==
A number of connections and partnerships were made in unique ways, and valuable Special Projects were made with particulars, business, professional and industrial groups. The main focus along the fundraising actions and raising awareness among the Australian population to help to raise the necessary financial amounts in the final stretch of preparations for the games. As the games approached this list was progressively increased to the point that in the final remainder this number reached almost 45 partners and sponsors and, in many cases, sponsorships related to the Olympic Games were expanded. This is a list of those who first got involved with the financing actions.

=== Partnerships program ===
The Paralympic Partnerships Fund was a unique program that offered individuals, organisations, trusts and foundations, local councils, community groups and associations the opportunity to make a tax-deductible specific and abrangente donation towards the successful staging of the Sydney 2000 Paralympic Games, started at amounts above AUS$3,000 and were made appropriately and in proportion to the donated amounts made at various levels, from framed certificates and lapel pins to VIP status during the games. On the shared list were Telstra, IBM, supermarket chain Franklins which was responsible for the exclusive sale of licensed products from the Paralympic Games, Westpac, AMP, Bonds which supplied the uniforms for the volunteers and also various products licensees EnergyAustralia, Ansett Australia as the international logistics partner, Fuji Xerox, John Fairfax & Sons, Swatch Group and Coca-Cola Amatil. On the list of exclusive sponsors were 2UE, Otto Bock, Shell and Boise Cascade. The following were already on the list of suppliers Woolcott Research, Rogen and Gerflor.

=== Seniors Card NSW ===
One of these partnerships was with Seniors Card NSW (which is an institutional elderly benefit card from the state of New South Wales). Creating a specific fundraising program called "One Million Smiles", committing to raising an amount over more than AUD$1 million in small charitable actions. This partnership was also responsible for guaranteeing the registration of more than 10,000 potential volunteers.

=== Quilts 2000 ===
Some of Australia's best and largest quilt makers have embarked on a project involving potentially more than 40,000 people who have created specific designs to be sold at auctions or other events to raise funds for the Paralympics. In total, around 650 quilts were made and displayed in all major Australian cities with around 50 being sold in the pre-sale process raising around AUD$50,000. The mayor of the Paralympic Village, former prime minister Tim Fischer, announced that 60 of them were chosen to be displayed in the offices and international zone areas of the village during the Olympic and Paralympic Games within a decision that made sense, as these were the two busiest areas during both events.

=== St. Andrew's Student Business Club ===
Between 1999 and 2000, the Student Business Club of St Andrew's Cathedral, Sydney School organised a number of activities to raise more than AUD$100,000 for the Paralympic Games, organising an annual Celebrity Golf Day and a series of Gala Dinners and Auctions.

=== Participation of contractors ===
Another partnership developed was with the joint venture between the Transfield Holdings and the French company Bouygues, which was responsible for the construction of Airport Link, Sydney and the Sydney Harbour Tunnel supported the Paralympic Games through public fundraising events at various public and private events. They also purchased some sponsorship shares months before the games.

=== NSWM Real Estate Institute (REI) ===
NSW real estate agents were encouraged by REI to consolidate their annual fundraising initiatives and this led to some groups to sending part of these funds to the management of the Paralympic Games. A number of additional fundraising initiatives and games involvement opportunities were promoted by REI in the run-up to the games.

=== Holy Grail: The official album ===
Another initiative that helped to finance the games was the sale of the official album called "Holy Grail" and which was released on 18 October 1999, exactly one year before the opening ceremony. This album is a compilation of several songs that inspired Australia's Paralympic athletes to achieve their greatest triumphs. The main goal of this album is to highlight and promote the Paralympic Games (held in Sydney, 18–29 October 2000) through the entertainment industry, as well as fundraising for the Paralympic Games. The concept of an official Paralympic Games CD was brought to Warner Music Australia by a member of the 2000 Paralympic Ceremonies Production Team, Michael Chugg, as part of an inclusive idea to consult with Australian athletes regarding those songs that inspired and motivated them. During the release of the album, Chugg mentioned that Louise Sauvage had chosen a song by Jimmy Barnes, called "No second prize". In addition to the two official themes of the games "Being Here" by Graeme Connors and "Dots on the shells" performed by Yothu Yindi and Jim Kerr. Ten of Australia's champion Paralympians have each chosen a piece of music which reflects their pride in the games and their passion in performing. It is an emotion shared by the artists who perform their song. The CD was available at all Australian record stores and a percentage from each CD sold was go towards staging the Sydney 2000 Paralympic Games. Songs by Hunters & Collectors, Van Halen, Barenaked Ladies, The Whitlams, Cold Chisel, Richard Clapton, Icehouse, Pretenders, The Superjesus, Marie Wilson, Marcia Hines and Goanna are part of this soundtrack.

== Transport and logistics operations ==
Logistics management during the 1996 Summer Paralympic Games were a big disaster and were a key result of the lack of collaboration between the organisers, the city of Atlanta and the Georgia state government. As the services did not communicate with each other, this led to huge traffic jams and other problems during competitions. In Atlanta, the majority of venues were outside the Olympic Ring and very far from the Paralympic Village. Since the bid projects, Sydney treated this issue in a different way, which practically transformed this issue into something much calmer and easier. As 20 of the 25 competition venues were all practically centralised in the same region neighbouring the Paralympic Village, Paralympic athletes could reach them on foot or by their wheels. In this way the joint planning from the beginning ended the possibilities of different logistics for the two events, leading the reduction of these operations.

However, the distances between the Homebush Bay precinct to the Sydney Airport, the city Downtown and the most populated neighbourhoods and their suburbs. Ended up leading to the expansion of the actions of the Sydney Olympic Transport and Roads Authority (SORTA), which also assumed the responsibilities of planning, managing and executing all logistics activities during the two events. SORTA was responsible for developing specific and differentiated actions for each one. Among this group was the hiring of 27 buses adapted to transport the blind and wheelchair athletes during the Paralympics in the daily routes between the airport and the Paralympic Village and also those competition and tourist and other sites further away from the games epicentre. In addition to the roads management and the logistic operations during the games, SORTA was also owned the responsibility to monitor, organise and prepare all transport routes that would take the public to watch the events. This involved cars, buses, the subway and surface trains, since most of the public arrived during the games using the Olympic Park railway line stations.

== Political context ==
=== Ceremonies ===
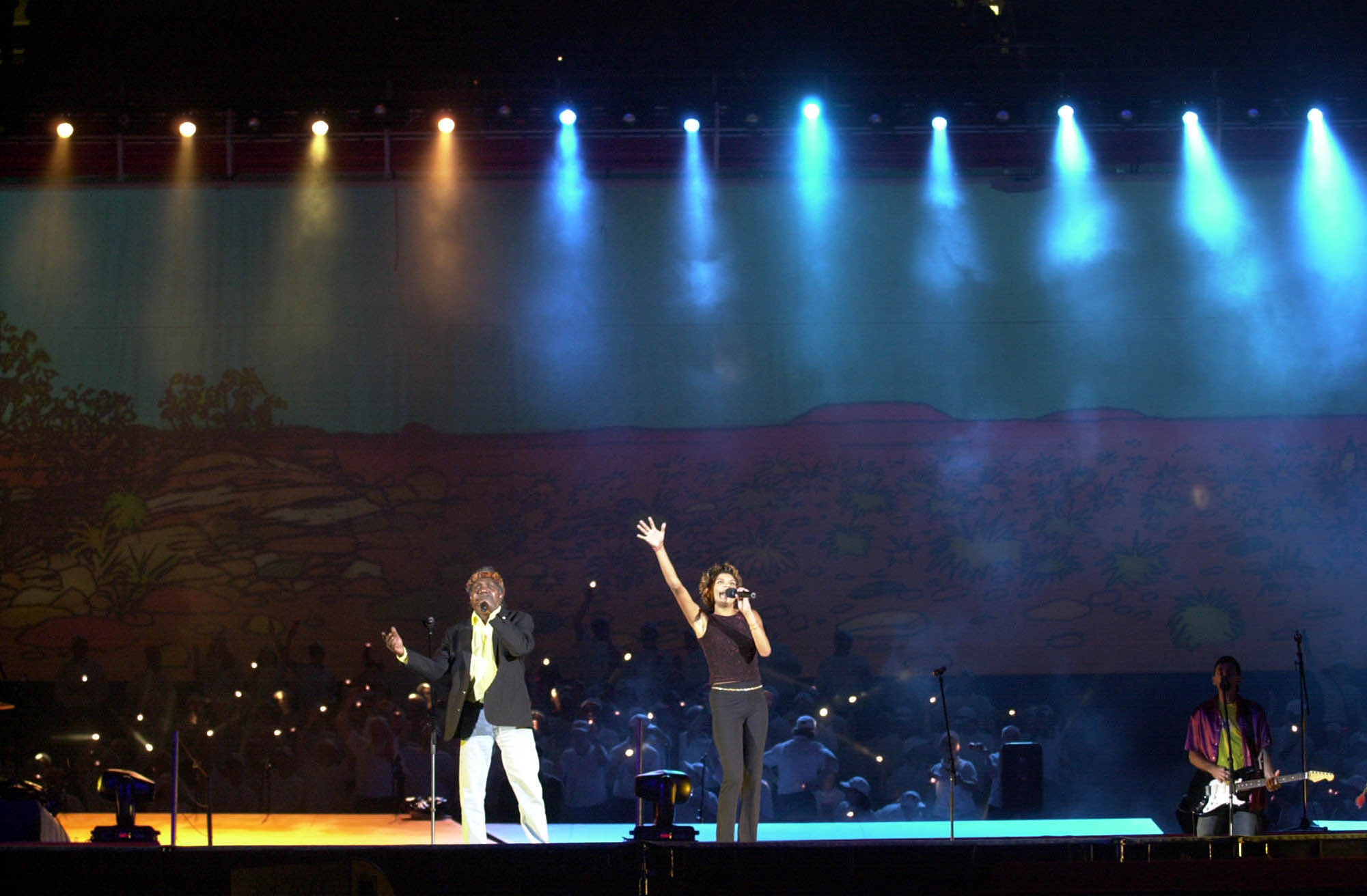
Yothu Yindi performs at the Sydney opening ceremony.

With a few months to go until the opening ceremony, SOCOG was taken by surprise in May 2000, when they found out behind the scenes that the pop diva Kylie Minogue and group Yothu Yindi were going to headline the Paralympic opening ceremonies. Somewhat indirectly, the presence of Kylie and the group caused some embarrassment to the producers of the Olympic ceremonies who decided at the last minute to invite them to perform at their ceremonies.

But, at the same time that this was happening, it was already public knowledge that Kylie would not be in Australia during the first week of the Olympic Games, as she would be in Europe that week fulfilling her schedule related to the release of her most recent album. Light Years album scheduled for the upcoming week and would not have time to get to Sydney before the ceremony. While the group carried out its concert schedule normally. In return, Kylie and the group agreed to participate in the closing ceremony where they performed two performances as a form of compensation.

=== Transition period ===
Despite five years of mediation and collaboration by the Olympic Coordination Authority (OCA), relations between the two Organizing Committees strained in the so-called transition period between the two events that lasted 16 days (2 to 18 October 2000). Led by OCA, there is a common commitment to make Sydney 2000 a joint-success. But, after the Olympics closing ceremonies, some attitudes on the part of some Olympic authorities caused a lot of embarrassment to the locals. A few hours after the end of the Olympic Games, SOCOG and Sydney City Council announced in a joint statement that the giant Olympic rings that were hanging on the Harbour Bridge during the 16-day Olympic Games would be immediately removed. This decision ended up overshadowing the ritual of lighting the Paralympic fire at the gardens of Australian Parliament Hill in Canberra. that would take place days later. A few hours later, the chairman of SOCOG, Michael Knight, that he would no longer participate in all those public events that were related to the Paralympic Games. To the public opinion, this decision was frowned upon and was also seen as an insensitive, authoritarian, and self-centred attitude in being also seen as a retaliation for some actions by the Paralympics organisation that "ended up attracting more attention than the organization of the Olympic Games". Hours after this announcement, SOCOG scheduled a party for 17 October as a way of celebrating the help of volunteers in making the 2000 Summer Olympic Games a success. However, this chosen date clashed with the date on which the Paralympic torch would arrive in Sydney and refused to re-mark this celebration.

== Controversies ==
=== Spanish Basketball ID team ===
The Sydney 2000 Paralympic Games were marred by a scandal which saw Intellectual Disability athletes removed from the next two Summer Paralympics. Fernando Vicente Martin, former head of the Spanish Federation for Mentally Handicapped Sports, allowed athletes without disabilities to compete at the games in order to win the biggest possible number of gold medals. The distrust regarding this issue began during the first games of the Basketball ID tournament when some of the players' gestures, postures and behaviours did not match the type of disability they claimed to have. It was claimed that at least 10 of the 12 Spanish players had no disability, rather were recruited to improve the team's performance and guarantee future funding. Martin was later suspended by the IPC and expelled by the Spanish Paralympic Committee. The ID athletes were quickly exposed and after some studies, the International Paralympic Committee decided that starting at the 2002 Winter Paralympics which were scheduled for Salt Lake City, Utah. events for ID athletes were removed from the program. This decision was overturned in 2009, allowing a return to the games at the 2012 Summer Paralympics.

Along with the controversies surrounding the Spanish basketball team. Sydney recorded the highest number of positive doping cases in the history of the Paralympics to date. Out of 630 tests carried out, 11 athletes tested positive.

=== Lack of host broadcaster ===
During a series of events held to mark the two-year countdown to the games,between October and November 1998 and the launch of mascot Lizzie, the IPC authorities demonstrated their enthusiasm with what was being seen, since for the first time in 6 years integration between the Olympic and Paralympic Organizations was seen, but one specific issue was worrying the Paralympic authorities: the lack of a host broadcaster and domestic television partner in Australia. During this series of events, the then president of the IPC, Dr. Robert Steadward, praised most of the preparations for the games, but expressed several concerns about the lack of a host broadcaster as "the contract relating to this theme had not been signed". As the Sydney Olympic Broadcasting Organisation (SOBO) had this competence in the Olympic Games, there was no company with the same competence in the Paralympic Games.

Dr Steadward stated about the theme: "It is our great concern [the lack of a host broadcaster]." "As I understand it, they [the Sydney organisers] are still negotiating, they are hopeful that by or before the end of this calendar year they should have an answer on the situation of television support for the Games."

Which according to Steadward, the lack of a host broadcaster "could turn the Games coverage a difficult matter and could alienate the interest of audiences around the world. "Without a host broadcaster, interested television networks will have to send their own crews or pay local crews to generate footage and cover a limited range of events, which would be a much more expensive and laborious task."

Between 1996 and 1999, SPOC had been negotiating host broadcaster duties with Channel 7 and the other free-to-air Australian broadcasters in the hope of securing a deal to act as host broadcaster and domestic partner during the games, but had so far been unable to secure a deal or meet several self-imposed deadlines. For Steadward, this was a latent preoccupation "The lack of broadcasters would greatly reduce the number of local and international coverage of the Paralympic Games and would frustrate one of the main objectives of holding the event", said Steadward in the same press conference. "The problem was not only making sure Australians got the chance to see their Paralympic athletes on television". "It is one thing to make sure Australians are fully cognisant of what's happening to their athletes, but the French, Germans, Swedes and the Canadians and many other countries are interested in sending back a feed on what's happening to their athletes as well, and it is in our best interests that we do have that television information. Dr Steadward also said "that the problem was not new and that the lack of sponsors for the Paralympics was making it difficult for organisers to find the funds to pay a network to act as host broadcaster. This could cost between $5 million and $10 million". However, he said he was "very, very pleased" with Sydney's preparations. "There are no problems from our point of view," he said. He was also surprised by the level of excellence seen in Sydney and praised the cooperation between SOCOG and SPOC, prophesying what could happen from then on in the next editions, such as the unification of the organisation of the two events, as Salt Lake City was doing for the 2002 Winter Games and Athens, which was already preparing in the same way for 2004. "I could not be happier. I have not seen better cooperation between the organising committee and the IPC. I'm very pleased with that aspect."

Two months later, exactly on 8 December 1999, Ms Louis Appleby, the then executive chairwoman of the SPOC revealed during another press conference "that negotiations with Channel 7 had collapsed because of an indecent proposal made by the station's directors. The proposal from Channel 7's board of directors was that none of the Sydney Paralympic Games events would be broadcast live on free-to-air television". Instead, "Seven proposed airing a one-hour "best of each day" summary at 11pm and then re-running the program on its pay-TV network the following day. Even the ceremonies would not be broadcast live." In the absence of available options, this proposal could be considered the only viable one by the SPOC board, But Appleby stated on the same day, "The Seven idea was well below the level we expected for a host broadcaster".

"SPOC had been searching for a broadcast host for over 12 months at this point, but had been unable to persuade any network to produce the main event footage so that it would not be exclusively for the Australian market but for the rest of the world". "The Channel 7's proposal was well below what SPOC itself expected from a host broadcaster and would level the Games coverage much lower than what had been done in Atlanta and Barcelona". She also made public her dissatisfaction with what this proposal would be. Seven wanted to use individual cameras for each event while the use of multi-cameras and the broadcaster vans, what is normal for events of this size, would be exclusive to the opening and closing ceremonies, but for none of the competitions". "Also, the single-camera coverage would inevitably focus on the Australian delegation, which would also result in low interest and audience in another countries. "Those foreign networks that were interested now also faced the prospect of sending their own crews to cover their own delegations, which would inevitably increase the costs for them and could and can also drive them away." The issue of broadcasting the Paralympics was complicated for Seven, as the broadcaster had purchased the broadcast rights to the 1996 Summer Games, with high expectations, as the next Games were scheduled for Australia, but which were frustrated throughout the broadcast, resulting in low demand for sponsors and an audience far below expectations, resulting in a gigantic net loss. When a round of negotiations was initiated, the broadcaster's directors asked for financial guarantees of more than AUD$3 million "in case they did not achieve the expected number of sponsorship quotas sold until the start of the Games". Ms Appleby said they were "very happy" "with the proposal, although there were concerns including "money... and the television time". She said SPOC "was still negotiating the cash values, but that they certainly weren't planning to spend money to buy time on a station".

The announcement of the host broadcaster was made at the Sydney 2000 Olympic and Paralympic Games World Broadcaster Meeting held on 14 September 1999. For the Paralympic Host broadcaster the joint venture composed by the local companies Global Television and All Media Sports acted on this functions. SPOC has also appointed a London-based Media Content, PLC as the exclusive world-wide (excluding Australia) TV rights sales agent for the Sydney 2000 Paralympic Games. The announcement was made at the Sydney 2000 Olympic and Paralympic Games World Broadcaster Meeting.

In December 1999, the public Australian broadcaster proposed ABC to be the SPOC domestic television partner was accepted. What influenced SPOC's decision to accept ABC's proposal were the previous experiences around the Paralympic Sport since 1988. Their television coverage included 96 hours of live action, with 2 hours live during the weekdays and a huge coverage during the weekend with more than 20 hours. Every day around 12 million Australians watched this unprecedented coverage during 17 days. The opening and closing ceremonies became the highest-rated shows in the channel's history, surpassing those recorded during the same events at the 1982 Commonwealth Games.The broadcaster's coverage was not restricted to television, a specific and innovative website was created to cover the games. Quizzes were published on it and the results were updated in real time.

== Media coverage ==
Despite having completely different rights owners, the relationship between the SOCOG and the SPOC resulted in providing an improved media coverage the Olympics and Paralympics. For the first time, the media services and operations were planned together for the two events, in an action that expanded the potential reach of both events to never-before-seen proportions. The use of the same facilities within the proportions of each event made the work easier. It is clear that the deactivated part of the MMC was converted into a venue during the Paralympics. Something completely opposite to what happened four years earlier in Atlanta. Implying clear changes in the form and size of coverage of the Paralympic Games.

The table below give some information about the staff work at the Media Centre at the Olympics and Paralympics respectively:

	Total number	Peak shift number
Paid	114 Olympics 70 Paralympics	114 Olympics 70 Paralympics
Volunteers	1113 Olympics 253 Paralympics	340 Olympics 80 Paralympics
Contractors	1078 Olympics 223 Paralympics	490 Olympics 70 Paralympics

The Main Media Center (MMC) reopened on 11 October 2000, and operated 24 hours a day until the 30th of the same month. Coupled with the MMC was a research and information office, including a library operated by the SOCOG Communications offices. Some volunteers of the Centre for Olympic Studies at the University of New South Wales also worked in some functions. WeMedia also provided internet and the coverage of the games and was a sponsor and partner of the Sydney Paralympics. During the games, WeMedia had 300 staff operating in the MMC. The Australian official broadcaster of the games ABC, had a comparatively smaller team of 30 for its television coverage.

Also in the table below, the approximate number of accredited media at the Paralympic Summer Games from 1992 to 2008 has been listed.

Approximate number of accredited media personnel at the Paralympics
Games location	Number
Barcelona	1500
Atlanta	2000
Sydney	2400
Athens	3100
Beijing	5700

The Canadian Broadcasting Corporation had approximately 200 staff in Sydney for the Olympic Games, 6 people in strategic positions remained in Sydney to manage coverage of the Paralympic Games. Along the live coverage the Canadian Broadcasting Corporation aired four one-hour shows of the Paralympic Games after the event was finished.

Also with live coverage, TVNZ aired four one-hour specials of the event after their ending.

In the United States, CBS broadcast a special called Role Models for the 21st Century: The Sydney 2000 Paralympic Games. The special was two hours long and aired two weeks after the games ending.

The British Broadcasting Corporation (BBC) who made a special coverage, allowed their viewers the opportunity to express their opinions towards the games. Comments were posted under the heading "Has the Sydney Paralympics been a success?" on their website. One viewer, Carole Neale from England, was cited as posting: "I am so disappointed to find the coverage limited to less than an hour per evening, on at a time when most people are still travelling home from work, and dismissed to BBC2, unlike the Olympics which had a prime time evening slot on BBC1 as well as constant live coverage".

== Visual identity ==
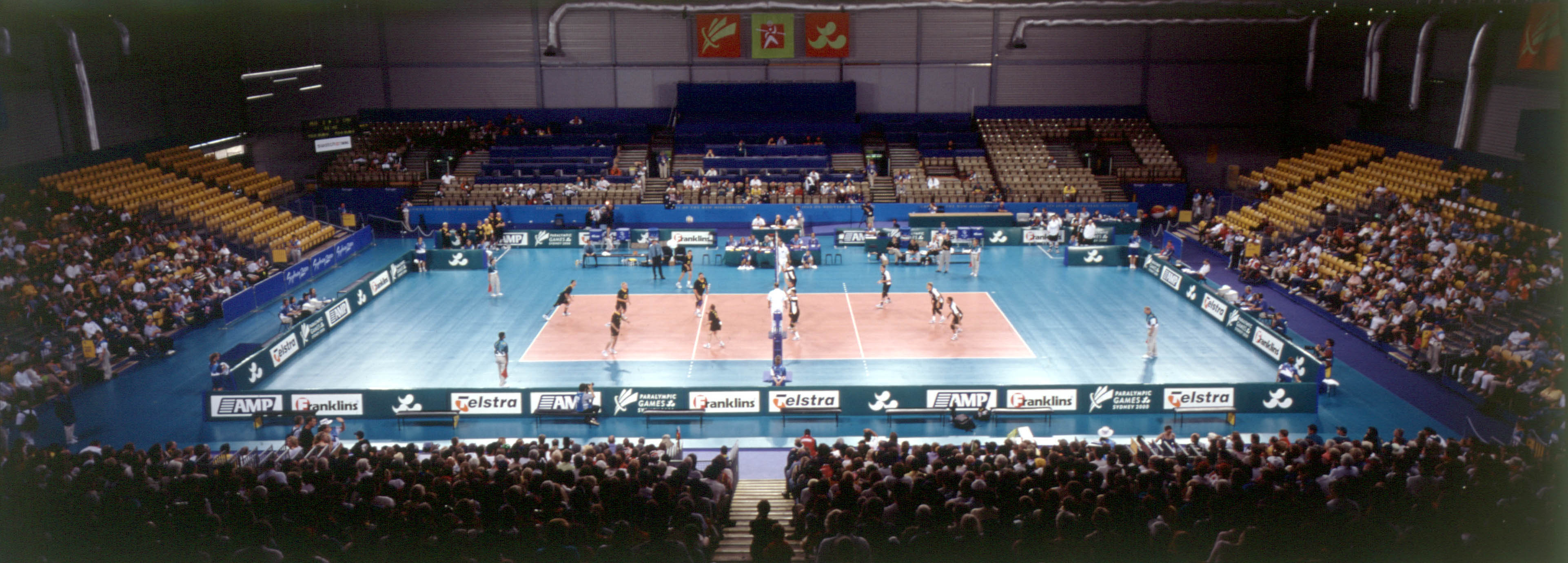
This is the Look of the games application during the standing volleyball tournament.

Despite all the approximation and development in common through the development of shared actions the two events had different visual and corporate identities. As some editions before, this led a confusion due to the hard differentiation of colour palettes, logos and other secondary characteristics, and led to the creation of different group to develop the Paralympic Look of the games. As the Olympic Games, this group was responsible for providing a decoration, wayfinding and a common mark and identification program for some 20 competition venues, five major non-competition venues, the Sydney Olympic Park (SOP), and the touristic and common places in Sydney and Parramatta. However, this group operated on an extremely very smaller budget and different conditions than its Olympic counterpart. This led in actions that led to the maximum reuse of several elements that were used during the Olympic Games as they were made by cardboards or another types of recyclable materials. However, one day after the Olympics closing ceremonies, an audit started to see which each materials were in condition to be reused and could not be discarded. Thus, huge number of plaques and kits of parts could be recovered or kept. That those that were discarded were replaced by the Paralympic brand/identity along the specific graphics. Thus, those elements in which the "Sydney 2000" brand was used were maintained, with a view to maintaining the festive atmosphere experienced at the Olympic Games and also to demonstrate the common values of the two events. The aim was to give the venues a fresh and specific Paralympic identity, while maintaining the atmosphere of festivity and a similar level of presentation as the Olympic Games.

=== Overlay time ===
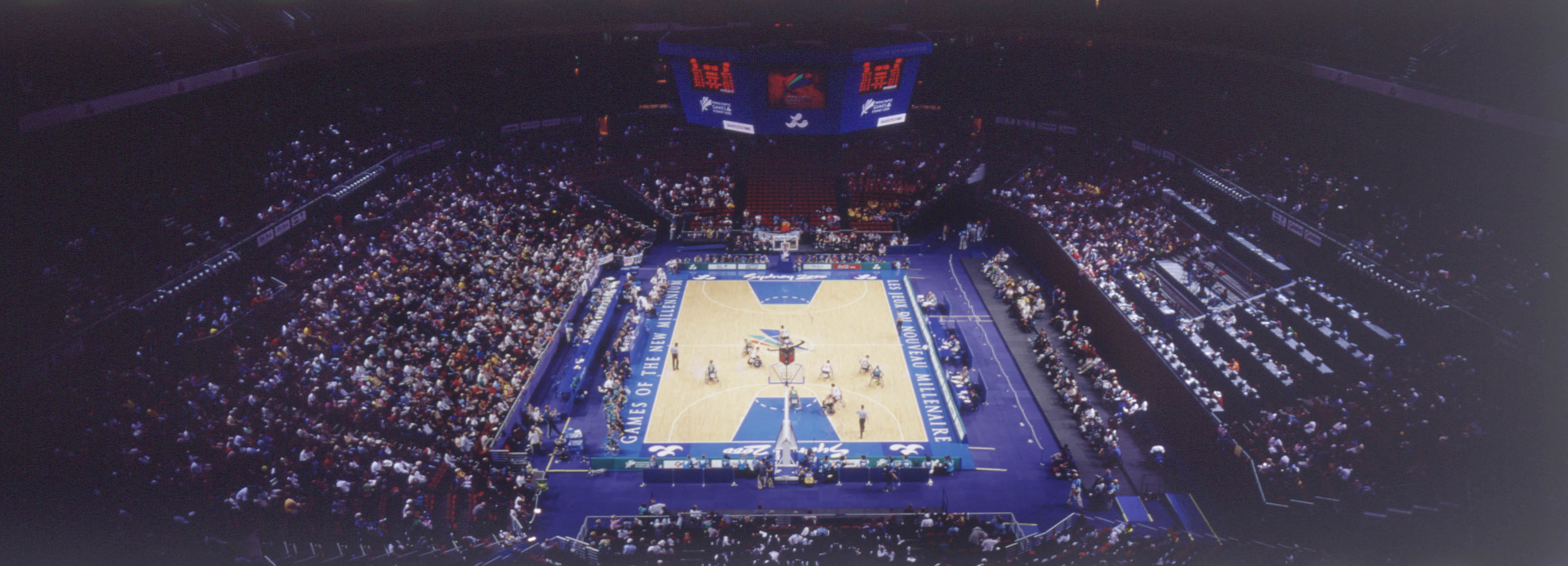
Panoramic view inside the Sydney Superdome during wheelchair basketball competition at the 2000 Sydney Paralympic Games.

The headaches experienced in Atlanta about the visual identities of the Olympic and Paralympic Games and resulted in a series of numerous problems and lawsuits and a lack of identification and differentiation by athletes, local communities and spectators. Due to these issues, for the first time a games overlay program was developed.

Between 1997 and 1999 a specific and totally different visual identity for the Paralympics was developed, but due to the approximation and fusion of the common areas of the two events through the OCA added to budgetary issues on both sides ended up causing the fusion of many graphic elements.An example of this integration was the creation of eight new specific paralympic sporting pictograms. Another integration in common was the use of the blue colour, the mark "Sydney 2000" and the "fluid energy" graphics. However, with new elements now in Paralympics logo colours. A survey with managers of competitions and arenas about possible changes in the visual identity during the Paralympics. The vast majority opted for maintaining the one used during the Olympics. However, minor changes had to be made in almost all marks and elements on all playing fields and information boards, which gave the impression that the two events were part of the same. Only in drastic cases, such as the three basketball and wheelchair rugby arenas, there was a need to change the floors of the courts that had the Olympic Logo at the center of courts.

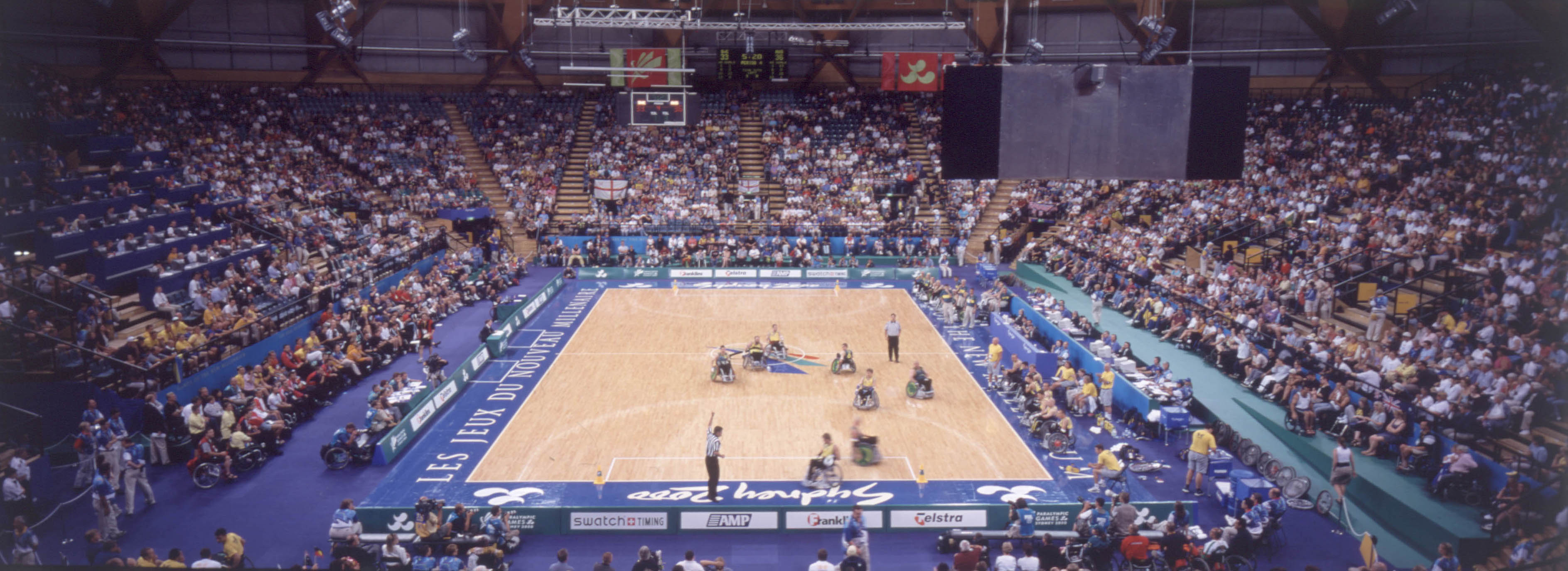
Panoramic view inside the Sydney Dome during wheelchair rugby competition at the 2000 Sydney Paralympic Games.

The solution for the changes of marks was simple due to the low budget used. That brands that could be not replaced were covered with stickers in which the SOCOG and IOC brands were covered by the SPOC and IPC brands, lowering costs. Another plan was relocating the elements that were in good condition to be used to other areas. For this action, a list of priority locations was created, based on the profile of each sport and also on their maintenance costs. On average, each received AUD$5.000, with the most expensive amount invested in the Olympic Stadium being AUD$80,000. The original values were downsized due to the reusing of most of the visual aspects of the Olympic Games, which were mostly made of recycled fabrics, cardboard and other flexible materials. Soon after adjustments, the final requirements were made in some specific and common festive areas, who were made after the execution of Olympic conversion and the technical-operational requirements, they were handed over to the respective operational managers. The planning also managed to produce results in the 5 venues outside the Sydney Olympic Park that managed to fully maintain the visual elements of the Olympic Games and also received others that came from other locations and that in some cases there was a need to cover Olympic symbols and change the brands. However, the Olympic Park became a problem during the event conversion period. In order for their Paralympic mode to be implemented and executed a last moment. Nearly 2/3 of the plates and identification signs were removed in its conversion in an intention to facilitate the operations during the Paralympics. Due to this discard, new materials had to be printed or created.

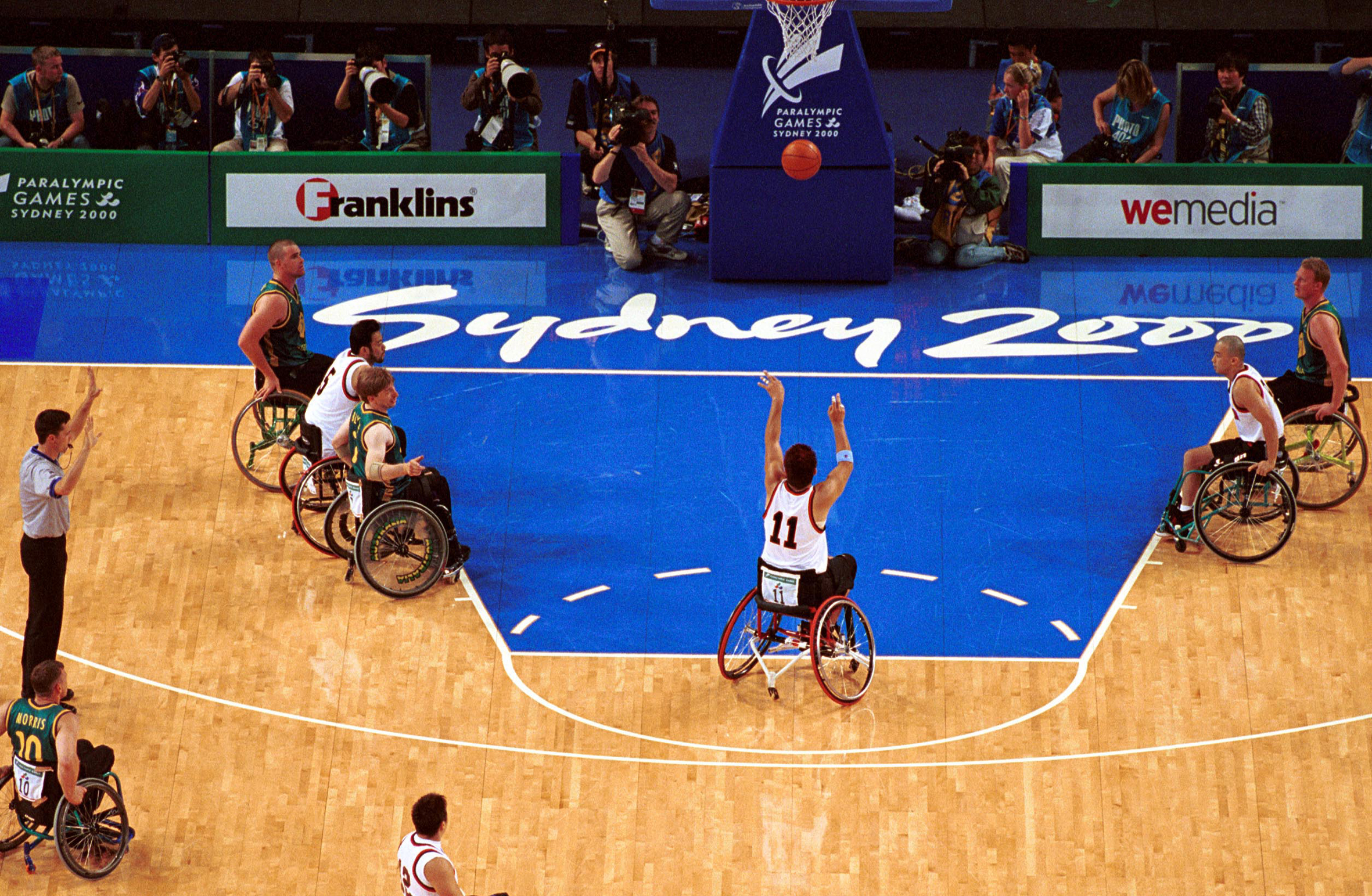
An example of the mixed use of the Olympics and Paralympics Marks.

=== Logo ===
The Sydney 2000 Summer Paralympics logo and Paralympic torch were developed by marketing agency FHA Image Design from Melbourne and went public on 18 October 1996, four years before the opening ceremony, in a special event held at the Sydney Harbour Bridge.It is observed that despite being initially different visual identities, Sydney's Olympic and Paralympic identities complement each other and are personified by the same elements and graphic traces.

The Victorian agency was already involved with all the visual planning for both the Olympics and the Paralympics and unified several visual elements of the two events such as the pictograms, the street signals and the trademarks under the name of "Sydney 2000". The 2000 Summer Paralympic Games logo was a representative of a dynamic human form leaping triumphantly forward and 'breaking through' towards the games.

The logo came to life, three years after its launch, with the announcement of the Paralympic torch that it was in fact the Paralympic spirit in action. As the visual identity of the event that was focused on the energy dissipated by the Paralympic athletes. It represented the energy dissipated by a paralympic athlete when "breaking a barrier" or a "wall of bricks, concrete or glass". This is also reflected in the Paralympic fire and the spirit, composed at the time by the motto of "body, mind and spirit".

Another image that can be seen in it is the Paralympic torch that is in a handover position for the next carrier with inspiring views to the world and the future with the use of Futura Typeface to write the games with the host city's and host year's names. The host's unique characteristics are seen in the fact that it also refers to the Sydney Opera House and Sydney Harbour with its sea and the boats through the use of three exclusive graphic shapes who refer to this feature. The agency developed unique tones of the 3 colours of the Paralympic flag to represent unique characteristics of the host country: the ocean blue represented the two oceans that bathe Australia (the Indian Ocean and the Pacific Ocean), the warm red of the Outback and a lush forest green which represent the Australia's endemic plants and animal species. The logo also embodies the host city vitality, Australia's spirit, and the achievements of a Paralympic athlete.

=== Ticket design ===
The comprehensive signage strategy, a design application specifically for the Paralympic Games, was fully connected to ticket design and layout and used a much simpler visual system, based on the games logo, where the graphics were much larger.

== Invincible Summer: Paralympic Arts Festival ==
As Atlanta and Nagano, Sydney had a Cultural Paralympiad. This arts festival was curated by local celebrity Leo Schofield. During this event, a film festival with giant inflable ducks, aerial acrobatics and dances in the middle of the street, giant puppets, giant dancing cows and singing sharks, Senegalese drummers and syncopated Australian singers raised the level of excitement at Sydney Olympic Park during the games. This program, which was considered innovative, began on 20 October 2000 with a Paralympic Games Gala Concert at the Sydney Opera House. With participation of the Sea 2000 Choir and a notable theater and dance program involving artists with disabilities around the world at the University of Sydney's Seymour Theater Centre.

Spread across the city, several visual arts exhibitions are held, with multimedia experiences, visitors were able to experience works of art from the United States, France, Mexico, United Kingdom, Sweden, Brazil, Vietnam, Japan, Egypt and the Czech Republic, as well as one of the main artistic main names in Australia.

== Ceremonies ==
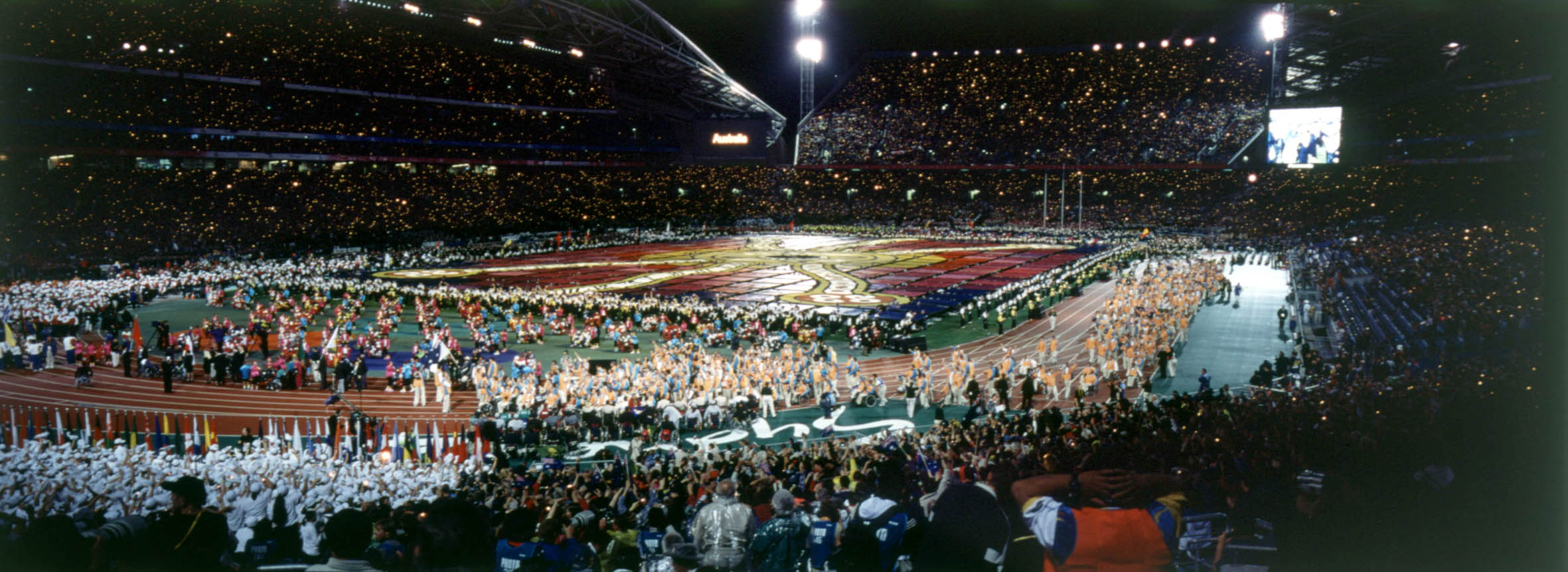
The Australian team at the opening ceremony

=== Opening ceremonies ===
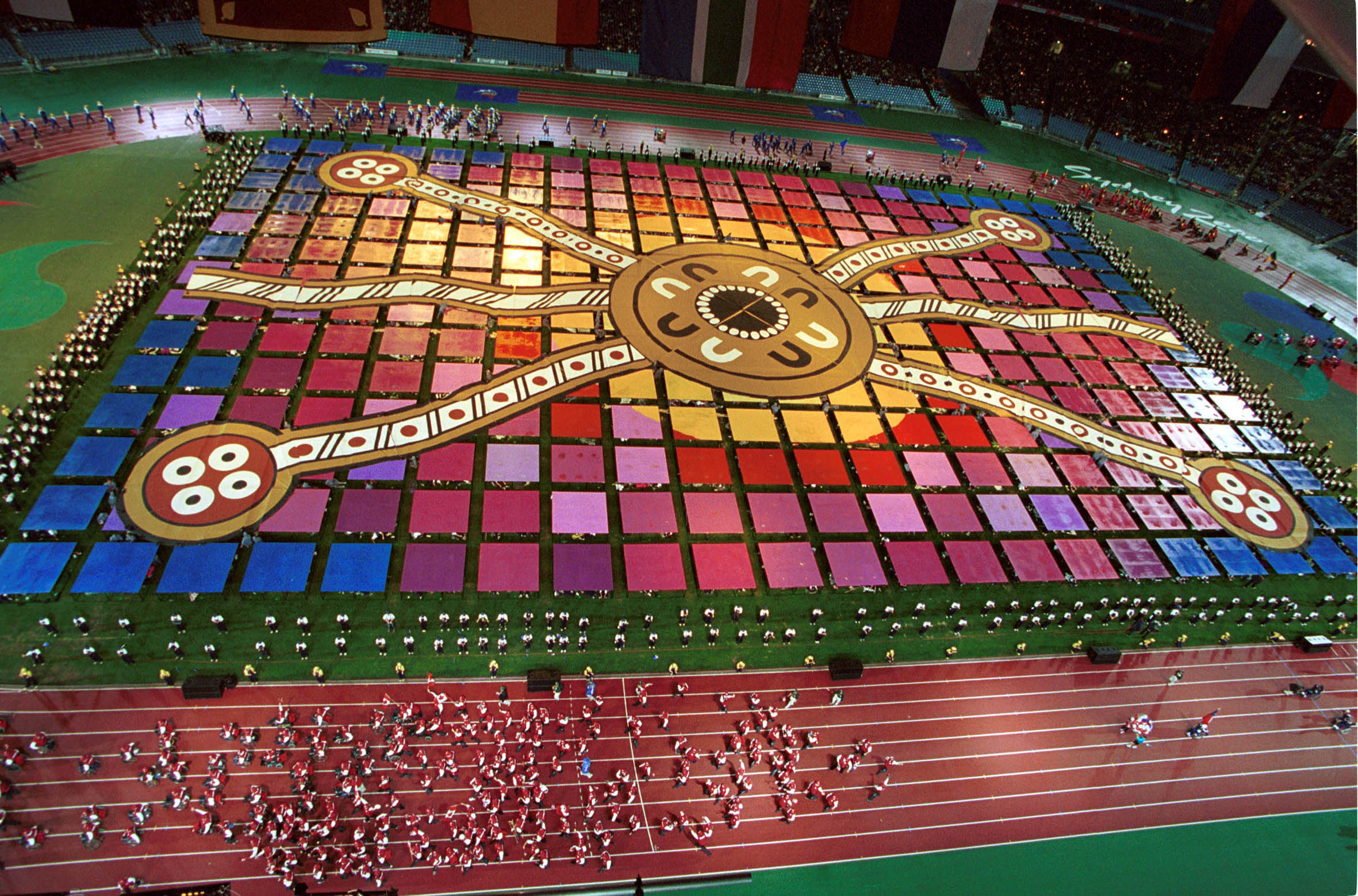
Aerial view towards the centrepiece of Opening Ceremony of the 2000 Summer Paralympics, a giant Bronwyn Bancroft drawn representing an Aboriginal meeting place was painted live during the Parade of Nations.

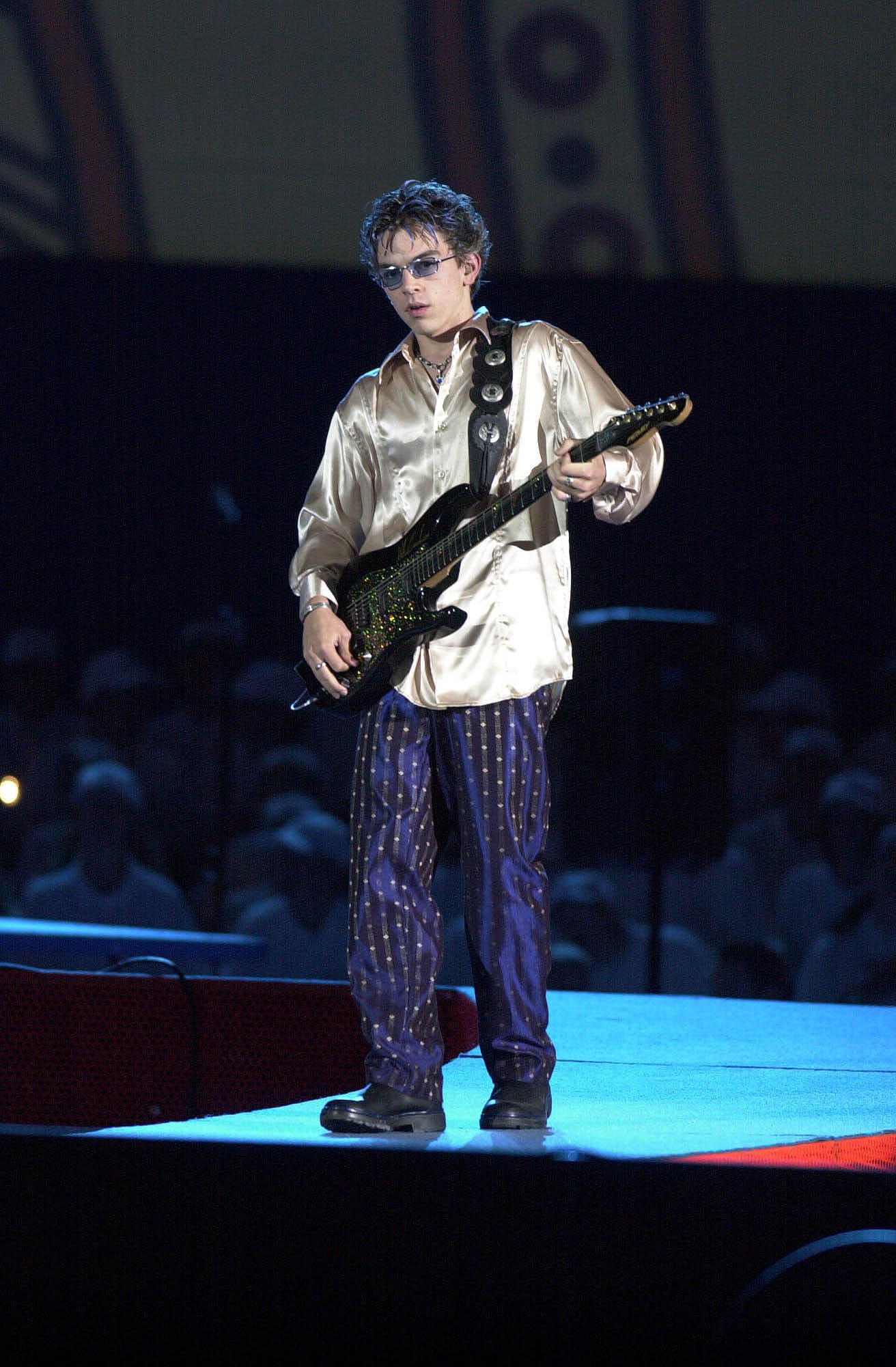
Nathan Cavaleri performing during the Opening Ceremony

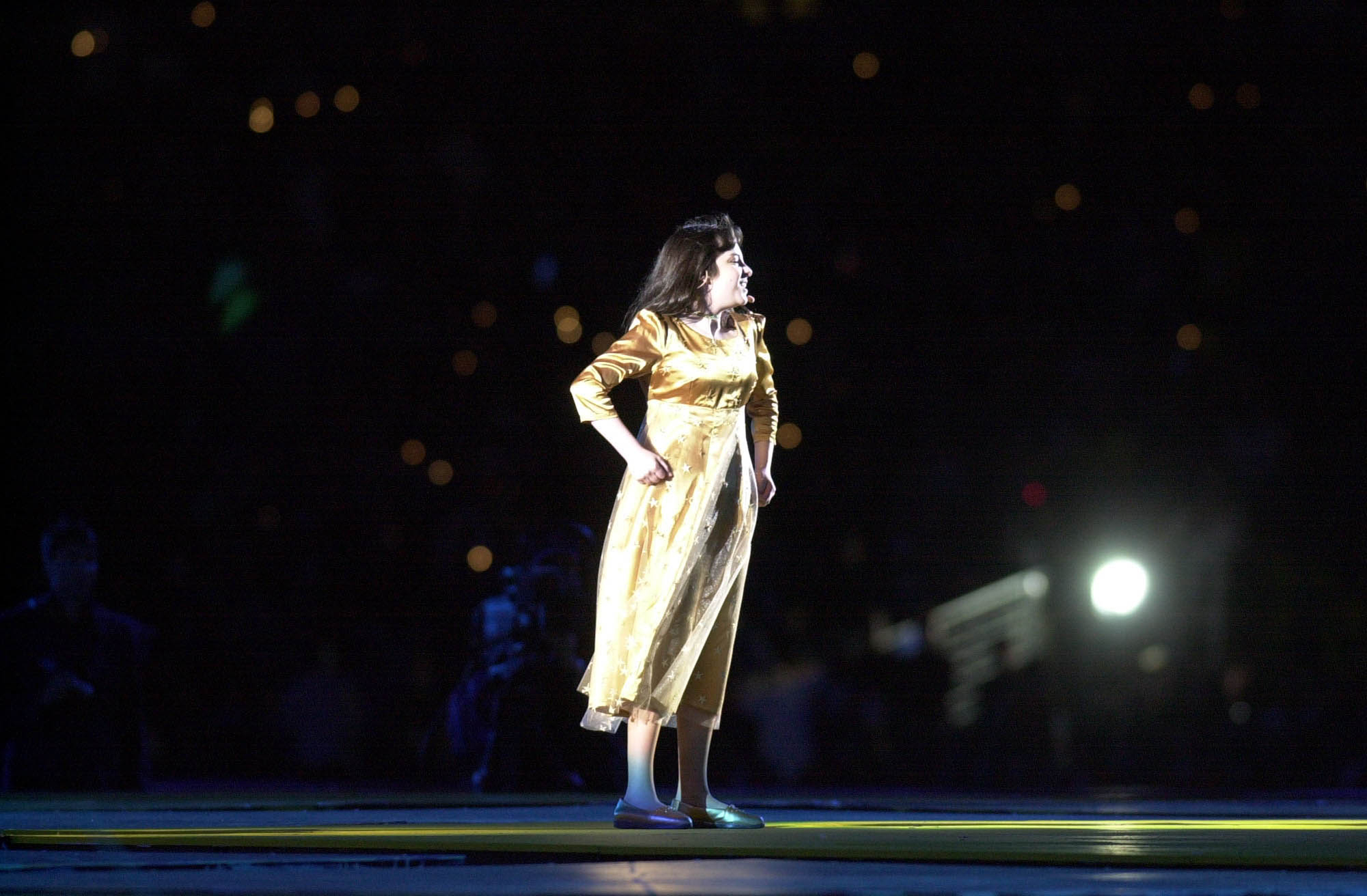
Melissa Ippolito performing during the Opening Ceremony

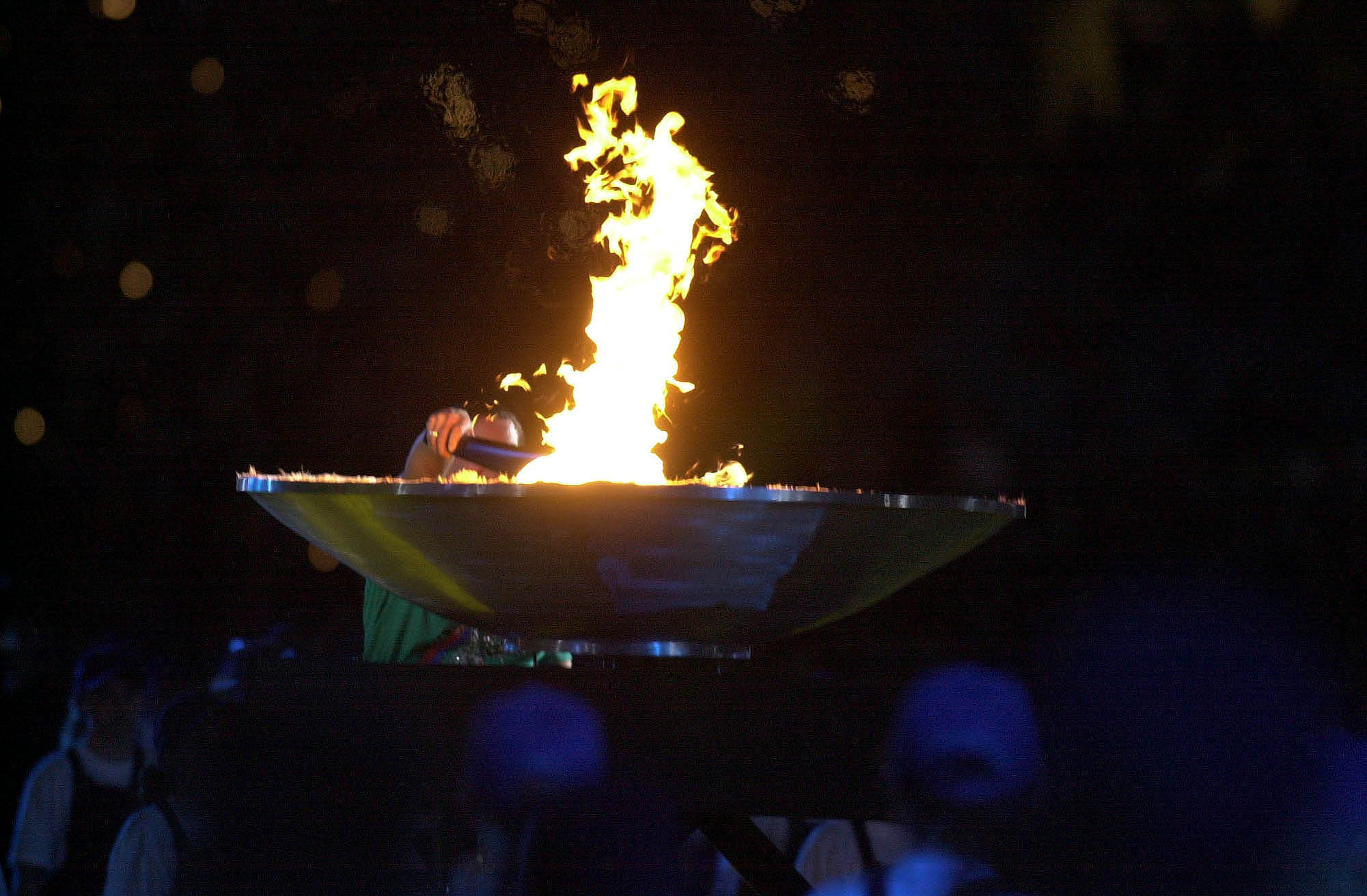
Louise Sauvage litting the Paralympic Cauldron during the Opening Ceremonies

The opening ceremony was held on the 18 October evening, with over 6000 performers and volunteers taking part. The show started by the Australian wheelchair artist Jeffrey St. John sang the national anthem "Advance Australia Fair" and a special song for the event called "The Challenge". World-known Australian actor Bryan Brown acted as the master of the ceremonies for the event and the country artist Graeme Connors sang "Being Here", as the event's official theme song. As the Addresses were given by John Grant, president of the SPOC, and Robert Steadward, president of the IPC, prior to Sir William Deane declaring the official opening of the games.In a break with traditions, the guitarist Nathan Cavaleri played the Paralympic Anthem with their electric guitar with the Paralympic Flag was raised. This was followed by Tracey Cross, a blind swimmer, taking the oath on behalf of the athletes and Mary Longden, an Equestrian referee, taking the oath on behalf of the officials.The protocolar segments ended when Louise Savage lit the Paralympic Cauldron.

Among Yothu Yindi, two other indigenous artists performed at the beginning of the cultural part:the singer Christine Anu and Mark Atkins (playing the didgeridoo), another performers for the cultural segments included the band Taxiride, the actors: Melissa Ippolito and Jack Thompson.The singers Billy Thorpe, Renee Geyer, Tina Harris and Vanessa Amorosi. The 2h30 ceremonies ended when Kylie Minogue take the stage with a special a cappella version of "Waltzing Matilda", her rendition of Kool & the Gang's "Celebration" and her current hit "Spinning Around.

=== Closing ceremonies ===
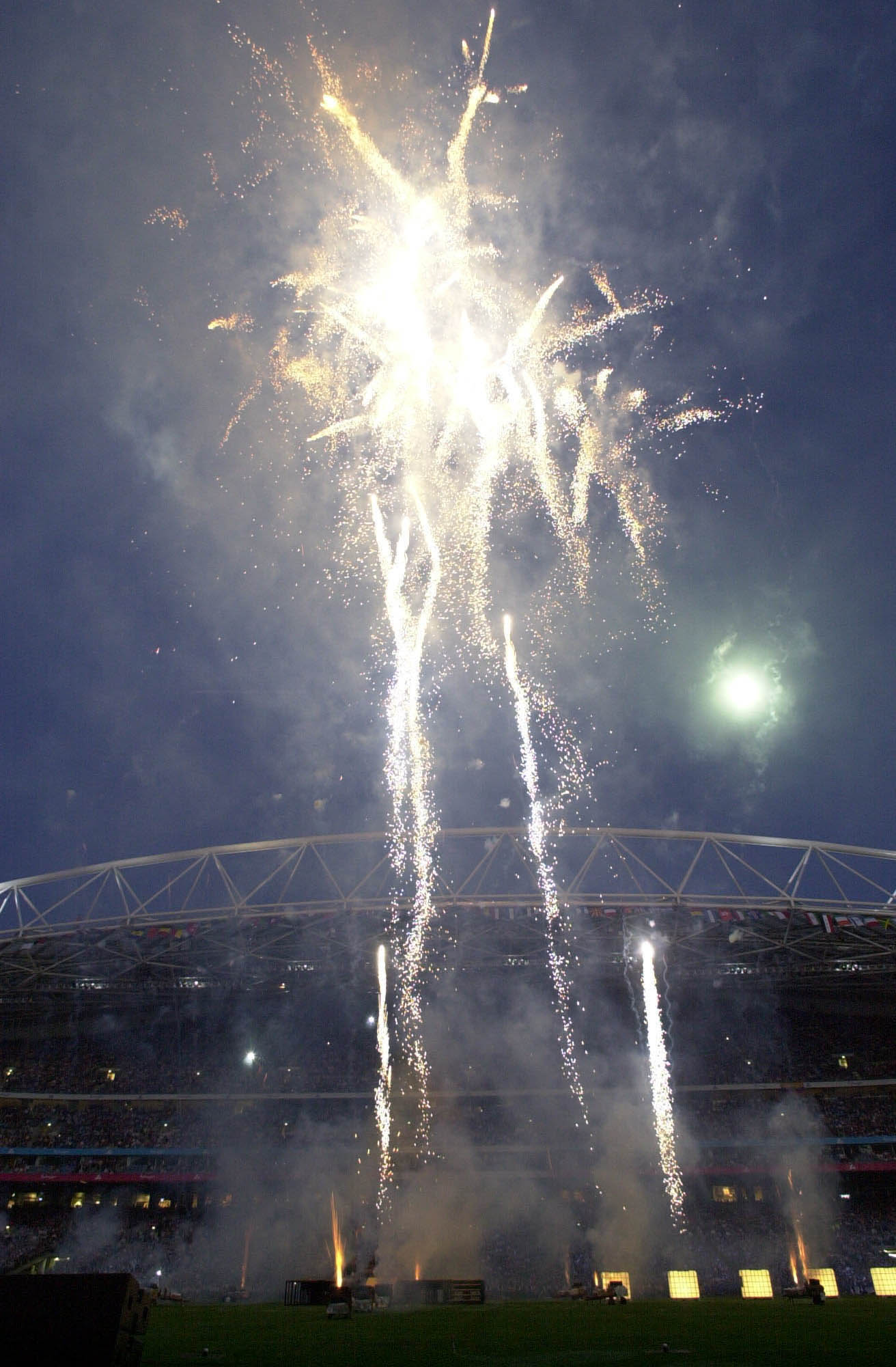
Fireworks starting the Closing Ceremonies

After the ending of the last finals and their medals awarding, the "end party of all parties" happened without any trouble. The last event of the games started at 7:30 pm and was a party filled with fireworks, emotions and celebrations. All the athletes and delegations met for the last time to say goodbye and conclude the games. While Sydney wrote your name on history, the future of the Summer Paralympic Games was insecure and obscure. There were several uncertainties surrounding the Paralympic Movement's next steps. This concern made sense because the host city contract and a multitude of issues turned the holding of the next edition into something totally uncertain and insecure. This issue was a result of the fact that negotiations between the International Paralympic Committee and the Greek authorities had stalled for a few months. and this could remove the Paralympic Games from Athens and transfer them to any other place, putting at risk any type of planning made by athletes, managers and other stakeholders. The crisis between the IPC and the Greek authorities was another chapter in the tense relationship between the IOC and them, which was revealed at the beginning of that year and it became so serious that the then president of the Olympic entity, the Spaniard Juan Antonio Samaranch, had to intervene directly in the ATHOC because of the higher number of delays and bureaucratic obstacles that put the holding of the Olympic Games at risk.

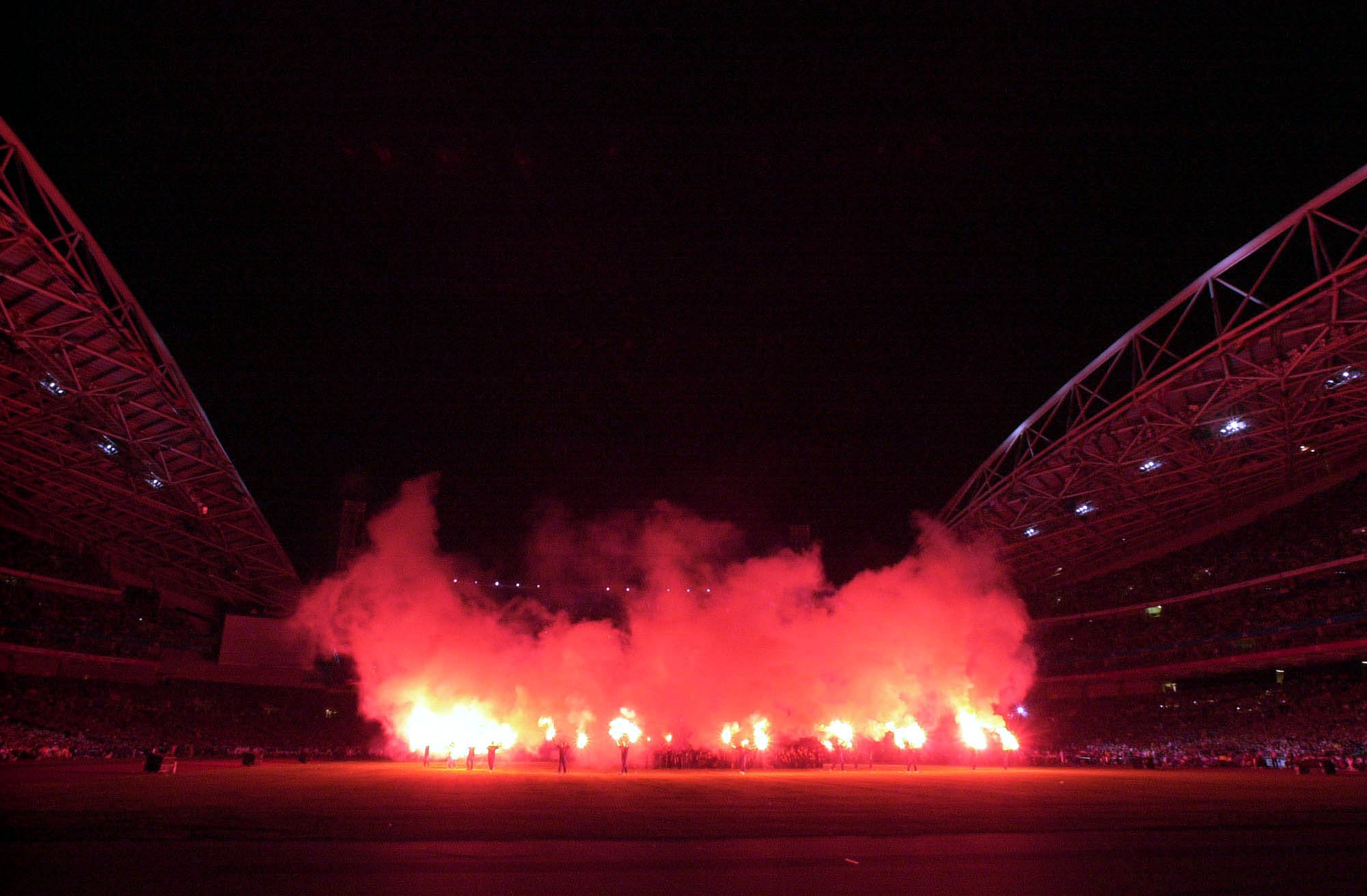
Exact moment where the Paralympic flag is being removed from the stadium and the Paralympic fire is being extinguished.

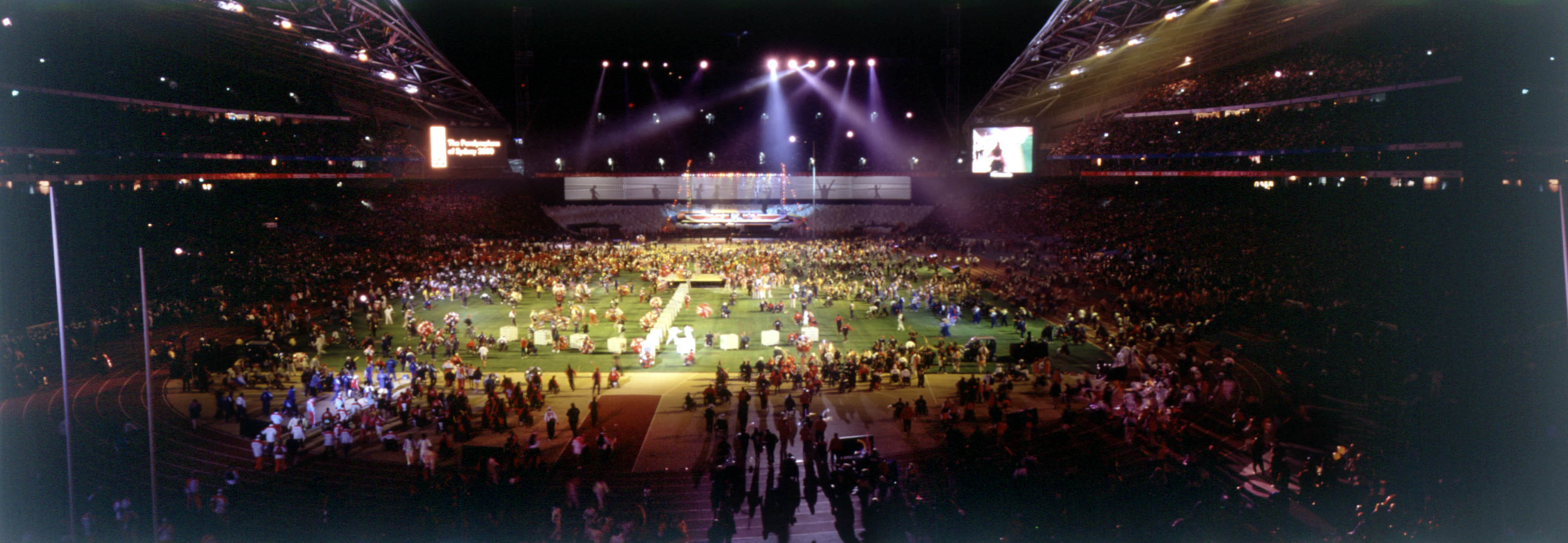
Panoramic view of the 2000 Sydney Paralympic Games Closing Ceremony Carnival

Although the IOC's intervention at ATHOC was unprecedented, the lethargy of the Greek organisers in signing the documentation relating to the guarantees for the 2004 Summer Paralympic Games, irritated and embarrassed the International Paralympic Committee, to the point that during its first press conference held in Sydney, the then president of the IPC, Canadian Robert Steadward, made days before the opening ceremony made public that negotiations with Athens "had not progressed as expected in 1997" and "that until that moment the host city contract for the next summer edition had not been signed". Which reflected "the treatment that people with disabilities were treated in Greece, placing them as second-class people". Furthermore, his criticisms made a lot of sense, since the Paralympic Games were relatively unknown to the majority of the Greek population and the local authorities "did not stand by". Since the resumption of holding the Olympics and Paralympics in the same host city in 1988, this type of situation had not happened and as the uncertainties were real there was a risk that any reference to Athens or Greece would be removed from the closing ceremonies official protocol. This also probably involved a performance of the Greek anthem, the mention of Athens in the closing declaration and even the cancellation of the Paralympic flag handover with the expected cultural demonstration in the so-called Antwerp ceremony. This slowness in the process and also some embarrassing situations due to the ill will of the then Greek Organizing Committee encouraged other cities around the world that wanted to host the Paralympic Games in Athens' place. Rumours suggested that the games in could stay in Sydney, due to the resounding success of this edition or that Stockholm, Cape Town (which lost the right to host the 2004 Summer Olympics to Athens), in addition to Barcelona and a joint project London and Manchester could already be in secret negotiations.

Stedward's scolding did not go down very well with the authorities of the Greek government and the city of Athens, who the following day countered the criticism. made public that "due to the intervention made by the International Olympic Committee since 9 May of this year, all negotiations between ATHOC and the International Paralympic Committee are suspended indefinitely. The city of Athens publicly commits to hosting the 2004 Summer Paralympics, but it still cannot give real guarantees for this, as it does not agree with some terms proposed in the host city contract proposed by the IPC. Further details will be provided soon when these issues are resolved in the progress of these negotiations. "Due to complete ignorance of these issues, Athens city hall was left in a "crossfire" situation, as it was in the middle of exchanging accusations between the Organizers and the Costas Simitis cabinet.

The issues of stress regarding these issues that could not be made public until that moment reached the ears of the IOC, which began to try to mediate the situation. But, even before the conclusion, the Athens city council, as a sign of goodwill in negotiating these "controversial" terms, decided to send a last-minute small informal delegation to Sydney to participate in the closing ceremony and receive the Paralympic flag. This delegation was led by the then-deputy mayor Nikos Yiatrakos to receive the Paralympic flag on behalf of the city during the closing ceremony. Confirming the real intentions of the Greeks in hosting the Paralympic Games. A few days later it emerged that the issue itself was related to the fact that the IPC was demanding that the Greeks would have to pay a guarantee of US$3 million, more than double what the Australians had paid. Sometime later it was discovered that these 3 million dollars were related to the cost of registration fees for Paralympic athletes and that they were only guaranteed after the IOC injected part of this money through the first mutual collaboration agreement signed during the Sydney Games.

The IPC has expressed its concern, about that Greek organisers have shown little interest in the Paralympic Games. This was the case from the beginning. When Athens won the bid for the 2004 games they expressed surprise when they were told afterwards that this also meant they would host the Paralympic Games. The IPC has expressed its concern, noting that Greek organisers have shown little interest in Paralympics. But later they were shocked when they discovered that this would also take into account that they had the responsibility of jointly hosting the Paralympics.

Although Greece had participated in the Paralympic Games since 1976, Greek delegations were sent in a decentralised manner and according to the protocol any type of negotiations between the International Paralympic Committee and the Organizers of each edition must be mediated by the National Paralympic Committee, But at that moment the Hellenic Paralympic Committee didn't exist, which made it impossible to sign the host city contract. The late surprise arrival of the delegation was seen by the Australians and by the IPC itself as a sign of acceptance of criticism and also of humility and goodwill.After this arrival, SPOC agreed to produce a more simpler Paralympic handover ceremony than usual. To ensure this gap, the Australian producers invited the Millennium Choir of the Greek Orthodox Archdiocese of Australia to made a special performance from the Mikis Theodorakis song "Tis Dikaiosinis Ilie " ("Sun of Justice", from the soundtrack of the movie Zorba the Greek). To close the ceremonies, the first Australian group to make international success outside the country, The Seekers, closed the games with their world know hit song "The Carnival Is Over". The band was originally meant to be the last act of the closing ceremonies of the 2000 Summer Olympics, but due to an accident some days before the event resulting in a broken hip, they moved their performance to the Paralympics and the lead singer Judith Durham sang the song sitting in a wheelchair.

A dispute with the Greeks would only be resolved in April 2001 when the host city contract was finally signed.

== Calendar ==
In the following calendar for the 2000 Summer Paralympics, each blue box represents an event competition. The yellow boxes represent days during which medal-awarding finals for a sport were held. The number in each yellow box represents the number of finals that were contested on that day.

Legend for colours in events table below
●	Opening ceremony	Event competitions	Event finals	●	Closing ceremony

Competition events by sport and day
October	Wed 18th	Thu 19th	Fri 20th	Sat 21st	Sun 22nd	Mon 23rd	Tue 24th	Wed 25th	Thu 26th	Fri 27th	Sat 28th	Sun 29th	Gold medals
Ceremonies	OC											CC	—N/a
Archery			●	●	2	●	3	2					7
Athletics			17	20	23	28	20	28	27	23	31	13	234
Basketball ID		●	●	●	●	●	1						1
Boccia				●	●	3	●	2					5
Cycling Track		3	4	1	2	5							15
Cycling Road								3	5	4			12
Equestrian							●	2	2	2	3		9
Football 7-a-side				●		●		●		●		1	1
Goalball						●	●	●	●	●	●	2	2
Judo		2	2	3									7
Powerlifting				5	5		2	2	2	2	2		10
Sailing			●	●	●	●	●	●	●	2			2
Shooting		2	2	2	2	2	2						12
Sitting volleyball			●	●	●	●	●		●	●	1		1
Standing volleyball				●	●	●	●		●	1			1
Swimming			16	18	16	10	24	18	15	22	22		169
Table tennis		●	2	4	5		●	●	5	5	5		26
Wheelchair basketball		●	●	●	●	●		●	●	1	1		2
Wheelchair fencing			4	2	3	4	2						15
Wheelchair rugby								●	●	●	●	1	1
Wheelchair tennis			●	●	●	●	●	●	●	2	2		4
Total	0	7	47	55	58	52	54	57	56	64	67	17	550

== Venues ==
In total 12 venues were used at the 2000 Summer Olympics were used at the games in Sydney.

=== Sydney Olympic Park ===
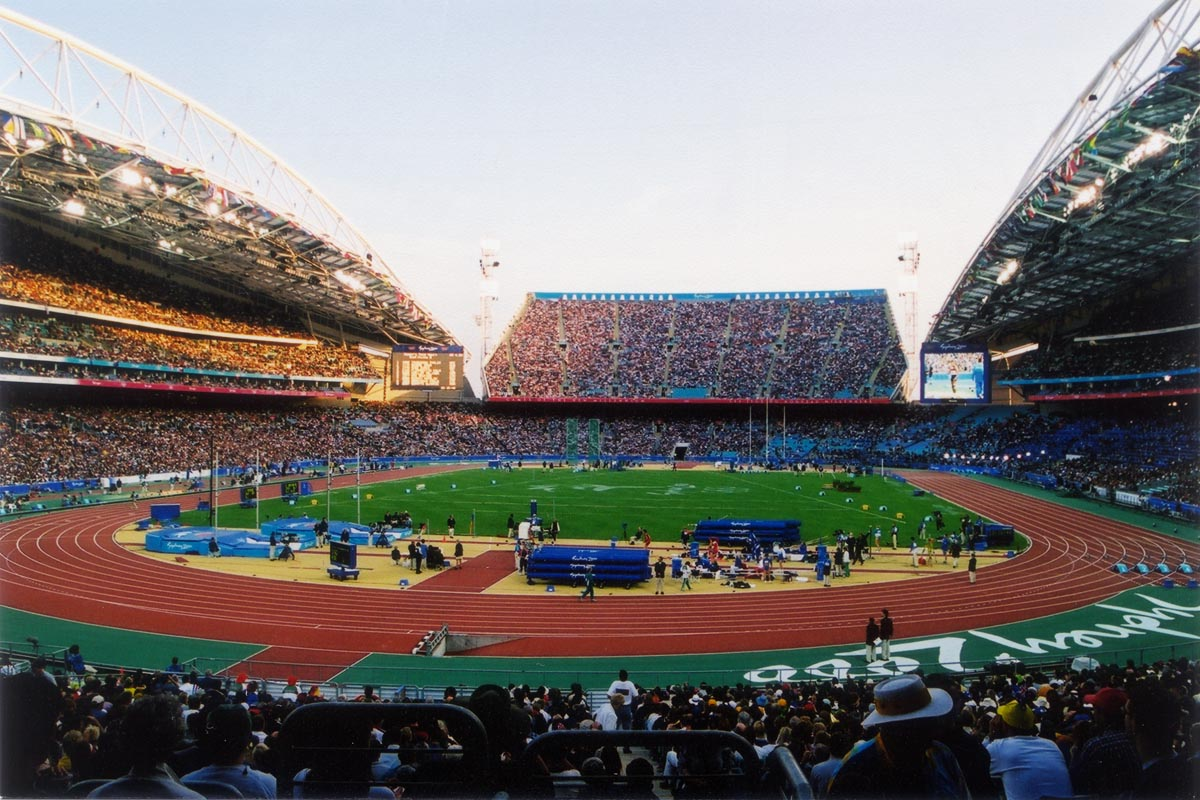
Olympic Stadium

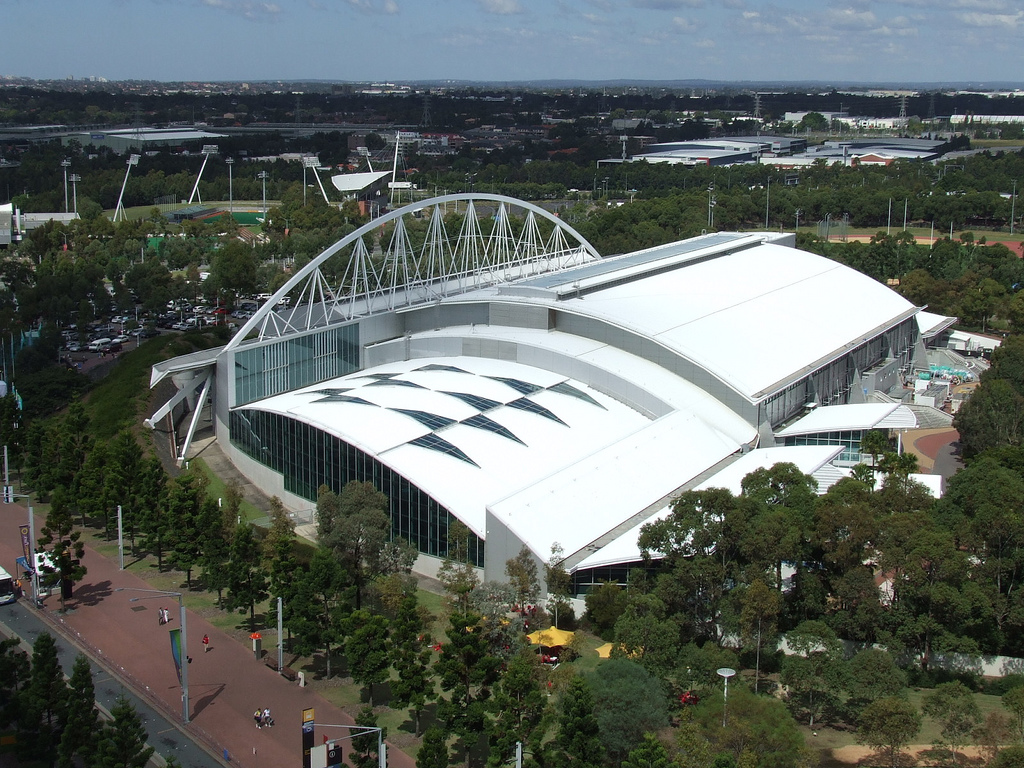
Sydney Olympic Park Aquatic Centre

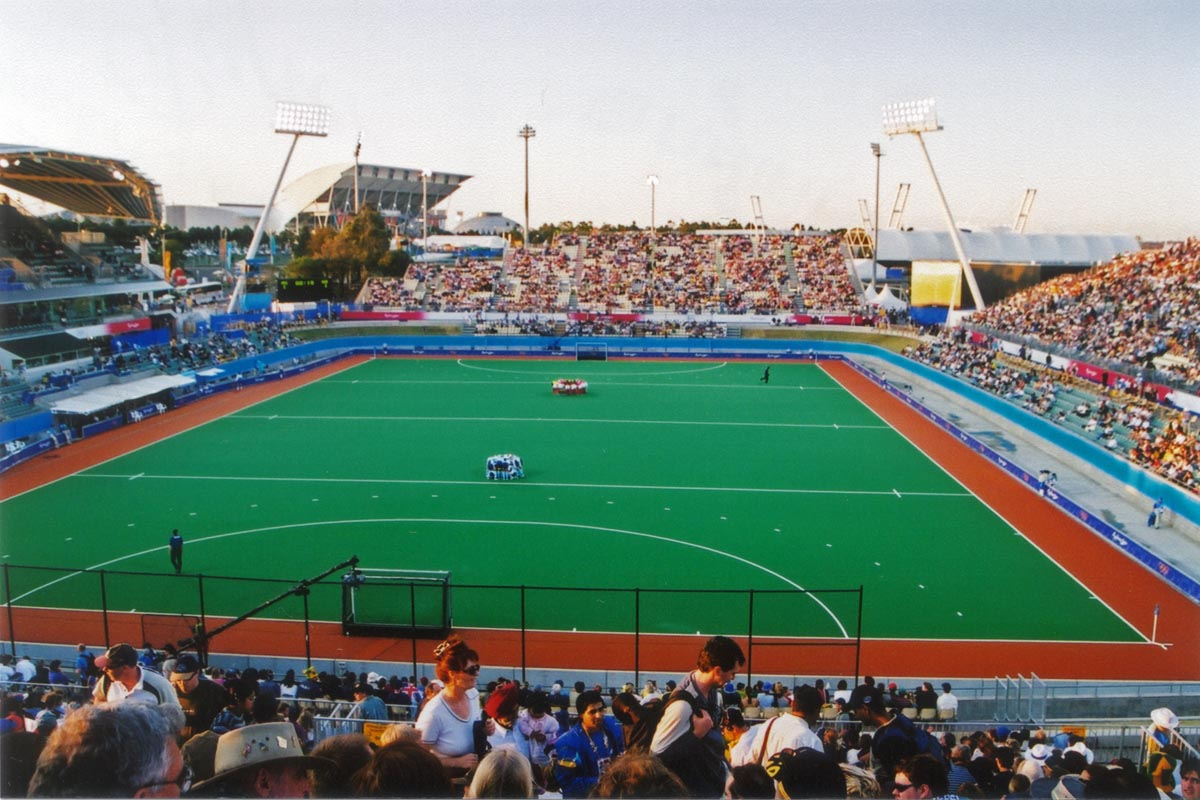
State Hockey Centre

- Olympic Stadium: Ceremonies (opening/closing) and Athletics
- Sydney Olympic Park Tennis Centre: Wheelchair Tennis
- State Sports Centre: Table Tennis
- Sydney International Aquatic Centre: Swimming
- Sydney International Archery Park: Archery
- State Hockey Centre: Football-7-side
- Sydney Showground Pavilions:ID Basketball, Goalball, Wheelchair Basketball (secondary venues), Judo, Wheelchair Rugby, Powerlifiting, Wheelchair Fencing, Sitting Volleyball and Standing Volleyball
- Sydney SuperDome: Wheelchair Basketball (main venue)

=== Sydney ===
- Centennial Parklands: Road Cycling
- Dunc Gray Velodrome: Track Cycling
- Sydney International Equestrian Centre: Equestrian
- Olympic Sailing Shore Base: Sailing
- Sydney International Shooting Centre: Shooting

== Torch relay ==
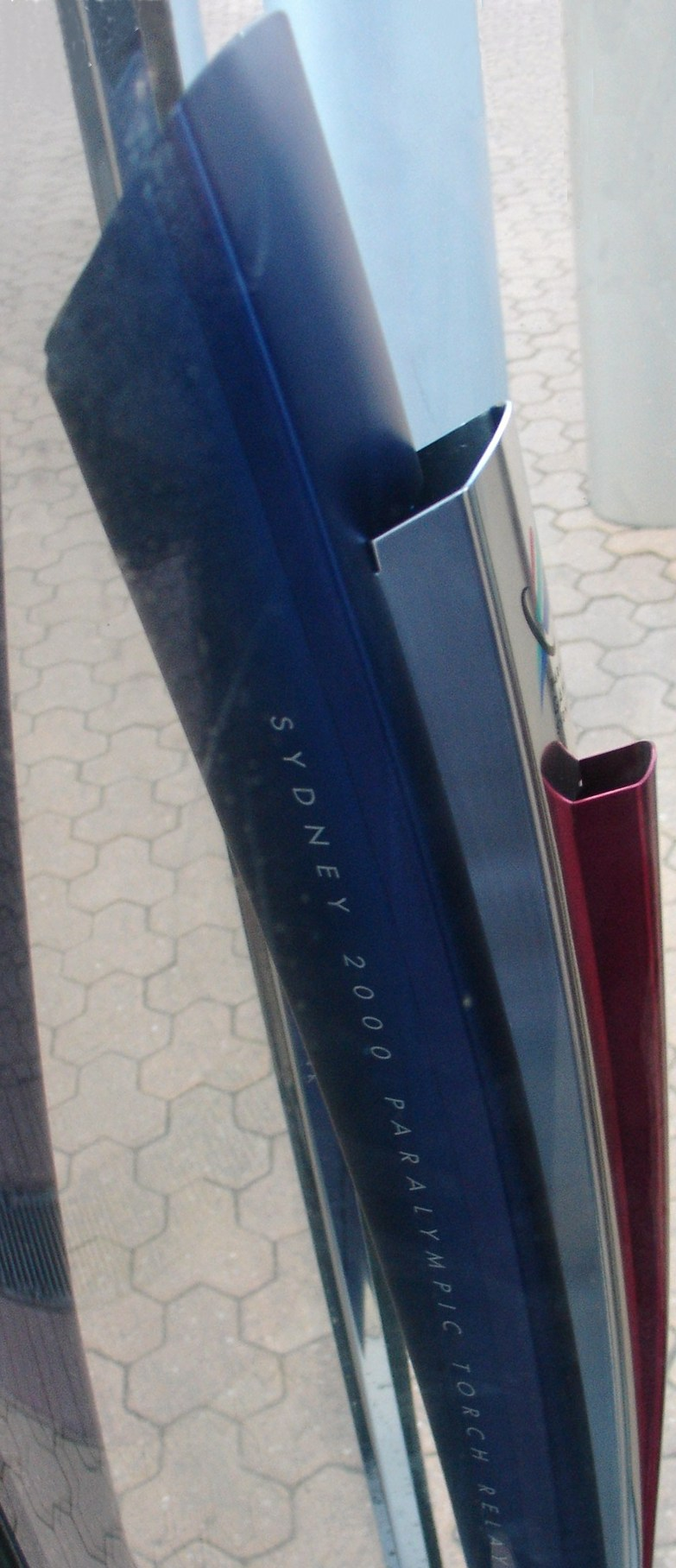
Paralympic Torch, designed by Robert Jurgens, now placed in front of Stadium Australia.

=== Torch design ===
The theme of the relay was "Lighting the Way" because in addition to lighting the way to the Olympic Stadium, SPOC wanted this relay to also be an event to raise awareness about the culture of safe traffic, as this is still the biggest cause of paraplegia around the world.

Made from the same material and with the same combustion system as its Olympic counterpart The Sydney 2000 Paralympic torch, was a real representation of the games logo and when fully assembled it weighed around 1.5 kg and was 72 cm tall, being minimally smaller than its Olympic sister.

The torch was drafted in 1997 by one of the Sydney Paralympic Organizing Committee's (SPOC) in-house designers, who designed the first torch shell, referencing the layered, arched logo of the Sydney Paralympic Games.Between July 1998 and March 1999, the torch's design was refined and minimally changed by Sydney toolmakers and metal pressing specialists, G.A.& L. Harrington (GALH), which resolved issues relating to the interlocking shells, choke, filtering system, colours, surface textures and other elements. Following the media launch, on 8 March 1999, the company started torch production, making 1000 Paralympic torches (around 100 were made as a reserve supply) and 14,000 Olympic torches by early 2000.

=== The relay ===
The 2000 Summer Paralympic torch was born from a ritual carried out by the people Ngunnawal at Australian Parlament House gardens held on 5 October 2000. In this ritual was also present the then Australian Prime Minister John Howard and the first torchbearer, the wheelchair tennis player David Hall, who, along the present public, witnessed the lighting of the flame on the forecourt of Parliament House, Canberra, and the performance of traditional and contemporary indigenous dance. In this ritual, three generations of the community, who are the original inhabitants of the Australian Capital Territory area, were involved today in creating the flame to fuel the MAA Sydney 2000 Paralympic Torch Relay as it travels around Australia. The Ngunnawal dancers, painted in ochre, then joined the three generations of the Ngunnawal community, who passed the firestick from the eldest to the youngest generation who lit the cauldron as dawn broke. The smoking then continued, with ceremonial smoking bowls of burning eucalyptus leaves used to welcome strangers and protect them. But, in this case, the smoke and the fire personify the Paralympic spirit, providing protection to athletes and all those who would be arriving at the next days.

It was up to SPOC's first specific partner, the Motor Accidents Authority of NSW (MAA) (who acted in a similar way which operated in a similar way to the Shepherd Center in 1996), all the responsibility for sponsorship, logistics operations and other actions relative to the Paralympic torch relay as part of a public awareness campaign regarding safe traffic. MAA strengthened its relations with SPOC in June 1997, when evolved to the first the first specific sponsor for the 2000 Summer Paralympic Games. Since the start, the Authority was extensively involved in sport for people with a disability. At the same time as investing in the promotion and organisation of the event, MAA was responsible for carrying out a campaign and an awareness program focused on 13 to 25 year students about safe traffic and the catastrophic consequences of not respecting its rules. For this to be done, 16 Australian para-athletes who were victims of accidents were recruited to form a team of ambassadors in which they "were living proof that accidents can happen" and that if there was conscious responsibility on the part of those who are driving, these accidents would not even happen.Later,9 other athletes who were born with some other disability joined the team. MAA also gave 300 people a chance to carry the torch in the Torch Relay competition. In order for a person to apply, they must be over 12 years old during October 2000 and also be a permanent resident of Australia.

The function of the relay was to maintain the level of excitement and engagement of the Australian population during the transition period between the two events. His role was also to raise awareness among the population about the issue of integrating people with disabilities into society, traffic safety and several other issues. However, the land route was centred in New South Wales because it was there that the organisation decided focus on ticket sales due to the close distance from Sydney.

The Paralympic Torch Relay succeeded in generating community and media support for the games, with crowds in many areas and significant crowds lining the Sydney metropolitan route in the final two days of the relay and was the conclusion of a project that began through an educational process that began in 1997, when a totally different strategy was developed.

==== Torch relay route ====
The then Prime Minister of Australia, John Howard, announced his government's support of the MAA Sydney 2000 Paralympic Torch Relay at a launch of the torch design and route in Canberra on 28 July 1999.But originally, this would be a relay exclusively within the state of New South Wales and the Australian Capital Territory, with the torch route going exclusively overland between the Parliament House, Canberra to the Stadium Australia, passing only through the two territories roads. However, in September 1999, the Federal Government of Australia announced that it was allocating an extra amount of around AU$500.0000 for the relay to visit other Australian states in their capitals.

The first phase of the relay route involved the capitals of the six Australian states and the two contiguous territories, where the torch passed in a clockwise way. At relay's first morning in Canberra area, the torch visited the Australian Institute of Sport (AIS) and passing nearby Duntroon before it boarded in a Royal Australian Air Force Falcon 900 executive jet in way for Melbourne. This air route covered 11,500 km by air and after Melbourne the torch visited on this sequence: Hobart (6 October), Adelaide (7 October), Perth (8 October), Darwin (9 October) and Brisbane (10 October) before starting a 750 km journey by road in New South Wales starting at the Moss Vale on 12 October. During the land component, the torch travelled about 7.5 kilometres per hour and covered around 65 kilometres per day. On average, each bearer ran with the torch for 1 km each. With each day of the relay ending at night in a major center, the torch travelled through 30 cities and towns during the 14 days of its route. The last two major urban centres in which the torch made its way were Newcastle and Wollongong, where it entered the Sydney Metropolitan Region, where it spent approximately two days before it makes its way to the opening ceremony. The route was developed so that each community makes the most of the torch's stay in its territory. It was also highlighted that there were several differences between the Olympic torch route and the Paralympic torch route in different aspects and points of interest. It is also noteworthy that each day of the relay lasted an average of 10 hours and during each night, members of the NSW Police Service were responsible for keeping the flame inside the lantern.

The comeback journey in New South Wales had legs at the Southern Highlands, Illawarra, Campbelltown, Penrith, Windsor, Hunter and Central Coast areas, before heading to Sydney on 16 October 2000 when the torch visited the city mainland marks. Also on October 17, the Paralympic flame was carried across the main arch of the Sydney Harbour Bridge by four torchbearers.

The then Motor Accidents Authority of New South Wales was responsible for the planning, logistics and execution of the relay alongside the Australian State Security Forces.

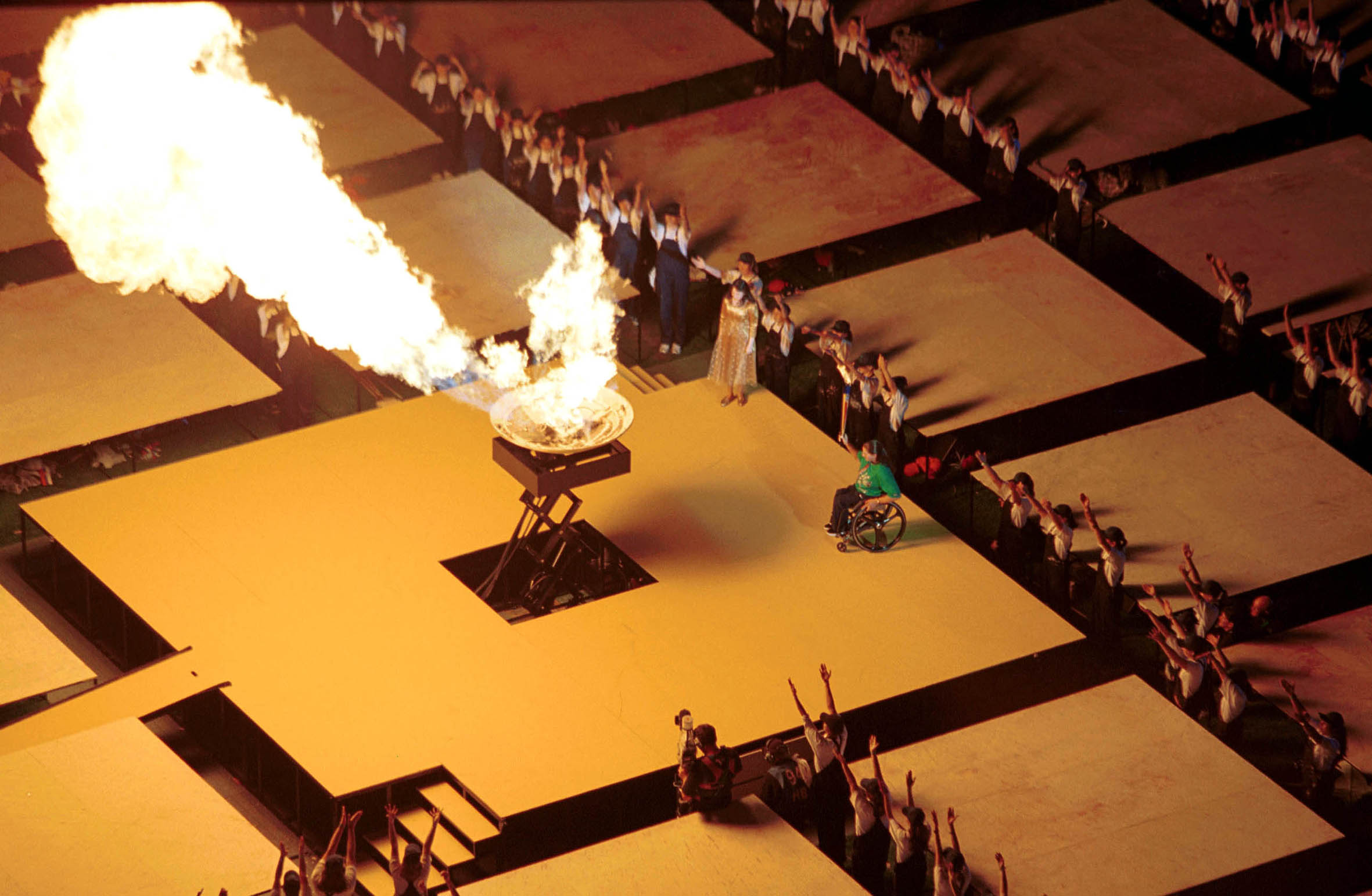
Australian legend Louise Sauvage lights the Paralympic Cauldron at the finish of the torch relay, 2000 Summer Paralympics Opening Ceremony.

== Sports and impairment groups ==
The final program of the games was presented by the Executive Council of the IPC in a meeting that took place between 12 and 16 March 1997 in Sweden. At this same meeting, SPOC presented its sustainability policies that were developed in a connected way and mirrored those implemented by SOOCOG. This program proposals needed to be independently approved by both the IPC and SPOC.

The first version of this edition's sports program was approved in September 1996, when the IPC executive board decided in a session held during the Atlanta Games that at the same time as lawn bowls would leave the program, wheelchair rugby and sailing would evolve into sports included in the official program, after being demonstration sports that year.The preliminary number of events planned for the games was impressive because it was planned to hold 582 finals in 18 sports.However, this number fell at the beginning of 2000 to 551, as 31 events were discarded from the program for various reasons such as a low number of registrants, low or insufficient technical level recorded during the process of classification, review and merger of functional classes.

=== 1997 draft program ===
In May 1997, the same group approved the final Sydney 2000 program with the following changes:

- The number of events in athletics rose from 211 to 234 with the addition of 14 new events for intellectually disabled people and a review of the sport's functional classification, which resulted in a 1 extra event.However, later 8 other events were added for other reasons.
- The addition of an 8-team basketball tournament for intellectually disabled.
- Omnium events for LC1, LC2 and LC3 classes in cycling were removed, and three time trials, three individual pursuit events and one Olympic sprint were introduced for the LC class.
- Powerlifting gained 10 more events with the addition of women's events.
- One more event was added in sailing: Single person 2.4mr
- Three air rifle events were eliminated from the shooting program.
- Twelve events were added to the swimming program for the intellectually disabled, while one was removed.
- The four open table tennis events for men and women were removed from the program and events for intellectually disabled people replaced them.

=== Sports events ===
- Archery (7)
- Athletics (234)
- Basketball ID (1)
- Boccia (5)
- Paralympic cycling
  - Road (15)
  - Track (12)
- Equestrian (9)
- Football 7-a-side (1)
- Goalball (2)
- Judo (7)
- Powerlifting (20)
- Sailing (2)
- Shooting (12)
- Swimming (169)
- Table tennis (26)
- Volleyball (2)
- Wheelchair basketball (2)
- Wheelchair fencing (15)
- Wheelchair rugby (1)
- Wheelchair tennis (4)

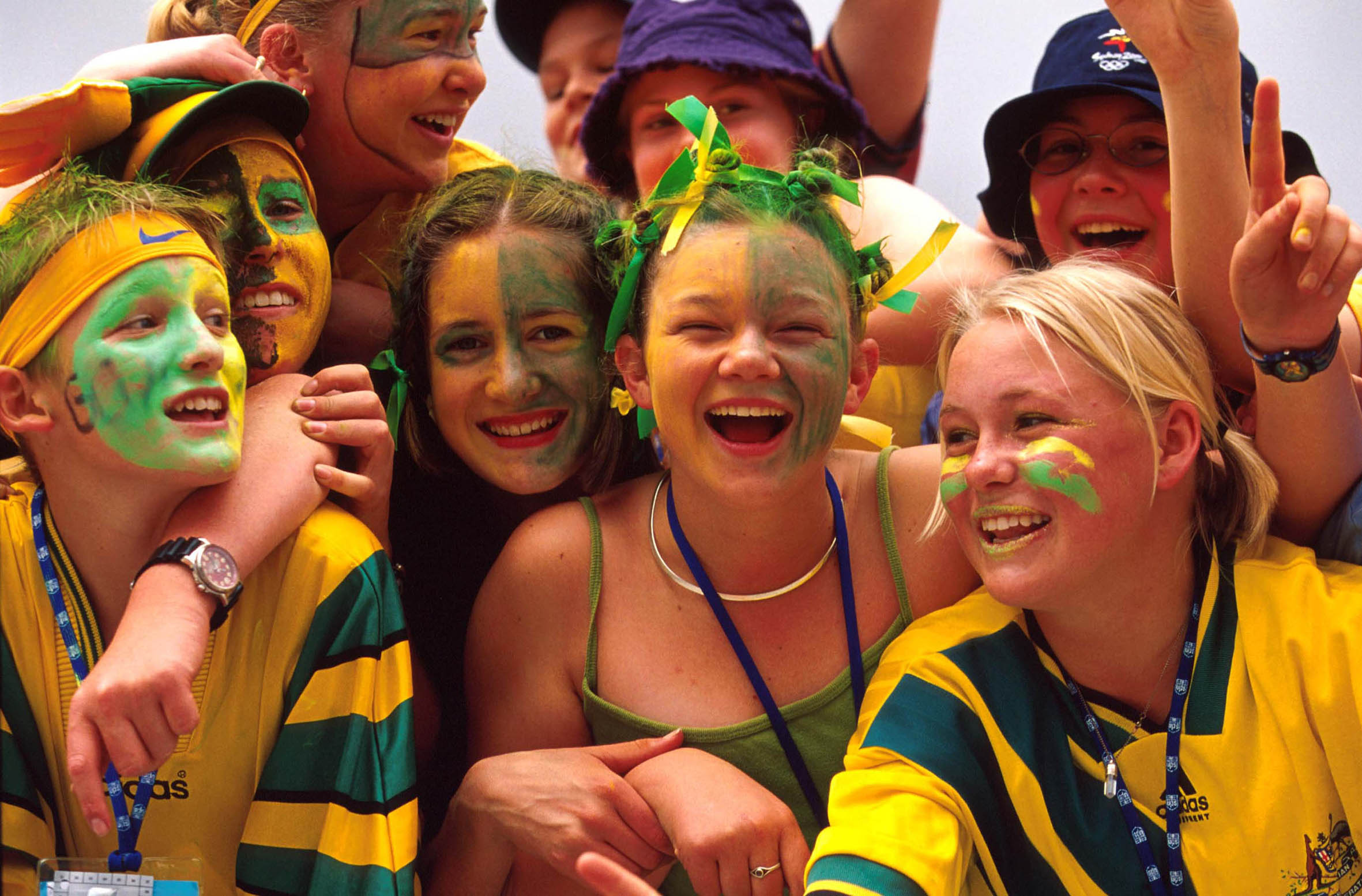
Excited school children in green and gold show their support for the Australian Paralympic Team at the 2000 Summer Paralympics.

== Games highlights ==
The amount of advances and the strategy of transforming the event into something unprecedented, caused the then president of the International Paralympic Committee, the Canadian Robert Stedward declared that Sydney had so far been the "best Paralympics in history" and the commitment of an entire society was reflected in more than 1.2 million tickets sold (exceeding the organisers' expectations by more than 100.000), well more than twice as many as were sold four years earlier in Atlanta. It was very common to observe, during the 12 days of the games, crowded arenas with a different audience than that seen at the Olympic Games. And the excitement from the public was reflected in the athletes resulting in the breaking of more than 300 world and Paralympic records.

The organisers proved that the risky proposal, resulted in an impacted success, with no type of differentiation in the basic services offered in the Paralympic Village. The information technologies, medical care and logistics systems were extended to the games. There was not even any differentiation in services offered to the public present in the arenas. During the games, the Paralympic Village housed near 7000 people. There were 3,824 athletes, 2,315 team officials and 804 technical officials. For the hosts, this edition is even more historic, because from the first day they remained in first place in the medals table and consolidated this position with 63 gold, 39 silver and 47 bronze medals, for a total of 149.Birth of the Paralympic Movement, Great Britain took the 41 gold medals most silver medals, with 43, and tied Australia for the most bronze medals, with 47, reaching 131.

There were numerous athletes who contributed multiple medals to their national tally. In the pool these included Béatrice Hess of France who won seven golds, Mayumi Narita of Japan who won six golds and a silver, Siobhan Paton of Australia who won six golds in individual events, and Stéphanie Dixon of Canada and Hong Yan Zhu of China who each won five golds. On the track Tim Sullivan of Australia won five golds, and Tanni Grey-Thompson of Great Britain won four.

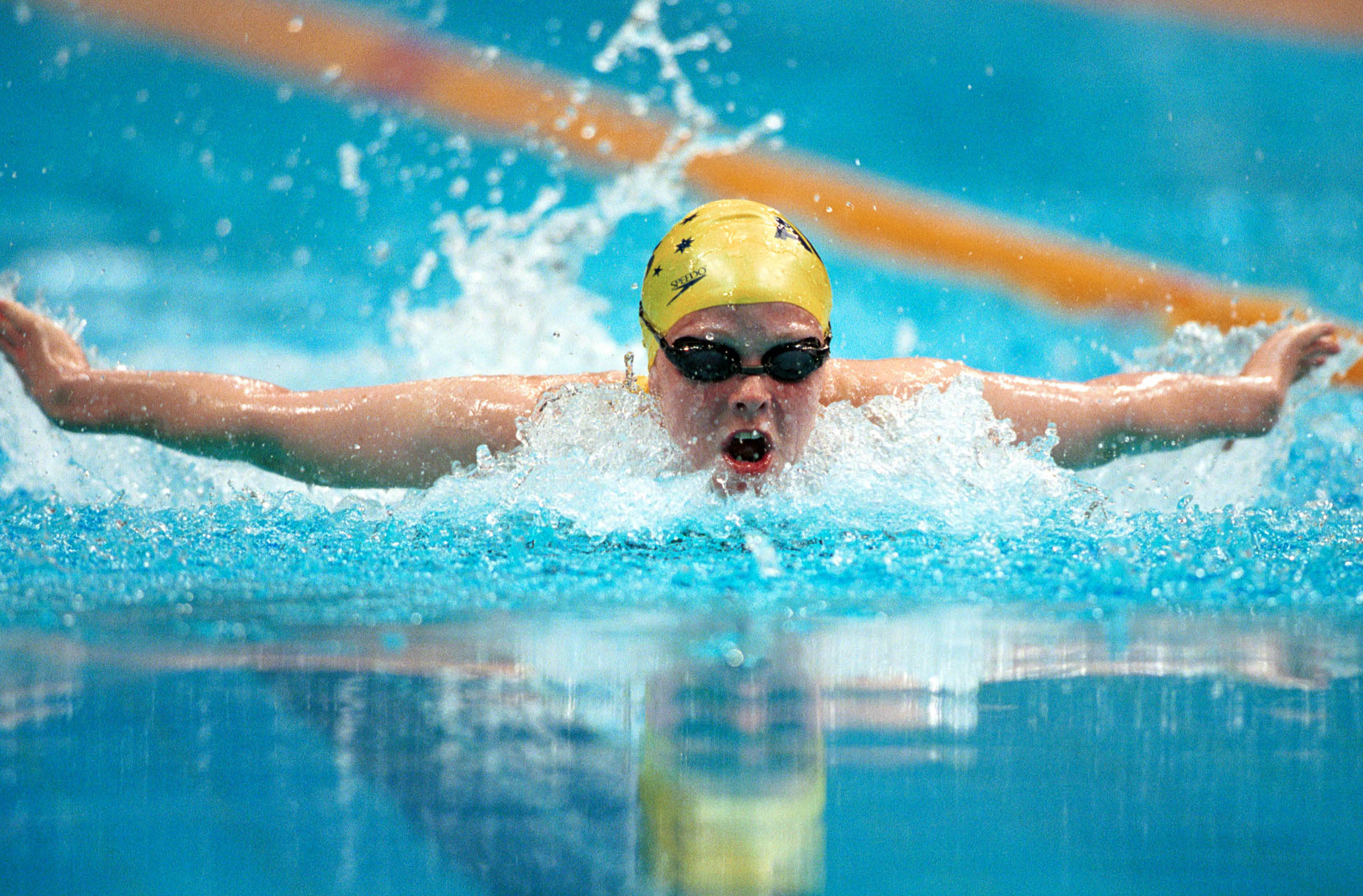
Action shot of Australian swimming star Siobhan Paton, who won six gold medals at the 2000 Summer Paralympics.

However, it stands out that in individual terms, the greatest performances came from Australian athletes.The host team had a number of notable gold and historial medal-winning performances. Individual achievements included swimmer Siobhan Paton's six gold medals in the 200m SM14 individual medley, and S14 100m freestyle, 50m butterfly, 50m backstroke, 200m freestyle, and 50m freestyle. She set nine world records in the process.

Tim Sullivan topped the athletics medal tally with five gold medals. Sullivan won three gold medals in the T38 200m, 100m, and 400m events, and won the two gold medals at their relays Darren Thrupp, Adrian Grogan and Kieran Ault-Connell (T38 4X400m and 4X100m races). The top performing female track and field athlete was Lisa Llorens, who won three gold medals from the F20 high jump, long jump and T20 200m. Llorens also won a silver medal in the T20 100m.

Other track medallists included Neil Fuller won two golds in the T44 200m, and 400m events, as well as one individual bronze medal in the T44 100m. Fuller later combined with Tim Matthews, Stephen Wilson and Heath Francis to win another two gold medals in the T45 4X100m relay and T46 4X400m relay. Francis also went on to win a total of three golds and one silver after also winning an individual gold and silver in the T46 400m and T46 200m events respectively. Other track medallists were Amy Winters with two golds in the T46 200m and 100m T46, and a bronze in the T46 400m. Greg Smith also won three gold medals in the 800m, 5,000m and 1,500m T52 events.

In cycling, Matthew Gray won two golds in the velodrome in the individual cycling mixed 1 km time trial LC1, and a gold in the mixed team sprint with Paul Lake and Greg Ball. Sarnya Parker and Tania Morda also won two golds in the women's cycling tandem 1 km time trial and women's tandem cycling individual pursuit open.

=== Views ===
An example of this change in perception is cited by the British para-athlete Tanni Grey-Thompson, a multiple Paralympic gold winner, later said of the Sydney Games:

Sydney 2000 will always hold a special place in the hearts of everyone who was there. The Aussies love their sport and they treated us simply as sportsmen and women. We weren't regarded as role models or inspirations, we were competitors. Some of us won gold medals, most didn't, but, hey, that's life. Sydney was phenomenal because, from day one, you felt there was something extraordinarily special in the air. Sydney was an athletic Disneyland, it was where magic happened. It probably marked the time and place when Paralympians genuinely became part of the Olympic Movement.

== Medal counts ==
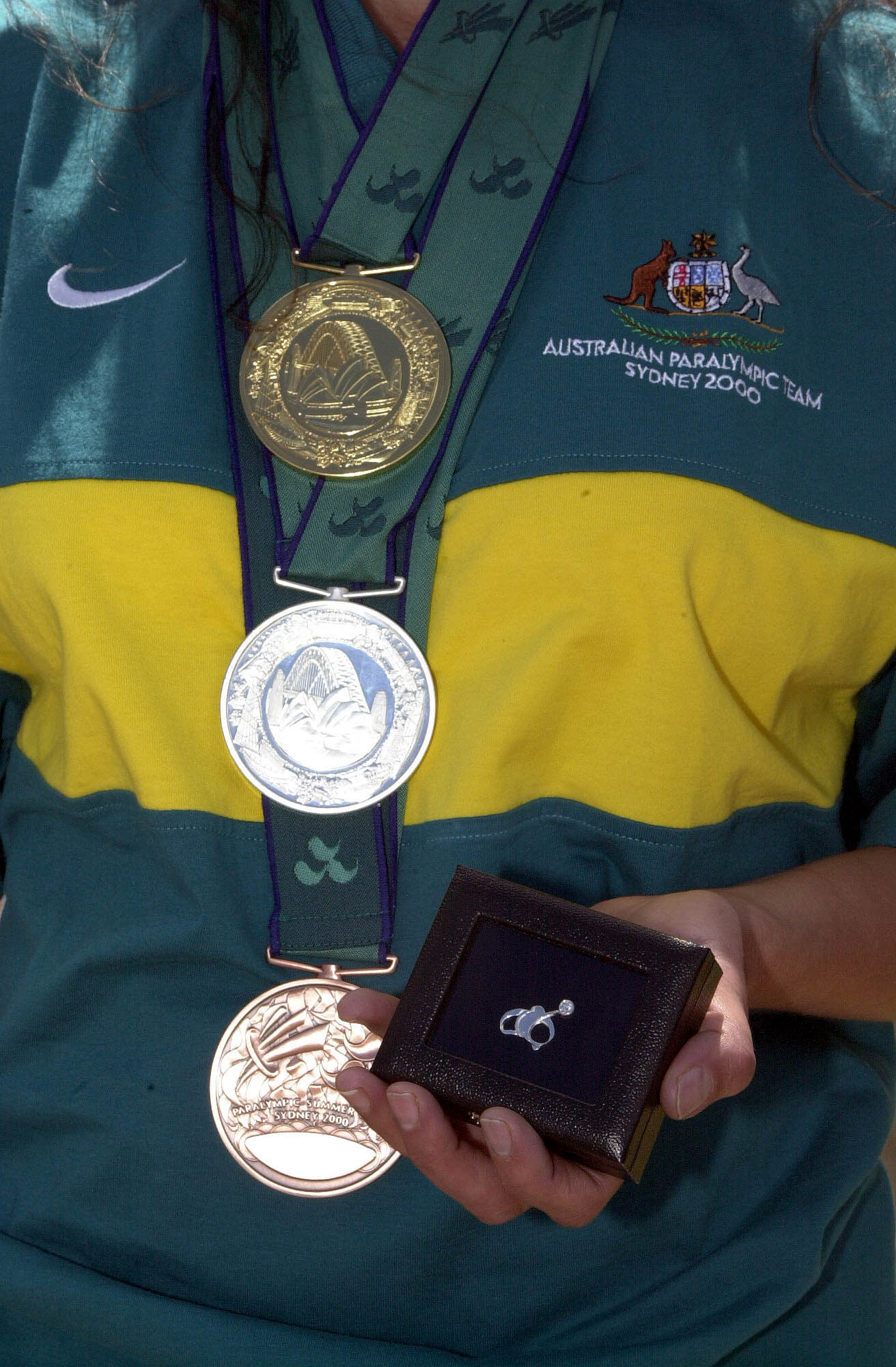
Australian cyclist Lyn Lepore shows a gold, silver and bronze medal from the 2000 Sydney Paralympic Games plus the diamond pin presented to her by BHP for winning gold.

A total of 1657 medals were awarded during the Sydney games: 550 gold, 549 silver, and 558 bronze. The host country, Australia, topped the medal count with more gold medals and more medals overall than any other nation. Great Britain took the most silver medals, with 43, and tied Australia for the most bronze medals, with 47.

In the table below, the ranking sorts by the number of gold medals earned by a nation (in this context a nation is an entity represented by a National Paralympic Committee). The number of silver medals is taken into consideration next and then the number of bronze medals.

Host country (Australia)

Rank	Nation	Gold	Silver	Bronze	Total
1	Australia (AUS)*	63	39	47	149
2	Great Britain (GBR)	41	43	47	131
3	Canada (CAN)	38	33	25	96
4	Spain (ESP)	38	30	38	106
5	United States (USA)	36	39	34	109
6	China (CHN)	34	22	17	73
7	France (FRA)	30	28	28	86
8	Poland (POL)	19	24	10	53
9	South Korea (KOR)	18	7	7	32
10	Germany (GER)	16	41	38	95
Totals (10 entries)		333	306	291	930

== Participating delegations ==
Originally, organisers expected 136 National Paralympic Committees to participate in the games, but only 123 sent their delegations to the Sydney Paralympics. Included among them was a team of "Individual Paralympic Athletes" from East Timor. The newly independent country had not yet established a National Paralympic Committee in time for send a delegation to Sydney, so the International Paralympic Committee invited East Timorese athletes to compete at the games under the title of Individual Paralympic Athletes.

Afghanistan did not participate in the 2000 Summer Paralympics, having been banned from the games due to its treatment of women under Taliban rule.

El Salvador and Turkey were the only countries that were present in Barcelona and returned to compete in Sydney.

Barbados, Benin, Cambodia, Laos, Lebanon, Lesotho, Madagascar, Mali, Mauritania, Mongolia, Palestine, Rwanda, Samoa, Turkmenistan, Vanuatu and Vietnam competed for the first time.

Cameroon, Côte d'Ivoire, Guatemala, Guinea, Iraq, Nicaragua, Niger, Sierra Leone and Sudan classified athletes or won wildcards, but due to financial reasons they were unable to send their delegations to Sydney, and it was because of these denials that the IPC changed several clauses regarding the charging of registration fees in the contract relating to the 2004 Summer Paralympic Games and led to delays in the signing of the host city contract. Dominican Republic, Luxembourg, and Mauritius, who send delegations to Atlanta, did not classify athletes to compete in Sydney.

- Algeria (8)
- Angola (1)
- Argentina (43)
- Armenia (4)
- Australia (286)
- Austria (52)
- Azerbaijan (7)
- Bahrain (3)
- Barbados (1)
- Belarus (23)
- Belgium (30)
- Benin (1)
- Bermuda (2)
- Bosnia and Herzegovina (13)
- Brazil (63)
- Bulgaria (4)
- Burkina Faso (1)
- Cambodia (11)
- Canada (166)
- Chile (4)
- China (87)
- Chinese Taipei (25)
- Colombia (3)
- Costa Rica (1)
- Croatia (15)
- Cuba (10)
- Cyprus (4)
- Czech Republic (57)
- Denmark (38)
- Ecuador (3)
- Egypt (45)
- El Salvador (1)
- Estonia (10)
- Faroe Islands (2)
- Fiji (1)
- Finland (49)
- France (146)
- Germany (251)
- Great Britain (214)
- Greece (44)
- Honduras (1)
- Hong Kong (28)
- Hungary (54)
- Iceland (6)
- India (4)
- Individual Paralympic Athletes (2)
- Indonesia (4)
- Iran (40)
- Iraq (3)
- Ireland (38)
- Israel (33)
- Italy (67)
- Ivory Coast (2)
- Jamaica (5)
- Japan (151)
- Jordan (7)
- Kazakhstan (2)
- Kenya (13)
- Kuwait (26)
- Kyrgyzstan (2)
- Laos (2)
- Latvia (5)
- Lebanon (2)
- Lesotho (2)
- Libya (17)
- Lithuania (17)
- Macau (2)
- Macedonia (2)
- Madagascar (1)
- Malaysia (10)
- Mali (1)
- Mauritania (2)
- Mexico (77)
- Moldova (6)
- Mongolia (2)
- Morocco (7)
- Netherlands (102)
- New Zealand (42)
- Nigeria (29)
- Norway (39)
- Oman (3)
- Pakistan (1)
- Palestine (2)
- Panama (1)
- Papua New Guinea (3)
- Peru (4)
- Philippines (2)
- Poland (113)
- Portugal (52)
- Puerto Rico (3)
- Qatar (3)
- Romania (1)
- Russia (89)
- Rwanda (1)
- Samoa (1)
- Saudi Arabia (4)
- Singapore (3)
- Slovakia (46)
- Slovenia (17)
- South Africa (66)
- South Korea (89)
- Spain (210)
- Sri Lanka (3)
- Sweden (87)
- Switzerland (54)
- Syria (4)
- Thailand (41)
- Tonga (1)
- Tunisia (10)
- Turkey (1)
- Turkmenistan (1)
- Uganda (1)
- Ukraine (67)
- United Arab Emirates (14)
- United States (267)
- Uruguay (2)
- Vanuatu (2)
- Venezuela (10)
- Vietnam (2)
- Yugoslavia (5)
- Zambia (2)
- Zimbabwe (3)

== See also ==
- 2000 Summer Olympics
- 2032 Summer Paralympics
- Cheating at the Paralympic Games
- 2000 Summer Paralympics medal table

== Bibliography ==
- Sydney Paralympic Organising Committee Annual Report. 1995–2000

Preceded by Atlanta	Summer Paralympics; Sydney; XI Paralympic Summer Games (2000)	Succeeded by Athens
