= Athletics at the 2004 Summer Paralympics – Men's shot put F32–38 =

Athens 2004 Summer Paralympics

Men's shot put events for athletes with cerebral palsy were held at the 2004 Summer Paralympics in the Athens Olympic Stadium. Events were held in six disability classes.

== F32 ==
Men's Shot Put F32 at the XII Paralympic Games
- Venue: Athens Olympic Stadium
- Dates: 19 September 2004
- Competitors: 8 from 7 nations
- Winning distance: 7.64

Medalists
1st place, gold medalist(s)		Karim Betina	Algeria
2nd place, silver medalist(s)		Mana Abdulla Sulaiman	United Arab Emirates
3rd place, bronze medalist(s)		Dhari Al-Mutairi	Kuwait

The F32 event was won by Karim Betina, representing Algeria.

19 Sept. 2004, 20:00

Rank	Athlete	Result	Notes
1st place, gold medalist(s)	Karim Betina (ALG)	7.64	WR
2nd place, silver medalist(s)	Mana Abdulla Sulaiman (UAE)	7.18	
3rd place, bronze medalist(s)	Dhari Al-Mutairi (KUW)	6.86	
4	Andrew Williams (GBR)	6.49	
5	Ahmed Abdullah (KUW)	6.38	
6	Park Se Ho (KOR)	5.97	
7	Tom Leahy (IRL)	5.96	
8	Ahmed Kamal (BRN)	5.70	

== F33-34 ==
Men's Shot Put F33-34 at the XII Paralympic Games
- Venue: Athens Olympic Stadium
- Dates: 21 September 2004
- Competitors: 12 from 9 nations
- Winning distance: 10.26

Medalists
1st place, gold medalist(s)		Roman Musil	Czech Republic
2nd place, silver medalist(s)		Hamish MacDonald	Australia
3rd place, bronze medalist(s)		Mohsen Amoo	Iran

The F33-34 event was won by Roman Musil, representing Czech Republic.

21 Sept. 2004, 18:30

Rank	Athlete	Result	Points	Notes
1st place, gold medalist(s)	Roman Musil (CZE)	10.26	1069	PR
2nd place, silver medalist(s)	Hamish MacDonald (AUS)	11.16	1056	WR
3rd place, bronze medalist(s)	Mohsen Amoo (IRI)	9.30	969	
4	Daniel West (GBR)	10.16	961	
5	Evangelos Bakolas (GRE)	9.10	846	
6	Athanasios Koltsidas (GRE)	9.06	944	
7	Khamis Masood Abdullah (UAE)	9.80	927	
8	Terry Falevaai (NZL)	9.37	887	
9	Siamak Salehfarajzadeh (IRI)	8.76	829	
10	Ahmad Makhseed (KUW)	7.63	795	
11	Maciej Sochal (POL)	5.69	593	
12	Juma Salem Hassan Ali (UAE)	5.36	536	

== F35 ==
Men's Shot Put F35 at the XII Paralympic Games
- Venue: Athens Olympic Stadium
- Dates: 20 September 2004
- Competitors: 10 from 7 nations
- Winning distance: 14.20

Medalists
1st place, gold medalist(s)		Guo Wei	China
2nd place, silver medalist(s)		Edgars Bergs	Latvia
3rd place, bronze medalist(s)		Thierry Cibone	France

The F35 event was won by Guo Wei, representing China.

20 Sept. 2004, 09:00

Rank	Athlete	Result	Notes
1st place, gold medalist(s)	Guo Wei (CHN)	14.20	PR
2nd place, silver medalist(s)	Edgars Bergs (LAT)	13.55	
3rd place, bronze medalist(s)	Thierry Cibone (FRA)	13.43	
4	Fu Xin Han (CHN)	12.63	
5	Paul Williams (GBR)	11.59	
6	Yan Feng (CHN)	10.98	
7	Piotr Sikorski (POL)	10.84	
8	Shane Risto (CAN)	10.52	
9	Kyle Pettey (CAN)	10.17	
10	Bernhard Eitzinger (AUT)	9.59	

== F36 ==
Men's Shot Put F36 at the XII Paralympic Games
- Venue: Athens Olympic Stadium
- Dates: 27 September 2004
- Competitors: 9 from 8 nations
- Winning distance: 12.12

Medalists
1st place, gold medalist(s)		Pawel Piotrowski	Poland
2nd place, silver medalist(s)		Willem Noorduin	Netherlands
3rd place, bronze medalist(s)		Nicholas Larionow	Australia

The F36 event was won by Pawel Piotrowski, representing Poland.

27 Sept. 2004, 19:00

Rank	Athlete	Result	Notes
1st place, gold medalist(s)	Pawel Piotrowski (POL)	12.12	
2nd place, silver medalist(s)	Willem Noorduin (NED)	11.88	
3rd place, bronze medalist(s)	Nicholas Larionow (AUS)	11.17	
4	Kim Dae Kwan (KOR)	10.88	
5	Nicholas Newman (RSA)	10.08	
6	Duane Strydom (RSA)	9.82	
7	Carlos Munoz (ESP)	9.55	
8	Panagiotis Angeletos (GRE)	8.98	
	Wolfgang Dubin (AUT)	DSQ	

== F37 ==
Men's Shot Put F37 at the XII Paralympic Games
- Venue: Athens Olympic Stadium
- Dates: 23 September 2004
- Competitors: 8 from 6 nations
- Winning distance: 14.83

Medalists
1st place, gold medalist(s)		Tomasz Blatkiewicz	Poland
2nd place, silver medalist(s)		Ahmed Meshaima	Bahrain
3rd place, bronze medalist(s)		Robert Chyra	Poland

The F37 event was won by Tomasz Blatkiewicz, representing Poland.

23 Sept. 2004, 17:00

Rank	Athlete	Result	Notes
1st place, gold medalist(s)	Tomasz Blatkiewicz (POL)	14.83	WR
2nd place, silver medalist(s)	Ahmed Meshaima (BRN)	13.28	
3rd place, bronze medalist(s)	Robert Chyra (POL)	12.80	
4	Abbas Mohseni (IRI)	12.59	
5	Mostafa Ahmed (EGY)	11.46	
6	Damien Burroughs (AUS)	10.78	
7	Nasrullah Khan (PAK)	7.31	
8	Zubair Khan (PAK)	7.05	

== F38 ==
Men's Shot Put F38 at the XII Paralympic Games
- Venue: Athens Olympic Stadium
- Dates: 20 September 2004
- Competitors: 9 from 7 nations
- Winning distance: 14.87

Medalists
1st place, gold medalist(s)		Oleksandr Doroshenko	Ukraine
2nd place, silver medalist(s)		Thomas Loosch	Germany
3rd place, bronze medalist(s)		Dušan Grézl	Czech Republic

The F38 event was won by Oleksandr Doroshenko, representing Ukraine.

20 Sept. 2004, 18:45

Rank	Athlete	Result	Notes
1st place, gold medalist(s)	Oleksandr Doroshenko (UKR)	14.87	WR
2nd place, silver medalist(s)	Thomas Loosch (GER)	14.54	
3rd place, bronze medalist(s)	Dušan Grézl (CZE)	13.19	
4	Javad Herdani (IRI)	12.12	
5	Miroslav Janecek (CZE)	12.11	
6	Roman Kolek (CZE)	11.72	
7	James Shaw (CAN)	11.56	
8	Fabian Michaels (RSA)	9.68	
9	Brian Harvey (AUS)	9.61	
