= Athletics at the 2004 Summer Paralympics – Men's discus throw F32–38 =

Men's discus throw events for athletes with cerebral palsy were held at the 2004 Summer Paralympics in the Athens Olympic Stadium. Events were held in six disability classes, F32 being held jointly with F51 wheelchair athletes.

== F32/51 ==
Men's Discus F32/51 at the XII Paralympic Games
- Venue: Athens Olympic Stadium
- Dates: 24 September 2004
- Competitors: 8 from 6 nations
- Winning distance: 9.77

Medalists
1st place, gold medalist(s)		Radim Běleš	Czech Republic
2nd place, silver medalist(s)		John McCarthy	Ireland
3rd place, bronze medalist(s)		Dave Gale	Great Britain

The F32/51 event was won by Radim Běleš, representing Czech Republic.

24 Sept. 2004, 18:00

Rank	Athlete	Result	Points	Notes
1st place, gold medalist(s)	Radim Běleš (CZE)	9.77	1082	
2nd place, silver medalist(s)	John McCarthy (IRL)	9.74	1078	
3rd place, bronze medalist(s)	Dave Gale (GBR)	9.41	1042	
4	Richard Schabel (GBR)	9.20	1019	
5	Miroslav Matic (CRO)	8.26	915	
6	Ahmed Kamal (BRN)	16.29	890	PR
7	Ayman Al Heddi (BRN)	15.86	866	
	Karim Betina (ALG)	DNS		

== F33-34 ==
Men's Discus F33-34 at the XII Paralympic Games
- Venue: Athens Olympic Stadium
- Dates: 20 September 2004
- Competitors: 9 from 7 nations
- Winning distance: 39.12

Medalists
1st place, gold medalist(s)		Siamak Salehfarajzadeh	Iran
2nd place, silver medalist(s)		Daniel West	Great Britain
3rd place, bronze medalist(s)		Mohammad Bin Dabbas	United Arab Emirates

The F33-34 event was won by Siamak Salehfarajzadeh, representing Iran.

20 Sept. 2004, 18:45

Rank	Athlete	Result	Points	Notes
1st place, gold medalist(s)	Siamak Salehfarajzadeh (IRI)	39.12	866	WR
2nd place, silver medalist(s)	Daniel West (GBR)	36.76	867	
3rd place, bronze medalist(s)	Mohammad Bin Dabbas (UAE)	35.81	868	
4	Christopher Martin (GBR)	28.16	869	PR
5	Roman Musil (CZE)	26.24	870	
6	Hamish MacDonald (AUS)	29.23	871	
7	Ahmad Makhseed (KUW)	19.34	872	
8	Juma Salem Hassan Ali (UAE)	17.00	873	
9	Evangelos Bakolas (GRE)	16.86	874	

== F35 ==
Men's Discus F35 at the XII Paralympic Games
- Venue: Athens Olympic Stadium
- Dates: 24 September 2004
- Competitors: 10 from 9 nations
- Winning distance: 43.33

Medalists
1st place, gold medalist(s)		Yan Feng	China
2nd place, silver medalist(s)		Fu Xin Han	China
3rd place, bronze medalist(s)		Edgars Bergs	Latvia

The F35 event was won by Yan Feng, representing China.

24 Sept. 2004, 17:00

Rank	Athlete	Result	Notes
1st place, gold medalist(s)	Yan Feng (CHN)	43.33	PR
2nd place, silver medalist(s)	Fu Xin Han (CHN)	41.61	
3rd place, bronze medalist(s)	Edgars Bergs (LAT)	40.71	
4	Thierry Cibone (FRA)	40.22	
5	Kyle Pettey (CAN)	38.05	
6	Sergiy Kolos (UKR)	35.13	
7	Piotr Sikorski (POL)	32.39	
8	Bernhard Eitzinger (AUT)	29.52	
9	Fabian Michaels (RSA)	28.48	
10	Ernesto Margni (ARG)	26.81	

== F36 ==
Men's Discus F36 at the XII Paralympic Games
- Venue: Athens Olympic Stadium
- Dates: 24 September 2004
- Competitors: 7 from 7 nations
- Winning distance: 35.25

Medalists
1st place, gold medalist(s)		Milan Kubala	Czech Republic
2nd place, silver medalist(s)		Willem Noorduin	Netherlands
3rd place, bronze medalist(s)		Duane Strydom	South Africa

The F36 event was won by Milan Kubala, representing Czech Republic.

24 Sept. 2004, 21:00

Rank	Athlete	Result	Notes
1st place, gold medalist(s)	Milan Kubala (CZE)	35.25	
2nd place, silver medalist(s)	Willem Noorduin (NED)	33.33	
3rd place, bronze medalist(s)	Duane Strydom (RSA)	32.96	
4	Pawel Piotrowski (POL)	32.94	
5	Kim Dae Kwan (KOR)	29.97	
6	Wolfgang Dubin (AUT)	29.84	
7	Nicholas Larionow (AUS)	27.92	

== F37 ==
Men's Discus F37 at the XII Paralympic Games
- Venue: Athens Olympic Stadium
- Dates: 21 September 2004
- Competitors: 7 from 6 nations
- Winning distance: 51.75

Medalists
1st place, gold medalist(s)		Tomasz Blatkiewicz	Poland
2nd place, silver medalist(s)		Haissem Ben Halima	Tunisia
3rd place, bronze medalist(s)		Mostafa Ahmed	Egypt

The F37 event was won by Tomasz Blatkiewicz, representing Poland.

21 Sept. 2004, 17:00

Rank	Athlete	Result	Notes
1st place, gold medalist(s)	Tomasz Blatkiewicz (POL)	51.75	WR
2nd place, silver medalist(s)	Haissem Ben Halima (TUN)	49.56	
3rd place, bronze medalist(s)	Mostafa Ahmed (EGY)	47.25	
4	Robert Chyra (POL)	46.25	
5	Damien Burroughs (AUS)	42.44	
6	Ahmed Meshaima (BRN)	37.12	
7	El Sadig Ashim Baien (SUD)	30.71	

== F38 ==
Men's Discus F38 at the XII Paralympic Games
- Venue: Athens Olympic Stadium
- Dates: 22 September 2004
- Competitors: 8 from 6 nations
- Winning distance: 44.58

Medalists
1st place, gold medalist(s)		Oleksandr Doroshenko	Ukraine
2nd place, silver medalist(s)		Javad Herdani	Iran
3rd place, bronze medalist(s)		Thomas Loosch	Germany

The F38 event was won by Oleksandr Doroshenko, representing Ukraine.

22 Sept. 2004, 09:00

Rank	Athlete	Result	Notes
1st place, gold medalist(s)	Oleksandr Doroshenko (UKR)	44.58	WR
2nd place, silver medalist(s)	Javad Herdani (IRI)	43.27	
3rd place, bronze medalist(s)	Thomas Loosch (GER)	41.19	
4	Petr Vratil (CZE)	38.51	
5	James Shaw (CAN)	37.42	
6	Roman Kolek (CZE)	36.28	
7	Dušan Grézl (CZE)	35.42	
8	Brian Harvey (AUS)	28.71	
