= Athletics at the 2004 Summer Paralympics – Men's javelin throw F35–38 =

Men's javelin throw events for athletes with cerebral palsy were held at the 2004 Summer Paralympics in the Athens Olympic Stadium. Events were held in three disability classes.

== F35 ==
Men's Javelin F35 at the XII Paralympic Games
- Venue: Athens Olympic Stadium
- Dates: 25 September 2004
- Competitors: 9 from 7 nations
- Winning distance: 46.06

Medalists
1st place, gold medalist(s)		Guo Wei	China
2nd place, silver medalist(s)		Fabian Michaels	South Africa
3rd place, bronze medalist(s)		Thierry Cibone	France

The F35 event was won by Guo Wei, representing China.

25 Sept. 2004, 17:00

Rank	Athlete	Result	Notes
1st place, gold medalist(s)	Guo Wei (CHN)	46.06	WR
2nd place, silver medalist(s)	Fabian Michaels (RSA)	42.22	
3rd place, bronze medalist(s)	Thierry Cibone (FRA)	41.73	
4	Faouzi Rzig (TUN)	39.75	
5	Li Weichun (CHN)	38.82	
6	Sergiy Kolos (UKR)	36.73	
7	Eric Flemming (CAN)	33.16	
8	Yan Feng (CHN)	27.17	
9	Bernhard Eitzinger (AUT)	26.28	

== F36/38 ==
Men's Javelin F36/38 at the XII Paralympic Games
- Venue: Athens Olympic Stadium
- Dates: 23 September 2004
- Competitors: 8 from 6 nations
- Winning distance: 38.09

Medalists
1st place, gold medalist(s)		Nicholas Newman	South Africa
2nd place, silver medalist(s)		Pawel Piotrowski	Poland
3rd place, bronze medalist(s)		Oleksandr Doroshenko	Ukraine

The F36/38 event was won by Nicholas Newman, representing South Africa.

23 Sept. 2004, 09:00

Rank	Athlete	Result	Notes
1st place, gold medalist(s)	Nicholas Newman (RSA)	38.09	WR
2nd place, silver medalist(s)	Pawel Piotrowski (POL)	37.14	
3rd place, bronze medalist(s)	Oleksandr Doroshenko (UKR)	51.37	WR
4	Thomas Loosch (GER)	50.89	
5	Petr Vratil (CZE)	42.49	
6	Dušan Grézl (CZE)	41.52	
7	Roman Kolek (CZE)	39.27	
8	Brian Harvey (AUS)	37.39	

== F37 ==
Men's Javelin F37 at the XII Paralympic Games
- Venue: Athens Olympic Stadium
- Dates: 27 September 2004
- Competitors: 8 from 7 nations
- Winning distance: 48.09

Medalists
1st place, gold medalist(s)		Kenny Churchill	Great Britain
2nd place, silver medalist(s)		Kieran Ault	Australia
3rd place, bronze medalist(s)		Jacek Przebierala	Poland

The F37 event was won by Kenny Churchill, representing Great Britain.

27 Sept. 2004, 17:00

Rank	Athlete	Result	Notes
1st place, gold medalist(s)	Kenny Churchill (GBR)	48.09	WR
2nd place, silver medalist(s)	Kieran Ault (AUS)	45.77	
3rd place, bronze medalist(s)	Jacek Przebierala (POL)	44.78	
4	Abdel Jabbar Dhifallah (TUN)	43.37	
5	Ahmed Meshaima (BRN)	41.47	
6	Andy Shaw (CAN)	37.86	
7	Han Do Hyung (KOR)	36.71	
8	Damien Burroughs (AUS)	30.56	
