= Athletics at the 2008 Summer Paralympics – Men's shot put F37–38 =

Men's Shot Put F37/38 at the XIII Paralympic Games
- Venue: Beijing National Stadium
- Dates: 13 September
- Competitors: 10 from 9 nations
- Winning distance: 16.60

Medalists
| 1st place, gold medalist(s) | | Xia Dong | China |
| 2nd place, silver medalist(s) | | Tomasz Blatkiewicz | Poland |
| 3rd place, bronze medalist(s) | | Thomas Loosch | Germany |

The men's shot put F37/38 event at the 2008 Summer Paralympics took place at the Beijing National Stadium at 18:20 on 13 September. There was a single round of competition; after the first three throws, only the top eight had 3 further throws. The competition was won by Xia Dong, representing China.

== Results ==
| Rank | Athlete | Nationality | Cl. | 1 | 2 | 3 | 4 | 5 | 6 | Best | Pts. | Notes |
|---|---|---|---|---|---|---|---|---|---|---|---|---|
| 1st place, gold medalist(s) | Xia Dong | China | F37 | 16.60 | 13.77 | - | 15.25 | 14.86 | 15.05 | 16.60 | 1104 | WR |
| 2nd place, silver medalist(s) | Tomasz Blatkiewicz | Poland | F37 | 14.34 | 14.23 | 14.41 | 14.05 | 14.14 | 14.74 | 14.74 | 980 | SB |
| 3rd place, bronze medalist(s) | Thomas Loosch | Germany | F38 | 14.05 | x | 14.44 | x | 14.15 | 14.11 | 14.44 | 968 | |
| 4 | Robert Chyra | Poland | F37 | 11.74 | 12.62 | 13.01 | 12.71 | x | x | 13.01 | 865 | SB |
| 5 | Martin Crutchley | Great Britain | F38 | 11.41 | 12.20 | 12.49 | 11.99 | 12.68 | 12.72 | 12.72 | 853 | |
| 6 | Ahmed Meshaima | Bahrain | F37 | 12.40 | 12.80 | 12.73 | x | 12.62 | 12.58 | 12.80 | 851 | |
| 7 | Mykola Zhabnyak | Ukraine | F37 | 12.65 | 12.39 | 12.63 | 12.14 | 12.68 | 12.73 | 12.73 | 846 | |
| 8 | Hamdi Warfili | Tunisia | F38 | 12.06 | 12.44 | x | 11.83 | 12.56 | 12.42 | 12.56 | 842 | SB |
| 9 | Dušan Grézl | Czech Republic | F38 | x | 12.09 | 11.95 | - | - | - | 12.09 | 810 | |
| 10 | Alexey Lesnykh | Russia | F37 | x | 10.96 | 11.99 | - | - | - | 11.99 | 797 | |

WR = World Record. SB = Seasonal Best.
