= 2019 World Para Athletics Championships – Men's club throw =

The men's club throw at the 2019 World Para Athletics Championships was held in Dubai on 9 November (F32) and 10 November (F51).

== Medalists ==
Event	Gold		Silver		Bronze	
F32	Lahouari Bahlaz; Algeria	33.89	Walid Ferhah; Algeria	33.54 PB	Maciej Sochal; Poland	31.90
F51	Željko Dimitrijević; Serbia	33.82 CR	Mario Santana Ramos Hernandez; Mexico	30.16	Musa Taimazov; Russia	29.29
WR world record | AR area record | CR championship record | GR games record | NR national record | OR Olympic record | PB personal best | SB season best | WL world leading (in a given season)

== Detailed results ==
=== F32 ===
The event was held on 9 November.

Rank	Athlete	#1	#2	#3	#4	#5	#6	Result	
1st place, gold medalist(s)	Lahouari Bahlaz; Algeria	33.89	30.19	32.92	x	x	x	33.89	
2nd place, silver medalist(s)	Walid Ferhah; Algeria	30.29	33.54	32.97	32.64	31.40	31.77	33.54	PB
3rd place, bronze medalist(s)	Maciej Sochal; Poland	x	29.43	28.68	31.90	30.87	28.57	31.90	
4	Athanasios Konstantinidis; Greece	x	x	26.55	26.30	27.61	30.63	30.63	
5	Liu Li; China	18.10	26.88	27.66	30.07	29.14	27.92	30.07	
6	František Serbus; Czech Republic	28.71	28.13	x	x	26.15	x	28.71	
7	Ahmed Mehideb; Algeria	x	25.24	27.30	27.26	28.34	27.07	28.34	
8	Dimitrios Zisidis; Greece	20.71	20.04	x	x	x	-	20.71	

=== F51 ===
The event was held on 10 November.

Rank	Athlete	#1	#2	#3	#4	#5	#6	Result	
1st place, gold medalist(s)	Željko Dimitrijević; Serbia	32.02	28.63	33.73	33.23	33.82	26.39	33.82	CR
2nd place, silver medalist(s)	Mario Santana Ramos Hernandez; Mexico	29.09	30.16	28.20	29.05	29.22	29.15	30.16	
3rd place, bronze medalist(s)	Musa Taimazov; Russia	29.05	x	x	x	29.29	23.21	29.29	
4	Marián Kuřeja; Slovakia	27.45	28.18	28.95	29.17	29.01	x	29.17	
5	Amit Kumar Saroha; India	27.26	26.72	28.05	27.90	29.16	29.07	29.16	
6	Michal Enge; Czech Republic	x	26.70	x	24.19	25.41	27.45	27.45	
7	Martin Zach; Czech Republic	27.09	23.41	26.64	25.36	26.23	25.24	27.09	
8	Dharambir Dharambir; India	x	22.79	23.05	26.37	x	25.58	26.37	
9	Radim Běleš; Czech Republic	24.40	24.76	25.10	25.36	25.25	24.61	25.36	

== See also ==
- List of IPC world records in athletics
