= 2021 World Para Athletics European Championships – Men's club throw =

Two men's club throw events were held at the 2021 World Para Athletics European Championships in Bydgoszcz, Poland.

== Medalists ==
Event	Gold		Silver		Bronze	
F32	Frantisek Serbus (CZE)	34.31 CR	Maciej Sochal (POL)	30.74	Athanasios Konstantinidis (GRE)	29.62
F51	Željko Dimitrijević (SRB)	34.71 WR	Marián Kuřeja (SVK)	31.19 PB	Aleksandar Radišić (SRB)	29.98 PB
WR world record | ER European record | CR championship record | NR national record | WL world leading | EL European leading | PB personal best | SB seasonal best

== See also ==
- List of IPC world records in athletics
