= Bahrain at the Islamic Solidarity Games =

- IOC code: BHR
- NOC: Bahrain Olympic Committee
- Medals Ranked 10th: Gold 39 Silver 24 Bronze 22 Total 85

Islamic Solidarity Games appearances (overview)
- 2005; 2013; 2017; 2021; 2025

Bahrain has taken part in every edition of the Islamic Solidarity Games since the first tournament held in Mecca, 2005. By 2025, data from the Islamic Solidarity Sports Federation shows that Bahraini competitors have secured 85 medals in total — including 39 gold, 24 silver, and 22 bronze. Overall, Bahrain holds the top 10th position in the medal table as off the last Islamic Solidarity Games held in Riyadh, Saudi Arabia.

== Medal tables ==
=== Medals by Islamic Solidarity Games ===
Host nation

Below is the table representing all Bahraini medals in the games. Until now, Bahrain has won 85 medals (39 gold, 24 silver, and 22 bronze).

Games	Athletes	Gold	Silver	Bronze	Total	Rank	Notes	RF
(Saudi Arabia) 2005 Mecca		0	0	0	0	-	details	
(Iran) 2010 Tehran	Canceled							
(Indonesia) 2013 Palembang		2	1	4	7	11th	details	
(Azerbaijan) 2017 Baku		12	5	4	21	5th	details	
(Turkey) 2021 Konya		9	7	7	23	8th	details	
(Saudi Arabia) 2025 Riyadh		16	11	7	34	6th	details	
(Malaysia) 2029 Selangor	Future event							
Total		39	24	22	85	10th	-	-

== See also ==
- Bahrain at the Olympics
- Bahrain at the Paralympics
- Bahrain at the Asian Games
- Bahrain at the Arab Games
- Sports in Bahrain
