= 2012 IPC Athletics European Championships – Men's club throw =

The men's club throw at the 2012 IPC Athletics European Championships was held at Stadskanaal Stadium from 24 to 28 July.

== Medalists ==
Results given by IPC Athletics.

Class	Gold	Silver	Bronze
F32	Stephen Miller; United Kingdom	Frantisek Serbus; Czech Republic	Slaven Hudina; Croatia
F51	Zeljko Dimitrijevic; Serbia	Miroslav Matic; Croatia	N/A

== Results ==
=== F32 ===
Rank	Class	Athlete	1	2	3	4	5	6	Best	Notes
1st place, gold medalist(s)	F32	Stephen Miller; United Kingdom	23.21	27.64	29.10	27.41	25.66	24.26	29.10	
2nd place, silver medalist(s)	F32	Frantisek Serbus; Czech Republic	22.05	X	26.08	X	26.01	X	26.08	
3rd place, bronze medalist(s)	F32	Slaven Hudina; Croatia	X	X	24.84	X	X	X	24.84	
4	F32	Maciej Sochal; Poland	X	X	21.36	X	X	X	21.36	

=== F51 ===
Rank	Class	Athlete	1	2	3	4	5	6	Best	Notes
1st place, gold medalist(s)	F51	Zeljko Dimitrijevic; Serbia	25.68	X	25.10	X	17.72	23.33	25.68	
2nd place, silver medalist(s)	F51	Miroslav Matic; Croatia	17.71	X	19.34	X	20.72	X	20.72	
3	F51	Joze Flere; Slovenia	16.65	14.44	18.81	X	X	X	18.81	

== See also ==
- List of IPC world records in athletics
