= Bahrain at the 2012 Summer Paralympics =

- IPC code: BRN
- NPC: Bahrain Disabled Sports Federation

in London
- Competitors: 2 in 1 sport
- Medals: Gold 0 Silver 0 Bronze 0 Total 0

Summer Paralympics appearances (overview)
- 1984; 1988; 1992; 1996; 2000; 2004; 2008; 2012; 2016; 2020; 2024

Bahrain competed at the 2012 Summer Paralympics in London, United Kingdom from August 29 to September 9, 2012.

== Athletics ==
Men’s Field Events

Athlete	Event	Distance	Points	Rank
Ahmed Meshaima	Shot Put F37-38	13.52	—	9
Ahmed Meshaima	Discus Throw F37-38	40.21	859	11

Women’s Field Events

Athlete	Event	Distance	Points	Rank
Fatema Nedham	Discus Throw F51-53	9.83	375	8
Fatema Nedham	Javelin Throw F33-34/52-53	6.07	—	13

== See also ==
- Bahrain at the 2012 Summer Olympics
