= Bahrain at the Arab Games =

- IOC code: BHR
- NOC: Bahrain Olympic Committee
- Medals Ranked 12th: Gold 44 Silver 31 Bronze 56 Total 131

Arab Games appearances (overview)
- 1976; 1985; 1992; 1997; 1999; 2004; 2007; 2011; 2023; 2027

Bahrain has taken part in every edition of the Arab Games since the fifth Edition held in 1976 in Damascus, Syria. By 2023, data from the Union of Arab National Olympic Committees shows that Bahraini competitors have secured 131 medals in total — including 44 gold, 31 silver, and 56 bronze. Overall, Bahrain holds the top 12th position in the medal table as off the last Arab Games held in Algeria.

== Medal tables ==
=== Medals by Arab Games ===
Host nation

Below is a table representing all Bahraini medals around the games. Till now, Bahrain has won 131 medals around the games history.

Games	Gold	Silver	Bronze	Total	Rank	Notes	RF
(Egypt) 1953 Alexandria	Did not participate						
(Lebanon) 1957 Beirut	Did not participate						
(Morocco) 1961 Casablanca	Did not participate						
(Egypt) 1965 Cairo	Did not participate						
(Syria) 1976 Damascus	0	0	13	13	8th	details	
(Morocco) 1985 Rabat	4	1	0	5	7th	details	
(Syria) 1992 Damascus	1	0	1	2	13th	details	
(Lebanon) 1997 Beirut	0	0	1	1	17th	details	
(Jordan) 1999 Amman	1	1	4	6	13th	details	
(Algeria) 2004 Algiers	2	1	3	6	16th	details	
(Egypt) 2007 Cairo	6	5	10	21	13th	details	
(Qatar) 2011 Doha	12	12	14	38	8th	details	
(Algeria) 2023 Algiers (5 cities)	19	11	12	42	4th	details	
Total	44	31	56	131	12th	–	

== See also ==
- Bahrain at the Olympics
- Bahrain at the Paralympics
- Bahrain at the Asian Games
- Bahrain at the Islamic Solidarity Games
- Sports in Bahrain
