= Dan West (athlete) =

British Paralympic discus thrower and shot putter

Personal information
- Full name: Daniel West
- Nationality: British
- Born: 15 December 1977 (age 48) Cambridge, England

Sport
- Country: Great Britain
- Sport: Athletics
- Event(s): F34 Shot put F34 Discus
- Club: Notts
- Coached by: Jim Edwards

Achievements and titles
- Paralympic finals: 1996, 2000, 2004, 2008, 2012
- Personal best(s): Shot Put: 11.37m Discus: 38.16m
Medal record
Men's disability athletics
Representing Great Britain
Paralympic Games
Silver medal – second place	2004 Athens	Discus throw – F33–34
Bronze medal – third place	1996 Atlanta	Shot put – F32–33
Bronze medal – third place	2000 Sydney	Discus throw – F34
Representing England
Commonwealth Games
Silver medal – second place	2010 Delhi	Shot Put (F32/34/52)

Daniel West (born 15 December 1977) is a British Paralympian track and field athlete competing mainly in category F34 throwing events. He has represented Great Britain in four Paralympic Games and has qualified for the team for a fifth time at the 2012 Summer Paralympics. West has two bronze Paralympic medals and one silver, all in the shot put, and has medalled in the IPC World Championships and the Commonwealth Games.

== Biography ==
West was born in Cambridge, England in 1977. West, who has cerebral palsy, credits his parents for instilling in him a love of sport, and in his younger days engaged in both wheelchair basketball and swimming. He switched to athletics as a teenager, citing a preference to individual sports, and took to the throwing events, specialising in both the discus and shot put.

West was selected at the age of 18 to represent Great Britain in the 1996 Summer Paralympics in Atlanta at both shot and discus. He finished 8th in discus but his third place in the shot put saw him collect the bronze medal. Despite the medal, West, who was the world number one in the shot going into the games, saw his result as a disappointment and spurred him to improve his training. Two years later he was again representing Great Britain, this time at the World Championships, and again it was his shot that was the stronger of the two events, collecting the silver medal. In 2000 West was reselected for the Paralympics, again entering the shot and discus. He again won a bronze medal, but this time in the discus.

In 2002, another World Championship resulted in another two medals, silver in the shot put and bronze in the discus. With a shot put bronze in the European Games in 2003, West was selected for his third Paralympics, in Athens. His third Paralympics saw him pick up his third medal, this time a silver in the discus. In 2006 he competed in his most successful event picking up silver in both events at the World Championships in Assen in the Netherlands. In the World Championships West threw a personal best of 38.16m in the discus, only to be beaten to the gold when Saleh Farajzadeh of Iran threw a new world record of 39.98.

I enjoyed the training for athletics. Wheelchair basketball annoyed me because you could play a blinder and if the other four played badly you'd all suffer, but if you throw well you know where the credit lies.

— West describing his reason for switching to individual sports in a 2011 interview for Athletic UK.

West was selected for his fourth Paralympics in 2008, again entering under both sports. West stated in a 2011 interview that the Beijing games were a bad competition and he failed to medal at the games for the first time. On returning to Britain he changed coach, initially teaming up with Mark Edwards in Loughborough before moving training camp to work with Jim Edwards. In a bid to win a gold medal in the 2012 Paralympics, Edwards advised West to concentrate just on the shot put for the London games. The decision appeared to make a difference with West picking up a gold in the shot put in the 2009 Paralympic World Cup, a silver in the 2010 Commonwealth Games and then in the 2011 IPC Athletics World Championships he threw a personal best of 11.37m, only to be beaten to the gold by another World record throw, of 11.53m by Thierry Cibone of France.

In 2012 West was selected for his fifth Paralympics, this time only in the shot put, in London.
