= Bahrain at the 2020 Summer Paralympics =

- Flag of Bahrain
- IPC code: BRN
- NPC: National Paralympic Committee Bahrain

in Tokyo, Japan August 24, 2021 – September 5, 2021
- Competitors: 2 (1 man and 1 woman) in 1 sport
- Medals: Gold 0 Silver 0 Bronze 0 Total 0

Summer Paralympics appearances (overview)
- 1984; 1988; 1992; 1996; 2000; 2004; 2008; 2012; 2016; 2020; 2024

Bahrain competed at the 2020 Summer Paralympics in Tokyo, Japan, from 24 August to 5 September 2021. This was their tenth consecutive appearance at the Summer Paralympics since 1984.

== Competitors ==
The following is the list of number of competitors participating in the Games:

Sport	Men	Women	Total
Athletics	1	1	2

== Athletics ==
Men's field

Athlete	Event	Final	
Athlete	Event	Result	Rank
Ahmed Meshaima	Javelin throw F38	38.42	8

Women's field

Athlete	Event	Final	
Athlete	Event	Result	Rank
Rooba Alomari	Discus throw F55	23.11	5

== See also ==
- Bahrain at the Paralympics
- Bahrain at the 2020 Summer Olympics
