= Athletics at the 2020 Summer Paralympics – Men's club throw =

The Men's club throw athletics events for the 2020 Summer Paralympics took place at the Tokyo National Stadium on August 28 and September 1, 2021. A total of 2 events were contested in this discipline.

== Schedule ==
| R | Round 1 | ½ | Semifinals | F | Final |

| Date | Sat 28 | | Sun 29 | | Mon 30 | | Tue 31 | | Wed 1 | |
| Event | M | E | M | E | M | E | M | E | M | E |
|---|---|---|---|---|---|---|---|---|---|---|
| F32 | | F | | | | | | | | |
| F51 | | | | | | | | | | F |

== Medal summary ==
The following is a summary of the medals awarded across all club throw events.

| Classification | Gold | | Silver | | Bronze | |
|---|---|---|---|---|---|---|
| F32 | Liu Li; China | 45.39 WR | Athanasios Konstantinidis; Greece | 38.68 AR | Walid Ferhah; Algeria | 35.34 AR |
| F51 | Musa Taimazov; RPC | 35.42 WR | Željko Dimitrijević; Serbia | 35.29 | Marián Kuřeja; Slovakia | 30.66 |

== Results ==
=== F32 ===
Records

Prior to this competition, the existing world, Paralympic, and area records were as follows:

| World record | Maciej Sochal (POL) | 37.19 | Grosseto, Italy | 14 June 2016 |
| Paralympic record | Liu Li (CHN) | 45.39 | Tokyo, Japan | 28 August 2021 |

| Area | Distance (m) | Athlete | Nation |
|---|---|---|---|
| Africa | 34.46 | Lahouari Bahlaz | Algeria |
| America | 20.78 | Esteban Abraham Vazquez Estrada | Mexico |
| Asia | 45.39 WR | Liu Li | China |
| Europe | 37.19 | Maciej Sochal | Poland |
| Oceania | Vacant | | |

Results

The final in this classification took place on 28 August 2021, at 19:05:

| Rank | Athlete | Nationality | 1 | 2 | 3 | 4 | 5 | 6 | Best | Notes |
|---|---|---|---|---|---|---|---|---|---|---|
| 1st place, gold medalist(s) | Liu Li | China | 36.97 | 39.13 | x | 39.37 | 45.39 | x | 45.39 | WR |
| 2nd place, silver medalist(s) | Athanasios Konstantinidis | Greece | 35.70 | 38.68 | x | x | 38.51 | x | 38.68 | AR |
| 3rd place, bronze medalist(s) | Walid Ferhah | Algeria | 31.03 | 34.73 | 35.34 | 31.92 | x | x | 35.34 | AR |
| 4 | Aleksei Churkin | RPC | x | x | x | x | 34.82 | 34.05 | 34.82 | PB |
| 5 | Lahouari Bahlaz | Algeria | 31.47 | x | 33.06 | 30.97 | 32.71 | x | 33.06 | SB |
| 6 | Maciej Sochal | Poland | 32.66 | 30.80 | 32.36 | x | x | 31.17 | 32.66 | SB |
| 7 | František Serbus | Czech Republic | x | 32.53 | 32.19 | 31.84 | 31.69 | x | 32.53 | |
| 8 | Ahmed Mehideb | Algeria | x | 28.91 | x | x | 31.34 | 31.18 | 31.34 | PB |
| 9 | Mohammed Al Mashaykhi | Oman | x | x | 30.59 | 26.15 | 23.95 | 30.29 | 30.59 | SB |
| 10 | Abdennacer Feidi | Tunisia | 28.00 | x | 30.24 | x | x | 28.52 | 30.24 | |

=== F51 ===
Records

Prior to this competition, the existing world, Paralympic, and area records were as follows:

| World record | Željko Dimitrijević (SRB) | 34.71 | Bydgoszcz, Poland | 2 June 2021 |
| Paralympic record | Željko Dimitrijević (SRB) | 29.96 | Rio de Janeiro, Brazil | 16 September 2016 |

| Area | Distance (m) | Athlete | Nation |
|---|---|---|---|
| Africa | 26.24 | Walid Rezouani | Algeria |
| America | 30.34 | Mario Santano Ramos Hernandez | Mexico |
| Asia | 30.25 | Amit Kumar Saroha | India |
| Europe | 34.71 WR | Željko Dimitrijević | Serbia |
| Oceania | Vacant | | |

Results

The final in this classification took place on 1 September 2021, at 19:25:

| Rank | Athlete | Nationality | 1 | 2 | 3 | 4 | 5 | 6 | Best | Notes |
|---|---|---|---|---|---|---|---|---|---|---|
| 1st place, gold medalist(s) | Musa Taimazov | RPC | 35.42 | 34.40 | 34.47 | x | x | 34.75 | 35.42 | WR |
| 2nd place, silver medalist(s) | Željko Dimitrijević | Serbia | 34.20 | 33.09 | 34.95 | 35.21 | 33.03 | 35.29 | 35.29 | PB |
| 3rd place, bronze medalist(s) | Marián Kuřeja | Slovakia | x | x | x | 27.51 | 30.66 | 29.23 | 30.66 | |
| 4 | Mario Santana Ramos Hernandez | Mexico | x | x | x | 29.41 | 30.25 | x | 30.25 | SB |
| 5 | Amit Kumar Saroha | India | 25.41 | 27.77 | 24.86 | x | x | 26.68 | 27.77 | SB |
| 6 | Uladzislau Hryb | Belarus | 26.86 | 20.00 | x | x | 27.47 | 21.72 | 27.47 | PB |
| 7 | Michal Enge | Czech Republic | 25.70 | 26.75 | 26.52 | 26.48 | 25.19 | 26.24 | 26.75 | |
| 8 | Dharambir Dharambir | India | x | x | x | x | 25.59 | x | 25.59 | SB |
