= Vladislav Frolov (field athlete) =

Russian Paralympic athlete

Personal information
- Nationality: Russian
- Born: 6 January 1992 (age 34)

Sport
- Sport: Athletics
- Event(s): Club throw, Shot put
- Club: Bryansk State College of Olympic Reserve
- Coached by: Mikhail Sumichev; Artyom Sumichev

Achievements and titles
- Personal best: club throw: 35.94
Medal record
Representing Russia
Men's Athletics
IPC Athletics World Championships
Gold medal – first place	2015 Doha	Club throw - F32
Gold medal – first place	2015 Doha	Shot put - F32
IPC Athletics European Championships
Gold medal – first place	2014 Swansea	Shot put - F32
Gold medal – first place	2014 Swansea	Club throw - F32
Gold medal – first place	2016 Grosseto	Shot put - F32
Silver medal – second place	2016 Grosseto	Club throw - F32

Vladislav Frolov (born 6 January 1992) is a Paralympic athlete from Russia. He competes in seated throwing events in the F32 classification, specializing in the club throw and shot put.

== Athletic career ==
Frolov began training as an athlete at Bryansk in 2008. He came to prominence in 2014 when he represented Russia at the 2014 IPC Athletics European Championships in Swansea. There he entered both the club throw and shot put. In the shot put he threw a distance of 9.02, more than a metre more than his nearest rival to secure his first international gold medal. He followed this with a second gold, when he beat Britain's Stephen Miller in the T32 club throw.

The following year he travelled to Doha to take part in the 2015 IPC Athletics World Championships. In the shot put, as in Swansea, he dominated the field, winning comfortably with a distance of 9.02m. He followed this with a victory in the club throw, where he threw 35.94 to better his own world record he had set four months earlier.

In the run up to the Summer Paralympics in Rio Frolov competed at the 2016 IPC Athletics European Championships in Grosseto. He successfully defended his shot put title, but suffered his first major international defeat in the club throw, where despite recording a personal best of 36.13, he was beaten into second place by a new world record thrown by Poland's Maciej Sochal.
