= Athletics at the 2016 Summer Paralympics – Men's club throw =

The Men's club throw athletics events for the 2016 Summer Paralympics took place at the Estádio Olímpico João Havelange between 13 and 16 September. Two events was contested for the F32 and F51 classifications.

== Results ==
=== F32 ===
The F32 club throw was held on the 13 September and was open to only F32 competitors.

Rank	Athlete	Nationality	Class	1	2	3	4	5	6	Result	Notes
1st place, gold medalist(s)	Maciej Sochal	Poland	F32	33.02	32.41	31.27	X	30.51	33.91	33.91	
2nd place, silver medalist(s)	Athanasios Konstantinidis	Greece	F32	31.30	31.66	33.69	32.82	32.67	32.87	33.69	
3rd place, bronze medalist(s)	Stephen Miller	Great Britain	F32	31.58	31.17	31.93	X	30.70	X	31.93	SB
4	Abdennacer Feidi	Tunisia	F32	22.40	29.55	27.88	26.93	30.75	X	30.75	PB
5	Nikolaos Gonios	Greece	F32	24.69	26.57	X	24.03	26.53	27.26	27.26	
6	Dimitrios Zisidis	Greece	F32	21.21	X	19.13	X	X	22.24	22.24	
7	Mohammed Al Mashaykhi	Oman	F32	-	-	-	-	-	-	DNS	
8	Lahouari Bahlaz	Algeria	F32	-	-	-	-	-	-	DNS	
9	Abderrahim Missouni	Algeria	F32	-	-	-	-	-	-	DNS	
10	Mounir Bakiri	Algeria	F32	-	-	-	-	-	-	DNS	

=== F51 ===
The F51 club throw was held on the 16 September and was only open to F51 competitors.

Rank	Athlete	Nationality	Class	1	2	3	4	5	6	Result	Notes
1st place, gold medalist(s)	Željko Dimitrijević	Serbia	F51	29.91	29.52	29.73	29.96	27.42	24.54	29.96	WR
2nd place, silver medalist(s)	Miloš Mitić	Serbia	F51	26.34	26.84	25.10	26.21	-	25.99	26.84	PB
3rd place, bronze medalist(s)	Marián Kuřeja	Slovakia	F51	25.35	24.44	26.23	26.04	26.82	X	26.82	
4	Amit Kumar Saroha	India	F51	25.46	26.63	26.23	25.94	25.51	25.98	26.63	RR
5	Radim Běleš	Czech Republic	F51	X	25.82	26.35	26.53	X	X	26.53	SB
6	Martin Zvolánek	Czech Republic	F51	X	21.97	22.03	22.13	24.14	23.41	24.14	SB
7	Mario Santana Ramos Hernandez	Mexico	F51	X	22.37	X	X	24.12	23.41	24.12	
8	Jan Vaněk	Czech Republic	F51	22.89	X	X	22.13	22.63	23.94	23.94	
9	Dharambir	India	F51	21.39	X	20.78				21.39	
