= Bahrain at the 2008 Summer Paralympics =

- IPC code: BRN
- NPC: Bahrain Disabled Sports Federation

in Beijing
- Competitors: 3 in 2 sports
- Flag bearer: Ahmed Meshaimaa
- Medals: Gold 0 Silver 0 Bronze 0 Total 0

Summer Paralympics appearances (overview)
- 1984; 1988; 1992; 1996; 2000; 2004; 2008; 2012; 2016; 2020; 2024

Bahrain sent a delegation to compete at the 2008 Summer Paralympics in Beijing, People's Republic of China.

== Sports ==
=== Athletics ===
==== Men's field ====
Athlete	Class	Event	Final		
Athlete	Class	Event	Result	Points	Rank
Ahmed Meshaima	F37-38	Javelin throw	46.22	960	5
Ahmed Meshaima	F37-38	Shot put	12.80	851	6

==== Women's field ====
Athlete	Class	Event	Final		
Athlete	Class	Event	Result	Points	Rank
Fatema Nedham	F32-34/51-53	Discus throw	8.21	553	18

=== Powerlifting ===
Athlete	Event	Result	Rank
Hasan Alderazi	Men's 67.5kg	132.5	12

== See also ==
- Bahrain at the Paralympics
- Bahrain at the 2008 Summer Olympics
