= Bahrain at the 2024 Summer Paralympics =

- Flag of Bahrain
- IPC code: BRN
- NPC: Bahrain Disabled Sports Federation-Bahrain Paralympic Committee

in Paris, France August 28, 2024 – September 8, 2024
- Competitors: 2 (1 man and 1 woman) in 1 sport
- Flag bearers: Rooba Al-Omari; Husain Mohamed
- Medals: Gold 0 Silver 0 Bronze 0 Total 0

Summer Paralympics appearances (overview)
- 1984; 1988; 1992; 1996; 2000; 2004; 2008; 2012; 2016; 2020; 2024

Bahrain competed at the 2024 Summer Paralympics in Paris, France, from 28 August to 8 September.

== Competitors ==
The following is the list of number of competitors in the Games.

| Sport | Men | Women | Total |
|---|---|---|---|
| Athletics | 1 | 1 | 2 |
| Total | 1 | 1 | 2 |

== Athletics ==
Key

- Note–Ranks given for track events are within the athlete's heat only
- Q = Qualified for the next round
- q = Qualified for the next round as a fastest loser or, in field events, by position without achieving the qualifying target
- DQ = Disqualified
- PR = Paralympic Record
- AR = Area (or continental) Record
- NR = National Record
- SB = Season's Best
- N/A = Round not applicable for the event
- Bye = Athlete not required to compete in round

Track & road events
Men

| Athlete | Event | Heat | | Final | |
| Athlete | Event | Result | Rank | Result | Rank |
|---|---|---|---|---|---|
| Husain Mohamed; Guide:Djimel Abdallah | Men's 400 metres T11 | DSQ | | Did not advance | |

Field event
Women

| Athlete | Event | Final | |
| Athlete | Event | Distance | Position |
|---|---|---|---|
| Rooba Al-Omari | Women's discus throw F55 | 23.24 | 6 |

== See also ==
- Bahrain at the 2024 Summer Olympics
- Bahrain at the Paralympics
