= 2018 World Para Athletics European Championships – Men's club throw =

The men's club throw at the 2018 World Para Athletics European Championships was held at the Friedrich-Ludwig-Jahn-Sportpark in Berlin from 20 to 26 August. Two classification finals are held in all over this event.

== Medalists ==
Event	Gold		Silver		Bronze	
F32	Maciej Sochal (POL)	31.12	Stephen Miller (GBR)	29.78	no medal awarded	
F51	Željko Dimitrijević (SRB)	32.23 CR	Marián Kuřeja (SVK)	28.55	Miloš Mitić (SRB)	27.06
WR world record | AR area record | CR championship record | GR games record | NR national record | OR Olympic record | PB personal best | SB season best | WL world leading (in a given season)

== See also ==
- List of IPC world records in athletics

== See also ==
- List of IPC world records in athletics
