= Miloš Mitić =

Serbian Paralympic athlete (1987–2018)

Personal information
- Born: Miloš Mitić; 4 December 1987 Titovo Užice, SFR Yugoslavia
- Died: 18 September 2018 (aged 30)

Sport
- Country: Serbia
- Sport: Athletics
- Event: Club throw

Achievements and titles
- Personal best: 26.84
Medal record
Representing Serbia
Men's Athletics
Paralympic Games
Silver medal – second place	2016 Rio de Janeiro	Club Throw F31-32/51
IPC Athletics World Championships
Bronze medal – third place	2015 Doha	Club throw - F51
Bronze medal – third place	2017 London	Club throw - F51
IPC Athletics European Championships
Silver medal – second place	2014 Swansea	Club throw - F51
Bronze medal – third place	2018 Berlin	Club Throw - F51

Miloš Mitić (Serbian Cyrillic: Милош Митић), (December 4, 1987 – September 9, 2018) was a Paralympian athlete from Serbia. He competed in Club throw in the F51 classification, a class for quadriplegics.

At the 2016 Summer Paralympics held in Rio, he won a silver medal in athletics.
