= Bahrain at the 1988 Summer Paralympics =

- IPC code: BRN
- NPC: Bahrain Disabled Sports Federation

in Seoul
- Competitors: 11
- Medals Ranked 37th: Gold 1 Silver 1 Bronze 1 Total 3

Summer Paralympics appearances (overview)
- 1984; 1988; 1992; 1996; 2000; 2004; 2008; 2012; 2016; 2020; 2024

Bahrain competed at the 1988 Summer Paralympics in Seoul, South Korea. 11 competitors from Bahrain won 3 medals including 1 gold, 1 silver and 1 bronze and finished 37th in the medal table.

== See also ==
- Bahrain at the Paralympics
- Bahrain at the 1988 Summer Olympics
