= Bahrain at the 1992 Summer Paralympics =

- IPC code: BRN
- NPC: Bahrain Disabled Sports Federation

in Barcelona
- Competitors: 4
- Medals Ranked 55th: Gold 0 Silver 0 Bronze 1 Total 1

Summer Paralympics appearances (overview)
- 1984; 1988; 1992; 1996; 2000; 2004; 2008; 2012; 2016; 2020; 2024

Bahrain competed at the 1992 Summer Paralympics in Barcelona, Spain. 4 competitors from Bahrain won a single bronze medal and finished 50th in the medal table along with five other countries.

== See also ==
- Bahrain at the Paralympics
- Bahrain at the 1992 Summer Olympics
