= Haissem Ben Halima =

Tunisian Paralympic athlete

Medal record

Paralympic athletics

Representing Tunisia

Paralympic Games
Silver medal – second place	2004 Athens	Discus Throw - F37

Haissem Ben Halima is a paralympic athlete from Tunisia competing mainly in category F37 DT events.

Haissem has competed in the discus at the 2000 and 2004 Summer Paralympics winning the silver medal in the F37 class in 2004.
