= Jacek Przebierała =

Polish Paralympic athlete

Medal record

Paralympic athletics

Representing Poland

Paralympic Games
Bronze medal – third place	2000 Sydney	Javelin Throw - F37
Bronze medal – third place	2004 Athens	Javelin Throw - F37

Jacek Przebierała is a paralympic athlete from Poland competing mainly in category F37 discus and javelin events.

Jacek competed in the discus and javelin at the 2000 Summer Paralympics winning a bronze medal in the javelin. He matched this performance, winning a second bronze n the javelin in the 2004 Summer Paralympics.
