= Bahrain at the 2000 Summer Paralympics =

- IPC code: BRN
- NPC: Bahrain Disabled Sports Federation

in Sydney
- Competitors: 3 in 1 sport
- Medals Ranked 58th: Gold 0 Silver 1 Bronze 1 Total 2

Summer Paralympics appearances (overview)
- 1984; 1988; 1992; 1996; 2000; 2004; 2008; 2012; 2016; 2020; 2024

Three male athletes and no female athletes represented Bahrain at the 2000 Summer Paralympics.

== Medallists ==
Medal	Name	Sport	Event
Silver	Ayman Al Heddi	Athletics	Men's discus F51
Bronze	Ahmed Kamal	Athletics	Men's club throw F51

== See also ==
- Bahrain at the 2000 Summer Olympics
- Bahrain at the Paralympics

== Bibliography ==
- International Paralympic Committee (2000). "Appendix C: Athlete Numbers - By Delegation". Sydney 2000 Paralympic Games Post Games Report. Sydney.
