= Milan Kubala =

Czech Paralympic athlete (1946–2020)

Personal information
- Born: 18 June 1946
- Died: 14 March 2020 (aged 73)
Medal record
Paralympic athletics
Representing Czech Republic
Paralympic Games
Gold medal – first place	2000 Sydney	Discus Throw - F36
Gold medal – first place	2004 Athens	Discus Throw - F36
Silver medal – second place	1996 Atlanta	Discus Throw - F35

Milan Kubala (18 June 1946 – 14 March 2020) was a Paralympic athlete from the Czech Republic competing mainly in category F36 shot put and discus events.

Milan competed at three Paralympics, winning a silver in the discus in 1996 and then gold in both 2000 and 2004. He also won gold at the 1998 IPC Athletics World Championships and silver at the 2002 competition.
