= Willem Noorduin =

Dutch Paralympic athlete

Medal record

Track and field (athletics)

Representing Netherlands

Paralympic Games
Gold medal – first place	1992 Barcelona	Discus Throw - C5
Gold medal – first place	1992 Barcelona	Shot Put - C5
Gold medal – first place	1996 Atlanta	Shot Put - F35
Silver medal – second place	1988 Seoul	Discus Throw - C5
Silver medal – second place	2000 Sydney	Discus Throw - F36
Silver medal – second place	2000 Sydney	Shot Put - F36
Silver medal – second place	2004 Athens	Discus Throw - F36
Bronze medal – third place	1996 Atlanta	Discus Throw - F35
Bronze medal – third place	2004 Athens	Shot Put - F36

Willem Noorduin (born 21 March 1967 in Schiedam) is a Paralympian athlete from Netherlands competing mainly in category F36 shot put and discus events.

Noorduin has competed in 6 Paralympics always in shot put and discus events. His first appearance was in Barcelona in 1992 where he won the silver medal in the C5 discus. In 1996 in Atlanta he went much better winning gold in both shot put and discus. The 2000 Summer Paralympics in Sydney saw him defend his gold medal in the shot put in the F35 class but only managing bronze in the discus. 2004 saw him win two silvers, this was followed in 2004 by a silver in the discus and a bronze in the shot put. The 2008 Summer Paralympics in Beijing were the first time Noorduin had been to the Paralympic Games and not won a medal.
