= Mohammad Bin Dabbas =

United Arab Emirati Paralympic athlete

Medal record

Paralympic athletics

Representing United Arab Emirates

Paralympic Games
Bronze medal – third place	2004 Athens	Discus Throw - F33/34

Mohammed Bin Dabbas is a paralympic athlete from United Arab Emirates competing mainly in category F34 throws events.

Mohammed competed in the discus in both the 2000 and 2004 Summer Paralympics, winning the bronze medal in the 2004 games. He also competed in the 2008 Summer Paralympics in Beijing in the discus, shot and javelin but was unable to win a medal.
