= Kieran Ault-Connell =

Australian Paralympic athlete (born 1981)

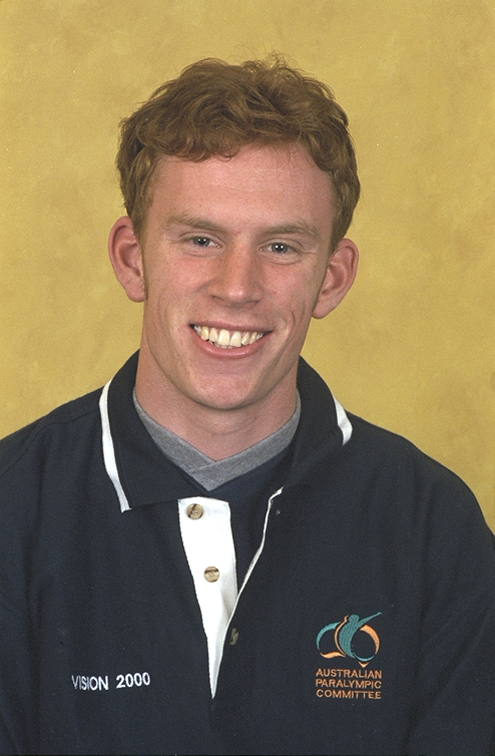
- 2000 Australian Paralympic team portrait of Ault-Connell

Personal information
- Full name: Kieran John Ault-Connell
- Nationality: Australian
- Born: 30 July 1981 (age 45) Melbourne, Victoria

Sport
- Country: Australia
- Sport: Athletics
- Disability: Cerebral palsy
- Disability class: T37, T38
- Events: 100 metres 200 metres Discus throw Javelin throw Long jump
Medal record
Men's para athletics
Representing Australia
Paralympic Games
Gold medal – first place	2000 Sydney	4x100 m relay T38
Gold medal – first place	2000 Sydney	4x400 m relay T38
Silver medal – second place	2004 Athens	Javelin throw F37
World Championships
Bronze medal – third place	1998 Birmingham	Long jump F37
Bronze medal – third place	1998 Birmingham	Javelin throw F37

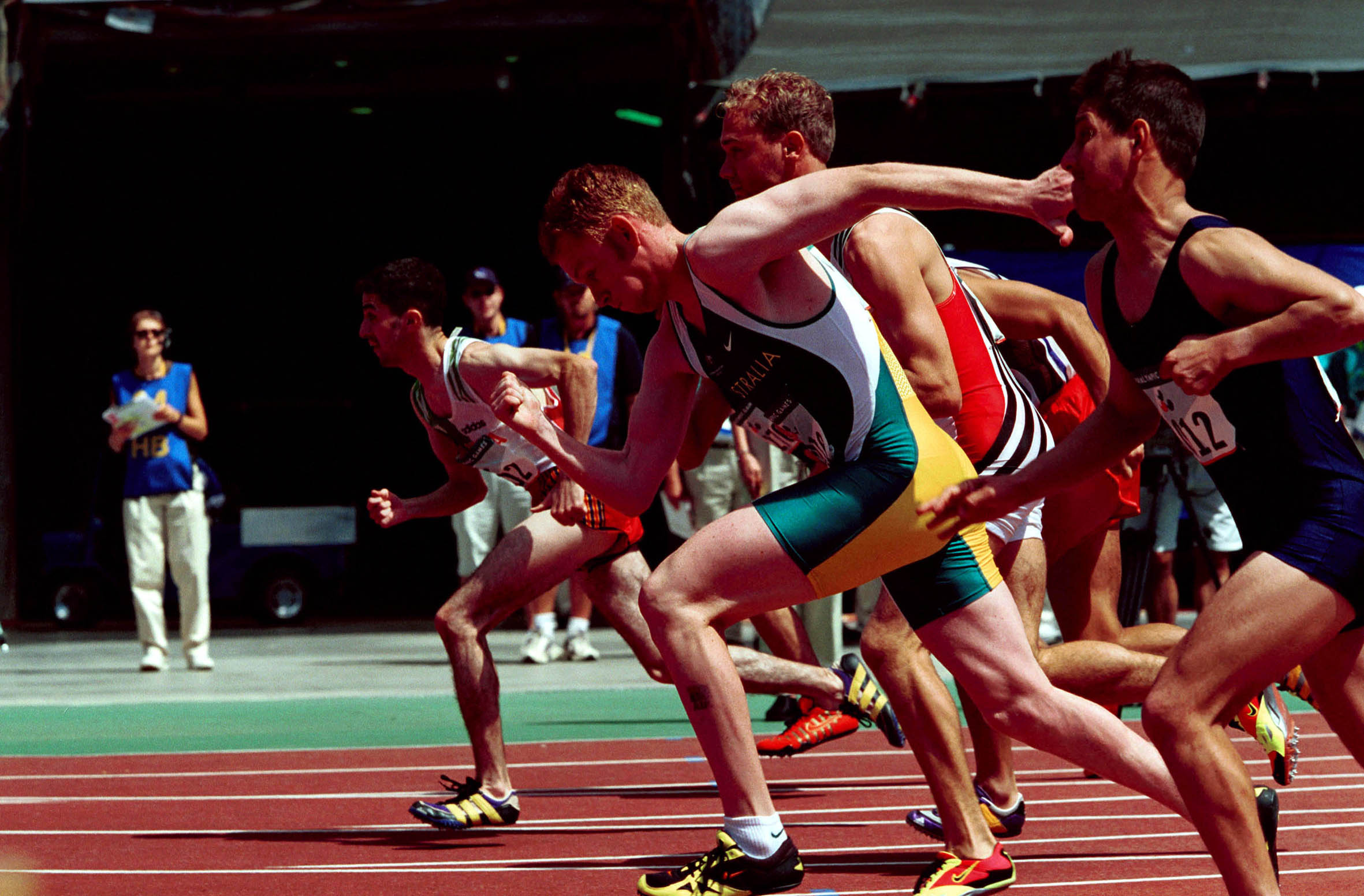
Action shot of Ault-Connell (shown centre, in Australian green and gold) during track competition at the 2000 Summer Paralympics

Kieran John Ault-Connell, OAM (born 30 July 1981) is an Australian Paralympic athlete. He was born in Melbourne, and has cerebral palsy. He took up athletics after watching the 1996 Atlanta Paralympics. At the 1998 IPC Athletics World Championships, he won two bronze medals in javelin and long jump. He won two gold medals at the 2000 Sydney Games in the men's 4x100 m relay T38 and the 4x400 m relay T38 events, for which he received a Medal of the Order of Australia. In the process, he set two world records. At the 2004 Athens Games, he won a silver medal in the Men's Javelin F37 event.

He was previously married to Australian Paralympic athlete Eliza Ault-Connell and they have two daughters and a son.
