= Bahrain at the Paralympics =

- IPC code: BRN
- NPC: Bahrain Disabled Sports Federation
- Medals: Gold 2 Silver 3 Bronze 5 Total 10

Summer appearances
- 1984; 1988; 1992; 1996; 2000; 2004; 2008; 2012; 2016; 2020; 2024

Bahrain made its Paralympic Games début the same year as its Olympic début, at the 1984 Summer Paralympics in Stoke Mandeville and New York City, sending a delegation to compete in athletics. The country has participated in every subsequent edition of the Summer Paralympics, but has never taken part in the Winter Paralympics.

Bahraini competitors have won a total of ten Paralympic medals, all of them in athletics: two gold, three silver and five bronze. The country's first inaugural participation in the Games in 1984 yielded two bronze medals: K. Alqatam finished third in the men's javelin (category 5), and Adel Sultan finished third in the men's 100m sprint (category 5). Bahrain won its first gold medal four years later, with Khaled Al Saqer winning the men's slalom in the 1A category. His compatriot Ali Alhasan took bronze in the same event, while Adel Sultan took a silver medal in the 100m sprint (categories 5–6). In 1992, Al Saqer won the country's only medal, a bronze in the discus (THW2-3). There was no medals in 1996, but in 2000 Ayman Al Heddi and Ahmed Kamal obtained a silver and a bronze, respectively, in the discus and the shot put. Ahmed Meshaima's silver in the shot put (F37) in 2004.

Three women have represented Bahrain at the Paralympics: M. Alkhinna and S. Mohamed in sprinting and slalom, Fatema Nedham was the first woman to win a gold medal for Bahrain in the shot put in 2016. Bahraini women's participation in the Paralympics thus predates their participation in the Olympics, which began in 2004.

== Medal tallies ==
Event	Gold	Silver	Bronze	Total	Ranking
1984 Summer Paralympics	0	0	2	2	43rd
1988 Summer Paralympics	1	1	1	3	37th
1992 Summer Paralympics	0	0	1	1	50th
1996 Summer Paralympics	0	0	0	0	—N/a
2000 Summer Paralympics	0	1	1	2	58th
2004 Summer Paralympics	0	1	0	1	66th
2008 Summer Paralympics	0	0	0	0	—N/a
2012 Summer Paralympics	0	0	0	0	—N/a
2016 Summer Paralympics	1	0	0	0	60th
2020 Summer Paralympics	0	0	0	0	—N/a
2024 Summer Paralympics	0	0	0	0	—N/a

== Medalists ==
Medal	Name	Games	Sport	Event
Bronze	Adel Sultan	(United Kingdom) (United States) 1984 Stoke Mandeville/New York	Athletics	Men's 100m 5
Bronze	K. Alqatam	(United Kingdom) (United States) 1984 Stoke Mandeville/New York	Athletics	Men's javelin throw 5
Gold	Khaled Al Saqer	(South Korea) 1988 Seoul	Athletics	Men's slalom 1A
Silver	Adel Sultan	(South Korea) 1988 Seoul	Athletics	Men's 100m 5-6
Bronze	Ali Alhasan	(South Korea) 1988 Seoul	Athletics	Men's slalom 1A
Bronze	Khaled Al Saqer	(Spain) 1992 Barcelona	Athletics	Men's discus throw THW2-3
Silver	Ayman Al Heddi	(Australia) 2000 Sydney	Athletics	Men's discus throw F51
Bronze	Ahmed Kamal	(Australia) 2000 Sydney	Athletics	Men's club throw F51
Silver	Ahmed Meshaima	(Greece) 2004 Athens	Athletics	Men's shot put F37
Gold	Fatema Nedham	(Brazil) 2016 Rio de Janeiro	Athletics	Women's shot put F53

== See also ==
- Bahrain at the Olympics
