= Dhari Almutairi =

Kuwaiti Paralympic athlete

Medal record

Paralympic athletics

Representing Kuwait

Paralympic Games
Bronze medal – third place	2004 Athens	Shot Put - F32

Dhari Almutairi is a paralympic athlete from Kuwait competing mainly in category F32 shot put events.

Dhari competed in the F32 shot put in the 2004 Summer Paralympics and won a bronze medal.
