= Bahrain at the 1984 Summer Paralympics =

- IPC code: BRN
- NPC: Bahrain Disabled Sports Federation

in Stoke Mandeville/New York
- Competitors: 12
- Medals Ranked 43rd: Gold 0 Silver 0 Bronze 2 Total 2

Summer Paralympics appearances (overview)
- 1984; 1988; 1992; 1996; 2000; 2004; 2008; 2012; 2016; 2020; 2024

Bahrain competed at the 1984 Summer Paralympics in Stoke Mandeville, Great Britain and New York City, United States. 12 competitors from Bahrain won 2 medals, both bronze and finished 43rd and last in the medal table.

== See also ==
- Bahrain at the Paralympics
- Bahrain at the 1984 Summer Olympics
