= 2014 IPC Athletics European Championships – Men's club throw =

The men's club throw at the 2014 IPC Athletics European Championships was held at the Swansea University Stadium from 18–23 August.

== Medalists ==
Event	Gold		Silver		Bronze	
F32	Vladislav Frolov; Russia	34.10	Stephen Miller; Great Britain	30.68	Maciej Sochal; Poland	29.59
F51	Jan Vanek; Czech Republic	23.78	Milos Mitic; Serbia	23.58	—	

== Results ==
=== F32 ===
Rank	Athlete	1	2	3	4	5	6	Best	Notes
1st place, gold medalist(s)	Vladislav Frolov; Russia	32.41	32.41	34.10	32.78	33.49	30.42	34.10	PB
2nd place, silver medalist(s)	Stephen Miller; Great Britain	29.80	29.49	30.68	28.74	30.05	28.85	30.68	
3rd place, bronze medalist(s)	Maciej Sochal; Poland	24.98	27.41	26.91	29.59	X	27.74	29.69	
4	Thomas Green; Great Britain	15.98	25.14	28.43	24.34	27.02	28.04	28.43	
5	Frantisek Serbus; Czech Republic	X	26.74	X	X	X	28.41	28.41	SB
6	Evgenii Demin; Russia	X	26.10	25.07	24.68	25.16	24.84	26.10	PB
7	Georgios Syriis; Greece	X	X	22.37	19.24	X	X	22.37	PB
8	Dimitrios Zisidis; Greece	21.69	21.72	21.84	19.67	22.21	21.73	22.21	
9	Antonino Puglisi; Italy	14.69	X	X	15.28	15.25	15.97	15.97	SB
—	Miloslav Bardiovsky; Slovakia	X	X	X	X	X	X	NM	

=== F51 ===
Rank	Athlete	1	2	3	4	5	6	Best	Notes
1st place, gold medalist(s)	Jan Vanek; Czech Republic	X	23.78	22.52	X	20.68	X	23.78	
2nd place, silver medalist(s)	Milos Mitic; Serbia	23.41	22.82	23.58	23.39	23.02	22.65	23.58	PB
3	Miroslav Matic; Croatia	23.00	23.23	21.52	21.78	22.47	21.88	23.23	

== See also ==
- List of IPC world records in athletics
