= 2015 IPC Athletics World Championships – Men's club throw =

The men's club throw at the 2015 IPC Athletics World Championships was held at the Suheim Bin Hamad Stadium in Doha from 22 to 31 October.

== Medalists ==
Event	Gold		Silver		Bronze	
F32	Vladislav Frolov; Russia	35.94 WR	Lahouari Bahlaz; Algeria	34.46 AR	Maciej Sochal; Poland	32.50 SB
F51	Zeljko Dimitrijevic; Serbia	26.29 CR	Amit Kumar Kumar; India	25.44 AR	Milos Mitic; Serbia	25.40 PB
WR world record | AR area record | CR championship record | GR games record | NR national record | OR Olympic record | PB personal best | SB season best | WL world leading (in a given season)

== See also ==
- List of IPC world records in athletics
