= Bahrain at the 1996 Summer Paralympics =

- IPC code: BRN
- NPC: Bahrain Disabled Sports Federation

in Atlanta
- Competitors: 6
- Medals: Gold 0 Silver 0 Bronze 0 Total 0

Summer Paralympics appearances (overview)
- 1984; 1988; 1992; 1996; 2000; 2004; 2008; 2012; 2016; 2020; 2024

Six male athletes from Bahrain competed at the 1996 Summer Paralympics in Atlanta, United States.

== See also ==
- Bahrain at the Paralympics
- Bahrain at the 1996 Summer Olympics
