= Dave Gale =

British Paralympic athlete

Medal record

Paralympic athletics

Representing United Kingdom

Paralympic Games
Bronze medal – third place	2004 Athens	Discus Throw - F32/51

Dave Gale is a Paralympian athlete from Great Britain competing mainly in category F32/51 discus throw events.

He competed in the 2004 Summer Paralympics in Athens, Greece. There he won a bronze medal in the men's F32/51 discus throw event.
