= Athletics at the 1992 Summer Paralympics – Men's discus throw C5 =

Men's discus throw C5 at the IX Paralympic Games
- Paralympic Athletics
- Venue: Estadi Olímpic de Montjuïc
- Dates: September 1992
- Competitors: 7 from 4 nations

Medalists
1st place, gold medalist(s)		Willem Noorduin	Netherlands
2nd place, silver medalist(s)		Denton Johnson	United States
3rd place, bronze medalist(s)		Thomas Becke	United States

The Men's discus throw B3 was a field event in athletics at the 1992 Summer Paralympics, for visually impaired athletes.

== Results ==
=== Final ===
Place	Athlete	Width
1	Willem Noorduin (NED)	34.26
2	Denton Johnson (USA)	33.98
3	Thomas Becke (USA)	33.66
4	Paul Williams (GBR)	33.12
5	Shane Grenfell (GBR)	27.54
6	Andreas Müller (GER)	25.80
7	Walter Spangler (GER)	DNS
