= Musa Taimazov =

Russian Paralympic athlete (1984–2026)

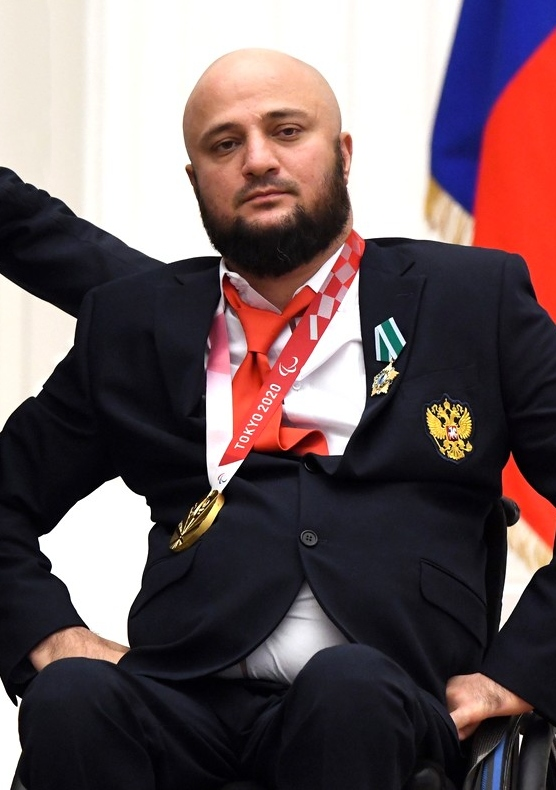
- Taimazov in 2021

Personal information
- Full name: Musa Izamutdinovich Taimazov
- Born: 8 April 1984 Kyakhulay, Dagestan ASSR, Russian SFSR, USSR
- Died: 10 October 2026 (aged 42)

Sport
- Country: Russia
- Sport: Para-athletics
- Disability class: F51
- Event: Club throw
Medal record
Men's para-athletics
Representing RPC
Paralympic Games
Gold medal – first place	2020 Tokyo	Club throw F51
Representing Russia
World Championships
Bronze medal – third place	2019 Dubai	Club throw F51

Musa Izamutdinovich Taimazov (Russian: Муса Изамутдинович Таймазов; 8 April 1984 – 10 October 2026) was a Russian Kumyk Paralympic athlete. He won the gold medal in the men's club throw F51 event at the 2020 Summer Paralympics held in Tokyo, Japan. He also set a new world record of 35.42 metres. He competed at the Summer Paralympics under the flag of the Russian Paralympic Committee.

Taimazov died on 10 October 2026, at the age of 42. He had contracted pyelonephritis, which had resulted in a coma.
