= Mostafa Ahmed =

Egyptian Paralympic athlete

Medal record

Paralympic athletics

Representing Egypt

Paralympic Games
Bronze medal – third place	2004 Athens	Discus Throw - F37

Mostafa Ahmed ali is a paralympic athlete from Egypt competing mainly in category F37 shot put and discus events.

== Athletics ==
=== Paralympics ===
Mostafa competed in the 2004 Summer Paralympics in Athens finishing fifth in the shot put and winning the bronze medal in the F37 discus.
