= František Serbus =

Czech Paralympic athlete (born 1985)

Personal information
- Nationality: Czech
- Born: 20 July 1985 (age 40) Pelhřimov, Czechoslovakia

Sport
- Country: Czech Republic
- Sport: Athletics
- Disability class: F32
Medal record
Men's Athletics
World Championships
| Silver medal – second place | 2011 Christchurch | Discus – F32–34 |
| Bronze medal – third place | 2025 New Delhi | Club throw F32 |
European Championships
| Gold medal – first place | 2012 Stadskanaal | Discus throw F32 |
| Gold medal – first place | 2021 Bydgoszcz | Club throw F32 |
| Silver medal – second place | 2012 Stadskanaal | Club throw F32 |

František Serbus (born 20 July 1985) is a Czech track and field athlete who competes in disability athletics in the F32 category. He specializes in throwing events, particularly club throw, and is also a boccia player. He has also competed in the Summer Paralympics four times.

== Athletics career ==
Serbus had his first major international competition at the 2006 IPC Athletics World Championships in Christchurch. There, he entered three throwing events, including the discus throw, where he finished in fourth place. He then competed at the 2008 Summer Paralympics in the shot put and discus throw, finishing in sixth and seventh.

Serbus competed at the 2011 World Championships, winning the silver medal at the discus throw event.

Serbus competed at the 2012 European Championships, winning the gold medal in the discus throw and the silver medal club throw. He followed this by representing his country at the 2012 Summer Paralympics in London, again competing in the club throw F31/32/52 and discus F32–24, finishing in fifth place in the latter. He also competed in boccia in the Individual BC2 event.

Serbus competed in the 2014 European Championships in the club throw, finishing in fifth place.

At the 2021 European Championships, Serbus won the gold medal in the club throw. He also competed at the delayed 2020 Summer Paralympics, where he finished in sixth place in the club throw.

Serbus competed at the 2025 World Para Athletics Championships and won a bronze medal in the club throw event with a throw of 34.46 metres.
