= Nicholas Larionow =

Australian Paralympic athlete

Medal record

Men's para-athletics

Representing Australia

Paralympic Games
Bronze medal – third place	2004 Athens	Shot Put - F36

Nicholas Larionow (born 28 June 1980) is a paralympic athlete from Australia competing mainly in category F36 discus and shot put events. He was born in Melbourne, Victoria.

Nicholas competed in the 2004 Summer Paralympics in the discus and shot put, finishing third in the shot put.
