= Marián Kuřeja =

Slovak Paralympic athlete

Personal information
- Born: 30 July 1980 (age 45) Banská Bystrica, Czechoslovakia

Sport
- Country: Slovakia
- Sport: Para-athletics
- Disability class: F51
- Events: Club throw; Discus throw
Medal record
Paralympic Games
Bronze medal – third place	2016 Rio de Janeiro	Club throw F51
Bronze medal – third place	2020 Tokyo	Club throw F51

Marián Kuřeja (born 30 July 1980) is a Slovak Paralympic athlete competing in F51-classification club throw and discus throw events. He is a two-time bronze medalist in the men's club throw F51 event at the Summer Paralympics.

He represented Slovakia at the 2016 Summer Paralympics in Rio de Janeiro, Brazil, and he won the bronze medal in the men's club throw F51 event. He qualified to represent Slovakia at the 2020 Summer Paralympics in Tokyo, Japan, after finishing in 4th place in the men's club throw F51 event at the 2019 World Para Athletics Championships held in Dubai, United Arab Emirates. He won the bronze medal in the men's club throw F51 event.

At the 2017 World Para Athletics Dubai Grand Prix, he won the silver medal in the men's discus throw F51/52 event.

At the 2018 World Para Athletics European Championships held in Berlin, Germany, he won the silver medal in the men's club throw F51 event.

In 2023, he competed in the men's club throw F51 event at the World Para Athletics Championships held in Paris, France. He finished in 4th place.
