= Thierry Cibone =

French Paralympic athlete

Personal information
- Born: 8 August 1973 (age 53) Lifou, New Caledonia

Sport
- Sport: Para-athletics
- Disability class: F34
- Events: Discus throw, Javelin throw, Shot put
Medal record
Paralympic athletics
Representing France
Paralympic Games
Gold medal – first place	2000 Sydney	Discus Throw - F35
Gold medal – first place	2000 Sydney	Javelin Throw - F35
Gold medal – first place	2000 Sydney	Shot Put - F35
Bronze medal – third place	2004 Athens	Javelin Throw - F35
Bronze medal – third place	2004 Athens	Shot Put - F35
Bronze medal – third place	2012 London	Shot Put - F34

Thierry Cibone (born 8 August 1973) is a Paralympic athlete competing in throwing events. He lives in New Caledonia and represents France in international competition. He has cerebral palsy.

Cibone has competed in 5 Paralympic Games.

Initially, he threw standing as an F35 athlete. At the 2000 Summer Paralympics in Sydney, he won 3 gold medals, in discus, javelin and shot put. At the 2004 Summer Paralympics in Athens, he won bronze medals in shot put and javelin. He also competed at the 2008 Summer Paralympics but did not medal.

Cibone then commenced throwing seated, as an F34 athlete. At the 2011 IPC Athletics World Championships, he won gold in the F34 shot put and javelin. At the 2012 Summer Paralympics, he won bronze in the F34 shot put. He competed but did not medal at the 2020 Summer Paralympics.

== Bibliography ==
- Thierry Cibone at the International Paralympic Committee
- Thierry Cibone at IPC.InfostradaSports.com (archived)
