= Siamak Saleh-Farajzadeh =

Iranian Paralympic athlete

Personal information
- Born: 26 December 1977 (age 48) Tehran, Iran

Sport
- Sport: Paralympic athletics
Medal record
Paralympic athletics
Representing Iran
Paralympic Games
Gold medal – first place	2004 Athens	Discus throw F33-34
IPC World Championships
Gold medal – first place	2015 Doha	Shot put F34
Silver medal – second place	2017 London	Discus throw F34
Asian Para Games
Silver medal – second place	2018 Jakarta	Shot put F34

Siamek Saleh-Farajzadeh (born 26 December 1977) is a paralympic athlete from Iran competing mainly in category F33 shot and discus events.

Siamek competed in the 2004 Summer Paralympics shot put and won the gold medal in the F33-34 discus. Siamek was also due to take part in the discus in 2008 but did not start.
