= Yan Feng (athlete) =

Chinese Paralympic athlete

Medal record

Men's para-athletics

Representing China

Paralympic Games
Gold medal – first place	2004 Athens	Discus throw F35

Yan Feng is a paralympic athlete from China competing mainly in category F35 throwing events.

He competed in the 2004 Summer Paralympics in all three F35 throwing events winning a gold in the discus.
