= Sport in Bahrain =

A variety of sports in Bahrain are popular with widespread following. Association football is the most popular sport in the country. Other traditionally popular sports include basketball, volleyball and handball. Sports such as horse racing, mixed martial arts, cricket and rugby union have gained popularity over the past few decades.

== Football ==
Bahrain has its own top-tier domestic professional football league, the Bahraini Premier League. It features 10 football clubs that play a two-round robin set, with each team playing a total of 18 fixtures. The winners of the domestic championship qualify for the AFC Cup.

The league uses a promotion and relegation system with the Bahraini Classification League, Bahrain's second-tier football league. The season usually starts in September and concludes in May, as in other football leagues. The first season was held in 1952. Although games are played on a home and away basis, almost all games are played at the Bahrain National Stadium.

The bottom placed club is relegated with the team finishing second bottom entering a relegation/promotion playoff match. The most successful club in the league's history is Al-Muharraq SC. The current reigning champion of the 2011-2012 football season is Riffa club.

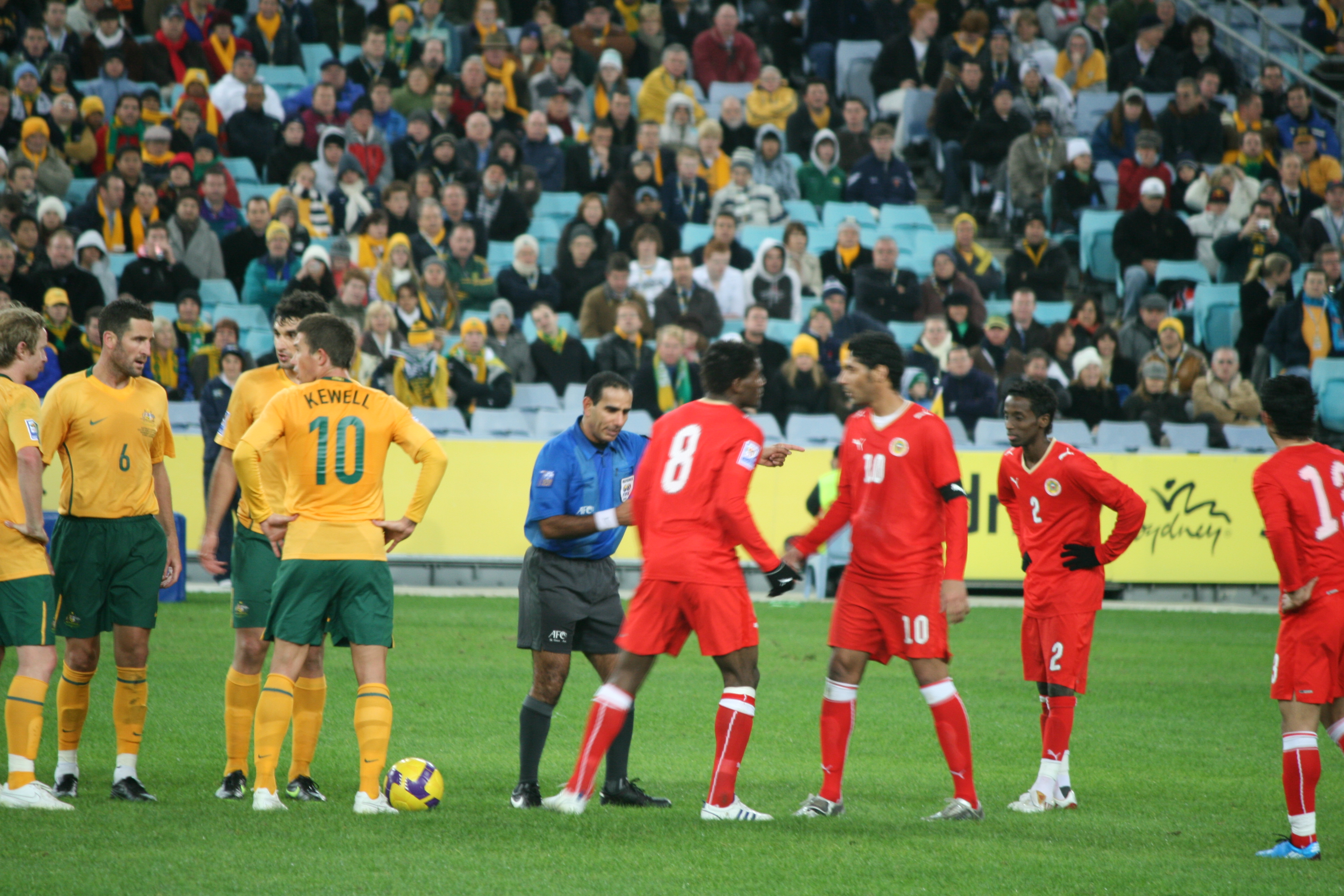
The Bahrain national football team playing Australia on June 10, 2009, in a World Cup qualifier

| Club | Number of Championships |
|---|---|
| Muharraq Club | 32 |
| Bahrain Riffa Club (includes West Riffa) | 10 |
| Bahrain Club | 5 |
| Al-Ahli | 5 |
| Arabi Club | 1 |
| Al Hala | 1 |
| Al-Nasr | 1 |
| East Riffa Club | 1 |

== F1 and Motorsports ==
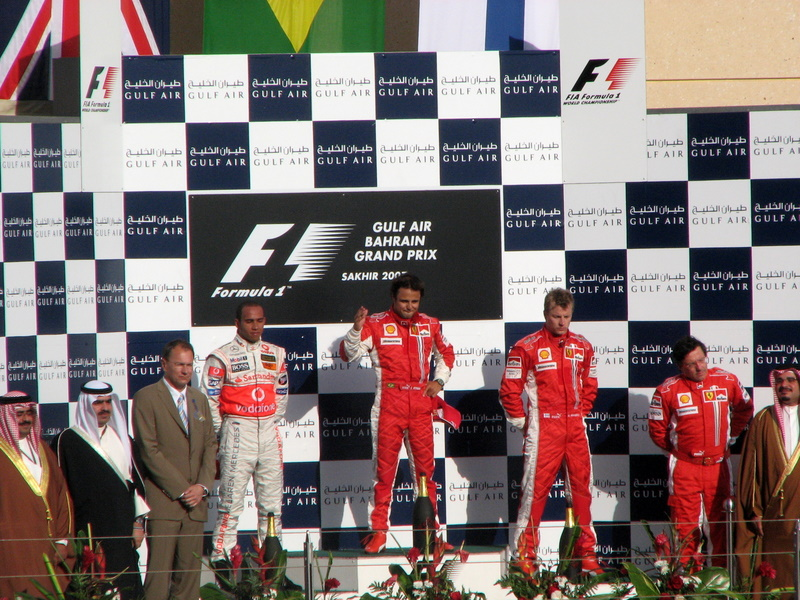
The podium ceremony of the 2007 Bahrain Grand Prix.

Motorsport is one of the most popular sports in Bahrain. Bahrain has a Formula One race-track, the Bahrain International Circuit, which hosted the inaugural Gulf Air Bahrain Grand Prix on 4 April 2004, the first in an Arab country. The race was won by Scuderia Ferrari driver Michael Schumacher. After hosting the third round of the championship in 2005, Bahrain hosted the opening Grand Prix of the 2006 season on 12 March of that year. Both the 2005 and 2006 races were won by Fernando Alonso of Renault. The 2007 event took place on 13, 14 April and 15.

The 2011 edition of the race was cancelled due to civil unrest. However, the 2012 Bahrain Grand Prix went ahead despite concerns of the safety of the teams and the ongoing protests in the country. Sebastian Vettel won the race. The race's opponents described the decision to hold the race despite ongoing protests and violence as one of the most controversial Grand Prix in the sport's history.

In 2014, the event was held under lights for the first time, making it the second full night race on the F1 calendar after the Singapore Grand Prix (the Abu Dhabi Grand Prix is a day-night race).

The circuit also hosts the annual 8 Hours of Bahrain as part of the FIA World Endurance Championship.

In 2006, Bahrain also hosted its inaugural Australian V8 Supercar event dubbed the "Desert 400". The circuit also features a full-length drag strip where the Bahrain Drag Racing Club has organised invitational events featuring some of Europe's top drag racing teams to try to raise the profile of the sport in the Middle East.

== Mixed Martial Arts ==
=== Brave Combat Federation ===
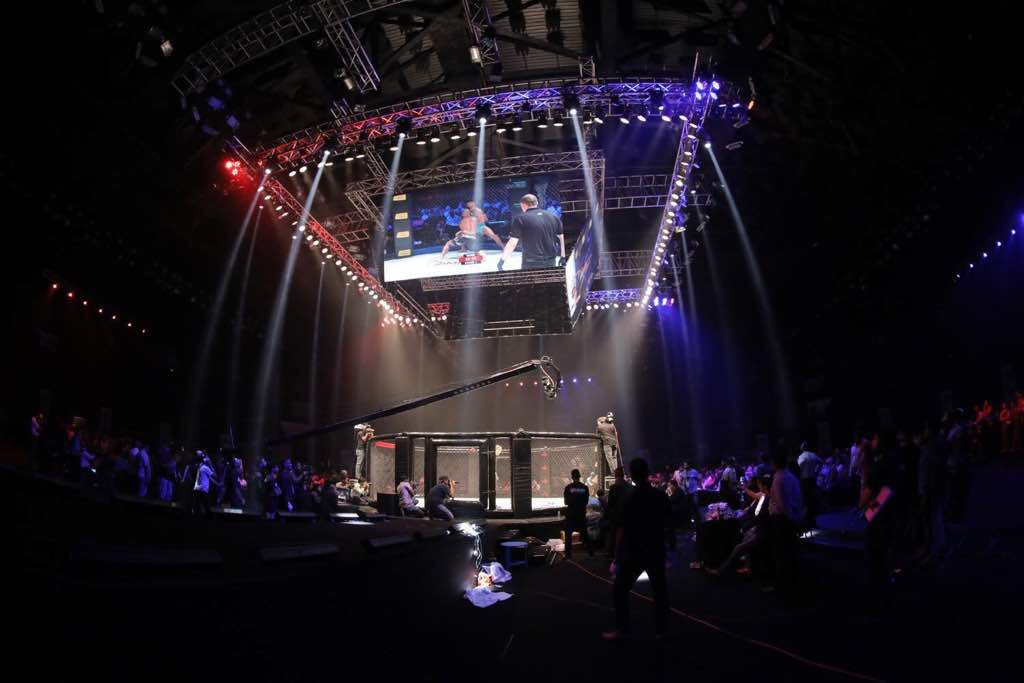
Mixed Martial Arts event in Bahrain

Mixed martial arts is legalized in Bahrain. The development of MMA in the nation is convened through KHK MMA, which owns Brave Combat Federation which is the largest Mixed Martial Arts promotion in the Middle East and the organization that has hosted events in the most number of nations globally. BRAVE Combat Federation was established on 23 September 2016 by Sheikh Khalid bin Hamad Al Khalifa. The organization based in Bahrain has showcased 82 events to date, in 31 different countries around the world, including five of its shows taking place in the Kingdom itself.

Bahrain MMA Federation (BMMAF) has been set up under the patronage of Sheikh Khalid bin Hamad Al Khalifa. Bahrain hosted Amateur World Championships in 2017, 2018, and 2019 in association with International Mixed Martial Arts Federation. Bahrain is the first Asian and Arab country to host the amateur MMA championship.

=== KHK MMA Fight Team ===
KHK MMA Fight Team featured fighters from multiple promotions including Khabib Nurmagomedov, Frankie Edgar, Jose Torres, Muhammad Mokaev, Hamza Kooheji, Shamil Gaziev and James Gallagher. Apart from professional MMA, athletes from KHK MMA also competes in International Mixed Martial Arts Federation championships representing the Kingdom of Bahrain, ranking first in the Senior National Team Rankings.

== Equestrianism ==
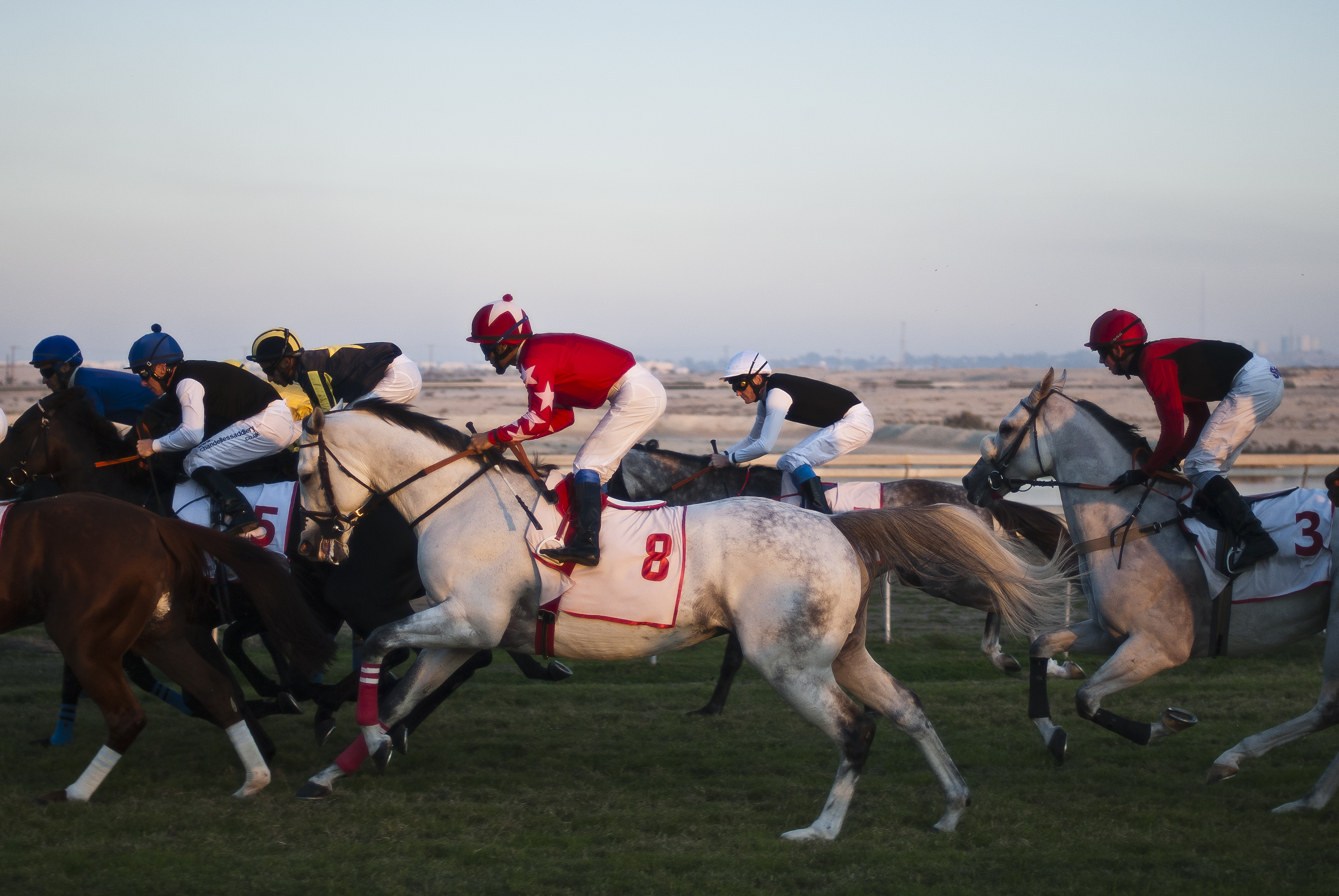
Horse racing in the Sakhir track

Equestrian sports are one of the most popular sports in the country. Horse riding is governed by the Bahrain Royal Equestrian and Endurance Federation (BREEF) which was founded in 2003, having replaced the previous governing body, the Bahrain Equestrian Association. The BREEF is headquartered in the town of Awali, south of the capital Manama. The first ever Endurance racing started on 7 October 2004 with the grand event, of a distance of 120 km, being held on 7 December that year. In 2005, the 'World Championship for Juniors and Young Riders' race was held in Bahrain, attracting international riders and attention.

Bahrain has been a member of the International Equestrian Federation since 1985, a member of the Asian Equestrian Association since 1989 and a member of the Pan-Arab Equestrian Federation since 1990.

The kingdom is home to multiple training stables.

=== Show jumping ===
The official sport of show jumping has its origins in Bahrain dating back to 1976. The sport was first played by the modern pentathlon team of the Bahrain Defense Force. In the year 1986, the Safria Team was established for representing the Kingdom of Bahrain in both the military and civil show jumping championships abroad.

== Basketball ==
Bahrain has a professional basketball league, featuring 11 club teams. The top four teams of the league, at the end of the season, move on to the 'Golden Square', where the top seeds play the fourth seeds and the second take on the third in separate best-of-three series. The best-of-five championship series follows.

In addition to the league, a basketball cup, the Zain Bahrain Basketball Cup, is available where the top two teams at the end will then battle for the Cup in a[best-of-three finale. The winner of the cup will represent Bahrain in the Asian Clubs Basketball Championships.

Both the league and cup is sponsored by Zain.

The overall league champions will be given the chance of representing Bahrain in the Arab Club Basketball Championship, held in the following year.

== Cricket ==
Official Poster of the Bahrain Premier League 2018

Professional Cricket is governed by the Bahrain Cricket Association. The sport is largely popular amongst South Asian expatriates in the country. Bahrain has a national cricket team whose first international appearance was at the ACC Trophy in 2004, where they failed to progress beyond the first round. They took part in the tournament again in August 2006, putting in a much better performance to finish in 6th place. Earlier in the year they won the ACC Middle East Cup, beating Afghanistan in the final.

In 2018, franchise based T20 cricket was introduced for the first time in Bahrain. Six teams were featured in the first edition of the event. The teams were SRam MRam Falcons, Kalaam Knight-Riders, Intex Lions, Bahrain Super Giants, Four Square Challengers and Awan Warriors.

Bahrain's debut in the ICC World Cricket League was in 2009 when they won the 2009 Global Division Seven tournament and hence advancing to Division Six. They had another strong tournament in Division Six, coming runners up and gaining back to back promotions in the process. In 2010 they competed in Division Five in Nepal. In November 2009 Bahrain played in the 2009 ACC Twenty20 Cup. They finished bottom of Group B, losing all five of their matches on the process. In the eleventh placed playoff Bahrain defeated China by 93 runs to finish the tournament in eleventh place.

The country also has its own cricket league, with 48 teams and over 750 cricketers playing in the Bahrain Cricket League. The league was founded in 1981 under the name "Junior Cricket League" and initially had 4 teams. By 2010, this had risen to 46.

== Rugby union ==
Rugby sevens and full rugby union are played in Bahrain, with the Bahrainis having their own national sevens team. Bahrain's Rugby Football Club was first founded in 1970, as a branch of the local British Club. It has its own rugby league. Bahrain also has its own national sevens rugby team.

== Olympics ==
At the 2012 Olympic Games in London, England, runner Maryam Yusuf Jamal became Bahrain's first Olympic medalist when she won a bronze in the women's 1,500m race. Jamal is the first female athlete from a Persian Gulf nation to win an Olympic medal. Bahrain hosts a variety of Olympic-level sports centers.
