= Fabian Michaels =

South African paralympic athlete

Medal record

Paralympic athletics

Representing South Africa

Paralympic Games
Silver medal – second place	2004 Athens	Javelin Throw - F35

Fabian Michaels is a paralympic athlete from South Africa competing mainly in category T35 throwing events.

Fabian Michaels competed in all three throws at the 2004 Summer Paralympics and even showed his versatility by running a leg of the South African 4 × 100 m relay team, but it was in the javelin that he won a silver medal.
