= Bahrain at the 2004 Summer Paralympics =

- IPC code: BRN
- NPC: Bahrain Disabled Sports Federation

in Athens
- Competitors: 5 in 1 sport
- Flag bearer: Ahmed Meshaima
- Medals Ranked 66th: Gold 0 Silver 1 Bronze 0 Total 1

Summer Paralympics appearances (overview)
- 1984; 1988; 1992; 1996; 2000; 2004; 2008; 2012; 2016; 2020; 2024

Bahrain competed at the 2004 Summer Paralympics in Athens, Greece. The team included five athletes, all of whom were men. Ahmed Meshaima won the nation's only medal at the Games, a silver in the men's shot put F37.

== Medallists ==
Medal	Name	Sport	Event
Silver	Ahmed Meshaima	Athletics	Men's shot put F37

== Sports ==
=== Athletics ===
==== Men's field ====
Athlete	Class	Event	Final		
Athlete	Class	Event	Result	Points	Rank
Ayman Al Heddi	F32/51	Club throw	26.85	907	5
Ayman Al Heddi	F32/51	Discus	15.86	866	7
Ahmed Kamal	F32	Shot put	5.70	-	8
Ahmed Kamal	F32/51	Club throw	27.65	934	4
Ahmed Kamal	F32/51	Discus	16.29 PR	890	6
Ahmed Meshaima	F37	Discus	37.12	-	6
Ahmed Meshaima	F37	Javelin	41.47	-	5
Ahmed Meshaima	F37	Shot put	13.28	-	2nd place, silver medalist(s)

=== Powerlifting ===
==== Men ====
Athlete	Event	Result	Rank
Husain Ali Mahdi	+100kg	155.0	11
Sadeq Neama	100kg	140.0	14

== See also ==
- Bahrain at the Paralympics
- Bahrain at the 2004 Summer Olympics
