= Robert Chyra =

Polish Paralympic athlete (born 1974)

Medal record

Paralympic athletics

Representing Poland

Paralympic Games
Gold medal – first place	2000 Sydney	Discus Throw - F37
Bronze medal – third place	2004 Athens	Shot Put - F37

Robert Chyra (born 1974) is a paralympic athlete from Poland competing mainly in category F37 throwing events.

Robert competed in all three throws in the 2000 Summer Paralympics winning gold in the discus throw. In 2004 he was unable to defend his title in the discus but did win a bronze medal in the shot put. At the 2008 Summer Paralympics he again competed in the shot and discus but could only manage fourth and ninth respectively.
