= Fatema Nedham =

Bahraini Paralympic athlete

Sport
- Country: Bahrain
- Sport: Paralympic athletics
- Disability: Born without legs and three fingers are missing on each hand
- Disability class: F53
- Events: Discus throw; Javelin throw; Shot put
Medal record
Paralympic Games
| Gold medal – first place | 2016 Rio de Janeiro | Shot put F53 |
World Championships
| Gold medal – first place | 2017 London | Shot put F53 |
Asian Para Games
| Silver medal – second place | 2018 Jakarta | Discus throw F51/52/53 |

Fatema Nedham is a Paralympic athlete from Bahrain. She is the first female Paralympic athlete to win a medal at the Summer Paralympics for Bahrain. She represented the country at the 2016 Summer Paralympics in Rio de Janeiro, Brazil and she won the gold medal in the women's shot put F53 event with a throw of 4.76 metres. She was also the flag bearer for her country during the opening ceremony of the 2016 Summer Paralympics.

She also represented Bahrain at the 2008 Summer Paralympics in the women's discus throw F32–34/51–53 event without winning a medal. She also competed at the 2012 Summer Paralympics in the women's discus throw F51/52/53 and women's javelin throw F33/34/52/53 events, also without winning a medal.

At the 2017 World Para Athletics Championships held in London, United Kingdom, she won the gold medal in the women's shot put F53.
