= Željko Dimitrijević =

Serbian Paralympic athlete (born 1971)

Željko Dimitrijevic
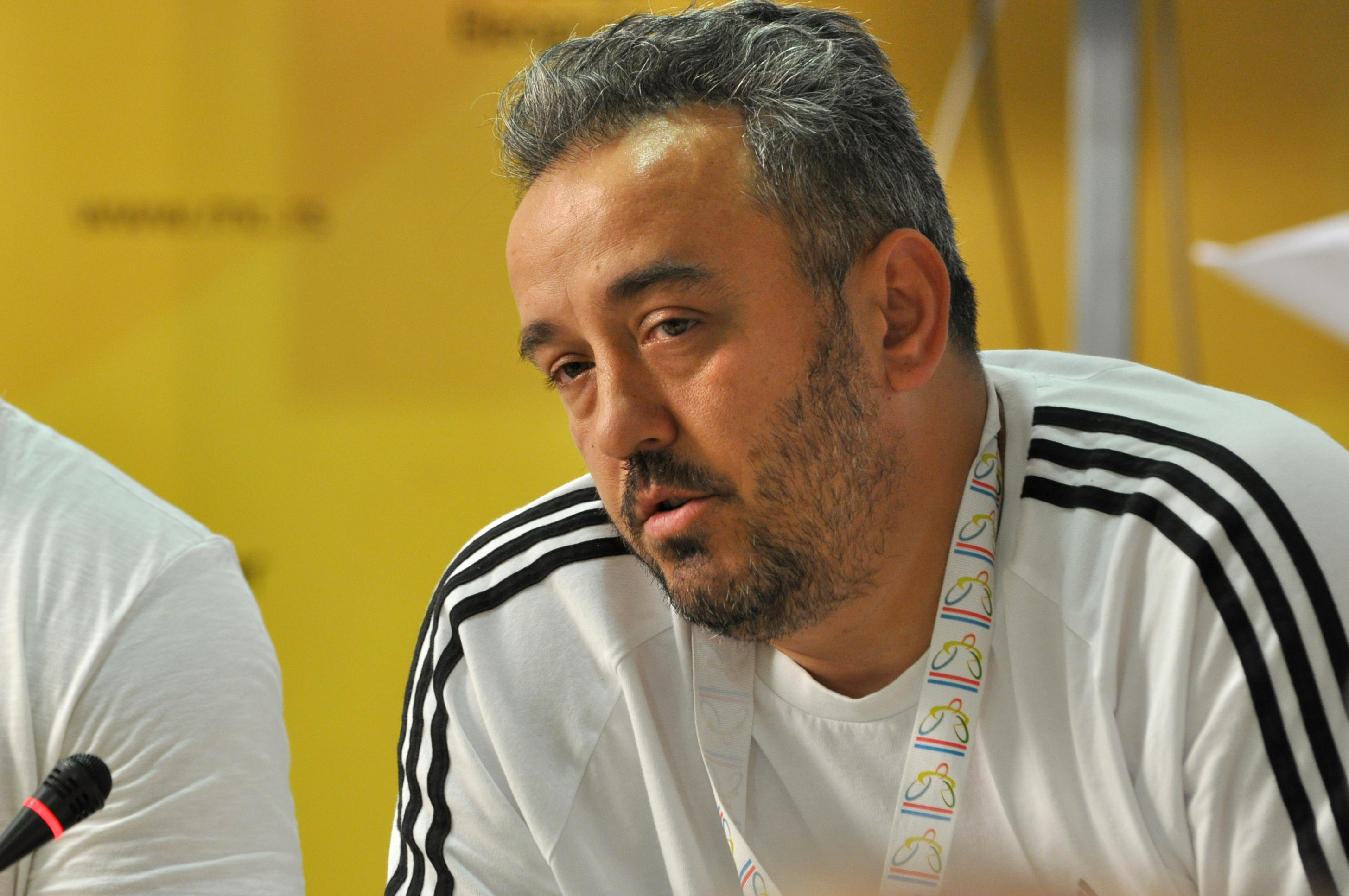

Personal information
- Nationality: Serbian
- Born: Жељко Димитријевић; 4 January 1971 (age 55) Petrovac na Mlavi, SR Serbia, SFR Yugoslavia

Sport
- Sport: Athletics
- Event: Club throw

Achievements and titles
- Personal best: 35.29
Medal record
Representing Serbia
Men's Athletics
Paralympic Games
Gold medal – first place	2012 London	Club throw F31-32/51
Gold medal – first place	2016 Rio de Janeiro	Club throw F51
Silver medal – second place	2020 Tokyo	Club throw F51
Bronze medal – third place	2024 Paris	Club throw F51
World Championships
Gold medal – first place	2015 Doha	Club throw F51
Gold medal – first place	2017 London	Club throw F51
Gold medal – first place	2024 Kobe	Club throw F51
European Championships
Gold medal – first place	2016 Grosseto	Club throw F51
Gold medal – first place	2018 Berlin	Club throw F51
Gold medal – first place	2021 Bydgoszcz	Club throw F51

Željko Dimitrijević (Serbian Cyrillic: Жељко Димитријевић; born 4 January 1971) is a gold medal-winning Paralympian athlete from Serbia. He competes in seated throws in the F51 classification, a class for quadriplegics. He is the current world record holder in club throw.

== Career ==
At the 2012 Summer Paralympics held in London, he won a gold medal in club throw, broke a world record and became Serbia's first Paralympic gold medalist. At the 2016 Summer Paralympics, Dimitrijević won another gold medal in the same event with a new world record (29.96 m).

At the 2021 World Para Athletics European Championships, Dimitrijević won a gold medal in club throw in the F51 classification with a new world record of 34.71 m.
