= Thomas Loosch =

German Paralympic athlete

Personal information
- Nationality: German
- Born: 28 April 1963 (age 63)

Sport
- Country: Germany
- Sport: Paralympic athletics
- Disability class: F38
- Event: Throwing events
Medal record
Event	1st	2nd	3rd
Paralympic Games	0	1	2
World Championships	0	0	0
European Championships	0	1	0
Paralympic athletics
Representing Germany
Paralympic Games
Silver medal – second place	2004 Athens	Shot Put - F38
Bronze medal – third place	2004 Athens	Discus Throw - F38
Bronze medal – third place	2008 Beijing	Shot Put - F37/38
IPC European Championships
Silver medal – second place	2012 Stadskanaal	Shot put - F38

Thomas Loosch (born 28 April 1963) is a Paralympian athlete from Germany competing mainly in category F38 throwing events.

Loosch has competed in two Paralympic Games and won medals in both. In the 2004 Summer Paralympics in Athens, he won a silver medal in the F38 shot put and a bronze medal in the F38 discus throw as well as competing in the F36/38 javelin. In the 2008 Summer Paralympics in Beijing, he competed in the F37/38 discus and won a bronze medal in the F37/38 shot put.
