= Maciej Sochal =

Polish Paralympic athlete (born 1987)

Personal information
- Born: 29 August 1987 (age 38)

Sport
- Country: Poland
- Sport: Para-athletics
- Disability class: F32
- Events: Club throw; Shot put
Medal record
Paralympic Games
Gold medal – first place	2016 Rio de Janeiro	Club throw F32
World Championships
Silver medal – second place	2013 Lyon	Club throw F32
Bronze medal – third place	2015 Doha	Club throw F32
Bronze medal – third place	2019 Dubai	Club throw F32
European Championships
Bronze medal – third place	2012 Stadskanaal	Shot put F32
Bronze medal – third place	2014 Swansea	Shot put F32
Bronze medal – third place	2014 Swansea	Club throw F32
Silver medal – second place	2016 Grosseto	Shot put F32
Gold medal – first place	2016 Grosseto	Club throw F32
Gold medal – first place	2018 Berlin	Shot put F32
Gold medal – first place	2018 Berlin	Club throw F32

Maciej Sochal (born 29 August 1987) is a Polish Paralympic athlete competing in club throw and shot put events. He represented Poland at the Summer Paralympics in 2004, 2012, 2016 and 2021. He won the gold medal in the men's club throw F32 event at the 2016 Summer Paralympics.

He qualified to represent Poland at the 2020 Summer Paralympics in Tokyo, Japan after winning the bronze medal in the men's club throw F32 event at the 2019 World Para Athletics Championships held in Dubai, United Arab Emirates.
