= Ahmed Meshaima =

Bahraini Paralympic athlete

Personal information
- Born: 11 October 1983 (age 42)

Sport
- Sport: Paralympic athletics
Medal record
Men's Paralympic athletics
Representing Bahrain
Paralympic Games
Silver medal – second place	2004 Athens	Shot put F37
Asian Para Games
Gold medal – first place	2010 Guangzhou	Shot put F37–38
Bronze medal – third place	2014 Incheon	Shot put F37

Ahmed Meshaima (born 11 October 1983) is a paralympic track and field athlete from Bahrain competing mainly in category F37 throwing events.

In the 2004 Summer Paralympics, Ahmed competed in all three T37 class throws, winning a silver medal in the shot put. He followed this in Beijing in the 2008 Summer Paralympics by competing in the shot put and javelin, but failed to match his 2004 achievement and went home without any medals.
