= 2019 World Para Athletics Championships – Women's club throw =

The women's club throw at the 2019 World Para Athletics Championships was held in Dubai on 8 November (F32) and 11 November (F51).

== Medalists ==
Event	Gold		Silver		Bronze	
F32	Maroua Ibrahmi; Tunisia	24.45	Mounia Gasmi; Algeria	23.45	Anastasiia Moskalenko; Ukraine	21.58 PB
F51	Zoia Ovsii; Ukraine	25.23 WR	Joanna Butterfield; United Kingdom	21.67	Elena Gorlova; Russia	20.34
WR world record | AR area record | CR championship record | GR games record | NR national record | OR Olympic record | PB personal best | SB season best | WL world leading (in a given season)

== Detailed results ==
=== F32 ===
The event was held on 8 November.

Rank	Athlete	1	2	3	4	5	6	Best	Notes
1st place, gold medalist(s)	Maroua Ibrahmi; Tunisia	21.58	22.77	24.45	20.52	21.79	22.94	24.45	
2nd place, silver medalist(s)	Mounia Gasmi; Algeria	x	20.27	21.17	23.45	x	21.78	23.45	
3rd place, bronze medalist(s)	Anastasiia Moskalenko; Ukraine	20.98	21.41	21.58	21.45	20.87	20.66	21.58	PB
4	Noura Alktebi; United Arab Emirates	17.67	17.07	17.02	18.30	17.61	13.98	18.30	
5	Hind Frioua; Morocco	16.95	17.92	15.13	16.26	17.48	15.37	17.92	WR
6	Anna Muzikova; Russia	16.59	17.33	17.11	16.17	16.13	16.45	17.33	PB
7	Hanna Wichmann; Germany	15.44	12.74	14.08	14.95	14.70	16.09	16.09	
8	Thekra Alkaabi; United Arab Emirates	x	x	13.00	15.47	14.73	13.03	15.47	SB
9	Baiba Rorbaha; Latvia	12.61	x	x	x	12.60	14.12	14.12	PB
10	Krisztina Kalman; Hungary	12.76	12.28	9.55	13.72	x	12.36	13.72	

=== F51 ===
The event was held on 11 November.

Rank	Athlete	1	2	3	4	5	6	Best	Notes
1st place, gold medalist(s)	Zoia Ovsii; Ukraine	25.23	23.35	25.16	23.37	20.02	21.03	25.23	WR
2nd place, silver medalist(s)	Joanna Butterfield; United Kingdom	21.67	21.62	21.61	20.52	x	21.37	21.67	
3rd place, bronze medalist(s)	Elena Gorlova; Russia	20.34	19.94	19.54	19.53	19.78	19.58	20.34	
4	Ekta Bhyan; India	14.42	16.04	10.50	x	x	9.82	16.04	SB
5	Kashish Lakra; India	x	3.56	x	x	3.68	x	3.68	

== See also ==
- List of IPC world records in athletics
