= 2025 World Para Athletics Championships – Women's club throw =

The women's club throw events at the 2025 World Para Athletics Championships were held at the Jawaharlal Nehru Stadium, Delhi in New Delhi.

== Medalists ==
Event	Gold	Silver	Bronze
F32	Róża Kozakowska; Poland	Maroua Brahmi; Tunisia	Giovanna Boscolo; Brazil
F51	Zoia Ovsii; Ukraine	Ekta Bhyan; India	Ekaterina Potapova; Neutral Paralympic Athletes

== F32 ==
Final

The event took place on 30 September.

Rank	Name	Nationality	#1	#2	#3	#4	#5	#6	Result	Notes
1st place, gold medalist(s)	Róża Kozakowska	Poland	28.52	29.30	26.89	28.21	19.28	26.40	29.30	CR
2nd place, silver medalist(s)	Maroua Brahmi	Tunisia	23.85	28.00	28.13	29.19	26.95	28.23	29.19	
3rd place, bronze medalist(s)	Giovanna Boscolo	Brazil	25.33	16.33	26.40	17.06	21.19	27.09	27.09	
4	Anastasiia Moskalenko	Ukraine	24.89	23.77	22.46	22.29	23.51	25.83	25.83	PB
5	Parastoo Habibi	Iran	20.34	23.83	22.11	22.17	21.53	22.39	23.83	SB
6	Makhliyo Akramova	Uzbekistan	19.29	20.41	21.93	23.14	23.82	21.97	23.82	PB
7	Lea Majernikova	Slovakia	20.56	19.52	20.63	22.02	18.04	19.91	22.02	
8	Wanna Brito	Brazil	x	21.84	21.53	21.02	18.03	21.48	21.84	
9	Noura Alktebi	United Arab Emirates	17.87	18.82	19.78	20.18	20.26	20.47	20.47	
10	Mounia Gasmi	Algeria	x	x	19.09	19.58	19.87	18.27	19.87	

Qualification

The event took place on 29 September. Qualification: The 4 best performers (q) advance to the Final

Rank	Name	Nationality	Сlass	#1	#2	#3	Result	Notes
1	Makhliyo Akramova	Uzbekistan	F32	21.41	23.39	23.77	23.77	q, PB
2	Mounia Gasmi	Algeria	F32	x	22.34	21.76	22.34	q
3	Noura Alktebi	United Arab Emirates	F32	19.50	21.10	21.07	21.10	q, SB
4	Lea Majernikova	Slovakia	F32	19.84	13.17	17.60	19.84	q
5	Evgeniia Galaktionova	Neutral Paralympic Athletes	F32	18.74	18.32	19.05	19.05	
6	Thekra Alkaabi	United Arab Emirates	F32	18.52	18.01	18.87	18.87	
7	Nargiza Safarova	Neutral Paralympic Athletes	F32	10.86	x	14.38	14.38	
8	Anandhi Kulanthaisamy	India	F31	13.03	x	x	13.03	

== F51 ==
Final

The event took place on 4 October.

Rank	Name	Nationality	#1	#2	#3	#4	#5	#6	Result	Notes
1st place, gold medalist(s)	Zoia Ovsii	Ukraine	23.25	23.30	23.57	22.87	24.03	23.80	24.03	SB
2nd place, silver medalist(s)	Ekta Bhyan	India	16.52	18.14	17.22	19.60	17.09	19.80	19.80	SB
3rd place, bronze medalist(s)	Ekaterina Potapova	Neutral Paralympic Athletes	18.35	18.21	18.60	x	17.51	17.53	18.60	SB
4	Farzaneh Sohrabitabar	Iran	18.57	18.44	18.27	18.16	17.90	18.24	18.57	
5	Nadjet Boucherf	Algeria	14.10	13.87	14.02	x	14.15	x	14.15	AF
6	Kashish Lakra	India	11.17	x	x	11.64	x	10.42	11.64	SB
