= 2023 World Para Athletics Championships – Women's club throw =

The women's club throw events at the 2023 World Para Athletics Championships were held at Charlety Stadium, Paris, France, on 9 and 16 July.

== Medalists ==
Event	Gold	Silver	Bronze
F32	Róża Kozakowska; Poland	Maroua Brahmi; Tunisia	Oumaima Oubraym; Morocco
F51	Zoia Ovsii; Ukraine	Cassie Mitchell; United States	Ekta Bhyan; India

== Results ==
=== F32 ===
The event took place on 9 July.

Rank	Athlete	1	2	3	4	5	6	Best	Notes
1st place, gold medalist(s)	Róża Kozakowska; Poland	18.59	24.65	22.86	24.53	27.29	25.85	27.29	CR
2nd place, silver medalist(s)	Maroua Brahmi; Tunisia	25.32	25.13	26.32	25.26	27.01	27.00	27.01	SB
3rd place, bronze medalist(s)	Oumaima Oubraym; Morocco	19.28	22.07	20.72	16.08	22.49	25.26	25.26	PB
4	Anastasiia Moskalenko; Ukraine	x	18.85	23.62	22.58	23.95	23.33	23.95	SB
5	Wanna Brito; Brazil	16.79	21.29	20.89	21.91	23.65	22.52	23.65	
6	Thekra Alkaabi; United Arab Emirates	20.49	18.73	21.59	20.96	19.70	22.14	22.14	AR
7	Marilu Romina Fernandez; Argentina	18.49	19.73	21.76	17.99	21.35	20.18	21.76	PB
8	Noura Alktebi; United Arab Emirates	17.32	20.31	19.46	19.56	12.77	20.89	20.89	SB
9	Hind Frioua; Morocco	3.55	13.75	17.66	17.50	20.44	20.58	20.58	CR
10	Anna Muzikova; Czech Republic	18.58	17.76	17.35	18.62	18.99	18.49	18.99	
	Mounia Gasmi; Algeria	x	x	x	x	x	x	NM	

=== F51 ===
The event took place on 16 July.

Rank	Athlete	1	2	3	4	5	6	Best	Notes
1st place, gold medalist(s)	Zoia Ovsii; Ukraine	22.28	22.42	22.47	22.90	23.98	22.92	23.98	SB
2nd place, silver medalist(s)	Cassie Mitchell; United States	x	x	20.95	x	x	20.61	20.95	SB
3rd place, bronze medalist(s)	Ekta Bhyan; India	15.65	14.57	17.93	x	16.15	17.91	17.93	AR
4	Kashish Lakra; India	13.24	x	x	10.61	11.82	x	13.24	PB
5	Mrunmaiy Abroal; India	x	9.70	x	x	x	x	9.70	
	Nadjet Boucherf; Algeria	x	x	x	x	x	x	x	DNS
