= Athletics at the 2016 Summer Paralympics – Women's club throw =

The women's club throw athletics event for the 2016 Summer Paralympics took place at the Estádio Olímpico João Havelange on September 9 and 11. One event was contested for 2 different classifications.

== Results ==
=== F31/32 ===
The F31/32 club throw was held on 9 September.

Rank	Athlete	Nationality	Class	1	2	3	4	5	6	Result	Notes
1st place, gold medalist(s)	Maroua Ibrahmi	Tunisia	F32	22.33	23.33	24.41	23.96	24.15	26.93	26.93	WR
2nd place, silver medalist(s)	Mounia Gasmi	Algeria	F32	24.60	25.24	23.98	25.41	24.28	x	25.41	PB
3rd place, bronze medalist(s)	Gemma Prescott	Great Britain	F32	16.22	x	19.77	15.86	17.78	16.18	19.77	
4	Abbie Hunnisett	Great Britain	F32	19.00	x	15.66	16.80	16.39	12.94	19.00	
5	Zenab Albreiki	United Arab Emirates	F32	16.01	16.84	16.64	14.28	15.85	14.83	16.84	SB
6	Noura Alktebi	United Arab Emirates	F32	15.97	14.67	14.98	15.41	13.53	15.60	15.97	
7	Saida Nayli	Tunisia	F32	14.97	14.22	13.48	13.93	14.61	15.13	15.13	

=== F51 ===
The F51 club throw was held on the 11 September.

Rank	Athlete	Nationality	Class	1	2	3	4	5	6	Result	Notes
1st place, gold medalist(s)	Joanna Butterfield	Great Britain	F51	22.60	22.81	22.33	19.57	20.92	21.48	22.81	WR
2nd place, silver medalist(s)	Zoia Ovsii	Ukraine	F51	21.50	22.18	21.59	21.29	21.84	22.21	22.21	PB
3rd place, bronze medalist(s)	Cassie Mitchell	United States	F51	X	19.78	21.84	X	19.96	21.66	21.84	PB
4	Kylie Grimes	Great Britain	F51	17.07	18.75	X	X	18.08	X	18.75	
5	Rachael Morrison	United States	F51	17.70	X	18.32	X	X	X	18.32	
6	Dana-Gaye Weller	Jamaica	F51	10.61	12.21	X	9.97	11.00	X	12.21	PB
7	Zena Cole	United States	F51	9.74	11.17	10.64	10.87	9.66	10.36	11.17	
