= 2018 World Para Athletics European Championships – Women's club throw =

The women's club throw at the 2018 World Para Athletics European Championships was held at the Friedrich-Ludwig-Jahn-Sportpark in Berlin from 20–26 August. 2 classification finals are held in all over this event.

== Medalists ==
Event	Gold		Silver		Bronze	
F32	Anastasiia Moskalenko (UKR)	19.42	Hanna Wichmann (GER)	16.63	Anna Muzikova (CZE)	16.24
F51	Zoia Ovsii (UKR)	24.31 WR	Joanna Butterfield (GBR)	21.53	no medal awarded	
WR world record | AR area record | CR championship record | GR games record | NR national record | OR Olympic record | PB personal best | SB season best | WL world leading (in a given season)

== See also ==
- List of IPC world records in athletics

== See also ==
- List of IPC world records in athletics
