= Athletics at the 2020 Summer Paralympics – Women's club throw =

The Women's club throw athletics events for the 2020 Summer Paralympics took place at the Tokyo National Stadium on August 27 and September 3, 2021. A total of 2 events were contested in this discipline.

== Schedule ==
R	Round 1	½	Semifinals	F	Final

Date	Fri 27		Sat 28		Sun 29		Mon 30		Tue 31		Wed 1		Thu 2		Fri 3	
Event	M	E	M	E	M	E	M	E	M	E	M	E	M	E	M	E
F32		F														
F51																F

== Medal summary ==
The following is a summary of the medals awarded across all club throw events.

Classification	Gold		Silver		Bronze	
F32	Róża Kozakowska; Poland	28.74 WR	Anastasiia Moskalenko; Ukraine	24.73	Mounia Gasmi; Algeria	23.29
F51	Zoia Ovsii; Ukraine	25.12 GR	Cassie Mitchell; United States	24.18 AR	Elena Gorlova; RPC	24.08

== Results ==
=== F32 ===
Records

Prior to this competition, the existing world, Paralympic, and area records were as follows:

World record	Maroua Brahmi (TUN)	27.28	Marrakesh, Morocco	27 April 2019
Paralympic record	Maroua Brahmi (TUN)	26.93	Rio de Janeiro, Brazil	9 September 2016

Area	Distance (m)	Athlete	Nation
Africa	27.28 WR	Maroua Brahmi	Tunisia
America	17.44	Marilu Romina Fernandez	Argentina
Asia	19.24	Noura Alktebi	United Arab Emirates
Europe	21.84	Record Mark	
Oceania	15.40	Record Mark	

Results

The final in this classification took place on 27 August 2021, at 19:10:

Rank	Athlete	Nationality	1	2	3	4	5	6	Best	Notes
1st place, gold medalist(s)	Róża Kozakowska	Poland	9.07	22.79	28.74	11.05	16.03	14.76	28.74	WR
2nd place, silver medalist(s)	Anastasiia Moskalenko	Ukraine	22.46	23.87	23.77	x	24.61	24.73	24.73	PB
3rd place, bronze medalist(s)	Mounia Gasmi	Algeria	x	21.04	x	x	23.29	x	23.29	
4	Hind Frioua	Morocco	19.37	20.42	18.99	19.01	16.39	18.24	20.42	
5	Marilu Romina Fernandez	Argentina	17.95	19.71	15.05	18.13	16.61	19.13	19.71	AR
6	Noura Alktebi	United Arab Emirates	18.06	14.76	17.26	14.36	17.41	18.79	18.79	
7	Gemma Prescott	Great Britain	18.13	17.93	18.28	16.99	18.13	17.22	18.28	
8	Alia Issa	Refugee Paralympic Team	15.15	14.02	16.33	13.37	5.85	12.33	16.33	
9	Baiba Rorbaha	Latvia	15.78	16.32	x	15.20	x	x	16.32	PB

=== F51 ===
Records

Prior to this competition, the existing world, Paralympic, and area records were as follows:

World record	Zoia Ovsii (UKR)	25.23	Dubai, United Arab Emirates	11 November 2019
Paralympic record	Jo Butterfield (GBR)	22.81	Rio de Janeiro, Brazil	11 September 2016

Area	Distance (m)	Athlete	Nation
Africa	12.61	Nadjet Boucherf	Algeria
America	23.82	Rachael Morrison	United States
Asia	16.63	Ekta Bhyan	India
Europe	25.23 WR	Zoia Ovsii	Ukraine
Oceania	Vacant		

Results

The final in this classification took place on 3 September 2021, at 19:05:

Rank	Athlete	Nationality	1	2	3	4	5	6	Best	Notes
1st place, gold medalist(s)	Zoia Ovsii	Ukraine	24.41	24.85	24.81	24.83	25.12	24.20	25.12	GR
2nd place, silver medalist(s)	Cassie Mitchell	United States	23.38	24.16	23.58	24.18	23.24	23.39	24.18	AR
3rd place, bronze medalist(s)	Elena Gorlova	RPC	23.60	23.46	23.68	24.03	24.08	23.69	24.08	PB
4	Joanna Butterfield	Great Britain	21.03	21.77	19.73	20.27	x	21.37	21.77	SB
5	Nadjet Boucherf	Algeria	10.31	12.21	12.85	13.01	12.46	12.38	13.01	AR
6	Kashish Lakra	India	12.14	12.55	11.97	12.66	x	x	12.66	SB
7	Dhouda Chelhi	Tunisia	11.33	7.57	11.40	11.90	11.01	11.58	11.90	
8	Ekta Bhyan	India	x	x	7.07	2.69	8.38	5.54	8.38	SB
