= 2017 World Para Athletics Championships – Men's club throw =

The men's club throw at the 2017 World ParaAthletics Championships was held at the Olympic Stadium in London from 14 to 23 July.

== Medalists ==
Event	Gold		Silver		Bronze	
F32	Lahouari Bahlaz; Algeria	34.31 SB	Maciej Sochal; Poland	33.22 SB	Stephen Miller; Great Britain	29.32
F51	Zeljko Dimitrijevic; Serbia	31.99 WR	Amit Kumar Kumar; India	30.25 AR	Milos Mitic; Serbia	29.06 PB
WR world record | AR area record | CR championship record | GR games record | NR national record | OR Olympic record | PB personal best | SB season best | WL world leading (in a given season)

== See also ==
- List of IPC world records in athletics
