= 2017 World Para Athletics Championships – Women's club throw =

The women's club throw at the 2017 World Para Athletics Championships was held at the Olympic Stadium in London from 14 to 23 July.

== Medalists ==
Event	Gold		Silver		Bronze	
F32	Mounia Gasmi; Algeria	25.07	Maroua Ibrahmi; Tunisia	24.52 SB	Gemma Prescott; Great Britain	19.97 PB
F51	Zoia Ovsii; Ukraine	23.74 CR	Cassie Mitchell; United States	23.37 PB	Rachael Morrison; United States	22.92
WR world record | AR area record | CR championship record | GR games record | NR national record | OR Olympic record | PB personal best | SB season best | WL world leading (in a given season)

== See also ==
- List of IPC world records in athletics
