= Athletics at the 2024 Summer Paralympics – Women's club throw F32 =

Women's Club throw F32 at the XVII Paralympic Games
- Venue: Stade de France
- Dates: 30 August 2024
- Competitors: 16 from 12 nations

Medalists
1st place, gold medalist(s)		Maroua Brahmi	Tunisia
2nd place, silver medalist(s)		Parastoo Habibi	Iran
3rd place, bronze medalist(s)		Giovanna Boscolo	Brazil

The Athletics at the 2024 Summer Paralympics – Women's club throw F32 event at the 2024 Summer Paralympics in Paris, took place on 30 August 2024.

== Records ==
Prior to the competition, the existing records were as follows:

World record	Róża Kozakowska (POL)	28.77m	(Poland) Kraków	14 June 2024
Paralympic record	Róża Kozakowska (POL)	28.74m	(Japan) Tokyo	27 August 2021

== Results ==
=== Final ===
The final in this classification took place on 30 August 2024:

Rank	Athlete	Nationality	Class	1	2	3	4	5	6	Best	Notes
1st place, gold medalist(s)	Maroua Brahmi	Tunisia	F32	22.79	27.78	27.33	26.09	25.84	29.00	29.00	WR
2nd place, silver medalist(s)	Parastoo Habibi	Iran	F32	24.31	23.72	26.29	22.37	25.54	26.06	26.29	AR
3rd place, bronze medalist(s)	Giovanna Boscolo	Brazil	F32	20.04	17.44	26.01	22.56	21.80	17.07	26.01	
4	Anastasiia Moskalenko	Ukraine	F32	23.66	25.08	21.50	24.58	23.97	24.87	25.08	
5	Wanna Brito	Brazil	F32	23.00	20.14	18.74	23.47	22.17	22.31	23.47	PB
6	Marilu Romina Fernandez	Argentina	F32	20.14	21.59	18.13	20.41	22.11	20.53	21.59	
7	Maxiliyo Akramova	Uzbekistan	F32	19.63	20.41	20.78	18.84	19.83	18.74	20.78	
8	Noura Alktebi	United Arab Emirates	F32	12.07	17.31	17.79	17.85	17.29	20.69	20.69	
9	Thekra Alkaabi	United Arab Emirates	F32	19.28	20.29	16.50	15.69	19.40	18.77	20.29	
10	Evgeniia Galaktionova	Neutral Paralympic Athletes	F32	18.29	20.28	17.88	1.575	19.63	19.38	20.28	SB
11	Oumaima Oubraym	Morocco	F32	16.86	11.15	16.82	18.82	17.98	6.32	18.82	
12	Mounia Gasmi	Algeria	F32	X	15.80	16.24	18.01	18.66	17.64	18.66	
13	Rosemary Little	Australia	F32	x	4.71	8.77	x	16.65	x	16.65	AR
14	Nargiza Safarova	Neutral Paralympic Athletes	F32	12.74	14.24	14.37	14.75	15.13	15.35	15.35	PB
15	Sarah Clifton-Bligh	Australia	F32	14.70	14.31	13.84	9.17	9.40	13.37	14.70	
—	Róża Kozakowska	Poland	F32							—	DQ R6.16.1

Notes: Róża Kozakowska initially claimed Gold, but was disqualified after a protest under R6.16.1 due to improper equipment.
