= 2024 World Para Athletics Championships – Women's club throw =

The women's club throw at the 2024 World Para Athletics Championships were held in Kobe.

== Medalists ==
Event	Gold	Silver	Bronze
F32	Wanna Helena Brito Oliveira; Brazil	Maroua Brahmi; Tunisia	Giovanna Boscolo Castilho Gonçalves; Brazil
F51	Ekta Bhyan; India	Kashish Lakra; India	Nadjet Boucherf; Algeria
