= 2016 IPC Athletics European Championships – Women's club throw =

The women's club throw at the 2016 IPC Athletics European Championships was held at the Stadio Olimpico Carlo Zecchini in Grosseto from 11 to 16 June.

== Medalists ==
Event	Gold		Silver		Bronze	
F31/32/51	Joanna Butterfield (F51); Great Britain	22.75 WR; 1100 pts	Gemma Prescott (F32); Great Britain	21.08 CR; 886 pts	Abbie Hunnisett (F32); Great Britain	20.32 SB; 838 pts
WR world record | AR area record | CR championship record | GR games record | NR national record | OR Olympic record | PB personal best | SB season best | WL world leading (in a given season)

== See also ==
- List of IPC world records in athletics
