= 2015 IPC Athletics World Championships – Women's club throw =

The women's club throw at the 2015 IPC Athletics World Championships was held at the Suheim Bin Hamad Stadium in Doha from 22–31 October.

== Medalists ==
Event	Gold		Silver		Bronze	
F32	Maroua Ibrahmi; Tunisia	22.58	Mounia Gasmi; Algeria	22.54 PB	Abbie Hunnisett; Great Britain	21.09 PB
F51	Joanna Butterfield; Great Britain	21.44 CR	Rachael Morrison; United States	18.85 SB	Becky Richter; Canada	15.11
WR world record | AR area record | CR championship record | GR games record | NR national record | OR Olympic record | PB personal best | SB season best | WL world leading (in a given season)

== See also ==
- List of IPC world records in athletics
