= 2021 World Para Athletics European Championships – Women's club throw =

Two women's club throw events were held at the 2021 World Para Athletics European Championships in Bydgoszcz, Poland.

== Medalists ==
Event	Gold		Silver		Bronze	
F32	Anastasiia Moskalenko (UKR)	20.24	Anna Muzikova (CZE)	17.82 PB	Baiba Rorbaha (LAT)	15.57 PB
F51	Elena Gorlova (RUS)	22.80	Zoia Ovsii (UKR)	22.15	Not awarded	
WR world record | ER European record | CR championship record | NR national record | WL world leading | EL European leading | PB personal best | SB seasonal best

== See also ==
- List of IPC world records in athletics
