= Giovanna Boscolo =

Brazilian Paralympic athlete (born 2002)

Personal information
- Full name: Giovanna Boscolo Castilho Gonçalves
- Born: 25 March 2002 (age 24) São Paulo, Brazil

Sport
- Country: Brazil
- Sport: Para athletics
- Disability class: F32
- Events: shot put club throw
Medal record
Para athletics
Representing Brazil
Paralympic Games
Bronze medal – third place	2024 Paris	Club throw F32
World Championships
Bronze medal – third place	2025 New Delhi	Club throw F32

Giovanna Boscolo Castilho Gonçalves (born 25 March 2002) is a Brazilian actress and para-athlete competing in throwing events: shot put and club throw. She represented Brazil at the 2024 Summer Paralympics.

== Career ==
She represented Brazil at the 2024 Summer Paralympics and won a bronze medal in the club throw F32 event. She competed at the 2025 World Para Athletics Championships and won a bronze medal in the club throw F32 event with a throw of 27.09 metres.
