= Róża Kozakowska =

Polish Paralympic athlete (born 1989)

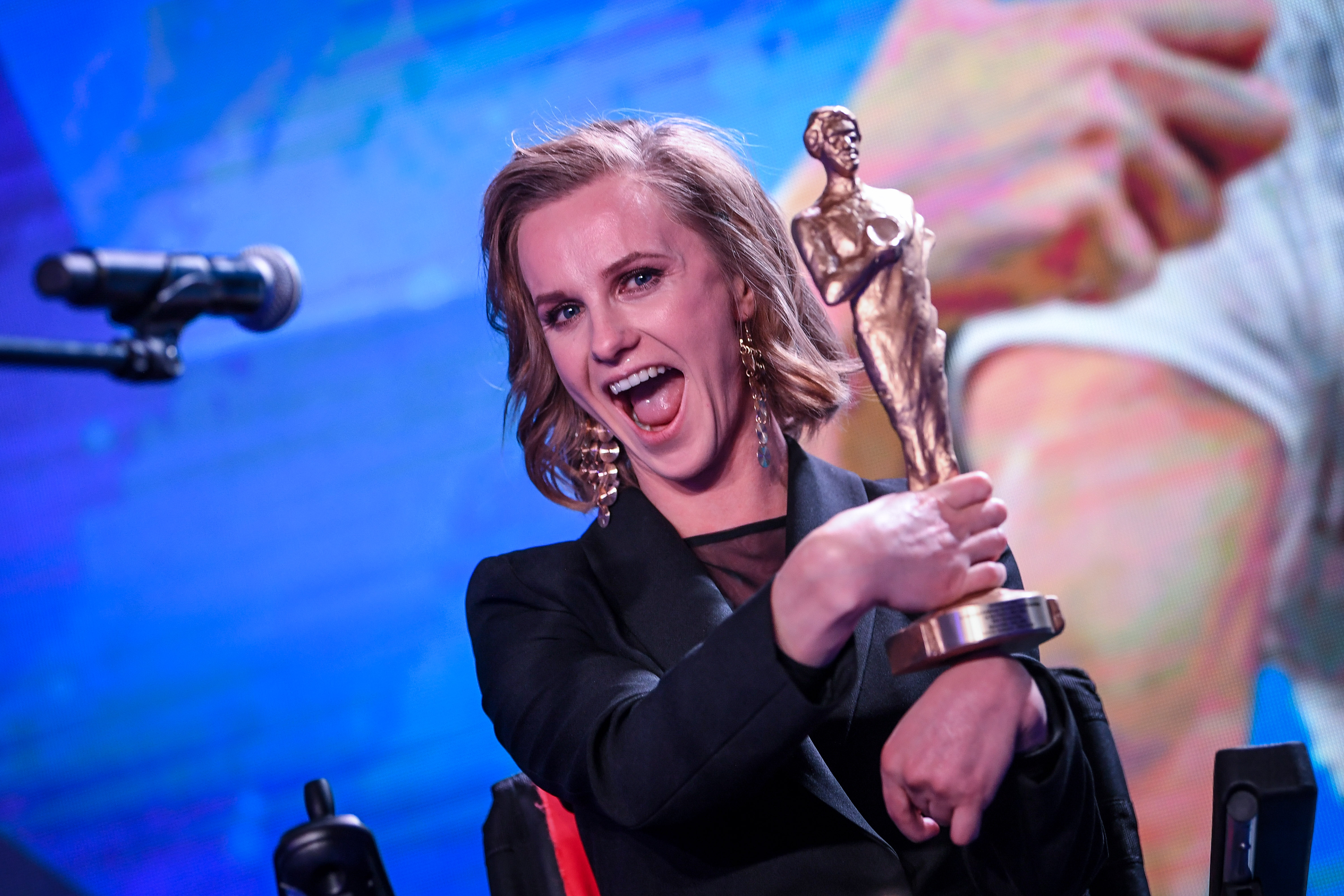

Personal information
- Born: 26 August 1989 (age 36) Zduńska Wola, Poland

Sport
- Country: Poland
- Sport: Para-athletics
- Disability class: F32
- Events: Club throw; Shot put
Medal record
Women's para-athletics
Representing Poland
Paralympic Games
Gold medal – first place	2020 Tokyo	Club throw F32
Silver medal – second place	2020 Tokyo	Shot put F32
World Championships
Gold medal – first place	2023 Paris	Club throw F32
Gold medal – first place	2025 New Delhi	Club throw F32
European Championships
Bronze medal – third place	2021 Bydgoszcz	Shot put F32

Róża Kozakowska (born 26 August 1989) is a Polish Paralympic athlete competing in F32-classification events. She won the gold medal in the women's club throw F32 event at the 2020 Summer Paralympics held in Tokyo, Japan. She also set a new world record of 28.74 metres. She won the silver medal in the women's shot put F32 event.

== Career ==
Kozakowska competed in the women's long jump T38 event at the 2019 World Para Athletics Championships held in Dubai, United Arab Emirates. In June 2021, she won the bronze medal in the women's shot put F32 event at the 2021 World Para Athletics European Championships held in Bydgoszcz, Poland. She came first in the F32 Club throw with the longest throw ever of 28.74m. The Ukrainian Anastasiia Moskalenko took the silver, Mounia Gasmi of Algeria had the bronze and Alia Issa, the first woman to represent the Refugee Paralympic Team, came eighth.

At the 2024 Summer Paralympics she initially threw a World Record distance of 31.30m to claim Gold, but was disqualified for using improper equipment after a protest by the Brazilian delegation.
