= Zoia Ovsii =

Ukrainian Paralympic athlete (born 1994)

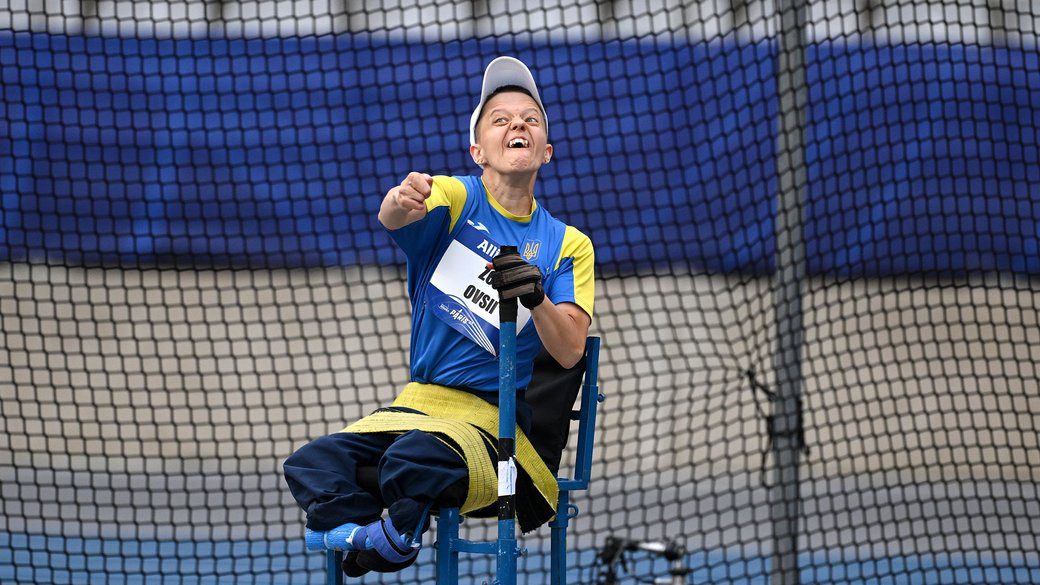
- Ovsii at the 2024 Summer Paralympics

Personal information
- Native name: Зоя Овсій
- Born: 30 August 1994 (age 31)

Sport
- Country: Ukraine
- Sport: Para-athletics
- Disability: Arthrogryposis
- Disability class: F51
- Events: Club throw; Discus throw
Medal record
Representing Ukraine
Women's para-athletics
Paralympic Games
Gold medal – first place	2020 Tokyo	Club throw F51
Silver medal – second place	2016 Rio de Janeiro	Club throw F51
Bronze medal – third place	2016 Rio de Janeiro	Discus throw F52
Bronze medal – third place	2020 Tokyo	Discus throw F53
Bronze medal – third place	2024 Paris	Discus throw F53
World Championships
Gold medal – first place	2017 London	Club throw F51
Gold medal – first place	2019 Dubai	Club throw F51
Gold medal – first place	2023 Paris	Club throw F51
Gold medal – first place	2025 New Delhi	Club throw F51
Bronze medal – third place	2017 London	Discus throw F52
Bronze medal – third place	2019 Dubai	Discus throw F53
European Championships
Gold medal – first place	2018 Berlin	Club throw F51
Silver medal – second place	2018 Berlin	Discus throw F53
Silver medal – second place	2021 Bydgoszcz	Club throw F51
Silver medal – second place	2021 Bydgoszcz	Discus throw F53
Women's paracanoe
World Championships
Bronze medal – third place	2014 Moscow	V–1 200 m A

Zoia Ovsii (Ukrainian: Зоя Овсій, born 30 August 1994) is a Ukrainian Paralympic athlete competing in F51-classification throwing events. She won the gold medal in the women's club throw F51 event at the 2020 Summer Paralympics held in Tokyo, Japan. She also won the bronze medal in the women's discus throw F53 event. She won two medals at the 2016 Summer Paralympics in Rio de Janeiro, Brazil.

Ovsii is a three-time gold medalist in the women's club throw F51 event at the World Para Athletics Championships. She also won the gold medal in this event at the 2018 World Para Athletics European Championships in Berlin, Germany.

== Career ==
Ovsii represented Ukraine at the 2016 Summer Paralympics held in Rio de Janeiro, Brazil and she won two medals: the silver medal in the women's club throw F51 event and the bronze medal in the women's discus throw F52 event.

In 2014, Ovsii competed in paracanoeing at the ICF Canoe Sprint World Championships in Moscow, Russia and she won the bronze medal in the women's V–1 200 m A event.

At the 2018 World Para Athletics European Championships in Berlin, Germany, Ovsii set a new world record in the women's club throw F51. She also accomplished this feat at the 2019 World Para Athletics Championships held in Dubai, United Arab Emirates in the women's club throw F51 event with a distance of 25.23.

In 2021, Ovsii won the silver medal in the women's club throw F51 and women's discus throw F53 events at the World Para Athletics European Championships held in Bydgoszcz, Poland.

She won the gold medal in the women's club throw F51 event at the 2023 World Para Athletics Championships held in Paris, France. In 2024, Ovsii won the bronze medal in the women's discus throw F53 at the Summer Paralympics held in Paris, France. She won her medal with a season's best distance of 14.17 metres.

== Achievements ==
=== Club throw ===
Year	Competition	Venue	Position	Notes
2016	Summer Paralympics	Rio de Janeiro, Brazil	2nd	22.21 m
2017	World Championships	London, United Kingdom	1st	23.74 m
2018	European Championships	Berlin, Germany	1st	24.31 m
2019	World Championships	Dubai, United Arab Emirates	1st	25.23 m
2021	European Championships	Bydgoszcz, Poland	2nd	22.15 m
2021	Summer Paralympics	Tokyo, Japan	1st	25.12 m
2023	World Championships	Paris, France	1st	23.98 m

=== Discus throw ===
Year	Competition	Venue	Position	Notes
2016	Summer Paralympics	Rio de Janeiro, Brazil	3rd	12.17 m
2017	World Championships	London, United Kingdom	3rd	11.97 m
2018	European Championships	Berlin, Germany	2nd	13.04 m
2019	World Championships	Dubai, United Arab Emirates	3rd	13.52 m
2021	European Championships	Bydgoszcz, Poland	2nd	14.15 m
2021	Summer Paralympics	Tokyo, Japan	3rd	14.37 m
2024	Summer Paralympics	Paris, France	3rd	14.17 m
