= Takefumi =

- Gender: Male

Origin
- Origin: Japanese
- Meaning: Different meanings depending on the kanji used

Takefumi (written: 建文, 健史, 丈史 or 武文) is a masculine Japanese given name. Notable people with the name include:

- Takefumi Anryo (安陵 武文), Japanese Paralympic athlete
- Takefumi Haketa (composer) (羽毛田 丈史), Japanese composer
- Takefumi Sakata (坂田 健史) (born 1980), Japanese boxer
- Takefumi Toma (當間 建文) (born 1989), Japanese footballer
