= Stephen Miller (club thrower) =

British Paralympic athlete

Stephen Miller MBE
Personal information
- Full name: Stephen James Miller
- Born: 26 May 1980 (age 46)
Medal record
Men's para athletics
Representing Great Britain
Paralympic Games
Gold medal – first place	1996 Atlanta	Club throw F32/51
Gold medal – first place	2000 Sydney	Club throw F32/51
Gold medal – first place	2004 Athens	Club throw F32/51
Silver medal – second place	2008 Beijing	Club throw F32/51
Bronze medal – third place	2000 Sydney	Discus F32/51
Bronze medal – third place	2016 Rio de Janeiro	Club throw F32/51
World Championships
Gold medal – first place	1998 Birmingham	Club throw – F32
Gold medal – first place	2002 Lille	Club throw – F32
Gold medal – first place	2006 Assen	Club throw – F32
Silver medal – second place	2002 Lille	Discus throw – F32
Bronze medal – third place	2011 Christchurch	Club throw – F32
Bronze medal – third place	2017 London	Club throw – F32
European Championships
Gold medal – first place	2003 Assen	Club throw – F32
Gold medal – first place	2003 Assen	Discus throw – F32
Gold medal – first place	2005 Espoo	Club throw – F32
Gold medal – first place	2012 Stadskanaal	Club throw – F32
Silver medal – second place	2014 Swansea	Club throw – F32
Silver medal – second place	2018 Berlin	Club throw – F32
Bronze medal – third place	2016 Grosseto	Club throw – F32

Stephen James Miller MBE (born 27 May 1980) is a British athlete who competes in the fields of Paralympic club and discus throwing. He has won three gold, one silver, and one bronze medal in the F32/51 club throw at the Paralympics. In Paralympic F32/51 discus he won one bronze medal.

== Personal life ==
Stephen Miller was born 26 May 1980, in Cramlington, Northumberland. He started participating in athletics at the age of 11. He joined an after-school club, where he met Paralympian Norman Burns. Burns would later become his coach.

He married Rachel Toland in August 2013. He was able to walk down the aisle with her since he had hip replacement surgery the previous October, which he had delayed until after the 2012 London Paralympics.

He worked part-time as a web developer at Queen Elizabeth Hospital in Gateshead. Miller and his wife founded SMILE Through Sport in 2013. The foundation encourages disabled people to participate in sports. He currently lives in his hometown of Cramlington.

== Career ==
=== 1996 Paralympics ===
The 1996 Paralympic Games in Atlanta were Miller's first Paralympic Games. He competed in the F50 club throw, winning with a distance of 25.84 metres. At the age of 16 he became Great Britain's youngest Paralympian or Olympian track and field competitors to win a gold medal.

=== 2000 Paralympics ===
He won gold in the club throw at the 2000 Paralympics in Sydney.

At the 2000 Games he originally placed fourth in discus with a throw of 14.99 metres. His team lodged a complaint against gold-medal winner Robert Jachimowicz, saying his disability status was improperly classified. Jachimowicz was disqualified, and Miller advanced to the bronze medal position.

=== 2004 Paralympics ===
Miller competed in the F32/51 club throw at the 2004 Paralympics in Athens. He won the event with a world-record breaking throw of 33.53 metres, beating the record set in 2000 by over seven metres. All six of his attempts would have been long enough to secure the gold medal.

Miller won several medals at the Cerebral Palsy World Championships in 2005, including gold in the F32 club and gold in the F32 discus. He won his third consecutive gold medal for club throwing at the World Championships in 2006.

=== 2008 Paralympics ===
While training at the Australian Institute of Sport for the 2008 Paralympic Games, Miller broke the F32 club throw world record with a distance of 34.93 metres. Miller had won gold in the club throw in the previous three Paralympic Games. Despite throwing for a personal best of 34.37 metres, he lost to new world-record holder Mourad Idoudi of Tunisia. Miller had owned that record since 1997. He finished the event with a silver medal at the 2008 Summer Paralympics in Beijing.

=== 2012 Paralympics ===
He was selected as captain of the men's athletics squad for Great Britain at the 2012 Summer Paralympics. He had hip problems that required surgery to fix, and doctors thought he would take about a year to recover. He did not want to miss his home Paralympic Games in London so he competed through the pain. He failed to qualify for the finals. He underwent surgery for his hip following the Games. New Paralympic Committee rules cut off his funding, as only athletes projected to medal at the next Games were funded.

=== 2016 Paralympics ===
Miller won a silver medal at the 2014 European Championships.

With his poor performance at the 2012 Paralympics, his goal was to be on the podium at the 2016 Paralympic Games. Initially his mother, who is also his coach, did not have enough funds to travel to the Games. Former Newcastle United owner John Hall donated money to allow her to attend the event. There were ten competitors in the F32 club throw, but four failed to show up to the event prior to the start time. He earned a bronze medal with a season-best throw of 31.58 metres.

He also won a bronze medal at the IPC World Championships in 2017 and a silver medal at the European Championships in 2018.

=== 2020 Paralympics ===
Miller started a crowdfunding campaign to facilitate training and competition opportunities in a bid to get to the 2020 Paralympic Games in Tokyo. He was not selected for the event.

=== Retirement ===
In June 2024, Miller announced he would be retiring at the end of that year's season having not made an international appearance since finishing fourth at European Championships three years earlier.

== Awards and honours ==
Miller was awarded the Freedom of Gateshead on 25 June 2013. He was awarded the Freedom of Gateshead. He was awarded the Freedom of Cramlington on 7 February 2014.

Miller was appointed Member of the Order of the British Empire (MBE) in the 2016 New Year Honours for services to sport.
