= Abbie Hunnisett =

British Paralympic athlete (born 1995)

Personal information
- Nationality: British
- Born: 28 October 1995 (age 30)

Sport
- Sport: Athletics
- Event: Club throw
- Club: Weir Archer Academy
- Coached by: Camilla Thrush

Achievements and titles
- Personal best: Club: 21.11m
Medal record
Track and field (athletics)
Representing Great Britain
IPC World Championships
Bronze medal – third place	2015 Doha	club throw – F32
IPC European Championships
Bronze medal – third place	2016 Grosseto	Club throw - F31/32/51

Abbie Hunnisett (born 28 October 1995) is a British parasport athlete who competes in the F32 club. In 2015 Hunnisett secured a bronze medal in the 2015 IPC Athletics World Championships in Doha while representing Great Britain.

== Personal history ==
Hunnisett was born in England in 1995 and grew up in East Grinstead, Sussex. Hunnisett, who has cerebral palsy, was educated at Treloar School before boarding at Valence School.

== Sporting career ==
Hunnisett was first introduced to the club throw when it was suggested to her by teachers. She kept up the sport for pleasure and fitness but after training over her summer holidays the improvements in her throws led her to seek out a sports club, and she was selected at an athletics development day. She joined Kingston Athletics Club and Polytechnic Harriers.

Hunnisett's first forays into competitive sports were at the Cerebral Palsy Sport Grand Prix in 2010 and 2011, where she threw sub tem metre distances. She was later classified as a F32 disability athlete, which meant she could officially compete at sporting meets. In 2012 Hunnissett entered the Lee Valley Indoor Disability Championships, winning the club throw with a distance of 14.59m. The following year she entered her first IPC Grand Prix, travelling to Germany to compete in Berlin. There she threw 12.17m to finish in third place. A week later she won first place at the England Athletics Senior Disability Championships with a distance of 16.28m. Her personal best in 2013 of 17.79m, achieved at the Kingston Open, placed her sixth in the world.

In 2014 Hunnisett joined the Weir Archer Academy and was selected for the Great Britain team to compete in her first major international competition, the 2014 IPC Athletics European Championships held in Swansea. Initially the club throw was to be contested as two events between the F32 and F51 athletes, but the competition was combined and the results decided by points. This left Hunnisett fourth just outside the medals with a throw of 18.52m.

The following year Hunnisett entered three IPC Grand Prix events in the buildup to the 2015 IPC Athletics World Championships in Doha. Her first Grand Prix saw her travel to Nottwil in Switzerland where she threw a personal best of 19.24 to take first place. Hunnisett followed this with a second place at the Berlin Grand Prix. Her third Grand Prix saw Hunnisett compete at the Anniversary Games in London where she threw over twenty metres in a competitive competition for the first time with a result of 21.01m. At the World Championships, Hunnisett entered the F32 club throw. She fouled her first two throws, but managed a distance of 21.09 on her final attempt of the first round. She was unable to better this result in the second round, but the throw was good enough to see her secure her first major international podium finish with a bronze medal.
