= Maroua Brahmi =

Tunisian Paralympic athlete

Personal information
- Native name: مروى براهمي
- Born: Maroua Brahmi; September 19, 1988 (age 38) Gafsa, Tunisia
- Years active: 2009–2019 (Track and field F32)
- Height: 1.65 m (5 ft 5 in)
- Weight: 50 kg (110 lb)

Sport
- Disability: Cerebral palsy
- Disability class: F32
- Club: Tunisian Federation of Sports for the Disabled: Gafsa, TUN
- Coached by: Mohammed Yahya
Medal record
Women's para athletics
Representing Tunisia
Paralympic Games
Gold medal – first place	2012 London	Club throw F31/32/51
Gold medal – first place	2016 Rio	Club throw F32
Gold medal – first place	2016 Rio	Shot Put F32
Gold medal – first place	2024 Paris	Club throw F32
Bronze medal – third place	2012 London	Shot Put F32/33/34
World Championships
Gold medal – first place	2011 Christchurch	Club throw F31/32/51
Gold medal – first place	2013 Lyon	Club throw F31/32/51
Gold medal – first place	2015 Doha	Club throw F32
Gold medal – first place	2015 Doha	Shot put F32
Gold medal – first place	2017 London	Shot put F32
Gold medal – first place	2019 Dubai	Club throw F32
Silver medal – second place	2017 London	Club throw F32
Silver medal – second place	2023 Paris	Club throw F32
Silver medal – second place	2024 Kobe	Club throw F32
Silver medal – second place	2025 New Delhi	Club throw F32
Bronze medal – third place	2024 Kobe	Shot put F32
Islamic Solidarity Games
Gold medal – first place	2025 Riyadh	Club throw F32

Maroua Brahmi (Arabic: مروى براهمي, born September 19, 1988) is a Paralympic athlete from Tunisia competing mainly in category F32 throwing events. She was the 2016 Paralympic Champion in club throw category F32 and the F32 shot put.

== Career ==
Impaired with cerebral palsy, Brahmi took to sport in 2008, she made her international debut in 2009, her first major international competition was at the 2011 IPC Athletics World Championships held in Christchurch, New Zealand, where she won a gold medal in the F31/F32/F51 club throw, she also came 11th in the F32/F34 shot put.

Brahmi competed in the 2012 Summer Paralympics in London, UK. There she won a gold medal in Women's club throw F31/32/51 and a bronze medal in the Women's shot put F32/33/34.

At the 2013 IPC Athletics World Championships in Lyon, France, on winning the gold medal in the club throw she broke the world record when throwing 24.15 meters, she also finished 4th in the shot put.

In the 2015 IPC Athletics World Championships in Doha, Qatar, she won gold again in the club throw she actually only beat Algerian thrower Mounia Gasmi by 4 centimeters and she followed that with the gold medal in the F32 shot put

She also managed to win two gold medals at the 2016 Summer Olympics, firstly winning the F32 club throw in a new world record distance of 26.93 meters, and again beating Mounia Gasmi who had to settle for silver medal again, then eight days later she won the F32 shot put throwing 5.76 meters which was a new Paralympic record, her nearest opponent was over a meter behind.

== Athletics ==
- Women's Club Throw - F31/32/51
- Women's Shot Put - F32/33/34
- Women's Club throw F32
- Women's Shot put F32
