= Elena Gorlova =

Russian Paralympic athlete (born 1981)

Personal information
- Born: 13 April 1981 (age 45) Tashkent, Uzbekistan

Sport
- Country: Russia
- Sport: Para-athletics
- Disability class: F51
- Events: Club throw; Discus throw
Medal record
Women's para-athletics
Representing RPC
Paralympic Games
Bronze medal – third place	2020 Tokyo	Club throw F51
World Championships
Representing Neutral Paralympic Athletes (NPA)
Bronze medal – third place	2024 Kobe	Discus throw F53
Representing Russia
World Championships
Bronze medal – third place	2019 Dubai	Club throw F51
European Championships
Gold medal – first place	2021 Bydgoszcz	Club throw F51
Bronze medal – third place	2021 Bydgoszcz	Discus throw F53

Elena Gorlova (born 13 April 1981) is a Russian Paralympic athlete. She won the bronze medal in the women's club throw F51 event at the 2020 Summer Paralympics held in Tokyo, Japan. She competed at the Summer Paralympics under the flag of the Russian Paralympic Committee.

== Career ==
At the 2019 World Para Athletics Championships held in Dubai, United Arab Emirates, she won the bronze medal in the women's club throw F51 event.
