= Ekta Bhyan =

Indian Paralympic athlete

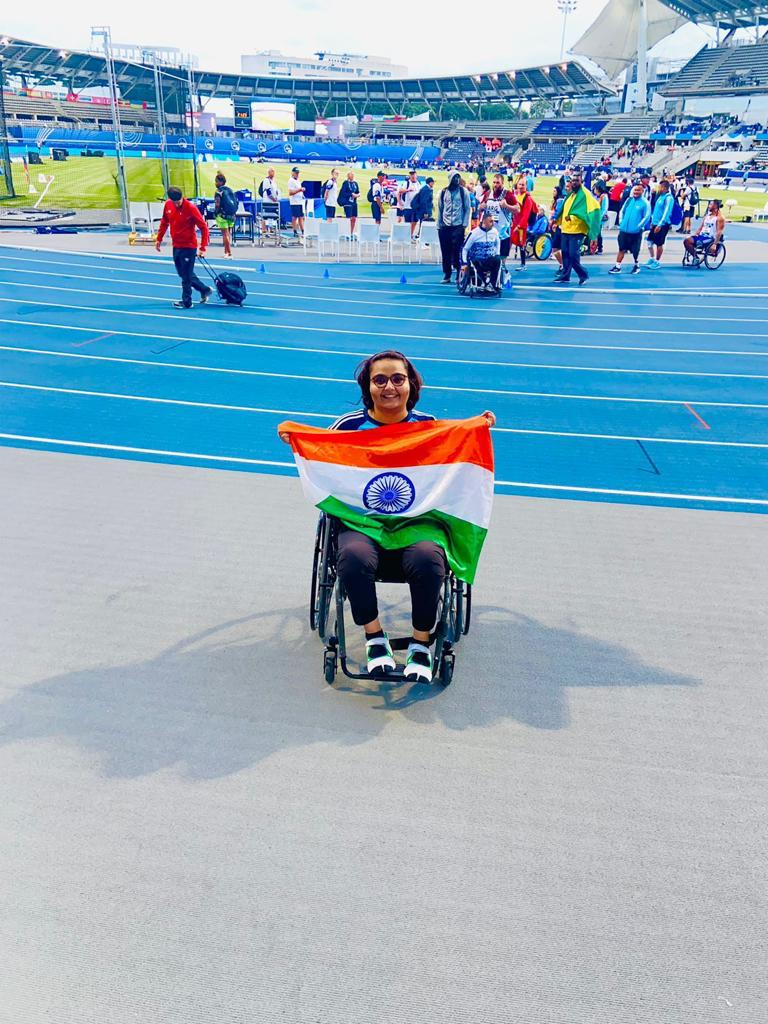
- Bhyan at the 2023 World Championships

Personal information
- Born: 7 June 1985 (age 41) Hisar, Haryana, India
- Occupation: Employment Officer
- Employer: Government of Haryana

Sport
- Sport: Para-athletics
- Disability class: F51
- Event: Club throw
Medal record
Women's para-athletics
Representing India
World Championships
Gold medal – first place	2024 Kobe	Club throw F51
Silver medal – second place	2025 New Delhi	Club throw F51
Bronze medal – third place	2023 Paris	Club throw F51
Asian Para Games
Gold medal – first place	2018 Jakarta	Club Throw F32/51
Bronze medal – third place	2022 Hangzhou	Club Throw F32/51

Ekta Bhyan (born 7 June 1985) is an Indian para club thrower who competes in the F51 event. She is a former World and Asian Para Games champion, having won gold in the women's club throw F51 event at the 2024 World Championships and the 2018 Asian Para Games. She has also represented India at the 2020 Tokyo Paralympics, where she finished sixth in the same event.

In 2026, she was conferred with the Arjuna Award for 2025.

== Early life ==
Bhyan was born in 1985 in Hissar, Haryana. In 2003, Ekta met with a road accident damaging her spinal cord. In 2015, she started playing as a way to get fitness back. She met athlete Amit Saroha, who inspired her to become a para-athlete like him. She started her training in discus throw events. She went through two operations and a lot of hard work for her rehabilitation which made her confident.

== Education ==
Bhyan completed her graduation and post-graduation in English from Hisar. She also, completed her bachelor's degree in education from Hisar and was selected as English PGT in Haryana Government. In 2011, she cleared the Haryana Civil Services Examination and is now working as an Employment Officer.

== Career ==
Bhyan was coached by Amit Saroha in club and discus throw. Her competitive career started with the 2016 IPC Grand Prix held at Berlin in July, where she bagged silver medal in club throw. She then competed in the 2016 National Para Athletics Championship held at Panchkula where she won gold medal in club throw and bronze medal in discus throw.

In 2017, she competed for the second time in the National Championship and secured gold medal in both the events. She also competed in the 2017 IPC Grand Prix held at Dubai. She was ranked 4th overall and set a new Asian record in both events. That year, Bhyan also competed in her first World Championships held at London where she was ranked 6th internationally and 1st in Asia, in club throw.

Bhyan, already the reigning national champion, completed her third stint at the National Championship, held in 2018 at Panchkula, bagging gold medal in both events. That year, she had her eyes set on the 2018 Asian Para Games to be held in October at Jakarta and was in preparation mode throughout the year. She followed up with the 2018 IPC Grand Prix held at Tunisia winning Gold in club throw and Bronze in discus throw.

In October 2018, Bhyan won India's fourth gold at the Asian Para Games by topping the women's club throw event in Kuala Lumpur. She produced her best throw in her fourth attempt, 16.02m, winning the F32/51 event ahead of UAE's Alkaabi Thekra, who threw 15.75m. Bhyan became the second Indian woman to win gold medal at the Asian Para Games and the very first from her home-state, Haryana.

In 2019, Bhyan had her second stint at the World Para Athletics Championship and won the Paralympic quota for Tokyo 2020 in the Women's Para Athletics category during 2019 World Championships, Dubai.

In 2021, Bhyan represented India at the 2020 Tokyo Paralympics and secured the 6th position. She went on to win a gold medal in the Club Throw event and the Discus Throw event at the Indian Open Para Athletics Championships. At the National Para Athletics Championships, Ekta again won a gold in both her events..

In 2022, she won a gold medal in the Club Throw and Discus Throw events at the National Para Athletics Championships. At the Indian Open Para Athletics Championships, she won a gold medal in the Club Throw event and a bronze medal in the Discus Throw event.

In 2023, she won the bronze medal in the Women's Club Throw F32/51 at the 2022 Asian Para Games held in Hangzhou, China and the bronze medal in the women's club throw F51 at the World Para Athletics Grand Prix in 2023 held in Dubai, UAE and the bronze medal in the women's club throw F51 event at the 2023 World Championships held in Paris. At the National Para Athletics Championship, Etka secured a gold medal in the Club Throw event and a bronze medal in the Discus Throw event. She also competed at the Indian Open Para Athletics Championships, wherein she won a gold medal in the club throw event and a medal at the discus throw event.

She is also supported by the GoSports Foundation through the Para Champions Programme and Welspun Corp through their Welspun Super Sport Women Program.

== Awards ==
Year	Award	Title
2018	National Award for Empowerment of Persons with Disabilities	Role Model
2018	State Award by Honourable Governor of Haryana	
2019	ESPN Athlete of the Year	Para Athlete
2020	Sportstar Aces Sportswoman of the Year	
2023	Times 40 Under 40 Leaders	
2026	Arjuna Award	Para-athletics (for 2025)

== Achievements ==
=== Asian Para Games ===
Year	Venue	Event	Result
2018	Jakarta, Indonesia	Club throw	Gold
2023	Hangzhou, China	Club throw	Bronze

=== World Para Athletics Championships ===
Year	Venue	Event	Result
2017	London, UK	Club throw	6th
2019	Dubai, UAE	Club throw	Won quota for 2020 Tokyo Paralympics
2023	Paris, France	Club throw	Bronze
2024	Kobe, Japan	Club throw	Gold
2025	New Delhi, India	Club throw	Silver

=== IPC Grand Prix ===
Year	Venue	Event	Result
2016	Berlin	Club throw	Silver
2017	Dubai	Club throw	4th Place†
2017	Dubai	Discus throw	4th Place†
2018	Tunisia	Club throw	Gold
2018	Tunisia	Discus throw	Bronze
2023	Dubai	Club throw	Bronze

† Set a new Asian record

=== National Para Athletics Championships ===
Year	Venue	Event	Result
2016	Panchkula	Club throw	Gold
2016	Panchkula	Discus throw	Bronze
2017	Jaipur	Club throw	Gold
2017	Jaipur	Discus throw	Gold
2018	Panchkula	Club throw	Gold
2018	Panchkula	Discus throw	Gold
2021	Bengaluru	Club throw	Gold
2021	Bengaluru	Discus throw	Gold
2022	Bhubaneswar	Club throw	Gold
2022	Bhubaneswar	Discus throw	Gold
2023	Pune	Club throw	Gold
2023	Pune	Discus throw	Bronze
