= Noura Alktebi =

United Arab Emirati Paralympic athlete

Personal information
- Born: 3 December 1992 (age 33) Al Ain, United Arab Emirates

Sport
- Country: United Arab Emirates
- Sport: Para-athletics
- Disability: Cerebral palsy
- Disability class: F32
- Events: Club throw Shot put
Medal record
Women's para-athletics
Representing United Arab Emirates
Paralympic Games
Silver medal – second place	2016 Rio de Janeiro	Shot put F32
Asian Para Games
Gold medal – first place	2022 Hangzhou	Shot put F32
Silver medal – second place	2014 Incheon	Club throw F31/32/51

Noura Khalifa Alktebi (born 3 December 1992) is a Paralympic athlete from the United Arab Emirates with cerebral palsy. She won the silver medal in the women's shot put F32 event at the 2016 Summer Paralympics held in Rio de Janeiro, Brazil. She also competed at the 2020 Summer Paralympics in Tokyo, Japan and the 2024 Summer Paralympics in Paris, France.

== Career ==
Alktebi represented the United Arab Emirates at the 2016 Summer Paralympics held in Rio de Janeiro, Brazil. She won the silver medal in the women's shot put F32 event. She also competed in the women's club throw event where she finished in 6th place.

In 2019, Alktebi finished in 4th place in both the women's shot put F32 and women's club throw F32 events at the 2019 World Para Athletics Championships held in Dubai, United Arab Emirates. As a result, she qualified to represent United Arab Emirates at the 2020 Summer Paralympics in these events.

Alktebi finished in 6th place in the women's club throw F32 event at the 2020 Summer Paralympics held in Tokyo, Japan. She finished in 4th place in the women's shot put F32 event.

In 2023, she competed in the women's club throw F32 event at the World Para Athletics Championships held in Paris, France. She finished in 8th place. Alktebi also finished in 8th place in the women's club throw F32 event at the 2024 Summer Paralympics in Paris, France.

== Achievements ==
Year	Competition	Venue	Position	Event	Notes
Representing United Arab Emirates
2016	Summer Paralympics	Rio de Janeiro, Brazil	2nd	Shot put	4.70 m
