= Anastasiia Moskalenko =

Ukrainian Paralympic athlete (born 2000)

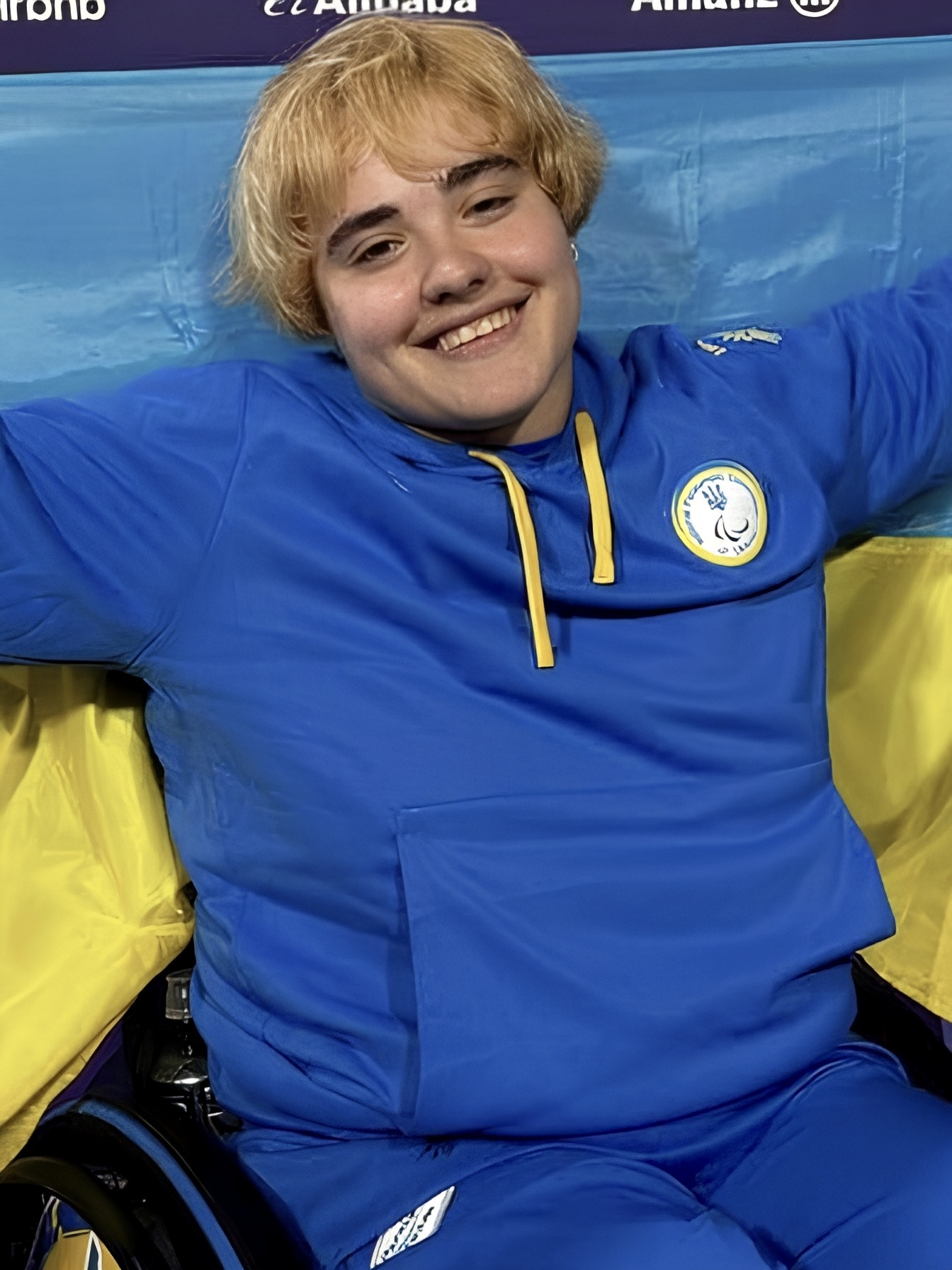
- Moskalenko at the 2024 Summer Paralympics

Personal information
- Born: 16 August 2000 (age 25)

Sport
- Country: Ukraine
- Sport: Para-athletics
- Disability class: F32
- Events: Club throw; Shot put
Medal record
Women's para-athletics
Representing Ukraine
Paralympic Games
| Gold medal – first place | 2020 Tokyo | Shot put F32 |
| Gold medal – first place | 2024 Paris | Shot put F32 |
| Silver medal – second place | 2020 Tokyo | Club throw F32 |
World Championships
| Gold medal – first place | 2019 Dubai | Shot put F32 |
| Gold medal – first place | 2023 Paris | Shot put F32 |
| Silver medal – second place | 2025 New Delhi | Shot put F32 |
| Bronze medal – third place | 2017 London | Shot put F32 |
| Bronze medal – third place | 2019 Dubai | Club throw F32 |
European Championships
| Gold medal – first place | 2018 Berlin | Club throw F51 |
| Gold medal – first place | 2018 Berlin | Shot put F32 |
| Gold medal – first place | 2021 Bydgoszcz | Club throw F32 |
| Silver medal – second place | 2021 Bydgoszcz | Shot put F32 |

Anastasiia Moskalenko (born 16 August 2000) is a Ukrainian Paralympic athlete competing in F32-classification club throw and shot put events. She won the gold medal with a new world record of 7.61 metres in the women's shot put F32 event at the 2020 Summer Paralympics held in Tokyo, Japan. She also won the silver medal in the women's club throw F32 event. She also set a new personal best in this event of 24.73 metres.

== Career ==
She is also a two-time gold medalist at the World Para Athletics Championships and a four-time medalist, including three golds, at the World Para Athletics European Championships.

In 2023, she won the gold medal in the women's shot put F32 event at the World Para Athletics Championships held in Paris, France. She also competed in the women's club throw F32 event. She finished in 4th place.

She finished in 4th place in the women's club throw F32 event at the 2024 Summer Paralympics in Paris, France.
