= 2017 World Para Athletics Championships – Women's 4 × 400 metres relay =

The women's 4 x 400 metres relay at the 2017 World Para Athletics Championships was held at the Olympic Stadium in London from 14 to 23 July.

== Medalists ==
| Event | Gold | | Silver | Bronze |
|---|---|---|---|---|
| T53/T54 | Turkey; Hamide Kurt; Nursah Usta; Zubeyde Supurgeci; Tugce Akgun | 4:57.16 | — | — |
WR world record | AR area record | CR championship record | GR games record | NR national record | OR Olympic record | PB personal best | SB season best | WL world leading (in a given season)

Events listed in pink were contested but no medals were awarded.

== See also ==
- List of IPC world records in athletics
