= 2017 World Para Athletics Championships – Women's discus throw =

The women's discus throw at the 2017 World Para Athletics Championships was held at the Olympic Stadium in London from 14 to 23 July.

== Medalists ==
| Event | Gold | | Silver | | Bronze | |
|---|---|---|---|---|---|---|
| F11 | Zhang Liangmin; China | 35.11 SB | Tang Hongxia; China | 33.63 | Izabela Campos; Brazil | 31.83 SB |
| F38 | Mi Na; China | 35.08 CR | Noelle Lenihan; Ireland | 32.12 CR | Li Yingli; China | 30.97 PB |
| F41 | Raoua Tlili; Tunisia | 32.29 CR | Niamh McCarthy; Ireland | 26.17 | Samar Ben Koelleb; Tunisia | 25.83 SB |
| F44 | Yao Juan; China | 39.72 SB | Yang Yue; China | 38.25 SB | Sarah Edmiston; Australia | 33.80 AR |
| F52 | Cassie Mitchell; United States | 13.23 WR | Rachael Morrison; United States | 12.35 SB | Zoia Ovsii; Ukraine | 11.97 |
| F55 | Diana Dadzite; Latvia | 23.18 PB | Érica Castaño; Colombia | 21.20 AR | Yang Liwan; China | 19.25 AR |
WR world record | AR area record | CR championship record | GR games record | NR national record | OR Olympic record | PB personal best | SB season best | WL world leading (in a given season)

Events listed in pink were contested but no medals were awarded.

== See also ==
- List of IPC world records in athletics
