= Parastoo Habibi =

Iranian Paralympic athlete (born 2002)

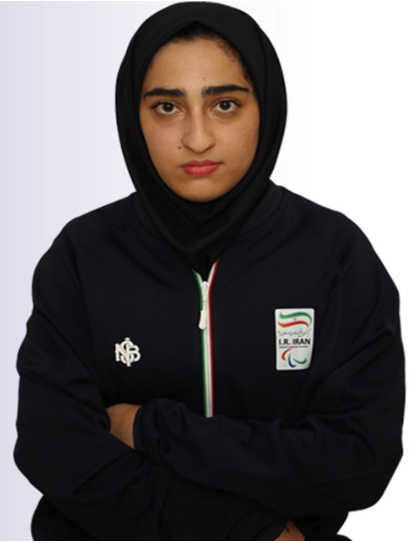
- Habibi in 2024

Personal information
- Nationality: Iranian
- Born: 9 December 2002 (age 23)
- Home town: Tehran, Iran

Sport
- Sport: Para-athletics
- Disability class: F32
- Events: shot put club throw
Medal record
Para-athletics
Representing Iran
Paralympic Games
Silver medal – second place	2024 Paris	Club throw F32
Asian Para Games
Gold medal – first place	2022 Hangzhou	Club throw F32/51
Silver medal – second place	2022 Hangzhou	Shot put F32
Silver medal – second place	2026 Aichi–Nagoya	Club throw F32/51
Islamic Solidarity Games
Bronze medal – third place	2025 Riyadh	Club throw F32

Parastoo Habibi (born 9 December 2002) is an Iranian para-athlete competing in throwing events: shot put and club throw. She represented Iran at the 2024 Summer Paralympics.

== Career ==
Habibi represented Iran at the 2022 Asian Para Games and won a gold medal in the club throw F32/51, and a silver medal in the shot put F32 events.

She represented Iran at the 2024 Summer Paralympics and won a bronze medal in the club throw F32 event.

In October 2026, she competed at the 2026 Asian Para Games and won a silver medal in the club throw F32/51 event.
