= Wanna Brito =

Brazilian para-athlete (born 1996)

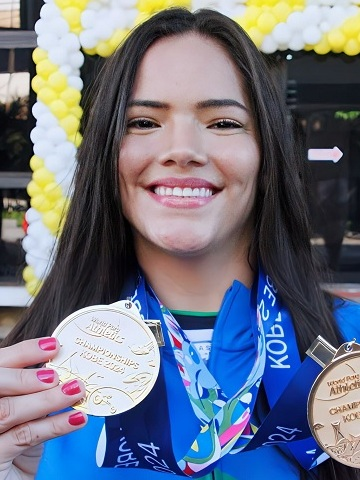
- Brito in May 2024

Personal information
- Full name: Wanna Helena Brito Oliveira
- Born: 12 July 1996 (age 30) Macapá, Amapá, Brazil

Sport
- Sport: Para-athletics
- Disability class: T32
- Events: Club throw; shot put
Medal record
Women's para athletics
Representing Brazil
Paralympic Games
Silver medal – second place	2024 Paris	Shot put F32
World Championships
Gold medal – first place	2024 Kobe	Club throw F32
Gold medal – first place	2024 Kobe	Shot put F32
Gold medal – first place	2025 New Delhi	Shot put F32
Bronze medal – third place	2023 Paris	Shot put F32
Parapan American Games
Gold medal – first place	2023 Santiago	Shot put F32/33/34

Wanna Helena Brito Oliveira (Note: This name uses Portuguese naming customs: the first or maternal family name is Brito and the second or paternal family name is Oliveira.) (born 12 July 1996) is a Brazilian para-athlete.

== Biography ==
Brito is from Macapá. She was born with cerebral palsy caused by a lack of oxygen to the brain at birth. Brito has a degree in physiotherapy.

== Career ==
Brito started swimming in 2018 and, at the end of 2019, switched to athletics at the encouragement of her coach. Her first competition was the Macapá Paralympic Meeting in 2020. In this competition, she set the best national mark in the shot put with 5.99 meters, which is also the third best world mark in this event in the F32 class. In the same tournament, she also set the record in the discus throw, with 11.84 meters.

At the Marrakech Grand Prix, the athlete from Amapá won gold in the F32 class of the shot put with a mark of 6.83 meters and also won silver in the club throw with a mark of 21.14 meters.

In May 2023, during the second phase of the Loterias Caixa Athletics Circuit, Brito broke two American records in the shot put and club throw in the F32 class. In the throw, she threw 6.98 meters and broke a mark that had been set 14 years ago by Argentine Marilu Romina Fernandez, who threw 5.14 meters in June 2009 at a championship held in Paris, France. In the club, the athlete threw 22.01 meters and surpassed the mark of Mexican Shantal Cobos Soltero, who had thrown 21.05 meters in July 2022, in Mexico. These results led her to 1st place in the world ranking for the shot put and 2nd place in the club throw in her class. In July 2023, at the World Para Athletics Championships, she won silver in the shot put and came fifth in the club throw.

Brito won gold at the World Para Athletics Championships in Japan on 14 May 2024, breaking the event record with a mark of 26.66 meters.
