= Rachael Morrison =

American Paralympic athlete

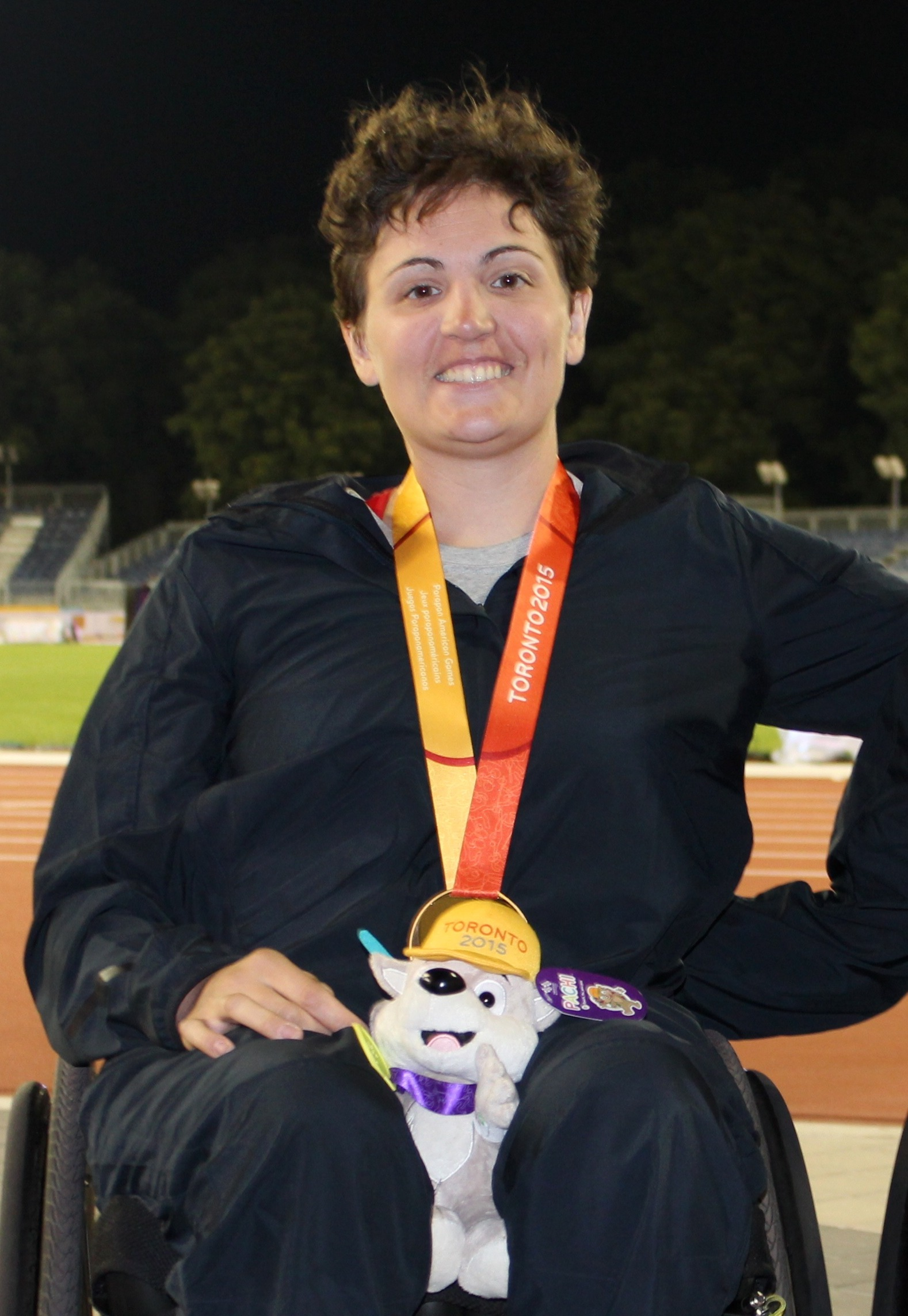
- Morrison at the 2015 Parapan American Games

Personal information
- Born: June 2, 1987 (age 39) Royal Oak, Michigan, U.S.
- Height: 5 ft 6 in (1.68 m)
- Weight: 160 lb (73 kg)

Sport
- Sport: Paralympic athletics
- Disability class: F51
- Event(s): Discus throw, club throw
Medal record
Women's para athletics
Representing the United States
Paralympic Games
Gold medal – first place	2016 Rio de Janeiro	Discus throw F51/52
IPC Athletics World Championships
Gold medal – first place	2015 Doha	Discus throw F51/52
Silver medal – second place	2015 Doha	Club throw F51
Silver medal – second place	2017 London	Discus throw F52
Bronze medal – third place	2017 London	Club throw F51
Parapan American Games
Gold medal – first place	2015 Toronto	Discus throw F51/52
Silver medal – second place	2015 Toronto	Club throw F31/32/51

Rachael Morrison (born June 2, 1987) is an American Paralympic athlete. She competes in the discus throw and club throw and holds world records in both events. She won the discus throw at the 2015 World Championships, 2015 Parapan American Games, and 2016 Paralympics.

Morrison was an active able-bodied athlete before becoming quadriplegic in 2010 due to transverse myelitis, a rare condition that damages the spinal cord. After that, she played wheelchair basketball and rugby before changing to athletics in 2014.
