= Gemma Prescott =

British Paralympic athlete

Personal information
- Nationality: British
- Born: 25 September 1983 (age 42) Truro, England
- Height: 155 cm (5 ft 1 in) (2012)
- Weight: 70 kg (154 lb) (2012)

Sport
- Country: England, Great Britain
- Sport: Athletics
- Event(s): Shot put Club; Discus
- Club: BWAA
- Coached by: Michael Woods

Achievements and titles
- Paralympic finals: 2012
- Personal best(s): Shot Put: 5.76m Club: 20.50m
Medal record
Representing Great Britain
Athletics
Paralympic Games
Bronze medal – third place	2012 London	Women's club throw F31/F32/F51
IPC World Championships
Bronze medal – third place	2017 London	Club throw – F32
IPC European Championships
Silver medal – second place	2016 Grosseto	Club throw – F31/32/51
Bronze medal – third place	2014 Swansea	Club throw – F32/51
Representing England
Athletics
Commonwealth Games
Bronze medal – third place	2010 Delhi	Women's shot put F32–34/52/53

Gemma Louise Prescott (born 25 September 1983 in Truro) is a British Paralympian track and field athlete competing in F32 throwing events. Prescott represented England in the 2010 Commonwealth Games, taking the bronze medal in the SP shot put. She has represented the Great Britain team twice in the 2008 Summer Paralympics in Beijing and the 2012 Summer Paralympics in London.

== Career history ==
Prescott was born in Truro in 1983. Prescott, who has cerebral palsy, attended Great Sankey High School. She was introduced to athletics after being invited to a 'have a go' day at the age of 15. Prescott explored wheelchair racing and swimming before settling on the throwing events and was invited to compete at the DSE National Junior Championships in Blackpool in 1998. After leaving school, Presott matriculated to the University of St Andrews, where she graduated with a master's degree in mathematics.

In 2005 Prescott entered the Paralympic World Cup taking gold in the F32 discus and silver in the F32 shot. In 2008 qualified for Great Britain team at the Beijing Paralympics. She entered into the discus and shot put finishing 7th and 8th respectively.

In 2010, she was selected for the England team for the 2010 Commonwealth Games in Delhi. She entered in the shot put, the only women's throwing event for athletes with a disability at the tournament. Prescott threw 5.54m which was good enough to take the bronze medal. 2010 also saw her take gold at the German National Disability Championships. Prescott also made the decision in 2010 to begin the switch from discus to the club throw, as the F32 discus had been dropped from the 2012 Summer Paralympics' programme. Her personal best at the club throw at the end of the season was a distance of 14.52m achieved in Stoke at a BWAA International.

The next year she was selected to represent Great Britain at the 2011 IPC Athletics World Championships in Christchurch, New Zealand. She entered both the shot put and club throw, finishing 7th in the shot, but took the bronze medal in the club throw with a new personal best of 16.40m. Prescott improved her club further five months later, throwing 17.18 at the BWAA Grand Prix in Stoke. In 2012, she was selected for the Great Britain team at the Summer Paralympics, entering the club throw and F32 shot put. She had improved on her personal best in the club going into the Games, with a 19.62m throw at Chelmsford in May. In the Paralympic club throw finals she threw 20.50m for 1015 points, a British and European record, taking the bronze medal.

She finished in 7th place in the women's club throw F32 event at the 2020 Summer Paralympics held in Tokyo, Japan.
