= Cassie Mitchell =

American Paralympic athlete (born 1981)

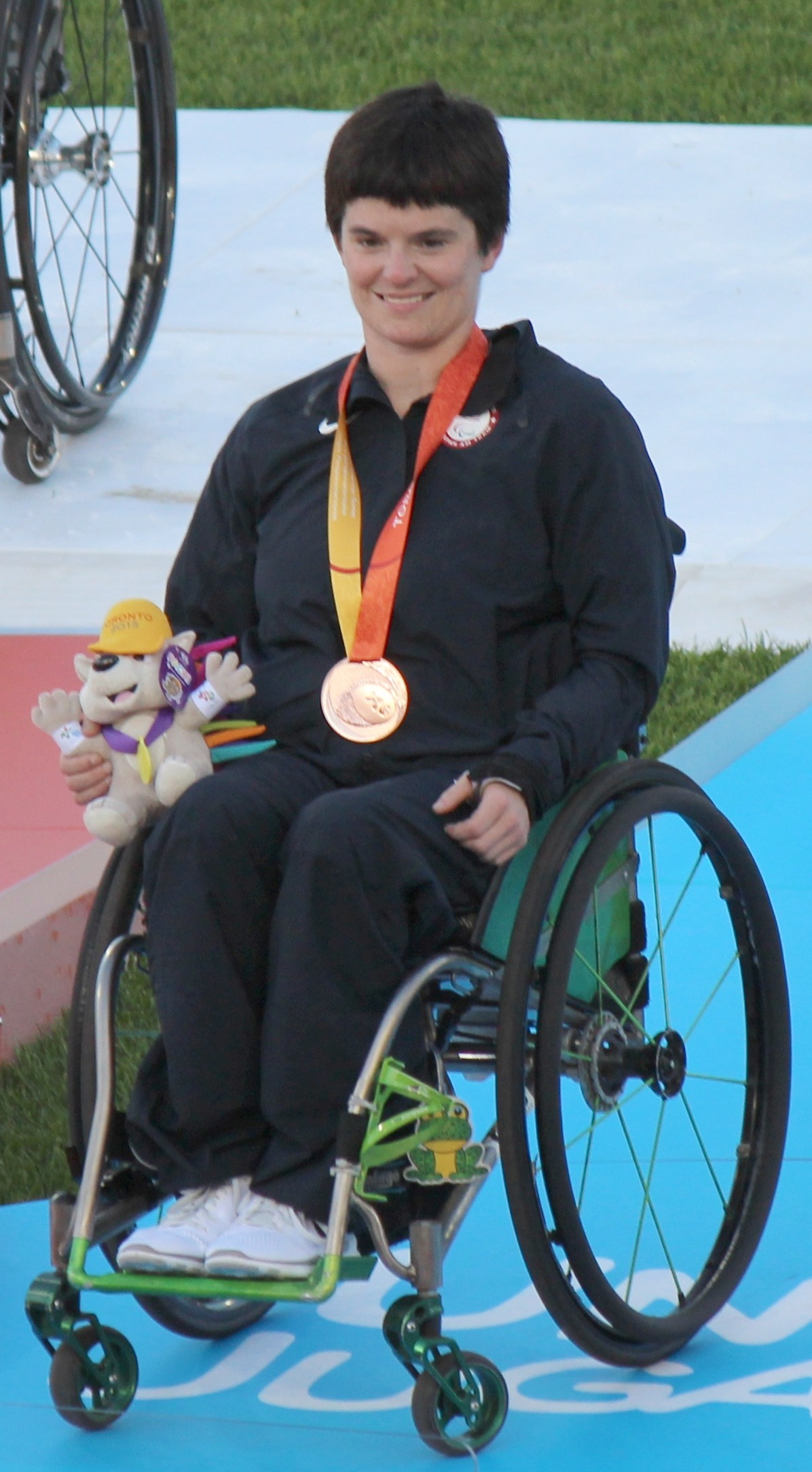
- Mitchell at the 2015 Parapan American Games
- Born: June 8, 1981 (age 45); Muskogee, Oklahoma, U.S.
- Education: Oklahoma State University; Emory; Georgia Tech
- Scientific career
- Fields: Chemical engineering Biomedical engineering
- Workplaces: Wallace H. Coulter Department of Biomedical Engineering
- Sports career
- Height: 5 ft 6 in (1.68 m)
- Weight: 121 lb (55 kg)
- Disability class: T51/F51
Medal record
Representing United States
Women's Para-athletics
Paralympic Games
Silver medal – second place	2016 Rio de Janeiro	Discus F51/52
Silver medal – second place	2020 Tokyo	Club throw F51
Bronze medal – third place	2016 Rio de Janeiro	Club throw F51
World Championships
Gold medal – first place	2013 Lyon	Discus F51/52
Gold medal – first place	2017 London	Discus throw F52
Silver medal – second place	2011 Christchurch	Discus F51/52
Silver medal – second place	2017 London	Club throw F51
Silver medal – second place	2023 Paris	Club throw F51
Parapan American Games
Silver medal – second place	2015 Toronto	Discus F51/52
Bronze medal – third place	2015 Toronto	100 m T52
Bronze medal – third place	2015 Toronto	Club throw F31/32/51
Women's Para-cycling
Road World Championships
Gold medal – first place	2011	H1 road race
Gold medal – first place	2011	H1 time trial
National Para-cycling Championships
Gold medal – first place	2010	H1 criterium
Gold medal – first place	2011	H1 time trial
Gold medal – first place	2011	H1 road race
Gold medal – first place	2011	H1 criterium
Gold medal – first place	2012	H1 time trial

Cassie Mitchell (born June 8, 1981) is an associate professor at Georgia Institute of Technology, American engineer, and Paralympic cyclist and track and field athlete.

== Early life ==
Mitchell was born in Muskogee, Oklahoma, and graduated from high school in Warner in 1999. Mitchell was valedictorian of her class, and received a track scholarship at the collegiate level. Shortly thereafter, she developed neuromyelitis optica, which left her paralyzed from the chest down with limited movement of her arms and hands and with permanent double vision. In 2004, she graduated from Oklahoma State University with a BS degree in chemical engineering. She later earned a PhD in biomedical engineering from both Emory and Georgia Tech universities.

== Academic career ==
Currently, she is an associate professor at Wallace H. Coulter Department of Biomedical Engineering at Georgia Tech and Emory University. There she directs the Laboratory for Pathology as they research neurodegenerative diseases with the assistance of artificial intelligence. She is also the principal investigator for the Laboratory for Pathology Dynamics.

== Paralympic career ==
Mitchell has competed in 4 Paralympics (2012, 2016, 2020, and 2024). Mitchell won a silver medal at the 2011 IPC World Championships and the same year won five gold medals at the UCI World Para-cycling Championships and National Para-cycling Championships. In 2010, she won the national Para-cycling Championships for H1 criterium. She holds American and world records in multiple track and field events and medaled in discus throw and club throw at the 2016 Rio Paralympics. She placed fourth in the 100 m, 200 m and discus throw at the 2012 Paralympics. At the 2024 Paralympic Games in Paris, Mitchell competed in the F51 discus competition and placed fourth.
