= Takefumi Anryo =

Japanese Paralympic athlete

Medal record

Paralympic athletics

Representing Japan

Paralympic Games
Silver medal – second place	2000 Sydney	Club Throw - F51

Takefumi Anryo (安陵 武文, Anryō Takefumi) is a paralympic athlete from Japan competing mainly in category F51 club throwing events.

Anryo competed in both the 2000 and 2004 Summer Paralympics. In the 2000 event he competed in the discus and won a silver medal in the club throwing event. In the 2004 games he concentrated on the club throwing and finished sixth.
