= Jo Butterfield =

British parasport athlete

Jo Butterfield MBE
Personal information
- Full name: Joanna Butterfield
- Born: 19 March 1979 (age 47) Yorkshire, England

Sport
- Sport: Track and Field, Wheelchair Curling
- Events: Club throw, Discus
- Club: Forth Valley Flyers; Red Star
- Coached by: Sheila Swan

Achievements and titles
- Personal bests: Discus: 10.08m Club: 22.81m
Medal record
Track and field (athletics)
Representing Great Britain
Paralympic Games
Gold medal – first place	2016 Rio	Club throw – F51
IPC World Championships
Gold medal – first place	2015 Doha	Club throw – F51
Bronze medal – third place	2015 Doha	Discus throw – F52
Silver medal – second place	2019 Dubai	Club throw - F51
IPC European Championships
Gold medal – first place	2014 Swansea	Club throw – F51
Gold medal – first place	2016 Grosseto	Club throw – F31/32/51
Silver medal – second place	2018 Berlin	Club throw - F31/32/51
Wheelchair curling
World Wheelchair Championship
Bronze medal – third place	2023 Richmond	Mixed Team

Joanna Butterfield (born 19 March 1979) is a British parasport athlete who competes in wheelchair curling. She previously competed in the F51 club and discus throw, before switching sports in 2023. In 2014 Butterfield set a European record in the club while winning the event at the 2014 IPC Athletics European Championships. The following year she added the World title at the 2015 IPC Athletics World Championships in Qatar, securing a place at the 2016 Paralympic Games. She went on to set a World record in the Club throw event while winning Gold at the 2016 Paralympic Games in Rio.

== Personal life ==
Butterfield was born in Yorkshire, England in 1979, but later moved to Glasgow in Scotland. In 2011, she was diagnosed with a spinal tumor which resulted in her being paralysed below the chest. Butterfield married her wife in 2022.

== Sports career ==
During her rehabilitation at a spinal unit in Glasgow, Butterfield was introduced to the sport of wheelchair rugby. In early 2012 she joined the Caledonian Crushers, and later became their vice-captain.

In 2014 Butterfield was classified as a F51 disability athlete and began competing in regional meets in both the discus and club throw events. In August that year she was selected for the Great Britain team to compete at the 2014 IPC Athletics European Championships. There she competed in the F32/51 club throw, and set a new European record with a distance of 17.68m winning gold in all British podium alongside Josie Pearson and Gemma Prescott. That season she also competed at the SDS Championships in Perth and threw personal bests in both the discus (9.79m) and the club (19.50m), winning gold in both events.

The following year Butterfield travelled to Dubai to take part in the Fazaa International, the first IPC Grand Prix of the year. In the F32/33/51 discus she threw 8.87m to win the competition and beat the previous F51 European record by 27 centimetres. She also improved on her European record in the club with a throw of 19.69 which saw her take gold. In July Butterfield competed in her third IPC Grand Prix of the year, held at Olympic Park in London. A throw of 21.50 in the club not only gave her the title, but improved on her European title to take her within 40 cm of American Rachael Morrison's world record. Morrison was Butterfield's main rival when the two met at the 2015 IPC Athletics World Championships in Doha. In the club Butterfield threw 21.44 to set a championship record and push her American rival into silver medal place. But it was Morrison on top when they met a few days later in the T52 discus throw, with Butterfield coming third behind Morrison and Mexico's Leticia Ochoa Delgado. Though Butterfield's distance of 8.96m was a new European record for a F51 athlete.

Butterfield was appointed Member of the Order of the British Empire (MBE) in the 2017 New Year Honours for services to field athletics.

In June 2021 she was among the first dozen athletes chosen to represent the UK at the postponed 2020 Paralympics in Tokyo.

In August 2022 she transferred sports to Wheelchair Curling. In February 2023 she was selected for the Scotland team to compete at the 2023 Wheelchair Curling World Championships. There she competed in the mixed team event and winning a bronze medal.
