= Thekra Alkaabi =

United Arab Emirati para athlete (born 2001)

Personal information
- Born: 9 November 2001 (age 24)

Sport
- Country: United Arab Emirates
- Sport: Paralympic athletics
- Disability class: T32
Medal record
Women's para-athletics
Representing United Arab Emirates
World Championships
Gold medal – first place	2025 New Delhi	100 m T71

Thekra Alkaabi (born 9 November 2001) is a para athlete from the United Arab Emirates. She represented the United Arab Emirates at the 2024 Summer Paralympics.

== Career ==
Alkaabi represented the United Arab Emirates at the 2024 Summer Paralympics in the club throw F32 event.

She competed at the 2025 World Para Athletics Championships and won a gold medal in the 100 metres T71 event with a world record time of 19.89 seconds. Athletes in the T71 classification use a three-wheeled running frame, with a saddle, body support and no pedals.
