= Mounia Gasmi =

Algerian Paralympic athlete

Personal information
- Born: 2 May 1990 (age 36) Batna, Algeria
- Height: 156 cm (61 in)

Sport
- Country: Algeria
- Sport: Athletics
- Disability: Cerebral palsy
- Disability class: F32
- Events: shot put club throw
- Club: Aures Batna
Medal record
Women's para athletics
Representing Algeria
Paralympic Games
Silver medal – second place	2012 London	Club throw F31/32/51
Silver medal – second place	2016 Rio de Janeiro	Club throw F31/32
Bronze medal – third place	2020 Tokyo	Club throw F32
World Championships
Gold medal – first place	2017 London	Club throw - F32
Silver medal – second place	2013 Lyon	Shot put - F32-34
Silver medal – second place	2015 Doha	Shot put - F32
Silver medal – second place	2015 Doha	Club throw - F32

Mounia Gasmi (born 2 May 1990) is a Paralympian athlete from Algeria competing mainly in F32 classification throwing events.

Gasmi represented her country at the 2012 Summer Paralympics in London, entering both the F32-34 shot put and the F31/32/51 club throw events. She finished seventh in the shot put, but a best distance of 22.51 metres in the club throw saw her take the silver medal. As well as her Paralympic success Gasmi has qualified for four consecutive IPC World Championships winning one gold and three silver medals, two silvers in the shot put and a gold and silver in the club throw. Her distance of 25.07m at the 2017 World ParaAthletics Championships in London gave Gasmi her first World title.

She won the bronze medal in the women's club throw F32 event at the 2020 Summer Paralympics held in Tokyo, Japan.
