= 2017 World Para Athletics Championships =

Paralympic track and field event

- Host city: London, England United Kingdom
- Nations: 92
- Athletes: 1074
- Events: 213
- Dates: 14–23 July 2017
- Main venue: London Stadium

The 2017 World Para Athletics Championships were a Paralympic track and field meet organized by World Para Athletics, a subcommittee of the International Paralympic Committee. It was held at London Stadium in London from 14 to 23 July 2017. It was the 8th edition of the event, the first to be held after being renamed from IPC Athletics World Championship, and featured 213 medal events.

They preceded the 2017 IAAF World Championships also held in London, marking the first time that a single city hosted both the IAAF and IPC athletics championships in the same year; London previously hosted the 2012 Summer Olympics and Paralympics.

== Events ==
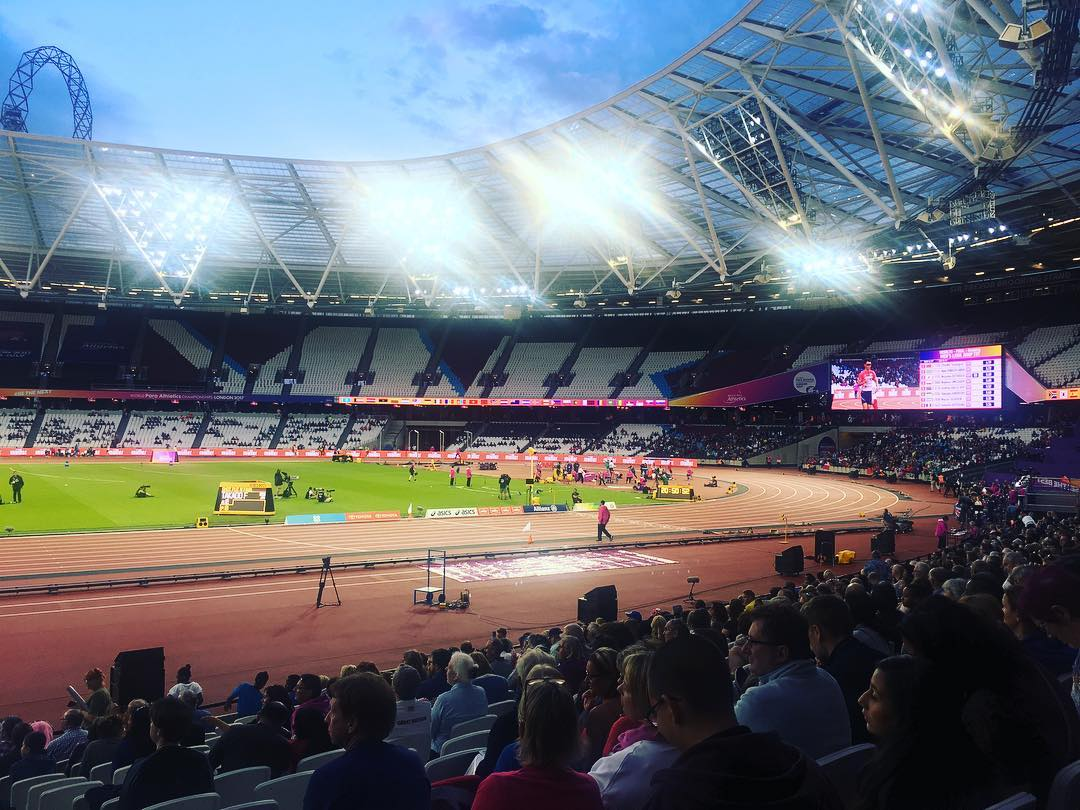
A view of the stadium during the evening session of 21 July

=== Classification ===
All athletes are classified according to their impairment and compete against athletes with similar impairments. Each classification consists of a three character code, starting with a letter and followed by a two-digit number. The letter specifies the event type: T for track and jumping events, and F for throwing events. The first digit of the number specifies the type of impairment and the second digit the severity of the impairment; the lower the second number, the more impaired.

- T/F11–13 are for athletes with visual impairments. Athletes in class 11 and some athletes in class 12 compete with a sighted guide.
- T/F20 is for athletes with intellectual impairments.
- T/F31–38 are for athletes with coordination impairments (e.g. cerebral palsy). Athletes in classes 31–34 compete sitting or in wheelchairs, while athletes in classes 35–38 compete standing
- T/F40–41 are for athletes of short stature.
- T/F42–47 are for athletes with limb impairments (e.g. amputations).
- T/F51–58 are for athletes with impaired muscle power or range of motion (e.g. paraplegia). Athletes in these classes compete seated or in wheelchairs.

Several events are open to athletes with lower classifications, for example T47 events are open to athletes classified T45, T46 and T47. However, as with the 2015 championships and 2016 Summer Paralympics, no weighting will be given to a lower classified athletes in these events.

== Participating nations ==
Below is the list of 1,074 athletes 92 countries who have agreed to participate in the Championships and the requested number of athlete places for each. Russia was found guilty of state-sponsored doping by the IPC in August 2016 and has been suspended from participating.

- Algeria (19)
- Angola (4)
- Argentina (16)
- Australia (37)
- Austria (5)
- Bahrain (2)
- Belarus (8)
- Belgium (5)
- Bermuda (1)
- Brazil (25)
- Bulgaria (9)
- Canada (24)
- Cape Verde (2)
- Chile (5)
- China (49)
- Chinese Taipei (3)
- Colombia (9)
- Costa Rica (2)
- Croatia (13)
- Cuba (6)
- Cyprus (2)
- Czech Republic (22)
- Denmark (7)
- Ecuador (10)
- Egypt (7)
- Estonia (1)
- Finland (7)
- France (23)
- Georgia (2)
- Germany (23)
- Ghana (3)
- Great Britain (50) (hosts)
- Greece (27)
- Hong Kong (5)
- Hungary (7)
- Iceland (1)
- Independent Paralympic Athletes (2)
- India (30)
- Iraq (10)
- Ireland (10)
- Iran (20)
- Italy (12)
- Jamaica (9)
- Japan (50)
- Jordan (3)
- Kazakhstan (4)
- Kenya (19)
- South Korea (6)
- Kuwait (12)
- Latvia (5)
- Libya (4)
- Lithuania (10)
- Luxembourg (1)
- Malaysia (6)
- Moldova (2)
- Mauritius (6)
- Mexico (21)
- Mongolia (2)
- Montenegro (3)
- Morocco (14)
- Namibia (5)
- Netherlands (11)
- New Zealand (6)
- Nicaragua (3)
- Norway (3)
- Oman (2)
- Philippines (5)
- Poland (50)
- Portugal (18)
- Qatar (6)
- Romania (5)
- Saudi Arabia (3)
- Senegal (1)
- Serbia (6)
- Singapore (3)
- Slovakia (5)
- Slovenia (2)
- South Africa (21)
- Spain (30)
- Sri Lanka (3)
- Sweden (12)
- Switzerland (8)
- Thailand (15)
- Trinidad and Tobago (4)
- Tunisia (16)
- Turkey (27)
- Uganda (1)
- Ukraine (27)
- United Arab Emirates (16)
- United States (50)
- Uzbekistan (7)
- Vietnam (1)

== Schedule ==
All dates are British Summer Time (UTC+1)

Date →		14 Fri	15 Sat	16 Sun	17 Mon	18 Tue	19 Wed	20 Thu	21 Fri	22 Sat	23 Sun
100 m	Men; Details	T54	T11; T12; T33; T34; T47	T13; T44	T42			T37	T38; T51	T36; T52	T35; T53
100 m	Women; Details	T34		T42	T13; T44	T11; T47	T12; T35	T36		T37; T38	T53; T54
200 m	Men; Details		T42	T53	T36	T13; T37; T38; T54	T35		T11; T12; T34	T43; T44; T47	
200 m	Women; Details		T37; T38; T47; T53; T54	T13; T35	T11	T36					T44
400 m	Men; Details			T44	T20; T34; T43; T44; T51	T11; T12; T52; T53	T47	T54	T13; T36	T38	T37
400 m	Women; Details				T54	T20	T53	T11; T34; T37	T38		T47
800 m	Men; Details			T38	~~T54~~			T34; T53	T54	T13; T20	T36
800 m	Women; Details				T34		T54			T11	T20; T53
1500 m	Men; Details		T46	T20; T52; T54		T13		T11	T37; T38		T47
1500 m	Women; Details	T13		T11; T20; T54							
5000 m	Men; Details		T11	T13							T20; T54
5000 m	Women; Details									T54	
4×100 m relay	Men; Details										T11-13; T42-47
4×400 m relay	Men; Details						T53/54				
4×400 m relay	Women; Details						T53/54				
High jump	Men; Details			T47		T13				T42; T44	
Long jump	Men; Details		T38	T11; T12; T20	T44	T36; T42	T47		T37	T13	
Long jump	Women; Details		T44		T20; T38		T37	T11	T12		T42; T47
Triple jump	Men; Details				T47	T20					
Shot put	Men; Details	F38; F57	F20	F33; F34; F35	F36	F46		F40; F41; F55	F53	F12; F42	F32; F37; F44
Shot put	Women; Details		F32; F55		F34; F40	F20; F34	F41		F35; F44	F33; F36; F53	F12; F57
Discus throw	Men; Details		F37	F42; F44; F56	F11	F52			F34; F57	F12; F46	
Discus throw	Women; Details		F41; F52; F57			F11; F44		F38	F12; F55		
Javelin throw	Men; Details	F46	F55		F41	F44; F57	F13; F37			F38	F34; F54
Javelin throw	Women; Details		F46	F54	F13; F56	F11					F34
Club throw	Men; Details				F51			F32			
Club throw	Women; Details	F32; F51									

The results of the men's 800 m T54 race on Monday 17 July were nullified and the race rescheduled to Friday 21 July after three competitors crashed at the 600-metre mark.

== Marketing ==
=== Mascot ===
The mascots for the IAAF and IPC Championships were unveiled in April 2017, and chosen through a children's design contest organized by the BBC programme Blue Peter. The mascots represent "everyday" endangered species of the UK; the World Para Athletics Championships Championships mascot is an anthropomorphic bee named Whizbee.

== Broadcasting ==
Channel 4 served as domestic rightsholder. Sunset + Vine, who has previously produced Channel 4's Paralympics coverage, was named host broadcaster for the championships.

== Medal table ==
* Host nation (Great Britain)

Rank	Nation	Gold	Silver	Bronze	Total
1	China	30	17	18	65
2	United States	20	19	20	59
3	Great Britain*	18	8	13	39
4	Ukraine	12	6	11	29
5	Australia	11	9	8	28
6	Tunisia	10	6	8	24
7	Algeria	9	4	6	19
8	Germany	8	7	7	22
9	Brazil	8	7	6	21
10	South Africa	5	8	2	15
11	Morocco	5	1	1	7
12	Poland	4	10	14	28
13	Italy	4	4	2	10
14	Ireland	4	3	0	7
15	Canada	4	2	3	9
16	Cuba	4	1	0	5
16	Latvia	4	1	0	5
18	Iran	3	12	5	20
19	Uzbekistan	3	4	0	7
20	Switzerland	3	1	0	4
21	Japan	2	5	9	16
22	Greece	2	3	3	8
23	Finland	2	2	2	6
24	Malaysia	2	1	0	3
25	Serbia	2	0	1	3
25	Trinidad and Tobago	2	0	1	3
27	Belgium	2	0	0	2
27	Kenya	2	0	0	2
29	Portugal	1	5	4	10
30	Netherlands	1	5	1	7
31	Colombia	1	4	5	10
32	Mexico	1	4	4	9
33	Spain	1	3	7	11
34	Croatia	1	2	2	5
34	India	1	2	2	5
36	Bulgaria	1	1	2	4
37	Austria	1	1	1	3
38	Denmark	1	1	0	2
38	Iraq	1	1	0	2
38	Qatar	1	1	0	2
41	Hungary	1	0	1	2
41	Lithuania	1	0	1	2
43	Bahrain	1	0	0	1
43	Kuwait	1	0	0	1
43	Uganda	1	0	0	1
46	France	0	4	4	8
47	Thailand	0	3	4	7
48	Argentina	0	3	2	5
49	Ecuador	0	3	1	4
49	United Arab Emirates	0	3	1	4
51	Namibia	0	3	0	3
52	New Zealand	0	2	3	5
53	Egypt	0	1	3	4
54	Angola	0	1	1	2
54	Sweden	0	1	1	2
56	Chile	0	1	0	1
56	Iceland	0	1	0	1
56	Jamaica	0	1	0	1
56	Luxembourg	0	1	0	1
56	Oman	0	1	0	1
56	Slovakia	0	1	0	1
56	Sri Lanka	0	1	0	1
63	Turkey	0	0	3	3
64	Belarus	0	0	2	2
64	South Korea	0	0	2	2
66	Cyprus	0	0	1	1
Totals (66 entries)		202	202	198	602

== Placing table ==
Host nation (Great Britain)

Rank	Name (country)	Points
1	China	611
2	United States	561.5
3	Great Britain	414
4	Poland	324.5
5	Australia	311
6	Ukraine	280
7	Japan	275
8	Brazil	213.5
9	Tunisia	205
10	Germany	201
11	Algeria	189
12	South Africa	187
13	Spain	163
14	Iran	156
15	Canada	133
16	France	115.5
17	Morocco	115
18	Mexico	109
19	Greece	105
20	Colombia	99
Total (87 Nations)		210 Events

== Individual medallists ==
The following athletes won three or more medals, with at least two being gold:

Rank	Name (country)	Medals
1	Walid Ktila (TUN)	(gold) Men's 100 m T34; (gold) Men's 200 m T34; (gold) Men's 400 m T34; (gold) Men's 800 m T34
1	Brent Lakatos (CAN)	(gold) Men's 100 m T53; (gold) Men's 200 m T53; (gold) Men's 400 m T53; (gold) Men's 800 m T53
1	Tatyana McFadden (USA)	(gold) Women's 200 m T54; (gold) Women's 400 m T54; (gold) Women's 800 m T54; (gold) Women's 1500 m T54
4	Johannes Floors (GER)	(gold) Men's 200 m T43; (gold) Men's 400 m T43; (gold) Men's 4×100 m relay T42-47; (silver) Men's 100 m T44
5	Leilia Adzhametova (UKR)	(gold) Women's 100 m T13; (gold) Women's 200 m T13; (gold) Women's 400 m T13
5	Hannah Cockroft (GBR)	(gold) Women's 100 m T34; (gold) Women's 400 m T34; (gold) Women's 800 m T34
5	Diana Dadzite (LAT)	(gold) Women's shot put F55; (gold) Women's discus throw F55; (gold) Women's javelin throw F56
5	Marcel Hug (SUI)	(gold) Men's 800 m T54; (gold) Men's 1500 m T54; (gold) Men's 5000 m T54
5	James Turner (AUS)	(gold) Men's 200 m T36; (gold) Men's 400 m T36; (silver) Men's 800 m T36
10	Yassine Gharbi (TUN)	(gold) Men's 200 m T54; (gold) Men's 400 m T54; (silver) Men's 1500 m T54; (bronze) Men's 800 m T54
11	Michael Brannigan (USA)	(gold) Men's 800 m T20; (gold) Men's 1500 m T20; (silver) Men's 5000 m T20
11	Charl du Toit (RSA)	(gold) Men's 200 m T37; (gold) Men's 400 m T37; (silver) Men's 100 m T37
13	Samantha Kinghorn (GBR)	(gold) Women's 100 m T53; (gold) Women's 200 m T53; (bronze) Women's 400 m T53
13	Zhou Hongzhuan (CHN)	(gold) Women's 400 m T53; (gold) Women's 800 m T53; (bronze) Women's 100 m T53

== World Records ==
Below is a list of all world records broken during the championships.

Event	Round	Name	Nation	Time/Distance	Date
Men's Shot Put F38	Final	Cameron Crombie	Australia	15.95 m	14 July
Women's 100m T34	Final	Hannah Cockroft	(United Kingdom) Great Britain	17.18	14 July
Men's Shot Put F20	Final	Muhammad Ziyad Zolkefli	Malaysia	17.29 m	15 July
Women's Discus Throw F52	Final	Cassie Mitchell	United States	13.23 m	15 July
Women's Javelin Throw F46	Final	Hollie Arnold	(United Kingdom) Great Britain	43.02 m	15 July
Men's 100m T47	Final	Petrucio Ferreira dos Santos	Brazil	10.53	15 July
Women's 200m T38	Final	Sophie Hahn	(United Kingdom) Great Britain	26.11	15 July
Women's 200m T53	Final	Samantha Kinghorn	(United Kingdom) Great Britain	28.61	15 July
Men's 200m T36	Qualifying Heat	James Turner	Australia	24.15	16 July
Men's 5000m T13	Final	Youssef Benibrahim	Morocco	14:20.69	16 July
Men's Club Throw F51	Final	Željko Dimitrijević	Serbia	31.99 m	16 July
Women's 100m T44	Qualifying Heat	Sophie Kamlish	(United Kingdom) Great Britain	12.90	17 July
Women's Javelin Throw F56	Final	Diāna Dadzīte	Latvia	27.07 m	17 July
Men's 200m T36	Final	James Turner	Australia	24.09	17 July
Men's Javelin Throw F40	Final	Ahmed Naas†	Iraq	38.90	17 July
Men's Long Jump T43	Final	Ioannis Sevdikalis	Greece	6,21	17 July
Men's Discus Throw F52	Final	Andre Rocha	Brazil	23.80 m	18 July
Men's Triple Jump T20	Final	Dmytro Prudnikov	Ukraine	15.50 m	18 July
Men's Javelin Throw F43	Final	Akeem Stewart	Trinidad and Tobago	57.61 m	18 July
Men's High Jump T13	Final	Isaac Jean-Paul	United States	2.17 m	18 July
Women's 400m T20	Final	Breanna Clark	United States	56.33	18 July
Women's 100m T35	Final	Isis Holt	Australia	13.43	19 July
Men's Javelin Throw F13	Final	Aleksandr Svechnikov	Uzbekistan	71.01 m	19 July
Men's Shot Put F55	Final	Ruzhdi Ruzhdi	Bulgaria	12.47 m	20 July
Women's 400m T37	Final	Georgina Hermitage	(United Kingdom) Great Britain	1:00.29	20 July
Men's Shot Put F41	Final	Niko Kappel	Germany	13.81 m	20 July
Women's 100m T36	Final	Shi Yiting	China	13.68	20 July
Men's 400m T13	Final	Mohamed Amguoun	Morocco	46.92	21 July
Men's Javelin Throw F38	Final	Jayden Sawyer	Australia	52.96 m	22 July
Men's 200m T47	Final	Petrucio Ferreira dos Santos	Brazil	21.21	22 July
Women's 100m T38	Final	Sophie Hahn	(United Kingdom) Great Britain	12.44	22 July
Men's Shot Put F42	Final	Aled Davies	(United Kingdom) Great Britain	17.52 m	22 July
Men's Shot Put F43	Final	Akeem Stewart	Trinidad and Tobago	19.08 m	23 July
Men's Shot Put F32	Final	Lahouari Bahlaz	Algeria	11.08 m	23 July

† Naas set a world record competing in the F41 men's javelin, though his throw left him in fifth place overall.
