= T51 (classification) =

Para-athletics classification

T51 is disability sport classification for athletics. The class includes people with a number of different types of disabilities including spinal cord injuries and cerebral palsy. Similar classifications are T52, T53, T54 and T55. It is for sportspeople with minimal upper body function who use a wheelchair, spinal cord injury class F1 and Les Autres class LAF1.

People in this class compete in wheelchair racing events.

== Definition ==
Functional mobility range for a T51 classified competitor

This classification is for disability athletics. This classification is one of several classifications for athletes with spinal cord injuries. Similar classifications are T52, T53 and T54 Jane Buckley, writing for the Sporting Wheelies, describes the athletes in this classification as: "Wheelchair athlete who has mild weakness in shoulders, limited ability in straightening elbows and wrist function. No finger, trunk or leg function."

The International Paralympic Committee described this classification on their website in July 2016 as follows: "Athletes usually have decreased shoulder muscle power and difficulty straightening the elbows for a pushing action required for wheelchair racing propulsion. There is no muscle power in the trunk. Wheelchair propulsion is achieved with a pulling action using the elbow flexor and wrist extensor muscles". They defined this technically in 2011 as "These athletes will usually have elbow flexion and wrist dorsiflexion muscle power to grade 5, a decrease of shoulder muscle power especially pectoralis major, and triceps muscle power from grade 0-3. Use elbow flexors and wrist dorsiflexors for propulsion. Sit in an upright position with knees under the chin. Have large push rims. Equivalent activity limitation to person with complete cord injury at cord level C5-6."

== Performance and rules ==
Wheelchairs used by this class have three wheels, with a maximum rear height of 70 centimetres (28 in) and maximum front height of 50 centimetres (20 in). Chairs cannot have mirrors or any gears. They are not allowed to have anything protruding from the back of the chair. As opposed to wearing hip numbers, racers in this class wear them on the helmet. Instead of wearing bibs, these numbers are put on the back of the racing chair and the racer.

=== Starting commands ===
"On your marks" is used to indicate that the athlete should approach or be at the starting line. "Set" means the athlete should take their final starting position. At this time, the front wheel should be touching the ground behind the starting line. At this stage, no further movement is allowed until the starting gun is fired or a "Go" command is given.

=== Racing ===
Because this is a wheelchair class, different rules apply for overtaking with the responsibility lying with the racer coming from behind. They must be completely clear of the front wheel of the racer they are overtaking before cutting in front of them. The racer being overtaken cannot deliberately obstruct or impede the racer doing the overtaking. If a crash occurs within the first 50 meters of a race that is 800 meters or longer, the starting official has the option of recalling the race. In races in the United States, a race official's job for a crash is only to direct other racers around the accident 30 meters ahead of the accident.

In relay events involving this class, each team has two lanes. Racers don't use a baton, but instead transfer via touch of the body in the exchange zone. The incoming racer cannot use their momentum to push and give the ongoing racer any acceleration. The acceleration zone and take-over zone both are 20 meters.

In wheelchair races, the winner and time is determined by when the center of the front axle goes across the finish line.

== Events ==
Relay events available to this class internationally include the 4 x 100 meters and the 4 x 400 meters. Junior relays in the United States include the 4 x 100 meters, the 4 x 400 meters, and the 800 meter medley of 100, 100, 200 and 400 meters.

== History ==
The classification was created by the International Paralympic Committee and has roots in a 2003 attempt to address "the overall objective to support and co-ordinate the ongoing development of accurate, reliable, consistent and credible sport focused classification systems and their implementation."

For the 2016 Summer Paralympics in Rio, the International Paralympic Committee had a zero classification at the Games policy. This policy was put into place in 2014, with the goal of avoiding last minute changes in classes that would negatively impact athlete training preparations. All competitors needed to be internationally classified with their classification status confirmed prior to the Games, with exceptions to this policy being dealt with on a case-by-case basis. In case there was a need for classification or reclassification at the Games despite best efforts otherwise, athletics classification was scheduled for September 4 and September 5 at Olympic Stadium. For sportspeople with physical or intellectual disabilities going through classification or reclassification in Rio, their in competition observation event is their first appearance in competition at the Games.

== World records ==
In the 100m event, the men's world record is held by Toni Piispanen and the women's world record is held by Cassie Mitchell.

== Becoming classified ==
Athletes who wish to compete in para-athletics must first have a classification evaluation. During this, they both undergo a medical assessment and are asked to demonstrate skills in athletics, such as pushing a racing wheelchair and throwing. A determination is then made as to what classification an athlete should compete in. Classifications may be Confirmed or Review status. For athletes who do not have access to a full classification panel, Provisional classification is available; this is a temporary Review classification, considered an indication of class only, and generally used only in lower levels of competition.
