= Club throw =

Track and field throwing event for disability athletes

The club throw is an throwing parasport where the objective is to throw a wooden club. The event is one of the four throwing events, along with discus, javelin and shot put of the Summer Paralympics. It is the Paralympic equivalent of the hammer throw. The club throw was introduced for both men and women at the first 1960 Summer Paralympic Games. It was dropped from the women's programme from the 1992 Paralympics in Barcelona but was reinstated for London 2012.

== Sport rules ==
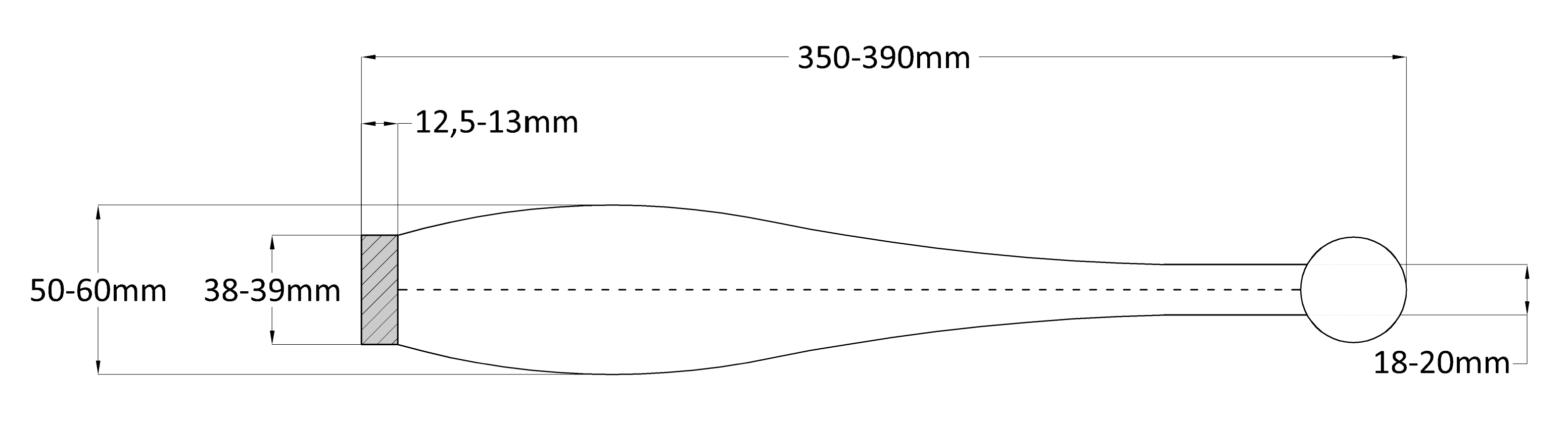
The club

Like other throwing events, the competition is decided by who can throw the club the farthest, though when the event is contested by athletes of different disability classifications, such as the Paralympics, the result is decided by a points score using the Raza Points System which considers athletes' relative levels of disability. The club for men and women weighs a minimum of 397 grams (14.0 oz) and is normally made from wood with a metal base. The athlete sits in a frame in a throwing area which is within a marked circle between 2.135 and 2.50 metres (7 ft 0 in and 8 ft 2 in) in diameter. The frame is common for each competitor and is rigid. The sport is contested at the Paralympics by athletes in the F31, F32 and F51 classes (individuals with the most significant impairment in hand function).

== Records ==
As of 2017 the world record for the men's club in the 32 class is held by Maciej Sochal, who threw 37.19 metres (122 ft 0 in) at the 2016 IPC Athletics European Championships. The men's record in the 51 class is held by Željko Dimitrijević, who recorded a distance of 31.99 metres (104 ft 11 in) at the 2017 World Para Athletics Championships.

As of 2017 the world record for the women's club in the 32 class is held by Maroua Ibrahmi, who threw 26.93 metres (88 ft 4 in) at the 2016 Summer Paralympics. The women's record in the 51 class is held by America's Rachael Morrison, who recorded a distance of 23.82 metres (78 ft 2 in) in Claremont, CA on 8 April 2017.

=== Paralympics ===
==== Men ====
Games	Location	Open to	Gold	Class	Distance (points)	Silver	Class	Distance (points)	Bronze	Class	Distance (points)
1984	New York, United States	1A	Bart Dodson (USA)	1A	23.54	Franicsco de las Fuentes (MEX)	1A	21.44	S. Wilkins (USA)	1A	21.12
1988	Seoul, South Korea	1A	Edund Weber (FRG)	1A	23.44	Jose Danile Haylan (ARG)	1A	18.28	Paolo D'Agostini (ITA)	1A	17.50
1992	Barcelona, Spain	C6	Dae Kwan Kim (KOR)	C6	51.58 WR	Keith Gardner (GBR)	C6	43.78	S. Da Costa Neto (BRA)	C6	43.50
1996	Atlanta, United States	F50	Stephen Miller (GBR)	F50	25.84 WR	James Richardson (GBR)	F50	22.75	Aaron Little (USA)	F50	20.65
2000	Sydney, Australia	F51	Stephen Miller (GBR)	F51	27.74	Takefumi Anryo (JPN)	F51	26.88	Ahmed Kamal (BRN)	F51	26.08
2004	Athens, Greece	F32/F51	Stephen Miller (GBR)	F32	33.53 (1133)	Radim Beles (CZE)	F51	25.44 (993)	Karim Betina (ALG)	F32	29.17 (986)
2008	Beijing, China	F32/F51	Mourad Idoudi (TUN)	F32	35.77 (1125) WR	Stephen Miller (GBR)	F32	34.37 (1081)	Jan Vanek (CZE)	F51	25.29 (1063)
2012	London, United Kingdom	F31/32/51	Željko Dimitrijević (SRB)	F51	26.88 (1010)	Radim Běleš (CZE)	F51	26.67 (1004)	Lahouari Bahlaz (ALG)	F32	36.31 (1003)
2016	Rio de Janeiro, Brazil	F32	Maciej Sochal (POL)	F32	33.91	Athanasios Konstantinidis (GRE)	F32	33.69	Stephen Miller (GBR)	F32	31.93
2016	Rio de Janeiro, Brazil	F51	Zeljko Dimitrijevic (SRB)	F51	29.96 WR	Milos Mitic (SRB)	F51	26.84	Marián Kuřeja (SVK)	F51	26.82
2020	Tokyo, Japan	F32	Liu Li (CHN)	F32	45.39 WR	Athanasios Konstantinidis (GRE)	F32	38.68	Walid Ferhah (ALG)	F32	35.34
2020	Tokyo, Japan	F51	Musa Taimazov (RPC)	F51	35.42 WR	Željko Dimitrijević (SRB)	F51	35.29	Marián Kuřeja (SVK)	F51	30.66

==== Women ====
Games	Location	Open to	Gold	Class	Distance (points)	Silver	Class	Distance (points)	Bronze	Class	Distance (points)
1960	Rome, Italy	A	Maria Scutti (ITA)	A	19.10	Anna Maria Galimberti (ITA)	A	17.82	Manette Berger-Waldenegg (AUT)	A	17.32
1960	Rome, Italy	B	Maria Scutti (ITA)	B	20.07	Marlene Muhlendyck (FRG)	B	19.42	Anna Maria Galimberti (ITA)	B	19.11
1960	Rome, Italy	C	Zander (FRG)	C	26.62	Daphne Ceeney (AUS)	C	21.11	Maria Scutti (ITA)	C	20.21
2012	London, United Kingdom	F31/32/51	Maroua Ibrahmi (TUN)	F32	23.43 WR	Mounia Gasmi (ALG)	F32	22.51	Gemma Prescott (GBR)	F32	20.50
2016	Rio de Janeiro, Brazil	F31/32	Maroua Ibrahmi (TUN)	F32	26.93 WR	Mounia Gasmi (ALG)	F32	25.41	Gemma Prescott (GBR)	F32	19.77
2016	Rio de Janeiro, Brazil	F51	Joanna Butterfield (GBR)	F51	22.81 WR	Zoia Ovsii (UKR)	F51	22.21	Cassie Mitchell (USA)	F51	21.84
2020	Tokyo, Japan	F32	Róża Kozakowska (POL)	F32	28.74 WR	Anastasiia Moskalenko (UKR)	F32	24.73	Mounia Gasmi (ALG)	F32	23.29

== See also ==
- Athletics at the Summer Paralympics
- Disability sport classification
