= T32 (classification) =

Para-athletics classification

T32 is disability sport classification for track events in disability athletics. This is a wheelchair racing class. The classification is one of three classes of wheelchair racing for people with athetosis, ataxia or hypertonia. The number of events available to people in this class has decreased since the 1980s, with no T32 events at the 2016 Summer Paralympics. While undergoing classification, T32 competitors both undergo a bench test of muscle coordination and demonstrate their skills in athletics.

== Definition ==
This classification is for disability athletics. Jane Buckley, writing for the Sporting Wheelies, describes the athletes in this classification as: "CP2 (Upper), see CP-ISRA classes (appendix) Wheelchair " The classification in the appendix by Buckley goes on to say "Athletes are able to propel a wheelchair but have very poor useful strength in their arms, legs and trunk." The Australian Paralympic Committee defines this classification as being for "Severe to moderate quadriplegia." The International Paralympic Committee defined this classification on their website in July 2016 as, "Coordination impairments (hypertonia, ataxia and athetosis)".

== Disability groups ==
Multiple types of disabilities are eligible to compete in this class. This class includes people who have cerebral palsy, or who have had a stroke or traumatic brain injury.

== Performance and rules ==
Wheelchairs used by this class have three wheels, with a maximum rear height of 70 centimetres (28 in) and maximum front height of 50 centimetres (20 in). Chairs cannot have mirrors or any gears. They are not allowed to have anything protruding from the back of the chair. Officials can check for this by placing the chair against a wall, where the rear wheels should touch it without obstruction. As opposed to wearing hip numbers, racers in this class wear them on the helmet. Instead of wearing bibs, these numbers are put on the back of the racing chair and the racer.

Because this is a wheelchair class, different rules apply for overtaking with the responsibility lying with the racer coming from behind. They must be completely clear of the front wheel of the racer they are overtaking before cutting in front of them. The racer being overtaken cannot deliberately obstruct or impede the racer doing the overtaking. If a crash occurs within the first 50 meters of a race that is 800 meters or longer, the starting official has the option of recalling the race. In races in the United States, a race official's job for a crash is only to direct other racers around the accident 30 meters ahead of the accident.

In wheelchair races, the winner and time is determined by when the center of the front axle goes across the finish line.

In relay events involve this class, each team has two lanes. Racers don't use a baton, but instead transfer via touch of the body in the exchange zone. The incoming racer cannot use their momentum to push and give the ongoing racer any acceleration. The acceleration zone is 20 meters, with the take over zone being 20 meters.

== History ==
The classification was created by the International Paralympic Committee and has roots in a 2003 attempt to address "the overall objective to support and co-ordinate the ongoing development of accurate, reliable, consistent and credible sport focused classification systems and their implementation."

== Events ==
Events that may be on the program for T32 competitors include the 4 x 100 meters and the 4 x 400 meters.

== Governance ==
Classification into this class is handled by the International Paralympic Committee. For national events, classification is handled by the national athletics organization.

== Becoming classified ==
Athletes with cerebral palsy or similar impairments who wish to compete in para-athletics competition must first undergo a classification assessment. During this, they both undergo a bench test of muscle coordination and demonstrate their skills in athletics, such as pushing a racing wheelchair and throwing. A determination is then made as to what classification an athlete should compete in. Classifications may be Confirmed or Review status. For athletes who do not have access to a full classification panel, Provisional classification is available; this is a temporary Review classification, considered an indication of class only, and generally used only in lower levels of competition.
