= Qatar at the Paralympics =

- IPC code: QAT
- NPC: Qatar Paralympic Committee
- Medals: Gold 0 Silver 2 Bronze 1 Total 3

Summer appearances
- 1996; 2000; 2004; 2008; 2012; 2016; 2020; 2024

Qatar made its Paralympic Games début at the 1996 Summer Paralympics in Atlanta, with a single representative (Salah Al Mulla) in powerlifting. The country has participated in every subsequent edition of the Summer Paralympics, but has never entered the Winter Paralympics. Qatar's delegations have only ever consisted in male athletes before 2016 Summer Paralympics, and have always been small, containing no more than three competitors. All Qatari athletes have competed in field events (javelin or shot put) or in powerlifting.

Qatar won its first medals in 2016 Summer Paralympics in both men and women's shot put. Qatar won a bronze medal in 2020 Summer Paralympics in men's shot put.

== Medalists ==
Medal	Name	Games	Sport	Event
Silver	Abdulrahman Abdulqadir Fiqi	(Brazil) 2016 Rio de Janeiro	Athletics	Men's shot put F34
Silver	Sara Hamdi Masoud	(Brazil) 2016 Rio de Janeiro	Athletics	Women's shot put F33
Bronze	Abdulrahman Abdulqadir Fiqi	(Japan) 2020 Tokyo	Athletics	Men's shot put F34

== See also ==
- Qatar at the Olympics
