= Ecuador at the 2024 Summer Paralympics =

- IPC code: ECU
- NPC: Ecuadorian Paralympic Sport Federation

in Paris, France August 28, 2024 – September 8, 2024
- Competitors: 14 (5 men & 9 women) in 4 sports
- Flag bearers: Jimmy Caicedo; Kiara Rodríguez
- Medals Ranked 47th: Gold 2 Silver 0 Bronze 3 Total 5

Summer Paralympics appearances (overview)
- 1976; 1980; 1984; 1988; 1992; 1996; 2000; 2004; 2008; 2012; 2016; 2020; 2024

Ecuador competed at the 2024 Summer Paralympics in Paris, France, from 28 August to 8 September.

== Medalists ==
Medal	Athlete/s	Sport	Event	Date
Gold	Kiara Rodríguez	Athletics	Women's 100 metres T47	3 September
Gold	Kiara Rodríguez	Athletics	Women's long jump T47	6 September
Bronze	Sixto Roman Moreta Criollo	Athletics	5000 m T13	31 August
Bronze	Poleth Méndes	Athletics	Women's shot put F20	1 September
Bronze	Estefany López	Athletics	Women's discus throw F41	4 September

== Competitors ==
The following is the list of number of competitors in the Games.

Sport	Men	Women	Total
Archery	0	1	1
Athletics	5	6	11
Boccia	0	1	1
Powerlifting	0	1	1
Total	5	9	14

== Archery ==
Athlete	Event	Ranking Round		Round of 32	Round of 16	Quarterfinals	Semifinals	Finals	
Athlete	Event	Score	Seed	Opposition Score	Opposition Score	Opposition Score	Opposition Score	Opposition Score	Rank
Diana Gonzabay	Women's individual compound	637	26	Paterson Pine (GBR) L 141–142	Did not advance				

== Athletics ==
Ecuadorian track and field athletes achieved quota places for the following events based on their results at the 2023 World Championships, 2024 World Championships, or through high performance allocation, as long as they meet the minimum entry standard (MES).

Key

- Note–Ranks given for track events are within the athlete's heat only
- Q = Qualified for the next round
- q = Qualified for the next round as a fastest loser or, in field events, by position without achieving the qualifying target
- DQ = Disqualified
- PR = Paralympic Record
- AR = Area (or continental) Record
- NR = National Record
- SB = Season's Best
- N/A = Round not applicable for the event
- Bye = Athlete not required to compete in round

Track and road events

Men

Athlete	Event	Heats		Final	
Athlete	Event	Result	Rank	Result	Rank
Jimmy Caicedo	1500 m T11	4:10.30	2 Q	4:10.79	5
Jimmy Caicedo	5000 m T11	—N/a		15:24.69	5
Darwin Castro	1500 m T11	4:18.57	4	Did not advance	
Darwin Castro	5000 m T11	—N/a		15:50.65	7
Sixto Moreta	5000 m T13	—N/a		16:06.79	3rd place, bronze medalist(s)
Sixto Moreta	Marathon T12	—N/a		2:27:59	6

Women

Athlete	Event	Heat		Final	
Athlete	Event	Time	Rank	Time	Rank
Kiara Rodríguez	100 m T47	12.18	1 Q	12.04	1st place, gold medalist(s)
Lizanshela Angulo	400 m T20	57.35	4 Q	57.90	6

Field Events

Men

Athlete	Event	Final	
Athlete	Event	Distance Height	Rank
Roberto Chalá	Long jump T20	6.92	8
Jordi Congo	Shot put F20	16.01	6

Women

Athlete	Event	Final	
Athlete	Event	Distance Height	Rank
Estefany López	Discus throw F41	30.89	3rd place, bronze medalist(s)
Estefany López	Shot put F41	8.07	9
Poleth Méndes	Shot put F20	14.31	3rd place, bronze medalist(s)
Anaís Méndez	Shot put F20	13.16	10
Grecely Padilla	Shot put F20	13.23	7
Kiara Rodríguez	Long jump T47	6.05 PR	1st place, gold medalist(s)

== Boccia ==
Athlete	Event	Pool matches			Quarterfinals	Semifinals	Final / BM	
Athlete	Event	Opposition Score	Opposition Score	Rank	Opposition Score	Opposition Score	Opposition Score	Rank
Joselyn León	Women's individual BC2	Taggart (GBR); L 1–10	Gonçalves (POR); L 1–3	3	Did not advance			11

== Powerlifting ==
Athlete	Event	Attempts (kg)				Result (kg)	Rank
Athlete	Event	1	2	3	4	Result (kg)	Rank
Maylin Lescano	Women's 41 kg	~~104~~	~~104~~	~~104~~	—N/a	NM	DNF

== See also ==
- Ecuador at the 2024 Summer Olympics
- Ecuador at the Paralympics
