= Athletics at the 2016 Summer Paralympics – Women's shot put =

The Women's Shot Put athletics events for the 2016 Summer Paralympics took place at the Rio Olympic Stadium from September 8 to September 17, 2016. A total of 14 events are contested incorporating 17 different classifications.

Three competitors won a medal for their country for the first time at the Summer Paralympics. Fatema Nedham, representing Bahrain, Sara Al Senaani, representing United Arab Emirates, and Sara Hamdi Masoud, representing Qatar, became the first female athletes to win a medal for their country in this event.

== Schedule ==
Event↓/Date →	Thu 8	Fri 9	Sat 10	Sun 11	Mon 12	Tue 13	Wed 14	Thu 15	Fri 16	Sat 17
F12 Shot Put							F			
F20 Shot Put			F							
F32 Shot Put										F
F33 Shot Put									F	
F34 Shot Put							F			
F35 Shot Put								F		
F36 Shot Put										F
F37 Shot Put						F				
F40 Shot Put				F						
F41 Shot Put		F								
F53 Shot Put					F					
F54 Shot Put			F							
F57 Shot Put	F									

== Medal summary ==
Classification	Gold		Silver		Bronze	
F12 (inc F11)	Assunta Legnante; Italy	15.74 SB	Safiya Burkhanova; Uzbekistan	15.05 WR	Rebeca Valenzuela Alvarez; Mexico	13.05 RR
F20	Ewa Durska; Poland	13.94 WR	Anastasiia Mysnyk; Ukraine	13.24 PB	Sabrina Fortune; Great Britain	12.94 PB
F32	Maroua Brahmi; Tunisia	5.76	Noura Alktebi; United Arab Emirates	4.70 RR	Louise Ellery; Australia	4.19
F33	Asmahan Boudjadar; Algeria	5.72 RR	Sara Hamdi Masoud; Qatar	5.39 RR	Sara Al Senaani; United Arab Emirates	5.09 PB
F34	Zou Lijuan; China	8.75 WR	Lucyna Kornobys; Poland	8.00	Jessica Hamill; New Zealand	7.54
F35	Wang Jun; China	13.91 WR	Mariia Pomazan; Ukraine	13.59 RR	Marivana Oliveira; Brazil	9.28 RR
F36	Birgit Kober; Germany	11.41 PR	Wu Qing; China	10.33 SB	Kath Proudfoot; Australia	9.70
F37	Franziska Liebhardt; Germany	13.96 WR	Mi Na; China	13.73 RR	Eva Berná; Czech Republic	11.23
F40	Lauritta Onye; Nigeria	8.40 WR	Rima Abdelli; Tunisia	7.37 PB	Lara Baars; Netherlands	7.12
F41	Raoua Tlili; Tunisia	10.19 SB	Samar Ben Koelleb; Tunisia	8.39 PB	Claire Keefer; Australia	8.16
F53	Fatema Nedham; Bahrain	4.76	Deepa Malik; India	4.61 PB	Dimitra Korokida; Greece	4.28 SB
F54	Yang Liwan; China	7.99 PR	Hania Aidi; Tunisia	6.86	Fadhila Nafati; Tunisia	6.38
F57 (inc. F56)	Angeles Ortiz Hernandez; Mexico	10.94 SB	Nassima Saifi; Algeria	10.77	Nadia Medjemedj; Algeria	9.92 WR

== Results ==
=== F12 (incorporating F11) ===
Competed 14 September 2016 at 10:15.

Rank	Athlete	Nationality	Class	1	2	3	4	5	6	Best	Notes
1st place, gold medalist(s)	Assunta Legnante	Italy	F11	15.30	14.61	15.09	15.54	14.97	15.74	15.74	SB
2nd place, silver medalist(s)	Safiya Burkhanova	Uzbekistan	F12	14.87	14.72	14.82	15.05	X	14.97	15.05	WR
3rd place, bronze medalist(s)	Rebeca Valenzuela Alvarez	Mexico	F12	12.81	12.72	13.05	X	12.75	X	13.05	RR
4	Orysia Ilchyna	Ukraine	F12	X	11.74	12.46	12.98	12.40	12.83	12.98	PB
5	Zhao Yuping	China	F12	10.71	11.90	12.17	12.01	12.19	11.91	12.19	SB
6	Tamara Sivakova	Belarus	F12	11.10	11.19	10.91	11.03	11.10	11.24	11.24	
7	Zhang Liangmin	China	F11	10.40	10.59	11.12	10.48	10.82	X	11.12	SB
8	Rose Wélépa	France	F12	10.58	10.26	11.01	10.42	10.45	10.78	11.01	
9	Tang Hongxia	China	F11	10.94	10.86	10.60	-	-	-	10.94	
10	Liu Ya-Ting	Chinese Taipei	F12	10.32	9.59	10.04	-	-	-	10.04	
11	Izabela Campos	Brazil	F11	9.86	10.11	X	-	-	-	10.11	
12	Ana Talakai	Tonga	F11	7.21	7.44	X	-	-	-	7.44	PB

=== F20 ===
Competed 10 September 2016 at 15:38.

Rank	Athlete	Nationality	1	2	3	4	5	6	Best	Notes
1st place, gold medalist(s)	Ewa Durska	Poland	13.42	13.26	13.28	13.54	13.94	13.29	13.94	WR
2nd place, silver medalist(s)	Anastasiia Mysnyk	Ukraine	12.65	12.91	13.24	12.87	12.72	12.74	13.24	PB
3rd place, bronze medalist(s)	Sabrina Fortune	Great Britain	12.33	12.19	12.00	X	X	12.94	12.94	PB
4	Valasia Kyrgiovanaki	Greece	11.39	12.11	11.83	11.71	11.70	12.07	12.11	SB
5	Poleth Isamar Mendes Sanchez	Ecuador	10.97	11.47	11.38	11.78	11.96	12.02	12.02	RR
6	Inês Fernandes	Portugal	11.15	11.52	11.69	11.63	11.46	11.40	11.69	
7	Nicole Harris	Australia	11.44	X	X	X	X	11.53	11.53	
8	Sirly Tiik	Estonia	10.72	11.09	11.37	11.39	11.02	X	11.39	SB
9	Zoi Mantoudi	Greece	10.88	11.31	10.81	-	-	-	11.31	
10	Gloria Agblemagnon	France	10.85	10.48	10.42	-	-	-	10.85	
11	Mihriban Kaya	Turkey	9.40	10.16	9.89	-	-	-	10.16	

=== F32 ===
Competed 17 September 2016 at 17:33.

Rank	Athlete	Nationality	1	2	3	4	5	6	Best	Notes
1st place, gold medalist(s)	Maroua Brahmi	Tunisia	5.76	X	5.62	5.44	5.15	5.75	5.76	
2nd place, silver medalist(s)	Noura Alktebi	United Arab Emirates	4.13	3.77	4.70	3.73	4.55	4.60	4.70	RR
3rd place, bronze medalist(s)	Louise Ellery	Australia	X	X	3.59	X	4.19	X	4.19	
4	Mounia Gasmi	Algeria	X	X	X	3.99	X	X	3.99	
5	July Catalina Moreno Acosta	Colombia	3.25	X	X	3.49	X	X	3.49	
6	Krisztina Kálmán	Hungary	X	X	X	X	X	2.14	2.14	
	Saida Nayli	Tunisia	X	X	X	X	X	X	NM	

=== F33 ===
Competed 16 September 2016 at 17:33.

Rank	Athlete	Nationality	1	2	3	4	5	6	Best	Notes
1st place, gold medalist(s)	Asmahan Boudjadar	Algeria	5.54	X	5.72	5.44	4.89	5.14	5.72	RR
2nd place, silver medalist(s)	Sara Masoud	Qatar	5.39	5.34	5.30	4.91	5.25	5.18	5.39	RR
3rd place, bronze medalist(s)	Sara Alsenaani	United Arab Emirates	4.61	X	4.99	4.93	X	5.09	5.09	PB
4	Brydee Moore	Australia	4.87	5.08	4.79	4.79	4.60	4.94	5.08	
5	Anthi Liagkou	Greece	X	4.69	X	4.28	4.47	X	4.69	
6	Batoul Jahangiri	Iran	4.53	4.57	4.29	X	4.23	4.13	4.57	
7	Luisa Lizbeth Castrejon Lopez	Mexico	4.00	4.57	4.06	4.26	4.07	4.01	4.26	

=== F34 ===
Competed 14 September 2016 at 17:30.

Rank	Athlete	Nationality	1	2	3	4	5	6	Best	Notes
1st place, gold medalist(s)	Zou Lijuan	China	8.75	8.50	8.48	7.95	7.86	7.86	8.75	WR
2nd place, silver medalist(s)	Lucyna Kornobys	Poland	7.81	8.00	7.96	7.47	7.51	7.68	8.00	
3rd place, bronze medalist(s)	Jessica Hamill	New Zealand	7.54	X	7.38	7.22	7.12	7.04	7.54	
4	Saida Amoudi	Morocco	7.28	7.15	7.46	7.35	7.52	6.69	7.52	RR
5	Vanessa Daobry	Great Britain	7.20	7.27	X	7.23	6.96	7.06	7.27	
6	Frances Herrmann	Germany	6.60	6.64	6.53	6.42	6.32	6.37	6.64	
7	Marjaana Heikkinen	Finland	6.26	6.21	5.90	6.05	6.04	X	6.26	
8	Zandile Emily Nhlapo	South Africa	X	X	X	X	X	5.83	5.83	

=== F35 ===
Competed 15 September 2016 at 17:58.

Rank	Athlete	Nationality	1	2	3	4	5	6	Best	Notes
1st place, gold medalist(s)	Wang Jun	China	X	13.91	13.77	X	13.33	13.69	13.91	WR
2nd place, silver medalist(s)	Mariia Pomazan	Ukraine	12.65	13.59	13.55	X	X	13.11	13.59	RR
3rd place, bronze medalist(s)	Marivana Oliveira	Brazil	8.77	8.84	9.28	8.61	8.92	9.20	9.28	RR
4	Chenelle van Zyl	South Africa	8.28	8.49	7.99	7.76	7.66	X	8.49	
5	Anna Luxová	Czech Republic	8.01	7.77	X	7.82	8.20	7.98	8.20	
6	Dilafruzkhon Akhmatkhonova	Uzbekistan	X	X	X	7.87	X	X	7.87	

=== F36 ===
Competed 17 September 2016 at 10:52.

Rank	Athlete	Nationality	1	2	3	4	5	6	Best	Notes
1st place, gold medalist(s)	Birgit Kober	Germany	10.84	11.29	11.35	11.13	11.28	11.41	11.41	PR
2nd place, silver medalist(s)	Wu Qing	China	10.33	10.17	9.49	9.77	10.15	10.23	10.33	SB
3rd place, bronze medalist(s)	Kath Proudfoot	Australia	9.57	X	9.11	9.55	9.51	9.70	9.70	
4	Juliane Mogge	Germany	8.45	8.71	9.09	X	8.92	9.12	9.12	
5	Martha Liliana Hernández Florián	Colombia	X	8.15	7.97	7.69	8.01	8.15	8.15	

=== F37 ===
Competed 13 September 2016 at 18:10.

Rank	Athlete	Nationality	1	2	3	4	5	6	Best	Notes
1st place, gold medalist(s)	Franziska Liebhardt	Germany	13.96	X	X	13.30	12.53	13.56	13.96	WR
2nd place, silver medalist(s)	Mi Na	China	13.12	13.73	X	12.65	12.30	12.98	13.73	RR
3rd place, bronze medalist(s)	Eva Berna	Czech Republic	10.29	X	11.10	10.86	11.10	11.23	11.23	
4	Shirlene Coelho	Brazil	9.85	10.18	10.45	10.70	10.45	10.91	10.91	RR
5	Jia Qianqian	China	9.43	9.55	9.37	9.85	9.38	9.37	9.85	SB
6	Yomaira Cohen	Venezuela	9.05	9.33	9.53	9.54	9.52	8.96	9.54	
7	Taiga Kantāne	Latvia	8.49	8.13	8.60	X	7.80	8.78	8.78	

=== F40 ===
Competed 11 September 2016 at 23:16.

Rank	Athlete	Nationality	1	2	3	4	5	6	Best	Notes
1st place, gold medalist(s)	Lauritta Onye	Nigeria	7.83	7.54	7.55	8.40	8.14	7.33	8.40	WR
2nd place, silver medalist(s)	Rima Abdelli	Tunisia	7.27	7.37	7.37	7.25	7.35	6.83	7.37	PB
3rd place, bronze medalist(s)	Lara Baars	Netherlands	6.52	6.59	6.33	6.41	6.51	7.12	7.12	AR
4	Fengju Zhang	China	6.76	7.00	6.97	x	6.21	7.06	7.06	
5	Raja Jebali	Tunisia	6.80	6.70	6.99	6.62	6.99	6.77	6.99	
6	Renata Śliwińska	Poland	6.64	5.58	x	6.16	5.96	6.15	6.64	PB
7	Hasnaa Moubal	Morocco	5.97	6.16	5.97	5.97	5.87	6.07	6.16	
8	Sebehe Clarisse Lago	Ivory Coast	4.91	5.07	5.25	4.93	4.84	4.80	5.25	PB
9	Emily Frederick	United States	4.19	4.54	4.81				4.81	
10	Oxana Spataru	Moldova	4.02	3.93	3.88				4.02	PB

=== F41 ===
Competed 9 September 2016 at 15:53.

Rank	Athlete	Nationality	1	2	3	4	5	6	Best	Notes
1st place, gold medalist(s)	Raoua Tlili	Tunisia							10.19	SB
2nd place, silver medalist(s)	Samar Ben Koelleb	Tunisia							8.39	PB
3rd place, bronze medalist(s)	Claire Keefer	Australia							8.16	
4	Youssra Karim	Morocco							8.16	PB
5	Kelly Cristina Peixoto	Brazil							7.94	
6	Fathia Amaimia	Tunisia							7.90	PB
7	Hayat El Garaa	Morocco							6.97	
8	Marijana Goranovic	Montenegro							6.57	
9	Karina Erika Loyola	Argentina				-	-	-	6.17	

=== F53 ===
Competed 12 September 2016 at 15:03.

Rank	Athlete	Nationality	1	2	3	4	5	6	Best	Notes
1st place, gold medalist(s)	Fatema Nedham	Bahrain							4.76	
2nd place, silver medalist(s)	Deepa Malik	India							4.61	PB
3rd place, bronze medalist(s)	Dimitra Korokida	Greece							4.28	SB
4	Pamela LeJean	Canada							4.16	
5	Deirdre Morgan	Ireland							4.04	
6	Svitlana Stetsiuk	Ukraine							3.48	
7	Estela Salas	Mexico							Did not start	

=== F54 ===
Competed 10 September 2016 at 15:05.

Rank	Athlete	Nationality	1	2	3	4	5	6	Best	Notes
1st place, gold medalist(s)	Yang Liwan	China							7.89	PR
2nd place, silver medalist(s)	Hania Aidi	Tunisia							6.86	
3rd place, bronze medalist(s)	Fadhila Nafati	Tunisia							6.38	
4	Gloria Zarza Guadarrama	Mexico							6.23	
5	Yanive Torres Martinez	Colombia							6.12	SB
6	Poliana Jesus	Brazil							5.70	
7	Dzenita Klico	Bosnia and Herzegovina							5.47	PB
8	Eva Kacanu	Czech Republic							5.23	

=== F57 (incorporating F56) ===
Competed 8 September 2016 at 22:33.

Rank	Athlete	Nationality	Class	1	2	3	4	5	6	Best	Notes
1st place, gold medalist(s)	Angeles Ortiz Hernandez	Mexico	T57							10.94	SB
2nd place, silver medalist(s)	Nassima Saifi	Algeria	T57							10.77	
3rd place, bronze medalist(s)	Nadia Medjemedj	Algeria	T56							9.92	WR
4	Eucharia Iyiazi	Nigeria	T57							9.31	SB
5	Tsogtgerel Gendendarjaa	Mongolia	T57							8.59	
6	Ivanka Koleva	Bulgaria	T57							8.42	
7	Roseane Santos	Brazil	T57							8.36	
8	Angela Madsen	United States	T56							8.35	SB
9	Martina Willing	Germany	T56				-	-	-	7.79	
10	Rosette Luyina Kiese	Democratic Republic of the Congo	T57				-	-	-	4.97	SB
11	Dague Diop	Senegal	T57				-	-	-	4.53	SB
12	Safia Djelal	Algeria	T57	x	x	x	-	-	-	NM	
