= Ecuador at the 2020 Summer Paralympics =

- IPC code: ECU
- NPC: Ecuadorian Paralympic Sport Federation

in Tokyo
- Competitors: 4 in 1 sports
- Flag bearer: Kiara Rodriguez & Darwin Castro
- Medals Ranked 56th: Gold 1 Silver 0 Bronze 2 Total 3

Summer Paralympics appearances (overview)
- 1976; 1980; 1984; 1988; 1992; 1996; 2000; 2004; 2008; 2012; 2016; 2020; 2024

Ecuador competed at the 2020 Summer Paralympics in Tokyo, Japan, from 24 August to 5 September 2021.

On 29 August 2021, the country won its first two Paralympic medals in its Paralympics history through Mendez sister Poleth Isamar Mendes Sanchez and Anaís Méndez

Poleth Isamar Mendes Sanchez won Ecuador's first Paralympic gold medal with a new world record of 14.39 in the women's F20 shot put event during the 2020 Summer Paralympics. Coincidentally, her sister Anaís Méndez also won bronze medal in the same discipline making it a rare instance of athletes coming from same family who go on to win medals in a same competition. Poleth Isamar Mendes Sanchez won Ecuador's first ever gold medal in Paralympics history while her younger sister Anaís Méndez won Ecuador's first ever bronze medal in Paralympics history. Prior to the 2020 Summer Paralympics, Ecuador had never won a Paralympic medal.

== Medalists ==
Medal	Name	Sport	Event	Date
Gold	Poleth Isamar Mendes Sanchez	Athletics	Women's shot put F20	29 August
Bronze	Anais Mendez	Athletics	Women's shot put F20	29 August
Bronze	Kiara Rodriguez	Athletics	Women's long jump T47	3 September

== Athletics ==
Four Ecuadorian athletes (Damian Josue Carcelen Delgado, Anderson Alexander Colorado Mina, Roberto Carlos Chala Espinoza & Kiara Rodriguez) successfully broke through the qualifications for the 2020 Paralympics after breaking the qualification limit.

DQ: Disqualified | SB: Season Best | Q: Qualified by place or standard based on overall position after heats | DNM: Did not mark | DNA: Did not advance | N/A: Not available, stage was not contested | PB: Personal Best | WR: World Record | PR: Paralympic Record | AR: Area Record

=== Track ===
Athlete	Event	Heats		Final	
Athlete	Event	Result	Rank	Result	Rank
Darwin Castro Guides: Diego Arévalo (1500 & 5000 metres), Sebastian Rosero (5000 metres)	1500 m T11	4:13.74	2 Q	4:10.24 PB	5
Darwin Castro Guides: Diego Arévalo (1500 & 5000 metres), Sebastian Rosero (5000 metres)	5000 m T11	N/A		15:49.60	6
Anderson Colorado	Men's 400m T20	48.89 SB	3 Q	48.58 SB	6
Damián Carcelen	Men's 400m T20	49.35 SB	3 Q	49.02 SB	8
Kiara Rodriguez	Women's 100m T47	12.54 PB	4 q	12.55	6

=== Field ===
Athlete	Event	Final	
Athlete	Event	Result	Rank
Roberto Chala	Men's long jump T20	7.16 AR	8
Jordi Congo	Men's shot put F20	DNS	
Damián Carcelen	Men's shot put F20	7.46 PR	10
Poleth Méndes	Women's shot put F20	14.39 WR	Gold medal
Anaís Méndez	Women's shot put F20	14.06 PB	Bronze medal
Kiara Rodriguez	Men's long jump T20	5.63 AR	Bronze medal

== See also ==
- Ecuador at the Paralympics
- Ecuador at the 2020 Summer Olympics
