= 2017 World Para Athletics Championships – Women's shot put =

The women's shot put at the 2017 World Para Athletics Championships was held at the Olympic Stadium in London from 14 to 23 July.

== Medalists ==
Event	Gold		Silver		Bronze	
F12	Assunta Legnante; Italy	15.82	Sofiya Burkhanova; Uzbekistan	14.76 CR	Rebeca Valenzuela Alvarez; Mexico	13.05 =AR
F20	Ewa Durska; Poland	13.18	Poleth Isamar Mendes Sanchez; Ecuador	12.72 AR	Zoi Mantoudi; Greece	12.60 PB
F32	Maroua Ibrahmi; Tunisia	5.86	Maria Stamatoula; Greece	5.85 SB	Anastasiia Moskalenko; Ukraine	5.38 PB
F33	Asmahane Boudjadar; Algeria	5.92 AR	Sara Hamdi Masoud; Qatar	5.39 =AR	Anthi Liagkou; Greece	5.22 SB
F34	Zou Lijuan; China	8.23 SB	Lucyna Kornobys; Poland	8.22 SB	Jessica Hamill; New Zealand	7.77 SB
F35	Mariia Pomazan; Ukraine	12.63	Wang Jun; China	12.24 SB	Klaudia Maliszewska; Poland	7.81 PB
F36	Wu Qing; China	9.69 SB	Juliane Mogge; Germany	9.44	Mariko Fujita; Japan	6.37 SB
F37	Mi Na; China	12.66 SB	Li Yingli; Tunisia	11.98 PB	Eva Berna; Czech Republic	11.24 SB
F40	Rima Abdelli; Tunisia	7.57 PB	Renata Śliwińska; Poland	7.23 AR	Raja Jebali; Tunisia	7.22
F41	Raoua Tlili; Tunisia	10.04 CR	Claire Keefer; Australia	8.44 AR	Samar Ben Koelleb; Tunisia	8.23
F44	Frederike Koleiski; Germany	11.53 SB	Yao Juan; China	11.48 SB	Yang Yue; China	11.32 SB
F53	Fatema Nedham; Bahrain	4.73 SB	Iana Lebiedieva; Ukraine	4.72 PB	Svitlana Stetsiuk; Ukraine	4.39
F54	Yang Liwan; China	7.43	Hania Aidi; Tunisia	6.82	Gloria Zarza Guadarrama; Mexico	6.60 AR
F55	Diana Dadzite; Latvia	8.01	Érica Castaño; Colombia	7.77 AR	Rosa María Guerrero; Mexico	7.45 =PB
F57	Nassima Saifi; Algeria	10.59	Angeles Ortiz Hernandez; Mexico	10.51	Safia Djelal; Algeria	10.29
WR world record | AR area record | CR championship record | GR games record | NR national record | OR Olympic record | PB personal best | SB season best | WL world leading (in a given season)

Events listed in pink were contested but no medals were awarded.

== See also ==
- List of IPC world records in athletics
