= Qatar at the 2020 Summer Paralympics =

- IPC code: QAT
- NPC: Qatar Paralympic Committee

in Tokyo
- Competitors: 2 in 1 sports
- Medals: Gold 0 Silver 0 Bronze 1 Total 1

Summer Paralympics appearances (overview)
- 1996; 2000; 2004; 2008; 2012; 2016; 2020; 2024

Qatar competed at the 2020 Summer Paralympics in Tokyo, Japan, from 24 August to 5 September 2021.

== Medalists ==
Medal	Name	Sport	Event	Date
Bronze	Abdulrahman Abdulqadir Fiqi	Athletics	Men's shot put F34	4 September

== Athletics ==
One Qatari male athlete, Abdulrahman Abdulqadir Fiqi (Shot Put F34), successfully to break through the qualifications for the 2020 Paralympics after breaking the qualification limit.
