= Qatar at the 2016 Summer Paralympics =

- IPC code: QAT
- NPC: Qatar Paralympic Committee

in Rio de Janeiro
- Competitors: 3 in 1 sports
- Medals Ranked 67th: Gold 0 Silver 2 Bronze 0 Total 2

Summer Paralympics appearances (overview)
- 1996; 2000; 2004; 2008; 2012; 2016; 2020; 2024

Qatar competed at the 2016 Summer Paralympics in Rio de Janeiro, Brazil, from 7 September to 18 September 2016.

== Disability classifications ==
Every participant at the Paralympics has their disability grouped into one of five disability categories; amputation, the condition may be congenital or sustained through injury or illness; cerebral palsy; wheelchair athletes, there is often overlap between this and other categories; visual impairment, including blindness; Les autres, any physical disability that does not fall strictly under one of the other categories, for example dwarfism or multiple sclerosis. Each Paralympic sport then has its own classifications, dependent upon the specific physical demands of competition. Events are given a code, made of numbers and letters, describing the type of event and classification of the athletes competing. Some sports, such as athletics, divide athletes by both the category and severity of their disabilities, other sports, for example swimming, group competitors from different categories together, the only separation being based on the severity of the disability.

== Medallists ==
Medal	Name	Sport	Event	Date
Silver	Abdulrahman Abdulqadir	Athletics	Men's shot put F34	11 September
Silver	Sara Hamdi Masoud	Athletics	Women's shot put F33	16 September

== Athletics ==
Men's Track

Athlete	Events	Heat		Final	
Athlete	Events	Time	Rank	Time	Rank
Mohammed Al-Kubaisi	100 m T34	16.45	4 Q	16.68	8

Men's Field

Athlete	Events	Result	Rank
Abdulrahman Abdulqadir	Shot put F34	11.15	2nd place, silver medalist(s)
Abdulrahman Abdulqadir	Javelin throw F34	26.03	8

Women's Field

Athlete	Events	Result	Rank
Sara Hamdi Masoud	Shot put F33	5.39	2nd place, silver medalist(s)

== See also ==
- Qatar at the 2016 Summer Olympics
