= Qatar at the 2024 Summer Paralympics =

- IPC code: QAT

in Paris, France August 28, 2024 – September 8, 2024
- Competitors: 2 (1 man and 1 woman) in 1 sport
- Flag bearers: Ali Radi Arshid; Sara Hamdi Masoud
- Medals: Gold 0 Silver 0 Bronze 0 Total 0

Summer Paralympics appearances (overview)
- 1996; 2000; 2004; 2008; 2012; 2016; 2020; 2024

Qatar competed at the 2024 Summer Paralympics in Paris, France, from 28 August to 8 September 2024. This was the nation's eighth time competing at the Summer Paralympic Games after it made its debut at the 1996 Summer Paralympics. The delegation consisted of two competitors from one sport.

== Competitors ==
The following is the list of number of competitors in the Games.

Sport	Men	Women	Total
Athletics	1	1	2
Total	1	1	2

== Athletics ==
Athlete	Event	Heat		Final	
Athlete	Event	Result	Rank	Result	Rank
Sara Hamdi Masoud	Women's shot put F33	—		5.42	6
Ali Radi Arshid	Men's 100 metres T34	15.20	3 Q	15.42	6
Ali Radi Arshid	Men's 800 metres T34	1:40.36	3 Q	1:41.84	7

== See also ==
- Qatar at the 2024 Summer Olympics
- Qatar at the Paralympics
