= Ecuador at the 2008 Summer Paralympics =

- IPC code: ECU
- NPC: Ecuadorian Paralympic Sport Federation

in Beijing
- Competitors: 2 in 1 sport
- Medals: Gold 0 Silver 0 Bronze 0 Total 0

Summer Paralympics appearances (overview)
- 1976; 1980; 1984; 1988; 1992; 1996; 2000; 2004; 2008; 2012; 2016; 2020; 2024

Ecuador sent a delegation to compete at the 2008 Summer Paralympics in Beijing, People's Republic of China. The delegation consisted of two competitors, both powerlifters.

== Powerlifting ==
Athlete	Event	Attempts (kg)				Result (kg)	Rank
Athlete	Event	First	Second	Third	Fourth	Result (kg)	Rank
Jose Marino	Men's 82.5 kg	~~180.0~~	~~185.0~~	~~185.0~~	N/A	NMR	—
Nancy Martinez	Women's 40 kg	75.0	77.5	80.0	N/A	80.0	5

Key: NMR=No marks recorded

== See also ==
- Ecuador at the Paralympics
- Ecuador at the 2008 Summer Olympics
