= Rima Abdelli =

Tunisian Paralympic athlete (born 1988)

Personal information
- Born: 24 February 1988 (age 38) Madanin, Tunisia

Sport
- Country: Tunisia
- Sport: Para-athletics
- Disability: Short stature
- Disability class: F40
- Event: Shot put
Medal record
Women's para-athletics
Representing Tunisia
Paralympic Games
Silver medal – second place	2016 Rio de Janeiro	Shot put F40
World Championships
Gold medal – first place	2017 London	Shot put F40
Bronze medal – third place	2015 Doha	Shot put F40

Rima Abdelli (born 24 February 1988 in Madanin) is a Tunisian Paralympic athlete of short stature and she competes in F40-classification events. She represented Tunisia at the 2016 Summer Paralympics held in Rio de Janeiro, Brazil and she won the silver medal in the women's shot put F40 event. In 2019, she qualified to represent Tunisia at the 2020 Summer Paralympics in Tokyo, Japan.

At the 2015 World Championships held in Doha, Qatar, she won the bronze medal in the women's shot put F40 event. Two years later, at the 2017 World Championships held in London, United Kingdom, she set a new personal best of 7.57m in the same event and she won the gold medal. At the 2019 World Championships held in Dubai, United Arab Emirates, she finished in 4th place in this event with a distance of 7.79m. At the 2020 Summer Paralympics, she placed fifth in the women's shot put F40 event.
