= Qatar at the 2012 Summer Paralympics =

- IPC code: QAT
- NPC: Qatar Paralympic Committee

in London
- Competitors: 1 in 1 sport
- Medals: Gold 0 Silver 0 Bronze 0 Total 0

Summer Paralympics appearances (overview)
- 1996; 2000; 2004; 2008; 2012; 2016; 2020; 2024

Qatar competed at the 2012 Summer Paralympics in London, United Kingdom, from 29 August to 9 September 2012.

The country was represented by a single athlete, Abdulrahman Abdulqader Abdulrahman, in field events: the discus, the javelin and the shot put.

== Athletics ==
Men’s Field Events

Athlete	Event	Distance	Points	Rank
Abdulrahman Abdulrahman	Shot Put F34	10.86	—N/a	9
Abdulrahman Abdulrahman	Discus Throw F32-34	40.15	960	6
Abdulrahman Abdulrahman	Javelin Throw F33-34	34.99	—N/a	7

== See also ==
- Summer Paralympic disability classification
- Qatar at the Paralympics
- Qatar at the 2012 Summer Olympics
