= Qatar at the 2004 Summer Paralympics =

- IPC code: QAT
- NPC: Qatar Paralympic Committee

in Athens
- Competitors: 2 in 2 sports
- Flag bearer: Nasser Al Sahoti
- Medals: Gold 0 Silver 0 Bronze 0 Total 0

Summer Paralympics appearances (overview)
- 1996; 2000; 2004; 2008; 2012; 2016; 2020; 2024

Qatar competed at the 2004 Summer Paralympics in Athens, Greece. The team included two athletes, both of them men, and won no medals.

== Sports ==
=== Athletics ===
Athlete	Class	Event	Final		
Athlete	Class	Event	Result	Points	Rank
Nasser Al Sahoti	F58	Javelin	44.01	-	5

=== Powerlifting ===
Athlete	Event	Result	Rank
Ali Mohamed	+100kg	190.0	7

== See also ==
- Qatar at the Paralympics
- Qatar at the 2004 Summer Olympics
