= Samar Ben Koelleb =

Tunisian Paralympic athlete

Personal information
- National team: Tunisia
- Born: 15 November 1995 (age 30) Tunisia

Sport
- Country: Tunisia
- Sport: Shot put, discus
- Disability class: F41
Medal record
Women's para athletics
Representing Tunisia
Paralympic Games
Silver medal – second place	2016 Rio de Janeiro	Shot put F41
World Championships
Bronze medal – third place	2017 London	Shot put F41
Bronze medal – third place	2017 London	Discus throw F41

Samar Ben Koelleb (born 15 November 1995) is a Tunisian athlete who competes in both shot put and discus for her country. She won the silver medal in the women's F41 shot put at the 2016 Summer Paralympics, and bronze medals in both sports at the 2017 World Para Athletics Championships.

== Career ==
Born on 15 November 1995 in Tunisia, Samar Ben Koelleb went on to compete for her nation in both discuss and shot put. Ben Koelleb competed at the 2016 Summer Paralympics in Rio de Janeiro, Brazil. Taking part in the F41 shot put on the first day of the games, she threw a distance of 8.36 metres (27.4 ft) to win the silver medal behind fellow Tunisian Raoua Tlili with a throw of 10.19 metres (33.4 ft). She also competed in the F41 discus throw competition, but fell outside of the podium positions which were taken up by Irish athlete Niamh McCarthy in silver, and fellow Tunisians Fathia Amaimia in bronze, and Tlili who once again won the gold medal.

At the World Para Athletics Grand Prix, held in 2017 in Tunis, Ben Koelleb once again won the silver medal in the F41 discus competition on day one. She threw 8.59 metres (28.2 ft), only beaten once again by Tlili with 9.7 metres (32 ft). Later that year, she competed at the World Para Athletics Championships in London, at the site of the 2012 Paralympic Games. On this occasion, Ben Koelleb won two medals, a bronze in each of the F41 shot put and discus.
