= Sara Al Senaani =

United Arab Emirati Paralympic athlete

Sport
- Country: United Arab Emirates
- Sport: Para-athletics
- Disability class: F33
- Event: Shot put
Medal record
Women's para-athletics
Representing United Arab Emirates
Paralympic Games
Bronze medal – third place	2016 Rio de Janeiro	Shot put F33
Asian Para Games
Bronze medal – third place	2018 Jakarta	Shot put F33

Sara Al Senaani (Note: Sometimes spelled as Sara Alsenaani or Sara al-Senaani.) is a Paralympic athlete from United Arab Emirates. She was the first female Paralympic athlete to win a medal at the Summer Paralympics for the United Arab Emirates, winning a bronze medal in the women's shot put F33 at the 2016 Summer Paralympics.

== Career ==
She represented the country at the 2016 Summer Paralympics in Rio de Janeiro, Brazil and she won the bronze medal in the women's shot put F33 event.

At the 2019 World Para Athletics Championships held in Dubai, United Arab Emirates, she finished in 9th place in the women's shot put F33 event. She set a new personal best of 5.33m. In 2021, Al Senaani won bronze in women's F33 shot put at the Dubai 2021 World Para Athletics Grand Prix.

== Achievements ==
Year	Competition	Venue	Position	Event	Notes
Representing United Arab Emirates
2016	Summer Paralympics	Rio de Janeiro, Brazil	3rd	Shot put	5.09 m
2018	Asian Para Games	Jakarta, Indonesia	3rd	Shot put	5.28 m

== Personal life ==
Al Senaani has cerebral palsy. She completed diploma in health and safety from the Al Jazirah Institute of Science and Technology.
