= Ecuador at the Paralympics =

- IPC code: ECU
- NPC: Ecuadorian Paralympic Sport Federation
- Medals Ranked 90th: Gold 3 Silver 0 Bronze 4 Total 7

Summer appearances
- 1976; 1980; 1984; 1988; 1992; 1996; 2000; 2004; 2008; 2012; 2016; 2020; 2024

Ecuador made its Paralympic Games début at the 1976 Summer Paralympics in Toronto, with a small delegation of three competitors in track and field and swimming. The country has participated in every subsequent edition of the Summer Paralympics, except 1980 and 1988, but has never entered the Winter Paralympics. Ecuador's delegations have always been small (never more than four competitors).

On 29 August 2021, the country won its first two Paralympic medals at the 2020 Summer Paralympics through Mendez sisters Poleth Isamar Mendes Sanchez and Anaís Méndez Poleth Mendes won Ecuador's first Paralympic gold medal with a new world record of 14.39 in the women's F20 shot put event during the 2020 Summer Paralympics. Her sister Anaís also won bronze medal in the same discipline making it a rare instance of athletes coming from same family who go on to win medals in a same competition. Prior to the 2020 Summer Paralympics, Ecuador had never won a Paralympic medal.

== Medalists ==
Medal	Name	Games	Sport	Event
Gold	Poleth Méndes	(Japan) 2020 Tokyo	Athletics	Women's shot put F20
Bronze	Anais Mendez	(Japan) 2020 Tokyo	Athletics	Women's shot put F20
Bronze	Kiara Rodriguez	(Japan) 2020 Tokyo	Athletics	Women's long jump T47
Gold	Kiara Rodríguez	(France) 2024 Paris	Athletics	Women's 100 metres T47
Gold	Kiara Rodríguez	(France) 2024 Paris	Athletics	Women's long jump T47
Bronze	Poleth Méndes	(France) 2024 Paris	Athletics	Women's shot put F20
Bronze	Estefany López	(France) 2024 Paris	Athletics	Women's discus throw F41

=== Multiple medalists ===
Athlete	Sport	Games	Gold	Silver	Bronze	Total
Kiara Rodríguez	Athletics	2020, 2024	2	0	1	3
Poleth Méndes	Athletics	2020, 2024	1	0	1	2

== See also ==
- Ecuador at the Olympics
