= Claire Keefer =

Australian Paralympic athlete

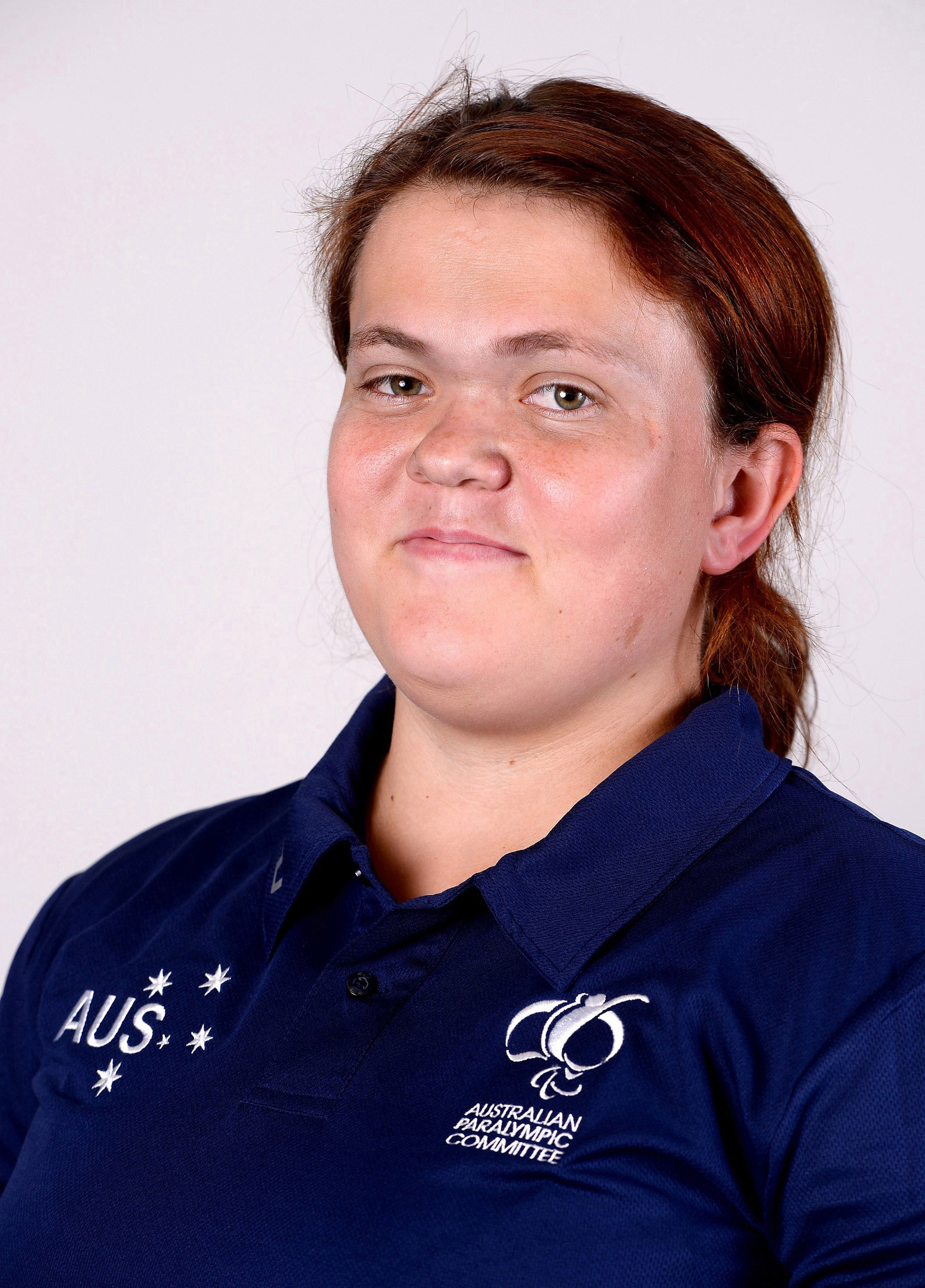
- 2016 Australian Paralympic team portrait

Personal information
- Full name: Claire Keefer
- Nationality: Australian
- Born: 5 May 1995 (age 31)
Medal record
Women's para athletics
Representing Australia
Paralympic Games
| Bronze medal – third place | 2016 Rio | Shot put F41 |
World Championships
| Bronze medal – third place | 2015 Doha | Shot put F41 |
| Silver medal – second place | 2017 London | Shot put F41 |
| Bronze medal – third place | 2019 Dubai | Shot put F41 |

Claire Keefer (born 5 May 1995) is a short stature athlete from Australia. She represented Australia at the 2016 Rio Paralympics in athletics where she won a bronze medal. She has won a silver and bronze medal at the World Para Athletics Championships.

== Personal ==
She was born on 5 May 1995 with achondroplasia and is a person of short stature. Her parents Lindsay and Sue Keefer live in Withcott, Queensland. She attended St Ursula College in Toowoomba. She lives mostly in Withcott, Queensland. She works part-time as a child care worker.

== Career ==
Keefer competes in the F41 classification and started athletics in 2009. She was ineligible to compete at the 2012 London Paralympics due to being under 18. In the F41 classicification the only athletics events for women are the discus throw and shot put. in 2015, Keefer won the silver medal in discus and bronze medal in shot put at an IPC Grand Prix meet in Dubai.

At the 2015 IPC Athletics World Championships in Doha, she won the bronze medal in the Women's Shot Put F41 with a national record throw of 7.62m. She finished fourth in the Women's Discus F41. She has received financial assistance from Aim For the Stars Foundation, the Layne Beachley Foundation. She visits the Queensland Academy of Sport in Brisbane four times per week to undertake technical coaching. Her philosophy is "Strength in size".

She won a bronze medal at the 2016 Rio Paralympics in the Women's Shout Put F41 with a throw of 8.16 m.

At the 2017 World Para Athletics Championships in London, England, she won the silver medal in the Women's Shot Put F41 with a throw of 8.44m. At the 2019 World Para Athletics Championships in Dubai, she threw the shot put 9.19 to win the bronze medal Women's Shot Put F41.

Keefer announced her retirement from competition in April 2021.
