= Ecuador at the 1984 Summer Paralympics =

- IPC code: ECU
- NPC: Ecuadorian Paralympic Sport Federation

in Stoke Mandeville/New York
- Competitors: 2
- Medals: Gold 0 Silver 0 Bronze 0 Total 0

Summer Paralympics appearances (overview)
- 1976; 1980; 1984; 1988; 1992; 1996; 2000; 2004; 2008; 2012; 2016; 2020; 2024

Ecuador competed at the 1984 Summer Paralympics in Stoke Mandeville, Great Britain and New York City, United States. The two competitors from Ecuador did not win any medals and so did not place in the medal table.

== See also ==
- Ecuador at the Paralympics
- Ecuador at the 1984 Summer Olympics
