= Ecuador at the 1992 Summer Paralympics =

- IPC code: ECU
- NPC: Ecuadorian Paralympic Sport Federation

in Barcelona,Madrid
- Competitors: 3
- Medals Ranked 55th: Gold 0 Silver 0 Bronze 1 Total 1

Summer Paralympics appearances (overview)
- 1976; 1980; 1984; 1988; 1992; 1996; 2000; 2004; 2008; 2012; 2016; 2020; 2024

Ecuador competed at the 1992 Summer Paralympics in Barcelona,Madrid Spain. 3 competitors from Ecuador won no medals and so did not place in the medal table.

In Madrid Paralympics games Ecuador has 1 bronze medal in medal table ranked by 21st

== See also ==
- Ecuador at the Paralympics
- Ecuador at the 1992 Summer Olympics
