= Ecuador at the 2004 Summer Paralympics =

- IPC code: ECU
- NPC: Ecuadorian Paralympic Sport Federation

in Athens
- Competitors: 4 in 2 sports
- Flag bearer: Nancy Martinez
- Medals: Gold 0 Silver 0 Bronze 0 Total 0

Summer Paralympics appearances (overview)
- 1976; 1980; 1984; 1988; 1992; 1996; 2000; 2004; 2008; 2012; 2016; 2020; 2024

Ecuador competed at the 2004 Summer Paralympics in Athens, Greece. The team included four athletes, three men and one woman, but won no medals.

== Sports ==
=== Athletics ===
==== Men's track ====
Athlete	Class	Event	Heats		Semifinal		Final	
Athlete	Class	Event	Result	Rank	Result	Rank	Result	Rank
Wilson de la Cruz	T54	100m	16.91	28	did not advance			
Wilson de la Cruz	T54	200m	30.60	29	did not advance			

=== Powerlifting ===
==== Men ====
Athlete	Event	Result	Rank
Jose Marino	75kg	162.5	11
Gerarco Merino	52kg	NMR	

==== Women ====
Athlete	Event	Result	Rank
Nancy Martinez	40kg	75.0	6

== See also ==
- Ecuador at the Paralympics
- Ecuador at the 2004 Summer Olympics
