= Athletics at the 2010 Commonwealth Games – Women's shot put (F32–34/52/53) =

The Para Sport - Women's shot put (F32–34/52/53) at the 2010 Commonwealth Games as part of the athletics programme was held at the Jawaharlal Nehru Stadium on Wednesday 6 October 2010.

== Results ==
Rank	Name	Class	Points	Notes
1st place, gold medalist(s)	Louise Ellery (AUS)	F32	1110 (6.17 m)	PB
2nd place, silver medalist(s)	Jess Hamill (NZL)	F34	979 (7.17 m)	
3rd place, bronze medalist(s)	Gemma Prescott (ENG)	F32	952 (5.54 m)	
4	Brydee Moore (AUS)	F33	951 (5.85 m)	
5	Margareth Chiedum Okoko (NGR)	F52	937 (4.38 m)	
6	Manjualam Mahadevaiah (IND)	F52	651 (3.42 m)	
7	Deepa Malik (IND)	F53	526 (3.63 m)	
8	Agnes Flora Oluoch (KEN)	F52	29 (2.13 m)	
