= Jess Hamill =

New Zealand Paralympic athlete

Personal information
- Full name: Jessica Helen Gillan
- Born: Jessica Helen Hamill; 20 July 1990 (age 35) Invercargill, New Zealand
- Education: Verdon College

Sport
- Country: New Zealand
- Sport: Athletics
- Disability class: F34
- Club: Athletics Taieri

Achievements and titles
- Personal bests: Shot put F34: 7.84 m (2016, NR); Discus F34: 6.61 m (2014, NR); Javelin F34: 14.36 m (2016, NR)
Medal record
Women's para athletics
Representing New Zealand
Paralympic Games
Bronze medal – third place	2016 Rio	Shot put F34
Commonwealth Games
Silver medal – second place	2010 Delhi	Shot put F32–34/52/53
World Championships
Silver medal – second place	2006 Assen	Shot put F34
Silver medal – second place	2015 Doha	Shot put F34
Bronze medal – third place	2017 London	Shot put F34

Jessica Helen Gillan (née Hamill, born 20 July 1990) is a New Zealand paralympic athlete and shotputter. She represented New Zealand at the 2008 Summer Paralympics in Beijing and the 2016 Summer Paralympics in Rio de Janeiro, the latter where she won a bronze medal in the Women's shot put F34.

At the 2010 Commonwealth Games she won a silver medal in the F34 Shot put for elite athletes with a disability.

At the 2015 IPC Athletics World Championships, Hamill won a silver medal in the women's shot put F34, earning her automatic qualification for the 2016 Summer Paralympics in Rio de Janeiro. She was officially confirmed to represent New Zealand at the Paralympics on 23 May 2016.
