= Ecuador at the 2012 Summer Paralympics =

- IPC code: ECU
- NPC: Ecuadorian Paralympic Sport Federation

in London
- Competitors: 2 in 2 sports
- Medals: Gold 0 Silver 0 Bronze 0 Total 0

Summer Paralympics appearances (overview)
- 1976; 1980; 1984; 1988; 1992; 1996; 2000; 2004; 2008; 2012; 2016; 2020; 2024

Ecuador competed at the 2012 Summer Paralympics in London, United Kingdom from August 29 to September 9, 2012.

== Powerlifting ==
Men

Athlete	Event	Result	Rank
Jose Marino	-82.5kg	NMR	

== Swimming ==
Women

Athletes	Event	Heat		Final	
Athletes	Event	Time	Rank	Time	Rank
Jessica Lalama Vega	200m freestyle S14	2:45.06	21	did not advance	

== See also ==
- Ecuador at the 2012 Summer Olympics
