= Louise Ellery =

Australian Paralympic athlete

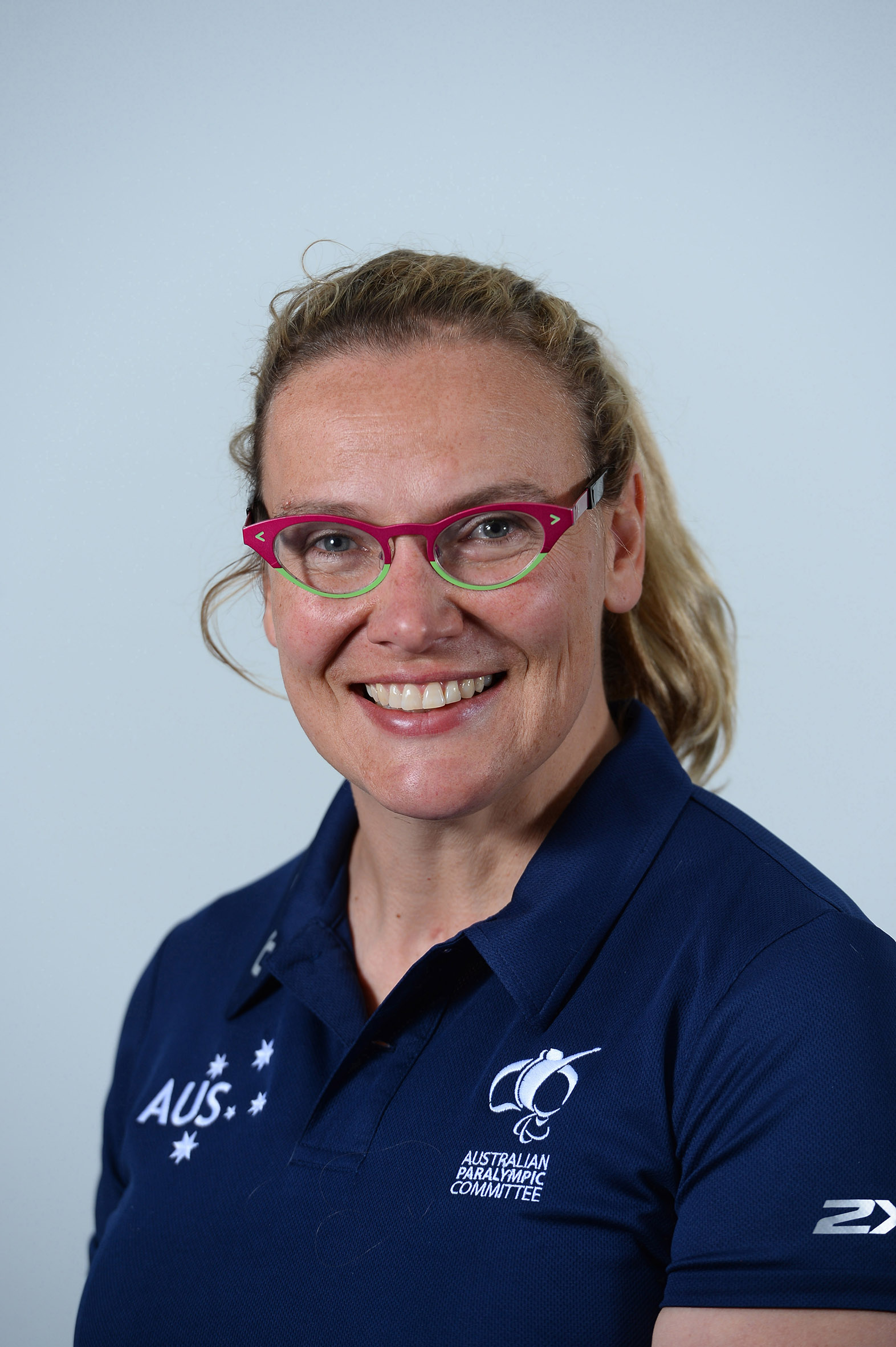
- 2016 Australian Paralympic team portrait of Ellery

Personal information
- Born: 4 January 1977 (age 49) Port Moresby, Papua New Guinea
Medal record
Women's athletics
Representing Australia
Paralympic Games
Silver medal – second place	2012 London	Shot put F32–34
Bronze medal – third place	2016 Rio	Shot put F32
IPC World Championships
Bronze medal – third place	2011 Christchurch	Shot Put F32-34
Bronze medal – third place	2015 Doha	Shot put F32
Commonwealth Games
Gold medal – first place	2010 Delhi	Shot put F32–34/52/53

Louise Ellery (born 4 January 1977) is an Australian Paralympic track and field athlete, Commonwealth Games gold medalist and former world record holder in F32 Shot put for elite athletes with a disability. At the 2016 Rio Paralympics, she won a bronze medal.

== Personal ==
Ellery was born in Port Moresby, Papua New Guinea. She suffered a Traumatic brain injury following a car crash in 1998. She competes in the F32 class (severe to moderate quadriplegia, but with athletes usually able to functionally propel a manual wheelchair). In Sydney in 2005, Ellery broke the world record in seated shot put at the National Championships.

Just 3 days before winning a bronze medal in the 2016 Rio Paralaympics, the now international multi-award-winning short film, 'With Little Hope' was premiered. Ellery executive produced and wrote this film inspired by her personal experiences. It was released in 2017.

== Athletics ==
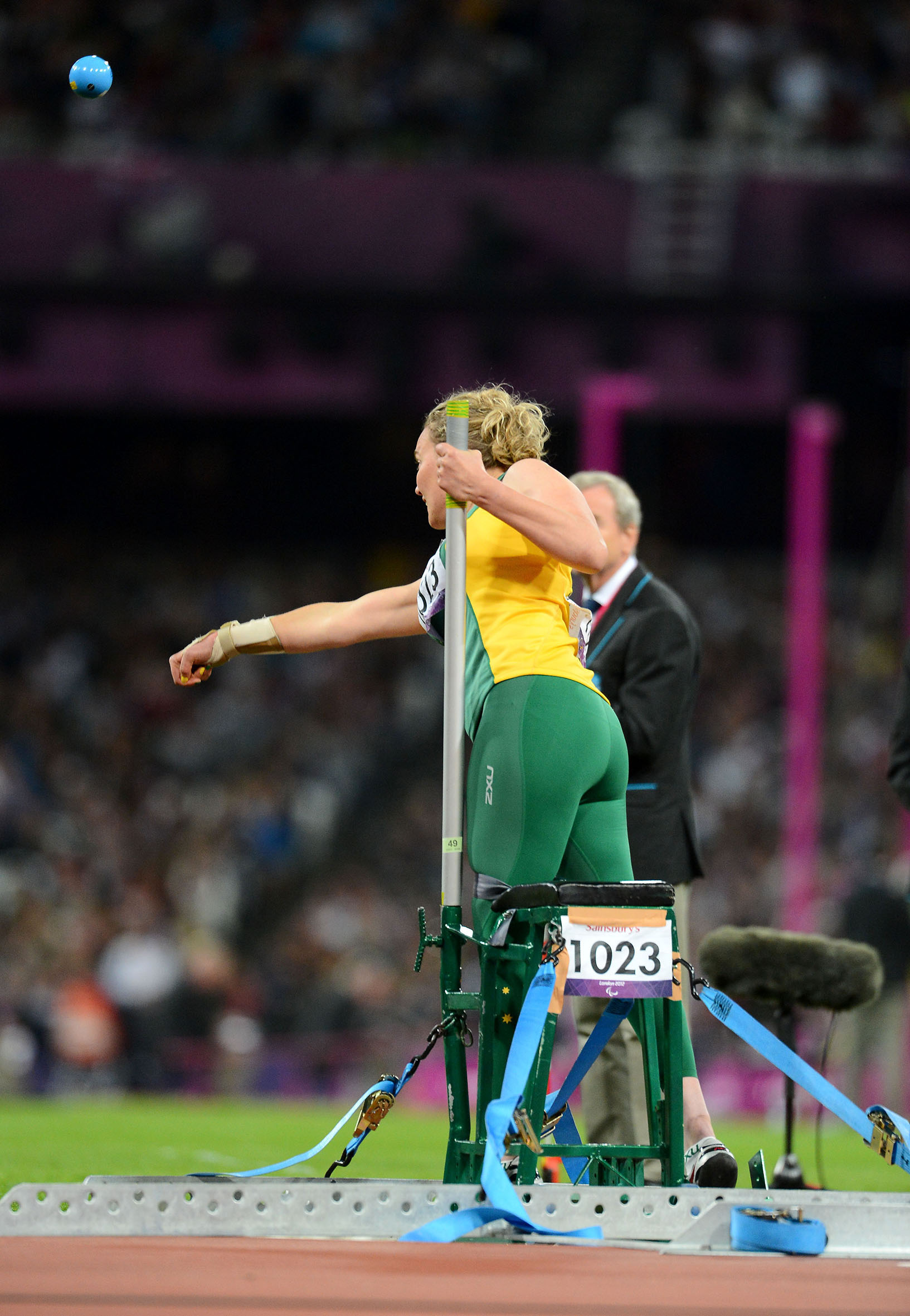
Ellery at the 2012 London Paralympics

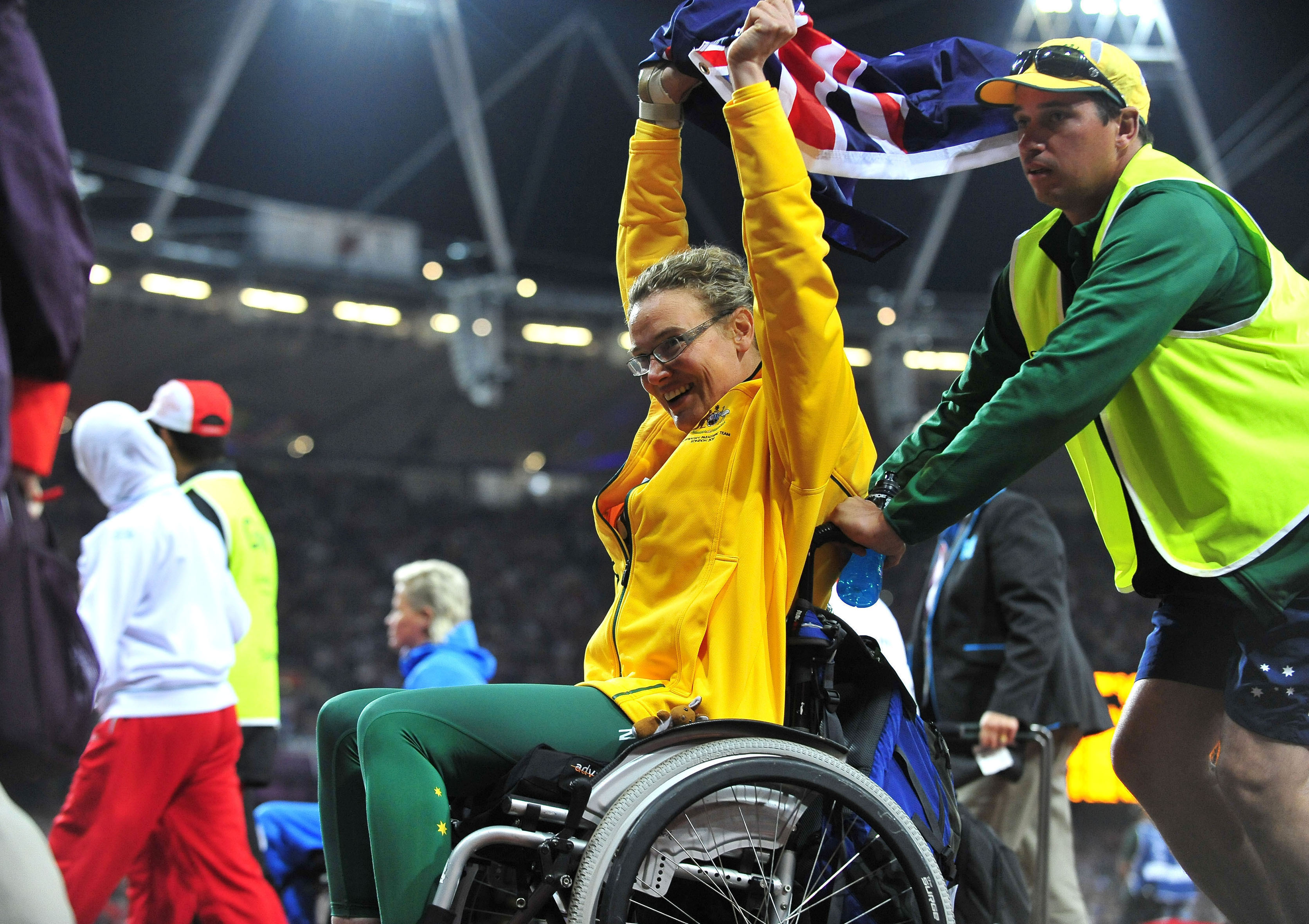
Ellery at the 2012 London Paralympics

=== Paralympic Games ===
At the 2004 Athletics Paralympics, she finished sixth in the Women's Shot Put F32-34/52-53. She finished again in the Women's Shot Put F32-34/52-53 at the 2008 Beijing Paralympics. At the 2012 London Games, she won the silver medal in the Women's Shot Put F32-34 with a throw of 5.90 m. She finished eighth in the Women's Club Throw F31/32/51. At the 2016 Summer Paralympics, Ellery won Bronze in the Women's Shot Put F32 with a throw of 4.19.

=== IPC World Championships ===
At the 2011 IPC Athletics World Championships in Christchurch, she won the bronze medal in the Women's Shot Put F32-34 with a throw of 6.31m and finished fifth in the Women's Club Throw F31/32/51. She did not medal at the 2013 IPC Athletics World Championships in Lyon. At the 2015 IPC Athletics World Championships in Doha, she won the bronze medal in the Women's Shot Put F32 with a throw of 4.53m. At the 2017 World Para Athletics Championships in London, England, she finished eighth in the Women's Shot Put F32 with a throw of 4.31.

=== Commonwealth Games ===
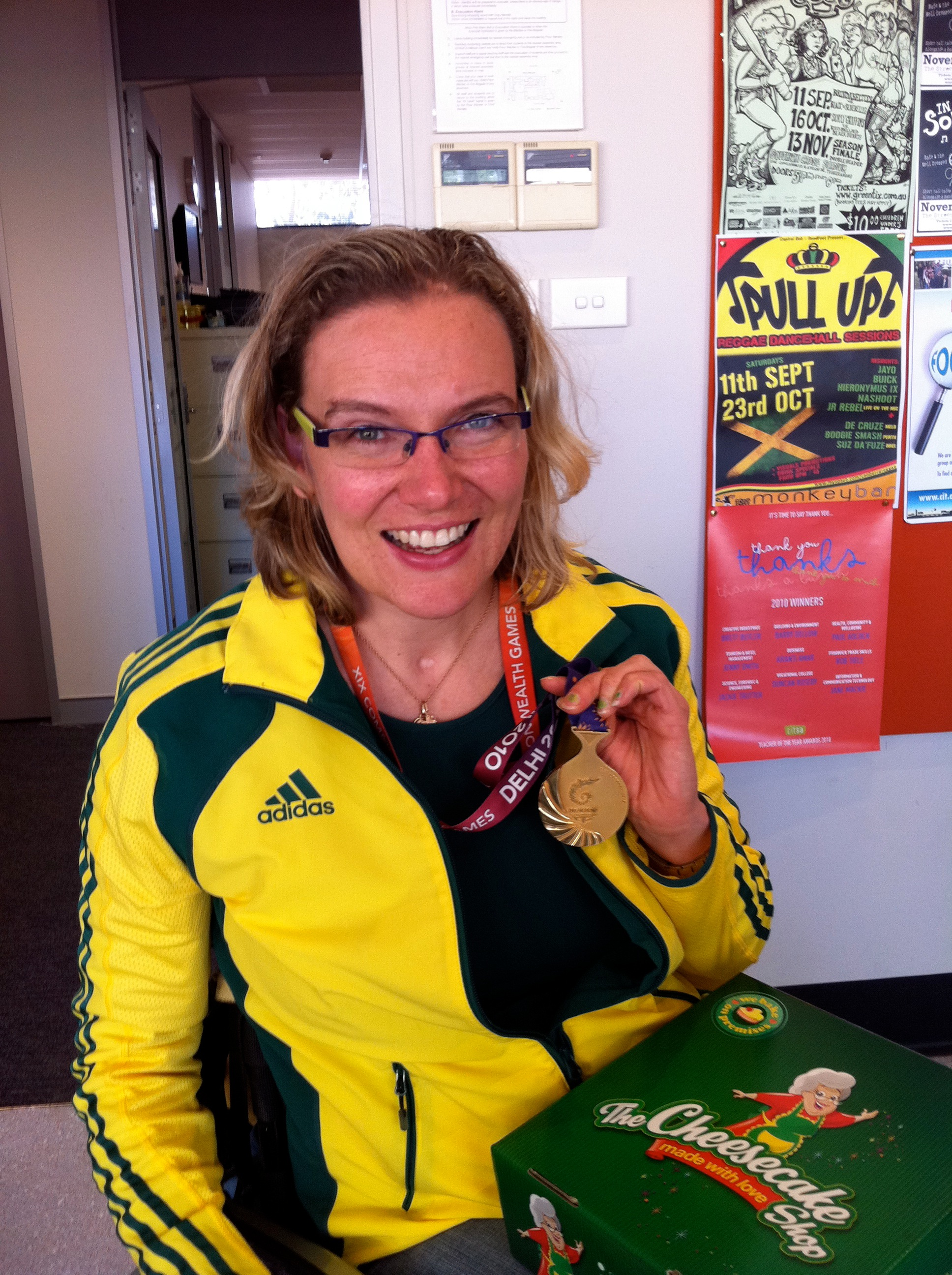
Louise Ellery with her gold medal

Ellery won gold medal in the women's F32–34/52/53 shot put, as a competitor in the F32 class, again breaking the world record with a throw of 6.17 metres. This was Australia's first gold medal in the track and field events at the 2010 Delhi Commonwealth Games which took place at the Jawaharlal Nehru Stadium, Delhi.

In 2015/16, she has an ACT Academy of Sport scholarship.
