= Qatar at the 2008 Summer Paralympics =

- IPC code: QAT
- NPC: Qatar Paralympic Committee

in Beijing
- Competitors: 2 in 2 sports
- Flag bearer: Ali Abdulla Mohamed
- Medals: Gold 0 Silver 0 Bronze 0 Total 0

Summer Paralympics appearances (overview)
- 1996; 2000; 2004; 2008; 2012; 2016; 2020; 2024

Qatar sent a delegation to compete at the 2008 Summer Paralympics in Beijing, People's Republic of China. It did not win any medals.

== Sports ==
=== Athletics ===
Athlete	Class	Event	Final		
Athlete	Class	Event	Result	Points	Rank
Nasser Saed Al-Sahoti	F57-58	Men's javelin throw	41.82	887	10

=== Powerlifting ===
Athlete	Event	Result	Rank
Ali Abdulla Mohamed	+100kg	DNF	

== See also ==
- Qatar at the Paralympics
- Qatar at the 2008 Summer Olympics
