= Anaís Méndez =

Ecuadorian Paralympic athlete

Personal information
- Nationality: Ecuadorian
- Born: 18 January 2000 (age 26)

Sport
- Sport: Paralympic athletics
- Disability class: F20
- Event: shot put
Medal record
Women's athletics
Representing Ecuador
Paralympic Games
Bronze medal – third place	2020 Tokyo	Shot put F20

Anaís Méndez (born 18 January 2000) is an Ecuadorian Paralympic athlete. She along with her elder sister Poleth Isamar Mendes Sanchez claimed the first medals for Ecuador in the history of the Paralympics. Both have the unique distinction of being the only siblings combination to be the first two Paralympic medalists for a country.

== Career ==
She made her first Paralympic appearance representing Ecuador at the 2016 Summer Paralympics.

She clinched bronze medal in the women's F20 shot put event during the 2020 Summer Paralympics. Coincidentally, her sister Poleth Isamar Mendes Sanchez won the gold medal in the same discipline making it a rare instance of athletes coming from same family who go on to win medals in a same competition. Anaís Méndez won Ecuador's first ever bronze medal in Paralympics history while her elder sister Poleth Isamar Mendes Sanchez won Ecuador's first ever gold medal in Paralympics history. Prior to the 2020 Summer Paralympics, Ecuador had never won a Paralympic medal.
