= Sara Hamdi Masoud =

Qatari Paralympic athlete

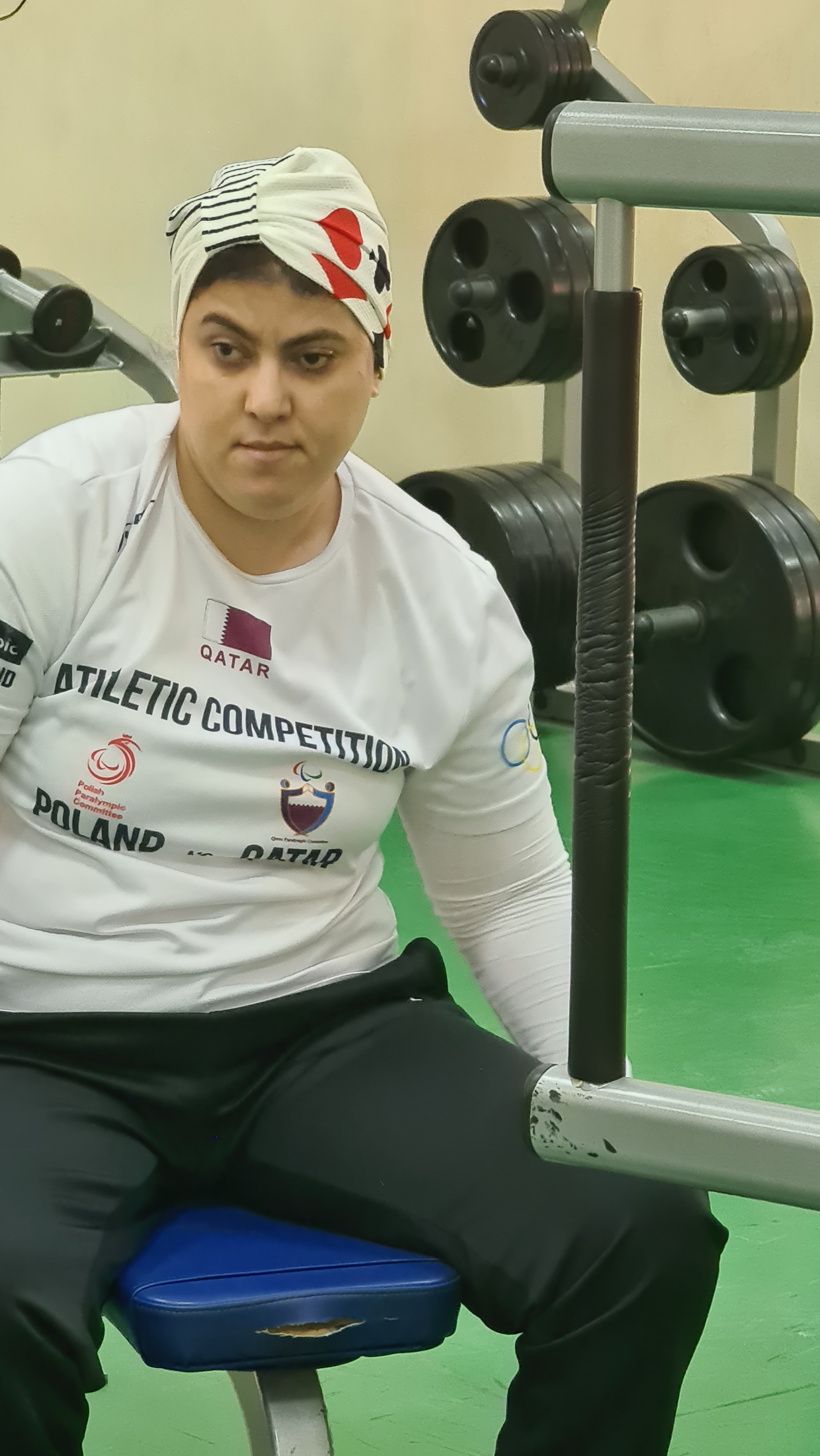
- Masoud in 2021

Sport
- Country: Qatar
- Sport: Para-athletics
- Disability class: F33
- Event: Shot put
Medal record
Women's para-athletics
Representing Qatar
Paralympic Games
Silver medal – second place	2016 Rio de Janeiro	Shot put F33
World Championships
Silver medal – second place	2017 London	Shot put F33
Asian Para Games
Silver medal – second place	2018 Jakarta	Shot put F33

Sara Hamdi Masoud is a Qatari Paralympic athlete. She represented Qatar at the 2016 Summer Paralympics held in Rio de Janeiro, Brazil and she won the silver medal in the women's shot put F33 event. She is the first female Paralympic athlete to win a medal at the Paralympic Games for Qatar.

At the 2017 World Para Athletics Championships held in London, United Kingdom, she won the silver medal in the women's shot put F33 event. She also competed in this event at the 2019 World Para Athletics Championships held in Dubai, United Arab Emirates where she finished in 8th place.

In 2018, she won the silver medal in the women's shot put F33 event at the 2018 Asian Para Games held in Jakarta, Indonesia.

== Achievements ==
Year	Competition	Venue	Position	Event	Notes
Representing Qatar
2016	Summer Paralympics	Rio de Janeiro, Brazil	2nd	Shot put	5.39 m
2017	World Championships	London, United Kingdom	2nd	Shot put	5.39 m
2018	Asian Para Games	Jakarta, Indonesia	2nd	Shot put	5.45 m
