= Poleth Méndes =

Ecuadorian Paralympic athlete

Personal information
- Full name: Poleth Isamar Méndes Sánchez
- Born: 4 February 1996 (age 30) Carpuela, Ecuador

Sport
- Sport: Paralympic athletics
- Disability class: F20
- Event: shot put
Medal record
Women's Para-athletics
Representing Ecuador
Paralympic Games
Gold medal – first place	2020 Tokyo	Shot put F20
Bronze medal – third place	2024 Paris	Shot put F20
World Championships
Silver medal – second place	2017 London	Shot put F20
Silver medal – second place	2024 Kobe	Shot put F20
Parapan American Games
Gold medal – first place	2019 Lima	Shot put F20
Gold medal – first place	2023 Santiago	Shot put F20

Poleth Isamar Méndes Sánchez (Note: In this Spanish name, the first or paternal surname is Méndes and the second or maternal family name is Sánchez.) (born 4 February 1996), also simply known as Poleth Méndes, is an Ecuadorian Paralympic athlete. She along with her younger sister Anaís Méndez claimed the first medals for Ecuador in the history of the Paralympics. Both have the unique distinction of being the only siblings combination to be the first two Paralympic medalists for a country.

Méndes and her sister share different spelling of their surnames due to a clerical error in the civil registry.

== Career ==
She made her first Paralympic appearance representing Ecuador at the 2016 Summer Paralympics. She was also the flag bearer for Ecuador during the 2016 Summer Paralympics Parade of Nations. She also claimed a silver medal in the women's shot put F20 category at the 2017 World Para Athletics Championships.

She clinched gold medal with a new world record of 14.39 in the women's F20 shot put event during the 2020 Summer Paralympics. Coincidentally, her sister won bronze medal in the same discipline making it a rare instance of athletes coming from same family who go on to win medals in a same competition. Poleth Isamar Mendes Sanchez won Ecuador's first ever gold medal in Paralympics history while her younger sister Anaís Méndez won Ecuador's first ever bronze medal in Paralympics history. Prior to the 2020 Summer Paralympics, Ecuador had never won a Paralympic medal.
