= Svitlana Stetsiuk =

Ukrainian athlete

Personal information
- Born: 19 August 1974 (age 51) Dnipropetrovsk, Soviet Union

Sport
- Country: Ukraine
- Sport: Paralympic athletics
- Disability class: T53
Medal record
Paralympic athletics
Representing Ukraine
World Championships
Silver medal – second place	2013 Lyon	Shot put F52/53
Bronze medal – third place	2017 London	Shot put F53
European Championships
Silver medal – second place	2014 Swansea	Shot put F53/54/55
Silver medal – second place	2014 Swansea	Javelin throw F54
Bronze medal – third place	2018 Berlin	Discus throw F53

Svitlana Serhiivna Stetsiuk (born 19 August 1974) is a Ukrainian athlete. Master of Sports of Ukraine of international class. She participated at the 2016 Summer Paralympic Games in the shot put where she finished in sixth position.

Stetsiuk is engaged in athletics at the Dnipropetrovsk Regional Center for Physical Culture and Sports for the Disabled "Invasport". Stetsiuk's coaches are Olga Shostak and Victor Lys.

== Achievements ==
- Silver medalist of the 2013 IPC Athletics World Championships.
- Double silver medalist of the 2014 IPC Athletics European Championships.
- Debutante of the 2016 Summer Paralympics.
- Participant of 2018 World Para Athletics European Championships.
