= Abdulrahman Abdulqadir Fiqi =

Qatari Paralympic athlete

Personal information
- Born: 7 September 1988 (age 37) Doha, Qatar

Sport
- Country: Qatar
- Sport: Para-athletics
- Disability class: F34
- Event: Shot put
Medal record
Paralympic Games
Silver medal – second place	2016 Rio de Janeiro	Shot put F34
Bronze medal – third place	2020 Tokyo	Shot put F34
World Championships
Gold medal – first place	2017 London	Shot put F34

Abdulrahman Abdulqadir Fiqi (born 7 September 1988) is a Qatari Paralympic athlete. He won the silver medal in the men's shot put F34 event at the 2016 Summer Paralympics held in Rio de Janeiro, Brazil. He also won the bronze medal in the men's shot put F34 event at the 2020 Summer Paralympics held in Tokyo, Japan.

In 2017, he won the gold medal in the men's shot put F34 event at the World Para Athletics Championships held in London, United Kingdom.

He was the flag bearer for Qatar during the 2020 Summer Paralympics Parade of Nations as part of the opening ceremony of the 2020 Summer Paralympics.
