= Ecuador at the 2016 Summer Paralympics =

- IPC code: ECU
- NPC: Ecuadorian Paralympic Sport Federation

in Rio de Janeiro
- Competitors: 5 in 1 sports
- Medals: Gold 0 Silver 0 Bronze 0 Total 0

Summer Paralympics appearances (overview)
- 1976; 1980; 1984; 1988; 1992; 1996; 2000; 2004; 2008; 2012; 2016; 2020; 2024

Ecuador competed at the 2016 Summer Paralympics in Rio de Janeiro, Brazil, from 7 September to 18 September 2016. The team consisted of five athletes, four men, one woman, and one male sighted guide.

== Athletics ==
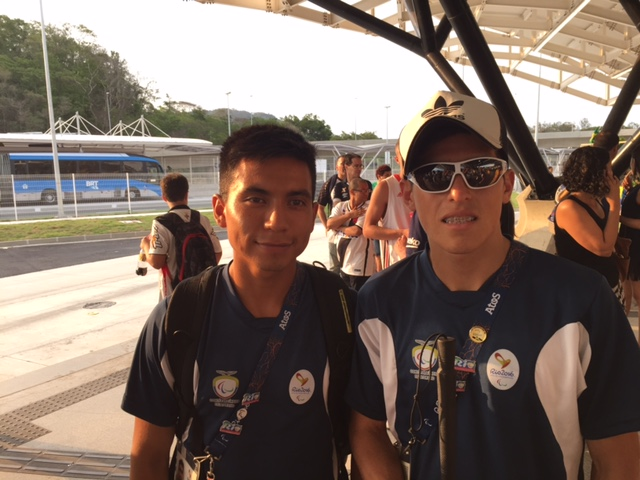
Darwin Castro and guide Sebastian Rosero

Men's Track

Athlete	Events	Heat		Final	
Athlete	Events	Time	Rank	Time	Rank
Damian Carcelen	400 m T20	51.68	4 Q	51.80	8
Ronny Santos Iza	400 m T20	54.41	5	did not advance	
Darwin Castro (Guide – Sebastian Rosero)	1500 m T11	4:21.29	3	did not advance	
Darwin Castro (Guide – Sebastian Rosero)	5000 m T11	—N/a		16:25.38	7

Men's Field

Athlete	Events	Result	Rank
Damian Carcelen	Long Jump F20	5.87	12
Ronny Santos Iza	Long Jump F20	6.74	7
Stalin Mosquera	Shot Put F20	14.79	6

Women's Field

Athlete	Events	Result	Rank
Poleth Mendes Sanchez	Shot Put F20	12.02	5

== See also ==
- Ecuador at the 2016 Summer Olympics
